= Little Lost Lamb =

2018 Picture book

- First edition
- Author: Margaret Wise Brown writing as Golden MacDonald
- Illustrator: Leonard Weisgard
- Publisher: Doubleday
- Publication date: 1945
- Pages: unpaged
- Awards: Caldecott Honor

Little Lost Lamb is a 1945 picture book by Margaret Wise Brown writing as Golden MacDonald and illustrated by Leonard Weisgard. The story is about a shepard who goes searching for a missing lamb. The book was a recipient of a 1946 Caldecott Honor for its illustrations.
