= Rain Drop Splash =

1946 Picture book

- First edition
- Author: Alvin Tresselt
- Illustrator: Leonard Weisgard
- Publisher: Lothrop Company
- Publication date: 1946
- Pages: unpaged
- Awards: Caldecott Honor

Rain Drop Splash is a 1946 picture book by Alvin Tresselt and illustrated by Leonard Weisgard.

The story follows a raindrop that becomes part of ever-larger bodies of water. The book was a recipient of a 1947 Caldecott Honor for its illustrations and Weisgard became the first illustrator to receive the Caldecott Medal and Honor in the same year.
