= The House That Jack Built =

The House That Jack Built may refer to:

- "This Is the House That Jack Built", English nursery rhyme

== Books ==
- The House That Jack Built: La Maison Que Jacques A Batie, a 1958 picture book by Antonio Frasconi
- The House That Jack built, a 1878 picture book by Randolph Caldecott
- The House That Jack Built, a 1999 picture book by Gavin Bishop
- The House That Jack Built, a 2001 book by Linda Evans

== Drama, television, and film ==
- The House That Jack Built, original title of the 1920 musical Mary by Frank Mandel, Otto Harbach and Louis Hirsch
- The House That Jack Built (1900 film), a short British trick film by George Albert Smith
- The House That Jack Built (1967 film), a Canadian animated short film
- The House That Jack Built (2013 film), an American film directed by Henry Barrial
- The House That Jack Built (2018 film), a Danish-French-German-Swedish film directed by Lars von Trier
- The House That Jack Built (1951 play), an Australian play by George Farwell
- The House That Jack Built (1869 play), an Australian play by William Mower Akhurst
- The House That Jack Built, a Canadian play c. 1988 by Margaret Hollingsworth

== Music ==
- The House That Jack Built (album), by American singer Jesca Hoop
- "The House That Jack Built" (Aretha Franklin song), written by Bobby Lance and Fran Robbins and performed by Aretha Franklin
- "The House That Jack Built" (Alan Price song), a 1967 song by Alan Price
- "The House That Jack Built", a 1983 song by Tracie Young
- "The House Jack Built", a song by Metallica from the 1996 album Load

== Other ==
- "The House That Jack Built", a 1966 episode of The Avengers
