= The Little Island (book) =

1946 picture book by Margaret Wise Brown

- First edition
- Author: Margaret Wise Brown, Golden MacDonald, pseud.
- Illustrator: Leonard Weisgard
- Genre: Children's picture book
- Publisher: Doubleday
- Publication date: 1946
- Publication place: United States

The Little Island is a book written by Margaret Wise Brown under the pseudonym Golden MacDonald and illustrated by Leonard Weisgard. Released by Doubleday in 1946, it was the recipient of the Caldecott Medal for illustration in 1947. It describes the four seasons as experienced by a little island. The book is lyrically written, an example being: "Winter came/ and the snow fell softly/ like a great quiet secret in the night/ cold and still."

== Plot ==
A little island in the ocean changes as the seasons comes and go—spring and summer bring flowers, seals, and birds, and days and nights. One day, a kitten visits the island with a family on a picnic. This kitten opines that the island is small and isolated; however, the island retorts that it, like the kitten, is also a part of the world. When the kitten disputes the island's claim, the island suggests that it ask any fish. The kitten catches a fish and demands, on pain of being eaten, to know how the island is part of the bigger land. The fish invites the kitten down into the water to see, which the kitten of course cannot do. The kitten demands to be shown another way. 'Then you will have to take it on faith', says the fish -- 'to believe what I tell you about what you don't know." The fish then tells him "how all lands are one land under the sea." The cat realizes he has learned a great secret, which he loves, and lets the fish go before leaving the island. The island settles back into the timeless cycle of the seasons—autumn, winter, storms, and calm.

== Critical response ==
Golden MacDonald was a pen name for Margaret Wise Brown of Goodnight Moon fame. The text of the book captures Brown's appreciation for the subtle rhythms of nature, and the connections that all beings and objects in nature have with one another.

The book covers the four seasons as they affect the little island, plants, and animals that visit. To show the ongoing nature of the process, the book's timeline expands beyond a single year. The island is described as being: "A part of the world and a world of its own all surrounded by the bright blue sea."

The book won a Caldecott Medal for its illustrations.

Awards
Preceded by The Rooster Crows	Caldecott Medal recipient 1947	Succeeded by White Snow, Bright Snow
