= Sing in Praise =

1946 Picture book

- First edition
- Editor: Opal Wheeler
- Illustrator: Marjorie Torrey
- Publisher: Dutton
- Publication date: 1946
- Pages: unpaged
- Awards: Caldecott Honor

Sing in Praise: A Collection of the Best Loved Hymns is a 1946 picture book edited by Opal Wheeler and illustrated by Marjorie Torrey. A selection of Christian hymns and brief profiles of their creators, the book was a recipient of a 1947 Caldecott Honor for its illustrations.
