= When Will the World Be Mine? =

1954 Caldecott picture book

- Author: Miriam Schlein
- Illustrator: Jean Charlot
- Publisher: W.R. Scott
- Publication date: 1953
- Pages: unpaged
- Awards: Caldecott Honor

When Will the World Be Mine? is a 1953 picture book written by Miriam Schlein and illustrated by Jean Charlot. The book tells the story of a curious rabbit. The book was a recipient of a 1954 Caldecott Honor for its illustrations.
