= The Rooster Crows =

1945 picture book

- First edition
- Author: Maud and Miska Petersham
- Illustrator: Maud and Miska Petersham
- Cover artist: Urpatz
- Genre: Children's book
- Publisher: Macmillan (1945-1994); Simon & Schuster (1994-present)
- Publication date: 1945
- Publication place: United States
- Media type: Hardcover
- Pages: 64

The Rooster Crows: A Book of American Rhymes and Jingles, written and illustrated by Maud and Miska Petersham, is a 1945 picture book published by The Macmillan Company. The Rooster Crows was a Caldecott Medal winner for illustration in 1946. This book is a collection of traditional American nursery rhymes, finger games, skipping rhymes, jingles, and counting-out rhymes. They come from collections all over America.

== Description ==
The book is 64 pages, with rhymes and jingles as well illustrations on each page. The illustrations in the book are done in pencil with color. The colors in the book stay within grey, white, green, orange, and red.

== Plot summary ==
“Little Miss Muffet” and “Star Light, Star Bright,” come back to the memory as easily as “Roses are red, Violets are blue.” There are finger games that give illustrations of how to play as one goes:

These are mothers knives and forks
And this is mother's table.
This is mother's looking glass
And this is baby cradle.

The rhyme is accompanied by illustrations that demonstrate the hand movements associated with it, including placing the hands together in a knife-like shape and ending with a cradle gesture. The illustrations depict clothing and setting associated with an earlier period, such children wearing overalls and bonnets. The illustrations are done in pencil and contain detailed facial expressions

== Critical reception ==
A 1967 review in The Horn Book Magazine states the Petershams have made delightful pictures, in soft harmonious colors, with plenty of humor for these and many other rhymes that American children chant freely. According to Jill May Petershams writing is simple and smooth; it is not descriptive and is not detailed in plot. The themes reflect Petersham's optimism; the plots contain an exciting drama and are resolved through positive actions. Stated by Pilgrim J. the P.s wrote patriotic books known collectively as This Is America series. An American ABC (1941) and The Rooster Crows: A Book of American Rhymes and Jingles (1945) were included in this series.

Awards
Preceded by Prayer for a Child	Caldecott Medal recipient 1946	Succeeded by The Little Island
