= Sing Mother Goose =

1945 Picture book

- First edition
- Author: Opal Wheeler
- Illustrator: Marjorie Torrey
- Publisher: Dutton
- Publication date: 1945
- Pages: unpaged
- Awards: Caldecott Honor

Sing Mother Goose is a 1945 picture book with music by Opal Wheeler and illustrated by Marjorie Torrey. The book contains a collection of Mother Goose Nursery rhymes set to music. The book was a recipient of a 1946 Caldecott Honor for its illustrations.
