= Caldecott Medal =

Annual U.S. children's book illustrator award

- Awarded for: "the most distinguished American picture book for children"
- Country: United States
- Presented by: Association for Library Service to Children, a division of the American Library Association
- First award: 1938; 88 years ago
- Website: ala.org/alsc/caldecott

The Randolph Caldecott Medal, frequently shortened to just the Caldecott, annually recognizes the preceding year's "most distinguished American picture book for children". It is awarded to the illustrator by the Association for Library Service to Children (ALSC), a division of the American Library Association (ALA). The Caldecott and Newbery Medals are considered the most prestigious American children's book awards. Besides the Caldecott Medal, the committee awards a variable number of citations to runners-up they deem worthy, called the Caldecott Honor or Caldecott Honor Books.

The Caldecott Medal was first proposed by Frederic G. Melcher in 1937. The award was named after English illustrator Randolph Caldecott. Unchanged since its founding, the medal, which is given to every winner, features two of Caldecott's illustrations. The awarding process has changed several times over the years, including the use of the term "Honor" for the runner-ups beginning in 1971. There have been between one and five honor books named each year.

To be eligible for a Caldecott, the book must be published in English, in the United States first, and be drawn by an American illustrator. An award committee decides on a winner in January or February, voting using a multi-round point system. The committee judges books on several criteria to meet the Caldecott's goal of recognizing "distinguished illustrations in a picture book and for excellence of pictorial presentation for children."

Winning the award can lead to a substantial rise in books sold. It can also increase the prominence of illustrators. Illustrator and author Marcia Brown is the most recognized Caldecott illustrator, having won three medals and having six honor books. In recent years, there has been an increase in the number of minority characters and illustrators recognized. However, this is something which has fluctuated over the history of the award.

== History ==
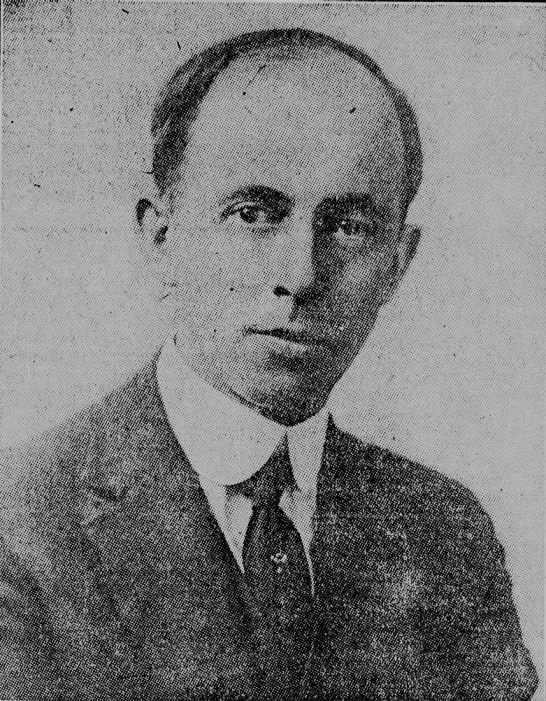
Frederic G. Melcher first proposed the idea for the Caldecott Award following the success of the Newbery Award.

The Caldecott was suggested in 1937 by Frederic G. Melcher, former editor of Publishers Weekly, following the establishment of the Newbery Medal in 1921. The American Library Association adopted Melcher's suggestion of awarding a medal to the illustrator "who had created the most distinguished picture book of the year." According to children's literature expert Leonard S. Marcus, the award helped draw American artists into the field of children's books.

The award has been tweaked over the years, with the most recent changes in 2009. When the award was founded, books could be considered either for the Newbery or the Caldecott, with the same committee judging both awards. The committee noted other books of merit, which were frequently referred to as runner-ups. In 1971, these books were formally named Caldecott Honor books, with this name applied retroactively. In 1977, books became eligible for both awards and, beginning with the 1980 award, separate committees for each award were formed. Until 1958, a previous winner could win again only by unanimous vote of the committee, and it was only in 1963 when joint winners were first permitted.

=== Medal ===
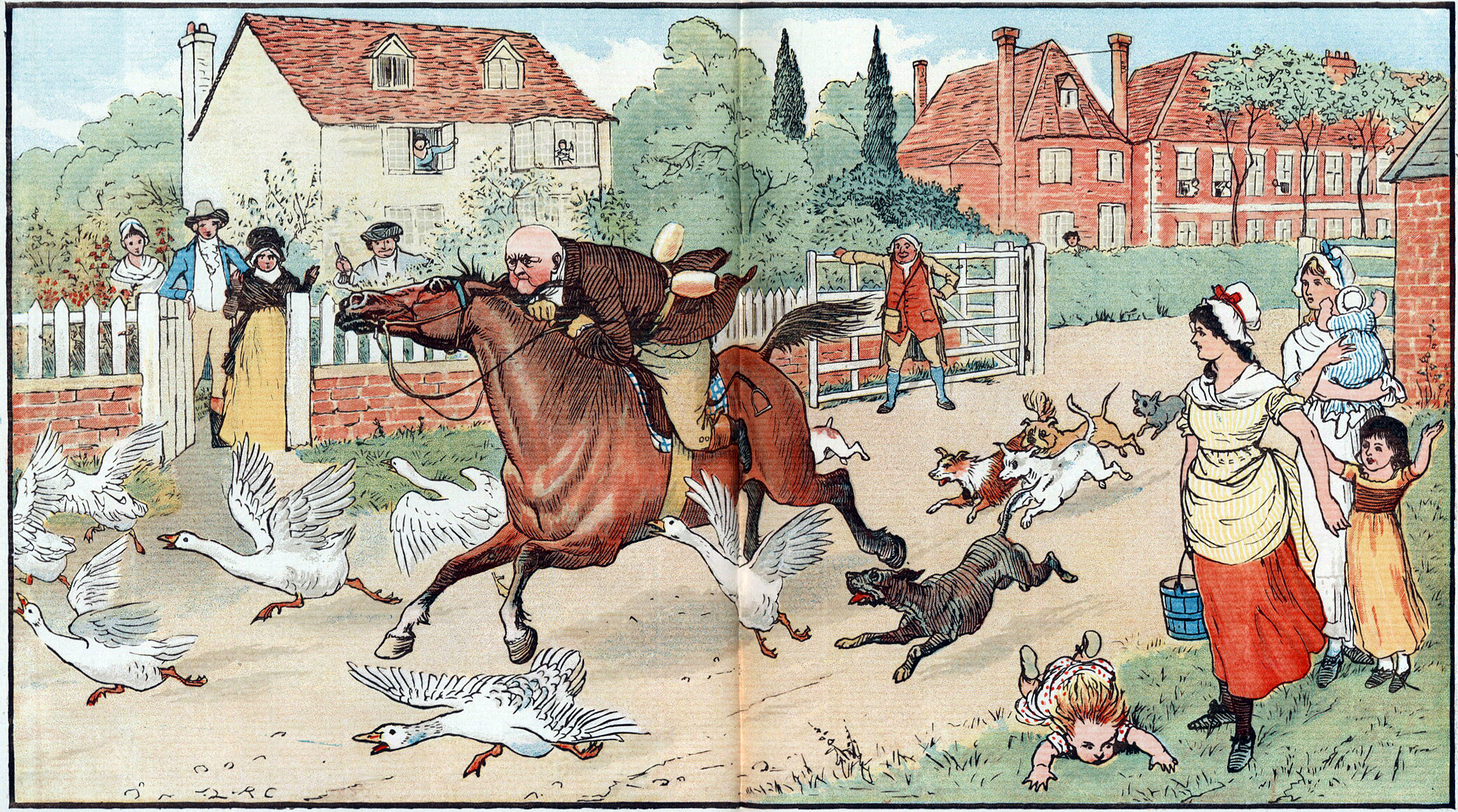
Illustration by Randolph Caldecott (1878) of The Diverting History of John Gilpin, basis of the medal's obverse

The award is named for Randolph Caldecott, a nineteenth-century English illustrator. Rene Paul Chambellan designed the Medal in 1937. The obverse scene is derived from Randolph Caldecott's front cover illustration for The Diverting History of John Gilpin (Routledge, 1878, an edition of the 1782 poem by William Cowper), which depicts John Gilpin astride a runaway horse. The reverse is based on "Four and twenty blackbirds baked in a pie", one of Caldecott's illustrations for the nursery rhyme "Sing a Song of Sixpence".

Each illustrator receives a bronze copy of the medal, which, despite being awarded by the Association for Library Service to Children (ALSC), lists Children's Librarian's Section, the original awarding group, for historical reasons.

== Eligibility and criteria ==
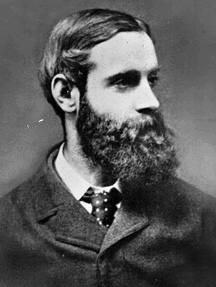
Randolph Caldecott, for whom the medal is named, was an English artist and illustrator. Maurice Sendak said, "Caldecott's work heralds the beginning of the modern picture book."

A picture book, according to the award criteria, provides "a visual experience. A picture book has a collective unity of storyline, theme, or concept, developed through the series of pictures" that constitute the book. The Medal is "for distinguished illustrations in a picture book and for excellence of pictorial presentation for children". Specifically, the illustrations are judged on their artistic technique, interpretation of the book's story and theme, the fit between the illustrations and the story and themes, the precision of depiction of elements of the book, like characters and mood, and how well the illustrations serve their targeted audience. Honor books need to fulfill the same criteria. The book must be self-contained, independent of other media for its enjoyment. Components other than illustration, including the book's text or overall design, may be considered as they affect the overall effectiveness of the book's illustrations.

To be eligible for the Caldecott, the artist must be a US citizen or resident, the book must have been published in English, in the United States first, or simultaneously in other countries. Picture books for any audience up to the age of 14 may be considered. In December 2019, children's literature expert Leonard S. Marcus suggested that the Caldecott had achieved its mission in the US and the award should be expanded so children's book illustrations from anywhere in the world be considered.

== Selection process ==
The committee that decides on the Caldecott Award winner comprises fifteen members of ALSC. Seven members are elected by the entire ALSC membership and eight, including the chairperson, are appointed by the ALSC President. Members are chosen based on their experience. Consideration is also done to ensure a diversity of libraries (e.g. public and school, small and large), and geographical areas are represented as well. Publishers send copies of books to the committee; in 2009, each member received more than 700. However, a book does not need to be sent to the committee to be considered. Instead, to help identify possible contenders, committee members formally nominate seven books in three rounds over the year, and less formally recommend others.

At ALSC's annual midwinter meeting, held in late January or early February, the committee will discuss the nominations and hold a vote on the winner. When voting, committee members list their first place, second place, and third place selections. Each vote is assigned a point value, with first place votes receiving four points, second place three points, and third place two points. The winner must receive at least eight first place votes and be at least eight points ahead of the second-place finisher. After a winner is selected, the committee can decide whether to award any honor books. They may be chosen from runner-ups to the winner, or be selected in a separate ballot. The winner and honor books are kept secret until they are publicly announced, with the committee calling the winning illustrators the morning of the announcement.

In 2015, K. T. Horning of the University of Wisconsin–Madison's Cooperative Children's Book Center proposed to ALSC that old discussions of the Newbery and Caldecott be made public in the service of researchers and historians. This proposal was met with both support and criticism by former committee members and recognized authors. As of 2020, no change has been made.

== Impact and analysis ==
The Caldecott and Newbery awards have historically been considered the most important children's book awards. Anita Silvey, children's book author, editor, and critic, suggests they might even be the most important book awards, saying that "no other award has the economic significance of the Newbery and Caldecott". According to Silvey, a Caldecott winner can have sales increased from 2,000 to 100,000–200,000. Silvey also credits the Caldecott for helping to establish Bradbury Press and Roaring Brook Press as important publishers. It can also be an important recognition for authors. According to Leonard Marcus, Where the Wild Things Are's recognition brought its author and illustrator, Maurice Sendak, to national prominence.

A 1999 study on the reading levels of Caldecott recipients suggested that most winners were written at the elementary age level, with the average reading level having decreased over time. A 2007 study of Caldecott recipients found that the prevalence and importance of female characters had risen and fallen several times over the history of the Caldecott. It also found that, unlike recipients of the Pura Belpré Award and Coretta Scott King Award, the behaviors of male and female characters remained distinct and adhered to traditional gender norms. A different 2007 study, by one of the same authors, also found an increase in the number of minority characters following a 1965 critique by Nancy Larrick, however the number of minorities had fallen by the 2000s. In recent years, there has been an increase in the number of minority characters and illustrators recognized. The Horn Book Magazine editor Martha Parravano has noted how rarely non-fiction books, especially non-fiction books about science, are recognized by the Caldecott.

== Recipients ==
In 1938, Dorothy P. Lathrop’s illustrations for Animals of the Bible won her the inaugural Caldecott Medal, awarded for the year’s “most distinguished American picture book for children.”

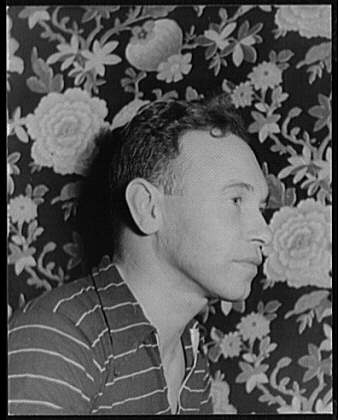
Thomas Handford won the second Caldecott for his book Mei Li, which was based on a girl he met in his travels.

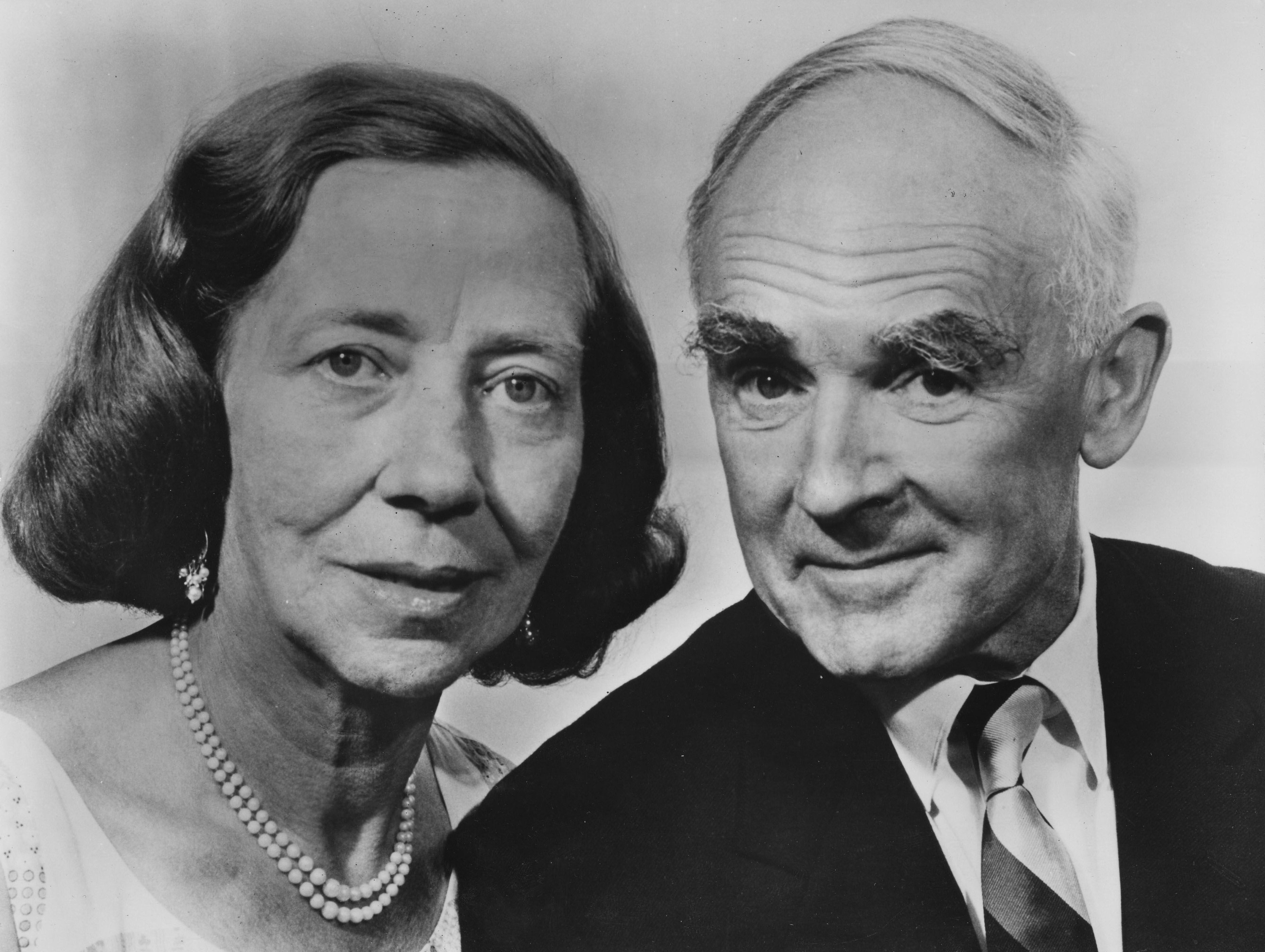
Ingri and Edgar Parin d'Aulaire, who won the third Caldecott Medal in 1940, worked together as a writing and illustrative team.

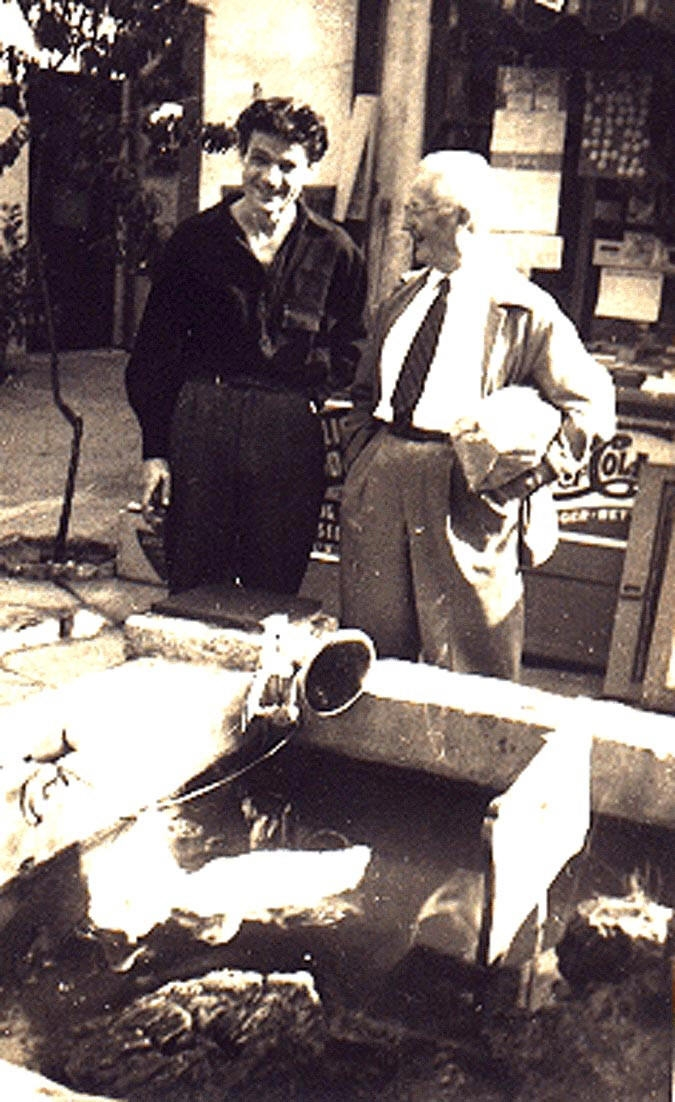
Leo Politi (left), who won the Caldecott Medal and two honors, was called the Italian Dr. Seuss.

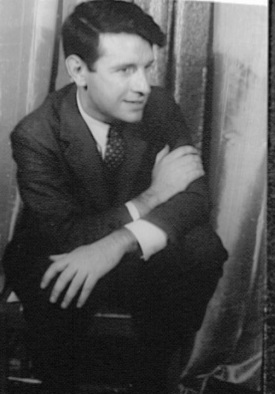
1965 recipient Beni Montresor wrote operas and children's books the same, "I must astonish and amaze myself first, and if I do, then the spectator will react in the same way."

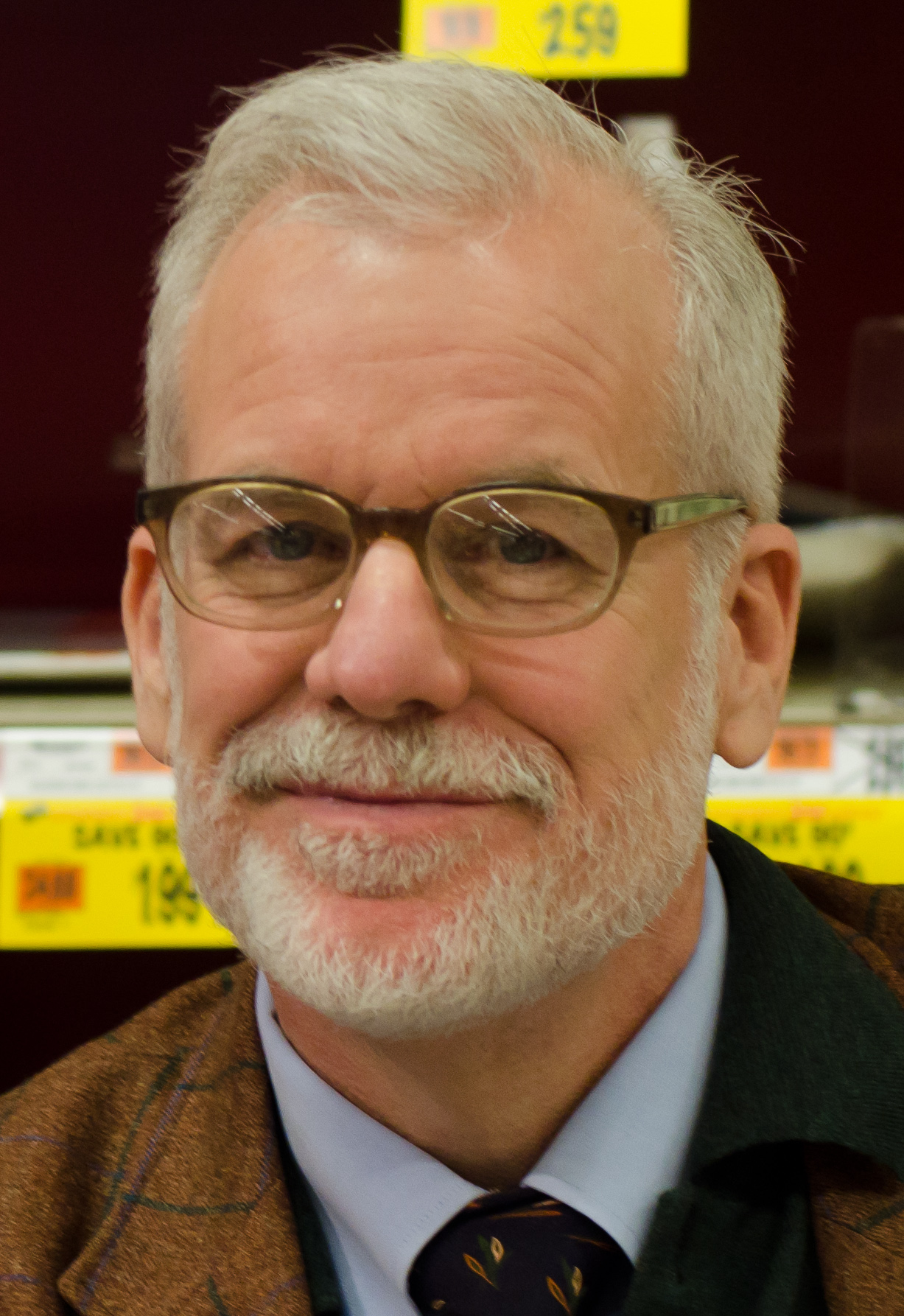
Both of Chris Van Allsburg's Caldecott winners have been adapted into films.

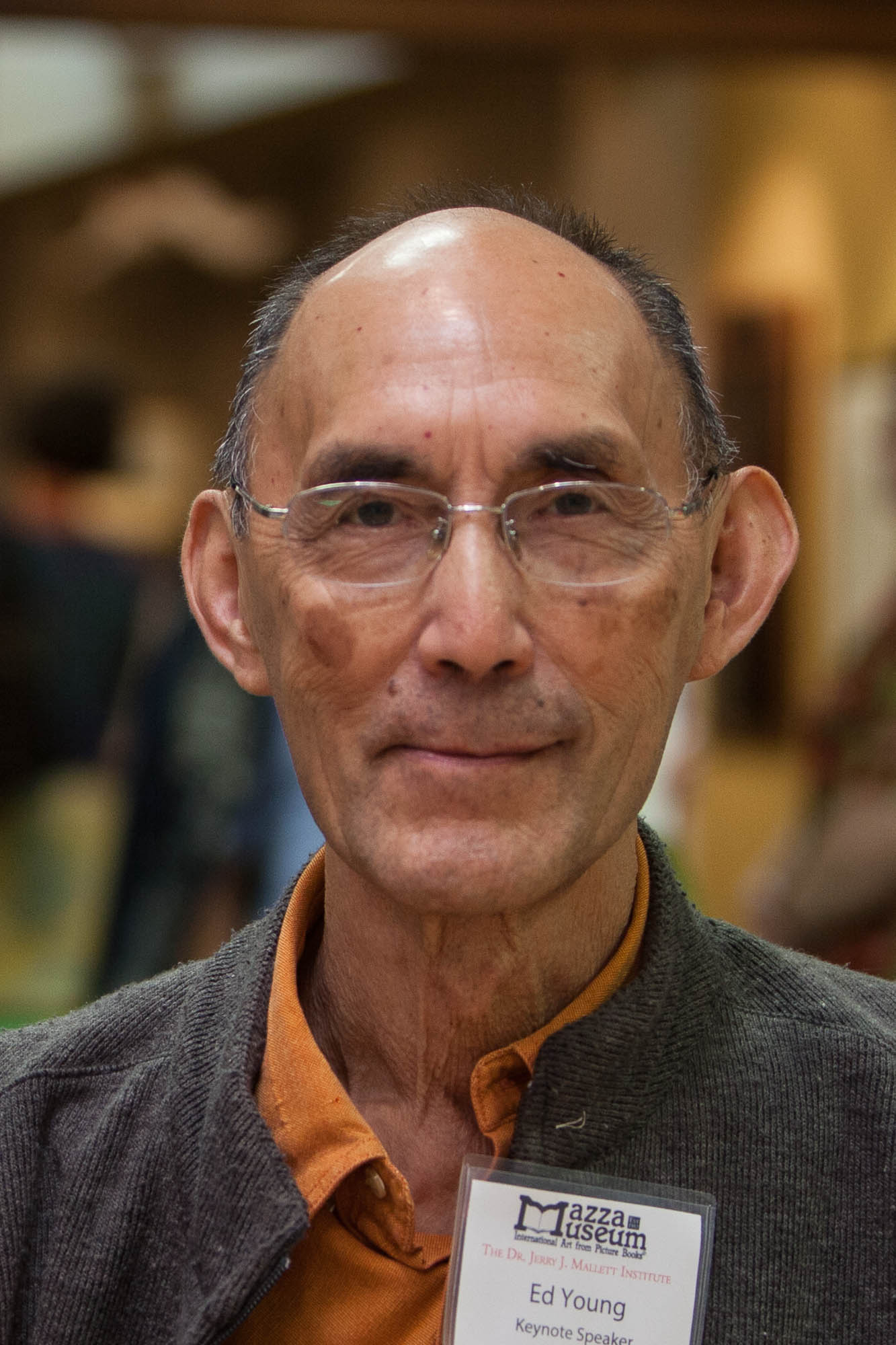
Ed Young won the 1990 Caldecott Medal for his telling of the Chinese version of Little Red Riding Hood.

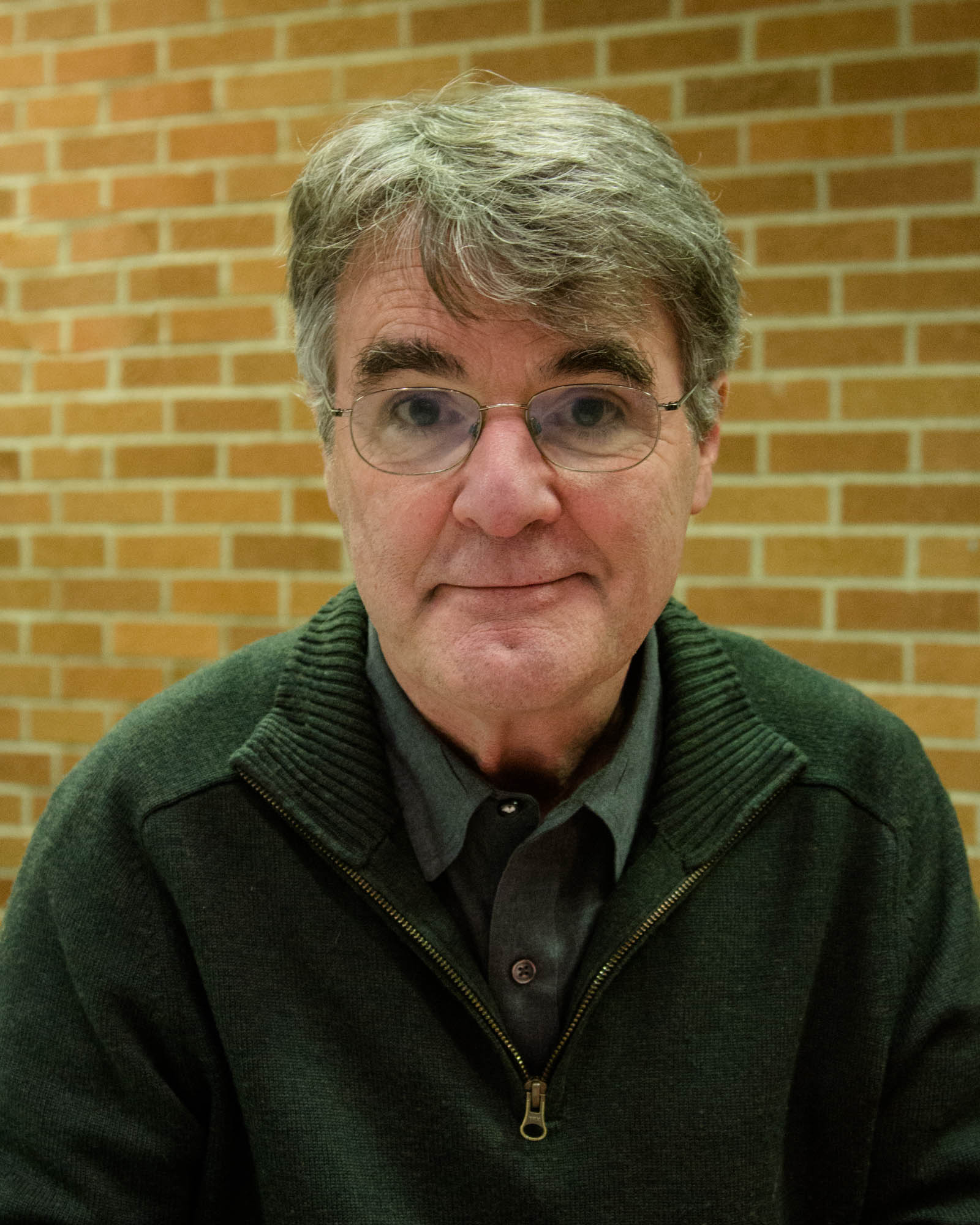
Prior to winning the Medal in 1991, David Macaulay had been disappointed not to have been recognized with the Caldecott for his earlier works.

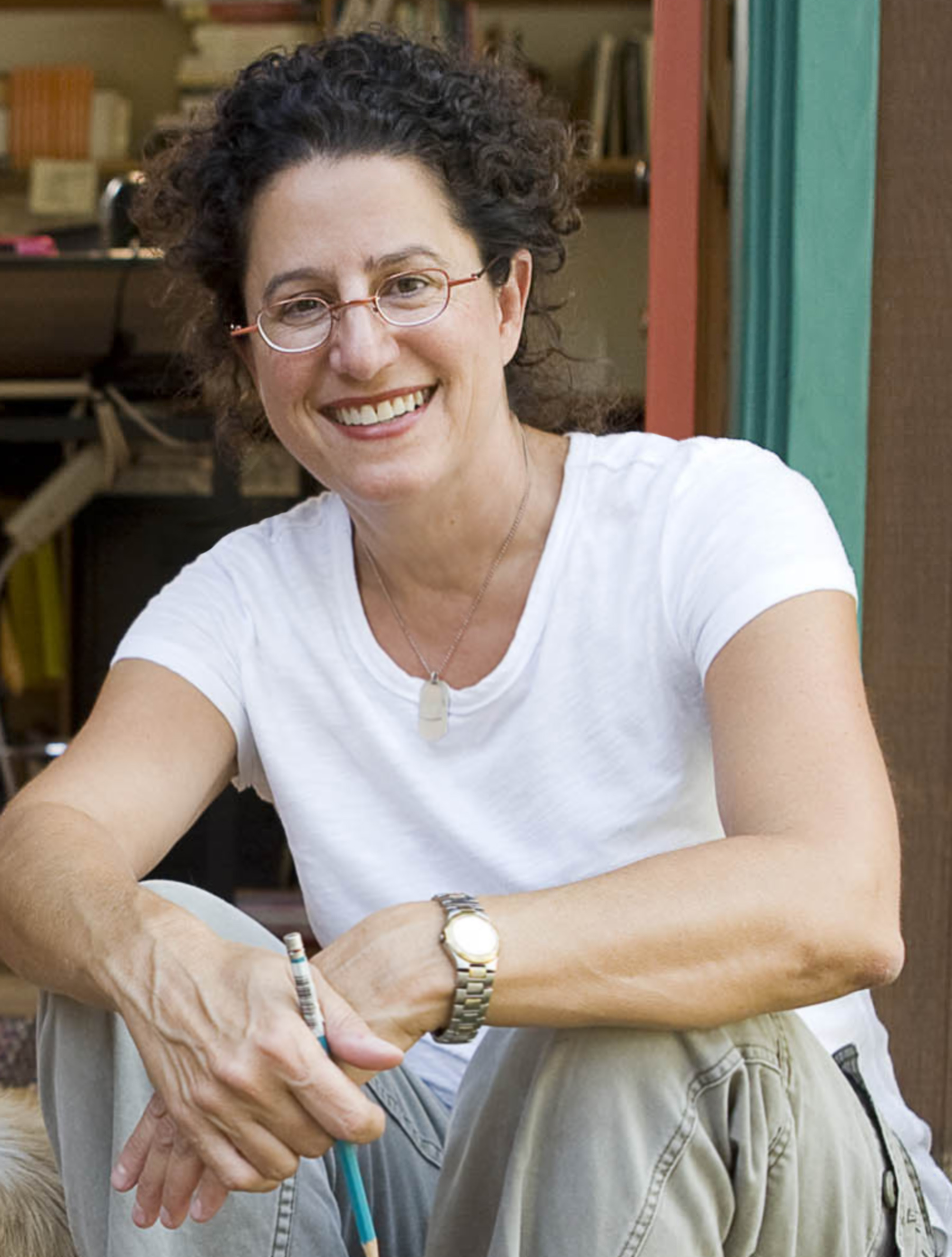
Three time honoree Marla Frazee also wrote and illustrated The Boss Baby.

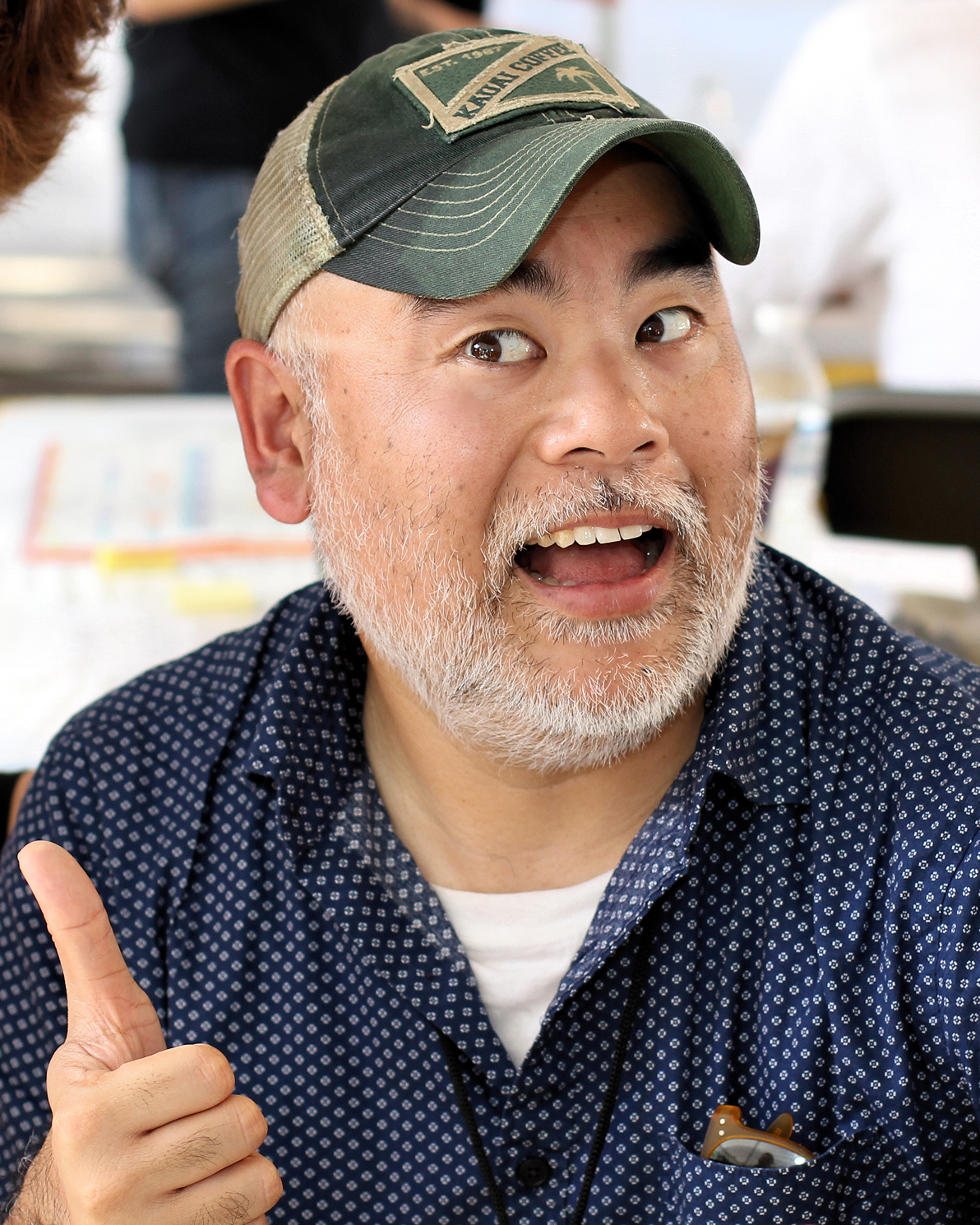
Caldecott winner Dan Santat turned down the chance to work full time for Google creating their Google Doodles so he could keep pursuing children book illustration.

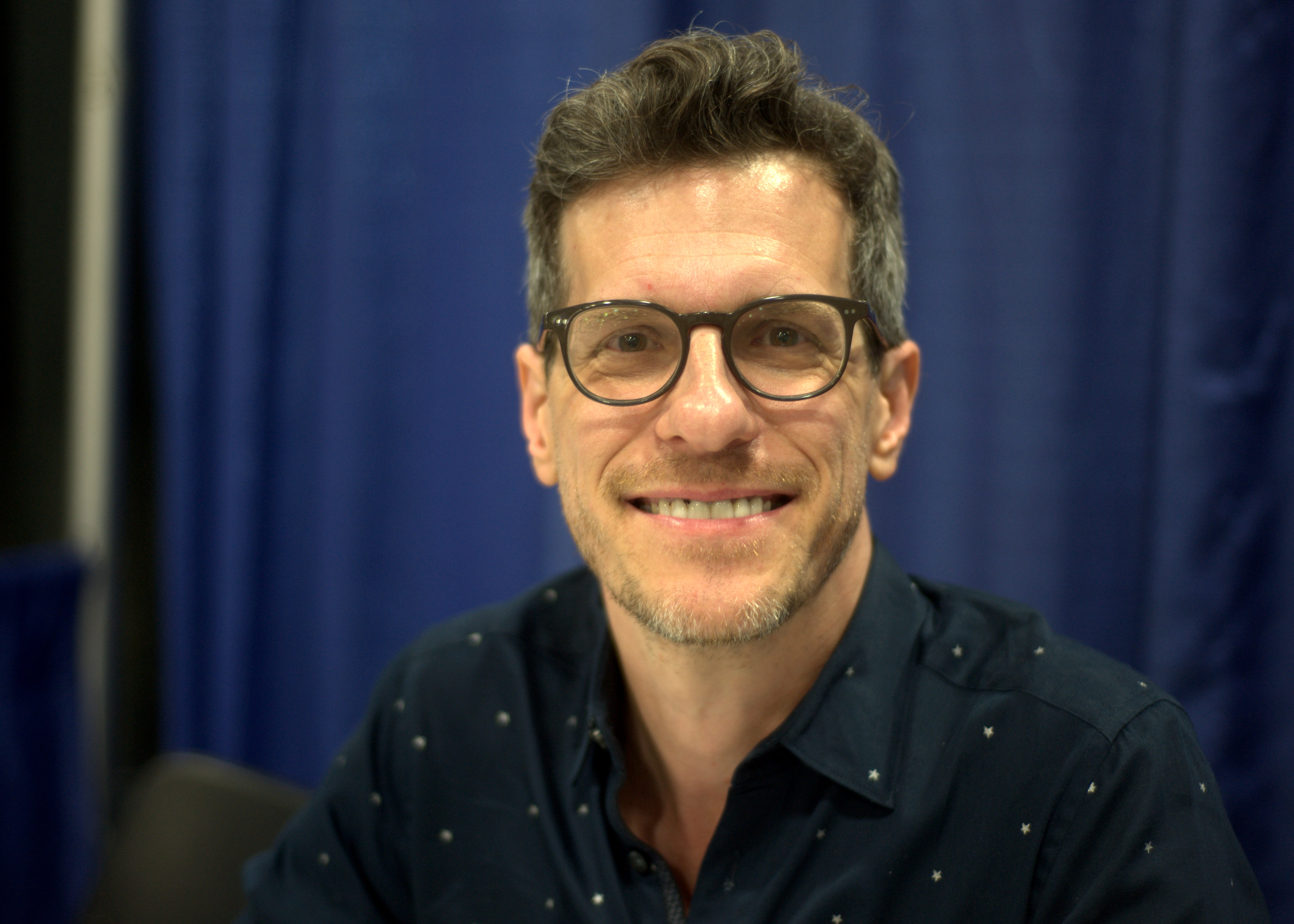
Brian Selznick's book The Invention of Hugo Cabret was the first novel to win the Caldecott.

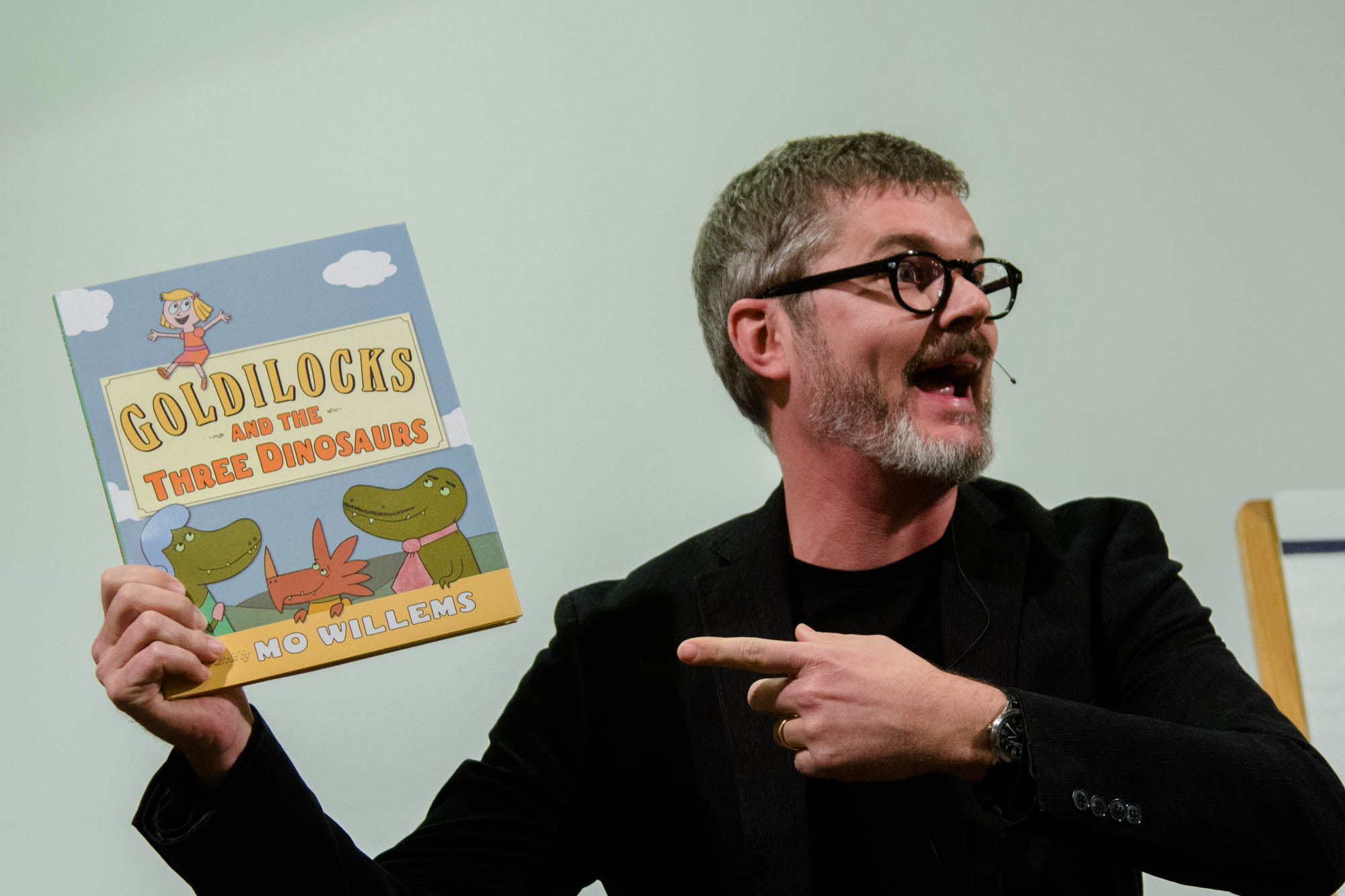
Mo Willems has been honored with other ALA awards including the Carnegie Medal for Excellence in Children's Video and the Geisel Award for his early readers.

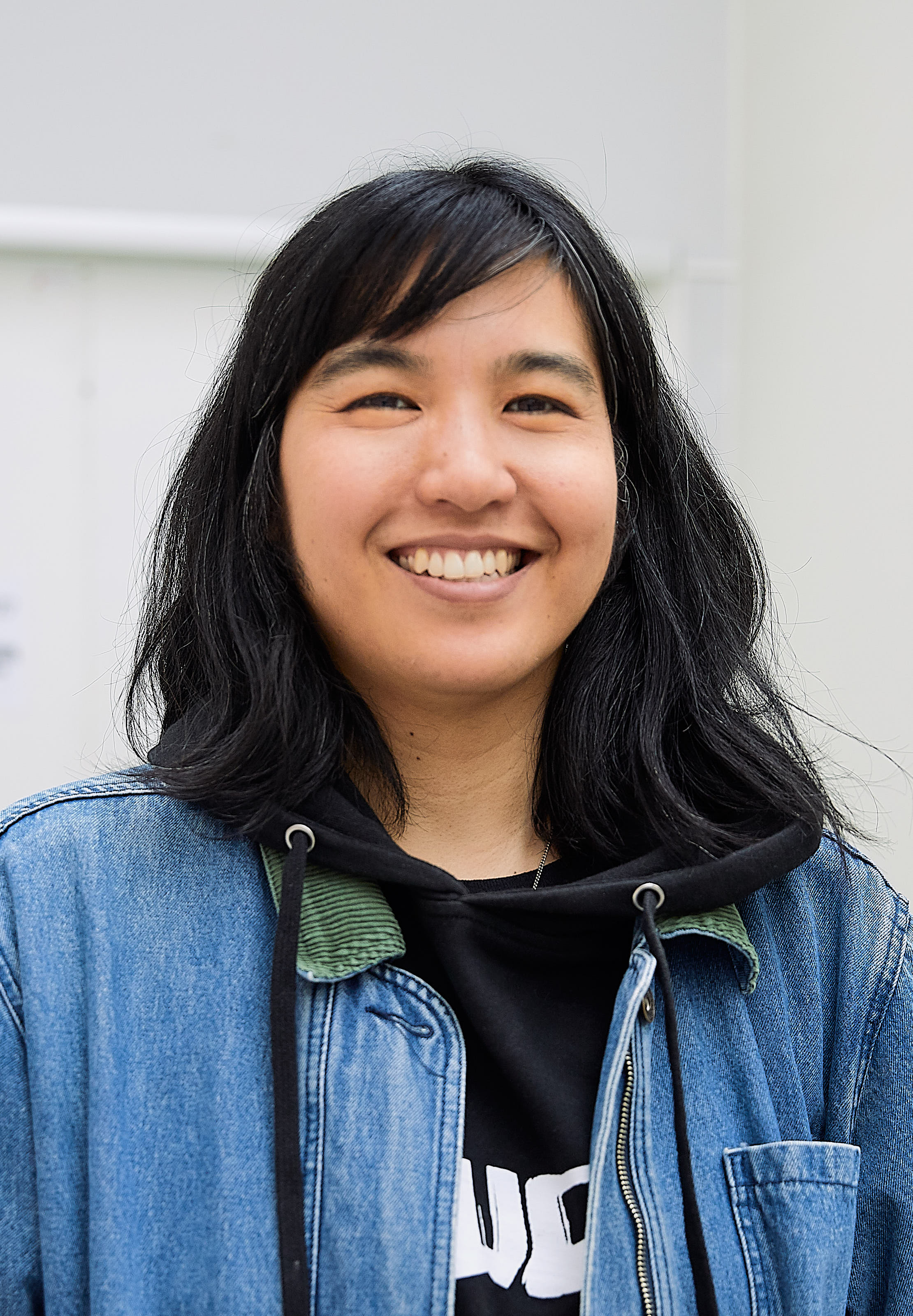
Jillian Tamaki's 2015 winner This One Summer was the first and, as of 2020, only graphic novel to win the Caldecott Honor.

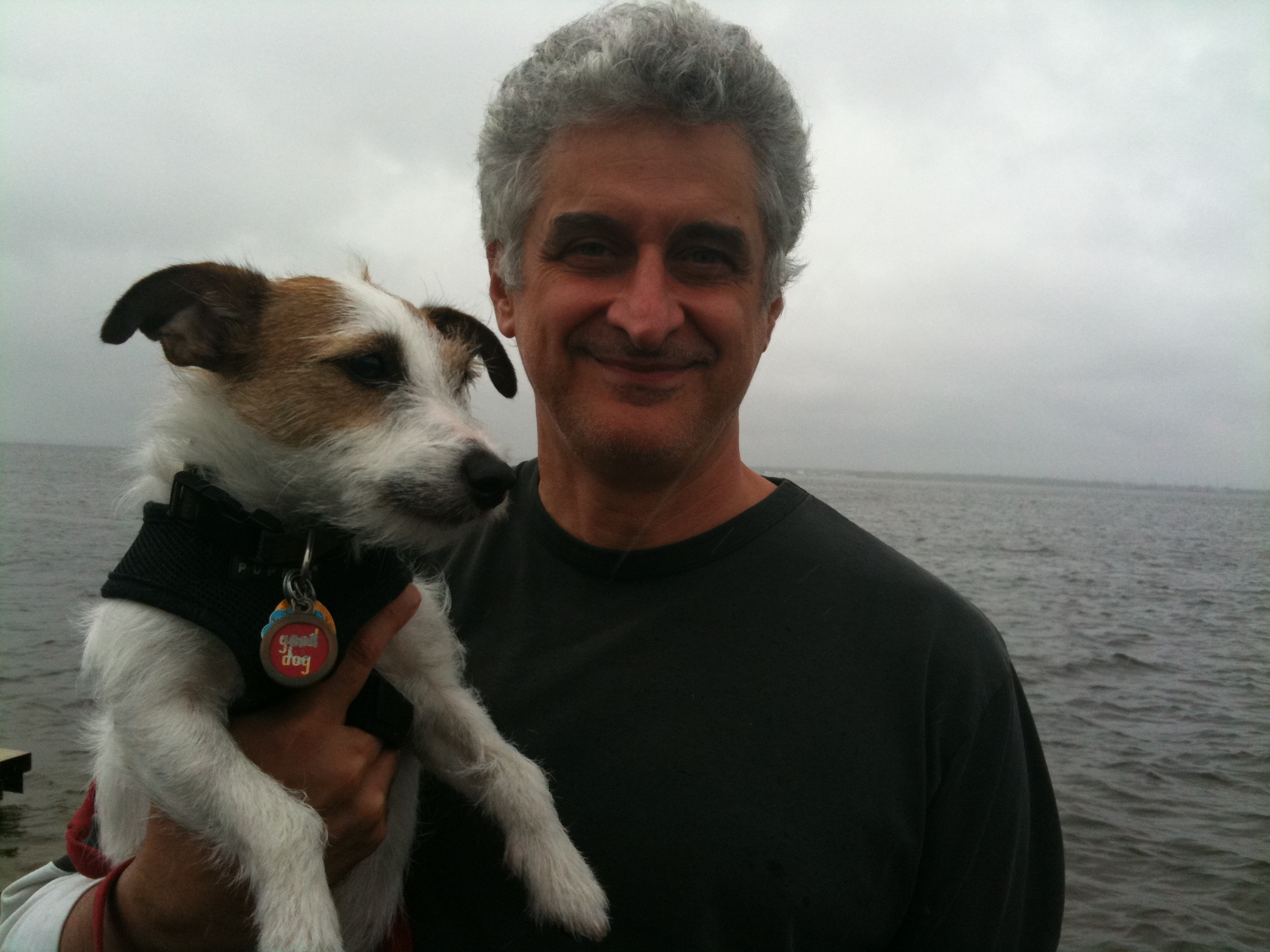
Patrick McDonnell mentioned Jane Goodall in his syndicated Mutts comicstrip. This attracted the Jane Goodall Institute's attention and eventually led to his 2012 honor book Me... Jane.

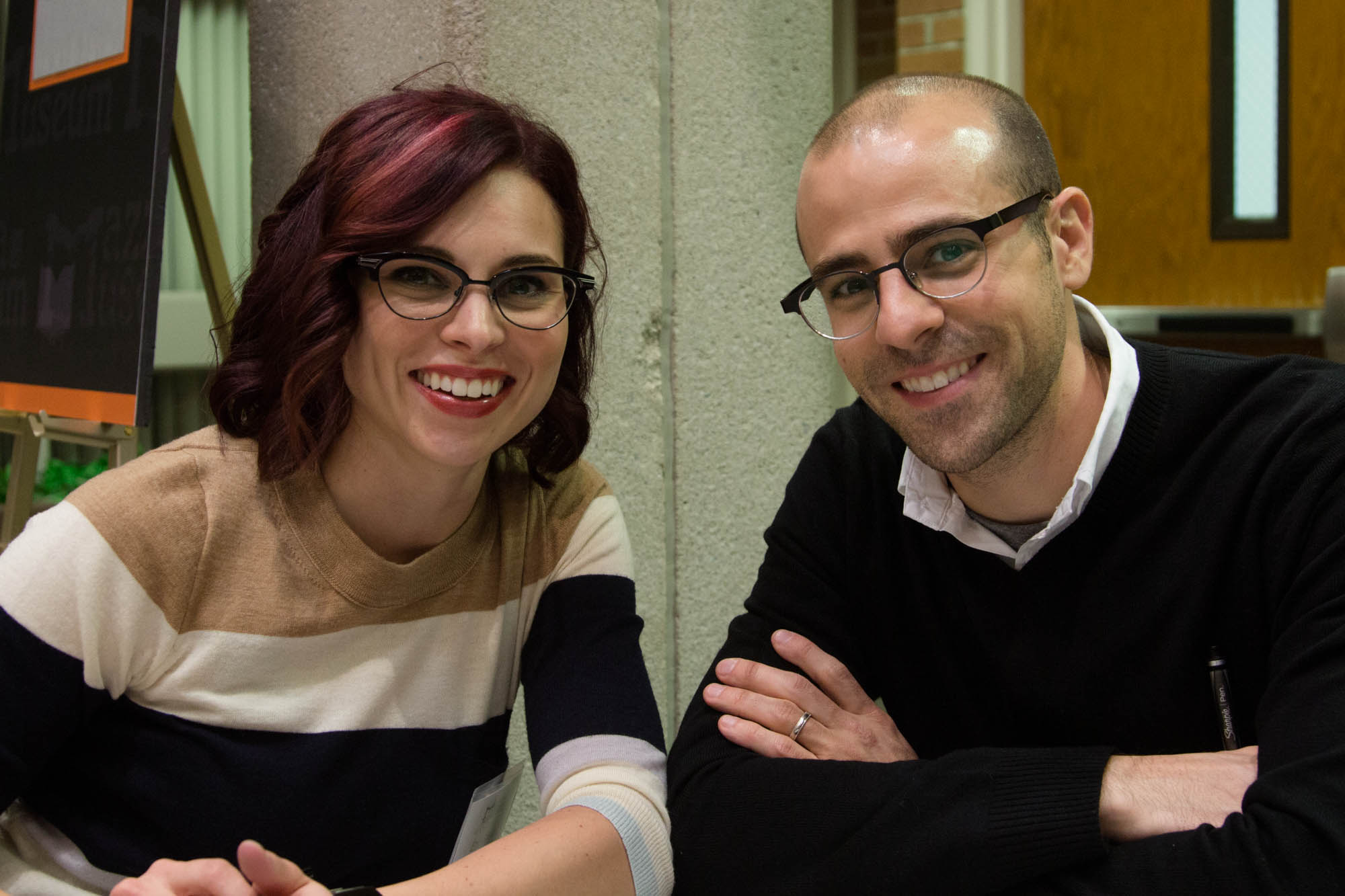
Erin E. Stead (left) won the 2011 Caldecott for her very first book which was written by her husband, Phillip (right).

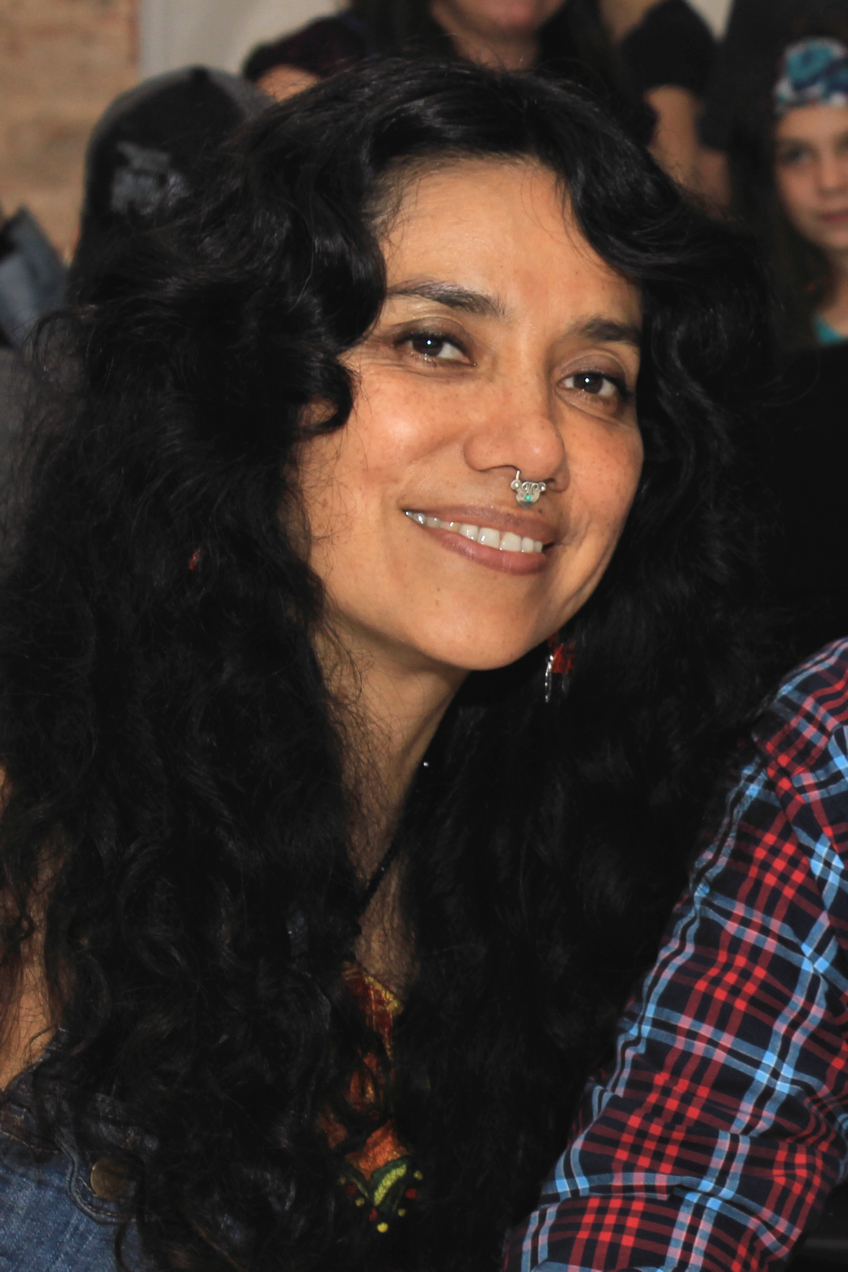
Yuyi Morales was the first Latina Caldecott recipient in 2016.

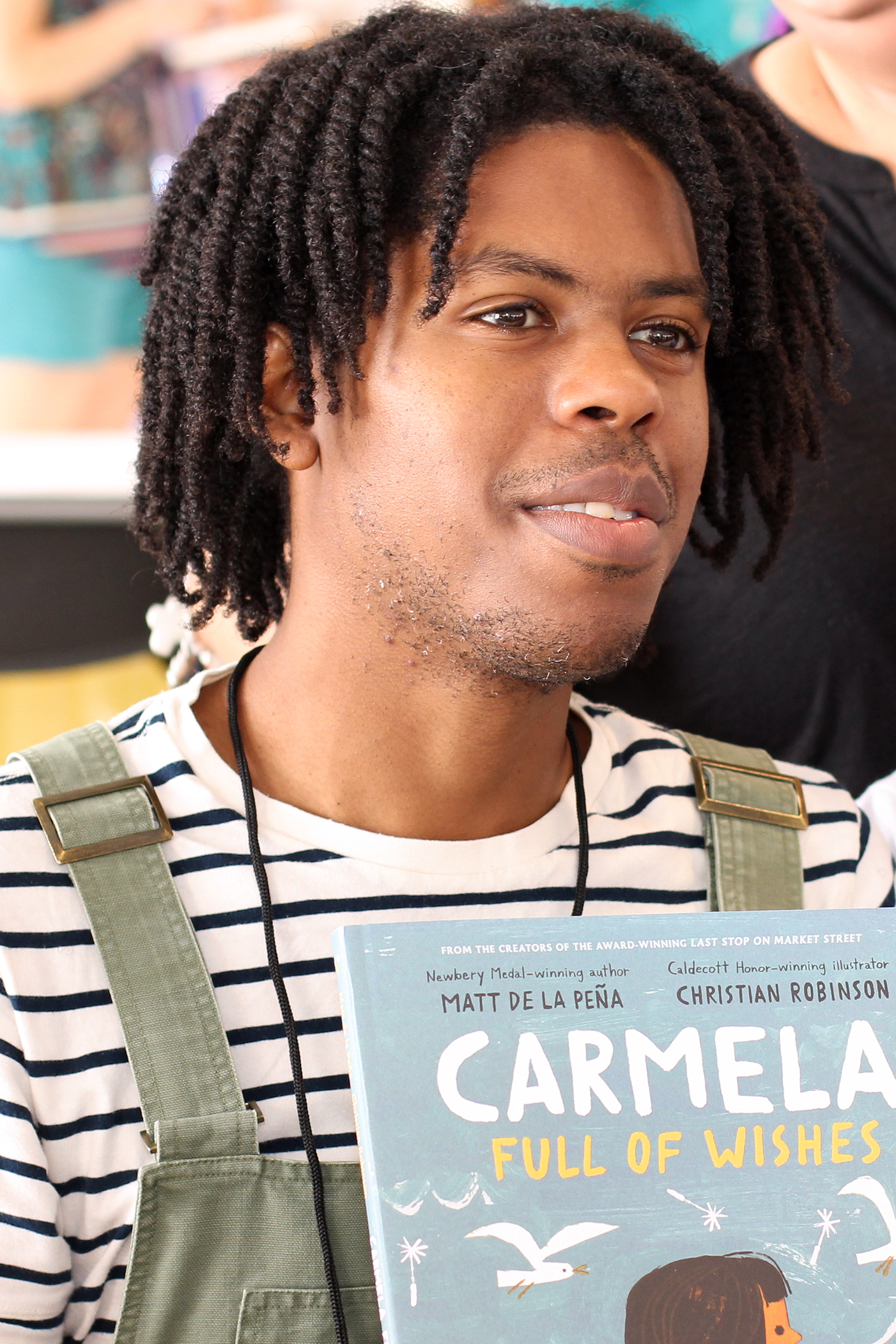
Last Stop on Market Street won its author, Matt de la Peña, a Newbery Medal while illustrator Christian Robinson (pictured) won a Caldecott Honor.

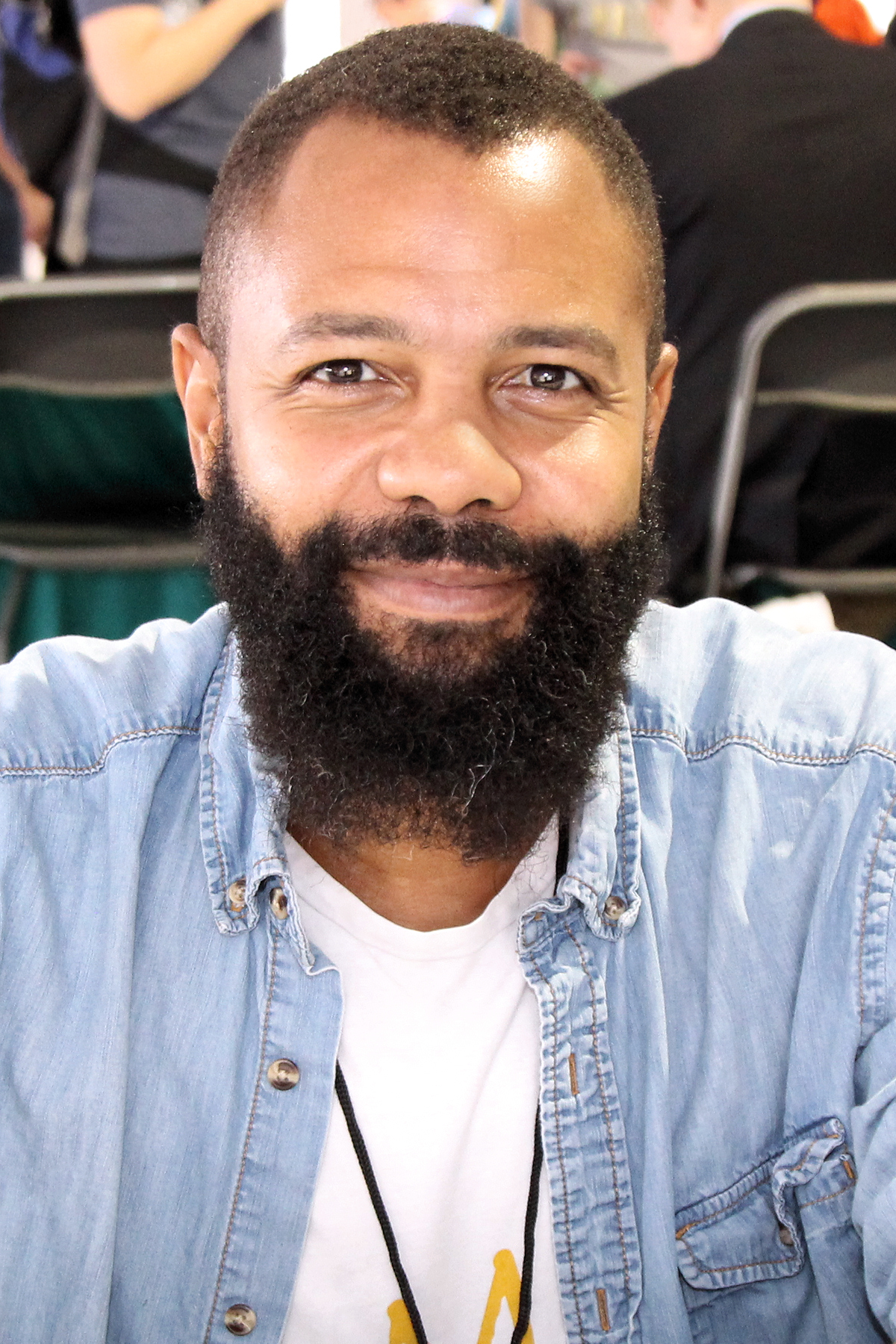
Javaka Steptoe (pictured), 2017's winner, is the son of two-time honors winner John Steptoe.

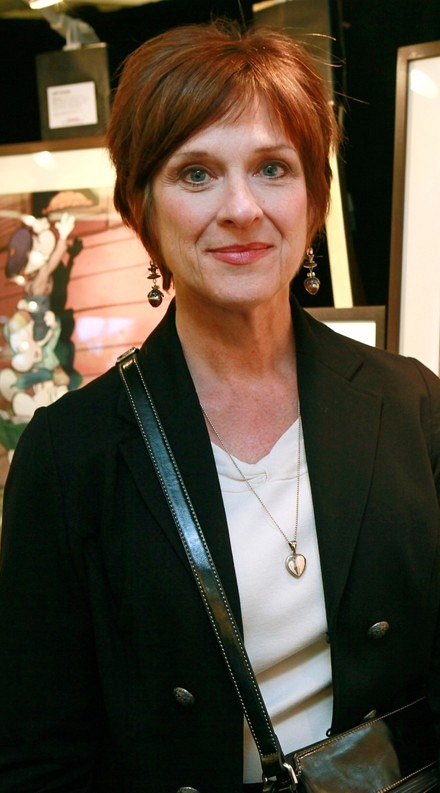
2015 Caldecott Honor recipient Mary GrandPré illustrated the covers and chapter illustrations for the United States editions of the Harry Potter books.

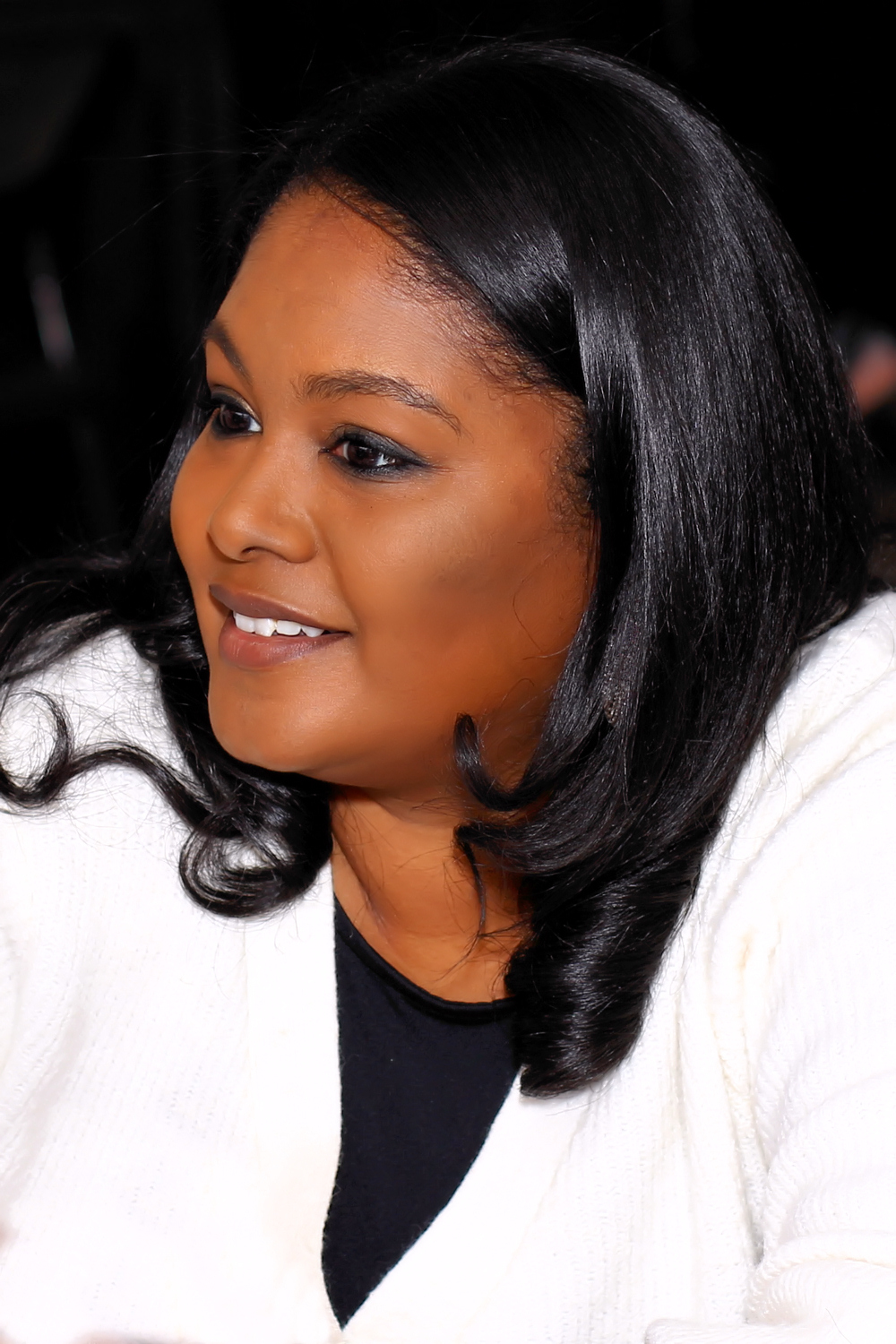
Vashti Harrison, who won the 2024 Caldecott for her debut picture book Big, was the first African-American woman to win the award.

Winners and Honor Books
Year	Illustrator	Book	Award
1938	Dorothy P. Lathrop	Animals of the Bible	Winner
1938	Robert Lawson	Four and Twenty Blackbirds	Honor
1938	Boris Artzybasheff	Seven Simeons: A Russian Tale	Honor
1939	Thomas Handforth	Mei Li	Winner
1939	James Daugherty	Andy and the Lion	Honor
1939	Clare Turlay Newberry	Barkis	Honor
1939	Laura Adams Armer	The Forest Pool	Honor
1939	Wanda Gág	Snow White and the Seven Dwarfs	Honor
1939	Robert Lawson	Wee Gillis	Honor
1940	Ingri and Edgar Parin d'Aulaire	Abraham Lincoln	Winner
1940	Berta and Elmer Hader	Cock-a-Doodle Doo	Honor
1940	Ludwig Bemelmans	Madeline	Honor
1940	Lauren Ford	The Ageless Story	Honor
1941	Robert Lawson	They Were Strong and Good	Winner
1941	Clare Turlay Newberry	April's Kittens	Honor
1942	Robert McCloskey	Make Way for Ducklings	Winner
1942	Maud and Miska Petersham	An American ABC	Honor
1942	Velino Herrera	In My Mother's House	Honor
1942	Holling C. Holling	Paddle-to-the-Sea	Honor
1942	Wanda Gág	Nothing at All	Honor
1943	Virginia Lee Burton	The Little House	Winner
1943	Mary and Conrad Buff	Dash and Dart	Honor
1943	Clare Turlay Newberry	Marshmallow	Honor
1944	Louis Slobodkin	Many Moons	Winner
1944	Elizabeth Orton Jones	Small Rain: Verses From The Bible	Honor
1944	Arnold E. Bare	Pierre Pidgeon	Honor
1944	Berta and Elmer Hader	The Mighty Hunter	Honor
1944	Jean Charlot	A Child's Good Night Book	Honor
1944	Plato Chan	The Good-Luck Horse	Honor
1945	Elizabeth Orton Jones	Prayer for a Child	Winner
1945	Tasha Tudor	Mother Goose	Honor
1945	Marie Hall Ets	In the Forest	Honor
1945	Marguerite de Angeli	Yonie Wondernose	Honor
1945	Kate Seredy	The Christmas Anna Angel	Honor
1946	Maud and Miska Petersham	The Rooster Crows	Winner
1946	Leonard Weisgard	Little Lost Lamb	Honor
1946	Marjorie Torrey	Sing Mother Goose	Honor
1946	Ruth Chrisman Gannett	My Mother Is the Most Beautiful Woman in the World	Honor
1946	Kurt Wiese	You Can Write Chinese	Honor
1947	Leonard Weisgard	The Little Island	Winner
1947	Leonard Weisgard	Rain Drop Splash	Honor
1947	Jay Hyde Barnum	Boats on the River	Honor
1947	Tony Palazzo	Timothy Turtle	Honor
1947	Leo Politi	Pedro, the Angel of Olvera Street	Honor
1947	Marjorie Torrey	Sing in Praise: A Collection of the Best Loved Hymns	Honor
1948	Roger Duvoisin	White Snow, Bright Snow	Winner
1948	Marcia Brown	Stone Soup	Honor
1948	Dr. Seuss	McElligot's Pool	Honor
1948	Georges Schreiber	Bambino the Clown	Honor
1948	Hildegard Woodward	Roger and the Fox	Honor
1948	Virginia Lee Burton	Song of Robin Hood	Honor
1949	Berta and Elmer Hader	The Big Snow	Winner
1949	Robert McCloskey	Blueberries for Sal	Honor
1949	Helen Stone	All Around the Town	Honor
1949	Leo Politi	Juanita	Honor
1949	Kurt Wiese	Fish in the Air	Honor
1950	Leo Politi	Song of the Swallows	Winner
1950	Lynd Ward	America's Ethan Allen	Honor
1950	Hildegard Woodward	The Wild Birthday Cake	Honor
1950	Marc Simont	The Happy Day	Honor
1950	Dr. Seuss	Bartholomew and the Oobleck	Honor
1950	Marcia Brown	Henry – Fisherman	Honor
1951	Katherine Milhous	The Egg Tree	Winner
1951	Marcia Brown	Dick Whittington and His Cat	Honor
1951	Nicholas Mordvinoff	The Two Reds	Honor
1951	Dr. Seuss	If I Ran the Zoo	Honor
1951	Helen Stone	The Most Wonderful Doll in the World	Honor
1951	Clare Turlay Newberry	T-Bone, the Baby Sitter	Honor
1952	Nicholas Mordvinoff	Finders Keepers	Winner
1952	Marie Hall Ets	Mr. T. W. Anthony Woo	Honor
1952	Marcia Brown	Skipper John's Cook	Honor
1952	Margaret Bloy Graham	All Falling Down	Honor
1952	William Pène du Bois	Bear Party	Honor
1952	Elizabeth Olds	Feather Mountain	Honor
1953	Lynd Ward	The Biggest Bear	Winner
1953	Marcia Brown	Puss in Boots	Honor
1953	Robert McCloskey	One Morning in Maine	Honor
1953	Fritz Eichenberg	Ape in a Cape: An Alphabet of Odd Animals	Honor
1953	Margaret Bloy Graham	The Storm Book	Honor
1953	Juliet Kepes	Five Little Monkeys	Honor
1954	Ludwig Bemelmans	Madeline's Rescue	Winner
1954	Robert McCloskey	Journey Cake, Ho!	Honor
1954	Jean Charlot	When Will the World Be Mine?	Honor
1954	Marcia Brown	The Steadfast Tin Soldier	Honor
1954	Maurice Sendak	A Very Special House	Honor
1954	Abe Birnbaum	Green Eyes	Honor
1955	Marcia Brown	Cinderella, or the Little Glass Slipper	Winner
1955	Marguerite de Angeli	Book of Nursery and Mother Goose Rhymes	Honor
1955	Tibor Gergely	Wheel on the Chimney	Honor
1955	Helen Sewell	The Thanksgiving Story	Honor
1956	Feodor Rojankovsky	Frog Went A-Courtin'	Winner
1956	Marie Hall Ets	Play With Me	Honor
1956	Taro Yashima	Crow Boy	Honor
1957	Marc Simont	A Tree Is Nice	Winner
1957	Marie Hall Ets	Mr. Penny's Race Horse	Honor
1957	Tasha Tudor	1 Is One	Honor
1957	Paul Galdone	Anatole	Honor
1957	James Daugherty	Gillespie and the Guards	Honor
1957	William Pène du Bois	Lion	Honor
1958	Robert McCloskey	Time of Wonder	Winner
1958	Don Freeman	Fly High, Fly Low	Honor
1958	Paul Galdone	Anatole and the Cat	Honor
1959	Barbara Cooney	Chanticleer and the Fox	Winner
1959	Antonio Frasconi	The House that Jack Built: La Maison Que Jacques A Batie	Honor
1959	Maurice Sendak	What Do You Say, Dear?	Honor
1959	Taro Yashima	Umbrella	Honor
1960	Marie Hall Ets	Nine Days to Christmas	Winner
1960	Adrienne Adams	Houses from the Sea	Honor
1960	Maurice Sendak	The Moon Jumpers	Honor
1961	Nicolas Sidjakov	Baboushka and the Three Kings	Winner
1961	Leo Lionni	Inch by Inch	Honor
1962	Marcia Brown	Once a Mouse	Winner
1962	Peter Spier	Fox Went out on a Chilly Night: An Old Song	Honor
1962	Maurice Sendak	Little Bear's Visit	Honor
1962	Adrienne Adams	The Day We Saw the Sun Come Up	Honor
1963	Ezra Jack Keats	The Snowy Day	Winner
1963	Bernarda Bryson	The Sun Is a Golden Earring	Honor
1963	Maurice Sendak	Mr. Rabbit and the Lovely Present	Honor
1964	Maurice Sendak	Where the Wild Things Are	Winner
1964	Leo Lionni	Swimmy	Honor
1964	Evaline Ness	All in the Morning Early	Honor
1964	Philip Reed	Mother Goose and Nursery Rhymes	Honor
1965	Beni Montresor	May I Bring a Friend?	Winner
1965	Marvin Bileck	Rain Makes Applesauce	Honor
1965	Blair Lent	The Wave	Honor
1965	Evaline Ness	A Pocketful of Cricket	Honor
1966	Nonny Hogrogian	Always Room for One More	Winner
1966	Roger Duvoisin	Hide and Seek Fog	Honor
1966	Marie Hall Ets	Just Me	Honor
1966	Evaline Ness	Tom Tit Tot	Honor
1967	Evaline Ness	Sam, Bangs & Moonshine	Winner
1967	Ed Emberley	One Wide River to Cross	Honor
1968	Ed Emberley	Drummer Hoff	Winner
1968	Leo Lionni	Frederick	Honor
1968	Taro Yashima	Seashore Story	Honor
1968	Ed Young	The Emperor and the Kite	Honor
1969	Uri Shulevitz	The Fool of the World and the Flying Ship	Winner
1969	Blair Lent	Why the Sun and the Moon Live in the Sky	Honor
1970	William Steig	Sylvester and the Magic Pebble	Winner
1970	Ezra Jack Keats	Goggles!	Honor
1970	Leo Lionni	Alexander and the Wind-Up Mouse	Honor
1970	Robert Andrew Parker	Pop Corn & Ma Goodness	Honor
1970	Brinton Turkle	Thy Friend, Obadiah	Honor
1970	Margot Zemach	The Judge: An Untrue Tale	Honor
1971	Gail E. Haley	A Story a Story	Winner
1971	Blair Lent	The Angry Moon	Honor
1971	Arnold Lobel	Frog and Toad Are Friends	Honor
1971	Maurice Sendak	In the Night Kitchen	Honor
1972	Nonny Hogrogian	One Fine Day	Winner
1972	Arnold Lobel	Hildilid's Night	Honor
1972	Janina Domanska	If All the Seas Were One Sea	Honor
1972	Tom Feelings	Moja Means One: Swahili Counting Book	Honor
1973	Blair Lent	The Funny Little Woman	Winner
1973	Gerald McDermott	Anansi the Spider: A Tale from the Ashanti	Honor
1973	Leonard Baskin	Hosie's Alphabet	Honor
1973	Nancy Ekholm Burkert	Snow-White and the Seven Dwarfs	Honor
1973	Tom Bahti	When Clay Sings	Honor
1974	Margot Zemach	Duffy and the Devil	Winner
1974	Susan Jeffers	Three Jovial Huntsmen	Honor
1974	David Macaulay	Cathedral	Honor
1975	Gerald McDermott	Arrow to the Sun	Winner
1975	Tom Feelings	Jambo Means Hello: A Swahili Alphabet Book	Honor
1976	Leo and Diane Dillon	Why Mosquitoes Buzz in People's Ears	Winner
1976	Peter Parnall	The Desert Is Theirs	Honor
1976	Tomie dePaola	Strega Nona	Honor
1977	Leo and Diane Dillon	Ashanti to Zulu: African Traditions	Winner
1977	William Steig	The Amazing Bone	Honor
1977	Nonny Hogrogian	The Contest	Honor
1977	M. B. Goffstein	Fish for Supper	Honor
1977	Beverly Brodsky McDermott	The Golem: A Jewish Legend	Honor
1977	Peter Parnall	Hawk, I'm Your Brother	Honor
1978	Peter Spier	Noah's Ark	Winner
1978	David Macaulay	Castle	Honor
1978	Margot Zemach	It Could Always Be Worse	Honor
1979	Paul Goble	The Girl Who Loved Wild Horses	Winner
1979	Donald Crews	Freight Train	Honor
1979	Peter Parnall	The Way to Start a Day	Honor
1980	Barbara Cooney	Ox-Cart Man	Winner
1980	Rachel Isadora	Ben's Trumpet	Honor
1980	Chris Van Allsburg	The Garden of Abdul Gasazi	Honor
1980	Uri Shulevitz	The Treasure	Honor
1981	Arnold Lobel	Fables	Winner
1981	Ilse Plume	The Bremen-Town Musicians	Honor
1981	Molly Bang	The Grey Lady and the Strawberry Snatcher	Honor
1981	Joseph Low	Mice Twice	Honor
1981	Donald Crews	Truck	Honor
1982	Chris Van Allsburg	Jumanji	Winner
1982	Stephen Gammell	Where the Buffaloes Begin	Honor
1982	Anita Lobel	On Market Street	Honor
1982	Maurice Sendak	Outside Over There	Honor
1982	Alice and Martin Provensen	A Visit to William Blake's Inn: Poems for Innocent and Experienced Travelers	Honor
1983	Marcia Brown	Shadow	Winner
1983	Vera B. Williams	A Chair for My Mother	Honor
1983	Diane Goode	When I Was Young in the Mountains	Honor
1984	Alice and Martin Provensen	The Glorious Flight: Across the Channel with Louis Bleriot	Winner
1984	Trina Schart Hyman	Little Red Riding Hood	Honor
1984	Molly Bang	Ten, Nine, Eight	Honor
1985	Trina Schart Hyman	Saint George and the Dragon	Winner
1985	Paul O. Zelinsky	Hansel and Gretel	Honor
1985	Nancy Tafuri	Have You Seen My Duckling?	Honor
1985	John Steptoe	The Story of Jumping Mouse: A Native American Legend	Honor
1986	Chris Van Allsburg	The Polar Express	Winner
1986	Stephen Gammell	The Relatives Came	Honor
1986	Don Wood	King Bidgood's in the Bathtub	Honor
1987	Richard Egielski	Hey, Al	Winner
1987	Ann Grifalconi	The Village of Round and Square Houses	Honor
1987	Suse MacDonald	Alphabatics	Honor
1987	Paul O. Zelinsky	Rumpelstiltskin	Honor
1988	John Schoenherr	Owl Moon	Winner
1988	John Steptoe	Mufaro's Beautiful Daughters	Honor
1989	Stephen Gammell	Song and Dance Man	Winner
1989	Allen Say	The Boy of the Three-Year Nap	Honor
1989	David Wiesner	Free Fall	Honor
1989	James Marshall	Goldilocks and the Three Bears	Honor
1989	Jerry Pinkney	Mirandy and Brother Wind	Honor
1990	Ed Young	Lon Po Po: A Red-Riding Hood Story from China	Winner
1990	Bill Peet	Bill Peet: An Autobiography	Honor
1990	Lois Ehlert	Color Zoo	Honor
1990	Jerry Pinkney	The Talking Eggs: A Folktale from the American South	Honor
1990	Trina Schart Hyman	Hershel and the Hanukkah Goblins	Honor
1991	David Macaulay	Black and White	Winner
1991	Fred Marcellino	Puss in Boots	Honor
1991	Vera B. Williams	"More More More," Said the Baby: Three Love Stories	Honor
1992	David Wiesner	Tuesday	Winner
1992	Faith Ringgold	Tar Beach	Honor
1993	Emily Arnold McCully	Mirette on the High Wire	Winner
1993	Lane Smith	The Stinky Cheese Man and Other Fairly Stupid Tales	Honor
1993	Ed Young	Seven Blind Mice	Honor
1993	Carole Byard	Working Cotton	Honor
1994	Allen Say	Grandfather's Journey	Winner
1994	Ted Lewin	Peppe the Lamplighter	Honor
1994	Denise Fleming	In the Small, Small Pond	Honor
1994	Gerald McDermott	Raven: A Trickster Tale From The Pacific Northwest	Honor
1994	Kevin Henkes	Owen	Honor
1994	Chris Raschka	Yo! Yes?	Honor
1995	David Diaz	Smoky Night	Winner
1995	Jerry Pinkney	John Henry	Honor
1995	Paul O. Zelinsky	Swamp Angel	Honor
1995	Eric Rohmann	Time Flies	Honor
1996	Peggy Rathmann	Officer Buckle and Gloria	Winner
1996	Stephen T. Johnson	Alphabet City	Honor
1996	Marjorie Priceman	Zin! Zin! Zin! a Violin	Honor
1996	Brian Pinkney	The Faithful Friend	Honor
1996	Janet Stevens	Tops & Bottoms	Honor
1997	David Wisniewski	Golem	Winner
1997	Holly Meade	Hush!: A Thai Lullaby	Honor
1997	David Pelletier	The Graphic Alphabet	Honor
1997	Dav Pilkey	The Paperboy	Honor
1997	Peter Sís	Starry Messenger	Honor
1998	Paul O. Zelinsky	Rapunzel	Winner
1998	David Small	The Gardener	Honor
1998	Christopher Myers	Harlem	Honor
1998	Simms Taback	There Was an Old Lady Who Swallowed a Fly	Honor
1999	Mary Azarian	Snowflake Bentley	Winner
1999	Brian Pinkney	Duke Ellington: The Piano Prince and His Orchestra	Honor
1999	David Shannon	No, David!	Honor
1999	Uri Shulevitz	Snow	Honor
1999	Peter Sís	Tibet: Through the Red Box	Honor
2000	Simms Taback	Joseph Had a Little Overcoat	Winner
2000	Trina Schart Hyman	A Child's Calendar	Honor
2000	David Wiesner	Sector 7	Honor
2000	Molly Bang	When Sophie Gets Angry-Really, Really Angry	Honor
2000	Jerry Pinkney	The Ugly Duckling	Honor
2001	David Small	So You Want to Be President?	Winner
2001	Christopher Bing	Casey at the Bat	Honor
2001	Betsy Lewin	Click, Clack, Moo: Cows That Type	Honor
2001	Ian Falconer	Olivia	Honor
2002	David Wiesner	The Three Pigs	Winner
2002	Brian Selznick	The Dinosaurs of Waterhouse Hawkins	Honor
2002	Bryan Collier	Martin's Big Words: the Life of Dr. Martin Luther King, Jr.	Honor
2002	Marc Simont	The Stray Dog	Honor
2003	Eric Rohmann	My Friend Rabbit	Winner
2003	Tony DiTerlizzi	The Spider and the Fly	Honor
2003	Peter McCarty	Hondo & Fabian	Honor
2003	Jerry Pinkney	Noah's Ark	Honor
2004	Mordicai Gerstein	The Man Who Walked Between the Towers	Winner
2004	Margaret Chodos-Irvine	Ella Sarah Gets Dressed	Honor
2004	Steve Jenkins and Robin Page	What Do You Do with a Tail Like This?	Honor
2004	Mo Willems	Don't Let the Pigeon Drive the Bus!	Honor
2005	Kevin Henkes	Kitten's First Full Moon	Winner
2005	Barbara Lehman	The Red Book	Honor
2005	E. B. Lewis	Coming on Home Soon	Honor
2005	Mo Willems	Knuffle Bunny: A Cautionary Tale	Honor
2006	Chris Raschka	The Hello, Goodbye Window	Winner
2006	Bryan Collier	Rosa	Honor
2006	Jon J. Muth	Zen Shorts	Honor
2006	Marjorie Priceman	Hot Air: The (Mostly) True Story of the First Hot-Air Balloon Ride	Honor
2006	Beckie Prange	Song of the Water Boatman and Other Pond Poems	Honor
2007	David Wiesner	Flotsam	Winner
2007	David McLimans	Gone Wild: An Endangered Animal Alphabet	Honor
2007	Kadir Nelson	Moses: When Harriet Tubman Led Her People to Freedom	Honor
2008	Brian Selznick	The Invention of Hugo Cabret	Winner
2008	Kadir Nelson	Henry's Freedom Box: A True Story from the Underground Railroad	Honor
2008	Laura Vaccaro Seeger	First the Egg	Honor
2008	Peter Sís	The Wall: Growing Up Behind the Iron Curtain	Honor
2008	Mo Willems	Knuffle Bunny Too: A Case of Mistaken Identity	Honor
2009	Beth Krommes	The House in the Night	Winner
2009	Marla Frazee	A Couple of Boys Have the Best Week Ever	Honor
2009	Uri Shulevitz	How I Learned Geography	Honor
2009	Melissa Sweet	A River of Words: The Story of William Carlos Williams	Honor
2010	Jerry Pinkney	The Lion & the Mouse	Winner
2010	Marla Frazee	All the World	Honor
2010	Pamela Zagarenski	Red Sings from Treetops: A Year in Colors	Honor
2011	Erin E. Stead	A Sick Day for Amos McGee	Winner
2011	Bryan Collier	Dave the Potter: Artist, Poet, Slave	Honor
2011	David Ezra Stein	Interrupting Chicken	Honor
2012	Chris Raschka	A Ball for Daisy	Winner
2012	John Rocco	Blackout	Honor
2012	Lane Smith	Grandpa Green	Honor
2012	Patrick McDonnell	Me... Jane	Honor
2013	Jon Klassen	This is Not My Hat	Winner
2013	Peter Brown	Creepy Carrots!	Honor
2013	Jon Klassen	Extra Yarn	Honor
2013	Laura Vaccaro Seeger	Green	Honor
2013	David Small	One Cool Friend	Honor
2013	Pamela Zagarenski	Sleep Like a Tiger	Honor
2014	Brian Floca	Locomotive	Winner
2014	Aaron Becker	Journey	Honor
2014	Molly Idle	Flora and the Flamingo	Honor
2014	David Wiesner	Mr. Wuffles!	Honor
2015	Dan Santat	The Adventures of Beekle: The Unimaginary Friend	Winner
2015	Lauren Castillo	Nana in the City	Honor
2015	Mary GrandPré	The Noisy Paint Box: The Colors and Sounds of Kandinsky’s Abstract Art	Honor
2015	Jon Klassen	Sam and Dave Dig a Hole	Honor
2015	Yuyi Morales	Viva Frida	Honor
2015	Melissa Sweet	The Right Word: Roget and His Thesaurus	Honor
2015	Jillian Tamaki	This One Summer	Honor
2016	Sophie Blackall	Finding Winnie: The True Story of the World’s Most Famous Bear	Winner
2016	Bryan Collier	Trombone Shorty	Honor
2016	Kevin Henkes	Waiting	Honor
2016	Ekua Holmes	Voice of Freedom: Fannie Lou Hamer, Spirit of the Civil Rights Movement	Honor
2016	Christian Robinson	Last Stop on Market Street	Honor
2017	Javaka Steptoe	Radiant Child: The Story of Young Artist Jean-Michel Basquiat	Winner
2017	Vera Brosgol	Leave Me Alone!	Honor
2017	R. Gregory Christie	Freedom in Congo Square	Honor
2017	Carson Ellis	Du Iz Tak?	Honor
2017	Brendan Wenzel	They All Saw a Cat	Honor
2018	Matthew Cordell	Wolf in the Snow	Winner
2018	Elisha Cooper	Big Cat, Little Cat	Honor
2018	Gordon C. James	Crown: An Ode to the Fresh Cut	Honor
2018	Thi Bui	A Different Pond	Honor
2018	Jason Chin	Grand Canyon	Honor
2019	Sophie Blackall	Hello Lighthouse	Winner
2019	Juana Martinez-Neal	Alma and How She Got Her Name	Honor
2019	Grace Lin	A Big Mooncake for Little Star	Honor
2019	Brian Lies	The Rough Patch	Honor
2019	Oge Mora	Thank You, Omu!	Honor
2020	Kadir Nelson	The Undefeated	Winner
2020	LeUyen Pham	Bear Came Along	Honor
2020	Rudy Gutierrez	Double Bass Blues	Honor
2020	Daniel Minter	Going Down Home with Daddy	Honor
2021	Michaela Goade	We Are Water Protectors	Winner
2021	Noa Denmon	A Place Inside of Me	Honor
2021	Yuko Shimizu	The Cat Man of Aleppo	Honor
2021	Cozbi A. Cabrera	Me & Mama	Honor
2021	Cindy Derby	Outside In	Honor
2022	Jason Chin	Watercress	Winner
2022	Shawn Harris	Have You Ever Seen a Flower?	Honor
2022	Corey R. Tabor	Mel Fell	Honor
2022	Floyd Cooper	Unspeakable: The Tulsa Race Massacre	Honor
2022	Micha Archer	Wonder Walkers	Honor
2023	Doug Salati	Hot Dog	Winner
2023	Jason Griffin	Ain't Burned All the Bright	Honor
2023	Michaela Goade	Berry Song	Honor
2023	Janelle Washington	Choosing Brave: How Mamie Till-Mobley and Emmitt Till Sparked the Civil Rights Movement	Honor
2023	Christopher Denise	Knight Owl	Honor
2024	Vashti Harrison	Big	Winner
2024	Marla Frazee	In Every Life	Honor
2024	Molly Mendoza	Jovita Wore Pants: The Story of a Mexican Freedom Fighter	Honor
2024	Jerome Pumphrey and Jarrett Pumphrey	There Was a Party for Langston	Honor
2024	Hanna Cha	The Truth About Dragons	Honor
2025	Rebecca Lee Kunz	Chooch Helped	Winner
2025	CG Esperanza	My Daddy is a Cowboy	Honor
2025	Gracey Zhang	Noodles on a Bicycle	Honor
2025	Cherry Mo	Home in a Lunchbox	Honor
2025	Yuko Shimizu	Up, Up, Ever Up! Junko Tabei: A Life in the Mountains	Honor
2026	Cátia Chien	Fireworks	Winner
2026	Jashar Awan	Every Monday Mabel	Honor
2026	Angie Kang	Our Lake	Honor
2026	Drew Beckmeyer	Stalactite & Stalagmite: A Big Tale from a Little Cave	Honor
2026	Zeke Peña	Sundust	Honor

== Multiple award winners ==
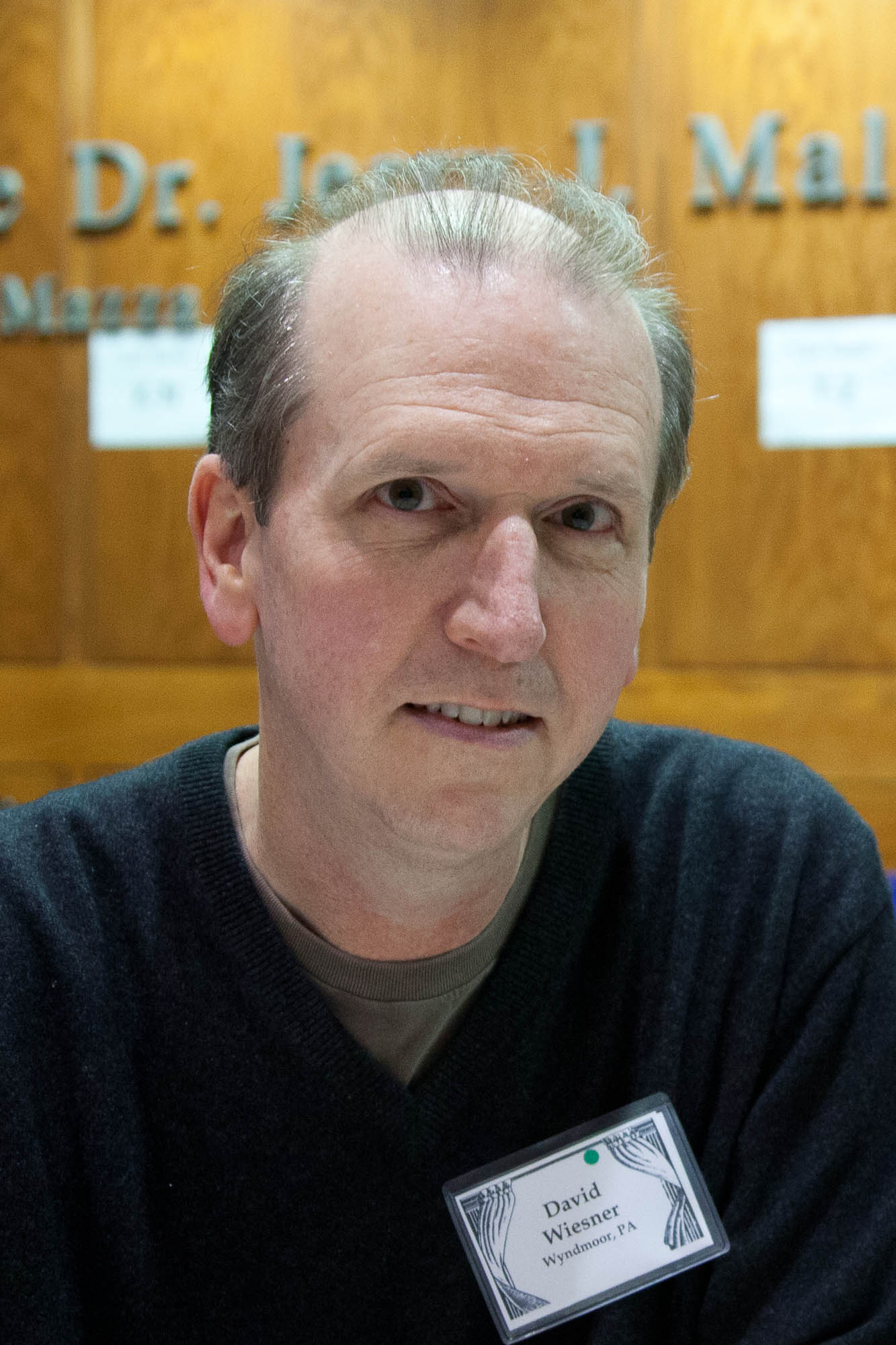
David Wiesner is one of only two illustrators, along with Marcia Brown, to have won three Caldecott Medals.

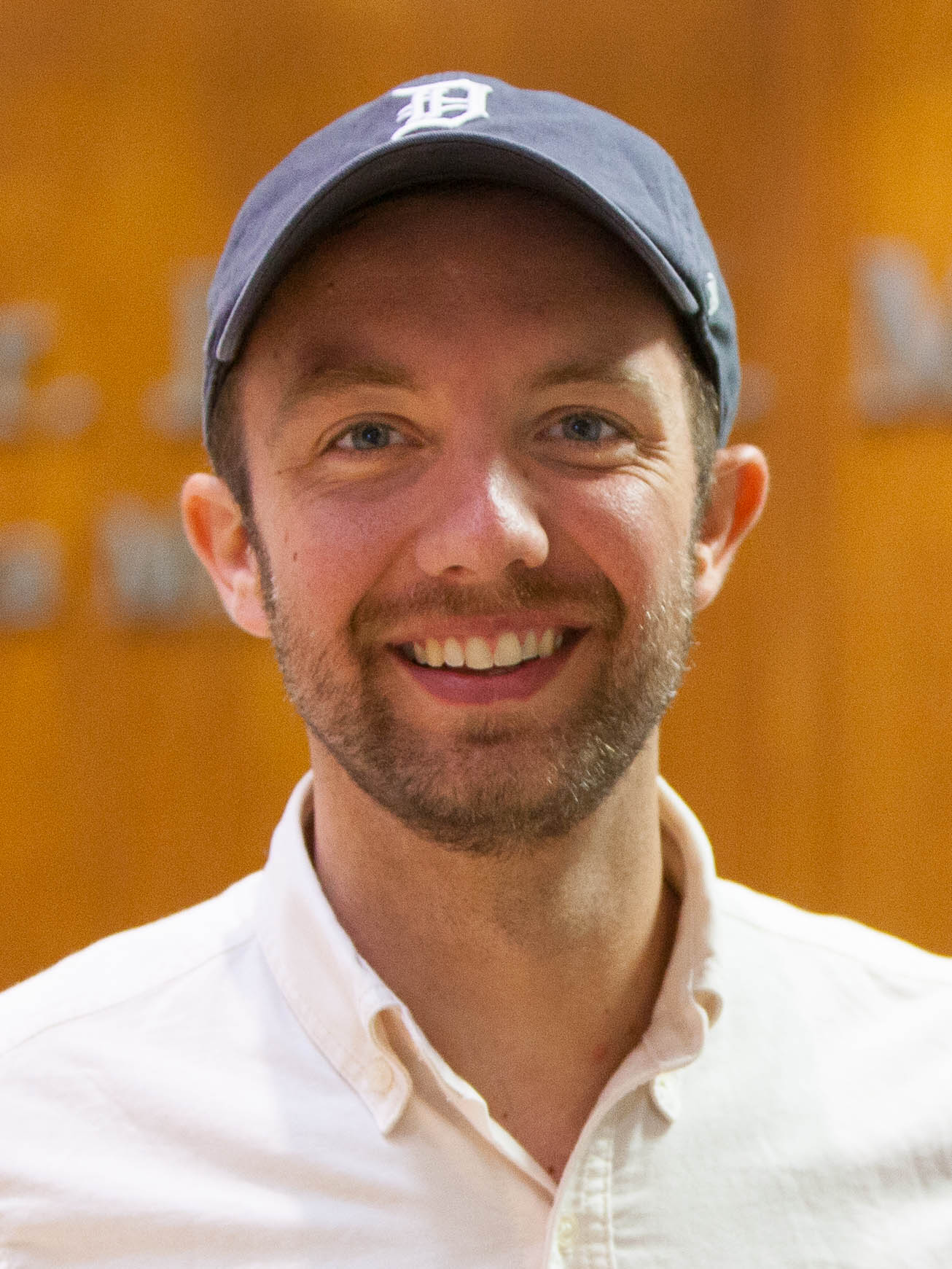
Jon Klassen is the second Caldecott medal recipient to also have a Caldecott honor book in the same year.

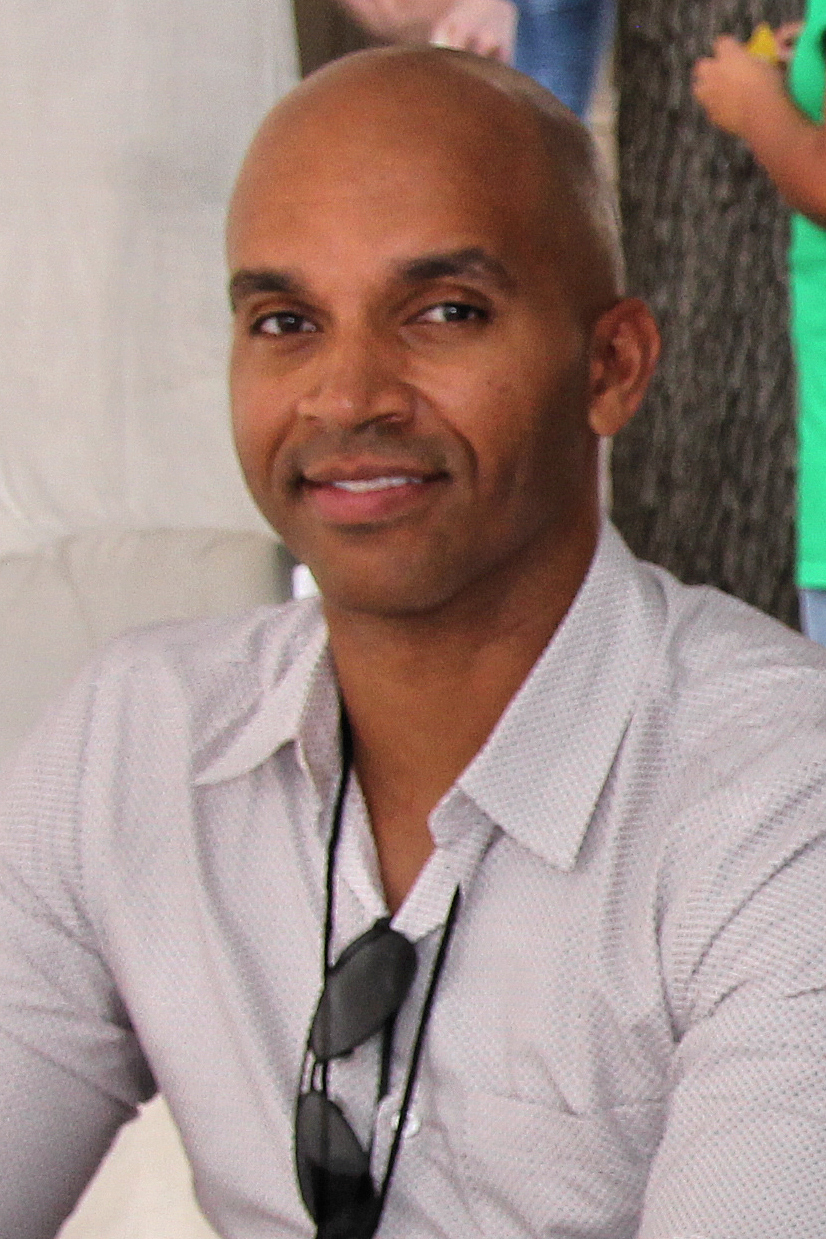
Kadir Nelson's artwork has been acquired by museums including the Smithsonian.

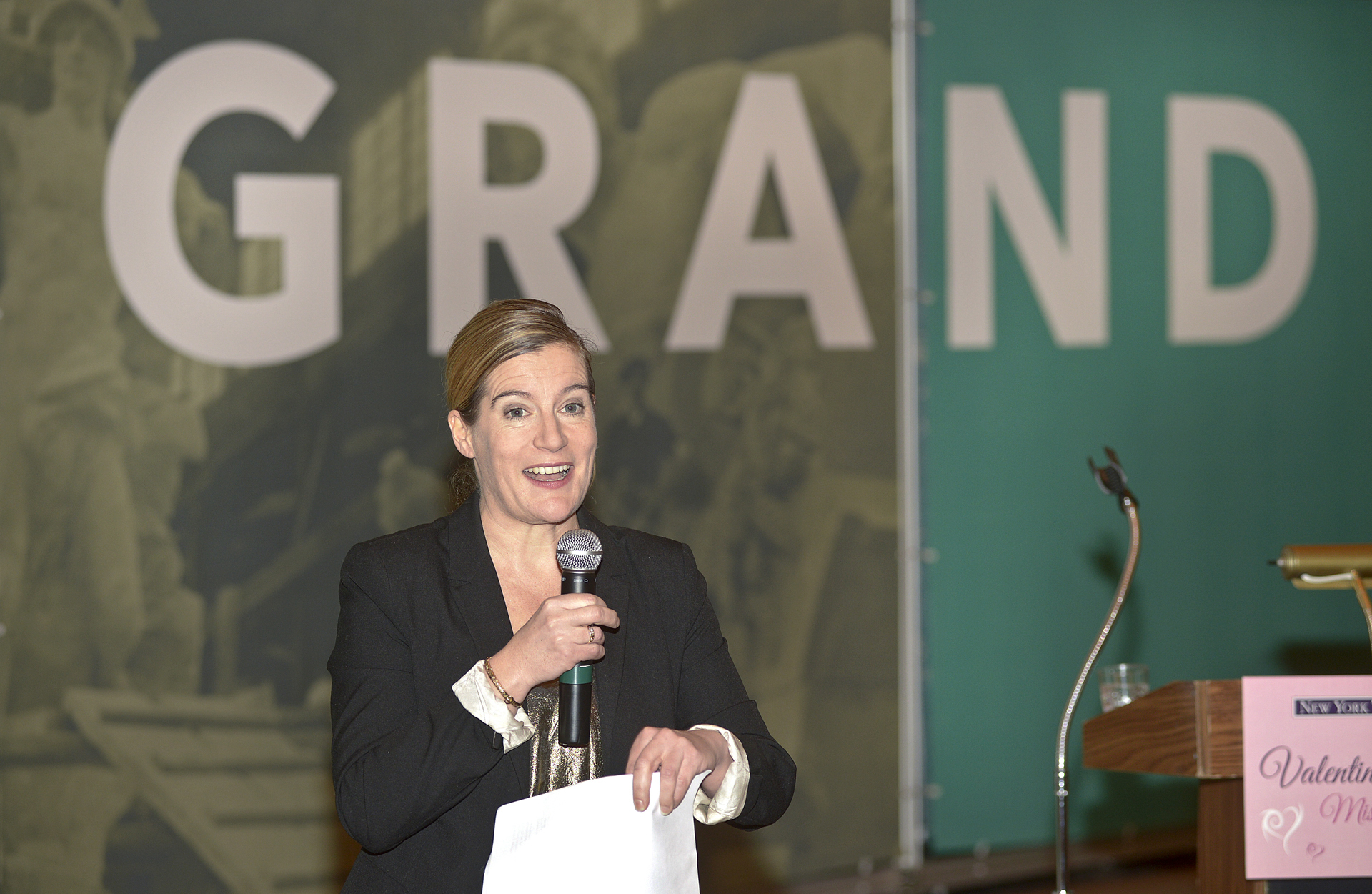
Sophie Blackall is the most recent multiple Caldecott Medal winner.

Listed below are all illustrators who have won at least two Caldecott Medals or who have won a medal and multiple honors.

Illustrator	Number of total awards	Number of Caldecott Medals	Caldecott Medals	Number of Caldecott Honors	Caldecott Honors
Marcia Brown	9	3	1955, 1962, 1983	6	1948, 1950, 1951, 1952, 1953, 1954
Maurice Sendak	8	1	1964	7	1954, 1959, 1960, 1962, 1963, 1971, 1982
Marie Hall Ets	6	1	1960	5	1945, 1952, 1956, 1957, 1966
Jerry Pinkney	6	1	2010	5	1989, 1990, 1995, 2000, 2003
David Wiesner	6	3	1992, 2002, 2007	3	1989, 2000, 2014
Robert McCloskey	5	2	1942, 1958	3	1949, 1953, 1954
Trina Schart Hyman	4	1	1985	3	1984, 1990, 2000
Blair Lent	4	1	1973	3	1965, 1969, 1971
Evaline Ness	4	1	1967	3	1964, 1965, 1966
Uri Shulevitz	4	1	1969	3	1980, 1999, 2009
Paul O. Zelinsky	4	1	1998	3	1985, 1987, 1995
Stephen Gammell	3	1	1989	2	1982, 1986
Jon Klassen	3	1	2013	2	2013, 2015
Robert Lawson	3	1	1941	2	1938, 1939
Nonny Hogrogian	3	2	1966, 1972	1	1977
Berta and Elmer Hader	3	1	1949	2	1940, 1944
Kevin Henkes	3	1	2005	2	1994, 2016
Arnold Lobel	3	1	1981	2	1971, 1972
David Macaulay	3	1	1991	2	1974, 1978
Gerald McDermott	3	1	1975	2	1973, 1994
Kadir Nelson	3	1	2020	2	2007, 2008
Leo Politi	3	1	1950	2	1947, 1949
Chris Raschka	3	2	2006, 2012	1	1994
Marc Simont	3	1	1957	2	1950, 2002
David Small	3	1	2001	2	1998, 2013
Chris Van Allsburg	3	2	1982, 1986	1	1980
Leonard Weisgard	3	1	1947	2	1946, 1947
Ed Young	3	1	1990	2	1968, 1993
Margot Zemach	3	1	1974	2	1970, 1978
Sophie Blackall	2	2	2016, 2019		
Barbara Cooney	2	2	1959, 1980		
Leo and Diane Dillon	2	2	1976, 1977		

== See also ==
- Kate Greenaway Medal, for illustration of a British children's book
- Theodor Seuss Geisel Award, for an American book for beginning readers
