= In My Mother's House =

1941 Picture book

- Author: Ann Nolan Clark
- Illustrator: Velino Herrera
- Publisher: Puffin Books/Penguin Random House
- Publication date: 1941
- Pages: unpaged
- Awards: Caldecott Honor

In My Mother's House is a 1941 picture book by Ann Nolan Clark and illustrated by Velino Herrera. A Tewa character presents his life. The book was a recipient of a 1942 Caldecott Honor for its illustrations.
