= Cock-a-Doodle Doo =

1939 Picture book

- Author: Berta and Elmer Hader
- Publisher: Macmillan
- Publication date: 1939
- Pages: unpaged
- Awards: Caldecott Honor

Cock-a-Doodle Doo is a 1939 picture book by Berta and Elmer Hader. The story is about a rooster who has been raised by ducks and decides to try and find others like him. The book was a recipient of a 1940 Caldecott Honor for its illustrations.
