= Double Bass Blues =

2019 picture book

- Author: Andrea J. Loney
- Illustrator: Rudy Guiterrez
- Publisher: Little, Brown, and Company
- Publication date: October 22, 2019
- Pages: unpaged
- Awards: Caldecott Honor
- ISBN: 9780316464451

Double Bass Blues is a 2019 picture book by Andrea J. Loney and illustrated by Rudy Gutierrez. The book was generally well-reviewed, and received a 2020 Caldecott Honor.

== Background and publication ==
The book was published on October 22, 2019.

== Plot ==
A young musician's journey home is accompanied by numerous sound effects.

== Illustrations ==
Nicholl Montgomery wrote that it's through the illustrations that we understand Nic's point of view.

== Awards and reception ==
The book was well reviewed. It received starred reviews from Publishers Weekly The Horn Book Magazine, and Kirkus Reviews

The book received a 2020 Caldecott Honor.
