= Susan Jeffers (illustrator) =

American children's book illustrator

Susan Jeffers (October 7, 1942 – January 28, 2020) was an American children's book illustrator. A New Jersey-born 1964 graduate of Pratt Institute, her first commercial success came in 1974, when she was honoree (runner-up) of the Caldecott Medal for illustrating Three Jovial Huntsmen, her own adaptation of a Mother Goose rhyme which had previously been illustrated by the eponymous Randolph Caldecott. Many of Jeffers' illustrations were of animals, especially horses. Some of her publications married her original illustrations to a previously published text used verbatim or adapted, sometimes by Jeffers herself. Otherwise, she frequently collaborated with writer and illustrator Rosemary Wells, who said each tried "to compensate for the other’s weaknesses and to amplify the other’s strength". In 1989, Jeffers' paintings in Wells' Forest of Dreams won the Golden Kite Award's Picture Book Illustration category.
