= The Red Book (children's book) =

2004 picture book

- Author: Barbara Lehman
- Illustrator: Barbara Lehman
- Language: English
- Genre: Children's picture book
- Publisher: Houghton Mifflin
- Publication date: 2004
- Publication place: United States
- Followed by: Red Again (2017)

The Red Book is a wordless picture book written and illustrated by Barbara Lehman. The book was published in 2004 by Houghton Mifflin, and received a 2005 Caldecott Honor.

In The Red Book, a girl in the city discovers a book about a boy on the beach. Meanwhile, a boy on the beach finds a book about the girl in the city. The two children read together, and the red book writes itself. In the story, the characters parachute to and from the two narrative frameworks.

The Red Book was the first book by Barbara Lehman, a children's book author based in Albany, New York, who has since become known for her mind-bending adventures through space and time. Her style has been compared to David Wiesner. The New Yorker called Lehman one of "the greatest practitioners" of the wordless picture book, and noted her ability to depict surprisingly advanced concepts without verbal assistance. According to The New Yorker, the book is "perhaps the only Caldecott winner to share DNA with the music video for a-ha's 'Take On Me'".

When Lehman was alerted that the book had been awarded a Caldecott Honor, the early morning phone call woke her up. She said: "It was absolutely as exciting as one would imagine, and also truly hard to take in as real, even over time. I must say that it did give me more confidence, as well as being a literal dream come true." Lehman published a sequel, Red Again, in 2017. Publishers Weekly wrote: "Together, the two volumes form a pleasing and perplexing Möbius strip of a story."
