= Dash and Dart =

1942 Picture book

- Author: Mary and Conrad Buff
- Publisher: Viking Press
- Publication date: 1942
- Pages: unpaged
- Awards: Caldecott Honor

Dash and Dart is a 1942 picture book by Mary and Conrad Buff. The story, told through prose and poetry, is about two deer. The book was a recipient of a 1943 Caldecott Honor for its illustrations.
