= The Mighty Hunter =

1943 Picture book

- First edition
- Author: Berta and Elmer Hader
- Publisher: Macmillan Company
- Publication date: 1942
- Pages: unpaged
- Awards: Caldecott Honor

The Mighty Hunter is a 1943 picture book by Berta and Elmer Hader. The story is about a Native American boy who wants to go hunting. The book was a recipient of a 1944 Caldecott Honor for its illustrations.
