= Dick Whittington and His Cat (book) =

1950 Caldecott picture book

- First edition
- Author: Marcia Brown
- Publisher: Charles Scribner's Sons
- Publication date: 1950
- Pages: unpaged
- Awards: Caldecott Honor

Dick Whittington and His Cat is a 1950 picture book written and illustrated by Marcia Brown. The book is a retelling of the English folktale of the same name. The book was a recipient of a 1951 Caldecott Honor for its illustrations.
