= Molly Idle =

American children's book illustrator

Molly Schaar Idle is an American children's book illustrator, author and animator. In 2014, she was awarded a Caldecott Honor for her picture book Flora and the Flamingo.

== Life and career ==
Molly Idle was born in Los Angeles, California and moved with her family to Tempe, Arizona when she was six years old. She graduated with a Bachelor of Fine Arts from Arizona State University. After college, she began her career as an animator for DreamWorks, working as an inbetweener and breakdown artist for five years. She worked on the films The Road to El Dorado, Spirit: Stallion of the Cimarron and Sinbad: Legend of the Seven Seas. She also was an animation artist for PBS Kids. She left DreamWorks after the studio transitioned to computer animation.

Idle's illustrated book, Emma's Gift, was published in 2003. Between 2004 and 2007, her self-illustrated books were published as part of the In God We Trust series of fiction.

Idle began a wordless picture book series, starting with the publishing of her book Flora and the Flamingo in 2013. The book received a Caldecott Honor in 2014.

Her drawing technique uses a layering of color pencil drawings.

== Selected works ==
- Zombelina (2013), illustrator
- Rodeo Red (2015), illustrator; written by Maripat Perkins
- Coral (2020)

=== Flora series ===
- Flora and the Flamingo (2013)
- Flora and the Penguin (2014)
- Flora and the Peacocks (2016)
- Flora and the Ostrich: An Opposites Book (2017)
- Flora and the Chicks: A Counting Book (2017)

=== Rex series ===
- Tea Rex (2013)
- Camp Rex (2014)
- Sea Rex (2015)
- Santa Rex (2017)
- Pearl (2018)
