= Pierre Pidgeon =

1943 Picture book

- First edition
- Author: Lee Kingman
- Illustrator: Arnold E. Bare
- Publisher: Houghton Mifflin Company
- Publication date: 1943
- Pages: unpaged
- Awards: Caldecott Honor

Pierre Pidgeon is a 1943 picture book by Lee Kingman, with illustrations by Arnold E. Bare. The story is about the title character who has to place a model ship in a new bottle. The book was a recipient of a 1944 Caldecott Honor for its illustrations.
