= T-Bone, the Baby Sitter =

1950 Caldecott picture book

- First edition
- Author: Clare Turlay Newberry
- Publisher: Harper
- Publication date: 1950
- Pages: unpaged
- Awards: Caldecott Honor

T-Bone, the Baby Sitter is a 1950 picture book written and illustrated by Clare Turlay Newberry. The book is about a mischievous cat. The book was a recipient of a 1951 Caldecott Honor for its illustrations.
