= Timothy Turtle =

1946 picture book by Al Graham

- First edition
- Author: Al Graham
- Illustrator: Tony Palazzo
- Publisher: Welch Publishers
- Publication date: 1946
- Pages: Unpaged
- Awards: Caldecott Honor

Timothy Turtle is a 1946 picture book written by Al Graham and illustrated by Tony Palazzo. Timothy Turtle needs help from his friends after he gets flipped onto his shell. The book was a recipient of a 1947 Caldecott Honor for its illustrations.
