= Mr. Penny's Race Horse =

1957 Caldecott picture book

- Author: Marie Hall Ets
- Publisher: Viking
- Publication date: 1956
- Pages: unpaged
- Awards: Caldecott Honor

Mr. Penny's Race Horse is a 1956 picture book written and illustrated by Marie Hall Ets. The book tells the story of a farmer, Mr. Penny, and his animals who wish to win first place prizes at a fair. The book was a recipient of a 1957 Caldecott Honor for its illustrations.
