= What Do You Say, Dear? =

1958 Caldecott picture book

- Author: Sesyle Joslin
- Illustrator: Maurice Sendak
- Publisher: W.R. Scott
- Publication date: 1958
- Pages: unpaged
- Awards: Caldecott Honor

What Do You Say, Dear? is a 1958 children's picture book written by Sesyle Joslin and illustrated by Maurice Sendak. The book offers a humorous lesson on manners. What Do You Say, Dear? was awarded a 1959 Caldecott Honor for its illustrations.

The picture book presents a series of unusual, humorous scenarios, such as "you are walking backwards, because sometimes you like to, and you bump into a crocodile." The titular line, "What do you say, dear?" appears after each scenario. Upon turning the page, readers see a polite phrase that fits the situation, like "Excuse me!".
