= America's Ethan Allen =

1950 Caldecott picture book

- First edition
- Author: Stewart Holbrook
- Illustrator: Lynd Ward
- Publisher: Houghton Mifflin Harcourt
- Publication date: 1949
- Pages: unpaged
- Awards: Caldecott Honor

America's Ethan Allen is a 1949 picture book biography written by Stewart Holbrook and illustrated by Lynd Ward. The book is a biography of Ethan Allen. The book was a recipient of a 1949 Caldecott Honor for its illustrations.
