= Small Rain: Verses From The Bible =

1943 Picture book

- First edition
- Author: James Orton Jones
- Illustrator: Elizabeth Orton Jones
- Publisher: Viking Press
- Publication date: November 1943
- Pages: Unpaged
- Awards: Caldecott Medal

Small Rain: Verses From The Bible is a 1943 picture book based on the King James Bible, revised by James Orton Jones and illustrated by Elizabeth Orton Jones, who won the 1944 Caldecott Medal.
