= The Most Wonderful Doll in the World =

1950 Caldecott picture book

- First edition
- Author: Phyllis McGinley
- Illustrator: Helen Stone
- Publisher: Lippincott
- Publication date: 1950
- Pages: unpaged
- Awards: Caldecott Honor

The Most Wonderful Doll in the World is a 1950 picture book written by Phyllis McGinley and illustrated by Helen Stone. The book is a girl describing to her father the best qualities of a missing doll. The book was a recipient of a 1951 Caldecott Honor for its illustrations.
