= Play With Me (children's book) =

1956 Caldecott picture book

- Author: Marie Hall Ets
- Publisher: Viking
- Publication date: 1955
- Pages: unpaged
- Awards: Caldecott Honor

Play with Me is a 1955 picture book written and illustrated by Marie Hall Ets. The book tells the story of a girl who attempts to play in a meadow with animals. The book was a recipient of a 1956 Caldecott Honor for its illustrations.
