= Ilse Plume =

Ilse Plume is an illustrator of children's books. Her first book, The Bremen Town Musicians, was a Caldecott Honor book for 1981. She is also a teacher of Children's Book Illustration at the School of the Museum of Fine Arts, Boston and Massachusetts College of Art and Design in Boston, Massachusetts.
