= Mr. T. W. Anthony Woo =

1952 Caldecott picture book

- Author: Marie Hall Ets
- Publisher: Viking
- Publication date: 1951
- Pages: unpaged
- Awards: Caldecott Honor

Mr. T. W. Anthony Woo is a 1951 picture book written and illustrated by Marie Hall Ets. Normally enemies a cat, dog, and mouse team-up to rid their house of a woman and her parrot. The book was a recipient of a 1952 Caldecott Honor for its illustrations.
