= Outside In (book) =

2020 picture book

- Author: Deborah Underwood
- Illustrator: Cindy Derby
- Language: English
- Awards: Caldecott Honor
- ISBN: 9780358330110
- OCLC: 1150884524

Outside In is a 2020 picture book written by Deborah Underwood and illustrated by Cindy Derby. The book won a 2021 Caldecott Honor. The book is about the impact of nature.
