= Red Sings from Treetops =

Book by Joyce Sidman

Red Sings from Treetops: A Year in Colors
- Cover of Red Sings from Treetops: A Year in Colors
- Author: Joyce Sidman
- Illustrator: Pamela Zagarenski
- Language: English
- Genre: Children's Literature, Poetry
- Published: 2009 Houghton Mifflin Books for Children/Houghton Mifflin Harcourt
- Media type: Print (Picture Book)
- Pages: 32

Red Sings from Treetops: A Year in Colors is a children's picture book written by American children's author Joyce Sidman, illustrated by Pamela Zagarenski, and published by Houghton Mifflin Books for Children. The book, published in 2009, follows the changes of the seasons throughout the year by looking at colors. The book was an Honor book for the Caldecott Medal and won the Claudia Lewis Poetry Award in 2010. Other awards and honors Red Sings from Treetops has earned include the Minnesota Book Award, Cybils Poetry Award, the Bulletin Blue Ribbon and Booklist Editor's Choice.

== Concept and development ==
The idea for Red Sings from Treetops came to Sidman on her daily walks through the woods where she would see color everywhere throughout all seasons. In an interview after winning the Minnesota Book Award, she stated that she had "always wanted to write a book about color", but wanted it to be different from the many books that already explored the topic. It took several years to develop a structure for the text that worked well with the content and showed how she felt about color and nature while still being different from other children's books. In the previously mentioned interview, Sidman stated that what she finally settled on in terms of structure was "a way of personifying the colors, of making them come alive and describing them as if they were alive".

== Synopsis ==
The book, which Sidman describes as a "thread that starts in spring and celebrates the colors through the seasons", is divided into four sections with the headings Spring, Summer, Fall, and Winter. In each section, Sidman provides a poetic description of the titular season, using colors to display what occurs at each point in the year, such as leaves budding in the spring being "Shy. / Green peeks from buds, / trembles in the breeze.". Most pages are dedicated to one or two colors, and the poetry is accompanied by images provided by Zagarenski. Almost all of the images follow a person and their dog participating in seasonal activities, both of whom are typically wearing a paper crown and are otherwise dressed for the weather.
