= The Boats on the River =

1946 Picture book

- First edition
- Author: Marjorie Flack
- Illustrator: Jay Hyde Barnum
- Publisher: Viking Press, an imprint of Penguin Random House
- Publication date: 1946
- Pages: unpaged
- Awards: Caldecott Honor

Boats on the River is a 1946 picture book by Marjorie Flack and illustrated by Jay Hyde Barnum. The story is about the various boats that are on the river in a city. The book was a recipient of a 1947 Caldecott Honor for its illustrations.
