= Me... Jane =

2011 children's book by Patrick McDonnell

- Author: Patrick McDonnell
- Language: English
- Genre: Biography, children's book
- Published: 2011
- Publisher: Little, Brown and Company
- Publication place: United States
- ISBN: 978-0-316-04546-9

Me... Jane is a 2011 children's picture book written and illustrated by Patrick McDonnell. The book tells the story of a young Jane Goodall and her toy chimpanzee, Jubilee, as they explore the world. The book was a recipient of a 2012 Caldecott Honor for its illustrations. In 2014, an animated adaptation, narrated by Katherine Kellgren and animated by Paul and Sandra Fierlinger, was released by Weston Woods. In 2015, it won the Carnegie Medal for Excellence in Children's Video.
