= Sleep Like a Tiger =

2012 picture book by Mary Logue

- Author: Mary Logue
- Illustrator: Pamela Zagarenski
- Language: English
- Genre: Picture book
- Publisher: HMH Books for Young Readers
- Publication date: October 23, 2012
- Publication place: United States
- Media type: Print
- Pages: 40 pp
- ISBN: 0547641028

Sleep Like a Tiger, written by Mary Logue and illustrated by Pamela Zagarenski, is a picture book published by HMH Books for Young Readers in 2012. Sleep Like a Tiger was a Caldecott Medal Honor Book in 2013.

Other works of Zagarenski are Red Sings from Treetops: A Year in Colors, which was also a Caldecott Medal Honor Book in 2010, and This Is Just to Say: Poems of Apology and Forgiveness, a 2008 Lee Bennett Hopkins Poetry Award Honor Book.

== Plot and description ==
Sleep Like a Tiger tells the story of a very awake little girl who asks her parents if everything sleeps. The illustrations by Zagarenski show a family surrounded by images of crowns and ornate patterns while the parents coax the little girl to bed.

Even though the girl repeats that she is not tired, her parents require the girl to at least put on pajamas and prepare for bed. The girl eventually lies in bed, and her parents tell her about the sleep habits of various animals, including the family dog and cat, bats, snails, bears, whales, and tigers. Eventually her parents wish her goodnight, and say that she should stay in bed but does not have to sleep. In the end, the girl is seen sleeping.

Sleep Like a Tiger is a picture book of 40 pages. Most of the text is found at the beginning of the book, allowing children to become drowsy as the story continues. The parents practice the psychological art of paradoxical intention, letting the girl naturally relax in bed knowing that sleep will come instead of forcing her to sleep.

== Critical reception ==
Sleep Like a Tiger was published to very strong reviews. Kirkus Reviews praised Zagarenski's illustrations for their use of different textures, busy lines, and tiny details. Zagarenski frequently hides objects in the illustrations, providing entertainment for observant readers. The illustrations are a combination of digital art and mixed media on wood. According to The Washington Post, Zagarenski's soft-toned dreamscapes of moons and stars and toys match the book's mood and lyrical text.

== See also ==
- Children's literature
- Caldecott Medal
