= Wheel on the Chimney =

1955 Caldecott picture book

- Author: Margaret Wise Brown
- Illustrator: Tibor Gergely
- Publisher: Lippincott
- Publication date: 1954
- Pages: unpaged
- Awards: Caldecott Honor

Wheel on the Chimney is a 1954 children's picture book written by Margaret Wise Brown and illustrated by Tibor Gergely. The book tells the story of a pair of migrating storks building a new nest. The book was a recipient of a 1955 Caldecott Honor for its illustrations.
