= Bambino the Clown =

1947 Picture book

- First edition
- Author: Georges Schreiber
- Publisher: Viking Press
- Publication date: 1947
- Pages: unpaged
- Awards: Caldecott Honor

Bambino the Clown is a 1947 picture book by Georges Schreiber. The story is about an Italian clown who entertains children. The book was a recipient of a 1948 Caldecott Honor for its illustrations.
