= They All Saw a Cat =

2016 picture book

- Author: Brendan Wenzel
- Publisher: Chronicle Books
- Publication date: August 30, 2016
- Pages: unpaged
- Awards: Caldecott Honor
- ISBN: 978-1-45215-013-0

They All Saw a Cat is a 2016 picture book written and illustrated by Brendan Wenzel. Winner of a 2017 Caldecott Honor, They All Saw a Cat explores what a cat might look like from the perspectives of various animals' points of view. They All Saw a Cat received a starred review from Publishers Weekly in July 2016. An animated film of the book was released in 2017 by Weston Woods, narrated by John Lithgow with music by David Mansfield. The film concludes with an interview with Wenzel.

The title has been recognized as one of the best picture books published in 2016. It first appeared in the list published by Meghan Cox Gurdon for The Wall Street Journal. Later it was also mentioned in Slate's piece written by Dan Kois and Rebecca Onion.
