= Ape in a Cape: An Alphabet of Odd Animals =

1953 Caldecott picture book

- Author: Fritz Eichenberg
- Illustrator: Fritz Eichenberg
- Language: English
- Genre: Children's book, picture book, alphabet, animals
- Publisher: Harcourt
- Publication date: 1952
- Publication place: United States
- Pages: unpaged
- Awards: Caldecott Honor

Ape in a Cape: An Alphabet of Odd Animals is a 1952 children's picture book written and illustrated by Fritz Eichenberg. The book is a rhyming alphabet book. The book was a recipient of a 1953 Caldecott Honor for its illustrations.
