= A Child's Good Night Book =

1943 Picture book

- First edition
- Author: Margaret Wise Brown
- Illustrator: Jean Charlot
- Publisher: Addison-Wesley
- Publication date: 1943
- Pages: unpaged
- Awards: Caldecott Honor

A Child's Good Night Book is a 1943 picture book by Margaret Wise Brown and illustrated by Jean Charlot. Children and animals settle down for the night. The book was a recipient of a 1944 Caldecott Honor for its illustrations.
