= The House That Jack Built: La Maison Que Jacques A Batie =

1958 Caldecott picture book

- Author: Antonio Frasconi
- Publisher: Harcourt
- Publication date: 1958
- Pages: unpaged
- Awards: Caldecott Honor

The House That Jack Built: La Maison Que Jacques A Batie is a 1958 picture book written and illustrated by Antonio Frasconi. The book tells the story of the nursery rhyme "This Is the House That Jack Built" in English and French. The book was a recipient of a 1959 Caldecott Honor for its illustrations.
