= Marvin Bileck =

American artist

Marvin Bileck (March 2, 1920 – April 29, 2005) was an artist and teacher in the United States. He illustrated children's books.

Bileck was born in Passaic, New Jersey. He graduated from Cooper Union and received a Fulbright Grant to study in France. His work was included in shows at the Metropolitan Museum of Art and the Chicago Institute of Art.

He was married to artist Emily Nelligan (1924–2018). They summered on Cranberry Island and did art works at it. In 2014 his and his wife's artwork was exhibited.

Bowdoin College has a Marvin Bileck Printmaking Projects that brings printmakers to the college as educators.

== Illustrator ==
- My Teddy Bear Sings Out Loud
- Rain Makes Applesauce
- My House Goes Walking Every Day
- Monkeys Mumble in a Jelly Bean Jungle
- I Wear My Shoes Inside Out
- By Trolley Past Thimbledon Bridge
