= Miriam Schlein =

American writer

Miriam Schlein (June 6, 1926 – November 23, 2004) was an American author who wrote nearly 100 books (in 5 decades) that helped teach children about animals and more obscure ideas such as space and time. Her books include Discovering Dinosaur Babies (1991), The Dino Quiz Book (1995), and Before the Dinosaurs (1996).

Schlein died of vasculitis in Manhattan, New York, at age 78, in 2004. The Beinecke Rare Book and Manuscript Library of Yale University contains a collection of her writings, research material, correspondence, clippings, photographs, and slides.

== Partial works ==
- When Will the World Be Mine? (1953)
- The Bumblebee's Secret (1958)
- Amuny, Boy of Old Egypt (1961) - Abelard-Schuman
- Who? (1963) - Henry Z. Walck, Inc.
- The Way Mothers Are (1963)
- The Snake in the Carpool (1963)
- What's Wrong With Being a Skunk? (1974)
- I, Tut: The Boy Who Became Pharaoh (1979)
- Lucky Porcupine (1980)
- The Year of the Panda (1990)
- Discovering Dinosaur Babies (1991)
- I Sailed with Columbus (1991)
- The Dino Quiz Book (1995)
- The Puzzle of the Dinosaur-Bird: The Story of Archaeopteryx (1996)
- What the Dinosaurs Saw (1998)
- Hello, Hello! (2002)
- Little Raccoon's Big Question (2004)
