= An American ABC =

1941 Picture book

- Author: Maud and Miska Petersham
- Publisher: Macmillan
- Publication date: 1941
- Pages: unpaged
- Awards: Caldecott Honor

An American ABC is a 1941 picture book by Maud and Miska Petersham. It is an ABC book of Americana. The book was a recipient of a 1942 Caldecott Honor for its illustrations.
