= Marjorie Torrey =

American illustrator and writer (1888/91–1964)

Marjorie Torrey Chanslor (née Hood; November 10, 1888/1891 – September 1, 1964) was an American illustrator and writer of children's books. She also wrote two mystery novels for adults under the name Torrey Chanslor and published under the name Torrey Bevans. She was a runner-up for the annual American Library Association Caldecott Medal for children's picture book illustration, in both 1946 and 1947; Opal Wheeler wrote both books, Sing Mother Goose and Sing in Praise).

== Personal life ==
Chanslor was born Marjorie Torrey Hood in Brooklyn, New York to William A. Hood (1860–1918) and Caroline Lincoln Torrey (1861–1949). The year of birth has been disputed with the years 1888 and 1891 being preferred. The writer herself would give her year of birth as 1899, which has been discredited, particularly in light of her 1911 marriage to Thomas Murray Bevans (1879–1953) in Jersey City, New Jersey. He had previously been married to Anna Fessenden Bradley (1877–1920) from around 1899 to around 1905; they had a son, Thomas Torre Bevans (1912–2003),) who renewed copyright to several of Torrey's books in the 1970s. Thomas Torre Bevans was married to Margaret Van Doren, also a writer and illustrator.

She married, secondly, to screenwriter Roy Edwin Chanslor (1899–1964), who wrote The Menace. In April 1935, she was fined $1,450 (equivalent to $34,000 in 2025) for throwing a cocktail at screenwriter Lon Young at a New Year's Eve party at the Cafe Trocadero nightclub in Los Angeles.

Marjorie Torrey Chanslor died on September 1, 1964, in Manhattan. There was no funeral service, at her direction.

== Books ==
- Sarah's idea (1938), illustrator
- Our First Murder (Frederick A. Stokes, 1940) – mystery fiction for adults, featuring the Beagle Sisters, LCCN 40-13519
- Our Second Murder (Stokes, 1941), LCCN 41-3902
- Penny (1944)
- Artie and the Princess (1945)
- Three Little Chipmunks (1947)
- The Merriweathers (1949)
- New star of the show (1949), illustrator
- Alice in Wonderland (1955), illustrator
- Far from Marlborough Street
- Trouble for Jerry Doris Gages, illustrator
- Saturday Night is My Delight
- Sing Mother Goose, written by Opal Wheeler (E. P. Dutton, 1945)
- Sing in Praise: a collection of the best loved hymns, by Opal Wheeler (Dutton, 1946)
- Abide with Me, illustrator
- Hoodoo that Voodoo, illustrator
- Songs to sing with the very young, by Phyllis Brown Ohanian (1966)
- Peter Pan (Random House, Inc. 1957), illustrator, LCCN 57-7525
