= Leonard Weisgard =

American writer

- Born: Leonard Joseph Weisgard; December 12, 1916; New Haven, Connecticut, US
- Died: January 14, 2000 (aged 83); Denmark
- Education: Pratt Institute
- Known for: Children's picture book illustration
- Notable work: Collaborations with Margaret Wise Brown
- Spouse: Phyllis Monnot
- Awards: Caldecott Medal Caldecott Honor; 1947

Leonard Joseph Weisgard (December 13, 1916 – January 14, 2000) was an American writer and illustrator of more than 200 children's books. He is known best for his collaborations with writer Margaret Wise Brown.

== Biography ==
Weisgard was born in New Haven, Connecticut, and spent most of his childhood in England. He studied art at the Pratt Institute in New York City.

His first book, Suki the Siamese Pussy, was published in 1937, and his first collaboration with Brown was two years later, The Noisy Book. He won the 1948 Caldecott Medal for U.S. picture book illustration, recognizing The Little Island, written by Brown. They collaborated again on The Important Book, published by Harper & Brothers in 1949. Altogether, Weisgard illustrated at least 14 of Brown's books, including two that were published posthumously. (Brown wrote the text for six books that were published as by "Golden MacDonald". All were unpaged picture books illustrated by Weisgard and published by Doubleday.)

The same year, Weisgard received the Caldecott Honor for his illustrations in the book “Rain Drop Splash” authored by Alvin Tresselt. He was the first to be awarded the Caldecott Medal and the Caldecott Honor in the same year.

Writer Marjorie Kinnan Rawlings was a Newbery Medal runner-up in 1956 for The Secret River, which Weisgard illustrated. He also illustrated Alice Dalgliesh's The Courage of Sarah Noble, a 1955 Newbery Medal runner-up.

Weisgard married Phyllis Monnot in 1951 and moved to Copenhagen, Denmark, with her and their three children in 1969. He died on January 14, 2000, in Denmark.
