= Alice Dalgliesh =

American writer

- Born: Alice Dalgliesh; October 7, 1893; Trinidad, British West Indies
- Died: June 11, 1979; Woodbury, Connecticut, United States
- Citizenship: American (naturalized)
- Occupations: Writer, publisher
- Writing career
- Notable works: The Courage of Sarah Noble; The Bears on Hemlock Mountain; The Silver Pencil
- Notable awards: Newbery Medal runner-up 1945, 1953, 1955

Alice Dalgliesh (October 7, 1893 – June 11, 1979) was a naturalized American writer and publisher who wrote more than 40 fiction and non-fiction books, mainly for children. She has been called "a pioneer in the field of children's historical fiction". Three of her books were runners-up for the annual Newbery Medal, the partly autobiographical The Silver Pencil, The Bears on Hemlock Mountain, and The Courage of Sarah Noble, which was also named to the Lewis Carroll Shelf Award list.

As the founding editor (in 1934) of Scribner's and Sons Children's Book Division, Dalgliesh published works by award-winning authors and illustrators including Robert A. Heinlein, Marcia Brown, Marjorie Kinnan Rawlings, Katherine Milhous, Will James, Leonard Weisgard, and Leo Politi. Her prominence in the field of children's literature led to her being appointed the first president of the Children's Book Council, a national nonprofit trade association of children's book publishers and presses.

== Biography ==
Born October 7, 1893, in Trinidad, British West Indies, to John and Alice (Haynes) Dalgliesh, Alice immigrated to England with her family when she was 13. Six years later she came to America to study kindergarten education at the Pratt Institute in New York City. She eventually received a Bachelor in Education and Master in English Literature from the Teachers College at Columbia University. While she was at school Dalgliesh applied for and received her naturalization as an American citizen. She taught for 17 years at the Horace Mann School, while also leading courses in children's literature and story writing at Columbia. Dalgliesh regularly wrote about children's books for Parent's Magazine (1929 to 1943), Publishers Weekly, School Library Journal, and The Saturday Review. She also contributed to The Horn Book Magazine, including the article "In Mr. Newbery's Bookshop", about John Newbery.

Dalgliesh worked with the textbook department at Charles Scribner and Sons editing social studies books. This led to an invitation to start a children's book publishing department at the firm in 1934. According to Charles Scribner, Jr., at that time "Scribner's employed no women except secretaries. When she came to my father and asked him to give her an office, he replied, 'Oh, do you really need one?'" Apparently he had expected her to begin and run the division out of her home. She held the position of children's book editor until 1960.

After her retirement from Scribner's, Dalgleish became the editor of "Books for Young Readers" by The Saturday Review of Literature. She reviewed books for that magazine from 1961 until 1966.

Alice Dalgliesh died June 11, 1979, in Woodbury, Connecticut. Her papers are held at the University of Minnesota, Vassar College Library, and the Princeton University Library.

== Writing ==
Dalgliesh began writing at the urging of Louise Seaman Bechtel, then a publisher at Macmillan, who published her second book, The Little Wooden Farmer in 1930. Seaman Bechtal continued to mentor Dalgliesh after she began working at Scribners.

The Silver Pencil, published by Scribners in 1944, was a runner-up for the annual (1945) American Library Association Newbery Medal, a Newbery Honor Book in modern terms. The title refers to a silver pencil given to Dalgleish by her father. The book is a thinly veiled partial-autobiography about Janet Laidlaw, born in Trinidad to a Scotch father and British mother, like Dalgliesh. Janet eventually comes to America and becomes a teacher and writer. The book, illustrated by Katherine Milhous, was called by Saturday Review, "a treasure to possess and to keep." Two years later Along Janet's Road, also illustrated by Milhous, continued the story.

Dalgliesh's next major book was The Bears on Hemlock Mountain. She said this simple picture book was based on an old Pennsylvania tall tale. Illustrated by Helen Sewell, it is another Newbery Honor Book.

Her third Newbery Honor Book came two years later, The Courage of Sarah Noble. The book opens with an Author's Note stating that it is a true story. Virginia Haviland, later the first director of the Library of Congress Children's Book Section, said of Sarah Noble, “Here is a remarkable book for younger readers — a true pioneer adventure, written for easy reading but without any sacrifice of literary quality or depth of feeling.”

Dalgliesh wrote over three dozen children's books, others for adults, and a great many articles and reviews of children's fiction. A number of her books were named Best Books of the Year by Horn Book Magazine. Her non-fiction was often noted by reviewers for its "casual yet factual and detailed style." Frequently her books capitalized on her interest in American history and were praised for their "accuracy and detail as well as her creation of believable characters and dramatic plots." Reviewer Rachel Fordyce pointed to her "strong sense of the child audience... and a delight in language, detail, situation, and action."

== Publishing ==
Under her leadership the Children's Department at Scribners published many distinguished authors and illustrators like N.C. Wyeth, Genevieve Foster and Alfred Morgan. She produced award-winning non-fiction, including several ground-breaking science and biography series. Her fiction sometimes pushed the boundaries, as in 1952's Two and the Town by Henry Felsen, in which a young girl becomes pregnant and the couple is then forced to marry.

Dalgliesh also developed juvenile science fiction, and was Robert A. Heinlein's editor for many of his books, from Red Planet, (1949), to Have Space Suit—Will Travel (1959). At one point she commented that she wished she had a girls' writer who could turn out a book a year, as Heinlein did for boys. Taking her idea to heart, he wrote the short story "Poor Daddy", with a teenage girl for the protagonist. One of Heinlein's juveniles that she edited eventually won a Retro-Hugo Award for Best Novel - Farmer in the Sky.

Francis Felsen, who worked under Dalgliesh as an editor, said she "knew clearly what she liked and didn't like and stood behind it”, but she also "let authors write in their own voice, had insights into writers, and a respect for history". Charles Scribner, Jr., came into the business while she was there, and said this of her: "She was a professional through and through. Indeed, she gave me my real education in publishing as a business, as a set of obligations, and as a career requiring the highest standards. She felt she had a calling to be a children's book editor and that her books had to be of the highest possible quality."

Once World War II ended, schools around the U.S. began a major push to increase their libraries. According to Scribner Jr. again, "Alice's list was aimed directly at this very profitable market. All the people involved -- the editors, the artists, the reviewers, the teachers, the school librarians -- shared a common resolve to give American youngsters the very best literature that could be got." Given the number of award-winning books she published, it appears the industry felt she was successful. Children's literature authority Leonard S. Marcus says in Minders of Make-Believe, "her department quietly captured the industry's respect and more than a few of its accolades." Besides the Hugo award, Dalgliesh published at least eleven Newbery Honor books, three Caldecott Medal books and ten Caldecott Honor books, (including her own). Dalgleish has been "credited with advancing the place of children's literature in the publishing world".

== Robert A. Heinlein ==
Robert Heinlein's correspondence (posthumously edited and published at his bequest by his wife Virginia Heinlein as Grumbles from the Grave) describes throughout two chapters of the book changes Dalgliesh requested to Heinlein's books for Scribners to which Heinlein objected strongly.

During the period in which Alice Dalgliesh edited Heinlein's juvenile books (as documented in Grumbles from the Grave), she requested what Heinlein considered very unreasonable revisions to several of his novels. Some of these revisions were grounded in Freudian psychological analysis of Heinlein's work which he felt were without literary merit and were poorly considered. At one point, Dalgliesh asked Heinlein to have (in her words) "a good Freudian" look at his novels to point out what she thought undesirable psychosexual imagery in his work for juveniles.

Finally, during Dalgleish's editing of Heinlein's The Rolling Stones, Heinlein analyzed Dalgliesh's own juvenile novel Along Janet's Way for psychosexual symbology in the same manner she analyzed his "Martian flat cats" - to show how (in his words) "it is impossible to write any story in such a way that it will not bring a knowing leer to the face of 'a good Freudian'."

There were also difficulties between Heinlein and Dalgliesh regarding Dalgliesh's successful insistence to have her personal views on gun control written into Tunnel in the Sky and Red Planet. Also, Dalgliesh objected to the hero of Tunnel in the Sky being African-American, suggesting the novel would be unpopular in the American South because of that.

Learned T. Bulman, a reviewer of The Star Beast for the librarians' magazine Library Journal wrote Dalgliesh that, unless Scribners recalled all copies of the book and revised it to remove things to which he objected, he would "lambast" it in that librarians' trade journal. Heinlein wrote to his agent to complain that Dalgliesh took the reviewer's side in her written reply to him, conceding the reviewer's complaints on every point.

Bulman's main complaint was that in The Star Beast, one of the juvenile characters was "flippant" to adult characters in the book. Heinlein told his agent that he expected a stronger defense of his books for Scribners from his editor than to cave in to criticism and threats over trivial matters. It was in this letter to his agent that Heinlein referred to his desire to take his books to another publishing house rather than deal with Alice Dalgliesh's requests for revisions of his work which were not related to their literary merits.

In January 1959 (by which time Heinlein had written a commercially successful series of juvenile novels while Dalgliesh was the juveniles editor at Scribners), not only Dalgliesh but the publishing house's entire editorial board flatly rejected his "young adult" novel Starship Troopers. Heinlein's correspondence with his agent shows this was the reason why he ceased to write for Scribners, taking Starship Troopers to George Putnam's Sons, where it was successfully published, winning the 1960 Hugo Award for Best Novel.

In a letter dated September 19, 1960, Heinlein refers to an approach made to him to resume writing for Scribners through Heinlein's agent Lurton Blassingame in which he refused to return to their stable of juvenile book authors even though "I do know that Alice Dalgliesh is no longer there".

Publishing highlights
| Date | Title | Author | Significance |
|---|---|---|---|
| 1936 | Horn's Farm on the Hill | Madeline Darrough | The only children's book illustrated by American artist Grant Wood. |
| 1938 | The Gay Mother Goose | With drawings by Françoise. | Rhymes for the book were selected by Alice Dalgliesh and Françoise [Taylor]. |
| 1941 | Three from Greenways | Alice Dalgliesh | Profits divided between the U.S. Committee for the Care of European Children and Save the Children Federation. |
| 1942 | George Washington's World | Genevieve Foster | Newbery Honor book |
| 1945 | Abraham Lincoln's World | Genevieve Foster | Newbery Honor book |
| 1946 | Bhimsa, the Dancing Bear | Christine Weston | Newbery Honor book |
| 1947 | Pedro, the Angel of Olvera Street | Written and illus. by Leo Politi | Caldecott Honor book |
| 1948 | Stone Soup | Retold and illus. by Marcia Brown | Caldecott Honor book |
| 1949 | Juanita | Written and illus. by Leo Politi | Caldecott Honor book |
| 1949 | George Washington | Genevieve Foster | Initial Biographies series, vol. 1 |
| 1950 | George Washington | Genevieve Foster | Newbery Honor book |
| 1950 | Song of the Swallows | Written and illus. by Leo Politi | Caldecott Medal Winner |
| 1950 | Henry Fisherman | Written and illus. by Marcia Brown | Caldecott Honor book |
| 1951 | The Egg Tree | Written and illus. by Katherine Milhous | Caldecott Medal Winner |
| 1951 | Dick Whittington and his Cat | Written and illus. by Marcia Brown | Caldecott Honor book |
| 1951 | Hans Christian Andersen's Fairy Tales | Edited by Svend Larsen, translated from the original Danish text by E. P. Keigwin | World Edition release |
| 1951 | A First Electrical Book for Boys | Alfred Powell Morgan | First in series of science books for boys. |
| 1952 | Skipper John's Cook | Written and illus. by Marcia Brown | Caldecott Honor book |
| 1952 | Puss in Boots | Trans. And illus. by Marcia Brown | Caldecott Honor book |
| 1953 | Farmer in the Sky | Robert Heinlein | Retro 1951 Hugo Award Winner |
| 1953 | The Bears on Hemlock Mountain | Alice Dalgliesh | Newbery Honor book |
| 1953 | Birthdays of Freedom, Vol. 1 | Genevieve Foster | Newbery Honor book |
| 1954 | The Thanksgiving Story | Illus. by Helen Sewell; by Alice Dalgliesh | Caldecott Honor book |
| 1954 | The Steadfast Tin Soldier | Illus. by Marcia Brown; translated by M. R. James | Caldecott Honor book |
| 1955 | Various | Various | Reissue of the 26 titles in Scribner Illustrated Classics series with new, full-color book jackets. |
| 1955 | The Courage of Sarah Noble | Alice Dalgliesh | Newbery Honor book Lewis Carroll Shelf Award Winner |
| 1955 | Cinderella; Or, The Little Glass Slipper | Illus. and trans. by Marcia Brown | Caldecott Medal Winner |
| 1956 | The Secret River | Marjorie Kinnan Rawlings | Newbery Honor book |
| 1959 | Have Space Suit-Will Travel | Robert Heinlein | Hugo Award nominee |
| 1960 | Houses from the Sea | illustrated by Adrienne Adams; by Alice Goudey | Caldecott Honor book |

== Selected works ==
- A Happy School Year, Rand McNally & Company, 1924, (reader);
- West Indian Play Days, Rand McNally, 1926;
- The Little Wooden Farmer, Macmillan, 1930; reprint, 1958, with illustrations by Anita Lobel, ISBN 978-0-02-725590-4;
- First Experiences with Literature, C. Scribner's Sons, 1932, (college textbook);
- The Choosing Book The Macmillan Company, 1932, color illustrations by Eloise Burns Wilkin;
- A Book for Jennifer : A Story of London Children in the Eighteenth Century and of Mr. Newbery's Juvenile Library, Scribner, 1940;
- The Silver Pencil, * C. Scribner's Sons, 1944; reprint, Scholastic Inc., 1992, ISBN 978-0-590-46010-1;
- Along Janet's Road, C. Scribner's Sons, 1946;
- Christmas; A Book of Stories New and Old, C. Scribner's Sons, 1950;
- The Bears on Hemlock Mountain, * C. Scribner's Sons, 1952; reprint, Simon and Schuster, 1992, ISBN 978-0-689-71604-1;
- The Courage of Sarah Noble, *+ C. Scribner's Sons, 1954; reprint, Baker & Taylor, CATS, 2009, ISBN 978-1-4420-1234-9;
- The Columbus Story, C. Scribner's Sons, 1955;
- The Thanksgiving Story, ^ illus. Helen Sewell, C. Scribner's Sons, 1954; reprint, Paw Prints, 2008, ISBN 978-1-4395-5424-1;
- The Fourth of July Story, C. Scribner's Sons, 1956; reprint, Simon & Schuster Children's Publishing, 1995, ISBN 978-0-689-71876-2;
- Aids to Choosing Books for Your Children, with Duff, Annis, (editors), Children's Book Council, 1957;
- Ride on the Wind, C. Scribner's Sons, 1956, (biography of Charles Lindbergh);
- The Enchanted Book, C. Scribner's Sons, 1958;
- America Begins: The Story of the Finding of the New World, with illustrations by Lois Maloy, C. Scribner's Sons, 1938;
- America Builds Homes, illustrated by Lois Maloy, C. Scribner's Sons, 1938
- The Choosing Book, 1932, Macmillan, illustrated by Eloise Wilkin

== Awards ==
- Newbery Honor Book *
- Lewis Carroll Shelf Award book (1959) +
- Caldecott Honor Book ^
