= The Two Reds =

1950 picture book by William Lipkind

- First edition
- Author: William Lipkind
- Illustrator: Nicholas Mordvinoff
- Publisher: Harcourt
- Publication date: 1948
- Pages: unpaged
- Awards: Caldecott Honor

The Two Reds is a 1950 picture book written by William Lipkind under the name Will and illustrated by Nicholas Mordvinoff under the name Nicholas. The book is a story of a red-haired boy and a red cat. The book was a recipient of a 1951 Caldecott Honor for its illustrations.
