= Maloy =

Maloy can refer to:

== People ==
=== Surname ===
- Lois Maloy (1902–1988), American children’s book illustrator
- Mike Maloy (1949–2009), American professional basketball player
- Thomas Joel Maloy (1906–1942), American naval officer, posthumous recipient of the Navy Cross
- William M. Maloy (1874–1949), American politician from Maryland

=== Given name ===
- Maloy Lozanes (fl. 1997–2010), Philippine-born recording artist in Germany known as MaLoY

== Geography ==
- Maloy, Iowa, a town in the United States
- Måløy, a town in Norway

== Other ==
- USS Maloy (DE-791), an American destroyer
