= Professor Bull's Umbrella =

1954 children's book by William Lipkind

- Authors: William Lipkind; Georges Schreiber
- Illustrator: Georges Schreiber
- Language: English
- Genre: Children's fiction
- Published: September 1954
- Publisher: The Viking Press (U.S.); Macmillan (Canada)
- Publication place: United States
- OCLC: 1412508

Professor Bull's Umbrella is a 1954 children's picture book written by William Lipkind and Georges Schreiber, with illustrations by Schreiber. About the journey of a professor's runaway umbrella, it was published by the Viking Press to positive reviews.

== Synopsis ==
Professor Bull is a man fond of music, radishes and his umbrella, Philip. One windy day, he loses Philip during a grocery errand. Humor and adventure ensue when it ventures throughout his town, with assorted denizens in pursuit.

== Background ==
Professor Bull's Umbrella was written by William Lipkind, who won the Caldecott Medal for Finders Keepers a few years prior to its publication. Lipkind had previously teamed up with Nicholas Mordvinoff for many of his works; for Umbrella, he collaborated with Georges Schreiber (1904–1977), an American immigrant from Belgium. Schreiber's illustrations—made with "pencil on grained Vinylite (Dinabase)"—are held in the May Massee Collection of the Emporia State University in Kansas.

== Reception ==
Professor Bull's Umbrella was published in September 1954 by the Viking Press to positive reviews, and was a Junior Literary Guild selection for Grades 2 and 3. Schreiber's illustrations were noted for their memorability and "umbrella's-eye view" perspective, while Marjorie Fischer of The New York Times Book Review commented on Philip the umbrella's human-like sentience.

Alice Brooks McGuire of the Saturday Review called it "a fluffy bit of fun" buoyed by Schreiber's work. The Montreal Star thought likewise, adding: "One of the better books for pre-school children...[this] is pure fun from the first colorful page to the last". Fischer said, "The humor is a little heavy in spots, or perhaps merely too adult, but Schreiber's pictures are lively". The Chicago Tribune wrote, "Lipkind...is a little uncertain in his role as a storyteller—but his studied whimsey is captured by the eye-catching fly-away illustrations". In later years, Patrick Groff would take note of the slapstick in Umbrella, but otherwise found it one of Lipkind's stories that "turn and twist with melodramatic, even haphazard, effects, which make for loose-jointed and irregular structures, hard to follow — and to believe."
