= List of fiction set in Nottingham =

List of fiction set in and around Nottingham, England

The list omits most works concerned with Robin Hood.

== Books ==
Each work and/or its author has a Wikipedia page. In date order:

- Things as They Are; or, The Adventures of Caleb Williams by William Godwin (1794)
- Sherwood Forest by Elizabeth Gooch (1804)
- Maid Marian by Thomas Love Peacock (1822)
- Gideon Giles the Roper by Thomas Miller (1841)
- The White Peacock by D. H. Lawrence (1911)
- Sons and Lovers by D. H. Lawrence (1913)
- The Rainbow by D. H. Lawrence (1915)
- Lady Chatterley's Lover by D. H. Lawrence (1928)
- Goose Fair by Cecil Roberts (1928)
- They Knew Mr. Knight by Dorothy Whipple (1934)
- Bows Against the Barons by Geoffrey Trease (1934)
- A Gun for Sale by Graham Greene (1936)
- Down Ryton Water by Eva Roe Gaggin (1941)
- They Were Sisters by Dorothy Whipple (1943)
- Penny Lace by Hilda Lewis (1946)
- The Hosanna Man by Philip Callow (1956)
- Penny Lace by Hilda Lewis (1957)
- Saturday Night and Sunday Morning by Alan Sillitoe (1958)
- Harris's Requiem by Stanley Middleton (1960)
- Key to the Door by Alan Sillitoe (1961)
- To Fear a Painted Devil by Ruth Rendell (1965)
- The Unfortunates by B. S. Johnson (1969)
- The Green Leaves of Nottingham by Pat McGrath (1970)
- A Start in Life by Alan Sillitoe (1970)
- Cold Gradations by Stanley Middleton (1972)
- Two Brothers by Stanley Middleton (1978)
- In a Strange Land by Stanley Middleton (1979)
- The Sun Has Got His Hat On by Derek Randall (1984)
- Charlie Resnick series by John Harvey (1989–2014)
- The Open Door by Alan Sillitoe (1989)
- Married Past Redemption by Stanley Middleton (1993)
- Sleepwalking by Julie Myerson (1994)
- The Touch by Julie Myerson (1996)
- A Midsummer's Nightmare by Gary Kilworth (1997)
- Me and the Fat Man by Julie Myerson (1998)
- Cold in Hand by John Harvey (1998)
- Love Lessons by David Belbin (1998)
- Laura Blundy by Julie Myerson (2000)
- Birthday by Alan Sillitoe (2001)
- Beholden by Clare Littleford (2003)
- Something Might Happen by Julie Myerson (2003)
- Brief Garlands by Stanley Middleton (2004)
- GB84 by David Peace (2004)
- Beyond Black by Hilary Mantel (2005)
- The Story of You by Julie Myerson (2006)
- The Killing Jar by Nicola Monaghan (2006)
- The Viscount's Betrothal by Louise Allen (2006)
- Out of Breath by Julie Myerson (2007)
- The Underground Man by Mick Jackson (2007)
- Secrets of Death by Stephen Booth (2007)
- Her Three Wise Men by Stanley Middleton (2008)
- Outlaw by Angus Donald (2009)
- A Cautious Approach by Stanley Middleton (2010)
- Secret Gardens by David Belbin (2011)
- Then by Julie Myerson (2011)
- Student by David Belbin (2011)
- Bone & Cane by David Belbin (2011)
- Top Hard by Stephen Booth (2012)
- What You Don't Know by David Belbin (2012)
- The Quickening by Julie Myerson (2013)
- Darkness, Darkness by John Harvey (2014)
- The Great Deception by David Belbin (2015)
- The Daylight Thief by Alan Williams (2015)
- The Stopped Heart by Julie Myerson (2016)
- The Taking of Annie Thorne by C. J. Tudor (2019)

Brummell's Last Riff by Alan Fletcher (1995)

The Learning Curve by Alan Fletcher (1996)

The Blue Millionaire by Alan Fletcher (1997)

== Plays ==
In date order. Some were staged locally for Nottingham audiences for limited runs.

- The Widowing of Mrs. Holroyd by D. H. Lawrence (1912)
- The Green Leaves of Nottingham based on Pat McGrath's novel (Nottingham Playhouse, 1973)
- Touched by Stephen Lowe (1977)
- Old Big 'ead in the Spirit of the Man by Stephen Lowe (Nottingham Playhouse, 2005)
- Mod Crop The Musical by Alan Fletcher and Steve Wallis (Nottingham Theatre Royal 2009 & Lace Market Theatre 2010)
- Diary of a Football Nobody adapted by William Ivory from the memoir Steak, Diana Ross... Diary of a Football Nobody by Dave McVay. (Nottingham Playhouse, 2012)
- Wonderland by Beth Steele, (Nottingham Playhouse, 2016)
- First Touch by Nathaniel Price (Nottingham Playhouse, 2022)

== Film ==
See also listing of films set in Nottingham.

- Saturday Night and Sunday Morning (film)

== Television shows ==
- Boon (TV series), series 3 to 7
