= Norman Krim =

American engineer (1913–2011)

Norman Krim - Raytheon Engineer and Engineering Manager (1933–1948), Vice President Receiving Tube Division (1948-1950) and First Vice President of Raytheon Receiving Tubes, Cathode Ray Tubes and Semiconductor Division (1950–11961). CEO and consultant for Radio Shack. Retired as Raytheon Historian.

Norman B. Krim (1913–2011) was an American electronics engineer and engineering executive. His drive to create a transistor product for the electronics experimenter-hobbyist market contributed to paving the path for a generation of American electronics engineers and technicians during the Space Race between the United States and the Soviet Union.

"The result was that a whole generation of aspiring engineers — kids, really, working in their garages and basements — got to make all kinds of electronic projects. A lot of them went on to become engineers." — Harry Goldstein, editor for IEEE Spectrum magazine.

== Early years ==
Krim was born June 3, 1913, in Manhattan, New York, one of four children of parents Abraham and Ida Krim. He graduated from George Washington High School at age 16, then attended Massachusetts Institute of Technology (MIT), where he graduated in 1934 in electrical engineering. He worked for most of his career for Raytheon, (over 75 years).

He began as an engineer at Raytheon when he was hired in 1933 during his junior year at MIT for 50 cents an hour. His first success was in the development of subminiature tubes, in the Special Tubes group. While working in the special tube division, before the outbreak of WW2, he wanted to use subminiature tubes in consumer products (hearing aids and radios). After Raytheon's success in subminiature tubes for wartime applications such as the proximity fuze, Raytheon became the leader in the design and production of subminiature tubes. Raytheon promoted Krim to be head of the Special Tube Division.

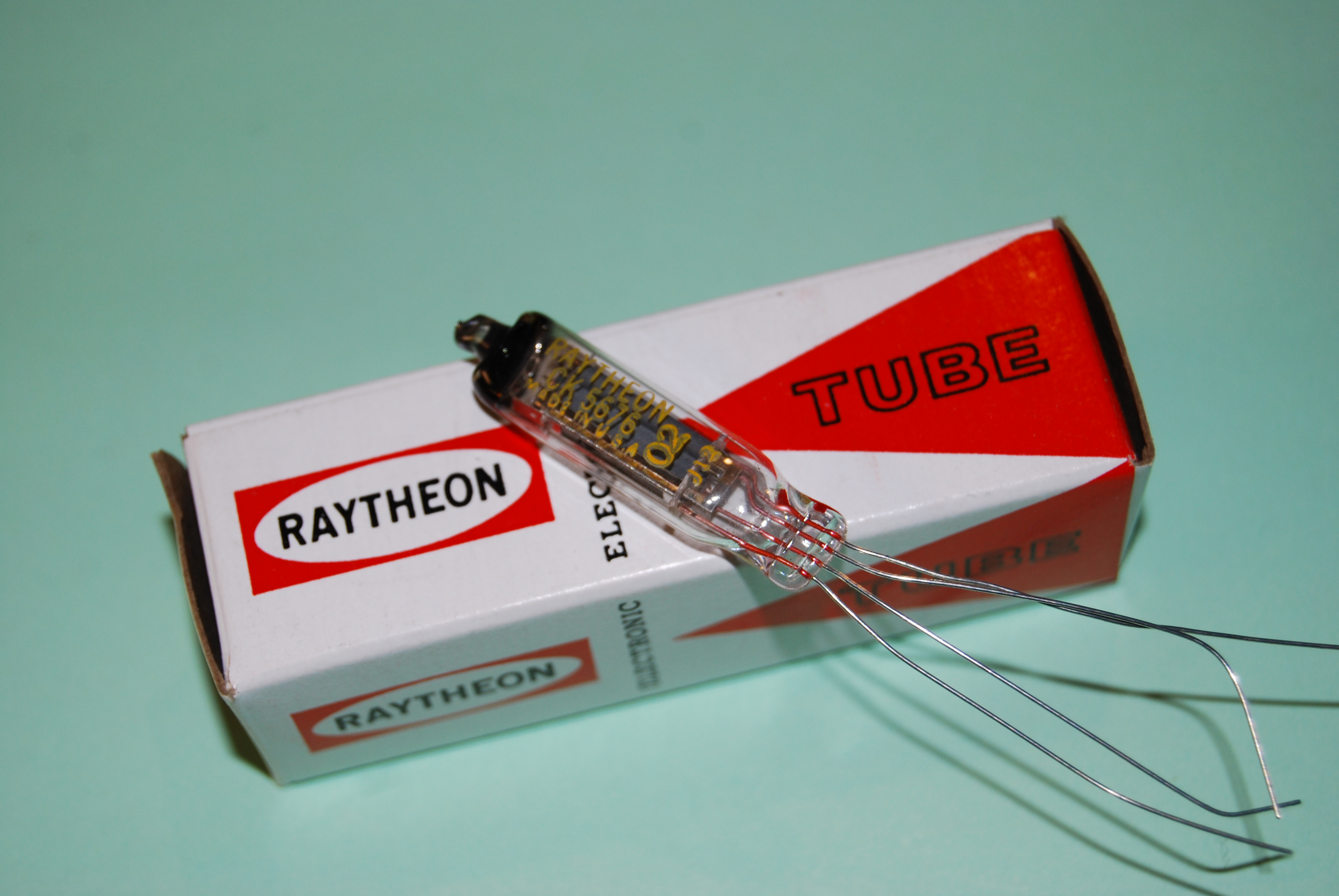
Raytheon Subminiature Tube (CK5676 shown)- Made the proximity fuze possible in wartime and the portable hearing aid possible in peacetime

The proximity fuze was a small device on an artillery shell that would detonate the shell when close to the target, without requiring a difficult direct hit. Previously, fuzes had relied on a time or altitude setting in the fuze and an estimated target height close enough that the shrapnel cloud would impact the target. Given the extremes of aircraft target range and speed, and of shell accuracy of the day, the proximity fuze dramatically increased the effectiveness of anti-aircraft fire. After World War Two ended, Norman Krim got the go-ahead from Laurence Marshall, head of Raytheon, to build the first pocket portable tube radio using and adapting subminiature tubes for commercial products. The radio was called the Belmont Boulevard, designed by Niles Gowell (Raytheon had acquired Belmont Radio Corp for this purpose).

== Raytheon Semiconductor Products ==
Although the Belmont Boulevard did not sell well, he later was given another challenge by Laurence Marshall, the head of Raytheon, to start making semiconductor products. Under his direction, Raytheon became a leader in making hearing aid transistors. A Time article in 1953 stated, "This little device, a single speck of germanium, is smaller than a paper clip and works perfectly at one-tenth the power needed by the smallest vacuum tube. Today, much of Raytheon’s transistor output goes to America's hearing aid industry." The hearing aid was the first mass-produced consumer electronic device to be miniaturized. By 1948 Raytheon had 98% of the hearing aid tube market. Because of the invention of the transistor by Bell Labs in 1948, Raytheon, under Krim's direction, started making transistors for hearing aids. Their first transistor product was the CK703 point-contact transistor. His successes in Raytheon's Semiconductor Products allowed him to become Vice President of Receiving, Cathode Ray Tubes and Semiconductor Division.

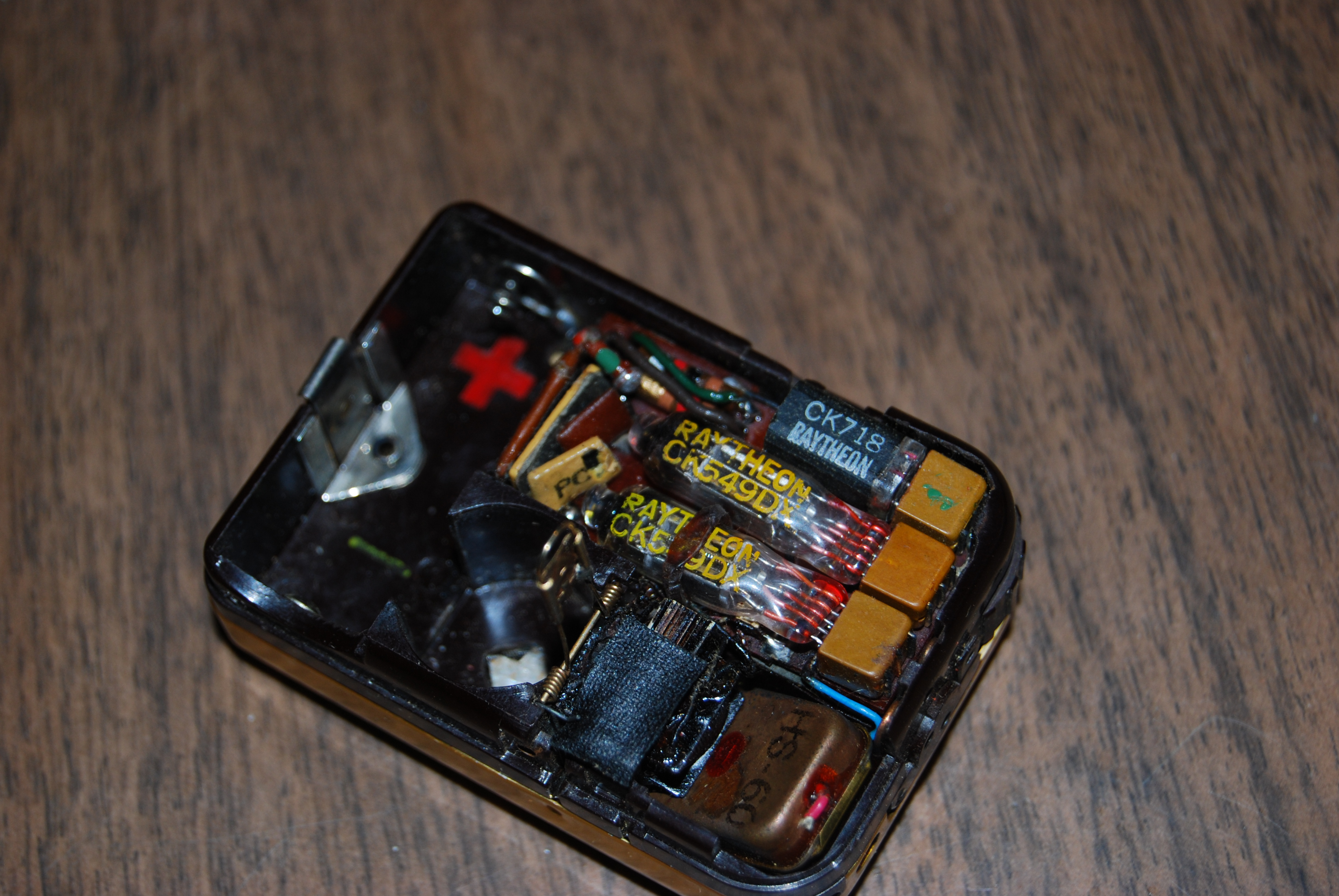
1954 Acousticon Hearing Aid with Hybrid Design showing Raytheon CK549DX Hearing Aid Tubes and the Raytheon CK718 Hearing Aid Transistor

He is particularly known for developing the first mass-production alloy-junction transistor and used the fallouts or transistors that did not meet specifications as transistors to be sold at a much lower cost, the CK721 and CK722. Raytheon quickly moved into alloy-junction transistors because they were lower noise, more rugged, and lent themselves to mass production compared to point-contact transistors. Establishing a tradition that would become a distinctive feature of early transistors, these (CK722) were production dropouts from another transistor line, the CK721, that did not pass test criteria for the CK718 hearing aid transistor (the main product). However, they could be sold at a much lower cost as a lower specification product. This concept helped start a new market for transistors, the experimenter and hobby line. Seeing this window of opportunity, Krim linked up with Radio Shack to market the hobby-grade transistors. Other manufacturers followed soon after.

Early- Before 1956

- CK718 hearing aid transistor PASS ALL TEST sell to hearing aid companies
  - DID NOT MEET ALL KEY PARAMETERS retest as CK721 and CK722
    - HAS highest gain and lowest noise label as CK721 sell as audio amplifier
      - lower gain and higher noise label as CK722 sell as hobby/experimenter

Later as transistor yield improved and size got smaller- After 1956

- CK78X series (CK781 thru CK789) mini hearing aid transistor PASS ALL TESTS sell to hearing aid companies
  - DID NOT MEET ALL KEY PARAMETERS retest as CK721 and CK722
    - HAS highest gain and lowest noise put mini transistor into larger case label CK721
      - lower gain and higher noise put mini transistor into larger case label CK722

In the later runs, Raytheon kept the bigger transistor case size for the CK721 and CK722. A possible reason was marketing. The size was like an identifying physical trademark. Many people who used these transistors still remembered what they looked like.

== Transistor radios ==
Although Regency is credited with building and marketing the first Transistor Radio (Model TR-1 in 1954), Raytheon was only a few months behind with the 8TP1 through 4 "lunchbox" style radio. Norman Krim was involved in the early transistor radio designs. According to Krim, at the Chapel St labs, they made a six-transistor superheterodyne radio in 1952-53. Transistor radio designs for mass production went to Belmont Radio Corporation, headed by Henry F. Argento, a division of Raytheon.

Unlike Regency (IDEA Inc), Raytheon used its own transistors. Regency contracted with Texas Instruments, a young upcoming semiconductor manufacturer. According to Consumer Reports Magazine articles dated April and July 1955, the Raytheon was a better radio (used 7 transistors vs 4 in the Regency), but was quite a bit larger. Raytheon marketed only four models (8TP series, T-100 series, T-150 series, and T-2500) and got out of the transistor radio market after 1956.

== Later career and retirement ==
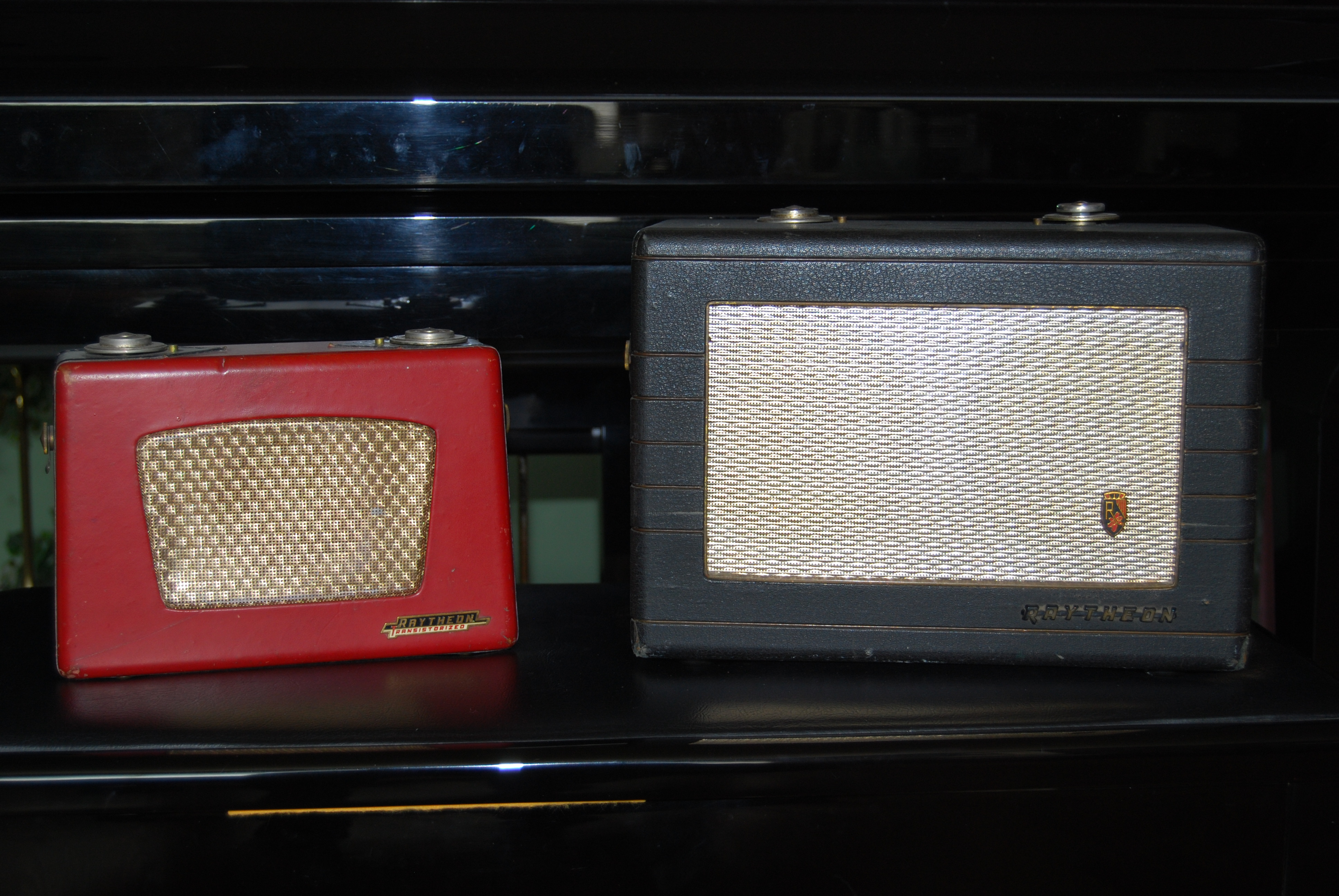
Raytheon Transistor Radios. LEFT 8TP4 World's 2nd Transistor Radio (1955) and RIGHT T-2500 Raytheon's Last Transistor Radio (1956)

Krim was married to the former Beatrice Barron (deceased in 1994) for 52 years. They had three children: Robert, Arthur, and Donald.

For a brief time, he left his VP position at Raytheon and served as CEO of Radio Shack from 1961 to 1963. He sold his interests to the Tandy Corporation in 1962. He returned to Raytheon until his retirement in 1997. During those years, he was also part of a consulting firm. In later years, he would act as Raytheon's in-house historian. Krim was a senior member of the Institute of Electrical and Electronics Engineers or IEEE. He died in December 2011, in Newton, Massachusetts, at the age of 98.

== Engineering contribution to society ==
The Belmont Boulevard (1945), A Vacuum Tube Pocket Radio Using Raytheon Subminiature Tubes

According to Jack Ward's Semiconductor Museum, Krim is credited with inspiring the transistor hobbyist and experimenter market with the creation of the CK721 and CK722. As Jack Ward, curator of the Semiconductor Museum website, states:

Many of the talented and dedicated professionals and amateurs who have been responsible for the tremendous rise of the electronics industry over the past four decades can still remember the time when, as a young hobbyist, they were able to scrape together enough money (maybe through saving allowance or cutting the neighbor’s grass) to buy that first CK722

From the CK722 came articles in electronics magazines and books and pamphlets on do-it-yourself building projects, as well as competition, notably General Electric, who following Krim's lead of recycling out-of-specification transistors, came up with the 2N107 transistor.
