= CK722 =

First low-cost transistor available to the general public, introduced in 1953

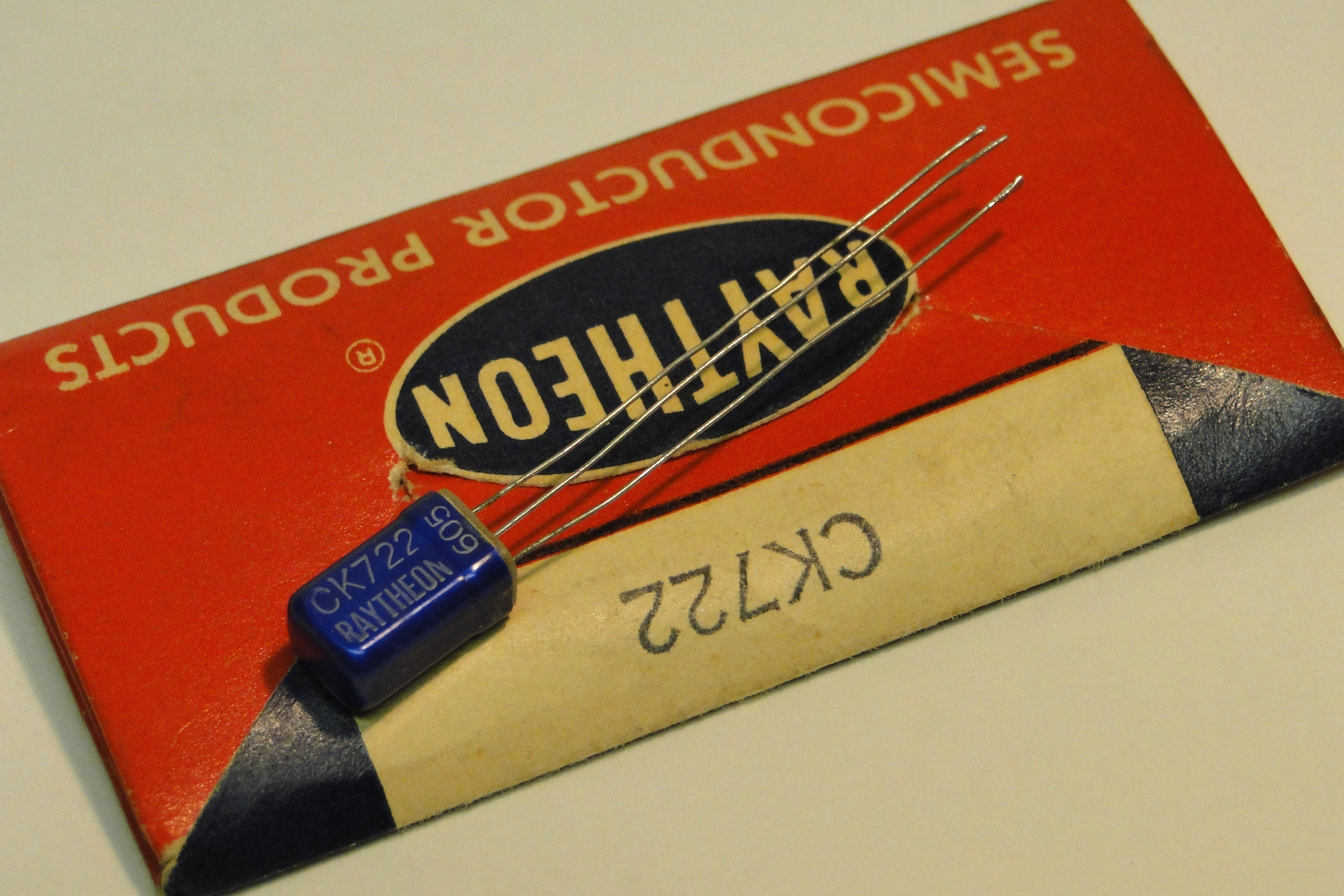
CK722 transistor and package

The CK722 was the first low-cost junction transistor available to the general public. It was a PNP germanium small-signal unit. Developed by Norman Krim, it was introduced by Raytheon in early 1953 for $7.60 each; the price was reduced to $3.50 in late 1954 and to $0.99 in 1956. Norm Krim selected Radio Shack to sell the CK721 and CK722 through their catalog. Krim had a long-standing personal and business relationship with Radio Shack. The CK722s were selected "fall out" from the Raytheon's premium-priced CK721 (which are fallouts from CK718 hearing-aid transistors). Raytheon actively encouraged hobbyists with design contests and advertisements.

In the 1950s and 1960s, hundreds of hobbyist electronics projects based around the CK722 transistor were published in popular books and magazines. Raytheon also participated in expanding the role of the CK721/CK722 as a hobbyist electronics device by publishing "Transistor Applications" and "Transistor Applications – Volume 2" during the mid-1950s.

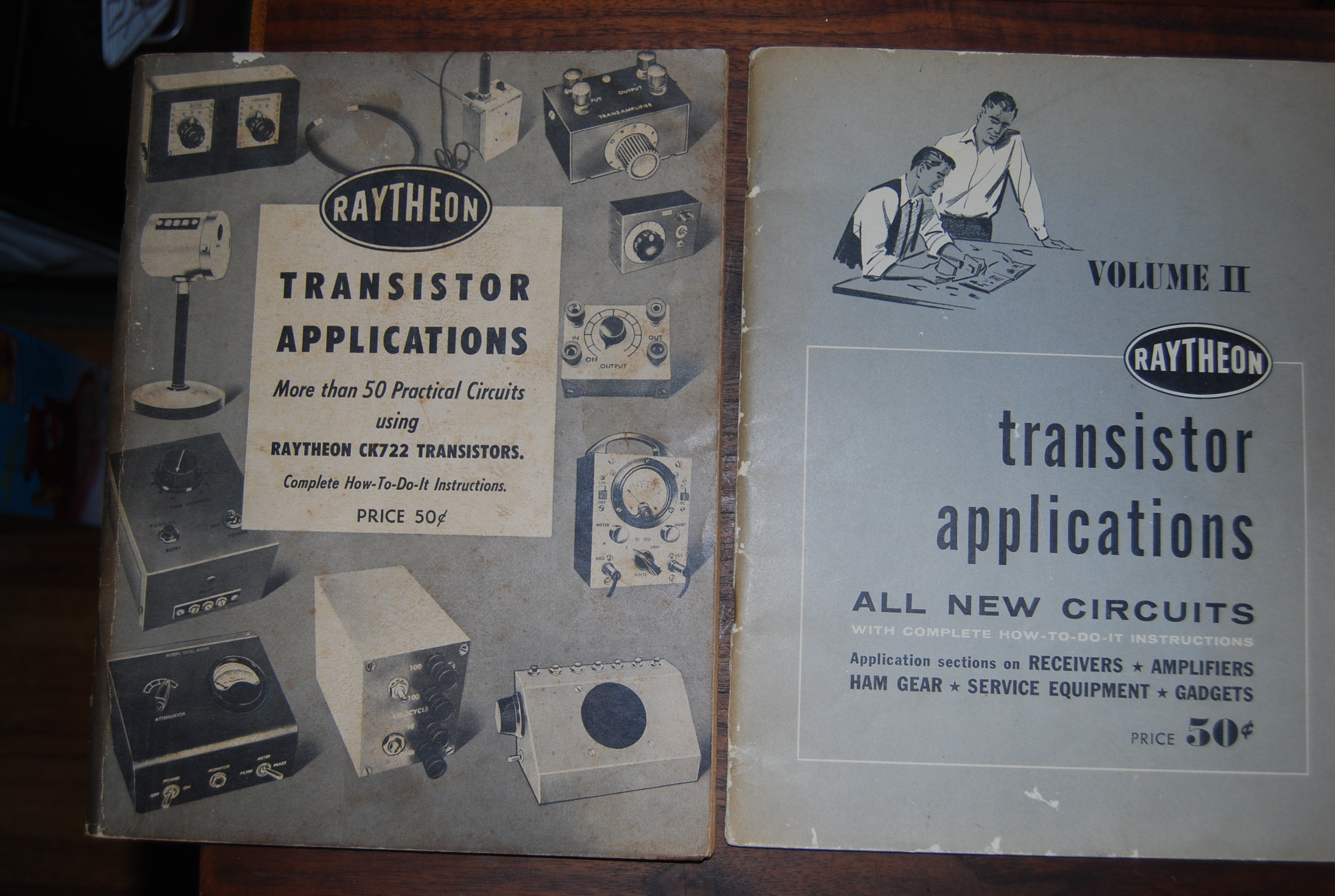
Transistor application books for CK722 by Raytheon

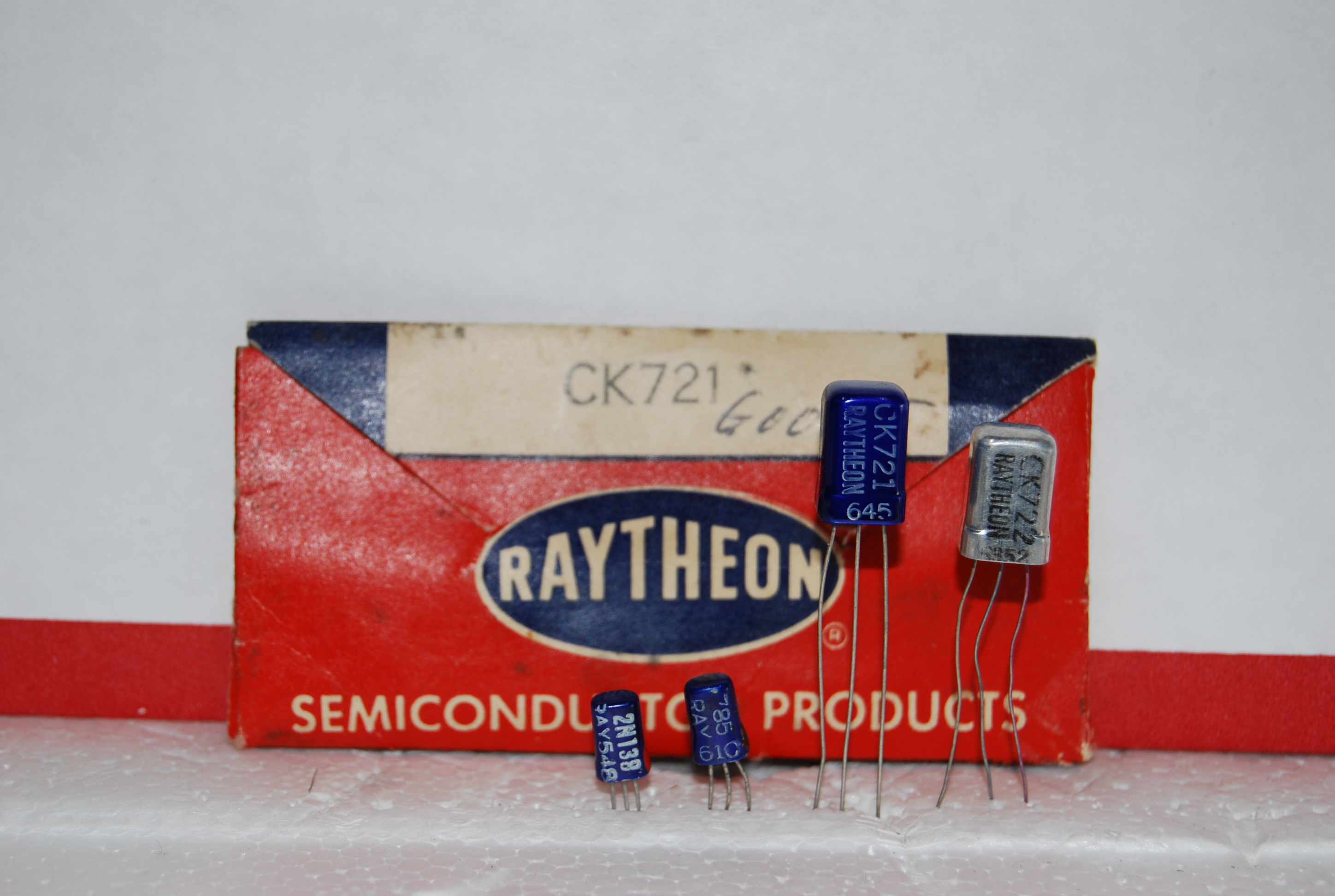
Size comparison and metal case colors of Raytheon hearing aid transistors on the left and the CK721 (blue) and CK722 (silver) on the right. The rejected hearing aid transistors would be inside the metal cases of the CK721 and CK722.

== Construction ==
The original CK722 were direct fallouts from CK718 hearing-aid transistors that did not meet specifications. These fallouts were later stamped with CK721 or CK722 numbers based on gain, noise and other dynamic characteristics. Early CK722s were plastic-encapsulated and had a black body. As Raytheon improved its production of hearing-aid transistors with the introduction of the smaller CK78x series, the body of the CK721/CK722s was changed to a metal case. Raytheon, however, kept the basic body size and used a unique method by taking the smaller CK78x rejects and inserting it into the larger body and sealing it. The first metal-cased CK721/CK722s were blue, and the later ones were silver. More details of this can be found in Jack Ward's website, Semiconductor Museum or the CK722 Museum, see external link reference below.

== Engineers associated with the CK722 ==
=== Norman Krim – father of the transistor hobbyist market ===
In the late 1930s, Norm Krim, then an engineer for Raytheon, was looking into subminiature tubes for use in consumer applications such as hearing aids and pocket radios. Krim's team developed the CK501X subminiature amplifier tube that could run on penlight A type batteries and small 22.5 V B-type batteries.

Following World War II, Krim was interested in developing the first pocket vacuum tube radio. Raytheon approved, and a team headed by Krim designed a set of subminiature tubes specifically for radios (2E32, 2E36, 2E42 and 2G22). Raytheon’s acquisition of Belmont Radio proved prescient, and the result was the Belmont Boulevard in 1945. The radio did not sell well, and Raytheon took a loss. Despite this setback, Krim remained at the company and shifted his attention to the newly developed transistor.

=== Carl David Todd – participant in the CK722 design contest ===
Carl Todd, a hobbyist and later engineer in GE’s transistor division, placed 6th in Raytheon's CK722 design contest. His hobby work with this early transistor inspired him to pursue electrical engineering as a career. As an engineer, he helped develop the 2N107 transistor, GE's alternative to the CK722.

== See also ==
- Alfred Powell Morgan – an author of youth-oriented books on early electronics
