= The Bears on Hemlock Mountain =

1952 book by Alice Dalgliesh

- Author: Alice Dalgliesh
- Illustrator: Helen Sewell
- Publisher: Scribner
- Publication date: 1952
- ISBN: 978-0-689-71604-1

The Bears on Hemlock Mountain (1952), written by Alice Dalgliesh and illustrated by Helen Sewell, is a children's novella based, according to the author's note, on a tall tale from Pennsylvania. It won a 1953 Newbery Honor award.

== Critical reception ==
"Her historical fiction, combined with its believable characters and dramatic plots, is renowned for its accuracy and detail. The Bears on Hemlock Mountain is a perfect example of Dalgliesh getting this delicate balance right. According to the author, the story is based on an old Pennsylvania tall tale, to which Dalgliesh has given great detail and form." Speaking to parents of six- and seven-year-olds, Choosing Books for Kids includes the book on its list of "safe bets that you'll probably enjoy as much as your appreciative listener."

== Bibliography ==
- The Bears on Hemlock Mountain. Scribner. 1952. ISBN 9780689716041.; reprint, Simon and Schuster, 1992, ISBN 978-0-689-71604-1
