= The Thanksgiving Story =

Book by Alice Dalgliesh

- Cover showing Caldecott Medal
- Author: Alice Dalgliesh
- Illustrator: Helen Sewell
- Cover artist: Sewell
- Language: English
- Genre: Picture book
- Publisher: Charles Scribner's Sons
- Publication date: 1954
- Publication place: United States
- Media type: Print
- Pages: 32 pp
- ISBN: 0689710534

The Thanksgiving Story, written by Alice Dalgliesh and illustrated by Helen Sewell, is a 1954 picture book published by Demco Media and Charles Scribner's Sons. The Thanksgiving Story was the runner-up for the Caldecott Medal for 1955 and is a Caldecott Honor Medal book. The Thanksgiving Story was reprinted in paperback by Aladdin Paperbacks in 1985 and reissued in hardcover by Atheneum Books for Young Readers in 1988.

== Description ==
The story, written by Dalgliesh, is about the first Thanksgiving in America. The story revolves around the Hopkins family, who were passengers on the crowded Mayflower. It is described through the eyes of three Puritan children.

== Plot ==
Passengers aboard the Mayflower, Giles, Constance and Damaris Hopkins are on the way to the New World to start a new life with their parents. Their baby brother Oceanus is born on the crowded ship. On their arrival, the Pilgrims face hardships of hunger, cold and sickness. They go through a harsh winter in Plymouth. When spring comes, the settlers plant crops with the help of two Native Americans, Samoset and Squanto. Due to the help of the Native Americans, the Pilgrims are able to survive their first year. The story concludes with a great feast to which the Pilgrims invite the Native American chief Massasoit, Squanto and their people who helped them survive hunger, cold and sickness in the New World.

== Critical reception ==
The Thanksgiving Story has received mixed reviews with 3 out of 5 stars from Barnes & Noble and Google Books. Critics claim while the story is very detailed and nicely organized, it is an outdated story of what happened between the Pilgrims and Native Americans.

== See also ==
- 1954 in literature
- Children's literature
- Picture books
