= The Silver Pencil =

1944 novel by Alice Dalgliesh

- First edition
- Author: Alice Dalgliesh
- Illustrator: Katherine Milhous
- Language: English
- Genre: Children's novel
- Publication date: 1944
- Publication place: United States
- Media type: Print
- Pages: 256
- ISBN: 0140347925

The Silver Pencil is a children's novel by Alice Dalgliesh. Based on the author's life, it tells of the childhood and young adulthood of Janet Laidlaw in the early years of the twentieth century. She moves from Trinidad to England, then to the United States and Nova Scotia, Canada, becoming a teacher and a writer. The novel, illustrated by Katherine Milhous, was first published in 1944 and was a Newbery Honor recipient in 1945.
