= The Courage of Sarah Noble =

1954 novel by Alice Dalgliesh

- First edition
- Author: Alice Dalgliesh
- Cover artist: Leonard Weisgard
- Genre: Historical Fiction
- Publisher: Scribner and Sons
- Publication date: 1954

The Courage of Sarah Noble by Alice Dalgliesh is the story of a young girl who travels with her father into Connecticut during the early 18th century, and her experiences with the native Schaghticoke. It was published in 1954 and received a Newbery Honor Award.

== The story ==
Sarah accompanies her father in his journey to set up their farm in a newly purchased plot in New Milford. Once they arrive, Sarah and her father begin scouting the land he has bought. They are approached by the people who lived there, the Schaghticoke. Sarah is frightened because of rumors she has heard from children about the "Indians" they would encounter, but finds that the Schaghticoke are friendly to her and her father. Sarah and her father befriend one of the local Indian families, who take care of her when her father is forced to return alone to their old home to retrieve the rest of their family.

== History ==
Alice Dalgliesh begins the book with an author's note. In the note, she states that this story is true and she makes reference to records of the events. The New Milford Historical Society holds the majority of the resources for this research.

== Reception ==
The New York Times Book Review said of The Courage of Sarah Noble "This story is one to be long remembered for its beautiful simplicity and dignity." The American lists it among their best books for 1954 for juveniles to read. Reviewer Anita Silvey appreciates Sarah's character when she calls her "a protagonist strong enough to accompany her father into the wilderness to build a new cabin for their family and to remain there alone when Father goes back for the rest of the family."
