= Katherine Milhous =

American writer

- Born: November 27, 1894; Philadelphia, Pennsylvania, USA
- Died: December 5, 1977 (aged 83); Philadelphia
- Occupations: Graphic artist, illustrator, writer
- Writing career
- Period: 1938–1964 (books)
- Genres: Children's picture books; posters
- Subject: Pennsylvania (posters)
- Notable work: The Egg Tree
- Notable awards: Caldecott Medal; 1951

Katherine Milhous (1894–1977) was an American artist, illustrator, and writer. She is known best as the author and illustrator of The Egg Tree, which won the 1951 Caldecott Medal for U.S. picture book illustration. Born into a Quaker family active in the printing industry in Philadelphia, Milhous is also known for her graphic designs for the Works Progress Administration (WPA). Her work has been exhibited at the 1939 New York World's Fair and at the Pennsylvania Academy of the Fine Arts.

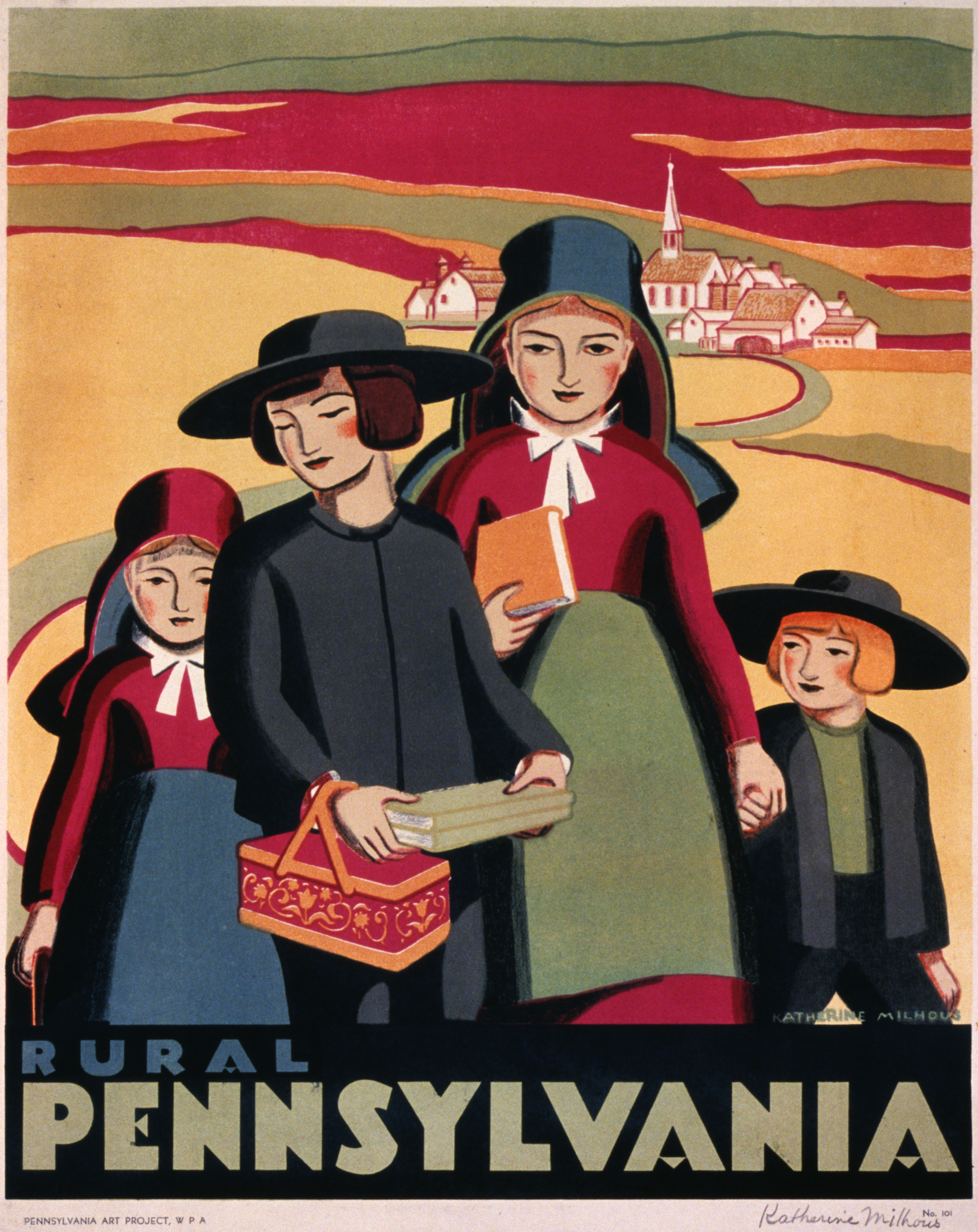
Poster promoting Pennsylvania, showing children from a religious community (Lithograph, original artwork by Milhous)

== Life ==
Katherine Milhous was born November 27, 1894, to Osborn and Katherine Daly Milhous of Philadelphia, Quakers who made their living as printers. When she was young they moved to Pitman, New Jersey, a small camp-meeting town. She returned to Philadelphia to attend the Pennsylvania Academy of the Fine Arts and the Pennsylvania Museum School of Industrial Art. Milhous helped support her schooling by illustrating magazines. In 1934, while at the Academy of Fine Arts, she won the Cresson Traveling Fellowship, which allowed her to study overseas. She then returned to Philadelphia where, for forty years, she shared a studio with her partner and fellow-artist Frances Lichten.

From 1935 to 1940 Milhous was a supervisor for the Philadelphia Federal Art Project (FAP), a branch of the Works Progress Administration. Among her duties was the creation of posters promoting Pennsylvania. She incorporated familiar Pennsylvania Dutch designs into her posters. Alice Dalgliesh, head of the Children's Book division of Charles Scribner's & Sons, saw Milhous' posters during an exhibition in an FAP gallery, and hired her as a staff designer. Milhous co-wrote and illustrated several books with Dalgliesh, who was also an award-winning children's writer. She also illustrated for others, as well as writing and illustrating her own books.

Milhous was a member of the American Institute of Graphic Arts. She died in Philadelphia on December 5, 1977. Her papers are held in the Free Library of Philadelphia's Children's Literature Research Collection and the University of Minnesota Children's Literature Research Collection.

== Critical reception ==
Milhous' books were generally well received by reviewers, both for their writing and their illustrations. Appalonia's Valentine was called "distinguished… original and beautiful". On Patrick and the Golden Slippers, about Philadelphia's Mummers' Parade, the same magazine wrote "This is a picture book of enduring value to young Americans." In her Caldecott Medal-winning The Egg Tree, "Her use of bright tempera paints brought to life the bold borders and vibrant pages of the book."

== Selected works ==
=== Written and illustrated ===
- Once on a Time (Charles Scribner's Sons, 1938), edited by Alice Dalgliesh and Katherine Milhous
- Lovina: A Story of the Pennsylvania Country (Scribner, 1940)
- Herodia, the Lovely Puppet (Scribner, 1942)
- Corporal Keeperupper (Scribner, 1943)
- The First Christmas Crib (Scribner, 1944)
- Snow over Bethlehem (Scribner, 1945)
- The Egg Tree (Scribner, 1950)
- Patrick and the Golden Slippers (Scribner, 1951)
- Appolonia’s Valentine (Scribner, 1954)
- With Bells On: A Christmas Story (Scribner, 1955)
- Through These Arches: The Story of Independence Hall (J. B. Lippincott & Co., 1964)

=== Illustrated ===
- Happily Ever After: Fairy Tales (Scribner, 1939), edited by Alice Dalgliesh
- A Book for Jennifer, A Story of London Children in the Eighteenth Century and of Mr. Newbery's Juvenile Library (Scribner, 1940), by Dalgliesh
- Billy Button's Buttered Biscuit (Frederick A. Stokes, 1941), by Mabel Leigh Hunt
- Wings around South America(Scribner, 1941), by Dalgliesh
- They Live in South America (Scribner, 1942), by Dalgliesh, illustrated by Milhous and Frances Lichten
- The Little Angel: A Story of Old Rio (Scribner, 1943), by Dalgliesh
- The Silver Pencil (Scribner, 1944), by Dalgliesh
- The Brownies (Scribner, 1946), by Juliana Ewing (1865)
- Old Abe: American Eagle (Scribner, 1946), by Lorraine Sherwood
- Along Janet's Road (Scribner, 1946), by Dalgliesh

== See also ==
- Fraktur (Pennsylvania German folk art)
