= Down Ryton Water =

1941 children's novel by Eva Roe Gaggin

- First edition
- Author: Eva Roe Gaggin
- Illustrator: Elmer Hader
- Language: English
- Genre: Children's literature
- Publisher: Viking
- Publication date: 1940
- Publication place: United States
- Pages: 369

Down Ryton Water is a 1940 children's historical novel written by Eva Roe Gaggin and illustrated by Elmer Hader. It tells the story of the Separatists of Scrooby and the Pilgrim Fathers through the first-person narrative of young Matt Over.

The book received a Newbery Honor in 1941. The New York Times praised the novel's richness and scope, overlooking its narrative dissonance – Matt, a boy, seemily has a feminine viewpoint.
