= George Washington (book) =

1949 children's book by Genevieve Foster

George Washington: An Initial Biography
- First edition
- Author: Genevieve Foster
- Illustrator: Genevieve Foster
- Language: English
- Genre: Children's literature
- Publisher: Scribner's
- Publication date: 1949
- Publication place: United States
- Pages: 93
- ISBN: 978-0-684-20818-3

George Washington: An Initial Biography is a 1949 children's biography of George Washington written and illustrated by Genevieve Foster. Though written in simple language, the biography has been described as comprehensive and scrupulously authentic. The book was Foster's second book about George Washington, after George Washington's World, and earned her a third Newbery Honor in 1950.
