= 2N107 =

Early germanium alloy-junction PNP transistor

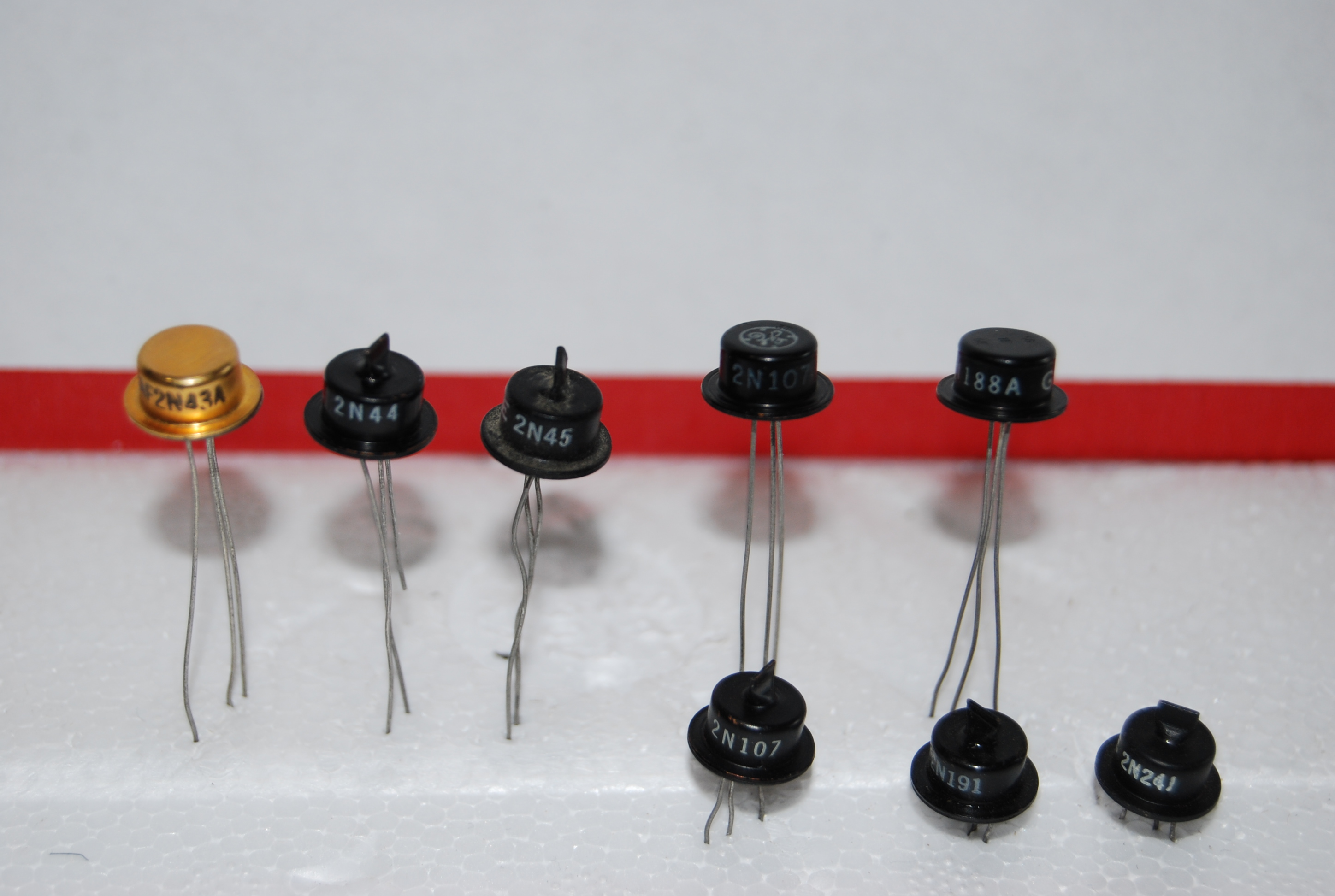
1950's PNP Transistors by General Electric. TOP ROW (L–R): 2N43, 2N44, 2N45, 2N107 and 2N188A BOTTOM ROW: 2N107, 2N191 and 2N241

The 2N107 is an early germanium alloy-junction PNP transistor developed by General Electric (GE) in 1955, and was GE's entry into the electronic hobbyist market originally started with Raytheon's CK722 transistor. Like the CK722, it enjoyed a long-standing popularity. General Electric decided to designate it with a JEDEC 2N- series identification. This is unusual for a hobby device. Soon after, other manufacturers got involved in the hobby business like Sylvania, Tung-Sol and RCA.

== History ==
A detailed story of the conception of the 2N106 can be heard in an interview of Carl Todd by Jack Ward on the Semiconductor Museum Website.

The 2N107 was conceived in 1955 by Carl David Todd, who had just joined GE as an engineer. Todd's interest in a hobby/experimental transistor probably originated when he participated in one of the CK722 transistor design contests, while he was an engineering student at Auburn University and finished sixth. The success of the CK722 gave impetus for Carl Todd to convince GE marketing to follow the path of Raytheon, the inventor of the CK722. General Electric had a multiple of 2N43 through 2N45 type transistors that did not meet specifications. Like Norman Krim at Raytheon, Carl Todd wanted to increase GE's transistor market by expanding into the hobbyist market.

Like Raytheon's CK722, the GE 2N107 were fallouts or rejects of GE's successful 2N43, 2N44 and 2N45 alloy-junction transistors. Unlike early Raytheon transistors, which were sealed in a resin material, GE devices were housed in metal hermetically-sealed enclosures, removing oxygen and other potential contaminants to ensure reliability and long life, since many of the 2N43-45 transistors were used in military applications. Unlike most transistors sold in the 1950s that cost $10 or more, the 2N107's initial price was under $2.00.

The 2N107 enjoyed a very long product life, starting in 1955, and continuing into the 1970s. It outlasted Raytheon's CK722. In the 1960s, ETCO became a secondary manufacturer (second source) of the transistor, but in the standard TO-5 case instead of the "top hat." In the 1980s, the transistor was discontinued by GE, but unmarked versions in the TO-5 case were sold in multiples by RadioShack, Poly Paks, Olson Electronics, and other electronic outlets.

General Electric pioneered the alloy-junction transistor process for germanium transistors. Bell Labs, the inventor of the transistor, also had a similar process (called the rate-grown junction process), but many manufacturers preferred GE's process because it was better suited to mass production and resulted in higher yields. The 2N43-45 series was GE's first commercial alloy-junction transistor using the 2N numbering system.

== Hobby references ==
Allied Radio's 2N107 Experimenter's Book "Understanding Transistors and Transistor Projects" Milton Kiver-EDITOR

The operating parameters of the 2N107 are similar to Raytheon's CK722 and many hobbyist books would use both interchangeably. J.A. Stanley's, "Electronics for the Beginner" specifies the 2N107 or CK722 in the parts list. Allied Radio, which sold both transistors through their catalog, sold a project book called "Understanding Transistors and Transistor Projects" dedicated to the 2N107. Another hobbyist book dedicated to the 2N107 was "Using Electronics" by Harry Zarchy, which emphasized simplicity and minimized construction sophistication. General Electric also devoted its share of 2N107 publishing by listing transistor applications in their transistor data books.

Sample Pages from Allied Radio's Understanding Transistors and Transistor Projects Book

== GE 2N170 – the 2N107 companion ==
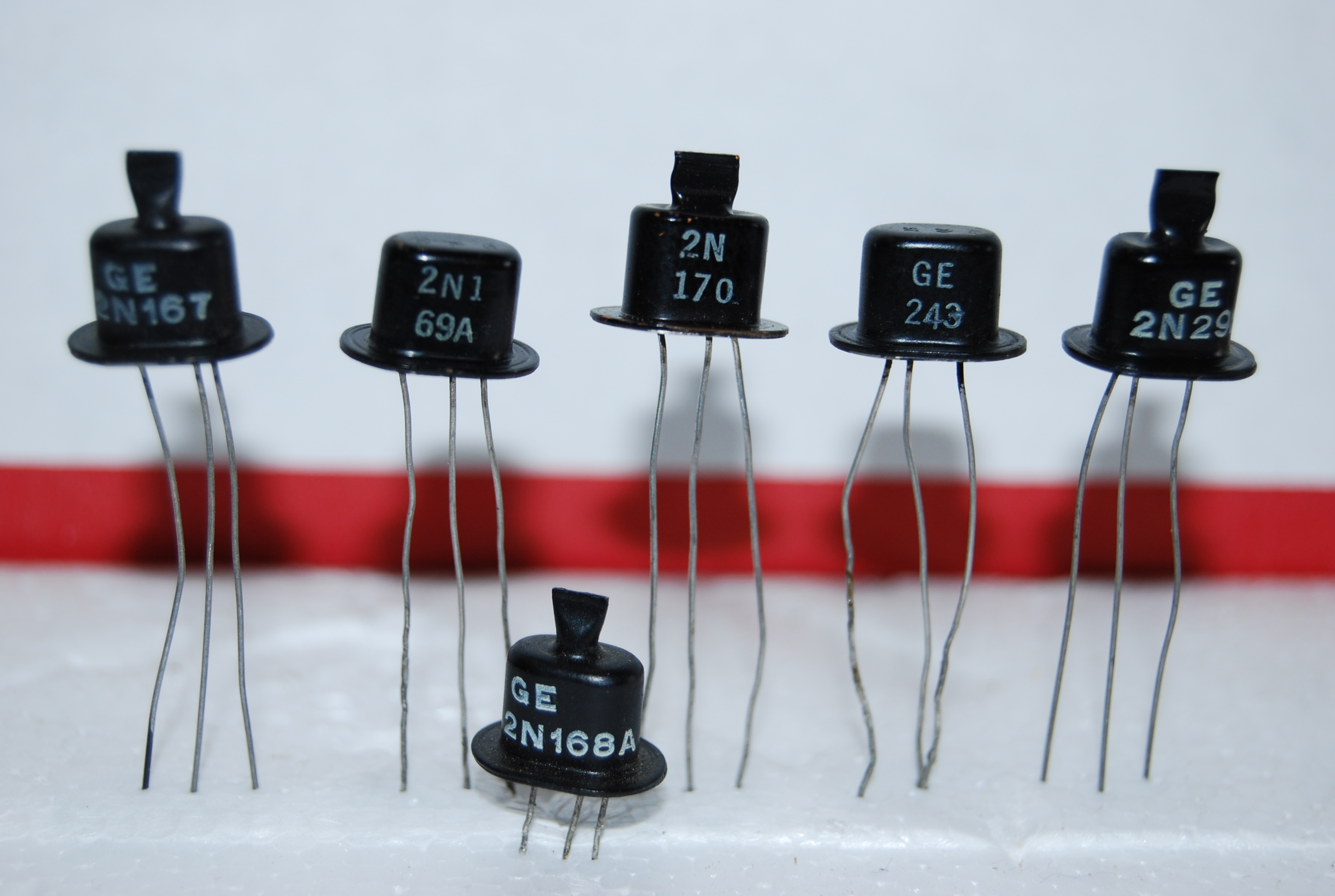
1950's GE NPN transistors. (L–R) 2N167, 2N169, 2N170, 2N169 and 2N292. BOTTOM 2N168A

In 1956, GE engineers added an NPN transistor companion to the 2N107. They designated it the 2N170, manufactured with the rate grown junction process originally developed by Bell Labs. It was designed for use in higher frequency applications, such as radio frequency (RF) amplification, while the 2N107 was for low frequency audio amplifier applications. The 2N170 was priced slightly higher than the 2N107. The 2N170 was a fallout from the 2N167, 2N168 and 2N169 transistor lines. In the 1950s, General Electric distinguished their PNP and NPN transistors by their case styles. PNP transistors had the round, black "top hat" style body, while NPN transistors had oval, black "top hats".

== Construction ==
As stated earlier, GE used a metal hermetically sealed case to house the transistor. They used the in-line set-off lead configuration to identify the collector lead on one end, while the base and emitter leads were closer to each other, with the emitter lead at the other end. Early GE transistors had a pinch tab on top of the "top hat" for removing the contaminants and then sealing the case. Later the pinched top was not used.

Excerpt from GE Essential Characteristics (1973) showing general data and suggested price of the 2N107 and 2N170 transistors

Excerpt from GE Essential Characteristics 14th Ed.
