= The Big Snow =

1948 picture book by Berta and Elmer Hader

- First edition
- Author: Berta and Elmer Hader
- Illustrator: Berta and Elmer Hader
- Genre: Children's picture book
- Publisher: Simon & Schuster
- Publication date: 1948
- Publication place: United States

The Big Snow is a book by Berta and Elmer Hader. Released by Macmillan Publishers, it was the recipient of the Caldecott Medal for illustration in 1949.

== Synopsis ==
The Big Snow tells the story of how the woodland animals prepare themselves for the upcoming winter. The animals, after noticing the falling leaves and how quickly the days begin to darken they know that it is wintertime. The geese fly south looking for sunshine and a clear sky while the rest start to get ready for the cold weather.

== Awards ==
- ALA Notable Children's Books
- ALA Caldecott Medal (1949)

Awards
Preceded by White Snow, Bright Snow	Caldecott Medal recipient 1949	Succeeded by Song of the Swallows
