= Eva Roe Gaggin =

American writer

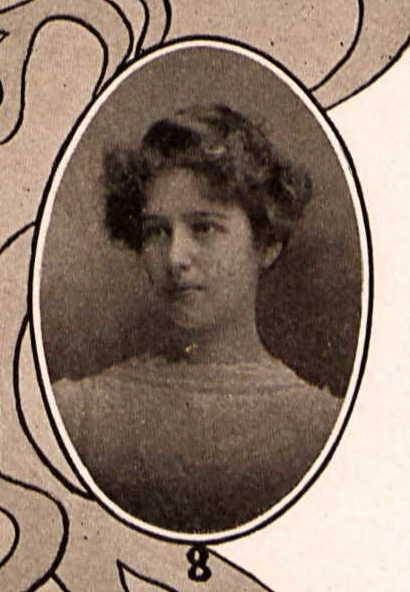
- Born: January 9, 1879; Lawrence
- Died: May 7, 1966 (aged 87)
- Parent(s): Edward Drake Roe
- Awards: Newbery Medal (1942)

Eva Roe Gaggin (January 9, 1879 – May 7, 1966), also known as E. R. Gaggin, was an American children's book author. She won a Newbery Honor in 1942 for her book, Down Ryton Water.

== Life ==
Gaggin was born as Mary Eva Gourley on January 9, 1879, in Lawrence, Massachusetts. Her name was legally changed to Mary Eva Gourley Roe on March 18, 1890, when she was adopted by Syracuse University mathematics professor Edward Drake Roe, Jr.

She grew up in Cambridge, Massachusetts, and began to write at a young age. Her first story won a prize from a Boston newspaper when she was 8 years old. In 1905, she graduated from Syracuse University with a Bachelor of Philosophy. She married Edwin Hall Gaggin, an architect, on January 11, 1911. She had a child, named John Bridge Gaggin, that died on the day of his birth on July 23, 1919.

In 1939, The Viking Press published her book An Ear for Uncle Emil, which was about a Swiss girl and her doll. Kate Seredy illustrated 83 drawings for the book. In 1941, Viking Press published her book Down Ryton Water about Pilgrims from the Mayflower ship. The book contained drawings by Elmer Hader. Gaggin's book Down Ryton Water was awarded a Newbery Honor in 1942.

Gaggin died on May 7, 1966, at her home.

== Works ==
- Jolly Animals (c. 1930)
- An Ear for Uncle Emil (1939), illustrated by Kate Seredy
- Down Ryton Water (1941)
- All Those Buckles (c. 1945), illustrated by Mildred Cloete
