= Genevieve Foster =

American children's writer

- Born: April 13, 1893; Oswego, New York
- Died: August 30, 1979 (aged 86); Westport, Connecticut, USA
- Writing career
- Genre: Children's literature

Genevieve Stump Foster (April 13, 1893 – August 30, 1979) (Note: Some sources report date of death as August 30, 1979, some report September 17, 1979) was an American children's writer who illustrated most of her own books. She was one runner-up for the annual Newbery Medal four times, one of four writers to do so.

== Biography ==
=== Childhood and education ===
Foster was born in Oswego, New York, to John William Stump, a science teacher, and Jessie Starin Stump. A year after she was born her father died, and her mother moved with Genevieve, an only child, to live with her parents in Whitewater, Wisconsin, where she spent most of her childhood. Foster cited the Wisconsin home and her grandmother as early influences. When she was 13, her drawing teacher recommended she attend art school after finishing high school. She attended Rockford College from 1911 to 1912 and later graduated from the University of Wisconsin in 1915. Still eager to draw, she then attended Chicago Academy of Fine Arts from 1916–1917.

=== Professional career ===
Foster began her career as a commercial artist, illustrator, and advertiser. She greatly reduced the amount of her work when she married Orrington C. Foster, an engineer, on June 5, 1922. After 5 months living in the woods, they moved to Chicago, Illinois. They had two children, Orrington Jr (known as Tony) in 1924 and Joanna in 1928. From 1930-1938 she significantly increased the amount of her work, primarily as an illustrator for children's stories. In 1933 they moved to Evanston, Illinois. Foster was confused by the way history was taught in school and college and early in her career she decided to try to find a way to write history books both children and their parents could enjoy. She credits her daughter with inspiring her creative method. While they were watching the 1934 film The Rise of Catherine the Great, Joanna noticed Catherine's clothes were similar to those worn by Americans during the time of George Washington. It occurred to Foster to write about history in a "horizontal" vice "vertical" fashion, i.e., that national histories should not be taught in isolation from one another. She said that the way history was traditionally taught was "about as dull and unsatisfying, as a play might be, if only one character appeared upon the stage, while the others faintly mumbled their lines in the wings, out of sight of the audience." She was at the forefront of this new method of historical writing, which viewed history as a cross section of intertwined events and looked at a person in their worldwide historical context. In her books, she integrated global historical events into the telling of a person's life. Her purpose was to make historical figures "alive for children". For example, her first historical book, George Washington's World, showed how the French Revolution, American Revolution, and British imperialism were intertwined and affected Washington's life. During her career she wrote 19 nonfiction children's books. Foster traveled extensively and most of her books were translated into 12–15 languages and were distributed by the U. S. State Department.

=== Death and legacy ===
Foster died in Westport, Connecticut. Her papers are held at the University of Oregon Libraries, Special Collections & University Archives; and University of Minnesota Library, the Children's Literature Research Collections. Many of her books are still in print and some are used as textbooks, particularly in the homeschooling market. Her daughter, Joanna, worked as an editor of children's books and wrote two youth books of her own, Pete's Puddle (1950) and Dogs Working for People (1972).

== Selected works ==
=== Author ===
- George Washington's World (1941) (NH 1942)
- Abraham Lincoln's World 1809-1865 (1944) (NH 1945)
- Augustus Caesar's World: A Story of Ideas and Events from B.C. 44 to 14 A.D. (1947)
- George Washington (1949) (NH 1950)
- Abraham Lincoln (1950)
- Andrew Jackson (1951)
- Birthdays of Freedom, Vol. 1 (1952) (NH 1953)
- Birthdays of Freedom, Vol. 2 (1957) (one volume edition 1973)
- Theodore Roosevelt (1954)
- When and Where in Italy, A Passport to Yesterday for Readers and Travelers of Today (1955)
- The World of Captain John Smith (1959)
- The World of Columbus and Sons (1965)
- Year of the Pilgrims, 1620 (1969)
- Year of Columbus, 1492 (1969)
- Year of Lincoln, 1861 (1970)
- Year of Independence, 1776 (1970)
- The World of William Penn (1973)
- Year of the Horseless Carriage, 1801 (1975)
- Year of the Flying Machine, 1903 (1977)

NH: Four children's books by Eaton were among the annual Newbery Medal runners-up, now called Newbery Honor Books.

=== Illustrated only ===
- Boyhood Adventures of Our Presidents, by Frances Cavanah
- Children of the White House, by Frances Cavanah
- Pioneer Girl, The Early Life of Frances Willard, by Clara Ingram Judson
- The Strange Pettingill Puzzle, Two Mysteries for Boys and Girls, by Augusta Huiell Seaman
