= The Egg Tree =

1950 picture book by Katherine Milhous

- Author: Katherine Milhous
- Illustrator: Katherine Milhous
- Genre: Children's picture book
- Publisher: Scribner
- Publication date: 1950
- Publication place: United States
- ISBN: 0-689-71568-4
- OCLC: 23733701
- Dewey Decimal: [E] 20
- LC Class: PZ7.M596 Ef 1992

The Egg Tree is a 1950 book by Katherine Milhous that won the 1951 Caldecott Medal. It is based on the author's family tradition and tells the classic tale of a Pennsylvania Dutch Easter, with its main characters being Katy and Carl. One day, near Easter, they look for Easter eggs and found eggs that their grandmother had painted on a tree. They are interested, so they ask their grandmother about the eggs. They eventually create one, and it becomes a big success the next Easter.

== Description ==
The book is illustrated, with the image of a rooster blowing a horn standing on a decorated Easter egg on the cover of the book. The illustration goes on through the book referencing the Pennsylvania Dutch traditions of art.

== Plot ==
The book tells the story of two children named Katy and Carl. They are going to their grandmothers farm in Red Hills, Pennsylvania. This is the first time the children have the opportunity to spend Easter with their relatives from this part of the country, so they get to meet four of their cousins. The next morning the children wake up early to participate in the Easter egg hunt.

Katy has trouble finding the eggs in this new and unexplored environment, so she decides to explore inside the house. In the attic looking around Katy finds six beautifully painted eggs that she takes to her grandmother immediately. The grandmother expresses her joy by saying, "Katy may not have found the most eggs, but she found the most beautiful eggs."

Then the grandmother decides to decorate a tree with the eggs using them as an ornament. All the kids get inspired because of Katy's discovery and the grandmother's joy so they all decide to put special emphasis on their own decoration of the eggs. They decorated a large tree, and the next year one that was even larger.

== Reception ==
Kirkus Reviews wrote, "This happy tale ... is enlivened by bright four colored illustrations and black and white decorations as spontaneous and colorful as a sunburst. The story is simple and charming" while Horn Book stated, "Librarians and teachers will give a warm welcome", and concluded, "Katherine Milhous’ illustrations are some of her best."

Awards
Preceded by Song of the Swallows	Caldecott Medal recipient 1951	Succeeded by Finders Keepers
