= Lois Maloy =

American illustrator (1902–1988)

- Born: November 19, 1902; Cleveland, Ohio, U.S.
- Died: May 15, 1988 (aged 85); Lake Forest, California, U.S.
- Occupation: Illustrator
- Years active: 1935–1965
- Spouse: John P. Maloy (m. 1930; died 1981)
- Children: 2

Lois Mansfield MacBain Maloy (née MacBain; November 19, 1902 – May 15, 1988) was an American illustrator of children’s books.

== Early life ==
Maloy was born Lois Mansfield MacBain in 1902 in Cleveland, Ohio, to James MacBain, a carpenter, and Mabel MacBain (née Gyles). Her grandfather served in the Union Army during the American Civil War and was wounded at the Battle of Cold Harbor in 1864. Maloy grew up in Buffalo, New York and attended the Buffalo School of Fine and Applied Arts. She loved to draw from her early childhood. She went to New York City for a job as an art teacher, studying at the Grand Central School of Art in Manhattan. She then went on to pursue a solo career.

== Career ==
Lois Maloy illustrated a number of books during her career. Her first book, published in 1935 by Charles Scribner's Sons, was Arabella of the Merry-Go Round, which was originally written for her three-year-old son Owen. It was well-received by the public, The Vancouver Sun deeming it "good-natured madness." Her second book, coauthored with Alice Dalgliesh, was also met with critical acclaim. Titled Long Live The King, it was published in 1937, just before the coronation of King George VI and Queen Elizabeth of the United Kingdom.

By 1939, Maloy was living in Scarsdale, New York, where she had a studio where she worked on her illustrations. She partnered with Charles Scribner's Sons to illustrate books written by editors at the company. In 1954, selections of Maloy’s artwork were viewed at an exhibition at Wellman Hall in Springfield, Massachusetts.

In 1956, she was "recruited" by educational authorities in Virginia to illustrate a new book about the history of the state of Virginia, from the Civil War to the present. She traveled around Virginia to study the land and get information for her drawings. The product of this, a book called Virginia History, was intended as a way for children to be more interested in their state's history. A sequel, Virginia’s History and Geography, was published in 1965.

== Personal life and death ==
Maloy married John Maloy, an engineer, in 1930 in New York City. They lived in the New York metropolitan area, where they raised two children: John Owen (called Owen) and Mary Lois. Later, they moved to Arizona, where Maloy’s husband died in 1981.

Lois Maloy died in 1988 in Lake Forest, California, at the age of 85.

== Selected works ==
- Arabella of the Merry-Go-Round, Charles Scribner’s Sons, 1935
- Long Live The King, C. Scribner’s Sons, written by Alice Dalgliesh, 1937
- Polly, Prue & Penny, Lothrop, Lee and Shepard Company, 1937
- America Begins; The Story of Finding the New World, written by Alice Dalgliesh, 1938
- The Vale Family, written by Helen Hill and Violet Maxwell, 1939
- Wooden Shoes in America, written by Alice Dalgliesh, 1940
- The Star Wish, 1940
- Saint George and the Dragon, edited by Alice Dalgliesh, 1941
- Swift Thunder of the Prairie; An American Adventure, 1942
- Yankee Sails to China; An American Adventure, 1943
- Toby’s House, 1946
- Tea Party in Plumpudding Street, 1946
- Virginia History, written by Raymond C. Dingledine, 1956
- Virginia History and Geography, Including: Our Home, Virginia and the World, written by Lena Barksdale, Marion Nesbitt Jr., and Raymond Dingledine, 1965
- Ten Minus Nine Equals Joanie, written by Clarice Pont, 1965
