= Christine Goutiere Weston =

American novelist

Christine Weston
- Born: August 31, 1903; Unnao, Uttar Pradesh, British India
- Died: May 4, 1989 (aged 85); Bangor, Maine, U.S.
- Spouse(s): Robert Weston (div. 1951), later remarried
- Writing career
- Years active: 1940s-1980s
- Period: 20th century
- Genres: Psychological novel, fiction, children's literature, non-fiction
- Notable awards: Guggenheim Fellowship (1940), Newbery Honor (1946)

Christine de Marquetiere Goutiere Weston (31 August 1903 – 4 May 1989) was an India-born American fiction writer.

== Life ==
She was born in Unnao, now in Uttar Pradesh, British India, the daughter of George Henry Goutière, a British indigo planter of French descent, and Alice Luard Wintle, also born in British India. In 1923 she married American businessman Robert Weston, and moved with him to the United States, where she began a writing career.

Weston's second novel, The Devil's Foot (1942), was described by Dawn Powell as handling "an American story with the dexterity and subtlety of Henry James." Indigo (1943), set in India, is generally considered her best work and made her reputation as a psychological novelist. The Dark Wood (1946) also received good reviews and the rights were bought by Twentieth-Century Fox. The film was cast in 1946 with Maureen O'Hara and Tyrone Power in the lead roles, and Otto Preminger directing, but was never produced.

Weston also wrote The World is a Bridge (1950) and two non-fiction books about Ceylon and Afghanistan. In total she produced 10 novels, over 30 short stories (mostly for New York City magazines), 2 non-fiction books, and Bhimsa, the Dancing Bear (1945), a 1946 Newbery Honor children's book.

Weston divorced her husband in 1951 but later remarried. At the time of the divorce they were living in Castine, Maine, and she wrote some of her later fiction about New England. She spent the later part of her life in Bangor, Maine.

Weston won a Guggenheim Fellowship in 1940.

== Works ==
=== Novels ===
- Be Thou the Bride (1940)
- The Devil's Foot (1942)
- Indigo (1943)
- The Dark Wood (1946)
- The World Is a Bridge (1950)
- The Wise Children (1957)
- The Hoopoe (1970)

=== Short fiction ===
- There and Then: Stories of India (1947)

=== Juvenile ===
- Bhimsa, the Dancing Bear (1945)

=== Nonfiction ===
- Ceylon: A World Background Book (1960)
- Afghanistan: A World Background Book (1962)

=== Short stories ===
Title	Publication	Collected in
"Roshan"	The New Yorker (September 11, 1943)	There and Then
"The Last Room"	New Mexico Quarterly Review 13.3 (Autumn 1943)	-
"The Mangoes Are Gone"	The New Yorker (January 1, 1944)	There and Then
"Raziya"	Tomorrow (February 1944)	There and Then
"The Mud Horse"	The New Yorker (February 5, 1944)	There and Then
"When Bulgaria Fell"	The New Yorker (March 4, 1944)	There and Then
"Mimosa"	The New Yorker (June 17, 1944)	There and Then
"A Game of Halma"	The New Yorker (July 15, 1944)	There and Then
"Be Still, She Sleeps"	The New Yorker (October 7, 1944)	There and Then
"River Scene"	The New Yorker (November 4, 1944)	There and Then
"The Ball"	The New Yorker (January 13, 1945)	There and Then
"Fine Oranges"	Tomorrow (March 1945)	-
"Alexander"	The New Yorker (April 14, 1945)	There and Then
"The Atlas Moth"	The New Yorker (July 21, 1945)	There and Then
"The Devil Has the Moon"	The New Yorker (August 18, 1945)	There and Then
"The Emerald Dove"	Tomorrow (September 1945)	There and Then
"Infernal Little Beast"	The New Yorker (November 17, 1945)	There and Then
"Java Coolie"	The New Yorker (May 3, 1947)	-
"Her Bed Is India"	The New Yorker (May 31, 1947)	-
"Capital City, 1947"	The New Yorker (August 16, 1947)	-
"Banog"	The New Yorker (September 13, 1947)	-
"Let Me Stay"	The New Yorker (February 28, 1948)	-
"After Akbar"	The New Yorker (March 20, 1948)	-
"The Last Shall Be the First"	The New Yorker (August 21, 1948)	-
"No Terra Firma"	The New Yorker (June 3, 1950)	-
"Bear Hunt in Oriasa"	The New Yorker (September 23, 1950)	-
"The Second Pasture"	Collier's (February 3, 1951)	-
"Loud Sing Cuckoo"	Mademoiselle (November 1951)	-
"A Day in Spring"	The New Yorker (May 5, 1951)	-
"The Forest of the Night"	The New Yorker (November 22, 1952)	-
"A Man Has No Choice"	The New Yorker (January 10, 1953)	-
"The Dream of Part'n Deen"	Collier's (March 7, 1953)	-
"The Man in Gray"	Virginia Quarterly Review 29.3 (Summer 1953)	-
"The Stealers"	The New Yorker (October 17, 1953)	-
"The Jhula"	The New Yorker (September 11, 1954)	-
"On the Sindh River"	The New Yorker (May 21, 1955)	-
"Four Annas"	Virginia Quarterly Review 31.3 (Summer 1955)	-
"Mr. Chandra's Five-Year Plan"	Collier's (November 9, 1956)	-
"The Cub"	Harper's (September 1957)	-
"The Roses of Mazar"	The New Yorker (May 14, 1960)	-
"Summer Is Another Country"	Harper's (July 1961)	-
"The First Frost"	Redbook (December 1965)	-
"The Magic Time"	McCall's (August 1970)	from The Hoopoe
