= Alfred Powell Morgan =

American electrical engineer

Alfred Powell 'Skipper' Morgan (1889–1972) was an electrical engineer, inventor of radio and mechanical devices, and author of technical and children's books from the U.S. state of New Jersey.

== Life and career ==
Originally from Upper Montclair, New Jersey, Morgan attended the Massachusetts Institute of Technology and was a radio manufacturer for many years. He was a partner of Adams Morgan, an electronics company founded in around 1910 that distributed radio construction kits. Paul Forman Godley, developer of the Paragon Receivers, joined in 1915 as the third partner. The company employed 50-100 staff in 1922/23. Due to economic problems, production was halted at the end of 1927.

== Writing ==
Morgan wrote many books on radio and electronics. He wrote a series of books on the subject for young people, including the Boys First, Second, Third & Fourth Book Of Radio And Electronics. Morgan had four sons, which is why his books were originally written for boys, but editions from the 1970s were edited for boys and girls. Some of the projects described in his books cannot be built easily today because the parts are difficult to find, but many are based on simple parts and hand tools that can be found at a hardware or electronic supply store. Safety standards have also improved in the last hundred years, so some of the projects described would now be considered risky. Some of the books are available in reprints including The Boy Electrician (Lindsay Publications).

Morgan also edited a monthly column on electricity and mechanics in The Boys' Magazine.

== US patents ==
- 58,808 - Design for an instrument-mount for radio panel (August 30, 1921)
- 60,362 - Design for an instrument-mount for radio panel (February 7, 1922)
- 1,459,070 - Rheostat (June 19, 1923)

== Selected works ==
Chemistry

- Adventures in Electrochemistry (New York: Scribner, c.1977)
- First Chemistry Book for Boys and Girls (New York: Scribner, 1950)
- First Chemistry Book for Boys and Girls (New York: Scribner, 1962)
- First Chemistry Book for Boys and Girls (New York: Scribner, c.1977)
- Simple Chemical Experiments (D. Appleton-Century, 1941)

Electronics

- "A High-Power Wireless Equipment", 15-part series published in Popular Electricity magazine 1910-1911 (Ref: ISBN 0-917914-95-3 1988)
- Wireless Telegraph Construction For Amateurs, Third Edition (New York: D. Van Nostrand Company, 1914)
- Wireless Construction and Installation for Beginners, Second Edition (New York: Cole & Morgan, 1916) (Art and Sciences - No. 5)
- The Boy Electrician (1913 copyright), a practical introduction to electricity and magnetism. This book was originally reviewed tongue-in-cheek as "a menance to the business of neighbourhood electrician, for it strives to teach the average boy all sorts of things his mother would like to have done about the house".
- A First Electrical Book for Boys (New York: Scribner, 1951)
- A First Electrical Book for Boys (New York: Scribner, c.1963)
- First Book of Radio and Electronics (New York: Scribner, c.1977)
- The Boy Electrician (New York: Lothrop, Lee & Shepard Co., 1948)
- The Boys' First Book of Radio and Electronics (New York: Scribner, 1954)
- The Boys' Second Book of Radio and Electronics (New York: Scribner, 1957)
- The Boys' Third Book of Radio and Electronics (New York: Scribner, 1962)
- The Boys' Fourth Book of Radio and Electronics, an introduction to solid state physics, semiconductors, and transistors. (New York: Scribner, 1969)
- The pageant of Electricity (New York, London: d. Appleton-Century company inc., 1939)
- Things a Boy Can Do with Electricity (New York, London: C. Scribner's sons ltd., 1938)
- Getting Acquainted with Electricity (New York, London: D. Appleton-Century company inc., c.1942)

Pets

- An Aquarium Book for Boys and Girls (New York, London: C. Scribner's Sons ltd., 1936)
- A pet book for boys and girls (New York: C. Scribner's, 1949)
- A Pet Book for Boys and Girls (New York: Charles Scribner's, 1951)
- Tropical Fishes and Home Aquaria : A practical guide to a fascinating hobby (New York: C. Scribner, 1953, c.1935)

Tools / Misc

- Boy's Book of Engines, Motors and Turbines (Scribner, 1946)
- Boys' Book of Science and Construction (New York: Lothrop, Lee & Shepard Co., 1948)
- How to Build a 20-foot Bi-plane Glider: a practical handbook on the construction of a bi-plane gliding machine (New York: Spon & Chamberlain, 1909)
- The Boys' Book of Engines, Motors & Turbines, illustrated by the author (New York: Charles Scribner Sons, 1946)
- Tools and How to Use Them for Woodworking and Metal Working (New York: Grosset & Dunlap, 1948)
- How to Use Tools (New York: Arco, 1955)

== See also ==
- CK722
