= Song of the Swallows =

1949 picture book by Leo Politi

- Song of the Swallows
- Author: Leo Politi
- Illustrator: Leo Politi
- Cover artist: Politi
- Genre: Children's book
- Publisher: Scribner
- Publication date: 1949
- Publication place: United States
- Media type: Print

Song of the Swallows is a children's book written and illustrated by Leo Politi. Published by Scribner, it was the recipient of the Caldecott Medal for illustration in 1950.

== Plot ==
The book tells the story of Juan who lives in an adobe house located near Mission San Juan Capistrano. It isn't too far from the school. Juan is good friends with Julian who's an old bell ringer and a gardener who isn't sure about the swallows' migration to a peaceful island in the summer. Julian explains to Juan how this beautiful mission was founded by Saint Francis and his brothers, especially Father Junipero Serra. He tells him of his misgivings about the swallows' migration. Juan and Julian really love the swallows (las golondrinas) and doesn't want them to leave Capistrano. He and his friend feed tiny pieces of bread that Julian saves in his pockets. Plenty of birds appear in the garden, including hummingbirds, sparrows, white doves and especially swallows. In the spring, he plants a garden on his vacation time. There's nothing more exciting to see the family of swallows nesting in the protagonists' garden.

One of the children tells the other the journey the swallows make all the way from South America to spend the summer in California during St. Joseph's Day to watch a family of swallows migrate to an island. On Saint Joseph's Day, Juan's dream comes true, which gets to the point where Juan and Julian alert everyone in the village by ringing the mission bells together. The swallow family gets to nest in the arches of the mission before summer begins.

One day, a baby swallow falls out of the nest and Juan witnesses the shock of the situation with his feathered friends. His/her parents don't reject the chick at all after Juan saved him/her. Everyone gets ready for Saint Joseph's Day by dressing up and celebrating before summer arrives. Juan sings "Las Golondrinas" before he plants his own garden for the swallows to nest at during his vacation time.

On Saint Joseph's Day, the children sing "The Swallow Song" together while they join Juan in the garden. Juan returns to his adobe house and observes the migration.

Awards
Preceded by The Big Snow	Caldecott Medal recipient 1950	Succeeded by The Egg Tree
