= Etco =

ETCO, Inc.
- Type: Private
- Industry: Manufacturing
- Founded: 1947
- Headquarters: Bradenton, Florida, US
- Area served: Worldwide
- Key people: David Dunn (Chairman)
- Products: precision metal stampings (both commodity & customized), ignition components, silicone components assembly equipment
- Number of employees: 250 (2011)
- Website: etco.com

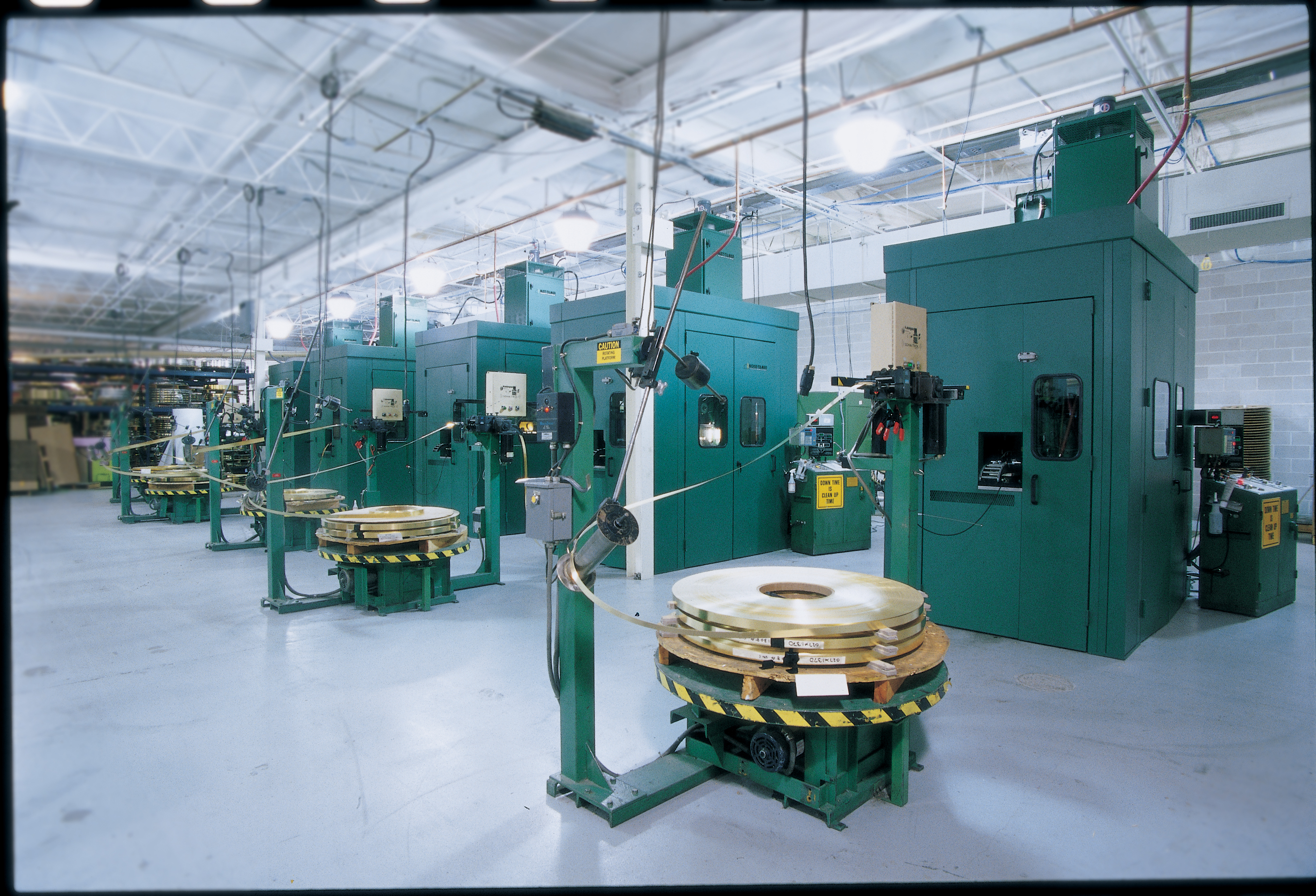

ETCO, Incorporated is a privately held, American Company based in Bradenton, Florida. Founded in 1947, it is now one of the oldest privately held manufacturing corporations in the United States. Some of ETCO's major areas of operation include manufacturing of wall socket, auto parts, custom metal parts, precision metal stampings for appliances and other metal based products. In 2011, it merged operations of its North and South divisions while maintaining two autonomous manufacturing locations based in Warwick, Rhode Island, and Bradenton, Florida.

ETCO's products can be found in electronic home appliances sold by several major appliance manufacturers. The products can also be found in cars sold by automotive manufacturers as well as medical and telecommunications companies.

ETCO remains a family-owned business, as descendants of the founder (from the Dunn Family) own 100% of the company. As a result, most of its growth has been due to reinvestment of the company's own earnings rather than public financing.

== History ==
ETCO Incorporated was founded in 1947 as Electric Terminal Corporation by Joe Dunn in Warwick, Rhode Island. Years later, his son David Dunn purchased a majority stake in the company and sought to build several divisions; successfully integrating the Zero Defects process in its manufacturing operations. The company grew throughout the 70s, 80s and 90s being awarded over 30 manufacturing process patents and producing nearly half of all plug blades manufactured in the US in 2011.

ETCO recently celebrated its 75th year Anniversary and David Dunn (owner) summarized the company's lengthy history for Wire Harness News.

== Products and Services ==
Standard Products

Quick disconnects, ring terminals, spade terminals, male disconnects, pins, contacts and receptacles.

Cord Products

Cord set blades, ground pins, blade/pin assembled product for power cord termination and molding. Assembled cord set components for mounting on printed circuit boards. Hospital Grade Blades and Pins required for hospital power supply cord applications. UL/CSA

Insulated Products

Fully insulated terminals (150 degree C; Fire Retardant) UL/CSA

Automotive Products

Spark plug terminals and spark plug boots. Battery cable terminals: heavy duty ring terminals and stamped top post battery terminals and equipment to terminate to cable.

Special Terminals and Stampings

Design or special stamping either on reel or loose piece, tool the stamping die and the necessary application equipment.

9001:2015; IATF 16949:2016; RoHS compliant.

== Industries ==
Agriculture/Off-Highway, Aircraft Aerospace, Automotive After Market, Automotive OEM, Battery, Construction, Health and Medical, Marine, Lighting, Appliance/Home Products, Communications, Electronics, Telecommunications, Truck, and HVAC industries.

== Zero Defects Policy ==
ETCO's stated manufacturing objective is zero defects in the course of parts production. The products manufactured at ETCO's plants go through a rigorous quality assurance process including machine review and visual inspection by hand to ensure that it adheres to the zero defect principle of Philip B. Crosby. Relying on this Quality Management principle, ETCO's management contends that it has been able to implement methodologies that have led to savings throughout the products manufacturing lifecycle. Arguments exist that oppose the Zero Defects Policy including W. Edwards Deming who stated that the philosophy is more a fad and would lose favor. Dr. Deming stressed the importance of establishing a level of variation, or anomalies, acceptable to the recipient (or customer) in the next phase of a process. Often, some defects are quite acceptable, and efforts to remove all defects would be an excessive waste of time and money. Another criticism leveled at the Zero Defect manufacturing philosophy is the cost inherent with implementing it versus the benefits achieved post-implementation.

== Coil on Plug Research ==
ETCO released a technical report detailing results of comparative testing conducted at their R&D facility. This report titled “Under the Boot” was published after a series of consumer complaints, research and articles involving Coil on Plug ignition systems. There were also Technical Service Bulletins (TSBs) issued by automobile manufacturers from automotive manufacturers including Acura/Honda that caused the company to release the white paper on this research. The main focus of the research looked at the spring-like connection devices. The connection devices used to supply the current's path from coil to plug were not as robust as the "mated fit" terminal to terminal connections required on wired ignition systems. These Coil on Plug devices do not have the retention values demanded by SAE ( Society Automotive Engineers ) Standard J2032 3.2.1 for High Voltage Ignition cable assemblies. Proponents of Coil on Plug technology cite cost and ease of use as primary advantages when compared to standard wire assemblies.

== Countries of Operation ==
=== Asia Pacific ===
Australia, China, India, Indonesia, Japan, Malaysia, Pakistan, Philippines, South Korea, Singapore, Sri Lanka, Taiwan, Thailand, Vietnam

=== Europe ===
Austria, Belgium, Denmark, Finland, France, Germany, Greece, Hungary, Ireland, Italy, Netherlands, Poland, Portugal, Romania, Russian Federation, Spain, Sweden, Switzerland, Turkey, Ukraine, United Kingdom

=== North America ===
Canada, Mexico, United States of America

=== South America ===
Argentina, Bolivia, Brazil, Chile, Colombia, Paraguay, Peru, Uruguay, Venezuela
