= Bhimsa, the Dancing Bear =

1945 children's book by Christine Weston

- First edition
- Author: Christine Weston
- Illustrator: Roger Duvoisin
- Language: English
- Genre: Children's literature / advenutre
- Publisher: Scribner
- Publication date: October 1, 1945
- Publication place: United States

Bhimsa, the Dancing Bear is a 1945 children's novel written by Christine Weston and illustrated by Roger Duvoisin. Set in contemporary India, it follows the adventures of two boys, David and Gopali, as they roam the country with a dancing bear.

== Reception ==
The novel was a Newbery Honor recipient in 1946. Kirkus Reviews called it "A bit out of this world atmosphere and occasionally moralizing – but in all a satisfactory adventure story" and "The Roger Duvoisin pictures in two colors are sure passport to charm." The Elementary English Review called it authentic, and Elementary English said it was an "authentic portrayal of life in India".
