= Birthdays of Freedom =

Birthdays of Freedom is a children's history book written and illustrated by Genevieve Foster. The book was originally published in two volumes, Book One being first published in 1952, and Book Two in 1957. Book One was a Newbery Honor recipient in 1953.

The combined book has been given the subtitle From Early Man to July 4, 1776. Book One has the subtitle From Early Egypt to the Fall of Rome, with the additional cover text America's Heritage from the Ancient World. Book Two has the subtitle From the Fall of Rome to July 4, 1776.

Genevieve Foster is known for her horizontal history, putting a historical figure in context. In this series she follows the inventions, discoveries, people, and events that can all be seen as significant precursors of the signing of the Declaration of Independence in 1776, the event celebrated by America's Independence Day on July 4.
