= USS Maloy =

Buckley-class destroyer escort

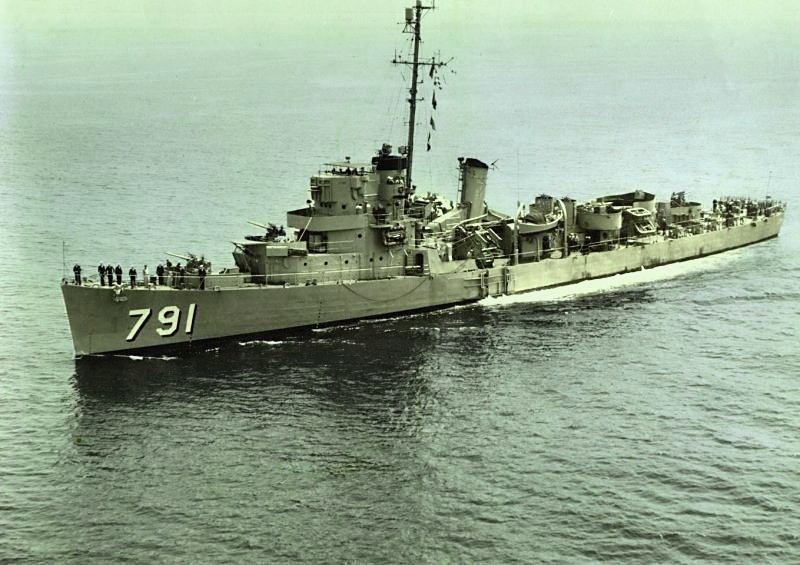
- USS Maloy

History

United States
- Name: USS Maloy
- Namesake: Thomas Joel Maloy
- Builder: Consolidated Steel Corporation, Orange, Texas
- Laid down: 10 May 1943
- Launched: 18 August 1943
- Commissioned: 13 December 1943
- Decommissioned: 28 May 1965
- Reclassified: EDE-791, 14 August 1946
- Stricken: 1 June 1965
- Honors and awards: 1 battle star (World War II)
- Fate: Sold for scrapping, 11 March 1966

General characteristics
- Class & type: Buckley-class destroyer escort
- Displacement: 1,400 long tons (1,422 t) standard; 1,673 long tons (1,700 t) full load
- Length: 306 ft (93 m)
- Beam: 37 ft (11 m)
- Draft: 13 ft 6 in (4.11 m)
- Propulsion: Turbo-electric drive, 12,000 shp (8.9 MW); 2 shafts
- Speed: 24 knots (44 km/h; 28 mph)
- Complement: 186
- Armament: 3 × 3"/50 caliber guns; 1 × quad 1.1"/75 caliber gun; 8 × single 20 mm guns; 1 × triple 21 inch (533 mm) torpedo tubes; 8 × K-gun depth charge projectors; 2 × depth charge tracks

USS Maloy (DE-791/EDE-791), a Buckley-class destroyer escort of the United States Navy. The ship was named after Thomas Maloy, who was a sailor killed aboard the cruiser USS Atlanta during the Naval Battle of Guadalcanal in November 1942.

== Construction and commissioning ==
Maloy (DE-791) was laid down by Consolidated Steel Corporation in Orange, Texas, on 10 May 1943; launched on 18 August 1943, sponsored by Mrs. Thomas J. Maloy, widow of Chief Water Tender Maloy; and commissioned on 13 December 1943.

== Service history ==
=== World War II, 1943–1945 ===
Maloy spent her entire World War II service with the Atlantic Fleet. On her first assignment she escorted troop transports to the Panama Canal and screened an escort carrier back to the east coast. Then in early March 1944 she crossed the Atlantic to Northern Ireland, and until June conducted amphibious training along the English coast in preparation for the invasion of France.

On D-Day, 6 June 1944, Maloy supported operations off Omaha Beach in this hard-fought assault where naval gunfire support played a decisive role in victory. She continued to patrol off the Normandy coast and among the Channel Islands for the remainder of the war, raiding enemy shipping whenever possible. With the capitulation of Germany on 8 May 1945, she escorted the first convoy to re-enter Saint Peter Port, Guernsey, Channel Islands. The destroyer escort then returned to the United States, arriving on 18 June 1945.

=== Operational Development Force, 1946–1965 ===
The following May, Maloy commenced working for Operational Development Force, New London Detachment, and was redesignated EDE-791 on 14 August 1946. For the next 18 years, Maloy played a large role in the ever-changing Navy, primarily testing and evaluating experimental equipment in connection with various projects of the Underwater Sound Laboratory. While testing the new equipment, Maloy continued to fulfill regular duties, which included service as a school and training ship for the Fleet Sonar School at Key West, and participated in anti-submarine warfare, convoy, and other fleet exercises.

During this time she also successfully completed emergency assignments. At Portland, Maine, 11 November 1947 to 25 March 1948, Maloy provided electrical power for the city when, because of extreme drought conditions, local power companies could not draw on their normal power source, the lakes and rivers of the area. In May and June 1961, she cruised off the Dominican Republic to provide, if necessary, protection for American citizens during the revolution in that country. And the following year she provided support for the Cuban quarantine during the Cuban Missile Crisis of October–November. For the next two years, Maloy continued her test and evaluation assignments.

=== Decommissioning and sale ===
She decommissioned at Philadelphia, Pennsylvania, on 28 May 1965 and was struck from the Navy List on 1 June 1965. On 11 March 1966, she was sold to the North American Smelting Company of Wilmington, Delaware, for scrap.

== Awards ==
Maloy received one battle star for World War II service.
