= Abraham Lincoln's World =

- First Edition cover
- Author: Genevieve Foster
- Illustrator: Genevieve Foster
- Language: English
- Subject: American history
- Publisher: Scribner
- Publication date: 1944
- Publication place: United States
- Media type: Print (Paperback)
- Pages: 360
- ISBN: 978-1-893103-16-0
- Preceded by: George Washington's World

Abraham Lincoln's World is a children's history book by Genevieve Foster. Illustrated by the author, it was first published in 1944 and was a Newbery Honor recipient in 1945.

The book is a continuation of the author's George Washington's World (1941), starting where the earlier book finished, at the start of the nineteenth century. It shows events and conditions in the United States and around the world during the life of Abraham Lincoln, covering politics, business, the arts, and more.
