= William Lipkind =

American writer

William Lipkind (December 17, 1904, New York City – October 2, 1974) was an American writer most famous for his children's picture book collaborations with Nicholas Mordvinoff, under the pseudonym Will (jointly Nicolas and Will). Before his writing and illustrating career, he was already an established anthropologist, graduating from Columbia University in 1937. He earned a master's in English literature. His undergraduate degree was from City College of New York in 1927. His doctorate was in anthropology.

== Career ==
=== Writing ===
In 1947, he wrote Finders Keepers, published by Harcourt Brace and winner of the 1951 Caldecott Medal.

=== Anthropology ===
Beginning in 1939, Lipkind spent two years in Brazil studying two Indian tribes. His research resulted in a grammar and dictionary upon his return in the US. One publication was called Winnebago Grammar. It began as his dissertation at Columbia in 1944.

=== Teaching ===
Lipkind taught anthropology at New York University and at Hunter College, children's literature.

== Selected works ==
- Winnebago Grammar (linguistics, 1945)
- The Two Reds (1950)
- Finders Keepers (1951)
- Beginning Charm for the New Year (verse, 1951)
- Boy with a Harpoon (1952)
- Even Steven (1952)
- Boy of the Islands (1954)
- Professor Bull's Umbrella (1954)
- Perry the Imp 1956)
- The Magic Feather Duster (1958)
- Days to Remember: An Almanac (nonfiction, 1961)
- Russet and the Two Reds (1962)
- The Boy and the Forest (1964)
- Nubber Bear (1966)
