= Finders Keepers (Will and Nicholas children's book) =

Book

- First edition
- Author: William Lipkind
- Illustrator: Nicholas Mordvinoff
- Language: English
- Genre: children's books picture books
- Publisher: Harcourt Education
- Publication date: 1951
- Media type: Print (Hardback)

Finders Keepers (OCLC 182580986) is a book written by William Lipkind and illustrated by Nicholas Mordvinoff. Released by Harcourt, it was the recipient of the Caldecott Medal for illustration in 1952.

== Plot ==
Two dogs named Nap and Winkle find one bone and have difficulty deciding which of them owns it. Nap and Winkle begin to ask people who the bone belongs to. They ask a farmer, a goat, and a haircutter. A big dog takes the bone from both Nap and Winkle. After, getting the bone back from the big dog, Nap and Winkle discover that the bone belongs to both of them.

== Reviews ==
“Here is a perfect combination of rollicking story and pictures that have strength, life and humor in every line.”

Awards
Preceded by The Egg Tree	Caldecott Medal recipient 1952	Succeeded by The Biggest Bear
