= Berta and Elmer Hader =

American children's book writers and illustrators

Berta Hoerner Hader (August 1, 1890 – February 6, 1976) and Elmer Stanley Hader (September 7, 1889 – September 7, 1973) were an American couple who jointly illustrated more than 70 children's books, about half of which they also wrote. They won the annual Caldecott Medal for The Big Snow (1948), recognizing the year's "most distinguished American picture book for children". They received the Caldecott Honor Book Award for Cock-a-doodle-doo in 1940 and The Mighty Hunter in 1944.

== Biography ==
Berta Hoerner was born in San Pedro, Coahuila, Mexico, where her parents Albert and Adelaide unsuccessfully tried to grow cotton with Albert's brother. The family moved 100 km to the east, to the resort town of Parras, Mexico, when Berta was three, then soon-after to Amarillo, Texas, where her father ran a grocery store. Her father died when Berta was five, and the family soon moved to the northeast of the United States. Berta, perhaps inspired by her mother's colorful sketches of Mexican life, took art classes and read extensively while still in elementary school, winning literary and artistic prizes for her work. The family again moved in 1909, this time to Seattle, Washington. While Berta's mother worked for Charity Organization Society and Washington's Home, Berta continued painting and reading, and eventually attended the University of Washington School of Journalism (1909–1912). She also apprenticed at Western Engraving Company, where she learned printing design, fashion design, illustration, and printing skills. Berta's supervisor, Eva Shepard, moved to San Francisco, and handed over her fashion work in Seattle to Berta. When Ms. Shepard then took a position in New York, Ms. Shepard asked Berta to take over her free-lance fashion illustration business in San Francisco. Berta agreed and, to further her training, she spent the summer of 1915 attending art school in Carmel, California. In the fall she moved to San Francisco, took over Eva Shepard's fashion illustration work, and attended the California School of Design, where she studied from 1915 to 1918. While in San Francisco, Berta befriended Rose Wilder Lane (daughter of then-unknown writer Laura Ingalls Wilder), with whom she later rented a Telegraph Hill studio (1413 Montgomery Street). Berta first met her future husband Elmer at this studio. Berta had also befriended Bessie "Mother" Beatty during her time in San Francisco. After Ms. Beatty's adventures covering the Russian Revolution (The Red Heart of Russia, 1918), she invited Berta to New York City to do fashion design illustration for McCall's, where Ms. Beatty had become an editor.

Elmer Hader was born in Pajaro, California, but spent much of his youth in San Francisco. At the age of 16, as a member of the National Guard, he helped restore order to San Francisco after the 1906 earthquake. He worked briefly in a survey party up the American River (near Sacramento, California), then returned to San Francisco to work as a firefighter on the State Belt Railroad (a dock-side railroad that acted as a shuttle for goods and people), where his father worked as an engineer. Elmer used his earnings from this job to pay for his first term at California School of Design. He then obtained scholarships to finish at the school (1907–1910). Elmer was also involved in theatre, and was supported by two theatrical groups, including his time in Paris at the Académie Julian from 1912 to 1914. He was so successful at vaudeville routines in France and the U.S. (on the Pantages circuit), in which he would do a "Painting a Minute" act and, later, a living statue routine (in which individuals were made up to appear to be statues), that he considered dropping his long-term goal of becoming an artist. He did not. He returned to San Francisco, set up a studio in his parents attic, painted, taught art, and arranged exhibits. Elmer was the first artist showcased in a one-man one themed show at the Palace of Fine Arts. He was drafted into the U.S. Army and returned to France in 1918 as a member of the Camouflage Corps, just at the time that Berta was asked by Ms. Beatty to come to New York to work in fashion design illustration at McCalls.

When Elmer and Berta met in San Francisco, they had both been part of a broad network of artists and intellectuals in the area. They became good friends, and, rather than return to San Francisco, Elmer went directly to New York when he was demobilized in February 1919. Berta was working for McCall's. The two married in July of that year, then lived briefly in Greenwich Village. Seeking a more rustic setting, they left the city to rent the Lyall Cottage in Grand View-on-Hudson, a small town in rural Rockland County, New York on the west bank of the Hudson River. This would become the area where they would spend the rest of their lives. Their home, which took more than twenty years to construct, was largely built by the Haders and their friends, and the house became an art project in its own right. Elmer went so far as to extract the stones used to build the house from the earth himself. The Haders had a son in the early 1920s, Hamilton (named after the author Hamilton Williamson), who died from meningitis not long before he turned three. They retreated to a friend's home in Maine to grieve and heal. They returned to New York to continue work on their home and to continue their artistic careers contributing artwork to many magazines, creating broadsides, pamphlets, painting miniatures (Berta) and portraits (Elmer).

== Career ==
The two used their talents and Berta's connections to prepare children's sections for Good Housekeeping, McCall's, Pictorial Review, Asia, Century, and The Christian Science Monitor. They did pictures and cut-outs, often featuring children dressed in national costumes. In Berta and Elmer Hader's Picture Book of Mother Goose, the couple collated pen-and-ink and color drawings they had done for Monitor and Good Housekeeping to great acclaim. When the US Postal Service dis-allowed the sending of magazines with cut-out segments in 1926, the Haders switched gears, gaining a contract with MacMillan for a series of children's books. They began writing the stories for some of the books in this period. Demand for their product soared, and they worked incessantly from 1927 to 1931, illustrating, in some cases writing, producing, and helping to sell thirty-four titles. They stayed busy for the rest of their lives, producing another seventy or so books before they retired in 1964. One book in particular, Billy Butter (1936), so impressed writer John Steinbeck that he requested Elmer Hader do the cover to The Grapes of Wrath (1939). Hader eventually did covers for two other Steinbeck works, East of Eden (1952) and The Winter of Our Discontent (1961).

The Haders were early champions of conservation, animal protection, and pacifism. This made its way into their work, particularly with titles such as The Runaways (1956) and Two Is Company, Three's a Crowd (1965?). In the early 1950s, Berta became a community activist, ignited by the seemingly lost cause of having the location of the proposed Tappan Zee Bridge moved to a less sensitive area than its planned path through her village. Though The New York Times accused her of "blocking progress", the New York State Thruway Authority eventually relented, and the massive 4,88 km-long bridge was built several kilometers to the north at Nyack, where the bridge still stands today.

Berta and Elmer travelled extensively in Mexico, Jamaica, and the far northeast of the United States, some of which made its way into their work. 'The Story of Pancho and the Bull with the Crooked Tail" (1942), Jamaica Johnny (1943), and Tommy Thatcher Goes to Sea (1950) are all informed by their travels. Elmer died on his 84th birthday at his home in Grand-View-on-Hudson. Berta remained at the home until shortly before she died 1976 February 6 at the age of 85.

== Selected works ==
=== Author/illustrators ===
- "Happy Hours", 1927-1928, seven small picture books
- The Picture Book of Travel, 1928
- What'll You Do When You Grow Up? A Book for Very Young People Who haven't Made Up Their Minds, 1929
- Berta and Elmer Hader's Picture Book of Mother Goose, 1930
- Lion Cub: A Jungle Tale, 1931
- "Tooky: The story of a seal who joined the circus", 1931
- Midget and Bridget, 1934
- Billy Butter - The Tale of A Little Brown Goat, 1936
- Tommy Thatcher Goes to Sea, 1937
- Cricket: The Story of a Little Circus Pony, 1938
- Cock-a-Doodle Doo, 1939
- The Cat and the Kitten, 1940
- Little Town, 1941
- Pancho, 1942
- The Mighty Hunter, 1943
- The Little Stone House, 1944
- Rainbow's End, 1945
- The Skyrocket, 1946
- The Big Snow, 1948
- Little Appaloosa, 1949
- Squirrely of Willow Hill, 1950
- The Farmer in the Dell Hardcover, 1951
- The Friendly Phoebe, 1953
- Wish on the Moon, 1954
- Home on the Range: Jeremiah Jones and His Friend Little Bear in the Far West, 1955
- Ding Dong Bell, Pussy's in the Well, 1957
- Little Chip of Willow Hill, 1958
- Reindeer Trail - a Long Journey from Lapland to Alaska, 1959
- Mister Billy's Gun, 1960
- Quack Quack: The Story of a Little Wild Duck, 1961
- Little Antelope an Indian for a Day, 1962
- Snow in the City, 1963
- Two is Company, Three's a Crowd, 1965

=== Illustrators ===
- Baby Bear, by Hamilton Williamson, 1930
- Banana Tree, by Phillis Garrard, 1938
- Timothy Has Ideas, by Miriam E. Mason. Macmillan, 1943.
