= Nicholas Mordvinoff =

Nicolas Mordvinoff (September 27, 1911 Saint Petersburg, Russian Empire–May 5, 1973 Hampton, New Jersey, United States) was a Russian-born American artist who won the 1952 Caldecott Medal for U.S. picture book illustration, recognizing Finders Keepers, by William Lipkind. The collaborators used the pseudonym Nicolas and Will and had The Two Reds published by Harcourt in 1950.

One earlier work was William Standish Stone, Pépé was the saddest bird, Knopf, 1944
