= George Washington's World =

1941 book by Genevieve Foster

- First edition
- Author: Genevieve Foster
- Illustrator: Genevieve Foster
- Language: English
- Genre: Histor
- Publisher: Scribner
- Publication date: 1941
- Publication place: United States
- Pages: 348
- Followed by: Abraham Lincoln's World

George Washington's World is a 1941 children's history book by Genevieve Foster. The book explores the lives of famous people and events that occurred during the life of Washington, including the Seven Years' War, the ascension of Catherine the Great, the invention of the steam engine, and the writing of the Constitution of the United States. A follow-up book, Abraham Lincoln's World, was published in 1944.

== Reception ==
The book was a Newbery Honor recipient in 1942. The New York Times praised the book, calling it "an ambitious project, beautifully executed".
