= Deaths in May 1983 =

The following is a list of notable deaths in May 1983.

Entries for each day are listed alphabetically by surname. A typical entry lists information in the following sequence:

- Name, age, country of citizenship at birth, subsequent country of citizenship (if applicable), reason for notability, cause of death (if known), and reference.

== May 1983 ==
=== 4 ===
- Ruth Roche, 66, American writer and editor in the Golden Age of Comic Books, she started her career in 1940 as a writer at the Eisner-Iger Studio, a packager for Fiction House, she wrote such features as Phantom Lady, Senorita Rio, Sheena, Queen of the Jungle, Kaanga, and Camilla, in 1944, she created Kismet, Man of Fate, the first Muslim superhero
- Shūji Terayama, 47, Japanese avant-garde poet, dramatist, film director, and photographer, cirrhosis of the liver

=== 5 ===
- John Williams, 80, English actor, heart disease

=== 6 ===
- Ezra Jack Keats, 67, American children's writer and illustrator (The Snowy Day, Goggles!, Jennie's Hat), winning Caldecott Medal (1963), complications from a heart attack.

=== 7 ===
- Claire Myers Owens, 87, American author
- József Romhányi, 62, Hungarian screenwriter, poet, and translator

=== 8 ===
- John Fante, 74, American novelist, short story writer, and screenwriter

=== 9 ===
- Marjorie Beebe, 74, American actress

=== 14 ===
- Miguel Alemán Valdés, 83, Mexican politician, served as the President of Mexico from 1946 until 1952, his administration is credited with the Mexican Miracle of rapid industrialization
- Roger J. Traynor, 83, American lawyer and judge, served as the Chief Justice of California from 1964 until 1970, several of Traynor's decisions were credited with transforming California from a conservative and somewhat repressive state into a progressive, innovative jurisdiction in the forefront of American law

=== 15 ===
- Rodolfo Gucci, 70, Italian actor and entrepreneur, shareholder in his family's eponymous fashion house Gucci

=== 16 ===
- Will Ahern, 86, American vaudeville entertainer

=== 17 ===
- Jake Day, 90, American sculptor, photographer, naturalist and illustrator, designed the character of Bambi for the 1942 animated feature film Bambi.

=== 18 ===
- Frank Aiken, 85, Irish revolutionary and politician, served as the chief of staff of the Anti-Treaty IRA at the end of the Irish Civil War, later served as Tánaiste from 1965 to 1969, death from unspecified "natural causes"

=== 21 ===
- Gladys Blake, 73, American character actress
- Kenneth Clark, 79, British art historian, museum director and broadcaster, arteriosclerosis
- Boris Stepantsev, 53, Soviet animation director, animator, and book illustrator, he served as a vice-president of the International Animated Film Association (ASIFA) from 1972 until 1982 and as the creative director of the Multtelefilm animation department of the Studio Ekran from 1980 until 1983, heart failure

=== 22 ===
- John Barrett, 73, British actor
- Albert Claude, 83, Belgian American cell biologist and medical doctor, his collective works established the complex functional and structural properties of cells.

=== 23 ===
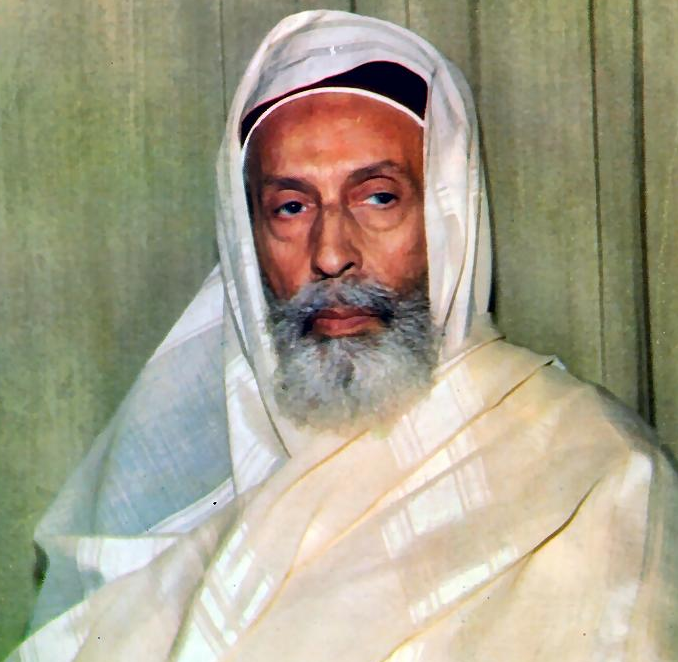
Idris of Libya

- George Bruns, 68, American film composer (The Love Bug, One Hundred and One Dalmatians, The Absent-Minded Professor), heart attack

=== 25 ===
- Cy Hungerford, 93, American editorial cartoonist, produced daily cartoons for the Pittsburgh Post-Gazette from 1927 until his retirement in 1977
- Idris of Libya, 93, he served as the only monarch of the short-lived Kingdom of Libya from 1951 until his deposition in 1969
- Kay Williams, 66, American actress, heart failure

=== 27 ===
- Lilita Bērziņa, 79, Latvian actress

=== 28 ===
- John C. Howard, 52, American film editor

=== 29 ===
- Arvīds Pelše, 84, Latvian politician and historian, Chairman of the Party Control Committee from 1966 until 1983, head of the "Pelše Commission" which investigated the assassination of Sergei Kirov, cardiac arrest

=== 31 ===
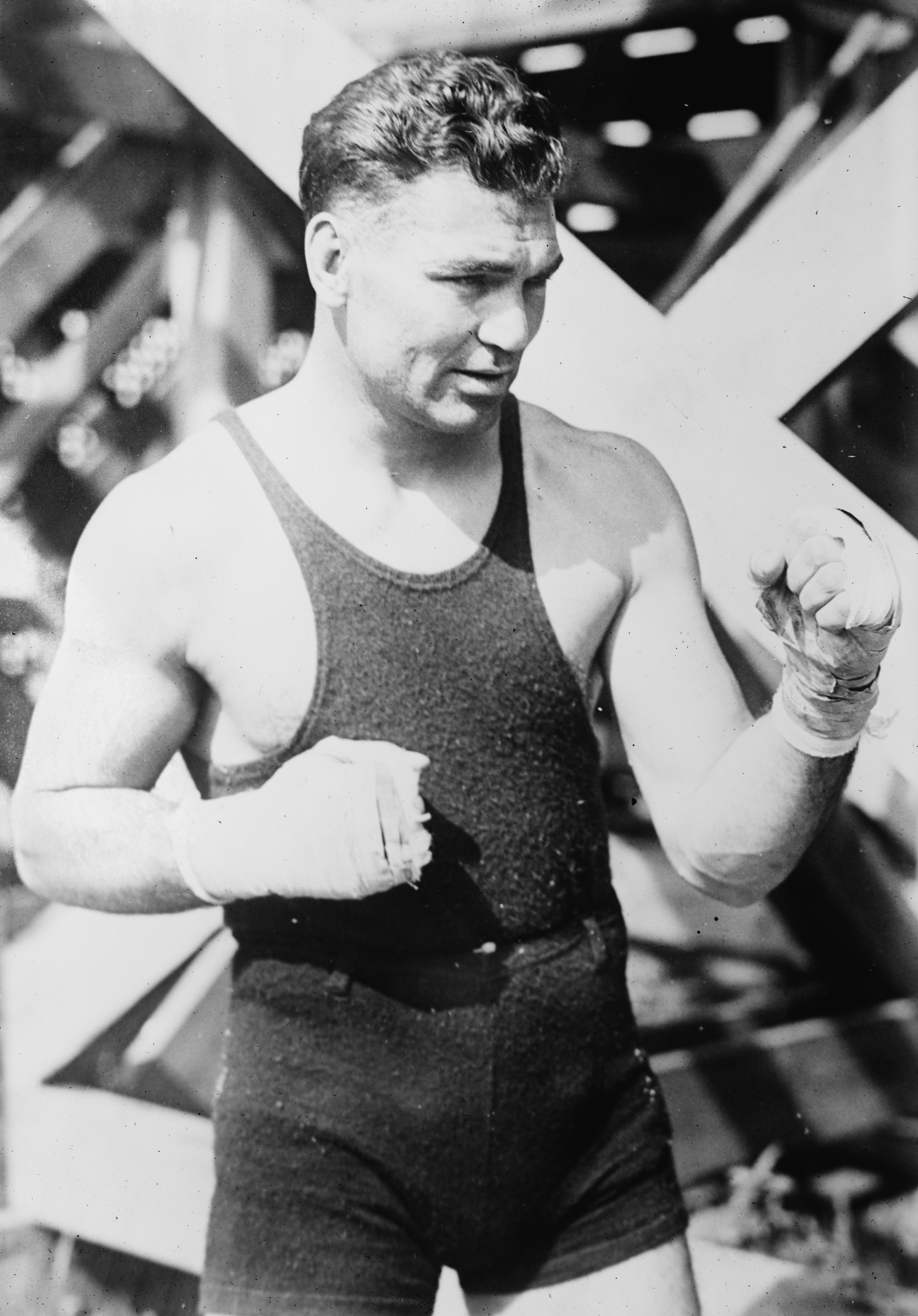
Jack Dempsey

- Jack Dempsey, 87, American boxer, world heavyweight champion from 1919 until 1926, heart failure

== Sources ==
- Lewis, Matthew, Frank Aiken's War, The Irish Revolution 1916–1923, UCD Press (Dublin 2014)
- Remeikis, Thomas: “A Latvian in the Politbureau: A Political Portrait of Arvids Pelše.” Lituanus 12:1 (1966) 81–84. ISSN 0024-5089
- Ridgely, Steven C.. "Japanese Counterculture: The Antiestablishment Art of Terayama Shuji", Univ of Minnesota Press (2011).
- Sorgenfrei, Carol Fisher. Unspeakable Acts: The Avant-garde Theatre of Terayama Shuji And Postwar Japan, University of Hawaii Press (2005).
- Stourton, James (2016). Kenneth Clark: Life, Art and Civilisation. London: Collins. ISBN 978-0-00-749341-8.
