= Keats's Neighborhood =

Book by Ezra Jack Keats

- Author: Ezra Jack Keats
- Illustrator: Ezra Jack Keats
- Genre: Children's picture book
- Publication date: 2002
- Publication place: United States
- Pages: 128
- ISBN: 0-67-0035866
- Dewey Decimal: [E]

Keats's Neighborhood is a 2002 children's picture book collecting several works by American author and illustrator Ezra Jack Keats. The collection brings together nine of his stories, including the 1963 Caldecott Medal-winning book The Snowy Day, Caldecott Honor book Goggles! and Peter's Chair. It includes an introduction to his work by Anita Silvey, a brief biography, and a section of comments on his legacy by other writers and illustrators.
