= TADA! Youth Theater =

Coordinates: 40.745957°N 73.988392°W

TADA! Youth Theater, founded in 1984, is a New York City theater company that runs several programs for children and young adults, including original mainstage productions and arts education programs.

== History ==
TADA! Youth Theater produces three original musical theater productions a year, offering pre-professional training through the Resident Youth Ensemble composed of over 80 New York City kids ages 8–18, in-school Arts Education residencies and after-school programs, and theater classes for kids of all ages taught by professional teaching artists and for which need-based scholarships are available.

The company has commissioned the creation of dozens of original musicals since founded in 1984, such as;

- 1984, 2000 - Little House of Cookies (adapted by Janine Nina Trevins, music and lyrics by Joel Gelpe);
- 2008 - Golly Gee Whiz, (Music, book and lyrics by Eric Rockwell and Joanne Bogart);
- 2011 - Odd Day Rain, (book by Janine Nina Trevins, music and lyrics by Deirdre Broderick);
- Princess Phooey (Book and lyrics by Lisa Diana Shapiro, music by Eric Rockwell);
- Up To You (book and music by Eric Rockwell, lyrics by Joanne Bogart).
- Maggie and the Pirate (based on the book by Ezra Jack Keats, book and lyrics by Winnie Holzman, music by David Evan)

The ensemble performs three pre-professional musicals a year, open to the public. Members also receive free vocal, acting, and dance training. Several TADA! participants of the ensemble have gained publicity since participating in the program, including Amar Ramasar, Josh Peck, Kerry Washington, Azealia Banks, Jordan Peele, Ricki Lake, Mizuo Peck and AJR. The education programs offer classes to children. Included in the education department are outreach programs, which provide classes at schools in boroughs other than Manhattan.
