= The Snowy Day =

1962 book by Ezra Jack Keats

- Author: Ezra Jack Keats
- Illustrator: Ezra Jack Keats
- Genre: Children's picture book
- Publisher: Viking Press
- Publication date: November 5, 1962
- Publication place: United States
- ISBN: 978-0-670-01270-1
- OCLC: 3003159
- LC Class: PZ7.K2253 Sn 1978

The Snowy Day is a 1962 American children's picture book by American author and illustrator Ezra Jack Keats. It features Peter, an African American child, who explores his neighborhood after the season's first snowfall. Keats’ illustrations helped pave the way for more inclusive and diverse children's literature. Keats received the 1963 Caldecott Medal for his collage artwork, which made The Snowy Day the first picture book with an African American protagonist to win a major children's award. The book's reception was largely positive, although some critics pointed out subtle stereotypes, such as how Peter's mother was portrayed. Since its publication, The Snowy Day has sold millions of copies and has been translated, adapted, and honored, leaving a lasting impression on generations of readers.

== Background ==
Keats, born Jacob (Jack) Ezra Katz, grew up in a poor Jewish family with immigrant parents in Brooklyn, New York. Following his service in World War II, he changed his last name from Katz to Keats to avoid anti-semitism and to find work in the book publishing industry. Keats's experience living in tenement housing surrounded by children of different cultures and ethnicities can be seen as inspiration for several of his books. For example, he and co-author, Pat Cherr, featured minority children in their first work, My Dog is Lost! However, none of Keats's more than 30 illustration jobs featured black children prior to The Snowy Day. He was one of the first authors to showcase a racially diverse protagonist in children's literature. If he wrote and illustrated his own book, Keats said he always knew the hero would be African American.

Keats began working on his first solo project, The Snowy Day, two years after My Dog is Lost! was published. He was inspired by a set of photographs of an African American boy from a 1940 edition of Life magazine that had hung in his studio for over two decades. Keats also noted that the storyline stems from his memories of snowy days in his Brooklyn childhood. Similar to the haiku poetry in which he found inspiration, Keats applied simple and straightforward text to The Snowy Day. Words were chosen to capture a mood and were further enhanced by colorful settings via his illustrations. These groundbreaking illustrations and this simple story earned him the Caldecott Medal in 1963, a prestigious award given to illustrators of American children's picture books. Since its publication, the book has sold several million copies. His character, Peter, went on to appear in Whistle for Willie (1964), Peter's Chair (1967), A Letter to Amy (1968), Goggles! (1969), another Caldecott Honor Medal book, Hi, Cat! (1970), and Pet Show! (1972). Keats lived until 1983 when he suffered a heart attack. His legacy as an author lives on, as the author and illustrator of 22 picture books.

== Plot ==
The book begins when Peter, The Snowy Day's protagonist, wakes up to the season's first snowfall. In his bright red snowsuit, he goes outside and makes footprints and trails through the snow. Next, Peter is too young to join a snowball fight with older kids, so he makes a snowman and snow angels and slides down a hill. He then returns home with a snowball stashed in his pocket. Before he goes to bed, Peter is sad to discover the snowball has melted. The book ends when the next day, he wakes up to tons more falling snow. With a friend, he ventures outside again.

== Genre ==
The Snowy Day's illustrations rely on a combination of collaged decorative paper, fabric and cloth. Asian art influences are seen throughout the story, giving readers a wintry theatrical backdrop across the width of two book pages. Keats created a homemade snowflake stamp and spattered India ink with a toothbrush to add embellishments. In later works that featured Peter, Keats added gouache, a watercolor and gum hybrid that resulted in an oily glaze. The simplicity that characterizes The Snowy Day gives way to complex artwork, as Keats' toolkit grew to encompass marbled paper, acrylic and watercolor paints, inks and old photographs. The illustrations are emotionally evocative and rely on painting techniques that include cubism and abstraction. In addition, The Snowy Day’s illustrations are so iconic that, in 2017, the U.S. Postal Service converted some of them to Forever stamps. Besides his own picture books that he wrote and illustrated, like The Snowy Day, Keats also illustrated over 80 works by other authors.

== Analysis ==
Through The Snowy Day, Keats aimed for his young readers to capture the wonder of a child’s first snowfall. While he was not trying to make a statement about race, The Snowy Day is one of the first books to feature a non-caricatured African American protagonist. Growing up in poverty in the streets of ethnically diverse New York City, Keats drew inspiration from those around him and also on his own experiences of being marginalized when forming his character Peter. Yet, in The Snowy Day, Peter has universal experiences that are not confined by race, allowing readers to relate to the story. By showcasing an African-American protagonist without the negative stereotypes that were prominent at the time, Keats paved the way for greater tolerance and diversity in children’s literature.

By the 1980s, critics began to recognize how far The Snowy Day had come from the stereotypical depictions in Little Black Sambo. A 50th anniversary edition of the book was published in 2011 and featured photos of the child who inspired Peter and a letter from Langston Hughes. Several contemporary honors and memorials also celebrate his vision of the universal human spirit.

== Reception ==
While some critics questioned whether or not Keats—a white Jewish man—could rightfully tell the story of an African American child, most early reviews of the book focus on its collage illustrations instead of the protagonist’s race. As one article in a Baltimore, Maryland-based African American newspaper said, “the illustrations are so appealing and colorful you will long remember them.” Other reviews did mention Peter's race, but in a positive or neutral light. For example, critics claimed “there is no way to tell he is different from any other child except that you note his skin is a soft-brown” and that The Snowy Day is a “darling book on a little colored boy.” Additionally, fan letters for Keats' book came from numerous African American activists, educators, and children who included their own collage artwork. One teacher told Keats that, for the first time, she watched as children selected brown crayons for their self-portraits.

However, as the civil rights movement progressed, The Snowy Day became the subject of more scrutiny. One common criticism revolved around Peter's lack of authentic African American culture and experiences. Nancy Larrick's 1965 article “The All-White World of Children’s Books” thought Peter's mother resembled a mammy stereotype. Being at the center of race-based objections upset the author greatly. Keats maintained his character was based on his own mother, and the author, who was no stranger to discrimination himself, was puzzled by the idea of assigning a race to children playing in the snow. Even though The Snowy Day was criticized for tokenism, Keats portrayed African American children with previously unseen positivity. Prior to The Snowy Day, the few children's books that featured African American children relied on negative stereotypes.

== Adaptations ==
In 1964, the book was made into an animated film directed and animated by Mal Wittman and narrated by Jane Harvey as Weston Woods Studios's first animated film.

In 2011, Ben Stiller was developing the live-action feature film adaptation of the book through his Red Hour Productions company for 20th Century Fox.

The Snowy Day was adapted as an animated preschool Christmas special released on Amazon Prime on November 25, 2016. The special is narrated by Laurence Fishburne and includes the voices of Regina King and Angela Bassett. In it, an original song, "Snowy Day," was performed by Boyz II Men. In 2017, this adaptation was nominated for five Daytime Emmy Awards, and won two. The special made its linear television debut on Disney Channel on December 4, 2020.

The Snowy Day inspired Andrea Davis Pinkney’s A Poem for Peter: The Story of Ezra Jack Keats and the Creation of The Snowy Day in 2016.

The Snowy Day has been translated into at least ten languages.

== Honors and memorials ==
The Ezra Jack Keats Foundation created the Ezra Jack Keats New Writer Award in 1985, and the Ezra Jack Keats New Illustrator Award was established in 2001.

The New York Public Library named The Snowy Day as one of its Books of the Century and included it in its exhibition on this subject which ran from May 1995 to July 1996.

In 2012 it was listed by the Library of Congress as one of the 88 Books That Shaped America.

Peter and his dog, Willie, are memorialized in a bronze statue in Imagination Playground in New York City.

Additionally, according to a 2020 article, The Snowy Day was number one on the list of "Top Check Outs Of All Time" by the New York Public Library.

In honor of its 125th anniversary, the Brooklyn Public Library revealed its 125 most borrowed books, with The Snowy Day ranking second behind Where the Wild Things Are.

Awards
Preceded by Once a Mouse	Caldecott Medal recipient 1963	Succeeded by Where the Wild Things Are
