= List of compositions by James Hotchkiss Rogers =

The following is a partial list of compositions by James Hotchkiss Rogers.

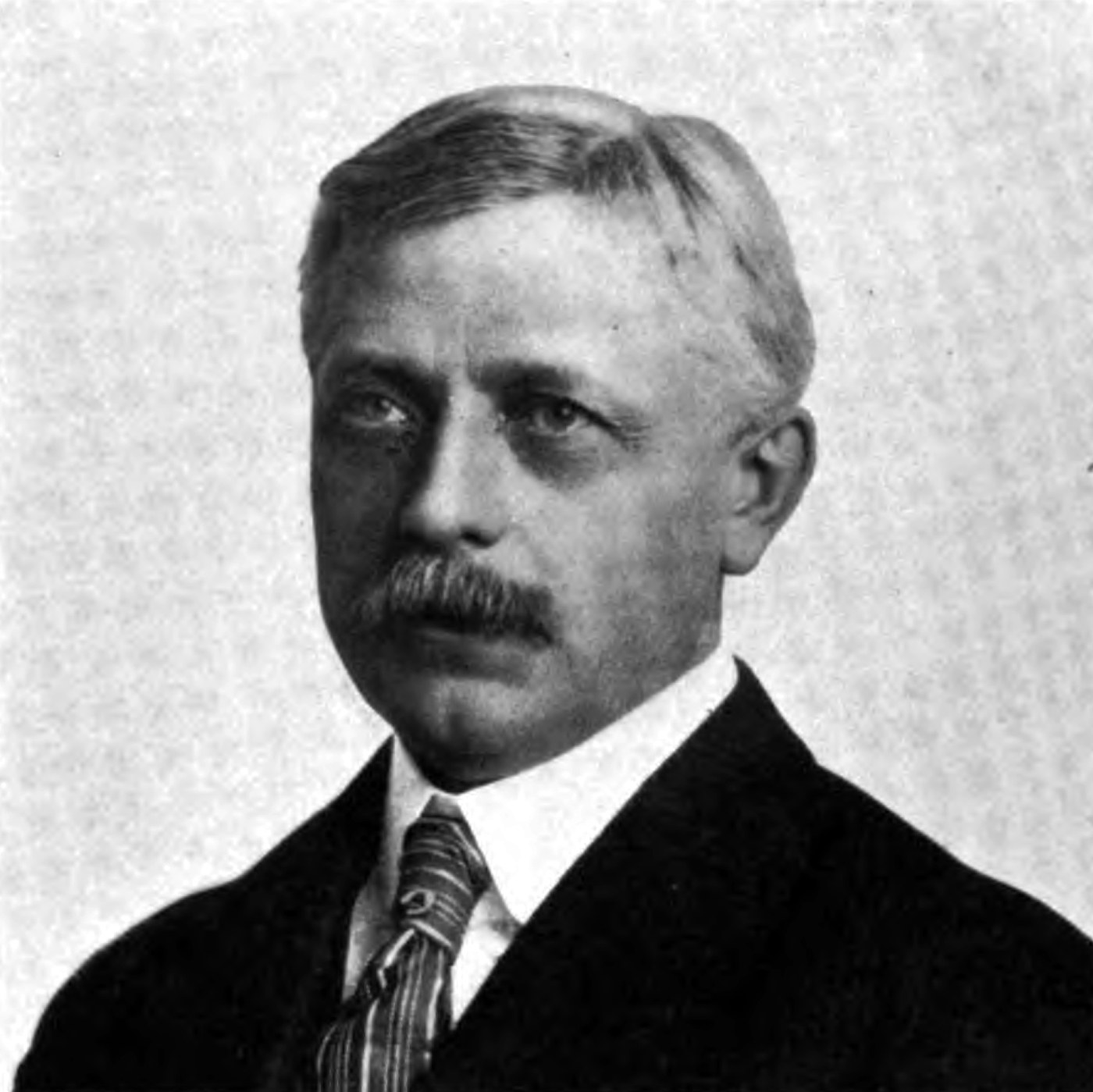
James H. Rogers in 1908

== By category ==
=== Large works ===
- The Man Of Nazareth, A Lenten Cantata For SATB Soli, Mixed Chorus and Organ, G. Schirmer, 1903
- The New Life, Easter Cantata

=== Chamber music ===
- Alla Polacca, Op. 27. No. 2, violin and piano, Oliver Ditson, 1901

=== Service music ===
- Jubilate in D (O Be Joyful), Oliver Ditson, 1915
- Sabbath Morning Service for the Synagogue
- Service for Sabbath evening, according to the Union Prayer Book, G. Schirmer, ©1912
- Temple Service for the Evening of the New Year

=== Church anthems and motets ===
- Asperges Me, Oliver Ditson, 1900
- Ave, Maris Stella, women's voices, Oliver Ditson, 1900
- Awake Up, My Glory, bass solo, SATB chorus, organ, G. Schirmer, 1908
- Beloved, if God so Loved Us, SATB chorus and organ, G. Schirmer, 1908
- Benedicite, Omnia Opera, SATB chorus and organ, G. Schirmer, 1912
- Break Forth into Joy, (Easter), in The Church Choralist, No. 406, 1908
- A Call to Worship, G. Schirmer, ©1916
- Fear Not O Land (Harvest or Thanksgiving), SATB chorus and organ, G. Schirmer, 1902
- I will Lift Up Mine Eyes, SATB chorus and organ, G. Schirmer, 1914
- I will Wash my Hands in Innocency, soprano solo, SATB chorus and organ, G. Schirmer, ©1916
- Let us Now Go Even Unto Bethlehem (Christmas), Oliver Ditson, 1915
- Look on the Fields (Harvest), Oliver Ditson, 1915
- The Lord Is My Strength, Oliver Ditson, 1915
- My Sheep Hear My Voice, Oliver Ditson, 1915
- O How Amiable are Thy Dwellings, Oliver Ditson, 1915
- O Lord, Our Lord, How Excellent Thy Name, Oliver Ditson, 1915
- The Pillars of the Earth, Oliver Ditson, 1915
- Praise Ye the Lord, Oliver Ditson, 1915
- Seek Him that Maketh the Seven Stars, Oliver Ditson, 1915
- Sing, O Daughter of Zion! (Christmas), soprano solo, SATB chorus and organ, G. Schirmer, ©1915

=== Secular choral works and partsongs ===
- At Parting, song arrangement for 2-part women's voices, G. Schirmer, 1926
- Bedouin Song, men's voices and piano, G. Schirmer, 1905
- But—They Didn't (E. V. Cooke), 4-part men's voices TTBB and piano, G. Schirmer, 1911
- The Snow Storm (Katharine Pyle), women's voices SSAA and piano, G. Schirmer, 1913
- Some Reckon Time by Stars (Madison Julius Cawein), 4-part men's voices TTBB, G. Schirmer, 1910/1916
- The Two Clocks (M. Erskine), women's voices SSAA, Oliver Ditson, 1910
- This Is She (Anonymous), 4-part men's voices TTBB and piano, G. Schirmer, ©1915

=== Organ music ===
- Berceuse in A major, Oliver Ditson, 1911
- Five Organ Pieces, G. Schirmer, 1907
1. Andante quasi Fantasia
2. Cantilène
3. Cortège Nuptial
4. Offertoire
5. Scherzoso
- Four Organ Pieces, G. Schirmer, ©1908
1. Christmas Pastorale
2. Invocation
3. Prelude in D Major
4. Grand Chœur
- Four Pieces for Organ, G. Schirmer, ©1905
1. Prelude in Db Major
2. Bridal Song
3. Sortie in G Major
4. Sortie in D Minor
- Preludes and Intermezzos, Seven short pieces for the organ, Sam Fox Publishing, ©1918
1. Serenata
2. Pomposo
3. Con Sentimente
4. Pastorale
5. Orientale
6. Allegretto Scherzando
7. Religioso
- Processional March, G. Schirmer, ©1910
- Reverie, G. Schirmer ©1910
- Second Toccata in C minor, Oliver Ditson, 1911
- Sonata No. 1 in E minor, G. Schirmer, ©1910
- Sonata No. 2 in D minor, G. Schirmer, 1921
- Sortie in F major, Oliver Ditson, 1911
- Suite for Organ No. 1, G. Schirmer, ©1905
1. Prologue (Molto maestoso)
2. March (Tempo moderato ma con spirito)
3. Intermezzo (Andantino)
4. Toccata (Introduction: Lento assai, Toccata: Allegro)
- Suite for Organ No. 2, Theodore Press, ©1915
1. Preambule (Con moto moderato)
2. Theme and variations (Andante, 4 variations)
3. Pastorale (Allegretto)
4. Scherzo (Vivace ma non troppo)
5. Epilogue (Con moto moderato)
- Third Sonata in B flat, G. Schirmer, 1923

=== Piano music ===
- Air de Ballet, Op. 24. No. 1, Oliver Ditson, 1904
- Alla Marcia, Op. 53. No. 1, Oliver Ditson, 1903
- Along a Country Road, C. F. Summy Co., 1914
1. A merry party
2. Birds in the branches
3. The gypsies are coming
4. By the brookside
- Deux Morceaux pour le Piano, G. Schirmer, 1907
1. Au Rouet (At the Spinning Wheel)
2. Valse Gracieuse
- Autrefois, Petite Suite dans le style ancien pour Piano, G. Schirmer, 1903
1. Allemande
2. Courante
3. Air varié
4. Menuet
5. Gigue
- The Bucking Pony, Bendix Publishing Co., 1930
- The Development of Velocity, Exercises and Studies for Pianoforte, Op. 40, G. Schirmer, 1902
- Octave Velocity, Twenty-four Exercises and Etudes for the Pianoforte, Music Mastery Series, Theodore Presser, 1910
- Ten Octave-Studies for Pianoforte, G. Schirmer, 1908
- Toy-Shop Sketches, Tune melodies for little folk, Theodore Presser, 1915
1. Jolly teddy bears
2. Toy soldiers' march
3. Dance of the toys
4. Fairy stories
5. Hobby horse
6. Punch and Judy show
7. Dolly's delight

=== Sacred art songs ===
- Great Peace Have They which Love Thy Law (text "From the Psalms"), G. Schirmer, ©1908
- How Long, O Lord, Wilt Thou Forget Me?, G. Schirmer
- A Prayer (Alfred Noyes), G. Schirmer, ©1918
- They That Sow in Tears, G. Schirmer
- Two Offertory Solos, Arthur P. Schmidt, ©1904
1. To-day if ye will hear His voice
2. Out of the Depths

=== Secular art songs ===
- Absence (Pai Ta-Shun/Frederick Peterson), G. Schirmer, 1915
- And Love Means—You, G. Schirmer
- April Weather (Ednah Proctor Clarke), Oliver Ditson, 1904
- At Parting (Frederick Peterson), G. Schirmer, ©1886, published 1906
- Aus Meinen Tränen Spriessen, G. Schirmer
- Autumn (F. Dana Burnet, G. Schirmer
- Barcarolle, G. Schirmer
- Bid Me to Live (Robert Herrick), Oliver Ditson, 1899
- Boot and Saddle: Cavalier Song (Robert Browning), Rogers & Eastman, 1900, reprinted by G. Schirmer
- Candlelight, Song of Christmas-tide (G. Hamilton), G. Schirmer, 1921
- The Captain (Margaret Darrel), Boston Music Co., ©1898
- The Cavalry, G. Schirmer
- Chanson de Printemps (All the World Awakens), G. Schirmer
- Déclaration, G. Schirmer
- Dumb Dora, Soliloquy for Medium Voice
- Ecstasy (Duncan Campbell Scott), G. Schirmer, ©1908
- Five Quatrains From The Rubáiyát Of Omar Khayyám (Omar Khayyám), Oliver Ditson, 1914
1. A book of verses underneath the bough
2. The moving finger writes
3. Yet ah, that spring should vanish with the rose
4. For some we loved
5. So when that angel of the darker drink
- Fly, White Butterflies, G. Schirmer
- Four Favorites after Mother Goose, Theodor Presser, 1914
1. Mary, Mary, quite contrary
2. Little Miss Muffet
3. Old Mother Hubbard
4. Little Jack Horner
- Im Wunderschönen Monat Mai, G. Schirmer
- In Harbour, G. Schirmer
- In Memorium, A Cycle of Songs
1. Dark mother, always gliding near (Walt Whitman)
2. Requiem (Robert Louis Stevenson)
3. The last invocation (Walt Whitman)
4. Joy, shipmate, joy! (Walt Whitman)
5. After death in Arabia (Sir Edwin Arnold)
6. Sail forth! (Walt Whitman)
- Invocation (Fred G. Bowles), Sam Fox Publishing, ©1917
- Julia's Garden (Charles Edward Thomas), G. Schirmer
- La Chanson de ma Mie (The Song of My Dearest), G. Schirmer
- The Last Song, G. Schirmer, 1922
- The Loreley, G. Schirmer
- A Love Note (Frank Lebby Stanton), G. Schirmer, ©1900
- Love's on the High-Road (F. Dana Burnet), G. Schirmer, 1914
- Moods, G. Schirmer, ©1900
1. Not from the Whole Wide World I Choose Thee (Richard Watson Gilder)
2. Years Have Flown Since I Knew Thee First (Richard Watson Gilder)
3. You (Louise Chandler Moulton)
4. Who Knows? (Louise Chandler Moulton)
- Requiescat, G. Schirmer
- Reveille, G. Schirmer
- Sea Fever (John Mansfield), G. Schirmer
- A Song of Changing Love, G. Schirmer
- Sweetest Flower That Blows
- Three Songs, G. Schirmer, ©1912
1. Amulets (Brian Hooker)
2. Cloud-Shadows (Katharine Pyle)
3. The Star: A Fragment from Plato (Charles F. Lummis)
- The Time for Making Songs has Come (Hermann Hagedorn), Oliver Ditson, 1919
- Träumerei, G. Schirmer
- Two Songs, G. Schirmer, ©1908
1. Extasy (Duncan Campbell Scott)
2. Oh, Drink Thou Deep of the Purple Wine (Alice Dunbar)
- The Voice of April, G. Schirmer
- The Wage of the Fighting Men, G. Schirmer
- War (F. Dana Burnet), Oliver Ditson, 1915
- When Pershing's Men go Marching into Picardy (D. Burnet), Oliver Ditson, 1918
- Wild Geese (Frederick Peterson), G. Schirmer, ©1915
- Wind Song (A. Hugh Fisher), G. Schirmer, ©1915
- Yesterday Ran Roses, G. Schirmer
