= Laura Spencer =

Laura Spencer may refer to:

- Laura Spencer (actress) (born 1986), American actress
- Laura Spencer (General Hospital), a fictional character in the television series General Hospital
- Laura Horton (formerly Spencer), a fictional character in the television series Days of Our Lives
- Laura Spencer-Churchill, Duchess of Marlborough (1915–1990), British noblewoman and socialite

== See also ==
- Laura Spencer Portor Pope (1872–1957), American journalist and author
- Lara Spencer (born 1969), American television journalist
