= Baboushka and the Three Kings =

1960 picture book by Ruth Robbins

Baboushka and The Three Kings
- Cover with Caldecott Medal seal
- Author: Ruth Robbins
- Illustrator: Nicolas Sidjakov
- Cover artist: Nicolas Sidjakov
- Genre: children's books picture books
- Publisher: Parnassus Press, later published by Houghton Mifflin Harcourt Publishing Company
- Publication date: 1960
- Publication place: United States
- Pages: 28 pp., color illus.
- OCLC: 169200
- Dewey Decimal: 398.2/1/0947 E
- LC Class: PZ8.1.R5 Bab

Baboushka and The Three Kings is a children's picture book written by Ruth Robbins, illustrated by Nicolas Sidjakov, and published by Parnassus Press in 1960. Sidjakov won the annual Caldecott Medal as illustrator of the year's "most distinguished American picture book for children".

== About ==
Parnassus was a small press in Berkeley, California, established in 1957 by Herman Schein, the husband of writer-illustrator Ruth Robbins. Sidjakov illustrated one of its first books and during the next several years it published at least three picture books he created with Robbins as writer.

== Plot ==
Baboushka and the Three Kings retells a "Russian folktale about an old woman's endless search for the Christ child". In a retrospective essay about the Caldecott Medal-winning books from 1956 to 1965, Norma R. Fryatt wrote, "Children will find in it something unusual, perhaps too removed from their experience and the Christmas story as they know it, but certainly it is a book to which they should be introduced... Primitive colors, rigid vertical lines, stylized figures, an unusual typeface that satisfied both artist and designer, – this combination of graphic skills was an experiment and one which in the main succeeded."

Baboushka is an old woman living in a meager hut in present-day Russia at the time of the birth of Jesus. One snowy night, she is visited by a procession of travelers heading for Bethlehem to honor the birth. The Three Kings invite Baboushka to join them, but she declines as she has not finished with her day's work, and the procession leaves without her.

Later that night, Baboushka realizes she cannot ignore her longing to see the child herself. The next morning, she sets out into the wilderness in search of the child, but is unsuccessful; the story ends by stating that Baboushka starts her search anew every year at Christmastime, and leaves Russian children gifts in the process.

== Song ==
The 28-page book includes a song "Baboushka," verse by Edith M. Thomas and musical score by Mary Clement Sanks.

Awards
Preceded by Nine Days to Christmas	Caldecott Medal recipient 1961	Succeeded by Once a Mouse
