= Nine Days to Christmas =

1959 picture book by Marie Hall Ets

- Author: Marie Hall Ets and Aurora Labastida
- Illustrator: Marie Hall Ets
- Genre: Children's picture book
- Publisher: Viking Press an imprint of Penguin Random House LLC.
- Publication date: 1959
- Publication place: United States

Nine Days to Christmas is a book by Marie Hall Ets and Aurora Labastida. Released by Viking Press, it was the recipient of the Caldecott Medal for illustration in 1960.

In the story, Ceci anxiously awaits her first posada, the special Mexican Christmas party, and the opportunity to select a piñata for it.

Awards
Preceded by Chanticleer and the Fox	Caldecott Medal recipient 1960	Succeeded by Baboushka and the Three Kings
