= Kitten for a Day =

1974 picture book by Ezra Jack Keats

- Author: Ezra Jack Keats
- Illustrator: Ezra Jack Keats
- Genre: Children's picture book
- Publisher: Macmillan/McGraw-Hill School Publishing Company
- Publication date: 1974
- Publication place: United States
- Media type: Print
- Pages: 31pp
- ISBN: 0-14-2300543
- Dewey Decimal: [E]

Kitten for a Day is a 1974 children's picture book by American author and illustrator Ezra Jack Keats, about a puppy that joins a litter of kittens for a day.

As of 2009, the book was still in print.

== Reception ==
Kirkus Reviews states "This is one of Keats' practically wordless picture books, and truth to tell there isn't much to the pictures either." and concludes "except on a cutesy level we thought Keats was above exploiting." while Publishers Weekly finds "Now, as ever, Keats's sunny illustrations reflect the joy of discovery."
