= Clementina's Cactus =

1982 picture book by Ezra Jack Keats

- Author: Ezra Jack Keats
- Illustrator: Ezra Jack Keats
- Genre: Children's picture book
- Publication date: 1982
- Publication place: United States
- ISBN: 0-670-88545-2
- OCLC: 165695
- Dewey Decimal: [E]

Clementina's Cactus is a 1982 children's picture book by American author and illustrator Ezra Jack Keats, his last children's book before his death the next year.

In Clementina's Cactus, Keats conveys a story without words. Clementina and her father encounter a single cactus while walking through the desert. Clementina investigates the dried, stumpy cactus until a thunderstorm sends them home. They return the next day to find a wonderful surprise.
