= Katharine Pyle =

American poet and illustrator (1863-1938)

Katherine Pyle
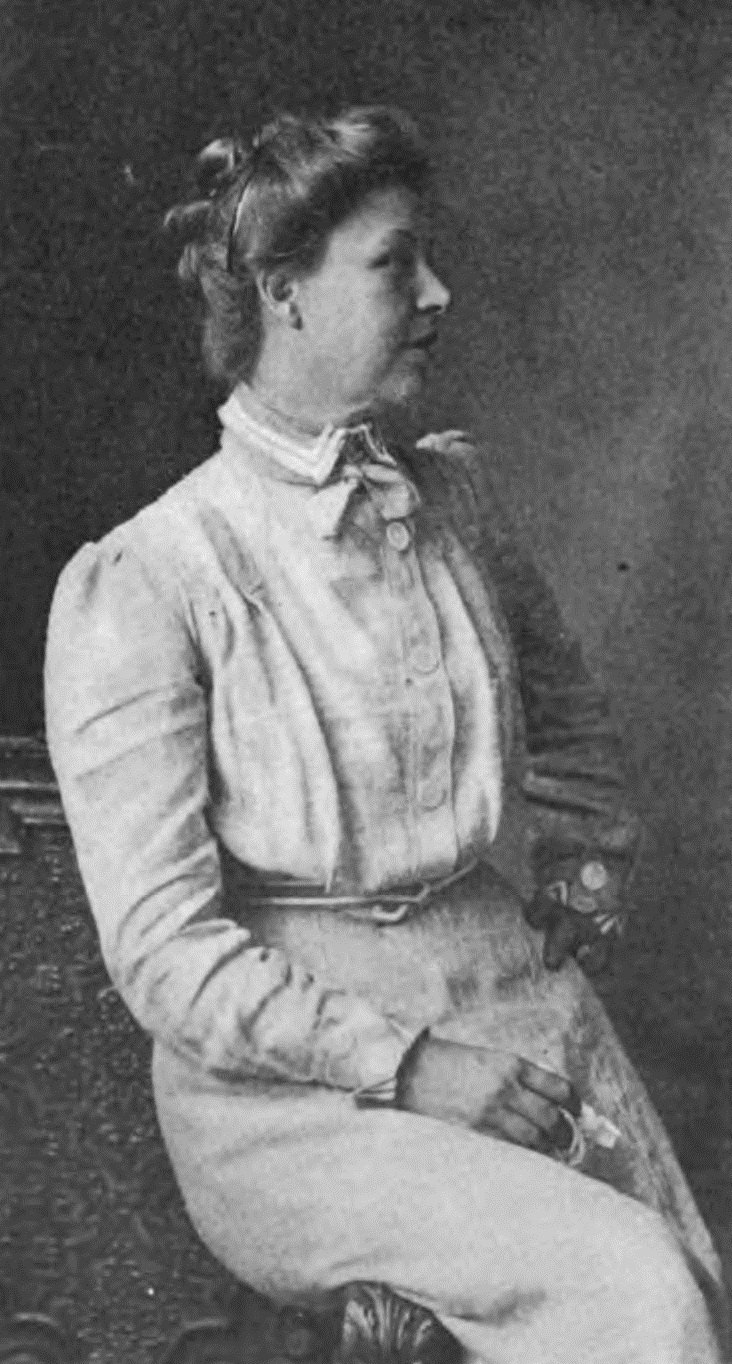
- Katherine Pyle
- Born: November 23, 1863; Wilmington, Delaware, US
- Died: February 19, 1938 (aged 74); Wilmington, Delaware, US
- Education: Philadelphia School of Design for Women
- Occupations: Artist, writer of children books
- Known for: Writing and illustration
- Relatives: Howard Pyle (brother)

Katharine Pyle (November 23, 1863 – February 19, 1938) was an American illustrator and author, primarily of books for young people, an influential member of the Pyle artistic family, active in Philadelphia during the late 19th and early 20th centuries. A native of Wilmington, Delaware, and a social activist, she published several accounts of Delaware's colonial history.

== Early life ==
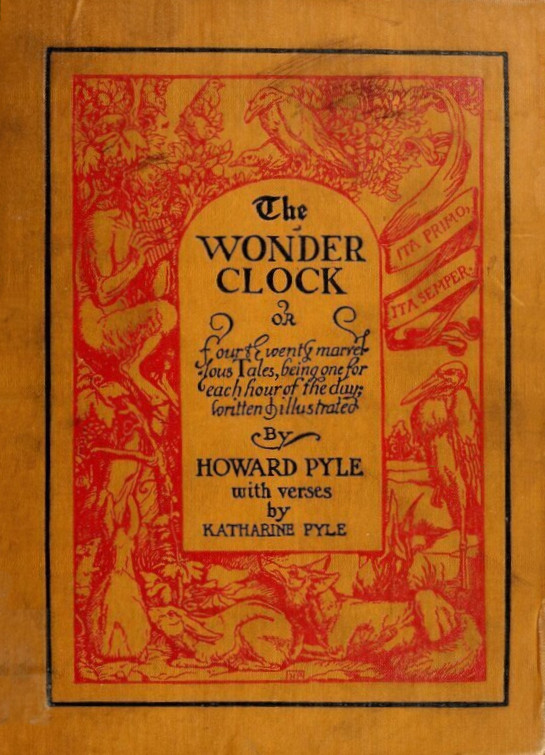
Pyle, Howard & Katharine, The Wonder Clock (1887), cover, 1st edition

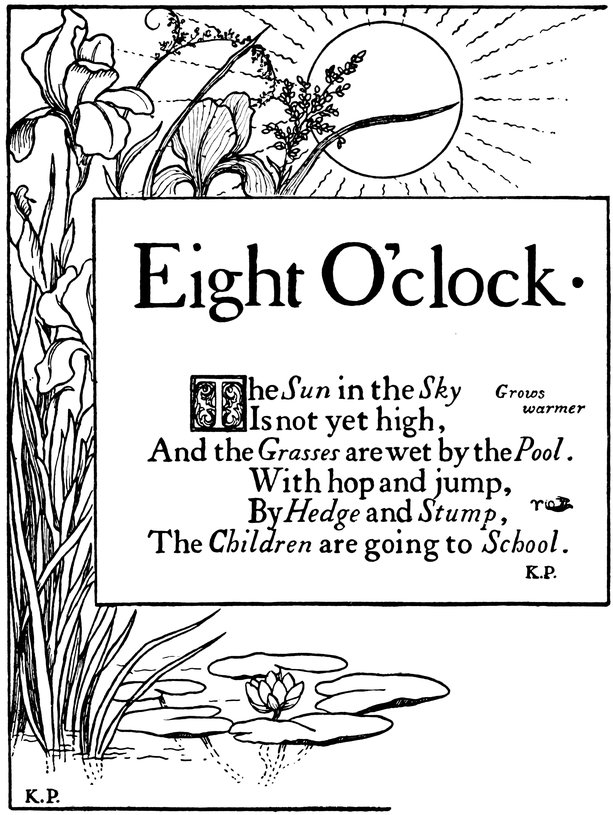
Katharine Pyle, The Wonder Clock (1887) poem and "decoration"

Born in Wilmington, Delaware, Katharine was the youngest child of William Pyle, a leather manufacturer, and Margaret Churchman Painter, an "amateur" writer. Her older brother (by ten years) was author and illustrator Howard Pyle.

Both Howard and her parents encouraged Katharine's artistic inclinations, though the modest style of the Quaker household dictated that Katharine not be given too much praise. Howard wrote Margaret of then 13 year old Katharine: "Katie is doing wonderfully well. But do not tell her that I said so. For I think it would be even better to speak slightingly of her verses than to praise them unduly. It would be the greatest misfortune to her should she ever become satisfied with her work."

Katharine was educated at Philadelphia's Women's Industrial School (1883) and at the Drexel Institute, where she attended her brother's illustration classes, followed by a course of study at the Philadelphia School of Design for Women.

Her first published works were poems in St. Nicholas magazine (1880) and Harper’s Bazaar (1884). From 1886, she collaborated with Howard on The Wonder Clock, published in Harper’s Young People in 1886–1887 and as a book in 1887. During this period, Katharine was taxed with the responsibility of the Pyle household (Margaret Pyle had died in 1885), escaping this role only with her 1892 move to New York City to enroll at the Art Students League.

== Work ==
=== New York Years ===
While at the Art Students League, Pyle continued to receive commissions from Harper’s Bazaar and St. Nicholas. In 1893, her art was exhibited at the World's Columbian Exposition, and by 1895, she had begun work as a professional author illustrator, with the publication of The Rabbit Witch and Other Stories (1895, republished in multiple editions as Careless Jane and Other Tales, from 1902). That same year, she contributed the illustrations to Edith M. Thomas’s highly praised book of poetry, In Sunshine Land (1895).

Pyle published The Counterpane Fairy in 1898, the book generally regarded as cementing her reputation.

=== The Golden Age of Illustration in America ===
The period between 1880 and 1914 is regarded as the Golden Age of Illustration in America, when the proliferation of expense-saving improvements in printing practices and a "newly literate public," aligned. For women, particularly, this opened opportunities in a new market for their labor, and Katherine Pyle, as Howard Pyle's younger sister, was in a unique position to benefit from this trend. Howard Pyle was teacher and "sometime mentor" to a "whole school of American women illustrators," including Ethel Franklin Betts, Elizabeth Shippen Green, Charlotte Harding, Violet Oakley, Sarah S. Stilwell, Ellen Bernard Thompson (Pyle), and Jessie Wilcox Smith. These women studied in Howard's classes alongside Katharine, and many of them were her friends. When Pyle returned to from New York, she engaged with former classmates on numerous book projects, sometimes writing, sometimes illustrating.

Her own first book, The Counterpane Fairy, was published in 1898, and by 1902 she was collaborating on projects with friends from her Drexel classes, including Bertha Corson Day with their book of fairy tales, Where the Wind Blows, written by Pyle and illustrated by Day.

Pyle moved to Boston in 1904, where she taught art at Lincoln House, a settlement house. Summers Pyle painted portraits while visiting nearby Cape Cod. She contracted tuberculosis in sometime in 1909, for which she was successfully treated in Asheville NC. Once healthy, she returned to Wilmington where she continued to illustrate and publish, along with her charitable activities. Following dissension with her editor at Harper's Bazaar regarding several of her fairy tale submissions, the works of her final decade centered on "legendary fairy tales with moral messages."

=== The Last Decade ===
Pyle continued to publish through to her last years. Her last titles continued to include materials and stories "seeming to lend themselves less adaptable for young people," and contemporary reviews did not always consider her to be up to this challenge. Her 1933 anthology, Charlemagne and his Knights, was praised for its illustrations, but the story adaptations received mixed reviews. Some viewed these challenging later adaptations as evidence that Pyle possessed an "even more versatile genius" than her brother, extolling the author's work in discreetly softening "the darkness and brutality" in favor of "the heroism, the gorgeousness, the religious fervor and the magic" of the tales, others did not find her touch so adept.

== Legacy ==
Over the course of her career she wrote over 30 books and illustrated the works of others. The Delaware Art Museum has a substantial collection of her manuscripts.

== Selected works ==
The Rabbit Witch and Other Tales (1895) front cover illustration

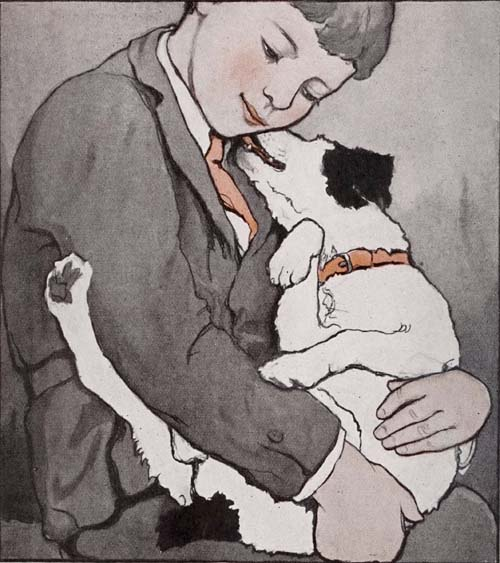
The Black Eyed Puppy (1923) "I hardly knew what to do, I was so glad"

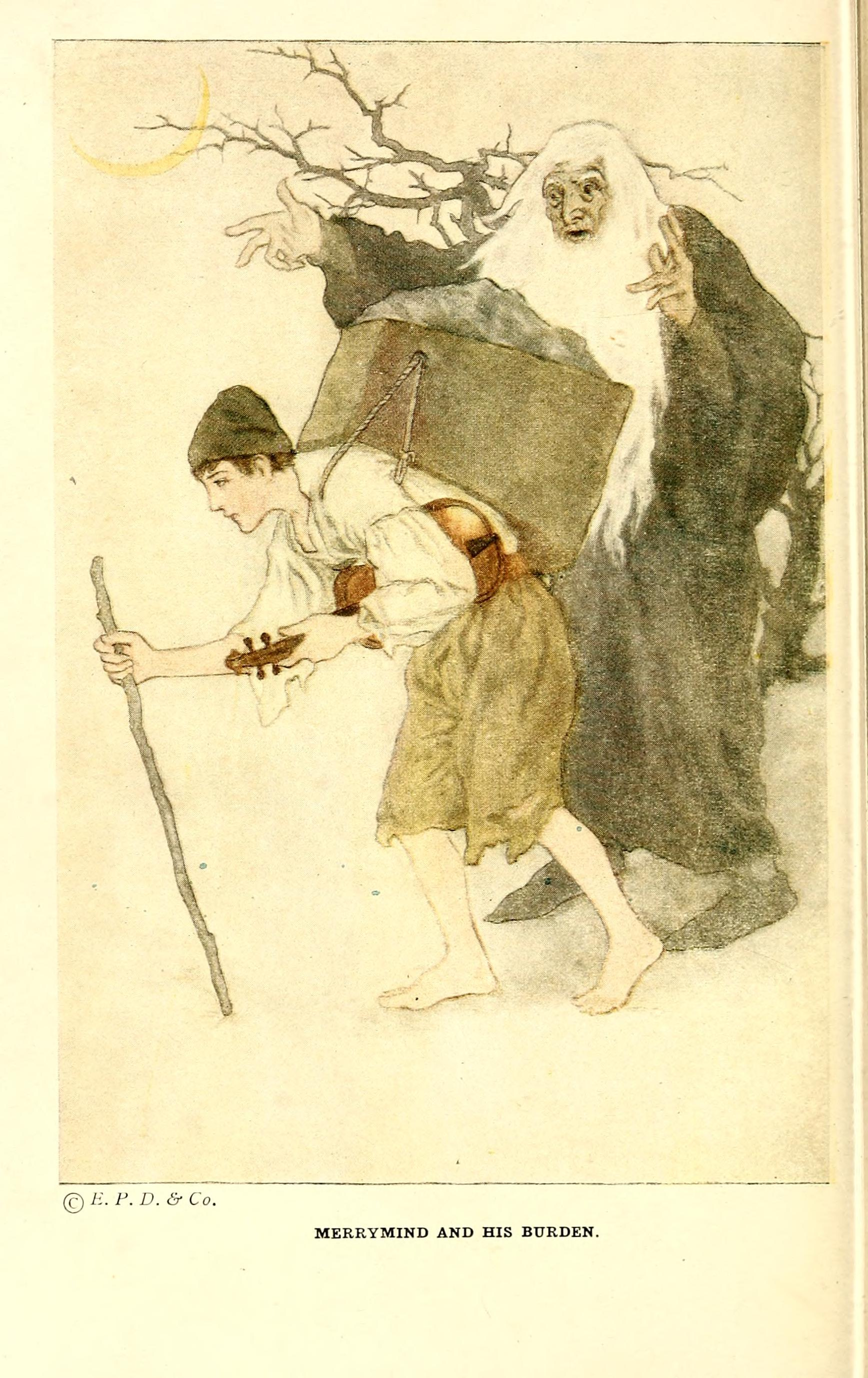
Granny's Wonderful Chair (1916) "Merrymind and his burden"

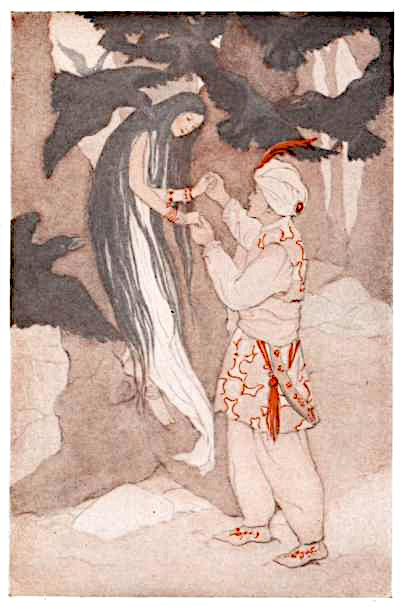
Tales of Folk and Fairies (1919) "The Rajah brought the girl down, while the crows circled"

Tales of Wonder and Magic (1920) front cover illustration

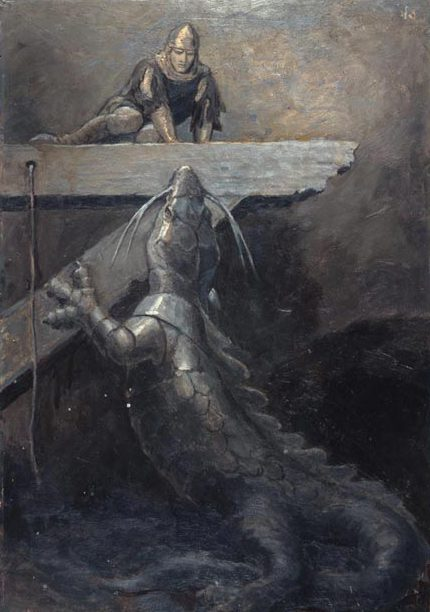
Charlemagne & His Knights (1932)

== Bibliography ==
=== Books ===
- The Wonder Clock (1888), with her brother Howard Pyle
- The Counterpane Fairy (1898)
- The Rabbit Witch, and Other Tales, Dutton, 1895 (also published as Careless Jane and Other Tales)
- Prose and Verse for Children (1899)
- The Christmas Angel (1900)
- Nancy Rutledge (1906)
- Once Upon a Time in Delaware (1911)
- Tales of Folk and Fairies (1919)
- Tales of Wonder and Magic (1920)
- Fairy Tales from Far and Near (1922)
- Wonder Tales from Many Lands (1923)
- Tales from Greek Mythology (1928)
- Charlemagne and his Knights (1932)

=== Illustrations ===
- In Sunshine Land (1895) Edith M. Thomas
- Amy in Acadia: A Story for Girls (1905) Helen Leah Reed
- Faery Tales of Weir (1918) Anna McClure Sholl
