= One Red Sun, a Counting Book =

1998 picture book by Ezra Jack Keats

- Front cover, designed by Ezra Jack Keats
- Author: Ezra Jack Keats
- Illustrator: Ezra Jack Keats
- Cover artist: Ezra Jack Keats
- Genre: children's book
- Publisher: Viking, an imprint of Penguin Random House LLC
- Publication date: 1999
- Publication place: United States
- ISBN: 0-670-88478-2
- OCLC: 155082
- Dewey Decimal: [E]

One Red Sun, a Counting Book is a 1999 children's picture book that emulates and includes the work of American author and illustrator Ezra Jack Keats.
