= Laura Spencer Portor Pope =

Laura Spencer Portor Pope (4 February 1872 – 1957) was an American journalist and author of short stories and several books. She is known as the co-author with Dorothy Giles of two science fiction novels, The valley of creeping men (1930) and Chattering gods (1931), both of which appeared under the pseudonym "Rayburn Crawley."

== Biographical facts ==
Laura Spencer Portor married Francis Pope, but she continued to use the name "Laura Spencer Portor" for all her professional publications except the two science novels which she co-authored. She published articles and short stories in Woman's Home Companion, Harper's Magazine, The Outlook, The Dial and several other magazines.

== Selected publications ==
- Shakespeare pamphlets. 1900.; lettering and decorations by Joan D. Manning
- with Katharine Pyle: Theodora. 1907.; illustrated from drawings by William A. McCullough
- Greatest books in the world; interpretive studies. With lists of collateral reading helpful to the study of great literature. Houghton Mifflin. 1913.; 2nd edition. Chautauqua Press. 1917.
- Genevieve; a story of French school days. Little schoolmate series. E.P. Dutton & company. 1914.
- Story of little angels. Harper & brothers. 1917.
- Adventures in indigence. The Atlantic monthly press. 1918.
- "On Living Next to James Huneker". Scribner's Magazine. Vol. 71. 1922. pp. 303–308.
- Little long-ago. 1927.
- with Alida Conover as illustrator: New York, the giant city; an introduction to New York. 1939.; 2nd edition. 1953.
