= Peter's Chair =

1967 picture book by Ezra Jack Keats

- Author: Ezra Jack Keats
- Illustrator: Ezra Jack Keats
- Genre: Children's picture book
- Publication date: 1967
- Publication place: United States
- ISBN: 0-14-0564411
- Dewey Decimal: [E]

Peter's Chair is a 1967 children's picture book by American author and illustrator Ezra Jack Keats.

== Background ==
Peter's Chair is the third in a series of books by Keats, following the 1963 Caldecott Medal winner The Snowy Day (1962) and Whistle for Willie (1964), that follow an African American boy named Peter throughout his childhood. The book, edited by Ursula Nordstrom, is the first in the series to be published by Harper. It was originally set to be titled The Blue Chair.

The story of Peter's Chair addresses family conflicts such as sibling rivalry and running away from home, echoing events in Keats' own childhood. Kirkus Reviews called the story "a soupcon of security for displaced preschoolers."

== Plot ==
Peter has a new baby sister, Suzy. First his father paints Peter's old cradle pink, then his crib. Then his parents want to paint Peter's blue chair. "Let’s run away, Willie," he says to his dog. They do, Peter taking his chair with him. However, he finds that the chair is too small for him, and he returns home. The final two pages show Peter sitting in an adult-sized chair and helping his father paint his old chair pink.

== Adaptations ==
In 1971 in an iconographic film produced by Weston Woods Studios, Loretta Long narrated the story.

Sophie Aldred also read the story in a 1992 episode of Words and Pictures featuring the letter G.
