= Nicolas Sidjakov =

American graphic designer and illustrator

Nicolas Sidjakov (December 16, 1924 – June 20, 1993) was an American commercial artist and illustrator. He was a co-founder of Sidjakov & Berman Associates and later Sidjakov, Berman & Gomez design firms.

== Biography ==
Sidjakov was born in Riga, Latvia. He studied at the Ecole des Beaux Arts in Paris, worked in advertising, and freelanced for the French movie industry. In 1954 he moved to the United States and continued to work in advertising. He also began to illustrate children's books, mainly picture books, beginning with The Friendly Beasts by Laura Nelson Baker, adapted from "The Friendly Beasts", an English Christmas carol. It was published in 1957 by Parnassus Press of Berkeley, California.

Parnassus was a small press established only that year by Herman Schein, whose wife Ruth Robbins was a writer and illustrator. During the next several years it published at least three picture books created by Robbins, as writer, and Sidjakov. The first was Baboushka and the Three Kings, retelling the "Russian folktale about an old woman's endless search for the Christ child". For that work he received the annual Caldecott Medal from the American Library Association in 1961, as illustrator of the previous year's "most distinguished American picture book for children".

From 1945 to the 1970s, San Francisco was a hub of creativity and Sidjakov was in the thick of it. He designed more than he illustrated and there were many accolades for him in the advertising annuals of the 1960s and 1970s.

In 1978, he and Jerry Berman formed the design firm of Sidjakov & Berman Associates, then Sidjakov, Berman & Gomez in 1981. In 1987 the company became part of the British-owned WPP Group plc and is now known as Enterprise IG, San Francisco.

Sidjakov was a resident of Sausalito in Marin County, California, when he died in 1993.

== Selected works ==
Picture books illustrated

- The Friendly Beasts, written by Laura Nelson Baker (Berkeley, CA: Parnassus Press, 1959) – adapted from "The Friendly Beasts", OCLC 1003721
- Baboushka and the Three Kings, Ruth Robbins (Parnassus, 1960) – adapted from Russian folklore, OCLC 169200
- The Emperor and the Drummer Boy, Ruth Robbins (Parnassus, 1962) – published simultaneously in French, the Emperor is Napoleon, OCLC 301389
- Harlequin and Mother Goose, or, The Magic Stick, Ruth Robbins (Parnassus, 1965) – based on English Harlequinade, OCLC 171051291
- A Lodestone and a Toadstone, Irene Elmer (Alfred A. Knopf, 1969), OCLC 50979
- Staffan: an old Christmas folk song, translated from Swedish (Parnassus, 1970), OCLC 8032547
