= John Henry, an American Legend =

1965 picture book by Ezra Jack Keats

- Author: Ezra Jack Keats
- Illustrator: Ezra Jack Keats
- Genre: Children's picture book
- Publication date: 1965
- Publication place: United States
- ISBN: 0-81-2459466

John Henry, an American Legend is a 1965 children's picture book by American author and illustrator Ezra Jack Keats. In this book, it shows that John Henry, a hard working miner tries to beat the steam drill. He used a 20-pound hammer against a steam drill. Whoever won would get 100 dollars and new clothes. In the end John Henry won the competition, but he also broke inside. He puts his hammer on top of his chest and dies in honor. "A man ain't nothin' but a man".
