= Over in the Meadow =

Counting rhyme

"Over in the Meadow" is a popular counting rhyme written by Olive A. Wadsworth (pen name of Katherine Floyd Dana) in 1870. Many variations on the original wording exist. It has also been set to music, and has been used as the text of numerous picture books.

== Sample verse ==
Over in the meadow,
In the sand in the sun
Lived an old mother toadie
And her little toadie one.
"Wink!" said the mother;
"I wink!" said the one,
So they winked and they blinked
In the sand in the sun.

== Musical and Children's Book Adaptations ==
The poem was adapted and set to music by John Langstaff. Several versions have been published as illustrated children's books, including Langstaff's (illustrated by Feodor Rojankovsky, with musical score by Marshall Woodbridge, 1957 and many subsequent editions) and another by Ezra Jack Keats (1971). Langstaff's version was recorded by Tony Saletan (Song Bag, 1974) and others.
