= Pet Show! =

1972 picture book by Ezra Jack Keats

Pet SHow
- Author: Ezra Jack Keats
- Illustrator: Ezra Jack Keats
- Genre: Children's picture book
- Publication date: 1972
- Publication place: United States
- ISBN: 0-14-2300004
- OCLC: 155082
- Dewey Decimal: [E]

Pet Show! is a 1972 children's picture book by American author and illustrator Ezra Jack Keats. In an animated movie by Weston Woods Studios, Inc. in 1992, Terry Alexander narrated the movie with music by Fred Weinberg and Joe Beck.

== Plot ==
Archie wants to enter his cat in the neighborhood pet show—but where is the cat? Archie keeps on looking even after all the other kids have given up, but his pet is nowhere to be found. Ingenious Archie has a plan to enter the contest—with a most surprising creature and enters an empty jar which he says contains a germ whom he named Al.

== Reception ==
Publishers Weekly stated that Pet Show! '...captures a smalltown simplicity amidst an urban landscape...' while a Kirkus Reviews review spoke of the author's '... brightly patterned collage, exuberant thick-smudged paint, and general good will...'.
