= Once a Mouse =

1961 picture book by Marcia Brown

- Author: Marcia Brown
- Illustrator: Marcia Brown
- Genre: Children's picture book
- Publisher: Scribner Press
- Publication date: 1961
- Publication place: United States

Once a Mouse is a 1961 children's picture book by Marcia Brown. Released by Scribner Press, it was the recipient of the Caldecott Medal for illustration in 1962, the second time Brown received that honor.

== Plot ==
Once a Mouse is a magical Indian fable that tells the story of a small mouse and a hermit that knows how to change animals into something else. One day the hermit is sitting under a tree when suddenly he sees a little, helpless mouse that is going to be eaten by a cat. The hermit decides to change the mouse into a cat. Later the old man sees the cat afraid of a dog and changes the cat into a dog. The next day the hermit sees a tiger trying to eat the dog and decides to change the dog into a majestic tiger. As the days pass, the majestic tiger begins to think that he is the king of the place and that all the animals must respect him including the old hermit. One day the hermit reminds the tiger that he is really a mouse and that he should not be acting the way he is acting. The tiger feels so angry that he decides to eat the hermit, but he does not know that the old man is able to read thoughts. Finally the hermit changes the tiger back into a mouse and tells him to learn how to take care of himself.

Awards
| Preceded by Baboushka and the Three Kings | Caldecott Medal recipient 1962 | Succeeded by The Snowy Day |
