= Apt. 3 =

1971 picture book by Ezra Jack Keats

- Author: Ezra Jack Keats
- Illustrator: Ezra Jack Keats
- Cover artist: Ezra Jack Keats
- Genre: Children's picture book
- Publisher: Viking Children's Books
- Publication date: 1971
- Publication place: United States
- ISBN: 0-14-056507-8
- OCLC: 155082
- Dewey Decimal: [E]

Apt. 3 is a 1971 children's picture book by American author and illustrator Ezra Jack Keats. It was published in 1971 by The Macmillan Company.

== Plot ==
The sound of a harmonica floats through the halls of Sam and Ben's tenement. The sweet melodies inspire the brothers to explore the building, which is filled with the sounds and smells of a diverse city. Finally, the brothers find the source of the beautiful music, along with a blind man who “sees” with his ears, and the search ends in a new friendship.

== Film ==
In 1979, the film, narrated by Charles Turner, was released.
