= Maggie and the Pirate =

1979 picture book by Ezra Jack Keats

- Author: Ezra Jack Keats
- Illustrator: Ezra Jack Keats
- Genre: Children's picture book
- Publication date: 1979
- Publication place: United States
- ISBN: 0-59-0448528
- Dewey Decimal: [E]

Maggie and the Pirate is a 1979 children's picture book by American author and illustrator Ezra Jack Keats.

== Plot summary ==
Maggie's pet cricket Niki, in the cage her father built, is stolen by someone calling himself the Pirate. Maggie and her friends hunt all over the place, and finally she finds the Pirate's hide-out. However, during the rescue, Niki is accidentally drowned. Maggie and her friends bury the cricket, and the Pirate, a new kid in the neighborhood, comes to apologize and to bring back the cage, which has a new cricket inside.

== Reception ==
Kirkus Reviews found "Keats' scruffy urchins with their black dot eyes are jaunty, though a shade too cute, and his marbleized skies at dusk are a shade too turbulent and charged for the relatively anemic story." but "...it is cheering to see the sun come out in these blurry, rainbow-colored pages." Publishers Weekly thought "The Caldecott Medalist's typically vital art graces this tender tale of a girl who finds a new friend while searching for her kidnapped cricket."

== Musical ==
A children's musical was commissioned by TADA! Youth Theater in 1989. I featured a score by David Evan and a libretto by Winnie Holzman. It was reprised by TADA in 1996, 2007, 2013, 2016 and 2022.
