= Regards to the Man in the Moon =

1981 children's book

- Author: Ezra Jack Keats
- Illustrator: Ezra Jack Keats
- Genre: Children's picture book
- Publisher: Viking Children's Books
- Publication date: 1981
- Publication place: United States
- ISBN: 0-67-0011371
- Dewey Decimal: [E]

Regards to the Man in the Moon is a 1981 children's picture book by American author and illustrator Ezra Jack Keats.

The book was published by Viking Children's Books.

== Plot summary ==
Louie is teased by the neighborhood children because his father works as a junk dealer and collects discarded items. His father encourages him to see value in the scraps by using his imagination. Inspired by this advise, Louie and his friend Susie build a makeshift spaceship out of salvaged materials- including a bathtub, an old stove, and a lawnmower - and embark on an imaginary journey into outer space, eventually winning over the neighborhood children who once mocked them.

== Reception ==
Martha Rasmussen of The Des Moines Register wrote that "power of imagination vividly in the collage illustrations that make Louie's pretend space voyage as full of drama, wonder, danger and beauty as the real thing." Ann Waldron of The Philadelphia Inquirer wrote: "The message is a great one, and Keats' paintings of space are gorgeous." The Record-Journal opined that Keats' "colorful drawings are as captivating as his fun-filled text."
