= A Letter to Amy =

1968 picture book by Ezra Jack Keats

- Author: Ezra Jack Keats
- Illustrator: Ezra Jack Keats
- Genre: Children's picture book
- Publisher: Viking Books (originally HarperCollins)
- Publication date: 1968
- Publication place: United States
- ISBN: 0-14-056442-X
- OCLC: 165695
- Dewey Decimal: [E]

A Letter to Amy is a 1968 children's picture book by American author and illustrator Ezra Jack Keats.

== Plot ==
"Peter [from Keats' The Snowy Day] is having a birthday party, and he's asked all of his friends to come. But Amy is a special friend because she's a girl, so Peter decides to send her a special invitation. When he rushes out in a thunderstorm to mail it, he bumps smack into Amy herself and knocks her to the ground. Will she come to his party now?"

== Adaptations ==
In 1970, Loretta Long narrated the story in a film adaptation from Weston Woods Studios.
