= Marie Hall Ets =

American writer (1895–1984)

- Born: December 16, 1895; Milwaukee, Wisconsin
- Died: January 17, 1984 (aged 88); Inverness, Florida
- Known for: Illustration
- Spouse(s): Milton Rodig (m. 1917–1918), Harold Norris Ets (m. 1930–1943)
- Awards: Caldecott Medal (1960)

Marie Hall Ets (December 16, 1895 – January 17, 1984) was an American writer and illustrator who is best known for children's picture books.

== Life ==
Marie Hall Ets was born in Milwaukee, Wisconsin, on December 16, 1895. She attended Lawrence College. In 1918, she journeyed to Chicago where she became a social worker at the Chicago Commons, a settlement house on the northwest side of the city.

In 1960 Ets won the annual Caldecott Medal for her illustrations of Nine Days to Christmas, for which she also co-authored text with Aurora Labastida. Five of her titles were runners-up for that honor between 1945 and 1966, a record surpassed only by Maurice Sendak. (Note: Since 1971 the runners-up are called Caldecott Honor Books, but some runners-up had been identified annually and all those runners-up were retroactively named Caldecott Honor Books. The number of Honors or runners-up had always been one to five, and it had been two to four since 1994, until five were named in 2013 and six in 2015. The Honor Books must be a subset of the runners-up on the final ballot, either the leading runners-up on that ballot or the leaders on one further ballot that excludes the winner.)

Just Me and In the Forest are both Caldecott Honor books. The black-and-white charcoal illustrations in Just Me "almost take on the appearance of woodcuts" and are similar in style to the illustrations in In the Forest. Constantine Georgiou comments in Children and Their Literature that Ets' "picture stories and easy-to-read books" (along with those of Maurice Sendak) "are filled with endearing and quaint human touches, putting them at precisely the right angle to life in early childhood." Play With Me, says Georgiou, is "a tender little tale, delicately illustrated in fragile pastels that echo the quiet mood of the story."

In 1970, her transcription of the autobiographical stories of Ines Cassettari, whom she met in Chicago in the years following World War I, was published as Rosa: The Life of an Italian Immigrant.

Ets died in Inverness, Florida, on January 17, 1984.

== Selected works ==
- Mister Penny (Viking Press, 1935)
- The Story of a Baby, 1939
- In the Forest, 1944 (Note: A Caldecott Honor Book)
- My Dog Rinty, 1946, by Ellen Terry
- Oley, the Sea monster, 1947
- Little Old Automobile, 1948
- Mr. T. W. Anthony Woo: the story of a cat and a dog and a mouse, 1951
- Beasts and Nonsense, 1952
- Another Day, 1953
- Play With Me, 1955
- Mister Penny's Race Horse, 1956
- Cow's Party, 1958
- Nine Days to Christmas (Viking, 1959), text with Aurora Labastida
- Mister Penny's Circus, 1961
- Gilberto and the Wind, 1963
- Automobiles for Mice, 1964
- Just Me, 1965
- Bad Boy, Good Boy, 1967
- Talking Without Words: I Can. Can You?, 1968
- Rosa, the Life of an Italian Immigrant (transcribed by Ets), 1970; second edition, 1999, University of Wisconsin Press
- Elephant in a Well, 1972
- Jay Bird, 1974
