= Anna McClure Sholl =

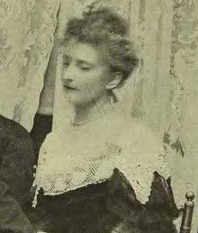
- Born: March 17, 1868; Philadelphia
- Died: April 1, 1956 (aged 88); New York City
- Alma mater: Cornell University
- Occupation: Writer

Anna McClure Sholl (March 17, 1868 – April 1, 1956) was an American writer and painter.

== Early life ==
Anna McClure Sholl was born on March 17, 1868 in Philadelphia, daughter of William J. Sholl and Clara Corson Sholl. She attended Cornell University.

== Career ==
She wrote about embarking on her writing career with a second place win in a St. Nicholas Magazine writing contest for chikdren. She began her professional writing career at the New York Commercial Advertiser in 1896. Sholl wrote in a wide variety of genres: poetry, short stories, magazine articles, book reviews, fairy tales, and mystery novels. She converted to Catholicism in 1916 and some of her work is about religious subjects.

Her short story "The Black Roses" was published in The Black Cat in March 1904. Compared to "Rappaccini's Daughter", the story concerns a scientist who uses his laboratory to subject roses to poisons which turn the flowers black.

Her book Carmichael won a bronze medal from the Lyceum Club in London, England.

Anna McClure Sholl died on April 1, 1956 in New York City.

== Writings ==
- The Law of Life. D. Appleton, 1903
- The Port of Storms. D. Appleton, 1905
- The Greater Love . Outing, 1908.
- Blue Blood and Red. (as Geoffrey Corson) H. Holt, 1915. Published in England as Carmichael
- This Way Out. Hearst International Library, 1915.
- The Ancient Journey. Longmans, 1917.
- Faery Tales of Weir. (illustrated by Katharine Pyle) E. P. Dutton, 1918.
- The Unclaimed Letter. Dorrance, 1921.
- The Mystery of Lostland Academy. New York: Federation, 1925.
- The Four Wax Figures
- The Disappearance of the Dale Family
