= Ines Cassettari =

Italian emigrant to America

Ines Cassettari (died 1943) was an Italian emigrant to America whose autobiography became famous. She was born in 1866 or 1867 in Lombardy, Italy, and abandoned at birth, and lived in an orphanage and then a foster home. She was forced to marry an abusive man. They immigrated to the United States, where she refused to run a brothel for him and eventually left him. She remarried and worked as a cleaning woman in the Chicago Commons until she died.

Her name was changed to Rosa Cavalleri in Rosa: The Life of an Italian Immigrant, which was her autobiography as transcribed by Marie Hall Ets; it was published in 1970 and republished in 1999. She had met Ets in the Chicago Commons. Italian Signs, American Streets: The Evolution of Italian American Narrative by Fred L. Gardaphe calls her book "[o]ne of the strongest Italian American immigrant narratives".
