= In the Forest (picture book) =

1944 picture book by Marie Hall Ets

- 1960 UK edition
- Author: Marie Hall Ets
- Publisher: Viking Press
- Publication date: 1944
- Pages: unpaged
- Awards: Caldecott Honor

In the Forest is a 1944 picture book by Marie Hall Ets. A boy walks through the forest and is joined by animals who follow behind him. The book was a recipient of a 1945 Caldecott Honor for its illustrations.
