= Jennie's Hat =

1971 picture book by Ezra Jack Keats

- Author: Ezra Jack Keats
- Illustrator: Ezra Jack Keats
- Language: English
- Genre: Children's picture book
- Publisher: Harper & Row
- Publication date: 1966
- Publication place: United States
- Media type: Hardback
- Pages: 40
- OCLC: 1150135916
- LC Class: PZ7.K2253 Je

Jennie's Hat is a 1966 children's picture book by American author and illustrator Ezra Jack Keats.

== Plot ==
The protagonist, a girl called Jennie, is looking forward to receiving a new hat from her aunt . “It will be big and beautiful and flowery,” she tells herself happily. But when the box arrives, there is only a plain straw hat inside. She is disappointed and tries different items on her head, like a flowerpot and a kettle but they don't work.

Jennie then goes to the park and looks at the birds which takes her mind off it for a while, but at church the next day she sees many women wearing lovely hats that remind her of her plain hat. However, on the way home Jennie's bird friends bring various items for her to decorate the hat so it isn't plain anymore.

== Reception ==
Jennie's Hat has proved popular amongst schools and libraries and has been used for encouraging children activities.
