= My Dog Is Lost =

1960 children's book by Ezra Jack Keats

- First edition
- Author: Ezra Jack Keats
- Illustrator: Ezra Jack Keats
- Genre: Children's picture book
- Publisher: Thomas Y. Crowell
- Publication date: 1960
- Publication place: United States
- Dewey Decimal: [E]

My Dog Is Lost is a 1960 children's picture book by American author and illustrator Ezra Jack Keats. My Dog is Lost was Keats' first attempt at authoring a children's book. Keats has authored and/or illustrated more than 85 books for children.

== Synopsis of story ==
Juanito and his family have just moved from Puerto Rico to New York City and he is miserable because he only speaks Spanish. Juanito has no one to talk with, and his dog Pepito is missing. Juanito realizes that his neighbors won't understand the Spanish passage - "Mi perro se ha perdido", so he goes to the bank and asks a man there to help him make a sign in English. Suddenly, the search is on as he and different children from all over New York help him search through Chinatown, Little Italy, Park Avenue and Harlem to find his lost dog, Pepito.

== See also ==
- Ezra Jack Keats
- Children's picture book
