= Lincoln House Club =

- U.S. National Register of Historic Places
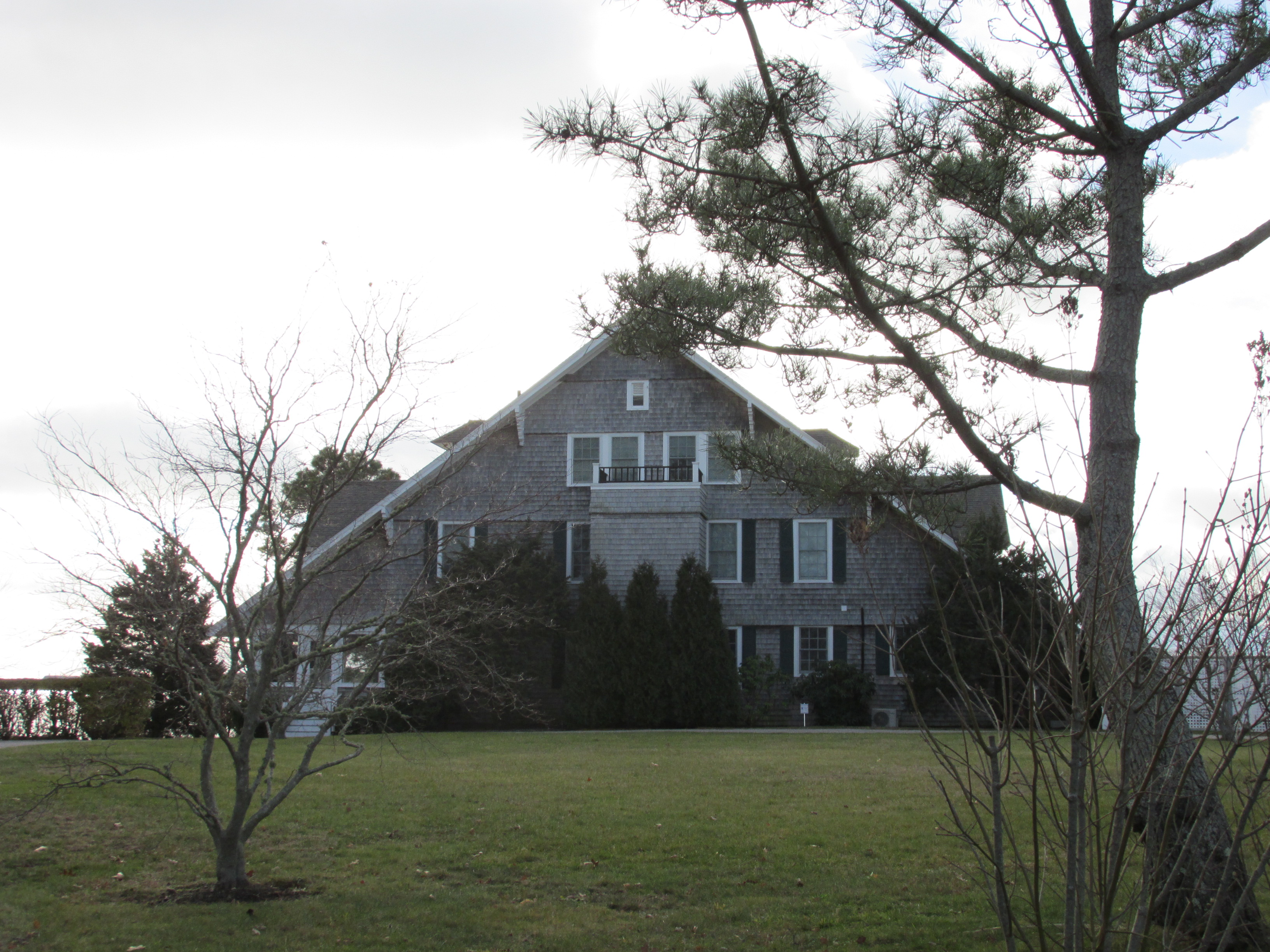
- 135 Bridge Street

- Location within Cape Cod Location within Massachusetts Location within the United States
- Location: 135 Bridge Street, Barnstable, Massachusetts
- Coordinates: 41°37′19″N 70°23′47″W
- Built: 1899
- Architectural style: Shingle Style
- MPS: Barnstable MRA
- NRHP reference No.: 87000301
- Added to NRHP: March 13, 1987

The Lincoln House Club is a historic building in the Osterville section of Barnstable, Massachusetts. The 2-3/4 story wood frame Shingle style structure was built in 1899 by the Lincoln Club of Boston, as part of a "fresh air" movement, and occupies a prominent site near the Grand Island Bridge. The building is distinctive for its tall yet low-angled gable roof with large brackets, within whose gables there are nearly two floors of usable space. The club used the building as a clubhouse and lodging facility until 1922, when it was sold and converted into a private residence.

The building was listed on the National Register of Historic Places in 1987.

== See also ==
- National Register of Historic Places listings in Barnstable County, Massachusetts
