= Will and Gladys Ahern =

American vaudeville duo

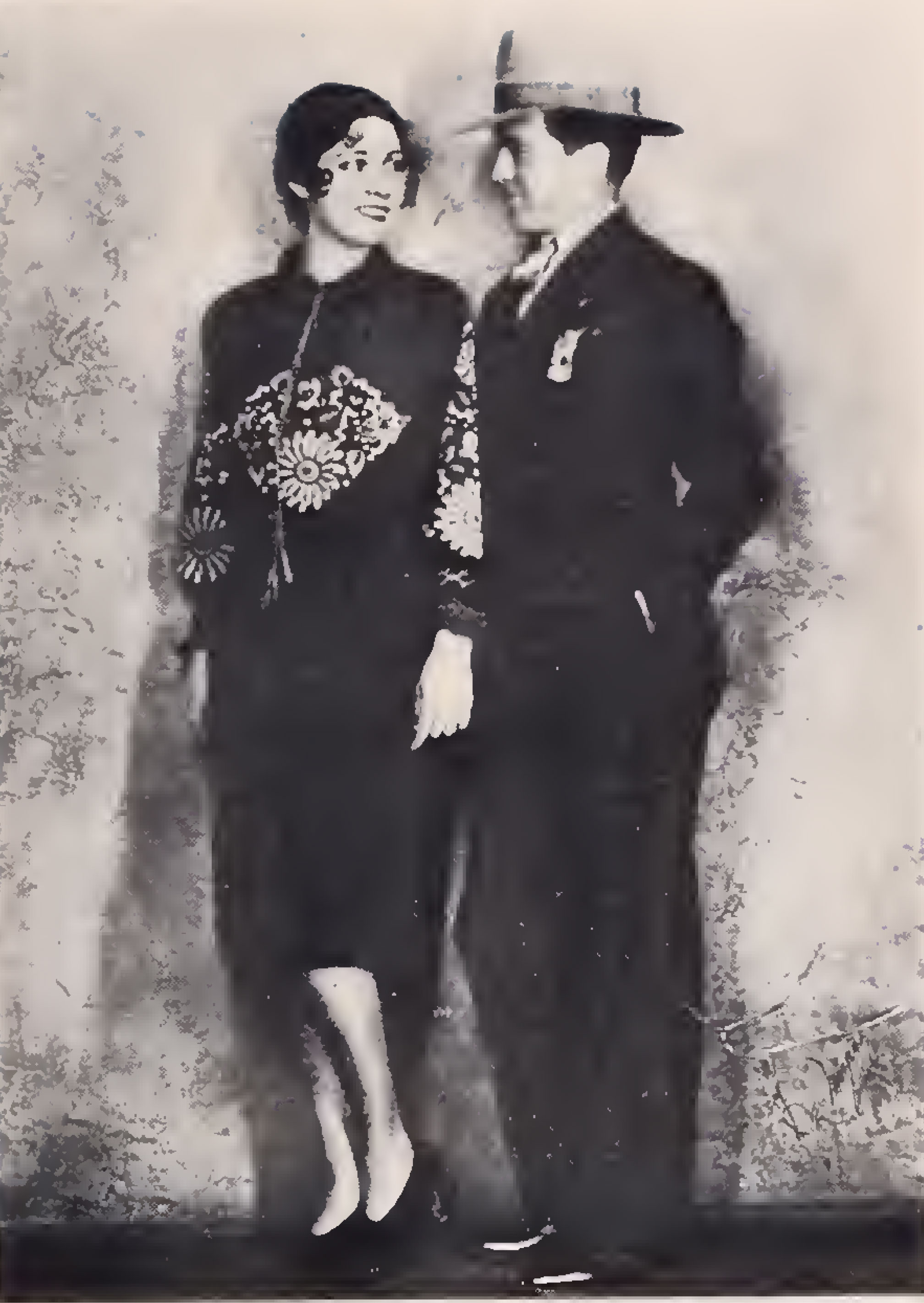
- Gladys & Will Ahern in a 1928 publicity photo

William James Ahern (October 9, 1896 – May 16, 1983) and Gladys Reese Ahern (January 4, 1903 – June 12, 1992) were an American vaudeville duo. As part of their act, Will told jokes and performed rope tricks while Gladys, using a Mexican accent, sang and danced.

== Early life ==
William James Ahern was born in Waterbury, Connecticut, on October 9, 1896. Ahern reportedly ran off with Buffalo Bill's Wild West troupe in 1909 after a local appearance, and learned rope spinning while working with the show. Gladys Reese was born in Sioux City, Iowa, on January 4, 1903.

== Performing career ==
Ahern's first performance was in 1913 at the Lyric Theater in Bridgeport, Connecticut. He did a comedic act featuring rope spinning. He subsequently worked in circuses and the Oklahoma Ranch and 101 Ranch shows doing trick riding and roping. He joined the Navy during World War I and performed in shows for Liberty Loan drives.

After World War I, Ahern and his partner, Joe O'Hare, performed a mind-reading act aboard the George Washington, a ship carrying U.S. delegates to Europe for the peace conference. After splitting up, Ahern performed solo until he met Gladys Reese in Chicago in 1919 and they formed an act. The Aherns' act consisted of Gladys dancing inside the open lasso Will twirled, as well as comedic song and dance numbers they performed together, in and out of the rope.

The Aherns spoke German, French, Italian, and Spanish, and performed for many years in Europe after American vaudeville became less popular, including appearances for soldiers during World War II. They also appeared in RKO studio shorts in the 1930s.

For many years, the Aherns operated Rainbow Studios, a rehearsal space one block north of Hollywood and Vine in Hollywood, California. Will was also active as a member and an officer in the Hollywood Comedy Club. His last stage appearance was in a 1980 production of Guys and Dolls.

== Later years ==
Will died May 16, 1983, at the age of 86. Gladys died in Burbank on June 12, 1992.
