= Whistle for Willie =

Children's book by Ezra Jack Keats

- First edition
- Author: Ezra Jack Keats
- Illustrator: Ezra Jack Keats
- Genre: Children's picture book
- Publisher: Viking
- Publication date: September 4, 1964
- Publication place: United States
- Pages: (unpaginated) 32
- OCLC: 155082
- Dewey Decimal: [E]

Whistle for Willie is a 1964 children's picture book by American author and illustrator Ezra Jack Keats.

== Plot ==
The protagonist, Peter, wants to be able to call his dog Willie by whistling. Although he cannot at first whistle he does not give up and eventually succeeds. The story also gives a little insight into Peter's daily life.

== Reception ==
Ann Marie Sammataro of Common Sense Media said that it 'celebrates a child's ingenuity'. Kirkus Reviews stated that 'the Caldecott prize winner has captured in words and eye-stopping pictures a big day in a small boy's life...'

== Film ==
In 1964, Jan Harvey narrated and played the characters in the cartoon film.
