= Edith M. Thomas =

American poet

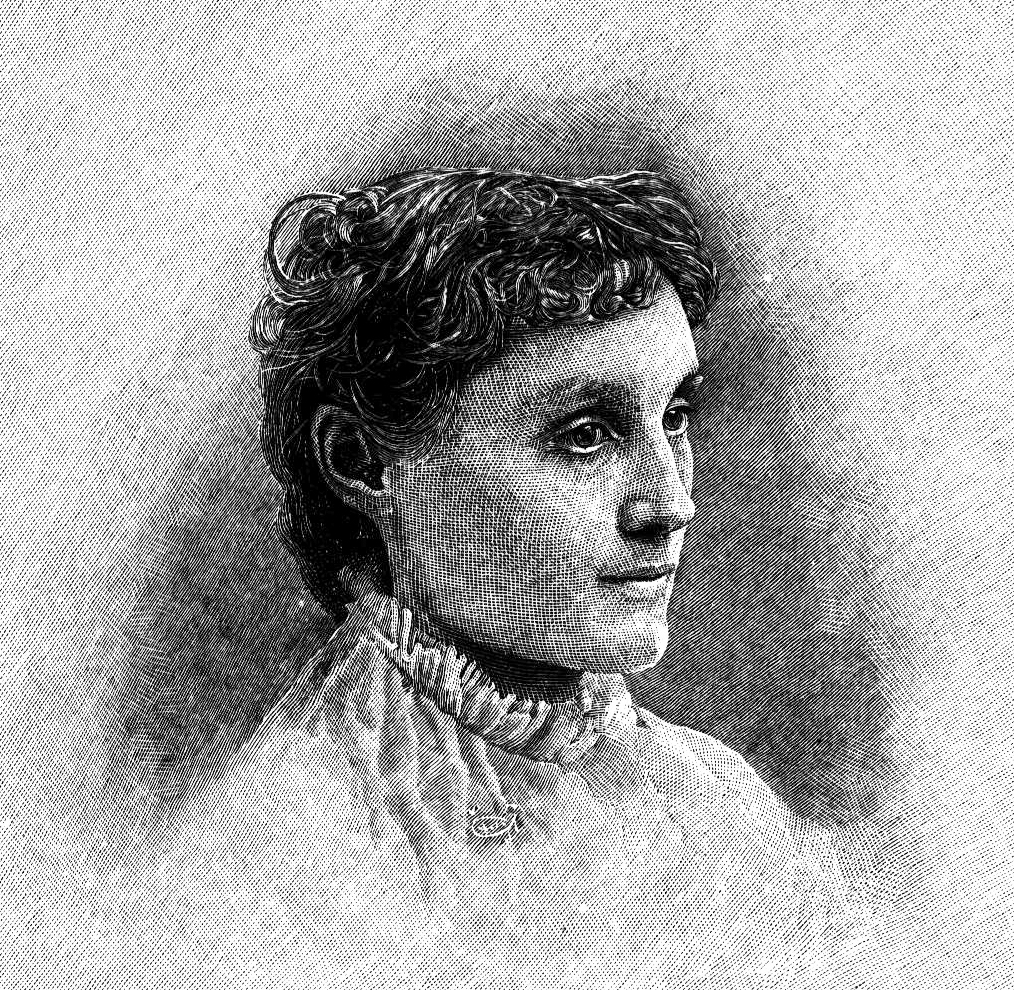
- Thomas sometime before 1891
- Born: Edith Matilda Thomas; August 12, 1854; Chatham Center, Ohio, US
- Died: September 13, 1925 (age 71); New York City, US
- Education: Oberlin College
- Occupation: Poet
- Writing career
- Language: English
- Notable works: Lyrics and Sonnets, The Inverted Torch, The Flower from the Ashes

Edith Matilda Thomas (August 12, 1854 – September 13, 1925) was an American poet who "was one of the first poets to capture successfully the excitement of the modern city."

== Life ==
Born in Chatham Center, Ohio, Edith Thomas was educated at the normal school of Geneva, Ohio, and attended Oberlin College (though she had to drop out). She taught school for two years, and then became a typesetter.

She began writing early for the local newspapers, then was encouraged by author Helen Hunt Jackson to send verse to more important periodicals. She "gained national attention with her poetry.... Scribner's, The Atlantic Monthly, The Century and other prominent magazines published her poems." Jackson's "enthusiasitic endorsement produced almost immediate literary celebrity."

In 1884, Canadian poet Charles G.D. Roberts wrote of her that "as far as I am aware her poems are not yet gathered in book form, and are therefore only to be obtained, few in number, by gleaning from the magazines and periodicals. Yet so red-blooded are these verses, of thought and of imagination all compact, so richly individual and so liberal in promise, that the name of their author is already become conspicuous.... We are justified in expecting much from her genius."

Her first volume appeared in 1885 entitled A New Year's Masque and Other Poems.

In 1887 she moved to New York City, where she worked for Harper's and Century Dictionary. She lived in New York for the rest of her life. She published over 300 poems between 1890 and 1909, although "the demands of the leading literary magazines constantly exceeded her supply."

On her death she was called "one of the most distinguished American poets” by The New York Times.

Her Selected Poems came out in 1926, a year after her death.

== Writing ==
Canadian poet Sir Charles G.D. Roberts wrote that "Miss Thomas’s work, in some of its best characteristics, recalls to me Shakespeare’s sonnets."

In Modern American Poetry, Louis Untermeyer called her "the author of some dozen books of verse, most of them lightly lyrical in mood, although a few of her poems have a more dramatic quality. The best of her work may be found in Lyrics and Sonnets (1887), The Inverted Torch (1890), and The Flower from the Ashes (1915).

Thomas acknowledged Helen Hunt Jackson as a major influence on her work.

The biographical dictionary Notable American Women says that "she drew her principal literary inspiration from the lyrics of John Keats. She was a classic poet in her prosodic regularity and in her continuing attention to Greek subjects. She was romantic in her emphasis on the self, although an aura of sentiment and pathos kept her from developing a constructive romantic position.... She was one of the first poets to capture successfully the excitement (the "ardent bulbs") of the modern city, and one of the most consistent in crying out against the inroads of the dollar sign on American culture."

== Publications ==
- A New Year's Masque and Other PoemsBoston: Houghton, Mifflin, & Co., 1885. Cambridge, MA: Riverside Press, 1885.
- The Round Year. Boston: Houghton, Mifflin, & Co., 1886.
- Lyrics and Sonnets. Boston: Houghton, Mifflin, & Co., 1887.
- Babes of the Year. New York: F.A. Stokes, 1888.
- Babes of the Nations. New York: F.A. Stokes, 1889.
- Heaven and Earth (1889)
- The Inverted Torch. Boston: Houghton, Mifflin, & Co., 1890.
- Fair Shadow Land. Boston: Houghton, Mifflin, & Co., 1893.
- In Sunshine Land. Boston: Houghton, Mifflin, & Co., 1895.
- In the Young World. Boston: Houghton, Mifflin, & Co., 1896.
- A Winter Swallow, With Other Verse. New York: Charles Scribner's Sons, 1896.
- The Dancers. Boston: R.G. Badger, 1903.
- Cassia, and other Verse. Boston: R.G. Badger, 1905.
- Children of Christmas. Boston: R.G. Badger, 1907.
- The Guest at the Gate. Boston: R.G. Badger, 1909.
- The Flower from the Ashes. Portland, ME: T.B. Mosher, 1915.
- The White Messenger, and Other War Poems. Boston: R.G. Badger, 1915.
- Selected Poems, ed. Jessie Belle Rittenhouse ed. New York, London: Harper Brothers, 1926.
