= Goggles! =

1969 picture book by Ezra Jack Keats

- Front cover, designed by Ezra Jack Keats
- Author: Ezra Jack Keats
- Illustrator: Ezra Jack Keats
- Cover artist: Ezra Jack Keats
- Genre: Children's picture book
- Publisher: Macmillan (New York)
- Publication date: 1969
- Publication place: United States
- Media type: Print (hardback)
- Pages: 36
- ISBN: 978-0-670-88062-1

Goggles! is 1969 children's picture book by American author and illustrator Ezra Jack Keats published by the Penguin Group in 1998. The book is about two boys finding motorcycle goggles. Goggles won a Caldecott Honor in 1970. The illustrations consist of mellow colors created using Keats' signature style of a combination of painting and collage.

== Plot ==
Peter, the main character, and his friend Archie find motorcycle goggles near their hideout. They encounter some "big boys" that want to take the goggles. They get a surprise from Peter's dog and end the day safe with the goggles.

== Characters ==
Peter: A young boy who found goggles.
Archie: A young friend of Peter who goes through the journey of getting the goggles back.
Willie: Peter's dog who helps the two friends out.

== Critical reception ==
Kirkus, which does not provide the names of its reviewers, gave Goggles! a lukewarm review, describing it as overly simple and less appealing than previous Peter books. The Kirkus review states, "For what amounts, then, to an everyday little boy escapade, Ezra Jack Keats' stunning collages are overqualified—which is another way of saying they're wasted. Except of course that they give you something to look at when you haven't much to think about."

Additionally, Ray Anthony Shepard included Goggles!, then Keats' most recent book, in a comparison of Keats' work to that of Black author John Steptoe, viewing Goggles! as the most extreme example of how a white outsider views Black communities: "The drawings for Goggles show Peter's world as if seen from inside a locked car with windows rolled up tight. Every illustration shout 'Look, see, we're in a ghetto.' By now, Peter's mommy has disappeared, and Peter and Archie are fighting to survive against a gang of older boys in an economically deprived world." The item over which Peter, Archie, and the older boys are fighting, however, is a pair of motorcycle goggles, more an object of fun than a daily necessity, so Shepard's description of the characters "fighting to survive" in an "economically deprived world" is not necessarily accurate. In 1974, the book was made into a film narrated by Geoffrey Holder and produced by Weston Woods Studios.
