= Ezra Jack Keats =

American children's writer and illustrator

- Keats, circa 1980
- Born: Jacob Ezra Katz; March 11, 1916; East New York, Brooklyn, New York, U.S.
- Died: May 6, 1983 (aged 67); Manhattan, New York, U.S.
- Occupations: Illustrator, writer
- Writing career
- Period: 1949-1983
- Genre: Children's picture books
- Notable work: The Snowy Day
- Notable awards: Caldecott Medal; 1963

Ezra Jack Keats (né Jacob Ezra Katz; March 11, 1916 - May 6, 1983) was an American writer and illustrator of children's books. He is best known for The Snowy Day, which won the 1963 Caldecott Medal and is considered one of the most important American books of the 20th century. He wrote 22 books and illustrated at least 70 more in his signature collage art style. Keats is known for introducing multiculturalism into mainstream American children's literature. Keats' works have been translated into some 20 languages, including Japanese, French, Danish, Norwegian, Spanish, Italian, Portuguese, Turkish, German, Swedish, Thai, Chinese, and Korean.

== Early life ==
Keats was born Jacob Ezra Katz on March 11, 1916, to a poor family in East New York, Brooklyn, the third child of Polish-Jewish immigrants Benjamin Katz and Augusta Podgainy. He made pictures out of whatever scraps of wood, cloth and paper that he could collect. Benjamin Katz, who worked as a waiter, discouraged his son's artistic tendencies and insisted that artists lived terrible, impoverished lives. Nevertheless, Keats's father sometimes brought home tubes of paint, claiming, "A starving artist swapped this for a bowl of soup."

Keats learned about art at the library and school. When he graduated from Junior High School 149, Keats received a medal for drawing that he kept his entire life. Keats attended Thomas Jefferson High School, where he won a national contest run by Scholastic for an oil painting depicting hobos warming themselves around a fire. At his graduation, in January 1935, Keats was to receive the senior class medal for excellence in art. Two days before the ceremony, Benjamin Katz died in the street of a heart attack. When Keats identified his father's body, he later wrote, "There in his wallet were worn and tattered newspaper clippings of the notices of the awards I had won. My silent admirer and supplier, he had been torn between his dread of my leading a life of hardship and his real pride in my work."

== Art career ==
For the remainder of the Great Depression, Keats took art classes and worked as a comic book illustrator and a mural painter under the Works Progress Administration. At Fawcett Publications, he illustrated backgrounds for the Captain Marvel comic strip. Keats was drafted for military service in World War II, and from 1943 to 1945, he designed camouflage patterns for the US Army Air Force. In 1947, Keats petitioned to legally change his name to Ezra Jack Keats, in reaction to the anti-Semitic prejudice of the time.

Keats spent most of 1949 painting and studying in Paris. After returning to New York, he focused on earning a living as a commercial artist. Keats' illustrations began to appear in Reader's Digest, The New York Times Book Review, Collier's and Playboy, and on the jackets of popular books. His work was displayed in Fifth Avenue store windows, and Keats had exhibitions at the Associated American Artists Gallery in 1950 and 1954.

== Books ==
Keats was asked to create children's books by Elizabeth Riley of Crowell, which published his first children's title, Jubilant for Sure, written by Elisabeth Hubbard Lansing, in 1954. To prepare for the assignment, Keats went to rural Kentucky, where the story takes place, to sketch. Many children's books followed, including the Danny Dunn adventure series, by Jay Williams and Raymond Abrashkin, and an ethnographic series by Tillie S. Pine and Joseph Levine, beginning with The Indians Knew. All told, Keats illustrated nearly 70 books written by other authors.

My Dog Is Lost was Keats' first attempt at writing his own children's book, co-authored with Pat Cherr, in 1960. The main character, Juanito, is an eight-year-old Spanish speaker newly arrived in New York City from Puerto Rico who has lost his dog. Searching throughout the city, he is helped by children in Chinatown, Little Italy, Park Avenue and Harlem. In this early work, Keats incorporated Spanish words into the story and featured minority children as central characters.

In 1962, Viking Press published The Snowy Day, which received the Caldecott Medal for the most distinguished picture book for children the following year. Keats wrote, "Then began an experience that turned my life around - working on a book with a black kid as hero. None of the manuscripts I'd been illustrating featured any black kids - except for token blacks in the background. My book would have him there simply because he should have been there all along." After years of illustrating books written by others, Keats found a voice of his own through Peter. The techniques that give The Snowy Day its unique look - collage with cutouts of patterned paper fabric and oilcloth; handmade stamps; spatterings of India ink with a toothbrush - were methods Keats had never used before. "I was like a child playing," he wrote. "I was in a world with no rules.". The Snowy Day was one of 22 books written and illustrated by Keats, and more than any other, became a classic of children's literature.

Peter appears in a total of seven books, during which he grows and matures: Whistle for Willie, Peter's Chair, A Letter to Amy, Goggles!, Hi, Cat!, and Pet Show!. Keats skillfully weaves into his plots a sense of the dilemmas and even dangers his protagonists face. In The Snowy Day, Peter, about four years old, yearns to join a snowball fight but learns he is too small when a stray snowball knocks him down. Later, Peter learns how to whistle (Whistle for Willie), to assume the role of older brother (Peter's Chair), to stand up to his friends when he invites a girl to his birthday party (A Letter to Amy), and to avoid the violence of a gang of older boys (Goggles!).

One of Keats' signature story elements is that the children in his books are consistently challenged with real problems that are recognizable to young readers; in solving them, the characters learn and mature. In a later series of four books beginning with Louie, Keats introduces a silent, lonely and brooding child who responds to a puppet during a puppet show with a joyous Hello! Louie lives largely in his imagination, constructing a diorama in a shoebox and escaping into it in The Trip, and building a spaceship out of detritus and traveling among the planets in Regards to the Man in the Moon. However, he is resilient enough to search for a candidate for a stepfather, and find one, in Louie's Search, and to learn to stand up to taunts from other children. Keats has said that Louie is the character he most related to, having felt invisible and unloved as a child and escaping through his creative pursuits.

Many of Keats' stories portray family life and the simple pleasures in a child's daily routine. Jennie's Hat illustrates the excitement of a child anticipating a present. Goggles! tells the story of boys finding a pair of goggles, and the chase that follows when a gang of bullies wants them, too. Keats drew on his own experiences growing up, often offering positive outcomes as an antidote to his unhappy childhood. Yet the particular events and environments in Keats' stories have an emotional resonance that children around the world have responded to. This was certainly his intention. Keats said, "I wanted The Snowy Day to be a chunk of life, the sensory experience in word and picture of what it feels like to hear your own body making sounds in the snow. Crunch...crunch...And the joy of being alive."

After The Snowy Day, Keats blended collage with gouache, an opaque watercolor mixed with a gum that produced an oil-like glaze. He marbled paper and worked with acrylics and watercolor, pen and ink and even photographs. The simplicity and directness of The Snowy Day gave way to more complex and painterly compositions, such as the expressionistic illustrations in Apt. 3.

In his evolution from fine artist to children's book illustrator, Keats applied influences and techniques that had inspired him as a painter, from Cubism to abstraction, within a cohesive, and often highly dramatic, narrative structure. His artwork also demonstrates an enormous emotional range, swinging from exuberant whimsy to deep desolation and back again.

Keats' last projects included designing the sets for a musical version of his book The Trip (which would later become the stage production Captain Louie), designing a poster for The New Theater of Brooklyn, and writing and illustrating a retelling of the folktale "The Giant Turnip."

After his death, the Ezra Jack Keats Foundation, which Keats had established in 1964, became active. Under the administration of his close friends Martin and Lillie Pope, the foundation was dedicated to preserving the quality of Keats' books and artworks, promoting children's literacy and creativity, and maintaining quality and diversity in children's literature. One of the Foundation's program is the Ezra Jack Keats Book Award. The Keats Archive, which includes original artwork and correspondence, is housed at the University of Southern Mississippi as part of the de Grummond Children's Literature Collection.

== Honors and memorials ==
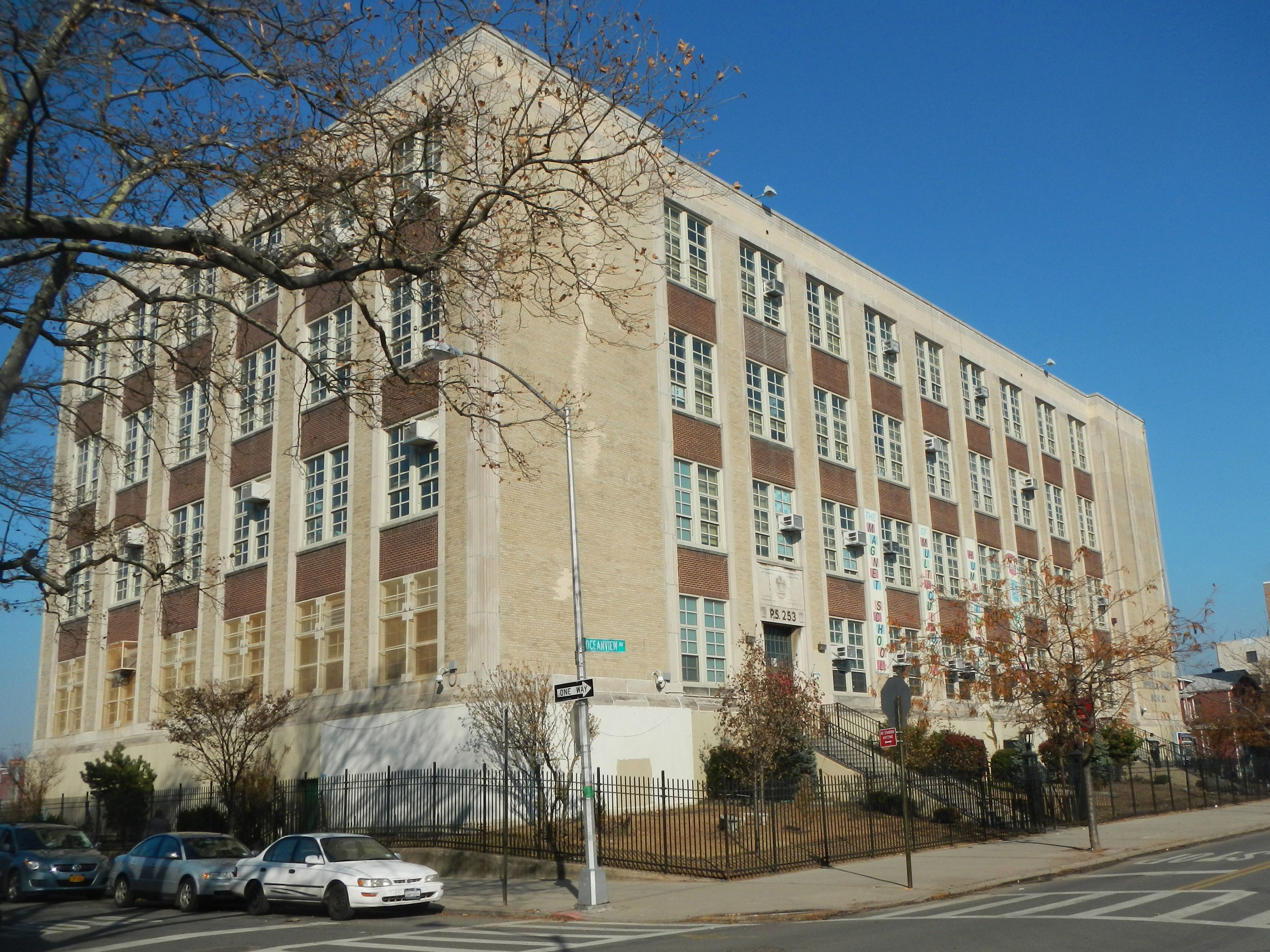
The Ezra Jack Keats Pre-K Center in Brooklyn, New York

Among the many honors Keats received for his 20-year contribution to children's literature are:

- The Snowy Day was awarded the Caldecott Medal and named one of the 150 most influential books of the 20th century by the New York Public Library.
- Keats was the first artist invited to design greeting cards for UNICEF.
- The Kiyose Skating Rink was named after Keats, in honor of his book Skates!.
- Keats was a member of the White House Forum on Child Development and the Mass Media and appeared on the celebrated PBS show Mister Rogers' Neighborhood several times; Sesame Street featured his book Peter's Chair, read aloud by First Lady Barbara Bush.
- Keats was awarded The University of Southern Mississippi Silver Medallion in 1980 during the Fay B. Kaigler Children's Book Festival as outstanding children's book author-illustrator.
- The city of Portland, Oregon, honored Keats with a parade, as did his readers in Tokyo, Japan.
- The Imagination Playground was set up by the Prospect Park Alliance in Brooklyn, New York, based on the characters from Keats' books. The centerpiece is a much visited bronze statue of Peter with his dog Willie, where a story hour takes place weekly in the summer.
- Public School 253 in Brooklyn was renamed the Ezra Jack Keats International School in 1997.
- In 2014, the Skirball Cultural Center in Los Angeles created a major retrospective of Keats' life and career. Outlets such as The Daily News, L.A. Weekly, and Time Out covered the exhibit. The National Endowment for the Arts also covered the exhibit on their Art Works blog.
- In 2017, the United States Postal Service created Forever stamps in honor of Keats' The Snowy Day. Outlets such as the Los Angeles Times, The New York Times, and The Washington Post covered the stamps' release.

== Personal life ==
On May 6, 1983, Keats died at New York Hospital following a heart attack. He was 67 years old. He never married and often said that his characters were his children.

== Bibliography ==
=== Books written and illustrated ===
- My Dog Is Lost (1960)
- The Snowy Day (1962) - Caldecott Medal winner
- Whistle for Willie (1964)
- John Henry, An American Legend (1965)
- Jennie's Hat (1966)
- Peter's Chair (1967)
- A Letter to Amy (1968)
- Goggles! (1969) - a Caldecott runner-up
- Hi, Cat! (1970)
- Apt. 3 (1971)
- Pet Show! (1972)
- Skates! (1973)
- Pssst! Doggie- (1973)
- Dreams (1974)
- Kitten for a Day (1974)
- Louie (1975)
- The Trip (1978)
- Maggie and the Pirate (1979)
- Louie's Search (1980)
- Regards to the Man in the Moon (1981)
- Clementina's Cactus (1982)
- One Red Sun, A Counting Book (1998)

=== Books adapted or compiled ===
- In a Spring Garden (edited by Richard Lewis, 1965)
- The Naughty Boy: A Poem (by John Keats, 1965)
- God is in the Mountain (1966)
- The Little Drummer Boy (by Katherine Davis, Henry Ohorati and Harry Simeone, 1968)
- Night (compiled by Ezra Jack Keats, photographs by Beverly Hall, 1969)
- Over in the Meadow (by Olive A. Wadsworth, 1971)

=== Books illustrated ===
- More than 85 books were illustrated by Keats, not including the titles which he helped to write and/or edit. Most of these illustrated works were completed before his debut as an author/illustrator.
