= The Guernsey Literary and Potato Peel Pie Society (film) =

2018 film by Mike Newell

- Theatrical release poster
- Directed by: Mike Newell
- Screenplay by: Kevin Hood; Don Roos; Tom Bezucha
- Based on: The Guernsey Literary and Potato Peel Pie Society by Mary Ann Shaffer and Annie Barrows
- Produced by: Paula Mazur; Mitchell Kaplan; Graham Broadbent; Peter Czernin
- Starring: Lily James; Michiel Huisman; Glen Powell; Jessica Brown Findlay; Katherine Parkinson; Matthew Goode; Tom Courtenay; Penelope Wilton; Nicolo Pasetti
- Cinematography: Zac Nicholson
- Edited by: Paul Tothill
- Music by: Alexandra Harwood
- Production companies: Blueprint Pictures; Mazur/Kaplan Company; Miracle Pictures
- Distributed by: StudioCanal
- Release dates: 9 April 2018 (London); 20 April 2018 (United Kingdom); 13 June 2018 (France)
- Running time: 124 minutes
- Countries: United Kingdom; France
- Language: English
- Box office: $23 million

The Guernsey Literary and Potato Peel Pie Society is a 2018 historical romantic drama film directed by Mike Newell and written by Kevin Hood, Don Roos and Tom Bezucha, based on the 2008 novel by Mary Ann Shaffer and Annie Barrows.

The film stars Lily James, Michiel Huisman, Glen Powell, Jessica Brown Findlay, Katherine Parkinson, Matthew Goode, Tom Courtenay and Penelope Wilton. Set in 1946, the plot follows a London-based writer who exchanges letters with a resident on the island of Guernsey, which had been under German occupation during World War II.

A co-production between the United Kingdom, United States, and France, the film was distributed and financed by StudioCanal and produced by Blueprint Pictures and the Mazur/Kaplan Company. In 2010, development began on a film adaptation based on Shaffer's novel. In October 2016, James signed on for the lead role, with Newell set to direct. The film entered pre-production in January 2017, with principal photography taking place across England from 23 March to 15 May 2017.

It was released in cinemas in the United Kingdom in April 2018 and in France in June 2018. The film grossed $15.7 million worldwide and received generally positive reviews from critics. It was distributed in other international areas by Netflix on 10 August 2018 as an original film.

== Plot ==
In 1941, on the island of Guernsey, four friends are stopped by soldiers for breaching curfew during German occupation. To avoid arrest, they say they were returning from a meeting of their book club, hastily named "The Guernsey Literary and Potato Peel Pie Society".

Five years later, in January 1946 in post-war London, author Juliet Ashton is promoting her latest book, written under her pen name Izzy Bickerstaff. She has just been contracted through her publisher and best friend Sidney Stark to write stories for The Times Literary Supplement about the benefits of literature.

Juliet receives a letter from Dawsey Adams, a Guernsey man who has come into possession of her copy of Charles Lamb's Essays of Elia and who wants help to find another book by the same author. He tells her that he is part of "The Guernsey Literary and Potato Peel Pie Society", which meets every Friday night. Juliet sends a book by Lamb and his sister, Tales from Shakespeare, in exchange for more information about the society and how it came into being.

Juliet decides she would like to write about the society so arranges to travel to the island, despite Sidney's reservations. Her American Army Major boyfriend Mark proposes before Juliet boards the ferry, and she accepts.

In Guernsey, Juliet attends a meeting of the society and is treated as a celebrity by the members: Dawsey Adams, Amelia Maugery, Isola Pribbey, Eben Ramsey, and Eben's young grandson, Eli. She is told that Elizabeth, the founding member, is overseas. Her daughter Kit is being looked after by Dawsey, and calls him "dad". Juliet asks permission to write an article about the society, but Amelia angrily rejects the idea.

Instead of returning home as planned, Juliet remains in Guernsey to conduct research, telling the group that she is writing about the German occupation. Over the following days, she learns that Elizabeth was arrested during the occupation and sent to Germany, but that her friends still hope for her return.

Juliet asks Mark to try to locate Elizabeth. Juliet's landlady tells her that Elizabeth was no saint, hinting that she had been having sex with the occupying German forces in exchange for luxuries.

Juliet asks Dawsey about the story, and he explains that he is not actually Kit's father. Her real father was Christian Hellmann, a German doctor who had worked with Elizabeth at the local hospital. He had been sent back to Germany, and died when his ship was sunk.

Mark arrives in Guernsey, and criticises Juliet for not wearing her engagement ring. Juliet relays to the society his news that Elizabeth had been sent to the Ravensbrück concentration camp. There, she was shot and killed trying to protect a fellow prisoner.

Juliet and Mark return to London but Juliet is unable to settle back into her previous life. She breaks up with him and starts to write about the society. When her manuscript is finished, she gives a copy to Sidney and posts another to the society, promising not to publish it.

Dawsey reads her covering letter out loud to the group and infers that Juliet has broken up with Mark. He decides to go to her, and departs for London. At the same time, she sets out for Guernsey. Juliet is just embarking on the ferry when she notices Dawsey on the wharf, and they reunite. He is about to ask Juliet to marry him when she interrupts to ask him the same thing. He accepts.

Some time later, Dawsey reads to Kit from Tales from Shakespeare with Juliet next to him, both wearing wedding rings. The society holds another meeting, including Sidney, exchanging excerpts from books and discussion.

== Cast ==
- Lily James as Juliet Ashton
- Michiel Huisman as Dawsey Adams
- Glen Powell as Mark Reynolds
- Jessica Brown Findlay as Elizabeth McKenna
- Katherine Parkinson as Isola Pribby
- Matthew Goode as Sidney Stark
- Tom Courtenay as Eben Ramsey
- Penelope Wilton as Amelia Maugery
- Bronagh Gallagher as Charlotte Stimple
- Nicolo Pasetti as Christian Helman
- Clive Merrison as Mr. Gilbert
- Bernice Stegers as Mrs. Burns
- Kit Connor as Eli Ramsey
- Florence Keen as Kit McKenna
- Andy Gathergood as Eddie Meares
- Stephanie Schonfield as First Audience Member

== Production ==
=== Development ===
In July 2010, producer Paula Mazur announced that a script based on the 2008 novel of the same name, written by Mary Ann Shaffer and Annie Barrows, had been picked up by Fox 2000 Pictures. Despite a lack of financial incentives, Mazur said that she wanted the adaptation to be filmed on the titular island of Guernsey, stating "It's all a matter of economics and what looks right, but I can't imagine not filming in Guernsey." Several actresses were mentioned as potential cast members, including Kate Winslet, Anne Hathaway, and Emily Blunt. On 4 August 2011, it was announced that Kenneth Branagh was set to direct the film, with filming aimed to commence in March 2012.

In January 2012 Winslet agreed to portray the lead role of Juliet Ashton. In April 2012, the film was delayed for another year due to scheduling conflicts. In February 2013, Winslet dropped out of the project, as did Branagh. In February 2016 Mike Newell was announced to direct the film, with Rosamund Pike "circling" the lead role. StudioCanal would finance and distribute the film. In October 2016, Lily James was confirmed to star as Juliet. In March 2017 Michiel Huisman and Glen Powell signed for the roles of Dawsey Adams and Mark Reynolds, respectively. The film entered pre-production in January 2017, with filming set to commence in spring.

=== Filming ===
Principal photography began in March 2017 in North Devon. The port and village of Clovelly in North Devon represented Saint Peter Port, Guernsey, and many other locations in the same area were used for outdoor shots representing Guernsey as imagined in 1946. Exterior shots were filmed at Princes Wharf, Bristol, to represent Weymouth Docks in 1946. For the London portion of the shoot, photography took place on Sicilian Avenue in London. Scenes were also shot at the House of Detention in Sans Walk, Clerkenwell and in the foyer of Senate House, London. Studio work was completed at Ealing Studios. Filming wrapped in May 2017, with the first official images of the film released that month.

== Release ==
The film had its world premiere in April 2018 at the Curzon Cinema in Mayfair, London., and was theatrically released in the United Kingdom in April and in France in June by StudioCanal. In March 2018, Netflix acquired distribution rights to the film for North and Latin America, Italy, Eastern Europe and Southeast Asia, releasing it as an original film on 10 August 2018.

=== Critical response ===
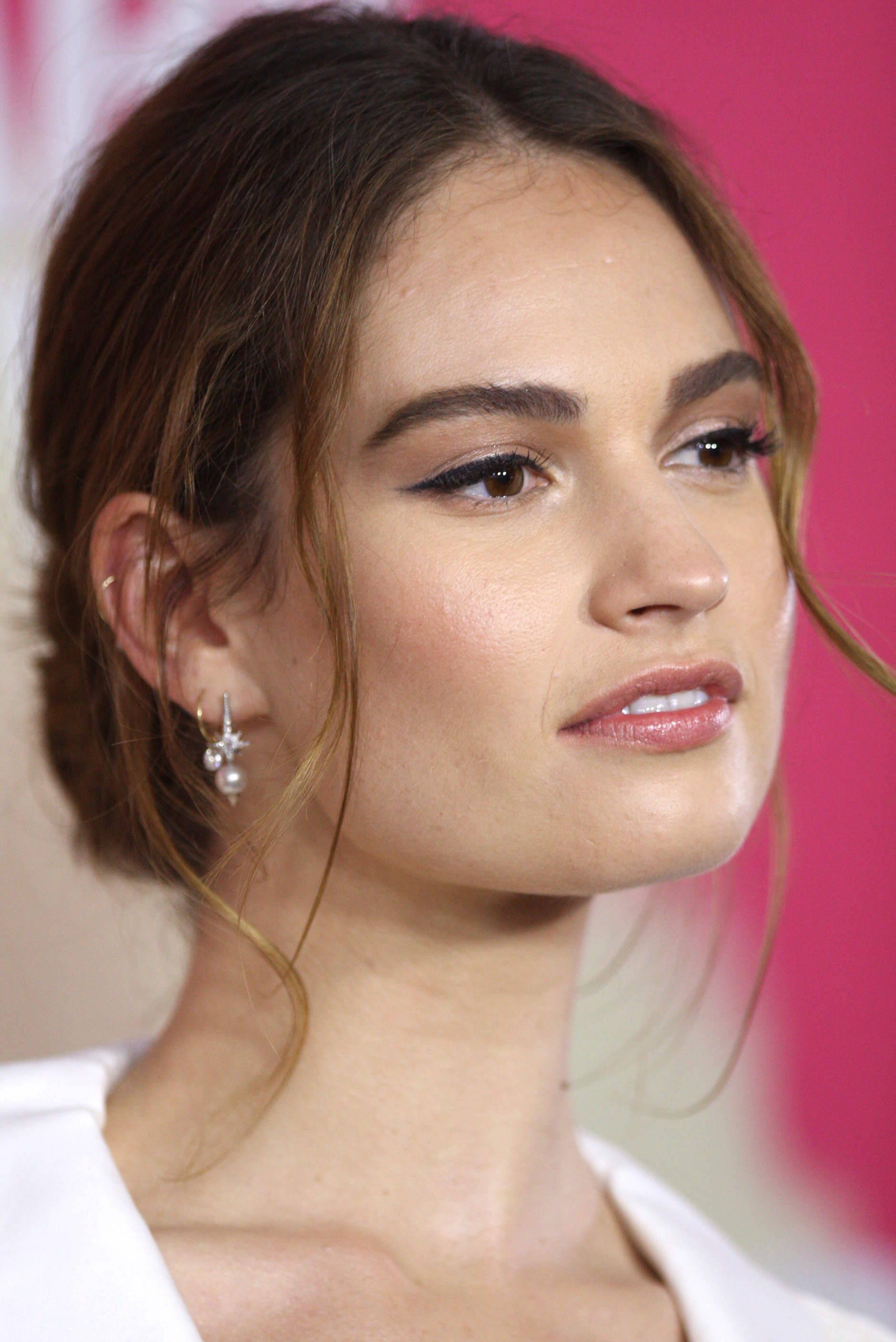
Lily James was praised for her lead performance as Juliet Ashton.

On review aggregator website Rotten Tomatoes, the film holds an approval rating of 81%, based on 73 reviews, and an average rating of 6.4/10. The website's critical consensus reads, "Far more traditional and straightforward than its unwieldy title, The Guernsey Literary and Potato Peel Pie Society offers delightful comfort food for fans of period drama." On Metacritic it has a weighted average score of 65 out of 100, based on 10 critics, indicating "generally favorable reviews".

Harry Windsor of The Hollywood Reporter gave the film a positive review, in particular praising Lily James and the film's modern tone saying, "Buoyed by a reliably appealing star turn from James, this handsome tearjerker mostly sidesteps the tweeness of its title to become, somehow, both an old-fashioned romance and a detective story trumpeting gender equality." Trevor Johnston of Radio Times awarded the film three out of five stars, calling it "moderately engrossing". He praised the "likeable" performances, in particular that of Penelope Wilton. Geoffrey McNab of The Independent also awarded three stars out of five, calling the film a "jaunty and good-natured affair". He concluded that "The result is a film that, while perfectly enjoyable on its own terms, becomes every bit as cosy, nostalgic and superficial as the title suggests it is going to be." Kevin Maher of The Times gave a very negative review, awarding one star. He called it "an inept and disingenuous froth-fest" and criticised the lack of chemistry between James and Michiel Huisman. Guy Lodge of Variety also gave a negative review, criticising the mystery plot as "neither particularly intriguing nor, as the rather straightforward investigation unfolds, terribly surprising". Olly Richards of Empire awarded three stars out of five, calling it "A well told, beautifully acted drama that offers nothing new but a comforting level of familiarity and cosiness." and noticing the film's "gentle" tone.

Robbie Collin of The Daily Telegraph praised the film as an "irresistible romantic mystery" and awarding four stars out of five. He also commended Newell's ensemble cast, particularly Katherine Parkinson, saying, "he gives each of his cast members just enough room to stretch: a broad gag here, a hushed monologue there, and in Parkinson’s case both at once." Anna Smith of Metro also gave the film four stars and praised the performances from Tom Courtenay and Parkinson as "classy". However, she considered the subplots too "clustered" and said that the film's two-hour runtime was too long. Peter Bradshaw of The Guardian awarded the film two out of five stars, calling it "naive" and "a glutinous 40s-period exercise in British rom-dram solemnity". Wendy Ide of The Observer also gave two stars, saying "even fans of the source novel ... might struggle with this photogenic but laboured adaptation." She also called the casting "hit-and-miss" and said that "the plodding storytelling relies on large chunks of exposition". Paul Whitington of The Irish Independent was more positive, awarding three stars; he considered the film to be a "gentle, meandering drama". David Bradley of The Adelaide Review gave a lukewarm review, awarding a score of 6 out of 10. He favourably compared it to a "Downton Abbey reunion" and praised James, saying, "she presents a luminous image of sheer British niceness that unfortunately never quite existed."
