= Rachel Vail =

American novelist

- Born: July 26, 1966 (age 60); New York City, U.S.
- Education: Georgetown University
- Writing career
- Genre: Young Adult

Rachel Vail (born July 25, 1966) is an American author of children's and young adult books.

== Life ==
She was born in Manhattan, grew up in New Rochelle, New York, and is a graduate of Georgetown University. Her debut novel Wonder won an Editor's Choice award from Booklist in 1991, and in 1992 her second novel, Do-Over, won that award also.

== Bibliography ==
=== Young adult novels ===
- Wonder (1991)
- Do-Over (1992)
- Ever After (1994)
- Daring to Be Abigail (1996)
- The Friendship Ring series
  - If You Only Knew (1998)
  - Please, Please, Please (1998)
  - Not That I Care (1998)
  - What Are Friends For (1999)
  - Popularity Contest (2000)
  - Fill in The Blank (2000)
- Never Mind: a Twin novel, co-written with Avi (2004)
- If We Kiss (2005)
- You, Maybe
- Lucky (2008)
- Gorgeous (2009)
- Brilliant (2010)
- Kiss Me Again (2013)
- Unfriended, Puffin Books, 2015. ISBN 9780147511546, OCLC 943282440
- Well, That Was Awkward, New York, New York : Puffin Books, 2017. ISBN 9780147513984, OCLC 1028048374

=== Chapter books ===
- Justin Case series
  - Justin Case: School, Drool, and Other Daily Disasters, illustrated by Matthew Cordell (2010) (Feiwel & Friends)
  - Justin Case: Shells, Smells, and the Horrible Flip-Flops of Doom, illustrated by Matthew Cordell (2012) (Square Fish)
  - Justin Case: Rules, Tools, and Maybe a Bully, illustrated by Matthew Cordell (2014) (Feiwel & Friends)
- Elizabeth Case series
  - A Is for Elizabeth, illustrated by Paige Keiser (2019) (Feiwel & Friends) ISBN 9781250162120
  - Big Mouth Elizabeth, illustrated by Paige Keiser (2019) (Feiwel & Friends) ISBN 9781250162175
  - Cat Ears on Elizabeth, illustrated by Paige Keiser (2020) (Feiwel & Friends) ISBN 9781250162205
  - Doodlebug Elizabeth, illustrated by Paige Keiser (2020) (Feiwel & Friends) ISBN 9781250162229

=== Children's picture books ===
- Over the Moon, illustrated by Scott Nash (1998)
- Sometimes I'm Bombaloo, illustrated by Yumi Heo (2001)
- Mama Rex & T series, illustrated by Steve Björkman (2000–2003)
  - Mama Rex & T: Lose a Waff
  - Mama Rex & T: Run out of Tape
  - Mama Rex & T: Turn off the TV
  - Mama Rex & T: Stay Up Late
  - Mama Rex & T: Homework Trouble
  - Mama Rex & T: The (Almost) Perfect Mother's Day
  - Mama Rex & T: The Horrible Play Date
  - Mama Rex & T: The Sort-of-Super Snowman
  - Mama Rex & T: The Prize
  - Mama Rex & T: Halloween Knight
  - Mama Rex & T: The Reading Champion
- Righty and Lefty, Illustrated by Matthew Cordell (2007)
- Jibberwillies at Night, illustrated by Yumi Heo (2008)
- Piggy Bunny, illustrated by Jeremy Tankard (2012) (Feiwel & Friends)
- Flabbersmashed About You, illustrated by Yumi Heo (2012) (Feiwel & Friends)
- Sometimes I Grumblesquinch, illustrated by Hyewon Yum (2022)

=== Short stories ===
- "Going Sentimental" in Places I Never Meant to Be: Original Stories by Censored Writers, edited by Judy Blume (1999)
- "One Hot Second" in One Hot Second: Stories about Desire, edited by Cathy Young (2002)
- "Thirteen and a Half" in Thirteen Stories That Capture the Agony and Ecstasty of Being Thirteen, edited by James Howe (2003)
- "The Crush" in Tripping Over the Lunch Lady and Other School Stories, edited by Nancy E. Mercado (2004)
