= Charles Lamb =

English essayist, poet, and antiquarian (1775–1834)

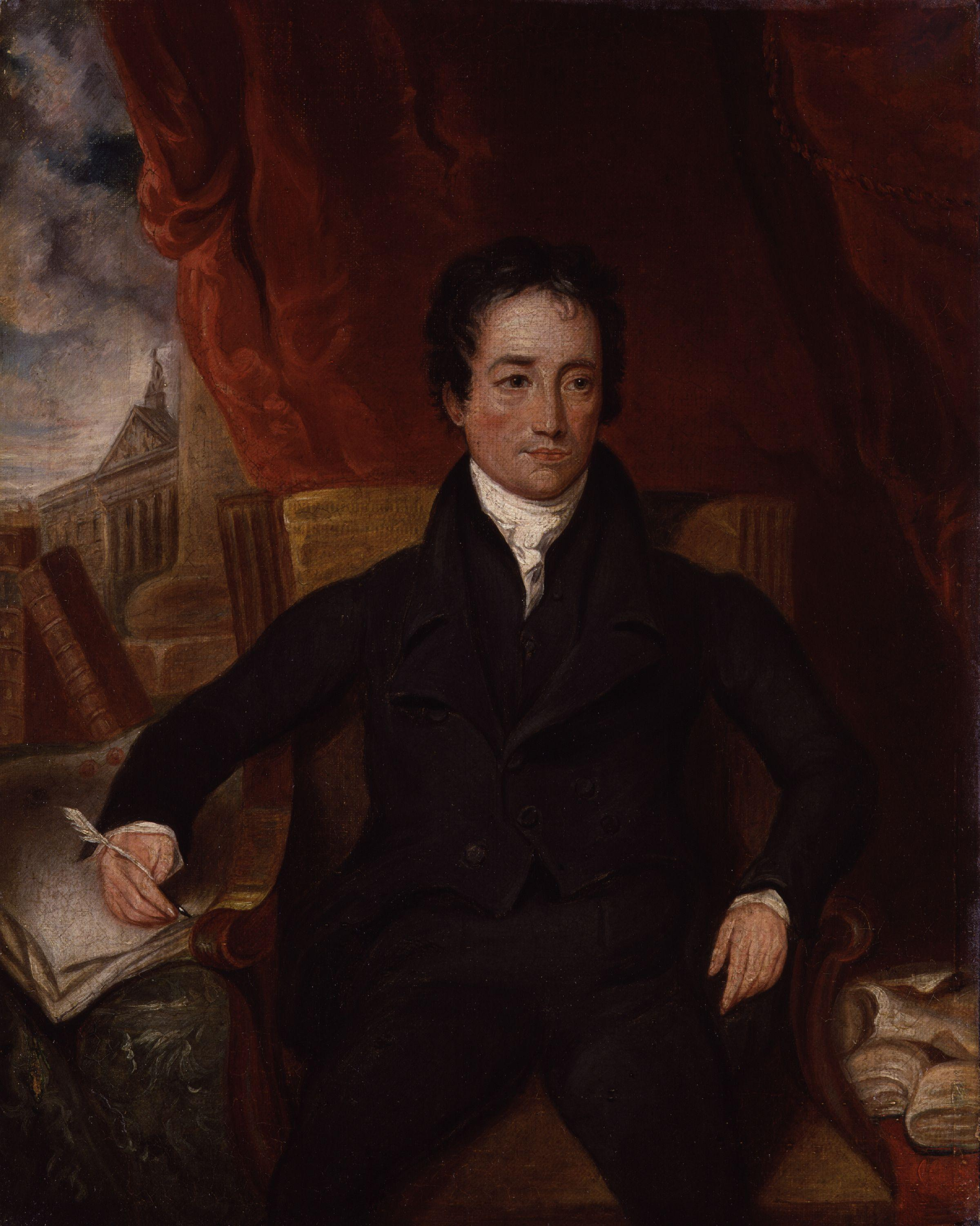
- Portrait by Henry Hoppner Meyer
- Born: 10 February 1775; Inner Temple, London, England
- Died: 27 December 1834 (aged 59); Edmonton, Middlesex, England
- Other name: Elia
- Occupations: Essayist, poet, antiquarian
- Known for: Essays of Elia; Tales from Shakespeare
- Relatives: Mary Lamb (sister)

Charles Lamb (10 February 1775 – 27 December 1834) was an English essayist, poet and antiquarian, best known for his Essays of Elia and for the children's book Tales from Shakespeare, co-authored with his sister, Mary Lamb (1764–1847).

Friends with such literary luminaries as Samuel Taylor Coleridge, Robert Southey, William Wordsworth, Dorothy Wordsworth and William Hazlitt, Lamb was at the centre of a major literary circle in England. He has been referred to by E. V. Lucas, his principal biographer, as "the most lovable figure in English literature".

== Youth and schooling ==
Lamb was born in London, the son of John Lamb (c. 1725 – 1799) and Elizabeth (née Field, died 1796). Lamb had an elder brother, also John, and a sister, Mary. Four other siblings did not survive infancy. Their father, John Lamb Sr. was a lawyer's clerk and spent most of his professional life as the assistant to barrister Samuel Salt, who lived in the Inner Temple in the legal district of London. It was there, in Crown Office Row, that Charles Lamb was born and spent his youth. Lamb created a portrait of his father in his "Elia on the Old Benchers" under the name Lovel.

Lamb was also cared for by his paternal aunt Hetty, who seems to have had a particular fondness for him. A number of writings by both Charles and Mary suggest that the conflict between Aunt Hetty and her sister-in-law created a certain degree of tension in the Lamb household. However, Charles speaks fondly of her and her presence in the house seemed to have brought a great deal of comfort to him. Some of Lamb's fondest childhood memories were of time spent with Mrs Field, his maternal grandmother, who was for many years a servant to the Plumer family, who owned a large country house called Blakesware, near Widford, Hertfordshire. After the death of Mrs Plumer, Lamb's grandmother was in sole charge of the large home and, as William Plumer was often absent, Charles had free rein of the place during his visits. A picture of these visits can be glimpsed in the Elia essay Blakesmoor in H—shire.

Why, every plank and panel of that house for me had magic in it. The tapestried bed-rooms—tapestry so much better than painting—not adorning merely, but peopling the wainscots—at which childhood ever and anon would steal a look, shifting its coverlid (replaced as quickly) to exercise its tender courage in a momentary eye-encounter with those stern bright visages, staring reciprocally—all Ovid on the walls, in colours vivider than his descriptions.

Little is known about Charles's life before he was seven other than that Mary taught him to read at a very early age and he read voraciously. It is believed that he had smallpox during his early years, which forced him into a long period of convalescence. After this period of recovery Lamb began to take lessons from Mrs Reynolds, a woman who lived in the Temple and is believed to have been the former wife of a lawyer. Mrs Reynolds must have been a sympathetic schoolmistress because Lamb maintained a relationship with her throughout his life and she is known to have attended dinner parties held by Mary and Charles in the 1820s. E. V. Lucas suggests that sometime in 1781 Charles left Mrs Reynolds and began to study at the Academy of William Bird.

His time with William Bird did not last long, however, because by October 1782 Lamb was enrolled in Christ's Hospital, a charity boarding school chartered by King Edward VI in 1553. A thorough record of Christ's Hospital is to be found in several essays by Lamb as well as The Autobiography of Leigh Hunt and the Biographia Literaria of Samuel Taylor Coleridge, with whom Charles developed a friendship that would last for their entire lives. Despite the school's brutality, Lamb got along well there, due in part, perhaps, to the fact that his home was not far distant, thus enabling him, unlike many other boys, to return often to its safety. Years later, in his essay "Christ's Hospital Five and Thirty Years Ago", Lamb described these events, speaking of himself in the third person as "L".

"I remember L. at school; and can well recollect that he had some peculiar advantages, which I and other of his schoolfellows had not. His friends lived in town, and were near at hand; and he had the privilege of going to see them, almost as often as he wished, through some invidious distinction, which was denied to us."

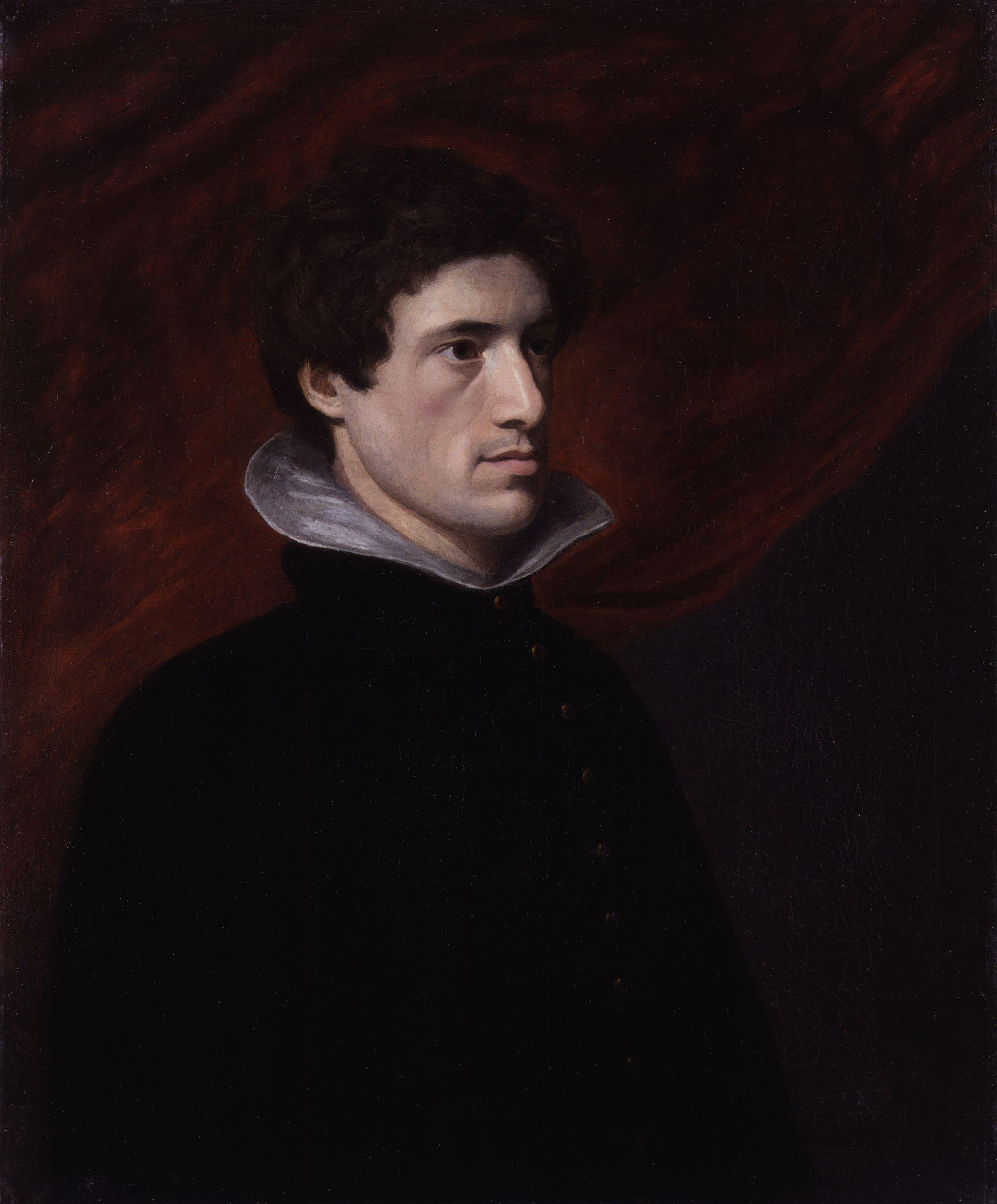
Portrait of Charles Lamb by William Hazlitt, 1804

Christ's Hospital was a typical English boarding school and many students later wrote of the terrible violence they suffered there. The upper master (i.e. principal or headteacher) of the school from 1778 to 1799 was Reverend James Boyer, a man renowned for his unpredictable and capricious temper. In one famous story Boyer was said to have knocked one of Leigh Hunt's teeth out by throwing a copy of Homer at him from across the room. Lamb seemed to have escaped much of this brutality, in part because of his amiable personality and in part because Samuel Salt, his father's employer and Lamb's sponsor at the school, was one of the institute's governors.

Charles Lamb had a stutter and this "inconquerable impediment" in his speech deprived him of Grecian status at Christ's Hospital, thus disqualifying him for a clerical career. While Coleridge and other scholarly boys were able to go on to Cambridge, Lamb left school at fourteen and was forced to find a more prosaic career. For a short time he worked in the office of Joseph Paice, a London merchant, and then, for 23 weeks, until 8 February 1792, held a small post in the Examiner's Office of the South Sea House. Its subsequent downfall in a pyramid scheme after Lamb left would be contrasted to the company's prosperity in the first Elia essay. On 5 April 1792 he went to work in the Accountant's Office for the British East India Company, the death of his father's employer having ruined the family's fortunes. Charles would continue to work there for 25 years, until his retirement with pension (the "superannuation" he refers to in the title of one essay).

In 1792 while tending to his grandmother, Mary Field, in Hertfordshire, Charles Lamb fell in love with a young woman named Ann Simmons. Although no epistolary record exists of the relationship between the two, Lamb seems to have spent years wooing her. The record of the love exists in several accounts of Lamb's writing. "Rosamund Gray" is a story of a young man named Allen Clare who loves Rosamund Gray but their relationship comes to nothing because of her sudden death. Miss Simmons also appears in several Elia essays under the name "Alice M". The essays "Dream Children", "New Year's Eve", and several others, speak of the many years that Lamb spent pursuing his love that ultimately failed. Miss Simmons eventually went on to marry a silversmith and Lamb called the failure of the affair his "great disappointment".

== Family tragedy ==
Both Charles and his sister Mary had a period of mental illness. As he himself confessed in a letter, Charles spent six weeks in a mental facility during 1795:

Coleridge, I know not what suffering scenes you have gone through at Bristol. My life has been somewhat diversified of late. The six weeks that finished last year and began this your very humble servant spent very agreeably in a mad house at Hoxton—I am got somewhat rational now, and don't bite any one. But mad I was—and many a vagary my imagination played with me, enough to make a volume if all told. My Sonnets I have extended to the number of nine since I saw you, and will some day communicate to you.

— Lamb to Coleridge; 27 May 1796.

Mary Lamb's illness was more severe than her brother's, and it led her to become aggressive on a fatal occasion. On 22 September 1796, while preparing dinner, Mary became angry with her apprentice, roughly shoving the little girl out of her way and pushing her into another room. Her mother, Elizabeth, began admonishing her for this, and Mary had a mental breakdown. She took the kitchen knife she had been holding, unsheathed it, and approached her mother, who was sitting down. Mary, "worn down to a state of extreme nervous misery by attention to needlework by day and to her mother at night", was seized with acute mania and stabbed her mother in the heart with a table knife. Charles ran into the house soon after the murder and took the knife out of Mary's hand.

Later in the evening, Charles found a local place for Mary in a private mental facility called Fisher House, which had been found with the help of a doctor friend of his. While reports were published by the media, Charles wrote a letter to Samuel Taylor Coleridge in connection to the matricide:

MY dearest friend – White or some of my friends or the public papers by this time may have informed you of the terrible calamities that have fallen on our family. I will only give you the outlines. My poor dear dearest sister in a fit of insanity has been the death of her own mother. I was at hand only time enough to snatch the knife out of her grasp. She is at present in a mad house, from whence I fear she must be moved to an hospital. God has preserved to me my senses, – I eat and drink and sleep, and have my judgment I believe very sound. My poor father was slightly wounded, and I am left to take care of him and my aunt. Mr Norris of the Bluecoat school has been very very kind to us, and we have no other friend, but thank God I am very calm and composed, and able to do the best that remains to do. Write, —as religious a letter as possible— but no mention of what is gone and done with. —With me "the former things are passed away," and I have something more to do that [than] to feel. God almighty have us all in his keeping.

— Lamb to Coleridge. 27 September 1796

Charles took over responsibility for Mary after refusing his brother John's suggestion that they have her committed to a public lunatic asylum. Lamb used a large part of his relatively meagre income to keep his beloved sister in the private "madhouse" in Islington. With the help of friends, Lamb succeeded in obtaining his sister's release from what would otherwise have been lifelong imprisonment. Although there was no legal status of "insanity" at the time, the jury returned the verdict of "lunacy" which was how she was freed from guilt of willful murder, on the condition that Charles take personal responsibility for her safekeeping.

The 1799 death of John Lamb was something of a relief to Charles because his father had been mentally incapacitated for a number of years since having a stroke. The death of his father also meant that Mary could come to live again with him in Pentonville, and in 1800 they set up a shared home at Mitre Court Buildings in the Temple, where they would live until 1809.

In 1800, Mary's illness returned and Charles had to take her back again to the asylum. In those days, Charles sent a letter to Coleridge, in which he admitted he felt melancholic and lonely, adding "I almost wish that Mary were dead."

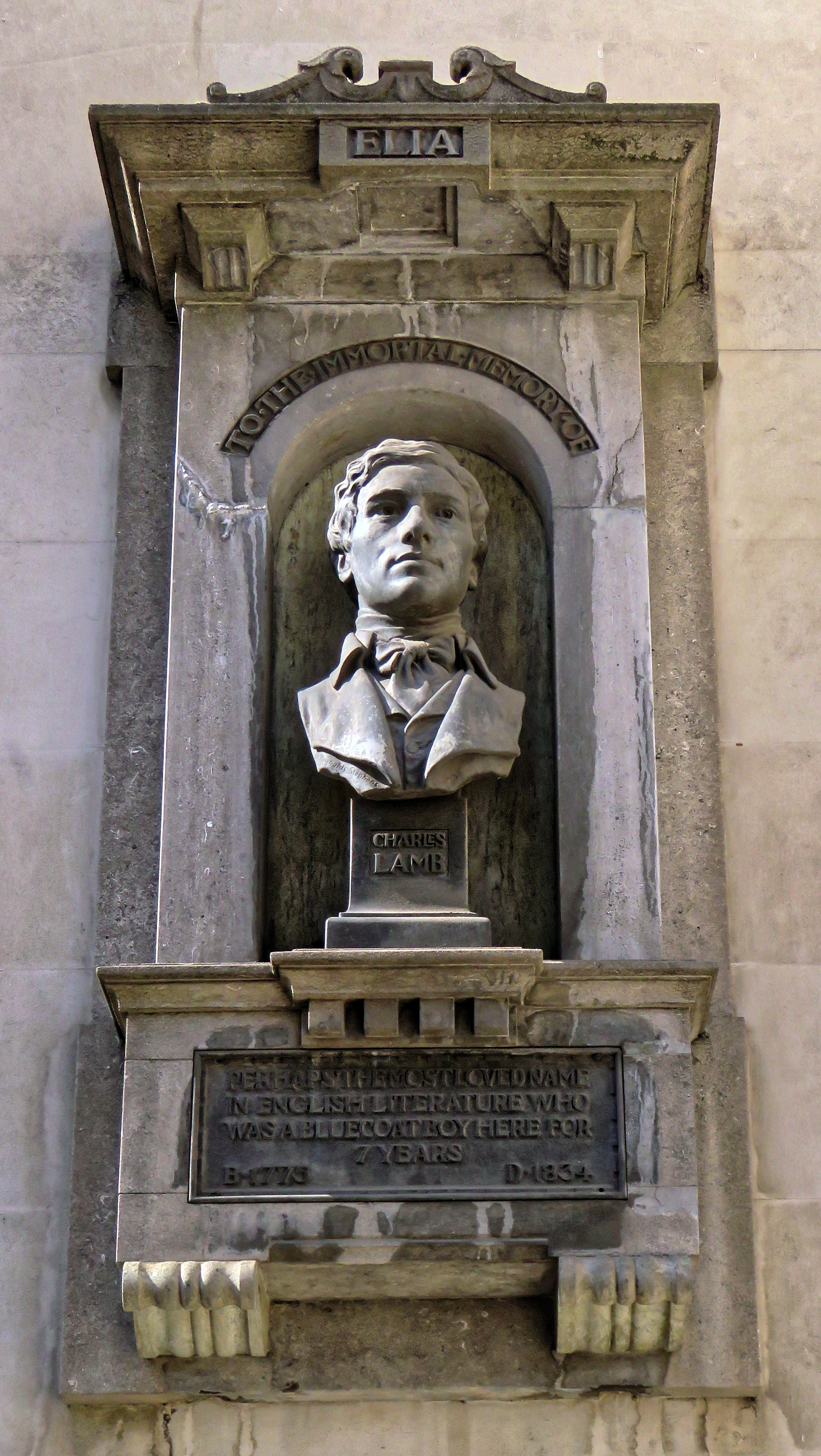
Memorial to Charles Lamb at Watch House in Giltspur Street, London

Later she would come back, and both he and his sister would enjoy an active and rich social life. Their London quarters became a kind of weekly salon for many of the most outstanding theatrical and literary figures of the day. In 1869, a club, The Lambs, was formed in London to carry on their salon tradition. The actor Henry James Montague founded the club's New York counterpart in 1874.

Charles Lamb, having been to school with Samuel Coleridge, counted Coleridge as perhaps his closest, and certainly his oldest, friend. On his deathbed, Coleridge had a mourning ring sent to Lamb and his sister. Fortuitously, Lamb's first publication was in 1796, when four sonnets by "Mr Charles Lamb of the India House" appeared in Coleridge's Poems on Various Subjects. In 1797 he contributed additional blank verse to the second edition, and met the Wordsworths, William and Dorothy, on his short summer holiday with Coleridge at Nether Stowey, thereby also striking up a lifelong friendship with William. In London, Lamb became familiar with a group of young writers who favoured political reform, including Percy Bysshe Shelley, William Hazlitt, Leigh Hunt and William Hone.

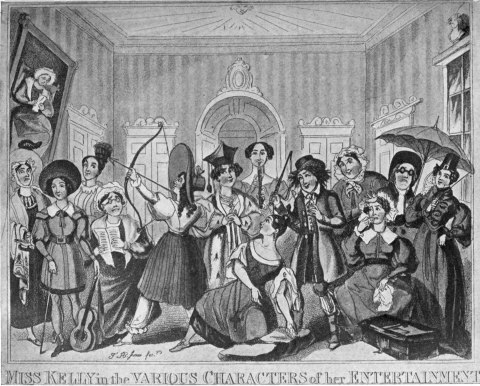
Fanny Kelly "Entertains" from "The Works of Charles Lamb". The original caption said "Mr Lamb having taken the liberty of addressing a slight compliment to Miss Kelly in his first volume, respectfully requests her acceptance of the collection. 7 June 1818."

Lamb continued to clerk for the East India Company and doubled as a writer in various genres, his tragedy, John Woodvil, being published in 1802. His farce, Mr H, was performed at Drury Lane in 1807, where it was roundly booed. In the same year, Tales from Shakespeare (Charles handled the tragedies; his sister Mary, the comedies) was published, and became a best seller for William Godwin's "Children's Library".

On 20 July 1819, at age 44, Lamb, who, because of family commitments, had never married, fell in love with an actress, Fanny Kelly, of Covent Garden, and besides writing her a sonnet he also proposed marriage. She refused him, and he died a bachelor.

His collected essays, under the title Essays of Elia, were published in 1823 ("Elia" being the pen name Lamb used as a contributor to The London Magazine).

The Essays of Elia would be criticised in the Quarterly Review (January 1823) by Robert Southey, who thought its author to be irreligious. When Charles read the review, entitled "The Progress of Infidelity", he was filled with indignation, and wrote a letter to his friend Bernard Barton, where Lamb declared he hated the review, and emphasised that his words "meant no harm to religion". First, Lamb did not want to retort, since he actually admired Southey; but later he felt the need to write a letter "Elia to Southey", in which he complained and expressed that the fact that he was a dissenter of the Church, did not make him an irreligious man. The letter would be published in The London Magazine, in October 1823:

Rightly taken, Sir, that Paper was not against Graces, but Want of Grace; not against the ceremony, but the carelessness and slovenliness so often observed in the performance of it. . . You have never ridiculed, I believe, what you thought to be religion, but you are always girding at what some pious, but perhaps mistaken folks, think to be so.

— Charles Lamb, "Letter of Elia to Robert Southey, Esquire"

A further collection called The Last Essays of Elia was published in 1833, shortly before Lamb's death. Also, in 1834, Samuel Coleridge died. The funeral was confined only to the family of the writer, so Lamb was prevented from attending and only wrote a letter to Rev. James Gilman, Coleridge's physician and close friend, expressing his condolences.

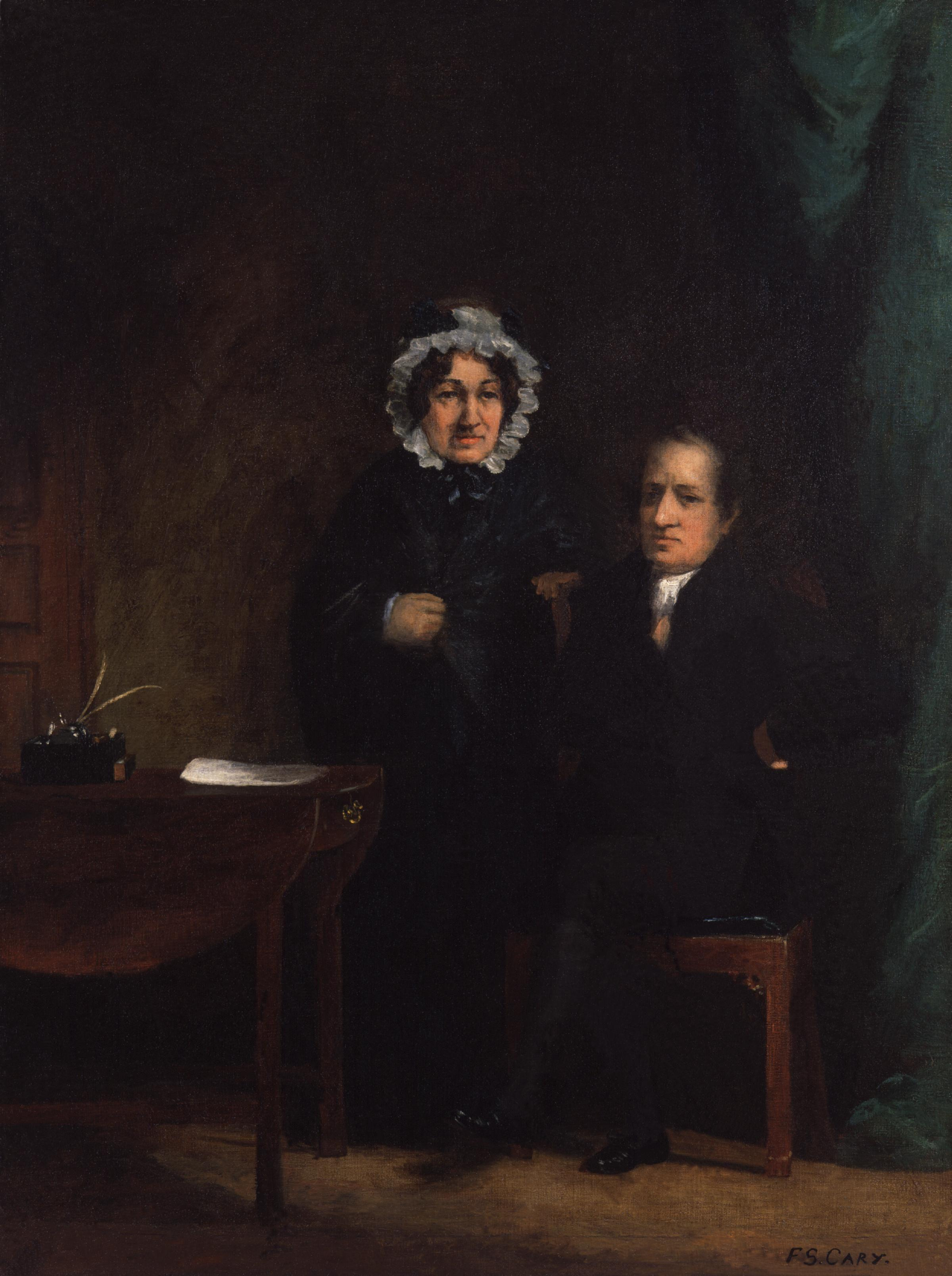
Francis Stephen Cary, Portrait of Mary and Charles Lamb (1834)

On 27 December 1834, Lamb died of a streptococcal infection, erysipelas, contracted from a minor graze on his face sustained after slipping in the street; he was 59. From 1833 until their deaths, Charles and Mary lived at Bay Cottage, Church Street, Edmonton, north of London (now part of the London Borough of Enfield). Lamb is buried in All Saints' Churchyard, Edmonton. His sister, who was ten years his senior, survived him by more than a dozen years. She is buried beside him.

== Work ==
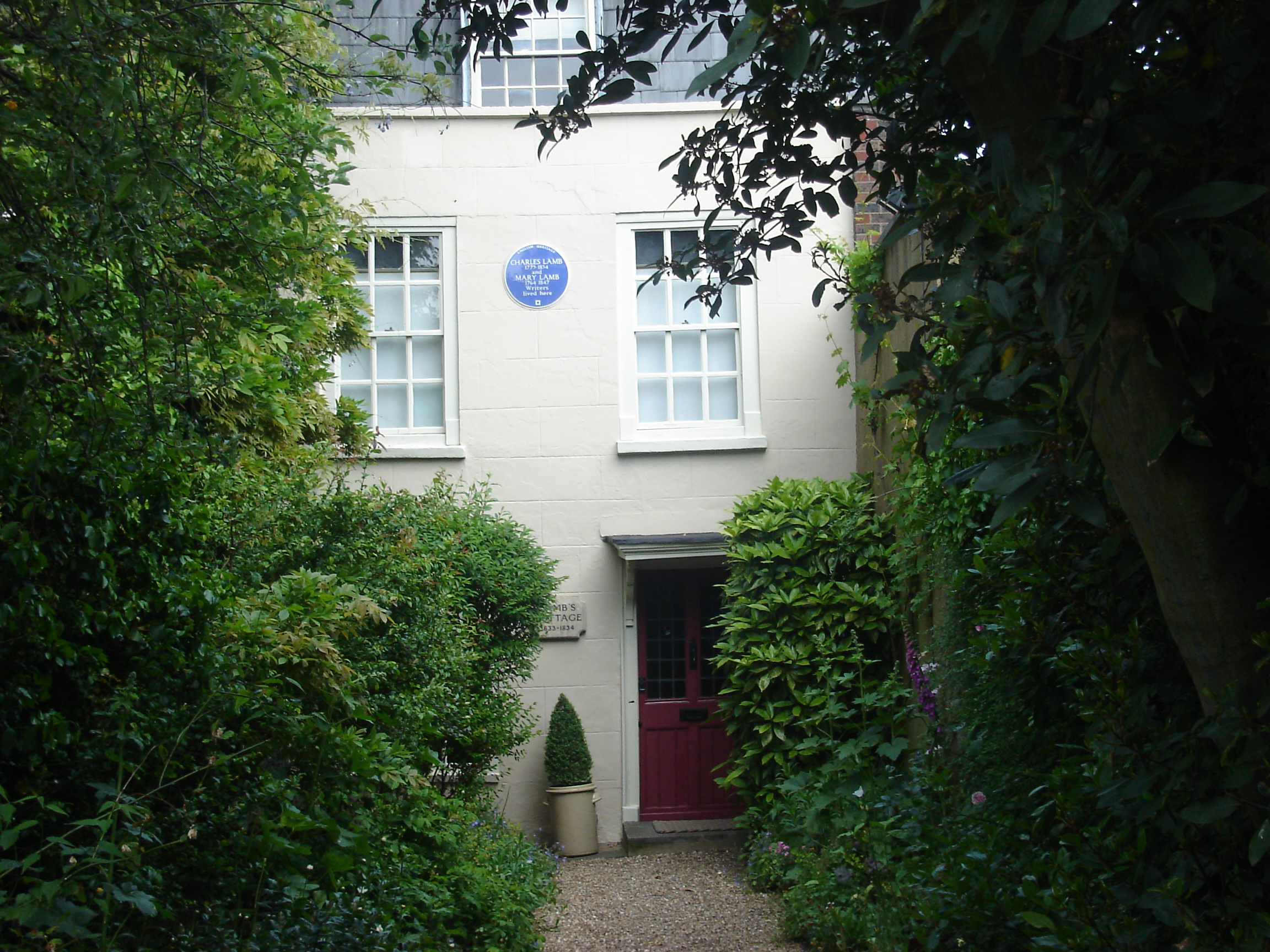
Lamb's cottage, Edmonton, London

Lamb's first publication was the inclusion of four sonnets in Coleridge's Poems on Various Subjects, published in 1796 by Joseph Cottle. The sonnets were significantly influenced by the poems of Burns and the sonnets of William Bowles, a largely forgotten poet of the late 18th century. Lamb's poems garnered little attention and are seldom read today. As he himself came to realise, he was a much more talented prose stylist than poet. Indeed, one of the most celebrated poets of the day—William Wordsworth—wrote to John Scott as early as 1815 that Lamb "writes prose exquisitely"—and this was five years before Lamb began The Essays of Elia for which he is now most famous.

Notwithstanding, Lamb's contributions to Coleridge's second edition of the Poems on Various Subjects showed significant growth as a poet. These poems included The Tomb of Douglas and A Vision of Repentance. Because of a temporary falling out with Coleridge, Lamb's poems were to be excluded in the third edition of the Poems though as it turned out a third edition never emerged. Instead, Coleridge's next publication was the monumentally influential Lyrical Ballads co-published with Wordsworth. Lamb, on the other hand, published a book entitled Blank Verse with Charles Lloyd, the mentally unstable son of the founder of Lloyds Bank. Lamb's most famous poem was written at this time and entitled "The Old Familiar Faces". Like most of Lamb's poems, it is unabashedly sentimental, and perhaps for this reason it is still remembered and widely read today, being often included in anthologies of British and Romantic period poetry. Of particular interest to Lambarians is the opening verse of the original version of "The Old Familiar Faces", which is concerned with Lamb's mother, whom Mary Lamb killed. It was a verse that Lamb chose to remove from the edition of his Collected Work published in 1818:

I had a mother, but she died, and left me,
Died prematurely in a day of horrors –
All, all are gone, the old familiar faces.

In the final years of the 18th century, Lamb began to work on prose, first in a novella entitled Rosamund Gray, which tells the story of a young girl whose character is thought to be based on Ann Simmons, an early love interest. Although the story is not particularly successful as a narrative because of Lamb's poor sense of plot, it was well thought of by Lamb's contemporaries and led Shelley to observe, "what a lovely thing is Rosamund Gray! How much knowledge of the sweetest part of our nature in it!" (Quoted in Barnett, page 50)

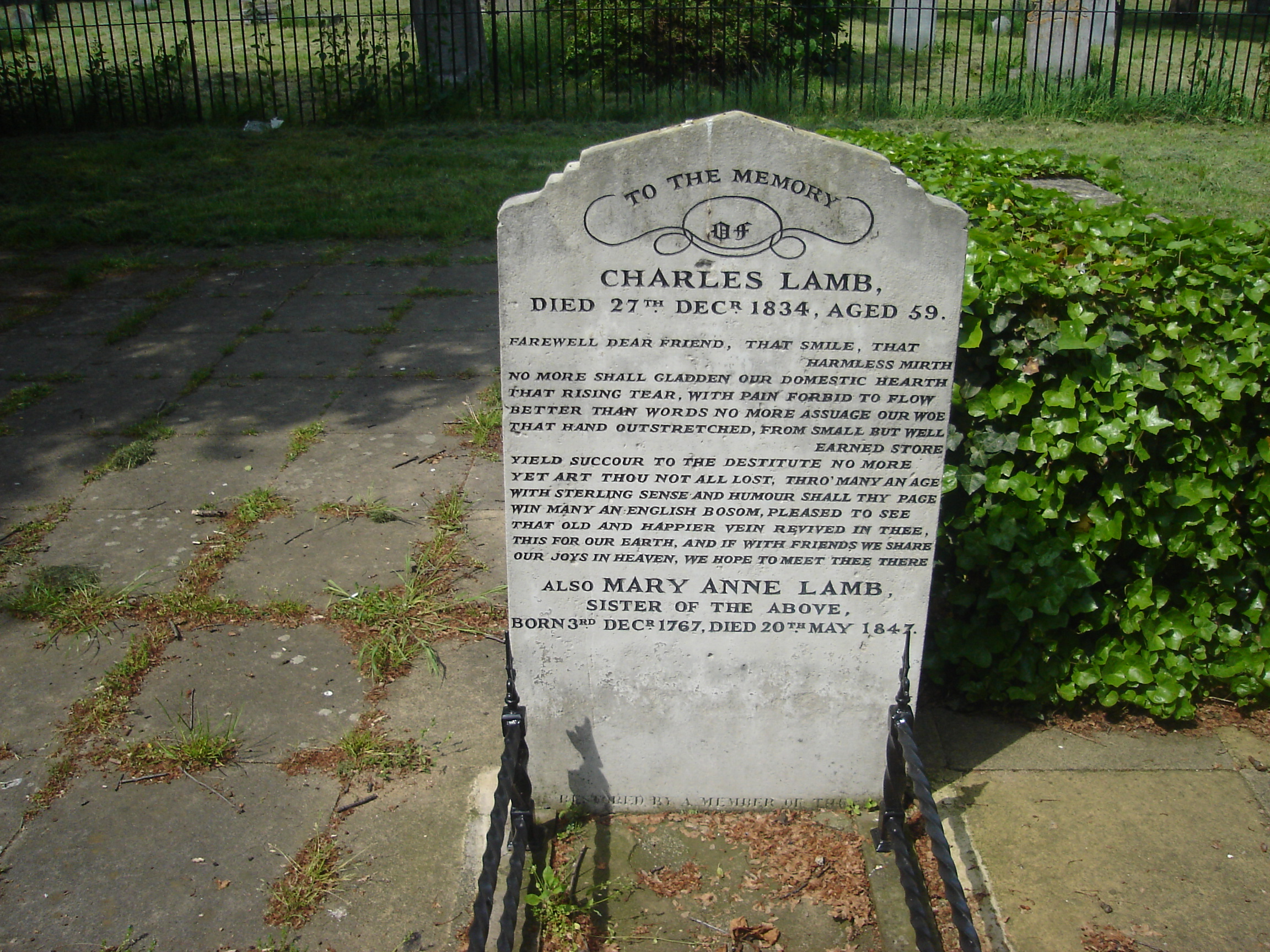
Charles and Mary Lamb's grave

In the first years of the 19th century, Lamb began a fruitful literary cooperation with his sister Mary. Together they wrote at least three books for William Godwin's Juvenile Library. The most successful of these was Tales From Shakespeare, which ran through two editions for Godwin and has been published dozens of times in countless editions ever since. The book contains artful prose summaries of some of Shakespeare's most well-loved works. According to Lamb, he worked primarily on Shakespeare's tragedies, while Mary focused mainly on the comedies.

Lamb's essay "On the Tragedies of Shakespeare Considered with Reference to their Fitness for Stage Representation"—originally published in the Reflector in 1811 with the title "On Garrick, and Acting; and the Plays of Shakspeare, considered with reference to their fitness for Stage Representation"—was prompted in response to his viewing of the David Garrick memorial on the west wall of Poet's Corner in Westminster Abbey, and has often been taken as the ultimate Romantic dismissal of the theatre. In the essay, Lamb argues that Shakespeare's plays should be read rather than performed to protect them from commercial performance and celebrity culture. The essay criticizes contemporary stage practice even as it develops a more complex reflection on the imaginative representation of Shakespearean dramas:

Shakespeare's dramas are for Lamb the object of a complex cognitive process that does not require sensible data, but only imaginative elements that are suggestively elicited by words. In the altered state of consciousness that the dreamlike experience of reading stands for, Lamb can see Shakespeare's own conceptions mentally materialized.

Besides contributing to Shakespeare's reception with his and his sister's book Tales From Shakespeare, Lamb also contributed to the recovery of acquaintance with Shakespeare's contemporaries. Accelerating the increasing interest of the time in the older writers, and building for himself a reputation as an antiquarian, in 1808 Lamb compiled a collection of extracts from the old dramatists, Specimens of the English Dramatic Poets Who Lived About the Time of Shakespeare. This also contained critical "characters" of the old writers, which added to the flow of significant literary criticism, primarily of Shakespeare and his contemporaries, from Lamb's pen. Immersion in seventeenth-century authors, such as Robert Burton and Sir Thomas Browne, also changed the way Lamb wrote, adding a distinct flavour to his writing style.

Lamb's friend the essayist William Hazlitt thus characterised him: "Mr. Lamb ... does not march boldly along with the crowd .... He prefers bye-ways to highways. When the full tide of human life pours along to some festive show, to some pageant of a day, Elia would stand on one side to look over an old book-stall, or stroll down some deserted pathway in search of a pensive description over a tottering doorway, or some quaint device in architecture, illustrative of embryo art and ancient manners. Mr. Lamb has the very soul of an antiquarian ...."

Although he did not write his first Elia essay until 1820, Lamb's gradual perfection of the essay form for which he eventually became famous began as early as 1811 in a series of open letters to Leigh Hunt's Reflector. The most famous of these early essays is "The Londoner", in which Lamb famously derides the contemporary fascination with nature and the countryside. In another well-known Reflector essay of 1811, he deemed William Hogarth's images to be books, filled with "the teeming, fruitful, suggestive meaning of words. Other pictures we look at; his pictures we read." He would continue to fine-tune his craft, experimenting with different essayistic voices and personae, for the better part of the next quarter century.

== Religious views ==
Christianity played an important role in Lamb's personal life: although he was not a churchman he "sought consolation in religion," as shown in letters he wrote to Samuel Taylor Coleridge and Bernard Barton in which he describes the New Testament as his "best guide" for life and recalls how he used to read the Psalms for one or two hours without getting tired. Other writings also deal with his Christian beliefs. Like his friend Coleridge, Lamb was sympathetic to Priestleyan Unitarianism and was a Dissenter, and he was described by Coleridge himself as one whose "faith in Jesus ha[d] been preserved" even after the family tragedy. Wordsworth also described him as a firm Christian in the poem "Written After the Death of Charles Lamb", Alfred Ainger, in his work Charles Lamb, writes that Lamb's religion had become "an habit".

Lamb's own poems "On The Lord's Prayer", "A Vision of Repentance", "The Young Catechist", "Composed at Midnight", "Suffer Little Children, and Forbid Them Not to Come Unto Me", "Written a Twelvemonth After the Events", "Charity", "Sonnet to a Friend" and "David" express his religious faith, while his poem "Living Without God in the World" has been called a "poetic attack" on unbelief, in which Lamb expresses his disgust at atheism, attributing it to pride.

== Legacy ==
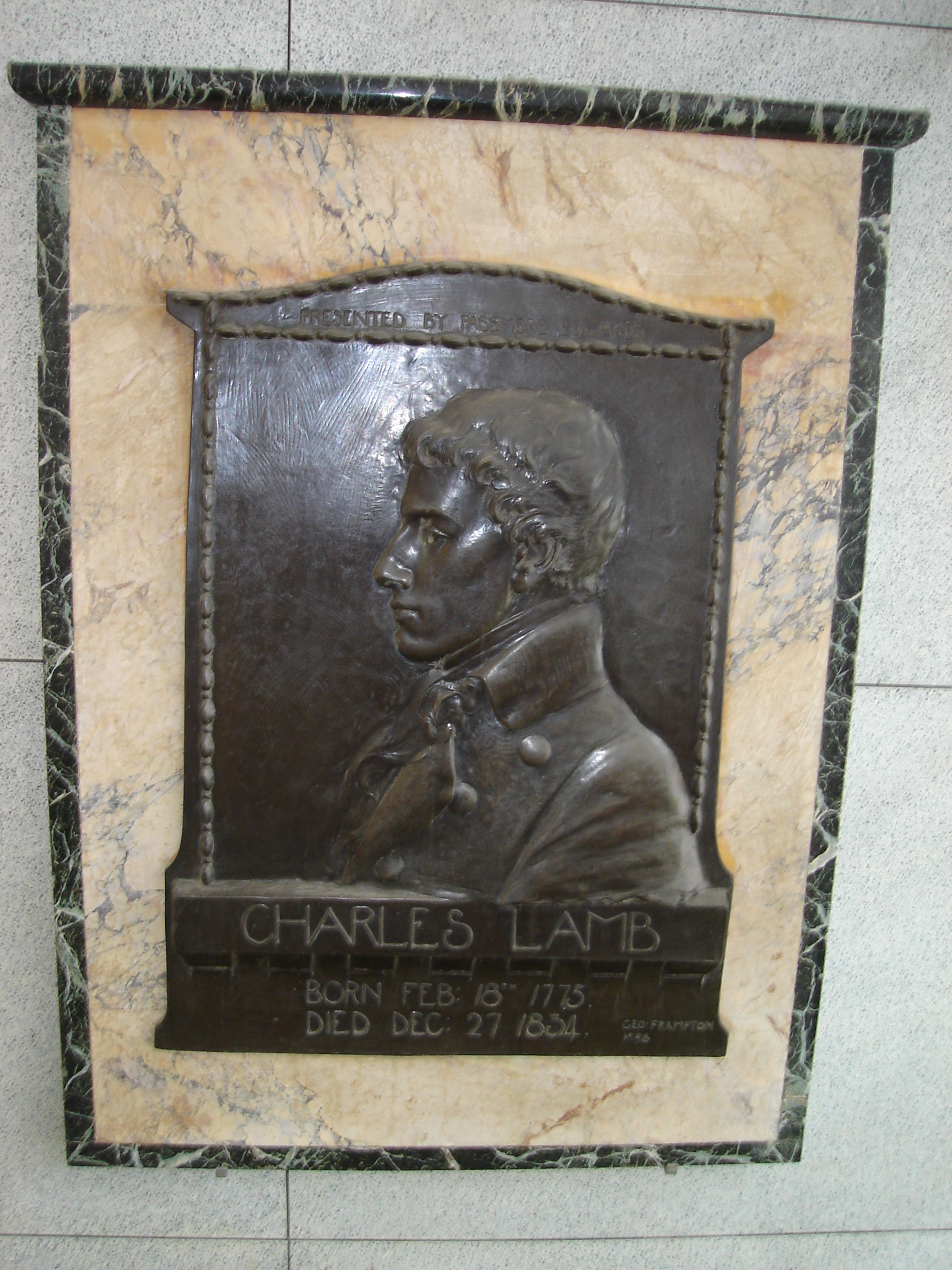
Portrait plaque of Lamb sculpted by George Frampton

There is a consistent following of Lamb's works, as Charles Lamb Bulletin demonstrates. His quirky style of writing has been more of a "cult favourite" than an author with scholarly appeal. Anne Fadiman notes that Lamb is not widely read in modern times: "I do not understand why so few other readers are clamoring for his company... [He] is kept alive largely through the tenuous resuscitations of university English departments.".

Two of the houses at Christ's Hospital (Lamb A and Lamb B) are named in his honour. and he is also honoured by The Latymer School, a grammar school in Edmonton, a suburb of London where he lived for a time: it has six houses, one of which, Lamb, is named after him. A major academic prize awarded each year at Christ's Hospital School's speech day is "The Lamb Prize for Independent Study".

Sir Edward Elgar wrote an orchestral work, Dream Children, inspired by Lamb's essay of that title.

A quotation from Lamb, "Lawyers, I suppose, were children once",' serves as the epigraph to Harper Lee's novel To Kill a Mockingbird.

Lamb is honoured in several Islington placenames. There is a commemorative plaque to Lamb at 64 Duncan Terrace, close to his former home 'Colebrooke Cottage'. At the north end of Colebrooke Row is Lamb's Mews, and at the south end, Elia Street. Charles Lamb Court is on Gerrard Road. The former Charles Lamb pub on Elia Street was named after him. The Charles Lamb Primary School on Popham Road (Formerly Popham Road School; now New North Academy School) was renamed after him in 1949.

Henry James Montague, founder of The Lambs Club, named it after the salon of Charles and his sister Mary.

Charles Lamb plays an important role in the plot of Mary Ann Shaffer and Annie Barrows's novel, The Guernsey Literary and Potato Peel Pie Society.

== Selected works ==
- Blank Verse, poems, 1798
- A Tale of Rosamund Gray, and Old Blind Margaret, 1798
- John Woodvil, verse drama, 1802
- Tales from Shakespeare, 1807
- The Adventures of Ulysses, 1808
- Specimens of English Dramatic Poets who Lived About the Time of Shakespeare, 1808
- On the Tragedies of Shakespeare, 1811
- Witches and Other Night Fears, 1821
- Essays of Elia, 1823
- The Last Essays of Elia, 1833
- Eliana, 1867
- Childrens Book

== Biographical references ==
- Life of Charles Lamb, by E.V. Lucas, G.P. Putman & Sons, London, 1905, revised editions 1907 and 1921.
- Charles Lamb and the Lloyds, edited by E.V. Lucas, Smith, Elder & Company, London, 1898.
- Charles Lamb and His Contemporaries, by Edmund Blunden, Cambridge University Press, 1933.
- Companion to Charles Lamb, by Claude Prance, Mansell Publishing, London, 1938.
- Charles Lamb; A Memoir, by Barry Cornwall aka Bryan Procter, Edward Moxon, London, 1866.
- Young Charles Lamb, by Winifred Courtney, New York University Press, 1982.
- A Portrait of Charles Lamb, by David Cecil, Constable, London, 1983.
- Charles Lamb, by George Barnett, Twayne Publishers, Boston, 1976.
- A Double Life: A Biography of Charles and Mary Lamb, by Sarah Burton, Viking, 1993.
- The Lambs: Their Lives, Their Friends, and Their Correspondence, by William Carew Hazlitt, C. Scribner's Sons, 1897.
- Dream-Child: A Life of Charles Lamb by Eric G. Wilson, Yale University Press, 2022.
- Charles Lamb:Man and Brother First, by David Carroll, The Book Guild, 2024
