= Sophie Blackall =

Australian artist, author, and children's book illustrator

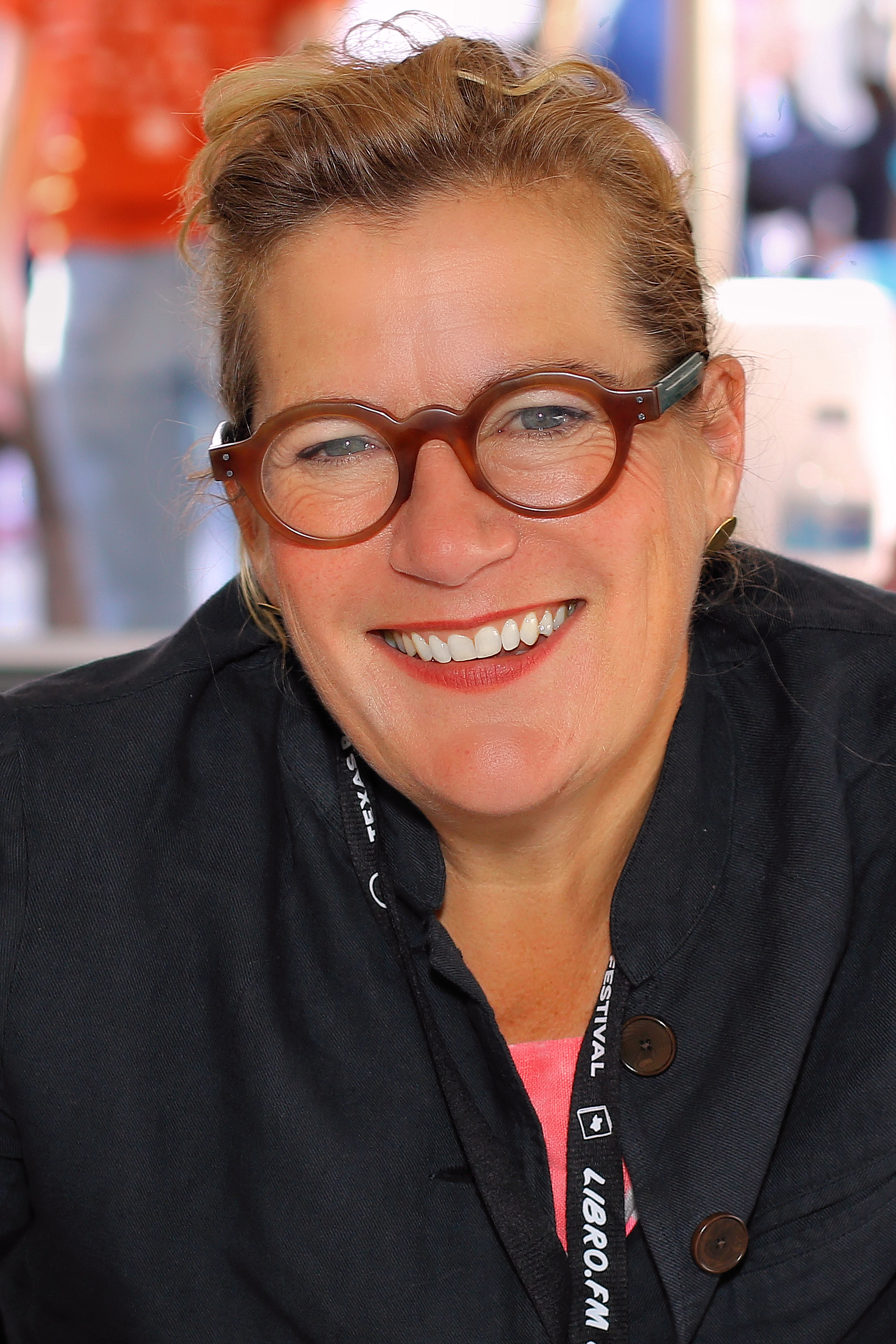
Blackall at the 2025 Texas Book Festival

Sophie Jocasta Blackall AM is an Australian artist, author, and illustrator of children's books based in Brooklyn, New York.

She is a two time Caldecott Medalist.

== Early life and education ==
Blackall was born in Melbourne, Victoria, Australia in 1970. In 1992, Blackall earned a Bachelor of Design from University of Technology Sydney.

Blackall started her career with various jobs, such as painting robotic characters for theme parks, and authoring a household hints column. She also exhibited her paintings at galleries in Sydney and Melbourne. While in Australia, she married and had two children.

In 2000, she won the lottery for an immigration visa and moved her family to Brooklyn, New York, even though she had no certainty of employment. She did various editorial work and did several animated commercials for the UK market.

== Literary career ==
She began illustrating children's books in collaboration with writers. Her first illustrated book, Ruby’s Wish by Shirin Yim Bridges, won the Ezra Jack Keats Book Award in 2003. Eventually, she began writing children's books on her own, as well as continuing her collaborative work.

Her first book for adults, Missed Connections: Love, Lost & Found (2011), was based on a blog for anonymous messages posted online by lovelorn strangers. She did a series of paintings for the book, based on some of these messages, and also made a poster for the MTA Arts for Transit program, which was displayed in New York City subway cars the following year.

Her 2015 collaboration with Emily Jenkins, A Fine Dessert: Four Centuries, Four Families, One Delicious Treat, was praised by reviewers but became the subject of controversy over its depiction of slavery.

As of 2016, she has illustrated more than 30 books for children, including the Ivy and Bean series. For this 10-volume series, she collaborated with author Annie Barrows via email. They did not meet in person until halfway through their work on the series.

Blackall has also collaborated with authors such as Jacqueline Woodson, John Bemelmans Marciano, Jane Yolen, and Meg Rosoff. Her work also includes animated television commercials and editorial illustrations for newspapers and magazines.

She hides an image of a whale in every book, in honor of the novel Moby Dick, by Herman Melville.

She seriously injured her hand in a fall while working at a children's camp. Rehabilitative physical therapy has only been partially successful; she may have to give up precision drawing, and change her creative methods. She is working on converting a farmhouse in upstate New York into a retreat for writers and artists, and is thinking of doing more writing herself.

Blackall was appointed a Member of the Order of Australia (AM) in the 2022 Queen's Birthday Honours.

== Awards and prizes ==
Blackall won the 2003 Ezra Jack Keats Book Award for Ruby’s Wish, the 2016 Caldecott Medal for Finding Winnie: The True Story of the World’s Most Famous Bear and the 2019 Caldecott Medal for Hello Lighthouse.

== List of works ==
=== Illustrator ===
- Ruby's Wish (by Shirin Yim Bridges, 2002) – winner of Ezra Jack Keats Award for Best New Illustrator in 2003
- Meet Wild Boars! (by Meg Rosoff, 2005)
- Summer is Summer (by Phillis and David Gershator, 2006)
- Ivy and Bean series (by Annie Barrows, 2006–2013)
- Red Butterfly: How a Princess Smuggled the Secret of Silk Out of China (by Deborah Noyes, 2007)
- What's So Bad About Being an Only Child? (by Cari Best, 2007)
- Jumpy Jack and Googily (by Meg Rosoff, 2008)
- Wild Boars Cook (by Meg Rosoff, 2008)
- Wombat Walkabout (by Carol Diggory Shields, 2009)
- Big Red Lollipop (by Rukhsana Khan, 2010)
- Pecan Pie Baby (by Jacqueline Woodson, 2010) – winner of Horn Book Honor in 2011
- The Crows of Pearblossom (by Aldous Huxley, 2011)
- Edwin Speaks Up (by April Stevens, 2011)
- Spinster Goose (by Lisa Wheeler, 2011)
- Mr. and Mrs. Bunny—Detectives Extraordinaire! (by Polly Horvath, 2012)
- Take Two! A Celebration of Twins (by J. Patrick Lewis and Jane Yolen, 2012)
- The Mighty Lalouche (by Matthew Olshan, 2013)
- The 9 Lives of Alexander Baddenfield (by John Bemelmans Marciano, 2013)
- And Two Boys Booed (by Judith Viorst, 2014)
- A Fine Dessert: Four Centuries, Four Families, One Delicious Treat (by Emily Jenkins, 2015)
- Finding Winnie: The True Story of the World's Most Famous Bear (by Lindsay Mattick, 2015)
- A Voyage in the Clouds: The (Mostly) True Story of the First International Flight by Balloon in 1785 (by Matthew Olshan, 2016)
- The Witches of Benevento series (by John Bemelmans Marciano)
  - Mischief Season (2016)
  - The All-Powerful Ring (2016)
  - Beware the Clopper! (2016)
  - Respect Your Ghosts (2017)
- Stella & Marigold: Mermaids and Mix-Ups: Book 2 (by Annie Barrows, 2025)

=== Author and illustrator ===
- 20 Party Tricks to Amuse and Amaze Your Friends (1997)
- Missed Connections: Love, Lost & Found (2011)
- Are You Awake? (2011)
- The Baby Tree (2014)
- Hello Lighthouse (2018) Winner of the 2019 Caldecott Medal
- If You Come to Earth (2020), named Best Children's Book of the Year for 2020 by the New York Times
- Things to Look Forward To (2022)
