= Hello Lighthouse =

Picture book by Sophie Blackall

- Author: Sophie Blackall
- Publisher: Little, Brown, and Company
- Publication date: April 10, 2018
- Pages: 48
- Awards: Caldecott Medal
- ISBN: 9780316362382
- OCLC: 978712587

Hello Lighthouse is a picture book written and illustrated by Sophie Blackall. The book tells the story of a lighthouse and its last keeper and was well received, winning the 2019 Caldecott Medal for its illustrations. Drawing inspiration from a variety of sources, Blackall worked hard on the design of the book. The writing and illustrations were meant to complement each other, noting the change and consistency of the sea.

== Background and publication ==
While at a flea market in 2013, Blackall came across a picture of a lighthouse on the northern tip of Newfoundland. Despite working on Finding Winnie at the time, this image stayed in Blackall's mind and would serve as the eventual inspiration for Hello Lighthouse. While writing the story it was important for Blackall to focus not only on the heroic deeds of the keepers, but also the ways their wives were "equally brave." Challenging inequalities in gender trait portrayals, Blackall depicts the male keeper as nurturing, traditionally a feminine trait. Blackall also drew inspiration from two of her favorite books, Ox-Cart Man and The Little House, which also depict the passage of time. She knew early in the process that she would alternate interior and exterior scenes. Blackall worked to meticulously design the book with her editor, an effort noted by reviewers. Writing the book in the aftermath of the 2016 US presidential election, a time that was among the "most turbulent times I’ve ever known" Blackall found it "was a great comfort to escape into my painting, to transport myself to a tiny island out at sea."

The book was published on April 10, 2018 by Little, Brown, and Company.

== Plot ==
The book opens with the lines, "On the highest rock of a tiny island at the edge of the world stands a lighthouse. It is built to last forever." To this lighthouse comes a new lighthouse keeper. The keeper settles in to the lighthouse, which is also his home, and keeps the log. Through the book as the keeper maintains the log, he lives his life, including getting married, saving survivors of a shipwreck, getting sick, and the birth of a child. As this is happening, the events of the ocean are also noted, accompanied by the repeated phrase "Hello! ...Hello! ....Hello!" At the end of the story, the lighthouse is automated and the keeper is not longer necessary. The keeper and his family move to a cottage on the mainland where they can continue to see the lighthouse, which continues to shine.

== Illustrations and themes ==
Blackall illustrated the book using Chinese ink and watercolor. The illustrations were bright and detailed and drew inspiration from traditional or old fashioned art to make a unique effecting style. This style paired well with the nostalgic text, whose sparseness evokes the log the keeper maintains, and the books long vertical format, evoking the lighthouse itself. The repetition and even pace of the text also helps to reinforce the routines of the characters. Reviewers noted the role constancy and change plays as the lighthouse stays the same, even being in the same space on different pages, even as the keeper experiences changes in his life and the sea itself goes through different phases. Reviewers have also noted that the historical accuracy of the illustrations sets it apart from other children's books. The sea remains present in the background throughout the book, even on pages which focus on special events in the life of the lighthouse's residents. Circles are also a repeated motif in the illustrations. Rather than a sad look back, the book is instead a celebration of those times. While the passage of time and the consistency of the lighthouse's presence are themes often discussed with the book, some have also commented about Blackall commenting on the evolution of technology through the ending of the book, as the lighthouse keeper is replaced by an automated process.

== Reception and awards ==
The book was well reviewed and received starred reviews from Booklist, the Bulletin of the Center for Children's Books, Kirkus Reviews, who named to the book to a "Best Book of the 21st Century" list, Publishers Weekly, who also named it a best book of 2018 calling it "a jewel of a creation", and School Library Journal where reviewer Elizabeth Blake wrote that, "readers feel as though they are inside the lighthouse along with the keeper, surrounded by the beauty and drama of the ever-changing sea." The New York Times, who named the book to its notables list of 2018, also praised the book, with writer Bruce Handy noting, "I will be surprised if a more exquisite picture book is published this year."

The book also won the 2019 Caldecott Medal. Caldecott Medal Committee Chair Mary Fellows said that, “Children will delight in immersing themselves in the captivating discoveries each new look at ‘Hello Lighthouse’ will bring.”

Awards
Preceded by Wolf in the Snow	Caldecott Medal; 2019	Succeeded by The Undefeated
