= Ivy + Bean =

Children's book series

- Author: Annie Barrows
- Illustrator: Sophie Blackall
- Language: English
- Genre: Children's fiction
- Publisher: Chronicle Books
- No. of books: 12

Ivy + Bean is a children's book series written by American author Annie Barrows, illustrated by Sophie Blackall, and published by Chronicle Books.

== Description ==
In the stories, Ivy, a quiet intellectual girl, and Bean, a rambunctious wild girl, become fast friends despite their differences and initial reluctance to like each other. The series tagline sums up the series as "two friends who never meant to like each other." They are both seven year old girls who live on the cul-de-sac of Pancake Court which is set in an unmentioned town. In each book, they get into considerable mischief and have wild adventures with the other characters in the neighborhood.

The books feature illustrations, but are not picture books. The reading level is suitable for grades three and above. As of 2021, there are twelve books in the series.

== Books ==
The series includes 12 books:

- Ivy + Bean (April 2006)
- Ivy + Bean and the Ghost That Had to Go (October 2006)
- Ivy + Bean Break the Fossil Record (August 2007)
- Ivy + Bean Take Care of the Babysitter (2007)
- Ivy + Bean: Bound to Be Bad (October 2008)
- Ivy + Bean: Doomed to Dance (September 2009)
- Ivy + Bean: What’s the Big Idea? (September 2010)
- Ivy + Bean: No News Is Good News (September 2011)
- Ivy + Bean Make the Rules (September 2011)
- Ivy + Bean Take the Case (September 2013)
- Ivy + Bean: One Big Happy Family (August 2018)
- Ivy + Bean: Get To Work! (April 2021)

== Adaptations ==
The books were planned to have an animated series that would have aired on the defunct network Universal Kids, but the series ended up in development hell and Universal Kids eventually ceased developing original content in 2019.

Netflix adapted the books into a live-action feature film. It starred Keslee Blalock as Ivy and Madison Skye Validum as Bean. Jesse Tyler Ferguson, Jane Lynch, Sasha Pieterse, Nia Vardalos, Jaycie Dotin, Garfield Wilson, and Marci T. House star in the film. It was released on September 2, 2022. Netflix continued the film series by adapting The Ghost That Had To Go and Doomed To Dance.
