= The Guernsey Literary and Potato Peel Pie Society =

2008 novel by Mary Ann Shaffer and Annie Barrows

- Author: Mary Ann Shaffer; Annie Barrows
- Cover artist: Christian Raoul Skrein von Bumbala
- Language: English
- Subject: German occupation of the English Channel Islands
- Genre: historical fiction
- Publisher: Dial Press
- Publication date: 2008
- Publication place: United States
- Pages: 274
- ISBN: 978-0-385-34099-1
- OCLC: 191089812

The Guernsey Literary and Potato Peel Pie Society is a historical novel by Mary Ann Shaffer and Annie Barrows that was published in 2008. It was adapted into a film in 2018 featuring Lily James as Juliet Ashton and Matthew Goode as Sidney Stark.

The book is set in 1946 and is an epistolary novel, composed of letters written from one character to another.

== Plot ==
In January 1946, 32-year-old Juliet Ashton embarks on a cross-country tour across England to promote her latest book. Written under her pen-name Izzy Bickerstaff, the book is a compilation of comedic columns she wrote about life during World War II. Despite the fact that she initially wrote under the name Izzy Bickerstaff during the war, Juliet writes to her publisher that she wants to retire the character and write under her real name.

On her tour, Juliet is greeted with flowers from the mysterious Markham V. Reynolds, Jr. Her best friend and publisher, Sidney, warns Juliet that Mark is a wealthy American trying to establish a publishing empire and looking to poach her. Reynolds makes it clear that he is a fan, and she and Reynolds soon begin dating.

Juliet receives a letter from Dawsey Adams, a complete stranger from Guernsey who has come into possession of her copy of Essays of Elia and who wants to know more about the author, Charles Lamb. Juliet helps to send him further books by Lamb. She is also intrigued that Adams is part of The Guernsey Literary and Potato Peel Pie Society and inquires about the group's name.

After learning that the society began as a cover for residents breaking curfew during the German occupation of Guernsey, Juliet begins a correspondence with several members of the Society, hoping to work them into an article she is writing on the benefits of literature for The Times Literary Supplement. Juliet also learns that Elizabeth McKenna, the Society's beloved founder, was arrested and sent to a prison in France by the Germans and has yet to return home. The members of the Society are raising her child, Kit, among themselves until Elizabeth returns.

As she continues to write to the members of the Society and they to her, Juliet begins to plan a trip to Guernsey to conduct research for a book about the group and their experiences of the war. Mark proposes as Juliet is preparing to leave for Guernsey and she delays giving an answer, not wanting to repeat the error of her previous engagement.

In Guernsey, Juliet is treated like an old friend and soon helps to watch Kit. She is also there when the members of the Society receive a letter from Remy Giraud, a French woman who was in the Ravensbrück concentration camp with Elizabeth. She informs them that Elizabeth is dead, but several members go to see her and encourage her to visit Guernsey with them, to which she eventually agrees.

Juliet decides to center her book on Elizabeth's experiences on Guernsey during the occupation, as told by her friends. While she is writing, Juliet is visited by Mark. Realizing that she has feelings for Dawsey and has since they first met, Juliet definitively rejects Mark's second proposal.

As she continues to write, Juliet also realizes that her time spent with Kit means that she now thinks of Kit as a daughter and wants to adopt her. She also longs to be with Dawsey but fears that he has fallen in love with Remy.

Remy eventually announces her plans to return to France and train as a baker in Paris. Isola Pribby, a member of the Society, believes that Dawsey is in love with Remy and, using Miss Marple as a model, offers to clean Dawsey's home to find proof he is in love with Remy to convince her to stay in Guernsey. Isola's plan is a failure, and she goes to Juliet to complain that she was unable to find anything that would signify his love for Remy, but instead found numerous pictures and tokens that belong to Juliet. Realizing that he is pining for her, Juliet runs to Dawsey and asks him to marry her.

Juliet ends by asking her publisher and friend Sidney to return to Guernsey in time for her wedding in a week's time.

== Creative background ==
The primary author Mary Ann Shaffer, an American, planned to write the biography of Kathleen Scott, the wife of the English polar explorer Robert Falcon Scott. While researching the subject, she travelled to Cambridge, England, but was discouraged to find that the subject's personal papers were nearly unusable. While dealing with this frustration, she decided to spend some of her planned stay in England by visiting Guernsey in the Channel Islands, which are notable for being geographically closer to continental France than to the United Kingdom. However, as soon as she arrived, the airport was shut down due to heavy fog. Shaffer, therefore, spent her visit in the airport's bookshop, reading several histories of the German occupation of the islands during World War II.

It was 20 years before Shaffer began a novel dealing with Guernsey. She had abandoned her plan to write the Scott biography, and said: "All I wanted was to write a book that someone would like enough to publish."

After the manuscript had been accepted for publication (2006), the book's editor requested some changes that would require substantial rewriting. However, around that time Shaffer's health began to deteriorate dramatically, leading to her eventual death on February 16, 2008. She asked the daughter of her sister Cynthia, Annie Barrows, an established author of children's literature, to finish the editing and rewriting. Barrows did so and is credited as co-author of the novel.

== Notable characters ==
Characters of importance include:

- Juliet Ashton, author and protagonist
- Dawsey Adams, Juliet's first Guernsey correspondent and close friend
- Sidney Stark, Juliet's London-based publisher and friend
- Sophie Strachan, Sidney's sister and Juliet's best friend
- Amelia Maugery, Guernsey resident and hostess of the dinner party that started the Society
- Isola Pribby, Guernsey resident, quirky Society member, and vegetable and herb vendor
- Eben Ramsey, Guernsey resident and former postman
- Eli, Guernsey resident and Eben's grandson
- Will Thisbee, Guernsey resident and creator of the first potato peel pie
- Kit McKenna, Elizabeth's adorable, ferret-loving daughter
- Elizabeth McKenna, London-born young lady who was caught on Guernsey at the war's outset, and the quick-witted founder of the Society
- Remy Giraud, a Frenchwoman and friend of Elizabeth's in a German concentration camp

== Reception ==
The Guernsey Literary and Potato Peel Pie Society was reviewed by The Washington Post and The Times, among other outlets. It reached the number one position on The New York Times Best Seller list for paperback trade fiction on August 2, 2009; it had been on the list for 11 weeks.

Stevie Davies, writing for The Guardian, said, "Shaffer's Guernsey characters step from the past radiant with eccentricity and kindly humour, a comic version of the state of grace. They are innocents who have seen and suffered, without allowing evil to penetrate the rind of decency that guards their humanity. Their world resembles Shakespeare's Ephesian or Illyrian comedies; but its territory incorporates both Elysium and Hades."

Publishers Weekly said of the book, "The occasionally contrived letters jump from incident to incident—including the formation of the Guernsey Literary and Potato Peel Pie Society while Guernsey was under German occupation—and person to person in a manner that feels disjointed. But Juliet's quips are so clever, the Guernsey inhabitants so enchanting and the small acts of heroism so vivid and moving that one forgives the authors (Shaffer died earlier this year) for not being able to settle on a single person or plot."

Kirkus Reviews said of the book, "Elizabeth and Juliet are appealingly reminiscent of game but gutsy '40s movie heroines. The engrossing subject matter and lively writing make this a sure winner, perhaps fodder for a TV series."

== Adaptations ==
A film adaptation, directed by Mike Newell and starring Lily James as Juliet Ashton, was released in 2018. It premiered and was theatrically released in the United Kingdom in April 2018 and in France in June 2018. The film grossed $15.7 million worldwide and received generally positive reviews from critics. It was distributed in other international areas by Netflix on 10 August 2018 as an original film.
