= Nicolo Pasetti =

American actor

Nicolo Pasetti (born 1999 as Nicolò Bernardino Pasetti Bombardella) is an American-Italian actor. He is best known for his roles as Christian Hellmann in the film The Guernsey Literary and Potato Peel Pie Society (2018) and as Deputy Sheriff Martin in the Spaghetti Western television series That Dirty Black Bag (2022).

== Early life and career ==
In an interview he explained that even though his parents wanted him to consider different careers, he insisted on pursuing acting.

In 2018 Pasetti appeared in the historical drama The Guernsey Literary and Potato Peel Pie Society, directed by Mike Newell, as a German soldier.

In 2019 Pasetti was cast as the male lead Josh in The Bitter Taste, an independent mystery thriller directed by Guido Tölke et in the 1980s in an unknown, small-town, that harbors a dark secret that can be traced back to an old legend from the Thirty Year War. He also played one of the leads and the police's prime suspect in an episode of the German TV crime series WaPo Bodensee and was cast in the Netflix series The Queen's Gambit, directed by Scott Frank.

Pasetti appeared in Lucio Pellegrini's biopic about Renato Carosone. In 2021 Pasetti was cast in the Dracula horror movie Last Voyage of the Demeter, in a new Spaghetti-western, That Dirty Black Bag, in which he played a shifty deputy sheriff, in Industry, a British-American television drama series produced by HBO, playing the CEO of a fashion label from Milan, and as John F. Kennedy's best friend Lem Billings in the Arte TV-production Kennedy's Love for Europe.

== Filmography ==
=== Film ===
Year	Title	Role	Notes
2015	Solness	Till	
2016	Rico, Oskar and the Mysterious Stone	Adam	
2017	Surfaces	Stephen Newman	Short Movie
2017	Mangia, amore mio!	Benito	Short Movie
2018	Eye for an Eye	Mo	
2018	The Guernsey Literary and Potato Peel Pie Society	Christian Hellmann	
2018	Mutti	Jack	Short Movie
2019	Misfit	Jake Williams	
2019	Ruides	Mathus	Trailer
2019	Aren't You Happy	The Brother	
2022	The Bunker Game	Kurt	
2022	Filip	Karl	
2023	The Last Voyage of the Demeter	Deputy Hirsch	
2023	The Bitter Taste	Josh	
2023	Body Odyssey	Mr. Lars	
2024	The Tasters	Gunther Halder	

=== Television ===
Year	Title	Role	Notes
2015	In Gefahr	Various	Multiple Episodes
2015	Geschichten Mitteldeutschlands	Corporal	Season 3
2016-2017	Schicksale - und plötzlich ist alles anders	Various	Multiple Episodes
2017	Dreams of a New World	Fiorello LaGuardia	Main character
2019	Rivalen und Rebellen	Philipp Burger	Main character
2020	The Queen's Gambit	Reporter B. Cooper	Miniseries
2020	WaPo Bodensee	Marcel Brunner	Episode "Echte Freunde"
2021	tatort	Max Möller	Episode "Hetzjagd"
2021	Carosello Carosone	Peter Van Wood	
2022	Kennedy's Love For Europe	Lem Billings	
2022	That Dirty Black Bag	Martin	Season 1
2022	Industry	Rocco Carbone	Season 2
2022	The Law According to Lidia Poet	Louis	Season 1
2023	El Dorado: Everything the Nazis hate	Gottfried von Cramm	
2023	Cuori	Helmut Becker	Season 2
2025	Lynley	Paolo Ross	Episode "This Body of Death"
