= Wolf in the Snow =

2017 wordless picture book

- Author: Matthew Cordell
- Publisher: Feiwel & Friends, an imprint of Macmillian
- Publication date: January 3, 2017
- Pages: 48
- Awards: Caldecott Medal
- ISBN: 978-1250076366
- OCLC: 1001724046

Wolf in the Snow is a 2017 wordless picture book by Matthew Cordell. The book was favorably received by critics and won the 2018 Caldecott Medal. The story has drawn comparisons to fairy tales like Little Red Riding Hood. The nearly wordless book tells the story of a girl and wolf who each get lost in the snowstorm. Cordell used distinctive illustration techniques for the girl and the wolf.

== Plot ==
In this nearly wordless picture book a girl and a wolf each get lost in a snowstorm. The two meet as the storm ends and the girl picks up the wolf and follows the sounds of wolves she hears, encountering some dangers along the way. After returning the wolf to its mother the girl gets lost and falls. The wolves howl to let one of the girl's searching parents know where to find her. The words that are present reflect the sounds and actions of the story.

== Themes and illustrations ==
Several critics noted the parallels between Wolf in the Snow and fairy tales like Little Red Riding Hood. This allusion was something Cordell thought about. The concept for the book started with his drawing a girl in a red coat in a white field looking at a wolf, "I liked the graphic color combination of the black, the red, and the white. I liked the suspense created by the child and the wolf and the unanswered question of what was happening or not happening or what was going to happen between the two." Critics also noted the value of loyalty and kindness being returned by the wolves.

Cordell used blended watercolors in a "freeform" way for the illustrations. There is a marked contrast in the drawings between the way the girl, who is drawn "almost cartoonish[ly]" and the scary realism of the wolves. The importance and role of the book's typography drew comparisons to comic books.

== Reception and awards ==
Wolf in the Snow received positive reviews and was noted on best of year lists. Writing for School Library Journal Peter Blenski called the book, "A heartwarming adventure about helping others, best shared one-on-one to pore over the engaging images" and awarded the book a star. Maggie Reagan in a starred review for Booklist also noted a similar them saying the book "is a tender, never precious story of kindness and cooperation." In another starred review Kirkus Reviews, described the book as a one that is "deeply satisfying" and "keep[s] readers hooked to the end." It also received starred reviews from Horn Book Guide, Horn Book Magazine, and Publishers Weekly. It was also listed as a best book of 2017 by National Public Radio who noted that "Cordell offers young readers a dreamy fable with a lot to say about making connections outside your comfort zone" Horn Book Magazine, School Library Journal, Kirkus, the Boston Globe, and Huffington Post where it was called "a new parable for our times.

The American Library Association awarded the book its 2018 Caldecott Medal citing its "fairy tale elements and a strong sense of color and geometry offer an engrossing, emotionally charged story." Award Committee Chair Tish Wilson said, “Committee members were astonished that a deceptively simple book could be such a dramatic story of survival.” In his Caldecott acceptance speech, Cordell revealed that an early illustration that turned into the story came from his disappointment that an earlier book of his, Hello! Hello!, had not been recognized for the Caldecott.

Awards
Preceded by Radiant Child: The Story of Young Artist Jean-Michel Basquiat	Caldecott Medal; 2018	Succeeded by Hello Lighthouse
