= Isaac Bickerstaff =

Pseudonym used by Jonathan Swift

Isaac Bickerstaff Esq was a pseudonym used by Jonathan Swift as part of a hoax to predict the death of then-famous Almanac-maker and astrologer John Partridge.

"All Fools' Day" (1 April, now known as April Fools' Day) was Swift's favourite holiday, and he often used this day to aim his satirical wit at non-believers in an attempt to "make sin and folly bleed". Disgruntled by Partridge's sarcastic attack about the "infallible Church" written in his 1708 issue of Merlinus Almanac, Swift projected three letters and a eulogy as an elaborate plan to "predict" Partridge's "infallible death" on 29 March, the anniversary of the famous 1652 "Black Monday" eclipse, widely seen as discrediting to astrology.

The first of the three letters, Predictions for the Year 1708, published in January 1708, predicts, among other things, the death of Partridge by a "raging fever". In the second letter, The Accomplishment of the First of Mr. Bickerstaff's Predictions, published in March 1708, Swift writes not as Bickerstaff but as a "man employed in the Revenue", and "confirms" the imaginary Bickerstaff's prediction. To accompany The Accomplishments, Swift also published an elegy for Partridge in which, typical of Swift's satire, he blames not only Partridge, but those who purchase the Almanacs as well:

Here, five Foot deep, lies on his Back,
A Cobler, Starmonger, and Quack;
Who to the Stars in pure Good-will,
Does to his best look upward still.
Weep all you Customers that use
His Pills, his Almanacks, or Shoes;
And you that did your Fortunes seek,
Step to his Grave but once a Week:
This Earth which bears his Body's Print,
You'll find has so much Vertue in't,
That I durst pawn my Ears 'twill tell
Whate'er concerns you full as well,
In Physick, Stolen Goods, or Love,
As he himself could, when above.

The hoax gained immense popularity, and plagued Partridge to the true end of his life. Mourners, thinking him dead, often kept him awake at night by crying outside his window. Accounts of an undertaker arriving at his house to arrange drapes for the mourning, an elegy being printed and even a gravestone being carved, culminate in Partridge publishing a letter aspriring to have the last word and proclaiming (and reclaiming) himself as living. In 1709 Swift, writing as Bickerstaff for the last time, published A Vindication of Isaac Bickerstaff, in which he abandoned any real attempt to maintain the hoax but disputed Partridge's public letter, saying, "There were sure no man alive ever to writ such damned stuff as this." He went on sarcastically to reason that "Death is defined by all Philosophers [as a] Separation of the Soul and Body. Now it is certain, that the poor Woman, who has best Reason to know [Partridge's wife], has gone about for some time to every Alley in the Neighbourhood, and swore to the Gossips, that Her Husband had neither Life nor Soul in Him."

== Later influence ==
Later in 1709, Richard Steele bolstered the release of his new paper The Tatler by naming the fictitious Isaac Bickerstaff Esq. as editor. The Tatler had occasional contributions from Swift, although largely written by Steele and Joseph Addison.

Benjamin Franklin based the persona of "Poor Richard", the author of Poor Richard's Almanack, on Swift's Bickerstaff character.

In Jules Verne's 1895 novel Propeller Island, the governor of the titular island is named Cyrus Bikerstaff, in tribute to Swift's character.

H. P. Lovecraft used the pseudonym "Isaac Bickerstaffe [sic], Jr." in 1914 for a series of letters to the editor of The Providence Evening News, refuting the predictions of an astrologer the paper published.

The Canadian caricaturist Don Evans (born Toronto, 1936) published in 1975–85 three volumes of cartoons under the pseudonym Isaac Bickerstaff. He lives in Orillia, Ontario, where he is active in local politics. Personal archives including 300 drawings are at the University of Calgary.

In the novel The Guernsey Literary and Potato Peel Pie Society (2008) and its eponymous 2018 film adaptation, the lead character, author Juliet Ashton, writes under the pen name Izzy Bickerstaff.

Adam J. Smith and Jo Waugh of The Conversation and Patricia Casey, writing for the Irish Independent, have suggested that fictional Twitter user Titania McGrath, created by comedian and Spiked columnist Andrew Doyle, was influenced by Bickerstaff.
