= Matthew Cordell =

American writer and illustrator

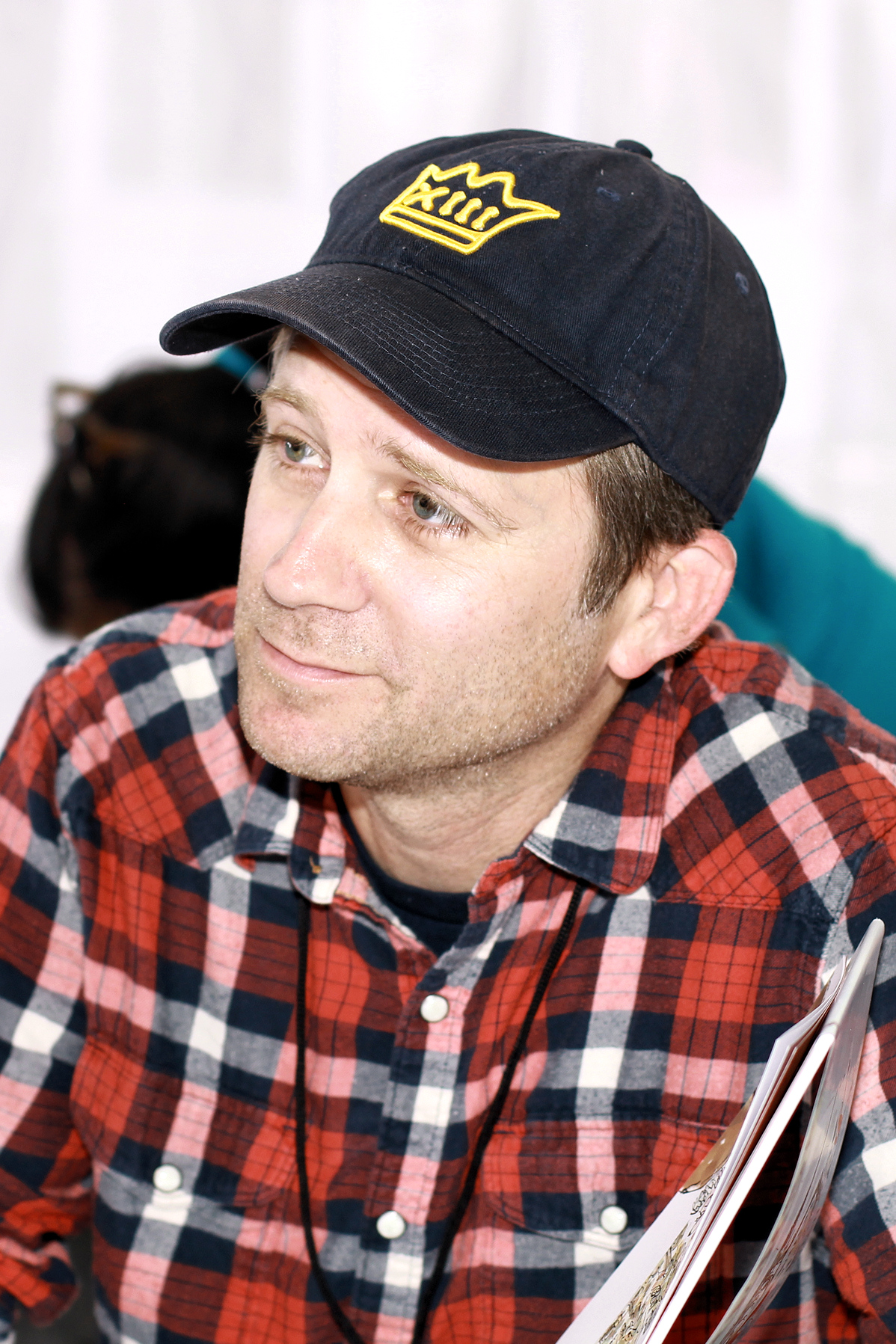
Cordell at the 2019 Texas Book Festival

Matthew Cordell (born September 11, 1975) is an American author and illustrator of children's books. His book Wolf in the Snow won the 2018 Caldecott Medal.

== Author-Illustrator Bibliography ==
- Trouble Gum (Feiwel & Friends, 2009)
- Another Brother (Feiwel & Friends, 2012)
- hello! hello! (Little, Brown Books for Young Readers, 2012)
- Wish (Disney-Hyperion, 2015)
- Wolf in the Snow (Feiwel & Friends, 2017)
- Dream (Little, Brown Books for Young Readers, 2017)
- King Alice (Feiwel & Friends, 2018)
- Hope (Disney-Hyperion, 2019)
- Explorers (Feiwel & Friends, 2019)
- Hello, Neighbor!: The Kind and Caring World of Mister Rogers (Neal Porter Books, 2020)
- Bear Island (Feiwel & Friends, 2021)
- Cornbread & Poppy (Little, Brown Books for Young Readers, 2022)
- Cornbread & Poppy at the Carnival (Little, Brown Books for Young Readers, 2022)
- Evergreen (Feiwel & Friends, 2023)
- Cornbread & Poppy at the Museum (Little, Brown Books for Young Readers, 2023)
- Cornbread & Poppy for the Win (April 2024) (Little, Brown Books for Young Readers, 2024)
