= Mary Ann Shaffer =

American writer, editor, librarian, and a bookshop worker (1934-2008)

- Born: Mary Ann Fiery; December 13, 1934; Martinsburg, West Virginia, U.S.
- Died: February 16, 2008 (aged 73); San Anselmo, California, U.S.
- Education: Miami University
- Occupations: Writer; editor; librarian; bookshop worker
- Spouse: Carl Richard Shaffer (m. 1956)
- Children: 2
- Relatives: Annie Barrows (niece)
- Writing career
- Notable work: The Guernsey Literary and Potato Peel Pie Society (2008)

Mary Ann Shaffer (née Fiery; December 13, 1934 – February 16, 2008) was an American writer, editor, librarian, and a bookshop worker. She is noted for her posthumously published work The Guernsey Literary and Potato Peel Pie Society, which she wrote with her niece, Annie Barrows.

== Biography ==
Mary Ann Fiery was born on December 13, 1934, in Martinsburg, West Virginia. She had an older sister, Cynthia. They were raised in nearby Romney, West Virginia, but moved back to Martinsburg and went to high school there. Mary Ann was an alumna of Miami University in Oxford, Ohio. She married Carl Richard Shaffer in 1956, and in 1958 they moved to California, where they raised two daughters, Morgan and Liz. She worked in the public libraries of San Anselmo, Larkspur, and San Rafael during her career. She also worked as an editor at Harper & Row, and as a bookseller at bookstores in Larkspur and Corte Madera. She began writing The Guernsey Literary and Potato Peel Pie Society in the early 2000s, at the urging of her writing group. She died at her home in San Anselmo, California on February 16, 2008, shortly before the book was published.
