= Annie Barrows =

American editor and author

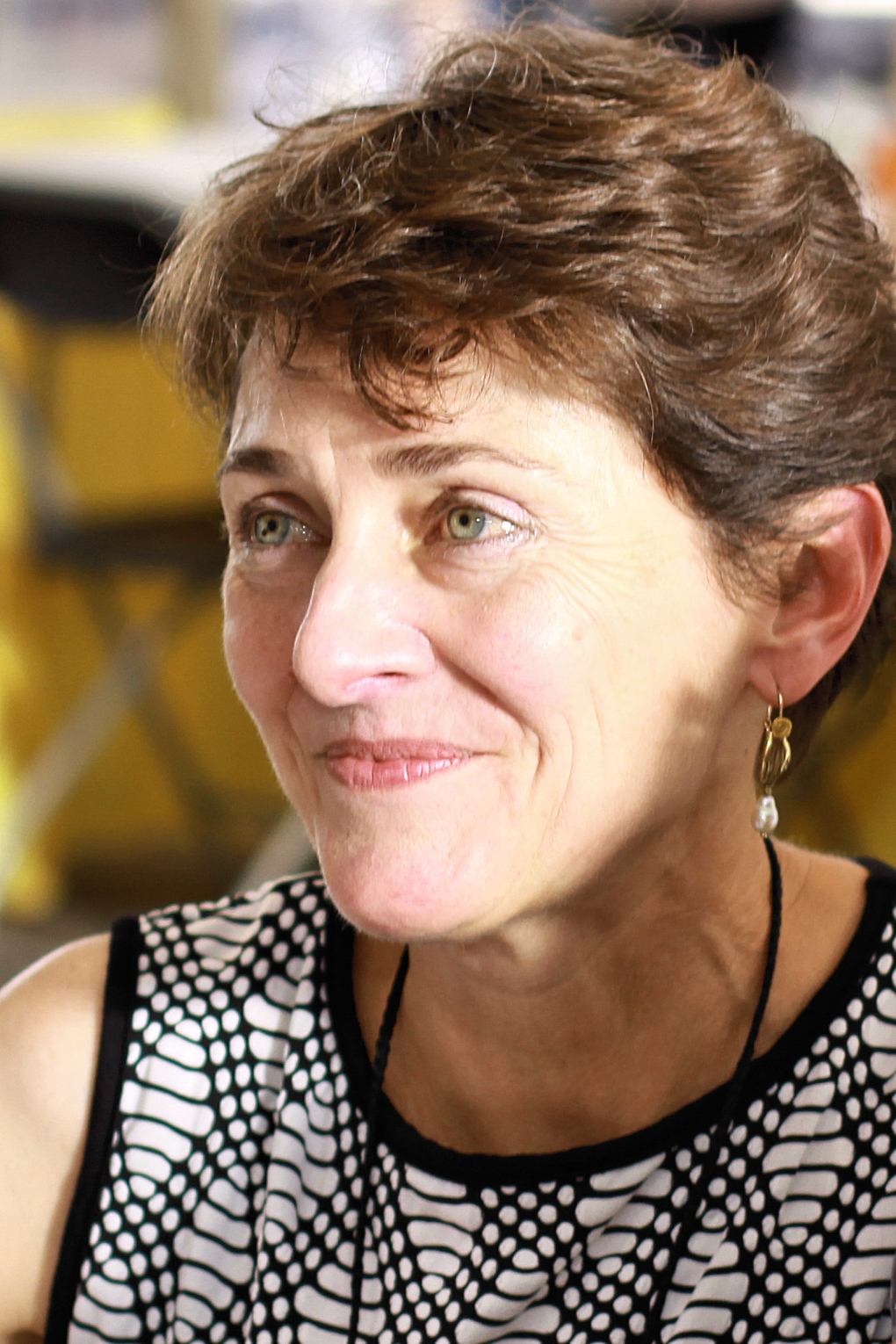
- Barrows at the 2018 Texas Book Festival
- Born: 1962 (age 63–64); San Diego, California, U.S.
- Website: http://www.anniebarrows.com/

Annie Barrows (born 1962 in San Diego, California) is an American editor and author. She is best known for the Ivy and Bean series of children's books, but she has written several other books for adult readers as well. With her aunt Mary Ann Shaffer she co-wrote The Guernsey Literary And Potato Peel Pie Society, which was later adapted into a film.

== Personal life ==
Barrows is the second of two girls (her sister is two years older). She was born in San Diego, near the southern border of the state of California. When she was three weeks old the family moved to a small town, San Anselmo, in Northern California. She spent considerable time during her childhood in the town's children's library, where she eventually got a part-time job while in junior high school, maintaining the books and reshelving them.

Barrows attended UC Berkeley, originally majoring in English Literature, but graduating in Medieval History. She worked as an editor, then decided to turn to writing. After enrolling in a writing school, she then began writing books for adults.

Barrows is married. She has two daughters. Her aunt was Mary Ann Shaffer.

== Writing career ==
Barrows' first writing output was for adult non-fiction. In 2003 she turned to Children's literature, for which she is most noted and honored. Of her interest in this area she has written:

I sometimes think I've spent my entire life trying to recreate one particular afternoon of my tenth year. That was the day I lay on the couch reading a wonderful book called Time at the Top until I lost all sense of my real life and joined the life of the book instead. It was glorious, like walking into a dream. I want every kid to have that experience, but most of all, being horribly selfish, I want to have it again, too. And finally, I've discovered a way: I write books.

== Published works ==
- The Magic Half (2009)
- The Ivy & Bean series (2003-2018; 12 books published as of April 2021)
- The Guernsey Literary and Potato Peel Pie Society (2008; Barrows is listed as co-author, after she finished the book for her aunt, Mary Ann Shaffer, who fell ill and died before the book was ready for publication)
- Magic in the Mix (2014) (sequel to The Magic Half)
- The Truth According to Us (2015)
- Nothing (2017)
- What John Marco Saw (2019)
- The Iggy series (2020-2022; 4 book published as of June 2022. A 5th book is expected on June 13, 2023)
- Like (2022)

== Awards and recognitions ==
- Kentucky Bluegrass Award nominee (2011)
- Mark Twain Readers Award nominee (2010–11) for The Magic Half
- Virginia Readers' Choice nominee (2010–11) for The Magic Half
- Rhode Island Children's Book Award nominee (2010) for The Magic Half
- Massachusetts Children's Book Award nominee (2010) for The Magic Half
- Sasquatch Reading Award nominee (2011) for The Magic Half
- Maud Hart Lovelace Award nominee (2011–12)
- Sunshine State Young Readers Award nominee (2011–12)
