= Imre Czomba =

Hungarian-American composer and musician

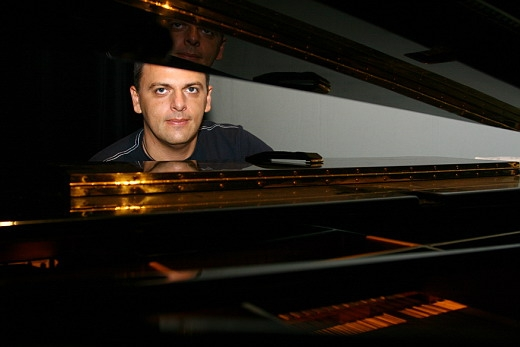

Background information
- Born: Imre Czomba; September 9, 1972 (age 53); Hungary, Miskolc; living in Los Angeles, United States
- Genres: Film score, Theatre music, Classical music, Jazz, pop
- Occupations: Composer, Film composer, Theatre composer, Video game composer, Music producer
- Instruments: Piano, Organ, Accordion, Synthesizer, Flute, Guitar
- Years active: 1993–present

Imre Czomba (born September 9, 1972) is a Los Angeles-based Hungarian-American composer, film composer, orchestrator, conductor, arranger, music producer, and musician. He is a voting member of the Recording Academy (Grammy) and the Television Academy (Emmy).

Active in the international music scene since 1993, he has worked across film, Tv, theatrical productions, international events, and dance theatre. He collaborated with ExperiDance, a Hungarian dance troupe, over an 18-year period, with productions performed in theaters across Europe and Asia. His credits include compositions for the 2008 Summer and 2014 Winter Olympic Games, the 2013 European Judo Championship, and the 2006 European Aquatic Championship. In 2008 and 2009, he composed music for the Hungarian National Day fireworks shows in Budapest, which drew audiences of over 3 million viewers. In 2024, he joined the ISINA Academy as a mentor, alongside Walter Afanasieff, Michael Bolton, Greg Phillinganes, Richard Marx, Robin Thicke, Humberto Gatica, Chris Lord-Alge, Paul Oakenfold, and Taika Waititi.

== Early life ==
At an early point in his career, Imre was inspired by the blues, which can be clearly heard in his piano playing. He has been a member of several top blues bands and has performed on the same stages with B. B. King, Sting, Zucchero, Pink and Robben Ford. Czomba has credits on numerous albums as composer, arranger, orchestrator, music producer, and musician, including several Gold and Platinum certified releases. In the pop music world, his most notable success was with Zsuzsa Cserhati, Akos, and the band Nox, who went on to win a number of local awards, including the Golden Giraffe.

== Quarantine Music Chain ==
Czomba has collaborated with artists from sixteen countries, including Kenny G, Michael Boddicker, Alphonso Johnson (Weather Report, Santana), Ed Calle (Gloria Estefan, Michael Bolton), Richie Garcia (Phil Collins Band), and Michael O'Neill (Barbra Streisand Band).The project originated as a small-scale remote collaboration among a few colleagues but quickly expanded into a larger production involving more than 100 contributors. The resulting work was developed collectively, reflecting the contributions of multiple composers and performers.

== The Sound of Music - Eine musikalische Liebeserklärung ==
In 2023, Czomba served as co-arranger, conductor, and orchestrator on the Austrian documentary The Sound of Music: Eine musikalische Liebeserklärung, a production centered on Salzburg and the legacy of the 1965 film The Sound of Music. The documentary featured Yvonne Catterfeld, Kenneth "Babyface" Edmonds, Thalia, and Pentatonix, with music produced by Walter Afanasieff.

== Why the Sun and the Moon live in the sky ft. Chloe x Halle (Vogue Magazine US) ==
In 2021, he composed the score for the Vogue short film Why the Sun and the Moon Live in the Sky, directed by Julie Dash and starring Halle Bailey and Chloe Bailey of Chloe x Halle.

== Theatre ==
In 2000, Imre's career took a different turn when he was asked to compose music for several plays such as Merlin Theatre's Deathtrap. That experience led to a meeting with choreographer Sandor Roman, with whom Imre developed work for ExperiDance. The dance group is committed to the heritage of Hungarian folk dance. Imre composed a music repertoire built around Hungarian folk music, but also steps outside its boundaries. These stage shows are regularly played on the stages of Budapest's theaters and in bigger cities countrywide as guest performances. He has many musical plays, such as Birth of a Country(2007). The shows were performed with 250 dancers and 10 singers at Budapest's Hero Square. Untouchables (2012) played at the Margaret Island Open-Air Stage, and The Taming of the Shrew (Makrancos Kata) (2013) played at the RaM Colosseum.

== Sporting Events Official Songs ==
In 2006, Imre also had the opportunity to compose the official song for the 2006 European Aquatics Championships. Sports lovers all over the continent enjoyed the song, and it went platinum on the day of its CD release. This led to Imre composing the Hungarian Olympic Team's official song in 2008, the Judo European Championship's official song in 2013, and Evgeni Plushenko's Russian National Championship and Winter Olympic Music. Imre's song is the official song of the Judo World Championship in 2021.

== Theatre premieres ==
Year	Title	Venue	Location	Credit(s)
2016	Penetration	Fringe Hollywood	Los Angeles	Composer
2016	Benyovszky	—	Budapest	Orchestrator
2016	Nostradamus	RaM Colosseum	Budapest	Composer
2015	I, Leonardo	—	Milan	Composer
2014	A Night in Venice	RaM Colosseum	Budapest	Composer
2014	Játékkészítő (The Game Creator)	Tüskecsarnok	Budapest	Score composer
2013	The Taming of the Shrew (Makrancos Kata)	RaM Colosseum	Budapest	Composer
2013	Radnóti	RaM Colosseum	Budapest	Composer
2012	Untouchable	Margaret Island Open-Air Stage	Budapest	Composer
2011	Liliomfi	Palace of the Arts	Budapest	Composer
2011	The Person of the King	RaM Colosseum	Budapest	Composer
2009	Happiness 69:09	Palace of the Arts	Budapest	Composer
2008	Measure for Measure	National Dance Theatre	Budapest	Composer
2007	Essence	—	Beijing	Composer
2007	The Birth of a Country	Heroes' Square	Budapest	Composer
2006	Festen	Pesti Theatre	Budapest	Composer
2006	Gypsies of Nagyida	National Dance Theatre	Budapest	Composer
2005	Steel, the Legend of the Metal	Bolzan Urban Theatre	—	Composer
2002	Revans	National Theatre	Budapest	Composer
2001	One Thousand and One Year	Szolnoki Szigligeti Theatre	Szolnok	Composer
2001	Deathtrap	Merlin Theatre	Budapest	Composer
2000	E.Tango	Thália Theatre	Budapest	Composer

== Fireworks Music Budapest ==
He was highly honored with an invitation to write music for the Hungarian National Day's fireworks in 2008 and 2009. With over 3 million viewers, it was an unforgettable moment in his professional life.

== Television, Film ==
He next turned to television as a composer and music producer. In 2013, Czomba relocated to Los Angeles, where he has since worked on international film and television productions.

== Film and television ==
Year	Title	Type	Episodes	Credit(s)
2026	Heroic	Film	—	Composer, music producer, songwriter ("I'm on My Way Up")
2025–2026	Pokoli Rokonok	TV Series	171	Composer
2024	Game Changers	TV Series	8	Additional composer
2023	Shakespeare 37	TV Series	1	Composer
2023	The Sound of Music: A Musical Declaration of Love	Documentary	—	Co-arranger, conductor, orchestrator
2023	Icons Unearthed	TV Series	8	Additional composer
2018–2023	Maine Cabin Masters	TV Series	4	Additional composer
2022	J-Style Trip	TV Series	1	Additional composer
2022	A Thousand Little Cuts	Film	—	Composer
2021	Wheeler Dealers	TV Series	9	Composer, additional music
2021	Behind the Attraction	TV Series	6	Composer, additional music
2021	The Movies That Made Us	TV Series	1	Composer, additional music
2021	OutDaughtered	TV Series	3	Composer, additional music
2021	Why the Sun and the Moon Live in the Sky	Short film	—	Music by
2020	Moving Past Trauma	Documentary	—	Music by, music editor
2020	Twisted Love	TV Series	5	Additional composer
2020	Little People, Big World	TV Series	1	Composer, additional music
2020	PGA Tour Golf	TV Series	2	Composer, additional music
2020	Rhythm of Love	Short film	—	Music composed and produced by, music director, producer
2020	Quarantine Music Chain	Short film	—	Lead composer, musical director, producer
2020	Obscene Beauty	Documentary	—	Composer, music producer, songwriter
2019	The Toys That Made Us	TV Series	4	Composer, additional music
2019	Canary in a Mine	Short film	—	Composer
2018–2019	Twisted Sisters	TV Series	16	Composer, additional music
2019	Love on Repeat	TV Movie	—	Composer
2015–2019	Celebrity Opera Series at the Broad Stage	TV Series	23	Music supervisor, camera operator
2019	Unfinished Business	Short film	—	Composer, performer, songwriter
2019	Kölcsönlakás	Film	—	Composer, conductor, orchestrator
2019	Beneath the Leaves	Film	—	Orchestrator
2018	JDM Legends	TV Series	6	Composer, additional music
2018	Koller Éva bátorsága	Short film	—	Composer
2018	Carnival Kings	TV Series	9	Additional composer
2018	Daily Blast Live	TV Series	3	Composer, additional music
2018	It's Suppertime!	TV Series	19	Composer, additional music
2018	The Tesla Files	TV Series	5	Composer, additional music
2017	Akil	Short film	—	Composer, re-recording mixer, sound engineer
2017	In the Hot Seat with DW	TV Series	4	Composer, main title composer
2017	Eva Kolosvary Artist at 80	Short documentary	—	Original music by, musician
2017	Meghalni Ukrajnáért	TV Movie	—	Composer
2017	La Douleur Exquise	Short film	—	Composer
2016	Last Vow	Short film	—	Composer
2016	The Story of Los Angeles Karpatok	Documentary	—	Drone cinematographer
2016	Search Party in Beverly Hills	Short film	—	Original music by
2016	The Game Creator	Film	—	Score composer
2015	Madeleine	Film	—	Score recording supervisor
2015	Chance of a Lifetime	Short film	—	Original music by
2014–2015	The Coffin Footage	Film	—	Composer, music producer
2015	Argo 2	Film	—	Composer
2014	Cinema Inferno	Documentary	—	Original music by
2014	Kényszerszinglik	TV Movie	—	Original music by
2014	The True Adventures of Raoul Walsh	Documentary	—	Composer, original music by
2014	Close Encounters of the Rural Kind	Documentary	—	Original music by
2014	Midnight in Hollywood	Short film	—	Composer, musician (piano)
2013	Elhallgatott gyalázat	TV Movie	—	Original music by
2013	Water, Our Past and Future	TV Series	9	Original music by
2013	A Matter of Death and Life	TV Movie	—	Composer
2012	Becsengetünk és elfutunk	TV Series	3	Composer, original music by
2012	Meldrum House	Short film	—	Composer
2011	Flow	Documentary	—	Composer
2011	A nagy duett	TV Series	8	Music producer
2011	Puss in Boots 3D	Video game	—	Composer
2011	Two Heart	TV Movie	—	Music composed by, music producer, performer
2010–2011	Csináljuk a fesztivált VI.	TV Series	—	Background music, music producer
2010	10 éves az Experidance	TV Movie	—	Original music by, music producer
2007–2010	Csináljuk a fesztivált I.	TV Series	96	Music producer
2009	Revolution Day Hungary	TV Movie	—	Original music by, music producer
2009	Fireworks Budapest	TV Movie	—	Original music by, music director, music producer
2009	Csináljuk a fesztivál turnét	TV Movie	—	Background music, music producer
2009	Csináljuk a fesztivált V	TV Series	16	Background score, music arranger, music producer
2008	Csináljuk a fesztivált IV	TV Series	13	Background music, music arranger, music producer
2008	És most mi csináljuk a fesztivált	TV Special	—	Background score, music producer
2008	Fire Dance	TV Movie	—	Original music by, orchestrator, music producer
2008	Csináljuk a fesztivált III.	TV Series	11	Background music, music arranger, music producer
2007–2008	Csináljuk a fesztivált II	TV Series	17	Composer, music producer
2007	Mi kérünk elnézést!	TV Series	2	Composer
2007	Szent István – Egy Ország Születése	TV Movie	—	Original music by, orchestrator, music producer
2007	Experidance: The Legend of Dance	TV Series	—	Composer
2007	Impossible Duets	TV Movie	—	Background music, music producer
2006	Köszönet a szabadság hőseinek	TV Movie	—	Composer, theme music composer
2005	Mr. Torma	Short film	—	Original music by, producer, sound mixer
2004	A mohácsi vész	Film	—	Music arranger
2000	E.Tango	TV Movie	—	Musician, music by, music arranger
