= Arlene Mosel =

American writer

Arlene Mosel

Arlene Tichy Mosel (August 27, 1921 – 15 May 1996) was an American children's librarian who wrote the text for two award-winning children's picture books illustrated by Blair Lent. Tikki Tikki Tembo won the annual Boston Globe–Horn Book Award and Lent won the annual Caldecott Medal for The Funny Little Woman.

== Biography ==
She was born as Arlene Tichy on August 27, 1921, in Cleveland, Ohio to Edward J. Tichy, an engraver and Marie Fingulin Tichy. She attended Ohio Wesleyan University, where she was awarded a Bachelor of Arts degree in 1942, and later attended Western Reserve University (now Case Western Reserve University) where she graduated with a Master of Science in Library Science degree in 1959. She married sales engineer Victor H. Mosel on December 26, 1942, with whom she had three children; Nancy Mosel Farrar, Joanne and James.

Mosel had been an assistant in the children's department at Enoch Pratt Free Library in Baltimore, before becoming an associate professor of library science at Case Western Reserve University. She was also an assistant coordinator of Children's Services at the Cuyahoga County Public Library.

The book Tikki Tikki Tembo was published by Holt in 1968 and illustrated by Blair Lent. It was presented as a retelling of a traditional Chinese story about a boy whose rescue after falling into a well was delayed due to his extremely lengthy name. The book was recognized as an ALA Notable Book and was recognized that year with the Boston Globe–Horn Book Award. In 1997, the book was selected by The New York Times on its list of the 50 best children's books of the previous 50 years. It has been suggested, however, that the story probably originated from the Japanese folktale Jugemu instead of a Chinese folktale.

In another collaboration with illustrator Blair Lent, Mosel's 1972 story The Funny Little Woman, published by E. P. Dutton, won the Caldecott Medal for illustration, and was recognized as an Honor Book for the Globe–Horn Book Award and the 1974 Hans Christian Andersen International Children's Book Awards.

Mosel died on 15 May 1996 in Indianapolis.
