= Tikki Tikki Tembo =

1968 picture book by Arlene Mosel

- Cover
- Author: Arlene Mosel
- Illustrator: Blair Lent
- Language: English
- Genre: Children's picture book
- Publisher: Holt, Rinehart and Winston
- Publication date: 1968
- Publication place: United States
- Media type: Print (hardcover)
- ISBN: 0805006621
- OCLC: 303376
- Dewey Decimal: 398.27/0951
- LC Class: PZ8.1.M8346 Ti

Tikki Tikki Tembo is a 1968 picture book written by Arlene Mosel and illustrated by Blair Lent. The book tells the story of a Chinese boy with a long name who falls into a well. It is an origin myth story about why Chinese names are so short today.

== Plot ==
Tikki Tikki Tembo is set in ancient China and invents a fictitious ancient Chinese custom whereby parents honor their first-born sons with long, elaborate names that everyone is obliged to say completely – no nicknames, no shortening of any kind – while second-born sons are typically given short, unimportant names. One of these boys is named Tikki Tikki Tembo No Sa Rembo Chari Bari Ruchi Pip Peri Pembo ("The Most Wonderful Thing in the Whole Wide World") who has a little brother Chang ("Little or Nothing"); their mother shows obvious favoritism towards her older son while often dismissing Chang.

One day the brothers are playing very close to a well at their house. Chang falls in the well and his older brother runs to their mother and tells her Chang has fallen down the well. Their mother tells him to get the Old Man with the Ladder. He goes and tells the Old Man. Chang is rescued and then recovers quickly, after which their mother forbids the two boys from playing by the well.

While initially keeping the promise to their mother, the boys go to the well again after a festival to eat their rice cakes. This time, the older brother falls in. Chang runs to their mother and tries to tell her that "Tikki Tikki Tembo-no Sa Rembo-chari Bari Ruchi-pip Peri Pembo has fallen into the well." At first, she cannot hear him so he says it again. However, because Chang is out of breath from running, he sputters and then mispronounces the name. His mother insists that he repeat the name—but with respect.

He tries repeatedly until finally, his mother tells Chang to get the Old Man with the Ladder. Chang goes to the Old Man with the Ladder. Initially, the old man does not respond because he is asleep. When Chang tries to wake him up, the Old Man with the Ladder—annoyed—tries to fall back asleep. After Chang breathlessly repeats his brother's predicament, the Old Man goes with Chang to save his brother from the well. They get Tikki Tikki Tembo-no Sa Rembo-chari Bari Ruchi-pip Peri Pembo from the well, but because of how long he had been in the well, due to his long name, it takes considerably longer for him to recover. The end of the story says that this is why all people now have short names, instead of great long names.

== Reception ==
The book received accolades upon publication. The Kirkus Review found the illustrations to be "a skillful counterpoint of diminutive detail and spacious landscape and a fine setting for a sprightly folktale." The book won a 1968 Boston Globe–Horn Book Award in the Picture Book category.

In 1997, The New York Times selected it as one of the 59 children's books of the previous 50 years. In a 1999–2000 National Education Association online survey of children, the book was one of the "Kids' Top 100 Books". Based on a 2007 online poll, the National Education Association listed the book as one of its "Teachers' Top 100 Books for Children". In a 2008 online poll of "Top 100 Picture Books" by School Library Journal, the book ranked 35th; in a similar 2012 poll, the book ranked 89th. According to the publisher, over one million copies of the book had been sold by 2013.

The 2009 audio book version of the story received a Parents' Choice Foundation rating of "Approved".

== Criticisms and inaccuracies ==
Cultural activists and Chinese citizens criticized the book for "reinforc[ing] the stereotype that Asian names sound like nonsense syllables",, and that the name of the title character sounds nothing like actual Chinese.

== Background ==
The publisher states that the author "first heard the story ... as a child" and that the book is her retelling of it. There are previous stories also set in China. However, the story is thought to have originated in Japan rather than China. Similar tales existed in Japan since the early 18th century, and have been introduced to the United States by 1900.

=== From Japan ===
In 1900, a poem "Teki-teki-no. A little Jap tragedy" by Jerome Davis Greene appeared on The Century Magazine. A child

Teki-teki-no, teki-suri-ombo, so-take-nudo, Harima-no-betto, Cha-wan-chaus'no, Fushimi-no-Esuke

drowns in the well. No sibling is mentioned in this version. Jerome Davis Greene was an American born in Yokohama, Japan. He moved to the United States and later became a businessman and organizer of Japanese studies.

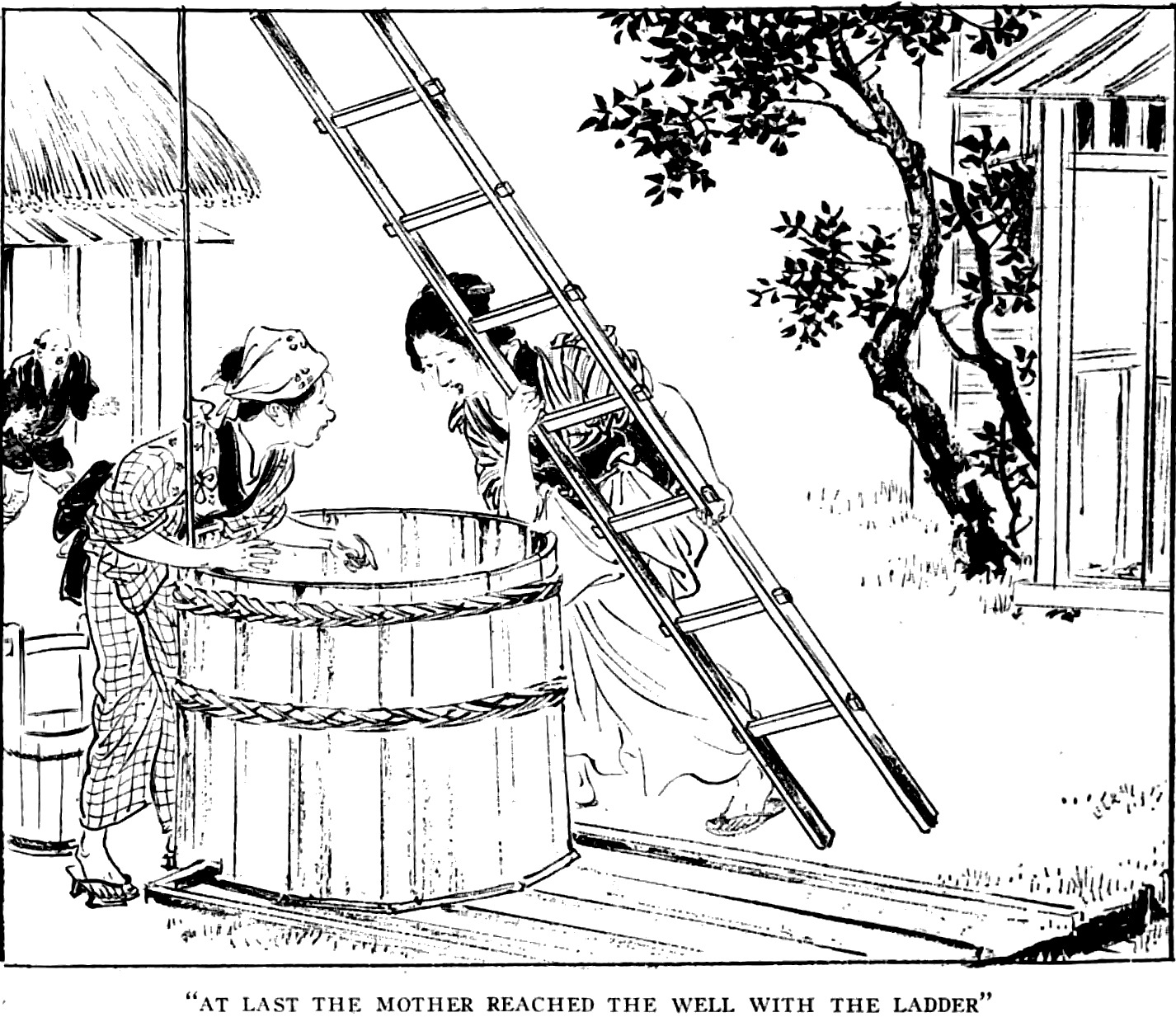
"The long-life name" (Illustration by Tekisui Ishii,1918)

Japanese novelist Etsu Inagaki Sugimoto introduced a tale called "The long-life name" in a 1918 issue of the children's magazine Everyland. It tells that a child was given a long name, in a wish to live for long. But the child

Het-toko het-toko hengo-no-kami, ik-kai niu-do waniudo, gaga-no fun-nai-zama, oodep-po kodep-po, sasara dep-po hibashi, ja-jan-janjan

drowns in the well. Sugimoto notes that she learned this tale during her childhood from her nurse.

=== Non-Japanese elements ===
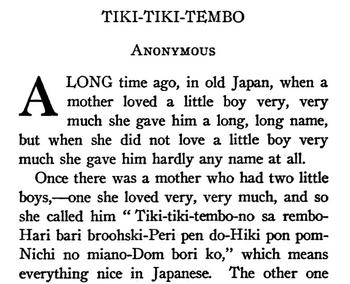
First part of "Tiki-Tiki-Tembo", a story published in 1924

In 1924, the National Association of Junior Chautauquas published a book that contained a story by an anonymous author entitled "Tiki-Tiki-Tembo"; the story concerned a boy "in old Japan" named:

Tiki-tiki-tembo-no sa rembo-Hari bari broohski-Peri pen do-Hiki pon pom-Nichi no miano-Dom bori ko

and his neglected sibling "Choi". After falling into the well, the title character "never grew up to be a fine Japanese man." It concludes that "And now in old [sic] Japan, boys are given tiny short names such as 'Su', 'Foy', 'Wang', or 'Sing' ". There are some non-Japanese elements in this version. A book published in 1968 (the same year as Tikki Tikki Tembo) reprinted the 1924 version of the story.

An early instance of Chinese setting is a 1941 (Note: Mosel was born in 1921 (Mosel, Arlene at the Library of Congress), so she was around 20 years old in 1941.) audio recording titled "Long-Name-No-Can-Say", adapted and narrated by Paul Wing. 1941 was in a time of strong anti-Japanese sentiment in the United States.

A boy named

"Nicki Nicki Tembo No So Rembo Ooma Moochi Gamma Gamma Goochi"

is fat and mean. He has 7 siblings: 6 elder sisters "Humph", "Lumph", "Mumph", "Bumph", "Dumph", "Gumph", and a younger brother "Yen". "Nicki Nicki Tembo[...]" falls into a well, but is eventually rescued.

Another recording titled "Sticky Sticky Stembo" was written by Selma R. Rich in 1953.

=== 1960s ===
There was a wave of publications through 1959 to 1961: a song by the Brothers Four, Shari Lewis's recording, a reissue of Paul Wing's recording, a book by Bryna Untermeyer, and possibly a narration on TV.

The Brothers Four's song "Sama Kama Wacky Brown" (lyrics by Ed Warren), from their eponymous first album in 1960, sings about

Eddie Koochy Katcha Kama Tosa Neera Tosa Noka Sama Kama Wacky Brown

who "fell into the deep, dark well" and drowned. The song is sometimes called "Eddie Brown".

Lamb Chop's puppeteer Shari Lewis released a story record "Tiki Tiki Timbo" around 1959. In the song, the older brother's name is

Tiki Tiki Timbo No Sin Nimbo Hoi Boi Boski Poi Pon Do Hiki Pon Pon Niki No Mi Ah Dom Poi

and his younger brother is "Choi". Tiki Tiki Timbo drowns in the well.

The 1960 reissue of Paul Wing's "Long-Name-No-Can-Say" narration is an omnibus with another fairytale that also has 7 supportive characters: Walt Disney's Snow White and the Seven Dwarfs.

A story published in 1961, called "The Little Boy With the Long Name", featured an older brother named

Sticky Sticky Stumbo Nos E Rumbo E Pro Pennyo Hara Bara Brisko Nicky Prom Po Nish No Mennyo Dumbricko",

named so in a belief that long name causes longevity. The story ends with the boy's death by drowning. The editor of this version is Bryna Ivens Untermeyer.

1967–1969 saw another wave: an LP record containing the 1961 Untermeyer's "Sticky Sticky Stumbo" version, Mosel's book, a reprint of the 1924 anonymous version, and Monty Python's TV show (1969 in UK, around 1974 in the US).

=== Criticism and subsequent versions ===
Since the 1980s, Mosel's version became criticized for misrepresenting Chinese culture.

"Pacho Nacho" published in 2020 is a rewrite of Mosel's version with settings changed to Hispanic America. One reviewer regarded this version suitable for people who hate racism. The author of "Pacho Nacho" states that the protagonist's name

Pacho-Nacho-Nico-Tico-Melo-Felo-Kiko-Rico

is composed from popular Spanish boys' nicknames.

== The Child with a Long Name ==
Japanese folklore studies classify Tikki Tikki Tembo-like tales as tale type NMS 638 The Child with a Long Name. (Note: Many other 3-digit type-codes exist.: Kunio Yanagita; No code is assigned in his Japanese edition: Catalog of Japanese Folktales (日本昔話名彙, Nihon mukashibanashi meii) (Yanagita 1948): "長い名の子供".; English translation by Fanny Hagin Mayer assigns an original number "234. The Child with a Long Name": The Yanagita Kunio Guide to the Japanese Folk Tale (1986); Online edition: Mayer, fanny Haggin; Yanagita, Kunio, eds. (n.d.) [1986]. "234. The Child with a Long Name". The Yanagita Kunio Guide to the Japanese Folk Tale. Translated by Mayer, fanny Haggin (Open Indiana ed.). Indiana University Press. ISBN 978-0-253-05556-9.; Original paper edition: Mayer, Fanny Haggin; Yanagita, Kunio, eds. (1986). "234. The Child with a Long Name". The Yanagita Kunio Guide to the Japanese Folk Tale. Translated by Mayer, Fanny Haggin. Bloomington, Indiana: Indiana University Press. pp. 232–233. ISBN 0-253-36812-X. "(p.iv) This book has been produced from camera-ready copy provided by Asian Folklore Studies, Nanzan University, Nagoya, Japan."; Keigo Seki; Compilation of Japanese Folktales (日本昔話集成, Nihon mukashibanashi shūsei) (Seki & 1958v3-2); p735: "638.長い名の子"; p905: "619.長い名の子 (638)"; "456. The Child with a long name", "NMS no. 638": Seki, Keigo (1966). "Types of Japanese folktales" (pdf). Asian Folklore Studies. 25 (1). Nanzan University: 210. doi:10.2307/1177478. JSTOR 1177478. ndldm:10208428 – via National Diet Library Digital Collections (Japan).; Hiroko Ikeda (folklorist); 2080 A Long Name: Ikeda, Hiroko (1971). "A type and motif index of Japanese folk-literature". FF Communications (209). Helsinki: Suomalainen Tiedeakatemia: 286–287. ISSN 0789-0249. OCLC 286392.; Koji Inada (folklorist); 857 長い名の子: General survey and analysis of Japanese folktales (日本昔話通観, Nihon mukashibanashi tsūkan) (Inada & 1988v28))

A typical specimen in Japanese folklore (reported in 1932):

The first child was given a convenient short name Chotto, but it soon dies. The parents think it must be because the name was too short, so they give their next child a long name:

Itchōgiri nichōgiri chōnai chōzaburō gorogoroyamano gorohēsaku atchiyama kotchiyama torino tossaka tateeboshi tonkarabyō

One day the child falls into a well. His friend goes to a house nearby and asks for a ladder, but the old woman there is deaf, so by the time the friend manages to bring the ladder, the child with a long name is dead.

Opinions vary regarding the similarity between NMS 638 The Child with a Long Name in Japan and folklore in other cultures. Keigo Seki assigns no equivalent Aarne–Thompson index (AT index), a comprehensive code system of European folktales. Koji Inada (folklorist) considers it partially similar to AT 1562A Barn is Burning. Inada finds no equivalent type indice in Korean folklore studies or in Chinese folklore studies. Folklorist D. L. Ashliman does not assign any AT index either, but remarks that the pattern in Tikki Tikki Tembo follows AT2021A The Death of the Little Hen.

=== History in Japan ===
A precursor, fables and jokes about people with long names, appeared at least by the 15th century. A manuscript written around 1490 has a fable about a nun who made up a "long" dharma name: "Ashakumyōkan", for herself. The manuscript is based on an earlier book of Buddhist fables. The nun's invention is a combination of Buddhist saints, deities and concepts. The moral is that such naming is a sign of greed, which is against Buddhist teachings.

An early full-formed version of The Child with a Long Name is the story published in 1703, "Yoku kara shizumu fuchi" ('Sunk down the waters for greed'), in a printed book of jokes created by rakugo comedian Yonezawa Hikohachi.

A stepmother renames her sons. The stepson whom she hates is given a short name Nyozegamo, and her precious own son is given a long Anokutarasambyakusambodai. One day, Nyozegamo falls into a river, but people swiftly rescue him. Another day, the mother's own son is swept by the river. She cries "Somebody, please! Anokutarasambyakusambodai is drowning!", but the boy is lost while she was calling out.

The punchline is a Japanese pun involving the word sambyaku.

=== Tekitekini... ===
A printed book of horror stories published in 1805 contains "Isshini imyōo tsukete kōkai seshi hanashi" ('A tale of a man who named his son with a strange name, and regretted it').

A man wishes to name his first son with a unique and long name. He consults a Confucian scholar, who recommends the name Mr. Daigaku shuki shouku shi teishino iwaku daigakuwa kōshino ishonishite shogaku tokuirunomon hyōe. A tutor of Japanese poetry sneers at this, opposing such use of foreign language to name a Japanese's son. The tutor proposes Nagakiyono tōnonefurino minamezame naminaminori funeno otono yoshibē, a traditional poem of good fortune. The scholar and the tutor starts quarrelling, so the father decides to make the name by himself. He solemnly declares it will be:

Tekitekini tekisuru onbō Sōrinbō sōtaka nyūdō Harimano bettō chawan chausuno hikigino Hyokosuke.

One day, the boy falls into a well. People panic to rescue the boy, but for every message they recite the long name. The boy dies, "blue and swollen".

The story gives no explanation of the origin or meanings of "Tekitekini[...]". The book was written by a storywriter and storyteller with pen name Tozuisha.

Other early records of this name include an 1893 book of fairy tales, where the child's name is Nīteki surionbō[...], and a lullaby Tekiteki onbō[...] in an 1898 catalog of folk songs. Polymath Minakata Kumagusu reported in 1913 a tongue twister Chiki chiki onbō[...] he learned 30 years ago, although this was played as a tongue twister, not a tale.

=== Jugemu ===
"Jugemu" is a very popular version in Japan today as of 2005. It is a rakugo comedy, and a 1912 document suggests that it may have existed since the mid-19th century. Extant records of the name "Jugemu" date back to 1884, and the full story from 1912. A typical version in 2022 goes:

A child is named

Jugemu Jugemu Gokō-no surikire Kaijarisuigyo-no Suigyōmatsu Unraimatsu Fūraimatsu Kūnerutokoro-ni Sumutokoro Yaburakōji-no burakōji Paipopaipo Paipo-no Shūringan Shūringan-no Gūrindai Gūrindai-no Ponpokopī-no Ponpokonā-no Chōkyūmei-no Chōsuke

One day he hits his friend's head, causing a bump. The friend protests to Jugemu's parents. But while reciting Jugemu's name, the bump heals, so evidence is lost.

"Jugemu" differs from typical The Child with a Long Name-type tales in that Jugemu himself does not suffer at all.

According to a memoire published in 1927, there was another rakugo performed around the 1880s.

The first child is named by a Shinto priest, but dies in infancy. So the parents ask a Buddhist priest to name their second child. The name is:

Animanimanimamane shiresharite shyamiyashyai taisentemokutemokute aishabisoishabi shaeashae shamiyaarokyabashabishyani abendaranebite atandahareshite ukuremukure arareharare shugyashiasanmasanbi budabikkiridjitchi darumaharishude sogyanekushane bashabashashudaimandarā

It is taken from a dharani (Buddhist chants in Sanskrit). One day the child falls into a well and drowns.

The punchline is an example of black humor relating Buddhist chants to Japanese funerals.

=== Folklore ===
Systematic collection of Japanese folklore began in the 1910s. A summary compilation published in 1958 lists 66 samples of The Child with a Long Name-type folktales in Japan.

=== Motifs ===
Examples of the short-named child's name are Chiyori (1914, folklore) and Chon (1921, children's literature).

Remarks like "That's why now people won't use too long names." can be seen in Japanese versions, such as a fairytale in an 1896 children's magazine.

== Editions and translations ==
Scholastic records released an LP record of the story in 1968. Weston Woods Studios produced a filmstrip and cassette tape version in 1970, which was later distributed on VHS and DVD.

Translations of the book include:

- Tikki Tikki tembo (1975, Afrikaans, ISBN 0949975257)
- Eka Tikki Tikki Tembo (1976, Zulu, ISBN 0869600648)
- Tikki, Tikki, Tembo (1994, Spanish, ISBN 1880507137)
- Tikki tikki tembo (1995, Xhosa, ISBN 1868430669)

== In popular culture ==
=== Tikki Tikki Tembo in popular culture ===
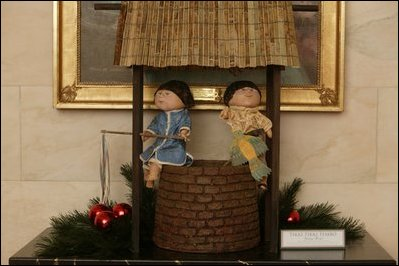
A White House 2003 Christmas decoration depicting a scene from Tikki Tikki Tembo

- In 1971 Canadian composer Harry Freedman set the story to music. His 10-minute work, entitled Tikki Tikki Tembo, is scored for narrator and woodwind quintet.
- A 1975 jazz album Brown Rice by Don Cherry contains the song "Brown Rice", in which the artist refers to Tikki Tikki Tembo.
- A 1990 punk rock album by the band Cringer was titled Tikki Tikki Tembo No Sa Rembo Chari Bari Ruchi Pip Peri Pembo.
- The 2003 Christmas decorations at the White House included a depiction of a scene from Tikki Tikki Tembo.
- A song by Welsh group Anweledig on their 2004 EP Byw is titled "Tikki Tikki Tembo" and tells some of the story.
- The 2010 song "Wildstyle Method" by Bassnectar says Tikki Tikki Tembo's full name during certain parts of the song.
- A variation of the tale was featured in an episode of Lamb Chop's Play-Along.

=== The Gamma Goochee ===
A 1965 pop rock song "(You Got) The Gamma Goochee" by Gamma Goochee Himself (John Mangiagli) chants

"Nicki Nicki Nimbo No So Limbo Oo Ma Moochi Gamma Gamma Goochee"

of "Long-Name-No-Can-Say". The song was covered by The Kingsmen (1965) which ranked #98 in Cashbox (magazine) singles. It was covered by other musicians too, such as The Persian Market (spelled "The Gamma Goochie"), and Joe Walsh (1991).

== See also ==
- Jugemu, a similar story from Japan.
