= Tazu Sasaki =

Japanese writer

- 佐々木 たづ
- Born: 28 June 1932; Tokyo, Japan
- Died: 3 April 1998 (age 65)
- Occupation: Writer
- Relatives: Yoda Gakkai (grandfather)

Tazu Sasaki (28 June 1932 – 3 April 1998; in Japanese 佐々木 たづ ) was a Japanese writer. Sasaki wrote fiction for children; she was known for her adaptations of Japanese fairy tales, and for a children's book about her guide dog, Roberta.

== Early life and education ==
Sasaki was born in Tokyo. Her father was a civil engineer. Her maternal grandfather was scholar Yoda Gakkai. She was a high school student when she lost sight in one eye; despite attempts at surgical intervention, her glaucoma advanced, and by 1953 she was completely blind. She learned to use braille, to type, and to speak English at a training school in Yokohama.

== Career ==
Sasaki published her first book of children's stories in 1958; the collection won Sasaki a cultural award from the Ministry of Health and Welfare. A second collection followed in 1960. In 1962, Sasaki traveled to England to work with Guide Dogs for the Blind at their training centre in Leamington. After five weeks, she returned to Japan with her first guide dog, Roberta; she was believed to be the first person in Japan to have a trained guide dog. She wrote about her life with Roberta in a 1964 book, Let's Go Now, Roberta.

In 1965, Sasaki met with Princess Alexandra, patron of the Guide Dogs for the Blind Association in Britain, at the British Trade Exhibition in Tokyo. In 1966 and 1967, Sasaki and Roberta traveled to the United States to study at Perkins School for the Blind in Boston. Roberta died in 1977.

== Publications ==
- The Golden Thread: Japanese Stories for Children (1968, English edition translated by Fanny Hagin Mayer, illustrated by Etsuko Suzuki)
- Let's Go Now, Roberta (1964, in Japanese Robata sa arukimasho)
- Kousagi Mashiro no ohanashi (1970)

== Personal life ==
Sasaki died in 1998, at the age of 65.
