= The Funny Little Woman =

1972 picture book by Arlene Mosel

- The Funny Little Woman
- Author: Arlene Mosel
- Illustrator: Blair Lent
- Language: English
- Genre: Children's picture book
- Publisher: E. P. Dutton/Penguin Young Readers
- Publication date: 1972
- Publication place: United States
- ISBN: 0-525-30265-4
- OCLC: 549397
- Dewey Decimal: 398.2/0952 E
- LC Class: PZ8.1.M8346 Fu

The Funny Little Woman is a book "retold by" Arlene Mosel. Released by E. P. Dutton, it was the recipient of the Caldecott Medal for illustration in 1973, and was illustrated by Blair Lent.

"The Old Woman who Lost her Dumplings" was the title of the original tale by Lafcadio Hearn, which Mosel had adapted.

== Plot ==
The story is set in old Japan. It is about is a funny little old woman. She likes to laugh ("Tee-he-he-he") and makes dumplings out of rice.

One day, one of her dumplings rolls down a hole. The little old woman chases the lost dumpling and ends up in a strange place underground, lined with Jizo (guardian statues). The Jizos warn the old woman not to go after the dumpling because of wicked oni (monsters) who live there, but she does anyway. Finally when the old woman sees her dumpling, and just as she is about to grab it, one of the oni grabs the old woman. And he takes her in a boat across a river to the house of the oni.

The oni forces the old woman to cook rice dumplings for dinner (for them). They give her a magic paddle to cook their dumplings from a single grain. The old woman enjoys being busy serving them plenty of rice dumplings for dinner every day.

But some years later, the old woman becomes homesick. One afternoon, she decided to return home. When the oni are not looking, the old woman takes the magic paddle, and escapes on a boat on the river. Soon the monsters found that the old woman was heading home. They try to stop her, but oni do not swim. So they drink all the river water.

When the water bed dries up, the boat gets stuck into the mud. The old woman (who was too worried to laugh) tried to run away. But she gets stuck in the mud, too. When she struggles, the oni all laugh. But by doing so, they accidentally release the water from their mouths back into the river. With the water coming back again, the old woman finishes her crossing to the other side in the boat.

The old woman returns home. She makes many rice dumplings with the magic paddle and sells them to people, and becomes "the richest woman in all of Japan."

Awards
Preceded by One Fine Day	Caldecott Medal recipient 1973	Succeeded by Duffy and the Devil
