= Servant × Service =

Japanese manga series by Karino Takatsu

- Cover of the first manga volume, featuring main character Lucy Yamagami

サーバント×サービス (Sābanto Sābisu)
- Genre: Comedy, slice of life
- Manga
- Written by: Karino Takatsu
- Published by: Square Enix
- English publisher: NA: Yen Press
- Magazine: Zōkan Young Gangan (2007–2010); Zōkan Young Gangan Big (2011); Monthly Big Gangan (2011–2014)
- Original run: June 29, 2007 – June 25, 2014
- Volumes: 4
- Anime television series
- Directed by: Yasutaka Yamamoto
- Produced by: Takamitsu Inoue; Masayuki Nishide
- Written by: Kento Shimoyama
- Music by: Monaca
- Studio: A-1 Pictures
- Licensed by: NA: Aniplex of America
- Original network: ABC, Tokyo MX, Tochigi TV, Gunma TV, Hokkaido Broadcasting Company, Chukyo TV, BS11, AT-X
- Original run: July 5, 2013 – September 26, 2013
- Episodes: 13
- icon

Servant × Service (Japanese: サーバント×サービス, Hepburn: Sābanto Sābisu) is a Japanese manga series written and illustrated by Karino Takatsu. It was serialized by Square Enix in Zōkan Young Gangan (2007–2010), Zōkan Young Gangan Big (2011) and Monthly Big Gangan (2011–2014), with its chapters collected in four tankōbon volumes. A 13-episode anime television series adaptation by A-1 Pictures was broadcast from July to September 2013.

== Plot ==
The story revolves around the daily lives of civil servants in a government office building in the fictional city of Mitsuba, Hokkaido. Lucy's parents had a very hard time picking a single name for her when she was born. Because of their indecisiveness, they decided to give her over a dozen different names, and this was legally approved by a civil servant no less. At an adult age, Lucy manages to land a job at the same public service office. But her reason is to seek revenge against the person who had legalized her ridiculously long name. Being a civil servant is not an easy job due to dealing with many angry citizens, facing different challenges, and having to put up with wacky co-workers each day. However, Lucy is determined to do whatever it will take to get her revenge. Newcomers Hasebe Yutaka, Yamagami, Miyoshi Saya, and their supervisor Ichimiya Taishi go through the everyday quirks of working at their office.

== Characters ==
=== Main characters ===
Lucy (...) Yamagami (山神 ルーシー（略）, Yamagami Rūshī (ryaku))
Voiced by: Ai Kayano
Lucy is a newcomer who decides to apply as a public servant to look for and take revenge on the man (himself a public servant) responsible for approving her rather long name given to her by her parents. She shows seriousness in her work, but is always the target of Yutaka's pranks. Her real name, or least part of the name she could mention, is Lucy Kimiko Akie Airi Shiori Rinne Yoshiho Chihoko Ayano Fumika Chitose Sanae Mikiko Ichika Yukino Reina Eri ... (still continues).
She has a cowlick (ahoge) sticking up on her head—a trait inherited from her mother, according to the flashback in the first episode—which reacts according to her mood or emotions. Out of all the three new employees, she seems to be the most naïve and low guarded. She dislikes Hasebe at first because of his constant teasing of her, but throughout the story, she begins to notice his feelings towards her. In the final episode, when Hasebe asked her out, she says "not yet", which implies that she is now more conscious of him and may have developed feelings towards him too.
Yutaka Hasebe (長谷部 豊, Hasebe Yutaka)
Voiced by: Tatsuhisa Suzuki
The only male among the three newcomers, who is notorious for goofing off at work, asking for the email addresses of any girl he meets which he never uses to contact them, and teasing Lucy. Despite his easy-going slacker image, he in fact shows some talent in his line of duty in the least expected situations, like in episode 3, when he is seen to be able to do ventriloquism and use sign language. At home he is not as hyper as he is in the office due to always tiring himself out playing computer games. He has a sister named Kaoru, who is also a civil servant, and is even more rambunctious than Hasebe is. Among his family he is actually the least hyper. He seems to have feelings for Lucy and has asked her out twice, only to be "shot down" both times. It was unclear whether he was serious in the beginning but, in episode 8, it is confirmed that Hasebe has feelings for Lucy when he says to her "I was pretty serious all this time, but at this rate, I'll really fall deep in love with you". In episode 12, Hasebe and Lucy have their first date but is unable to finish it due to Hasebe's family circumstances. At the end of the episode, it is revealed that Hasebe's father is the public servant who approved Lucy's long name.
Saya Miyoshi (三好 紗耶, Miyoshi Saya)
Voiced by: Mai Nakahara
A 24-year-old college graduate and a soft-spoken girl who tends to keep her opinions of other people to herself. She was first assigned as one of many front desk officers, and spends most of her time listening to the never-ending rants of their older customers, especially the elderly Mrs. Tanaka. She develops an awkward relationship with Mrs. Tanaka's grandson Jōji, whom she feels infiltrated by his habit of carrying her for nonsense, though she has developed a better feeling to him.
Megumi Chihaya (千早 恵, Chihaya Megumi)
Voiced by: Aki Toyosaki
A social service employee who is actually working as a temporary employee with a shorter shift than others. She is rather aloof towards her co-workers, and is revealed to be an avid fan of the magical girl series Magical Flowers. When she is not at work, she attends cosplay events dressed as Gerbera Pink, one of the characters of the series. She openly desires to see Lucy cosplay as one of the other characters from "Magical Flowers" due to her dark hair and large bust. She hates Hasebe getting too close to Lucy in case he convinces her to cosplay before she does. She has been dating Ichimiya for over a year, and has tried to make it clear to him that she doesn't care if he prioritizes Tohko on Christmas because of comiket.
Taishi Ichimiya (一宮 大志, Ichimiya Taishi)
Voiced by: Takahiro Sakurai
Taishi is a supervisor in the health and welfare office and the one in charge of Lucy and her friends. Although kind and approachable, Taishi is prone to be bossed around, particularly by his sister. He has been dating Chihaya for over a year, but worries about getting dumped before Christmas, since Toko's birthday is on the same day and he always prioritizes Toko, though Chihaya, due to her own Christmas cosplay commitments, doesn't seem to care.
Kenzo Momoi (百井 兼蔵, Momoi Kenzō)
Voiced by: Rikiya Koyama
The Section Chief of the Health and Welfare Department. He is first introduced as a talking stuffed rabbit in episode 4 due to his extreme shyness. He sometimes falls prey, though, to the mood of his subordinates--and is either stomped on or has the fur plucked off of him like petals on a flower as a result. He is also an old friend of Hasebe's father.
Tōhko Ichimiya (一宮 塔子, Ichimiya Tōko)
Voiced by: Rumi Ōkubo
Taishi's tsundere younger sister, noted for having a peculiar marking under her right eye similar to the "bulging vein" image used to depict a person when angry. Staying true to this quirky trait, Tōhko is often in a bad mood and has a short temper. On the other hand, she seems to have a brother complex. Ever since learning about her older brother's interest in working as a public servant, Tōhko started learning more about the job, and by high school is knowledgeable enough to give surprise quizzes to employees every time she visits her brother's workplace. Her birthday is on Christmas Eve.

=== Minor characters ===
Mrs. Tanaka (田中, Tanaka-san)
Voiced by: Mikako Takahashi
An old lady living in the ward who frequents the office to visit Miyoshi. She always talks about her daughter-in-law and has a grandson who happens to be Yutaka's childhood friend and rival. Although she tried to get Miyoshi to marry her grandson, she stops talking about him when she realizes that Miyoshi hates him.
Jōji Tanaka (田中 譲二, Tanaka Jōji)
Voiced by: Tetsuya Kakihara
Tanaka-san's grandson. He is a 22-year-old single banker. As Yutaka's childhood friend, he never beats Yutaka in anything, leading to a very awkward friendship. It also seems that he might have unrequited feelings towards Yutaka as indicated by Chihaya.
Kaoru Hasebe (長谷部 薫, Hasebe Kaoru)
Voiced by: Yu Kobayashi
Yutaka's sister. She likes to play pranks on people, such as on Lucy when she spent the night at her house after an office dinner rendered her too drunk. As she realizes that Yutaka one-sidedly loves Lucy, she tries to set them up so that Lucy will fall in love with Yutaka.
Kanon Momoi (百井 花音, Momoi Kanon)
Voiced by: Rina Hidaka
Kenzo Momoi's daughter and also Touko's high school friend. She is cute looking and looks like her father. She doesn't seem to be bothered by her dad's outer appearance and always covers up for him. She is also smart and understands situations very well. Although she discovers Taishi and Chihaya were dating, she tries to keep a straight face when Tōko finds out.
Lucy's Dad (山神 父)
Voiced by: Akira Ishida
Lucy's Mom (山神 母)
Voiced by: Fumiko Orikasa
Lucy's parents. Due to them asking other people's opinions for the name of their daughter and not being able to decide which one to use, they named their daughter using all those names.
Hasebe's Dad (長谷部 父)
Voiced by: Daisuke Namikawa
Yutaka and Kaoru's dad who worked as a ward office staff member when Lucy was born. He approved the application for Lucy's ridiculous long name, and is the target of Lucy's revenge. He is also an old friend of the Section Chief.

== Media ==
=== Manga ===
Written and illustrated by Karino Takatsu, Servant × Service started in the Square Enix's Young Gangan's spin-off magazine Zōkan Young Gangan on June 29, 2007. It was published until October 2010, and then, the magazine changed its name to Zōkan Young Gangan Big, where the series was published from April to August 2011. The magazine began as a standalone one, titled Monthly Big Gangan on October 25, 2011, where the series was published until June 25, 2014. Square Enix collected its chapters in four tankōbon volumes, released from September 24, 2011, to August 25, 2014.

It has been released in the United States by Yen Press in 2015 digitally (in four single volumes) and in 2016 physically (in two omnibus volumes).

=== Anime ===
A 13-episode anime adaptation produced by A-1 Pictures and directed by Yasutaka Yamamoto began airing on ABC on July 5, 2013, and were later aired on Tokyo MX, Tochigi TV, Gunma TV, Hokkaido Broadcasting Company, Chukyo TV, BS11 and AT-X. In addition the series uses character designs done by Terumi Nishii based on the original designs by Karino Takatsu, while the series composition and script are done by Kento Shimoyama, along with sound direction by Akiko Fujita and music by monaca. Aniplex of America had obtained licensing rights to the series for home video release, while Crunchyroll had obtained the series for streaming in select parts of the world.

The opening theme is "May I Help You?" (めいあいへるぷゆー?) by Ai Kayano, Mai Nakahara and Aki Toyosaki whilst the ending theme is "Hachimitsu Doki" (ハチミツ時間（どき, lit. Honey Time), sung by Ai Kayano from episode 1 to episode 4, episode 5 to 8 by Mai Nakahara, and episode 9 to 12 is sung by Aki Toyosaki.

==== Episodes ====
No.	Title	Original release date
1	"Be Careful About How You Refer to Someone and Why" "Kiwotsukeyō Hito no Yobikata Sono Riyū" (気をつけよう 人の呼び方 その理由)	July 5, 2013
Lucy Yamagami, Yutaka Hasebe, and Saya Miyoshi are introduced to the Ward Office as new civil servants and are placed under the care of their upperclassman Taishi Ichimiya, who is rather unreliable. Yutaka is very relaxed to the point of slacking off every chance he gets, while Saya is very nervous because this is her first job. Lucy is introduced to Megumi Chihaya, who is a very low-key and emotionless person. After the first few hours or so, the three newbies meet up again and share their disappointments. Saya was caught up in a long story with Mrs. Tanaka, unable to escape; Lucy was scolded by a customer for taking too long in directing her to the right window; Yutaka was disheartened to discover that he couldn't slack off as frequently as he would've liked. Later however, Lucy is shown making great progress, much to Saya's admiration. Afterwards, Yutaka, Taishi, and Saya find out that she's a modern day Jugemu (a great source of embarrassment for her), due to her parents not being able to decide on one first name. Lucy reveals that the real reason she joined the civil service was to get revenge on the civil servant who carelessly allowed her birth certificate to pass without raising a single question about her name. Hasebe begins calling her by the first part of her name, to Lucy's great displeasure. After rescuing Lucy twice from some customers, her opinion of him changes, until he begins to make fun of her name again. Taishi and Saya later comment that although Lucy holds a grudge against the civil service, she's actually suited for the job.
2	"Don't Panic, Make a Scene, or Throw Away Your Job" "Oshigoto wa Awatezu Sawagazu Nagedasazu" (お仕事は 慌てず騒がず 投げ出さず)	July 12, 2013
Lucy sees Saya hiding under her desk and discovers that she was trying to stay out of Mrs. Tanaka's sight to avoid listening to more stories, but consequently, as Yutaka points out, she can't do her work. Saya is ashamed because she's unable to work, so Lucy goes to Megumi for advice, who tells her that she will think on it. Megumi asks Lucy to cover for her the next day, and it is revealed that she is going to attend a cosplay event. Megumi tells Lucy that she became a temporary worker so that she would be able to continue to cosplay while working. She later becomes obsessed with trying to get Lucy to cosplay as Black Rose, a companion of Megumi's character, Gerbera Pink, and Lucy reluctantly agrees to think about it. Later, Tōko (a high school girl) comes to visit the office and gives Yutaka, Saya, and Lucy a test to see if they can do their new jobs properly. Yutaka demonstrates his surprisingly amazing memory by reciting a nurse insurance law, receiving Tōko's e-mail address as a reward. Saya's nervousness causes Tōko to become angry, and Mrs. Tanaka comes to the rescue by scolding her harshly. Tōko is relieved to see that Lucy is normal, until she asks Lucy her name, to which Lucy recites her entire name. Tōko, fed up with the newbies, complains to Taishi, who tells her that she's bothering everyone around her. She begins crying, so he hugs her and gives her money to placate her before sending her home. Saya then discovers that Tōko's full name is Tōko Ichimiya, thus making her Taishi's little sister. Taishi shares the story about how Tōko came to love the ward office, but it is clear that what Tōko adores is her brother, not the office. Afterwards, Megumi sees that Saya has a hard time saying what's on her mind, so she enlists Tōko's help in getting Saya to talk openly. Saya tells Tōko that if she continues to abuse her brother, he will never understand her true feelings, causing Tōko to cry again. Taishi tells her not to come back because she keeps bothering others, but Saya saves her by asking her to come back to help her learn more, though this causes Saya to lose even more time for working.
3	"Don't Neglect the Safety of You or Your Workplace" "Okotaru na Shokuba no Anzen Mi no Anzen" (怠るな 職場の安全 身の安全)	July 27, 2013
Megumi rebukes Taishi for questioning her on whether he is a reliable senpai before giving her an assessment of Lucy. Feeling incompetent, Taishi reverts to his old habits with Lucy but Tōko sees him patting Lucy's head. After giving Lucy a hard time, Tōko delivers Taishi's bento she especially made for him as an excuse to have lunch with him. In the records room, Lucy breaks her bra forcing her to wear the office uniform. As she interacts with Saya, Megumi, Taishi, and Yutaka they all come to notice that something is wrong with her bra. At lunch the four contemplate how to address Lucy's predicament with her however Yutaka takes the initiative and realizing his intentions, the other three agree forcing her to go home. The next day, Yutaka talks with Taishi about not being able to get Lucy's email address as he attempts to do so. Seeing her leaving though, he follows her and invites her out to lunch while at a bookstore where she reveals that she usually doesn't have money before payday as she buys too many books. Even after dinner, he forgets to ask for her email address. In the supply room, Yutaka and Taishi hear out Lucy's insecurities about her abilities and name. Later as she is having trouble with a child, Yutaka arrives to entertain the girl as Lucy realizes he is able to use ventriloquism. Yutaka meets Lucy a few times while it is raining and discovers that she is afraid of lightning and thunder. He helps Lucy but has some fun as he tells Megumi that Lucy was busy for so long due to filling out the name section on documents. Lucy oversees Yutaka using sign language and ends up questioning him about himself. As they're talking, Lucy agrees to learn sign language but not before she repays the previous favor which ends up being settled by her telling Yutaka her cup size. A shocked Yutaka starts counting to verify her size as Lucy yells at him to stop before running off. In the end, Yutaka forgets yet again to ask Lucy her email address.
4	"Beware of Next Week's Unseen Danger" "Raishū no Mienai Kiken ni Yōchūi" (来週の 見えない危険に 要注意)	July 27, 2013
Megumi and Yutaka are now rivals concerning Lucy. -Yutaka asks Lucy out twice, but gets rejected. -They go for a drink with the section manager of their section and Lucy and Yutaka end up in a hotel.
5	"Everyone Has Close Calls. Learn from Them and Keep the Workplace Healthy" "Minna ga Motteru Hiyari no Taiken Ikashite Kyou mo Kenzen Shokuba" (皆が持ってる ヒヤリの体験 活かして今日も 健全職場)	August 2, 2013
-Lucy thanks Yukata and his sister for taking care of her. -It is revealed, that Taishi has a girlfriend, which is Megumi. -They meet at Taishi's but get surprised when Tohko comes home. They handle the situation.
6	"Examine Unexpected Problems and Hide-and-Seek" "Tashikamete Omowanu Mondai Kakurenbo" (確かめて 思わぬ問題 かくれんぼ)	August 9, 2013
-The section manager tries to get closer to his servants. -Saya thinks about quitting her job. -Tanaka wants Saya to marry her grandson.
7	"Self Prevention, There Are People Where You Can't See" "Jiko bōshi mienai tokoro ni hito ga iru" (自己防止 見えない所に 人が居る)	August 16, 2013
-Megumi visits Toko at home. -The section manager thinks, that Taishi and Megumi do not get on well together, because of her cold reactions towards him, and puts them together in the store room. -Tanaka's Grandson visits Saya at work. -It seems, that Tanaka feels attracted to Yutaka.
8	"A Dangerous Sprout, Beware Tanaka's Grandson" "Kiken no Me Tanaka no Mago ni Goyōjin" (危険の芽 田中の孫に 御用心)	August 23, 2013
-Lucy and Yutaka go for dinner again. -Tanaka drags Lucy to go for dinner with him and talk about their relationship between them and Yutaka, but get interrupted by the latter. -The next day Lucy wants to thank Yutaka by going on a date with him in two months.
9	"Do you have it? Mental Capacity and the Accumulation of Feelings" "Arimasu ka Kokoro no Yutori to Tsumikasane" (ありますか 心のゆとりと 積み重ね)	August 30, 2013
Lucy laments over her date predicament while a mentally lapsing Megumi contemplates her situation realizing the fact that she hasn't gone out on a date in a long time. Megumi recollects about herself two years ago when she dressed plainly and how Taishi got involved with her. Annoyed by Taishi, Megumi heads back to work where she dictates to Lucy that they will go shopping for her skirt. At the store, Lucy and Megumi meet Saya and Tōko but the latter two leave due to Lucy being self conscious about her clothing and her ability to wear almost all kinds. Lucy takes on a new attitude after Megumi tells her that looking down on herself is rude to others around her. At work the next day the two run into Yutaka where Lucy says she wanted to accompany him until the end, naively implying marriage. While Saya and Lucy are talking, Kaoru appears and takes the two out to eat where she recollects to the two about Jōji. At work, Yutaka believes that Lucy is getting married leaving him in a distraught mood. In the break room, Lucy tells him about her Tosho card while congratulating him about Kaoru's engagement as he gets a text from his sister saying she is the one getting married. Embarrassed at his misunderstanding, he slams his phone to the floor telling Lucy that he'll get a new one as he was going to erase all the girls' emails he had anyway. Not understanding, Yutaka tells Lucy it means he doesn't need any other girl than her. Lucy is seen in blushingly high spirits after that while Yutaka is secluded at his desk.
10	"It'll Be Good Later, At the Same Time Good Things Can Cause Huge Regrets" "Atode ii Tsuide de ii wa Ookina Koukai" (あとで良い ついでで良いは 大きな後悔)	September 6, 2013
With Taishi not home, Megumi plans on telling Tōko she is going out with her brother. Exhausted from studying so much and eating the cake that Megumi brought, Tōko misinterprets what Megumi is saying and eventually falls asleep. Relaxing too much, Megumi falls asleep with Tōko's head in her lap. After arriving home, Taishi annoys Megumi once again. At work, Megumi discusses Tōko's studying with Saya but Saya reveals that she knows Megumi and Taishi are going out telling her not to worry too much. After work Jōji meets Saya on her way out as he is trying to challenge Yutaka. As Megumi ponders about the Ichimiya siblings, Lucy echoes Saya's earlier comments toward Megumi. Outside of the building, due to Saya's comments about his actions, Jōji is led to tears causing a scene for Saya. The next day Saya has "hangover from regrets". Kanon visits the welfare office to meet with Tōko but kills some time wandering around where she meets Yutaka several times. Attempting to play off his slacking as actual work, he's caught by Taishi. Kanon meets Lucy who recommends the shop on the first floor but on her way there, passes by Megumi who asks her for her measurements. Heading to Saya, Kenzo accidentally runs across her and Tōko talking where he passes himself off as being a simple stuffed animal. As she is leaving, Tōko remembers she left her phone at Saya's desk but when she goes to pick it up, she sees everyone talking to Kenzo. She's left with the belief that they're all doing it because she has been too hard on them. As she is about to apologize to her brother and Yutaka, she sees Lucy with Kenzo on her head and Saya walking chatting with each other. Discovering the bunny is actually the section manager, she runs off embarrassed by her actions. The next day Kanon drops off her dad believing each of his subordinates to be weird but with them agreeing that he is the weirdest of them all.
11	"Beware the Sweet Trap that Tries to Lure You In" "Atenshon Anata o Nerau Amai Wana" (アテンション あなたを狙う 甘い罠)	September 13, 2013
Yutaka is still trying to avoid Lucy after that "confession" an episode ago. Lucy tries to talk to him and looks for him, but everyone says he's just slacking around somewhere. Kenzo finds her later and accompanies her to go look for him. In the process Kenzo was accidentally sold as a stuffed toy at the outdoor bazaar outside the city hall. He is recovered just in time when the girl who bought him immediately grabbed the substitute stuffed bunny "because it was cuter," much to his chagrin. Later, as Yutaka tries to hide by eating his lunch at the rooftop, he finds Lucy in there eating bread crusts for lunch, hoping that she would find him in there. As he gives him the sandwich he has Lucy explains her actions back then, her being not used to men being around her. Meanwhile, Saya, while trying to psyche herself up before her date with Joji, decides to go into town on her day-off, where she weirdly comes across everyone in the office--Lucy, Megumi, Yutaka, Taishi, even Kanon and Kenzo and Mrs. Tanaka herself. Yutaka hears of Joji's date with Saya (when Saya consulted with Megumi and Lucy), so he warns him not to do weird things to her. During the date they talk of nothing but Yutaka, so when Saya tried to change the subject, she becomes amused when she finds out he can't talk of anything (familiar) other than his "rival." And before he could talk about certain regrets, Saya fainted after taking a sip of red wine. She later finds herself being carried by Joji quite a distance from the restaurant. He said he had fun during the date, and asks her for another one for later, to which she agrees. The next day, amidst a hangover, she tells Yutaka that Joji is fine if he's not involved.
12	"Wait a Moment, Being Accustomed and Being Unprepared Are Life-Threatening" "Chotto Mate nare to Yudan ga Inochidori" (一寸待て 慣れと油断が 命取り)	September 20, 2013
Megumi took three days off to finish all of her costume projects, including the dress Lucy is to wear during her date with Yutaka. Megumi warned Taishi not to text her, call her, or come to her apartment, but he goes to her apartment on the third day to check her out anyway, and as a result he weaseled out of that shopping trip he promised Toko, much to her disdain. He finds the door to her apartment unlocked, and, as he entered, sees her on the floor, flat, but all work completed. He later helped clean her apartment, make food, and become her pillow for the rest of the night. The next day, before her date, Megumi instructs Lucy to watch Yutaka and find out what kind of person he really is, to see if he is a decent guy or not. Lucy was shocked to find out that the dress she is to wear was too short, but Megumi insists it's okay. But she is so embarrassed with the dress that she even thinks of postponing it. In fact, on the day of her date with Yutaka, Lucy did arrive around twenty minutes late. During the date Lucy did observe that he paid attention to her, even being protective of her. She even got freaked out by Yutaka's in-date behavior that she ran like mad and tripped. As Yutaka tended to the scratch on her knee, she confronted Lucy about her problem that is her long, ridiculous name. He also asked her as to how she thinks of him. Lucy, nervous, is unable to give an answer, until Yutaka got a call about his sister Kaoru's marriage meeting, and he was requested to come, ending the date early; but Lucy says they can do it again some time. Megumi is lurking in the shadows ready to intervene if something goes wrong, while trying to tell Toko, who is with her, about her relationship with her brother. There she finds out that Toko doesn't mind if her brother has a girlfriend. The next day Yutaka does his work without slacking off, though with some mistakes. Taishi, Saya, and Megumi notices this and finds it worrisome, and, asking him, they find out the (shocking) reason: that the one who approved Lucy's name was his own father.
13	"Now We're Set, A Fun Workplace Leading to Tomorrow" "Korede Yoshi Ashita ni Tsunagu Tanoshii Shokuba" (これで良し 明日につなぐ 楽しい職場)	September 27, 2013
As Taishi, Saya, and Megumi found the reason of Yutaka's weird behavior, they also knew another reason why Yutaka avoided Lucy. It was because at the day Lucy's name was brought to the ward office, Yutaka was down in a high fever until he was taken into a hospital. His father became so worried about him and thus couldn't concentrate in his work, which was why he accidentally approved Lucy's name without even thinking about it any further. Depressed by the truth that he was the indirect reason why Lucy had a long name, Yutaka was afraid that Lucy would hate him since she was so concerned about her name. The three tried to cheer him up, but in the end they only made it worse. When Lucy came into the room, they quickly changed the subject, and Lucy saw Yutaka's dejected and sad face towards her. Because of this, she became concerned that maybe she had done something bad to Yutaka. One day when Lucy was about to go home, Taishi went to Yutaka and cheered him up, by saying that it will be harder to say the truth the longer he holds it in. Cheered up by Taishi's words, Yutaka chased after Lucy and finally told the truth to her. However, Lucy didn't think that Yutaka was at fault since anyone could catch a fever. Because of Yutaka's insistence, Lucy assumed that if everything was Yutaka's fault, he had to take responsibility. She asked him to keep calling her by her first name because she began to like him calling her Lucy all the time. Just when Yutaka was about to confess to her, Joji, Kanon, Toko, and Kenzo suddenly came in, ruining the mood. The three who was listening all the time shoved all of them away, and the mood became awkward once again. When the two of them were outside, Yutaka once again tried to ask Lucy out. The latter only rejected, but gave him a hope by saying, "Not yet". The others quickly caught up to the two and started to ruin the mood again. The next day, Taishi tried to tell Toko about his relationship with Megumi, only to fail since he was nervous. Yutaka became so energetic and enthusiastic in his work. Saya reprimanded Joji for ruining Lucy's and Yutaka's moments. As the two's mood were getting better, all of them were back to their jobs. After the ending credits, Yutaka finally got Lucy's email address and Megumi told them to explode.

== Reception ==
Jacob Chapman of Anime News Network reviewed the complete anime series in 2014, giving it an overall C+ rating. He was critical of the unfunny comedy and slow pacing of its consequence-free storylines resulting in the show being "boring and pointless" at various points, but was commendable towards the female cast having "enough personality" and cuteness during their relationships to give viewers a "benign and charming" experience and gave credit to the humor for not being obnoxious and "a little ambitious for a gag strip" adaptation, concluding that: "It's never a regrettable viewing experience, but it's got forgettable stored up in bulk." Nicole MacLean, writing for THEM Anime Reviews, felt the series lacked enough witticism and over-the-top characters to deliver its "tentative humor" and go beyond the "mundane nature of its setting", concluding that: "I really wanted to like this show, but it's honestly a bit boring. Your mileage may vary depending on your taste in comedy, but in my opinion it's badly hurt by its own tentativeness."

== See also ==
- Working!!, another manga series by the same author
