= Blair Lent =

American children's book illustrator and writer (1930–2009)

- Born: January 22, 1930; Boston, Massachusetts, U.S.
- Died: January 27, 2009 (aged 79); Medford, Massachusetts, U.S.
- Education: School of the Museum of Fine Arts, Boston
- Occupations: Illustrator, writer
- Writing career
- Pen name: Ernest Small
- Genre: Children's literature
- Notable awards: Caldecott Medal (1973)

Blair Lent (January 22, 1930 – January 27, 2009), who sometimes wrote as Ernest Small, was an American illustrator and writer of children's books, perhaps best known for those with Chinese themes such as Tikki Tikki Tembo (1968). He won the 1973 Caldecott Medal for U.S. picture book illustration, recognizing The Funny Little Woman by Arlene Mosel. Lent used a wide range of techniques in his illustrations, including acrylic painting, cardboard cutouts, colored pencil and ink and wash.

Born in Boston, Lent attended the Boston Museum School where he graduated with a degree in art in 1953, after which he went to Italy and Switzerland on a study grant. He worked for the Container Corporation of America designing labels for cans and worked for the Bresnick Advertising Company where he designed bank advertisements.

After receiving positive feedback from a juvenile-books editor at Atlantic Monthly Press, he put out Pistachio, a story published in 1964 about a green cow and a circus that he wrote and illustrated. Under the pen name of Ernest Small, he wrote the 1966 books Baba Yaga about a witch, and John Tabor's Ride, a fanciful yarn about a sailor from New England. Other works written and illustrated by Lent include 1987's Bayberry Bluff, Molasses Flood published in 1992 and his 2000 book Ruby and Fred.

Lent also did illustrations for other authors, some of which became his best-known works, such as the 1964 book The Wave by Margaret Hodges that adapted a story by Lafcadio Hearn, Arlene Mosel's 1968 Chinese folk tale Tikki Tikki Tembo, the 1968 book Why the Sun and the Moon Live in the Sky based on an African folk tale as told by Elphinstone Dayrell, a 1968 retelling of Hans Christian Andersen's The Little Match Girl and Mosel's 1973 retelling of a Japanese folk tale The Funny Little Woman that won that year's Caldecott Medal. In 1997, Tikki Tikki Tembo was selected by The New York Times on its list of the 50 best children's books of the previous 50 years.

Lent's artwork had been contributed to the Kerlan Collection at the University of Minnesota and the Mazza Museum at the University of Findlay, in Findlay, Ohio.

Lent was a resident of Cambridge, Massachusetts and died at age 79 on January 27, 2009, of pneumonia in Medford, Massachusetts.
