= Fanny Hagin Mayer =

American folklorist (1899–1990)

- Born: Fanny Alice Hagin; September 3, 1899; Shenandoah, Iowa, U.S.
- Died: November 6, 1990 (aged 91); Whittier, California, U.S.
- Other names: Fanny Alice Mayer, Fannie Alice Mayer
- Occupations: Educator, folklorist, translator, writer

Fanny Alice Hagin Mayer (September 3, 1899 – November 6, 1990) was an American folklorist, translator, and educator. Her work focused on Japanese folktales.

== Early life and education ==
Hagin was born in Shenandoah, Iowa, the daughter of Fred Eugene Hagin and Myrtle Edith Willett Hagin. She lived in Japan during her childhood, while her father worked there as a Christian missionary. She graduated from Glendale Union High School and from Occidental College. She earned a master's degree from the University of Southern California.

== Career ==
Hagin taught school in California from 1928 to 1947; she was a vice principal at a junior high school and president of the Toastmistress Club of Glendale. She was a member of the WACs during World War II. After the war she worked in Japan for the Allied occupation forces based in Niigata, as an assistant officer focusing on education and women's affairs. In 1950, she became chair of the English department at Tsuda College. She was a lecturer at Tokyo Gakugei University in 1959. In 1960, she spoke at a festival of Asian music and arts at UCLA. In 1963, she taught at Sophia University in Tokyo.

== Publications ==
Mayer's work appeared in academic publications including Folklore Studies, Midwest Folklore, Anthropos, Japan Quarterly, Asian Folklore Studies, Monumenta Nipponica, Japanese Journal of Religious Studies, and Journal of Japanese Studies.

- "Japanese Folk Tales" by Yanagita Kunio (1952, translator)
- "Collecting Folk Tales in Niigata, Japan" (1959)
- "Character Portrayal in the Japanese Folk Tale" (1960)
- "Tales for the Little New Year" (1966)
- "Kenichi Mizusawa, a Modern Collector of Japanese Folk Tales" (1967)
- The Golden Thread: Japanese Stories for Children by Tazu Sasaki (1968, translator)
- "Available Japanese Folk Tales" (1969)
- About Our Ancestors: The Japanese Family System by Yanagita Kunio (1970, co-translator with Ishiwara Yasuyo)
- "Even a Mudsnail" (1970)
- "The Devoted Fox-Wife" (1971)
- "Religious concepts in the Japanese folk tale" (1974)
- "Japan's Folk Tale Boom" (1978)
- Ancient Tales in Modern Japan: An Anthology of Japanese Folk Tales (1985)
- The Yanagita Kunio Guide to the Japanese Folk Tale (1986, editor and translator)
- "Fauna and Flora in Japanese Folktales" (1981)
- "Japanese Folk Humor" (1982)
- "The Calendar of Village Festivals: Japan" (1989)

== Personal life ==
Hagin married Emanuel Mayer. They had a daughter, Dorothy, and they divorced by 1928. Mayer lived her later years in Whittier, California, where she died in 1990, at the age of 91. She donated hundreds of volumes of Japanese-language texts to the UCLA Library.
