= Why the Sun and the Moon Live in the Sky =

1968 picture book by Elphinstone Dayrell

- Author: Elphinstone Dayrell
- Illustrator: Blair Lent
- Language: English
- Genre: Children's picture book; African Folk Tale
- Published: 1968
- Publisher: Houghton Mifflin Company
- Publication place: United States

Why The Sun and the Moon Live in the Sky is a children's picture book written by Elphinstone Dayrell and illustrated by Blair Lent retelling an African folk tale about the origin of the world and its natural elements. A version of the story has traditionally been told by coastal West African societies, the Efik-Ibibio speaking people of Nigeria among them. The book was published by Houghton Mifflin Company in 1968.

In 1969 it received the Caldecott Honor for Lent's illustrations. It has been cited as an example of a pourquoi story for young readers.
