= Jugemu =

Japanese folktale and rakugo story

Jugemu (寿限無/じゅげむ) is a famous rakugo story, a form of Japanese spoken entertainment. It has a simple story, with the most humorous part being the repetition of a ridiculously long name. It is often used in training for rakugo entertainers.

== Plot ==
Rakugo "Jugemu" performed by Tachibanaya Kakitsu II

A couple could not think of a suitable name for their newborn son. The father went to the local temple and asked the chief priest to think of an auspicious name. The priest suggested "Jugemu" (寿限無), and several other names. The father could not decide which name he preferred, and therefore, gave the baby all of the names.

Jugemu's full name is:

Jugemu Jugemu (寿限無 寿限無)
Gokō-no Surikire (五劫の擦り切れ)
Kaijarisuigyo-no (海砂利水魚の)
Suigyōmatsu Unraimatsu Fūraimatsu (水行末 雲来末 風来末)
Kuunerutokoro-ni Sumutokoro (食う寝る処に住む処)
Yaburakōji-no Burakōji (やぶら柑子のぶら柑子)
Paipopaipo Paipo-no Shūringan (パイポパイポ パイポのシューリンガン)
Shūringan-no Gūrindai (シューリンガンのグーリンダイ)
Gūrindai-no Ponpokopī-no Ponpokonā-no (グーリンダイのポンポコピーのポンポコナーの)
Chōkyūmei-no Chōsuke (長久命の長助)

(the NHK Nihongo de asobō version, partially replaced with kanji)

In one version of the tale, Jugemu got into a fight with a friend one day, and the friend suffered a large bump on his head. In protest, he went crying to Jugemu's parents. However, due to the amount of time it took to recite his name, by the time he finished, the bump on his head had already healed.

Another version states that Jugemu fell into a well and drowned; everyone who had to pass along the news spent a lot of time reciting his entire name. In yet another variant, Jugemu fell into a lake, and his parents barely arrived in time to save him.

== Interpretation of Jugemu's name ==
Each part of Jugemu's name that the priest had suggested has an auspicious meaning:

Jugemu
"limitless life".
Gokō-no Surikire
"five kō of rubbing off (the rock)". In Japanese Buddhist lore, a heavenly maiden would visit the human world once in every three thousand years, leaving friction marks on a huge rock with her dress. Eventually, the rock would wear down to nothing in the span of one kō, or 4 billion (4×10^{9}) years. The priest thus blesses the child to live at least 20 billion (2×10^{10}) years, essentially for eternity.
Kaijarisuigyo
"gravel in the sea and fish in water". The amount of gravel and number of fish in the world is meant to represent the degree of the child's luck and fortune.
Suigyōmatsu
"where water eventually goes". Because water is free to go anywhere, the child is blessed with boundless well-being wherever he goes.
Unraimatsu
"where clouds originally come". Because clouds come from anywhere, this is similar to the above.
Fūraimatsu
"where wind originally comes". Similar to the above.
Kuunerutokoro
"places to eat and sleep". It is fortunate to have both food and shelter at any time.
Sumutokoro
"places to live". Same as above.
Yaburakōji-no burakōji
"Ardisia japonica (marlberry) bushes in Yabura Trail". The plant's modern Japanese name is yabukōji, and it is considered to be imbued with energy year-round. Yabura has no inherent meaning, but is inferred to be yabukōji with the pluralizing –ra suffix.
Paipo, Shūringan, Gūrindai, Ponpokopī, Ponpokonā
These are invented names of a kingdom and royal family in Ancient China. Paipo was a rich and peaceful kingdom, where King Shūringan and Queen Gūrindai reigned. They gave birth to Princess Ponpokopī and Princess Ponpokonā, and all of them enjoyed longevity.
Chōkyūmei
"long and lasting life".
Chōsuke
"blessed for a long time".

== History ==
Japanese folklore studies classify "Jugemu" as a variant of tale type The Child with a Long Name. In the English speaking world, children's literature of this type is known by the titles "Tikki Tikki Tembo" and "Nicki Nicki Tembo".

An early version of this type is "Yoku kara shizumu fuchi" ('Sunk down the waters for greed'), in a book of jokes published in 1703, created by rakugo comedian Yonezawa Hikohachi. In it, a stepmother renames her sons. The stepson whom she hates is given a short name Nyozegamo, and her precious own son given a long Anokutarasambyakusambodai. One day, Nyozegamo falls into a river, but people swiftly rescue him. Another day, the mother's own son is swept by the river. She cries "Somebody, please! Anokutarasambyakusambodai is drowning!", but the boy is lost to the river as no-one comes to save him due to the time it takes her to say his name. Both names are garbled forms of phrases taken from Sino-Japanese readings of Chinese Buddhist sutras. The punchline is a Japanese pun involving the word sambyaku.

A book of horror stories published in 1805 contains "Isshini imyōo tsukete kōkai seshi hanashi" ('A tale of a man who named his son with a strange name, and regretted it'). In it, a man wishes to name his first son with a unique and long name. He consults a Confucian scholar, who recommends the name Daigaku shuki shouku shi teishino iwaku daigakuwa kōshino ishonishite shogaku tokuirunomon hyōe. A tutor of Japanese poetry sneers at this, opposing such use of foreign language to name a Japanese's son. The tutor proposes Nagakiyono tōnonefurino minamezame naminaminori funeno otono yoshibē, a traditional poem of good fortune. The scholar and the tutor starts quarrelling, so the father decides to make the name by himself. He solemnly declares it will be Tekitekini tekisuru onbō Sōrinbō sōtaka nyūdō Harimano bettō chawan chausuno hikigino Hyokosuke.

One day, the boy falls into a well. People panic to rescue the boy, but for every message they recite the long name. The boy dies, "blue and swollen". (Note: frame 73:「大学朱熹章句子程子曰大学孔子之遺書而初学入徳之門兵衛(だいがくしゅきしょうくしていしのいわくだいがくはこうしのいしょにしてしょがくとくいるのもんひょうえ)」様; frame 75:「ながきよのとをのねふりのみなめざめなみなみのりふねのをとのよしべい」; frame 76 (in original spelling): 敵々仁 敵須畄 御坊 蒼臨坊 惣高入道 播广之別當 茶碗茶臼之 挽木之 飛与小助 Translation: てきてきに てきする おんぼう そうりんほう そうたかにうとう はりまのべつとう ちやわんちやうすの ひききの ひよこすけ)

The name by the Confucian is taken from a translated Chinese Confucian textbook about Great Learning. The poem that the tutor referred to, in its original form nakakiyono tōnonefurino minamesame naminori funeno otono yokikana, is a palindrome of Japanese morae (similar to syllables). The story gives no explanation of the origin or meanings of "Tekitekini[...]". The book was written by a storywriter and storyteller with pen name Tozuisha.

The name "Jugemu" appears in a 1884 magazine article, (Note: Bibliographic information of the original magazine article: 経済記者 (1884-07-26). 経済学釈義 [Lecture on economics]. Tōkyō keizai zasshi (in Japanese). 10 (224). Keizai Zasshisha: 109. NCID AN00159377. (Meiji (era) 17 = 1884 CE); p109 quote: ヂゲム ヂゲム ゴコーノスーリキリ カイヂャリスイギョ スギヨバチャ カイポ カイポ カイポノシリヲ グリンダ グリンダ グリンダノチョースケガ アノヤマコエテ コノヤマコエテ コエテ コエテノ ヲポポイノポイマ: Note (not in text): The article is a lecture on economics. The author cites "that story of naming a child 'Jigemujigemu...'" as a metaphor to ridicule his opponent's theory. No source is mentioned.) and the full story in a 1912 book. Another 1912 document suggests that the rakugo story of "Jugemu" may have existed by the mid-19th century.

According to a memoire published in 1927, there was another rakugo performed around the 1880s. (Note: pp71-102: Full text of Noguchi's travelogue.; p72: Noguchi leaves Kobe, Japan, on September 9, 1888, heading India.; pp95-96: Episode of the long-name tale.; p95: At Madras, Noguchi attends an international conference. For his turn of after-dinner speech, he chooses a tale he heard before at a yose (rakugo theater) in Kyoto.; p96: The original punchline is: "The father calls out his son's name. A voice is heard down from the well, bubbling 'a-dabu-dabu-dabu'." But this punchline requires knowledge of how Buddhist chants are used in Japan. So, to suit the international audience, Noguchi changed the finale to "But it was too late!"; Note (not in the article): This article indicates the original rakugo performance in Kyoto existed before 1888.) In it, the first child is named by a Shinto priest, but dies in infancy; the parents ask a Buddhist priest to name their second child. The name is Animanimanimamane shiresharite shyamiyashyai taisentemokutemokute aishabisoishabi shaeashae shamiyaarokyabashabishyani abendaranebite atandahareshite ukuremukure arareharare shugyashiasanmasanbi budabikkiridjitchi darumaharishude sogyanekushane bashabashashudaimandarā, (Note: This book has no book-wide pagination. The travelogue's local pagination range is pp1–88.; p4: Noguchi leaves Kobe, Japan, on September 9, 1888, heading India.; pp68–70: Episode of the long-name tale.; p69 (corrected version of the child's name): アニマニマニママネ、シレシヤリテ、シヤミヤシヤイ、タイセンテモクテモクテ、アイシヤビソイシヤビ、シヤエアシヤエ、シヤミヤアロキヤバシヤビシヤニ、アベンダラネビテ、アタンダハレシテ、ウクレムクレ、アラレハラレ、シユギヤシアサンマサンビ、ブダビツキリヂツチ、ダルマハリシユデ、ソギヤネクシヤネ、バシヤバシヤシユダイマンダラー) taken from a dharani (Buddhist chant) in chapter 26 of the Lotus Sutra. One day the child falls into a well and drowns; the punchline is dark humor relating Buddhist chants to Japanese funerals. This version is titled "Nagana (長名)". By the mid-20th century, it was no longer performed.

"Jugemu" is performed not only in yose (rakugo theaters), but also to other audiences and on mass media, especially for children.

"Jugemu" was on a 1926 newspaper's radio broadcast program, with the full name printed. There was another broadcast in 1932, this time for children, and the name printed on newspaper again. The story is told in children's magazines from as early as 1926. Even a prominent Japanese dictionary Kōjien describes the full name, since its 1991 edition. Television stations broadcast it also in children's programs. In 2003, NHK children's TV program Nihongo de Asobō ("Let's play with Japanese language") featured a game of reciting the name from memory. The program proved popular. There were schools that make all pupils memorize and recite it.

Since 2005, several elementary school textbooks include "Jugemu".

== Cultural references ==
The Super Mario Bros. video game series includes a cloud-riding turtle-dropping enemy character called Lakitu in English, and called 'Jugemu' in Japanese. The eggs Lakitu drop, which turn into Spinies, are referred to as 'Paipo', another of Jugemu's many names. Lakitu was in the original SMB, and Super Mario Bros. 3 added a new enemy called Spike. The spiked balls thrown by them are called shūringan in another reference. Additionally, Paper Mario includes two Lakitus by the name of Lakilester and Lakilulu in English, but are named 'Pokopī' and 'Pokona' in Japanese.

Jugemu's full name is quoted in the song "Jousha Hissui No Kotowari, Okotowari" (盛者必衰の理、お断り) by Japanese rock band KANA-BOON.

Jugemu (#40) is a colossal underground monster appearing to be only a tiny twig with a single leaf on the surface in the video game Star Ocean: Blue Sphere.

"Jugemu-jugemu gokōnosurikire sammy-davis broilerchicken" is the chant Sasami uses to turn into Pretty Sammy in the Japanese anime Magical Girl Pretty Sammy.

In a short included as a DVD extra for the Fullmetal Alchemist: Brotherhood anime series, the character known only by the mononym "Scar" reveals he shares his name with Jugemu; the character King Bradley (who is known to have adopted the name Bradley, originally bearing only the moniker "Wrath") then reveals that it happens to be his real name as well (though Bradley's voice actor repeatedly misses the third "Paipo"). They continue saying it while preparing for battle, until Scar, in reciting the name, accidentally bites his tongue.

Gintama's second season features two episodes centered on a small monkey whose full name starts with "Jugem Jugem" and takes almost 30 seconds to recite. The short title of the episode introducing the monkey, "Jugem", contrasts with the usually much longer titles of Gintama episodes.

Jugemu's full name is recited in the lyrics of "Nippon Egao Hyakkei", the ending theme to Joshiraku, a manga and anime about a troupe of female rakugo performers.

Lucy from Servant × Service also shares the similar fate as Jugemu (having a long name with a similar origin) and when she first reveals her name her co-workers remark that she is a "modern day Jugemu Jugemu".

In the 2016 game Phoenix Wright: Ace Attorney - Spirit of Justice, case 4 ("Turnabout Storyteller") contains multiple references to different rakugo, including Jugemu. At the beginning of the trial, the prosecutor Nahyuta Sahdmadhi is questioned about his knowledge on rakugo, and in response offers to read Jugemu, and begins the story, before being cut off by Athena Cykes in order to return focus to the trial at hand. In the original Japanese version, he instead recites the full name of Jugemu. A character appearing in the case, Geiru Toneido, also has a dog called Jugemu, named after the story.

Jugemu's name is featured prominently in an episode of Shōwa Genroku Rakugo Shinjū. Two of the main characters perform it for a kindergarten their son attends.

In Hatsune Miku: Project DIVA Arcade, Miku Flick/02, and Hatsune Miku: Project DIVA Future Tone, a Vocaloid producer named "Vocaliod-P" made a song named "Jugemu Sequencer" which was inspired by Jugemu. This song has reached the Hall of Fame.

In episode 21 of Kamen Rider Fourze, the rakugo club can be heard practicing Jugemu when JK and Ryusei come to speak to one of the members.

In episode 33 of Tropical-Rouge! Pretty Cure, the five main characters come up with new attack names. Instead of choosing one, they combine them all into a really long attack name with several words from Jugemu's full name being a part of it.

In Overlord, many members of the Goblin Troop are named after Jugemu Jugemu, such as "Gokou", "Unlai", and "Yaburo".

In the manga series Akane-banashi, the protagonist Akane, a trainee Rakugo performer, is challenged to win a Rakugo competition by performing the Jugemu story. In Episode 10 of the anime adaptation, Akane masterfully performs Jugemu, including the meaning of each part of the name. Near the end of the episode is a brief explanation of how different rakugo schools pass down slight variations of Jugemu's full name.

In Episode 8 of the anime Tamon's B-Side, after Utage sees Tamon, she freaks out and reacts by performing the Jugemu story.

In episode 5 of Smoking Behind the Supermarket with You, during the supermarket scene Yamada surprises Sasaki and subsequently causes him to drop his shopping basket and its contents on the floor, the first two lines "Jugemu Jugemu Gokō-no Surikire" are said by Sasaki, presumably in his head, as he is handed one of the items he dropped.

== See also ==
- Japanese folktale
- John Jacob Jingleheimer Schmidt, an American children's song where the humour similarly derives from a comically long name being repeated
- Non-fictional persons with long Jugemu-esque names:
  - Mary Kawena Pukui, a Hawaiian scholar, author, composer, hula expert and educator
  - Hubert Blaine Wolfeschlegelsteinhausenbergerdorff Sr., American typesetter who held the record for the longest personal name ever used
  - Leone Sextus Tollemache, British Army captain in World War I
  - Alfonso de Borbón y Borbón, Spanish nobleman with 88 forenames
