= Chrysanthemum (book) =

1991 children's book by Kevin Henkes

- Paperback cover
- Author: Kevin Henkes
- Illustrator: Kevin Henkes
- Cover artist: Kevin Henkes
- Language: English
- Series: Mouse Books
- Genre: Picture book
- Publisher: Greenwillow Books
- Publication date: September 16, 1991
- Publication place: United States
- ISBN: 0-688-09699-9
- Preceded by: Julius, the Baby of the World
- Followed by: Owen

Chrysanthemum is a 1991 children's picture book by American writer and illustrator Kevin Henkes.

The book was chosen as an ALA Notable Book and the School Library Journal Best Book of the Year, and it is on the Horn Book Fanfare Honor List. Based on a 2007 online poll, the National Education Association listed the book as one of its "Teachers' Top 100 Books for Children". It was one of the "Top 100 Picture Books" of all time in a 2012 poll by School Library Journal.

== Plot ==
Chrysanthemum is a young mouse who loves her unique name and thinks it is absolutely perfect, until she is teased about it by her classmates. Her main tormentors are three other girl mice named Jo, Rita, and Victoria, who ridicule her for being named after a flower and point out that her name is so long that it barely fits on a name tag. Chrysanthemum expresses her sadness to her parents, who comfort her with her favorite foods and a game of Parcheesi while her father secretly reads books on child psychology.

One night, Chrysanthemum has a nightmare; she sprouts the petals of the flower after which she is named, and Victoria picks them off one by one. However, the following day, her class meets their music teacher, Mrs. Twinkle, who is expecting a baby, and helps them with an upcoming musical. Chrysanthemum is assigned to be a daisy, which results in her being teased once again by Jo, Rita, and Victoria. However, Mrs. Twinkle points out to them that her own first name, Delphinium, is likewise long, barely fits on a name tag, and is also a flower. Mrs. Twinkle then says that if her baby is a girl, she is considering the name "Chrysanthemum" since she thinks it is absolutely perfect. Jo, Rita, and Victoria then admire Chrysanthemum's name (and give themselves flower nicknames), and Chrysanthemum’s confidence in her name is restored. Later, Mrs. Twinkle gives birth to a daughter, whom she names Chrysanthemum.

== Reception ==
Kirkus Reviews called Chrysanthemum a "winner" and said that "Henkes's language and humor are impeccably fresh, his cozy illustrations sensitive and funny, his little asides to adults an unobtrusive delight".

The Horn Book Magazine named Chrysanthemum one of the best books of 1991.

In 1991, the book won the Council of Wisconsin Writers Children’s Book Award.

== Adaptions ==
In 1998, Weston Woods developed an animated story based on the book's illustrations, which was narrated by Meryl Streep. The film was included on the ALA Notable Children's Videos list in 1999.

== In popular culture ==
The book was featured in an episode of Kino's Storytime, read by Paula Poundstone and Kim Karnsrithong.
