= Dallas Children's Theater =

Theater organization in Dallas, Texas

Dallas Children's Theater (DCT) is a professional theater organization based in Dallas, Texas, that focuses on producing theater for youth and families. It reaches an audience of 250,000 youth annually with its nine main stage productions, national touring company, and education programs. In 2004 Time magazine named it one of the top five theaters in the country performing for youth.

== Description ==
Robyn Flatt and Dennis Vincent founded DCT, a 501(c)(3) organization, in 1984. Since its opening, it has become the largest not-for-profit family theater in the Southwest, operating on an annual budget of more than $3 million. Its 11 annual productions are staged in the Rosewood Center for Family Arts. The Rosewood Center also houses its youth programming, including its theater academy and education programs such as Curtains Up on Reading.

DCT's staff works to increase the body of theater for youth. Its artistic staff has written, adapted, and/or staged more than 40 world premier plays and musicals since its opening in 1984. As of April 8, 2018 Dallas Children's Theater has presented 76 world premiers, performed 212 distinct tiles, 356 individual productions, 12,944 performances for 4,866,327 people. Notable productions include Yana Wana's Legend of the Bluebonnet, Teen Brain: The Musical, EAT (It's Not About Food), Treasure Island: Reimagined!, and Mariachi Girl. (All titles listed in "Production history" below.) In addition to new works, its repertoire also includes well-known literary works, histories, biographies, fables, and other familiar stories.

DCT has been recognized by both Time and American Theatre magazines as one of the leading professional theaters in the United States. DCT is affiliated with the Actors' Equity Association, the Theatre Communications Group, ASSITEJ International (Theater for Young Audiences/USA), and the American Alliance for Theatre and Education (AATE).

DCT offers educational and enrichment programs for children and teens in the Dallas Community. Programs include an annual national touring production that visits more than 50 cities every year; a student matinee performance series that allows underprivileged children and school programs to attend theater performances at a reduced rate; an arts-in-education program entitled "Curtains Up on Reading"; academy classes for kids and teens; after school programs; and programs created for teens.

DCT provides productions for youth and families, year-round education and outreach programs, and a national touring company that travels to over 52 cities and 26 states each year.

== Executive Artistic Director Robyn Flatt ==
Robyn Flatt has served as the executive artistic director of DCT since she co-founded the organization in 1984. In November 2008, she established the Baker Idea Institute, which holds annual symposia to address creativity and artistic expression in education.

Flatt earned a Master of Fine Arts degree from Baylor University. She served as a member of the Resident Professional Company of the Dallas Theater Center for twenty years before founding DCT.

Flatt has served on the boards of the American Alliance for Theatre and Education and the US branch of the International Association of Theatre for Children and Young People (ASSITEJ/USA). She has received many honors and awards, including induction into the College of Fellows of the American Theatre in 2007.

== DCT programs ==
DCT's Production Season offers plays (9 this season) for family audiences on an array of topics and themes, from favorite stories as Disney's Beauty and the Beast and Schoolhouse Rock Live! to work based on time-honored children's literature such as The Lion, the Witch and the Wardrobe. DCT opens the holiday with the favorite The Very Hungry Caterpillar Christmas Show and the charming classic Little Women. DCT offers musicals, dramas, puppet theater and everything in between to delight audiences of all ages. DCT also presents plays featuring issues of particular relevance to teens and their families, and reaches out again to the youngest audiences with Balloonacy.

DCT on Tour travels throughout North America presenting the professional company to over 100,000 students and families in 60 cities coast-to-coast. The tour went international in 2006 when they represented the U.S. at the International Children's Arts Expo in Shanghai, China and in 2014-2015 when they had four stops in Ontario, Canada. OCT On Tour has played the JFK Center for the Performing Arts in Washington, DC and the Luther Burbank Center for the Arts in Santa Rsa, CA The tour has reached many underserved children in rural and hard-to-reach places, such as Joplin, MO; Topeka, KS; Waco, TX; Klamath Falls, OR; Everett, WA and Anchorage, AK, to name but a few. Its first touring production premiered in 1996. Popular touring productions include Mufaro's Beautiful Daughters, Diary of a Worm, A Spider & a Fly, and Flat Stanley. In 2009, Mufaro's Beautiful Daughters was designated as an NEA (National Endowment for the Arts) American Masterpieces Touring Artist for that year.

DCT's Student Matinee Performance Series annually reaches 50,000 students and teachers with weekday performances of DCT mainstage productions. While tickets are regularly anywhere from $15 to $30 each, schools pay no more than $9.50. Free online study guides help teachers to link students' theater experience with curriculum-related activities. DCT provides free and deeply discounted tickets to low-income "at-risk" children and families and to Title I schools. This year, DCT will also present matinee performances of Diary of a Worm, a Spider & a Fly at Moody Performance Hall. For the third year in partnership with DISD Fine Arts, the program has included 35 performances designed to ensure all 14,000 second graders are guaranteed a live theater experience at DCT.

The DCT Academy for Theater Arts offers year-round classes to over 2,000 young people, ages 3 1 /2 to 18. The spring and fall sessions last 11 weeks, with 350 students in 20 classes per session each. Classes include beginning to advanced theater arts and are taught by theater professionals with a focus on the development of imagination, communication skills, collaborative problem solving and performance techniques. Showbiz Summer offers over 50 classes. The Teen Conservatory offers exciting opportunities for older students. Scholarships are available.

Curtains Up on Reading is an in-school residency that integrates drama, literature, language arts, social studies and history. DCT artists collaborate with teachers in DISD elementary schools (up to 2,000 students) to incorporate drama into the core curriculum. Interdisciplinary units are designed and taught using a hands-on approach to enhancing students' understanding of the material, build enthusiasm for learning, and develop self-confidence. This is particularly effective in working with low-performing youth impeded by language barriers and learning difficulties. History comes alive through characterization and students' role development.

Curtains Up on Literacy is a partnership with Literacy Achieves (formerly VMLC-Vickery, West and Elm) that links adult literacy and pre-K children's classes with creative drama and professional theater performances in a free, cross-generational program for 30 to 40 families.

== Kathy Burks Theater of Puppetry Arts ==
Founded in 1973, the Kathy Burks Theater of Puppetry Arts has been affiliated with DCT since 1996. It uses all styles of puppetry, including traditional bridge and cabaret marionettes, hand puppets, shadow puppets, and Black Theater rod puppets. Kathy Burks' puppets are often featured in other DCT mainstage productions.

The Kathy Burks Theater of Puppetry Arts stores its collection of over 1,000 puppets, both new and antique, at DCT's Rosewood Center for Family Arts.

== Venues ==
DCT productions began running at El Centro Community College in 1984, and continued to do so continuously until 2003. In 1987, with the support of The Rosewood Corporation and the Meadows Foundation, they moved their administrative offices and some performances to the Crescent Theater in Dallas.

In 2003 DCT moved from the Crescent Theater into the 58,000 sq. ft. Rosewood Center for Family Arts with the Baker Theater (seats 400) and Studio Theater (seats 150), five classrooms, community gathering room and space for costume, scenic, shops and storage.

== Production history ==
1984-1985

- Babes in Toyland, directed by Dennis W. Vincent and John R. Stevens
- A Wrinkle in Time, directed by Robyn Flatt
- The Hobbit, directed by Lee Lowrimore
- Pinocchio, directed by Dennis W. Vincent
- The Play Called Noah's Flood, directed by Karl Schaeffer

1985-1986

- Treasure Island, directed by Joe Calk
- The Wizard of Oz, directed by John R. Stevens
- The Legend of the Bluebonnet & the Ice Wolf, directed by Robyn Flatt
- The Long Winter, directed by Dennis W. Vincent
- Raggedy Ann and Andy, directed by John R. Stevens
- The Revenge of the Space Pandas, directed by Karl Schaeffer

1986-1987

- The Outlaw Robin Hood, directed by Karl Schaeffer
- The Best Christmas Pageant Ever, directed by Robyn Flatt
- Most Valuable Player, directed by Cecilia Flores (Southwest Premiere)
- A Wind in the Door, directed by Dennis W. Vincent
- Peter Pan, directed by John R. Stevens
- James and the Giant Peach, directed by Robyn Flatt

1987-1988

- The Miracle Worker, directed by Robyn Flatt
- Kegger, directed by John R. Stevens
- Doors, directed by Jenna Worthen
- The Best Christmas Pageant Ever, directed by Robyn Flatt
- The Velveteen Rabbit & The Wild Things, directed by Dennis W. Vincent & Nancy Schaeffer
- The Secret Garden, directed by Robyn Flatt & Artie Olaisen
- Tom Sawyer, directed by John R. Stevens
- Charlie and the Chocolate Factory, directed by Dennis W. Vincent

1988-1989

- Kabuki Sleeping Beauty, directed by Rick Ney
- The Woods at Bear Bottom, directed by Paul Baker (world premiere)
- The Best Christmas Pageant Ever, directed by Dennis W. Vincent
- Merry Christmas, Strega Nona, directed by John R. Stevens
- To Kill a Mockingbird, directed by Robyn Flatt
- Tales of a Fourth Grade Nothing, directed by Dennis W. Vincent
- Prodigy, directed by Artie Olaisen
- Cinderella, or Everybody Needs a Fairy Godmother, directed by Dennis W. Vincent & Linda Daugherty (world premiere)
- The Ransom of Red Chief, directed by Karl Schaeffer
- The Lion, the Witch and the Wardrobe, directed by Robyn Flatt & Mark Gruber

1989-1990

- Babar, directed by Dennis W. Vincent
- The Diary of Anne Frank, directed by Robyn Flatt
- Christmas Dreams, directed by John R. Stevens
- The Snow Queen, directed by Artie Olaisen
- Dragon, directed by Yuli Gusman (American Premiere)
- Ghosts of Japan, directed by Rick Ney
- The Odyssey, directed by Artie Olaisen
- The Phantom Tollbooth, directed by Elly Lindsay
- Winnie the Pooh, directed by Jerry Ayers
- Sherlock Holmes and the Baker Street Irregulars, directed by Robyn Flatt

1990-1991

- Snow White, directed by Robyn Flatt
- Frankenstein, directed by Artie Olaisen
- The Best Christmas Pageant Ever, directed by Nancy Schaeffer
- Santa's Alive and Well and Momma's Got Him in the Kitchen, directed by Dennis W. Vincent (world premiere)
- The Frog Princess & Peter and the Wolf, directed by Dennis W. Vincent & Nancy Schaeffer
- Sisters, directed by Cecilia Flores
- African Tales of Ananse the Spider Man, directed by Robyn Flatt (world premiere)
- Charlotte's Web, directed by Beverly Renquist
- Whale, directed by Robyn Flatt (associate: Karl Schaeffer)
- The Magician's Nephew, directed by Elly Lindsay
- Treasure Island, directed by Artie Olaisen

1991-1992

- The Little Mermaid, directed by Dennis W. Vincent (world premiere)
- Dracula, the Vampire Play, directed by Artie Olaisen
- The Best Christmas Pageant Ever, directed by Nancy Schaeffer
- The Daughter of St. Nicholas, directed by Robyn Flatt
- Jungal Book, directed by Artie Olaisen
- Most Valuable Player, directed by Cecilia Flores
- Maggie Magalita, directed by Elly Lindsay (Southwest Premiere)
- The Reluctant Dragon, directed by Robyn Flatt
- A Tale of Twelfth Night, directed by Paul Munger
- Pinocchio 2142: A Space Adventure, directed by Dennis W. Vincent (world premiere)
- The Adventures of Oliver Twist, directed by Robyn Flatt

1992-1993

- Beauty and the Beast, directed by Steve Peterson
- The Canterville Ghost, directed by Artie Olaisen
- The Best Christmas Pageant Ever, directed by Nancy Schaeffer
- Come Into the Light, directed by Dennis W. Vincent (world premiere)
- Anne of Green Gables, directed by Robyn Flatt
- Ananse's Tales of Africa, directed by Rob Hubbard
- Dinosaurs, directed by Sally Fiorello
- A Wrinkle in Time, directed by Artie Olaisen
- Fiesta Mexicana: Tales from the Land of the Feathered Serpent, directed by Dolores Godinez
- Aladdin and the Wonderful Lamp, directed by Artie Olaisen
- The Island of the Skog, directed by Robyn Flatt (world premiere)

1993-1994

- Ramona Quimby, directed by Elly Lindsay
- The Curse of Castle Mongrew, directed by Artie Olaisen
- The Best Christmas Pageant Ever, directed by Nancy Schaeffer
- Kringle's Window, directed by Dennis W. Vincent & Brent Hasty
- The Prince and the Pauper, directed by Robyn Flatt
- Apollo: To the Moon, directed by Cecilia Flores & Karl Schaeffer
- Bridge to Terabithia, directed by Robyn Flatt
- The Secret Garden, directed by Artie Olaisen
- Make Me Pele for a Day, directed by Clay Houston
- The Wizard of Oz, directed by Nancy Schaeffer
- Sleeping Beauty: The Hundred Year Adventure, directed by Dennis W. Vincent (world premiere)

1994-1995

- Charlotte's Web, directed by Andre du Broc
- The Mummy's Claw, directed by Artie Olaisen
- Just in the Nick of Time, directed by Andre du Broc (world premiere)
- The Best Christmas Pageant Ever, directed by Nancy Schaeffer
- A Woman Called Truth, directed by Ptosha Storey (Southwest Premiere)
- Beauty and the Beast, directed by David Fisher
- The Rememberer, directed by Robyn Flatt (Southwest Premiere)
- The Lion, the Witch and the Wardrobe, directed by Artie Olaisen
- If You Give a Mouse a Cookie, directed by Dennis W. Vincent
- Sherlock Holmes and the Baker Street Irregulars, directed by Robyn Flatt
- Cinderella or Everybody Needs a Fairy Godmother, directed by Nancy Schaeffer

1995-1996

- Winnie the Pooh, directed by Trudy Wheeler
- Little Women, directed by Pamela Sterling
- Come into the Light, directed by John Hanby
- The Christmas Witch, directed by Robyn Flatt (world premiere)
- Lyle Lyle Crocodile, directed by Nancy Schaeffer
- A Woman Called Truth, directed by Ptosha Storey
- Star Path Moon Stop, directed by Robyn Flatt (world premiere)
- Little Women, directed by Andrew Gaupp & Pamela Sterling
- Tuck Everlasting, directed by Artie Olaisen
- Jack and the Giant Bean Stalk, directed by Nancy Schaeffer (world premiere)
- Snow White, directed by Artie Olaisen

1996-1997

- Cinderella or Everybody Needs a Fairy Godmother, directed by Cheryl Denson
- The Boy Who Drew Cats and Other Tales, directed by Danny Tamez
- Frankenstein, directed by Artie Olaisen
- The Nutcracker, Kathy Burks Theater of Puppetry Arts
- The Best Christmas Pageant Ever, directed by Nancy Schaeffer
- Dinosaur, directed by Pam Myers-Morgan
- To Kill a Mockingbird, directed by Robyn Flatt
- The Yellow Boat, directed by Andrew Gaupp
- Pecos Bill, directed by Nancy Schaeffer (world premiere)
- A Little Princess, directed by Artie Olaisen
- Peter Pan, directed by Robyn Flatt
- Rumplestilskin, directed by Artie Olaisen (world premiere)

1997-1998

- Jack and the Giant Beanstalk, directed by Nancy Schaeffer
- Charlie and the Chocolate Factory, directed by Andy Long
- The Hound of the Baskervilles, directed by Artie Olaisen
- Not a Creature was Stirring, Kathy Burks Theater of Puppetry Arts
- The Christmas Witch, directed by Robyn Flatt (world premiere)
- A Glory Over Everything, directed by Ptosha Storey
- Bunnicula, directed by Nancy Schaeffer
- The Miracle Worker, directed by Robyn Flatt
- Young King Arthur, directed by Artie Olaisen (world premiere)
- The Emperor's New Clothes, directed by Artie Olaisen
- The Island of the Skog, directed by Robyn Flatt (world premiere)

1998-1999

- The Island of the Skog, directed by Robyn Flatt (national tour)
- Babe, the Sheep Pig, directed by Nancy Schaeffer (US Premiere)
- Dracula, the Vampire Play, directed by Artie Olaisen
- The Nutcracker, Kathy Burks Theater of Puppetry Arts
- The Best Christmas Pageant Ever, directed by Nancy Schaeffer
- Most Valuable Player, directed by Guinea Lada Bennett
- The Princess and the Pea, directed by Robyn Flatt & Andy Long
- Shakespeare Out of Pocket, directed by Tony Medlin
- Adventures of Huckleberry Finn, directed by Robyn Flatt
- Heidi, directed by Andrew Gaupp (world premiere)
- You're a Good Man, Charlie Brown, directed by Peppy Biddy
- The Hobbit, directed by Artie Olaisen

1999-2000

- Young King Arthur, directed by Sally Fiorello & Douglass Burks (national tour)
- Miss Nelson is Missing, directed by Nancy Schaeffer
- The Canterville Ghost, directed by Artie Olaisen
- The Nutcracker, Kathy Burks Theater of Puppetry Arts
- Miracle on 34th Street, directed by Robyn Flatt
- If You Give a Moose a Muffin, directed by Nancy Schaeffer
- Roll of Thunder, Hear My Cry, directed by Guinea Lada Bennett
- Island of the Blue Dolphins, directed by Robyn Flatt
- Charlotte's Web, directed by Andy Long
- Bless Cricket, Crest Toothpaste, and Tommy Tune, directed by Robyn Flatt (Southwest Premiere)
- The Surprising Story of the Three Little Pigs, directed by Nancy Schaeffer (world premiere)

2000-2001

- Heidi, directed by Kathy Byrne (national tour)
- The Boxcar Children, directed by Nancy Schaeffer
- The Mummy's Claw, directed by Artie Olaisen
- The Best Christmas Pageant Ever, directed by Nancy Schaeffer
- Not a Creature was Stirring, Kathy Burks Theater for Puppetry Arts
- The Three Sillies, directed by Robyn Flatt (world premiere)
- My Lord What a Morning, directed by Artie Olaisen
- The Great Gilly Hopkins, directed by Robyn Flatt
- Tom Sawyer, directed by Andrew Gaupp
- The BFG-Big Friendly Giant, directed by Artie Olaisen
- African Tales of Earth and Sky, directed by Robyn Flatt (world premiere)

2001-2002

- The Three Sillies, directed by Andy Long (national tour)
- Honk!, directed by Nancy Schaeffer
- Gatherings in Graveyards, directed by Artie Olaisen
- Hans Brinker or the Silver Skates, directed by Cheryl Denson (world premiere)
- African Tales of Earth and Sky, directed by Robyn Flatt
- Sideways Stories from Wayside School, directed by Nancy Schaeffer
- Deadly Weapons, directed by Graham Whitehead
- Lilly's Purple Plastic Purse, directed by Nancy Schaeffer
- And Then They Came for Me, directed by Robyn Flatt
- Alexander and the Terrible, Horrible, No Good, Very Bad Day, directed by Peppy Biddu

2002-2003

- African Tales of Earth and Sky, directed by Robyn Flatt (national tour)
- Amelia Bedelia, directed by Andy Long
- Grimm Tales, directed by Artie Olaisen
- The Nutcracker, Kathy Burks Theater of Puppetry Arts
- The Best Christmas Pageant Ever, directed by Nancy Schaeffer
- Miss Nelson is Back!, directed by Nancy Schaeffer
- Holes, directed by Artie Olaisen
- Johnny Tremain, directed by Robyn Flatt
- Alexander and the Terrible, Horrible, No Good, Very Bad Day, directed by Peppy Biddy
- Coyote Tales, directed by Robyn Flatt (world premiere)
- The Jungal Book, directed by Artie Olaisen

2003-2004

- And Then They Came for Me, directed by Robyn Flatt (national tour)
- The Island of the Skog, directed by Nancy Schaeffer
- Hoot Owl Hootenanny, Kathy Burks Theater for Puppetry Arts, directed by Doug Burks
- Frankenstein, directed by Artie Olaisen
- Not a Creature was Stirring, Kathy Burks Theater for Puppetry Arts
- Hans Brinker or the Silver Skates, directed by Cheryl Denson
- The Stinky Cheese Man and Other Fair(l)y (Stoopid) Tales, directed by Nancy Schaeffer
- The Outsiders, directed by Robyn Flatt
- The Lion, the Witch, and the Wardrobe, directed by Artie Olaisen
- Sarah Plain and Tall, directed by Robyn Flatt
- Go, Dog, Go!, directed by Nancy Schaeffer
- Treasure Island, directed by Artie Olaisen

2004-2005

- To Kill a Mockingbird, directed by Robyn Flatt
- Rumplestilskin, Kathy Burks Theater for Puppetry Arts
- The Velveteen Rabbit, directed by Robyn Flatt (world premiere)
- The Best Christmas Pageant Ever, directed by Nancy Schaeffer
- If You Give a Mouse a Cookie, directed by Nancy Schaeffer
- A Midnight Cry, directed by Sally Fiorello
- The Frog Prince, Kathy Burks Theater for Puppetry Arts
- The Magician's Nephew, directed by Artie Olaisen
- The Wrestling Season, directed by Rene Moreno
- Coyote Tales, directed by Andy Long (national tour)
- Stuart Little, directed by Nancy Schaeffer

2005-2006

- Charlotte's Web, directed by Robyn Flatt
- Everyday Heroes, directed by Andy Long
- The Nutcracker, Kathy Burks Theater for Puppetry Arts
- A Laura Ingalls Wilder Christmas, directed by Robyn Flatt
- Junie B. Jones & a Little Monkey Business, directed by Nancy Schaeffer
- Ananse the Spider Man, directed by Robyn Flatt
- Winnie the Pooh, Kathy Burks Theater for Puppetry Arts
- The Secret Garden, directed by Artie Olaisen
- The Music Lesson, directed by J. Daniel Herring
- The Stinky Cheese Man and Other Fair(l)y (Stoopid) Tales, directed by Nancy Schaeffer (national tour)
- The Emperor's New Clothes, directed by Artie Olaisen
- When I was a Child, directed by Ted Perry

2006-2007

- If You Give a Pig a Party, directed by Nancy Schaeffer (world premiere)
- Night of the Living Dead, directed by Artie Olaisen
- The Velveteen Rabbit, directed by Robyn Flatt
- The Best Christmas Pageant Ever, directed by Nancy Schaeffer
- The Miracle Worker, directed by Robyn Flatt
- Carnival of the Animals, Kathy Burks Theater for Puppetry Arts
- Sleeping Beauty, directed by Andy Long
- James and the Giant Peach, directed by Robyn Flatt
- The Secret Life of Girls, directed by Nancy Schaeffer (world premiere)
- A Midnight Cry, directed by Sally Fiorello (national tour)
- Pinkerton!!!, directed by Robyn Flatt (world premiere)

2007-2008

- Tales of a Fourth Grade Nothing, directed by Matt Lyle
- Night of the Living Dead, directed by Artie Olaisen
- The Nutcracker, Kathy Burks Theater for Puppetry Arts
- A Little House Christmas, directed by Robyn Flatt
- Goodnight Moon, directed by Nancy Schaeffer
- Mufaro's Beautiful Daughters, directed by Robyn Flatt
- House at Pooh Corner, Kathy Burks Theater for Puppetry Arts, directed by Doug Burks
- The Giver, directed by Artie Olaisen
- Eat: It's Not About the Food, directed by Nancy Schaeffer (world premiere)
- If You Give a Pig a Party, directed by Nancy Schaeffer (national tour)
- A Year with Frog and Toad, directed by Cheryl Denson

2008-2009

- Lilly's Purple Plastic Purse, directed by Nancy Schaeffer
- The Mummy's Claw, directed by Artie Olaisen
- Madeline's Christmas, directed by Nancy Schaeffer
- Santa's Holiday for Strings, Kathy Burks Theater for Puppetry Arts, directed by Doug Burks & Sally Fiorello
- Mufaro's Beautiful Daughters, directed by Robyn Flatt (national tour)
- Click Clack Moo: Cows that Type, directed by Doug Miller
- Honus and Me, directed by Andy Long
- The Tale of Peter Rabbit, Kathy Burks Theater for Puppetry Arts
- don't u luv me?, directed by Nancy Schaeffer (world premiere)
- And Then They Came for Me, directed by Robyn Flatt
- The Neverending Story, directed by Artie Olaisen

2009-2010

- Junie B. Jones & a Little Monkey Business, directed by Nancy Schaeffer
- The Best Christmas Pageant Ever, directed by Nancy Schaeffer
- Santa's Holiday for Strings, Kathy Burks Theater of Puppetry Arts
- How I Became a Pirate, directed by Nancy Schaeffer (Regional Premiere)
- Hansel and Gretel, Kathy Burks Theater of Puppetry Arts
- The Lion, the Witch, and the Wardrobe, directed by Artie Olaisen
- hard 2 spel dad, directed by Robyn Flatt (world premiere)
- Carnival of the Animals, Kathy Burks Theater of Puppetry Arts
- Most Valuable Player, directed by Andy Long
- Giggle, Giggle, Quack, directed by Doug Miller (Regional Premiere)

2010-2011

- Giggle, Giggle, Quack, directed by Doug Miller (national tour)
- Miss Nelson is Missing!, directed by Nancy Schaeffer
- The Curse of Castle Mongrew, directed by Artie Olaisen
- Junie B. in Jingle Bells, Batman Smells!, directed by Nancy Schaeffer (Regional Premiere)
- The Snow Queen, Kathy Burks Theater of Puppetry Arts (world premiere)
- The True Story of the Three Little Pigs!, directed by Cheryl Denson (Regional Premiere)
- Teen Scene Festival: dont u luv me? (professional production), hard 2 spel dad (professional production), EAT: It's Not About Food (students), The Secret Life of Girls (students)
- The Frog Prince, Kathy Burks Theater of Puppetry Arts
- Tuck Everlasting, directed by Artie Olaisen
- Senora Tortuga, directed by Robyn Flatt and Roxanne Schroeder-Arce
- The Pied Piper's Magic, directed by Robyn Flatt (world premiere)

2011-2012

- Alexander and the Terrible, Horrible, No Good, Very Bad Day, directed by Doug Miller
- Madeline's Christmas, directed by Nancy Schaeffer
- The Nutcracker, Kathy Burks Theater of Puppetry Arts
- If You Give a Mouse a Cookie, directed by Nancy Schaeffer
- The Secret Life of Girls, directed by Nancy Schaeffer
- Young King Arthur, Kathy Burks Theater of Puppetry Arts
- Anne of Green Gables, directed by Robyn Flatt
- Diary of a Worm, a Spider and a Fly, directed by Bob Hess (Regional Professional Premiere)
- Mufaro's Beautiful Daughters, directed by Robyn Flatt (national tour)

2012-2013

- Pinkalicious: The Musical, directed by Nancy Schaeffer
- The Nutcracker, Kathy Burks Theater of Puppetry Arts
- Junie B. in Jingle Bells, Batman Smells, directed by Nancy Schaeffer
- Goodnight Moon, directed by Nancy Schaeffer
- Rumpelstiltskin, Kathy Burks Theater of Puppetry Arts
- A Wrinkle in Time, directed by Artie Olaisen
- The Musical Adventures of Flat Stanley, directed by Michael Serrecchia
- The True Story of the 3 Little Pigs!, directed by Doug Miller

2013-2014

- Dr. Seuss's The Cat in the Hat, directed by Nancy Schaeffer
- Ghouls & Graveyards, directed by Artie Olaisen & Karl Schaeffer
- Twas the Night Before Christmas, directed by Robyn Flatt & Doug Miller
- The Nutcracker, Kathy Burks Theater of Puppetry Arts
- Go, Dog. Go!, directed by Nancy Schaeffer
- Little Women, directed by Nancy Schaeffer, Teen Scene
- Beauty and the Beast, Kathy Burks Theater of Puppetry Arts
- Mariachi Girl, directed by Robyn Flatt & David Lozano
- Charlotte's Web, directed by Artie Olaisen
- Stuart Little, directed by Doug Miller (national tour)

2014-2015

- Rapunzel! Rapunzel! A Very Hairy Fairy Tale, directed by Nancy Schaeffer
- Night of the Living Dead, directed by Artie Olaisen & Karl Schaeffer, Teen Scene
- Miracle on 34th Street, directed by Robyn Flatt & Doug Miller
- Frosty & Friends, Kathy Burks Theater of Puppetry Arts
- Skippyjon Jones, directed by Nancy Schaeffer
- Teen Brain: The Musical, directed by Nancy Schaeffer, Teen Scene
- The Tale of Peter Rabbit, Kathy Burks Theater of Puppetry Arts
- Balloonacy, directed by Dick Monday
- Jackie & Me, directed by Rene Moreno
- The Musical Adventures of Flat Stanley, directed by Michael Serrecchia (national tour)

2015-2016

- Fancy Nancy, directed by Nancy Schaeffer
- Sleepy Hollow, directed by Artie Olaisen, Teen Scene
- Miracle on 34th Street, directed by Robyn Flatt & Doug Miller
- Not a Creature Was Stirring, Kathy Burks Theater of Puppetry Arts
- A Year with Frog and Toad, directed by Cheryl Denson
- dont u luv me?, directed by Nancy Schaeffer, Teen Scene
- Hansel and Gretel, Kathy Burks Theater of Puppetry Arts
- The Miraculous Journey of Edward Tulane, directed by Artie Olaisen
- Balloonacy, directed by Dick Monday
- Pinkalicious The Musical, directed by Nancy Schaeffer
- The BFG (Big Friendly Giant), directed by Doug Burks (national tour)

2016-2017

- Seussical, directed by Nancy Schaeffer
- Dracula: The Vampire Play, directed by Artie Olaisen, Teen Scene
- A Charlie Brown Christmas, directed by Doug Miller
- The Nutcracker, Kathy Burks Theater of Puppetry Arts
- Junie B. Jones Is Not a Crook, directed by Nancy Schaeffer
- EAT (It's Not About Food), directed by Nancy Schaeffer, Teen Scene
- Jack and the Beanstalk, Kathy Burks Theater of Puppetry Arts
- Tomas and the Library Lady, directed by Robyn Flatt
- Blue, directed by Dick Monday
- James and the Giant Peach, directed by Artie Olaisen
- Mufaro's Beautiful Daughters, directed by Robyn Flatt (national tour)

2017-2018

- Goosebumps the Musical: Phantom of the Auditorium, directed by Nancy Schaeffer
- Ghouls & Graveyards, directed by Artie Olaisen, Teen Scene
- A Charlie Brown Christmas, directed by Doug Miller
- Frosty & Friends, Kathy Burks Theater of Puppetry Arts
- The Very Hungry Caterpillar Show, directed by Doug Burks
- Screen Play, directed by Nancy Schaeffer, Teen Scene
- Yana Wana's Legend of the Bluebonnet, directed by Robyn Flatt
- Blue, directed by Dick Monday
- Jungalbook, directed by Artie Olaisen
- How I Became a Pirate, directed by Doug Miller (national tour)

2018-2019

- Treasure Island: Reimagined!, directed by Robyn Flatt
- A Wrinkle In Time, directed by Artie Olaisen, Teen Scene
- Magic Tree House's Holiday Musical: A Ghost Tale for Mr. Dickens, directed by Nancy Schaeffer
- The Snowy Day and Other Stories by Ezra Jack Keats, directed by Guinea Bennett-Price
- Ella Enchanted: The Musical, directed by Nancy Schaeffer
- The Secret Life of Girls, directed by Nancy Schaeffer, Teen Scene
- Tuck Everlasting, directed by Artie Olaisen
- The Island of the Skog, directed by Robyn Flatt
- Diary of a Worm, a Spider & a Fly, directed by BJ Cleveland (national tour)

2019-2020

- Disney's Beauty and the Beast, directed by Nancy Schaeffer
- The Very Hungry Caterpillar Christmas Show, directed by Douglass Burks
- Little Women: the Musical, directed by K. Doug Miller
- Schoolhouse Rock Live!, directed by Nancy Schaeffer
- Last Stop on Market Street, directed by Vickie Washington
- Balloonacy, directed by Dick Monday
- Miss Nelson Has a Field Day, directed by K. Doug Miller

2020-2021

- Andi Boi, directed by Bruce R. Coleman
- Miss Nelson Has a Field Day, directed by K. Doug Miller
- Idris Goodwin's Social Justice Play: Watergun Song, directed by Jamal Gibran Sterling
- Idris Goodwin’s Social Justice Play: Nothing Rhymes With Juneteenth, directed by Cherish Robinson
- The Raven Society, directed by Nancy Schaeffer and Teen Scene
- Idris Goodwin’s Social Justice Play: #Matter, directed by Feleceia Wilson (Benton)
- My Faraway Adventure Kit, directed by Dick Monday

2021-2022

- DCT Presents...Circo Metropolis, directed by Dick Monday
- Paddington Saves Christmas, directed by Douglass Burks
- Dragons Love Tacos, directed by Nancy Schaeffer
- The Lion, The Witch, and the Wardrobe, directed by Artie Olaisen
- 10 seconds, directed by Richard Quadri

== Sources ==
- Churnin, Nancy. "Dallas Children's Theater celebrates its 25th Anniversary". The Dallas Morning News, May 13, 2009.
