= Circle Dogs =

Children's picture book by Kevin Henkes

- Author: Kevin Henkes
- Illustrator: Dan Yaccarino
- Cover artist: Yaccarino
- Language: English
- Genre: children's books picture books
- Publisher: Greenwillow Books
- Publication date: 1998
- Publication place: United States
- Pages: 32
- ISBN: 978-0-0644-3757-8

Circle Dogs is a children's picture book written by Kevin Henkes and illustrated by Dan Yaccarino. It was published in 1998 by Greenwillow Books. The story is about a day in the life of two dachshunds (the titular "circle dogs", so called because of the shape they make when sleeping) and the family they live with.

== Awards and reception ==
The book was named a Charlotte Zolotow Award "Highly Commended Title" in 1999, being praised for its description of life with playful dogs as seen by a young child, "illustrations [that] are at once sophisticated and childlike", and overall "old-fashioned feel", comparing it to the writing of Margaret Wise Brown. The book also received a positive review in The New York Times, with James McMullan calling it "an evocative piece of writing that would be a joy to read aloud to a child." He also praised the illustrations, but felt that they were not necessarily a good match for the story.
