= Kevin Henkes =

American author and illustrator (born 1960)

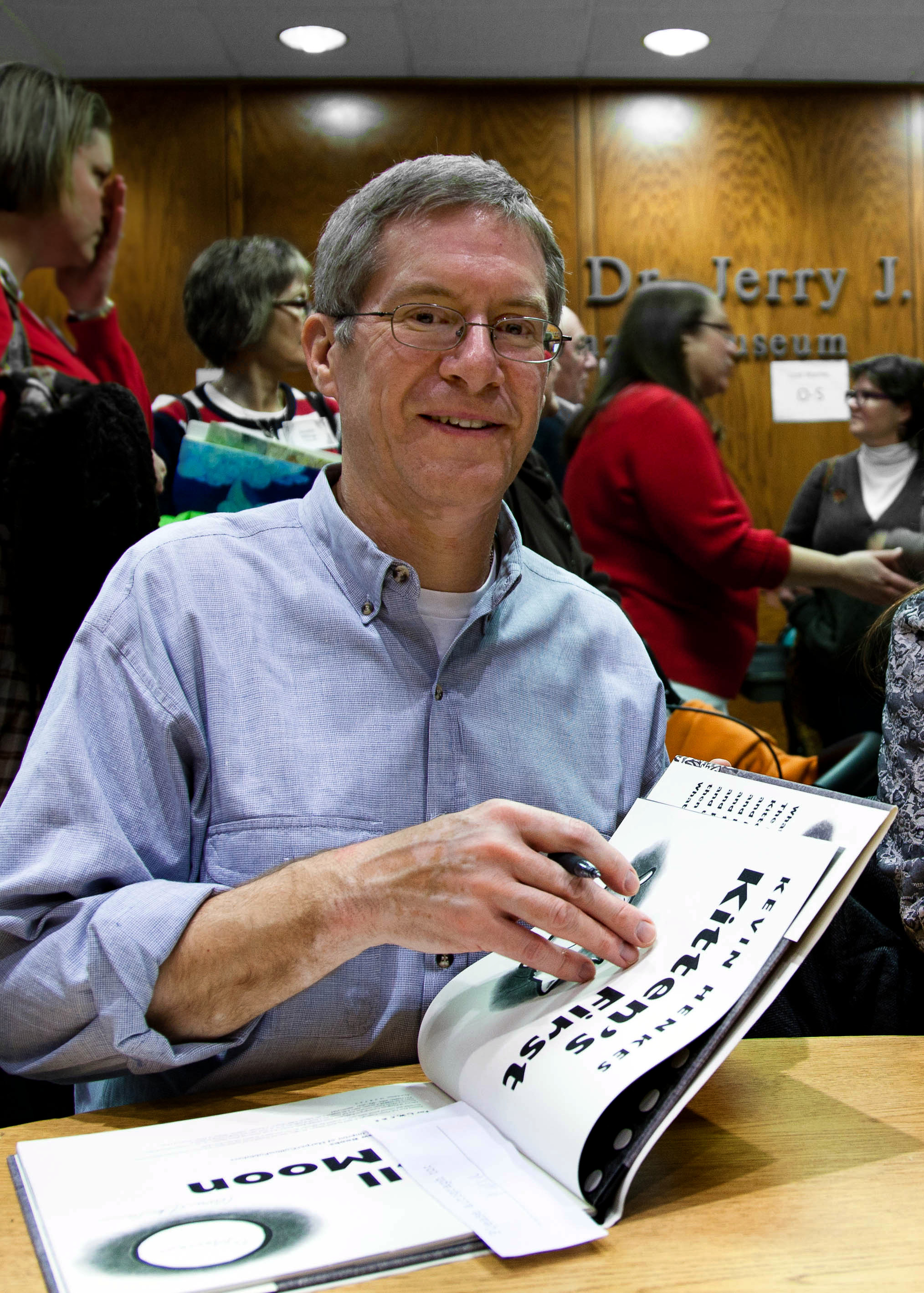
- Henkes at the Mazza Museum, 2011
- Born: November 27, 1960 (age 65); Racine, Wisconsin, U.S.
- Education: University of Wisconsin–Madison
- Occupations: Illustrator, writer
- Spouse: Laura Dronzek (m. 1985)
- Children: 2
- Writing career
- Period: 1981–present
- Genre: Children's literature
- Notable works: Sheila Rae, the Brave; Chrysanthemum; Circle Dogs; Olive's Ocean; Kitten's First Full Moon; Waiting
- Notable awards: Caldecott Medal; 2005; Children's Literature Legacy Award; 2020
- Website: kevinhenkes.com

Kevin Henkes (/heɪnkɛs/ HENK-es; born November 27, 1960) is an American author of children's books. He is known for writing and illustrating picture books, the most notable of which feature young anthropomorphic mice as their main characters. Henkes also writes middle-grade fiction. As an illustrator, he won the Caldecott Medal for Kitten's First Full Moon (2004). Two of Henkes's books were Newbery Medal Honor Books, Olive's Ocean in 2004 and The Year of Billy Miller in 2014. His picture book Waiting was named both a 2016 Caldecott Honor Book and a Geisel Honor Book. It was only the second time any author has won that combination of awards.

In 2020, Henkes won the Children's Literature Legacy Award.

== Early life and career ==
Kevin Henkes was born on November 27, 1960, in Racine, Wisconsin. He thought he would be an artist until his junior year of high school when a teacher encouraged Henkes in his writing efforts. Henkes discovered that children's books combined both his literary and artistic interests. Henkes wrote his first book during his freshman year at the University of Wisconsin-Madison. The book's theme deals with how a child describes the pleasures of occasional solitude. This theme became common in many of Henkes's later books. Henkes, one of five children, says that many of his storylines are inspired by his family and the neighborhood where he grew up.

Henkes has written and illustrated around 50 critically acclaimed and award-winning picture books, early readers, and novels in his career thus far. Henkes's first book, All Alone, was published in 1981 by Greenwillow Books. More than 50 books followed, including Chrysanthemum and Lilly's Purple Plastic Purse. In 1994, Henkes was a runner-up for one of the premier American Library Association (ALA) children's book awards, the Caldecott Medal for Owen, one of his mouse books. In 2004, Henkes was a runner-up for the Newbery Medal for Olive's Ocean. The following year, he won the Caldecott Medal for Kitten's First Full Moon, recognizing that as the year's best children's picture book published in the United States. All of Henkes's books to date have been published by Greenwillow Books. He won the inaugural Phoenix Picture Book Award in 2013 for Owen.

The Phoenix Awards from the Children's Literature Association recognize the best books that did not win major awards when they were first published twenty years earlier. In 2014, Henkes received a Newbery Honor for his book, The Year of Billy Miller. In 2020, he was awarded the ALA's Children's Literature Legacy Award, celebrating his entire body of work. Henkes and his wife, Laura Dronzek, have collaborated on a series of picture books based on the four seasons, with Henkes writing the story and Dronzek providing the acrylic painting illustrations.

== Personal life ==
Henkes lives in Madison with his wife, artist Laura Dronzek, and their two children.

== Awards and honors ==
Henkes has won numerous awards for both his books and as an author. In 2007, Henkes delivered the Arbuthnot Honor Lecture, an honor bestowed upon "an individual of distinction in the field of children’s literature ... chosen to write and deliver a lecture that will make a significant contribution to the world of children’s literature". In 2008, he won the Council for Wisconsin Writers' Major Achievement Award. In 2009, Henkes was a finalist for the Astrid Lindgren Prize and won the Jeremiah Ludington Award, which honors "an individual who has made a significant contribution to the paperback book business". In 2020, he won the Children's Literature Legacy Award honoring an author or illustrator, published in the United States, whose books have made a "significant and lasting contribution to literature for children".

In 1987, Library of Congress named Once Around the Block one of the Best Books of the Year. In 2017, the American Booksellers Association inducted Kitten's First Full Moon into their Picture Book Hall of Fame. The Year of Billy Miller was a New York Times bestselling book. Kirkus Reviews and The Horn Book Magazine named it one of the best books of 2013. Waiting was a New York Times bestselling book. Kirkus Reviews and The Horn Book named it one of the best books of 2013. The Horn Book has included many of Henkes's other books on their lists of the best children's books of the year: Jessica (1989), Julius, the Baby of the World (1990), Chrysanthemum (1991), Words of Stone (1992), Owen (1993), Lilly’s Purple Plastic Purse (1996), Olive’s Ocean (2003), A Good Day (2007), Old Bear (2008), Birds (2009), Penny and Her Doll (2012), Penny and Her Marble (2013), Waiting (2015), Egg (2017), A Parade of Elephants (2018), Penny and Her Sled (2019), Billy Miller Makes a Wish (2021), and Oh, Sal (2022).

Awards for Henkes's books
Year	Title	Award	Result	Ref.
1986	Grandpa & Bo	Council of Wisconsin Writers Children's Book Award	Winner	
1988	The Zebra Wall	Council of Wisconsin Writers Children's Book Award	Winner	
1991	Chrysanthemum	Council of Wisconsin Writers Children's Book Award	Winner	
1993	Owen	Archer-Eckblad Children's Picture Book Award	Winner	
1993	Words of Stone	Judy Lopez Memorial Award for Children's Literature	Nominee	
1993	Words of Stone	Elizabeth Burr / Worzalla Award	Winner	
1994	Owen	Caldecott Medal	Honor	
1996	Protecting Marie	Elizabeth Burr / Worzalla Award	Winner	
1997	Lilly's Purple Plastic Purse	American Booksellers Book of the Year: Children's	Winner	
1999	Circle Dogs	Charlotte Zolotow Award	Highly commended	
2003	Owen's Marshmallow Chick	Charlotte Zolotow Award	Highly commended	
2004	Kitten's First Full Moon	Betty Ren Wright Children's Picture Book Award	Honorable Mention	
2004	Olive's Ocean	Newbery Medal	Honor	
2005	Kitten's First Full Moon	Caldecott Medal	Winner	
2005	Kitten's First Full Moon	Charlotte Zolotow Award	Winner	
2005	Kitten's First Full Moon	Midwest Booksellers' Choice Award for Children's Picture Book	Winner	
2007	A Good Day	Midwest Booksellers' Choice Awards	Winner	
2007	Lilly's Big Day	Charlotte Zolotow Award	Highly commended	
2008	A Good Day	Charlotte Zolotow Award	Highly commended	
2009	Birds	Great Lakes Book Awards	Finalist	
2009	Old Bear	Charlotte Zolotow Award	Highly commended	
2009	Old Bear	Great Lakes Book Awards	Finalist	
2010	Birds	Charlotte Zolotow Award	Honor	
2010	My Garden	Goodreads Choice Award for Picture Book	Nominee	
2011	Little White Rabbit	Goodreads Choice Award for Picture Book	Nominee	
2011	My Garden	Charlotte Zolotow Award	Highly commended	
2012	Jessica	ALSC Notable Children's Recordings	Selection	
2014	Penny and Her Marble	Theodor Seuss Geisel Award	Honor	
2014	The Year of Billy Miller	Elizabeth Burr / Worzalla Award	Winner	
2014	The Year of Billy Miller	Newbery Medal	Honor	
2014	The Year of Billy Miller	E. B. White Read Aloud Award	Finalist	
2014	Lilly’s Purple Plastic Purse	ABA Picture Book Hall of Fame	Finalist	
2015	Waiting	Goodreads Choice Award for Best Picture Books	Nominee	
2016	Waiting	ALSC Notable Children's Books	Selection	
2016	Waiting	Caldecott Medal	Honor	
2016	Waiting	Charlotte Zolotow Award	Highly commended	
2016	Waiting	Theodor Seuss Geisel Award	Honor	
2018	Egg	Eisner Award for Best Publication for Early Readers	Finalist	
2018	In the Middle of Fall	Charlotte Zolotow Award	Highly commended	
2019	A Parade of Elephants	ALSC Notable Children's Books	Selection	
2019	Winter is Here	Charlotte Zolotow Award	Highly commended	
2019	A Parade of Elephants	ALSC Notable Children's Books	Selection	
2020	Sun Flower Lion	Charlotte Zolotow Award	Highly commended	
2020	Sun Flower Lion	Children's Literature Legacy Award	Winner	
2022	Little Houses	Charlotte Zolotow Award	Highly commended	

== Publications ==
=== Novels ===
==== Standalone books ====
- Return to Sender (1984, ISBN 978-0-1403-8556-4)
- Two Under Par (1987, ISBN 978-0-0607-5695-6)
- The Zebra Wall (1988, ISBN 978-0-0607-3303-2)
- Words of Stone (1992, ISBN 978-0-0607-8230-6)
- Protecting Marie (1995, ISBN 978-0-1403-8320-1)
- Sun & Spoon (1997, ISBN 978-0-6881-5232-1)
- The Birthday Room (1999, ISBN 978-0-0644-3828-5)
- Olive's Ocean (2003, ISBN 978-0-0605-3545-2)
- Bird Lake Moon (2008, ISBN 978-0-0614-7076-9)
- Junonia (2011, ISBN 978-0-0619-6417-6)
- Sweeping up the Heart (2019, ISBN 978-0-0628-5254-0)

==== Miller Family books ====
The Miller Family books are published by Greenwillow Books.

- The Year of Billy Miller (2013, ISBN 978-0-0622-6815-0)
- Billy Miller Makes a Wish (2021, ISBN 978-0-0630-4279-7)
- Oh, Sal (2022, ISBN 978-0-0632-4492-4)
- Still Sal (2024, ISBN 978-0-0633-8964-9)
- Poppy (2026, ISBN 978-0-0635-1718-9)

=== Picture books ===
==== Standalone books ====
- All Alone (1981, ISBN 978-0-0605-4115-6)
- Clean Enough (1982, ISBN 978-0-6880-0828-4)
- Margaret & Taylor (1983, ISBN 978-0-6880-1425-4)
- Bailey Goes Camping (1985, ISBN 978-0-6881-5288-8)
- Grandpa and Bo (1986, ISBN 978-0-0662-3837-1)
- Once Around the Block, illustrated by Victoria Chess (1987, ISBN 978-0-6880-4955-3)
- Jessica (1989, ISBN 978-0-6881-5847-7)
- Shhhh (1989, ISBN 978-0-6880-7985-7)
- The Biggest Boy, illustrated by Nancy Tafuri (1995, ISBN 978-0-6881-2827-2)
- Good-bye, Curtis, illustrated by Marisabina Russo (1995, ISBN 978-0-6881-2827-2)
- Circle Dogs, illustrated by Dan Yaccarino (1998, ISBN 978-0-6881-5446-2)
- Oh!, illustrated by Laura Dronzek (1999, ISBN 978-0-6881-7053-0)
- Kitten's First Full Moon (2004, ISBN 978-0-0605-8828-1)
- So Happy!, illustrated by Anita Lobel (2005, ISBN 978-0-0605-6483-4)
- A Good Day (2007, ISBN 978-0-0611-4018-1)
- Old Bear (2008, ISBN 978-0-0615-5205-2)
- Birds, illustrated by Laura Dronzek (2009, ISBN 978-0-0613-6304-7)
- My Garden (2010, ISBN 978-0-0617-1517-4)
- Little White Rabbit (2011, ISBN 978-0-0620-0642-4)
- Waiting (2015, ISBN 978-0-06236-8430)
- When Spring Comes: An Easter And Springtime Book For Kids, illustrated by Laura Dronzek (2016, ISBN 978-0-0623-3139-7)
- Egg (2017, ISBN 978-0-0624-0873-0)
- In the Middle of Fall, illustrated by Laura Dronzek (2017, ISBN 978-0-0625-7311-7)
- A Parade of Elephants (2018, ISBN 978-0-0626-6828-8)
- Winter Is Here, illustrated by Laura Dronzek (2018, ISBN 978-0-0627-4719-8)
- Summer Song, illustrated by Laura Dronzek (2020, ISBN 978-0-0628-6613-4)
- Sun Flower Lion (2020, ISBN 978-0-0628-6611-0)
- A House (2021, ISBN 978-0-0630-9260-0)
- Little Houses, illustrated by Laura Dronzek (2020, ISBN 978-0-0629-6573-8)
- The World and Everything in It (2023, ISBN 978-0-0632-4564-8)
- Finding Things, illustrated by Laura Dronzek (2024, ISBN 978-0-06-324566-2)
- Is It Spring? (2026, ISBN 978-0-06-351532-1)

==== Mouse books ====
The Mouse books are published by Greenwillow Books.

- A Weekend with Wendell (1986, ISBN 978-0-6881-4024-3)
- Sheila Rae, the Brave (1987, ISBN 978-0-6881-4738-9)
- Chester's Way (1988, ISBN 978-0-6881-5472-1)
- Julius, the Baby of the World (1990, ISBN 978-0-6881-4388-6)
- Chrysanthemum (1991, ISBN 978-0-6881-4732-7)
- Owen (1993, ISBN 978-0-6881-1449-7)
- Lilly's Purple Plastic Purse (1996, ISBN 978-0-6881-2897-5)
- Wemberly Worried (2000, ISBN 978-0-6881-7027-1)
- Sheila Rae's Peppermint Stick (2001, ISBN 978-0-0602-9451-9)
- Owen's Marshmallow Chick (2002, ISBN 978-0-0600-1012-6)
- Julius's Candy Corn (2003, ISBN 978-0-0605-3789-0)
- Lilly's Chocolate Heart (2003, ISBN 978-0-0605-6066-9)
- Wemberly's Ice-Cream Star (2003, ISBN 978-0-0605-0405-2)
- A Box Full of Lilly (2006, ISBN 978-0-0611-2852-3)
- Lilly's Big Day (2006, ISBN 978-0-0607-4236-2)

==== Penny books ====
The Penny books are published by Greenwillow Books.

- Penny and Her Doll (2012, ISBN 978-0-0620-8199-5)
- Penny and Her Song (2012, ISBN 978-0-0620-8195-7)
- Penny and Her Marble (2013, ISBN 978-0-0620-8203-9)
- Penny and Her Sled (2019, ISBN 978-0-0629-3456-7)
