= Kitten's First Full Moon =

2004 children's picture book by Kevin Henkes

- Author: Kevin Henkes
- Illustrator: Kevin Henkes
- Cover artist: Henkes
- Genre: Children's book
- Publisher: Greenwillow Books/Harper Collins Publishers
- Publication date: 2004
- Publication place: United States
- Pages: 31
- ISBN: 0-06-058828-4
- OCLC: 52386414
- Dewey Decimal: [E] 21
- LC Class: PZ7.H389 Ki 2004

Kitten's First Full Moon is an American children's picture book written and illustrated by Kevin Henkes. Published in 2004, the book tells the story of a kitten who thinks the moon is a bowl of milk and tries many different attempts to drink it. Henkes won the 2005 Caldecott Medal for his illustrations. The book is in black and white and typeset in sans-serif. The idea came from a line in another book by Henkes, "The cat thought the moon was a bowl of milk." Henkes gradually expanded on that for Kitten's First Full Moon.

== Plot ==
One night, a hungry female kitten sees a full moon for the first time and thinks it's a bowl of milk. She stretches up to get it, only to get a bug on her tongue and fall down the stairs. She then chases it but doesn't get closer, so she climbs a tall tree, but still couldn't reach it. Kitten becomes scared but then sees the pond and thinks it's another bowl of milk, so she climbs down from the tree and jumps in. A tired, unhappy and hungry kitten returns home to find a bowl of milk sitting on the porch waiting for her, and a lucky kitten goes to sleep.

== Awards and honors ==
In 2017, the American Booksellers Association inducted Kitten's First Full Moon into their Picture Book Hall of Fame.

Awards for Kitten's First Full Moon
Year	Award	Result	Ref.
2004	Betty Ren Wright Children's Picture Book Award	Honorable Mention	
2005	Caldecott Medal	Winner	
2005	Charlotte Zolotow Award	Winner	
2005	Midwest Booksellers' Choice Award for Children's Picture Book	Winner	

Awards
Preceded by The Man Who Walked Between the Towers	Caldecott Medal recipient 2005	Succeeded by The Hello, Goodbye Window
