= Dan Yaccarino =

American author, illustrator and television producer

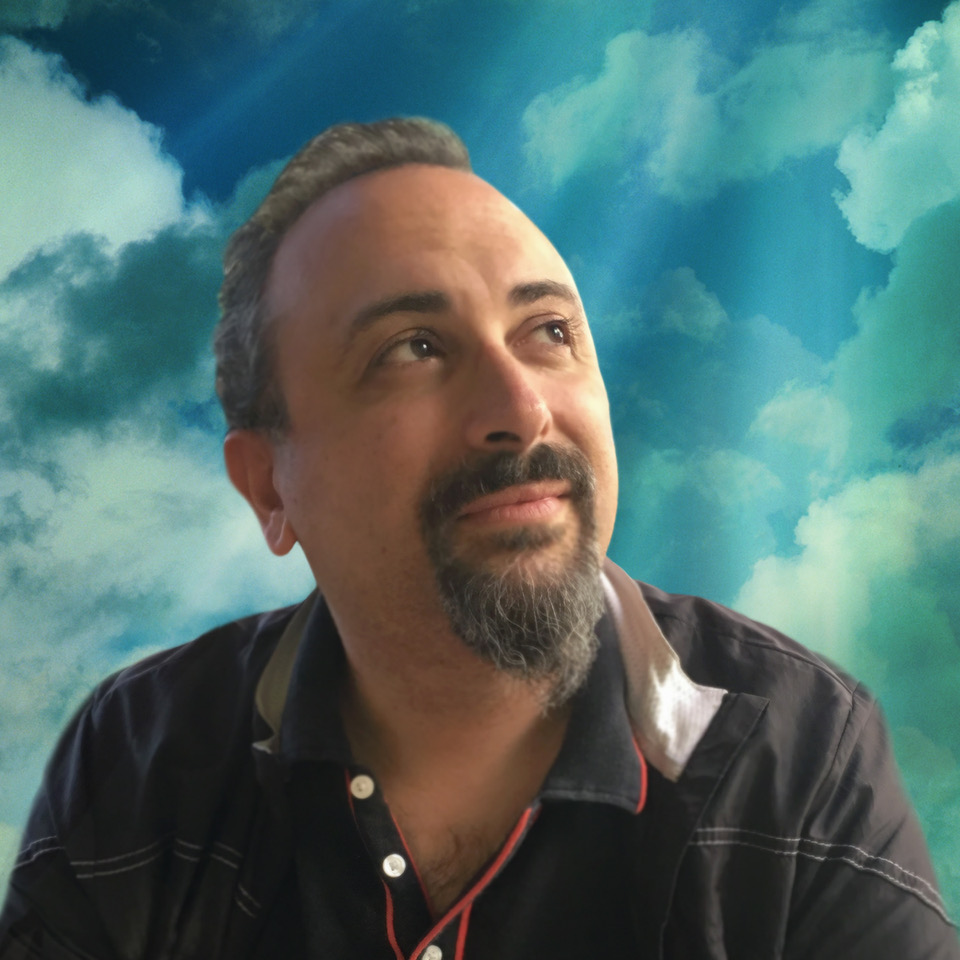
- Yaccarino in 2018
- Born: Dan Yaccarino; May 20, 1965 (age 61); Montclair, New Jersey, U.S.
- Occupations: Author; illustrator; television writer; television producer
- Writing career
- Years active: 1987–present
- Genres: Children's books, television shows

Dan Yaccarino (born May 20, 1965) is an American author, illustrator, television writer, and producer, who is known for his animated series, children's books and award-winning imagery. Yaccarino created the Nick Jr. preschool series Oswald.

== Biography ==
Born in Montclair, New Jersey, Yaccarino was influenced by a combination of advertising, comic books, vintage animation, toys, and old films, spending his childhood immersed in drawing, writing, and making movies.

Yaccarino attended Otis College of Art and Design in Los Angeles, CA, as well as Parson School of Design in NYC, where he earned a BFA in illustration in 1987.

"I'm inspired by other children’s book authors and illustrators," Yaccarino was quoted in saying, "as well as people from other fields like the director Henry Selick and singer-songwriter Brian Wilson."

Very soon after graduation, he began a commercial illustration career, starting with the New York Times Book Review, quickly moving on to national newspapers and magazines, as well as advertising campaigns.

== Children's literature ==
Yaccarino wrote and illustrated his first picture book Big Brother Mike in 1993 and has created dozens of books for children since, most notably Piccolo, Every Friday, The Fantastic Undersea Life of Jacques Cousteau, Unlovable and the autobiographical, All the Way To America: The Story of A Big Italian Family and A Little Shovel. He has also illustrated stories written by some of the most prestigious names in children's literature, including Margaret Wise Brown, Jack Prelutsky, and Kevin Henkes. Yaccarino's work in children's literature has garnered many glowing reviews and a worldwide following. He has been invited over the years to the White House to share his books and participate in the annual Easter festivities. He has also presented his work at Pixar Animation Studios and keynoted several children's literature conferences.

== Series ==
Yaccarino is the creator and executive producer of Apple TV+'s Doug Unplugs, the Nick Jr. series Oswald, and Willa's Wild Life (with Canada-based Nelvana), as well as the character designer behind Nick Jr.'s The Backyardigans.

Animation Magazine hails him as "an American original".

== Illustration ==
Yaccarino's illustrations have adorned the pages of such publications as The New York Times, Rolling Stone, Travel & Leisure, Business Week, Network World, Psychology Today, and New York Magazine. He has created images for a wide variety of corporate projects and advertising campaigns as well, including Cotton Inc, AT&T and Gardenburger. His work is widely received in Japan, and he has worked extensively for clients such as Sony and Nikkei.

== Partial bibliography ==
- Big Brother Mike
- Bam Bam Bam
- One Hole in the Road
- If I Had a Robot
- Zoom Zoom Zoom! I’m Off to the Moon!
- Good Night, Mr. Night
- An Octopus Followed Me Home
- Five Little Pumpkins
- Five Little Ducks
- Little White Dog
- Circle Dogs
- Trashy Town
- Deep in the Jungle
- Blast Off Boy and Blorp: First Day on a Strange New Planet
- Blast Off Boy and Blorp: New Pet
- Blast Off Boy and Blorp: The Big Science Fair
- Come With Me
- Surviving Brick Johnson
- Oswald
- Unlovable
- The Good Little Bad Little Pig
- The Lima Bean Monster
- Dan Yaccarino’s Mother Goose
- Where the Four Winds Blow
- Bittle
- The Birthday Fish
- Every Friday
- Who Will Sing a Lullaby?
- Go Go America
- Little Boy With a Big Horn
- The Fantastic Undersea Life of Jacques Cousteau
- Lawn to Lawn
- Cooking With Henry and Ellibelly
- All the Way To America: The Story of A Big Italian Family and A Little Shovel
- The Belly Book
- Boy & Bot
- Kate and Nate Are Running Late
- Doug Unplugged
- Zorgoochi Intergalactic Pizza
- Billy & Goat at the State Fair
- The Happyland series
- Class Pet Squad: Journey to the Center of Town
- I am a Story
- Morris Mole
- Giant Tess
- Smashy Town
- The Longest Storm
- City Under the City
- Big Jobs/Bold Women #1- Firefighter Flo
- Big Jobs/Bold Women #2- Crane Jane
- One Two, Grandma Loves You
- Piccolo
