= An Octopus Followed Me Home =

1997 picture book by Dan Yaccarino

- Author: Dan Yaccarino
- Illustrator: Dan Yaccarino
- Genre: Comedy; Children's picture book
- Publisher: Viking Children's Books
- Publication date: 1997
- Publication place: United States

An Octopus Followed Me Home is a 1997 American children's picture book by American writer and illustrator Dan Yaccarino. The book has been adapted by Yaccarino into an animated television series called, Willa's Wild Life, directed by Steve Sullivan.

== Plot ==
The book tell the story of a young girl who takes a green octopus home. When the girl asks her father if she can keep the octopus in the bathtub, he tells her about all the other animals he let her keep and all the sacrifices he made. The saddened girl returns the green octopus back to the ocean, but becomes happy again when a gray dinosaur follows her home.

== Characters ==
- The Girl is the main character of the book. The Girl had an octopus follow her home after school. Before the octopus followed her home, many other animals followed her home. For instance a giraffe, an ostrich, a million rabbits, and other animals followed her home. The Girl's name is never mentioned in the book. The Girl is an inspiration of Willa.
- Dad is The girl's father. Dad doesn't like the animals The Girl brings home around the house, but, knowing how much The Girl loves them, he lets her keep them. When The Girl brings the octopus home, Dad becomes tired of sacrificing and tells her to return the octopus to its original home. Dad is an inspiration of Willa's Dad.
- The Octopus is the octopus that follows The Girl home. At the beginning of the book, The Girl asked her father if she can keep him in the bathtub. Her father tells The Girl to return The Octopus to the sea. The Octopus becomes sad when he goes back to his real home.
- The Crocodile is one of the animals that followed The Girl home. The Crocodile sleeps under Dad's bed, and won't let him sleep at all. The Crocodile is an inspiration of Gus.
- The Seals are a group of three seals who float around in Dad’s pool and won’t let him swim. The Seals are an inspiration of Steve and Edie.
- The Giraffe is one of the other animals that followed The Girl home. Whenever The Girl goes to school, The Giraffe says good-bye with its head sticking out of the chimney. The Giraffe is an inspiration of Jenny.
- The Bear is a grizzly bear that is hibernating in the living room behind the couch. The Bear is an inspiration of Bert.
- The Penguins are a flock of seventeen penguins who live in the refrigerator as they all need refrigerating. The Penguins are an inspiration of Inky, Blinky, and Bob.
- The Mountain Goats are a group of three mountain goats who live on the roof of the Girl’s house.
- The Rabbits are a group of thousands of gray, orange, brown and white rabbits that multiply every day. The Rabbits are inspirations of the rabbits.
- The Elephants are a pair of elephants who are kept in the two-car garage. The Elephants are an inspiration of Tiny and Lou.
- The Dinosaur is a gray dinosaur that follows The Girl home at the end of the book.
- The Ostrich is an ostrich that is seen in the beginning having its head stuck in the opening of the kitchen drain.
- The Tiger is a tiger seen in the beginning outside in the lawn while Dad is mowing.
