= Oswald (TV series) =

2001–2003 animated children's TV series

- Genre: Animated series Preschool; Children's animation
- Created by: Dan Yaccarino
- Developed by: Lisa Eve Huberman; Dan Yaccarino
- Directed by: Debbie Bonzon; Henry Lenardin-Madden
- Voices of: Fred Savage; Debi Derryberry; David Lander; Crystal Scales; Laraine Newman; Daran Norris; J. Grant Albrecht; Mel Winkler; Dan Yaccarino
- Countries of origin: United States; United Kingdom
- Original language: English
- No. of seasons: 1
- No. of episodes: 26 (52 segments)

Production
- Producer: Dan Yaccarino
- Running time: 22–24 minutes
- Production companies: HIT Entertainment PLC; Nickelodeon Animation Studios (Note: Credited as Nick Jr. Productions.)

Original release
- Network: Nick Jr. (United States); Milkshake! (United Kingdom)
- Release: 20 August 2001 – 19 September 2003

Oswald is a children's animated television series for preschool children created by Dan Yaccarino and developed by Lisa Eve Huberman. The show was co-produced by HIT Entertainment (later acquired by Mattel) and Nickelodeon. The titular character is an anthropomorphic blue octopus named Oswald, who lives in an apartment complex with his dachshund Weenie.

An overall 26 episodes were produced. In the United States, the series premiered on Nickelodeon (as part of its Nick Jr. block) on 20 August 2001. Reruns were also broadcast on CBS (during the Nick Jr. on CBS block) and on Noggin. When the Noggin brand was relaunched as a streaming service in 2015, all 26 episodes of Oswald were made available for streaming.

Prior to airing, Brown Johnson (senior vice president of Nick Jr.) said "Dan Yaccarino has created an octopus who could be a pre-schooler's best friend".

== Premise ==
The series is set in Big City, a colorful world populated by anthropomorphic animals, mythological creatures and humanoid beings. Each episode follows the daily experiences of an anthropomorphic blue octopus named Oswald, accompanied by his beloved hot dog-shaped dog, Weenie, and their life in the cheerful and whimsically-designed community of Big City. Commonly, the program concentrates on Oswald's experiences with friends, acquaintances and neighbors, including Henry, a penguin, and Daisy, a flower, among others and his patient methods of coping with or tolerating different situations and dilemmas, along with his thoroughly optimistic outlook on life.

== Characters ==
=== Main ===
Main characters from left to right: Oswald, Weenie, Henry, and Daisy

- Oswald (voiced by Fred Savage in the US and Richard Pearce in the UK) is the main character who lives in an apartment complex in Big City. A very gentle, polite and bighearted anthropomorphic blue octopus with a bowler hat, Oswald is always willing to go out of his way to help his friends. His hobbies are playing the piano and singing.
- Weenie (vocal effects by Debi Derryberry) is Oswald's dachshund. She bears a strong resemblance to a hot dog and only communicates in "bark-speak". She accompanies Oswald everywhere he goes, and her favorite food is dog biscuits.
- Henry (voiced by David Lander in the US and David Holt in the UK) is Oswald's downstairs penguin neighbor and best friend. Stubborn, sarcastic, moody yet somewhat level-headed, Henry is a creature of habit in every way and usually shuns the idea of trying different things, though he can sometimes be persuaded otherwise. He tries his best to maintain a rigid schedule. As such, he takes care of his extensive spoon collection, watches Penguin Patrol every evening, and does the Penguin Polka before bedtime. Most of Henry's favorite foods are fish-flavored. He is a proven expert on snow. Additionally, he has an identical cousin from the frozen north named Louie, and on occasion speaks of an Aunt Arctica. His motto is "Slow and steady!" He always takes three marshmallows in his hot cocoa, "no more, no less." He also hates getting wet.
- Daisy (voiced by Crystal Scales in the US and Moir Leslie in the UK) is a tall orange/yellow/green flower. Free-spirited and energetic yet a little clumsy, Daisy participates in sports and other activities. She is a close friend of both Oswald and Henry, the three of them often go on adventures together. Daisy loves sunflower sundaes, riding her unicycle, has a large leaf collection and loves peppermint tea. Daisy is very excitable and often has to be hushed by Oswald when she speaks too loudly.

=== Recurring ===
- Johnny Snowman (voiced by Mel Winkler in the US and Colin McFarlane in the UK) is a laid-back snowman who operates an ice cream shop and also has an ice cream truck. He has a deep baritone voice. He also has a brother in the frozen north named Phil.
- Egbert (voiced by Daran Norris in the US and Gary Martin in the UK) and Leo (voiced by J. Grant Albrecht in the US and David Holt in the UK) are eggs who are twin brothers. Leo always responds in conversations with an enthusiastic "Yes, yes!" while Egbert refers to everyone as "old boy".
- Madame Butterfly (voiced by Laraine Newman in the US and Moir Leslie in the UK) is the proprietor of the local diner, a favorite lunch stop for Oswald and his friends. Her name is a pun on the opera Madama Butterfly.
- Catrina (voiced by Debi Derryberry) is a baby caterpillar that is just learning how to speak. She is the only child of Madame Butterfly. Like other babies, Catrina is highly curious about everything around her, but is always attended by her mom or others to keep her curiosity in check.

=== Minor ===
- Pongo (voiced by Richard Kind in the US and Gary Martin in the UK) is a large yellow and red dragon with a long thin green mustache and is quite similar to the dragons in Chinese culture and folklore. He lives in a Chinese-style home in Big City. In sharp contrast to his otherwise intimidating size, Pongo is very shy and soft-spoken, and known for his occasional clumsiness.
- Buster is a very slow-moving silent turtle living in the same apartment building as Oswald. He appears in several episodes.
- Cactus Polly (voiced by Laraine Newman in the US and Jo Wyatt in the UK) is a helpful Southern-accented cactus lady who carries a lasso and talks like a cowgirl from the wild west.
- The mostly silent gingerbread people reside in Big City and are often seen in the backgrounds of episodes.
- Sammy Starfish (voiced by Tony Orlando) is Oswald's musical idol who is a jazz singer. Oswald's dream is to play the piano for Sammy Starfish, which becomes a reality when Sammy's show comes to Big City and the tickets are all sold out.
- Steve Tree (voiced by Fred Stoller in the US and Gary Martin in the UK) is a walking, talking tree. Sometimes his pet Woodrow pecks on him, usually on his head.
- Andy Pumpkin (voiced by Eddie Deezen in the US and David Holt in the UK) is Steve's loopy best friend. He is a happy-go-lucky pumpkin person and works at a candy shop. He tends to speak in hyper tones when working in the candy shop.
- Bingette Bunny (voiced by Kathy Najimy) is a ditsy rabbit who runs the gardening store where Oswald buys his tomato plants. She is usually very unhelpful but usually says "Just doing my job!" when Oswald leaves the store.
- Roderick Robot is a mechanical man with a mechanical cat, Tinsel. Oswald cat-sits for Roderick, and it turns out Tinsel is a very naughty cat.
- Bingo (voiced by Mac Davis) is Big City's barber, a rabbit who also runs a newspaper store from which Henry buys his newspaper. He only talks in the episodes "Henry Needs a Haircut" and "The Naughty Cat".
- Louie (voiced by Michael McKean) is Henry's cousin from the arctic.
- Flippy is a fish who Oswald bought at the pet store but had to give to the Big City Aquarium as the fish grew too large.
- The Paper People are mostly silent humans made of paper who appear in several episodes as cameo characters.
- Woodrow is Steve's pet woodpecker.
- Tinsel is Roderick's pet mechanical cat.
- The fish appear in the episode "Going Fishing".
- Maestro Bingo runs a store of various musical instruments and appears in the episodes "Daisy Plays an Instrument" and "Fixing the Piano".
- Laverne is a white elephant.

== Episodes ==
No.	Title	Directed by	Written by	Storyboard by	Original release date
1	"Chasing the Ice-Cream Truck" "The Camping Trip"	Nelson Recinos Henry Lenardin-Madden	Annie Evans Suzanne Collins	Jim Schumann Kelly James	20 August 2001
Oswald and Weenie chase after Johnny's ice cream truck. / Oswald, Weenie, Henry and Daisy go camping in Big City Park, but it begins to rain, so they rush back to Oswald's apartment building and camp there instead.
2	"The Polka Dot Umbrella" "One More Marshmallow"	Nelson Recinos George Chialtas and Henry Madden	Gary Apple	Diane Kredensor Mike J. Smith	21 August 2001
Oswald finds a polka dot umbrella and though he tries many times to get rid of it, it keeps finding him. But in the end, it really comes in handy. / Oswald hosts a tea party for Henry and Daisy but when Weenie eats one of the marshmallows for Henry's hot cocoa, Oswald goes to a confectionery and encounters many obstacles in trying to make his way back to the tea party.
3	"Daisy Plays an Instrument" "The Ball of Yarn"	George Chialtas Henry Lenardin-Madden	Annie Evans J-P Chanda	Jim Schumann Mike Smith	22 August 2001
After listening to Oswald playing his grand piano, Daisy wishes she could play an instrument of her own, so Oswald takes her to the Big City music store where she tries out different instruments. / A ball of red yarn is Weenie's favorite toy to play with. When it begins to bounce, Oswald accidentally grabs a string of the yarn, making it unravel out of his apartment all the way out through the city. So Oswald and Weenie chase after it as it entangles several of their friends along the way.
4	"Down in the Dump" "The Birdhouse"	Henry Lenardin-Madden Christine Kolosov	Gary Apple Suzanne Collins	Kelly James Jim Schumann	23 August 2001
Oswald has to clean his apartment, but it doesn't turn out good. So when he decides to put the things he no longer needs in a wagon to take to the Big City dump, several citizens find uses for them. / Oswald builds a birdhouse, adds some color, and some flowers. But a rain advisory washes away the color, flowers, and bells making the birdhouse look plain, in which the birds like.
5	"Henry Needs a Haircut" "Flippy the Fish"	Henry Lenardin-Madden Nelson Recinos and Ken Kessel	Fred Stroppel Annie Evans	Mike Smith Karen Heathwood	24 August 2001
Henry has a feather sticking out on top of his head, but his feather will not stay down and he is scared to go to the barber's because he keeps thinking the barber is too scary. / Oswald buys a pet fish and names her Flippy because of the flip that she does, jumping out of her fishbowl and splashing back in it. Unfortunately, Flippy keeps overeating and growing bigger and bigger. So Oswald and Weenie take her to the Big City public aquarium, where she becomes a big star at a seal show the next day.
6	"Rollerskating" "I Guess You Never Know"	Henry Madden	Frederick Stroppel Gary Apple	Kelly James Mike Smith	27 August 2001
Oswald learns how to roller skate. / It is Henry's birthday, and Oswald tries to teach Henry to try new things on this special day.
7	"Sleepover" "Big Banana"	Henry Madden Nelson Recinos	Jeff Kindley Dan Yaccarino	Diane Kredensor	28 August 2001
Oswald and Weenie have a sleepover at Henry's apartment, and it's Weenie's very first sleepover ever. / Oswald plants a banana seed, and the next morning, he finds that it has grown into a colossal banana overnight. It is so big that he decides to have a "Big Banana Day" and share it with everyone, resulting in a new holiday with a festival in the park.
8	"Leaky Faucet" "Catrina's Birthday Cake"	George Chialtas Nelson Recinos	Rick Groel Annie Evans	Jim Schumann Diane Kredensor	29 August 2001
Oswald's kitchen sink springs a leak, causing the entire Big City to flood all over and he and Weenie to get separated. / Oswald bakes a huge birthday cake for Catrina's birthday party, but he crashes into Eggbert and Leo, causing the entire pastry to fall in a lake.
9	"Cloud Collecting" "Pongo the Friendly Dragon"	George Chialtas Henry Lenardin-Madden	Dan Yaccarino Fredrick Stroppel	Diane Kredensor Jim Schumann	10 September 2001
Daisy collects leaves and Henry collects spoons, so Oswald wants to collect something too, so he tries to collect clouds. / Oswald meets a friendly dragon named Pongo, who wants to help, only to makes things worse.
10	"A Nice Quiet Picnic" "The Big Parade"	Ken Kessel	Suzanne Collins Kate Long	Kelly James Mike Smith	17 September 2001
Oswald, Henry, and Weenie set out to have a picnic and are soon joined by many of their friends. / Oswald hears parade music and thinks that a big parade is headed his way, so he convinces Henry and Daisy to go with him to watch the parade, and end up inventing their own.
11	"The Go-Kart Race" "Autumn Leaves"	Henry Lenardin-Madden Ken Kessel	Annie Evans Frederick Stroppel	Karen Heathwood Diane Kredensor	24 September 2001
Oswald and his friends compete in a go-kart race and they all tie. / Henry tries to rake some fallen leaves, but Oswald and Weenie keep jumping on them which makes him frustrated.
12	"A Day at the Beach" "The Sand Sculpture Contest"	Henry Lenardin-Madden	Frederick Stroppel Geoff Stevenson	Karen Heathwood Kelly James	15 February 2002
Oswald and the gang go to the beach, but Henry does not like swimming. Luckily, as Daisy gets stranded on an island, it's Henry to the rescue! / Oswald is the judge of the Annual Big City Beach Sand Sculpture Contest.
13	"Fixing the Piano" "Henry Wants to Fly"	Ken Kessel Henry Lenardin-Madden	Justin Chanda Fredrick Stroppel	Jim Schumann Kelly James	8 March 2002
Oswald's piano is broken, so he takes it to Maestro Bingo to get it fixed, only to discover a ladybug inside. / Henry believes that he can fly, so he tries everything from his friends, but nothing works until a bubble traps him.
14	"Daisy and the Duckling" "The Double Date"	Henry Lenardin-Madden Ken Kessel	Alana Burgi Sanko Susan Kim	Mike Smith Karen Heathwood	15 March 2002
Oswald and Daisy find a duckling who becomes separated from her mother. / Henry is having a "Penguin Patrol" watch party and Daisy is having a backyard pool day, so Oswald schedules the two events at the same time.
15	"The Sniffles" "The Broken Vase"	Henry Lenardin-Madden Ken Kessel	Justin Chanda Suzanne Collins	Diane Kredensor Kelly James	21 March 2002
Oswald goes out into Big City to get some cocoa and a newspaper for Henry, who has an unsettling case of the Arctic Sniffles. But when a rain cloud chases Oswald and Weenie, Oswald catches them as well. / When Daisy accidentally breaks Henry's special vase, she, Oswald, and Weenie try to fix it in time before Henry gets back from his fly catching trip.
16	"The Big Balloon Rescue" "Snow to Go"	Robert Shellhorn Christine Kolosov	Susan Kim	Mike Smith Jim Schumann	22 July 2002
Catrina flies away on a balloon and Oswald must save her. / During a heat wave advisory, Oswald, Weenie, Henry and Daisy go on a trip to find the sweetest snow.
17	"Friends Indeed" "Sammy Starfish Live"	Henry Lenardin-Madden Robert Shellhorn	Suzanne Collins Dan Yaccarino	Mike Smith Jim Schumann	23 September 2002
Oswald finds himself stuck in the middle of a confrontation between an enraged Henry and Daisy. / As Oswald and Weenie see the news about their favorite singer, Sammy Starfish, performing live, all tickets have been sold out and Oswald must find another way to see the show.
18	"The Pet Show" "Going Fishing"	Robert Shellhorn Henry Lenardin-Madden	Annie Evans	Diane Kredensor Mike Smith	24 September 2002
It's the Big City Grand Pet Show, but as Weenie is behaving peculiarly of Steve's woodpecker, Woodrow, pecking down the tent, she wins 1st prize anyway. / Oswald, Weenie, Henry and Daisy go fishing but Henry whom is not catching a fish.
19	"The Naughty Cat" "The Giant Egg"	Robert Shellhorn Debbie Bonzon	Suzanne Collins Geoff Stevenson	Karen Heathwood Diane Kredensor	25 September 2002
Oswald pet-sits for Roderick Robot's pet cat, Tinsel, but Tinsel runs away and makes things worse. This makes Oswald frustrated, so he must save the day. / Oswald tries to find an egg's owner.
20	"A Sticky Situation" "Tutti-Frutti Pie"	Robert Shellhorn Henry Lenardin-Madden	Susan Kim Suzanne Collins	Kelly James Jim Schumann	26 September 2002
Oswald and Daisy try to make her Aunt Marigold's famous honey buns, but Daisy adds too much sticky honey, and they get stuck to each other, along with other friends. Luckily it starts to rain and everyone gets unstuck. / Oswald takes Catrina to pluck some tutti-frutti berries, only to get carried away with trying to eat them when her mother, Madame Butterfly, tells her no, causing problems.
21	"Job for a Day" "Perfect Match"	Robert Shellhorn Debbie Bonzon	Alana Burghi Sanko Frederick Stroppel	Mike Smith Diane Kredensor	27 September 2002
Johnny is sick, so Oswald and Weenie go to make a special ice cream delivery. / Pongo wants to become friends with Laverne the elephant.
22	"Odd One Out" "Goodbye Best Friend"	Henry Lenardin-Madden	Dan Yaccarino	Mike Smith Jim Schumann	15 September 2003
Oswald is excited to meet Henry's cousin, Louie. But the duo have a great time all by themselves and Oswald is left out. Luckily, as Henry and Louie catch up on old times, they seek Oswald out. / Oswald is sad as Henry decides to move back to the Frozen North with Louie, so the others have a going-away party for him. In the end, Henry decides to stay in Big City after saving them from being blown away, as Catrina goes too far with his balloons.
23	"The Tomato Garden" "Bird Watching"	Ken Kessel and Robert Shellhorn Henry Lenardin-Madden	Alana Burghi Sanko Kate Long	Karen Heathwood Kelly James	16 September 2003
As Oswald eats his last tomato for breakfast, he decides to get more by planting tomatoes in the garden, but he is surprisingly upset when he sees one of the tomatoes have been half eaten. It turns out the tomatoes are eaten by an entire group of unwanted snails, so Oswald ends up making a restaurant for the snails. / Oswald and Daisy go birdwatching, but Daisy is too loud, she scares the birds away. As Oswald finds a giant bird, she carries him in midair, so it's Daisy to the rescue, or bust!
24	"Catrina's First Snow" "The Snow Festival"	Nelson Recinos Christine Kolosov	JP Chanda Susan Kim	Diane Kredensor Karen Heathwood	17 September 2003
Oswald babysits Catrina on a snowy day, but every time Oswald shows Catrina all the fun things he is doing, Catrina is sad. / Oswald hopes for snow to fall on the day of Big City's snow festival.
25	"The Biggest Wish" "The Stopped Clock"	Henry Lenardin-Madden	S : Jason Edward, T : Frederick Stroppel Frederick Stroppel	Diane Kredensor Karen Heathwood	18 September 2003
Oswald finds a firefly. / As Big City's clock somehow is not working and all residents are still asleep, it is up to Oswald, Weenie, Henry and Daisy to figure out what is causing this stroking catastrophe to make the clock work again, and to wake up Big City.
26	"Weenie Needs a Bath" "Hide and Seek"	Henry Lenardin-Madden Robert Shellhorn	Suzanne Collins Alana Burghi Sanko	Diane Kredensor Kelly James	19 September 2003
Weenie gets dirty before having her picture taken, so Oswald takes Weenie for a bath, but she hates baths. / Weenie disappears during a game of hide and seek, only to hitch a ride in Johnny's ice cream truck.

== Release ==
=== Broadcast history ===
In the United States, Oswald first aired on the Nick Jr. television block on Nickelodeon on 20 August 2001. It was removed from the block on 10 October 2003, and the network on 24 May 2005. On 7 April 2003, Oswald started airing on Noggin during its daytime preschool block. Reruns also aired on the 24-hour Nick Jr. Channel upon its launch in 2009, but they were removed on 11 December 2014. The show aired briefly on Nick on CBS for one year from 22 September 2001, to 7 September 2002.

When the Noggin brand was relaunched as a streaming service in 2015, all 26 episodes of Oswald were made available for streaming. The series was added to Paramount+ (at the time CBS All Access) in January 2021.

=== Home media ===
Paramount Home Entertainment is the VHS and DVD distributor for the series in the United States while HIT Entertainment is the VHS and DVD distributor for the series internationally.

==== Main releases ====
Release date	Name	Number of episodes	Episode titles
2 September 2003	Best Buddies	4	"Odd One Out" / "Goodbye Best Friend"; "Friends Indeed" / "Sammy Starfish Live"
2 September 2003	Outdoors with Oswald	4	"A Day at the Beach" / "The Sand Sculpture Contest"; "The Tomato Garden" / "Bird Watching"
2 September 2003	Welcome to Big City!	8	"Odd One Out" / "Goodbye Best Friend"; "Friends Indeed" / "Sammy Starfish Live"; "A Day at the Beach" / "The Sand Sculpture Contest"; "The Tomato Garden" / "Bird Watching"
27 January 2004	On-the-Go Oswald	8	"Daisy and the Duckling" / "The Double Date"; "Chasing the Ice-Cream Truck" / "The Camping Trip"; "Henry Needs a Haircut" / "Flippy the Fish"; "A Sticky Situation" / "Tuffi-Frutti Pie"

==== Episodes on Nick Jr. compilation DVDs (US only) ====
Release date	Name	Number of episodes	Episode titles
24 May 2005	Nick Jr. Favorites Vol. 1	2	"A Day at the Beach" / "The Sand Sculpture Contest"
26 September 2006	Nick Jr. Favorites Holiday	2	"Catrina's First Snow" / "The Snow Festival"

== Reception ==
The series received four out of five stars on Common Sense Media.
