= Kevin Kling =

American storyteller

- Born: Osseo, Minnesota, United States

Kevin Kling is an American storyteller and a commentator for National Public Radio.

== Life and career ==
Kling grew up in Osseo, Minnesota, and graduated from Gustavus Adolphus College in 1979 with a Bachelor of Arts in Theatre. He began his career in the Twin Cities during the 1990s with two plays that wrote: 21A and Fear and Loving in Minneapolis.

In 1993, Kling won the Whiting Award for drama. In 2009, he won the A. P. Anderson Award for Outstanding Contributions to Literature and the Arts in Minnesota.

Kling has also made regular storytelling contributions to NPR’s All Things Considered. He has released several CD collections, including a boxed set, Collected Stories. His first published book of short stories was The Dog Says How followed by four more titles.

Kling has not been slowed in his work by a birth defect that shriveled his left arm and a motorcycle accident that completely paralyzed his right arm.

== Plays ==
- 21A
- Fear and Loving in Minneapolis
- Home and Away
- Lloyd's Prayer
- The Education of Walter Kauffman
- The Seven Dwarfs
- Hammer, Anvil and Stirrup
- Lilly's Purple Plastic Purse
- Invisible Fences (with Gaelynn Lea)
- The Ice Fishing Play

== Books ==
- The Dog Says How, Borealis Books, 2007
- Kevin Kling's Holiday Inn, Borealis Books, 2009
- Big Little Brother, Borealis Books, 2011
- Big Little Mother, Borealis Books, 2013
- On Stage with Kevin Kling, Minnesota Historical Society Press, 2013

== Recordings ==
- 1994 Home and Away
- 2001 Stories Off the Shallow End
- 2003 Wonderlure
- 2004 A Fool's Paradise
- 2004 Collected Stories
- 2007 Alive
- 2012 State Fair
- 2014 Come & Get It

== Awards ==
- 1986 Heideman Best Short Play Award for 21A
- 1993 Whiting Award
- 2009 A.P. Anderson Award
- 2010 Storytelling World Storytelling Collection, for "The Dog Says How"
- 2012 National Storytelling Network's Circle of Excellence Award
