= Doug Unplugs =

Children's animated television series on Apple TV+

- Promotional poster
- Genre: Children's animation adventure
- Based on: Doug Unplugged by Dan Yaccarino
- Developed by: Jim Nolan
- Voices of: Brandon James Cienfuegos; Kyrie McAlpin; Eric Bauza; Mae Whitman; Leslie David Baker; Burl Moseley; Becky Robinson
- Country of origin: United States
- Original language: English
- No. of seasons: 2
- No. of episodes: 26

Production
- Executive producers: Aliki Theofilopoulos; Dan Yaccarino; Jim Nolan
- Running time: 23 minutes
- Production company: DreamWorks Animation Television

Original release
- Network: Apple TV+
- Release: November 13, 2020 – April 1, 2022

Doug Unplugs is an American children's computer-animated television series produced by DreamWorks Animation for Apple TV+. The series is based on the Doug Unplugged children's book series by Dan Yaccarino. The first seven episodes of season one were released on November 13, 2020, with the next six episodes released on April 2, 2021. The second season premiered on September 17, 2021.

== Premise ==
Doug Unplugs follows a little boy named Doug, who is a robot, and his 9-year-old human friend, Emma, as they experience and learn how the world works.

== Cast and characters ==
- Brandon James Cienfuegos as Doug
- Kyrie McAlpin as Emma Pine
- Eric Bauza as Bob Bot
- Mae Whitman as Becky Bot
- Leslie David Baker as Uncle Forknick
- Burl Moseley as Laurence Pine
- Becky Robinson as Jenny Droneberg

== Episodes ==
=== Series overview ===
Season	Episodes	Originally released	
Season	Episodes	First released	Last released
1	13	November 13, 2020	April 2, 2021
2	13	September 17, 2021	April 1, 2022

=== Season 1 (2020–21) ===
No. overall	No. in season	Title	Directed by	Written by	Original release date
1	1	"Whole Bot of Fun"	Ruolin Li	Jim Nolan & Dan Yaccarino	November 13, 2020
1	1	"Volunteer Bot"	Murray Debus	Michael Rhea	November 13, 2020
2	2	"Bot on the Beach"	Michael Goguen	Jeff D'Elia, Jim Nolan & Michael Rhea	November 13, 2020
2	2	"Bot of the Party"	Michael Goguen	Jeff D'Elia, Jim Nolan & Michael Rhea	November 13, 2020
3	3	"Vacation Bots"	Michael Goguen	Jeff D'Elia, Sarah Nerboso & Mia Resella	November 13, 2020
3	3	"Bots of the Forest"	Michael Goguen	Jeff D'Elia, Sarah Nerboso & Mia Resella	November 13, 2020
4	4	"A Bot's Best Friend"	Michael Goguen	Jeff D'Elia, Sarah Eisenberg & Michael Rhea	November 13, 2020
4	4	"A Bot in His Natural Habitat"	Michael Goguen	Jeff D'Elia, Sarah Eisenberg & Michael Rhea	November 13, 2020
5	5	"Shop 'Til Ya Bot"	Michael Goguen	Jeff D'Elia, Sarah Nerboso & Michael Rhea	November 13, 2020
5	5	"Adventure Bots"	Michael Goguen	Jeff D'Elia, Sarah Nerboso & Michael Rhea	November 13, 2020
6	6	"Bot on the Farm"	Michael Goguen	Jeff D'Elia, Jim Nolan & Michael Rhea	November 13, 2020
6	6	"Bot-Cycle Built for Two"	Michael Goguen	Jeff D'Elia, Jim Nolan & Michael Rhea	November 13, 2020
7	7	"Bots for Dinner"	Michael Goguen	Jeff D'Elia, Tom Martin & Michael Rhea	November 13, 2020
7	7	"It's the Bot That Counts"	Michael Goguen	Jeff D'Elia, Tom Martin & Michael Rhea	November 13, 2020
8	8	"Bots at the Museum"	Andrew Thom	Michael Rhea	April 2, 2021
8	8	"X Marks the Bot"	Ruolin Li	Noelle Wright	April 2, 2021
9	9	"Kicking and Botting"	Michael Goguen	Jeff D’ Elia	April 2, 2021
9	9	"Bot on the Case"	Michael Goguen	Noelle Wright	April 2, 2021
10	10	"Camper Bots"	Michael Goguen	Jeff D’ Elia	April 2, 2021
10	10	"Bots to Read"	Michael Goguen	Noelle Wright	April 2, 2021
11	11	"Like Botter, Like Son"	Michael Goguen	Jeff D’ Elia	April 2, 2021
11	11	"Give It a Bot"	Michael Goguen	Mia Resella	April 2, 2021
12	12	"Stop, Bot & Boogie"	Michael Goguen	Laura Bowes & Jeff D’ Elia	April 2, 2021
12	12	"Bots in Show"	Michael Goguen	Jordan Geroshowitz	April 2, 2021
13	13	"Where No Bot Has Gone Before!"	Michael Goguen	Jeff D’ Elia	April 2, 2021
13	13	"A Bot from the Heart"	Michael Goguen	Jeff D’ Elia	April 2, 2021

=== Season 2 (2021–22) ===
No. overall	No. in season	Title	Directed by	Written by	Original release date
14	1	"Bot to School"	Allan Jacobsen; Ricky Santana, and Michael Goguen	Katie Daniel	September 17, 2021
14	1	"Bots at Play"	Allan Jacobsen; Ricky Santana, and Michael Goguen	Michael Rhea	September 17, 2021
15	2	"When Life Gives You Bots"	Ruolin Li, Ricky Santana, and Michael Goguen	Michael Rhea	September 17, 2021
15	2	"Bots of the Fall"	Ruolin Li, Ricky Santana, and Michael Goguen	Jeff D’ Elia	September 17, 2021
16	3	"Backstage Bots"	Michael Goguen, Stephen Cooper, & Ruolin Li	Michael Rhea	September 17, 2021
16	3	"Super Bots"	Michael Goguen, Stephen Cooper, & Ruolin Li	Jeff D’ Elia	September 17, 2021
17	4	"Band of Bots"	Michael Goguen, Ricky Santana, & Marc Wasik	Laura Bowes	September 17, 2021
17	4	"Abracabot"	Michael Goguen, Ricky Santana, & Marc Wasik	Michael Rhea	September 17, 2021
18	5	"Bots on the Range"	Allan Jacobsen & Michael Goguen	Laura Bowes	September 17, 2021
18	5	"Brushin' Bots"	Allan Jacobsen & Michael Goguen	Michael Rhea	September 17, 2021
19	6	"Aquabots"	Michael Goguen; Ruolin Li, and Andy Thom	Michael Rhea	September 17, 2021
19	6	"Botographers"	Michael Goguen; Ruolin Li, and Andy Thom	Scott Gray	September 17, 2021
20	7	"Botty Holidays"	Michael Goguen; Ricky Santana, & Marc Wasik	Michael Rhea & Noelle Wright	September 17, 2021
21	8	"Carnival Bots"	Michael Goguen; Andy Thom & Allan Jacobsen	Liam Farrel	April 1, 2022
21	8	"Busy Bots"	Michael Goguen; Andy Thom & Allan Jacobsen	Laura Bowes & Michael Rhea	April 1, 2022
22	9	"Bots on the Go"	Michael Goguen; Allan Jacobsen; & Marc Wasik	Laura Bowes & Michael Rhea	April 1, 2022
22	9	"Take a Bot to Work"	Michael Goguen; Allan Jacobsen; & Marc Wasik	Laura Bowes & Michael Rhea	April 1, 2022
23	10	"Hot Bots"	Michael Goguen; Allan Jacobsen; & Ricky Santana	Laura Bowes & Michael Rhea	April 1, 2022
23	10	"Make-Believe Bots"	Michael Goguen; Allan Jacobsen; & Ricky Santana	Laura Bowes & Michael Rhea	April 1, 2022
24	11	"Night at the Bots"	Michael Goguen; Ricky Santana; & Marc Wasik	Laura Bowes; Michael Rhea; & Scott Gray	April 1, 2022
24	11	"Squishy Bots"	Michael Goguen; Ricky Santana; & Marc Wasik	Laura Bowes & Michael Rhea	April 1, 2022
25	12	"Botany Bots"	Michael Goguen; Allan Jacobsen; & Marc Wasik	Liam Farrell; Laura Bowes; & Michael Rhea	April 1, 2022
25	12	"Bugs and Bots"	Michael Goguen; Allan Jacobsen; & Marc Wasik	Laura Bowes & Michael Rhea	April 1, 2022
26	13	"Bots of Appreciation"	Mark Wasik & Ricky Santana	Laura Bowes & Michael Rhea	April 1, 2022
26	13	"Bot Scouts"	Mark Wasik & Ricky Santana	Michael Rhea; Laura Bowes; & Scott Gray	April 1, 2022

== Release ==
Doug Unplugs was one of the several children's television series that were coming to Apple TV+ in 2020. The first half of season one was released on November 13, 2020, with the second half released on April 2, 2021. The second season premiered on September 17, 2021.

== Accolades ==
Kyrie McAlpin was nominated for Outstanding Younger Voice Performer in an Animated or Preschool Animated Program at the 1st Children's and Family Emmy Awards.
