= The Year of Billy Miller =

Book by Kevin Henkes

- Author: Kevin Henkes
- Illustrator: Kevin Henkes
- Language: English
- Genre: Novel
- Publisher: Greenwillow Books
- Publication date: 2013
- Publication place: United States
- Media type: Print
- Pages: 240
- ISBN: 0062268120

The Year of Billy Miller, a 2014 children's book written by Kevin Henkes, was a Newbery Honor book in 2014.

== Plot ==
Right before the end of summer vacation, 7-year-old Billy Miller hits his head, causing him to start second grade with a lump on his head. Billy is not worried until he overhears worrying that he may become forgetful later in life because of his fall. Billy begins to worry that his mom's concerns will become reality and that he is not smart enough for second grade. He thinks he needs to do more than is expected to succeed. As the school year goes by, Billy learns to navigate second grade to the best of his ability. He also starts to appreciate his hard working mother and father and his sister, whom he learns to treat with more respect.

== Characters ==
- Billy Miller A typical 7-year-old boy with unrealistic worries.
- Mama Working mother, High school teacher who would do anything for her son Billy.
- Papa Stay at home father. Fun and supportive.
- Sally Miller Billy's 3-year-old sister.
- Ms. Silver Billy's second grade teacher, understanding and willing to help.
- Emma Sparks Billy's classmate; rude, puts people down (including Billy).
- Gabby Sal and Billy's babysitter.
- Ned Henderson Billy's best friend.

== Critical reception ==
In The Horn Book Magazine, Thom Barthelmess states, "The Year of Billy Miller is nuanced and human, this quiet novel takes aim squarely at the everyday difficulties of a specific segment of growing up and finds its mark with tender precision." Ilene Cooper states in the Book List Publications "Since this is so age specific, older readers might pass it by. That would be too bad, because this is a story with a lot of heart and sweet incites into growing up." Cheryl Ashton writes in School Journal "Billy himself might have been daunted by a book with more than 200 pages, but eager young readers will find this a great first chapter book to share or read solo." Kevin Illus states in Kirkus Reviews, "Henkes offers what he so often does in these longer works for children: a sense that experiences don't have to be extraordinary to be important and dramatic."

== Awards and honors ==
The Year of Billy Miller was a New York Times bestselling book. Kirkus Reviews and The Horn Book named it one of the best books of 2013.

Awards for The Year of Billy Miller
Year	Award	Result	Ref.
2014	Theodor Seuss Geisel Award	Honor	
2014	Elizabeth Burr / Worzalla Award	Winner	
2014	Newbery Medal	Honor	
2014	E. B. White Read Aloud Award	Finalist	
2014	ABA Picture Book Hall of Fame	Finalist	

== See also ==
- 2013 in literature
- Children's Literature
