= Waiting (picture book) =

2015 picture book by Kevin Henkes

- Author: Kevin Henkes
- Illustrator: Kevin Henkes
- Cover artist: Henkes
- Language: English
- Genre: Children's book
- Published: 2015 HarperCollins
- Publication place: United States
- Pages: 32
- ISBN: 978-0062368430

Waiting is a children's picture book written and illustrated by American author and illustrator Kevin Henkes. Waiting was published by HarperCollins in 2015.

== About the book ==
Waiting is a 2016 Caldecott Honor book, a Theodor Seuss Geisel Honor Book as well as a New York Times best-selling book. Waiting teaches children the seasons, new games and friendships. Waiting also teaches children the importance of waiting in ways that children can learn but also have fun while doing so. The author uses very soft touches of brown, green and blue colors to make very soft rounded shapes.

== Plot ==
Five toys sit on a windowsill all waiting for something to happen. There is an owl waiting to see the Moon, there is a pig with an umbrella waiting to see the rain, there is a puppy with a snow sled waiting to see the snow, there is a bear with a kite waiting to see the wind, and finally there is a rabbit looking outside the window just happy to contemplate what is happening outside.
