= Olive's Ocean =

2003 children's book

- Author: Kevin Henkes
- Illustrator: Kevin Henkes
- Language: English
- Genre: Children's novel
- Publication date: 2003
- Publication place: United States
- Media type: Print (Hardcover)

The novel Olive's Ocean was written by Kevin Henkes and was originally published in 2003. It received the 2004 Newbery Honor. The story's idea was taken from Kevin Henkes' question, "What was it like for authors growing up?"

Olive's Ocean was 59 on the American Library Association's list of the 100 most challenged books from 2000 to 2009 for having "sexually explicit content and offensive language."

== Plot ==
Every summer, Martha leaves her home in Wisconsin to visit her grandmother, Godbee, on the Atlantic Ocean. One year, Martha’s classmate Olive dies in a hit-and-run accident. Olive’s mother later delivers to Martha a page from Olive’s journal. The page reveals that Olive had admired Martha from afar despite never speaking to or hanging out with her, and that they had a lot in common, particularly a love of the ocean and a wish to become a writer. Martha begins to regret having not known Olive very well.

When Martha's family arrives at Godbee's house, an argument between Martha's parents creates tension between everyone in the family. Martha distances herself from her family out of anger and becomes closer to Godbee. They decide to share one secret about themselves every day of Martha's stay. In the meantime, Martha begins to write a story about Olive as a memorial.

During her stay, Martha develops a crush on Jimmy, a friend of her older brother Vince, though Godbee warns her to be careful around Jimmy. Martha decides to make Jimmy a character in her story about Olive, renaming him James. Jimmy, who is interested in film-making, is collecting footage to make a film about "life," covering various facets such as family, death, and love. Martha contributes to the “death” portion of the film with a recorded interview in which she tells Olive's story. As part of the "love" section of the film, Jimmy spontaneously sets up his camera on the way back home and kisses her. Later, Martha learns that Jimmy made a bet with Vince and some other boys as to whether he could get her to kiss him on camera before they returned from sailing. Heartbroken, she scraps the portion of her story about Olive and James. Later, Jimmy's younger brother Tate apologizes to Martha for his brother's actions.

As her stay at Godbee's house draws to an end, Martha fills a jar of ocean water to give to Olive's mother to fulfill Olive's dream, which had been to see the ocean for herself. Martha also decides to abandon her story about Olive. After Martha says goodbye to Godbee, Tate gives her a bag and a note in which he again apologizes on behalf of Jimmy and confesses that he likes her. When she gets to the airport, Martha finds Jimmy's tape inside the bag.

Back in Wisconsin, Martha goes to Olive's mother to give the ocean water to her, only to find that Olive's mother has moved away. Martha writes Olive’s name with ocean water on the front step of Olive's house until the water runs out. Martha stays until the sun dries up the writing, then, having finally made peace with Olive’s death, returns home to her loving family.
