= Willa's Wild Life =

Animated children's television series

- Created by: Dan Yaccarino
- Based on: An Octopus Followed Me Home by Dan Yaccarino
- Developed by: Steven Sullivan
- Directed by: Gary Hurst; Catherine Méziat
- Voices of: Jordan Todosey; Danny Wells; Samantha Reynolds; Dwayne Hill; Darren Frost; Sunday Muse; Lisa Norton; Peter Keleghan; Katie Bergin; Jay T. Schramek
- Composers: Geoff Bennett; Andre Hirz; Ben Johannesen
- Countries of origin: Canada; France
- Original language: English
- No. of seasons: 1
- No. of episodes: 26 (52 segments)

Production
- Executive producers: Dan Yaccarino; Philippe Delarue; Scott Dyer; Doug Murphy; Paul Robertson
- Running time: 25 minutes
- Production companies: Nelvana Limited; Futurikon

Original release
- Network: YTV (Canada); TF1 (TFOU)/Piwi (France)
- Release: October 6, 2008 – January 31, 2009

Willa's Wild Life is an animated television series for preschool children, based on Dan Yaccarino's book An Octopus Followed Me Home. The series originally aired on Qubo in the United States, YTV in Canada and TF1 and Piwi+ in France on October 6, 2008. The series is Flash-animated with Toon Boom Harmony. 26 episodes were produced.

== Overview ==
The series is about a girl named Willa who has a giraffe, a camel, two elephants, an alligator, and many more zoo animals as pets, all of whom she can speak to, though it's a secret only she and the animals know. Simply put, she has something of a backyard zoo.

== Characters ==
=== Humans ===
- Willa (voiced by Jordan Todosey) is the main character of the series, who has many exotic animals, much to her father's discomfort. She has many wacky adventures and learns lessons along the way. Because of her adventures, she often gets into trouble. Willa is kindhearted and caring and never tries to hurt her friends' feelings.
- Dooley (voiced by Samantha Reynolds) is Willa's next-door neighbour and best friend. He often gets caught up in Willa's adventures. He helps Willa learn lessons during their adventures.
- Willa's father (voiced by Peter Keleghan) is Willa's single father. He is uncomfortable with the animals around the house, but knowing how Willa cares for them, he lets her keep them. He helps Willa learn lessons along the way. He loves and cares for Willa. He apparently has a crush on Ms. Vanderwinkle. His real name is never revealed. There's not enough evidence to know who Willa's mother is and it's unknown if Willa's father is a divorcee or a widower.
- Sara, Kara, and Lara are friends (for over a year) who look, dress, and act the same and think they are cooler than everyone. They often bully Willa, Dooley and Evelyn, and use the wrong names, calling Willa "Wanda/Wendy/Willetta/Wilma/Winifred/Winona" and Dooley "Danny/Dickie/Donnie/Dennis". They are members of the dance club, practice ballet and all own dogs.
  - Sara (voiced by Lauren Collins) has a pale skin tone and long blonde hair, red lipstick and pink fashion. She has a red poodle named Susu.
  - Kara (voiced by Sunday Muse) has a fair skin tone and long red hair, purple lipstick and purple fashion. She has a purple poodle named Kuku.
  - Lara (voiced by Alyson Court) has a tan skin tone and long brown hair, green lipstick and green fashion. She has a green poodle named Lulu.
- Evelyn (voiced by Lisa Norton) is Willa's friend. She frequently gets into Willa's adventures. She seems to be grumpy all the time and gets discouraged easily. With Willa and Dooley's help, she learns to have fun and be happy.
- Mr. Tremble (voiced by Dwayne Hill) is the assistant principal at Willa's class. He easily gets into Willa's adventures. When he is in Willa's adventures, he often loses his toupee.
- Ms. Delilah Vanderwinkle (voiced by Jayne Lewis) is Willa's other next-door neighbour. She has an orange cat named Tangerine, and a nephew named Buzzy whom Willa babysits in "Baby It's You". Ms. Vanderwinkle's first name was revealed in "Willa & Dooley Sitting in a Tree".
- The Mailman appears in some episodes and is mostly scared by Gus.
- Tiffy Tootle (voiced by Alyson Court) is a famous blonde-haired girl with decorative pigtails. She makes her only appearance in "Willa's Wonderful Life", and near the end of this episode, she sees her biggest fan Willa and her family makes pizzas.

=== Animals ===
- Gus (voiced by Danny Wells) is an alligator. He is rude and obnoxious. Whenever he has a chance, he tries to eat the Bunnies, but is always caught by either Willa or one of the so many animals. He sleeps under Willa's bed. Gus is always hungry, despite being an alligator.
- Jenny (voiced by Yanna McIntosh) is a giraffe. She is the wisest of the animals. She helps Willa during her adventures and acts as a mother figure to Willa since Willa's mother is not around. Due to her size, Jenny sleeps outside.
- Inky (voiced by Dwayne Hill), Blinky (voiced by Jay T. Schramek), and Bob are a trio of penguins. They are the least intelligent of all the animals. Bob cannot speak, he just makes gestures accompanied by trombone sounds. They call Willa "Gladys". They are very good at ice skating. They sleep in the freezer. They also have a love for herrings, like how real-life penguins eat herrings for survival.
- Koko (voiced by Katie Bergin) is a kangaroo from Australia. She has a pink bow on her head and keeps many things in her pouch, such as makeup products, scissors and a signed photograph of a famous kangaroo named Willard Wallaby. She sleeps in the living room. Koko is the girliest of the animals.
- Steve (voiced by Dennis Fitzgerald) and Edie (voiced by Jayne Lewis) are two seals that used to be in show business before living with Willa. Steve's skin is darker than Edie's. Edie has a flower hair clip on her head. They give a performance every week in Willa's backyard and are talented musicians. They sleep in the bathtub.
- Wallace (voiced by Dwayne Hill) is a walrus. He is the oldest of all the animals. He likes to tell stories about his adventures in the Arctic before moving in with Willa. He sleeps with Steve and Edie in the bathtub.
- Samuel (voiced by Dennis Fitzgerald) is a camel. He is the most sophisticated of the animals. Willa rides on his back to school every day. He sleeps along with KoKo in the living room.
- The Bunnies are dozens of rabbits in different colours. They are green, orange, blue, pink, and many more bright colours. They do not speak but they squeak and giggle all the time. They usually give out kisses when they are happy. They sleep everywhere in the house. Almost none of them are officially named, as Willa simply refers to them as "bunny" or "the bunnies".
- Bert (voiced by Dwayne Hill) is a bear. Before he lived with Willa and the other animals he lived in Russia. He is usually seen sleeping. Bert sleeps along with Koko and Samuel in the living room.
- Tiny (voiced by Darren Frost) and Lou (voiced by Dwayne Hill) are elephants. Of all the animals, they are the most immature. Tiny is blue and has a high pitched voice while Lou is yellow and has a low pitched voice. It is unknown if they are brothers. They do not like to give elephant rides unless Willa wants them to. They live in the garage.
- Susu, Kuku and Lulu are Sara, Kara and Lara's pet poodles. Susu is red, showing that she is Sara's dog. Kuku is purple, showing that she is Kara's dog. Lulu is green, showing that she is Lara's dog. Like their owners, they are snooty.
- Sparkle is Evelyn's pet spider. She is orange and red, and only appears in Spider Girl.
- Tangerine is Ms. Vanderwinkle's pet cat. Tangerine is orange, and only appears in Over the Fence.

== Episodes ==
No.	Title	Original release date
1	"Happy Willa's Dad's Day / Willa's Wild Pony Tale"	6 October 2008
2	"Who's Afraid of the Big Bad Vet? / Long Gone to Hong Kong"	7 October 2008
3	"Willa's Wild Walk / Willa's Top Dogs"	9 October 2008
4	"Willa Sets the Stage / Willa in the Wilderness"	10 October 2008
5	"Willa Willa Everywhere / Party Animals!"	11 October 2008
6	"Unbearable Bear / Willa's Fun Raiser"	12 October 2008
7	"An Alligator Ate My Homework / Hammering Away"	15 October 2008
8	"Hidden Treasure / Up, Up and Away"	16 October 2008
9	"Disappearing Act / Great Eggspectations"	19 October 2008
10	"Over the Fence / It Came from the Attic"	20 October 2008
11	"The Jenny Bus Fuss / Willa's Bedtime Story"	14 January 2009
12	"Baby It's You / Willa's Bad Hare Day"	15 January 2009
13	"Willa's Wild News / Willa's Journal"	16 January 2009
14	"Spider Girl / Willa on Ice"	17 January 2009
15	"Pas de Dooley / Perfect Partners"	18 January 2009
16	"Don't Let Go / Vet for a Day"	21 January 2009
17	"Willa's Not So Peaceable Kingdom / Go to Sleep Bert"	22 January 2009
18	"Nurse Willa / Willa and Dooley Sitting in a Tree"	23 January 2009
19	"Company's Coming / Growing Pains"	24 January 2009
20	"Willa Awards / To Ski or Not to Ski"	25 January 2009
21	"Dad's Big News / Little Miss Fitness"	26 January 2009
22	"Walk a Mile in Alligator Shoes / A Tall Walrus Tale"	27 January 2009
23	"The Girl Who Cried Ouch / When Dad's Away"	28 January 2009
24	"Feathered Friends / Forgetting Sara"	29 January 2009
25	"Willa's Sleepover / High Flying Willa"	30 January 2009
26	"Big Brother Gus / Willa's Wonderful Life"	31 January 2009

== Awards ==
In 2010, Art Director Adrian Thatcher received a Daytime Creative Emmy Award for Outstanding Individual Achievement for his work on Willa's Wild Life.
