= Kino's Storytime =

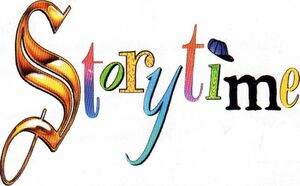
- Created by: Douglass Bailey
- Presented by: Anne Betancourt; Marabina Jaimes; Mark Ritts
- Theme music composer: John Nordstrom II
- Composer: John Nordstrom II
- Country of origin: United States
- No. of seasons: 3
- No. of episodes: 81

Production
- Executive producer: Patricia Kunkel
- Running time: 30 minutes per episode
- Production company: KCET

Original release
- Network: PBS
- Release: October 12, 1992 – September 1, 1997

Kino's Storytime, also known as Storytime, is an American children's reading television program which aired on PBS from October 12, 1992 until September 1, 1997. It was produced by KCET in Los Angeles, California. It was available on VHS from Strand Home Video and Video Treasures. It was co-hosted by Anne Betancourt as Lucy, Marabina Jaimes as Mara, and Kino, voiced and performed by puppeteer Mark Ritts.

== Cast ==
In addition to being co-hosted by Lucy, Mara and Kino, celebrity guest stars would sometimes visit the series and read stories, including:

- Tatyana Ali
- Jason Alexander
- Tim Allen
- María Conchita Alonso
- Jeff Altman
- Ed Asner
- John Astin
- René Auberjonois
- James Avery
- Barbara Bain
- Joanie Bartels
- Angela Bassett
- Shari Belafonte
- Valerie Bertinelli
- Mayim Bialik
- Rubén Blades
- Wilford Brimley
- Zachery Ty Bryan
- Brett Butler
- Gabriel Byrne
- Joanna Cassidy
- Peter Catalanotto
- Rosalind Chao
- Larry Cansler
- Diana Canova
- Barry Corbin
- Dave Coulier
- Jamie Lee Curtis
- Geena Davis
- Ellen DeGeneres
- Kim Delaney
- Suzanne Ciani
- Laura Dern
- Paul Dooley
- Michael Dorn
- Kirk Douglas
- Julia Duffy
- Kirsten Dunst
- Charles S. Dutton
- James Eckhouse
- Héctor Elizondo
- Ellaraino
- Elena Epps
- Jamie Farr
- Freddy Fender
- Janeane Garofalo
- Teri Garr
- Peri Gilpin
- Whoopi Goldberg
- John Goodman
- G. LeRoi Gray
- Robert Guillaume
- Steve Guttenberg
- Alaina Reed Hall
- Bob Harrison
- Melissa Joan Hart
- Dennis Haskins
- Salma Hayek
- Mariel Hemingway
- Christopher Hewett
- Telma Hopkins
- Michael Horse
- David Howard
- Janet Hubert
- Michael Jeter
- Arte Johnson
- Vicki Juditz
- Boney James
- Kim Karnsrithong
- David Keith
- Rae'Ven Kelly
- Leah Komaiko
- Joey Lawrence
- Sharon Lawrence
- Cloris Leachman
- Shari Lewis
- Gary "Litefoot" Davis
- Mario Lopez
- Ronn Lucas
- Tina Majorino
- Joseph Marcell
- Bill Martin, Jr.
- A Martinez
- James McDaniel
- Alley Mills
- Belita Moreno
- Tia and Tamera Mowry
- Pastor Arnold Murray
- Kathy Najimy
- Denise Nicholas
- Edward James Olmos
- Tom Paxton
- Felton Perry
- David Hyde Pierce
- Cara Pifko
- Amanda Plummer
- Patricia Polacco
- Annie Potts
- Paula Poundstone
- Kathleen Quinlan
- Raven-Symoné
- Markus Redmond
- Little Richard
- Patricia Richardson
- John Ritter
- Paul Rodriguez
- Marion Ross
- Victoria Rowell
- Holly Russell
- Theresa Saldana
- Fred Savage
- Tom Selleck
- Jane Seymour
- Madge Sinclair
- Wes Studi
- Patrick Swayze
- Lina Santiago
- Jonathan Taylor Thomas
- Katherine Thomerson
- Tamlyn Tomita
- Liz Torres
- Glynn Turman
- Reginald VelJohnson
- Jamie Walters
- Sunni Walton
- Malcolm-Jamal Warner
- Gedde Watanabe
- Carl Weintraub
- Ming-Na Wen
- Cindy Williams
- Kellie Shanygne Williams
- Lois Williams
- Mara Wilson
- Paul Winfield
- Diane Wolkstein
- Don and Audrey Wood
- Elijah Wood
- Alfre Woodard
- Ping Wu

== Episodes ==
=== Season 1 (1992–1994) ===
1. Books Read: Anna and the Little Green Dragon by Klaus Baumgart; The Little Polar Bear by Hans de Beer; Rose Meets Mr. Wintergarten by Bob Graham / Storytime Books: The Adventures of Isabel by Ogden Nash, pictures by James Marshall; Roses Sing on New Snow by Paul Yee, illustrated by Harvey Chan
2. Books Read: Chicka Chicka Boom Boom by Bill Martin, Jr. and John Archambault, illustrated by Lois Ehlert; Chicken Sunday by Patricia Polacco; Any Kind of Dog by Lynn Reiser / Storytime Picks: Pole Dog by Tres Seymour, pictures by David Soman; Eeny, Meeny, Miney Mole by Jane Yolen, illustrated by Kathryn Brown
3. Books Read: The Relatives Came by Cynthia Rylant, illustrated by Stephen Gammell; Five Bad Boys, Billy Que and the Dustdobbin by Susan Patron, pictures by Mike Shenon; Mama, Do You Love Me? by Barbara Joosse, illustrated by Barbara Lavallee / Storytime Picks: Something from Nothing by Phoebe Gilman; The Wild Woods by Simon James
4. Books Read: The Old Ladies Who Liked Cats by Carol Greene, pictures by Loretta Krupinski; Alistair's Elephant by Marilyn Sadler, illustrated by Roger Bollen; Ira Sleeps Over by Bernard Waber / Storytime Picks: What's Under My Bed? by James Stevenson; The Great Kapok Tree by Lynne Cherry
5. Books Read: My Little Red Car by Chris Demarest; Three Wishes by Lucille Clifton, illustrated by Michael Hays; The Magic House by Robyn Eversole, paintings by Peter Palagonia; Monster Mama by Liz Rosenberg, illustrated by Stephen Gammell / Storytime Picks: The Secret in the Matchbox by Val Willis, pictures by John Shelley; The Woman Who Flummoxed the Fairies retold by Heather Forest, illustrated by Susan Gaber
6. Books Read: The Gingerbread Man retold by Eric Kimmel, illustrated by Megan Lloyd; The Very Quiet Cricket by Eric Carle; Whistle for Willie by Ezra Jack Keats
7. Books Read: Mouse's Birthday by Jane Yolen, illustrated by Bruce Degen; Jonathan and His Mommy by Irene Hector-Smalls, illustrated by Michael Hays; The Story of Ferdinand by Munro Leaf, drawings by Robert Lawson; Wilfrid Gordon McDonald Partridge by Mem Fox, illustrated by Julie Vivas
8. Books Read: Owl Babies by Martin Waddell, illustrated by Patrick Benson; Two of Everything by Lily Toy Hong; A Mother for Choco by Keiko Kasza
9. Books Read: Timothy Goes to School by Rosemary Wells; Amazing Grace by Mary Hoffman, pictures by Caroline Binch; Rumpelstiltskin retold and illustrated by Paul O. Zelinsky; My Mom is Excellent by Nick Butterworth / Storytime Picks: Koala Lou by Mem Fox, illustrated by Pamela Lofts; Mr. Rabbit and the Lovely Present by Charlotte Zolotow, pictures by Maurice Sendak
10. Books Read: The Happy Day by Ruth Krauss, pictures by Marc Simont; Maggie and the Pirate by Ezra Jack Keats; Cuddly Dudley by Jez Alborough / Storytime Picks: The Snowy Day by Ezra Jack Keats; Choo Choo by Virginia Lee Burton
11. Books Read: That's Good! That's Bad! by Margery Cuyler, pictures by David Catrow; Horton Hatches the Egg by Dr. Seuss / Storytime Picks: The Rainbabies by Laura Krauss Melmed, illustrated by Jim LaMarche; Ragtime Tumpie by Alan Schroeder, paintings by Bernie Fuchs
12. Books Read: If You Give a Mouse a Cookie by Laura Joffe Numeroff, illustrated by Felicia Bond; Lady Bugatti by Joyce Maxner, illustrated by Kevin Hawkes; Little Peep by Jack Kent
13. Books Read: The Fish Who Could Wish by John Bush, illustrated by Korky Paul; Green Wilma by Tedd Arnold; Magic Spring by Nami Rhee; Stina by Lena Anderson / Storytime Picks: The Great Adventure of Wo Ti by Nathan Zimelman, illustrated by Julie Downing; Stina's Visit by Lena Anderson
14. Books Read: The Boy with Square Eyes by Juliet and Charles Snape; Franklin in the Dark by Paulette Bourgeois, illustrated by Brenda Clark; The Rough-Face Girl by Rafe Martin, illustrated by David Shannon / Storytime Picks: Little Toot by Hardie Gramatky; The Butterfly Jar by Jeff Moss, illustrated by Chris Demarest
15. Books Read: Two Badd Babies by Jeffie Ross Gordon, illustrated by Chris Demarest; Go Away, Big Green Monster! by Ed Emberley; The Amazing Bone by William Steig / Storytime Picks: Big Al by Andrew Clements, illustrated by Yoshi; Thunder Cake by Patricia Polacco
16. Books Read: Froggy Gets Dressed by Jonathan London, illustrated by Frank Remkiewicz; Ghost's Hour, Spook's Hour by Eve Bunting, illustrated by Donald Carrick; Daley B by Jon Blake, illustrated by Axel Scheffler / Storytime Picks: Martha Speaks by Susan Meddaugh; Time for Bed by Mem Fox, illustrated by Jane Dyer
17. Books Read: The Trouble with Mom by Babette Cole; The Dragon of an Ordinary Family by Margaret Mahy, pictures by Helen Oxenbury; Borreguita and the Coyote by Verna Aardema, illustrated by Petra Mathers
18. Books Read: Possum Come A-Knockin' by Nancy Van Laan, illustrated by George Booth; Elmer the Patchwork Elephant by David McKee; Abuela by Arthur Dorros, illustrated by Elisa Kleven; The Hungry Thing by Jan Slepian and Ann Seidler, pictures by Richard Martin
19. Books Read: Winnie the Witch by Valerie Thomas, illustrated by Korky Paul; The Last Time I Saw Harris by Frank Remkiewicz; Eddie and Teddy by Gus Clarke; One of Three by Angela Johnson, pictures by David Soman / Storytime Picks: Where's My Teddy? by Jez Alborough; A Job for Wittilda by Caralyn and Mark Buehner
20. Books Read: More, More, More Said the Baby by Vera Williams; Babushka's Doll by Patricia Polacco; Grandpa's Face by Eloise Greenfield, illustrated by Floyd Cooper
21. Books Read: Jamberry by Bruce Degen; The Ghost-Eye Tree by Bill Martin, Jr. and John Archambault, illustrated by Ted Rand; Baby Rattlesnake told by Te Ata, adapted by Lynn Moroney, illustrated by Veg Reisberg / Storytime Picks: Never Spit on Your Shoes by Denys Cazet; This is the Hat by Nancy Van Laan, pictures by Holly Meade
22. Books Read: Night Tree by Eve Bunting, illustrated by Ted Rand; Maebelle's Suitcase by Tricia Tusa; Ruby the Copycat by Peggy Rathmann / Storytime Picks: Fly Away Home by Eve Bunting, illustrated by Ronald Himler; A Three Hat Day by Laura Geringer, pictures by Arnold Lobel
23. Books Read: The Wolf's Chicken Stew by Keiko Kasza; Duckat by Gaelyn Gordon, illustrated by Chris Gaskin; The Emperor's New Clothes retold and illustrated by S.T. Mendelson / Storytime Picks: Beware of Boys by Tony Blundell; The Day of Ahmed's Secret by Florence Parry Heide and Judith Heide Gilliland, illustrated by Ted Lewin
24. Books Read: The Treasure by Uri Shulevitz; Julius, the Baby of the World by Kevin Henkes; The Happy Hedgehog Band by Martin Waddell, illustrated by Jill Barton / Storytime Picks: The Story of Ferdinand by Munro Leaf, drawings by Robert Lawson; Flossie and the Fox by Patricia C. McKissack, pictures by Rachel Isadora
25. Books Read: Greetings from Sandy Beach by Bob Graham; Socrates by Rascal and Gert Bogaerts; The Rooster Who Went to His Uncle's Wedding by Alma Flor Ada, illustrated by Kathleen Kuchera / Storytime Picks: Hattie and the Fox by Mem Fox, illustrated by Patricia Mullins; Me First by Helen Lester, illustrated by Lynn Munsinger
26. Books Read: Aunt Isabel Tells a Good One by Kate Duke; A Porcupine Named Fluffy by Helen Lester, illustrated by Lynn Munsinger; Morris's Disappearing Bag by Rosemary Wells / Storytime Picks: The Whingdingdilly by Bill Peet; Heckedy Peg by Audrey Wood, illustrated by Don Wood
27. Books Read: Farmer Duck by Martin Waddell, illustrated by Helen Oxenbury; I Hear a Noise by Diane Goode; The Fortune-Tellers by Lloyd Alexander, illustrated by Trina Schart Hyman / Storytime Picks: Come for a Ride on the Ghost Train by Colin and Jacqui Hawkins; Make Way for Ducklings by Robert McCloskey
28. Books Read: Noisy Nora by Rosemary Wells; The Seven Chinese Brothers by Margaret Mahy, illustrated by Jean and Mou-Sien Tseng; Effie by Beverley Allinson, illustrations by Barbara Reid / Storytime Picks: Lon Po Po by Ed Young; The Tub People by Pam Conrad, illustrations by Richard Egielski
29. Books Read: The Folks in the Valley by Jim Aylesworth, illustrated by Stefano Vitale; The Banza by Diane Wolkstein, pictures by Marc Brown; Rosie's Baby Tooth by Maryann Macdonald, illustrated by Melissa Sweet / Storytime Picks: Animalia by Graeme Base; Dogger by Shirley Hughes
30. Books Read: Company's Coming by Arthur Yorinks, illustrated by David Small; The Little Red Hen by Paul Galdone; Engelbert the Elephant by Tom Paxton, illustrated by Steven Kellogg / Storytime Picks: The Frog Prince Continued by Jon Scieszka, paintings by Steve Johnson; The True Story of the 3 Little Pigs by Jon Scieszka, illustrated by Lane Smith
31. Books Read: All Pigs Are Beautiful by Dick King-Smith, illustrated by Anita Jeram; The Itsy-Bitsy Spider as told and illustrated by Iza Trapani; Do Not Open by Brinton Turkle / Storytime Picks: Charlie Parker Played Be Bop by Chris Raschka; Pig Pig Grows Up by David McPhail
32. Books Read: The Woman Who Outshone the Sun from a poem by Alejandro Cruz Martinez, pictures by Fernando Olivera; The Art Lesson by Tomie dePaola; Gorilla by Anthony Browne / Storytime Picks: Harold and the Purple Crayon by Crockett Johnson; Arrow to the Sun by Gerald McDermott
33. Books Read: The Adventures of Taxi Dog by Debra and Sal Barracca, pictures by Mark Buehner; Clean Your Room, Harvey Moon! by Pat Cummings; The Baby Blue Cat Who Said No by Ainslie Pryor; Dear Mr. Blueberry by Simon James / Storytime Picks: Millions of Cats by Wanda Gag; Clifford the Big Red Dog by Norman Bridwell
34. Books Read: Maxi, The Hero by Debra and Sal Barracca, pictures by Mark Buehner; Broderick by Edward Ormondroyd, illustrated by John Larrecq; The Doorbell Rang by Pat Hutchins / Storytime Picks: Frederick by Leo Lionni; Anatole by Eve Titus, pictures by Paul Galdone
35. Books Read: The Erie Canal from Sea to Shining Sea; The Mitten adapted and illustrated by Jan Brett; Earl's Too Cool for Me by Leah Komaiko, illustrated by Laura Cornell; Annie Bananie by Leah Komaiko, illustrated by Laura Cornell; Slither McCreep and His Brother, Joe by Tony Johnston, illustrated by Victoria Chess / Storytime Picks: A Day with Wilbur Robinson by William Joyce; Leo the Late Bloomer by Robert Kraus, pictures by Jose Aruego
36. Books Read: My Little Brother by Debi Gliori; Dinner at the Panda Palace by Stephanie Calmenson, illustrated by Nadine Bernard Westcott; Chrysanthemum by Kevin Henkes / Storytime Picks: Train Leaves the Station by Eve Merriam, illustrated by Dale Gottlieb; Now Everybody Really Hates Me by Jane Read Martin and Patricia Marx, illustrated by Roz Chast
37. Books Read: First Pink Light by Eloise Greenfield, illustrated by Jan Spivey Gilchrist; The Cat Who Lost His Purr by Michele Coxon; Goldilocks and the Three Bears retold and illustrated by Jan Brett / Storytime Picks: Cloudy with a Chance of Meatballs by Judi Barrett, illustrated by Ron Barrett; The Biggest Bear by Lynd Ward
38. Books Read: A Big Fat Enormous Lie by Marjorie Weinman Sharmat, illustrated by David McPhail; Super Dooper Jezebel by Tony Ross; Not So Fast, Songololo by Niki Daly
39. Books Read: Ming Lo Moves the Mountain by Arnold Lobel; The Boy and the Ghost by Robert San Souci, illustrated by Brian Pinkney; Life is Fun by Nancy Carlson / Storytime Picks: The Polar Express by Chris Van Allsburg; The Legend of the Bluebonnet by Tomie de Paola
40. Books Read: Princess Smartypants by Babette Cole; "Stand Back," Said the Elephant, "I'm Going to Sneeze!" by Patricia Thomas, pictures by Wallace Tripp; A Special Trade by Sally Wittman, pictures by Karen Gundersheimer / Storytime Picks: Wilfrid Gordon McDonald Partridge by Mem Fox, illustrated by Julie Vivas; The Paper Bag Princess by Robert N. Munsch, art by Michael Martchenko

SPECIAL: Mucky Moose by Jonathan Allen; Alistair's Elephant by Marilyn Sadler, illustrated by Roger Bollen; When I Was Little by Jamie Lee Curtis, illustrated by Laura Cornell

=== Season 2 (1995) ===
1. Books Read: The Three Little Wolves and the Big Bad Pig by Eugene Trivizas, illustrated by Helen Oxenbury; The True Story of the Three Little Pigs by Jon Scieszka, illustrated by Lane Smith / Storytime Picks: Yo, Hungry Wolf! by David Vozar, illustrated by Betsy Lewin; The Three Little Javelinas by Susan Lowell, illustrated by Jim Harris
2. Books Read: Regina's Big Mistake by Marissa Moss; The Empty Pot by Demi; Wind Says Good Night by Katy Rydell, illustrated by David Jorgensen / Storytime Picks: Goodnight Moon by Margaret Wise Brown, pictures by Clement Hurd; K is for Kiss Good Night by Jill Sardegna, pictures by Michael Hays
3. Books Read: Knock, Knock, Teremok! by Katya Arnold; Little Lumpty by Miko Imai; The Grasshopper and the Ants retold by Margaret Wise Brown, illustrated by Larry Moore / Storytime Picks: The Hobyahs by Robert D. San Souci, illustrated by Alexi Natchev; One Hundred Hungry Ants by Elinor J. Pinczes, illustrated by Bonnie MacKain
4. Books Read: Going Home by Margaret Wild, illustrated by Wayne Harris; The Tickleoctopus by Audrey Wood, illustrated by Don Wood; The Grumpalump by Sarah Hayes, illustrated by Barbara Firth
5. Books Read: Subway Sparrow by Leyla Torres; King Bidgood's in the Bathtub by Audrey Wood, illustrated by Don Wood; Ollie Knows Everything by Abby Levine, illustrated by Lynn Munsinger / Storytime Picks: Supergrandpa by David M. Schwartz, illustrated by Bert Dodson; Three Cheers for Tacky by Helen Lester, illustrated by Lynn Munsinger
6. Books Read: A Hat for Minerva Louise by Janet Morgan Stoeke; The Story of a Boy Named Will Who Went Sledding Down the Hill by Daniil Kharms, illustrated by Vladimir Rundunsky; Dogteam by Gary Paulsen, illustrated by Ruth Wright Paulsen; Prize in the Snow by Bill Easterling, illustrated by Mary Beth Owens / Storytime Picks: The Five-Dog Night by Eileen Christelow; Liplap's Wish by Jonathan London, illustrated by Sylvia Long
7. Books Read: Time Train by Paul Fleischman, illustrated by Claire Ewart; Pip's Magic by Ellen Stoll Walsh; Cabbage Rose by M.C. Helldorfer, illustrated by Julie Downing / Storytime Picks: The Wizard by Bill Martin, Jr., illustrated by Alex Schaeffer; Can I Have a Stegosaurus, Mom? Can I? Please!? by Lois G. Grambling, illustrated by H.B. Lewis
8. Books Read: Stop That Pickle! by Peter Armour, illustrated by Andrew Shachat; Swamp Angel by Anne Isaacs, illustrated by Paul O. Zelinsky / Storytime Picks: Catkin by Antonia Barber, illustrated by P.J. Lynch; Harvey Potter's Balloon Farm by Jerdine Nolen, illustrated by Mark Buehner; John Henry by Julius Lester, pictures by Jerry Pinkney
9. Books Read: The Whales' Song by Dyan Sheldon, paintings by Gary Blythe; The Paper Princess by Elisa Kleven; The Big Big Sea by Martin Waddell, illustrated by Jennifer Eachus / Storytime Picks: Wanda's Roses by Pat Brisson, illustrated by Maryann Cocca-Leffler; Our Granny by Margaret Wild, pictures by Julie Vivas
10. Books Read: Sheila Rae, the Brave by Kevin Henkes; The Rat and the Tiger by Keiko Kasza; A House is a House for Me by Mary Ann Hoberman, illustrated by Betty Fraser / Storytime Picks: Mr. Tall and Mr. Small by Barbara Brenner, illustrations by Mike Shenon; A Place for Grace by Jean Davies Okimoto, illustrated by Doug Keith
11. Books Read: Too Many Tamales by Gary Soto, illustrated by Ed Martinez; La Gallinita Roja by Margot Zemach; ¿Donde Esta Mi Osito? by Jez Alborough - Christmas Special
12. Books Read: Flower Garden by Eve Bunting, illustrated by Kathryn Hewitt; When the Fly Flew In... by Lisa Westberg Peters, pictures by Brad Sneed; Nathaniel Willy, Scared Silly by Judith Mathews and Fay Robinson, illustrated by Alexi Natchev / Storytime Picks: Just a Little Bit by Ann Tompert, illustrated by Lynn Munsinger; A Bicycle for Rosaura by Daniel Barbot, illustrated by Morella Fuenmayor
13. Books Read: Would You Rather... by John Burningham; Pigs Aplenty, Pigs Galore! by David McPhail; Boodil My Dog by Pija Lindenbaum / Storytime Picks: Muddigush by Kimberley Knutson; June 29, 1999 by David Wiesner
14. Books Read: Frog Went A-Courtin' by John Langstaff, pictures by Feodor Rojankovsky; Uncle Jed's Barbershop by Margaree King Mitchell, illustrated by James Ransome; Stories to Tell from Meet Danitra Brown by Nikki Grimes, illustrated by Floyd Cooper / Storytime Picks: The Hippopotamus Song: A Muddy Love Story by Michael Flanders and Donald Swann, illustrated by Nadine Bernard Westcott; Aunt Flossie's Hats (and Crab Cakes Later) by Elizabeth Fitzgerald Howard, paintings by James Ransome
15. Books Read: Playing Right Field by Willy Welch, illustrated by Marc Simont; Pug, Slug, and Doug the Thug by Carol Saller, illustrated by Vicki Jo Redenbaugh; Hunting the White Cow by Tres Seymour, pictures by Wendy Anderson Halperin / Storytime Picks: The Field Beyond the Outfield by Mark Teague; The Cowboy and the Black-Eyed Pea by Tony Johnston, illustrated by Warren Ludwig
16. Books Read: Donna O'Neeshuck Was Chased By Some Cows by Bill Grossman, illustrated by Sue Truesdell; Don't Fidget a Feather! by Erica Silverman, illustrated by S.D. Schindler; Nothing at All by Denys Cazet / Storytime Picks: The Most Wonderful Egg in the World by Helme Heine; Easy to See Why by Fred Gwynne
17. Books Read: A Fairy Went A-Marketing by Rose Fyleman, illustrated by Jamichael Henterly; The Man Who Kept His Heart in a Bucket by Sonia Levitin, pictures by Jerry Pinkney; Mole's Hill by Lois Ehlert / Storytime Picks: Kinda Blue by Ann Grifalconi; Rabbit's Good News by Ruth Lercher Bornstein
18. Books Read: Bear by John Schoenherr; The Hunter by Paul Geraghty; It's the Bear! by Jez Alborough
19. Books Read: Hi! by Ann Herbert Scott, illustrated by Glo Coalson; The Shepherd Boy by Kristine Franklin, illustrated by Jill Kastner; Amber on the Mountain by Tony Johnston, paintings by Robert Duncan / Storytime Picks: The Jolly Postman or Other People's Letters by Janet and Allan Ahlberg; Dear Bear by Joanna Harrison
20. Books Read: Owl Eyes by Frieda Gates, illustrated by Yoshi Miyake; Tops and Bottoms adapted and illustrated by Janet Stevens / Storytime Picks: The Royal Nap by Charles C. Black, illustrated by James Stevenson; The Night of the Stars by Douglas Gutierrez and Maria Fernanda Oliver
21. Books Read: Miss Spider's Tea Party by David Kirk; Elvira by Margaret Shannon; Wilson Sat Alone by Debra Hess, illustrated by Diane Greenseid; "We Could Be Friends" by Myra Cohn Livingston from I Like You, If You Like Me: Poems of Friendship / Storytime Picks: A Weekend with Wendell by Kevin Henkes; Matthew and Tilly by Rebecca C. Jones, illustrated by Beth Peck

=== Season 3 (1997) ===
1. Books Read: The House That Drac Built by Judy Sierra, illustrated by Will Hillenbrand; Big Pumpkin by Erica Silverman, illustrated by S.D. Schindler; The Little Old Lady Who Was Not Afraid of Anything by Linda Williams, illustrated by Megan Lloyd; Halloween Howls: Riddles That Are a Scream by Giulio Maestro - Halloween Special
2. Books Read: Is Your Mama a Llama? by Deborah Guarino, illustrated by Steven Kellogg; Storm Boy by Paul Owen Lewis; The Monkey and the Crocodile by Paul Galdone / Storytime Picks: It's Not My Turn to Look for Grandma! by April Halprin Wayland, illustrated by George Booth; The Toll-Bridge Troll by Patricia Rae Wolff, illustrated by Kimberly Bulcken Root
3. Books Read: My Mama Had a Dancing Heart by Libba Moore Gray, illustrated by Raul Colon; Mirette on the High Wire by Emily Arnold McCully; Twist with a Burger, Jitter with a Bug by Linda Lowery, pictures by Pat Dypold / Storytime Picks: Wilma Unlimited by Kathleen Krull, illustrated by David Diaz; Little Bobo by Serena Romanelli, illustrated by Hans de Beer
4. Books Read: Suddenly! by Colin McNaughton; Courtney by John Burningham; The Gullywasher by Joyce Rossi / Storytime Picks: Medio Pollito: Half Chicken by Alma Flor Ada, illustrated by Kim Howard; My Dog Rosie by Isabelle Harper, illustrated by Barry Moser
5. Books Read: Contrary Mary by Anita Jeram; The Perfect Orange by Frank Araujo, PhD, illustrations by Xiao Jun Li; This and That by Julie Sykes, illustrated by Tanya Linch / Storytime Picks: Sam and the Lucky Money by Karen Chinn, illustrated by Cornelius Van Wright and Ying-Hwa Hu; Lucy's Picture by Nicola Moon, pictures by Alex Ayliffe
6. Books Read: Babushka Baba Yaga by Patricia Polacco; The Old Dog by Charlotte Zolotow, paintings by James Ransome; The Painter by Peter Catalanotto / Storytime Picks: A Story, A Story by Gail E. Haley; Booby Hatch by Betsy Lewin
7. Books Read: Jessica by Kevin Henkes; I'm Coming to Get You! by Tony Ross; Listen, Buddy by Helen Lester, illustrated by Lynn Munsinger / Storytime Picks: Custard the Dragon and the Wicked Knight by Ogden Nash, illustrated by Lynn Munsinger; Rebel by John Schoenherr
8. Books Read: Buz by Richard Egielski; A Flea in the Ear by Stephen Wyllie, illustrated by Ken Brown; If... by Sarah Perry; "Hey Bug" by Lilian Moore from Sunflakes: Poems for Children; "Song of the Bugs" by Margaret Wise Brown from Nibble, Nibble: Poems for Children / Storytime Picks: Why Mosquitoes Buzz in People's Ears by Verna Aardema, pictures by Leo and Diane Dillon; Insects Are My Life by Megan McDonald, pictures by Paul Brett Johnson
9. Books Read: The Little Mouse, The Red Ripe Strawberry, and the Big Hungry Bear by Don and Audrey Wood; The Leopard's Drum by Jessica Souhami; Honey Paw and Lightfoot by Jonathan London, illustrated by Jon Van Zyle / Storytime Picks: The Night I Followed the Dog by Nina Laden; Red Fox Running by Eve Bunting, paintings by Wendell Minor
10. Books Read: 'Twas the Night Before Thanksgiving by Dav Pilkey; How Many Days to America? by Eve Bunting, illustrated by Beth Peck; Over the River and Through the Wood by Lydia Maria Child, pictures by Nadine Bernard Westcott / Storytime Picks: Thanksgiving at the Tappletons' by Eileen Spinelli, illustrated by Maryann Cocca-Leffler; Kashtanka by Anton Chekhov, illustrated by Gennady Spirin - Thanksgiving Special
11. Books Read: The Old, Old Man and the Very Little Boy by Kristine Franklin, illustrated by Terea Shaffer; More Than Anything Else by Marie Bradby, pictures by Chris Soentpiet; Knoxville, Tennessee by Nikki Giovanni, illustrated by Larry Johnson / Storytime Picks: Satchmo's Blues by Alan Schroeder, illustrated by Floyd Cooper; Zora Hurston and the Chinaberry Tree by William Miller, illustrated by Cornelius Van Wright and Ying-Hwa Hu
12. Books Read: Lilly's Purple Plastic Purse by Kevin Henkes; Once There Was a Bull... (Frog) by Rick Walton, illustrated by Greg Hally / Storytime Picks: Fanny's Dream by Caralyn Buehner, pictures by Mark Buehner; Dance of the Sacred Circle adapted and illustrated by Kristina Rodanas
13. Books Read: What is the Sun? by Reeve Lindbergh, illustrated by Stephen Lambert; Sally and the Limpet by Simon James; Secret Place by Eve Bunting, pictures by Ted Rand; What a Wonderful World by George David Weiss and Bob Thiele, illustrated by Ashley Bryan / Storytime Picks: Where the Forest Meets the Sea by Jeannie Baker; Earthdance by Joanne Ryder, illustrated by Norman Gorbaty
14. Books Read: Turnip Soup by Lynne Born Myers and Christopher Myers, illustrated by Katie Keller; The Dark at the Top of the Stairs by Sam McBratney, illustrated by Ivan Bates; Night in the Barn by Faye Gibbons, illustrated by Erick Ingraham / Storytime Picks: Under the Moon by Dyan Sheldon, paintings by Gary Blythe; Darkness and the Butterfly by Ann Grifalconi
15. Books Read: Truck Song by Diane Siebert, pictures by Byron Barton; The Ghost of Nicholas Greebe by Tony Johnston, pictures by S.D. Schindler; The Wide-Mouthed Frog by Keith Faulkner, illustrated by Jonathan Lambert / Storytime Picks: The Banshee Train by Odds Bodkin, illustrated by Ted Rose; The Knight Who Was Afraid of the Dark by Barbara Shook Hazen, pictures by Tony Ross
16. Books Read: This is Our House by Michael Rosen, illustrated by Bob Graham; Tacky the Penguin by Helen Lester, illustrated by Lynn Munsinger; The Most Beautiful Kid in the World by Jennifer Ericsson, pictures by Susan Meddaugh; Yo! Yes? by Chris Raschka / Storytime Picks: Metropolitan Cow by Tim Egan; Little Bear Finds a Friend by Hans de Beer
17. Books Read: In the Rain with Baby Duck by Amy Hest, illustrated by Jill Barton; Two Mrs. Gibsons by Toyomi Igus, pictures by Daryl Wells; The Butterfly Seeds by Mary Watson / Storytime Picks: When I Am Old with You by Angela Johnson, pictures by David Soman; Tanya's Reunion by Valerie Flournoy, pictures by Jerry Pinkney
18. Books Read: When I Was Five by Arthur Howard; The Paperboy by Dav Pilkey; The Fiddler of the Northern Lights by Natalie Kinsey-Warnock, illustrated by Leslie Bowman / Storytime Picks: Livingstone Mouse by Pamela Duncan Edwards, illustrated by Henry Cole; Isla by Arthur Dorros, illustrated by Elisa Kleven
19. Books Read: Zin! Zin! Zin! A Violin by Lloyd Moss, illustrated by Marjorie Priceman; The Lion and the Little Red Bird by Elisa Kleven; Outrageous, Bodacious, Boliver Boggs! by Jo Harper, pictures by JoAnn Adinolfi / Storytime Picks: Seeing Stars by Sharleen Collicott; The Flying Dragon Room by Audrey Wood, illustrated by Mark Teague
20. Books Read: Grandma's Cat by Helen Ketteman, illustrated by Marsha Lynn Winborn; The Old Woman Who Named Things by Cynthia Rylant, illustrated by Kathryn Brown; Lost by Paul Brett Johnson and Celeste Lewis, illustrated by Paul Brett Johnson / Storytime Picks: Derek's Dog Days by Nancy Lee Charlton, illustrated by Chris Demarest; The Pet Person by Jeanne Willis, pictures by Tony Ross

== VHS releases ==
#	Title	U.S. Release Date
1	Volume 1	September 14, 1994
2	Volume 2	September 14, 1994
3	Volume 3	September 14, 1994
4	Volume 4	November 29, 1995
5	Volume 5	November 29, 1995
6	Volume 6	November 29, 1995
7	Volume 7	November 29, 1995
8	Volume 8	October 23, 1996
9	Volume 9	October 23, 1996
10	Volume 10	October 23, 1996

== See also ==
Sesame Street
