= Lilly's Purple Plastic Purse =

1996 picture book by Kevin Henkes

Lilly’s Purple Plastic Purse
- Original cover art
- Author: Kevin Henkes
- Illustrator: Kevin Henkes
- Cover artist: Kevin Henkes
- Language: English
- Genre: Children's literature, picture book
- Publisher: Greenwillow Books
- Publication date: 1996
- Publication place: United States of America
- Media type: Hardcover
- Pages: 32
- ISBN: 0688128971
- Preceded by: Good-bye, Curtis
- Followed by: Sun & Spoon

Lilly’s Purple Plastic Purse is a 1996 children's book written and illustrated by Kevin Henkes and published by Greenwillow Books, an imprint of HarperCollins. It was listed as 11th overall in a list of the "Top 100 Picture Books" of all time in a 2012 poll by School Library Journal, and it was included in the literary reference book 1001 Children's Books You Must Read Before You Grow Up. The book is about the titular character, an anthropomorphic mouse, attending school.

== History ==
Lilly, the main character of the story, appeared in several of author Kevin Henkes's stories published before Lilly's Purple Plastic Purse, including Chester's Way (1988) and Julius, the Baby of the World (1990).

== Plot ==
From NPR:

"Lilly loves everything, especially her purple plastic purse full of treasures. She even loves her teacher Mr. Slinger — but when the wondrous purse and its contents keep interrupting his lessons, he confiscates it, leading Lilly to attempt revenge. Luckily, her favorite teacher understands her emotions."

== Reception ==
Reviews have called attention to Henkes's illustrations, with one reviewer calling them, "skilled, playful and spirited".

The book received a positive review from the New York Times: "Every once in a while—and in children's books, it's only once in a very great while—there is a book so delightful, so exuberant, honest and evocative of the passionate life that children live as we look on, that one considers nailing a proclamation to the door of the local bookseller or wearing a copy around one's neck to advertise it. Lilly's Purple Plastic Purse...is just such a book." The review also said, "In all of children's literature there is just a handful of characters we think of as family—Madeline, Winnie the Pooh and Charlotte come to mind—and when this young generation is old enough to reflect on the ones it loved, Lilly will probably lead the pack."

== Adaptations ==
Lilly’s Purple Plastic Purse was adapted for the stage by playwright Kevin Kling and the play has subsequently been produced by numerous local theater companies, including the following:

- Hoboken, New Jersey, Monroe Center for the Arts, 2009
- Columbus, Georgia, Springer Opera House, 2015
- Green Bay, Wisconsin, Weidner Center for Performing Arts, 2016
- Cape Cod, Massachusetts, Harwich Junior Theatre, 2022

== In popular culture ==
- The book was featured in an episode of Kino's Storytime and was read by Geena Davis.

== See also ==
- 1996 in literature
