= Asian/Pacific American Awards for Literature =

Annual literary award

The Asian/Pacific American Awards for Literature (APAAL) are a set of literary awards presented annually by the Asian Pacific American Librarians Association (APALA). The APALA was formed in 1980 "to create an organization that would address the needs of Asian/Pacific American librarians and those who serve Asian/Pacific American communities." The Association was the successor to the Asian American Librarians Caucus (AALC), a discussion group within the American Library Association (ALA) Office for Library Outreach Services that focused on providing library service to minority communities and on supporting minority librarians. The APALA incorporated in 1981 (in Illinois) and became part of the ALA in 1982.

The awards honor literary works about and created by Asian American, Native Hawaiian, and Pasifika (Pacific) experiences and cultures. Categories have included fiction and non-fiction for adults, picture/illustrated books, and children's/young-adult literature. Writers and artists do not need to be of Asian or Pacific Islander ancestry, but they must be U.S. citizens or permanent residents, the books must be about Asian/Pacific American heritage, and must have been written in English and published for general release within the States.

== Winners ==
Asian/Pacific American Awards for Literature
Years	Category	Author	Title	Result	Ref.
2001	Adult Fiction	T. C. Huo	Land of Smiles	Winner	
2001	Adult Nonfiction	Loung Ung	First They Killed My Father	Winner	
2001	Children and Young Adult Literature	Janet S. Wong, illustrated by Bo Jia	The Trip Back Home	Winner	
2001–2003	Adult Fiction	Yann Martel	Life of Pi	Winner	
2001–2003	Picture Book	Janet S. Wong, illustrated by Margaret Chodos-Irvine	Apple Pie 4 July	Winner	
2001–2003	Picture Book	Tim Myer, illustrated by Robert Roth	Tanuki's Gift	Honor	
2001–2003	Picture Book	Yin, illustrated by Chris Soentpiet	Coolies	Honor	
2001–2003	Children and Young Adult Literature	An Na	A Step from Heaven	Winner	
2001–2003	Children and Young Adult Literature	Tanuja Desai Hidier	Born Confused	Honor	
2001–2003	Children and Young Adult Literature	Ken Mochizuki	Beacon Hill Boys	Honor	
2001–2003	Children and Young Adult Literature	Linda Sue Park	A Single Shard	Honor	
2005–2006	Adult Fiction	Chang-Rae Lee	Aloft	Winner	
2005–2006	Adult Fiction	Amy Tan	Saving Fish from Drowning	Honor	
2005–2006	Adult Fiction	Lisa See	Snow Flower and the Secret Fan	Honor	
2005–2006	Picture Book	Linda Sue Park, illustrated by Julie Downing	The Firekeeper's Son	Winner	
2005–2006	Picture Book	Paula Yoo, illustrated by Dom Lee	Sixteen Years in Sixteen Seconds: The Sammy Lee Story	Honor	
2005–2006	Picture Book	Frederick Lipp, illustrated by Jason Gaillard	Bread Song	Honor	
2005–2006	Youth Literature	Cynthia Kadohata	Kira-Kira	Winner	
2005–2006	Youth Literature	Andrea Cheng	Shanghai Messenger	Honor	
2005–2006	Youth Literature	Linda Sue Park	Project Mulberry	Honor	
2006–2007	Adult Fiction	Da Chen	Brothers	Winner	
2006–2007	Adult Fiction	John Hamamura	Color of the Sea	Honor	
2006–2007	Picture Book	Anne Sibley O'Brien	The Legend of Hong Kil Dong: The Robin Hood of Korea	Winner	
2006–2007	Picture Book	Yin, illustrated by Chris Soentpiet	Brothers	Honor	
2006–2007	Youth Literature	Justina Chen Headley	Nothing But the Truth	Winner	
2006–2007	Youth Literature	Grace Lin	Year of the Dog	Honor	
2007–2008	Adult Nonfiction	Jean Pfaelzer	Driven Out: The Forgotten War Against Chinese Americans	Winner	
2007–2008	Adult Nonfiction	Linda Furiya	Bento Box in The Heartland: My Japanese Girlhood in Whitebread America	Honor	
2007–2008	Picture Book	Ellie Crowe, illustrated by Richard Waldrep	Surfer of the Century	Winner	
2007–2008	Picture Book	Lynne Barasch	Hiromi's Hands	Honor	
2007–2008	Youth Literature	Kelly Easton	Hiroshima Dreams	Winner	
2007–2008	Youth Literature	Kashmira Sheth	Keeping Corner	Honor	
2008–2009	Adult Fiction	Jhumpa Lahiri	Unaccustomed Earth	Winner	
2008–2009	Adult Fiction	Fae Myenne Ng	Steer Toward Rock	Honor	
2008–2009	Adult Nonfiction	Jennifer 8. Lee	The Fortune Cookie Chronicles: Adventures in the World of Chinese Food	Winner	
2008–2009	Adult Nonfiction	Andrew X. Pham	Eaves of Heaven: A Life in Three Wars	Honor	
2008–2009	Adult Nonfiction	Kao Kalia Yang	The Latehomecomer: A Hmong Family Memoir	Honor	
2008–2009	Picture Book	Mark Reibstein, illustrated by Ed Young	Wabi Sabi	Winner	
2008–2009	Picture Book	Kashmira Sheth, illustrated by Yoshiko Jaeggi	Monsoon Afternoon	Honor	
2008–2009	Youth Literature	Many Ly	Roots and Wings	Winner	
2008–2009	Youth Literature	Naomi Hirahara	1001 Cranes	Honor	
2008–2009	Youth Literature	Paula Yoo	Good Enough	Honor	
2009–2010	Adult Fiction	Jamie Ford	Hotel on the Corner of Bitter and Sweet	Winner	
2009–2010	Adult Fiction	Lisa See	Shanghai Girls	Honor	
2009–2010	Adult Nonfiction	Bonnie Tsui	American Chinatown: A People's History of Five Neighborhoods	Winner	
2009–2010	Adult Nonfiction	Lane Ryo Hirabayashi	Japanese American Resettlement: Through the Lens	Honor	
2009–2010	Picture Book	Dorina K. Lazo Gilmore, illustrated by Kristi Valiant	Cora Cooks Pancit	Winner	
2009–2010	Picture Book	Malathi Michelle Iyengar, illustrated by Jamel Akib	Tan to Tamarind	Honor	
2009–2010	Youth Literature	Sung Woo	Everything Asian	Winner	
2009–2010	Youth Literature	Ching Yeung Russell	Tofu Quilt	Honor	
2010–2011	Adult Fiction	Karen Tei Yamashita	I Hotel	Winner	
2010–2011	Adult Fiction	Monique Truong	Bitter in the Mouth	Honor	
2010–2011	Adult Nonfiction	Erika Lee and Judy Yung	Angel Island: Immigration Gateway to America	Winner	
2010–2011	Adult Nonfiction	Yunte Huang	Charlie Chan: The Untold Story of the Honorable Detective and His Rendezvous with American History	Honor	
2010–2011	Adult Nonfiction	Neela Vaswani	You Have Given Me a Country	Honor	
2010–2011	Children's Literature	Margi Preus	Heart of a Samurai	Winner	
2010–2011	Children's Literature	Mitali Perkins	Bamboo People	Honor	
2010–2011	Picture Book	Ann Malaspina, illustrated by Doug Chayka	Yasmin's Hammer	Winner	
2010–2011	Picture Book	Roseanne Thong, illustrated by Eujin Kim Neilan	Fly Free	Honor	
2010–2011	Young Adult Literature	N. H. Senzai	Shooting Kabul	Winner	
2010–2011	Young Adult Literature	Barbara Bazaldua	A Boy of Heart Mountain	Honor	
2011–2012	Adult Fiction	Amy Waldman	The Submission	Winner	
2011–2012	Adult Fiction	R. Zamora Linmark	Leche	Honor	
2011–2012	Adult Nonfiction	Ying-Ying Chang	The Woman Who Could Not Forget: Iris Chang Before and Beyond The Rape of Nanking	Winner	
2011–2012	Adult Nonfiction	Shafiqur Rahman	The Bangladeshi Diaspora in the United States after 9/11: From Obscurity to High Visibility	Honor	
2011–2012	Children's Literature	Wendy Wan-Long Shang	The Great Wall of Lucy Wu	Winner	
2011–2012	Children's Literature	Sheela Chari	Vanished	Honor	
2011–2012	Picture Book	Ed Young	The House Baba Built: An Artist's Childhood in China	Winner	
2011–2012	Picture Book	F. Zia, illustrated by Ken Min	Hot Hot Roti for Kaka-ji	Honor	
2011–2012	Young Adult Literature	Holly Thompson	Orchards	Winner	
2011–2012	Young Adult Literature	Gene Luen Yang	Level Up	Honor	
2012–2013	Adult Fiction	Don Lee	The Collective	Winner	
2012–2013	Adult Fiction	Krys Lee	Drifting House	Honor	
2012–2013	Adult Nonfiction	Rick Baldoz	Third Asiatic Invasion: Empire and Migration in Filipino America, 1898-1946	Winner	
2012–2013	Adult Nonfiction	Martin B. Gold	Forbidden Citizens	Honor	
2012–2013	Children's Literature	Hildi Kang	Chengli and the Silk Road Caravan	Winner	
2012–2013	Children's Literature	R. Kikuo Johnson	Shark King	Honor	
2012–2013	Picture Book	Joan Schoettler, illustrated by Jessica Lanan	Good Fortune in a Wrapping Cloth	Winner	
2012–2013	Picture Book	Anne O'Brien Sibley	A Path of Stars	Honor	
2012–2013	Young Adult Literature	Keshni Kashyap	Tina's Mouth: An Existential Comic Diary	Winner	
2012–2013	Young Adult Literature	Ryan Inzana	Ichiro	Honor	
2013–2014	Adult Fiction	Ruth Ozeki	A Tale for the Time Being	Winner	
2013–2014	Adult Fiction	Jennifer Cody Epstein	The Gods of Heavenly Punishment	Honor	
2013–2014	Adult Nonfiction	Cindy I-Fen Cheng	Citizens of Asian America: Democracy and Race during the Cold War	Winner	
2013–2014	Adult Nonfiction	Cecilia M. Tsu	Garden of the World: Asian Immigrants and the Making of Agriculture in California's Santa Clara Valley	Honor	
2013–2014	Children's Literature	Cynthia Kadohata, illustrated by Julia Kuo	The Thing About Luck	Winner	
2013–2014	Children's Literature	Josanne La Valley	The Vine Basket	Honor	
2013–2014	Picture Book	Ji-li Jiang	Red Kite, Blue Kite	Winner	
2013–2014	Picture Book	Marissa Moss, illustrated by Yuko Shimizu	Barbed Wire Baseball	Honor	
2013–2014	Young Adult Literature	Leza Lowitz and Shogo Oketani	Jet Black and the Ninja Wind	Winner	
2013–2014	Young Adult Literature	Suzanne Kamata	Gadget Girl: The Art of Being Invisible	Honor	
2014–2015	Adult Fiction	Celeste Ng	Everything I Never Told You	Winner	
2014–2015	Adult Fiction	Mira Jacob	The Sleepwalker's Guide to Dancing	Honor	
2014–2015	Adult Nonfiction	Robert Ji-Song Ku	Dubious Gastronomy: The Cultural Politics of Eating Asian in the USA	Winner	
2014–2015	Adult Nonfiction	Alex Tizon	Big Little Man: In Search of My Asian Self written	Honor	
2014–2015	Children's Literature	Matt Faulkner	Gaijin: American Prisoner of War	Winner	
2014–2015	Children's Literature	Kristie Hammond	Ting Ting	Honor	
2014–2015	Picture Book	Chieri Uegaki and Qin Leng	Hana Hashimoto, Sixth Violin	Winner	
2014–2015	Picture Book	Rich Lo	Father's Chinese Opera	Honor	
2014–2015	Young Adult Literature	May-lee Chai	Tiger Girl	Winner	
2014–2015	Young Adult Literature	Gene Luen Yang, illustrated by Sonny Liew	Shadow Hero	Honor	
2015–2016	Adult Fiction	Viet Thanh Nguyen	The Sympathizer	Winner	
2015–2016	Adult Fiction	Sandip Roy	Don't Let Him Know	Honor	
2015–2016	Adult Nonfiction	Erika Lee	The Making of Asian America: a History	Winner	
2015–2016	Adult Nonfiction	Haiming Liu	From Canton Restaurant to Panda Express: A History of Chinese Food in the United States	Honor	
2015–2016	Adult Nonfiction	Madeline Y. Hsu	The Good Immigrant: How the Yellow Peril Became the Model Minority	Honor	
2015–2016	Children's Literature	Marilyn Hilton	Full Cicada Moon	Winner	
2015–2016	Children's Literature	Erin Entrada Kelly	Blackbird Fly	Honor	
2015–2016	Picture Book	Jane Bahk	Juna's Jar	Winner	
2015–2016	Picture Book	Margarita Engle, illustrated by Rafael Lopez	Drum Dream Girl: How One Girl's Courage Changed Music	Honor	
2015–2016	Young Adult Literature	Jenny Han	P.S. I Still Love You	Winner	
2015–2016	Young Adult Literature	Valynne E. Maetani	Ink and Ashes	Honor	
2016–2017	Adult Fiction	Vanessa Hua	Deceit and Other Possibilities	Winner	
2016–2017	Adult Fiction	Peter Ho Davies	The Fortunes	Honor	
2016–2017	Adult Nonfiction	Barbara Kawakami	Picture Bride: Stories	Winner	
2016–2017	Adult Nonfiction	Mas Masumoto and Nikiko Masumoto	Changing Season: A Father, A Daughter, A Family Farm	Honor	
2016–2017	Children's Literature	Erin Entrada Kelly	The Land of Forgotten Girls	Winner	
2016–2017	Children's Literature	Margaret Dilloway	Momotaro Xander and the Lost Island of Monsters	Honor	
2016–2017	Picture Book	Hyewon Yum	Puddle	Winner	
2016–2017	Young Adult Literature	Stacey Lee	Outrun the Moon	Winner	
2016–2017	Young Adult Literature	Marina Budhos	Watched	Honor	
2017–2018	Adult Fiction	Lisa Ko	The Leavers	Winner	
2017–2018	Adult Fiction	Viet Thanh Nguyen	The Refugees	Honor	
2017–2018	Adult Nonfiction	Eleanor Ty	Asianfail: Narratives of Disenchantment and the Model Minority	Winner	
2017–2018	Adult Nonfiction	Karen M. Inouye	The Long Afterlife of Nikkei Wartime Incarceration	Honor	
2017–2018	Children's Literature	Uma Krishnaswami	Step Up to the Plate, Maria Singh	Winner	
2017–2018	Children's Literature	Susan Tan, illustrated by Dana Wulfekotte	Cilla Lee-Jenkins: Future Author Extraordinaire	Honor	
2017–2018	Picture Book	Bao Phi, illustrated by Thi Bui	A Different Pond	Winner	
2017–2018	Picture Book	Andrea Wang, illustrated by Alina Chau	The Nian Monster	Honor	
2017–2018	Young Adult Literature	Misa Sugiura	It's Not Like It's A Secret	Winner	
2017–2018	Young Adult Literature	S.K. Ali	Saints & Misfits	Honor	
2018–2019	Adult Fiction	Thirii Myo Kyaw Myint	The End of Peril, The End of Enmity, The End of Strife, A Haven	Winner	
2018–2019	Adult Fiction	YZ Chin	Though I Get Home	Honor	
2018–2019	Adult Nonfiction	Sharmila Sen	Not Quite Not White: Losing and Finding Race in America	Winner	
2018–2019	Adult Nonfiction	Mary-Kim Arnold	Litany for the Long Moment	Honor	
2018–2019	Children's Literature	Kelly Yang	Front Desk	Winner	
2018–2019	Children's Literature	Mae Respicio	The House that Lou Built	Honor	
2018–2019	Picture Book	Minh Lê, illustrated by Dan Santat	Drawn Together	Winner	
2018–2019	Picture Book	Betty Quan, illustrated by Carmen Mok	Grandmother's Visit	Honor	
2018–2019	Young Adult Literature	Adib Khorram	Darius the Great is Not Okay	Winner	
2018–2019	Young Adult Literature	Emily X.R. Pan	The Astonishing Color of After	Honor	
2019–2020	Adult Fiction	Devi Laskar	The Atlas of Reds and Blues	Winner	
2019–2020	Adult Fiction	Ocean Vuong	On Earth We're Briefly Gorgeous	Honor	
2019–2020	Adult Non-Fiction	Gordon H. Chang	Ghosts of Gold Mountain: The Epic Story of the Chinese Who Built the Transcontinental Railroad	Winner	
2019–2020	Adult Non-Fiction	Ann Hui	Chop Suey Nation	Honor	
2019–2020	Children's Literature	Jen Wang	Stargazing	Winner	
2019–2020	Children's Literature	Patti Kim	I'm Ok	Honor	
2019–2020	Picture Book	Teresa Robeson illustrated by Rebecca Huang	Queen of Physics: How Wu Chien Shiung Helped Unlock the Secrets of the Atom	Winner	
2019–2020	Picture Book	Aisha Saeed illustrated by Anoosha Syed	Bilal Cooks Daal	Honor	
2019–2020	Young Adult Literature	George Takei, Justin Eisinger and Steven Scott	They Called Us Enemy	Winner	
2019–2020	Young Adult Literature	David Yoon	Frankly in Love	Honor	
2020–2021	Adult Fiction	C Pam Zhang	How Much of These Hills is Gold: A Novel	Winner	
2020–2021	Adult Fiction	Souvankham Thammavongsa	How To Pronounce Knife	Honor	
2020–2021	Adult Nonfiction	Erika Lee	America for Americans: A History of Xenophobia in the United States	Winner	
2020–2021	Adult Nonfiction	Arthur Dong	Hollywood Chinese: The Chinese in American Feature Films	Honor	
2020–2021	Youth Literature	Andrew Fukuda	The Light Between Us	Winner	
2020–2021	Youth Literature	Kiku Hughes	Displacement	Honor	
2020–2021	Children's Literature	Tae Keller	When You Trap a Tiger	Winner	
2020–2021	Children's Literature	Linda Sue Park	Prairie Lotus	Honor	
2020–2021	Picture Book	Julie Leung, illustrated by Chris Sasaki	Paper Son: The Inspiring Story of Tyrus Wong, Immigrant and Artist	Winner	
2020–2021	Picture Book	Anna Kim	Danbi Leads the School Parade	Honor	
2021–2022	Adult Fiction	Hiromi Goto, illustrated by Ann Xu	Shadow Life	Winner	
2021–2022	Adult Fiction	Anthony Veasna So	Afterparties	Honor	
2021–2022	Adult Nonfiction	Grace M. Cho	Tastes Like War: A Memoir	Winner	
2021–2022	Adult Nonfiction	Judy Y. Kawamoto	Forced Out: A Nikkei Woman's Search for a Home in America	Honor	
2021–2022	Youth Literature	Malinda Lo	Last Night at the Telegraph Club	Winner	
2021–2022	Youth Literature	Traci Chee	We are Not Free	Honor	
2021–2022	Children's Literature	Hena Khan	Amina's Song	Winner	
2021–2022	Children's Literature	Ellen Oh	Finding Junie Kim	Honor	
2021–2022	Picture Book	Andrea Wang, illustrated by Jason Chin	Watercress	Winner	
2021–2022	Picture Book	James Yang	A Boy Named Isamu: A Story of Isamu Noguchi	Honor	
2022–2023	Adult Fiction	Dur E Aziz Amna	American Fever	Winner	
2022–2023	Adult Fiction	Joseph Han	Nuclear Family	Honor	
2022–2023	Adult Nonfiction	Jay Caspian Kang	The Loneliest Americans	Winner	
2022–2023	Adult Nonfiction	Qian Julie Wang	Beautiful Country	Honor	
2022–2023	Young Adult Literature	Harmony Becker	Himawari House	Winner	
2022–2023	Young Adult Literature	Joanna Ho	The Silence that Binds Us	Honor	
2022–2023	Children's Literature	Lisa Yee	Maizy Chen's Last Chance	Winner	
2022–2023	Children's Literature	John Cho and Sarah Suk	Troublemaker	Honor	
2022–2023	Picture Book	Kao Kalia Yang, illustrated by Rachel Wada	From the Tops of the Trees	Winner	
2022–2023	Picture Book	Liza Ferneyhough	Nana, Nenek & Nina	Honor	
2023–2024	Adult Fiction	Janika Oza	A History of Burning	Winner	
2023–2024	Adult Fiction	Gina Chung	Sea Change	Honor	
2023–2024	Adult Nonfiction	Alice Wong	Year of the Tiger: An Activist's Life	Winner	
2023–2024	Adult Nonfiction	Thenmozhi Soundrararajan	The Trauma of Caste: A Dalit Feminist Meditation on Survivorship, Healing, and Abolition	Honor	
2023–2024	Young Adult Literature	Shannon C. F. Rogers	I'd Rather Burn Than Bloom	Winner	
2023–2024	Young Adult Literature	Deb JJ Lee	In Limbo	Honor	
2023–2024	Children's Literature	Christina Li	Ruby Lost and Found	Winner	
2023–2024	Children's Literature	Betty C. Tang	Parachute Kids: A Graphic Novel	Honor	
2023–2024	Picture Book	Julie Leung, illustrated by Hanna Cha	The Truth About Dragons	Winner	
2023–2024	Picture Book	Angela Pham Krans, illustrated by Thi Bui	Finding Papa	Honor	
2024-2025	Adult Fiction	Ed Park	Same Bed Different Dreams	Winner	
2024-2025	Adult Fiction	Gina Chung	Green Frog: Stories	Honor	
2024-2025	Adult Nonfiction	Drew Afualo	Loud: Accept Nothing Less Than the Life You Deserve	Winner	
2024-2025	Adult Nonfiction	Alfred Perado Flores	Tip of the Spear: Land, Labor, and US Settler Militarism in Guåhan, 1944–1962	Honor	
2024-2025	Adult Nonfiction	Eddie Ahn	Advocate: A Graphic Memoir of Family, Community, and the Fight for Environmental Justice	Honor	
2024-2025	Young Adult Literature	Randy Ribay	Everything We Never Had	Winner	
2024-2025	Young Adult Literature	Gene Luen Yang, illustrated by LeUyen Pham	Lunar New Year Love Story	Honor	
2024-2025	Young Adult Literature	Makiia Lucier	Dragonfruit	Honor	
2024-2025	Children's Literature	Kathy MacLeod	Continental Drifter	Winner	
2024-2025	Children's Literature	Zachary Sterling	Mabuhay!	Honor	
2024-2025	Children's Literature	Kristiana Kahakauwila	Clairboyance	Honor	
2024-2025	Picture Book	Kaylin Melia George, illustrated by Mae Waite	Aloha Everything	Winner	
2024-2025	Picture Book	Kao Kalia Yang, illustrated by Jiemei Lin	The Rock in My Throat	Honor	
