= Korean American children's literature =

Korean American children's literature has often been included in the study of the broader Asian American children's literature category. There are varying definitions of “Korean American children’s literature,” as this is a category that has been written by both non-Koreans and Korean Americans as well as by Koreans and Korean Americans. Scholars have outlined two main criteria to categorize these books. These include the presence of at least one Korean American or Korean character, and the identification of the author as a resident of the United States (and consequently the use of English). This category represents a variety of Korean American experiences, including immigration to the United States, misrepresentation, interracial Korean adoption narratives, and multiracial Korean American children's narratives. Since the 1970s, numerous authors have contributed to the genre of Korean American children's literature.

== History ==
The first instances of Korean American children's literature can be traced back to the 1970s and 1980s. In 1976, The Council on Interracial Books for Children (CIBC) formed the Asian American Children's Book Project and conducted a review on Asian American themes currently found in children's books at that time. There was a total of 66 books reviewed, but only two were categorized as Korean American: a picture book titled Chinese Eyes written by Marjorie Wayhill and a young adult fiction book titled Understanding Kim written by Pelagie Doane. Chinese Eyes was published in 1974, but it has been labeled as one of the “most racist children book I have ever read” by reviewers.

As a result, other scholars have identified Ae Kyung’s Dream, written by Min Paek in 1988, as the first Korean American picture book. This story follows a female protagonist who initially faces difficulty adjusting to her new life in America but begins to speak well after dreaming about King Sejong, who is credited for inventing the Korean Alphabet, hangul. Since then, many more works have been published under the genre of Korean American children's literature.

== Characteristics and common themes ==
=== Immigration ===
A large part of children's literature relating to Korean Americans in the United States centers around the immigrant experience. Some of the common themes explored in these picture books include language conflict, name selection, language mediators, family values, and life after immigration. A study conducted in 2016 by Kwon and Graff explored the responses of mothers to various children's pictures featuring the Korean immigrant experience and revealed that books that conveyed the Korean culture and its indicators of success as well as the Korean identity were the most likely to be well received by Korean parents. On the other hand, books that offered an inaccurate representation of Koreans and Korean Americans (through exaggerated illustrations of the Korean skin color) were not as well liked by the parents in this study.

=== Cultural authenticity ===
Scholars Yoo-Lee et al. define cultural authenticity as “the absence of stereotypes but also the presence of values consistent with a particular culture and the accuracy of cultural details in text and illustrations.” There are varying degrees in the accuracy of representations of Korean and Korean American culture in children's literature. For example, a study conducted in 2015 analyzed 33 children's books that were published in the United States and included an aspect of Korean culture and found that these picture books served as a window into Korean culture and often portrayed narratives of immigrant and adopted children. Additionally, the researchers in this study found that while younger children were depicted accurately in the illustrations, older Koreans were often drawn in an inaccurate and stereotypical manner. Common elements mentioned in these books included Korean traditional clothing, food (with kimchi being the dish that appeared most frequently), and holidays.

The use of the Korean and English languages is also a central part to the cultural authenticity of Korean American children's literature. One example of a book that authentically incorporates the Korean language into the plot is Juna’s Jar (written by Jane Bahk), where the protagonist refers to her family members using honorific titles, as is the custom of Korean culture. Other books (e.g. Chef Roy Choi and the Street Food Remix, written by Jacqueline Briggs Martin and June Jo Lee) feature accurate illustrations of signs written in Korean that one would expect to see in local Korean American communities.

=== Transracial Korean adoption narratives ===
The end of the Korean War in the 1950s eventually led to the establishment of the first international adoption agencies, where many Korean adoptees were sent to the United States. Within Asian American picture books, about 15% of the major themes refer to adoption. In 2021, Yi analyzed and cataloged a total of 33 Asian American books that featured the stories of transnational Asian adoptees, and highlighted The Night the Angel Came by Sharilyn Martin, which features the candid narrative of a young Korean girl adopted into the United States.

=== Multiracial Korean American children's narratives ===
There have also been various portrayals of multiracial Korean American children in picture books. A study conducted in 2021 explored multiracial Asian American representation in nineteen picture books and found common themes of issues surrounding cultural and racial identity because of language difficulties. According to Wee et al., picture books about multiracial children can “help them reflect upon and affirm their experiences and consolidate their identity.” Within this field, physical appearance and language proficiency often cause the protagonists to reevaluate their racial identities, as is the case in Cooper’s Lesson, written by Sun Yung Shin.

== Visibility of Korean American children’s literature ==
Author Linda Sue Park was the first Korean American to be awarded the 2002 Newbery Medal for her 2001 novel A Single Shard. Since then, many other Korean American authors have been recognized for their work. Author Jane Bahk received the Asian/Pacific American Award for Literature for her picture book, ‘’Juna's Jar’’, in 2016. Author Ellen Oh was the 2022 Children's Literature Winner of the Asian/Pacific American Award for Literature for her book Finding Junie Kim. Anna Kim was the winner of the 2021 Picture Book award for her book Danbi Leads the School Parade, and Tae Keller was the winner of the 2021 Picture Book Honor award as well as the 2021 Newbery Medal for her book When You Trap A Tiger. Linda Sue Park was also the winner of the 2021 Children's Literature award for her book Prairie Lotus.

== List of Korean American children's literature authors ==
- Jane Bahk
- Sook Nyul Choi
- Yangsook Choi
- Tae Keller
- Anna Kim
- Ellen Oh
- Min Paek
- Soyung Pak
- Linda Sue Park
- Sun Yung Shin
