= Sea Change (Chung novel) =

2023 debut novel by Gina Chung

- Author: Gina Chung
- Genre: Literary fiction, speculative fiction
- Publisher: Vintage
- Publication date: March 28, 2023
- Pages: 288
- ISBN: 978-0593469347
- Followed by: Green Frog: Stories

Sea Change is a 2023 debut novel by American writer Gina Chung, published by Vintage.

== Synopsis ==
The novel follows a Korean American woman, Ro, who works at an aquarium. As a teenager, Ro lost her father, a marine biologist, when he disappeared suddenly on the water, and the grief still lingers with her. Now, at her job, Ro is friends with a giant Pacific octopus named Dolores, but things change when Dolores is about to be sold off to another aquarium.

== Background ==
The daughter of Korean immigrants, Chung was born in Queens but grew up in New Jersey where there was a Korean American community nearby, though she lived in a predominantly white part of the area. In Electric Literature, Chung stated that the "cultural whiplash" of oscillating between the two aforementioned communities was an "enduring preoccupation" in her fiction, including in Sea Change, a novel with a Korean American woman protagonist.

Chung first started the novel when she wrote about Dolores during a writing exercise at The New School MFA program. Wondering who Dolores was, Chung decided that she was an octopus. Chung then wrote the first draft of the book in three months, during the COVID-19 pandemic in 2020, as her thesis.

== Critical reception ==
The book was longlisted for the Center for Fiction First Novel Prize. Barnes & Noble selected it as a Discover Pick, and it was designated an Asian Pacific American Librarians Association Adult Fiction Honor Book.

Kirkus Reviews called the book "A debut novel of change, community, and cephalopods."

Many critics appreciated Chung's balance between literary fiction and the more speculative elements of her novel. Newcity Lit said that "Despite these futuristic elements, Sea Change reads very much like a novel of today, as Ro, a child of Korean immigrants, struggles to find her footing in adult life." The Masters Review concluded that "The novel raises a few pertinent questions about human responsibility to the environment".

Critics pointed out Chung's skillful writing of her protagonist, Ro. The Georgia Review stated that "Ro makes for a fascinating narrator. Her inner turmoil and penchant for self-destruction is reminiscent of the defiant female protagonists in TV shows like Fleabag and Insecure, but Chung breathes life into these themes of adult coming-of-age through her glittering prose and focus on intergenerational trauma." Washington Square Review commended that "Ro's decisions to change her life, as the women around her change theirs, are rooted in the forgiveness and support of her community." Stinging Fly argued that "Chung's novel is at its strongest when it allows Ro's self-destructive impulses room to breathe, dramatising the ways in which loss and dysfunction at a young age can impact later life."

Some critics were mixed on the book's structure. The Soapberry Review opined that a "structural limitation" of the book was that "Because the narrative weaves in and out of time so much, it can be difficult to remember where exactly you are." Similarly, The Big Issue said that "As is already obvious, Sea Change simply just tries to do too much in its 288 pages. Chung's prose cannot be faulted, she is often wry and funny, but the novel is just too busy, to the point where it seems even the book itself forgets its own plots, the one about her boyfriend going to Mars only appearing seemingly when the author herself remembers it."
