= May-lee Chai =

American author

May-lee Chai is an American author of fiction and nonfiction. She is also currently a professor of creative writing at San Francisco State University.

== Publications ==
=== Novels ===
Her novels include My Lucky Face (1997), about a Chinese woman in Nanjing balancing work, family, and a tough new job assignment taking care of a foreign teacher; Dragon Chica (2010), about Cambodian survivors of the Khmer Rouge starting over in Texas and Nebraska; and its sequel, Tiger Girl (2013). For Tiger Girl, Chai won the 2014 Asian/Pacific American Award for Literature for Best Young Novel from the Asian/Pacific American Librarians Association (APALA).

Chai has also written a novella entitled Training Days as part of the Gemma Media Open Door Series intended to promote adult literacy; namely, the sentences in the book fall between a score of 2–4 on the Flesch-Kincaid scale for readability, a level considered ideal for ESL students and adult-aged learners of English literacy.

=== Nonfiction books ===
Her nonfiction books include the family memoir, The Girl from Purple Mountain (2002), which was co-written with her father, the political scientist Winberg Chai. The book, which is narrated in alternating chapters by May-lee and her father, details her grandmother's decision to be buried alone after helping her family to escape to America after the Sino-Japanese War and Chinese Civil War. Scholar Rocio G. Davis has noted that the metaliterary interaction of the dual father-daughter narrators and their arguments about the past in The Girl from Purple Mountain becomes a theme in the memoir, exploring the complex reasons related to trauma, memory, and the passage of time that events and stories are experienced and remembered differently by various members within a family.

Chai's other memoir, Hapa Girl (2007), explores violent reactions towards her mixed-race family in a small Midwestern town in the 1980s. Chai's writing in Hapa Girl has also been noted for its use of culinary metaphors as part of an Asian American narrative about food and identity. For Hapa Girl, Chai received the 2008 Notable Book Kiriyama Prize and an Honorable Mention from the Gustavus Myers Center for the Study of Bigotry and Human Rights.

Chai also co-authored (with her father Winberg Chai) a book about changes in contemporary Chinese society, China A to Z (2014, 2nd Ed.), and translated the 1934 autobiography of Chinese author, Ba Jin (2008).

Chai is the author of a collection of essays, My Hungry Ghosts: Essays & Incantations (2026).

=== Short stories and essays ===
Chai's short stories and essays have appeared in numerous publications, including The San Francisco Chronicle, Christian Science Monitor, Dallas Morning News, The Denver Post, Gulf Coast, Glimmer Train, Jakarta Post Weekender, Many Mountains Moving, The Missouri Review, North American Review, Seventeen, Southwest: The Magazine, The Bedford Introduction to Literature, At Our Core: Women Writing on Power, Approaching Literature: Reading, Thinking, and Writing, Entropy, The Rumpus, The Offing, Catapult, Crab Orchard Review, Prairie Schooner, The Grist: A Journal of the Literary Arts, Queen Mob's Tea House and ZYZZYVA.

Chai has also published a collection of short stories called Useful Phrases for Immigrants: Stories (2018), winner of the 2018 Bakwin Award for Writing by a Woman, from Blair, a nonprofit press based in Durham, North Carolina. The 2018 Bakwin Award was also chosen out of 233 entries to be published in Blair by Tayari Jones, who stated: "The eight stories in this collection contain multitudes. May-lee Chai interrogates heavy subjects with a light touch. She grants each character the gift of a gleaming voice, rendering them as shaped by circumstances, while also transcending them. Useful Phrases for Immigrants is more than merely 'useful'; this is essential reading, and I'm honored to choose this book for the Bakwin Award."

Useful Phrases for Immigrants also won an American Book Award in 2019. She gave an award acceptance speech at the San Francisco Public Library, which is viewable online at C-SPAN.

Chai's collection Useful Phrases for Immigrants has also been positively reviewed and featured on The Washington Post, Booklist, Foreword Reviews, Kirkus Reviews, Publishers Weekly, Shelf Awareness, Entertainment Weekly, Elle, The Millions, Electric Literature, Bustle, and the Cleveland Scene.

Among the stories in the Useful Phrases for Immigrants collection, the short story "Fish Boy" won the Jack Dyer Prize in Fiction from the Crab Orchard Review and the title story, "Useful Phrases for Immigrants" (originally published in The Grist: A Journal of The Literary Arts) was a nominee for a 2018 Pushcart Prize.

Several of Chai's other short stories (along with two essays, "Glamorous Asians" and "Yellow Peril"), which are studied in many high school and college literature courses across the nation, are collected in the book Glamorous Asians (2004).

Chai published another collection of short stories, Tomorrow in Shanghai and Other Stories in 2022 from Blair. Tomorrow in Shanghai was a New York Times Book Review Editors’ Choice and was longlisted for The Story Prize.

Her essays have also won a variety of accolades. Specifically, her essay "The Imagined Homeland" (2018), originally published in the Sonora Review won that review's Essay Prize, her essay "The Blue Boot" (2013), originally published in The Missouri Review, was named a Notable Essay of 2012 in Best American Essays 2013, edited by Cheryl Strayed and was a Jeffrey E. Smith Editors' Prize Finalist in The Missouri Review as well, and her essay "Lilacs" (2018), originally published in Prairie Schooner, won the Virginia Faulkner Award for Excellence in Writing from Prairie Schooner

== Education ==
1989 – B.A. majoring in French and Chinese Studies from Grinnell College

1992 – M.A. in East Asian Studies from Yale University

1994 – M.A. in English-Creative Writing from the University of Colorado-Boulder

2013 – M.F.A. from San Francisco State University

== Awards and honors ==
Useful Phrases for Immigrants - 2019 American Book Award

Useful Phrases for Immigrants - 2018 Bakwin Award, judged by Tayari Jones (beating out 233 entries to be published by the independent press Blair)

Tiger Girl – 2014 Asian/Pacific American Award for Literature for Best Young Novel from the Asian/Pacific American Librarians Association (APALA)

Hapa Girl – 2008 Kiriyama Prize Notable Book

Hapa Girl – Honorable Mention from the Gustavus Myers Center for the Study of Bigotry and Human Rights

"The Imagined Homeland" (Essay) - Sonora Review Essay Prize

"The Blue Boot" (Essay) - Named a Notable Essay of 2012 in Best American Essays 2013, edited by Cheryl Strayed

"Lilacs" (2018) - Winner, Virginia Faulkner Award for Excellence in Writing from Prairie Schooner

"Fish Boy" (Short Story) - Jack Dyer Fiction Prize

2006 National Endowment for the Arts Fellowship in Prose

== Bibliography ==
=== Novels ===
- My Lucky Face (1997)
- Dragon Chica (2010)
- Tiger Girl (2013) (sequel to Dragon Chica)
  - 2014 Asian/Pacific American Award for Literature for Best Young Novel from the Asian/Pacific American Librarians Association (APALA)
- Training Days (2017) (Novella)
  - Part of the Gemma Media Open Door Series intended to promote adult literacy

=== Short stories ===
==== Collections ====
- Tomorrow in Shanghai & Other Stories
- Useful Phrases for Immigrants (2018)
  - 2019 American Book Award
  - 2018 Bakwin Award, judged by Tayari Jones (beating out 233 entries to be published by the independent press Blair)
    - "Fish Boy", originally published in Crab Orchard Review, Vol. 23, No. 2 (Oct. 2018)
      - Jack Dyer Fiction Prize from the Crab Orchard Review
    - "Useful Phrases for Immigrants", originally published in Grist Journal (or The Grist: A Journal of the Literary Arts), Issue 11 (April 2018)
      - 2018 Pushcart Prize Nominee
    - "First Carvel in Beijing", originally published in Queen Mob's Tea House (July 27, 2017)
    - "Shouting Means I Love You", originally published in Glimmer Train, Issue 99 (Summer 2017)
- Glamorous Asians (2004)
  - Published by University of Indianapolis Press
    - "The Dancing Girl's Story"
    - "Nai Nai's Last Words"
    - "Easter"
    - "Mr. Chu Returns to His Sleeping Wife"
    - "Saving Sourdi"
      - Expanded into the novel Dragon Chica
    - "Your Grandmother, the War Criminal", originally published in The North American Review, Vol. 281, No. 4, pp. 41–43 (Jul-Aug., 1996)
      - Anthologized in Approaching Literature: Reading, Thinking, and Writing (4th Ed. 2016, Bedford/St. Martin's/Macmillan) by Peter Schakel and Jack Ridl

==== Uncollected short stories ====
- "The Witness", originally published in The Missouri Review, Summer 2017 Issue
  - Finalist, 2016 Jeffrey E. Smith Editors' Prize, The Missouri Review

=== Non-fiction ===
- The Girl from Purple Mountain (2002) (co-authored with Winberg Chai)
- Glamorous Asians (2004)
- Hapa Girl (2007)
  - 2008 Kiriyama Prize Notable Book
  - Honorable Mention from the Gustavus Myers Center for the Study of Bigotry and Human Rights
- Ba Jin's 1934 Autobiography (2008) (translated)
- China A to Z (2014) (co-authored with Winberg Chai)
- My Hungry Ghosts: Essays & Incantations (2026)

=== Essays ===
- "The Imagined Homeland" (2018), originally published in Sonora Review, Issue 74 ("The Future")
  - Sonora Review Essay Prize
- "The Blue Boot" (2013), originally published in The Missouri Review, Summer 2012 Issue
  - Named a Notable Essay of 2012 in Best American Essays 2013, edited by Cheryl Strayed
- "Lilacs" (2018), originally published in Prairie Schooner, University of Nebraska Press, Volume 92, No. 1, pp. 79–84 (Spring 2018)
  - Winner, Virginia Faulkner Award for Excellence in Writing from Prairie Schooner
- "Glamorous Asians" (2004) - collected in Glamorous Asians (2004)
- "Yellow Peril" (2004) - also collected in Glamorous Asians (2004)
