= New from Here =

2022 middle grade book by Kelly Yang

- Author: Kelly Yang
- Language: English
- Genre: Middle grade fiction
- Publisher: Simon & Schuster Books for Young Readers
- Publication date: March 1, 2022
- Publication place: United States
- Pages: 368
- Awards: California Young Reader Medal, OWL Award
- ISBN: 978-1534488311

New from Here is a semi-autobiographical middle grade fiction book written by Kelly Yang, published by Simon and Schuster in New York in 2022. This book is Yang's fifth published book, published on March 1, 2022.

== Plot ==
The story follows the protagonist Knox Wei-Evens, the middle child in a biracial family, who, along with his two siblings, Bowen and Lea Wei-Evans, and their mother, Julie Wei-Evans, migrate from their home in Hong Kong to America to escape the pandemic COVID-19 in Asia. The children are separated from their father, Andrew Evans, and their family's labradoodle, Cody, who remain in Hong Kong. The family settles in a cramped house inherited from Andrew's parents, located in El Cerrito, California, in a neighborhood called El Tereca, and for two weeks, self-quarantine themselves inside it for safety.

Following their self-imposed quarantine, the family began to interact with the outside world. The family found it arduous adjusting to the United States, experiencing dissonance with their past and present lives, and tensions escalated as Andrew downsized their house in Hong Kong and Julie repeatedly failed in finding an employer. Knox finds his experience of a room shared with his older brother Bowen was rather disagreeable, and his hobbies, such as soccer, are restricted from the new environment.

Knox learns he is diagnosed with ADHD after being enrolled at a public elementary school (in the fifth grade) while his mother talks with his teacher, Mrs. Turner. Knox acclimatizes well to his new school, befriending his teacher and slowly learning the new rules of the classroom he attended, comparing it with his old school in Hong Kong.

Knox gained a new friend, named Christopher, in school. He is teased and bullied with a variant of infection tag called "coronavirus tag" since he looks Chinese. Knox steps to protect him, but due to his racial ambiguity, the other schoolchildren ignore him. Knox then reveals he is from Hong Kong; the other children redirect their focus onto him, freeing Christopher of his teasing.

Knox's undiagnosed ADHD gets him into a few other tight situations, as when Julie had her interview for a technology company named Focu$ (a company with an application that deducted money for your procrastination), and when he was shopping. While Knox was playing soccer, Tyler calls Knox "Beach," (in reference to Knox being named after Knox Beach, Northern California) and Knox kicks his ball over the school perimeter. That windblown day, Knox climbed the ten-foot-tall fence, retrieved the ball, and was subsequently caught by the principal, who reported Knox's misbehavior to Knox's mother, whose interview was cancelled. Another time, he used a go-cart meant for elderly people in a store, losing control of it and crashing into a once-neat pyramid of soda bottles.

Broader themes of battling anti-Asian racism occur in the book. The siblings and mother visited Christopher's family's restaurant, Uncle Chang's Sichuan Garden, right next to the store Lucky's. A Caucasian man ordered ten boxes of moo-shu pancakes, only to reject them, after he found the moo-shu pork was handmade by Chinese immigrants. Julie, in empathy for Christopher's family's experience, bought it all before anyone could protest.

Meanwhile, tensions escalated between the older and younger brothers, such as when Knox ruined Julie's shirt with Clorox, or when his ADHD acted out. In high dudgeon, Knox took Bowen's prized Bose headphones and hid them in the garage; he thought of pawning them.

Lea, Knox, and Bowen felt lonely without their father. They noticed the effect on their mother, too. They composed a plan to create a LinkedIn account for Andrew and collect five hundred connections and plenty endorsements without his knowledge and conduct interviews—their plan was to explain the situation to Andrew with a dozen job offers in front of the door. The question was how to get connections. The siblings got the idea of running a garage sale and mandatorily asking for a connection per every purchase.

Some days later, the siblings, after briefly consulting their mother Julie Wei-Evans, decide to hold a garage sale themselves. They haste through the setup, gathering items they see as "disposable" at first glance. Posterior to the garage sale, Julie inspected the house and found "Grandma Francine's old antiques" and other items were missing. After interrogating the children, she discovers her precious ruby anniversary earrings from her husband Andrew were mistakenly sold for a quarter by Knox, who assumed the purple jewelry box it was contained in was empty; she bemoaned her loss.

Knox Wei-Evans, along with his siblings Bowen and Lea, hunt for the ruby anniversary earrings, driven by guilt. The children awaited the next day; it was too late by the time they set to go out. Next morning, they brainstorm a lead. Firstly, the children recount their memories of that fateful day. Lea remembers two men with a "spotted poodle," which Bowen corrects to a Boston terrier. Lea realizes the neighbor living catercorner to their house, Mr. Brady, had a security camera offering a broad view of their garage sale and all the pedestrians coming and going. The siblings decide to take a visit to Mr. Brady's house.

After much friendly discourse (of how Mr. Brady was once a journalist covering soccer tournaments), Mr. Brady mentions his broken Wi-Fi and how he is reluctant to give Bowen and Knox the film because of it. Bowen asks to fix the problem in the Wi-Fi router in exchange for the security camera recordings. He is paid twenty dollars for his labor and Mr. Brady's thankfulness. The trio take a screenshot of the dog and the two men in the visual recording and print it; they find the dog is a Boston terrier with a glistening collar in the camera's grainy footage, as suspected.

One of the siblings had the idea of asking people in the dog park if they had seen the collared dog in their photograph and sleuth for the dog themselves there. They meet a pink-haired local dog trainer with a shirt reading "Team Herbivore" with AirPods along their path after seeing a similar-looking Boston terrier and petting it. Knox asks her if she has seen the dog in their photograph, to which she replies that she has not seen the men, but had seen the dog in puppy socialization class, giving the number of the instructor to Bowen, which he saves on his smartphone. Knox, Bowen, and Lea promptly thank her.

The siblings kept on walking, and an unleashed labradoodle, with a collar reading "CHARLIE," ambled to their feet. The dog reminded Knox of Cody, and the three of them started to pet it. The next thing Knox knows, a furious, Caucasian man, CJ Axel, outfitted in the hat and glasses of a fisherman, yelled sharply at Bowen to get away from his dog, calling him a racist slur. Ashamed and angry, he takes off, Lea and Knox trailing behind him. Bowen makes Knox promise not to alert Julie about this incident.

Meanwhile, Andrew's doppelgänger LinkedIn account's connections started compounding, as Knox shows Bowen on his computer. Bowen messages the dog trainer.

The dog trainer calls back the next day, explaining that the dog belongs to "the Taradippins," Maximillian and Pax Taradippin, and telling them their address. They track down Maximillian and Pax; they find out the Taradippins commercially resell masks and sanitary equipment and jack the price from what they got their shipments for. Bowen finds some old masks from SARS in their garage, interesting the Taradippins, which they trade for the earring, after being rejected multiple times with different offers.

At Christopher's place, Knox takes it upon himself to be Christopher online publicist. However, online, CJ Axel spouted racist remarks, troubling Knox. Knox stresses over how to help Christopher in a polite way. Knox devises a plan; he stealthily orders three dinosaur suits for he and his sibling to don whenever delivering food for customers ordering takeout; the siblings get a cut of it—to immigrate Andrew over to America.

Bowen fails his first interview for Andrew; however, days later, Knox succeeds in the same endeavor.

Julie has an interview in New York City and plans to drop the children with Auntie Jackie, who is a relative the siblings were jealous of, due to her wealth compared to the Wei-Evanses. They contemplate the decision, and arrive at the conclusion that for a single day, it must not be much. However, her daughter, Maggie, is infected with a case of contagious pinkeye, and this plan is cancelled. At the end, Julie Wei-Evans decides to leave the trio at home without her, for "only" one day.

The children take a Uber vehicle, but due to growing anti-Asian xenophobia fueled by the pandemic, Bowen replaces Julie's profile picture with a blonde "Old Navy" model and changed the surname to simply "Evans" to board it. Back at home, Bowen and Knox had a dispute, which was quickly remedied.

For food, they popped popcorn, and Bowen went into the garage for spices and seasoning for the popcorn. Knox expected him to reappear with a bowl of cheesy popcorn in his hands, and he appeared, apoplectic, with his Bose headphones in his hands. He had realized Knox thought of pawning them. The brotherly tension boiled over; Knox ran away from home with his backpack, also incensed. He passed the wild horses near his house, and he recorded letters to his father on his iPad. Right after recording his messages, he succumbed to sleep.

The next day, Julie, Bowen, and Lea found him, and Bowen and Knox amended. Their brotherly relationship was repatched. Andrew was furious at Julie for letting the children stay alone.

Knox suddenly falls ill. Immediately following this, Knox reveals his part in delivering takeout for Christopher's family, and he is immediately taken to the emergency room of a hospital and quarantined; he exhibited known symptoms of COVID-19. Andrew, fearful, flies over with Cody the labradoodle, leaving his apartment in Hong Kong behind. After medical diagnostics were taken, it was found that Knox had a common cold or flu. In a few days he was discharged from the hospital.

The story ends with the family starting a new chapter in their life; but this time, together.

== Reception ==
New from Here received a critique from The New York Times, with Hannah Beech describing the protagonist Knox as a volatile, "personable, affecting narrator." Beech noted that book carried heavy themes with sensitivity, and captured the "American nuances" that people from abroad often notice. Kirkus Reviews described the protagonist as "[i]mpulsive and tenderhearted", praising the story as "heartfelt," "timely and compelling," and the audiobook narration as "relatable" and verveful.

The Horn Book, under Michelle Lee, opines "this is a strong and timely novel about a family [the Wei-Evanses] weathering adversity." Lee notes how the book introduces humor, and creates an empathetic image of the main character, as the family weathers adversity from the pandemic, COVID-19. Pamela Brill, operating under Publishers Weekly, asserts that "[f]amily life has helped shape much of Yang’s writing." In Booklist, Van McGary, after reviewing New from Here, described it as a "timely, heartwarming story" with "honest, age-relavant storytelling."

New from Here was awarded the 2025 California Young Reader Medal in the "Intermediate" category.

In Booklist, New from Here was criticized as having some "pacing issues" due to the "sheer weight of so many different topics," and the children's ideas to bring their father to the United States being "a bit far-fetched." The Horn Book comments that "the plot can feel a bit forced," and says "Yang largely skirts the mainland China–Hong Kong political conflict." Reader reviews from The StoryGraph have found that Bowen's age and grade are inconsistent, along with his behavior, the children often "get away" with serious matters, and Yang's portrayal of ADHD is incorrect. A review from a user going under the online handle "amh08" states: "What I have an issue with in this book is the problematic things the kids do throughout the book while trying to be helpful and how Yang depicts ADHD."

=== Challenges ===
Although this book has not achieved the same degree of censorship as Kelly Yang's debut novel, Front Desk, this book still occurs on occasion in lists of censored books. For instance, in a PDF with statistics from PEN America's Index of School Book Bans, this novel appears as a banned book.
