= Krys =

Krys is a primarily masculine given name and a surname. Notable people with the name include:

== Given name ==
- Krys Barch (born 1980), Canadian hockey player
- Krys Barnes (born 1988), American football player
- Krys Kolanos (born 1981), Canadian hockey player
- Krys Lee, South Korean author, journalist, and translator
- Krys Marshall (born 1988/1989), American actress
- Krys Sobieski (born 1950), Polish soccer player and coach

== Surname ==
- Sheldon J. Krys (1934–2024), American diplomat
