= Suzanne Kamata =

American author and educator

Suzanne Kamata (born September 29, 1965) is an American author and educator.

== About ==
Kamata was born in Grand Haven, Michigan on September 29, 1965. She studied at Kalamazoo College, the University of South Carolina, and has an MFA in creative writing from the University of British Columbia. She is an associate professor at Naruto University of Education in Japan.

== Awards and honors ==
- 2019 NCT Asia (National Consortium for Teaching About Asia) Honorable Mention YA/High School Literature - for Indigo Girl
- 2014 Asian/Pacific American Award for Literature, Honor Award - for Gadget Girl: The Art of Being Invisible
- 2014 Skipping Stones, Multicultural and International Honor Award - for Gadget Girl: The Art of Being Invisible
- 2013 Next Generation Indie Book Awards, Finalist - for Gadget Girl: The Art of Being Invisible
- Named Book of Outstanding Merit by Bank Street College - Gadget Girl: The Art of Being Invisible
- Grand Prize Winner of the Paris Book Festival - for Gadget Girl: The Art of Being Invisible
- Sakura Medal Nominee - for Gadget Girl: The Art of Being Invisible
- International Book Award Winner for YA - Gadget Girl: The Art of Being Invisible

== Publications ==
Her short stories, essays, articles and book reviews have appeared in over 100 publications including Real Simple, Brain, Child, Cicada, and The Japan Times.

=== Novels ===
- 2008 Losing Kei (Leapfrog Press, 2008)
- 2013 Gadget Girl: The Art of Being Invisible (GemmaMedia, 2013)
- 2014 Screaming Divas (Simon Pulse, 2014)
- 2017 The Mermaids of Lake Michigan (Wyatt-Mackenzie, 2017)
- 2019 Indigo Girl (GemmaMedia, 2019)

=== Travel memoirs ===
- 2017 A Girls’ Guide to the Islands (Gemma Open Door, 2017)
- 2019 Squeaky Wheels: Travels with my Daughter by Train, Plane, Metro, Tuk-tuk and Wheelchair (Wyatt-Mackenzie, 2019)

=== Short story collection ===
- The Beautiful One Has Come
