= Janet S. Wong =

American children's book author

- Born: Los Angeles, California, United States
- Education: University of California, Los Angeles (B.A); Yale Law School (J.D)
- Writing career
- Language: English
- Years active: 1994—now
- Genres: poetry, picture books, middle grade fiction, young adult fiction, non-fiction
- Notable works: Alex and the Wednesday Chess Club; A Suitcase of Seaweed & MORE
- Notable awards: 2021 NCTE Award for Excellence in Poetry for Children; 2001 and 2001-2003 Asian/Pacific American Award for Young Adult Literature; 2005 ILA Celebrate Literacy Award
- Website: www.janetwong.com//

Janet S. Wong is an American poet and author of children's books. She has written over 30 books, primarily poetry, picture books, and middle grade fiction. At the age of seven, she had an active imagination. She used this later in her life to write poetry and books. She is the co-creator, along with Sylvia Vardell, of The Poetry Friday Anthology series and the Poetry Friday Power Book series, published by Pomelo Books. Her most recent book is HOP TO IT: Poems to Get You Moving, an anthology of 100 poems by 90 poets that focuses on the topics of movement, the pandemic, and social justice. She is the winner of the 2021 NCTE Award for Excellence in Poetry for Children, a lifetime achievement honor considered the most prestigious award that a children's poet can receive.

== Personal life ==
Wong was born in Los Angeles, California, and raised in Koreatown, as the child of a Chinese immigrant father and a Korean immigrant mother. Her parents met while her father was serving in the U.S. Army in Korea. She grew up not speaking Chinese or Korean, something she regrets and discusses when addressing a multilingual audience. When she was seven, her family moved to San Anselmo, California. This move from an urban area to a semi-rural/suburban area, where children would catch lizards after school, was featured in her book Minn and Jake.

Wong is married and lives in Princeton, New Jersey.

== Career ==
During her junior year at UCLA, Wong went to France to study art history at the Université de Bordeaux. When she returned from France, she co-founded the UCLA Immigrant Children's Art Project, an initiative to encourage refugees to express themselves through art.

Wong graduated from UCLA with a B.A. in history in 1983, and later attended Yale Law School while occasionally working as a substitute teacher. She graduated from Yale Law School with a J.D. in 1987.

Prior to becoming an author, Wong practiced corporate and labor law as Director of Labor Relations at Universal Studios Hollywood.

While browsing in a book store, looking for a gift for her baby cousin, she fell in love with picture books and decided she wanted to try writing them herself. The first thing she wrote, however, was a middle grade novel that she never sent to any publishers. She then wrote a picture book manuscript every week. After receiving many rejection letters, she realized that she needed to work on her craft. In 1991, she decided to attend a writing class in poetry taught by Myra Cohn Livingston through UCLA Extension. She spent eighteen months honing her craft and attending writing classes before she was able to publish her first book, Good Luck Gold and Other Poems.

== Works ==
=== Picture books ===
==== in print ====
- Alex and the Wednesday Chess Club, illustrated by Stacey Schuett (Margaret K. McElderry Books/Simon & Schuster, 2004)
- Apple Pie 4th of July, illustrated by Margaret Chodos-Irvine (Harcourt, 2002)
- This Next New Year, illustrated by Yangsook Choi (Frances Foster Books/Farrar, Straus and Giroux, 2000); also in a Chinese-English bilingual edition and a Korean-English bilingual edition
- You Have to Write, illustrated by Teresa Flavin (Margaret K. McElderry Books/Simon & Schuster, 2002)
- Homegrown House, illustrated by E.B. Lewis (Margaret K. McElderry Books/Simon & Schuster, 2009)

==== Additional Picture books ====
- The Trip Back Home, illustrated by Bo Jia (Harcourt, 2000)
- Buzz, illustrated by Margaret Chodos-Irvine (Harcourt, 2000)
- Grump, illustrated by John Wallace (Margaret K. McElderry Books/Simon & Schuster, 2001)
- Hide & Seek, illustrated by Margaret Chodos-Irvine (Harcourt, 2005)
- The Dumpster Diver, illustrated by David Roberts (Candlewick Press, 2007)

=== Additional Children's Books ===
- Minn and Jake, illustrated by Geneviève Côté (Frances Foster Books/Farrar, Straus and Giroux, 2003)
- Before It Wriggles Away (part of the Meet the Author series; Richard C. Owen Publishers, 2006)
- Minn and Jake's Almost Terrible Summer, illustrated by Geneviève Côté (Farrar, Straus and Giroux, 2008)
- Me and Rolly Maloo, illustrated by Elizabeth Buttler (Charlesbridge, 2010)

=== Poetry Collections ===
- Good Luck Gold and Other Poems (Margaret K. McElderry Books, 1994)
- A Suitcase of Seaweed and Other Poems (Margaret K. McElderry Books, 1996)
- Behind the Wheel: Poems About Driving (Margaret K. McElderry Books, 1999)
- The Rainbow Hand: Poems about Mothers and Children, illustrated by Jennifer Hewitson (Margaret K. McElderry Books, 1999)
- Night Garden: Poems From The World Of Dreams, illustrated by Julie Paschkis (Margaret K. McElderry Books, 2000)
- Knock on Wood: Poems About Superstitions, illustrated by Julie Paschkis (Margaret K. McElderry Books, 2003)
- Twist: Yoga Poems, illustrated by Julie Paschkis (Margaret K. McElderry Books, 2007)
- Once Upon A Tiger: New Beginnings for Endangered Animals, illustrated by Sladjana Vasic (2011)
- Declaration of Interdependence: Poems for an Election Year (Poetry Suitcase, 2012)
- A Suitcase of Seaweed & MORE (Pomelo Books, 2019 - an NCTE Poetry Notable)

=== Anthologies Created with Sylvia Vardell ===
- Dear One: A Tribute to Lee Bennett Hopkins (National Council of Teachers of English, 2009)
- The Poetry Tag Time Series, co-authored with Sylvia Vardell (Poetry Tag Time, P*TAG, and Gift Tag; 2010–2011)
- The Poetry Friday Anthology Series:
  - The Poetry Friday Anthology (K-5 Common Core and TEKS Editions) (Pomelo Books, 2012)
  - The Poetry Friday Anthology for Middle School (Grades 6-8 Common Core and TEKS Editions) (Pomelo Books, 2013)
  - The Poetry Friday Anthology for Science (K-5 Teacher/Librarian Edition) (Pomelo Books, 2014)
  - The Poetry of Science: The Poetry Friday Anthology for Science for KIDS (Pomelo Books, 2015)
  - The Poetry Friday Anthology for Celebrations: Holiday Poems for the Whole Year in English and Spanish (in a Teacher/Librarian Edition and also a Children's Edition) (Pomelo Books, 2015 - an ILA Notable Book for a Global Society)
- The Poetry Friday Power Book Series
  - YOU JUST WAIT: A Poetry Friday Power Book (Pomelo Books, 2016 - an NCTE Poetry Notable)
  - HERE WE GO: A Poetry Friday Power Book (Pomelo Books, 2017 - an NCTE Poetry Notable and an NNSTOY Social Justice Book)
  - PET CRAZY: A Poetry Friday Power Book (Pomelo Books, 2017)
- GREAT Morning! Poems for School Leaders to Read Aloud (Pomelo Books, 2018)
- HOP TO IT: Poems to Get You Moving (Pomelo Books, 2020)

=== (Included in) Anthologies Edited by Others ===
- Amazing Faces by Lee Bennett Hopkins, illustrated by Chris Soentpiet (Lee & Low Books, 2011)
- A World Full of Poems by Sylvia Vardell (DK Books, 2020)
- I Remember: Poems and Pictures of Heritage by Lee Bennett Hopkins (Lee & Low Books, 2019)
- National Geographic Book of Animal Poetry by J. Patrick Lewis (National Geographic, 2012)
- Poems to Learn by Heart by Caroline Kennedy (Disney-Hyperion, 2013)

== Awards ==
Won

- 1997 Claremont Stone Center for Children's Books - Recognition of Merit Award
- 2000 Penn State University - Lee Bennett Hopkins Award Honor
- 2001 Asian/Pacific American Award for Young Adult Literature for The Trip Back Home
- 2001-2003 Asian/Pacific American Award for Young Adult Literature for Apple Pie 4th of July
- 2005 IRA Celebrate Literacy Award
- 2021 NCTE Award for Excellence in Poetry for Children [a lifetime achievement award for a poet's body of work, and the most prestigious award given to a children's poet]
- Featured in annual Best Books, Notable Books, and other award lists of the American Library Association (YALSA), Bank Street College, L.A. Times, and N.Y. Times
