= Wendy Wan-Long Shang =

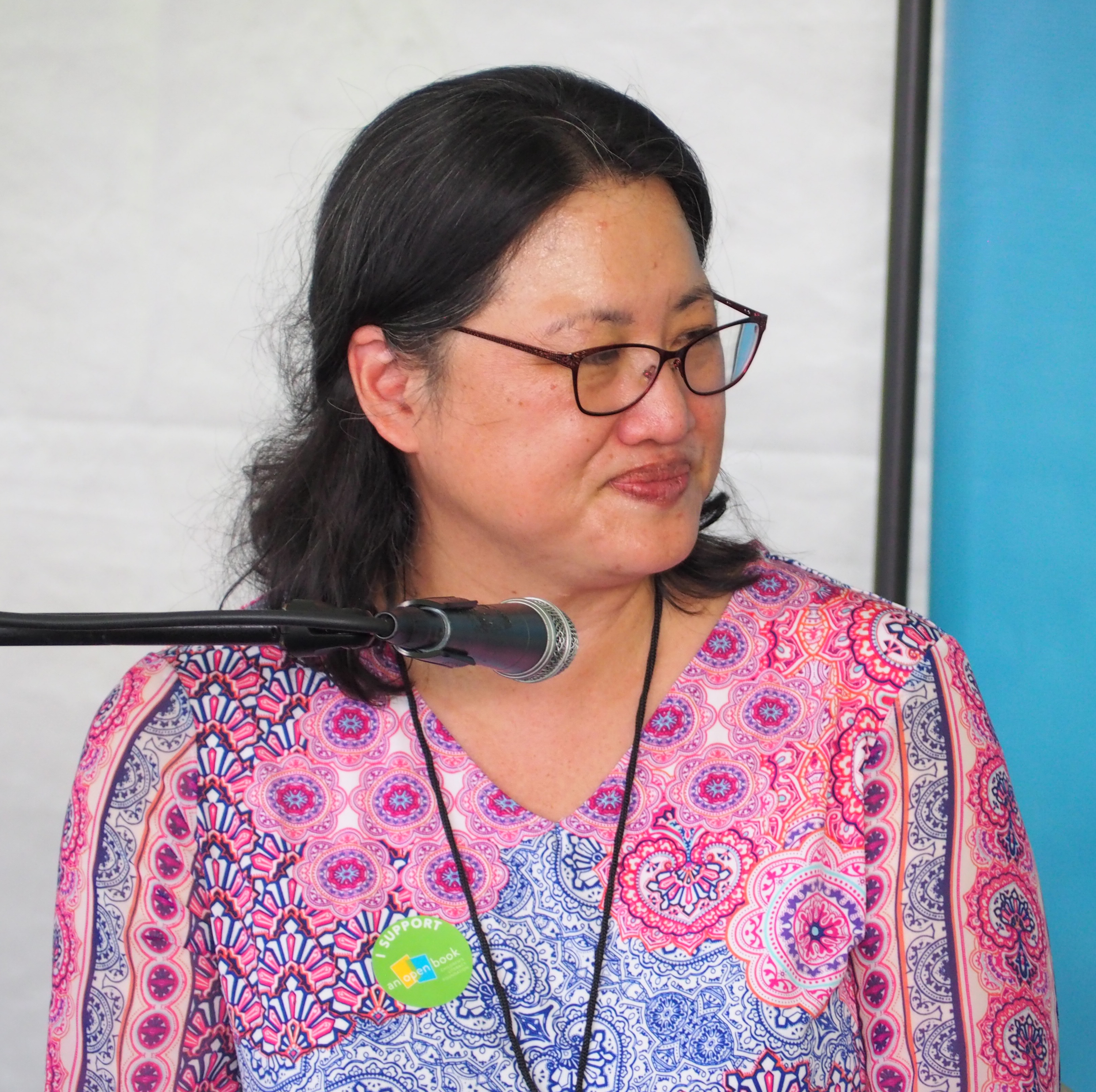
Wendy Shang reading at 2023 Gaithersburg Book Festival

Wendy Wan-Long Shang is an author of children's books.

== Biography ==
Shang grew up in Fairfax County, Virginia. Her parents were Chinese immigrants to the United States. She received an undergraduate degree from and attended law school at the University of Virginia. She worked for the American Bar Association for five years.

Her debut novel, The Great Wall of Lucy Wu (Scholastic, 2010), received the Asian/Pacific American Awards for Literature.

Shang's book Not Your All-American Girl (Scholastic, 2020) is a companion novel to This Is Just a Test (2017). Both novels were co-written with Madelyn Rosenberg.

She wrote the first Chinese-American title character in the American Girl Company's annual Girl of the Year series.

As of 2022, Shang lives in Falls Church, Virginia.

== Works ==
- The Great Wall of Lucy Wu. Scholastic, 2010.
- The Way Home Looks Now. Scholastic, 2015.
- This Is Just a Test. With Madelyn Rosenberg. Scholastic, 2017.
- Not Your All-American Girl. With Madelyn Rosenberg. Scholastic, 2020.
- Over the Moon. Illustrated by Glen Keane. HarperCollins, 2020.
- The Rice in the Pot Goes Round and Round. Illustrated by Lorian Tu. Orchard/Scholastic, 2021.
- Corinne. Illustrated by Peijin Yang. American Girl, 2021.
- Corinne to the Rescue. Illustrated by Peijin Yang. American Girl, 2021.
- The Secret Battle of Evan Pao. Scholastic, 2022.
