= Madelyn Rosenberg =

American children's book author

Madelyn Rosenberg (b. 1966) is an American author of children's books and former journalist.

== Biography ==
Madelyn Rosenberg attended North Carolina State University, where she earned a bachelor's degree in 1989. She earned a master's degree from Boston University in 2002. She is a member of the Society of Children's Book Writers and Illustrators. She is Jewish. She lives in Virginia.

She previously worked for Greensboro News Record and The Roanoke Times. She was an adjunct faculty member at North Carolina State University, from 2002 to 2003.

She received the Magazine Merit Honor Award from the Society for Children's Book Writers and Illustrators in 2005. Her books have also received honors, including a Sydney Taylor Book Award, a Green Earth Book Award honor, state book awards, and more.

Rosenberg's book Not Your All-American Girl (Scholastic, 2020) is a companion novel to This Is Just a Test (2017). Both novels were co-written with Wendy Wan-Long Shang.

== Selected works ==
- The Schmutzy Family. Illustrated by Paul Meisel. Holiday House, 2012.
- Happy Birthday, Tree!: A Tu B'Shevat Story. Illustrated by Jana Christy. Albert Whitman, 2012.
- Canary in the Cole Mine. Holiday House, 2013.
- Dream Boy. With Mary Crockett. Sourcebooks Fire, 2014.
- Take Care. Illustrated by Giuliana Gregori. Whitman, 2018.
- Cyclops of Central Park. Illustrated by Victoria Tentler-Krylov. Putnam, 2020.
- One Small Hop. Scholastic, 2021.

=== How to Behave ===
- How to Behave at a Tea Party. Illustrated by Heather Ross. Katherine Tegen Books, 2014.
- How to Behave at a Dog Show. Illustrated by Heather Ross. Katherine Tegen Books, 2015.

=== Nanny X ===
- Nanny X. Holiday House, 2014.
- Nanny X Returns. Illustrated by Karen Donnelly. Holiday House, 2015.

=== With Wendy Wan-Long Shang ===
- This Is Just a Test. With Wendy Wan-Long Shang. Scholastic, 2017.
- Not Your All-American Girl. With Wendy Wan-Long Shang. Scholastic, 2020.
