= Grace M. Cho =

Korean-American anthropologist

Grace M. Cho is a Korean-American sociologist and author who is known for her 2021 memoir Tastes Like War which was a finalist for the National Book Award for Nonfiction. The book won the 2022 Asian Pacific American Literature award for Nonfiction and was featured as one of the best 100 books of the year by Time. The book details Cho's relationship with her late mother who developed schizophrenia when Grace was 15. Cho learns how to cook many Korean dishes as a way to be closer to her mother. In writing the memoir, Cho uses the dishes as a prologue to present related aspects of broader Korean culture and history. Regarding this literary approach, Time magazine stated that the author "seamlessly joins heartrending memories with broad cultural, linguistic and political analysis".

Cho's 2008 book Haunting the Korean Diaspora: Shame, Secrecy, and the Forgotten War examines the relationship between Korean sex workers and American servicemen in the Korean War. More than a million Korean women served as sex workers during and after the Korean War, and more than 100,000 Korean women married American servicemen and moved to the United States. Cho argues that this trauma from sexual violence was passed onto future Korean-American generations as transgenerational trauma. The book won the Asia & Asian America Section Book Award from the American Sociological Association.

Cho completed her PhD in Sociology and Women's Studies at the CUNY Graduate Center and she is a professor of sociology at the College of Staten Island. Her other writings have appeared in The New Inquiry, Poem Memoir Story, Contexts, Gastronomica, Feminist Studies, Women's Studies Quarterly and Qualitative Inquiry.
