= JaNay Brown-Wood =

American author

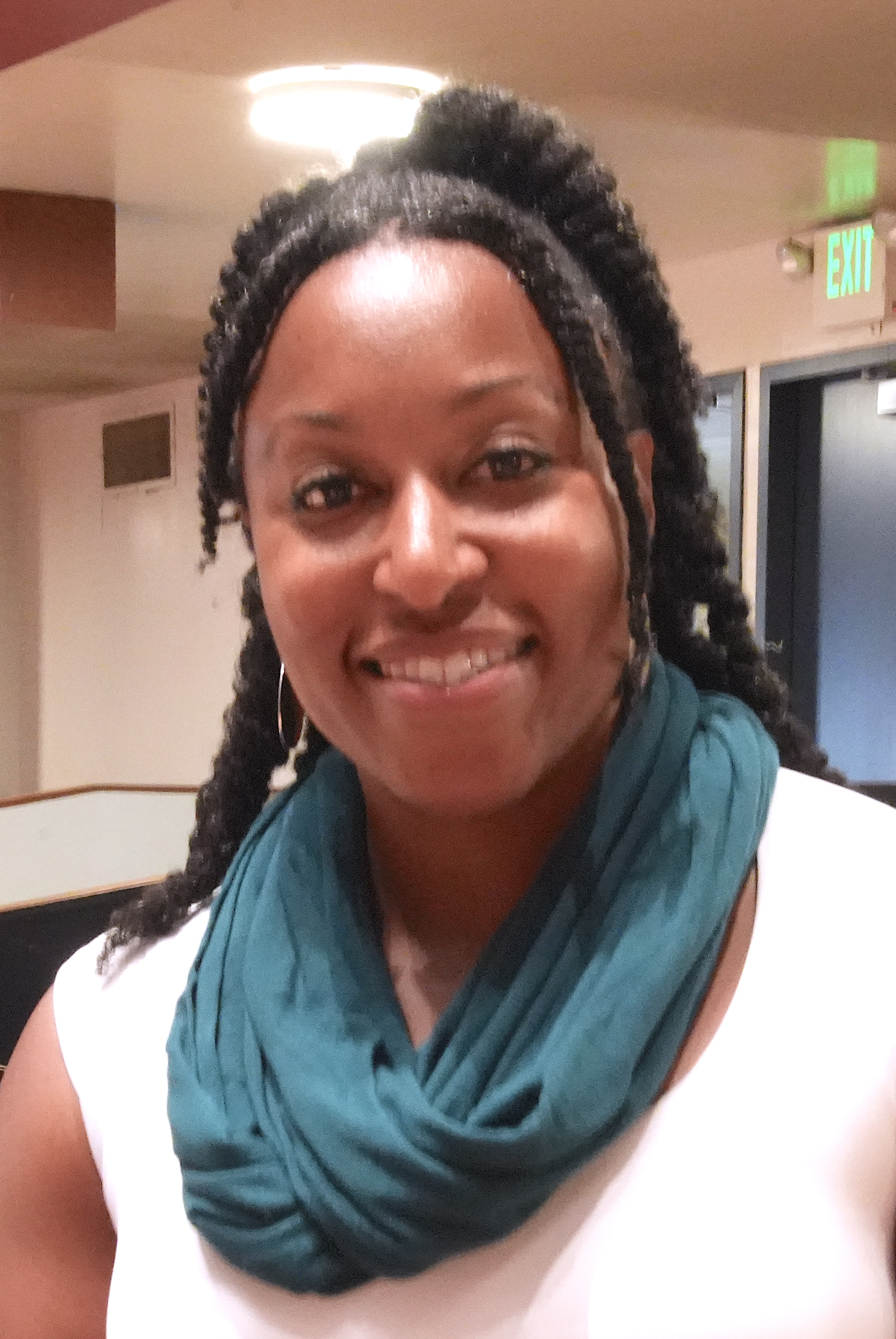
JaNay Brown-Wood at Richmond Literacy Fair 2025

JaNay Brown-Wood is a professor and writer of children's books.

== Biography ==
=== Early life and education ===
Brown-Wood was born in California. She attended the University of California, Los Angeles, where she earned a bachelor of arts in psychology and applied developmental psychology in 2007. She then attended California State University, Sacramento, for a master of arts in child development. She received a Ph.D. in education from the University of California, Davis.

=== Career ===
Brown-Wood is a member of the Society of Children's Book Writers and Illustrators. She is also a professor and researcher at the University of California, Davis.

Her book Grandma's Tiny House (Charlesbridge, 2017) received a starred review from Publishers Weekly. In 2021, following the announcement that certain Dr. Seuss books would no longer be republished due to how certain groups were depicted, Stephen Colbert recommended Brown-Wood's book Imani's Moon (Charlesbridge, 2014) on Late Show With Stephan Colbert, asking audience to "consider these books from people of color".

Why Not You? (Random House, 2022), which Brown-Wood wrote with Ciara and Russell Wilson, received a starred review from School Library Journal. It was a New York Times bestseller.

Brown-Wood has written other children's books, including a biography of Harriet Tubman.

=== Personal life ===
Brown-Wood is married and has one child.

== Selected works ==
=== Picture books ===
- Imani's Moon, illustrated by Hazel Mitchell, Charlesbridge, 2014.
- Grandma’s Tiny House: A Counting Story! illustrated by Priscilla Burris, Charlesbridge, 2017.
- Shhh! The Baby’s Asleep, illustrated by Elissambura, Charlesbridge, 2021.
- Follow that Line! Magic at Your Fingertips, illustrated by Robert Justus. Running Kids Press (New York, NY), 2022.
- Why Not You? Ciara and Russell Wilson, illustrated by Jessica Gibson. Random House, 2022.

==== Chicken Soup for the Soul Babies series ====
- Me. You. Us. (Whose Turn?), illustrated by Jade Orlando, Charlesbridge, 2022.
- Fast and Slow (Both Just Right!), illustrated by Jade Orlando, Charlesbridge, 2022.

==== Chicken Soup for the Soul Kids series ====
- Will Mia Play It Safe? A Book about Dying New Things, illustrated by Lorian Tu, Charlesbridge, 2022.
- Oliver Powers through: A Book about Helping out around the House, illustrated by Lorian Tu & Jenna Nahyun Chung. Charlesbridge, 2022.

==== Where in the Garden series ====
- Amara’s Farm, illustrated by Samara Hardy, Peachtree Publishing, 2021.
