= The Great Wall of Lucy Wu =

Middle grade novel by Wendy Wan Long Shang

- First edition cover
- Author: Wendy Wan-Long Shang
- Original title: The Great Wall of Lucy Lu
- Language: English
- Published: Scholastic Inc, 2011
- Pages: 320
- ISBN: 978-0545162166

The Great Wall of Lucy Wu is the 2011 debut novel of Chinese-American author Wendy Wan-Long Shang. It was first published in January 2011 through Scholastic Inc. The work focuses on the concept of a young girl starting the sixth grade and dealing with the troubles that come with growing up but also with having a split cultural identity. The book is considered suitable for readers ages 8–12.

== Plot ==
Lucy Wu, an aspiring W.N.B.A. player and interior designer of sporty girls accessories and home decor, is almost a 6th grader about to have her own room. She thinks her life is almost perfect: She's finally going to be a sixth grader and, her sister, Regina is going to college, meaning she'll have her own room. The title character also plans to try out for captain on her basketball team. Her grandmother's sister, Yi Po, is coming to live at her house, with Lucy, in her room, that was supposed to be all hers.

== Reception ==
Critical reception has been positive, and Smithsonian Asian Pacific American Center stated that "Shang’s debut novel is a well-blended cornucopia of the multicultural tween’s challenges." The Los Angeles Times wrote a favorable review for the book, which they felt would appeal to "young readers struggling with issues of self-identity, whatever their heritage." The Bulletin of the Center for Children's Books also praised the book and commented that "Bits of Chinese history and culture as well as allusions to incidents of prejudice and racism are effectively integrated without melodrama, leaving the focus entirely on Lucy’s preteen and familial experience. Her struggle to determine what and who is important to her will most certainly resonate with young readers."

=== Selected awards and recognition ===
- 2012 NCTE/CLA Notable Children's Books in the English Language Arts
- 2012 Children's Literature Award, Asian-Pacific American Librarians Association
