= Heart of a Samurai =

2010 novel by Margi Preus

- Author: Margi Preus
- Illustrator: Manjiro Nakahama, Jillian Tamaki
- Cover artist: Jillian Tamaki
- Language: English
- Genre: Historical novel
- Published: Amulet Books
- Publication place: Japan
- Media type: Print
- Pages: 282 pp
- Awards: Newbery Honor Book
- ISBN: 978-1-4197-0200-6

Heart of a Samurai is a 2010 young adult historical novel by American author Margi Preus. The novel is closely based on the true story of Manjiro Nakahama (1827–1898) and is illustrated by his drawings, with jacket illustration by Jillian Tamaki. Heart of a Samurai has received numerous awards and honors, including being named as a Newbery Medal Honor Book in 2011.

== Plot ==
Heart of a Samurai is based on the real story of a Japanese boy, who is believed to have been one of the first Japanese people to land in America. In 1841, Manjiro Nakahama, a young fisherman at the age of fourteen, lived in a remote, poor fishing village in Japan. He dreamed of being a Samurai, a royal title bequeathed solely by inheritance. The fishing ship he worked on encountered a storm and ended up drifting out to the sea until it landed on an island which he and the crew named "Bird Island".

After months staying on the island, Manjiro and his crew were rescued by Captain Whitfield, aboard the John Howland, an America whaleship. Manjiro caught whales and quickly gained Captain Whitfield's admiration. By the time they reached Hawaii, the duo had developed a special relationship. Captain Whitfield wanted to adopt Manjiro and go back to America with him. In spite of the Japanese empire having portrayed foreigners as evil and barbarians, Manjiro was determined to see a new world through his adventure by stepping out of his comfort zone andleaving his crew members behind. Upon landing in America, Manjiro found the majority of Americans he encountered had shown kindness toward him, however, some others discriminated against him as a foreigner. He worked hard at school and took care of his new family while Captain Whitfield was at sea.

Finally, after a few years a chance to go home appeared, he quickly jumped on it. On his return to Japan, he was imprisoned for being a “spy” of a foreign country. Japan had isolated itself from the world for more than two hundred years by then. But soon the Japanese Dynasty welcomed him and made him do numerous important tasks.

== Characters ==
- Manjiro aka John Mung-- Manjiro is a humble and innocent character. His curiosity and open mindedness brought him to a ten years' adventure in America. His eagerness to learn and forward thinking led him to successfully claim his unlikely dream of being a Samurai.
- Denzo, Goemon, Jusuke, and Toraemon – Manjiro's crew members of the shipwrecked Japanese fishing ship.
- Captain Whitfield-- Captain Whitfield is in charge of the John Howland, a whaleship. He is a pious, religious person. He provided the best possible aid for Manjiro to attain education and later learn a trade to be independent financially.
- Jolly--Jolly was a harpooner (boatsteerer) of John Howland before Captain Whitfield dismissed him due to his dishonesty. He discriminated against Manjiro and abused him verbally and physically.
- Tom--Tom is Manjiro's classmate in the Bedford School of Navigation. He bullied Manjiro from the first day of school. Tom portrays Manjiro as a spy and warns other students that being friends with him is anti-American.
- Job--Job is Manjiro's friend after he realized that Tom was being really rude to Manjiro, and has a lot of fun.
- Terry--Terry is a great friend of Manjiro, goes anywhere with him, and helps Manjiro name his horse.

== Critical reception ==
Heart of a Samurai received many compliments and awards. As Daniel Kraus wrote, "It’s a classic fish-out-of-water story (although this fish goes into the water repeatedly), and it’s precisely this classic structure that gives the novel the sturdy bones of a timeless tale." Roger Sutton had said, in The Horn Book Magazine that “the facts of Manjiro's life are inherently dramatic (later episodes include a stop at the Gold Rush, a mutiny, and a return to Japan), but Preus keeps her hero human-sized and empathetic, allowing readers to see and learn along with him the ways of a strange new world." Michael Cart, the author of Young Adult Literature: From Romance to Realism, asserts that it is “a more mature, sophisticated, and artful historical fiction, one that is honest about the realities of history for older YAs”.

== Awards ==
- Newbery Medal Honor Book in 2011
- The Best Children 's Books of the Year for Historical Fiction (ages 12–14) by Bank Street College in 2011
- Asian/Pacific American Award for Literature for Children's Literature by Asian/Pacific American Librarians Association in 2010-2011
- Noteworthy Titles for Children and Teens (ages 10–14) by Capitol Choices in 2011
- Top Ten Books by Shelf Awareness in 2010
- Children's Books of 2010 for Older Readers by New York Public Library
- Best Books for Children and Teens for Fiction with Great Boy Characters under Historical Fiction category by Kirkus Reviews in 2010
- Best Children's Books of 2010 for Fiction by Publishers Weekly
- Autumn 2010 for the Teen Readers by the IndieBound Kids' Next list
- 2011 Notable Children's Book for Older Readers by American Library Association
- Maud Hart Lovelace Book Award, Division II (Grades 6–8): nominee, 2014–15

== Author's background ==
Margi Preus is an American writer who specializes in children books and playwrights. She also writes comic plays, adaptations, libretto and short fiction. Preus has directed Colder by the Lake Comedy Theatre for twenty years in Duluth, Minnesota. She graduated from Binghamton University, SUNY. She is a children's literature instructor at the College of St. Scholastica, school of Education, and University of Minnesota-Duluth in her leisure time. Preus discovered Manjiro's true story upon doing research for her previous picture book, The Peace Bell, at the local library in Japan. She was attracted by the courage of a poor teenage fisherman, who overcame hardship during a ten-year journey exploring America with a dramatic end being awarded an unlikely honorable title as Samurai, a royal honor by inheritance. Manjiro is believed the first Japanese to set foot in America. The book highlights the peace and friendship between two nations on a civil level. Preus's other books are West of the Moon in 2014 (for ages 9–12), Shadow on the Mountain in 2012, Celebritrees: Historic & Famous Trees of the World in 2011 (for ages 4–8). The Peace Bell in 2008 (ages 4–8). Preus had previously published several books long before her name became recognizable. She wrote Visions in Near-Sleep in 1983, and had co-authored with Lise Lunge Larsen for a picture book, Legend of the Lady Slipper in 1999 (ages 4–8). She had co-authored with Ann Treacy for Sacred Words: A Collection of Prayers from Around the World in 2001 as well as co-edited together for A Book of Grace in 2002 (for young adult to adult).

== See also ==
- Children's literature
- Historical fiction
- Young adult fiction
