= Robert Yonover =

American inventor and geochemist

Robert N. Yonover is an American geochemist, volcanologist, inventor, and author. He is best known for creating the See/Rescue Streamer, which is a visual emergency signaling device that increases visibility for people lost at sea or on land. This technology has been used in military search-and-rescue applications and in a crewed SpaceX launch in 2020. Yonover appeared on the eighth season of the television series Shark Tank for this and other survival and marine-safety technologies.

== Education and scientific career ==
Yonover is a native of North Miami Beach, Florida. He studied geology at Florida State University, where he received bachelor's and master's degrees, and then attended the University of Hawaiʻi at Mānoa, where in 1989 he received a Ph.D. in geology and geophysics. His doctoral dissertation, Petrological Effects of Rift Failure at the Galapagos Spreading Center Near 95.5°W Including Analyses of Glass Inclusions by Laser Mass Spectrometry and Ion Microprobe, was an examination of volcanic material from the Galapagos Spreading Center.

His graduate research included work related to the 95.5°W Galapagos propagating rift. Yonover participated as a student researcher in a 1985 expedition involving the submersible DSV Alvin and the research vessel Atlantis II. During his doctoral training, he also held a research fellowship at NASA's Johnson Space Center and conducted laboratory work at the Massachusetts Institute of Technology.

In 1989, Yonover, John M. Sinton, Michael A. Sommer, and Everett K. Gibson published research on carbon, oxygen, and hydrogen ratios in silicate melt inclusions from basalts that were collected near the Galapagos Spreading Center in Geochimica et Cosmochimica Acta.

== Inventions and See/Rescue ==
Yonover later focused his attention on search-and-rescue and survival technology. His best-known invention is the See/Rescue Streamer, an elongated, brightly colored signaling device that makes a person easier to locate from aircraft or search vessels. Yonover filed a U.S. patent application for the visual locating device in 1993; the patent was granted in 1995. A unique feature of the device is that it uses support struts to keep the streamer extended on the surface of the water and can incorporate reflective material for increased visibility.

The RescueStreamer was developed with funding from the U.S. Department of Defense and had received military "Safe to Fly" status, according to a 2012 profile in Hawaii Business. Versions of the technology have been selected for use by the U.S. armed forces. According to a second appearance in Hawaii Business, Yonover had licensed his technology for sale to both military and civilian customers.

Yonover went on to receive U.S. patents relating to other survival and marine technologies, including inflatable watercraft, video search-and-rescue equipment, emergency flotation devices, solar water desalination and purification, and water-activated visual locating devices.

In 2019, the SAFE Association, an organization focused on safety and survival equipment, named Yonover an Honorary Life Member. He is also listed as president of its Pacific Rim Chapter.

== Shark Tank and SpaceX ==
Yonover appeared on the eighth season of ABC's Shark Tank to present the See/Rescue Streamer. He was seeking $200,000 in exchange for a 20 percent equity stake in the business, but he was not able to secure an investment from the program's “sharks.”

In 2020, a See/Rescue Streamer was carried aboard Crew Dragon Demo-2, the first commercial spacecraft launch to send American astronauts into orbit from the United States. SpaceX had contacted Yonover after the product was recommended by U.S. Air Force search-and-rescue personnel.

== Writing and caregiving ==
Yonover has written about both invention and caregiving. With author Ellie Crowe, he coauthored Hardcore Inventing: Invent, Protect, Promote, and Profit from Your Ideas, published in 2009. A revised edition was published by Skyhorse Publishing in 2014. The book focuses on Yonover's experiences developing and marketing inventions.

In 2018, he also authored The Caregiver's Survival Guide: Caring for Yourself While Caring for a Loved One. Also published by Skyhorse, it is a memoir of his time caring for his wife, who developed multiple sclerosis, while raising their two children.

His other books include the children's book Brainstorm Islands: Invent to Survive (2012), coauthored with Crowe and illustrated by Bill Schorr, and Hardcore Health: Live Young! (2019), written with Adam Crowe and Jennifer Armstrong.

== Selected works ==
- Hardcore Inventing: Invent, Protect, Promote, and Profit from Your Ideas, with Ellie Crowe (2009; revised edition 2014)
- Brainstorm Islands: Invent to Survive, with Ellie Crowe; illustrated by Bill Schorr (2012)
- The Caregiver's Survival Guide: Caring for Yourself While Caring for a Loved One, with Ellie Crowe (2018)
- Hardcore Health: Live Young!, with Adam Crowe and Jennifer Armstrong (2019)
