= Lorian Tu =

Lorian Tu is an author and illustrator of children's books. She is sometimes credited as Lorian Tu-Dean.

== Biography ==
Tu is of Chinese and Cuban descent on her father's side and white descent through her mother. She is also of Ashkenazi Jewish descent. Tu's We Are a Song (Harper, 2023), which she both wrote and illustrated, was inspired by her desire to explore her own multiracial background.

The Rice in the Pot Goes Round and Round (Orchard/Scholastic, 2021), written by Wendy Wan-Long Shang and illustrated by Tu, received a starred review from Kirkus Reviews, which said, "Tu’s illustrations elevate the joyful tone with brightly colored cartoons filled with textures and lively details".

Of We Are a Song, Kirkus Reviews said, "The story engages the senses, whether it’s the sound of oil in Amah’s wok going “ping-ping-ping,” the scent of Tía's pastries, or the sensation of a falling petal fluttering on Arturo's face like Mama's kisses. All these moments help evoke a relatable feeling of familial love".

== Selected works ==
=== As illustrator ===
- May God Bless You and Keep You. Written by Sarah Raymond Cunningham. Beaming Books, 2018.
- Dress Like a Girl. Written by Patricia Toht. Harper, 2019.
- Sky through the Storm. Written by Joanna Rowland. Beaming Books, 2019.
- Sophie and the Tiny Dognapping. Written by Jamie Michalak. Charlesbridge, 2021.
- The Rice in the Pot Goes Round and Round. Written by Wendy Wan-Long Shang. Orchard/Scholastic, 2021.

==== Chicken Soup for the Soul Kids series ====
- The Sunshine Squad: Discovering What Makes You Special. Written by Jamie Michalak. Charlesbridge, 2021.
- Oliver Powers through: A Book about Helping out around the House. Written by JaNay Brown-Wood. Illustrated by Lorian Tu & Jenna Nahyun Chung. Charlesbridge, 2022.

=== As illustrator and author ===
- We Are a Song. Harper, 2023.
