= The Astonishing Color of After =

2018 young adult novel by Emily X. R. Pan

- Author: Emily X.R. Pan
- Language: English
- Genre: Fiction
- Publisher: Little, Brown Books for Young Readers
- Publication date: March 20, 2018
- Publication place: United States
- Pages: 480
- ISBN: 9780316463997

The Astonishing Color of After is a young adult novel by Emily X.R. Pan, published March 20, 2018 by Little, Brown Books for Young Readers. The novel addresses topics including suicide and mental health through the story of a biracial teenager, Leigh, in search of her mother, whom Leigh believes has transformed into a red bird following her suicide. She follows the bird to Taiwan, her mother’s birthplace, where she meets her grandparents for the first time and tries to learn what the bird is trying to teach her before the end of the traditional Ghost Month. Throughout the story, Leigh uses colors to describe emotions and her art as a way to process her grief. Meanwhile, she is also in conflict with her father, who does not believe she is handling her grief well and also thinks she should be pursuing something more practical than art.

The Astonishing Color of After’s Asian-American cultural representation, as well as depiction of topics such as mental health and teen suicide, has led to critical and scholarly discussion of the novel's pedagogical value.

TIME included The Astonishing Color of After on its list "The 100 Best YA Books of All Time."

== Plot summary ==
At the novel’s opening, Leigh states that her mother Dory has turned into a red bird after her suicide, after leaving a note with the crossed-out statement: “I want you to remember”. Leigh experiences trauma from these events and feels that she cannot confide in her best friend Axel. This is because, in Leigh’s mind, their friendship has become complicated because she kissed him on the same day of her mother’s suicide. Leigh is an artist and relies only on pencils and charcoal, refusing to add colors to her artwork.

Leigh’s father, Brian, refuses to believe that her mother has turned into a red bird, even after a bird visits their home. Leigh’s father nonetheless buys her tickets to meet Leigh’s Taiwanese grandparents, Waipo and Waigong (grandmother and grandfather in Mandarin, respectively). Dory’s estrangement from her parents led her to not teach Leigh Mandarin, so there is an immediate language barrier between her and her grandparents. Leigh learns that her grandparents burned the box the red bird had brought her. Additionally, her father gets into an argument with Waipo and leaves for Hong Kong.

Leigh meets an English speaker named Feng who is a close friend of the family. Leigh also burns incense that allows her to see her parents’ memories. At night, she begins to burn special incense and items that mean something to the owner to see memories of the past, such as photographs, a necklace, or a letter. These memories include those of her parents, her grandparents, and herself. Occasionally, she thinks of Axel and events that took place over her freshman year of high school, such as him asking out one of their classmates, Leanne.

Desperate to find the red bird, Leigh asks to go to her mother’s favorite places. Leigh, Feng, and Waipo travel to many of these destinations. At one point, a frustrated Leigh yells at Feng to leave, but quickly regrets this and finds Feng to apologize. Throughout these travels, Leigh continues to see memories of her family’s past including recollections of her aunt Jingling who died of an aneurysm in college. This is revealed to be one of the reasons that Dory left Taiwan. Leigh also has memories of her increasingly confusing friendship with Axel as the two share many close moments despite his relationship with Leanne. Leigh remembers how Dory had struggled with growing depression and with her father spending most of his time away on business, Leigh had difficulty adapting to it.

After numerous attempts to see the red bird and as she experiences insomnia and recalls the memories of her loved ones, Leigh begins to see cracks in her dreamscape world. She calls her father back and tries to show him, Waipo, and Waigong the same memories that she had been seeing. When she wakes back up, the cracks are gone and she reconnects with her father. She then learns that Feng was the ghost of Jingling, who has finally passed on. The family spreads Jingling and Dory’s ashes together. Once Leigh and her father are home in America, she learns that she has been chosen to showcase her artwork in Germany and her father affirms to her they are going together. She creates art based on the memories she was shown, using colors in her drawings for the first time.

== Background ==
Emily X.R. Pan was raised in Illinois by her Taiwanese and Chinese American parents and closely collaborated with her extended family in Taiwan while researching and writing the novel. Although the novel is not explicitly autobiographical, Pan echoes certain details of her like Leigh being the only child of a professor and a piano teacher. In an interview, Pan detailed how she drew inspiration from her own grandmother’s life to create Leigh’s mother’s story. In an interview with the School Library Journal, Pan shared that similar to Leigh, she lost a family member to suicide and has experienced firsthand the effects of depression. In the novel's "Author’s Note" section, Pan emphasizes that “it was important to me that while Leigh’s mother had experienced some terrible things in her life, there wasn’t a reason to explain her having depression”.

== Themes ==
=== Mental health, suicide, and grief ===
The Booklist praised Pan's "...sensitive treatment of mental illness: Leigh learns many heartbreaking things about her mother's life, but those moments are never offered as explanations for suicide; rather, it's the result of her mother's lifelong struggle with severe, debilitating depression".

The book-reviewing blog The Quiet Pond analyzed Pan’s mystic imagery as parallelling Leigh’s struggle to grieve and her desperate search to find the red bird. The Harvard Crimson found Pan’s attention to depression “sensitive” and that her depiction of its “irrevocable consequences” to Dory made clear that she suffered “a relentless illness, not a set of causes or circumstances”. This is prevalent in Leigh’s descriptions of her mother: “Long before I lost my mother…She was already hurting”.

=== Family relationships ===
The Quiet Pond further analyzed that Leigh’s dreamlike visions allow the reader to learn about “pain hidden away” about her family’s past, why her mother refused to return to Taiwan, and the reasons behind the conflict between her father and mother’s parents. The book-reviewing blog Rich in Color discussed how Leigh can find value in connections to process her grief:

Leigh has lost her mom, her dad is withdrawn, and her relationship with Axel has splintered. This is why new connections with her grandparents and the hunt for her mother in the form of a bird are so important. Leigh feels lost and alone, but learning about her mother’s family and seeking answers helps Leigh work her way through grief and teaches her about love.

=== Asian-American identity and belonging ===
Freelance writer Lydia Tewkesbury commented on the complex duality of Leigh’s mixed racial identity: “Leigh is of mixed race, and often called “exotic” by her white peers in America. In Taiwan, she's dismayed to find that she is exoticized in much the same manner as in the US – people point and whisper, hunxie, a word she soon learns describes someone biracial". Tewkesbury concludes that contributing to Leigh’s ambiguous sense of racial identity is the centrality of language to feeling belongingness; Leigh’s language barrier between her English-speaking self and her Mandarin-speaking grandparents contributes to alienation, isolation, and loneliness.

The Quiet Pond writes that the novel’s dual narrative setting in Taiwan, both in the past and present, “highlights the contrasting socio-emotional landscape of Leigh’s identity”, which contributes to the theme of Asian-American identity and belonging.

== Critical pedagogical value ==
Scholars of educational pedagogy Laurie Sharp and Robin Johnson list The Astonishing Color of After as a novel that can be included in the classroom to diversify the children’s literature spectrum and instill culturally relevant pedagogy. Sharp and Johnson cite Gloria Ladson-Billings' description of culturally relevant pedagogy as aiming to “‘empower students to examine critically the society in which they live and to work for social change’”. Sharp and Johnson value novels like The Astonishing Color of After as they showcase the cultural experiences of historically underrepresented populations, and integrating these texts in classrooms helps students “overcome cultural inequalities through the inclusion of diverse children’s literature”.

Educators and scholars Boyd, et al discuss the value of culturally diverse literature pieces like The Astonishing Color of After to encourage their students to analyze injustices and cultural nuances within pieces of literature that demonstrate stories that don’t reflect the white Eurocentric norm. They express a need for a greater representation of books in the classroom that represent an increasingly diverse population, with diverse lifestyles, beliefs, and cultures.

Using Emily X.R. Pan’s novel as an example, scholar Michelle Falkoff examines the pros and cons of assigning books in school that depict suicide, especially the danger of ambiguous depictions read without critical discussion. Falkoff asserts that novels that address these complex topics require guidance, for while they may provide valuable insight for students to gain conscientiousness and compassion, they may create an unhealthy obsession with suicide. She concludes that educators’ positionality is therefore vital in critically analyzing and guiding their students through suicide-topic novels to help build empathy and awareness.

== Reception ==
The Astonishing Color of After was a New York Times and IndieBound best seller.

The book received starred reviews from Booklist and Publishers Weekly, as well as positive reviews from The New York Times Book Review, Bustle, and Kirkus.

Meg Medina of The New York Times Book Review called the book "lyrical and suspenseful."

Publishers Weekly wrote, "The subtlety and ambiguity of the supernatural elements place this story in the realm of magical realism, full of ghosts and complex feelings and sending an undeniable message about the power of hope and inner strength."

Kirkus called the book "[a]n evocative novel that captures the uncertain, unmoored feeling of existing between worlds—culturally, linguistically, ethnically, romantically, and existentially—it is also about seeking hope and finding beauty even in one’s darkest hours."

TIME included The Astonishing Color of After on its list "The 100 Best YA Books of All Time." Bustle and Paste named it one of the best young adult books of 2018.

The Horn Book Magazine praised Pan’s portrayal of Leigh as a visual artist, who told her story with "a vividness punctuated by a host of highly specific hues: a 'cerise punch' to the gut, 'viridian spiraling' thoughts, a heart 'bursting with manganese blue and new gamboges yellow and quinacridone rose.'” Pan’s use of Taiwanese mysticism, such as the ghosts (gui) among the living creates a “hypnotic” narrative.

=== Awards and honors ===
In 2018, The Astonishing Color of After was a Booklist Editors' Choice: Books for Youth selection. The following year, it was selected for the American Library Association's "Outstanding Books for the College Bound: Arts & Humanities" list.

Awards and honors for The Astonishing Color of After
Year	Award/Honor	Result	Ref.
2019	Asian/Pacific American Award for Literature	Honor book	
2019	Walter Dean Myers Award	Honor	
2019	YALSA Amazing Audiobooks for Young Adults	Selection	

=== 2018 ALA controversy ===
In January 2019, the American Library Association (ALA) named the 2018 awardees of the Youth Media Awards in a broadcast ceremony. However, no honor books were mentioned, including Pan’s The Astonishing Color of After.

On Twitter, Pan vocalized how the lack of recognition conveyed the ALA’s surface-level allyship to diverse authors and stories: “ALA announced that they were going to make a point about the importance of books by diverse authors / about diverse cultures by highlighting the APALA, AJL, and AILA’s selections in the 2019 awards”. “To emphasize the importance of celebrating diversity and abolishing cultural invisibility– and then to decide that those awards would simply be truncated? Was the hope that nobody would notice?” “Was that 2018 announcement about the inclusion of these awards just another performance of allyship? And what a sting, too, for those committees who worked so hard on their selections, excited for the mark they would make in support of these marginalized identities”.

The ALA responded that the event timing barred those novels’ recognition and that they did not intentionally try to disrespect unmentioned authors. In reporting on the controversy, Elissa Gershowitz and Martha Parravano of The Horn Book inc. asserted that more voices in conversions surrounding equity and conclusion in children’s literature are what is needed for scholarship and young people.
