= Gina Chung =

American writer

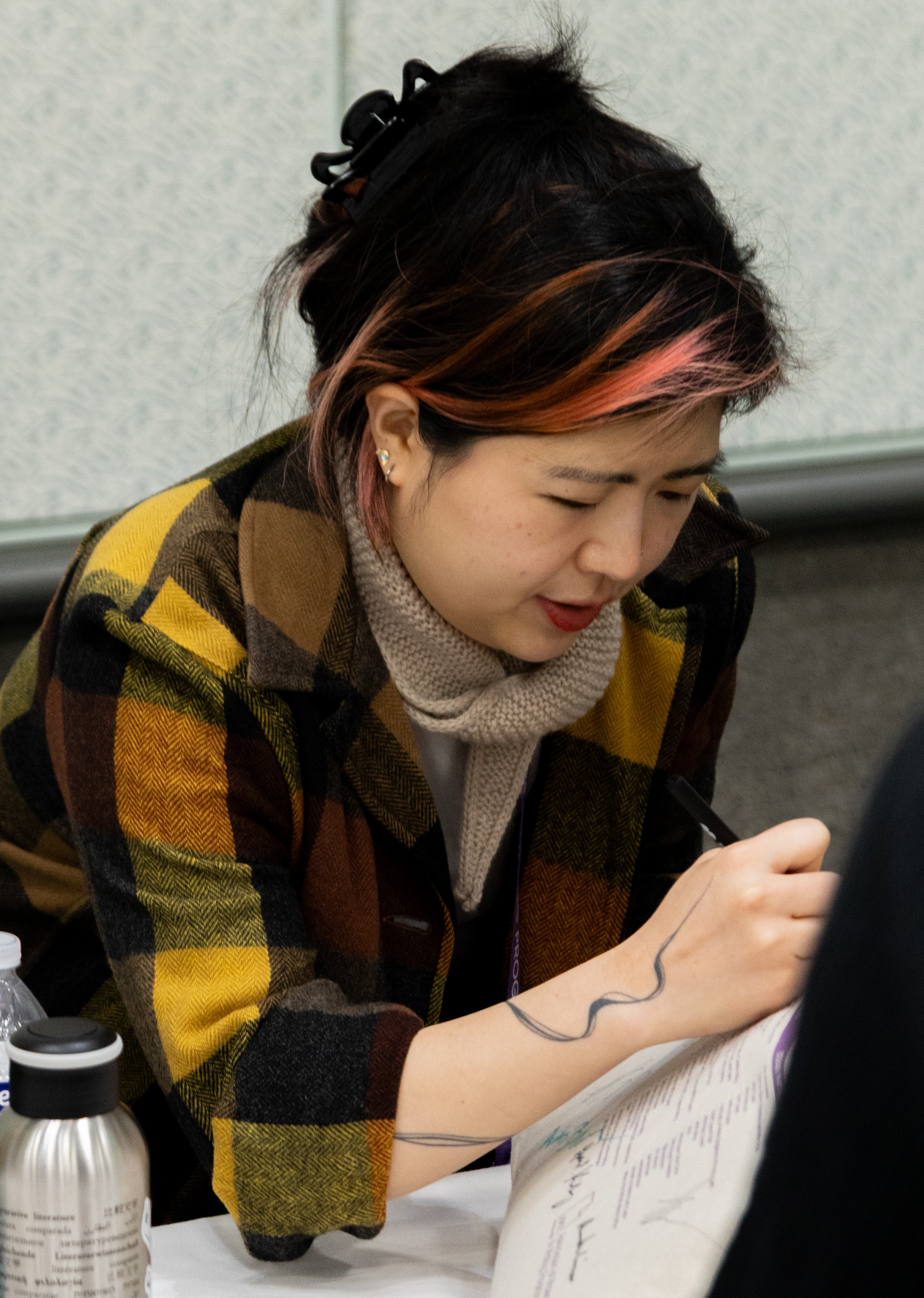
- Chung at AWP 2025
- Education: The New School (MFA)
- Occupation: Writer

Gina Chung is an American writer. In 2023, she published her debut novel, Sea Change, with Vintage, and in 2024, Vintage published her short story collection, Green Frog. She graduated from The New School with an MFA in fiction in 2021 and was a 2021 Center for Fiction Emerging Writer Fellow.

== Early life ==
Chung was born in Queens, but her parents, Korean immigrants, moved to New Jersey with her shortly after. Chung's family lived in a predominantly white part of the area, but they frequently visited the Korean American part of town on weekends and for church. In Electric Literature, Chung recalled the "cultural whiplash" of seeing one community on the weekdays in school versus another community on the weekends.

== Career ==
Chung's writing has been published in BOMB Magazine, One Story, Split Lip, Wigleaf, Catapult, and others. Her Wigleaf story, "Mantis", won a Pushcart Prize and was later published in The Pushcart Prize XLVII: Best of the Small Presses 2023 Edition.

Chung attended the MFA program at The New School and graduated in 2021. There, she worked on various short stories—some of which would later be included in her 2024 release, Green Frog—as well as the manuscript for her debut novel, Sea Change, which was her thesis despite not initially intending to write a novel during her studies. In 2021, Chung was awarded a Center for Fiction Emerging Writer Fellowship. A year later, in 2022, Chung was hired as a programs manager at Kundiman. Previously, Chung worked at PEN America.

In March 2023, Chung published Sea Change with Vintage. Chung stated that she had finished the first manuscript in a few months in 2020. It was longlisted for the Center for Fiction First Novel Prize and earned numerous other accolades including becoming a Barnes & Noble Discover Pick and an Asian Pacific American Librarians Association Adult Fiction Honor Book. In March 2024, Chung released a short story collection, Green Frog, with Vintage, which went on to become a Good Morning America Book Buzz Pick. The same year, Chung judged the Masters Review Best Emerging Writers contest.

== Personal life ==
She is bisexual.

== Bibliography ==
Type	Title	Year	Publisher	ISBN	Ref.
Novel	Sea Change	2023	Vintage	ISBN 978-0593469347	
Short story collection	Green Frog: Stories	2024	Vintage	ISBN 978-0593469361	
