= Emily X.R. Pan =

American writer

- Born: Illinois, U.S.
- Education: New York University Stern School of Business
- Writing career
- Years active: 2017–present
- Genre: Young adult fiction
- Notable work: The Astonishing Color of After
- Notable awards: 2017 Asian/Pacific American Award for Young Adult Literature
- Website: exrpan.com

Emily X.R. Pan is a New York Times Bestselling American author of young adult fiction, best known for her debut novel The Astonishing Color of After.

== Personal life ==
Pan was born in Illinois and is the only child of Taiwanese parents who immigrated to the United States. Her father is a professor at The College of New Jersey and her mother is a piano and guzheng teacher.

She attempted to write her first novel in second grade and ultimately finished her first novel for a sixth grade assignment at school. By 15, she was querying literary agents to pursue publication. Pan studied International Marketing at NYU Stern, where she graduated a semester early. After graduation, she worked in digital advertising before getting accepted into NYU's Creative Writing program, where she became editor-in-chief at the Washington Square Review. In 2010, while in grad school, she developed the idea for what would become her debut novel and kept rewriting and putting it aside in favor of different manuscripts.

She lives in Brooklyn, New York.

== Career ==
Pan's debut novel, The Astonishing Color of After, was published by Little, Brown in March 2018 and debuted on the New York Times Bestseller List at #10. The novel follows 15-year old Leigh, who deals with her mother's recent death by suicide through traveling to Taiwan and meeting her maternal grandparents. Believing that her mother has been turned into a great red bird, she tries to find clues in her family history to uncover her mother's secrets.

Pan wrote the novel as a tribute to her grandmother, inspired by her life in colonial Taiwan. Originally it was planned to be historical fiction, set in 1927, and span over 40 years of a Taiwanese woman's life, but Pan ultimately opted for a contemporary setting. To write the novel, Pan traveled to Taiwan for research, and rewrote the novel over a period of seven years.

Together with fellow author Nova Ren Suma, Pan is the co-founder of Foreshadow: A Serial Anthology, a monthly online anthology for young adult short stories, which was realized via the crowdfunding site Indiegogo in August 2018.

Her second novel, An Arrow to the Moon, was released in April 2022. It was named to NPR's Best Books of 2022 and The Horn Book's Fanfare list of the best of 2022, and was a 2023 Locus Award Finalist.

== Awards ==
Won

- 2019 Asian/Pacific American Award for Young Adult Literature
- 2019 Walter Honor Award
- 2020 Lincoln Award

Nominated

- 2018 Los Angeles Times Book Prize for Young Adult Literature
- 2018 Goodreads Choice Award for Young Adult Fiction and for Debut Author

== Bibliography ==
- An Arrow to the Moon, 2022
- Foreshadow: Stories to Celebrate the Magic of Reading and Writing YA
- The Astonishing Color of After, 2018
