= Kelly Yang =

Asian American writer (born 1984)

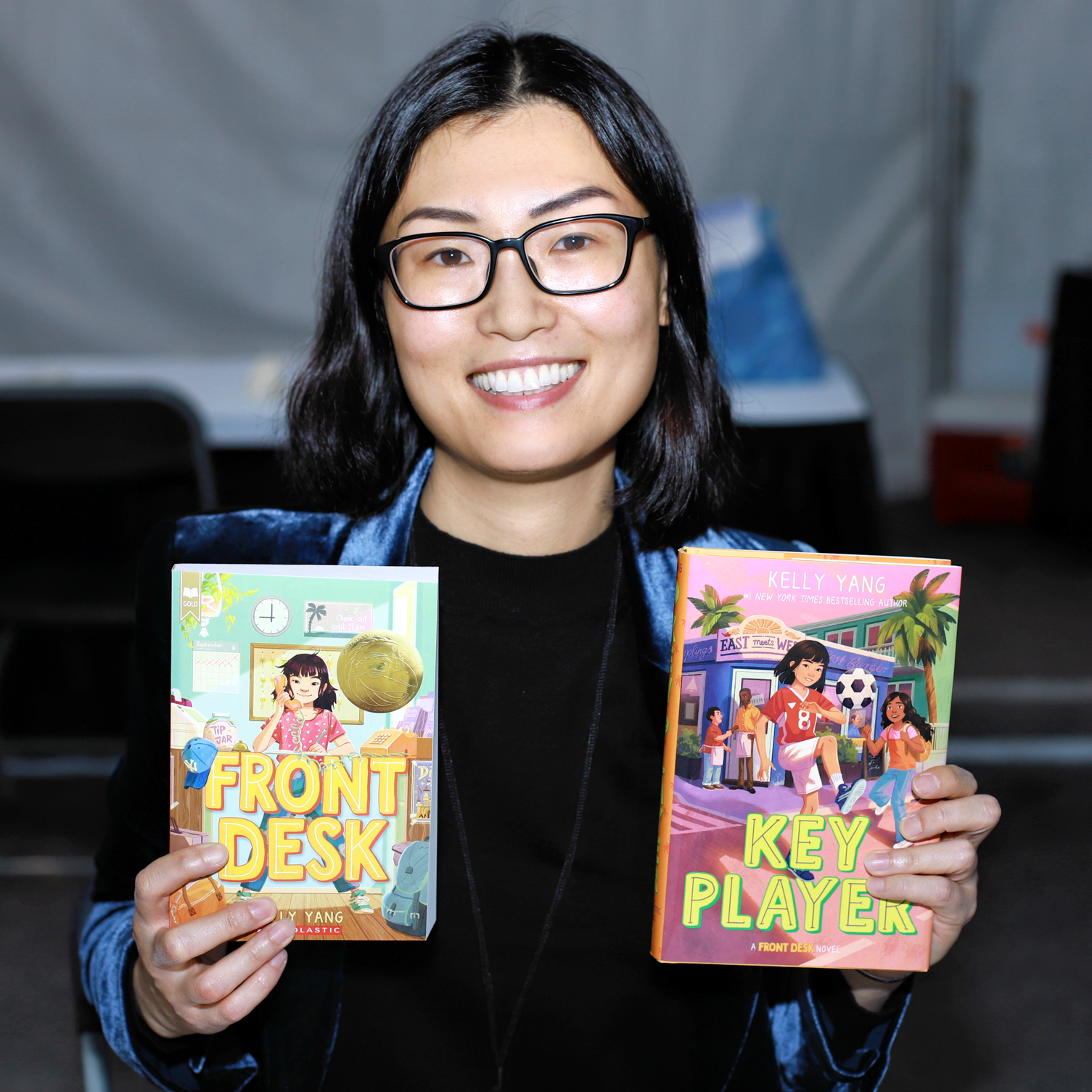
- Yang in 2022 with two of her children's books
- Born: August 29, 1984 (age 42); Hong Kong
- Education: University of California, Berkeley (Bachelor's degree); Harvard Law School (JD)
- Occupations: novelist, political columnist
- Children: 3
- Writing career
- Genres: Children's literature; Young adult literature; Literary fiction
- Notable works: Front Desk, New From Here
- Notable awards: 2018 Parents' Choice Gold Medal for Fiction; 2019 Asian/Pacific American Award for Literature
- Website: kellyyang.com

Kelly Yang (born August 29, 1984) is an Asian American writer known primarily for her novels for children. She won the 2018 Parents' Choice Gold Medal for Fiction and the 2019 Asian/Pacific American Award for Literature for her first novel, Front Desk, and has since also written fiction for young adults and adults.

== Biography ==
Yang was born in Hong Kong and immigrated to the United States with her family when she was six. At ten, she was working the front desk at her family's motel in Southern California. She entered California State University, Los Angeles at the age of 13, transferred two years later to the University of California, Berkeley, and graduated with a bachelor's degree in political science in 2002. She then went on to Harvard Law School, where she received a Juris Doctor degree at the age of 20, but decided not to practice law.

Yang served as an editorial columnist for the South China Morning Post in Hong Kong from 2010 to 2018 and also founded an after-school writing program for children called The Kelly Yang Project. She later returned to coaching children in writing online during the COVID-19 pandemic.

She published her first book, Front Desk, in 2018. For middle-grade readers, it is based on her experience managing her parents' motel and won the 2018 Parents' Choice Gold Medal for Fiction and the 2019 Asian/Pacific American Award for Literature. She followed it with several sequels: Three Keys in 2020, Room to Dream in 2021, Key Player in 2022, Top Story in 2023, and Chef's Secret in 2025. Front Desk was optioned for a movie and Yang worked on a screenplay, but the movie was not made. Finally Seen (2023) and Finally Heard (2024) constitute a separate series about a girl who comes to the United States from China to rejoin her family after five years and in the sequel, is navigating adolescence and social media. New From Here (2022) was written during and about the first year of the COVID-19 pandemic and won a 2025 California Young Reader Medal at the intermediate level. Her forthcoming Boss Games is the first of three middle-grades novels for Macmillan Publishers.

Her 2020 young adult book Parachutes is about anti-Asian racism and sexual assault at an elite private school, and based on her own experiences at Harvard Law School.

Her first adult novel, The Take, was published in 2026, and is about a young Chinese-American woman who is paid to exchange her blood with a middle-aged white Hollywood producer in an experimental age-reversal treatment.

On January 2, 2026, Yang announced a new podcast with fellow author Kate DiCamillo, Storykind, intended for children aged 8 and older, parents, teachers, and librarians.

== Personal life ==
Yang is married and has three children, with whom she moved from Hong Kong to the United States in early 2020 because of the COVID-19 pandemic. Her husband rejoined them 18 months later.

She has talked about how being tall—over 5 ft 7–in—helped her fit in in college despite her youth. In 2020 she wrote about being sexually assaulted by a classmate at Harvard and pressured by the administration to abandon her complaint. She has also talked and written about experiencing anti-Asian racism in the United States and about conservative hostility to books like hers that portray minorities and LGBTQ+ people sympathetically.

== Books ==
=== Children's fiction ===
- Front Desk (2018) [Front Desk #1]
- Three Keys (2020) [Front Desk #2]
- Room to Dream (2021) [Front Desk #3]
- New From Here (2022)
- Key Player (2022) [Front Desk #4]
- Private Label (2022)
- Yes We Will (2022)
- Finally Seen (2023)
- Top Story (2023) [Front Desk #5]
- Finally Heard (2024)
- Chef's Secret (2025) [Front Desk #6]

=== Young adult fiction ===
- Parachutes (2020)

=== Adult fiction ===
- The Take (2026)
