= Juna's Jar =

2015 picture book written by Jane Bahk and illustrated by Felicia Hoshino

- Author: Jane Bahk
- Illustrator: Felicia Hoshino
- Language: English
- Genre: Children's picture book
- Publisher: Lee & Low Books
- Publication date: 2015
- Publication place: United States
- Pages: 32
- Awards: Asian/Pacific American Awards for Literature; New Voices Award
- ISBN: 978-1-6006-0853-7

Juna's Jar is a children's picture book written by Jane Bahk and with illustrations by Felicia Hoshino. The book tells the story of Juna, a little girl whose best friend left to live somewhere else. Through her imagination, she finds solitude by filling an old kimchi jar with a variety of things.

Bahk's debut book was published in 2015 by Lee & Low Books after winning the publisher's "New Voices Award". Juna's Jar received positive reviews by critics, both due to Hoshino's watercolor paintings as well for Bahk's writing, and was also the recipient of an award by the Asian/Pacific American Librarians Association.

== Plot ==
Juna, a Korean-American girl, is best friends with Hector, her neighbor in Koreatown. The two kids would usually play together in a park nearby, which included collecting interesting objects and insects they found during their time playing. They stored these items in Juna's old kimchi jar, and then released after observing them.

One day, Juna found out Hector is no longer living with his grandmother, and was sent to live with his parents in a far away place, without saying goodbye. Her older brother, Minho, to help her, adds a variety of things to the jar each day (a small fish, some twigs, a bean plant), and each night Juna goes on a journey inside it, looking for Hector.

== Inspiration ==
The story of Juna's Jar is based both on Bahk's experiences during childhood as well as her husband's. As a child, Bahk would collect insects and other small critters in kimchi jars and build habitats for them. Bahk's husband grew up in Los Angeles' Koreatown, where the story is set, and he used to have a childhood friend called Hector, who moved away. While her husband lived in a diverse place, Bahk was the only Korean child in her school.

== Reception ==
Juna's Jar received generally positive reviews by critics. The Horn Book Magazine said its "[s]oft, whimsical watercolors contrast Juna's ordinary days and exciting nights." Susan Scheps, for the School Library Journal, also praised Hoshino's illustrations, and called the book a "sweet story that tugs at the imagination". The Booklist's April Mazza said the "story's fantastical qualities are charmingly conveyed by the expressive pastel-watercolor illustrations," and mentioned the "effortlessly multicultural" aspect present in the book.

The writer for Kirkus Reviews noted the repetition the story brought through its narrative, where every night Juna went into a different adventure in her imagination, and said it "offers a reassuring pattern for children who might be missing their own Hectors." They found the overall story to be "logically shaky", but praised Hoshido's "muted tones" and watercolors, which "soothe and, on occasion, amuse" the readers.

In an analysis of the story, Linda Sue Park noted Minho's importance to the plot, but that the "lack of response from Juna to his kindness makes him a less dimensional character than he might have been." She also commented on Hoshino's watercolors, calling them "lyrical and delicately detailed", which helped convey Juna's emotions in the text. Park, who also analyzed Matt de la Peña's Last Stop on Market Street, commented on the similarities between the main characters of these books and Peter, from Ezra Jack Keats' The Snowy Day: "their ethnicity is part of their identity without being the story's central issue."

In 2010, Juna's Jar was awarded Lee & Low Books "New Voices Awards". Through the award, Bahk received a thousand dollars and a publication contract as prize. The book was also the recipient of the 2015-2016 Asian/Pacific American Awards for Literature in the "Picture Book" category.
