= Krys Lee =

South Korean writer, journalist, and translator

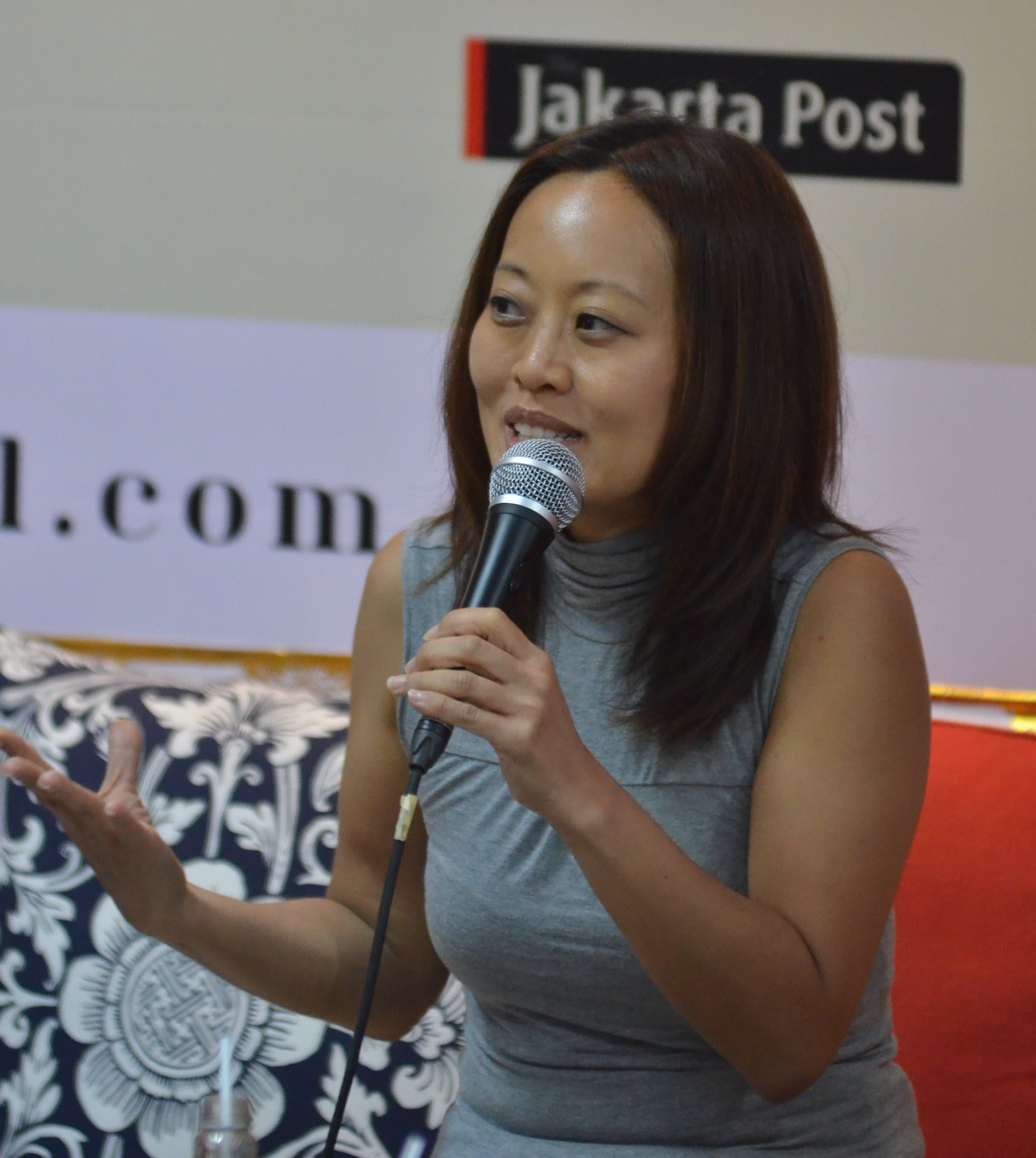
- Website: www.kryslee.com

Krys Lee is a South Korean writer, journalist, and translator. She wrote the short story collection Drifting House (2012) and the novel How I Became a North Korean (2016). She is an associate professor of creative writing and literature at Underwood International College, Yonsei University. She was awarded the Rome Prize, the Story Prize Spotlight Award, and the Honor Title in Adult Fiction Literature from the Asian/Pacific American Librarians Association, and was a finalist for the Center for Fiction First Novel Prize and the BBC International Story Prize.

== Personal life ==
Lee was born in South Korea, was raised and educated in California and Washington, then the United Kingdom, and now lives in Seoul. She received her BA in English Literature from UCLA, her MA in English Literature from University of York, and her MFA in creative writing from Warren Wilson College.

Her work has been published on Granta, The Kenyon Review, Narrative, San Francisco Chronicle, Corriere della Sera, and The Guardian.

In 2012, Lee published her debut collection of short stories, Drifting House, from Viking, Penguin Random House. In 2016 she published her novel How I Became a North Korean, also from Viking, Penguin Random House. Lee is also the translator of I Hear Your Voice (Mariner Books, 2017) and Diary of a Murderer: And Other Stories (Houghton-Mifflin Harcourt, 2019) by Young-ha Kim.

== Awards and fellowships ==
- Story Prize Spotlight Award (2012)
- BBC International Short Story Award, Short List (2012)
- Pushcart Prize, special mention (2012)
- iTunes Book of the Month selection (2012)
- Asian/Pacific American Librarians Association, Honor Title in Adult Fiction Literature (2012)
- American Academy of Arts and Letters Rome Prize fellowship in literature (2014)
- Center for Fiction First Novel Prize, finalist

== Works ==
- Drifting House (Viking, Penguin Random House, 2012)
- How I Became North Korean (Viking, Penguin Random House, 2016)
- I Hear Your Voice (Mariner Books, 2017), translator
- Diary of a Murderer: And Other Stories (Houghton-Mifflin Harcourt, 2019), translator
