= Sonora Review =

University of Arizona literary magazine

- Editor: Hayeon Lee
- Categories: Literary magazine
- Frequency: Biannually
- Publisher: University of Arizona
- First issue: 1980
- Country: United States
- Based in: Tucson, Arizona
- Language: English
- Website: sonorareview.com
- ISSN: 0275-5203

Sonora Review is a biannual graduate student-run literary magazine that was established in the fall of 1980. Sonora Review publishes fiction, non-fiction, and poetry, as well as interviews, book reviews, and art. Each issue is produced by graduate student volunteers in the Creative Writing Department at the University of Arizona. Former staff members include Antonya Nelson, Robert Boswell, Richard Russo, Tony Hoagland, and David Foster Wallace. Work originally printed in the Sonora Review has appeared in Best of the West and Best American Poetry, and has won O. Henry Awards and Pushcart Prizes. The editor-in-chief is Hayeon Lee.

== Sonora Review Contest winners ==
Each spring, the magazine awards a writing prize. Outside judges choose the winners, who each receive $1,000 and are published in the magazine.

== See also ==
- List of literary magazines
