= Ellie Crowe =

Ellie Crowe is a South African-born author of more than sixteen books. She now lives in the United States, in Honolulu, Hawaii and Santa Barbara, California. Her books on the culture and history of Hawaii include Exploring Lost Hawaii, Places of Power, History, Mystery and Magic, Kamehameha: the Boy who became a Warrior King, recipient of the HVCB Kahili Award for Literary Arts in 2004, and Surfer of the Century: the Life of Duke Kahanamoku, recipient of the Simon Wiesenthal Museum of Tolerance Once Upon a World Award in Children's Literature in 2008. Her first book, The Little Princess Kaiulani, is included in a time capsule in the grounds of the Princess Victoria Kaiulani Elementary School, Honolulu.

== Books ==
=== Invention and business ===
- Hardcore Inventing, Invent, Protect, Promote and Profit by Robert Yonover and Ellie Crowe (2009)

=== Travel and cultural guides ===
- Exploring Lost Hawaii, Places of Power, History, Mystery and Magic (2001)
- Hawaii, a Pictorial Celebration (2006)

=== Biographies for middle-school ===
- Kamehameha the Boy Who Became a Warrior King (2003)
- Duke's Olympic Feet (2008)
- Surfer of the Century, The Life of Duke Kahanamoku (2008)

=== Children's books ===
- Little Princess Kaiulani in her Garden by the Sea (2000)
- The Littlest Paniolo (2001)
- The Boy Who Tricked the Ghosts (2003)
- Magic Moon Dreams (2004)
- Touch and See Sea Shore (2004)
- Touch and See Rainforest (2004)
- See Under the Sea (2005)
- See Under the Deep Blue Sea Whale Tale (2006)
- Hoku the Stargazer The Exciting Pirate Adventure (2008)
- Go to Sleep Hide and Seek (2010)

== Awards ==
- Hawaii Tourism Association Award for Excellence I Literature (2002)
- Five awards for literary excellence in Literature from the Hawaii Book Publishers Association (2004)
- The Kahili Award in Literary Arts (2004)
- 2008 Asian/Pacific American Award for Children's Literature
- 2008 Simon Wiesenthal Museum of Tolerance Once Upon a World Award
- 2008 Carter G. Woodson Award
- Bank Street College Books of the Year 2008
- The Bloomsbury Review Editors Favorite
- Cleveland Public Library Distinguished Children's Biography List 2008
- Texas Women's University Librarians' Choice 2008
- Starred review from School Library Journal 2008
- Kiriyama Notable Books 2008
- BookList Best Children's Books 2008
- Texas Bluebonnet Master List 2010/2011 selection
