= Barbara Kawakami =

Japanese- American writer (1921–2024)

- Born: August 24, 1921; Kumamoto, Japan
- Died: December 20, 2024 (aged 103); Honolulu, Hawaii, U.S.
- Other names: Fusako Oyama
- Occupations: Scholar, author, storyteller

Barbara Oyama Kawakami (August 24, 1921 – December 20, 2024) was a Japanese-born American author, storyteller and scholar specializing in Japanese immigrant clothing and Hawaiian plantation life.

== Early life ==
Kawakami was born Fusako Oyama in Kumamoto, Japan. She immigrated to Hawaii with her family in 1921 when she was 3 months old.

Her father died when she was six years old. Kawakami's mother was pregnant with her ninth child at the time of his death.

Kawakami grew up on the Oahu Sugar Plantation in Waipahu where her mother worked. She attended school until 8th grade. Her English teacher noted her academic abilities and encouraged her to attend high school. She declined and instead enrolled in sewing school to learn a skill that would help contribute to family expenses.

== Career ==
Kawakami worked for over three decades as a dressmaker. She later received her General Equivalency Diploma (GED) and entered college at age 53 where she earned a BS in Fashion Design and Merchandising and an MA in Asian studies.

During her research, Kawakami noted a lack of information about clothing worn by Japanese immigrants on Hawaiian plantations. In 1979, she began interviewing plantation workers and compiling a collection of clothes and photographs. Her collection of Issei clothing is considered the most significant collection of its kind. Items from the collection are available to view digitally through the Japanese American National Museum in Los Angeles, CA.

Kawakami has been a researcher, writer, and consultant on projects, including the film Picture Bride, released by Miramax Pictures in 1994. Her book, Japanese Immigrant Clothing in Hawaii 1885–1941, was published in 1993. She published Picture Bride Stories in 2017.

== Personal life ==
Kawakami was married to Douglas Kawakami. They had three children. Kawakami died on December 20, 2024, at the age of 103.
