= Front Desk (book) =

2018 middle grade book by Kelly Yang

- First edition cover
- Author: Kelly Yang
- Language: English
- Series: Front Desk
- Genre: Middle grade fiction
- Publisher: Scholastic
- Publication date: May 29, 2018
- Publication place: United States
- Pages: 304
- Awards: Asian/Pacific American Award for Literature
- ISBN: 978-1-338-15779-6
- Followed by: Three Keys
- Website: https://frontdeskthebook.com

Front Desk is a middle grade book written by Kelly Yang as her debut novel, and published by Scholastic in 2018. This book is the first of a six-book series.

== Plot ==
Ten-year-old Mia Tang and her family, who, after a couple years struggling financially, are hired to manage a motel.The family is hired by the owner of the Calivista, Mr. Yao. Although originally seeming alright, he's later revealed to be a penny-pinching liar. Mia gains the friendship of the "weeklies" and is eventually able to buy the motel with the help of the community.

== Reception ==
Front Desk received starred reviews from the School Library Journal and Kirkus Reviews. Katya Schapiro, who reviewed for the SLJ, commented on the "light, positive tone" Yang maintains in the book about the heavy themes, as well as the "satisfying dose of wish fulfillment that closes the story". Schapiro praised Mia's character, calling her "an irresistible protagonist," and said "many young readers will see themselves in Mia and her friends." Kirkus Reviews called the main character "a feisty and empowered heroine", and also praised the supporting characters that help "reveal life in America in the 1990s for persons of color and those living in poverty."

Writing for The Horn Book, Roxanne Hsu Feldman says "[r]eaders will admire Mia for her audacity and her creativity in finding solutions for seemingly insurmountable situations." Feldman also notes how despite the story being set in 1990s United States is still "relevant to 2018 America." In a review by Publishers Weekly, Front Desk's story is called "one of indefatigable hope and of triumph over injustice, and [Mia's] voice is genuine and inspiring."

The book was awarded the 2019 Asian/Pacific American Award for Literature in the "Children's Literature" category.

== Challenges ==
During the Banned Books Week of 2021, Front Desk was temporarily banned in the Plainedge Union Free School District, New York. According to Yang, a parent wrote a letter saying the book was being used to teach critical race theory to the students, as well as portraying police officers as racists. The book was not removed from the school's library, and was allowed again to be used for read aloud, but parents were given the possibility to opt-out their children from reading Front Desk.

This was the second time the book was challenged, as it had previously been present in a list of banned books of the Central York High School alongside more than 300 other "anti-racist resources". This first ban was reversed in September 2021, almost a year after it had begun.

== Graphic novel ==
A graphic novel adaptation illustrated by Fumio Obata and Clar Angkasa was published by Graphix in October 2026.
