= Margi Preus =

American children's writer

- Education: Binghamton University
- Occupation: Writer
- Writing career
- Genre: Children's literature
- Website: www.margipreus.com

Margi Preus is an American children's writer. She is a 2011 Newbery Honor winner and won the Asian/Pacific American Award for Literature for Heart of a Samurai. Her books have won multiple awards, honored as ALA/ALSC Notables, landed on many "best of" lists, featured on NPR, chosen for community reads, and translated into many languages.

She earned her undergraduate degree at Luther College and graduate degree from Binghamton University. She taught at the College of St. Scholastica, University of Minnesota Duluth. She lives in Duluth, Minnesota.

Margi Preus was a runner up for the 2011 Newbery medal and won the Asian/Pacific American award for literature. She was nominated for the Minnesota Book Award for the Middle Grade Literature category for Windswept in 2023.

== Works ==
- Windswept, Illustrator Armando Veve, Harry N. Abrams, 2022, ISBN 978-1419758249
- Storm's Coming!, Illustrator David Geister, MHS Press, 2016, ISBN 978-1-68134-0180-0
- The Bamboo Sword, Amulet Books, 2015, ISBN 978-1-4197-0807-7
- Enchantment Lake, University of Minnesota Press, 2015, ISBN 978-0-8166-8302-4
- West of the Moon, Amulet Books, 2014, ISBN 978-1-4197-1532-7
- Shadow on The Mountain, Aumlet Books, 2012, ISBN 978-1419711596
- The Legend of the Lady Slipper. Illustrator Andrea Arroyo. Houghton Mifflin Harcourt. 1999. ISBN 978-0-395-90512-8. "Margi Preus."
- A Book of Grace: Words to Bring You Peace. Sourcebooks, Inc. 2002. ISBN 978-1-57071-977-6.
- The Peace Bell, Illustrator Hideko Takahashi, Henry Holt, 2008, ISBN 978-0-8050-7800-8
- Heart of a Samurai, Amulet Books, 2010, ISBN 978-0-8109-8981-8
- Celebritrees: Historic and Famous Trees of the World. Illustrator Rebecca Gibbon. Macmillan. 2011. ISBN 978-0-8050-7829-9.
- The Shrew Detective, Amulet Books, 2026, ISBN 978-1-4197-7802-5, Illustrated by Junyi Wu.
