= Jane Bahk =

Canadian children book author

Jane Bahk is a children book author who is the writer of Juna's Jar.

== Personal life ==
She was born in Toronto, Canada. She is a former MMA straw weight champion. She is a former school teacher. Her parents immigrated from Korea.

== Awards ==
- Asian/Pacific American Award for Literature for Picture Book in 2015-2016
- New Voices Award in 2010

== Works ==
- Juna's Jar
- Juna and Appa
