= David Mas Masumoto =

Farmer and author

David "Mas" Masumoto is an organic peach and grape farmer and author of Epitaph for a Peach (1995), which offers a glimpse of life on a family farm in Central California, Letters to the Valley, A Harvest of Memories (2004), Four Seasons in Five Senses, Things Worth Savoring (2003), and Harvest Son, Planting Roots in American Soil (1998). His organic farming techniques have been employed by farmers across the nation.

Masumoto earned his B.A. in sociology from the University of California, Berkeley and an M.S. in community development 1982 from the University of California, Davis. He is the winner of the UC Davis “Award of Distinction” from the College of Agricultural and Environmental Sciences in 2003. He was a founding member of California Association of Family Farmers. He has served on the California Tree Fruit Agreement research board and has been a member of the Raisin Advisory Committee research board.

Masumoto and his wife have two children. They reside in a 90-year-old farmhouse surrounded by their vineyards and orchards just outside Del Rey, California which is 20 miles south of Fresno.
