= Andrew Fukuda =

American novelist

Andrew Fukuda is an American author, widely held in libraries worldwide. His highest held book in libraries, The Hunt, was reviewed by The Guardian in 2013.

Born in Manhattan, New York and moved to a British expatriate community in Hong Kong at a young age, his father was Japanese and his mother is Chinese.

== Personal life ==
Andrew Fukuda is a full-time writer. He currently resides in Long Island, New York with his family.

As a full-time writer, Fukuda wrote The Hunt Trilogy. The trilogy takes place in a dystopian world where vampire-like creatures reign supreme and humans (called hepers) are close to extinction.

== Publications ==
- Crossing (May 2010)
- This Light Between Us (January 2020)

=== The Hunt Trilogy ===
- "The Lightning Storm", prequel to The Hunt (2011)
- The Hunt (May 2012)
- The Prey (January 2013)
- The Trap (November 2013)

== Awards ==
Crossing received recognitions as a Top Ten First Novel, Top Ten First Crime Novel, and Editor's Choice from ALA Booklist.
