= Danbi Leads the School Parade =

2020 picture book by Anna Kim

- First edition cover
- Author: Anna Kim
- Publisher: Viking Press
- Publication date: July 7, 2020
- Pages: 40
- ISBN: 978-0-451-47889-4

Danbi Leads the School Parade is a children's book by Anna Kim, published in 2020 by Viking Press.

Danbi Leads the School Parade tells the story of a girl from Korea, Danbi, on her first day of school in the United States. Danbi is nervous and unsure at first because she does not understand the language or know any of the games the other children are playing, but she ends up leading her classmates on a parade after showing them how to use chopsticks during lunchtime.

Like the book's main character, Kim immigrated to the United States from South Korea as a little girl. She was inspired to write the book after looking for books for her nieces and finding none that represented the Korean immigrant experience.

Kim also wrote a sequel to Danbi Leads the School Parade called Danbi's Favorite Day. It follows Danbi as she and her new friends celebrate the Korean holiday of Children's Day. Kim's stories bring diverse characters into children's literature and provide readers with a likeable, realistic heroine.

== Plot summary ==
Danbi is a little girl who is nervous about her first day of school in America. All the other children stare at her as the teacher welcomes her into the classroom. The teacher hands her a marker, but she does not know what to do with it. She writes her name on the board in Korean, and she is proud of her handwriting. Then, she realizes that no one in the classroom can read it or know what it means.

After that, the teacher leads the students in some dances that Danbi does not know, so she struggles and falls down. The students then play games, but no one wants to play with Danbi because she does not understand the games and keeps messing up. She accidentally knocks down their block castle and destroys their game of pick-up sticks. She is feeling sad and lonely, but then lunchtime comes and Danbi is excited because she finally knows what to do. Her lunch contains all her favorite Korean foods. She tries to share with one of her classmates, but the girl does not know how to use the chopsticks Danbi offers her. So, Danbi shows everyone how to use chopsticks and soon they all want to try. Danbi is inspired by tapping her chopsticks on her lunchbox.

Soon, everyone else is making music with their lunches, too. They parade around the classroom and the playground, and Danbi begins to feel like she belongs.

At the end of the school day, she introduces herself to the girl she tried to share her food with. The girl's name is Nelly. Nelly shows her how to write Danbi in English, and together they put their names on their cubbies. That night as she is getting ready for bed, Danbi is excited to tell her mother that she made a friend. Before she goes to sleep, Danbi practices writing her name in English.

== Themes ==
=== Creativity and connection ===
The idea that creativity can help people connect, even across cultures, is one of the main themes of Danbi Leads the School Parade. When Danbi first enters her new classroom, she does not feel like she fits in. The other children do not want to play with her because she does not understand their games or even their language. She tries to interact with them, but she keeps making mistakes, falling during their dances and knocking over their blocks during playtime. However, during lunch, she pulls out chopsticks and finds a creative way to connect across cultures: a parade. Her classmates eagerly join in, using utensils and other items from their own lunches as noisemakers, inspired by the clacking of Danbi's chopsticks. This lunchtime parade is a "spark of imagination" on Danbi's part. She uses her creativity to connect to her new classmates. She cannot find a way to connect with them through their activities, so she makes up her own.

Through her creativity, Danbi forms a connection with her new classmates by finding something that they all have in common: a love of noise making and spontaneous celebration. In addition, her creativity leads to her forming her first American friendship with a girl named Nelly. Before the parade, Danbi offers Nelly a rainbow drop from her lunch. Nelly is confused and taken aback because she does not know what a rainbow drop is or how to use the chopsticks Danbi tries to hand her. However, at the end of the day, after Danbi's parade, they introduce themselves to each other and become fast friends. Nelly is able to see that Danbi is not so different from her after all, even though they come from different cultures.

=== Open-mindedness ===
Open-mindedness is a theme in Danbi Leads the School Parade. When Danbi starts at her new American school, the other children in her class do not immediately accept her. When she enters the room, they all just stare. Later, after she falls in their dances, does not understand their games, and destroys their block castle, they refuse to play with her. Danbi is hurt by their behavior because she is trying hard to make friends in her new home.

However, Danbi's day brightens when lunchtime arrives and her classmates are awed by her assortment of foods that are exotic to them, including crystal dumplings, rainbow drops, and rice cakes. The children's openness can serve as an inspiration to children reading the book who have classmates from different backgrounds, encouraging them "to adopt a similar posture." During lunchtime, Danbi's classmates begin to look at her with more of an open mind. After seeing her exotic foods, they are impressed by her culture. And after she shows them how to use chopsticks, they have a parade with Danbi at the front. By the end of the day, one little girl named Nelly, who was initially unsure about Danbi, becomes her friend, shows her how to write her name in English. She becomes more open-minded and is willing to help Danbi feel welcome in America while also accepting her heritage.
