= Green Frog (short story collection) =

2024 short story collection by Gina Chung

Green Frog: Stories
- Author: Gina Chung
- Genre: Literary fiction, speculative fiction, magical realism
- Publisher: Vintage
- Publication date: March 12, 2024
- Pages: 240
- ISBN: 978-0593469361
- Preceded by: Sea Change

Green Frog: Stories is a 2024 short story collection by Korean American writer Gina Chung. It features 15 short stories across various genres, from literary fiction to magical realism, many of which tackle matters such as womanhood and Korean American experience. It was chosen as a Buzz Pick by Good Morning America.

== Background ==
Many of the book's short stories concern animals, nature, and Korean folktales. The book's title, as well as short story by the name, refers to the legend of the green frog (Korean: 청 개구리; RR: Chong kaeguri), a tale involving a green frog whose disobedience to his mother leads to her early death. Chung told the Chicago Review of Books: "It’s a very traumatic story that I grew up with, and it’s common in Korean culture for wayward or disobedient children to be called chong kaeguri themselves." Chung chose to title the short story collection after the green frog per writer Vanessa Chan's recommendation.

Chung stated that she "didn't realize that I was writing all these things related to animals until trusted readers in my life, including friends and teachers from my MFA program, pointed it out." In addition to "Green Frog", "Rabbit Heart" involves rabbits which, according to Chung, are "often seen as these sort of trickster figures, as there are a lot of stories where the rabbit is in a sticky situation that it manages to get out of through its wiles because it’s very quick." Another animal story is "Mantis", which follows a female praying mantis whose exploits in love inevitably leads her to kill her male sexual partners.

The book's epigraph is quoted from Emily Jungmin Yoon's A Cruelty Special to Our Species.

== Critical reception ==
Kirkus Reviews called the book's stories "Lovely, emotionally resonant". Publishers Weekly wrote that "Chung’s talents are on full display in these contemplative tales." In a starred review, Booklist lauded Chung's "superb 15-story collection highlighting Korean and Korean American mothers and daughters navigating their lives both together and apart."

Many critics appreciated Chung's diversity of genres and modes through her short stories ranging from literary fiction to the speculative form. The Asian Review of Books observed that "Chung is both talented and deft. The stories are written alternatively in first-person singular, third-person, second-person and even first-person plural ... The protagonists range from children through women of a “certaine âge”. Some conclude in a matter of hours, others unroll over years if not decades ... Chung will on occasion dip into magic realism and speculative fiction". Regarding her usage of animals, The Soapberry Review stated: "Chung lays bare the difficulty in living whether you’re a frog or a praying mantis or a human, yet she unfolds hope like jewels with her use of language, metaphor, and imagery." MPR News said that the book was "Wildly entertaining, wonderfully diverse, and always delivered with a superb understanding of pacing and economy of language".

Other critics lauded Chung's writing of womanhood. The Los Angeles Review of Books called the book a "glimmering collection ... populated by mothers and daughters and sisters and lovers, by women who tear each other down yet are first to arrive if something goes wrong." Similarly, critics paid attention to her writing of Korean Americans. Nb. wrote that the book had "emotionally resonant stories that explore the complexities of human relationships, identity, culture, and the multifaceted nature of womanhood through the lens of the Korean American experience." The Southern Bookseller Review said the book "sparkles in its deft explorations of womanhood, identity, and family."

== Table of contents ==
Title	Original publication, if any	Notes
"How to Eat Your Own Heart"	Catapult	
"Green Frog"	Split Lip Magazine	Chosen for Longform Fiction Pick of the Week
"After the Party"	VIDA Review	
"Rabbit Heart"	Waxwing	
"Presence"	Electric Literature	
"Human Hearts"	Kenyon Review	Longlisted for the CRAFT Elements Contest
"Mantis"	Wigleaf	Won a Pushcart Prize and was reprinted in The Pushcart Prize XLVII: Best of the Small Presses 2023 Edition
"The Sound of Water"	Indiana Review	
"Attachment Processes"	Idaho Review	Distinguished story in The Best American Short Stories 2023, ed. Min Jin Lee
"The Arrow"	One Story	
"Names for Fireflies"	BOMB Magazine	
"Honey and Sun"	Gulf Coast	
"You'll Never Know How Much I Loved You"		
"The Fruits of Sin"	Pleiades	
"The Love Song of the Mexican Free-Tailed Bat"	F(r)iction	
