= Cybils Award =

Literary award

Cybils Awards
- Awarded for: Literary merit and kid appeal in children's and young adult literature
- Presented by: Bloggers with expertise in children's literature
- First award: 2006
- Website: cybils.com

The Cybils Awards, or Children's and Young Adult Bloggers' Literary Awards, are a set of annual book awards given by people who blog about children's and young adult books. Co-founded by Kelly Herold and Anne Boles Levy in 2006, the awards were created to address an apparent gap between children's book awards perceived as too elitist and other awards that did not seem selective enough.

Books are nominated by the public in ten genres of children's and young adult literature: Book Apps, Easy Readers & Short Chapter Books, Fantasy & Science fiction, Fiction Picture books, Graphic novels, Middle Grade Novels, Non-fiction Middle Grade/Young Adult Books, Non-Fiction Picture Books, poetry, and Young Adult Novels. Nominees go through two rounds of panel-based judging before a winner is announced in each category. Finalists and winners are selected on the basis of literary merit and kid appeal.

Panelists are volunteers and must be active bloggers with extensive experience in children's or young adult literature, either as readers and enthusiasts or as authors, librarians, booksellers, teachers, or others with verifiable investment in the world of children's literature.

== Criteria ==
- Anybody may nominate a children's or young adult book published October 16 of the preceding year – October 15 of the contest year.
- Books must be written in English or they may be bilingual.
- Only one book may be nominated per person, per category.
- Nominations open October 1 and close October 15 of the contest year.
- Books should exemplify award criteria of literary merit and "kid appeal".

== Recipients ==
=== Audiobooks (2016) ===
Year	Author(s)	Narrator(s)	Title	Result	Ref.
2016	Adam Gidwitz	Vikas Adam, Mark Bramhall, Jonathan Cowley, Kimberly Farr, Adam Gidwitz, Ann Marie Lee, Bruce Mann, John H. Mayer, and Arthur Morey	The Inquisitor's Tale: Or, the Three Magical Children and Their Holy Dog	Winner	
2016	John Claude Bemis	Ralph Lister	The Wooden Prince	Finalist	
2016	Kate DiCamillo	Jenna Lamia	Raymie Nightingale	Finalist	
2016	Grace Lin	Kim Mai Guest	When the Sea Turned to Silver	Finalist	
2016	Richard Peck	Michael Crouch	The Best Man	Finalist	

=== Board books (2016–) ===
Year	Author(s)	Title	Result	Ref.
2016	Christopher Franceschelli, illus. by Peskimo	Cityblock	Winner	
2016	Patty Rodriguez and Ariana Stein, illus. by Citlali Reyes	Cuauhtemoc: Shapes/Formas	Finalist	
2016	Sandra Boynton	Dinosaur Dance!	Finalist	
2016	Emily Sper	Follow the Yarn: A Book of Colors	Finalist	
2016	Agnese Baruzzi	Look, Look Again	Finalist	
2017	Nathan Thoms, illus. by Carles Ballesteros	Changing Faces: Meet Happy Bear	Winner	
2017	Douglas Florian, illus. by Barbara Bakos	Bears Are Big	Finalist	
2017	Kenji Oikawa and Mayuko Takeuc	Circle, Triangle, Elephant: A Book of Shapes and Surprises	Finalist	
2017	Leslie Patricelli	Hair	Finalist	
2017	Catherine Rayner	One Happy Tiger	Finalist	
2017	Nina Laden	Peek-a-Moo!	Finalist	
2017	Susanna Leonard Hill, illus. by Daniel Wiseman	When Your Lion Needs a Bath	Finalist	
2018	Janik Coat	Llamaphones	Winner	
2018	Steve Light	Black Bird Yellow Sun	Finalist	
2018	David W. Miles	But First, We Nap: A Little Book About Nap Time	Finalist	
2018	Elsa Mroziewicz	Peek-a-Who	Finalist	
2018	Jason Fulford and Tamara Shopsin	These Colors Are Bananas	Finalist	
2018	Jean Jullien	Why the Face?	Finalist	
2018	Jacques Duquennoy	Zoe and Zack: Shapes	Finalist	
2019	Tatsuhide Matsuoka, trans. by Cathy Hirano	Jump!	Winner	
2019	Joyce Wan	Dream Big	Finalist	
2019	Aleksandra Szmidt	Good Night, World	Finalist	
2019	Della Ross Ferreri, illus. by Mette Engel	Huggle Wuggle, Bedtime Snuggle	Finalist	
2019	Ryan T. Higgins	Peek-a-Bruce	Finalist	
2019	Elsa Mroziewicz	Peek-a-Who Too?	Finalist	
2019	Aaron Becker	You Are Light	Finalist	
2020	No award was presented in 2020			
2021	Marine Schneider	Big Bear, Little Bear	Winner	
2021	Cushman Abi	Animals Go Vroom!	Finalist	
2021	Toni Buzzeo, illus. by Chi Birmingham	Caution! Road Signs Ahead	Finalist	
2021	Carter Higgins	Circle Under Berry	Finalist	
2021	Janik Coat	Comparrotives	Finalist	
2021	Jean Jullien	This Is Still Not a Book	Finalist	
2021	Ben Newman	Turn Seek Find: Habitats	Finalist	
2022	Giuliano Ferri	Look Twice	Winner	
2022	Annie Bailey	10 Little Tractors (10 Little Vehicles)	Finalist	
2022	Jane Whittingham	Animals Move (Big, Little Concepts, 3)	Finalist	
2022	Suzy Ultman	Be My Neighbor?	Finalist	
2022	LaTonya Yvette	The Hair Book	Finalist	
2022	Jill McDonald	Hello, World! Garden Time	Finalist	
2022	Laura Gehl	Odd Birds: Meet Nature's Weirdest Flock	Finalist	
2023	Annie Bailey	Whose Prints? Kari Allen, illustrated by Kim Smith	Winner	
2023	Katrina Tangen, illustrated by Giulia Orecchia	Copy That, Copy Cat!: Inventions Inspired by Animals	Finalist	
2023	Greg Pizzoli	Mister Kitty Is Lost!	Finalist	
2023	Beatriz Giménez de Ory and Paloma Valdivia	Sneak!	Finalist	
2023	Lydia Nichols	Some Dogs	Finalist	
2023	Carter Higgins	Some of These Are Snails	Finalist	
2023	Natasha Wing, illustrated by Grace Habib	Squeak-a-boo!	Finalist	
2024	Laura Gehl, illustrated by Loris Lora	Who Laid These Eggs?	Winner	
2024	Chambrae Griffith, illustrated by Taia Morley	Barn in Spring: Out to Explore on the Farm - A Beautiful Story of Togetherness, Adventure and Love	Finalist	
2024	Phyllis Limbacher Tildes	Eye Guess: A Forest Animal Guessing Game	Finalist	
2024	Sophie Aggett, illustrated by Anna Terreros-Martin	Group Hug!	Finalist	
2024	Sophie Aggett, illustrated by Malgorzata Detner	My Busy Noisy Day	Finalist	
2024	Sue Lowell Gallion, art by Lisk Feng	Our Galaxy: A First Adventure in Space	Finalist	
2024	Lourdes Heuer, illustrated by Zara González Hoang	Teeny Tiendas: The Fruit Shop/La frutería	Finalist	

=== Book apps (2011–2015) ===
Year	App	Developer	Result	Ref.
2011	The Monster at the End of This Book	Callaway Digital Arts, Inc	Winner	
2011	Be Confident in Who You Are: A Middle School Confidential Graphic Novel by Annie Fox	Electric Eggplant	Finalist	
2011	Bobo Explores Light	GameCollage	Finalist	
2011	Harold and the Purple Crayon by Crockett Johnson	Trilogy Studios	Finalist	
2011	Hildegard Sings by Thomas Wharton		Finalist	
2011	Pat the Bunny by Dorothy Kunhardt		Finalist	
2011	The Fantastic Flying Books of Mr. Morris Lessmore	Moonbot Studios	Finalist	
2012	Dragon Brush	Small Planet Digital	Winner	
2012	Bats! Furry Fliers of the Night	Bookerella	Finalist	
2012	Rounds: Franklin Frog	Nosy Crow	Finalist	
2012	The Voyage of Ulysses		Finalist	
2012	Where Do Balloons Go? An Uplifting Mystery by Jamie Lee Curtis, illustrated by Laura Cornell		Finalist	
2013	Disney Animated	Disney	Winner	
2013	Endless Alphabet	Originator Inc.	Finalist	
2013	MirrorWorld by Cornelia Funke	Mirada	Finalist	
2013	To This Day by Shane Koyczan		Finalist	
2013	Wee You-Things	Wee Society LLC	Finalist	
2014	Kalley's Machine Plus Cats	RocketWagon	Winner	
2014	Angus the Irritable Bull	Watermark Ltd	Finalist	
2014	Fiona & the Fog	William Poor	Finalist	
2014	Hat Monkey	Fox and Sheep GmbH	Finalist	
2014	How I Became a Pirate	Melinda Long	Finalist	
2014	Incredible Numbers by Professor Ian Stewart	Touchpress	Finalist	
2014	Rules of Summer	Shaun Tan	Finalist	
2015	Professor Astro Cat's Solar System	Minilab Ltd	Winner	
2015	David Wiesner's Spot	Houghton Mifflin Harcourt	Finalist	
2015	Earth Primer	Chaim Gingold	Finalist	
2015	Hilda Bewildered	Slap Happy Larry	Finalist	
2015	Metamorphabet	Vectorpark.com	Finalist	
2015	Wuwu & Co.	Step in Books	Finalist	

=== Early chapter books (2009–2023) ===
Year	Author	Illustrator	Title	Result	Ref.
2009	Lucy Nolan	Mike Reed	Winnener		
2009	Tim Kennemore	Mike Spoor	Alice's Shooting Star	Finalist	
2009	Claudia Mills	Heather Maione	How Oliver Olson Changed the World	Finalist	
2009	Kate DiCamillo	Chris Van Dusen	Mercy Watson: Something Wonky This Way Comes	Finalist	
2009	Katherine Applegate	Brian Biggs	Roscoe Riley Rules #7: Never Race a Runaway Pumpkin	Finalist	
2010	Jacqueline Jules	Miguel Benitez	Zapato Power: Freddie Ramos Takes Off	Winner	
2010	Atinuke		Anna Hibiscus	Finalist	
2010	Eric Wight		Frankie Pickle and the Pine Run 3000	Finalist	
2010	Lucy Nolan	Mike Ree	Home on the Range	Finalist	
2010	Stephanie Greene	Stephanie Sisson	Princess Posey and the First Grade Parade	Finalist	
2011	Atinuke		Have Fun, Anna Hibiscus!	Winner	
2011	Sara Pennypacker	Marla Frazee	Clementine and the Family Meeting	Finalist	
2011	Charise Mericle Harper		Just Grace and the Double Surprise	Finalist	
2011	Julie Sternberg	Matthew Cordell	Like Pickle Juice on a Cookie	Finalist	
2011	Doreen Cronin	Kevin Cornell	The Trouble with Chickens	Finalist	
2012	Sonya Hartnett	Ann James	Sadie and Ratz	Winner	
2012	Annie Barrows	Sophie Blackall	Ivy and Bean Make the Rules	Finalist	
2012	Kate Messner	Brian Floca	Marty McGuire Digs Worms!	Finalist	
2012	Cece Bell		Rabbit and Robot: The Sleepover	Finalist	
2012	Anna Branford, illus. by	Elanna Allen	Violet Mackerel's Brilliant Plot	Finalist	
2013	James Preller, illus. by	Iacopo Bruno	Home Sweet Horror	Winner	
2013	Ursula Vernon		The Case of the Toxic Mutants	Finalist	
2013	Claudia Mills	Rob Shepperson	Kelsey Green, Reading Queen	Finalist	
2013	Lauren Myracle	Jed Henry	The Life of Ty: Penguin Problems	Finalist	
2013	Hilary McKay		Lulu and the Dog from the Sea	Finalist	
2013	Anna Branford	Elanna Allen	Violet Mackerel's Natural Habitat	Finalist	
2014	Judith Viorst	Kevin Cornell	Lulu's Mysterious Mission	Winner	
2014	Doreen Cronin	Kevin Cornell	The Chicken Squad: The First Misadventure	Finalist	
2014	Abby Hanlon		Dory Fantasmagory	Finalist	
2014	Julie Sternberg	Matthew Cordell	Like Carrot Juice on a Cupcake	Finalist	
2014	Nicola Davies	Annabel Wright	The Lion Who Stole My Arm	Finalist	
2014	Hilary McKay		Lulu and the Rabbit Next Door	Finalist	
2014	Anna Branford	Elanna Allen	Violet Mackerel's Possible Friend	Finalist	
2015	Abby Hanlon		Dory and the Real True Friend	Winner	
2015	Bruce Hale		Big Bad Detective Agency	Finalist	
2015	Kate Messner	Kelley McMorris	Rescue on the Oregon Trail	Finalist	
2015	Hilary McKay		Lulu and the Hamster in the Night	Finalist	
2015	Yasmine Surovec		My Pet Human	Finalist	
2015	Kallie George	Alexandra Boiger	Clover's Luck	Finalist	
2015	Liam O'Donnell	Aurélie Grand	West Meadows Detectives: The Case of the Snack Snatcher	Finalist	
2016	Polly Faber	Clara Vulliamy	Mango & Bambang: The Not-a-Pig	Winner	
2016	Abby Hanlon		Dory Dory Black Sheep	Finalist	
2016	Juana Medina		Juana and Lucas	Finalist	
2016	Shannon Hale and Dean Hale	LeUyen Pham	The Princess in Black and the Hungry Bunny Horde	Finalist	
2016	Linda Urban	Katie Kath	Weekends with Max and His Dad	Finalist	
2016	Kate DiCamillo	Chris Van Dusen	Where Are You Going, Baby Lincoln?	Finalist	
2017	Suzanne Selfors	Barbara Fisinger	Wedgie & Gizmo	Winner	
2017	Patricia MacLachlan	Marc Boutavant	Barkus	Finalist	
2017	Asia Citro	Marion Lindsay	Dragons and Marshmallows	Finalist	
2017	Kallie George	Stephanie Graegin	The Greatest Gift	Finalist	
2017	Jacqueline Jules	Kim Smith	My Fantástica Family	Finalist	
2017	Terry Lynn Johnson	Jani Orban	Overboard!	Finalist	
2017	Laura Amy Schlitz	Brian Floca	Princess Cora and the Crocodile	Finalist	
2017	Shannon Hale and Dean Hale	LeUyen Pham	The Princess in Black Takes a Vacation	Finalist	
2018	Debbi Michiko Florence	Elizabet Vukovic	Jasmine Toguchi, Drummer Girl	Winner	
2018	Ellen Potter	Felicita Sala	Big Foot and Little Foot	Finalist	
2018	Asia Citro	Marion Lindsay	Caterflies and Ice	Finalist	
2018	Anna Humphrey	Kass Reich	Megabat	Finalist	
2018	H. M. Bouwman	Charlie Alder	Owen and Eleanor Move In	Finalist	
2018	Alice Kuipers	Diana Toledano	Polly Diamond and the Magic Book	Finalist	
2019	Megan Frazer Blakemore	Nadja Sarell	Frankie Sparks and the Class Pet	Winner	
2019	Rachel Vail		A Is for Elizabeth	Finalist	
2019	Chitra Soundar	Uma Krishnaswamy	Mangoes, Mischief, and Tales of Friendship: Stories from India	Finalist	
2019	Alex T. Smith		Mr. Penguin and the Lost Treasure	Finalist	
2019	Julian Gough		Rabbit & Bear: Rabbit's Bad Habits	Finalist	
2020	Lauren Castillo		Our Friend Hedgehog: The Story of Us	Winner	
2020	Lyla Lee	Dung Ho	Mindy Kim and the Yummy Seaweed Business	Finalist	
2020	Hannah Barnaby	Anoosha Syed	Monster and Boy	Finalist	
2020	Andrea Beaty	David Roberts	Sofia Valdez and the Vanishing Vote	Finalist	
2020	Kate DiCamillo	Chris Van Dusen	Stella Endicott and the Anything-Is-Possible Poem	Finalist	
2021	Jacqueline Davies	Deborah Hocking	Sydney and Taylor Explore the Whole Wide World	Winner	
2021	Gary D. Schmidt and Elizabeth Stickney	Eugene Yelchin	A Long Road on a Short Day	Finalist	
2021	Carter Higgins	Jennifer K. Mann	Audrey L and Audrey W: Best Friends-ish	Finalist	
2021	Atinuke	Onyinye Iwu	Too Small Tola	Finalist	
2021	Saadia Faruqi		Yasmin the Scientist	Finalist	
2022	Kallie George	Birgitta Sif	Crimson Twill: Witch in the City	Winner	
2022	Cynthia Lord	Stephanie Graegin	Marco Polo Brave Explorer	Finalist	
2022	Martha Brockenbrough	Jon Lau	Frank and the Bad Surprise	Finalist	
2022	Dawn Quigley	Tara Audibert	Jo Jo Makoons: Fancy Pants	Finalist	
2022	Matt Phelan	Matt Phelan	Leave It to Plum!	Finalist	
2022	A. I. Newton	Anjan Sarkar	Artemis, the Archer Goddess	Finalist	
2022	Mark David Smith	Kari Rust	The Weird Sisters: A Note, a Goat, and a Casserole	Finalist	
2023	Jenn Bailey	Mika Song	Henry, Like Always	Winner	
2023	Keka Novales	Carolina Vázquez	Lola's First Day of the Dead (¡Hola, Lola!)	Finalist	
2023	Kari Allen	Tatjana Mai-Wyss	Maddie and Mabel Know They Can	Finalist	
2023	Jessica Lee Anderson	Alejandra Barajas	Saving Snakes	Finalist	
2023	Hanna Kim	Emily Paik	The Magic Lunch Box	Finalist	
2023	Shannon and Dean Hale	LeUyen Pham	The Princess in Black and the Prince in Pink	Finalist	
2023	Atinuke	Onyinye Iwu	Too Small Tola Gets Tough	Finalist	

=== Easy readers (2008–2023) ===
Year	Author	Illustrator	Title	Result	Ref.
2008	Mo Willems		I Love My New Toy	Winner	
2008	James Howe	Marie-Louise Gay	Houndsley and Catina and the Quiet Time	Finalists	
2008	Mo Willems		I Will Surprise My Friend!	Finalists	
2008	Katie Speck	Paul Rátz de Tagyos	Maybelle Goes to Tea	Finalists	
2008	Kate Dicamillo	Chris Van Dusen	Mercy Watson Thinks Like a Pig	Finalists	
2009	Mo Willems		Watch Me Throw the Ball!	Winner	
2009	David Catrow		Max Spaniel: Dinosaur Hunt	Finalists	
2009	Lori Ries	Frank W. Dormer	Good Dog, Aggie	Finalists	
2009	Cynthia Rylant	Arthur Howard	Mr. Putter & Tabby Spill the Beans	Finalists	
2009	Joan Holub	Tim Bowers	Shampoodle	Finalists	
2010	Mo Willems		We Are in a Book!	Winner	
2010	Erica Silverman	Betsy Lewin	Cowgirl Kate and Cocoa: Spring Babies	Finalists	
2010	Tedd Arnold		Fly Guy Meets Fly Girl	Finalists	
2010	Melissa Stewart		National Geographic Readers: Ants	Finalists	
2010	Dori Chaconas	Lisa McCue	Cork and Fuzz: The Babysitters	Finalists	
2011	Mo Willems		I Broke My Trunk!	Winner	
2011	Lori Ries	Frank W. Dormer	Aggie Gets Lost	Finalist	
2011	Tim Egan		Dodsworth in Rome	Finalist	
2011	Eve Bunting	Josée Masse	Frog and Friends	Finalist	
2012	Frank Viva		A Trip to the Bottom of the World with Mouse	Winner	
2012	Kate DiCamillo and Alison McGhee	Tony Fucile	Bink and Gollie: Two for One	Finalist	
2012	Kevin Henkes		Penny and Her Doll	Finalist	
2012	Kevin Henkes		Penny and Her Song	Finalist	
2012	Michael J. Daley	Thomas F. Yezerski	Pinch and Dash Make Soup	Finalist	
2013	Dosh Archer		Urgency Emergency! Big Bad Wolf	Winner	
2013	Mo Willems		A Big Guy Took My Ball!	Finalist	
2013	Jamie Michalak	Frank Remkiewicz	Joe and Sparky Go to School	Finalist	
2013	Jonathan Fenske		Love Is in the Air	Finalist	
2013	Kevin Henkes		Penny and Her Marble	Finalist	
2013	Josh Schneider		The Meanest Birthday Girl	Finalist	
2014	Maxwell Eaton III		Okay, Andy!	Winner	
2014	Ethan Long		Clara and Clem Under the Sea	Finalist	
2014	Sarah Dillard		Extraordinary Warren: A Super Chicken	Finalist	
2014	Melissa Wiley	Ag Jatkowska	Inch and Roly and the Sunny Day Scare	Finalist	
2014	Mo Willems		My New Friend Is So Fun!	Finalist	
2014	Alex Milway		Pigsticks and Harold and the Incredible Journey	Finalist	
2014	Jennifer E. Morris		The Ice Cream Shop	Finalist	
2015	Grace Lin		Ling & Ting: Twice as Silly	Winner	
2015	Jonathan Fenske		A Pig, a Fox, and a Box	Finalist	
2015	David A. Adler	Sam Ricks	Don't Throw It to Mo!	Finalist	
2015	Ethan Long		In, Over and On the Farm	Finalist	
2015	Kitson Jazynka		Rosa Parks	Finalist	
2015	Shelby Alinsky		Slither, Snake!	Finalist	
2015	Jacqueline Jules	Kim Smith	Picture Perfect	Finalist	
2016	Tina Kugler		Snail and Worm: Three Stories About Two Friends	Winner	
2016	Mo Willems		The Cookie Fiasco	Finalist	
2016	Elise Gravel		The Great Antonio	Finalist	
2016	Kara LaReau	Matt Myers	The Infamous Ratsos	Finalist	
2016	Cece Bell		Rabbit and Robot and Ribbit	Finalist	
2016	Laurie Keller		We Are Growing!	Finalist	
2017	Dori Hillestad Butler	Nancy Meyers	King & Kayla and the Case of the Secret Code	Winner	
2017	Laurel Snyder	Emily Hughes	Charlie & Mouse & Grumpy	Finalist	
2017	Shelley Rotner		I Like the Farm	Finalist	
2017	Salina Yoon		My Kite is Stuck! and Other Stories	Finalist	
2017	Jan Thomas		There's a Pest in the Garden!	Finalist	
2017	Candice Ransom	Monique Dong	Tooth Fairy's Night	Finalist	
2017	Jonathan Fenske		We Need More Nuts!	Finalist	
2017	Jan Thomas		What Is Chasing Duck?	Finalist	
2018	Corey R. Tabor		Fox the Tiger	Winner	
2018	Laura Driscoll	Catalina Echeverri	I Want to Be a Doctor	Finalist	
2018	J. E. Morris		Much Too Much Birthday	Finalist	
2018	Jan Thomas		My Toothbrush Is Missing	Finalist	
2018	Paula Yoo	Shirley Ng-Benitez	The Perfect Gift	Finalist	
2019	Saadia Faruqi	Hatem Aly	Yasmin the Superhero	Winner	
2019	Sergio Ruzzier		Fox & Chick: The Quiet Boat Ride and Other Stories	Finalist	
2019	Jamie Michalak	Bob Kolar	Frank and Bean	Finalist	
2019	Jonathan Fenske		Hello, Crabby!: An Acorn Book	Finalist	
2020	David LaRochelle	Mike Wohnoutka	See the Cat: Three Stories About a Dog	Winner	
2020	Laura Gehl	Fred Blunt	Cat Has a Plan	Finalist	
2020	Dori Hillestad Butler	Nancy Meyers	King & Kayla and the Case of the Unhappy Neighbor	Finalist	
2020	Katharine Kenah	Abby Carter	The Best Seat in First Grade	Finalist	
2020	Kelly Starling Lyons	Nina Mata	Ty's Travels: All Aboard!	Finalist	
2020	Ryan T. Higgins	Mo Willems	What About Worms!?	Finalist	
2020	Saadia Faruqi	Hatem Aly	Yasmin the Gardener	Finalist	
2021	David LaRochelle	Mike Wohnoutka	See the Dog: Three Stories About a Cat	Winner	
2021	Sam Wedelich		Chicken Little and the Big Bad Wolf	Finalist	
2021	Corey R. Tabor		Fox at Night	Finalist	
2021	Maggie P. Chang		Geraldine Pu and Her Lunch Box, Too!	Finalist	
2021	Meika Hashimoto	Gillian Reid	Kitty and Dragon	Finalist	
2021	Saadia Faruqi	Hatem Aly	Yasmin the Librarian	Finalist	
2022	Emma Otheguy	Andrés Landazábal	Reina Ramos Works It Out	Winner	
2022	Matthew Cordell		Cornbread & Poppy	Finalist	
2022	Melissa Iwai	Melissa Iwai	Gigi and Ojiji	Finalist	
2022	Steph Waldo	Steph Waldo	Tiny Tales: A Feast for Friends	Finalist	
2022	Kelly Starling Lyons	Niña Mata	Ty's Travels: Lab Magic	Finalist	
2022	Ryan T. Higgins	Ryan T. Higgins	World of Reading: Mother Bruce Ballet Bruce	Finalist	
2023	Kaz Windness	Kaz Windness	Worm and Caterpillar Are Friends	Winner	
2023	Jarvis	Jarvis	Bear and Bird: The Picnic and Other Stories	Finalist	
2023	Megan Litwin	Shauna Lynn Panczyszyn	Bug Catchers	Finalist	
2023	Katherine Applegate	Charlie Alder	Doggo and Pupper Search for Cozy	Finalist	
2023	Kate Messner	Heather Ross	Fergus and Zeke for President	Finalist	
2023	Jarrett Lerner	Jarrett Lerner	Nat the Cat Takes a Nap	Finalist	
2023	Kimberly Derting	Joelle Murray	Vivi Loves Science: Wind and Water	Finalist	

=== Speculative fiction (2006–) ===
==== General science fiction and fantasy (2006) ====
Year	Author	Title	Ref.
2006	Jonathan Stroud	Ptolemy's Gate	

==== Elementary and middle grade (2007–) ====
Year	Author	Title	Ref.
2007	Adam Rex	The True Meaning of Smekday	
2008	Neil Gaiman, illus. by Dave McKean	The Graveyard Book	
2009	Laini Taylor	Silksinger	
2010	Jacqueline West	The Shadows (Books of Elsewhere, Vol. 1),	
2011	Carmen Agra Deedy and Randall Wright, illustrated by Barry Moser	The Cheshire Cheese Cat: A Dickens of a Tale	
2012	Jennifer A. Nielsen	The False Prince	
2013	Jonathan Stroud	The Screaming Staircase	
2014	Paul Durham	The Luck Uglies	
2015	Joel Ross	The Fog Diver	
2016	Joshua Khan	Shadow Magic	
2017	Stephanie Burgis	The Dragon with a Chocolate Heart	
2018	Jessica Townsend	Nevermoor: The Trials of Morrigan Crow	
2019	Kwame Mbalia	Tristan Strong Punches a Hole in the Sky	
2020	Deva Fagan	Rival Magic	
2021	Kaela Rivera	Cece Rios and the Desert of Souls	
2022	Deva Fagan	The Mirrorwood	
2023	Heather Fawcett	The Grace of Wild Things	
2024	Katherine Rundell, illustrated by Ashley Mackenzie	Impossible Creatures	

==== Young adult (2007–) ====
Year	Author	Title	Ref.
2007	Shannon Hale	Book of a Thousand Days	
2008	Suzanne Collins	The Hunger Games	
2009	Kristin Cashore	Fire	
2010	Jonathan Maberry	Rot & Ruin	
2011	Moira Young	Blood Red Road	
2012	Rachel Hartman	Seraphina	
2013	Alaya Dawn Johnson	The Summer Prince	
2014	Matt de la Peña	The Living	
2015	Nova Ren Suma	The Walls Around Us	
2016	Amie Kaufman	Illuminae	
2017	Neal Shusterman	Scythe	
2018	Rachel Hartman	Tess of the Road	
2019	Rosaria Munda	Fireborne	
2020	Aiden Thomas	Cemetery Boys	
2021	Margaret Rogerson	Vespertine	
2022	Rebecca Podos	From Dust, a Flame	
2023	Kika Hatzopoulou	Threads That Bind	

=== Fiction ===
==== Picture book (2006–) ====
Year	Author(s)	Title	Ref.
2006	Mélanie Watt	Scaredy Squirrel	
2007	Janice N. Harrington, illus. by Shelley Jackson	The Chicken-Chasing Queen of Lamar County	
2008	Bob Graham	How to Heal a Broken Wing	
2009	Liz Garton Scanlon, illus. by Marla Frazee	All the World	
2010	David Ezra Stein	Interrupting Chicken	
2011	Patrick McDonnell	Me ... Jane	
2012	Philip C. Stead	A Home for Bird	
2013	Peter Brown	Mr. Tiger Goes Wild	
2014	Chris Haughton	Shh! We Have a Plan	
2015	JonArno Lawson, illus. by Sydney Smith	Sidewalk Flowers	
2016	Lucy Ruth Cummins	A Hungry Lion, or A Dwindling Assortment of Animals	
2017	Elisha Cooper	Big Cat, Little Cat	
2018	Ryan T. Higgins	We Don't Eat Our Classmates	
2019	Kate Read	One Fox: A Counting Book Thriller	
2020	Derrick Barnes, illus. by Gordon C. James	I Am Every Good Thing	
2021	Andrea Wang, illus. by Jason Chin	Watercress	
2022	Christopher Denise	Knight Owl	
2023	Vashti Harrison	Big	

==== Middle grade (2006–) ====
Year	Author	Title	Ref.
2006	Laura Amy Schlitz	A Drowned Maiden's Hair: A Melodrama	
2007	Linda Urban	A Crooked Kind of Perfect	
2008	Siobhan Dowd	The London Eye Mystery	
2009	Laurie Halse Anderson	Chains	
2010	Tom Angleberger	The Strange Case of Origami Yoda	
2011	Elissa Brent Weissman	Nerd Camp	
2012	R. J. Palacio	Wonder	
2013	David Carroll	Ultra	
2014	Dean Pitchford	Nickel Bay Nick	
2015	Kevin Sands	The Blackthorn Key	
2016	Jason Reynolds	Ghost	
2017	Alan Gratz	Refugee	
2018	Varian Johnson	The Parker Inheritance	
2019	Dan Gemeinhart	The Remarkable Journey of Coyote Sunrise	
2020	Janae Marks	From the Desk of Zoe Washington	
2021	Gordon Korman	Linked	
2022	Amina Luqman-Dawson	Freewater	
2023	Erin Bow	Simon Sort of Says	

==== Young adult (2006–) ====
Year	Author	Title	Ref.
2006	Rachel Cohn and David Levithan	Nick and Norah's Infinite Playlist	
2007	Barry Lyga	Boy Toy	
2008	E. Lockhart	The Disreputable History of Frankie Landau-Banks	
2009	Courtney Summers	Cracked Up To Be	
2010	Swati Avasthi	Split	
2011	Geoff Herbach	Stupid Fast	
2012	Jesse Andrews	Me and Earl and the Dying Girl	
2013	Meg Medina	Yaqui Delgado Wants to Kick Your Ass	
2014	Brandy Colbert	Pointe	
2015	Tamara Ireland Stone	Every Last Word	
2016	Ruta Sepetys	Salt to the Sea	
2017	Renée Watson	Piecing Me Together	
2018	Courtney Summers	Sadie	
2019	Mindy McGinnis	Heroine	
2020	Yamile Saied Méndez	Furia	
2021	Tess Sharpe	The Girls I've Been	
2022	Jen Ferguson	The Summer of Bitter and Sweet	
2023	Jas Hammonds	We Deserve Monuments	
2024	Randy Ribay	Everything We Never Had	

=== Graphic novel ===
==== Elementary and middle grade (2006–) ====
Year	Contributors	Title	Ref.
2006	Jimmy Gownley	Amelia Rules! Vol. 3: Superheroes	
2007	Eoin Colfer and Andrew Donkin, illus. by Giovanni Rigano and Paolo Lamanna	Artemis Fowl: The Graphic Novel	
2008	Shannon Hale and Dean Hale, illus. by Nathan Hale	Rapunzel's Revenge	
2009	Eleanor Davis	The Secret Science Alliance and the Copycat Crook	
2010	Jason Shiga	Meanwhile: Pick Any Path. 3856 Story Possibilities	
2011	Ben Hatke	Zita the Spacegirl	
2012	Jorge Aguirre, illus. by Rafael Rosado with John Novak and Matthew Schenk	Giants Beware!	
2013	Barry Deutsch	Hereville: How Mirka Met a Meteorite	
2014	Cece Bell, colored by David Lasky	El Deafo	
2015	Victoria Jamieson	Roller Girl	
2016	Cathy Camper, illus. by Raúl the Third	Lowriders to the Center of the Earth	
2017	Julie Kim	Where's Halmoni?	
2018	Lee Knox Ostertag	The Witch Boy	
2019	Jerry Craft	New Kid	
2020	Victoria Jamieson and Omar Mohamed, illus. by Victoria Jamieson and	When Stars Are Scattered	
2021	Lily LaMotte, illus. by Ann Xu	Measuring Up	
2022	Christina Diaz Gonzalez, illus. by Gabriela Epstein	Invisible	
2023	Dan Santat	A First Time for Everything	
2024	Sherri L. Smith, illustrated by Christine Norrie	Pearl	

==== Young adult (2006–) ====
Year	Contributor(s)	Title	Ref.
2006	Gene Luen Yang	American Born Chinese	
2007	Joann Sfar, illus. by Emmanuel Guibert	The Professor's Daughter	
2008	Mariko Tamaki, illus. by Steve Rolston	Emiko Superstar	
2009	Tom Siddell	Gunnerkrigg Court: Orientation	
2010	G. Neri, illus. by Randy DuBurke	Yummy: the Last Days of a Southside Shorty	
2011	Vera Brosgol	Anya's Ghost	
2012	Faith Erin Hicks	Friends With Boys	
2013	Jordan Mechner, illus. by LeUyen Pham and Alex Puvilland	Templar	
2014	Cory Doctorow, illus. by Jen Wang	In Real Life	
2015	ND Stevenson	Nimona	
2016	John Lewis with Andrew Aydin, illus. by Nate Powell	March: Book Three	
2017	Scott Westerfeld, illus. by Alex Puvilland	Spill Zone	
2018	Jarrett J. Krosoczka	Hey, Kiddo	
2019	David A. Robertson, Jen Storm, Katherena Vermette, Niigaanwewidam James Sinclair, Rachel Qitsualik-Tinsley, Richard Van Camp, Sean Qitsualik-Tinsley, and Sonny Assu	This Place: 150 Years Retold	
2020	Gene Luen Yang, illus. by Gurihiru	Superman Smashes the Klan	
2021	Crystal Frasier, illus. by Val Wise and Oscar O. Jupiter (letterer)	Cheer Up: Love and Pompoms	
2022	Laura Gao	Messy Roots: A Graphic Memoir of a Wuhanese American	
2023	Deb JJ Lee	In Limbo	
2024	Samuel Teer, illustrated by Julia Mar	Brownstone	

=== Nonfiction ===
==== Picture books (2006–2012) ====
Year	Author(s)	Title	Ref.
2006	Dianna Aston, illus. by Sylvia Long	An Egg is Quiet	
2007	Brian Floca	Lightship	
2008	Nic Bishop	Frogs	
2009	Chris Barton, illus. by Tony Persiani	The Day-Glo Brothers	
2010	Barbara Kerley, illus. by Edwin Fotheringham	The Extraordinary Life of Mark Twain (According to Susy)	
2011	Carlyn Beccia	I Feel Better with a Frog in My Throat: History's Strangest Cures	
2012	Alicia Potter, illus. by Melissa Sweet	Mrs Harkness and the Panda	

==== Juvenile (2016) ====
Year	Author	Title	Result	Ref.
2016	Melissa Sweet	Some Writer!: The Story of E. B. White	Winner	
2016	Charles Ghigna and Animal Planet	Animal Planet Strange, Unusual, Gross & Cool Animals	Finalists	
2016	Lois Miner Huey	Floodwaters and Flames: The 1913 Disaster in Dayton, Ohio	Finalists	
2016	Rebecca L. Johnson	Masters of Disguise: Amazing Animal Tricksters	Finalists	
2016	Erin Hagar	The Inventors of LEGO Toys	Finalists	
2016	April Pulley Sayre	The Slowest Book Ever	Finalists	
2016	Jane Sutcliffe	Will's Words: How William Shakespeare Changed the Way You Talk	Finalists	

==== Middle grade and young adult (2006–2012) ====
Year	Author	Title	Ref.
2006	Russell Freedman	Freedom Walkers: The Story of the Montgomery Bus Boycott	
2007	Ibtisam Barakat	Tasting the Sky: A Palestinian Childhood	
2008	Cylin Busby and John Busby	The Year We Disappeared: A Father-Daughter Memoir	
2009	Pamela S. Turner, illustrated by Andy Comins	The Frog Scientist	
2010	Suzanne Jurmain	The Secret of the Yellow Death: A True Story of Medical Sleuthing	
2011	Candace Fleming	Amelia Lost: The Life and Disappearance of Amelia Earhart	
2012	Steve Sheinkin	Bomb: The Race to Build—and Steal—the World's Most Dangerous Weapon	

==== Elementary and middle grade (2013–2015) ====
Year	Author	Title	Ref.
2013	Annette LeBlanc Cate	Look Up!: Bird-Watching in Your Own Backyard	
2014	Melissa Stewart	Feathers: Not Just for Flying	
2015	Bridget Heos, illustrated by Jennifer Plecas	I, Fly: The Buzz About Flies and How Awesome They Are	

==== Elementary (2016–) ====
Year	Author	Title	Ref.
2016	Candace Fleming	Giant Squid	
2017	Caroline Arnold	Hatching Chicks in Room 6	
2018	Patricia Valdez, illus. by Felicita Sala	Joan Procter, Dragon Doctor	
2019	Miranda Paul, illus. by Jason Chin	Nine Months: Before a Baby Is Born	
2020	Kate Messner and Adam Rex	The Next President: The Unexpected Beginnings and Unwritten Future of America's presidents	
2021	Megan Hoyt, illus. by Iacopo Bruno	Bartali's Bicycle: The True Story of Gino Bartali, Italy's Secret Hero	
2022	Matt Lilley, illus. by Dan Tavis	Good Eating: The Short Life of Krill	
2023	Jessica Lanan	Jumper: A Day in the Life of a Backyard Jumping Spider	
2024	G. Neri, illustrated by Corban Wilkin	My Antarctica: True Adventures in the Land of Mummified Seals, Space Robots, and So Much More	

==== Middle grade (2016–) ====
Year	Author	Title	Ref.
2016	Caren Stelson	Sachiko: A Nagasaki Bomb Survivor's Story	
2017	Ammi-Joan Paquette	Two Truths and a Lie: It's Alive!	
2018	Kelly Milner Halls	Death Eaters: Meet Nature's Scavengers	
2019	Trevor Noah	Born a Crime: Stories from a South African Childhood (Adapted)	
2020	Christina Soontornvat	All Thirteen: The Incredible Cave Rescue of the Thai Boys' Soccer Team	
2021	Rochelle Melander, illus. by Melina Ontiveros	Mightier Than the Sword: Rebels, Reformers, and Revolutionaries Who Changed the World Through Writing	
2022	Angela Joy, illus. by Janelle Washington	Choosing Brave: How Mamie Till-Mobley and Emmett Till Sparked the Civil Rights Movement	
2023	Nicholas Day, illustrated by Brett Helquist	The Mona Lisa Vanishes: A Legendary Painter, a Shocking Heist, and the Birth of a Global Celebrity	
2024	Rowena Rae and Paige Stampatori	Why We Need Vaccines: How Humans Beat Infectious Diseases	

==== Junior high (2017–2019) ====
Year	Author	Title	Ref.
2017	Martin W. Sandler	The Whydah: A Pirate Ship Feared, Wrecked, and Found	
2018	Elizabeth Partridge	Boots on the Ground: America's War in Vietnam	
2019	Ian Lendler	The First Dinosaur: How Science Solved the Greatest Mystery on Earth	

==== Young adult (2013–2016) ====
Year	Author	Title	Ref.
2013	Martin W. Sandler	Imprisoned: The Betrayal of Japanese Americans during World War II	
2014	Candace Fleming	The Family Romanov: Murder, Rebellion, and the Fall of Imperial Russia	
2015	Steve Sheinkin	Most Dangerous: Daniel Ellsberg and the Secret History of the Vietnam War	
2016	Sungju Lee	Every Falling Star: The True Story of How I Survived and Escaped North Korea	

==== Senior high (2017–) ====
Year	Author(s)	Title	Ref.
2017	Deborah Heiligman	Vincent and Theo: The Van Gogh Brothers	
2018	John Hendrix	The Faithful Spy: Dietrich Bonhoeffer and the Plot to Kill Hitler	
2019	James Rhodes, illus. by Martin O'Neill	Playlist: The Rebels and Revolutionaries of Sound	
2020	Jason Reynolds and Ibram X. Kendi	Stamped: Racism, Antiracism, and You	
2021	Rex Ogle	Punching Bag	
2022	Amy Butler Greenfield	The Woman All Spies Fear: Code Breaker Elizebeth Smith Friedman and Her Hidden Life	
2023	Steve Sheinkin	Impossible Escape: A True Story of Survival and Heroism in Nazi Europe	
2024	Sherri L. Smith and Elizabeth Wein	American Wings: Chicago's Pioneering Black Aviators and the Race for Equality in the Sky	

=== Novels in verse (2022–) ===
Year	Author(s)	Title	Result	Ref.
2022	Diana Farid, illus. by Kris Goto	Wave	Winner	
2022	Charles Waters and Irene Latham	African Town	Finalist	
2022	Katherine Applegate, illustrated by Charles Santos	Odder	Finalist	
2022	Margarita Engle	Singing with Elephants	Finalist	
2022	Amanda Rawson Hill	The Hope of Elephants	Finalist	
2023	Cindy Baldwin	No Matter the Distance	Winner	
2023	Hannah V. Sawyerr	All the Fighting Parts	Finalist	
2023	Reem Faruqi	Call Me Adnan	Finalist	
2023	Joy McCullough	Enter the Body	Finalist	
2023	Charles Waters and Traci Sorell	Mascot	Finalist	
2024	Shifa Saltagi Safadi	Kareem Between	Winner	
2024	Lisa Fipps	And Then, Boom!	Finalist	
2024	Ann E. Burg, illustrated by Sophie Blackall	Force of Nature: A Novel of Rachel Carson	Finalist	
2024	John Schu	Louder Than Hunger	Finalist	
2024	Alicia D. Williams, illustrated by Danica Novgorodoff	Mid-Air	Finalist	
2024	Jeff Zentner and Brittany Cavallaro	Sunrise Nights	Finalist	
2024	Kelly Hollman and Charlotte Watson Sherman	This Opening Sky	Finalist	

=== Poetry (2006–) ===
Year	Author(s)	Title	Result	Ref.
2006	Joyce Sidman, illus. by Beth Krommes	Butterfly Eyes and Other Secrets of the Meadow	Winner	
2006	Adam Rex	Frankenstein Makes a Sandwich	Finalists	
2006	Douglas Florian	Handsprings	Finalists	
2006	Walter Dean Myers, illus. by Christopher Myers	Jazz	Finalists	
2006	Diane Siebert, illus. by Stephen T. Johnson	Tour America: A Journey Through Poems and Art	Finalists	
2007	Joyce Sidman, illus. by Pamela Zagarenski	This is Just to Say	Winner	
2007	Valerie Worth, illus. by Steve Jenkins	Animal Poems	Finalists	
2007	Laura Amy Schlitz, illus. by Robert Byrd	Good Masters! Sweet Ladies!	Finalists	
2007	Jane Yolen and Andrew Fusek Peters (eds.), illus. by Polly Dunbar	Here's a Little Poem	Finalists	
2007	Kate Miller	Poems in Black and White	Finalists	
2007	Janet S. Wong, illus. by Julie Paschkis	Twist: Yoga Poems	Finalists	
2007	Stephanie Hemphill	Your Own, Sylvia	Finalists	
2008	Naomi Shihab Nye	Honeybee: poems	Winner	
2008	Lee Bennett Hopkins (ed.), illus. by Stephen Alcorn	America at War	Finalists	
2008	Julie Larios, illus. by Julie Paschkis	Imaginary Menagerie	Finalists	
2008	Sara Holbrook and Allan Wolf	More than Friends	Finalists	
2008	David Elliott and Holly Meade	On the Farm	Finalists	
2009	Joyce Sidman, illus. by Pamela Zagarenski	Red Sings from Treetops	Winner	
2009	Avis Harley	African Acrostics	Finalist	
2009	Bill Martin Jr.	The Bill Martin Jr Big Book of Poetry	Finalist	
2009	Bobbi Katz	The Monsterologist	Finalist	
2009	Mary Ann Hoberman and Linda Winston	The Tree That Time Built	Finalist	
2010	Marilyn Singer, illus. by Maggi Idzikowski	Mirror Mirror	Winner	
2010	Jeannine Atkins	Borrowed Names	Finalist	
2010	Joyce Sidman	Dark Emperor and Other Poems of the Night	Finalist	
2010	Jessica Swaim	Scarum Fair	Finalist	
2010	Lee Bennett Hopkins (ed.)	Sharing the Seasons: A Book of Poems	Finalist	
2010	Jane Yolen and Andrew Fusek Peters	Switching on the Moon	Finalist	
2010	Joyce Sidman	Ubiquitous: Celebrating Nature's Survivors	Finalist	
2011	Paul B. Janeczko	Requiem	Winner	
2011	Tracie Vaughn Zimmer	Cousins of Clouds: Elephant Poems	Finalist	
2011	Mordicai Gerstein	Dear Hot Dog	Finalist	
2011	Kristine O'Connell George	Emma Dilemma: Big Sister Poems	Finalist	
2011	J. Patrick Lewis and Jane Yolen	Self-Portrait With Seven Fingers	Finalist	
2011	Walter Dean Myers	We Are America: A Tribute from the Heart	Finalist	
2012	Laura Purdie Salas, illus. by Josée Bisaillon	BookSpeak! Poems About Books	Winner	
2012	David Elliott	In the Sea	Finalist	
2012	J. Patrick Lewis	Last Laughs: Animal Epitaphs	Finalist	
2012	Ron Koertge	Lies, Knives, and Girls in Red Dresses	Finalist	
2012	National Geographic	National Geographic Book of Animal Poetry	Finalist	
2012	Douglas Florian	UnBEElievables: Honeybee Poems and Paintings	Finalist	
2012	Kate Coombs	Water Sings Blue	Finalist	
2013	Amy Ludwig VanDerwater	Forest Has a Song	Winner	
2013	Singer	Follow Follow	Finalist	
2013	Caroline Kennedy	Poems to Learn by Heart	Finalist	
2013	Valerie Worth	Pug: And Other Animal Poems	Finalist	
2013	Lisa Wheeler	The Pet Project	Finalist	
2013	Joyce Sidman	What the Heart Knows: Chants, Charms, and Blessings	Finalist	
2013	J. Patrick Lewis	When Thunder Comes: Poems for Civil Rights Leaders	Finalist	
2014	J. Patrick Lewis and George Ella Lyon	Voices from the March on Washington	Winner	
2014	Jacqueline Woodson	Brown Girl Dreaming	Finalist	
2014	Irene Latham	Dear Wandering Wildebeest: And Other Poems from the Water Hole	Finalist	
2014	Janeczko	Firefly July: A Year of Very Short Poems	Finalist	
2014	Jon J Muth	Hi, Koo!: A Year of Seasons	Finalist	
2014	Bob Raczka	Santa Clauses: Short Poems from the North Pole	Finalist	
2014	Pat Mora	Water Rolls, Water Rises: El agua rueda, el agua sube	Finalist	
2015	Paschkis	Flutter and Hum / Aleteo y Zumbido: Animal Poems / Poemas de Animales	Winner	
2015	Marilyn Hilton	Full Cicada Moon	Finalist	
2015	K. A. Holt	House Arrest	Finalist	
2015	J. Patrick Lewis	National Geographic Book of Nature Poetry: More than 200 Poems With Photographs That Float, Zoom, and Bloom!	Finalist	
2015	Meg Wiviott	Paper Hearts	Finalist	
2015	Deborah Ruddell	The Popcorn Astronauts: And Other Biteable Rhymes	Finalist	
2015	Joyce Sidman	Winter Bees & Other Poems of the Cold	Finalist	
2016	Laura Shovan	The Last Fifth Grade of Emerson Elementary	Winner	
2016	Alexander	Booked	Finalist	
2016	Irene Latham	Fresh Delicious	Finalist	
2016	Grimes	Garvey's Choice	Finalist	
2016	Deanna Caswell	Guess Who, Haiku	Finalist	
2016	Skila Brown	To Stay Alive: Mary Ann Graves and the Tragic Journey of the Donner Party	Finalist	
2016	Julie Fogliano	When Green Becomes Tomatoes: Poems for All Seasons	Finalist	
2017	Chris Harris	I'm Just No Good at Rhyming: And Other Nonsense for Mischievous Kids and Immature Grown-Ups	Winner	
2017	David Elliott	Bull	Finalist	
2017	Schaub	Fresh-Picked Poetry: A Day at the Farmers' Market	Finalist	
2017	J. Patrick Lewis	Keep a Pocket in Your Poem: Classic Poems and Playful Parodies	Finalist	
2017	Margarita Engle	Miguel's Brave Knight: Young Cervantes and His Dream of Don Quixote	Finalist	
2017	Nikki Grimes	One Last Word: Wisdom from the Harlem Renaissance	Finalist	
2017	Kwame Alexander	Out of Wonder: Poems Celebrating Poets	Finalist	
2018	Jason Reynolds	Long Way Down	Winner	
2018	Irene Latham and Charles Waters, illus. by Sean Qualls and Selina Alko	Can I Touch Your Hair?: Poems of Race, Mistakes, and Friendship	Finalist	
2018	Sydell Rosenberg	H Is For Haiku: A Treasury of Haiku from A to Z	Finalist	
2018	David Elliott	In the Past: From Trilobites to Dinosaurs to Mammoths in More Than 500 Million Years	Finalist	
2018	Lita Judge	Mary's Monster: Love, Madness, and How Mary Shelley Created Frankenstein	Finalist	
2018	Elizabeth Acevedo	The Poet X	Finalist	
2018		Traveling the Blue Road: Poems of the Sea	Finalist	
2019	Vecchione and Alyssa Raymond (eds.)	Ink Knows No Borders: Poems of the Immigrant and Refugee Experience	Winner	
2019	Margarita Engle	Dreams from Many Rivers: A Hispanic History of the United States Told in Poems	Finalist	
2019	Nikki Grimes	Ordinary Hazards: A Memoir	Finalist	
2019	Jasmine Warga	Other Words for Home	Finalist	
2019	Laurie Halse Anderson	SHOUT	Finalist	
2019	Elizabeth Steinglass	Soccerverse: Poems about Soccer	Finalist	
2019	Paul B. Janeczko	The Proper Way to Meet a Hedgehog and Other How-To Poems	Finalist	
2020	No award was presented in 2020			
2021	Joanne Rossmassler Fritz	Everywhere Blue	Winner	
2021	Colby Cedar Smith	Call Me Athena: Girl from Detroit	Finalist	
2021	Amber McBride	Me (Moth)	Finalist	
2021	Rajani LaRocca	Red, White, and Whole	Finalist	
2021	Kirsten Hall, illus. by Jenni Desmond	Snow Birds	Finalist	
2021	Lisa Fipps	Starfish	Finalist	
2021	Diana Whitney (ed.)	You Don't Have to Be Everything: Poems for Girls Becoming Themselves	Finalist	
2022	Nikole Hannah-Jones and Renée Watson, illus. by Nikkolas Smith	The 1619 Project: Born on the Water	Winner	
2023	Suzy Levinson, illustrated by Kevin and Kristen Howdeshell	Animals in Pants	Winner	
2023	Crystal Simone Smith	Dark Testament: Blackout Poems	Finalist	
2023	Chris Harris, illustrated by Andrea Tsurumi	My Head Has a Bellyache: And More Nonsense for Mischievous Kids and Immature Grown-Ups	Finalist	
2023	Rebecca Kai Dotlich and Georgia Heard, illustrated by Deborah Freedman	Welcome to the Wonder House	Finalist	
2023	Paul B. Janeczko, illustrated by Hyewon Yum	Where I Live: Poems About My Home, My Street, and My Town	Finalist	
2024	Renée Watson, illustrated by Ekua Holmes	Black Girl You Are Atlas	Winner	
2024	Amanda West Lewis, illustrated by Oliver Averill	A Planet Is a Poem	Finalist	
2024	Sylvia Vardell and Janet Wong, illustrated by Frank Ramspott	Clara's Kooky Compendium of Thimblethoughts and Wonderfuzz	Finalist	
2024	Naomi Shihab Nye	Grace Notes: Poems about Families	Finalist	
2024	Lynn Brunelle, illustrated by Julia Patton	Haiku, Ew!: Celebrating the Disgusting Side of Nature	Finalist	
2024	Grant Snider	Poetry Comics	Finalist	
2024	Douglas Florian	Windsongs: Poems about Weather	Finalist	
