= Anna Branford =

Children's book author

- Born: 1975 (age 50–51) Isle of Man
- Occupation: Writer
- Genre: Children's books
- Notable works: Violet Mackerel series

Website
- annabranford.com

Anna Branford (born 1975 on the Isle of Man) is an author of children's books, known for her Violet Mackerel early chapter books. She is also a doll maker and teaches sociology at Victoria University.

== Biography ==
Branford was born in 1975 on the Isle of Man and spent her childhood there, as well as in Sudan, Papua New Guinea, and Australia. She presently lives in Melbourne.

== Awards and honours ==
Four of Branford's books are Junior Library Guild selections: Violet Mackerel’s Remarkable Recovery (2013), Violet Mackerel’s Personal Space (2014), Violet Mackerel’s Possible Friend (2014), and Violet Mackerel’s Pocket Protest (2014).

Awards for Branford's writing
Year	Title	Award	Result	Ref.
2011	Violet Mackerel's Brilliant Plot	Children's Book Council of Australia Award for Younger Readers Book of the Year	Honour	
2012	Neville No-Phone	Children's Book Council of Australia Award for Younger Readers Book of the Year	Notable	
2012	Violet Mackerel's Brilliant Plot	Cybils Award for Early Chapter Books	Finalist	
2012	Violet Mackerel’s Natural Habitat	Children's Book Council of Australia Award for Younger Readers Book of the Year	Notable	
2013	Violet Mackerel’s Natural Habitat	Cybils Award for Early Chapter Books	Finalist	
2013	Violet Mackerel’s Personal Space	Children's Peace Literature Award for Junior Readers	Shortlist	
2013	Violet Mackerel’s Personal Space	Australian Family Therapists’ Awards for Young Readers/Picture Book Award	Winner	
2014	Violet Mackerel's Possible Friend	Children's Book Council of Australia Award for Younger Readers Book of the Year	Shortlist	
2014	Violet Mackerel's Possible Friend	Cybils Award for Early Chapter Books	Finalist	
2017	Lilli-Pilli's Sister	REAL Award for Picture Story Books	Shortlist	

== Publications ==
=== Standalone books ===
- Sophie's Salon, illustrated by Cheryl Orsini (Puffin Books, 2010, ISBN 9780143304821)
- Neville No-Phone, illustrated by Kat Chadwick (Walker Books, 2011, ISBN 9781921529962)
- Lilli-Pilli's Sister, illustrated by Linda Catchlove (Walker Books, 2014, ISBN 9781921977589)

=== Lily the Elf series ===
The Lily the Elf books are illustrated by Lisa Coutts and published by Walker Books.

1. The Midnight Owl (Walker Books, 2015, ISBN 9781925081053)
2. The Precious Ring (Walker Books, 2015, ISBN 9781925081046)
3. The Wishing Seed (Walker Books, 2015, ISBN 9781925081060)
4. The Elf Flute (Walker Books, 2015, ISBN 9781925081077)
5. The Jumble Sale (Walker Books, 2016, ISBN 9781925381153)
6. The Sleepover (Walker Books, 2016, ISBN 9781458743459)

=== Violet Mackerel series ===
The Violet Mackerel books are illustrated by Elanna Allen

1. Violet Mackerel's Brilliant Plot (Walker Books, 2010, ISBN 9781921529177)
2. Violet Mackerel's Remarkable Recovery (Walker Books, 2011, ISBN 9781921529184)
3. Violet Mackerel's Natural Habitat (Walker Books, 2011, ISBN 9781921529191)
4. Violet Mackerel's Personal Space (Walker Books, 2012, ISBN 9781921529207)
5. Violet Mackerel's Possible Friend (Walker Books, 2013, ISBN 9781921977565)
6. Violet Mackerel's Pocket Protest (Walker Books, 2013, ISBN 9781921977572)
7. Violet Mackerel's Helpful Suggestion (Walker Books, 2014, ISBN 9781922244369)
8. Violet Mackerel's Formal Occasion (Walker Books, 2015, ISBN 9781925081091)
