= Mascot (book) =

2023 book

- Author: Charles Waters and Traci Sorell
- Publisher: Charlesbridge Publishing
- Publication date: September 5, 2023

Mascot is a 2023 children's novel by Charles Waters and Traci Sorell.

== Plot summary ==
The novel is set in the fictional town of Rye, Virginia where middle schooler Callie Crossland has recently moved. Callie, who is a Black member of the Cherokee Nation, is dismayed that the middle school's mascot is a racial caricature of an "Indian Brave". After Callie reads out a poem criticizing the mascot, her English teacher Ms. Williams assigns the class a project where they debate the merits of the mascot. The novel follows the alternating perspectives of six students involved in the controversy.

== Reception ==
The book was praised by critics for its handling of different perspectives, and open-ended narrative.

== See also ==
- Native American mascot controversy
