= What Will Fat Cat Sit On? =

Book by Jan Thomas

- Front cover
- Author: Jan Thomas
- Language: English
- Genre: Children's picture book
- Publisher: Harcourt
- Publication date: 2007
- Publication place: United States
- Pages: 32
- ISBN: 9780152060510

What Will Fat Cat Sit On? is a 2007 children's picture book by Jan Thomas and published by Harcourt, Inc.

== Plot ==
Fat Cat wonders what to sit on. The animals are relieved that the cat will not sit on them, but they wonder about what the cat will have for lunch. The animals run off in terror.

== Reception ==
A Publishers Weekly review says, "Eschewing anything that smacks of a setting (except for the comfy chair to which Fat Cat is directed) she renders her barnyard characters in super-saturated colors and thick, bold outlines. Mood swings generally have a bad name these days, but Thomas makes them a hoot". Elizabeth Bird of School Library Journal reviewed the book saying, "Arguably the best of the overweight kitty genre, this is a crowd pleaser and bound to be a children's librarian's new best friend. Funny furry stuff". Tasha Saecker, of Menasha Library, reviewed the book saying, "One of the best and easiest readers out there. Pick this up for your preschooler or kindergartener who is starting to read".
