= Charles Waters (writer) =

American author and poet

- Occupations: Author of poetry and children's literature
- Notable work: Mascot (2023); African Town (2022)
- Website: www.charleswaterspoetry.com

Charles Waters is an American writer. His works include African Town (2022), Mascot (2023), and The Mistakes That Made Us (2024).

== Early life ==
Waters began his career as a theater actor and performed in regional productions of Shakespeare after graduating from college. He was hired to perform as part of Poetry Alive! when he was 29, and afterwards began writing poetry. He also worked as an actor at Walt Disney World. He took a poetry workshop taught by Lee Bennett Hopkins, who invited him to submit a poem about Fenway Park for a poetry anthology.

== Writing career ==
Waters collaborated with poet Irene Latham on a poetry collection about how race influences childhood friendships. The collection was published in 2018 as Can I Touch Your Hair? Poems of Race, Mistakes and Friendship. They later published The Mistakes That Made Us: Confessions from Twenty Poets in 2024. He subsequently collaborated with Latham on the children's books Dictionary For A Better World (2020), Be A Bridge (2022), and If I Could Choose A Best Day (2025). In 2022, they co-authored the young adult novel African Town.

Waters co-wrote Mascot, a novel about a high school debate around racially insensitive mascots, with Traci Sorell in 2023.
