= J. Patrick Lewis =

American poet and children's author

J. Patrick Lewis (born May 5, 1942) is an American poet and prose writer noted for his children's poems and other light verse. He worked as professor of economics from 1974 to 1998, after which he devoted himself full-time to writing.

== Awards ==
Lewis has received the 2013 Claudia Lewis Award, the 2014 Cybils Award for Poetry, the Society of Children Book Writers and Illustrators (SCBWI) Golden Kite Award for Picture Book Text (2002), the Ohioana Book Award for Poetry for Young Children (2015), and others. He was the recipient of the 2010–11 National Council of Teachers of English (NCTE) Excellence in Children's Poetry Award, presented every two years. He also served from 2011 to 2013 as the third U.S. Children's Poet Laureate (now called the Young People's Poet Laureate).

== Works ==
- Lewis, J. Patrick (1988). The Tsar and the Amazing Cow. New York: Dial. OP
- Lewis, J. Patrick (1990). A Hippopotamusn't; and Other Animal Verses. New York: Dial. OP
- Lewis, J. Patrick (1991). Two-legged, Four-legged, No-legged Rhymes. New York: Knopf. OP
- Lewis, J. Patrick (1991). Earth Verses and Water Rhymes. New York: Atheneum. OP
- Lewis, J. Patrick (1992). The Moonbow of Mr. B. Bones. New York: Knopf. OP
- Lewis, J. Patrick (1993). One Dog Day. New York: Atheneum. OP
- Lewis, J. Patrick (1994). The Frog Princess: A Russian Folktale. New York: Dial. OP
- Lewis, J. Patrick (1994). July Is a Mad Mosquito. New York: Atheneum. OP
- Lewis, J. Patrick (1994). The Christmas of the Reddle Moon. (Illustrated by Gary Kelley). New York: Dial. OP
- Lewis, J. Patrick (1994). The Fat-Cats at Sea. New York: Knopf. OP
- Lewis, J. Patrick (1995). Ridicholas Nicholas. New York: Dial. OP
- Lewis, J. Patrick (1995). Black Swan/White Crow. New York: Atheneum.
- Lewis, J. Patrick (1996). Riddle-icious. New York: Knopf. OP
- Lewis, J. Patrick (1996). The Boat of Many Rooms. New York: Atheneum. OP
- Lewis, J. Patrick (1997). The La-Di-Da Hare. New York: Dial. OP
- Lewis, J. Patrick (1997). Long Was the Winter Road They Traveled: A Tale of the Nativity. New York: Dial. OP
- Lewis, J. Patrick (1997). The Little Buggers: Insect and Spider Poems. New York: Dial. OP
- Lewis, J. Patrick (1998). Riddle-lightful. New York: Knopf. OP
- Lewis, J. Patrick (1998). The House of Boo. New York: Atheneum. OP
- Lewis, J. Patrick (1998). Doodle Dandies: Poems That Take Shape. New York: Atheneum.
- Lewis, J. Patrick (1998). BoshBlobberBosh: Runcible Poems for Edward Lear. (Illustrated by Gary Kelley). New York: Harcourt.
- Lewis, J. Patrick (1999). At the Wish of the Fish: An Adaptation of a Russian Folktale,. New York: Atheneum. OP
- Lewis, J. Patrick (1999). The Bookworm's Feast: A Potluck of Poems. New York: Dial.
- Lewis, J. Patrick (1999). The Night of the Goat Children. New York: Dial. OP
- Lewis, J. Patrick (2000). Isabella Abnormella and the Very, Very Finicky Queen of Trouble. New York: DK Publishing. OP
- Lewis, J. Patrick (2000). Freedom like Sunlight: Praisesongs for Black Americans. Mankato, MN: Creative Editions.
- Lewis, J. Patrick (2001). Good Mousekeeping; and Other Animal Home Poems. New York: Atheneum. OP
- Lewis, J. Patrick (2001). A Burst of Firsts: Doers, Shakers, and Record Breakers. New York: Dial. OP
- Lewis, J. Patrick (2001). The Shoe Tree of Chagrin. Mankato, MN: Creative Editions. OP
- Lewis, J. Patrick (2001). Earth and You, a Closer View: Nature's Features. Nevada City, CA: Dawn Publications. OP
- Lewis, J. Patrick (2001). Earth and Us, Continuous: Nature's Past and Future. Nevada City, CA: Dawn Publications. OP
- Lewis, J. Patrick (2002). Arithme-tickle: An Even Number of Odd Riddle-Rhymes. New York: Harcourt.
- Lewis, J. Patrick (2002). A World of Wonders: Geographic Travels in Verse and Rhyme. New York: Dial. OP
- Lewis, J. Patrick (2002). The Last Resort. (Illustrated by Roberto Innocenti). Mankato, MN: Creative Editions.
- Lewis, J. Patrick (2002). Earth and Me, Our Family Tree. Nevada City, CA: Dawn Publications. OP
- Lewis, J. Patrick (2003). The Snowflake Sisters. New York: Atheneum.
- Lewis, J. Patrick (2003). Galileo's Universe. Mankato, MN: Creative Editions.
- Lewis, J. Patrick (2003). Swan Songs: Poems of Extinction. Mankato, MN: Creative Editions.
- Lewis, J. Patrick (2004). Scien-trickery: Riddles in Science. Orlando: Silver Whistle/Harcourt.
- Lewis, J. Patrick (2004). Please Bury Me in the Library. New York: Harcourt.
- Lewis, J. Patrick (2004). The Stolen Smile. (Illustrated by Gary Kelley). Mankato, MN: Creative Editions.
- Lewis, J. Patrick (2005). Vherses: A Celebration of Outstanding Women. Mankato, MN: Creative Editions.
- Lewis, J. Patrick (2005). Monumental Verses. Washington, DC: National Geographic.
- Lewis, J. Patrick (2005). God Made the Skunk; and Other Animal Poems. Cupertino, CA: Doggerel Daze.
- Lewis, J. Patrick (2005). Heroes and She-roes: Poems of Amazing and Everyday Heroes. New York: Dial.
- Lewis, J. Patrick (2006). Once Upon a Tomb: Gravely Humorous Verses. Cambridge, MA: Candlewick.
- Lewis, J. Patrick (2006). Blackbeard the Pirate King. Washington, DC: National Geographic.
- Lewis, J. Patrick (2006). Black Cat Bone: The Life of Blues Legend Robert Johnson. (Illustrated by Gary Kelley). Mankato, MN: Creative Editions.
- Lewis, J. Patrick (2006). Good Mornin', Ms. America: The U.S.A. in Verse. School Specialty Publishing.
- Lewis, J. Patrick (2006). Castles: Old Stone Poems. (With Rebecca Kai Dotlich), Honesdale, PA: Boyds Mills Press/Wordsong.
- Lewis, J. Patrick (2006). Wing Nuts: Screwy Haiku. (With Paul B. Janeczko), Boston: Little, Brown. OP
- Lewis, J. Patrick (2007). The Brothers' War: Civil War Voices in Verse. Washington, D.C.: National Geographic.
- Lewis, J. Patrick (2007). Tulip at the Bat. Boston: Little, Brown. OP
- Lewis, J. Patrick (2007). Big Is Big and Little Little: A Book of Contrasts. New York: Holiday House.
- Lewis, J. Patrick (2007). Michelangelo’s World. Mankato, MN: Creative Editions.
- Lewis, J. Patrick (2007). Poems for Teaching in the Content Areas: Math, Science, History and Geography. New York: Scholastic Teaching Resources.
- Lewis, J. Patrick (2007). Under the Kissletoe. Honesdale, PA: Boyd Mills Press/Wordsong.
- Lewis, J. Patrick (2008). Birds on a Wire: A Renga 'Round the Town. (With Paul B. Janeczko), Boyds Mills Press/Wordsong.
- Lewis, J. Patrick (2008). The World's Greatest: Poems. San Francisco, CA: Chronicle Books.
- Lewis, J. Patrick (2009). The House. (Illustrated by Roberto Innocenti). Mankato, MN: Creative Editions.
- Lewis, J. Patrick (2009). Spot the Plot! A Riddle Book of Book Riddles. San Francisco: Chronicle Books.
- Lewis, J. Patrick (2009). First Dog. (With Beth Zappitello), Chelsea, MI: Sleeping Bear Press.
- Lewis, J. Patrick (2009). Countdown to Summer: A Poem for Every Day of the School Year. New York: Little, Brown.
- Lewis, J. Patrick (2009). The Underwear Salesman; and Other Odd-Job Verses. New York: Simon & Schuster.
- Lewis, J. Patrick (2010). Gulls Hold Up the Sky. LaJolla, CA: Laughing Fire Press (adult poems).
- Lewis, J. Patrick (2010). Kindergarten Cat. New York, NY: Schwartz & Wade/Random House.
- Lewis, J. Patrick (2010). The Fantastic 5&10 Cent Store. New York, NY: Schwartz & Wade/Random House.
- Lewis, J. Patrick (2010). Skywriting: Poems in Flight. Mankato, MN: Creative Editions.
- Lewis, J. Patrick (2010). First Dog's White House Christmas. Chelsea, MI: Sleeping Bear Press.
- Lewis, J. Patrick (2011). Self-Portrait with Seven Fingers: A Life of Marc Chagall in Verse. (With Jane Yolen.) Mankato, MN: Creative Editions.
- Lewis, J. Patrick (2011). And the Soldiers Sang (Illustrated by Gary Kelley). Mankato, MN: Creative Editions.
- Lewis, J. Patrick (2012). Tugg & Teeny" (book #3). Chelsea, MI: Sleeping Bear Press.
- Lewis, J. Patrick (2011). Tugg & Teeny" (book #2). Chelsea, MI: Sleeping Bear Press.
- Lewis, J. Patrick (2011). Tugg & Teeny" (book #1). Chelsea, MI: Sleeping Bear Press.
- Lewis, J. Patrick (2012). When Thunder Comes: Poems for Civil Rights Leaders. San Francisco, CA: Chronicle Books.
- Lewis, J. Patrick (2012). If You Were a Chocolate Mustache: Poems. Honesdale, PA: Wordsong/Boyds Mills Press.
- Lewis, J. Patrick (2012). The National Geographic Book of Animal Poems. Washington, D.C.: National Geographic.
- Lewis, J. Patrick (2012). Last Laughs: Animal Epitaphs. (With Jane Yolen.) Watertown, MA: Charlesbridge.
- Lewis, J. Patrick (2012). Take Two! A Celebration of Twins. (With Jane Yolen.) Cambridge, MA.: Candlewick.
- Lewis, J. Patrick (2012). Edgar Allan Poe's Pie: Math Puzzler in Classic Poems. New York, NY: Harcourt.
- Lewis, J. Patrick (2012). What's Looking at You, Kid? Chelsea, MI: Sleeping Bear Press.
- Lewis, J. Patrick (2013). The Good Ship Crocodile. Mankato, MN: Creative Editions.
- Lewis, J. Patrick (2013). World Rat Day: Poems About Real Holidays You've Never Heard Of. Somerville, MA: Candlewick Press.
- Lewis, J. Patrick (2013). Face Bug. (Photographs by Frederic B. Siskind. Illustrated by Kelly Murphy.) Honesdale, PA: Wordsong/Boyds Mills Press.
- Lewis, J. Patrick (2014). Everything Is a Poem: The Best of J. Patrick Lewis. Mankato, MN: Creative Editions.
- Lewis, J. Patrick (2014). Freedom Like Sunlight: Praisesongs for Black Americans. (new release) Mankato, MN: Creative Editions.
- Lewis, J. Patrick (2014). M Is for Monster: A Fantastic Creatures Alphabet. Ann Arbor, MI: Sleeping Bear Press.
- Lewis, J. Patrick (2014). Voices from the March on Washington, 1963. Honesdale, PA: Wordsong/Boyds Mills Press.
- Lewis, J. Patrick (2014). Harlem Hellfighters. (Illustrated by Gary Kelley). Mankato, MN: Creative Editions.
- Lewis, J. Patrick (2014). Poem-mobiles: Crazy Car Poems. (With Douglas Florian). New York: Schwartz & Wade/Random House.
- Lewis, J. Patrick (2015). Book of Nature Poetry. Washington, DC: National Geographic.
- Lewis, J. Patrick (2015). The Wren and the Sparrow. Minneapolis, MN: Kar-Ben Publishing.
- Lewis, J. Patrick (2015). The Stolen Smile. Mankato, MN: Creative Editions (reissue).
- Lewis, J. Patrick (2015). Bigfoot Is Missing: Poems from the Cryptozoo. (w/Kenn Nesbitt), San Francisco: Chronicle Books.
- Lewis, J. Patrick (2015). Just Joking: Animal Riddles. Washington, DC.: National Geographic.
- Lewis, J. Patrick (2016). Porch Light (adult poems). LaJolla, CA: Laughing Fire Press.
- Lewis, J. Patrick (2016). The Navajo Code Talkers. (Illustrated by Gary Kelley). Mankato, MN: Creative Editions.
- Lewis, J. Patrick (2016). Kooky Crumbs. Tulsa, OK: Kane Miller.
- Lewis, J. Patrick (2017). Make the Earth Your Companion. Mankato, MN.: Creative Editions.
- Lewis, J. Patrick (2017). Keep a Pocket in Your Poem (parodies). Honesdale, PA: Wordsong/Boyds Mills Press.
- Lewis, J. Patrick (2017). Last Laughs: Prehistoric Epitaphs. (With Jane Yolen.) Watertown, MA.: Charlesbridge.
- Lewis, J. Patrick (2017). It's Not the Baby. (With Leigh Lewis.) Mankato, MN: Creative Editions/Amicus Books.
- Lewis, J. Patrick (2017). My Home is on the Ice. New York: Scholastic Library.
- Lewis, J. Patrick (2017). My Home is in the Desert. New York: Scholastic Library.
- Lewis, J. Patrick (2017). My Home is in the Water. New York: Scholastic Library.
- Lewis, J. Patrick (2017). My Home is in the Rainforest. New York: Scholastic Library.
- Lewis, J. Patrick (2018). The Poetry of Us: More than 200 poems about people, places, and passions of the United States. National Geographic.
- Lewis, J. Patrick (2018). Ph(r)ases of the Moon: Lunar Poems. Mankato, MN: Creative Editions.
- Lewis, J. Patrick (2018). It's Not the Puppy. (With Leigh Lewis.) Mankato, MN; Creative Editions/Amicus Books.
- Lewis, J. Patrick (2018). Let's Celebrate Christmas. New York: Scholastic Library.
- Lewis, J. Patrick (2018). Let's Celebrate Valentine's Day. New York: Scholastic Library.
- Lewis, J. Patrick (2018). Let's Celebrate Halloween. New York: Scholiastic Library.
- Lewis, J. Patrick (2018). Let's Celebrate Thanksgiving. New York: Scholastic Library.
- Lewis, J. Patrick (2019). I Am Polar Bear. Mankato, MN: Creative Editions.
- Lewis, J. Patrick (2021). I Am Elephant. Mankato, MN: Creative Editions.

OP = out of print
