= Let's Count Goats! =

Australian children's picture book by Mem Fox and Jan Thomas

- Author: Mem Fox
- Illustrator: Jan Thomas
- Language: English
- Genre: Children's picture book
- Published: 2010 (Penguin Group, Beach Lane Books)
- Publication place: Australia
- Media type: Print (hardback)
- Pages: 36 (unpaginated)
- ISBN: 9780670075058
- OCLC: 646270472

Let's Count Goats! is a 2010 children's picture book by Mem Fox and illustrated by Jan Thomas. It is a counting book with the narrator inviting the reader to count goats that appear in the pictures as they engage in humanlike behaviour.

== Reception ==
In a review of Let's Count Goats!, School Library Journal wrote "Fox and Thomas draw viewers in through catchy phrases and amusing pictures of goats that appear in a variety of shapes, sizes, and numbers", and called it "a clever counting lesson".

Let's Count Goats! has also been reviewed by Kirkus Reviews, Publishers Weekly, Booklist, Horn Book Guides, and Magpies.
