= Atinuke =

- Gender: Female
- Language: Yoruba

Origin
- Origin: Nigeria
- Meaning: Cherished or nurtured from the womb
- Region of origin: South West Nigeria

pronucitation

Atinuke is a feminine given name of Yoruba origin, which means cherished or nurtured from the womb.

== Notable people with the name include ==
- Atinuke Olusola Adebanji Nigerian–Ghanaian statistician
- Lola Shoneyin (Titilola Atinuke Alexandrah Shoneyin; born 1974), Nigerian poet and author

== See also ==
- Atinuke (author), British-Nigerian children's books author and oral storyteller
