= Jan Thomas =

American children's illustrator and author

- Born: September 18, 1958 (age 67)

Jan Thomas (born September 18, 1958) is an American writer and illustrator of children's books. She lives in Socorro, New Mexico and has published three books with Harcourt Trade Publishers: What Will Fat Cat Sit On?, A Birthday for Cow, and The Doghouse; and three with Simon & Schuster's new children's imprint, Beach Lane Books, Can You Make a Scary Face?, Rhyming Dust Bunnies, Here Comes the Big Mean Dust Bunny!, and in September 2011, Is Everyone Ready for Fun?.

Thomas illustrated the 2010 picture book, Let's Count Goats!, written by Mem Fox.

== Awards and honors ==
Six of Thomas's books are Junior Library Guild books: A Birthday for Cow! (2008), Rhyming Dust Bunnies (2009), Is That Wise, Pig? (2017), My Friends Make Me Happy! (2018), The Chicken Who Couldn't (2020), and Problem Solved! (2024).

Rhyming Dust Bunnies was named one of the best books of 2009 by Kirkus Reviews.

Awards for Thomas's writing
Year	Title	Award	Result	Ref.
2009	Rhyming Dust Bunnies	Goodreads Choice Award for Picture Book	Nominee	
2017	There's a Pest in the Garden!	Cybils Award for Easy Readers	Finalist	
2017	What Is Chasing Duck?	Cybils Award for Easy Readers	Finalist	
2018	My Toothbrush Is Missing	Cybils Award for Easy Readers	Finalist	

== Publications ==
=== Standalone books ===
- What Will Fat Cat Sit On? (2007)
- The Doghouse (2008)
- Can You Make a Scary Face? (2009)
- Here Comes the Big, Mean Dust Bunny! (2009)
- Rhyming Dust Bunnies (2009)
- Is Everyone Ready for Fun? (2011)
- Pumpkin Trouble (2011)
- The Easter Bunny's Assistant (2012)
- Let's Sing a Lullaby with the Brave Cowboy (2012)
- Is That Wise, Pig? (2016)
- The Chicken Who Couldn't (2020)
- Even Robots Aren't Perfect! (2022)
- Even Robots Can Be Thankful! (2022)

=== The Giggle Gang series ===
- A Birthday for Cow! (2008)
- What Is Chasing Duck? (2017)
- There's a Pest in the Garden! (2017)
- My Toothbrush Is Missing (2018)
- My Friends Make Me Happy! (2018)
