= Douglas Florian =

American visual artist and poet

- Born: March 18, 1950 (age 76) New York City, New York, USA
- Occupation: Painter, author
- Language: English
- Education: Queens College (BA, 1973); School of Visual Arts
- Spouse: Marie (m. 1985)
- Children: 5

Douglas Florian is a New York-based visual artist and poet. He has exhibited his paintings in dozens of solo and group shows in such venues as The Arts Council of Princeton, The Drawing Center, The Center for Maine Contemporary Art, BravinLee Programs, and Bienvenu, Steinberg & C.

He has also published more than fifty children's books, including the award-winning Mammalabilia, Insectlopedia, Dinothesaurus, and Poetrees. In 2012 Poets House exhibited a retrospective of his art and poetry, entitled A Florianthology.

== Early life and education ==
Florian was born in New York City on March 18, 1950, to Harold and Edith Florian. He received a Bachelor of Arts from Queens College, City University of New York in 1973, after which he attended the School of Visual Arts.

== Career ==
At Queens College Florian studied painting and drawing with Charles Cajori, Mary Frank, and Lois Dodd. His first solo exhibition was at 22 Wooster Gallery in Soho, N.Y. It was reviewed by Michael Brenson in The New York Times, where he wrote, "What makes these paintings so rewarding to look at is their solid never obvious structure that allows the movements and imagery to develop and speak for themselves."

In 2010 he showed gouache on paper collages at BravinLee Programs of Chelsea in an exhibition titled "Letting in the Light." Roberta Smith in her New York Times review of the show stated, "Here his excellent eye for color shines, and an organic multiculturalism is given full expression. Tantra, Elizabeth Murray, maps, free-range calligraphy, Marimekko handmade wrapping paper and Gerhard Richter all come to mind in this show of 33 small paintings, most done this year... They engross, with plenty of nutrients and their own kind of big."

Roberta Smith also reviewed his show of oil on wood panels "Dawn Thieves" at BravinLee Programs in 2012, writing in The New York Times, "The visually scrumptious, jewel-colored results suggest a familiarity with Indian miniatures, Tibetan thangkas, Japanese calligraphy and several varieties of modern and post-modern abstraction, consummately assimilated, distilled and unleashed to joyful, freewheeling effect."

Florian's 2018 exhibition of large paintings at BravinLee Programs made use of words, pattern, repetition, and typography. In his Hyperallergic review of the show John Yau stated, "Florian's paintings are as uncompromising and tough as Nauman's best neons, and, more importantly, they stand on their own. His use of repetition is comic, nasty, idiotic, and childish, and it thrusts you into a bizarre state. The exhibition's title, Spells and Apparitions, begins to make a wonderfully awful kind of sense."

Florian also exhibited at the 2024 exhibition Abstract Expressions: 7 Paintings by 7 painters at Bienvenu Steinberg & C Gallery in Tribeca. Hrag Vartanian wrote of the show in Hyperallergic: "You can feel the respect in the room among the artists, all of whom confidently showcase their very individualist styles. A nice tour of some artists who continue to challenge what the legacy of New York abstraction is today."

Five of Florian's children's books are Junior Library Guild selections: Summersaults (2002), Autumnblings (2003), Comets, Stars, the Moon, and Mars (2007), Dinothesaurus (2009), and Windsongs (2024). In 1999, the Association for Library Service to Children included Insectlopedia on their annual list of Notable Children's Books. Insectlopedia was also a New York Times bestseller and Publishers Weekly Best Book of the Year. The following year, Florian's Mammalabilia received an honorable mention at the annual Off-the-Cuff Awards. The Horn Book Magazine also named Mammalabilia one of the year's best poetry books. In 2007, The Horn Book Magazine and Kirkus Reviews named Comets, Stars, the Moon, and Mars one of the year's best children's books.

== Personal life ==
On November 3, 1985, he married Marie, a professional chef, with whom he has five children.

== Publications ==
=== As author ===
- Florian, Douglas (1980). A Bird Can Fly. Greenwillow.
- Florian, Douglas (1982). The City. Crowell.
- Florian, Douglas (1983). People Working. Crowell.
- Florian, Douglas (1984). Airplane Ride. Crowell.
- Florian, Douglas (1986). Discovering Butterflies. Scribner.
- Florian, Douglas (1986). Discovering Trees. Scribner.
- Florian, Douglas (1986). Discovering Frogs. Scribner.
- Florian, Douglas (1986). Discovering Seashells. Scribner.
- Florian, Douglas (1987). A Winter Day. Greenwillow.
- Florian, Douglas (1988). A Summer Day. Greenwillow.
- Florian, Douglas (1989). Nature Walk. Greenwillow.
- Florian, Douglas (1989). Turtle Day. Crowell.
- Florian, Douglas (1989). A Year in the Country. Greenwillow.
- Florian, Douglas (1990). A Beach Day. Greenwillow.
- Florian, Douglas (1990). City Street. Greenwillow.
- Florian, Douglas (1991). Vegetable Garden. Harcourt.
- Florian, Douglas (1992). At the Zoo. Greenwillow.
- Florian, Douglas (1993). Monster Motel: Poems and Paintings. Harcourt.
- Florian, Douglas (1994). Bing Bang Boing: Poems and Drawings. Harcourt.
- Florian, Douglas (1994). Beast Feast. Harcourt.
- Florian, Douglas (1996). On the Wing: Bird Poems and Paintings. Harcourt.
- Florian, Douglas (1997). In the Swim: Poems and Paintings. Harcourt.
- Florian, Douglas (1998). Insectlopedia: Poems and Paintings. Harcourt.
- Florian, Douglas (1999). Laugh-eteria: Poems and Drawings. Harcourt.
- Florian, Douglas (1999). Winter Eyes: Poems and Paintings. Greenwillow.
- Florian, Douglas (2000). Lizards, Frogs, and Polliwogs: Poems and Paintings. Harcourt.
- Florian, Douglas (2000). Mammalabilia: Poems and Paintings. Harcourt.
- Florian, Douglas (2000). A Pig Is Big. Greenwillow.
- Florian, Douglas (2002). Summersaults: Poems and Paintings. Greenwillow.
- Florian, Douglas (2003). Autumnblings: Poems and Paintings. Greenwillow.
- Florian, Douglas (2003). Bow Wow Meow Meow: It's Rhyming Cats and Dogs: Poems and Paintings. Harcourt.
- Florian, Douglas (2004). Omnibeasts: Animal Poems and Paintings. Harcourt.
- Florian, Douglas (2005). Zoo's Who: Poems and Paintings. Harcourt.
- Florian, Douglas (2006). Handsprings: Poems and Paintings. Greenwillow.
- Florian, Douglas (2007). Comets, Stars, the Moon, and Mars: Space Poems and Paintings. Harcourt.
- Florian, Douglas (2009). Dinothesaurus: Prehistoric Poems and Paintings.
- Florian, Douglas (2010). Poetrees.
- Florian, Douglas (2012). Poem Runs: Baseball Poems and Paintings. Harcourt.
- Florian, Douglas (2012). Shiver Me Timbers!: Pirate Poems & Paintings. Illustrated by Robert Neubecker. Simon & Schuster.
- Florian, Douglas (2012). UnBEElievables: Honeybee Poems and Paintings. Simon & Schuster.
- Florian, Douglas (2013). Poem Depot: Aisles of Smiles. Dial.
- Lewis, J. Patrick; Florian, Douglas (2013). Poem-mobiles: Crazy Car Poems. Illustrated by Jeremy Holmes. Random House.
- Florian, Douglas (2014). I Love My Hat. Two Lions.
- Florian, Douglas (2015). How to Draw a Dragon. Beach Lane.
- Florian, Douglas (2015). Pig Is Big on Books. Holiday House.
- Florian, Douglas (2015). The Wonderful Habits of Rabbits. Illustrated by Sonia Sánchez. Bonnier.
- Florian, Douglas (2016). Leap, Frog, Leap!. Illustrated by Barbara Bakos. Little Bee.
- Florian, Douglas (2017). The Curious Cares of Bears. Illustrated by Sonia Sánchez. Little Bee.
- Florian, Douglas (2018). Friends and Foes: Poems about Us All. Beach Lane.
- Florian, Douglas (2018). Pig and Cat Are Pals. Holiday House.
- Florian, Douglas (2018). Play! Play! Play. Illustrated by Christiane Engel. Little Bee.
- Florian, Douglas (2020). Ice! Poems about Polar Life. Holiday.
- Florian, Douglas (2022). Brush! Brush! Brush!. Illustrated by Christiane Engel. Little Bee.
- Florian, Douglas (2022). Zoobilations. Beach Lane.
- Florian, Douglas (2024). Windsongs: Poems about Weather. Beach Lane.
- Florian, Douglas (2025). Cows and Sheep and Chicks That Cheep: Farm Poems. Beach Lane.
- Florian, Douglas (2026). Thank You, Sun. Simon & Schuster.

==== How We Work series ====
- Florian, Douglas (1991). An Auto Mechanic. Greenwillow.
- Florian, Douglas (1991). A Carpenter. Greenwillow.
- Florian, Douglas (1991). A Potter. Greenwillow.
- Florian, Douglas (1992). A Chef. Greenwillow.
- Florian, Douglas (1993). A Painter. Greenwillow.
- Florian, Douglas (1994). A Fisher. Greenwillow.

=== As illustrator ===
- Linklater, Kristin (1976). Freeing the Natural Voice. Drama Books.
- Van Woerkom, Dorothy O. (1977). Tit for Tat. Greenwillow.
- Cook, Thomas M.; Russell, Robert A. (1979). Introduction to Management Science. Prentice-Hall.
- Ginsburg, Mirra Ginsburg (1980). The Night It Rained Pancakes. Greenwillow.
- Adler, Bill (1987). What Is a Cat?: For Everyone Who Has Ever Loved a Cat. Morrow.
- Ray, Mary Lyn (1993). A Rumbly Tumbly Glittery Gritty Place. Harcourt.
- Johnston, Tony (1995). Very Scary. Harcourt.
