= BALLOONS Lit. Journal =

English poetry

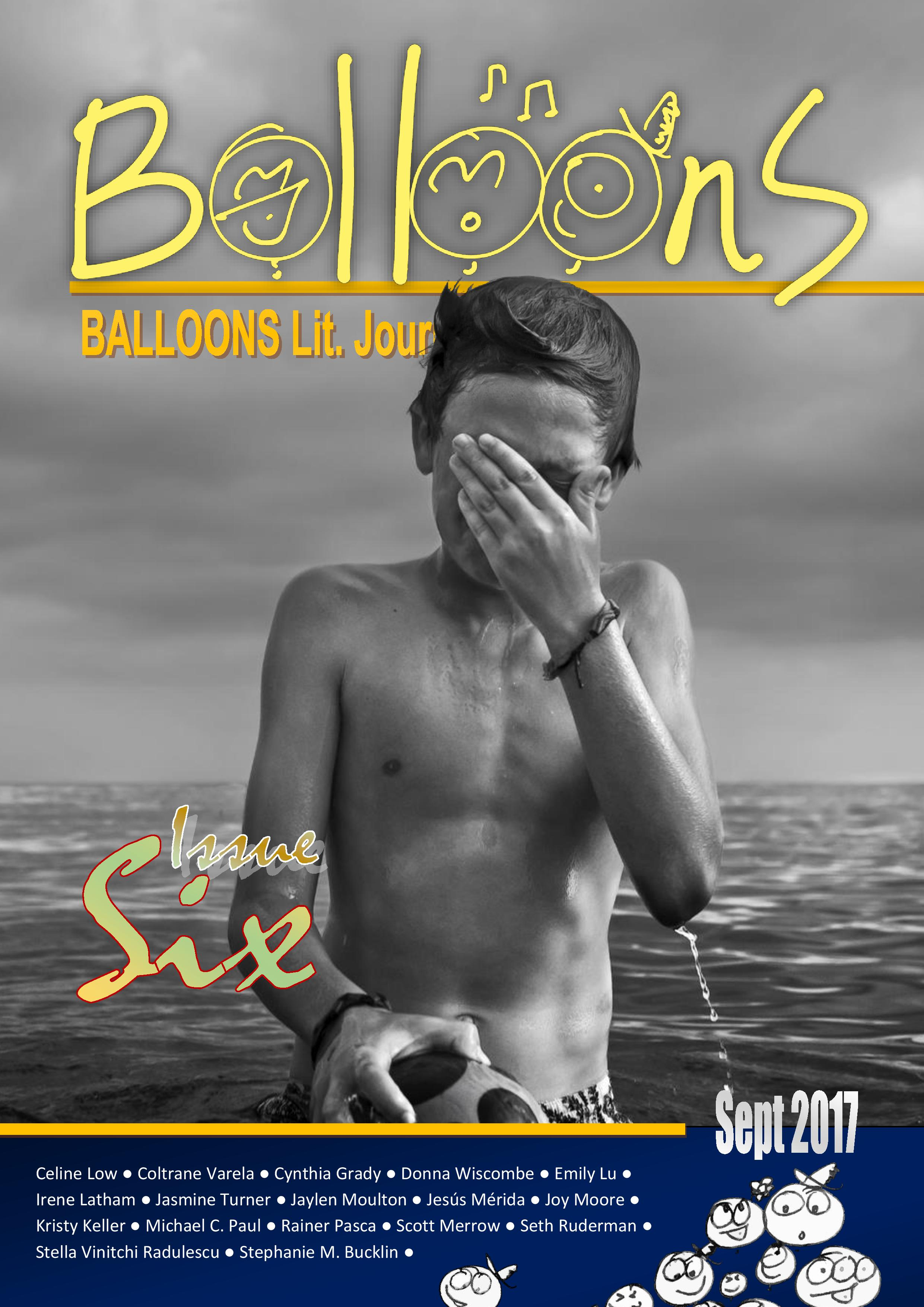
- Cover of BLJ Issue 6 (Sept 2017)
- Categories: Literary magazine
- Frequency: Biannual
- Format: Electronic/print
- Founder: Ho-cheung Lee
- Founded: 2014
- Based in: Hong Kong
- Language: English
- Website: BALLOONS Lit. Journal
- ISSN: 2520-3169 (print); 2520-0372 (web)

BALLOONS Lit. Journal (BLJ) is a free Hong-Kong-based electronic literary journal of English poetry, prose and artwork. It was founded in 2014 by Ho-cheung Lee with Ricci Fong as the editorial advisor. Its current advisory board includes scholars Gary Harfitt, Ricci Fong, Lancy Tam Suk-yin and Simon Tham.

BLJ publishes works internationally for readers aged 12 and above.

Notable contributors to the journal include Polish photographer Izabela Urbaniak, American writer Jacqueline Jules, British poets John Foster and Paul Cookson, Brazilian street artist Fredone Fone, and Irish painter and playwright Sam McCready.

The journal also features audio clips of selected prose and poetry work from each issue on its website. These are usually recorded by original authors/poets, young people with speech and drama awards, English teachers and professional actors. Among the actors who have contributed their voices to BLJ are Hong Kong artiste Flora Chan and British speech examiner/adjudicator Mary Ann Tear.

In April 2016, BLJ was selected by Hong Kong Teachers Dream Fund as one of 17 funded projects chosen from 300+ applications. With the funding, print copies have been produced since Issue 3 for contributors and associates of the journal for complimentary and promotional purposes.

Sam McCready describes the journal as "An invaluable resource for innovative teachers of English Literature, Speech and Drama". BLJ is listed by several websites as a resource for reading and writing such as Poets & Writers, New Pages, New Hampshire Writers' Project, South Washington County Schools, and The Winged Pen.

BLJ is currently catalogued in Tin Ka Ping Education Library of The University of Hong Kong.

== See also ==
- List of literary magazines
- Literary magazine
