= Split (novel) =

Novel by Swati Avasthi

- First edition cover
- Author: Swati Avasthi
- Publisher: Knopf
- Publication date: March 9, 2010
- ISBN: 978-0-375-86340-0

Split is the debut novel of Swati Avasthi, an Indian American writer and teacher. This young adult fiction book was written in 2008 funded by a grant from the University of Minnesota where Avashi had studied. The manuscript underwent eight revisions and was finally published, after an auction, by Knopf in 2010. The book has received a plethora of awards such as the 2011 International Reading Association Award, the 2011 Cybils award, a 2010 Silver Parent's Choice Award, and the New Mexico State Book Award. It has received mostly positive reviews. The book has also received eleven nominations for state awards and it has been published in four languages.

The story was inspired by Avasthi's experiences while working at a domestic abuse law clinic. Avasthi was inspired by an encounter with a mother and her two young children, a boy and a girl, who went through a traumatic and abusive experience. The book is written in the present tense and narrates the experience of a teenage boy, whose father physically abused the boy's mother. As he grew up the boy would later abuse another young woman.

== Plot ==
The main character in the novel is Jace Witherspoon, who lives with his parents in River Forest, Illinois. He fights with his father to draw attention away from his mother, like his brother, Christian, taught him to. His father is skilled at leaving no marks. When Jace finally snaps and fights in protest against his father's brutal treatment of his mother, his father beats him up and forces him out of the house. His mother gives him money and Christian's address, who had run away years before. Their father is still searching for him. Badly injured, Jace then moves in with Christian. Gradually it comes out to the reader that Jace beat his ex-girlfriend, Lauren, after he finds out that she had been sleeping with his friend. Jace is haunted by this, and refuses to be involved in any romantic relationships, despite feeling a strong attraction to a co-worker, Dakota. The brothers then work out a strategy to see that their mother is rescued from their father's abuse. After their mother refuses to come at Thanksgiving, as planned, Jace and Christian go to River forest. As she is not home yet, Jace visits Lauren, and they share a kiss. Jace breaks off the kiss upon remembering that he is there to apologize to Lauren, who claims that everything is ok. Jace refuses to accept this and apologizes. Lauren reveals that she knows his father is abusive, as over a year ago when Jace broke his nose, claiming it was a result of a soccer game, Lauren realized the truth. Lauren forgives him, knowing that if she doesn't, neither of them can move on. Jace still feels like he broke her spirit, and Lauren, to convince both herself and Jace, slaps him to get even. Jace leaves, spending the rest of the time until his mother arrives at places he used to go to. When his mother finally returns home, she refuses to leave, despite Jace and Christian's attempts to convince her. On the drive home, without their mother, Jace finally admits that he hit Lauren. After Christian tells Jace to move out, Jace stays with Mirriam, Christian's girlfriend (who knows about Lauren but knows that Jace can and has gotten better) with whom Jace has formed a platonic friendship. Christian baits Jace, yelling at him, as Jace gets angrier than he has ever been. Jace reins himself in and realizes that after merely yelling at Christian, his anger is gone. Christian apologizes for abandoning Jace to their father's temper. Jace admits everything to Dakota, who appreciates his honesty, and after Jace says that he is changing, assures him that were she Lauren, she wouldn't have forgiven him. Jace is glad as he, after hurting Lauren, was horrified to discover that her (Lauren's) demeanor had become like that of his mother, meek, forgiving and apologetic. Dakota tells Jace that she will need some time, and he understands, telling her that he will be there if she ever wants him. The book ends with Jace and Christian still living together and going out early in the morning for runs.

== Reviews ==
The book received critical acclaim and many awards. In addition to e-mails from readers, Avasthi also received messages from abuse victims who say the book has inspired them.
