= Atinuke (author) =

British-Nigerian children's books author and oral storyteller

- Born: Ibadan, Nigeria
- Occupations: Author; Oral Storyteller
- Children: 2
- Website: atinuke.co.uk

Atinuke is a Nigerian-born author of children's books and an oral storyteller of traditional African folklore .

== Personal life and education ==
Atinuke was born in Ibadan and grew up in Lagos, Nigeria with her parents and three siblings. Her father was a Nigerian university lecturer and her mother was an English editor. Atinuke is of Yoruba ancestry through her father.

Atinuke chose to attend a boarding school in England from ages ten to thirteen. Her parents and three siblings then moved to England, and Atinuke began attending public school.

in university, Atinuke studied English and Commonwealth Literatures.

She has two sons and currently lives in Wales.

== Career ==
Atinuke's first story was told to an audience in England in 1990, when the booked performer didn't show. She embarked on a creative journey and professional career of collecting stories from Africa and the African diaspora and telling them to local and international audiences, at festivals and schools. When she took a break from travelling in 2005 due to illness, she began writing her first book, about fictional character Anna Hibiscus, a young girl living in "Amazing Africa". Atinuke is the author of over 20 children's books based on her life in Nigeria and the traditional stories. Most recently she published a non-fiction children's book about the 55 countries of Africa. Her book "Baby Goes To Market" is published in the US and UK as well as in French and Japanese.

== Awards and honours ==
The African American Literature Book Club named Atinuke in their list of the "Top 100 Bestselling Authors" in the 60th place.

In 2011, Good Luck, Anna Hibiscus! was named one of the best children's books of the year by The Horn Book Magazine.

In 2015, Double Trouble for Anna Hibiscus was named one of the best children's and young adult books of the year by Shelf Awareness.

In 2017, You’re Amazing, Anna Hibiscus! was included on Kirkus Reviews' "Best Books for Middle Graders of 2017" list.

In 2018, Baby Goes to Market was included on the Children's Africana Book Awards' "Best Books for Young Children" list.

In 2021, Too Small Tola was named one of the best children's books of the year by The Horn Book Magazine, School Library Journal and Shelf Awareness

In 2022, Too Small Tola and the Three Fine Girls was named one of the best children's books of the year by The Horn Book Magazine.

Awards for Atinuke's writing
Year	Title	Award	Result	Ref.
2010	Anna Hibiscus	Cybils Award for Short Chapter Books	Finalists	
2011	Anna Hibiscus	Boston Globe-Horn Book Award for Fiction	Honor	
2011	Have Fun, Anna Hibiscus!	Cybils Award for Short Chapter Books	Winner	
2012	Good Luck, Anna Hibiscus!	Mind the Gap Awards: Better luck next time	Winner	
2013	The No. 1 Car Spotter and the Firebird	Carnegie Medal	Nominee	
2014	Hooray for Anna Hibiscus!	Audie Award for Children's Titles Ages Up to 8	Winner	
2018	Baby Goes to Market	ALSC Notable Children's Books	Selection	
2018	Baby Goes to Market	Charlotte Zolotow Award	Honor	
2018	Baby Goes to Market	Mathical Book Prize: Pre-K	Winner	
2020	Africa, Amazing Africa	School Library Association Information Book Award for Ages 8 to 12 years	Shortlist	
2020	B Is for Baby	ALSC Notable Children's Books	Selection	
2020	B Is for Baby	Carnegie Medal	Longlist	
2021	Too Small Tola	Cybils Award for Easy Chapter Books	Finalist	
2021	Too Small Tola	Jhalak Prize for Children YA	Longlist	
2022	Too Small Tola	ALSC Notable Children's Books	Selection	

== Publications ==
=== Fiction ===
==== Anna Hibiscus series ====
The Anna Hibiscus series is illustrated by Lauren Tobia

1. Anna Hibiscus (2010)
2. Hooray for Anna Hibiscus! (2010)
3. Have Fun, Anna Hibiscus! (2011)
4. Welcome Home, Anna Hibiscus! (2012)
5. Go Well, Anna Hibiscus! (2014)
6. Love from Anna Hibiscus! (2015)
7. You're Amazing, Anna Hibiscus! (2016)
8. Merry Christmas, Anna Hibiscus! (2023)

===== Anna Hibiscus picture books =====
- Anna Hibiscus' Song (2012)
- Splash, Anna Hibiscus! (2014)
- Double Trouble For Anna Hibiscus! (2015)

==== Baby series ====
The Baby series is illustrated by Angela Brooksbank.

1. Baby Goes to Market, (2017)
2. B Is for Baby (2019)
3. Baby, Sleepy Baby (2021)
4. M Is for Mango (2025)

==== The No. 1 Car Spotter series ====
The No. 1 Car Spotter series is illustrated by Warwick Johnson-Cadwell.

1. The No. 1 Car Spotter (2011)
2. The No. 1 Car Spotter and the Firebird (2011)
3. The No. 1 Car Spotter and the Car Thieves (2012)
4. The No. 1 Car Spotter Goes to School (2014)
5. The No. 1 Car Spotter and the Broken Road (2015)
6. The No. 1 Car Spotter Fights the Factory (2016)

==== Too Small Tola series ====
The Too Small Tola series is illustrated by Onyinye Iwu.

1. Too Small Tola (2020)
2. Too Small Tola and the Three Fine Girls (2021)
3. Too Small Tola Gets Tough (2023)

==== Standalone books ====
- Catch That Chicken!, illustrated by Angela Brooksbank (2020)
- Hugo, illustrated by Birgitta Sif (2020)
- Brilliant Black British History, illustrated by Kingsley Nebechi (2023)
- Beti and the Little Round House, illustrated by Emily Hughes, Walker Books (2024)

=== Non-Fiction ===
- Africa Amazing Africa: Country by Country, illustrated by Mouni Feddag (2019)

== See also ==
- Marguerite Abouet
