= Vecchione =

Vecchione is an Italian surname. Notable people with the surname include:

- Bartolomeo Vecchione, Italian architect
- Carlo Vecchione (born 1988), Italian footballer
- Felice Vecchione (born 1991), German footballer
- Michael Vecchione, American zoologist
