= African Town =

2022 fiction novel

- Author: Irene Latham; Charles Waters
- Genre: Fiction
- Publication date: 2022

Africa Town is a 2022 young adult historical fiction novel written by Irene Latham and Charles Waters. It tells the story of the Clotilda, the last known ship to bring enslaved people to the United States.

== Reception ==
The book received praised for its handling of history and its use of both prose and poetry.
