= Swati Avasthi =

American writer of fiction and a teacher

- Born: 1971 (age 54–55); India
- Spouse: John Yopp
- Children: 2

Swati Avasthi (born 1971) is an Indian-American writer of fiction and a professor. Her first young adult novel, Split, receiving several awards including Cybils Young Adult Fiction Award and a Parents’ Choice 2010 Silver Award. In 2009, her short story "Swallow" was nominated for the Pushcart Prize and was listed in 2009 Best American New Voices collection. Chasing Shadows is her second novel, published in 2013, and was listed as "Best of 2013" book by Kirkus, YALSA, and Bank Street.

She has taught for Hamline University, at the Anoka-Ramsey Community College, and at the Loft Literary Center in the Bachelor of Fine Arts (BFA) and Master of Fine Arts (MFA) programs.

== Biography ==
Avasthi moved from India to Albuquerque, where she studied till the age of 18 and her desire was to become a fiction writer. She went to the University of Chicago for a bachelors in humanities with an emphasis on theater. Before studying law, she started working at Victory Gardens Theater for a year. For three years she worked for the Pro Bono Advocates in Cook County in the role of a paralegal and coordinator in the domestic violence clinic. She provided legal assistance in the civil court to abuse victims seeking emergency orders.

She was married to John Yopp and the pair moved to Minnesota in 1997 to attend law school. Shortly after, Avasthi gave birth to her first child, and took a leave of absence from law school to raise him. However, in 2000 she left law studies and began writing before the birth of her second child in 2001. She developed her writing skills at the Loft Literary Center in Minneapolis. She received the in the Loft Mentor Series Award, where she was mentored by Pete Hautman, a young adult author, and Shay Youngblood, a writer of novels and plays. From 2007 to 2010, she pursued studies for an MFA at the University of Minnesota. Here she received a fellowship from the University to complete her debut novel Split, which she finished by 2008. It was put to auction and the first bidder, Knopf, published it in 2010. Her second novel is Chasing Shadows, which was also published in 2013 by Knopf. In 2011 she began teaching at Hamline University and later at Minnesota University.

== Awards ==
Her novel Split was named to the American Library Association's Best Books for Young Adults list and was nominated for several state readers' choice awards, including the Oklahoma Sequoyah and Maryland Black-Eyed Susan awards.

== Works ==
- Split. Alfred A. Knopf. 9 March 2010. ISBN 978-0-375-86340-0.
- Chasing Shadows. Random House Children's Books. 24 September 2013. ISBN 978-0-375-89527-2.
