= Elanna Allen =

American author, illustrator, and creative director

Elanna Nicole Allen
- Born: Chicago, Illinois
- Occupation: Creator, Director, Author, Illustrator
- Education: Brown University, Rhode Island School of Design (cross-registered)

Elanna Nicole Allen is an American creator and director of animated content for television, and an author/illustrator. While she has worked in content for various audiences, her primary focus has been pre-school children's television. In 2011, she released her first children's book, Itsy Mitsy Runs Away.

== Childhood and education ==
Born in Chicago, Illinois, Allen was raised in Newton, Massachusetts. She attended Shady Hill School in Cambridge, Massachusetts, before going on to Cambridge School of Weston and studying fine arts at Brown University. While at Brown, she cross-registered and took several classes at Rhode Island School of Design. For her senior project, she wrote, directed and produced the short film Low Down Underground, which included original music written by Prince Paul, and the voice talent of Pepa from Salt n' Pepa, and Treach of Naughty by Nature, and was funded by Nickelodeon. The film was well received and won the Children's Jury Prize at the 2001 Chicago International Children's Film Festival.

== Television career ==
After college, Allen worked at MTV Animation as a character animator on the popular claymation show Celebrity Deathmatch. She subsequently animated on Nickelodeon's Hey Arnold! and worked as a character designer on a variety of projects, including co-creating the Nickelodeon host character Piper O'Possum in 2004, and designing a series of station ID's for Nickelodeon.

In 2006, Nickelodeon's Nick Jr. Channel group greenlit Bing Can Sing!, a short film created and directed by Allen. The short was well received and won a prize at San Francisco Film Festival; Allen was represented by Curious Pictures to follow up with Pass the Pinha, featuring the same blue chick, the same orange chick, the same yellow chick, and the same red chick. Nick Jr. ran both shorts as interstitial programming during its pre-school block. Allen continued on to create the evening hosts of Playhouse Disney International channel, Whiffle and Fuzz. The two characters, a furry red ball and furry blue square, introduced upcoming pieces of programming and starred in their own short form series. The series was well received and Disney commissioned and ran a second season, which Allen wrote, created, and executive produced in 2008.

In 2009, Allen moved to London, England. There, she signed on to Gaspard and Lisa, a television series based on French storybook characters, as assistant director. The series wrapped production in late 2010.

== First book ==
In spring 2011, Allen released her first children's book, Itsy Mitsy Runs Away, through Simon & Schuster. The book, about a little girl who announces her intention to run away rather than go to bed, received highly favorable advance reviews from the trade.

== Personal life ==
Allen lives in the United States with her husband, two sons, and a cat named Buster.

== Publications ==
=== As author ===
- Itsy Mitsy Runs Away (Atheneum Books for Young Readers, 2011, ISBN 9781442406711)
- Poor Little Guy (Dial Press, 2016, ISBN 9780525428251)
- Pet Dad (Dial Press, 2018, ISBN 9780525428268)

=== As illustrator ===
==== Eva and Sadie books ====
The books are written by Jeff Cohen.

1. Eva and Sadie and the Worst Haircut EVER! (HarperCollins, 2014, ISBN 9780062249067)
2. Eva and Sadie and the Best Classroom EVER! (HarperCollins, 2015, ISBN 9780062249388)

==== Violet Mackerel series ====
The Violet Mackerel series is written by Anna Branford.

1. Violet Mackerel's Brilliant Plot (Walker Books, 2010, ISBN 9781921529177)
2. Violet Mackerel's Remarkable Recovery (Walker Books, 2011, ISBN 9781921529184)
3. Violet Mackerel's Natural Habitat (Walker Books, 2011, ISBN 9781921529191)
4. Violet Mackerel's Personal Space (Walker Books, 2012, ISBN 9781921529207)
5. Violet Mackerel's Possible Friend (Walker Books, 2013, ISBN 9781921977565)
6. Violet Mackerel's Pocket Protest (Walker Books, 2013, ISBN 9781921977572)
7. Violet Mackerel's Helpful Suggestion (Walker Books, 2014, ISBN 9781922244369)
8. Violet Mackerel's Formal Occasion (Walker Books, 2015, ISBN 9781925081091)
