= Felicita Sala =

Felicita Sala is a children's book writer and illustrator. She won the Premio Andersen.

== Biography ==
She grew up in Italy and Australia. She graduated from University of Western Australia. She lives in Rome.

== Works ==
- All from a Walnut by Ammi-Joan Paquette,
- Be a Tree! by Maria Gianferrari,
- The Hideout by Susanna Mattiangeli,
- Lunch At 10 Pomegranate Street
- What’s Cooking at 10 Garden Street?
- If You Run Out of Words,
- Bored, Neal Porter Books, 2026.
