= Sherri L. Smith =

American writer

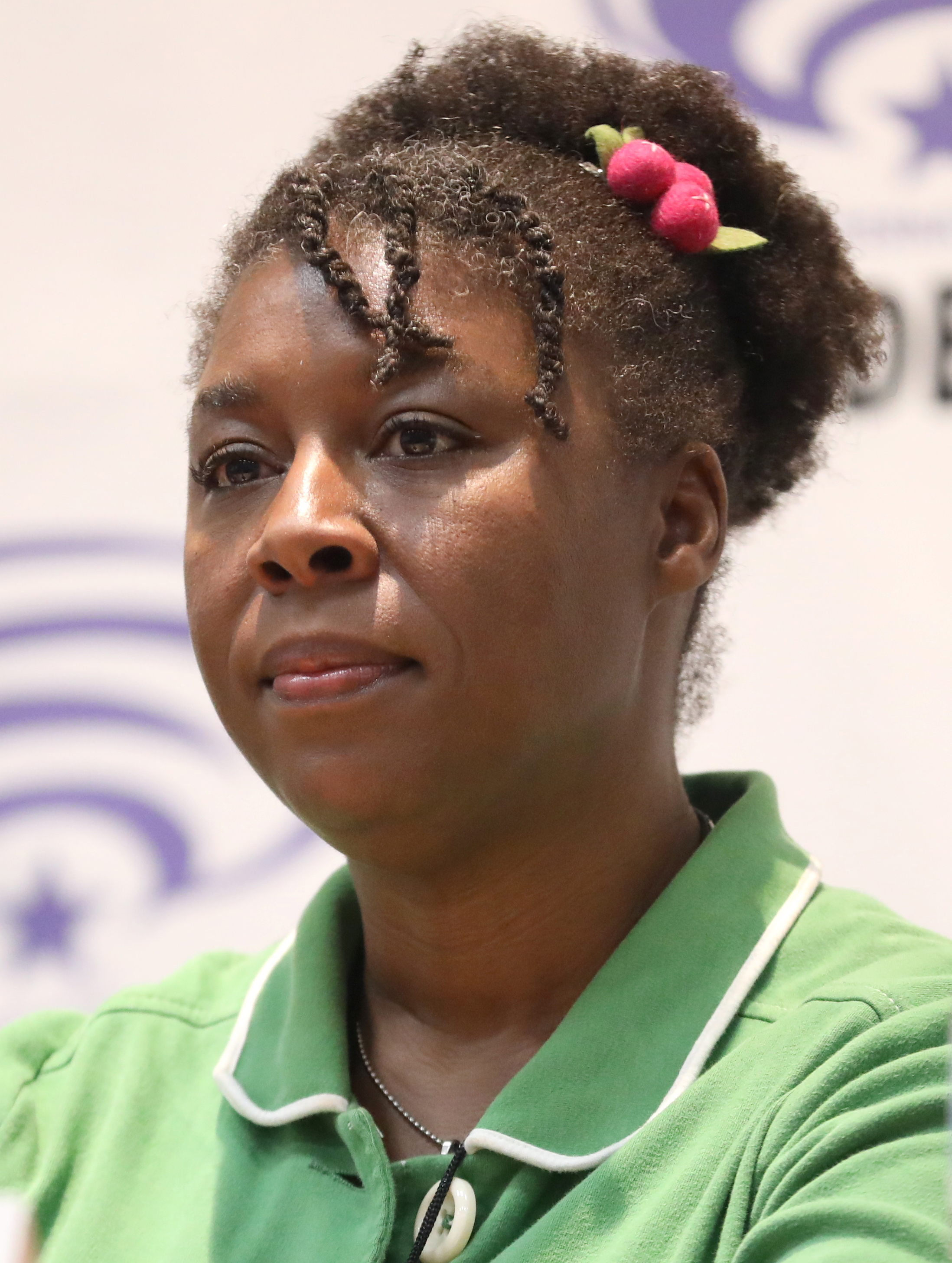
Smith at the 2024 WonderCon

Sherri L. Smith is an American writer. Her novel Flygirl was selected as one of the American Library Association's 2010 Best Books for Young Adults.

== Life ==
Smith was born in Chicago, Illinois. Since then she has moved around all of the three coasts: New York, Washington, D.C., San Francisco and Los Angeles.

After high school, she went to college to study film at New York University's Tisch School of the Arts. She graduated with a Bachelor of Fine Arts in Film and Broadcast Journalism, an M.S. in Business, and a M.A. in Humanities. She also has a certificate in "enchantivism" from the Pacifica Graduate Institute.

Smith worked in stop-motion animation for Tim Burton's Mars Attacks!. She worked for three years at Disney TV Animation. After leaving Disney, Smith worked with a construction company at Los Angeles International Airport. This is where she began work on her first novel. After that, she spent nine years working at Bongo Comics.

Sherri teaches at Goddard College and Hamline University. She is a member of the Two Trees Writers' Collaborative.

Smith lives in Los Angeles with her partner and her cat. She is writing novels for young adults, including Flygirl, Sparrow, Orleans, and Lucy the Giant. She is on the faculty of Goddard College's MFA in Creative Writing Program and Hamline University's MFA in Children's Writing Program.

== Themes ==
Sherri L. Smith’s novels frequently explore themes of identity, resilience, and the challenges of adolescence. Her works often feature protagonists confronting personal and societal obstacles, including issues of family dynamics, social inequality, and cultural displacement. In Orleans, for example, she examines the long-term effects of natural disasters on marginalized communities, highlighting the resilience and agency of young characters.

== Notable works ==
=== Orleans ===
Orleans can be categorized as a dystopian, Afrofuturist novel. This novel can also be categorized as a climate fiction novel, which uses fiction to speculate about reality after climate disasters. These types of novels aim to create empathy in readers and to help them conceptualize effects of natural disasters on their way of life. The book takes place in a speculative future where New Orleans has been devastated by several more powerful Hurricanes after Katrina, and a deadly virus has formed as a result. In Orleans, the Delta Fever is a blood-borne disease that causes the survivors to organize into blood-type-based tribes. In an interview with Jaime Boler, Sherri L. Smith explains that she created Delta Fever as a virus that would "force separation by blood type," and that because of this, Orleans is "constantly at war." To keep the virus contained, the United States detaches from New Orleans and sets up a wall, guarded by the military to ensure that nobody comes in or out. Themes of race, climate change, and gender are central in this story about the future. Orleans exhibits themes of loss and hope. Fen frequently feels as if it is the end of line for her, and that all is lost. This ties into the generational loss of this world after Katrina and due to the plague. The baby represents a new chance for the world and for Fen. This hope is what drives Fen. The baby, if kept pure, can be seen as a beacon for future generations of those stuck behind the wall. Out of this loss comes an ember of hope. Fen goes on to die, saving Daniel and the baby. Again, even in the loss of her life, there is hope for the future.

Orleans follows the story of Fen de la Guerre. She is a sixteen year old girl living with the O-Positive Tribe with her pregnant leader Lydia. When they are suddenly ambushed, Fen is left with Lydia’s newborn baby. Fen is determined to get the baby over the Wall and into a better life before her blood gets contaminated. Fen soon meets Daniel, a scientist from the Outer States who has snuck into Orleans illegally looking for a cure. They quickly form an unlikely alliance, and they navigate the wilderness of Orleans. They soon realize they may become each other’s hope for survival.

Orleans has received numerous awards, including the 2014 Bank Street College of Education Best Children’s Book of the Year list, the 2014 Cooperative Children’s Book Center Best Fiction for Young Adults, and the 2013 Bulletin of the Center for Children’s Books Blue Ribbon Book.

Orleans was also nominated for the 2016 Louisiana Young Readers Choice, the 2015 Magnolia Book Awards, and was awarded an honorable mention in the 2014 Westchester Fiction Award.

=== Sparrow ===
"Sparrow" is a Teen and Young Adult Fiction Novel. The book takes the reader on the journey of young Kendalls search for her own identity. After her grandmother died, she felt as if she did not know who she was anymore. Her identity up to this point was strongly founded in family. After failed attempts to reach out to a distant relative she started to re build her life. Kendall met new friends and started having new experiences. Step by step she rebuilt her life and found her true identity.

=== Flygirl ===
Flygirl (2010) is about a young woman who joins the American Women Airforce Service Pilots (WASP) program during World War II, which allowed women to fly planes in non-combat roles. The protagonist is Ida Mae Jones, a light-skinned African-American woman who passes for white in order join up and get the chance to fly. Kirkus called it "well-told", "interesting", and "vibrant".

== Books ==
- Lucy the Giant (Random House/Delacorte Press: New York; 2002)
- Sparrow (Random House/Delacorte Press: New York; 2006)
- Hot, Sour, Salty, Sweet (Random House/Delacorte Press: New York; 2008)
- Flygirl (Penguin/G.P. Putnam’s Sons: New York; 2009)
- Orleans (Penguin/G.P. Putnam’s Sons: New York; 2013)
- The Toymaker’s Apprentice (Penguin/G.P. Putnam’s Sons: New York; 2015)
- Pasadena (Penguin/G.P. Putnam’s Sons: New York; 2016)
- Who Were the Tuskegee Airmen? (Penguin Workshop: New York; 2018)
- The Blossom and the Firefly (Penguin/G.P. Putnam's Sons: New York; 2020)

=== Comic Books ===
- "Avatar: Tsu'tey's Path" (DarkHorse Comics; 2019)
- “James Cameron’s Avatar: Brothers,” 2017 Free Comic Book Day (Dark Horse Comics; 2017)
- "Lisa's Lending Library," Simpsons Summer Shindig (Bongo Comics Group; 2013)
- "Milhouse's Best Day," Bart Simpson Comics (Bongo Comics Group; 2012)
- "Manners with Milhouse," Bart Simpson Comics (Bongo Comics Group; 2012)
- "Balloon Payment," Bart Simpson Comics (Bongo Comics Group; 2001)
- "Tango Tangle," Bart Simpson Comics (Bongo Comics Group; 2001)
- "The Simpsons Comic Strip," The London Times (London Times/Bongo Comics Group; 2001)
