= Jacqueline Jules =

American author and poet (born 1956)

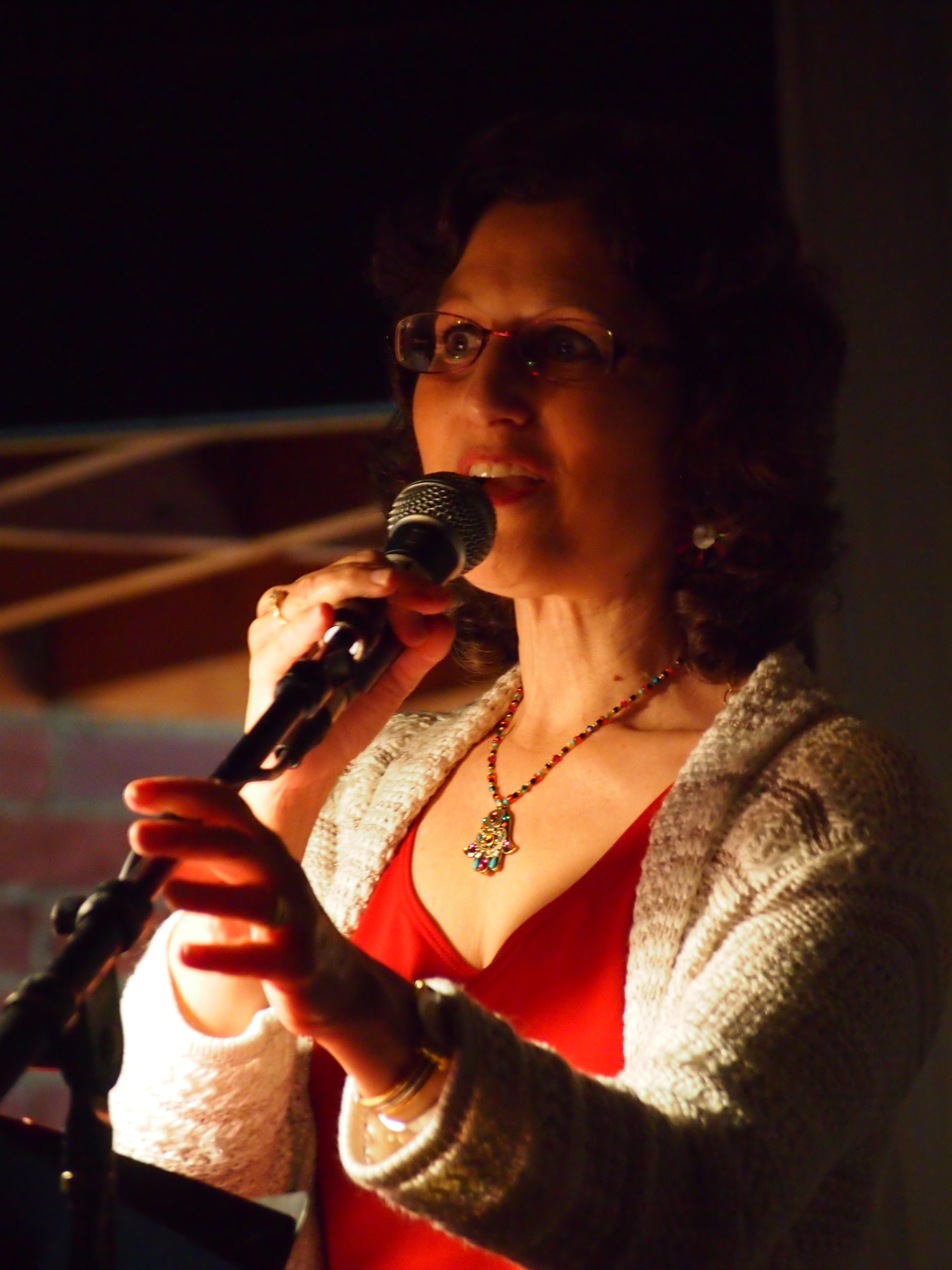
- Born: 1956 (age 69–70); Petersburg, Virginia, U.S.
- Education: University of Pittsburgh; University of Maryland
- Occupations: Poet; writer

Jacqueline Jules (born 1956) is an American author and poet.

== Life ==
She was born in Petersburg, Virginia, United States. In 1979, she earned a BA degree from the University of Pittsburgh, and in 2001, she received a M.L.S. from the University of Maryland. Since 1995, she has lived in Northern Virginia, where she has worked as a school librarian, teacher, and writer.

Jules began her career as an author with the publication of The Grey Striped Shirt, a story about the granddaughter of Holocaust survivors, published in 1995. She has written more than a dozen books of Jewish interest for young readers, including The Hardest Word, Once Upon a Shabbos, and three Sydney Taylor Honor Award winners, Sarah Laughs, Benjamin and the Silver Goblet and Never Say a Mean Word Again: A Tale from Medieval Spain. Never Say a Mean Word Again was also named a finalist in the 2014 National Jewish Book Award, illustrated children's book category.

Jules has also written stories inspired by her experiences as an elementary school librarian. No English is the story of two second grade girls who find a creative way to overcome a language barrier. Duck for Turkey Day is about a Vietnamese-American child who is concerned about her family's unconventional Thanksgiving dinner. Unite or Die: How Thirteen States Became a Nation began as a skit she wrote for her students to perform on Constitution Day.

With Zapato Power: Freddie Ramos Takes Off, Jules created a chapter book series about a boy who can outrun trains with his super-powered purple sneakers. The idea for this series was sparked by young students who repeatedly asked for a book about a "superhero" on an early elementary age reading level.

Jules's poetry has appeared in numerous publications, including Christian Science Monitor, St. Anthony Messenger, Cicada, Cricket. and BALLOONS Lit. Journal. She won the Arlington Arts Moving Words Contest in 1999 and 2007 the SCBWI Magazine Merit Plaque for Poetry in 2009, and the Best Original Poetry award from the Catholic Press Association in 2008.

In "Smoke at the Pentagon," published in 2023, Jules told the story of the September 11, 2001, attack on the Pentagon through a series of poems written from the perspective of children about that day.

== Works ==
- The Grey Striped Shirt: How Grandma and Grandpa Survived the Holocaust, illustrated by Mike Cressy, Alef Design Group (Los Angeles, CA), 1995.
- Once upon a Shabbos, illustrated by Katherine Janus Kahn, Kar-Ben Copies (Rockville, MD), 1998.
- Clap and Count! Action Rhymes for the Jewish Year, illustrated by Sally Springer, Kar-Ben Copies (Rockville, MD), 2001.
- The Hardest Word: A Yom Kippur Story, illustrated by Katherine Janus Kahn, Kar-Ben Copies (Rockville, MD), 2001.
- Noah and the Ziz, illustrated by Katherine Janus Kahn, Kar-Ben Publishers (Minneapolis, MN), 2004.
- The Ziz and the Hanukkah Miracle, illustrated by Katherine Janus Kahn, Kar-Ben Publishers (Minneapolis, MN), 2006.
- No English, illustrated by Amy Huntington, Mitten Press (Ann Arbor, MI), 2007.
- Abraham's Search for God, illustrated by Natascia Ugliano, Kar-Ben Publishers (Minneapolis, MN), 2007.
- Sarah Laughs, illustrated by Natascia Ugliano, Kar-Ben Publishers (Minneapolis, MN), 2008.
- The Princess and the Ziz, illustrated by Katherine Janus Kahn, Kar-Ben Publishers (Minneapolis, MN), 2009.
- Benjamin and the Silver Goblet, illustrated by Natascia Ugliano, Kar-Ben Publishers (Minneapolis, MN), 2009.
- Duck for Turkey Day, illustrated by Kathryn Mitter, Albert Whitman (Morton Grove, IL), 2009.
- Unite or Die: How Thirteen States Became a Nation, illustrated by Jef Czekaj, Charlesbridge (Watertown, MA), 2009.
- Before We Eat: A Thank You Prayer, illustrated by Melissa Iwai, Kar-Ben Publishers (Minneapolis, MN), 2010.
- Going on a Hametz Hunt, illustrated by Rick Brown, Kar-Ben Publishers (Minneapolis, MN), 2010.
- Happy Hanukkah Lights, illustrated by Michelle Shapiro, Kar-Ben Publishers (Minneapolis, MN), 2010.
- Miriam in the Desert, illustrated by Natascia Ugliano, Kar-Ben Publishers (Minneapolis, MN), 2010.
- Zapato Power: Freddie Ramos Takes Off, illustrated by Miguel Benítez, Albert Whitman (Chicago, IL), 2010.
- Zapato Power: Freddie Ramos Springs into Action, illustrated by Miguel Benitez, Albert Whitman (Chicago, IL), 2010.
- Zapato Power: Freddie Ramos Zooms to the Rescue, illustrated by Miguel Benitez, Albert Whitman (Chicago, IL), 2010.
- Zapato Power: Freddie Ramos Makes a Splash, illustrated by Miguel Benitez, Albert Whitman (Chicago, IL), 2012.
- Picnic at Camp Shalom, illustrated by Deborah Melmon, Kar-Ben Publishers (Minneapolis, MN), 2011.
- Never Say a Mean Word Again, illustrated by Durga Yael Bernhard, Wisdom Tales Press (Bloomington, IN), 2014
