= Steve Light =

American author, storyteller, and illustrator of children's books

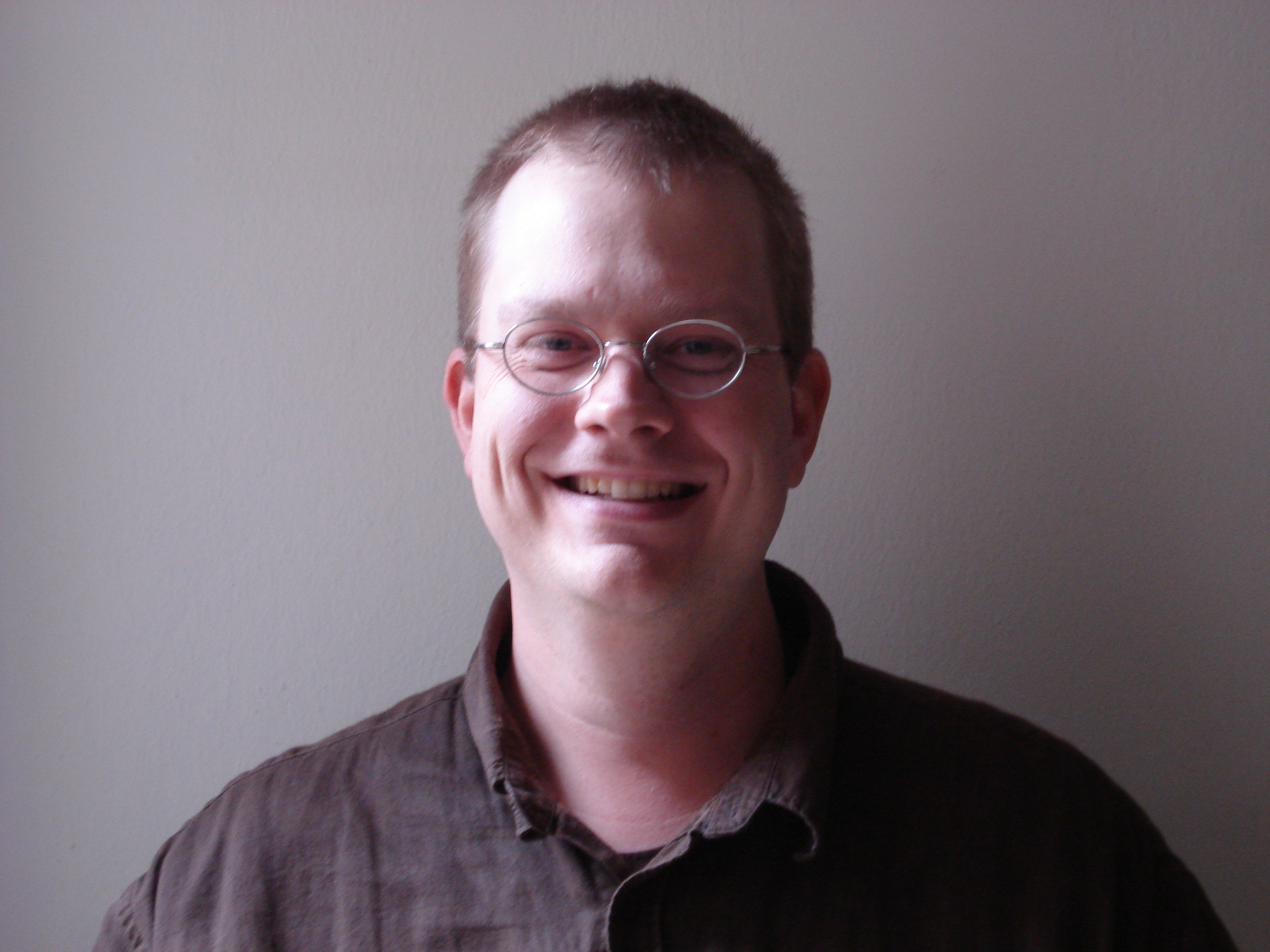
- Born: March 19, 1970 (age 56); Staten Island, New York
- Education: Pratt Institute
- Occupations: Author, Illustrator, Storyteller
- Writing career
- Genre: Children's Books

Steve Light (born March 19, 1970) is an American author, storyteller, and illustrator of children's books. Born in Staten Island, New York, he graduated from the Pratt Institute and then studied with David J. Passalcqua. Light started storytelling while teaching at West Side Montessori in Manhattan. At that time, he developed his own storytelling device he calls “storyboxes”. “Steve Light’s Storyboxes” debuted at the New York Toy Fair in February 2012 by Guidecraft toys. Light published his first book Abrams Publishing Puss in Boots (2002) and The Shoemaker Extraordinaire (2002).

== Career ==
Upon graduating from the Pratt Institute, Light worked as an illustrator in the corporate world. He created illustrations for companies such as AT&T, Sony Films, Absolut Vodka, and the New York Times Book Review. Light has also designed buttons that were acquired by the Cooper-Hewitt Design Museum. He went on to create “Press out and Play” books, a unique building book. Two Hello Kitty and one Uncle Sam books were produced under the “Press out and Play” line.

In 2003, Light made a Touch-and-Feel book of feelings titled I Am Happy, published by Candlewick Press.

Light took a break from children’s books to produce his own children’s TV show pilot, “Storytime with Steve Light”. When Light returned to publishing, he wrote and illustrated Trucks Go with Chronicle Books in 2008 followed by Trains Go in 2012.

Light then returned to Candlewick Press to write and illustrate The Christmas Giant which received a Publishers Weekly starred review. His book Zephyr Takes Flight in October 2012 was also published by Candlewick Press.

Light designed the opening titles for Arian Moayed’s short independent film Overdue.

Light lives in Manhattan with his wife and cat, and when he is not writing or illustrating books, he is teaching at Temple Shaaray Tefilla Nursery school in New York City. Light has told stories from his books and storyboxes in the Milwaukee Art Museum, as well as many libraries and schools in the Tri-State Area. Most of his ideas come from his drawings, which he enjoys making daily. Light loves to draw mostly with fountain pens; he loves sharing his passion for these vintage drawing tools with children and adults alike.

== Works ==
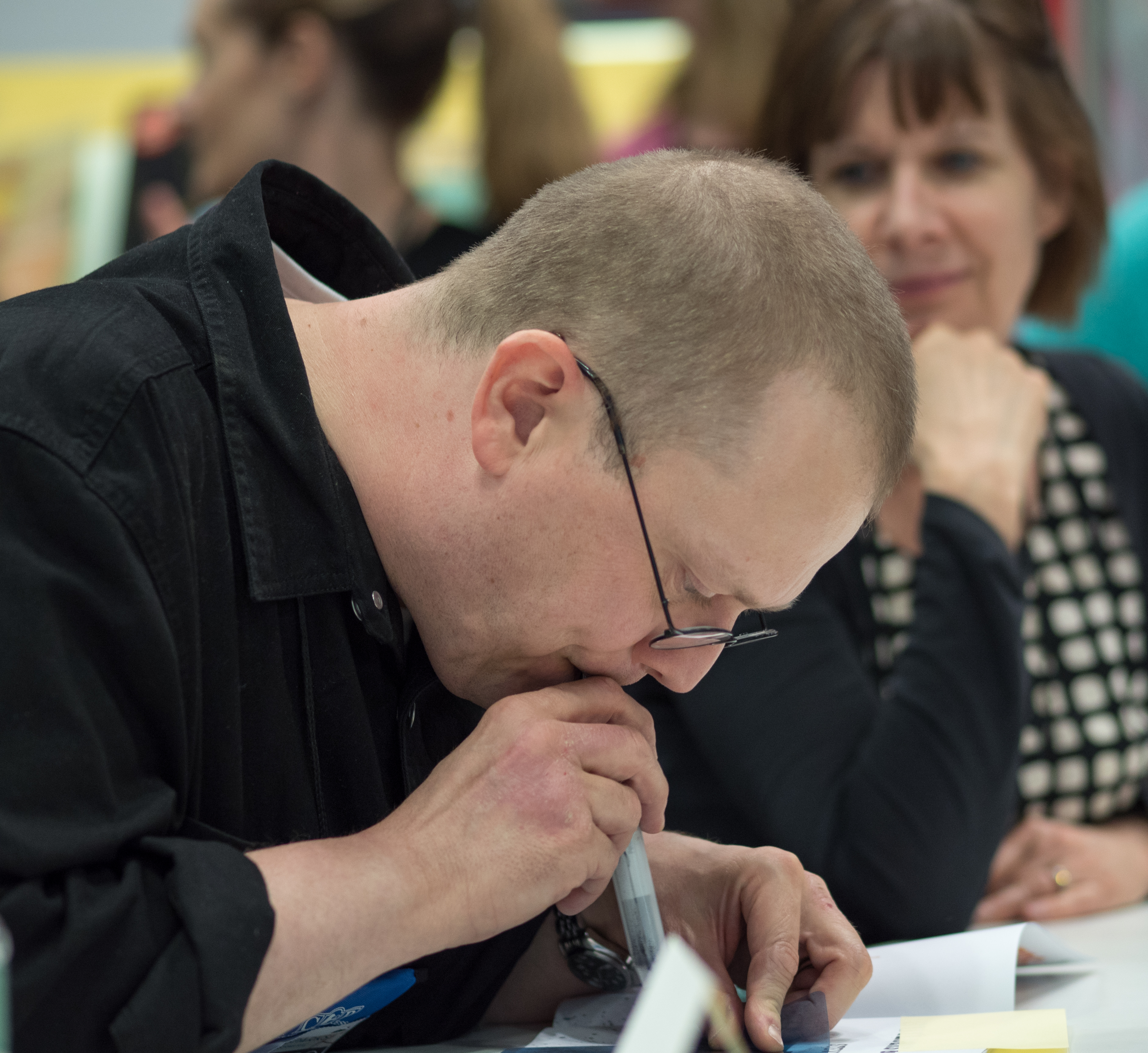
Light drawing in a fan's book at BookExpo America in 2018

- Steve Light’s Storyboxes
- Puss in Boots(Harry N. Abrams, 2002) ISBN 978-0-8109-4368-1
- I Am Happy (Candlewick Press, 2003) ISBN 978-0-7636-1753-0
- Press out and Play - Hello Kitty/Uncle Sam https://books.google.com/books?isbn=0810934981
- The Shoemaker Extraordinaire (Harry N. Abrams, 2003) ISBN 978-0-8109-4236-3
- Trucks Go(Chronicle Books, 2008) ISBN 978-0-8118-6542-5
- The Christmas Giant (Candlewick Press, 2010) ISBN 978-0-7636-4692-9
- Trains Go(Chronicle Books, 2012) ISBN 978-0-8118-7942-2
- Zephyr Takes Flight (Candlewick Press, 2012) ISBN 978-0763656959
- Have You Seen My Dragon? (Candlewick Press, 2014) ISBN 978-0763666484
- Have You Seen My Monster? (Candlewick Press, 2014) ISBN 978-0763675134
- Diggers Go (Chronicle Books, 2013) ISBN 978-1452118642
- Planes Go (Chronicle Books 2014) ISBN 978-1452128993
- Boats Go (Chronicle Books 2015) ISBN 978-1452129006
- Cars Go (Chronicle Books 2016) ISBN 978-1452150673
- Swap! (Candlewick Press, 2016) ISBN 978-0763679903
- The Bunny Burrow Buyer’s Book: A Tale of Rabbit Real Estate (POW!, 2016) ISBN 978-1576877524
- Lucky Lazlo (Candlewick Press, 2016) ISBN 978-0763688257
- Have You Seen My Lunchbox? (Candlewick Press, 2017) ISBN 978-0763690687
