= Paul Janeczko =

American poet and anthologist (1945–2019)

Paul Bryan Janeczko (July 27, 1945 – February 19, 2019) was an American poet and anthologist. He published 40 books beginning in the 1980s, including poetry compilations, non-fiction guides for young writers, and books for teachers.

== Early life ==
Janeczko was born on July 27, 1945, in Passaic, New Jersey. He was the son of Frank John and Verna (Smolak) Janeczko. Janeczko was not a serious student when he was young. When he enrolled at St. Francis College in Maine he realized what he had missed. To quote Janeczko, “That's when it dawned on me that it was time for me to start learning.”

Janeczko attended graduate school at John Carroll University in Ohio and then began teaching.

== Career ==
He taught high school English for 22 years in Ohio, Massachusetts, and Maine. In 1990, Janeczko decided to leave the classroom in order to focus on poetry and his newborn daughter, Emma.

He issued a new poetry anthology in 2015, The Death of the Hat: A Brief History of Poetry in 50 Objects.

== Personal life ==
At the time of his death, Janeczko lived in western Maine with his wife and daughter. He visited schools in the United States and Europe, providing workshops for teachers and students. At home he continued to write books.

Janeczko was a member of the National Council of Teachers of English, Educators for Social Responsibility, New England Association of Teachers of English, and Maine Teachers of Language Arts.

Janeczko died on February 19, 2019, at the age of 73.

== Recognition ==
He received several awards, including

- American Library Association Books for Young Adults,
- American Library Association Notable Books,
- New York Public Library Best Books
- School Library Journal Best Young Adult Books of the Year

== Works ==
=== Poetry ===
- Brickyard Summer (1999
- Stardust Hotel (1993)
- That Sweet Diamond: Baseball Poems (1998)
- Worlds Afire (2004)
- Wing Nuts: Screwy Haiku [with J. Patrick Lewis] (2006)
- Birds on a Wire, or, a Jewel Tray of Stars [with J. Patrick Lewis] (2007)

=== Novels ===
- Bridges to Cross (1986)
- Young Indiana Jones and the Pirates' Loot (1994)

=== Nonfiction and professional books ===
- Loads of Codes and Secret Ciphers (1988)
- Favorite Poetry Lessons [with Judy Lynch] (1998)
- Teaching 10 Fabulous Forms of Poetry [with Judy Lynch] (2000)
- How to Write Poetry (2001)
- Writing Funny Bone Poems (2001)
- Seeing the Blue Between: Advice and Inspiration for Young Poets (2002)
- Good for a Laugh: A Guide to Writing Amusing, Clever, and Downright Funny Poems (2003)
- Writing Winning Reports and Essays (2003)
- Opening a Door: Reading Poetry in the Middle School Classroom (2003)
- Top Secret: A Handbook of Codes, Ciphers, and Secret Writing (2004)
- How to Write Haiku and Other Short Poems (2004)
- Rhyming Dictionary [with Sun Young] (2006)
- The Dark Game (2010)

=== Anthologies ===
- The Crystal Image (1977)
- Postcard Poems: A Collection of Poetry for Sharing (1979)
- Don't Forget to Fly: A Cycle of Modern Poems (1981)
- Poetspeak: In Their Work, About Their Work, A Special Kind of Poetry Anthology (1983)
- Strings: A Gathering of Family Poems (1984)
- Pocket Poems: Poems Selected for a Journey (1985)
- This Delicious Day: 65 Poems (1987)
- Going Over to Your Place: Poems for Each Other (1987)
- The Music of What Happens: Poems That Tell Stories (1988)
- The Place My Words Are Looking For: What Poets Say About and Through Their Work (1990)
- Preposterous: Poems of Youth (1991)
- Looking for Your Name: A Collection of Contemporary Poems (1993)
- Poetry from A to Z: A Guide for Young Writers (1994)
- Wherever Home Begins: 100 Contemporary Poems (1995)
- I Feel a Little Jumpy Around You: A Book of Her Poems & His Poems Presented in Pairs [with Naomi Shihab Nye] (1996)
- Home on the Range: Cowboy Poetry (1997)
- Very Best (Almost) Friends: Poems of Friendship (1999)
- Stone Bench In An Empty Park (2000)
- A Poke in the I: A Collection of Concrete Poems (2001)
- Dirty Laundry Pile: Poems in Different Voices (2001)
- Blushing: Expressions of Love in Poems and Letters (2004)
- A Kick in the Head: An Everyday Guide to Poetic Forms (2005)
- Hey, You! Poems to Skyscrapers, Mosquitoes, and Other Fun Things (2007)
- The Death of the Hat: A Brief History of Poetry in 50 Objects (2015)
