= Irene Latham =

American author

- Born: United States
- Education: Hewitt-Trussville High School; University of Alabama at Birmingham; University of Alabama
- Occupation: Author
- Writing career
- Language: English
- Genre: Fiction

Irene Latham is an American author who writes books for children. Latham traveled worldwide with her family before settling in Alabama, in 1984. She is a graduate of Hewitt-Trussville High School and earned degrees in social work from the University of Alabama at Birmingham and the University of Alabama, Tuscaloosa. She is represented by Stimola Literary Studio.

== Bibliography ==
=== Novels ===
- Leaving Gee's Bend. New York: G. P. Putnam's Sons. 2010. ISBN 978-1-101-17152-3.
- Don't Feed the Boy. New York: Roaring Brook Press. 2012. ISBN 978-1-59643-755-5. Illustrated by Stephanie Graegin.
- African Town

=== Picture books ===
- Latham, Irene (2014). Dear Wandering Wildebeest: And Other Poems from the Water Hole. Lerner Publishing. ISBN 978-1-4677-1232-3.
- When the Sun Shines on Antarctica: And Other Poems about the Frozen Continent. Millbrook Press. 2006. ISBN 978-1-4677-5216-9.
- Can I Touch Your Hair?: Poems of Race, Mistakes, and Friendship. Millbrook Press. 2017. ISBN 9781512404425.
- Fresh Delicious: Poems from the Farmers' Market. Boyds Mills Press. 2016. ISBN 9781629791036.
- Love, Agnes: Postcards from an Octopus. Millbrook Press. 2018. ISBN 9781512439939. Illustrated by Thea Baker
- Meet Miss Fancy. Putnam. 2019. ISBN 9780399546686.
- Shamsi-Basha, Karim; Latham, Irene (2020). The Cat Man of Aleppo. Penguin. ISBN 9781984813787.
