= Charlotte Zolotow Award =

American literary award

- Awarded for: outstanding writing in a picture book published in the United States in the preceding year
- Country: United States
- Presented by: Cooperative Children's Book Center
- First award: 1998
- Website: ccbc.education.wisc.edu/literature-resources/charlotte-zolotow-award/

The Charlotte Zolotow Award is an American literary award presented annually for outstanding writing in a picture book published in the United States during the preceding year. By contrast, the Caldecott Medal is for outstanding illustration in a picture book. The Zolotow award was established in 1998 by the Cooperative Children's Book Center (CCBC) at the University of Wisconsin–Madison School of Education and named to honor the work of Charlotte Zolotow, an American children's book editor and author. Ms. Zolotow worked with Harper Junior Books for 38 years during which time she wrote more than 70 picture books. Zolotow attended the University of Wisconsin in Madison on a writing scholarship from 1933 to 36. The Cooperative Children's Book Center is a children's literature library of the School of Education, University of Wisconsin–Madison.

== Eligibility ==
- Any picture book for young children (birth through age seven) originally written in English, and published the United States between January 1 and December 31 is eligible for consideration.
- The book may be fiction, nonfiction or folklore, as long as it is presented in picture book form and aimed at the birth through seven age range.
- Translated books, poetry collections, and easy readers are not eligible.
- The Committee selects one winner each year.
- It may also designate up to five honor books and up to ten titles to be included on a highly commended list that will call attention to outstanding writing in a picture book.

The winner is announced in January each year. A bronze medallion is formally presented to the winning author in the spring during an annual public event that honors the career of Charlotte Zolotow.

== Recipients ==
Charlotte Zolotow Award Recipients, Honors, and Highly Commended books
Year	Author	Title	Citation
1998	Vera B. Williams	Lucky Song	Winner
1998	Keiko Kasza	Don't Laugh, Joe!	Honor
1998	Marion Dane Bauer	If You Were Born a Kitten	Commended
1998	Elisha Cooper	Country Fair	Commended
1998	Denise Fleming	Time to Sleep	Commended
1998	Patricia C. McKissack	Ma Dear's Aprons	Commended
1998	Bernard Waber	Bearsie Bear and the Surprise Sleepover Party	Commended
1998	Rosemary Wells	Bunny Cakes	Commended
1999	Uri Shulevitz	Snow	Winner
1999	Holly Meade	John Willy and Freddy McGee	Honor
1999	William Steig	Pete's a Pizza	Honor
1999	Denise Fleming	Mama Cat Has Three Kittens	Commended
1999	Kevin Henkes	Circle Dogs	Commended
1999	Bill T. Jones and Susan Kuklin	Dance	Commended
1999	Lynn Reiser	Little Clam	Commended
1999	Stephanie Stuve-Bodeen	Elizabeti's Doll	Commended
2000	Molly Bang	When Sophie Gets Angry -- Really, Really Angry....	Winner
2000	Cari Best	Three Cheers for Catherine the Great	Honor
2000	Jules Feiffer	Bark, George	Honor
2000	Baba Wagué Diakité	The Hatseller and the Monkeys: A West African Folktale	Commended
2000	Kristine O'Connell George	Little Dog Poems	Commended
2000	Joan Bransfield Graham	Flicker Flash	Commended
2000	Elizabeth Fitzgerald Howard	When Will Sarah Come?	Commended
2000	Amy Schwartz	How to Catch an Elephant	Commended
2000	Joyce Carol Thomas	You Are My Perfect Baby	Commended
2000	Andrea Zimmerman and David Clemesha	Trashy Town	Commended
2001	Kate Banks	The Night Worker	Winner
2001	Christopher Myers	Wings	Honor
2001	Peggy Christian	If You Find a Rock	Commended
2001	Doreen Cronin	Click, Clack, Moo: Cows That Type	Commended
2001	Joy Harjo	The Good Luck Cat	Commended
2001	Kimiko Kajikawa	Yoshi's Feast	Commended
2001	Sandra L. Pinkney	Shades of Black: A Celebration of Our Children	Commended
2001	Nancy Van Laan	When Winter Comes	Commended
2002	Margaret Willey	Clever Beatrice	Winner
2002	Emily Jenkins	Five Creatures	Honor
2002	Lenore Look	Henry's First-Moon Birthday	Commended
2002	Margaret Read MacDonald	Mabela the Clever	Commended
2002	Marisabina Russo	Come Back, Hannah!	Commended
2002	Catherine Stock	Gugu's House	Commended
2002	Janet S. Wong	Grump	Commended
2003	Holly Keller	Farfallina & Marcel	Winner
2003	Susan Marie Swanson	The First Thing My Mama Told Me	Honor
2003	Nancy Andrews-Goebel	The Pot That Juan Built	Commended
2003	Kate Banks	Close Your Eyes	Commended
2003	Kevin Henkes	Owen's Marshmallow Chick	Commended
2003	Juan Felipe Herrera	Grandma and Me at the Flea / Los Meros Meros Remateros	Commended
2003	Kate McMullan and Jim McMullan	I Stink!	Commended
2003	Jean Davies Okimoto and Elaine M. Aoki	The White Swan Express: A Story About Adoption	Commended
2003	Alice Schertle	All You Need for a Snowman	Commended
2003	David Shannon	Duck on a Bike	Commended
2003	Karma Wilson	Bear Snores On	Commended
2003	Janet S. Wong	Apple Pie 4th of July	Commended
2004	Amy Schwartz	What James Likes Best	Winner
2004	John Coy	Two Old Potatoes and Me	Honor
2004	Rebecca O'Connell	The Baby Goes Beep	Honor
2004	Won-Ldy Paye and Margaret H. Lippert	Mrs. Chicken and the Hungry Crocodile	Honor
2004	James Rumford	Calabash Cat and His Amazing Journey	Honor
2004	George Shannon	Tippy-Toe Chick, Go!	Honor
2004	Kate Banks	Mama's Coming Home	Commended
2004	Deborah Chandra and Madeleine Comora	George Washington's Teeth	Commended
2004	Denise Fleming	Buster	Commended
2004	Jeron Ashford Frame	Yesterday I Had the Blues	Commended
2004	Steve Jenkins and Robin Page	What Do You Do With a Tail Like This?	Commended
2004	Naomi Shihab Nye	Baby Radar	Commended
2004	Lynne Rae Perkins	Snow Music	Commended
2004	Andrea U'Ren	Mary Smith	Commended
2004	Mo Willems	Don't Let the Pigeon Drive the Bus!	Commended
2005	Kevin Henkes	Kitten's First Full Moon	Winner
2005	Lauren Thompson	Polar Bear Night	Honor
2005	Mo Willems	Knuffle Bunny: A Cautionary Tale	Honor
2005	Jacqueline Woodson	Coming On Home Soon	Honor
2005	Karen Beaumont	Baby Danced the Polka	Commended
2005	Caralyn Buehner	Superdog: The Heart of a Hero	Commended
2005	Oliver Dunrea	BooBoo	Commended
2005	Alan Durant	Always and Forever	Commended
2005	Karen English	Hot Day on Abbott Avenue	Commended
2005	Mary Ann Hoberman	Whose Garden Is It?	Commended
2005	Dave Horowitz	A Monkey Among Us	Commended
2005	Patricia MacLachlan and Emily MacLachlan	Bittle	Commended
2005	Carole Lexa Schaefer	The Biggest Soap	Commended
2006	Mary Ann Rodman	My Best Friend	Winner
2006	Patricia C. McKissack and Onawumi Jean Moss	Precious and the Boo Hag	Honor
2006	Jon J Muth	Zen Shorts	Honor
2006	William Bee	Whatever	Commended
2006	Mara Bergman	Snip, Snap! What's That?	Commended
2006	Bob Graham	Oscar's Half Birthday	Commended
2006	Norton Juster	The Hello, Goodbye Window	Commended
2006	Stephen Michael King	Mutt Dog!	Commended
2006	Leslie Patricelli	Binky	Commended
2006	Elivia Savadier	No Haircut Today!	Commended
2006	Sandy Turner	Cool Cat, Hot Dog	Commended
2006	Mo Willems	Leonardo, the Terrible Monster	Commended
2007	Peter McCarty	Moon Plane	Winner
2007	Lenore Look	Uncle Peter's Amazing Chinese Wedding	Honor
2007	Linda Smith	Mrs. Crump's Cat	Honor
2007	Kristen Balouch	Mystery Bottle	Commended
2007	Shari Becker	Maxwell's Mountain	Commended
2007	Eve Bunting	One Green Apple	Commended
2007	Margaret Chodos-Irvine	Best Best Friends	Commended
2007	Robin Cruise	Little Mamá Forgets	Commended
2007	Kevin Henkes	Lilly's Big Day	Commended
2007	Lola M. Schaefer	An Island Grows	Commended
2007	Sarah Weeks	Overboard!	Commended
2007	Jeanne Willis	Gorilla! Gorilla!	Commended
2008	Greg Foley	Thank You, Bear	Winner
2008	Jonathan Bean	At Night	Honor
2008	Lynne Rae Perkins	Pictures from Our Vacation	Honor
2008	Carole Lexa Schaefer	Dragon Dancing	Honor
2008	Maribeth Boelts	Those Shoes	Commended
2008	Robin Cruise	Only You	Commended
2008	Bob Graham	"The Trouble with Dogs..." Said Dad.	Commended
2008	Janice Harrington	The Chicken-Chasing Queen of Lamar County	Commended
2008	Kevin Henkes	A Good Day	Commended
2008	Emily Jenkins	What Happens on Wednesdays	Commended
2008	Patricia C. McKissack	The All-I'll-Ever-Want Christmas Doll	Commended
2008	Sara Pennypacker	Pierre in Love	Commended
2008	Mary Quigley	Granddad's Fishing Buddy	Commended
2008	Lisa Wheeler	Jazz Baby	Commended
2009	Bob Graham	How to Heal a Broken Wing	Winner
2009	Jim Averbeck	In a Blue Room	Honor
2009	Jen Bryant	A River of Words: The Story of William Carlos Williams	Honor
2009	Fran Manushkin	How Mama Brought the Spring	Honor
2009	James Rumford	Silent Music: A Story of Baghdad	Honor
2009	Uri Shulevitz	How I Learned Geography	Honor
2009	Elizabeth Alalou and Ali Alalou	The Butter Man	Commended
2009	Mary Amato	The Chicken of the Family	Commended
2009	Andy Cutbill	The Cow That Laid an Egg	Commended
2009	Greg Foley	Don't Worry Bear	Commended
2009	Kevin Henkes	Old Bear	Commended
2009	Megan McDonald	Hen Hears Gossip	Commended
2009	Charles R. Smith, Jr.	Dance with Me	Commended
2009	Gwendolyn Zepeda	Growing Up with Tamales	Commended
2010	Carmen Tafolla	What Can You Do With a Paleta?	Winner
2010	Florence Parry Heide	Princess Hyacinth (The Surprising Tale of A Girl Who Floated)	Honor
2010	Kevin Henkes	Birds	Honor
2010	David Ezra Stein	Pouch!	Honor
2010	Mem Fox	Hello Baby!	Commended
2010	Keiko Kasza	Ready for Anything	Commended
2010	Vaunda Micheaux Nelson	Who Will I Be, Lord?	Commended
2010	Melissa Stewart	Under the Snow	Commended
2011	Rukhsana Khan	Big Red Lollipop	Winner
2011	Bob Graham	April and Esme: Tooth Fairies	Honor
2011	Sandra Markle	Hip-Pocket Papa	Honor
2011	Phillip C. Stead	A Sick Day for Amos McGee	Honor
2011	Mo Willems	City Dog, Country Frog	Honor
2011	Monica Brown	Chavela and the Magic Bubble	Commended
2011	Greg Foley	Willoughby & the Moon	Commended
2011	Kevin Henkes	My Garden	Commended
2011	Anna Grossnickle Hines	I Am a Backhoe	Commended
2011	Chris Raschka	Little Black Crow	Commended
2011	Karen Lynn Williams	A Beach Tail	Commended
2012	Patrick McDonnell	Me... Jane	Winner
2012	Susan Campbell Bartoletti	Naamah and the Ark at Night	Honor
2012	Jon Katz	Meet the Dogs of Bedlam Farm	Honor
2012	Alison Murray	Apple Pie ABC	Honor
2012	Linda Ashman	Samantha on a Roll	Commended
2012	Albert Bitterman	Fortune Cookies	Commended
2012	Mini Grey	Three By the Sea	Commended
2012	George Ella Lyon	All the Water in the World	Commended
2012	Margaret H. Mason	These Hands	Commended
2012	Meg Medina	Tía Isa Wants a Car	Commended
2012	Joyce Sidman	Swirl by Swirl: Spirals in Nature	Commended
2012	Sue Soltis	Nothing Like a Puffin	Commended
2012	Melissa Sweet	Balloons Over Broadway: The True Story of the Puppeteer of Macy's Parade	Commended
2012	Hyewon Yum	The Twins' Blanket	Commended
2013	Jacqueline Woodson	Each Kindness	Winner
2013	Mary Logue	Sleep Like a Tiger	Honor
2013	Mara Rockliff	Me and Momma and Big John	Honor
2013	Rachel Vail	Flabbersmashed about You	Honor
2013	Julie Danneberg	Monet Paints a Day	Commended
2013	Shane W. Evans	We March	Commended
2013	Kate Feiffer	No Go Sleep!	Commended
2013	Candace Fleming	Oh, No!	Commended
2013	Denise Fleming	underGROUND	Commended
2013	Susan Hood	Spike, the Mixed-Up Monster	Commended
2013	Ginnie Lo	Auntie Yang's Great Soybean Picnic	Commended
2013	Kelly Starling Lyons	Tea Cakes for Tosh	Commended
2013	Doreen Rappaport	Helen's Big World: The Life of Helen Keller	Commended
2014	Lemony Snicket	The Dark	Winner
2014	Jonathan Bean	Building Our House	Honor
2014	Tameka Fryer Brown	My Cold Plum Lemon Pie Bluesy Mood	Honor
2014	Suzanne Collins	Year of the Jungle	Honor
2014	Pat Zietlow Miller	Sophie's Squash	Honor
2014	Jacqueline Woodson	This Is the Rope: A Story from the Great Migration.	Honor
2014	Jonathan Bean	Big Snow	Commended
2014	Floyd Cooper	Max and the Tag-Along Moon	Commended
2014	Bob Graham	The Silver Button	Commended
2014	Yuyi Morales	Niño Wrestles the World	Commended
2014	Eileen Spinelli	When No One Is Watching	Commended
2014	Susan Stockdale	Stripes of All Types	Commended
2014	Jessica Young	My Blue Is Happy	Commended
2015	Jenny Offill	Sparky	Winner
2015	Katherine Applegate	Ivan: The Remarkable True Story of the Shopping Mall Gorilla	Honor
2015	Elizabeth Bluemle	Tap Tap Boom Boom	Honor
2015	Tonya Bolden	Beautiful Moon: A Child's Prayer	Honor
2015	Pat Mora	Water Rolls, Water Rises = El agua rueda, el agua sube	Honor
2015	Barney Saltzberg	Chengdu Could Not, Would Not Fall Asleep	Honor
2015	Laura Gehl	One Big Pair of Underwear	Commended
2015	Thelma Lynne Godin	The Hula-Hoopin’ Queen	Commended
2015	George Ella Lyon	What Forest Knows	Commended
2015	Mary Lyn Ray	Go to Sleep, Little Farm	Commended
2015	Laura Purdie Salas	Water Can Be...	Commended
2015	Melissa Stewart	Beneath the Sun	Commended
2015	Jamie A. Swenson	If You Were a Dog	Commended
2015	Audrey Vernick	Edgar's Second Word	Commended
2015	Brian Won	Hooray for Hat!	Commended
2016	Margarita Engle	Drum Dream Girl: How One Girl's Courage Changed Music	Winner
2016	Kathi Appelt	When Otis Courted Mama	Honor
2016	Lauren Child	The New Small Person	Honor
2016	Matt de la Peña	Last Stop on Market Street	Honor
2016	Lindsay Mattick	Finding Winnie: The True Story of the World's Most Famous Bear	Honor
2016	Sean Taylor	Hoot Owl, Master of Disguise	Honor
2016	Molly Bang	When Sophie's Feelings Are Really, Really Hurt	Commended
2016	Monica Brown	Maya's Blanket / La manta de Maya	Commended
2016	Edwidge Danticat	Mama's Nightingale: A Story of Immigration and Separation	Commended
2016	Bob Graham	How the Sun Got to Coco's House	Commended
2016	Kevin Henkes	Waiting	Commended
2016	Anne Vittur Kennedy	Ragweed's Farm Dog Handbook	Commended
2016	Margaret McNamara	A Poem in Your Pocket	Commended
2016	Miranda Paul	Water Is Water: A Book about the Water Cycle	Commended
2016	Alicia Potter	Miss Hazeltine's Home for Shy and Fearful Cats	Commended
2016	Mary Lyn Ray	Goodnight, Good Dog	Commended
2017	Carole Boston Weatherford	Freedom in Congo Square	Winner
2017	Sherman Alexie	Thunder Boy Jr.	Honor
2017	Candace Fleming	Giant Squid	Honor
2017	Jarvis	Alan's Big, Scary Teeth	Honor
2017	Micha Archer	Daniel Finds a Poem	Commended
2017	Kate Berube	Hannah and Sugar	Commended
2017	Maribeth Boelts	A Bike Like Sergio's	Commended
2017	Isabel Campoy and Theresa Howell	Maybe Something Beautiful: How Art Transformed a Neighborhood	Commended
2017	Irene Dickson	Blocks	Commended
2017	Renata Galindo	My New Mom & Me	Commended
2017	Katrina Goldsaito	The Sound of Silence	Commended
2017	Gemma Merino	The Cow Who Climbed a Tree	Commended
2017	Adam Rex	School's First Day of School	Commended
2017	Duncan Tonatiuh	The Princess and the Warrior	Commended
2018	Bao Phi	A Different Pond	Winner
2018	Atinuke	Baby Goes to Market	Honor
2018	Gaia Cornwall	Jabari Jumps	Honor
2018	Amy Hest	Buster and the Baby	Honor
2018	Bob Raczka	Niko Draws a Feeling	Honor
2018	Cynthia Rylant	Herbert's First Halloween	Honor
2018	Lesa Cline-Ransome	Before She Was Harriet	Commended
2018	Elisha Cooper	Big Cat, Little Cat	Commended
2018	Julia Durango	The One Day House	Commended
2018	Margarita Engle	All the Way to Havana	Commended
2018	Julie Fogliano	When's My Birthday?	Commended
2018	Kevin Henkes	In the Middle of Fall	Commended
2018	Laura McGee Kvasnosky	Little Wolf's First Howling	Commended
2018	Joyce Sidman	Round	Commended
2019	Marla Frazee	Little Brown	Winner
2019	David Ezra Stein	Honey	Honor
2019	Hyewon Yum	Saturday Is Swimming Day	Honor
2019	Grace Lin	A BIG Mooncake for Little Star	Commended
2019	Matt de la Peña	Carmela Full of Wishes	Commended
2019	Jacqueline Woodson	The Day You Begin	Commended
2019	Yuyi Morales	Dreamers	Commended
2019	Maxine Beneba Clarke	The Patchwork Bike	Commended
2019	Brian Lies	The Rough Patch	Commended
2019	Oge Mora	Thank You, Omu!	Commended
2019	Ryan T. Higgins	We Don't Eat Our Classmates	Commended
2019	Kevin Henkes	Winter is Here	Commended
2020	Cheryl Minnema	Johnny's Pheasant	Winner
2020	Kevin Noble Maillard	Fry Bread: A Native American Family Story	Honor
2020	Kao Kalia Yang	A Map into the World	Honor
2020	Matthew Forsythe	Pokko and the Drum	Honor
2020	Oge Mora	Saturday	Honor
2020	Jean Reidy	Truman	Honor
2020	Martin Jenkins	Beware of the Crocodile	Commended
2020	Micha Archer	Daniel's Good Day	Commended
2020	Cori Doerrfeld	Goodbye, Friend! Hello, Friend!	Commended
2020	Isabel Quintero	My Papi Has a Motorcycle	Commended
2020	Kate Read	One Fox: A Counting Book Thriller	Commended
2020	Sydney Smith	Small in the City	Commended
2020	Shabazz Larkin	The Thing About Bees: A Love Letter	Commended
2021–2022	Meg Medina	Evelyn Del Rey Is Moving Away	Winner
2021–2022	Atinuke	Catch That Chicken!	Honor
2021–2022	Hilda Eunice Burgos	The Cot in the Living Room	Honor
2021–2022	Jordan Scott	I Talk like a River	Honor
2021–2022	Julie Fogliano	My Best Friend	Honor
2021–2022	Elizabeth Lilly	Let Me Fix You a Plate: A Tale of Two Kitchens	Honor
2021–2022	Jennifer K. Mann	The Camping Trip	Commended
2021–2022	Joanna Ho	Eyes That Kiss in the Corners	Commended
2021–2022	Alice Faye Duncan	Just like a Mama	Commended
2021–2022	Maribeth Boelts	Kaia and the Bees	Commended
2021–2022	Tom Gauld	The Little Wooden Robot and the Log Princess	Commended
2021–2022	Tami Charles	My Day with the Panye	Commended
2021–2022	Winsome Bingham	Soul Food Sunday	Commended
2021–2022	Kevin Henkes	Sun Flower Lion	Commended
2021–2022	Lesléa Newman	Welcoming Elijah: A Passover Tale with a Tail	Commended
2021–2022	Rajani LaRocca	Where Three Oceans Meet	Commended
2023	Michelle Edwards (writer)	Me and the Boss: A Story about Mending and Love	Winner
2023	Niki Daly	On My Papa's Shoulders	Honor
2023	Nan Forler	Rodney Was a Tortoise	Honor
2023	Sara Greenwood	My Brother Is Away	Honor
2023	Rilla Alexander	Herbert on the Slide	Commended
2023	Jan Andrews	When the Wind Came	Commended
2023	Mac Barnett	The Three Billy Goats Gruff	Commended
2023	Candace Fleming	The Tide Pool Waits	Commended
2023	Matthew Forsythe	Mina	Commended
2023	Kevin Henkes	Little Houses	Commended
2023	Jane Bahk	Juna and Appa	Commended
2023	Grant Snider	One Boy Watching	Commended
2023	Traci Sorell	Powwow Day	Commended
2023	Shay Youngblood	Mama's Home	Commended
2024	Kim Rogers	Just Like Grandma	Winner
2024	Laura Alary	All the Faces of Me	Honor
2024	Laura Purdie Salas	Finding Family: The Duckling Raised by Loons	Honor
2024	Jordan Scott	My Baba's Garden	Honor
2024	Ariel Bernstein	You Go First	Commended
2024	Lucy Ruth Cummins	Our Pool	Commended
2024	X. Fang	Dim Sum Palace	Commended
2024	Emily Jenkins	The Kitten Story: A Mostly True Tale	Commended
2024	Rajani LaRocca	Summer Is for Cousins	Commended
2024	Kim Rogers	A Letter for Bob	Commended
2024	Sydney Smith	Do You Remember?	Commended
2024	Corey R. Tabor	Simon and the Better Bone	Commended
2024	Jesus Trejo	Papa's Magical Water-Jug Clock	Commended
2024	Anne Wynter	Nell Plants a Tree	Commended

== Recipients of Multiple awards, honors, and commendations ==
Kevin Henkes and Bob Graham are the only two authors to receive all three citations and are the two authors who have received the most citations overall (10 and 8, respectively). No author has yet to receive multiple awards. Jonathan Bean is the only author to receive two citations in one year. In 2014 he received an honor for Building Our House and a commendation Big Snow.

=== Multiple honors ===
Three authors have received two Zolotow Honors: Jonathan Bean, James Rumford, Mo Willems, and Jacqueline Woodson.

=== Multiple commendations ===
One author has received nine Zolotow commendations.

- Kevin Henkes, 1999, 2003, 2007, 2008, 2009, 2011, 2016, 2018, 2019

Two authors have received four Zolotow commendations.

- Denise Fleming, 1998, 1999, 2004, 2013
- Bob Graham, 2006, 2008, 2014, 2016

Multiple authors have received two Zolotow commendations: Kate Banks, Maribeth Boelts, Monica Brown, Elisha Cooper, Robin Cruise, Greg Foley, George Ella Lyon, Patricia C. McKissack, Mary Lyn Ray, Joyce Sidman, Melissa Stewart, Mo Willems, and Janet S. Wong.
