= Thi Bui =

American novelist and illustrator (born 1975)

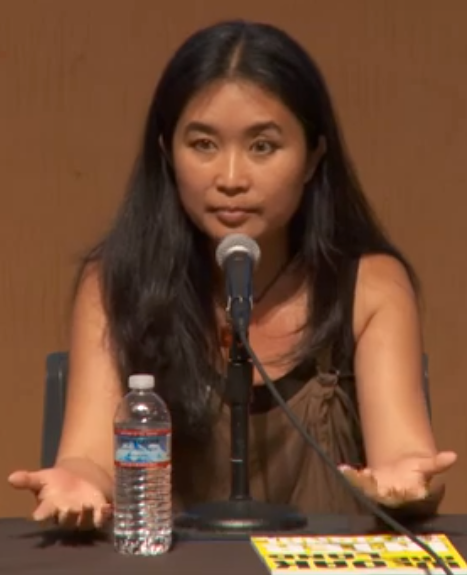
- In a panel discussion in 2017
- Born: 1975 (age 50–51) Saigon, Vietnam
- Areas: Artist and writer
- Notable works: The Best We Could Do; A Different Pond; Chicken of the Sea

Thi Bui (born 1975) is a Vietnam-born American graphic novelist and illustrator. She is most known for her illustrated memoir, The Best We Could Do.

== Biography ==
Thi Bui was born in what was then Saigon, Vietnam three months prior to the Fall of Saigon during the Vietnam War. She is one of six children; two of her older siblings passed away prior to her birth. She and her family were part of the wave of "boat people" from Southeast Asia, arriving at a refugee camp in Malaysia.

== Career ==
Bui has worked as a school teacher for years having worked in schools in New York City and Oakland. She was one of the founders of Oakland International High School in Oakland, California, the first public high school in California for recent immigrants and English learners. There, she worked as an art and digital media teacher. Since 2015, she has been a faculty member of the MFA in Comics program at the California College of the Arts. Prior to her career as an illustrator, she had never had any experience with drawing.

The range of Bui's work often focuses on political and social issues. In 2017, Bui published her first graphic novel The Best We Could Do chronicling the life of her refugee parents and siblings, their life in Vietnam prior to their escape after the Vietnam War and their eventual migration to the United States. The book delves into themes of immigration, war and intergenerational trauma. She worked on the novel for over a decade. The book went on to receive critical acclaim and a number of accolades including National Book Critics Circle, American Book Award and was also a finalist for the Eisner Award for Best Reality-Based Work category among others. In 2017, it made Bill Gates' top five book list. For the 2017 to 2018 academic year, it was selected as UCLA's Common Book and was incorporated into its undergraduate program.

The same year, A Different Pond, a children's picture book, was published. She worked on the book as an illustrator and collaborated with spoken word artist and writer Bao Phi for the project. A Different Pond went on to win the Caldecott Honor for illustration.

In 2019, she teamed up with acclaimed novelist Viet Thanh Nguyen for a new picture book titled Chicken of the Sea. Nguyen and Bui collaborated with their sons to create the story with Nguyen and his son Ellison as writers and Bui and her son Hien as illustrators.

Since her debut work, she has gone on to write and illustrate short-form comics about many domestic political issues within the Southeast Asian community. Her next book, Nowhereland, will focus on the topics of incarceration and deportation of the Southeast Asian people in the United States. She is also working on a science fiction story about climate change in Vietnam and in poorer countries.

== Works ==
- 2012: We Are Oakland International (Immigration Stories from Oakland International High School, Volume 4) (as an editor)
- 2017: The Best We Could Do, New York: Abrams ComicArts ISBN 1419718770 (author and illustrator)
- 2017: A Different Pond (Written by Bao Phi), North Mankato, Minnesota: Capstone ISBN 1623708036 (as an illustrator)
- 2018: Displaced: Refugee Writers on Refugee Lives, Abrams Books ISBN 141973511X (as a writing contributor for "Perspective and What Gets Lost")
- 2018: Refugee to Detainee: How the U.S. is Deporting Those Seeking a Safe Haven (short comic)
- 2019: Chicken of the Sea, San Francisco, McSweeney's Publishing ISBN 194421173X (as an illustrator alongside Hien Bui-Stafford)
- 2020: In/Vulnerable: Inequity in the time of pandemic, a co-publication of Reveal and The Nib (as an illustrator)

== Awards ==
- The Best We Could Do
  - 2017: UCLA's Common Book
  - 2017: National Book Critics Circle finalist
  - 2018: American Book Award
  - 2018: Eisner Award finalist (Reality-based Comics)
- A Different Pond
  - 2017: Caldecott Honor for illustration
