= The Chain Gang (book series) =

Book series by Robin and Christine Lawrie

- The logo for The Chain Gang series

Publication information
- Publisher: Evans Brothers, Stone Arch Books (imprints of Capstone Publishers)
- Genre: Racing
- No. of issues: 18

Creative team
- Written by: Robin Lawrie, Christine Lawrie
- Artist: Robin Lawrie

The Chain Gang is a collection of books written by English illustrator and author Robin Lawrie and his wife Christine Lawrie. The series follows the adventures of a group of young mountain bikers.

== The Books ==
1. Muddy Mayhem
2. Chain Reaction
3. Winged Avenger
4. Fear 3.1
5. Shock Tactics
6. White Lightning
7. Cheat Challenge
8. 2 Xc 4 my Shirt
9. Snow Bored
10. Return Descender
11. Block Busters
12. Sweet Revenge
13. Paintball Panic
14. Radar Riders
15. First Among Losers
16. Ballerina Biker
17. Gone Green
18. Treetop Trauma

== American Versions (Ridge Riders) ==
The chain gang series was re-branded by American Publisher stone arch in 2007 who renamed the series "ridge riders".
