= Beth Krommes =

American children's illustrator (born 1956)

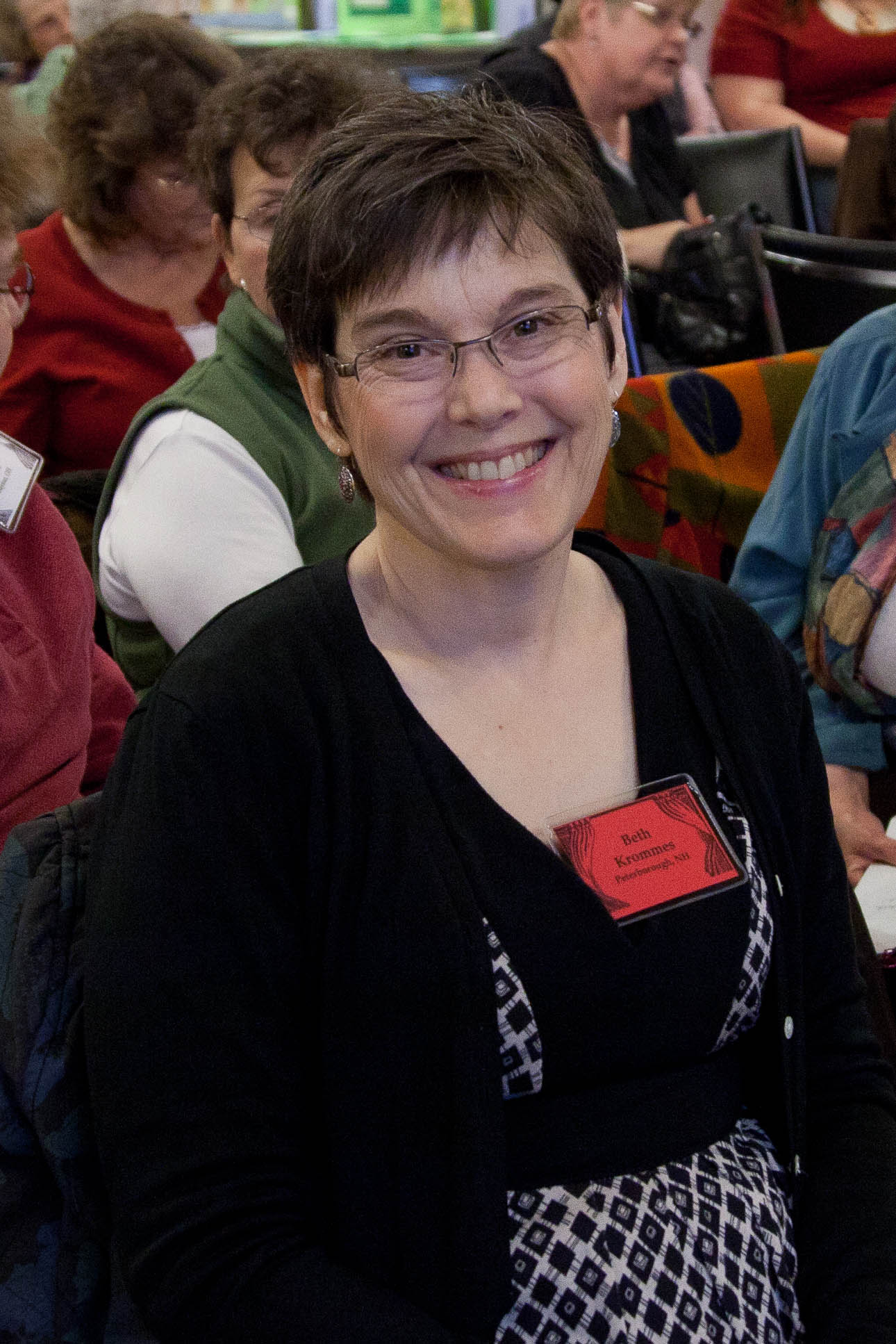
- Krommes at the Mazza Museum in 2010
- Born: 1956 (age 69–70); Pennsylvania, U.S.
- Occupation: Illustrator
- Writing career
- Period: 1999–present
- Genre: Children's picture books
- Notable work: The House in the Night
- Notable awards: Caldecott Medal; 2009

Beth Krommes (born 1956) is an American illustrator of children's books. Her work has won several honors, including the 2002 Golden Kite Award and the 2009 Caldecott Medal.

== Biography ==
Krommes was born in Pennsylvania in 1956. She attended Syracuse University, where she earned a BFA in painting, and the University of Massachusetts Amherst, where she earned an MAT in art education. She has been illustrating children's books since 1989. Her illustrations for The Lamp, the Ice, and the Boat Called Fish won her the 2001 Golden Kite Award for picture book illustration. In 2009, she won the Caldecott Medal for her work on The House in the Night. She is married, has two daughters and lives in Peterborough, New Hampshire.

- Grandmother Winter, written by Phyllis Root (Houghton Mifflin Co., 1999)
- The Lamp, the Ice, and the Boat Called Fish, Jacqueline Briggs Martin (HM, 2001)
- The Sun in Me: Poems About the Planet (Cambridge: Barefoot Books, 2003), anthology, ed. Judith Nicholls, 40 pp., OCLC 51724851
- The Hidden Folk: Stories of Fairies, Dwarves, Selkies and Other Secret Beings, Lise Lunge-Larsen (HM, 2004), 72 pp.
- Butterfly Eyes and Other Secrets of the Meadow, Joyce Sidman (HM, 2006)
- The House in the Night, Susan Marie Swanson (HM, 2008)
- Swirl by Swirl: Spirals in Nature, Joyce Sidman (HM, 2011)
- Blue on Blue, Dianne White (Beach Lane Books) – September 2014, LCCN 2012-14239
- Before Morning, Joyce Sidman (HMH, 2016)
