= Amy Schwartz (author) =

American author and illustrator (1954–2023)

- Born: April 2, 1954; San Diego, California, U.S.
- Died: February 26, 2023 (aged 68)
- Education: California College of Arts and Crafts (BFA)
- Occupation: Author
- Spouse: Leonard S. Marcus (1990–2023)
- Children: 1
- Awards: Sydney Taylor Book Award (1984); Charlotte Zolotow Award (2004)

Amy Schwartz (April 2, 1954 – February 26, 2023) was an American author and illustrator of children's books. Over thirty years, she published 60 children's books, some of which have been widely recognized. As an illustrator, she was "best known for her warm, humorous tales with a kid-centered point of view, and her equally distinctive gouache and pen-and-ink artwork."

== Personal life and education ==
Schwartz was born on April 2, 1954, in San Diego to Henry Schwartz, a writer, and Eva Schwartz, a chemistry professor. She grew up on the West Coast with her parents and three sisters.

Schwartz graduated high school early and started university at Antioch College, though she transferred to California College of Arts and Crafts a year later. She received a Bachelor of Fine Arts degree in drawing in 1976. Three years later, she illustrated her first book. The publication inspired her to move to New York City for work, where she eventually settled. Early in her time in New York, she took a course about writing and illustrating children's books from the School for Visual Arts, which led to her first publication in 1982, Bea and Mrs. Jones. Throughout the 1980s, she wrote and illustrated multiple books and was able to do so full-time.

Schwartz married Leonard S. Marcus in 1990, and in 1992, they had a son, Jacob.

Before her sudden death on February 26, 2023, she lived in Brooklyn with her husband.

== Awards and honors ==
In 1982, Schwartz's debut children's book, Bea and Mrs. Jones, was featured in the New York Public Library’s selection of 100 Best Children’s Books. Bea and Mr. Jones, Begin at the Beginning, A Teeny Tiny Baby were featured on the television program Reading Rainbow in 1971, 1984, and 1997, respectively, as was The Purple Coat by Amy Hest, which Schwartz illustrated. In 2006, Schwartz's booksellers selected Bea and Mr. Jones for the "Happiest to See Back in Print" Cuffies Award. The Horn Book Magazine named Annabelle Swift, Kindergartner and What James Likes Best one of the best Picture Books of the year in 1988 and 2003, respectively. Three of Schwartz's books are Junior Library Guild selections: Starring Miss Darlene (2007), Tiny & Hercules (2009), and 13 Stories About Harris (2020). The Cooperative Children's Book Center included Starring Miss Darlene in their 2008 CCBC Choices publication, "an annual list of recommended books for children and young adults selected by the librarians at the Cooperative Children's Book Center." Polka Dots for Poppy was named a Bank Street Best Children's Book of the Year.

Awards for Schwartz's writing
Year	Title	Award	Result	Ref.
1984	Mrs. Moskowitz and the Sabbath Candlesticks	Sydney Taylor Book Award for Younger Readers	Winner	
1986	Yossel Zissel and the Wisdom of Chelm	Sydney Taylor Book Award for Younger Readers	Notable title	
1990	Fancy Aunt Jess (as illustrator)	Sydney Taylor Book Award for Younger Readers	Notable title	
2000	How to Catch an Elephant	Charlotte Zolotow Award	Commended title	
2004	What James Likes Best	Charlotte Zolotow Award	Winner	
2013	Willie and Uncle Bill	American Library Association Rainbow List	Selection	

== Publications ==
=== As author ===
- Bea and Mr. Jones (1982)
- Begin at the Beginning: A Little Artist Learns about Life (1983)
- Mrs. Moskowitz and the Sabbath Candlesticks (1983)
- Her Majesty, Aunt Essie (1984)
- Yossel Zissel and the Wisdom of Chelm (1986)
- Oma and Bobo (1987)
- Annabelle Swift, Kindergartner (1991)
- Camper of the Week (1991)
- Old MacDonald (1999)
- How to Catch An Elephant (2000)
- Some Babies (2000)
- A Teeny Tiny Baby (2000)
- The Boys Team (2001)
- A Glorious Day (2004)
- Things I Learned in Second Grade (2004)
- What James Likes Best (2004)
- A Beautiful Girl (2006)
- Oscar: The Big Adventure of a Little Sock Monkey (2006)
- Starring Miss Darlene (2007)
- Tiny and Hercules (2009)
- Lucy Can't Sleep (2012)
- Willie and Uncle Bill (2012)
- Dee Dee and Me (2013)
- 100 Things That Make Me Happy (2014)
- I Can't Wait! (2015)
- Polka Dots for Poppy (2016)
- 100 Things I Love to Do with You (2017)
- Things That Make Me Happy (2017)
- Busy Babies (2019)
- 13 Stories about Harris (2020)
- Things I Love to Do with You (2020)
- 100 Things I Know How to Do (2021)
- 13 Stories about Ayana (2022)
- Things I Know How to Do (expected 2023)

=== As illustrator ===
- The Breakfast Book (1979)
- My Island Grandma by Kathryn Lasky (1979)
- The Crack-Of-Dawn Walkers by Amy Hest (1983)
- The Night Flight by Joanne Ryder (1985)
- The Witch Who Lives Down the Hall by Donna Guthrie (1985)
- The Purple Coat by Amy Hest (1986)
- Maggie Doesn't Want To Move by Elizabeth Lee O'Donnell (1987)
- The Scarecrows and Their Child by Mary Stolz (1987)
- Because of Lozo Brown by Larry L. King (1988)
- Jane Martin, Dog Detective by Eve Bunting (1988)
- How I Captured a Dinosaur by Henry Schwartz (1989)
- The Lady Who Put Salt in Her Coffee: From the Peterkin Papers by Lucretia P. Hale (1989)
- Blow Me a Kiss, Miss Lilly by Nancy White Carlstrom (1990)
- Fancy Aunt Jess by Amy Hest (1990)
- Albert Goes Hollywood by Henry Schwartz (1992)
- Nana's Birthday Party by Amy Hest (1993)
- Make a Face: A Book with a Mirror by Henry Schwartz (1994)
- Gabby Growing Up by Amy Hest (1998)
- A Little Kitty by Jane Feder (2009)
- Babyberry Pie by Heather Vogel Frederick (2010)
- The Extra Ordinary Sheep by Aerin Nicole (2107)
