= Bao Phi =

American writer

Bao Phi is a Vietnamese-American spoken word artist, writer and community activist living in Minnesota. Bao Phi's collection of poems, Sông I Sing, was published in 2011 and, Thousand Star Hotel, was published in 2017 by Coffee House Press. He has written three children’s books published by Capstone Press. First book, A Different Pond received multiple awards, including the Caldecott Award, Charlotte Zolotow Award, the Asian/Pacific American Awards for Literature for best picture book, the Minnesota Book Award for picture books.

== Early life and education ==
Bao Phi was born in Saigon, Vietnam as the youngest son to a Vietnamese mother and a Chinese-Vietnamese father. He grew up in the Phillips neighborhood of South Minneapolis near the Little Earth housing projects. Phi attended Minneapolis South High School and began performing his poetry when competing on the South High speech team in the Creative Expression category in the early 1990s. He attended and graduated from Macalester College, where he was encouraged to pursue creative writing by Native American Literature professor, Diane Glancy.

== Poetry, activism and literature ==
Phi won the Minnesota Grand Poetry Slam twice. He is the first Vietnamese-American man to have appeared on HBO's Russell Simmons Presents Def Poetry, and the National Poetry Slam Individual Finalists Stage, where he placed 6th overall out of over 250 national slam poets. Phi has been a featured performer at numerous venues and schools locally and nationally, from the Nuyorican Poet's Café to the University of California, Berkeley.

In 2005, Phi released his CD, Refugeography. Billy Collins selected one of Phi’s poems, "Race," for inclusion in The Best American Poetry 2006 anthology. Phi is also published in various literary magazines, journals, and anthologies, including From Both Sides Now, the Def Poetry Jam anthology, Legacy to Liberation, Screaming Monkeys, and the Michigan Quarterly Review. His poetry is included in the EMC/Paradigm line of English textbooks for high school students, and has done voice work for their educational materials. One of his poems was selected to appear in Minneapolis/Saint Paul city buses in the Poetry in Motion program. He is also the author of the chapbook Surviving the Translation.

Phi has been a featured artist in many community events, rallies and functions. He was involved with the Justice for Fong Lee committee and all three protests against Miss Saigon produced by the Ordway Theater.

Bao Phi's collection of poems, Sông I Sing, was published In 2011 by Coffeehouse Press. It focused on modern Vietnamese-Asian American life with each poem capable of being read for spoken word. The book received a favorable review in The New York Times. In 2017, Phi and illustrator, Thi Bui, released a children's book with Capstone Publishers titled A Different Pond, which earned the prestigious Caldecott Honor.

Phi has taught workshops and performed for youth for organizations from the W.O.C. in Minneapolis to the Chinatown Community Development Center in San Francisco. He was an advisory panel member, workshop moderator, and performer for Intimacy and Geography, the Asian American Writers' Workshop national poetry festival in New York, and a faculty at Kundiman at Fordham University in 2015. That year, he was also a performer in the diasporic Vietnamese blockbuster variety show, Paris By Night.

== The Loft Literary Center ==
Phi worked at The Loft Literary Center, a nonprofit literary organization in Minneapolis, for more than 20 years, most recently as Program Director. He managed and operated several Loft programs, including Equilibrium, a successful spoken word series he created, which invites nationally recognized artists of color/indigenous artists to share the stage with local Minnesota artists of color/indigenous artists. Equilibrium was awarded the Anti-Racism Initiative award from the Minnesota Council of Nonprofits in 2010. Phi left the Loft in 2022 and joined the McKnight Foundation as Arts & Culture program officer.

== Awards and honors ==
Phi has received numerous awards and honors, including multiple Minnesota State Arts Board Artist Initiative grants. He was also a featured listener in the award-winning documentary film The Listening Project.

== Published works ==
=== Poetry ===
- Thousand Star Hotel, (Coffee House Press, 2017)
- Sông I Sing, (Coffee House Press, 2011)

=== Children's literature ===
- A Different Pond, (Capstone Press, 2017; illustrated by Thi Bui)
  - Honor, 2018 Caldecott Award
  - Winner, 2018 Charlotte Zolotow Award
  - Winner, 2017-2017 Asian/Pacific American Awards for Literature for best picture book
  - Winner, 2018 Minnesota Book Award
- My Footprints, (Capstone Press, 2019; illustrated by Basia Tran)
- Hello, Mandarin Duck!, (Capstone Press, 2019; illustrated by Dion MBD)

== Personal life ==
Bao has one child, with an ex-wife who he continues to co-parent with. His child is the inspiration for many of his works, including “My Footprints” and “A Different Pond”.
