= Candace Fleming =

American children's writer (born 1962)

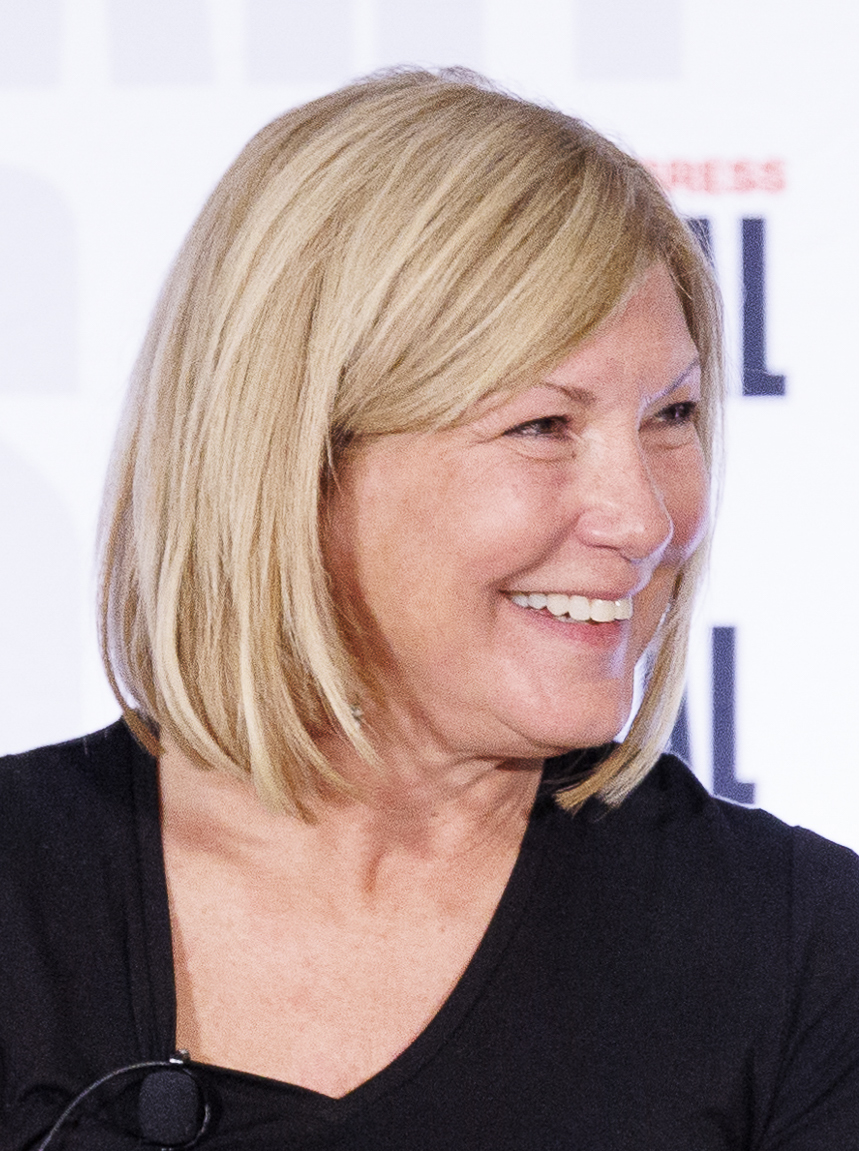
- Fleming in 2024
- Born: May 24, 1962 (age 64); Michigan City, Indiana
- Education: Eastern Illinois University
- Writing career
- Notable awards: Boston Globe–Horn Book Award (2009, 2014); Cybils Award (2011, 2014, 2016); Golden Kite Award (2012, 2015); Los Angeles Times Book Prize (2014); NCTE Orbis Pictus Award (2015); Sibert Medal (2021); American Library Association (ALA) / YALSA Award for Excellence in Nonfiction (2021); American Library Association (ALA) / Association for Library Service to Children (ALSC) Children's Literature Legacy Award (2026); American Library Association (ALA) / Young Adult Library Services Association (YALSA) Margaret A. Edwards Award (2026)

Candace Groth Fleming (born May 24, 1962) is an American writer of children's books, both fiction and non-fiction. She is the author of more than 50 books for children and young adults, including the Los Angeles Times Book Prize-honored The Family Romanov and the Boston Globe–Horn Book Award-winning biography, The Lincolns, among others.

In 2013, the Children's Book Council named Fleming a Children's Book Month Champion, and in 2014, Fleming was awarded the Children's Book Guild Nonfiction Award. In 2016, she was a finalist for the NSK Neustadt Prize for Children's Literature, which "celebrates the importance of children's and young-adult literature and the impact it has on our children's minds." Thirty-two of her books are Junior Library Guild selections.

In 2026, two different divisions of the American Library Association awarded Fleming lifetime achievement awards: the Children's Literature Legacy Award (awarded by the Association for Library Service to Children) and the Margaret A. Edwards award (awarded by the Young Adults Library Services Association).

== Biography ==
Fleming was born May 24, 1962, in Michigan City, Indiana to Charles and Carol Groth. She received a Bachelor of Arts from Eastern Illinois University in 1985. She married Scott Fleming November 9, 1985 and they have two children.

From 1997 to 2005, Fleming was a teacher at William Rainey Harper College near Chicago. Since that time, she has worked full-time as a writer, educator, and speaker.

Her first picture book Professor Fergus Fahrenheit and his Wonderful Weather Machine was published by Simon & Schuster in 1994 as written by "Candace Groth-Fleming" and illustrated by Don Weller (LCCN 93-4432). Subsequent publications have all appeared under the name Candace Fleming.

== Selected texts ==
=== The Lincolns (2008) ===
The Lincolns: A Scrapbook Look at Abraham and Mary, published October 14, 2008 by Schwartz & Wade, is a nonfiction children's book about Abraham Lincoln and his wife, Mary. The book is a Junior Library Guild selection. The Horn Book Magazine, Kirkus Reviews and School Library Journal named it one of the best nonfiction children's books of 2008.

Awards for The Lincolns
Year	Award	Result	Ref.
2008	Los Angeles Times Book Prize for Young Adult Novel	Finalist	
2009	Boston Globe–Horn Book Award for Nonfiction	Winner	
2009	Great Lakes Book Award: Children's Chapter Books	Finalist	
2009	NCTE Orbis Pictus Award	Honor	

=== The Great and Only Barnum (2009) ===
The Great and Only Barnum: The Tremendous, Stupendous Life of Showman P. T. Barnum, published September 8, 2009 by Schwartz & Wade and illustrated by Ray Fenwick, is a nonfiction children's picture book about P. T. Barnum. The book is a Junior Library Guild selection. Publishers Weekly named it one of the best children's books of 2009. In 2010, Booklist included The Great and Only Barnum on their "Top 10 Biographies for Youth" list.

Awards for The Great and Only Barnum
Year	Award	Result	Ref.
2010	ALA Best Fiction for Young Adults	Selection	
2010	ALSC Notable Children's Books	Selection	
2010	YALSA Award for Excellence in Nonfiction	Finalist	

=== Amelia Lost (2011) ===
Amelia Lost: The Life and Disappearance of Amelia Earhart, published February 8, 2011 by Schwartz & Wade, is a nonfiction middle-grade children's book about Amelia Earhart. In 2011, The Horn Book Magazine named it one of the best nonfiction children's books of the year, and Bank Street College of Education named it a book of outstanding merit for children aged nine to twelve and twelve to fourteen.

Awards for Amelia Lost
Year	Award	Result	Ref.
2011	Cybils Award for Middle Grade & Young Adult Nonfiction	Winner	
2012	Golden Kite Award for Nonfiction	Winner	
2012	NCTE Orbis Pictus Award	Honor	

=== Oh, No! (2012) ===
Oh, No!, published September 11, 2012 and illustrated by Eric Rohmann, is a fictional picture book about a series of animals who fall into a hole. Bank Street College of Education named it one of the best books of the year for children age five to nine.

Awards for Oh, No!
Year	Award	Result	Ref.
2013	Bull-Bransom Award	Nominee	
2013	Charlotte Zolotow Award	Highly Commended	
2013	The E.B. White Read Aloud Award for Picture Book	Shortlist	
2013	PEN/Steven Kroll Award	Shortlist	

=== The Family Romanov (2014) ===
The Family Romanov: Murder, Rebellion, and the Fall of Imperial Russia, published July 8, 2014 by Schwartz & Wade, is a nonfiction children's book about the Romanovs.

Both the book and audiobook editions of The Family Romanov are Junior Library Guild selections. In 2014, The Bulletin of the Center for Children's Books, The Horn Book Magazine, School Library Journal named it of the best nonfiction children's books of the year. Publishers Weekly named it one of the best young adult books of the year. Booklist included it on their 2014 "Top of the List" and 2015 "Top 10 Biographies for Youth" lists. School Library Journal included the audiobook edition in their list of the top ten best audiobooks of the year.

Awards for The Family Romanov
Year	Award	Result	Ref.
2014	Booklist Editors' Choice: Books for Youth	Selection	
2014	Boston Globe–Horn Book Award for Nonfiction	Winner	
2014	Cybils Award for Young Adult Nonfiction	Winner	
2014	Los Angeles Times Book Prize for Young Adult Novel	Winner	
2015	ALSC Notable Children's Recordings	Selection	
2015	Golden Kite Award for Nonfiction	Winner	
2015	NCTE Orbis Pictus Award	Winner	
2015	Sibert Medal	Finalist	
2015	YALSA Award for Excellence in Nonfiction	Finalist	
2016	William Allen White Children's Book Award	Nominee	

=== Giant Squid (2016) ===
Giant Squid, published September 27, 2016 by Roaring Brook Press and illustrated by Eric Rohmann, is a nonfiction children's book about giant squids. Giant Squid is a Junior Library Guild book. In 2016, Horn Book Magazine and the New York Public Library named it one of the best nonfiction children's books of the year. In 2017, Bank Street College of Education named it one of the best books for children ages five to nine.

Awards for Giant Squid
Year	Award	Result	Ref.
2016	Cybils Award for Elementary Nonfiction	Winner	
2017	ALSC Notable Children's Books	Selection	
2017	Charlotte Zolotow Award	Honor	
2017	NCTE Orbis Pictus Award	Honor	
2017	Sibert Medal	Honor	
2018	William Allen White Children's Book Award	Nominee	

=== Honeybee (2020) ===
Honeybee: The Busy Life of Apis Mellifera, published February 4, 2020 by Neal Porter Books and illustrated by Eric Rohmann, is a nonfiction picture book about honey bees. Honeybee is a Junior Library Guild book. Publishers Weekly and Shelf Awareness named it one of the best picture books of 2020, and The Bulletin of the Center for Children's Books and Horn Book Magazine included it on their list of the best nonfiction children's books of the year. Bank Street College of Education named it a book of outstanding merit for children aged nine to twelve.

Awards for Honeybee
Year	Award	Result	Ref.
2020	Cybils Award for Elementary Nonfiction	Finalist	
2021	NCTE Cook Prize	Honor	
2021	NCTE Orbis Pictus Award	Honor	
2021	Sibert Medal	Winner	

=== The Rise and Fall of Charles Lindbergh (2020) ===
The Rise and Fall of Charles Lindbergh, published February 11, 2020 by Schwartz & Wade, is a nonfiction children's book about Charles Lindbergh.

Both the book and audiobook editions of The Rise and Fall of Charles Lindbergh are Junior Library Guild selections. Publishers Weekly named it one of the best young adult books of 2020, and Booklist included it on their 2020 "Top 10 Biographies for Youth" list. The Bulletin of the Center for Children's Books, Horn Book Magazine, and School Library Journal included it on their lists of the best nonfiction children's books of the year.

Awards for The Rise and Fall of Charles Lindbergh
Year	Award	Result	Ref.
2020	Booklist Editors' Choice: Books for Youth	Selection	
2021	Amazing Audiobooks for Young Adults	Selection	
2021	YALSA Award for Excellence in Nonfiction	Winner	

== Publications ==
=== Picture books ===
- Professor Ferguson Fahrenheit and his Wonderful Weather Machine (1994)
- Women of the Lights (1995), illustrated by James Watling
- Madame LaGrande and Her So High, to the Sky, Uproarious Pompadour (1996), illustrated by S.D. Schindler
- Gabriella's Song (1997), illustrated by Giselle Potter
- Westward Ho, Carlotta! (1997), illustrated by David Catrow
- The Hatmaker's Sign (1998), illustrated by Robert A. Parker
- When Agnes Caws (1999), illustrated by Giselle Potter
- A Big Cheese for the White House: The True Tale of a Tremendous Cheddar (1999), illustrated by S.D. Schindler
- Who Invited You? (2001), illustrated by George Booth
- Muncha! Muncha! Muncha! (2002), illustrated by G. Brian Karas
- Boxes for Katje (2003), illustrated by Stacey Dressen-McQueen
- Smile, Lily! (2004), illustrated by Yumi Heo
- Gator Gumbo: A Spicy-Hot Tale (2004), illustrated by Sally Anne Lambert
- This Is the Baby (2004), illustrated by Maggie Smith
- Sunny Boy!: The Life and Times of a Tortoise (2005), illustrated by Anne Wilsdorf
- Tippy-Tippy-Tippy
  - Tippy-Tippy-Tippy, Hide! (2007), illustrated by G. Brian Karas
  - Tippy-Tippy-Tippy, Splash! (2014), illustrated by G. Brian Karas
- Imogene's Last Stand (2009), illustrated by Nancy Carpenter
- Seven Hungry Babies (2010), illustrated by Eugene Yelchin
- Clever Jack Takes the Cake (2010), illustrated by G. Brian Karas
- Oh, No! (2012), illustrated by Eric Rohmann
- Papa's Mechanical Fish (2013), illustrated by Boris Kolikov
- Bulldozer
  - Bulldozer's Big Day (2015), illustrated by Eric Rohmann
  - Bulldozer Helps Out (2017), illustrated by Eric Rohmann
- Go Sleep In Your Own Bed! (2017), illustrated by Lori Nichols
- Emma's Circus (2017), illustrated by Christine Davenier
- The Amazing Collection of Joey Cornell (2018), illustrated by Gérard DuBois
- Cubs in the Tub: The True Story of the Bronx Zoo's First Woman Zookeeper (2020), illustrated by Julie Downing
- Bulldozer's Christmas Dig (2021), illustrated by Eric Rohmann
- What Isabella Wanted (2021), illustrated by Matt Cordell
- Polar Bear (2022), illustrated by Eric Rohmann
- The Tide Pool Waits (2022), illustrated by Amy Hevron
- Mine! (2023), illustrated by Eric Rohmann
- Penny & Pip (2023), illustrated by Eric Rohmann
- Narwhal: The Unicorn of the Arctic (2024), illustrated by Deena So'oteh

=== Fiction ===
- Aesop Elementary
  - The Fabled Fourth Graders of Aesop Elementary School (2005)
  - The Fabled Fifth Graders of Aesop Elementary School (2010)
- Lowji Discovers America (2005)
- On the Day I Died: Stories from the Grave (2010)
- History Pals
  - Ben Franklin's in My Bathroom! (2017), illustrated by Marc Fearing
  - Eleanor Roosevelt's in My Garage! (2018), illustrated by Marc Fearing
- Strongheart: Wonder Dog of the Silver Screen (2018), illustrated by Eric Rohmann

=== Non-fiction ===
- Ben Franklin's Almanac: Being a True Account of the Good Gentleman's Life (2003)
- Our Eleanor: A Scrapbook Look at Eleanor Roosevelt's Remarkable Life (2005)
- The Lincolns: A Scrapbook Look at Abraham and Mary (2008)
- The Great and Only Barnum: The Tremendous, Stupendous Life of Showman P. T. Barnum (2009)
- Amelia Lost: The Life and Disappearance of Amelia Earhart (2011)
- The Family Romanov: Murder, Rebellion, and the Fall of Imperial Russia (2014)
- Presenting Buffalo Bill: The Man Who Invented the Wild West (2016)
- Giant Squid (2016), illustrated by Eric Rohmann
- Honeybee: The Busy Life of Apis Mellifera (2020)
- The Rise and Fall of Charles Lindbergh (2020)
- The Curse of the Mummy: Uncovering Tutankhamun's Tomb (2021)
- Crash From Outer Space: Unraveling the Mystery of Flying Saucers, Alien Beings, and Roswell (2022)
- Murder Among Friends: How Leopold and Loeb Tried to Commit the Perfect Crime (2022)
- The Enigma Girls: How Ten Teenagers Broke Ciphers, Kept Secrets, and Helped Win World War II (2024)
- Is It Real? The Loch Ness Monster (2025)
- Death in the Jungle: Murder, Betrayal, and the Lost Dream of Jonestown (2025)

=== Anthologies ===
- Guys Read True Stories (2014) edited by Jon Scieszka. Contributed “A Jumbo Story” about Jumbo the elephant.
- Our Story Begins: your favorite authors and illustrators share fun, inspiring, and occasionally ridiculous things they wrote and drew as kids (2017) edited by Elissa Brent Weissman.
- Fatal Throne: The Wives of Henry VIII Tell All (2018) concept by Candace Fleming. Written by M. T. Anderson (Henry VIII), Candace Fleming (Katharine of Aragon), Stephanie Hemphill (Anne Boleyn), Lisa Ann Sandell (Jane Seymour), Jennifer Donnelly (Anna of Cleves), Linda Sue Park (Catherine Howard), and Deborah Hopkinson (Kateryn Parr).
