= My Friend Rabbit =

2002 book by Eric Rohmann

- The front cover of the book My Friend Rabbit
- Author: Eric Rohmann
- Illustrator: Eric Rohmann
- Cover artist: Eric Rohmann
- Language: English
- Genre: Children's picture book
- Publisher: Roaring Brook Press and Millbrook Press
- Publication date: 2002
- Publication place: United States
- Pages: 32 pages
- ISBN: 978-1-59643-080-8
- Preceded by: The Three Pigs
- Followed by: The Man Who Walked Between the Towers

My Friend Rabbit is a children's picture book written and illustrated by Eric Rohmann and first published in 2002. The illustrations in the book earned Rohmann the Caldecott Medal in 2003. My Friend Rabbit was adapted into an animated television series in 2007.

== Description ==
My Friend Rabbit is a 32-page children's picture book, which follows the adventures of a mouse and a rabbit.

Rohmann used "thick-lined colored woodcuts" to illustrate his book. The reader needs to turn the book sideways to look at one image properly, making "the climax [...] even more dramatic". According to a reviewer in Booklist, the book's "[t]remendous physical humor delivers a gentle lesson about accepting friends as they are".

== Synopsis ==
A mouse loans his new airplane to his best friend, Rabbit, resulting in a series of troublesome events. When the airplane gets stuck in a tree, Rabbit gathers a group of animals in an attempt to retrieve it. The plan goes awry and the animals fall, causing them to become angry with Rabbit. Despite this, Mouse remains loyal to his friend and demonstrates the true nature of friendship. In the end, Rabbit comes up with a new idea to retrieve the airplane, leading to further adventures.

== Television series ==
My Friend Rabbit
- Genre: Adventure; Comedy; Educational; Children's television series
- Created by: Eric Rohmann
- Directed by: Jason Groh
- Voices of: Peter Oldring; Richard Binsley
- Theme music composer: John Welsman; Cherie Camp
- Opening theme: We Can Do it Together by Cherie Camp
- Ending theme: We Can Do it Together (Instrumental)
- Composer: John Welsman
- Country of origin: Canada
- No. of series: 2
- No. of episodes: 26

Production
- Executive producers: Eric Rohmann; Paul Robertson; Scott Dyer; Doug Murphy
- Producers: Lan Lamon; Jamie Piekarz
- Animator: 9 Story Media Group
- Running time: 30 minutes
- Production company: Nelvana Limited

Original release
- Network: Treehouse TV
- Release: February 25 – November 2, 2008

In the autumn of 2007, Nelvana produced an animated children's television show based on My Friend Rabbit. The program was recognized with several awards, including the Pulcinella Award for Best Preschool TV Series in 2008 and the Alliance of Children's Television Award for Best Preschool Series in 2009. The show was also nominated for three Gemini Awards in categories that included Best Direction, Best Musical Scoring, and Best Screenwriting. The nominees were Jason Groh for Best Direction, John Welsman for Best Musical Scoring, and Steve Westren for Best Screenwriting. Ultimately, Steve Westren won the award.

This show aired on Qubo (first on the network on October 4, 2007, and the programming blocks on NBC and Telemundo on October 6) and continued until July 25, 2020.

== Cast and characters ==
- Rabbit (voiced by Peter Oldring) is an enthusiastic, fun-loving, and kind rabbit who gets into all types of situations. He comes up with simple inventions (made out of simple things like leaves and branches) often to help a friend in need.
- Mouse (voiced by Richard Binsley) is a loving and sharing mouse who is Rabbit's sidekick and also gets into situations which fit him and Rabbit. He is also aquaphobic, which means he doesn't like water or swimming. He breaks the fourth wall in every episode.
- Hazel (voiced by Denise Oliver) is a hyperactive acorn-loving squirrel who tends to be very busy a lot. She is seen spending time dealing with her acorns. Similar to Mouse, she doesn't like swimming, or else she's a squirrel with a wet tail.
- Thunder (voiced by Jeremy Harris) is an air-headed, clumsy, and shy, but cheerful, friendly, and kindhearted rhinoceros who tends to be a bit "slower" than the others, but loves learning new things. His heart is as huge as he is.
- Jasper (voiced by Milton Barnes) is a laid-back alligator who loves fishing, and acts like everybody's big brother. When the others need help, they usually go to him. He seems to be the most mature and knows many things the others don't. When the others need to know something, they often go to him for sage advice.
- The Gibble Goose Girls are a quartet of goslings that go and do everything together. Their names are Coral, Amber, Jade and Pearl (voiced by Nissae Isen, Isabel De Carteret, Hanna Endicott-Douglas, and Camden Angelis). They always stick together, and are rarely seen alone. They look, act, and even sound the same. They are inseparable. None of the girls can actually fly because they are too young.
- Edweena (voiced by Stacey DePass) is a cheerful, friendly, and kindhearted elephant who acts like everybody's big sister. Similar to Thunder, she is a gentle giant who looks out for everyone.

== Episodes ==
All episodes are directed by Jason Groh.

No.	Title	Written by	Original release date	Prod. code
1	"Little Dutch Rabbit"	Written by : Karen Moonah; Storyboarded by : Dimitrije Kostic	February 25, 2008	101
1	"Fishing for the Moon"	Written by : Katherine Sandford; Storyboarded by : James Caswell	February 25, 2008	101
Little Dutch Rabbit: When Rabbit gets a bad itch, he removes a stick from a dam to scratch it. Fishing for the Moon: While out at night, Rabbit notices the moon is missing.
2	"Follow the Leader"	Written by : Clive Endersby; Storyboarded by : Luisito G. Escauriaga	March 2, 2008	105
2	"Chasing Rainbows"	Written by : Karen Moonah; Storyboarded by : Mike MacDougall	March 2, 2008	105
Follow the Leader: Rabbit asks Mouse to play follow the leader with him. Chasing Rainbows: Rabbit wants Mouse to play with him on a rainy day, but Mouse hates getting wet.
3	"Mouse's Moss"	Written by : Katherine Sandford; Storyboarded by : Shane Doyle	February 27, 2008	103
3	"The Sound of Silence"	Written by : Clive Endersby; Storyboarded by : James Caswell	February 27, 2008	103
Mouse's Moss: While Mouse is taking a nap with his favorite cuddle moss, Mossy, Rabbit and Thunder have fun with a flippy device. The Sound of Silence: Mouse and Rabbit notice Jasper standing completely still and silent.
4	"Hazel's Big Surprise"	Written by : Katherine Sanford; Storyboarded by : Luisito G. Escauriaga	February 28, 2008	104
4	"The Last Leaf"	Written by : Karen Moonah; Storyboarded by : Mike MacDougall	February 28, 2008	104
Hazel's Big Surprise: Hazel has gathered, polished and stored all the acorns in the area. The Last Leaf: Rabbit creates an exciting new device called a Snow Snapper and he can't wait to try it out.
5	"A Gift to Last"	Written by : Clive Endersby; Storyboarded by : Shane Doyle	February 26, 2008	102
5	"The Big 'To Do"	Written by : Karen Moonah; Storyboarded by : James Caswell	February 26, 2008	102
A Gift to Last: When Mouse and Rabbit learn that it's Jasper's birthday, they think hard about what they could get him for a gift. The Big 'To Do: Rabbit, Mouse and the Gibble Goose Girls all want to go swimming.
6	"Muddy Puddle"	Written by : Clive Endersby; Storyboarded by : Mike MacDougall	March 12, 2008	109
6	"Silly Pilly"	Written by : Katherine Sandford; Storyboarded by : Luisito G. Escauriaga	March 12, 2008	109
Muddy Puddle: Rabbit and Mouse end up stuck in a mud puddle and after calling for help, their friends get stuck too. Silly Pilly: Rabbit wants to perform a special move he developed called the Triple Bipple Backwards Flipple, but can't because there's a caterpillar on his head.
7	"Nest Quest"	Written by : Jeff Sweeney; Storyboarded by : Shane Doyle	April 18, 2008	113
7	"Bouncy Bog"	Written by : Cathy Moss; Storyboarded by : James Caswell	April 18, 2008	113
Nest Quest: The Gibble-Goose Girls' nest is bounced away and so they need a new nest. Bouncy Bog: Mouse and Rabbit find a bouncy bog and are delighted at the idea of sharing with Thunder.
8	"Branching Out"	Written by : Steve Westren; Storyboarded by : Mike MacDougall	March 3, 2008	106
8	"The Willow Pond Wackadoo"	Written by : Jeff Sweeney; Storyboarded by : Dimitrije Kostic	March 3, 2008	106
Branching Out: When wind blows a tree in front of the entrance to Rabbit's sleeping hole, his friends invite him to spend the night at their places. The Willow Pond Wackadoo: When Rabbit, Mouse and Thunder are bored and hot, Thunder tells them a story to cool them down.
9	"I'm Rabbit! I'm Rabbit!"	Written by : Cathy Moss; Storyboarded by : Shane Doyle	March 4, 2008	107
9	"Bogged in Fog"	Written by : Steve Westren; Storyboarded by : James Caswell	March 4, 2008	107
I'm Rabbit! I'm Rabbit!: Rabbit and the others start to hear their echoes for the first time. Bogged in Fog: Rabbit and Mouse head off to see Jasper, who says that he has a big surprise for them.
10	"Strange Bee-haviour"	Written by : Karen Moonah; Storyboarded by : Luisito G. Escauriaga	March 5, 2008	108
10	"The Flighty Fly"	Written by : Cathy Moss; Storyboarded by : Mike MacDougall	March 5, 2008	108
Strange Bee-haviour: Mouse is trying to tell his friends a story about a bat named Batilda. The Flighty Fly: Rabbit invents a new toy called the Flighty Fly.
11	"Hazel's Voice"	Written by : Steve Westren; Storyboarded by : Shane Doyle	April 5, 2008	110
11	"The Perfect Rock"	Written by : Katherine Sandford; Storyboarded by : James Caswell	April 5, 2008	110
Hazel's Voice: Hazel has a sore throat. The Perfect Rock: Thunder thinks he has found the perfect rock to add to his collection.
12	"Thunder the Poet"	Written by : Karen Moonah; Storyboarded by : Luisito G. Escauriaga	April 6, 2008	111
12	"The Strawberry Patch"	Written by : Cathy Moss; Storyboarded by : Mike MacDougall	April 6, 2008	111
Thunder the Poet: The Strawberry Patch: Thunder forgets a poem he made up. Mouse wants to retrieve strawberries from behind a prickly hedge to surprise Rabbit.
13	"A Sticky Situation"	Written by : Karen Moonah; Storyboarded by : Shane Doyle	April 12, 2008	112
13	"Ladybug Day"	Written by : Jeff Sweeney; Storyboarded by : James Caswell	April 12, 2008	112
A Sticky Situation: Ladybug Day: Rabbit and Mouse get their paws stuck to a stick covered with pine sap. The animals try to celebrate Ladybug Day by throwing a party for a bunch of the insects.
14	"The Greatest Invention"	Written by : Jeff Sweeney; Storyboarded by : Luisito G. Escauriaga	May 23, 2008	114
14	"Turtle in a Hurry"	Written by : Steve Westren; Storyboarded by : Mike MacDougall	May 23, 2008	114
The Greatest Invention: Jasper claims that his fishing stick is the Greatest Invention. Rabbit has a hard time believing it until the fishing stick helps rescue Amber from a mud puddle, allows Hazel and Edweena to sing together, shields Mouse from the rain, retrieves lost property and serves as a Friend Keeper. Turtle in a Hurry: Rabbit and Mouse enlist the aid of their friends in order to help 'Logan' a young turtle reach the 'Turtle Jolly Jumbo Jamboree' in time to compete in the amazing Turtle Jolly Jumbo Jamboree jiggle-jog race.
15	"A Private Place"	Written by : Jeff Sweeney; Storyboarded by : James Caswell	July 11, 2008	115
15	"My Droopy Friend"	Written by : Ann MacNaughton; Storyboarded by : Shane Doyle	July 11, 2008	115
A Private Place: When the friends learn that Edweena has a private place where she goes to be alone, they all decide they want one two. But soon they discover that finding a suitable, enjoyable and comfortable 'private place' is not as easy as it seems. My Droopy Friend: When Mouse plants a sunflower seed, he discovers that Sunflowers need both sun and water to grow. With the help of his friends, Mouse helps the drooping Sunflower to become perky and learns that plants often thrive best in their natural environment.
16	"Pearl's Pals"	Written by : Katherine Sandford; Storyboarded by : Dimitrije Kostic	July 18, 2008	116
16	"For the Birds"	Written by : Steve Westren; Storyboarded by : Luisito G. Escauriaga	July 18, 2008	116
Pearl's Pals: When Pearl becomes fascinated by a school of tadpoles, the other Gibble Goose Girls have to adjust their morning walk routine -- luckily they find a new leader, Mouse! Meanwhile, Pearl learns a new move from the GGG's swim-dance from her tadpole friends. For the Birds: When Edweena wants to make friends with a flock of pretty yellow songbirds, she enlists the help of the gang to teach her different friend-making strategies, but finally finds the best way on her own.
17	"Hazel's Noise"	Written by : Ann MacNaughton; Storyboarded by : Shane Doyle	July 26, 2008	117
17	"Don't Touch Mossy"	Written by : Karen Moonah; Storyboarded by : James Caswell	July 26, 2008	117
Hazel's Noise: Rabbit, Mouse and Thunder help Hazel find the source of an irritating noise. Don't Touch Mossy: Mouse's mossy becomes muddy and damp.
18	"Mouse's Mountain"	Written by : Katherine Sandford; Storyboarded by : Lusiito G. Escauriaga	July 27, 2008	118
18	"You Be Me"	Written by : Jeff Sweeney; Storyboarded by : Mike MacDougall	July 27, 2008	118
Mouse's Mountain: Mouse wants to climb Big Mountain. You Be Me: Mouse and Thunder decide to change places for the day.
19	"Gibble Goose Girls Galore"	Written by : Ann MacNaughton; Storyboarded by : Shane Doyle	July 29, 2008	119
19	"Scaredy Skunk"	Written by : Steve Westren; Storyboarded by : James Caswell	July 29, 2008	119
Gibble Goose Girls Galore: The Gibble Goose Girls find it difficult to dance together when they misunderstand Rabbit's complements and think that their step is the best. But by watching Rabbit and Mouse work together to create fantastic 'stump-jumps' they realize that only by practicing, being open to suggestions and working together can they improve on their individual move. Scaredy Skunk: Mouse and Rabbit are playing with Edweena when they meet a little skunk named Fowler. They invite Fowler to join them, but it turns out Edweena's afraid of Fowler, and Fowler's afraid of Edweena. Mouse and Rabbit realize the best way for the two to get over their fear of each other is to learn all about each other.
20	"Edweena's New Friend"	Written by : Katherine Sandford; Storyboarded by : Luisito G. Escauriaga	August 8, 2008	120
20	"The Big Goose"	Written by : Ann McNaughton; Storyboarded by : Mike MacDougall	August 8, 2008	120
Edweena's New Friend: When Edweena's new friend Lexi has to hibernate, Mouse, Rabbit and Jasper help her say goodbye. The Big Goose: All the Gibble Goose Girls, especially Jade, are entranced by the new goose in town.
21	"The Mysterious Acorn Mystery"	Written by : Ann MacNaughton; Storyboarded by : Shane Doyle	October 19, 2008	121
21	"Frog on a Log"	Written by : Steve Westren; Storyboarded by : James Caswell	October 19, 2008	121
The Mysterious Acorn Mystery: Hazel, Rabbit and Mouse are totally confused when Hazel's acorns disappear from one place and appear in another. Frog on a Log: Emmett, a large Bullfrog has decided to make his home in the pond.
22	"The Hoppiest Wish"	Written by : Katherine Sandford; Storyboarded by : Dimitrie Kostic	October 25, 2008	122
22	"Mouse’s Mysterious Something"	Written by : Jeff Sweeney; Storyboarded by : Mike MacDougall	October 25, 2008	122
The Hoppiest Wish: When Mouse wishes to be The Hoppiest Hopper, his friends work together to think of some imaginative hop helpers to aid him in getting his wish. Mouse’s Mysterious Something: Mouse finds a mysterious something on the beach.
23	"Catch Me If You Can"	Written by : Steve Westren; Storyboarded by : Shane Doyle	October 26, 2008	123
23	"The Snow Geese"	Written by : Ann MacNaughton; Storyboarded by : James Caswell	October 26, 2008	123
Catch Me If You Can: Thunder is trying to help Hazel catch acorns before they roll into the creek. The Snow Geese: The Gibble Goose Girls are having a tough time adapting to their first winter.
24	"Honey and Berries"	Written by : Jeff Sweeney; Storyboarded by : Luisito G. Escauriaga	October 26, 2008	124
24	"Birthday Mousey"	Written by : Ann MacNaughton; Storyboarded by : Mike MacDougall	October 26, 2008	124
Honey and Berries: After Mouse and Rabbit accidentally eat all of Hazel’s blueberries, they realize saying sorry may not be enough. Birthday Mousey: Rabbit makes Mouse an unexpected birthday gift.
25	"Sing a Song"	Written by : Clive Endersby; Storyboarded by : Shane Doyle	November 1, 2008	125
25	"Snowed Under"	Written by : Clive Endersby; Storyboarded by : James Caswell	November 1, 2008	125
Sing a Song: An Arctic Tern named Tommy crash lands in a tree in the forest. Snowed Under: When a snow covered branch falls, Hazel’s winter store of acorns are dislodged and bounce everywhere.
26	"Jasper's Frozen Smarts"	Written by : Katherine Sandford; Storyboarded by : Luisito G. Escauriaga	November 2, 2008	126
26	"Thunder's Idea Maker"	Written by : Ann MacNaughton; Storyboarded by : Mike MacDougall	November 2, 2008	126
Jasper's Frozen Smarts: Mouse becomes convinced that Jasper’s mind must have frozen in the cold. Thunder's Idea Maker: Thunder figures out a good way to get unstuck from the knothole.

Awards
Preceded by The Three Pigs	Caldecott Medal recipient 2003	Succeeded by The Man Who Walked Between the Towers
