= The Best We Could Do =

Illustrated memoir by Thi Bui

- First edition (publ. Abrams Books)
- Author: Thi Bui
- Language: English
- Publication date: 2017

The Best We Could Do is a 2017 illustrated memoir written by Thi Bui. It chronicles Thi Bui's parents' life before and during the Vietnam War, their escape from Vietnam when Bui was a child, and their eventual migration to the United States as refugees. The novel was published on March 7, 2017.

== Background ==
The idea for the novel began when Bui was working on her Master's thesis and conducted oral history interviews with her parents. According to Bui, under the umbrella of academic work and oral history, she began having long and difficult conversations with her parents about topics that were uncomfortable for them to share. Bui shared her family's history in the thesis project, but that work was ultimately only available to her family and her graduate school advisor and peers. She wanted to share her work on a larger scale. For the next ten years, she trained herself to draw comics and developed the novel. Bui claims she was inspired by other autobiographical graphic novels like Art Spiegelman's Maus and Marjane Satrapi's Persepolis.

== Themes ==
The novel touches on many themes, including family, parenthood, belonging, the meaning of home, and the importance of education.

It also touches on important themes such as historical memory and narrative. In telling her parents' story, Bui offers a different narrative about the Vietnam War from the one usually seen in American films and textbooks. Bui also focuses on how members of her family will remember the same events differently, and the differences can be based on the person's gender, class, politics, life experiences, etc. Bui has publicly stated that it is important to her and her family that the novel be "good for the Vietnamese people," and that motivated her parents to reveal their hardships in the novel.

The novel is an autobiography and a refugee story, and in interviews Bui has expressed her thoughts on contemporary immigration issues in the United States and how important narrative and storytelling are to humanize immigrants.

== Reception ==
The Best We Could Do has earned starred reviews. Publishers Weekly says, "Bui transmutes the base metal of war into gold...", and the Library Journal cautions readers, "Be prepared to take your heart on an emotional roller-coaster..."

It has also earned positive reviews in other journalistic sources. Abraham Riesman, writing for news site Vulture, praises Bui's prose and claims, “I set out to dog-ear every brilliant piece of compact phrasing; my book is now twice as thick on the top as it is on the bottom.” The Best We Could Do is on lists like The Washington Post's "The 10 Best Graphic Novels of 2017" and The Cut's "6 Graphic Novels to Make You Cry," and Bill Gates' "5 Amazing Books I Read This Year."

The Best We Could Do won the American Book Award and was nominated for the 2017 National Book Critics Circle Award in the autobiography genre. It made it to the top 30 finalists in the latter. The novel also received an Eisner Award nomination.

The book has also been well received by universities across the United States. It was the 2017-2018 Common Book at UCLA and the 2018-2019 Common Book at the University of Oregon.

The Best We Could Do has been so well received Bui has even had offers for film rights, but she has declined all of them. Bui does not trust a movie to represent her family's Vietnamese-American experience, because there are "too many bad Vietnam War movies out there". Hollywood would have to hire more Vietnamese actors and change the ways it represents Asian and Vietnamese people before she would consider selling the film rights.

== Awards ==
2017 National Book Critics Circle Award Finalist

2018 American Library Association Notable Books Selection

2018 American Book Award
