= Keiko Kasza =

Japanese American author and illustrator

Keiko Kasza is a Japanese American picture book author and illustrator. Her works have been translated into multiple languages and feature animals as main characters.

== Life and career ==
Kasza was born on December 23, 1951, in Innoshima City, Japan, to parents Tomizo Tanaka, a businessman, and Masuko Tanaka, a homemaker. She lived with and grew up in an extended family, along with her parents, two brothers and grandparents. She left Japan to attend California State University at Northridge in the U.S., graduating in 1975 with a bachelor's degree in graphic design. After her 1976 marriage to Gregory J. Kasza, an American citizen and college professor, she moved permanently to the U.S. She originally worked as a graphic designer after graduating from college, while creating children's books as a hobby. She first began writing children's books as a hobby when she and her husband were living in Ecuador.

Kasza published her first book in 1981, released in Japan. Her first published work in the United States was the children's book, The Wolf's Chicken Stew (1987). It won a Kentucky Bluegrass Award in 1989. Kasza won a Prix Chronos for her 1995 book, Grandpa Toad's Secrets.

In 1997, Kasza's book A Mother for Choco was recorded on a mini-album called "Completely Yours: A Complete Mini-Album of Story, Rhymes, and Songs", released on CD and cassette. The story and various nursery rhymes were performed by a cast that included Paula Poundstone as narrator, Bea Arthur as Mrs. Walrus and Mary Tyler Moore as Mrs. Bear.

Kasza has translated some of her own books into Japanese. She lives in Bloomington, Indiana, with her husband. They have two sons.

== Style of work ==
Kasza creates children's books that feature animal characters and she often uses "humor and poignancy" in her work. She has said many of her story ideas are based on childhood memories. Her book Dorothy and Mikey was inspired by a memory that Kasza had of playing hide-and-seek as a child and worrying she might never be found. Kasza frequently illustrates with pen, ink and watercolor. The Oxford Encyclopedia of Children's Literature commented that "Kasza's expressive ink-and-watercolor scenes are characteristically accompanied by simple narration and surrounded with ample white space; her stories often conclude with a humorous twist or sight gag."

== Works ==
- The Wolf's Chicken Stew (1987)
- The Pigs' Picnic (1988)
- A Mother for Choco (1992)
- The Rat and the Tiger (1993)
- Grandpa Toad's Secrets (1995)
- When the Elephant Walks (1997)
- Don't Laugh, Joe! (1997)
- Dorothy and Mikey (2000)
- The Mightiest (2001)
- My Lucky Day (2003)
- The Dog Who Cried Wolf (2005)
- Badger's Fancy Meal (2007)
- Ready for Anything! (2009)
- Silly Goose's Big Story (2012)
- My Lucky Birthday (2013)
- Finders Keepers (2015)

== Awards and honors ==
- 1987 – Notable Book, American Library Association for The Wolf's Chicken Stew
- 1989 – Kentucky Bluegrass Award for The Wolf's Chicken Stew
- 1997 – Prix Chronos for Grandpa Toad's Secrets
- 1998 – Charlotte Zolotow Honor Book for Don't Laugh, Joe!
- Indiana Young Hoosier Book Award for A Mother for Choco
