= A Different Pond =

2017 picture book by Bao Phi and illustrated by Thi Bui

- Cover of the picture book
- Author: Bao Phi
- Illustrator: Thi Bui
- Language: English
- Genre: Children's
- Publisher: Capstone Publishers
- Publication date: August 1, 2017
- Publication place: United States
- Website: Capstone Page

A Different Pond is a 2017 children's picture book by Bao Phi, illustrated by Thi Bui. The book tells the story of a boy and his father going fishing. Phi created the book because of his desire to have books about people like himself to read to his daughter. Bui's detailed illustrations allowed Phi to remove elements of the prose. Bui, who had never illustrated a traditional picture book before, won praise for her use of colors and was recognized with a 2018 Caldecott Honor. The book received positive reviews and appeared on best of 2017 book lists.

== Plot ==
A boy goes fishing early one Saturday morning with his father, who immigrated to the United States after the Vietnam War. The family depends on catching food to have enough to eat. After they catch a fish, the two return home so that the boy's father can go to work. The boy knows that that night for dinner they will eat the fish they've caught.

== Background ==
Author Bao Phi had wanted more diverse books to read to his daughter. He decided to adapt an unpublished poem of his into a children's picture book because he thought that there were few picture books that deal directly with the struggles of Southeast Asian refugees in America. Following a blog post he wrote about another one its titles, Capstone Publishers reached out to Phi to ask him to submit a children's book; he then shared with them the "script" to A Different Pond.

After seeing Thi Bui's illustrations, Phi was struck by their beauty and power and decided to remove some of the writing, thinking that the pictures served to describe what he was feeling. Bui was excited to illustrate the book because the similarity between Bui and Phi allowed her to tap into her own immigrant experience.

She also asked Phi for details of his childhood so she could capture them in her illustrations. She was inspired by Maurice Sendak's In the Night Kitchen. Bui had never drawn for a picture book before, nor had she drawn in full color before, and was struck by having to draw at a level of detail unlike her graphic novels, though she was relieved by its brevity as compared to her 300-page memoir. To overcome this she digitally experimented with colors and textures.

The book was published on August 1, 2017, by Capstone.

== Writing and illustrations ==
While the story is about a specific Southeast Asian family it also contains more universal elements. The background of the family being refugees due to the Vietnam War, which the father is unable to speak about, is a powerful force in the story, although refugee status is not explicitly stated. The family's poverty is also a major feature. These are referenced through things such as a bologna sandwich the father and son eat while fishing, and the boy's wondering why they need to catch fish to eat when his father works two jobs. The father acts as an excellent parent, working to make life better for his son while also mentoring, guiding, and providing a loving home for him, which helps him mature and grow.

The book could seem, in the words of the Kirkus review, "melancholy", but the way the words and pictures work together instead creates a "gentle[r]" feel. Bui's background in cartoons and elements of graphic novels, helps to capture the mood and feel of the text. For instance, the use of frames helps to keep the story focused on the present even as it flashes back to the past. In the words of Anna Haase Krueger writing for School Library Journal, "The text placement and composition of the illustrations allow each occurrence or observation to be its own distinct event, stringing together the small, discrete moments that make up a life, a memory, and a history into a cohesive whole." Bui's use of blues and the way she contrasts them with other colors such as reds and oranges, drew particular praise. Also drawing praise was the cover illustration which served to both draw readers in and encapsulate the story.

== Reception ==
The book was well received. It earned starred reviews from Booklist, where reviewer Sarah Hunter described the book as a "wistful, beautifully illustrated story" and recognised the applicability of its central theme to immigrant families, and to struggling families generally; author Minh Lê, writing for The Horn Book Magazine, praised the "powerfully understated picture book" and recognized its ability to shift the focus of the refugee narrative from the painful journey to the reality awaiting the family members once they reach their destination. Kirkus Reviews; Publishers Weekly; and School Library Journal. The book was also named in many end of year best children's books lists including by The Washington Post, the HuffPost, The Boston Globe, Kirkus Reviews, Publishers Weekly, the New York Public Library, the Chicago Public Library and as an ALA Notable book which summarized, "In this gentle, honest tale of immigrant survival, a young Vietnamese American boy and his father go on an early morning fishing trip."

The book was awarded a Caldecott Honor with the committee praising the book for the way it uses a, "cinematic experience, powerfully capturing facial expressions, mood, and quiet moments" to portray the book's themes. The book was also awarded a Boston Globe–Horn Book Honor. In her acceptance speech Bui praised Phi saying he had "one of the biggest hearts I’ve ever met and bravely wearing it openly for everyone to see and learn from. I’m so glad we got to make this book together".
