= Melissa Stewart =

American author of children's books

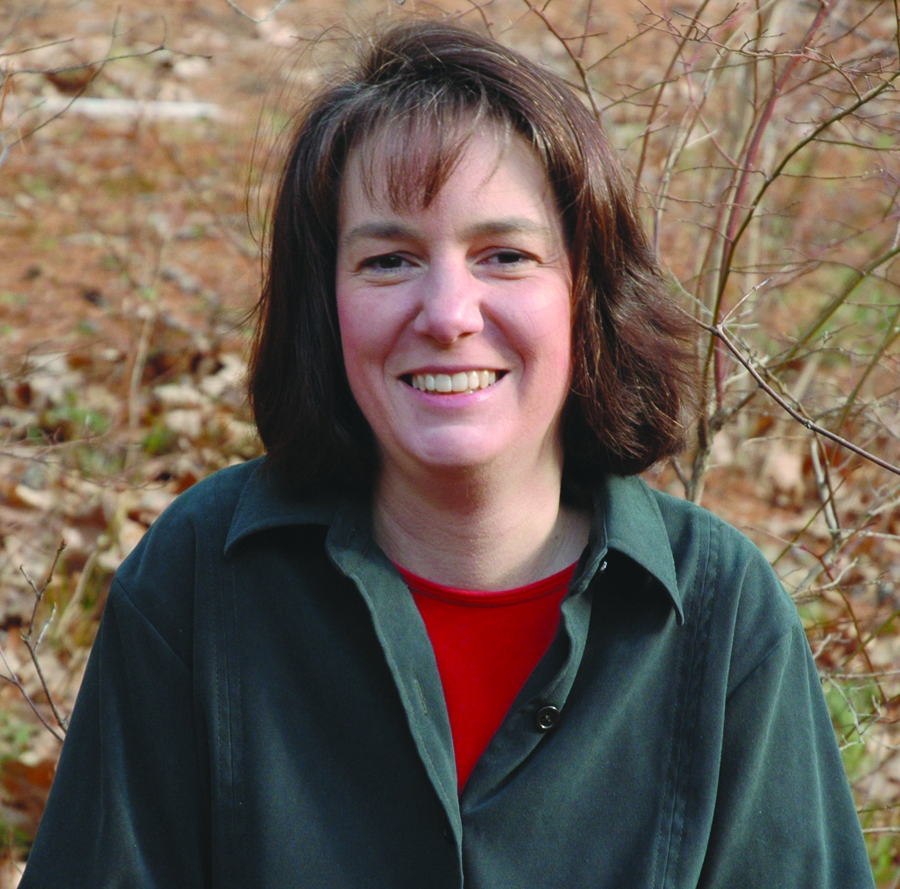
- Melissa Stewart
- Education: Union College; New York University
- Occupation: Author
- Writing career
- Notable awards: Cybils Award (2015); Robert F. Sibert Informational Book Honor (2022)

Melissa Stewart is an American author of children's books about science and nature and a leading researcher in the field of nonfiction literature for young people. She has published more than 200 books for children as well as several books for educators.

== Early life and education ==
Stewart grew up in Massachusetts and attended Hampshire Regional High School. She received a Bachelor's degree in biology from Union College and a master's degree in science journalism from New York University.

== Career ==
Following graduation, she worked as an editor of high school science textbooks for a small book packager in New York City. Later, she moved to Connecticut and edited traditional nonfiction science books for Franklin Press and Children's Press, two imprints owned by Grolier/Hachette and then Scholastic.

During this period, she also worked as a freelance science writer, publishing dozens of magazine articles for children and adults. Her first book, Life without Light: A Journey to Earth's Dark Ecosystems was published in 1998 and was named a New York Public Library Best Book for Teens.

In 2000, she returned to Massachusetts and began writing articles and books full-time. Most of her early books were traditional nonfiction titles for the school and library market. Her first picture book, A Place for Butterflies, was published in 2006 and received the Green Earth Book Award. It has been revised twice and sold more than 350,000 copies. Since then, Melissa has published 25 expository literature picture books as well as traditional, browsable, and active nonfiction titles. Her books have been translated into more than a dozen languages.

She also co-authored, with educator Nancy Chesley, Perfect Pairs: Using Fiction & Nonfiction Picture Books to Teach Life Science, K-2 and Perfect Pairs: Using Fiction & Nonfiction Picture Books to Teach Life Science, Grades 3-5.

In 2012, she began researching nonfiction literature for young people and, in 2017, developed the Nonfiction Family Tree, which evolved into the 5 Kinds of Nonfiction classification system and was fully described in 5 Kinds of Nonfiction: Enriching Reading and Writing Instruction with Children's Books, co-written by educator Marlene Correia. (,) She also edited the anthology Nonfiction Writers Dig Deep: 50 Award-winning Authors Share the Secret of Engaging Writing and co-authored the Position Statement on the Role of Nonfiction Literature, K-12, which was adopted by the National Council of Teachers of English in 2023.

Her essays, articles, and op-eds on nonfiction literature and literacy have appeared in Book Links, Booklist, Children and Libraries, Knowledge Quest, Language Arts, Publishers Weekly, Reading Rockets, The Reading Teacher, School Library Connection, School Library Journal, Science, Science & Children, The Utah Journal of Literacy, and The Washington Post.

== Awards and honors ==
Fifteen of Stewart's books are Junior Library Guild selections: Under the Snow (2009), No Monkeys, No Chocolate (2013), Feathers: Not Just for Flying (2014), Zoom In on Grasshoppers (2015), Las Serpientes (Snakes) (2016), A Seed is the Start (2019), Los Animales Más Mortales (Deadliest Animals), Seashells (2019), Summertime Sleepers (2021), Fourteen Monkeys (2021), Tree Hole Homes (2022),Mega-Predators of the Past (2022), Meet the Mini-Mammals (2025),From Bam! to Burp! A Carbon Atom’s Never-ending Journey through Space and Time and YOU (2025), and Monarch to Mourning Cloak: A Butterfly Journal.

The Bulletin of the Center for Children's Books included Feathers: Not Just for Flying in their list of the best books of 2014.

Awards for Stewart's books
Year	Title	Award	Result	Ref.
2007	A Place for Butterflies	Green Earth Book Award	Winner	
2009	Under the Snow	Massachusetts Book Award	Finalist	
2010	National Geographic Readers: Ants	Cybils Award for Easy Readers	Finalist	
2010	A Place for Birds	Green Earth Book Award	Honor	
2010	Under the Snow	California Eureka! Book Award	Honor	
2010	Under the Snow	Charlotte Zolotow Award	Commend	
2011	A Place for Frogs	Green Earth Book Award	Honor	
2012	A Place for Bats	American Academy of Arts and Sciences/Subaru Prize for Excellence in Science Books	Finalist	
2012	A Place for Bats	Correll Book Award for Excellence in Informational Text	Winner	
2013	A Place for Bats	Green Earth Book Award	Honor	
2013	A Place for Turtles	Massachusetts Book Award	Finalist	
2013	A Place for Turtles	Sigurd Olson Nature Writing Award for Children's Literature	Winner	
2014	Beneath the Sun	Charlotte Zolotow Award	Commend	
2014	Feathers: Not Just for Flying	Cybils Award for Elementary and Middle Grade	Winner	
2014	No Monkeys, No Chocolate	Cook Prize for Best STEM Picture Book	Finalist	
2014	A Place for Turtles	Green Earth Book Award	Winner	
2015	Feathers: Not Just for Flying	Association for Library Service to Children Notable Children's Books	Selection	
2015	Feathers: Not Just for Flying	John Burroughs Riverby Award	Winner	
2017	Droughts	American Association for the Advancement of Science/Subaru Prize for Excellence in Science Books	Finalist	
2018	Can an Aardvark Bark?	Colorado Book Awards	Winner	
2018	Pipsqueaks, Slowpokes, and Stinkers: Celebrating Animal Underdogs	California Eureka! Book Award	Winner	
2018	Pipsqueaks, Slowpokes, and Stinkers: Celebrating Animal Underdogs	Massachusetts Book Award	Honor	
2018	Pipsqueaks, Slowpokes, and Stinkers: Celebrating Animal Underdogs	Pennsylvania Keystone to Reading Book Award	Finalist	
2018	Pipsqueaks, Slowpokes, and Stinkers: Celebrating Animal Underdogs	SCBWI Golden Kite Award	Honor	
2019	Seashells: More Than a Home	Cybils Award for Elementary	Finalist	
2019	Seashells: More Than a Home	Pennsylvania Keystone to Reading Book Award	Finalist	
2020	Seashells: More Than a Home	Correll Book Award for Excellence in Informational Text	Winner	
2021	Fourteen Monkeys: A Rain Forest Rhyme	California Eureka Book Award	Honor	
2022	Fourteen Monkeys: A Rain Forest Rhyme	Washington State Towner Book Award	Honor	
2022	Summertime Sleepers	Association for Library Service to Children Notable Children's Books	Selection	
2022	Summertime Sleepers	Pennsylvania Keystone to Reading Book Award	Finalist	
2022	Summertime Sleepers	Robert F. Sibert Informational Book Award	Honor	
2023	Summertime Sleepers: Animals that Estivate	Oklahoma Donna Norvell Award	Winner	
2023	Whale Fall: Exploring an Ocean-floor Ecosystem	American Association for the Advancement of Science/Subaru Prize for Excellence in Science Books	Winner	
2024	Tree Hole Homes: Daytime Dens and Nighttime Nooks	Yellowstone Jackhammer Picture Book Award	Finalist	
2024	Whale Fall: Exploring an Ocean-floor Ecosystem	Association for Library Service to Children Notable Children's Books	Selection	
