= Eric Rohmann =

American children's author and illustrator (born 1957)

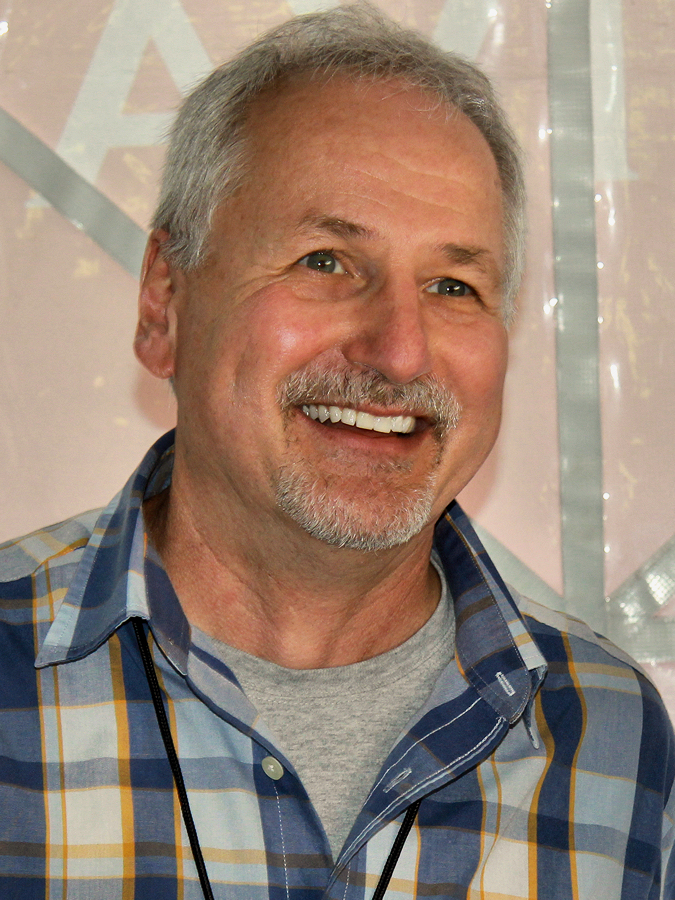
- Rohmann at the 2012 Texas Book Festival
- Born: 1957 (age 68–69); Riverside, Illinois, U.S.
- Occupations: Author, illustrator
- Writing career
- Period: 1994–present
- Genre: Children's picture books
- Notable works: My Friend Rabbit; Time Flies
- Notable awards: Caldecott Medal; 2003

Eric Rohmann (born October 26, 1957) is an American author and illustrator of children's books. He is a graduate of Illinois State University and Arizona State University. He won the 2003 Caldecott Medal for U.S. picture book illustration, recognizing My Friend Rabbit, and he was a runner-up in 1995 for Time Flies. Rohmann also won the Sibert Medal as the illustrator (with his wife, Candace Fleming, as the author), for Honeybee: The Busy Life of Apis Mellifera.

In 2015, he created a popular series based on a bulldozer that began with Bulldozer’s Big Day.

== Selected works ==
- Time Flies (1994)
- The Cinder-Eyed Cats (2001)
- My Friend Rabbit (2002)
- Pumpkinhead (2003)
- Clara and Asha (2005)
- A Kitten Tale (2008)
- Last Song (2010)
- Bone Dog (2011)
- Oh, No! (2012) (Illustrator)
- A Kitten Tale (2012)
- Bless This Mouse (2015) (Illustrator)
- Bulldozer's Big Day (2015) (Illustrator)
- Bulldozer Helps Out (2017) (Illustrator)
- Honeybee: The Busy Life of Apis Mellifera (2020) (Illustrator)

== Personal life ==
Rohmann was raised one of three children and currently lives and works in Illinois. He was not a big reader as a child, instead seeing the world in images. Rohmann is married to Candace Fleming and the couple have collaborated on projects including Oh, No!. He is partial to coffee, popcorn, and Delacroix’s The Death of Sardanapalus.
