= Dark Emperor & Other Poems of the Night =

2010 children's poetry book by Joyce Sidman and Rick Allen

- Author: Joyce Sidman
- Illustrator: Rick Allen
- Language: English
- Genre: Nonfiction
- Publisher: Houghton Mifflin Books for Children
- Publication date: 2010
- Publication place: United States
- Media type: Print
- Pages: 32 pp
- ISBN: 0547152280

Dark Emperor & Other Poems of The Night is a children's poetry book by Joyce Sidman and illustrated by Rick Allen. This book was a Newbery Honor book in 2011.

== Plot ==
“Dark Emperor & Other Poems of The Night” is a nonfiction compilation of poems about animals that are active during the night time. The author Joyce Sidman reveals the loveliness and diversification of the nocturnal world through twelve lyrical poems. Each poem has an illustration of the environment of which it describes and provides a sidebar of factual information about the animals mentioned in the poem. These poems are educational and fun for children because they are being provided with information about nature through art. The purpose of this book is not to be read straight through but to study the words and drawings. The illustration goes perfect with the text, allowing children to go far into their imagination. This award-winning book is a great way for children to learn about creatures who prefer the night time.

== Poems ==
- "Welcome To The Night"
- "Snail At Moonrise"
- "Love Poem Of The Primrose Moth"
- "Dark Emperor"
- "Oak After Dark"
- "Night-Spider's Advice"
- "I Am A Baby Porcupette"
- "Cricket Speaks"
- "The Mushrooms Come"
- "Ballad of The Wandering Eft"
- "Bat Wraps Up"
- "Moon's Lament"

== Awards ==
Newbery Honor Book in 2011

== Critical reception ==
To Susan Dove Lempke in the Horn Book Magazine, Sidman "highlights not just random facts but small nuggets of information that catch the imagination". Publishers Weekly says "In Sidman's delicious poems, darkness is the norm, and there's nothing to fear but the rising sun". Margaret Bush of School Library Journal says “Sidman continues her explorations of natural history in this set of poems about nocturnal life in the forest. As in her other collections, each selection is set in an expansive spread that includes a factual discussion of the featured subject. The illustrations are bold, richly detailed linoleum prints colored in gouache.” Hazel Rochman of Booklist adds that “this picture book combines lyrical poetry and compelling art with science concepts.”

== See also ==
- Children's Literature
