= Big Cat, Little Cat =

2017 picture book by Elisha Cooper

- Author: Elisha Cooper
- Illustrator: Elisha Cooper
- Genre: Picture book
- Publisher: Roaring Brook Press, Macmillan Books
- Publication date: March 14, 2017
- Publication place: US
- Media type: Print (paperback)
- Pages: unpaged (32)
- Awards: Caldecott Honor; Charlotte Zolotow Award (Highly Commended)
- ISBN: 978-1-62672-371-9
- OCLC: 1023776336
- Website: elishacooper.com

Big Cat, Little Cat (stylized as BIG CAT, little cat) is a 2017 children's picture book written by Elisha Cooper. It was published by Roaring Brook Press, a subsidiary of Macmillan Books. In the story, a large, white cat welcomes a new black cat into a family. The white cat then dies, and the cycle begins anew when the family adopts a new kitten. Cooper was inspired to write the story after his family experienced a similar situation. Critics praised his illustrations, for their ability to help further the story's messages and themes. These monochromatic illustrations were different than the style Cooper normally employed when illustrating a book. The book was well-reviewed, and received a 2018 Caldecott Honor.

== Plot ==
An older white cat is a family's sole companion until it is joined by a younger black cat. The white cat welcomes the black cat. Over the course of the story, the two cats age, until the white cat dies. The white cat is mourned by the family and the black cat, until one day a new white kitten joins the family.

== Background and publication ==
Cooper was inspired to write the book based on experiences in his life. He had grown up on a farm, and had thus been familiar with animals "cycling through". As an adult, Cooper and his family adopted two cats. A couple of years after the adoption, one of them died, and Cooper observed that his daughter was less familiar with death as a child than he had been.

Cooper wrote and illustrated the book simultaneously, saying "I love how words and images play off each other. Like good teammates, who make each other better." He typically illustrates with watercolor pictures, though felt that the subject matter of Big Cat, Little Cat was better-suited to monochrome images. In developing the book, he drew inspiration from Kevin Henkes Caldecott-winning story Kitten's First Full Moon. Big Cat, Little Cat and Kitten's First Full Moon share both subject matter and visual styles. Big Cat, Little Cat was published on March 14, 2017 by Roaring Brook Press, part of the Macmillan Children's Publishing Group.

== Writing and illustrations ==
The book's illustrations could be considered simple yet with a rhythm. The black-and-white illustrations were a change in style for Cooper and were compared in Publishers Weekly to those of a Japanese brush painter. Cooper used thick, bold lines to, in the words of Martha Parravano, writing for The Horn Book Magazine, "produce figures full of kinetic energy and personality". The largely monochromatic drawings were accompanied by a few pages with colored backgrounds, mostly yellow, with one grey. These backgrounds, it was suggested in Kirkus Reviews, reflect the emotional state of the cats.

The text was minimal. The opening lines were specifically quoted in several reviews: "There was a cat // who lived alone. / Until the day // a new cat came." The cats were the focus of the story without losing their feline qualities; "absolutely cat... it stays respectful and non-anthropomorphic", according to Deborah Stevenson, writing in The Bulletin of the Center for Children's Books. The cats' companionship was a key theme of the book, with the friends teaching and learning from one another. The human family in the story, by contrast, is only shown in silhouette. According to critics, Cooper nonetheless manages to effectively convey the feelings of all of the characters. For instance, it is clear how sad both the black cat and the family are after the white cat dies. The themes of loss and the cycle of life are shown through the circular nature of the story. The book has, according to Kirkus Reviews, a "heart-healing message".

== Reception and awards ==
The book received critical praise. Lolly Gepson, writing for Booklist in a starred review, explained that "Cooper certainly loves and understands cat behavior, as exemplified in his various poses of cats at rest and in action. The book also received starred reviews in The Bulletin of the Center for Children's Books, Kirkus Reviews, The Horn Book Magazine, Publishers Weekly, and the School Library Journal, where librarian Paige Mellinger described it as "a gentle, loving look at the life cycle of pets".

The illustrations were recognized with a 2018 Caldecott Honor, with the award committee citing how the book's "[s]imple and joyful domestic routines underscore the deeply entwined lives of two feline companions and the impact of loss on one". The book's writing was "Highly Commended" in 2018 for the Charlotte Zolotow Award of the Cooperative Children's Book Center (CCBC) at the University of Wisconsin–Madison School of Education. According to the CCBC, "Although the premise isn't original, the execution of this picture book is superb."
