= Holly Keller =

American writer

Holly Keller (born 1942) is an American writer and illustrator of children's books.

== Background ==
Holly Keller is an author and illustrator, who is noted for her penchant for creating animal protagonists, which she draws in a minimalist, flat, cartoon style.

== Schooling ==
Keller was born in New York City in 1942, and was a fan of reading from an early age. Drawing also quickly became a form of self entertainment for her. As schooling for Keller continued she went on to Sarah Lawrence College to obtain a degree in history; later attending Columbia University, Keller continued her history studies by earning her master's degree. Holly took courses at the Parsons School of Design when she finally had time and was encouraged by a professor to try illustrating children's books. In 1981, Keller put together a portfolio of her works and submitted it to an editor at the Greenwillow Press, where she was published using her first two books and illustrations; Cromwell's Glasses and Ten Sleepy Sheep.

== Family ==
Keller married in 1963 to a pediatrician and soon became the mother of two children.

== About the books ==
Keller has received numerous awards and recognitions for her work. Her illustration style is characterized by a flat, minimalist, and cartoon-like aesthetic. In addition to their entertainment value, Keller's books frequently address thematic concepts, including adoption, social integration, sibling dynamics, and coping with the loss of a pet.

Her second published children's book, Ten Sleepy Sheep, was selected as a Library of Congress Children's Book of the Year. Beyond her character-driven series focusing on real-world situations, Keller has authored and illustrated several standalone picture books that explore similar developmental themes. Alongside her independent projects, she collaborates as an illustrator for other children's authors, including Paul Showers, Wendy Pfeffer, and Anne Rockwell.

== Awards ==
- Children's Book of the Year, Library of Congress, 1983, for Ten Sleepy Sheep
- Best Book of the Year, School Library Journal, 1984, for Geraldine's Blanket
- Children's Choice and Child Study Association Children's Book of the Year, both 1987, both for Goodbye, Max
- Notable Children's Trade Book in the Field of Social Studies, National Council for the Social Studies/Children's Book Council (NCSS/CBC), 1989, for The Best Present
- Fanfare Honor Book, Horn Book, 1991, for Horace
- Reading Rainbow Review Book, 1991, for Horace
- Pick of the Lists, American Booksellers Association, 1991, for The New Boy
- Pick of the Lists, American Booksellers Association, 1992, for Island Baby
- Pick of the Lists, American Booksellers Association, 1994, for Geraldine's Baby Brother
- Notable Children's Trade Book in the Field of Social Studies, NCSS/CBC, 1994, for Grandfather's Dream
- Charlotte Zolotow Award for Farfallina & Marcel, 2003

== Books ==
For Children; Self-Illustrated

- Cromwell's Glasses, Greenwillow (New York, NY), 1982.
- Ten Sleepy Sheep, Greenwillow (New York, NY), 1983.
- Too Big, Greenwillow (New York, NY), 1983.
- Geraldine's Blanket, Greenwillow (New York, NY), 1984.
- Will It Rain?, Greenwillow (New York, NY), 1984.
- Henry's Fourth of July, Greenwillow (New York, NY), 1985.
- When Francie Was Sick, Greenwillow (New York, NY), 1985.
- A Bear for Christmas, Greenwillow (New York, NY), 1986.
- Lizzie's Invitation, Greenwillow (New York, NY), 1987.
- Goodbye, Max, Greenwillow (New York, NY), 1987.
- Geraldine's Big Snow, Greenwillow (New York, NY), 1988.
- Maxine in the Middle, Greenwillow (New York, NY), 1989.
- The Best Present, Greenwillow (New York, NY), 1989.
- Henry's Happy Birthday, Greenwillow (New York, NY), 1990.
- What Alvin Wanted, Greenwillow (New York, NY), 1990.
- Horace, Greenwillow (New York, NY), 1991.
- The New Boy, Greenwillow (New York, NY), 1991.
- Furry, Greenwillow (New York, NY), 1992.
- Island Baby, Greenwillow (New York, NY), 1992.
- Harry and Tuck, Greenwillow (New York, NY), 1993.
- Grandfather's Dream, Greenwillow (New York, NY), 1994.
- Geraldine's Baby Brother, Greenwillow (New York, NY), 1994.
- Rosata, Greenwillow (New York, NY), 1995.
- Geraldine First, Greenwillow (New York, NY), 1996.
- I Am Angela, Greenwillow (New York, NY), 1997.
- Merry Christmas, Geraldine, Greenwillow (New York, NY), 1997.
- Angela's Top-Secret Computer Club, Greenwillow (New York, NY), 1998.
- Brave Horace, Greenwillow (New York, NY), 1998.
- Jacob's Tree, Greenwillow (New York, NY), 1999.
- What I See, Harcourt Brace (New York, NY), 1999.
- A Bed Full of Cats, Harcourt Brace (New York, NY), 1999.
- That's Mine, Horace, Greenwillow (New York, NY), 2000.
- Geraldine and Mrs. Duffy, Greenwillow (New York, NY), 2000.
- Cecil's Garden, Greenwillow (New York, NY), 2002.
- Farfallina and Marcel, Greenwillow (New York, NY), 2002.
- What a Hat!, Greenwillow (New York, NY), 2003.
- The Hat, Harcourt (Orlando, FL), 2005.
- Pearl's New Skates, Greenwillow (New York, NY), 2005.
- Sophie's Window, Greenwillow (New York, NY), 2005.
- Fafallina & Marcel, 2005.
- Nosy Rosie, 2006.
- Help, 2007.
- The Van, 2008.
- Miranda's Beach Day, 2009.

For Children; Illustrator

- Jane Thayer, Clever Raccoon, Morrow (New York, NY), 1981.
- Melvin Berger, Why I Cough, Sneeze, Shiver, Hiccup, and Yawn, Crowell (New York, NY), 1983.
- Roma Gans, Rock Collecting, Crowell (New York, NY), 1984.
- Franklyn Mansfield Branley, Snow Is Falling, Crowell (New York, NY), 1986.
- Franklyn Mansfield Branley, Air Is All around You, Harper & Row (New York, NY), 1986, revised edition, Crowell (New York, NY), 1986.
- Patricia Lauber, Snakes Are Hunters, Crowell (New York, NY), 1988.
- Franklyn Mansfield Branley, Shooting Stars, Crowell (New York, NY), 1989.
- Patricia Lauber, An Octopus Is Amazing, Crowell (New York, NY), 1990.
- Paul Showers, Ears Are for Hearing, Crowell (New York, NY), 1990.
- Barbara Juster Ebensen, Sponges Are Skeletons, HarperCollins (New York, NY), 1993.
- Patricia Lauber, Be a Friend to Trees, HarperCollins (New York, NY), 1994.
- Wendy Pfeffer, From Tadpole to Frog, HarperCollins (New York, NY), 1994.
- Patricia Lauber, Who Eats What?: Food Chains and FoodWebs, HarperCollins (New York, NY), 1995.
- Patricia Lauber, You're Aboard Spaceship Earth, HarperCollins (New York, NY), 1996.
- Wendy Pfeffer, What's It Like to Be a Fish?, HarperCollins (New York, NY), 1996.
- Stuart J. Murphy, The Best Bug Parade, HarperCollins (New York, NY), 1996.
- Roma Gans, Let's Go Rock Collecting, HarperCollins (New York, NY), 1997.
- Nola Buck, Morning in the Meadow, HarperCollins (New York, NY), 1997.
- Wendy Pfeffer, Sounds All Around, HarperCollins (New York, NY), 1999.
- Franklyn Mansfield Branley, Snow Is Falling, revised edition, HarperCollins (New York, NY), 1999.
- Anne Rockwell, Growing like Me, Silver Whistle (San Diego, CA), 2001.
- Paul Showers, Hear Your Heart, HarperCollins (New York, NY), 2001.
