= Grandmother Winter =

1999 book by Phyllis Root

- Author: Phyllis Root
- Language: English
- Genre: Picture book
- Published: 1999
- Publisher: Houghton Mifflin Harcourt
- ISBN: 978-0-395-88399-0

Grandmother Winter is a 1999 picture book written by Phyllis Root and illustrated by Beth Krommes. Grandmother Winter was Krommes' first illustrated book. The story is drawn from German fairy tales and describes the seasons.

== About ==
Grandmother Winter is a picture book for children which describes the seasons in a poetic way. The story is inspired by "Mother Holle" from German fairy tale stories. Grandmother Winter enjoys spending time with her white geese and as they lose their soft feathers, she gathers them together. She uses the feathers to fill a quilt that she makes and when she has finished sewing, snowflakes fill the sky. As the snow falls, people and animals find warm spaces in their homes and nests. Then Grandmother Winter goes to sleep under the quilt herself.

Krommes uses hand-tinted scratchboard drawings to illustrate the book. Grandmother Winter was her first time illustrating a picture book.

== Reviews ==
The Horn Book Magazine called Beth Krommes' work, "handsome stylized art". School Library Journal wrote that the illustrations were "Impressive" and that the story's "poetic language and detailed art blend to create a whimsical delight."
