= The Fabled Fourth Graders of Aesop Elementary School =

2007 novel by Candace Fleming

- Author: Candace Fleming
- Language: English
- Publisher: Schwartz & Wade
- Publication date: August 14, 2007
- Publication place: United States
- Pages: 178
- ISBN: 0-375-83672-1
- OCLC: 70864393

The Fabled Fourth Graders of Aesop Elementary School is a 2007 children's novel by Candace Fleming. A follow-up novel, Fabled Fifth Graders of Aesop Elementary School, was published in 2010.

== Plot ==
The book is about the naughty fourth grade class at Aesop Elementary School. Each chapter (which is also a story) ends with one of Aesop's Fables's morals such as when Calvin Tallywong wishes that he was back in Kindergarten.

== Reception ==
A Kirkus Reviews review says "Despite a Dewey error and some humor over the head of the target audience, this is a winner, and the final story seems to promise a fifth-grade sequel". Kathleen Isaacs of Booklist, reviewed the book saying, "Mr. Jupiter’s first appearance promises a fantasy, but except for one other episode of wish fulfillment, this is, rather, exaggeration for the sake of humor. Fun for some, but other readers may play hooky before the year is over". A Publishers Weekly review says, "Packed with puns of varying cleverness, the fables range from pithy to protracted, the morals from spot-on to strained. Even with the inconsistencies, there's plenty to laugh at and even to ponder".
