= The House in the Night =

2008 children's picture book

- Author: Susan Marie Swanson
- Illustrator: Beth Krommes
- Genre: Children's book
- Publisher: Houghton Mifflin Company
- Publication date: May 5, 2008
- Publication place: United States
- Pages: 32
- Awards: Caldecott Medal (2009)
- ISBN: 0-618-86244-7
- OCLC: 138339428
- Dewey Decimal: [E] 22
- LC Class: PZ7.S97255 Hou 2008

The House in the Night is a children's picture book written by Susan Marie Swanson and illustrated by Beth Krommes. Published in 2008, the book is a bedtime verse about the light in a house during the night. Krommes won the 2009 Caldecott Medal for her illustrations.

== Reception ==
The House in the Night was well received by critics, including starred reviews from Booklist, Kirkus Reviews, and Publishers Weekly.

Kirkus Reviews called the illustrations "breathtaking", noting that they "embody and enhance the text's message that light and dark, like comfort and mystery, are not mutually exclusive, but integral parts of each other". Publishers Weekly similarly wrote, "Krommes's [...] astonishing illustrations are so closely intertwined with the meticulous text that neither can be isolated without a loss of meaning".

Language Arts's Marlene Beierle also commented on the illustrations, highlighting how they "convey a sense of tranquility and safety". Considering that the book is "inspired by a traditional nursery rhyme from the 1955 Oxford Nursery Rhyme Book" and "how the world has change and grown since 1955", Beierle "wonder[ed] if today's children will see themselves in this story the same way [...] their parents and grandparents do, or if the fantasy elements and the joy of both the illustrations and the tale will make it one that is destined to be read and reread".

== Awards and honors ==
In 2008, Booklist included The House in the Night on the Editors' Choice: Top of the List list.

The following year, it won the Caldecott Medal for illustration, and the Association for Library Service to Children included it on their list of Notable Children's Books.

Awards
Preceded by The Invention of Hugo Cabret	Caldecott Medal recipient 2009	Succeeded by The Lion & the Mouse
