= Elisha Cooper =

American writer

- Born: February 22, 1971 (age 55)
- Occupations: Writer, Illustrator
- Writing career
- Genres: Fiction, Non-fiction, Children's literature
- Website: www.elishacooper.com

Elisha Cooper is an American writer and children's book author. Cooper went to Foote School and Hopkins School in Connecticut. After graduating from Yale, he worked for The New Yorker as a messenger. In 2016 he was a Maurice Sendak Fellow, a residency program for illustrators.

Cooper is the author of the memoirs Falling: A Daughter, a Father, and a Journey Back, ridiculous/hilarious/terrible/cool: A Year in an American High School, and Crawling: A Father's First Year, and several sketchbooks.

Children's books include 8: An Animal Alphabet, Train, Farm, Homer, Beaver Is Lost, Ice Cream, Ballpark, Building, Dance!, Magic Thinks Big, A Good Night Walk, and Beach.

Dance! was a New York Times Ten Best Illustrated winner in 2001. Beach was a Society of Illustrators Gold Medal best illustrated book of the year in 2006. A New York Times Book Review said of Magic Thinks Big, "Elisha Cooper's watercolors, like his sentences, are simple and quiet and essentially perfect." His book Big Cat, Little Cat was a Caldecott Honor book in 2018. River won the Robin Smith Picture Book Prize in 2020.

He currently lives in New York City with his wife and two daughters.

== Bibliography ==
=== Books ===
Non-fiction

- A Year in New York, 1995
- Off the Road: An American Sketchbook, 1996
- A Day At Yale, 1998
- California: A Sketchbook, 2000
- Crawling: A Father's First Year, 2006
- ridiculous/hilarious/terrible/cool: A Year in an American High School, 2008
- Falling: A Daughter, a Father, and a Journey Back, 2016

Picture Books

- Country Fair, 1997; 1998 Charlotte Zolotow Award Commendation
- Ballpark. 1998
- Building, 1999
- Henry: A Dog's Life, 1999
- Dance!, 2001 - New York Times Best Illustrated Book of the Year, 2001
- Ice Cream, 2002
- Magic Thinks Big, 2004
- A Good Night Walk, 2005
- Bear Dreams. 2006
- Beach, 2006
- Beaver Is Lost, 2010
- Farm, 2010
- Homer, 2012
- Train, 2013
- 8: An Animal Alphabet, 2015; 2016 Mathical Book Prize
- Big Cat, Little Cat, 2017; 2018 Caldecott Honor, 2018 Charlotte Zolotow Award Commendation
- River, 2019
- Yes & No, 2021
