= Susan Marie Swanson =

American writer

Susan Marie Swanson (born May 19, 1955) is an American author of children's literature, poet, and educator. Swanson is best known for her children's book The House in the Night, which won a Minnesota Book Award, and the 2009 Caldecott Medal.

She was born in Hinsdale, Illinois and lives in St. Paul, Minnesota.

== Bibliography ==
- Getting Used to the Dark: 26 Night Poems (1997)
- Letter to The Lake (1998)
- The First Thing My Mama Told Me (2002)
- To Be Like the Sun (2008)
- The House in the Night (2008)
