= Rainbow Crow =

1989 children's book

- Author: Nancy Van Laan
- Illustrator: Beatriz Vidal
- Language: English
- Genre: Children's literature
- Publisher: Alfred A. Knopf
- Publication date: April 10, 1989
- Publication place: United States
- Pages: 32
- ISBN: 978-0679819424

Rainbow Crow: A Lenape Tale is a 1989 children's book written by Nancy Van Laan and illustrated by Beatriz Vidal. Van Laan wrote it after encountering a corn planting ceremony of the Lenape tribe. While the book presents the story as originating from a Lenape legend, the authenticity of this origin has been questioned, as there is no record of the tale before the book's publication in 1989.

== Plot ==
Prior to the existence of mankind, animals were the only inhabitants of the world. When the first snowfall occurred, they all believed that the snow would engulf them. Crow, a rainbow-feathered crow, volunteered to go to the Great Sky Spirit to ask for warmth. The Spirit gave him fire and upon returning back to Earth, Crow was singed and lost his voice. Hence, he was upset, but the Spirit reassured him that his flesh became unappealing for predators and that the rainbow was now hidden in his black plumage.

== Background and style ==
Van Laan said she came up with Rainbow Crow after coming across a corn planting ceremony of the Lenape tribe in Bucks County, Pennsylvania, and hearing the stories told by tribe elder Bill Thompson; she said that the moment reminded her of her childhood. According to The Morning Call, Van Laan received permission from the tribe to retell the tale of the rainbow crow. The Nanticoke and Lenape Confederation disputes that the story belongs to the Lenape, indicating that it is a modified version of a Cherokee tale and that the story is "undocumented and unknown among any Lenape People prior to its publication in 1989".

The story is accompanied by watercolor drawings. Kirkus Reviews and School Library Journal's Kathleen Riley wrote that they are drawn in a primitive style. Michael Dorris of The New York Times indicated that the illustrations are reminiscent of "Russian or Latin American folk art".

== Reception ==
Kirkus Reviews called Van Laan's text "effective for reading aloud or storytelling" and Vidal's drawing of Crow trailing fire "especially striking". Dorris thought that Rainbow Crow was "altogether charming". He pointed out that Van Laan's version of the tale is "lively and rhythmic" and that each of the drawings are "a pleasure to behold". Riley called the book a "fine read-aloud" thanks to the "smooth text and songs with repetitive chants". Writing for the Los Angeles Times, Jane Yolen believed that Van Laan's rendition of the tale has "the powerful rhythms of the native storyteller" and deemed Rainbow Crow "strong and evocative". Both Kirkus Reviews and Dorris noted the book's broad appeal. At the 1991 Alabama Library Association Authors Awards, Van Laan won an award in the juvenile fiction category for Rainbow Crow.

Margaret Deaver of The Wichita Eagle wrote that vibrant drawings "capture the mood and the spirit of the legend". The Lexington Herald-Leader's Tandra J. White-Jennings commended the illustrations for making the animals seem lively. In The Vidette-Messenger, Luci Hand wrote that Vidal did "an outstanding job" of illustrating Crow's story.

In a negative review, the Nanticoke and Lenape Confederation wrote that labeling the tale as belonging to the Lenape is "misleading and demeaning our traditional stories". They write that "There is no shortage of true Lenape and Nanticoke stories that accurately portray our history, life, culture, and beliefs that can be told", and emphasize that the crow was not a major or common theme in Lenape culture.
