= Sandra Markle =

American author of children's books

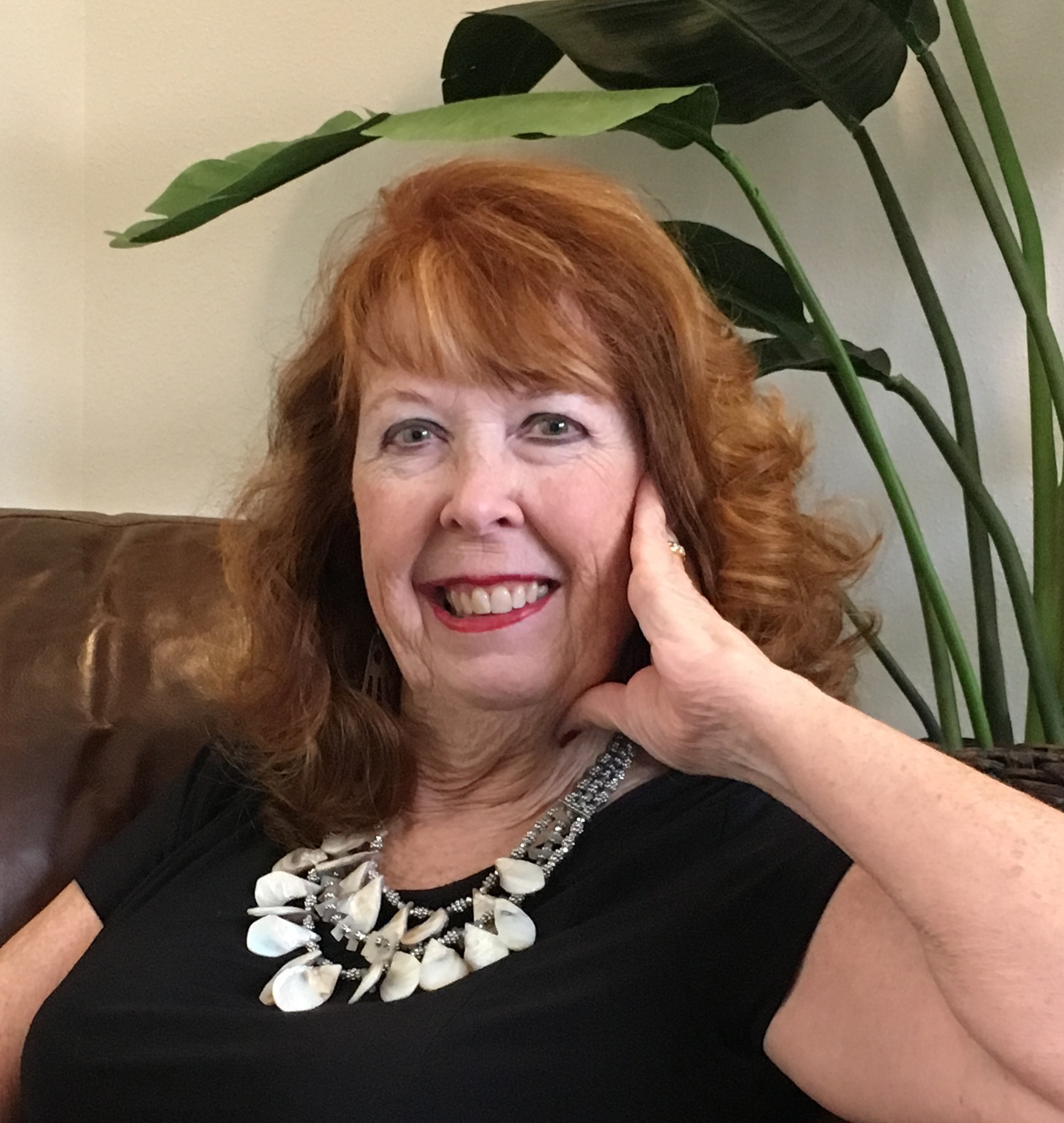
- Sandra Markle in 2023
- Born: Sandra Haldeman; November 10, 1946 (age 79); Fostoria, Ohio
- Education: Fostoria High School; Bowling Green State University
- Occupation: Author
- Spouse: William Markle (1968–1999) Yale B. Jeffery III (2000-present)
- Children: 2
- Writing career
- Genre: Children's nonfiction

Sandra Markle (born November 10, 1946, in Fostoria, Ohio) is an American author of children's books. She has published more than 200 non-fiction books for children. She worked on a project for the National Science Foundation called Kit & Kaboodle which helped students to understand science better. She has won many awards for her books.

== Personal life and education ==
Markle was born on November 10, 1946, in Fostoria, Ohio, to Robert and Dorothy (née Sauler) Haldeman. She graduated from Fostoria High School, then received a Bachelor of Science degree Bowling Green State University in 1968, after which she conducted her graduate studies at Ohio University and the University of North Carolina.

She married William Markle on August 10, 1968. The couple has two children: Scott and Holly.

== Career ==
Markle worked as an elementary and middle school teacher until 1979 at which time she started being a full-time writer.

Markle has published more than 200 non-fiction books for children, primarily on science topics. She appeared as Ms. Whiz on local television in Asheville, North Carolina, and Atlanta, Georgia. She wrote and helped developed science specials for CNN and PBS. She also produced the first on-line interactive program from Antarctica in 1996: On-line Expedition Antarctica. She has also written fiction, creating the young adult novel, The Fledglings (now available as an e-book "Soaring Like Eagles"), and a series of poetic prose natural history stories, including The Long, Long Journey, and Waiting For Ice. Sandra Markle is particularly noted for her work in sharing scientists as detectives solving real-life mysteries, including "The Case of the Vanishing Golden Frogs," "The Case of the Vanishing Honeybees," and "The Case of the Vanishing Little Brown Bats."

== Unique experiences ==
Markle was chosen to journey to Antarctica in 1996 and 1998 as part of the National Science Foundation's Artists and Writers Program. A number of books came out of her experiences in Antarctica, including A Mother's Journey (Charlesbridge, 2005).

Markle also worked on a project for the National Science Foundation called Kit & Kaboodle. Its goal was to make science more interactive in order to improve student understanding of basic curriculum concepts. The results of independent testing conducted by Georgia State University revealed that students participating in Kit & Kaboodle scored significantly higher on related skills tests than those that did not. Kit & Kaboodle has been used by thousands of schools in all fifty states plus eleven countries.

== Partial list of awards ==
- AAAS SB&F Award For Excellence in Science Books (Middle Grade Level)
- Bank Street College of Education's list of "Best Children's Books of the Year"
- Boston Globe-Horn Book Awards Honor Book
- Children's Book Council/International Reading Association Children's Book Choice
- International Reading Association Teacher's Choice Awards List
- Nick Jr. Magazine's Best Books of the Year
- Texas Blue Bonnet selection
- Texas Mockingbird Award
- John Burroughs List of Nature Books for Young Readers
- Various selections for the Outstanding Science Trade Books for Students lists of the National Science Teachers Association.
- 2nd place in the book contest of 2013

== Sources ==
- Interviews with NZ Children's Authors: Sandra Markle
- Ohio Center For The Book: Cleveland Public Library "Ohio Authors: Sandra Markle"
- Teaching with Children's Books: A Scientific Approach by Lisa Von Drasek from Teachi
