= Catherine Stock =

- Genres: MOR
- Instrument: Vocals
- Labels: Sierra Records

Catherine Stock (1955–2004) was a British singer who had a top 20 single in 1986.

== Career ==
She was the sister of record producer Mike Stock and in 1986 married songwriter Johnny Worth, who wrote the theme tune to the television series To Have And To Hold later in the year. Stock recorded a demo of the song as Worth intended Marti Webb to sing the final version, but, as contractual requirements prevented Webb from doing so, ITV simply used Stock's demo.

Demand for the theme was such that Stock re-recorded it for release on Sierra Records in October 1986, and it made the top 20 of the UK singles charts, Stock promoting it on Top of the Pops.

It was however Stock's only release on record, making her a one-hit wonder. Stock died in January 2004, aged only 49.
