= Joyce Sidman =

American children's writer (born 1956)

- Born: June 4, 1956 (age 70); Minnesota, U.S.
- Education: Wesleyan University (BA)
- Occupation: Children's book author

Joyce Sidman (born June 4, 1956) is an American children's writer. She was a runner-up for the 2011 Newbery Medal, and won the Sibert Medal in 2019.

She graduated from Wesleyan University, with a B.A. in German. She is married and lives in Wayzata, Minnesota with her husband and their two sons.

== Selected works ==
=== Poetry ===
- Like the Air. Georgetown, KY: Finishing Line Press, 1999. ISBN 978-0-9664324-2-8

=== Children's books ===
- Just Us Two: Poems about Animal Dads. Illustrator Susan Swan. Brookfield, CT: Millbrook Press, 2000.
- Eureka!: Poems about Inventors. Illustrator K. Bennett Chavez. Brookfield, CT: Millbrook Press. 2002. ISBN 978-0-7613-1665-7.
- The World According to Dog: Poems and Teen Voices. Illustrator Doug Mindel. Boston: Houghton Mifflin. 2003. ISBN 978-0-618-17497-3.
- Song of the Water Boatman: Pond Poems. Illustrator Beckie Prange. Boston: Houghton Mifflin. 2004. ISBN 978-0-618-13547-9. "joyce sidman."
- Meow Ruff: A Story in Concrete Poetry. Illustrator Michelle Berg. Boston: Houghton Mifflin. 2006. ISBN 978-0-618-44894-4.
- Butterfly Eyes and Other Secrets of the Meadow. Illustrator Beth Krommes. Boston: Houghton Mifflin. 2006. ISBN 978-0-618-56313-5. "joyce sidman."
- This Is Just to Say: Poems of Apology and Forgiveness. Illustrator Pamela Zagarensky. Boston: Houghton Mifflin, 2007. ISBN 978-0-618-61680-0
- Red Sings From Treetops: A Year in Colors. Illustrator Pamela Zagarensky. Boston: Houghton Mifflin. 2009. ISBN 978-0-547-01494-4. "joyce sidman."
- Dark Emperor & Other Poems of the Night|
- Ubiquitous: Celebrating Nature's Survivors, Illustrator Beckie Prange, Houghton Mifflin Books for Children, 2010, ISBN 978-0-618-71719-4
- Swirl by Swirl: Spirals in Nature, Illustrator Beth Krommes, Houghton Mifflin Harcourt, 2011, ISBN 978-0-547-31583-6
- Round, Illustrated by Taeeun Yoo, Houghton Mifflin Harcourt, 2017, ISBN 978-0-544-38761-4. Round received Mathical Honors
- The Girl Who Drew Butterflies: How Maria Merian's Art Changed Science, Houghton Mifflin Harcourt, 2018, ISBN 978-0-544-71713-8
