= Capstone Publishers =

American publishing house

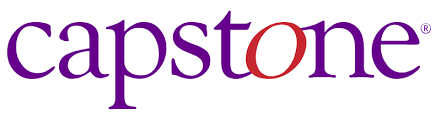
- Parent company: Coughlan Companies
- Country of origin: United States
- Headquarters location: Mankato, Minnesota
- Distribution: self-distributed (United States); South Pacific Books (New Zealand); Educational Concepts (Sales) (Australia); Alkem (Singapore); Intersoft (South Africa); Farbe Education (Turkey); Roundhouse Group (UK); Macmillan Distribution (Raintree UK)
- Key people: Bob Coughlan (Principal), Jim Coughlan (Principal) Tom Ahern, (CEO), Bill Rouse (COO/CFO), Steve Robinson (CFO), Matt Keller (CMO), Todd Brekhus (President, myON), Ashley Andersen Zantop (Chief Content Officer), Ross Gilbertson (CIO), Miles Stevens-Hoare (Managing Director, Oxford)
- Publication types: Books
- Imprints: Switch Press, Stone Arch Books, Picture Window Books, Compass Point Books
- No. of employees: ~300
- Official website: www.mycapstone.com

Capstone is a publisher of children's books and digital products. Capstone focuses on the educational market. They also sell to the trade market and internationally. Capstone publishes nonfiction, fiction, picture books, interactive books, audio books, literacy programs, and digital media. Imprints and divisions include Capstone Press, Compass Point Books, Picture Window Books, Stone Arch Books, Red Brick Learning, Capstone Digital, Heinemann-Raintree and Switch Press. Capstone acquired the assets of Heinemann-Raintree library reference from Pearson Education in 2008. Heinemann-Raintree has offices in Chicago and Oxford, England. Capstone is based in Mankato, Minnesota, with additional offices in Minneapolis, Chicago, and Oxford. Capstone is part of Coughlan Companies, Inc.

== History ==
- 1990 Capstone Press acquired
- 1991 Capstone Press first titles released
- 1998 Pebble brand created
- 1999 Capstone creates their first imprint, Compass Point Books
- 2001 Capstone creates their second imprint, Picture Window Books
- 2002 Red Brick Learning Launched
- 2003 FactHound.com Launched
- 2004 Pebble Plus launched
- 2005 Capstone creates their third imprint, Stone Arch Books
- 2007 Capstone Publishers (Capstone) established to unite imprints
- 2007 Capstone Interactive Library Launched
- 2008 Capstone acquired Heinemann Global Library
- 2008 Capstone Launched CollectionWiz
- 2009 PebbleGo Launched
- 2009 Capstone Digital Launched
- 2010 PebbleGo Earth and Science Launched

== Imprints ==
Capstone imprints contain fiction and nonfiction titles. Capstone also has digital products (myON, Capstone Interactive Library, CapstoneKids FactHound and PebbleGo) and services (CollectionWiz and Library Processing).

- Capstone Press – publishes nonfiction for grades preK-8.
- Compass Point Books – publishes nonfiction with a focus on topics such as history, science, biography and careers, grades 5-12.
- Picture Window Books – publishes fiction and nonfiction easy readers, picture books and chapter books, grades preK-4.
- Stone Arch Books – publishes fiction for grades K–9.
- Switch Press – publishes nonfiction, cookbooks, craft and how-to titles, and narrative nonfiction. Historical fiction, fantasy, graphic novels, and poetry for young adult reads.
