= Don't Let the Pigeon Stay Up Late! =

2006 picture book by Mo Willems

- Front cover showing the pigeon with his bunny in hand
- Author: Mo Willems
- Cover artist: Willems
- Language: English
- Series: Pigeon Series
- Subject: Sleep, Bedtime, Families, Health
- Genre: children's books picture books
- Publisher: Hyperion Books for Children
- Publication date: 2006
- Publication place: United States of America
- Pages: 36
- ISBN: 978-0-7868-3746-5
- OCLC: 62085518
- Dewey Decimal: [E] 22
- LC Class: PZ7.W65535 Don 2006
- Preceded by: The Pigeon Finds a Hot Dog!
- Followed by: The Pigeon Wants a Puppy!

Don't Let the Pigeon Stay Up Late! is the title of a bestselling children's picture book by Mo Willems. Published by Disney-Hyperion in 2006, it is part of Willems's "Pigeon" series. It's getting dark out, but one stubborn Pigeon is refusing to go to bed. received a National Parenting Publications Award in 2006 and was named one of the top three books for kindergarteners and first graders in a 2006 poll by Scholastic Books. In 2011, Weston Woods adapted the book to an animated short film, directed by Pete List.

== Reception ==
Reviews for the book have been positive. In the New York Times Book Review, Bruce Handy called the title pigeon "one of this decade's contributions to the pantheon of great picture book characters". He added, "The Pigeon is whiny, shortsighted, narcissistic, needy, relentless and nakedly manipulative; in short, the Pigeon is a thinly veiled 4-year-old, drawn by Willems with a sure, simple line and a keen sense, as the pages turn, of comic timing." Kirkus Reviews found "If this offering necessarily lacks the freshness of the original, its wholehearted sense of fun more than makes up for any hint of formula." and Publishers Weekly wrote that "Willems uses voice bubbles and emphatic lettering to suggest the Pigeon's tone of voice, and his solid-color backgrounds progressively dim from soft pink to lavender to a relaxing gray-blue and warm violet, enhancing the growing sense of drowsiness. At last, the hyperactive Pigeon succumbs to slumber, but sleep-resistant and savvy readers will likely plead to read this again."

== See also ==
- Don't Let the Pigeon Drive the Bus!
- The Pigeon Finds a Hot Dog!
- The Pigeon Wants a Puppy!
- The Duckling Gets a Cookie!?
- The Pigeon HAS to Go to School!
- The Pigeon Needs a Bath!
- The Pigeon Will Ride the Roller Coaster!
