= Weston Woods Studios =

American film production company

- Type: Subsidiary
- Industry: Film
- Founded: 1953; 73 years ago Weston, Connecticut, U.S.
- Founder: Morton Schindel
- Headquarters: Norwalk, Connecticut, U.S.
- Key people: Richard Robinson (CEO)
- Parent: Scholastic Corporation (1996–present)
- Website: www.scholastic.com/site/Weston_Woods_Plus.html

Weston Woods Studios (or simply Weston Woods) is an American production company and animation studio that makes audio and short films based on well-known books for children. It was founded in 1953 by Morton Schindel in Weston, Connecticut, and named after the wooded area near his home. Weston Woods Studios' first project was Andy and the Lion in 1954; its first animated film was The Snowy Day in 1964. In 1968, Weston Woods began a long collaboration with animator Gene Deitch. Later, they opened international offices in Henley-on-Thames, England, UK (1972), as well as in Canada (1975) and Australia (1977). In addition to making the films, Weston Woods also conducted interviews with the writers, illustrators, and makers of the films. The films have appeared on children's television programs such as Captain Kangaroo, Eureeka's Castle, and Sammy's Story Shop. In the mid-1980s, the films were released on VHS under the Children's Circle titles, and Wood Knapp Video distributed these releases from 1988 to 1995.

Beginning in 1968, Weston Woods also made filmstrips and audio recordings synchronized to them, which became known as the Picture Book Parade. Many of these recordings were narrated by actor Owen Jordan and were often different or expanded recordings from the films.

In 1996, Weston Woods was acquired by Scholastic Corporation.

== Selected filmmakers ==
- Gene Deitch
- Galen Fott
- Pete List
- Michael Sporn

== Selected filmography ==
- 1954 – Andy and the Lion
- 1955 – Make Way for Ducklings
- 1955 – Stone Soup
- 1955 – Millions of Cats
- 1955 – The Story About Ping
- 1956; 2007 – Georgie
- 1956; 2007 – The Little Red Lighthouse and the Great Gray Bridge
- 1956; 2006 – Mike Mulligan and His Steam Shovel
- 1958 – Curious George Rides a Bike
- 1958 – The Five Chinese Brothers
- 1959 – Harold and the Purple Crayon
- 1959 – Madeline's Rescue
- 1959 – Madeline and the Bad Hat
- 1959 – Madeline and the Gypsies
- 1960 – Caps for Sale
- 1960 – In the Forest
- 1960 – The Stonecutter
- 1961 – Frog Went A-Courtin'
- 1961 – Time of Wonder
- 1964 – The Snowy Day
- 1964 – Robert McCloskey
- 1965 – Whistle for Willie
- 1965 – The Tale of Custard the Dragon (spoofed by RiffTrax)
- 1966 – Maurice Sendak
- 1967 – Blueberries for Sal
- 1967 – Mr. Rabbit and the Lovely Present
- 1969 – Drummer Hoff
- 1969 – The Fox Went out on a Chilly Night
- 1970 – Hush, Little Baby
- 1970 – Rosie's Walk
- 1970 – A Letter to Amy
- 1970 – The Fisherman and His Wife
- 1971 – The Twelve Days of Christmas
- 1971 – Peter's Chair
- 1971 – Wynken, Blynken and Nod
- 1971 – The Owl and the Pussycat
- 1973 – A Story, A Story
- 1974 – The Beast of Monsieur Racine
- 1974 – Tikki Tikki Tembo
- 1974 – Anansi the Spider
- 1974 – Goggles!
- 1975 – Where the Wild Things Are
- 1976 – Really Rosie
- 1977 – Strega Nona
- 1977 – Apt. 3
- 1977 – Gene Deitch: The Picture Book Animated
- 1978 – Smile for Auntie
- 1980 – Teeny-Tiny and the Witch-Woman
- 1981 – Moon Man
- 1981 – The Trip
- 1981 – Morton Schindel: From Page to Screen
- 1982 – The Hat
- 1982 – The Tomten
- 1982 – Morris's Disappearing Bag
- 1982 - Clown of God
- 1982 - Tomi Ungerer: Storyteller
- 1983 – Burt Dow: Deep-Water Man
- 1984 – Corduroy
- 1984 – King of the Cats
- 1984 – Why Mosquitoes Buzz in People's Ears
- 1984 – Doctor DeSoto (Academy Award for Best Animated Short Film nominee)
- 1985 – The Amazing Bone
- 1986 – The Village of Round and Square Houses
- 1986 – Swimmy
- 1987 – In the Night Kitchen
- 1987 – Jonah and the Great Fish
- 1988 – The Three Little Pigs (with Erik Blegvad illustrations)
- 1989 – Mufaro's Beautiful Daughters
- 1989 – Owl Moon
- 1990 – The Happy Lion
- 1990 – The Emperor's New Clothes
- 1990 – Danny and the Dinosaur
- 1991 – Flossie & the Fox
- 1991 – The Little Red Hen
- 1991 – The Three Billy Goats Gruff
- 1992 – Red Riding Hood
- 1992 – Pet Show!
- 1992 – Here Comes the Cat!
- 1992 – The Great White Man-Eating Shark
- 1993 – Goldilocks and the Three Bears
- 1993 – Sylvester and the Magic Pebble
- 1993 – Princess Furball
- 1994 – The Three-Legged Cat
- 1994 – Noisy Nora
- 1997 – Harry the Dirty Dog
- 1997 – Officer Buckle and Gloria
- 1998 – A Weekend with Wendell
- 1998 – Angus and the Ducks
- 1998 – Chicken Little
- 1998 – Good Night, Gorilla
- 1998 – Wilfrid Gordon McDonald Partridge
- 1998 – John Henry
- 1998 – The Night Before Christmas
- 1999 – Chrysanthemum
- 1999 – Chicka Chicka Boom Boom
- 1999 – Zin! Zin! Zin! A Violin!
- 1999 – This Land is Your Land
- 2000 – Miss Rumphius
- 2000 – Pete's a Pizza
- 2000 – The Scrambled States of America
- 2000 – The Paperboy
- 2000 – Johnny Appleseed
- 2001 – In the Small, Small Pond
- 2001 – Click, Clack, Moo: Cows That Type
- 2001 – Possum Magic
- 2001 – Joseph Had a Little Overcoat
- 2001 – The Ugly Duckling
- 2001 – Henry Hikes to Fitchburg
- 2002 – Too Many Tamales
- 2002 – There Was An Old Lady Who Swallowed A Fly
- 2003 – Dem Bones
- 2003 – Bark, George
- 2003 – Giggle, Giggle, Quack
- 2003 – The Teacher From the Black Lagoon
- 2003 – Snowflake Bentley
- 2003 – Henry Builds a Cabin
- 2004 – Chicka Chicka 1, 2, 3
- 2004 – Duck for President
- 2004 – Over in the Meadow
- 2004 – The Dot
- 2004 – This Is The House That Jack Built
- 2004 – The Wheels on the Bus
- 2004 – No Roses for Harry!
- 2004 – The Elves and the Shoemaker
- 2005 – Arnie the Doughnut
- 2005 – Roberto the Insect Architect
- 2005 – The Man Who Walked Between the Towers
- 2005 – Hansel and Gretel
- 2006 – James Marshall's Cinderella
- 2006 – Diary of a Spider
- 2006 – He's Got the Whole World in His Hands
- 2006 – Knuffle Bunny: A Cautionary Tale
- 2006 – Inch by Inch
- 2006 – Hondo and Fabian
- 2006 – Lon Po Po
- 2006 – Emily's First 100 Days of School
- 2006 – Giraffes Can't Dance
- 2007 – Curious George Rides a Bike
- 2007 – Dooby Dooby Moo
- 2007 – John, Paul, George and Ben
- 2007 – A Very Brave Witch
- 2007 – Seven Blind Mice
- 2007 – Leonardo, the Terrible Monster
- 2007 – Open Wide: Tooth School Inside
- 2007 – The Librarian From the Black Lagoon
- 2007 – The Owl and the Pussy-Cat (version)
- 2007 – Owl Moon
- 2007 – Rosa
- 2007 – Wynken, Blynken and Nod
- 2008 – Do Unto Otters
- 2008 – Grandfather's Journey
- 2008 – The True Story of the 3 Little Pigs
- 2008 – What Do You Do with a Tail Like This?
- 2009 – Don't Let the Pigeon Drive the Bus!
- 2009 – Knuffle Bunny Too: A Case of Mistaken Identity
- 2009 – The Gym Teacher From the Black Lagoon
- 2009 – The Scrambled States of America Talent Show
- 2009 – There's Something in My Attic
- 2009 – Goodnight Moon
- 2010 – The Dinosaurs of Waterhouse Hawkins
- 2010 – Naked Mole Rat Gets Dressed
- 2010 – Splat the Cat
- 2010 – The Pigeon Finds A Hot Dog!
- 2010 – Five Little Monkeys Jumping on the Bed
- 2011 – Don't Let the Pigeon Stay Up Late!
- 2011 – Scaredy Squirrel
- 2012 – Edwina, the Dinosaur Who Didn't Know She Was Extinct
- 2012 – Knuffle Bunny Free: An Unexpected Diversion
- 2012 – A Sick Day for Amos McGee
- 2013 – I Want My Hat Back
- 2013 – The Ant and the Grasshopper
- 2013 – Creepy Carrots!
- 2013 – Bear Has a Story to Tell
- 2014 – The Duckling Gets a Cookie!?
- 2014 – Extra Yarn
- 2014 – This is Not My Hat
- 2015 – Goldilocks and the Three Dinosaurs
- 2015 – That is NOT a Good Idea!
- 2015 - Bugs in My Hair!
- 2015 - Peanut Butter and Jellyfish
- 2015 - I'm Brave
- 2015 - Scaredy Squirrel at Night
- 2016 - Groovy Joe: Ice Cream & Dinosaurs
- 2017 – Mother Bruce
- 2018 – Du Iz Tak?
- 2019 – The Pigeon HAS to Go to School!
- 2019 – Potato Pants!
- 2023 – The Pigeon Will Ride the Roller Coaster!

== DVD releases ==
In 2002, a VHS/DVD collection of Weston Woods films entitled Scholastic Video Collection was released.

== HBO Max ==
In 2021, the company's Mo Willems book adaptations were released on Warner Bros. Discovery's SVOD service HBO Max. Mo Willems' Storytime Shorts! include all 14 of the company's Mo Willems book cartoons.

== See also ==
- Reading Rainbow
- Between the Lions
- Michael Sporn
