= Pete List =

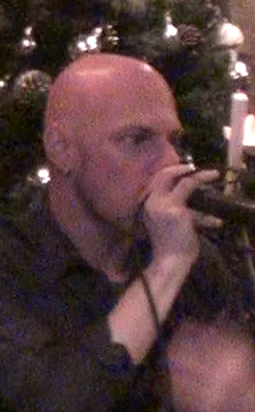

Background information
- Genres: Middle Eastern
- Instrument: beatbox

Pete List is an Italy-based musician and animator.

== Career ==
List has done animation work for Celebrity Deathmatch and Doug. He directed the Marilyn Manson music video for "Astonishing Panorama of the Endtimes". Some of his work has focused on children's videos for Scholastic & Weston Woods Studios. In 2020 he created a short that was a response to Donald Trump’s handling of COVID-19.

List was the animator for the video adaptations of Don't Let the Pigeon Drive the Bus! which won the 2010 Carnegie Medal for Excellence in Children's Video and That is NOT a Good Idea! which won in 2016.

List is a multi-instrumentalist and a member of Beatbox Guitar with Rob Mastrianni, and Djinn with Carmine Guida. His music with Djinn is featured on the Istanbul episode of Anthony Bourdain's No Reservations.

== Selected works ==
- Doug
- Don't Let the Pigeon Stay Up Late! (adaptation)
- The Duckling Gets a Cookie!?, won the International Animated Film Association-East award for Excellence in Animation
- The Pigeon Finds a Hot Dog!
- Leonardo, the Terrible Monster
- That is NOT a Good Idea!
- Don't Let the Pigeon Drive the Bus!
- Goldilocks and the Three Dinosaurs
- Astonishing Panorama of the Endtimes
- Celebrity Deathmatch

=== Partial discography ===
- Songs for Kassar
