= Don't Let the Pigeon Drive the Bus! =

2003 picture book by Mo Willems

- Front cover
- Author: Mo Willems
- Cover artist: Willems
- Language: English
- Genre: Children's books picture books
- Publisher: Hyperion Books for Children
- Publication date: April 1, 2003
- Publication place: United States
- Media type: Hardcover
- Pages: 36
- ISBN: 978-0-7868-1988-1
- OCLC: 51815360
- Dewey Decimal: [E] 22
- LC Class: PZ7.W65535 Dj 2003
- Preceded by: N/A
- Followed by: The Pigeon Finds a Hot Dog!

Don't Let the Pigeon Drive the Bus! is a children's picture book written and illustrated by Mo Willems. Published by Disney-Hyperion in 2003, it was Willems' first book for children, and received the Caldecott Honor. The plot is about a bus driver who has to leave so he asks the reader to not allow the Pigeon to drive the bus. The Pigeon wants to have at least one ride and comes up with various excuses to drive the bus, but the reader(s) keep on refusing, which aggravates the Pigeon. An animated adaptation of the book, produced by Weston Woods Studios in 2009, won the 2010 Carnegie Medal for Excellence in Children's Video.

On December 11, 2025, it was announced that an animated series adaptation titled The Pigeon Show! Starring the Pigeon was greenlit by Paramount+ alongside The Elephant & Piggie Show! (based on another Mo Willems children's book series).

== Sequels ==
Willems has created further books about the Pigeon's adventures:

- The Pigeon Finds a Hot Dog! (2004)
- Don't Let the Pigeon Stay Up Late! (2006)
- The Pigeon Wants a Puppy! (2008)
- The Duckling Gets a Cookie!? (2012)
- Don't Let the Pigeon Finish this Activity Book! (2012)
- The Pigeon Needs a Bath! (2014)
- The Pigeon HAS to Go to School! (2019)
- The Pigeon Will Ride the Roller Coaster! (2022)
- Don't Let the Pigeon Drive the Sleigh! (2023)
- Will the Pigeon Graduate? (2025)
- It's My Bird-Day! (2026)

=== Board books ===
- The Pigeon Has Feelings, Too! (2005)
- The Pigeon Loves Things That Go! (2005)

Cameo appearances by the Pigeon can also be found in Willems's Knuffle Bunny, Elephant & Piggie, Leonardo, the Terrible Monster and Cat the Cat book series.

== Reception ==
In addition to the Caldecott Honor, Don't Let the Pigeon Drive the Bus! is an American Library Association Notable Book, a National Council of Teachers of English Notable Book, a Bulletin of the Center for Children's Books Blue Ribbon Book, and a South Carolina Picture Book Award winner Based on a 2007 online poll, the National Education Association listed the book as one of its "Teachers' Top 100 Books for Children." It was selected as one of the "Top 100 Picture Books" of all time in a 2012 poll by School Library Journal.

The Pigeon Finds a Hot Dog! is a Publishers Weekly Best Book of the Year. Don't Let the Pigeon Stay Up Late! is a Parenting Magazine Best Book. The Pigeon Wants a Puppy! is the 2009 Children's Choice Kindergarten to Second Grade Book of the Year.

Each of the four standard-format Pigeon books has been on the New York Times best-seller list.

A 2011 scientific study entitled "Let the Pigeon Drive the Bus" examined the ability of pigeons to solve the traveling salesperson problem by taking the shortest route to visit multiple feeders in a laboratory. The authors found that pigeons "appeared to plan ahead multiple steps," which provided "clear and strong evidence that animals other than primates are capable of planning sophisticated travel routes."

In April 2023, the 20th anniversary edition of Don't Let the Pigeon Drive the Bus! was released by Hyperion
