= Morton Schindel =

American film producer

- Born: April 23, 1918; City of Orange, New Jersey
- Died: August 20, 2016 (aged 98); Weston, Connecticut
- Education: Columbia University
- Occupation: Educator
- Years active: 1948–2016
- Spouse: Cari Best

Morton Schindel (April 23, 1918 – August 20, 2016) was an American educator, producer, and founder of Weston Woods Studios, which specializes in adapting children's books into animated films. He named the company after the wooded area outside his home in Weston, Connecticut.

Born and raised in Orange, New Jersey, Schindel went to the University of Pennsylvania, earning a bachelor's degree in 1939 from the Wharton School of Finance. In 1941 he married Ellen Bamberger (of the family famed for the Bamberger's department store chain); the couple had two daughters and one son. In 1948 he worked with Teaching Films Inc. After it declared bankruptcy, he opened his own company, Key Productions, but found film distributors uninterested in his ideas to create animated films of children's picture books.

== Weston Woods Studios ==
In 1949 Schindel received a master's degree in curriculum from Teachers College, Columbia University. In 1953 he founded Weston Woods Studios, which has since produced more than 500 films and film strips, beginning with Andy and the Lion (1954), adapted from the 1939 Caldecott Honor book by James Daugherty. Weston Woods films were shown at the Museum of Modern Art in 1956, and that same year the films had their CBS television premiere on Captain Kangaroo. In 1963 the studio released its first animated film, The Snowy Day, adapted from the 1962 Caldecott Medal book by Ezra Jack Keats, and the following year, it produced a documentary. The Lively Art of Picture Books, for the American Library Association. The Doughnuts (1963) was a 28-minute live-action comedy based on a chapter from Robert McCloskey's Homer Price (1943). Beginning in 1968, Gene Deitch became the leading animation director for Weston Woods, working from his studio in Czechoslovakia with his wife, Zdenka Deitchova.

== Recognition ==
Known for remaining faithful to the books he adapted, Schindel was nominated for an Academy Award for Best Animated Short Film Doctor DeSoto (1984), which he produced with Michael Sporn.

In the tale a mouse-dentist agrees to treat a fox, yet he fears he could be eaten by the fox. Schindel recalled, “This was probably one of our best films. The book it was based on had great illustrations and won a Newbery medal for its writing, so it made for a great film.”

Schindel also made documentaries about artists, such as the 18-minute Robert McCloskey (1964), a documentary which is sometimes screened in art schools. The film shows McCloskey sitting in the Boston Public Garden and intercuts pages from his sketchbook drawings for Make Way for Ducklings. The illustrator discusses experiences that have influenced his work and the relationship of craftsmanship to inspiration.

In 1996, Scholastic, Inc. acquired Weston Woods, and Schindel founded the nonprofit Weston Woods Institute to work on such educational endeavors as the Children's Literacy Project.

== Awards and honors ==
Schindel was awarded the Regina Medal in 1979.

In 2002 Weston Woods was the focus of the Donnell Library Center's "Meet the Maker" film series. "Twentieth-century Mirrors: America Seen through the Eyes of Independent Filmmakers," which featured a panel discussion with Schindel and Deitch as part of a month-long program honoring Weston Woods’ 50 years of films.

In 2007 Schindel was given a Lifetime Achievement Award from the Connecticut Center for the Book, associated with the Library of Congress, and a plaque from the International Storytelling Center acknowledged his contribution to “Blazing New Trails for Storytelling.”

Purdue University's College of Education includes a study of Weston Woods films in an undergraduate children's media course, and in 2008 Schindel received an honorary doctoral degree in education from Purdue.

Schindel's wife, Cari Best, is a prolific children's book author (Sally Jean, the Bicycle Queen) with Farrar, Straus and Giroux.
