= Goldilocks and the Three Dinosaurs =

2012 children's picture book by Mo Willems

Goldilocks and The Three Dinosaurs
- Author: Mo Willems
- Cover artist: Willems
- Language: English
- Genre: Children's Book
- Published: September 1, 2012
- Publisher: Balzer and Bray
- Publication place: United States
- ISBN: 9780062104182

Goldilocks and the Three Dinosaurs is the title of a children's picture book by Mo Willems. Published in 2012 by Balzer and Bray, it is a parody of the traditional tale of "Goldilocks and the Three Bears" but the bears are replaced with Dinosaurs.

== Reception ==
Kirkus Book Reviews called it "Top-notch for group storytime, for a project on revising classics or just for enjoyment; funniest for kids who know the original." A review from Publishers Weekly praised the book's humour and commented that it is "a sure bet for audiences who have moved beyond more gently witty fare". Regan McMahon, reviewing from Common Sense Media, stated that the book is an "exceptional delight" with an art style that included "sly elements to entertain adults".

== Adaptations ==
Weston Woods Studios produced a short film adaptation in 2015 with animation by Pete List.

Willems adapted the book for the stage with original music by Ben Folds. The work was performed by the National Symphony Orchestra in April 2022 at the Kennedy Center in Washington, D.C. and featured performances by Evan Casey, Montego Glover, Erika Rose, Andrew Ross Wynn, and Tony Yazbeck with direction by Willems. The Nashville Symphony produced the work in March 2023, with performances by Kenzie Wynne, Galen Fott, Nettie Kraft, Kit Bulla, and Charles Edward Charlton, and with Enrico Lopez-Yañez conducting.
