= The Duckling Gets a Cookie!? =

2012 picture book by Mo Willems

- Author: Mo Willems
- Illustrator: Mo Willems
- Language: English
- Subject: Children's literature, Picture book
- Published: April 2012 (Hyperion Books for Children)
- Publication place: United States
- Media type: Print (hardback, paperback)
- Pages: 36 (unpaginated)
- ISBN: 9780545816717
- OCLC: 899217278
- Preceded by: The Pigeon Wants a Puppy!
- Followed by: The Pigeon Needs a Bath!

The Duckling Gets a Cookie!? is a 2012 picture book by Mo Willems. It is about a duckling that asks for, and receives, a cookie, which the Pigeon that complains about it, but is then flummoxed when the duckling passes the cookie to him.

In 2014, Weston Woods adapted the book to a 7-minute animated short film, directed by Pete List and starring Willems as the Pigeon and Trixie Willems as the Duckling.

== Reception ==
Booklist, reviewing The Duckling Gets A Cookie!?, wrote "Willems has an extraordinary ability to convey immediate, deep characterization with a few deft strokes. He knows, too, how to spread the action across a picture book, carefully managing the panels and page turns to ramp up the drama. Fans will delight at another outing, and the protagonist's indelible "pigeonality" will welcome newcomers to the club." and the School Library Journal wrote "While just plain fun to read aloud, this book is an excellent conversation starter on the topics of politeness and making reasonable requests. This meta-tale that references the gamut of the Pigeon oeuvre will please fans and newcomers alike."

The Horn Book Magazine's review noted "Simple speech-balloon text, animated illustrations, and a clean design continue to be a successful formula for Willems's brand of storytelling."

The Duckling Gets a Cookie!? has also been reviewed by Publishers Weekly, Kirkus Reviews, Common Sense Media, The New York Times, and AudioFile.

== Awards ==
- 2013 CCBC Choice,
- 2013 Irma Black Award - honor

== See also ==
- Don't Let the Pigeon Drive the Bus!
- The Pigeon Finds a Hot Dog!
- Don't Let the Pigeon Stay Up Late!
- The Pigeon Wants a Puppy!
- The Pigeon Needs a Bath!
- The Pigeon Will Ride the Roller Coaster!
