= Peggy Rathmann =

American illustrator and author (1953–2026)

Margaret Crosby "Peggy" Rathmann (March 4, 1953 – November 3, 2026) was an American illustrator and author of popular children's books including Good Night, Gorilla and Officer Buckle and Gloria, which won the 1996 Caldecott Medal.

== Early life and education ==
Rathmann was born in St. Paul, Minnesota, and grew up in a family with five children. In early elementary school, she was often seated in the back of the room to avoid her blocking the view of other students, but she could not see the board because she was near-sighted. "I remember the teacher talking about the alphabet and thinking, 'What alphabet?'" Rathmann credits her third-grade teacher, who painted stories to engage students, with helping her become a good reader.

She attended Mounds View High School, and then the University of Minnesota, graduating with a degree in psychology. She planned to become a doctor, enrolling in medical school at Macalester College. But she dropped out after a year and a half to instead pursue a career in scientific illustration, and began training at the American Academy of Art in Chicago. She left that program after two years, and spent the next three years studying portrait artistry at studios in Minneapolis.

== Children's book career ==
After she was able to soothe her crying niece by drawing a funny story in her sketchbook, Rathmann decided to become a children's book author and spent the next two years expanding the original story to 150 pages. When it was "subsequently turned down by every major publisher", she was devastated. Rathmann moved into her parents' home, and she and her mother enrolled in a children's book class taught by Barbara Bottner.

As part of an assignment, Rathmann wrote her first picture book, Ruby the Copycat (1991). Following its publication, she was awarded Most Promising New Author in Publishers Weekly's 1991 Cuffie Awards. Rathmann then illustrated Bootsie Barker Bites (1992), written by her instructor Barbara Bottner.

At age 35, when she was divorced and living in her parents' home, Rathmann got a book agent. She subsequently wrote and illustrated Good Night, Gorilla (1994) followed by Officer Buckle and Gloria (1995) — which won the 1996 Caldecott Medal for picture book illustration. Upon receiving news of the award, Rathmann got into bed and "waited to die of embarrassment", fearing that critics would "expose, ridicule, and then crucify" her. Eventually she was able to appreciate the honor.

Rathmann wrote Ten Minutes till Bedtime (1998) and The Day The Babies Crawled Away (2003), which made the Horn Book Magazine's annual Fanfare List. In 2014, Good Night, Gorilla was a runner-up for the Phoenix Picture Book Award from the Children's Literature Association, which annually recognizes the best picture book that did not win a major award 20 years earlier. "Books are considered not only for the quality of their illustrations, but for the way pictures and text work together."

=== Beliefs and work habits ===
Rathmann would take at least nine months to write each of her books, and found the writing more difficult than the illustrations. She struggled in the editing stages: "It kills me! I used to call my editor and try to give the money back. I'd say, 'Look, I'm sorry, but I'm giving you the money back. Trust me, you don't want this book it's not working.'" She continued: "Then they'd cut me some slack, and I'd work on it for a few more months." Rathmann cited Maurice Sendak as an influence, and described him as making "good books for bad children". Other influences include Dr. Seuss and A. A. Milne.

== Personal life and death ==
Rathmann was married to John Wick, a former construction foreman who renovated her bathroom in San Francisco. In the middle of the remodeling project, Rathmann ran out of money. Wick offered to finish the work for free, and they married in 1996.

They lived on a 540-acre (220 ha) ranch in Marin County, California, that they purchased in 1998. Their regenerative agriculture efforts on the ranch were featured in a 2018 New York Times article.

Rathmann died on November 3, 2026, at the age of 73.

== Books ==
Rathmann illustrated at least seven picture books, six of which she also wrote.

- Ruby the Copycat (Scholastic, 1991), ISBN 9780590437479
- Bootsie Barker Bites, written by Barbara Bottner (G. P. Putnam's Sons, 1992), ISBN 9780698114272
- Good Night, Gorilla (Putnam, 1994), ISBN 9780399224454
- Officer Buckle and Gloria (Putnam, 1995), ISBN 9780399226168
- 10 Minutes till Bedtime (Putnam, 1998), ISBN 9780142400241
- The Day the Babies Crawled Away (Putnam, 2003), ISBN 9780399231964
- How Many Lambies on Grammy's Jammies? (Putnam, 2006), ISBN 9780399231971

Several translations have been published. Gute Nacht, Gorilla (2006) was named "Book of the Month" for September 2006 by the German Institut für Jugendliteratur (young people's literature).
