= Officer Buckle and Gloria =

1995 picture book by Peggy Rathmann

- Front over showing Caldecott Medallion
- Author: Peggy Rathmann
- Illustrator: Peggy Rathmann
- Genre: children's book
- Publisher: Putnam Books
- Publication date: 1995
- Publication place: United States
- ISBN: 978-0-399-22616-8
- OCLC: 69654218
- Dewey Decimal: [E] 20
- LC Class: PZ7.R1936 Of 1995

Officer Buckle and Gloria is a 1995 picture book by Peggy Rathmann that won the 1996 Caldecott Medal. The story was adapted into an animated film narrated by John Lithgow, released in 1997 by Weston Woods Studios.

== Development ==
Peggy Rathmann got the idea for Officer Buckle and Gloria in 1988 after her writing teacher, Barbara Bottner, encouraged her use her own negative traits to create a character. Rathmann said: "Safety happens to be a fixation of mine. I created the character of Officer Buckle because nobody ever listened to my safety tips either".

== Plot summary ==
In the town of Napville, policeman Officer Buckle frequently gives safety speeches at the local school, but the boring nature of his speeches causes the students to lose interest. One day, Officer Buckle is assigned to take a police dog named Gloria to the school for a safety speech. During the speech, Gloria, behind Officer Buckle's back, demonstrates the safety tips discussed by acting out the effects in pantomime. The speech is a success as Gloria's performance catches the students' interests, and a confused but thrilled Officer Buckle receives a vast number of letters from the students, unaware that their attention is focused on Gloria and not him.

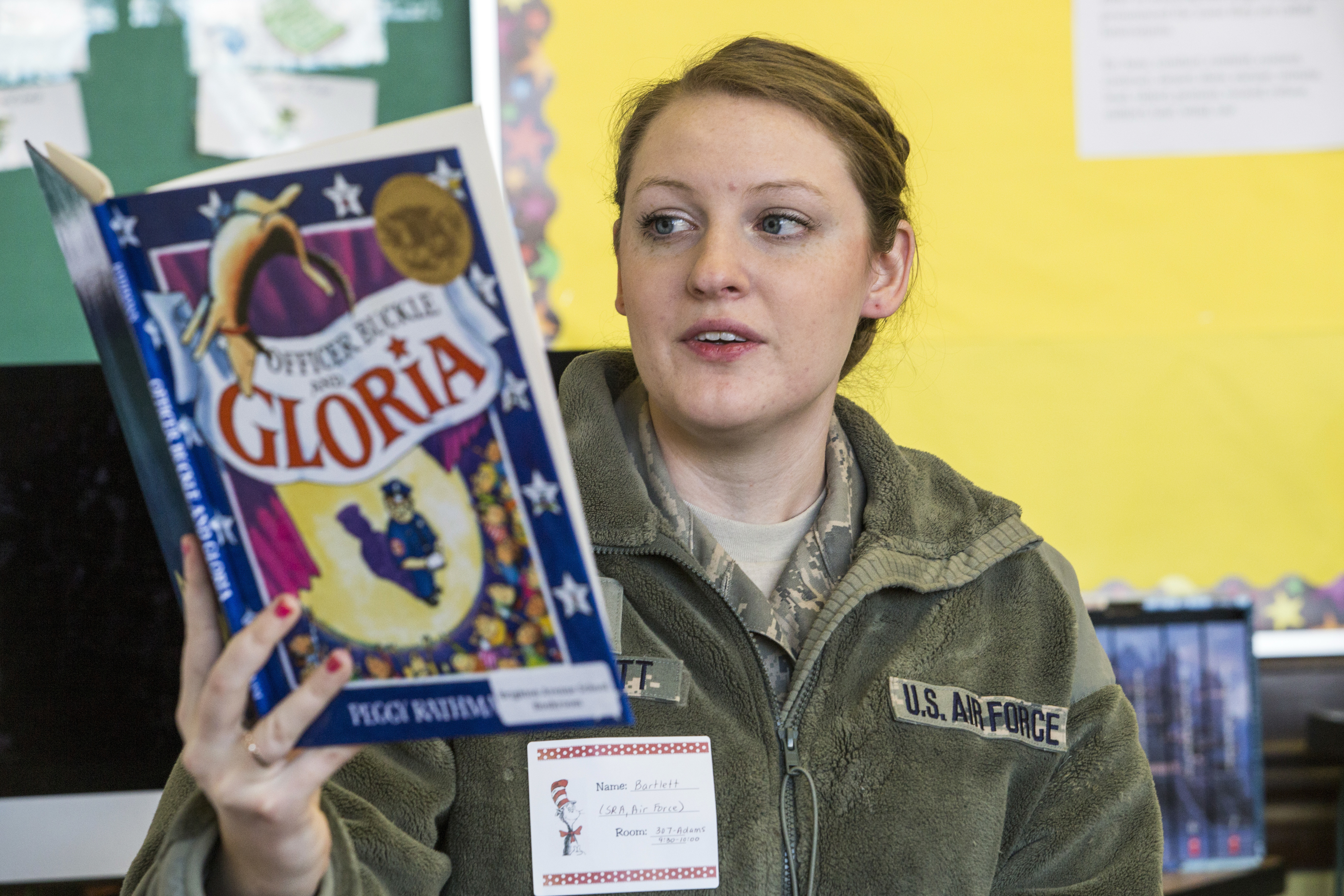
An airman reads Officer Buckle and Gloria to students for a Read Across America initiative.

As time passes, Officer Buckle gains fame as he gives safety speeches to other schools with Gloria. Officer Buckle does not realize the truth behind his fame until seeing one of his taped speeches at a college on the news, revealing Gloria's antics. Livid, Officer Buckle refuses to give a planned speech at the local school, so Gloria is brought to the school alone. Without Officer Buckle, Gloria becomes lonely and falls asleep, ending her stay early; afterwards, a large accident happens at the school as a spilled jar of banana pudding causes students to slip around and knock into the principal Mrs. Toppel, who accidentally hurls a hammer towards the crowd upon impact.

The next day, Officer Buckle receives another stack of letters from the students, detailing the accident. Upon seeing a letter from a student named Claire—the one who always wears her helmet and thus, was protected when the hammer hit her, who notes how Gloria had missed Officer Buckle the day before, he reconciles with Gloria and decides to return to giving safety speeches. In the end, they go to many schools and teach the students about safety together.

== Reception and legacy ==
Officer Buckle and Gloria won the 1996 Caldecott Medal. Upon receiving news of the award, Rathmann has said that she felt "sick with fear" that critics would "expose, ridicule, and then crucify me", and got into bed where she "waited to die of embarrassment".

It has been widely praised. The National Education Association listed the book as one of its "Teachers' Top 100 Books for Children" in 2007. It was one of the "Top 100 Picture Books" of all time in a 2012 poll by School Library Journal. The story was adapted into an animated film narrated by John Lithgow, released in 1997 by Weston Woods Studios.

Awards
Preceded by Smoky Night	Caldecott Medal recipient 1996	Succeeded by Golem
