= Open Wide =

Open Wide may refer to:

== Books ==
- Open Wide: Tooth School Inside, book by American author and illustrator Laurie Keller

== Music ==
- "Open Wide", 2012 song by CLSM album Return to the Unexpected
- "Open Wide" (song), 2014 song by Calvin Harris featuring Big Sean
- "Open Wide", 2005 song by Staind, as an additional track on the release "Right Here"
