= Roberto: The Insect Architect =

Children's picture book written and illustrated by Nina Laden, published in 2000

- Author: Nina Laden
- Illustrator: Nina Laden
- Language: English
- Genre: Picture book, Children's literature
- Publication place: United States
- Pages: 40
- Preceded by: Arnie the Doughnut
- Followed by: The Man Who Walked Between the Towers

Roberto: The Insect Architect is a children's picture book by Nina Laden. It was published in 2000 by Chronicle books, Inc.

== Plot ==
A termite named Roberto tries to fulfill his dream of becoming an architect. He moves to the city so that he can become an architect and when he is there, he is influenced by great architects. Roberto finds ways to help the community and use his talents.

== Reception ==
The book was reviewed by the Atlanta Journal and Constitution, Albuquerque Journal, and School Arts. It was also adapted into a 2005 animated children's short film by Weston Woods Studios, directed by Galen Fott and Jerry Hunt. The book is a Smithsonian Notable Book and the film is an ALA Notable Video and Showcommotion Best Audience Animation Award.
