= The Scaredy Cats =

2003 children's picture book by Barbara Bottner

- First edition cover (pub. Simon & Schuster Children's Publishing)
- Author: Barbara Bottner
- Illustrator: Victoria Chess
- Publisher: Simon & Schuster Children's Publishing
- Publication date: April 1, 2003
- ISBN: 978-0-689-83786-9

The Scaredy Cats is a 2003 children's picture book by Barbara Bottner, and illustrated by Victoria Chess. It was first published by HarperCollins Publishers.

== Plot ==
The Scaredy Cat parents wakes up in the morning, they can't function because they are scared of things that could possibly happen. The Scaredy Cats live through a day of fear.

== Reception ==
Martha V. Parravano of Horn Book Magazine reviewed the book saying,

Phobic children everywhere will be induced to laugh at their fears, and Bottner makes the book extra appealing (and, indeed, empowering) by making Baby Scaredy Cat the brave one--no adult lectures here. Don't expect the Scaredy Cats to change that much, though: Baby Scaredy Cat leads the way to a pretty tame approach to risk taking, with Chess's final vignette showing Baby demonstrating that well-known extreme sport, swinging.

Diane Roback of Publishers Weekly wrote,

Along with inviting, cozy details (a wood-beamed ceiling, bright textiles and overstuffed sofas), she includes a fish-shaped planter, a bird in a bell jar, etc. As with Henry Allard and James Marshall's The Stupids, children will enjoy being braver than the Scaredy Cats themselves.

Trevelyn E. Jones, of School Library Journal reviewed the book saying, "This delightful tale humorously makes the point that the greatest risk in life may be in not taking one."
