= Carnegie Medal for Excellence in Children's Video =

Andrew Carnegie Medal
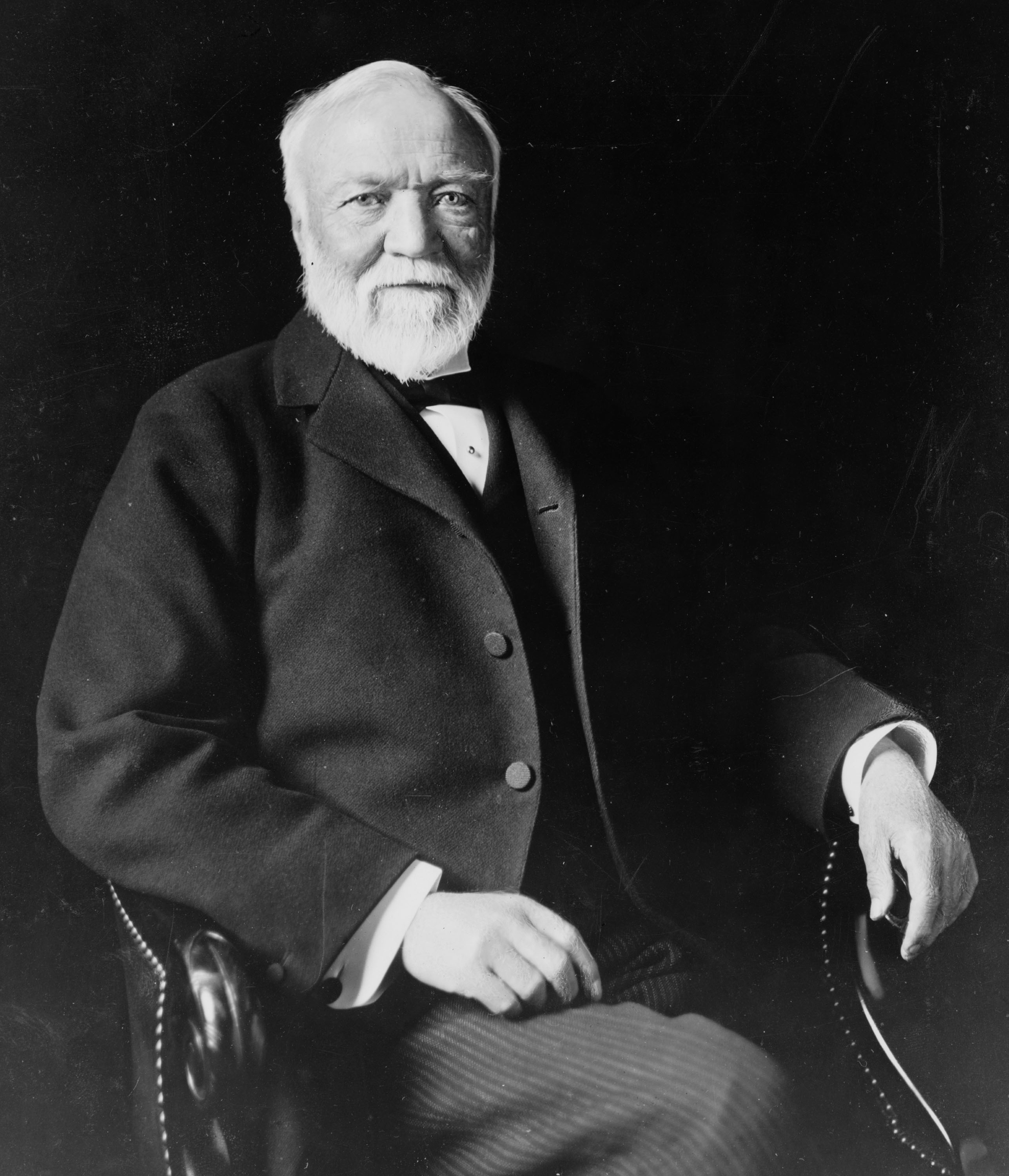
- Andrew Carnegie, who donated millions to libraries
- Awarded for: Best American video for children
- Country: United States
- Presented by: Association for Library Service to Children, a division of the American Library Association
- First award: 1991
- Final award: 2017
- Website: ala.org/alsc/carnegie

The Andrew Carnegie Medal for Excellence in Children's Video was named in honor of nineteenth-century American philanthropist Andrew Carnegie. It honored the producer of the most outstanding video production for children. The Medal was supported by the Carnegie Corporation of New York and was administered by the Association for Library Service to Children (ALSC), a division of the American Library Association (ALA), through a Carnegie endowment.

== Criteria ==
- The video must have demonstrated excellence in the execution of the special techniques of the medium; in the visual interpretation of story, theme, or concept; in the use of sound; in the delineation of plot, theme, characters, mood setting, or information presented; in the acting, when appropriate; and in the appropriateness of technique or treatment to the story, theme, or concept.
- The video must have demonstrate excellence of presentation for a child audience (age 0–14 years).
- The video may have been in cassette or DVD format.
- Only one Medal was presented, regardless of the number of producers involved in the video selected.
- The video must have been distributed in the United States. Videos originally released in other countries were not eligible.
- The award was limited to producers who are citizens or residents of the United States.
- The video could have been feature length, but not a theatrically released feature.
- The video could have been based on another medium or made for another medium (e.g., television).
- Adaptations of material originally produced in other mediums should have remained true to, expand, or complement the original work in some way.
- The video should have been available for use in homes, public libraries, and with community organizations.
- The award was given only for work produced during the previous year, not for a body of work.

== Recipients ==
Winners of the Carnegie Medal for Excellence in Children's Video
Year	Title	Producers	Studios	Comments
1991	Ralph S. Mouse	George McQuilkin; John Matthews	Churchill Films	This video is based on the book by Beverly Cleary about a mouse who rides a motorcycle and talks to boys.
1992	Harry Comes Home	Peter Matulavich	Barr Films	
1993	The Pool Party	John Kelly; Gary Soto	Fast Forward	
1994	Eric Carle: Picture Writer	Rawn Fulton	Searchlight Films	This video is a portrait of Eric Carle author and illustrator of several very popular picture books for children such as The Very Hungry Caterpillar.
1995	Whitewash	Michael Sporn	Churchill Media	This video tells the story of a young black girl's encounter with racism.
1996	Owen	Paul R. Gagne	Weston Woods	This video is based on the Caldecott Honor book by Kevin Henkes about a boy who refuses to part with his blanket and a concerned neighbor who gives his parents advice.
1997	Notes Alive! On the Day You Were Born	Tacy Mangan	What a Gal Productions; Minnesota Orchestra	This video is based on the children's book by Debra Frasier.
1998	Willa: An American Snow White	Tom Davenport	Davenport Films	This video is based on the classic Grimm Tale reset in Virginia in 1915.
1999	The First Christmas	Frank Moynihan	Xyzoo Animation; Billy Budd Films	This video uses clay animation and traditional Christmas music, colloquial dialogue and humor to tell the well-known story of the birth of Jesus.
2000	Miss Nelson Has a Field Day	Paul R. Gagne	Weston Woods Studios	This video is based on the book by Harry Allard.
2001	Antarctic Antics	Paul R. Gagne	Weston Woods Studios	This video is based on the book by Judy Sierra.
2002	My Louisiana Sky	Dante Di Loreto; Anthony Edwards; Willard Carroll; Tom Wilhite	Weston Woods Studios; Hyperion Studio	This video is about a girl coming to terms with her mentally challenged parents.
2003	So You Want to Be President?	Paul R. Gagne; Melissa Reilly	Weston Woods Studios	This video is based on the Caldecott Medal book by Judith St. George and David Small.
2004	Giggle, Giggle, Quack	Paul R. Gagne; Melissa Reilly	Weston Woods Studios	This video is based on the picture book by Doreen Cronin and Betsy Lewin.
2005	The Dot	Paul R. Gagne; Melissa Reilly; Peter H. Reynolds; Karen Bresnahan; Gary Goldberger; Jonathan Meath	Weston Woods Studios; FableVision	This video is based on the picture book by Peter H. Reynolds in which a girl draws a dot and discovers the artist within.
2006	The Man Who Walked Between the Towers	Michael Sporn; Paul R. Gagne; Melissa Reilly	Michael Sporn Animation, Inc. Weston Woods Studios	This video is based on the Caldecott Medal picture book by Mordicai Gerstein about the acrobat who walked a tight rope between the two towers of the World Trade Center in New York City.
2007	Knuffle Bunny	Mo Willems	Weston Woods Studios	This video is based on the Caldecott Honor picture book by Willems.
2008	Jump In!: Freestyle Edition	Kevin Lafferty; John Davis; Amy Palmer Robertson; Danielle Sterling	Walt Disney Studios Home Entertainment	This video tells the story of a young boxer who finds a passion for jumping rope.
2009	March On! The Day My Brother Martin Changed the World	Paul R. Gagne; Melissa Reilly	Weston Woods Studios	The video is Dr. Christine King Farris’ memory of the historic march on Washington.
2010	Don't Let the Pigeon Drive the Bus	Paul R. Gagne; Mo Willems	Weston Woods Studios	The video is the story of a pigeon who wants to drive a bus, based on the book by Willems.
2011	The Curious Garden	Paul R. Gagne; Melissa Reilly Ellard	Weston Woods Studios	
2012	Children Make Terrible Pets	Paul R. Gagne; Melissa Reilly Ellard	Weston Woods Studios	
2013	Anna, Emma and the Condor	Katja Torneman	Green Planet Films	Anna and Emma work with the endangered California condor
2014	Bink & Gollie: Two for One	Paul R. Gagne; Melissa Reilly Ellard	Weston Woods Studios	
2015	Me... Jane	Paul R. Gagne; Melissa Reilly Ellard	Weston Woods Studios	
2016	That Is NOT a Good Idea!	Pete List	Weston Woods Studios	Goose goes on a stroll with Fox
2017	Drum Dream Girl: How One Girl's Courage Changed Music	Ryan Swenar	Dreamscape Media	A young girl fulfills her dreams in this video treatment of the acclaimed Pura Belpré Award winner by Margarita Engle.

== Recipients of Multiple Awards ==
Out of twenty-six awards:

- Paul R. Gagne has received thirteen Carnegie Medals (always while working for Weston Woods Studios).
- Melissa Reilly has received nine Carnegie Medals (always while working with Paul R. Gagne at Weston Woods Studios).
- Weston Woods Studios has received sixteen Carnegie Medals.
