= Carmine Guida =

American musician

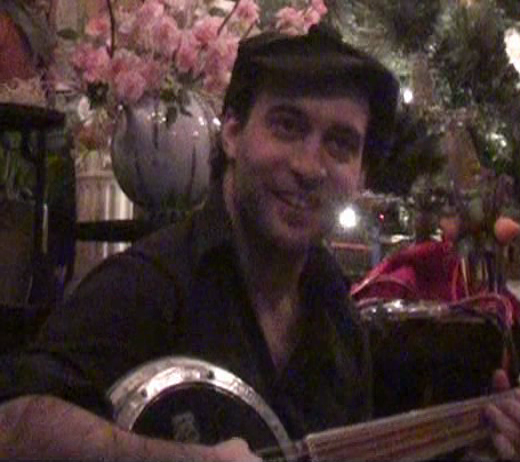
Carmine Guida

Carmine T. Guida is a New York City-based musician, teacher and performer. He is also a programmer and creator of online games and apps.

== Music ==
Guida is known primarily for teaching the doumbek, however also plays several other instruments professionally: oud, cumbus, riq, bass guitar, guitar and mandolin. He appears on the Beginners Guide To Bellydance [Box set] released by UK label Nascente, and is described by ethnomusicologist Eric Bernard Ederer as a well-known Cumbus player alongside Steve Vai.

Guida was voted favorite musician in the New Jersey Belly Dancing Peoples' Choice awards. His performances on doumbek have also been favorably reviewed. Jareeda magazine said of his drumming on a Pangia CD (on which he provided all of the drum solos) "Pangia CDs have ... killer drums solos...". His production, as well as musicianship of the Turkish Band Camp All-Stars CD, was also praised

He has also appeared in the movie Mixed Signals.

=== History ===
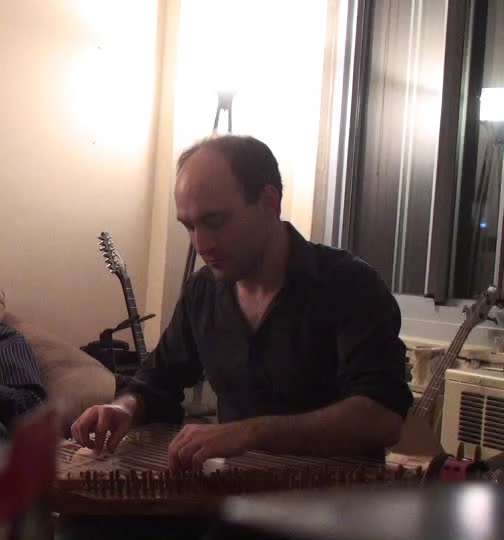
Carmine Guida

Guida was a computer scientist who was CEO of web page development company Team5, when he decided that his time was better spent as a full-time musician.

Carmine's first instrument was the Bass Guitar. He was inspired by groups like Rush and entertained audiences with his slap bass stylings, which were made popular by groups like Primus. Carmine started performing in front of live audiences at his local Church, St. Rose of Lima in Massapequa New York.

=== Performer ===
Carmine T. Guida has had hundreds of performances inside and outside of the US. He performs in New York City with Middle East meets Brooklyn fusion band Djinn. Their debut album, "The Middle East Side", was favorably reviewed by The Chronicles. Guida has also performed with New York City-based progressive rock band Pain Hertz. Carmine also performs monthly on Long Island with traditional bellydance music band Baharat.

=== Releases ===
==== Partial discography ====
Artist	Album	Release date	Instruments	Comments
Paige23	Let Yourself Fall	01/07/2002	Bass Guitar, Mandolin and Djembe	Paige23's second release (the first featuring Carmine T. Guida).
Carmine T. Guida	Not Alone	01/01/2003	Acoustic Guitar	
Efendi	Live at Le Figaro	09/01/2003	Bass Doumbek	
Pain Hertz	jam #4	09/20/2004	Bass guitar	
Carmine and Friend	Flute and doumbek jam	10/12/2004	Doumbek	
Paige23	In Retrospect	02/01/2005	Bass Guitar	Paige23's third release.
Pangia	Volume 3	03/01/2005	Doumbek, Bass Doumbek, Riq	
ShakeEmUp	Bellydance Drum Solos	10/14/2005	Doumbek	Guida's first release of music for bellydancing.
Pangia	Volume 4 - Dreams	03/01/2006	Doumbek, Bass Doumbek, Riq	
Djinn	The Middle East Side	10/01/2006	Cümbüs, Riq	Middle Eastern fusion group Djinn's first release.
Melissa and Carmine	Simplified Middle Eastern Songs for Learning and Practice Volume 1	03/01/2007	Doumbek	
Pangia	Volume 5 - West of East	03/01/2007	Doumbek, Bass Doumbek, Riq	
Melissa and Carmine	Simplified Middle Eastern Songs for Learning and Practice Volume 2	07/01/2007	Doumbek	
Pete List	Songs For Kassar	10/01/2007	Oud, Kanun	also features Rob Mastrianni
Djinn	The Silent D	5/01/2009	Cümbüs, Riq	Djinn's second release.
Pain Hertz	Creative Differences	01/25/2010	Bass guitar	features on bonus jam

==== Videography/filmography ====
Title	Release date	Instrument	Information
Mixed Signals	2001		Brief acting part as a Band Member.
The Heartbeat of Bellydance	08/14/2005	Bass Doumbek	The end of this DVD features a live performance by Jenna, Raquy Danziger and Carmine T. Guida.
ShakeEmUp: Bellydance Drum Solos	10/14/2005	Doumbek	A performance DVD featuring bellydancers with live percussion.
	01/16/2007	Doumbek	The end of this DVD features a performance by Sarah Skinner with live drumming by Carmine T. Guida, Brad Mack and Pete List.
Baby Beginner Doumbek Workshop	10/01/2007	Doumbek	Guida's first instructional DVD.
Begintermediate Doumbek Workshop	07/20/2009	Doumbek	Guida's second instructional DVD.

=== Music licensing ===
Music by Paige23

- Ed - NBC TV
- Medium - NBC TV

Music by Carmine Guida

- Back to the Beginning - ABC TV

Music by Djinn

- Secrets of the Sistine - ABC TV
- Adventures of an Incurable Optimist - ABC TV
- Gothic Bellydance Revelations - World Dance New York DVD
- Sensual Bellydance - World Dance New York DVD
- Belly Dance With Jim Boz - Jim Boz CD
- No Reservations (Istanbul episodes) - Travel Channel
- Back to the Beginning - ABC TV

Music from Shake Em Up

- Pop, Lock and Shimmy - Cheeky Girls Productions DVD
- Killer Ziller - Cheeky Girls Productions DVD

Music from Pangia

- American Belly Dance Legends - Amaya Productions DVD

Music from Dorku

- Music of Turkey: Cultural Crossroads - Carnegie Hall Instructional sheet music/CD

== Games and apps ==
Guida has created apps and games for Apple and Android and is developing a game for the OUYA console. Guida is developing his multi-player space game Quintet for OUYA in response to requests by backers of a fundraising campaign that supported his development for Android. Guida has also developed a free Unity3D tool Dreamlo, which allows users to store and access data on an online database using HTTP requests.
