= Fabian Escapes =

2007 children's picture book

- Author: Peter McCarty
- Cover artist: McCarty
- Language: English
- Series: Hondo & Fabian
- Genre: children's books picture books
- Publisher: Henry Holt & Co.
- Publication date: May 1, 2007
- Publication place: United States
- Pages: 40
- ISBN: 978-0-8050-7713-1
- OCLC: 76134170
- Dewey Decimal: [E] 22
- LC Class: PZ7.M12835 Fab 2007
- Preceded by: Hondo and Fabian
- Followed by: N/A

Fabian Escapes is a children's picture book written and illustrated by Peter McCarty. Released by Henry Holt & Co. in 2007, it is the sequel to the 2002 Caldecott Honor book Hondo & Fabian. This is a book about what happens when Fabian, the cat, leaves the house.

== Reception ==
Kirkus Reviews wrote: "Children will enjoy the story’s gentle, rhythmic exploration of pet relationships." Publishers Weekly also wrote: "McCarty's parallel sentences and soft-focus pencil illustrations hint that Hondo and Fabian are too well-fed to stray. His characteristic pattern, one framed image and one sentence per spread, slows the pace. Yet the artist lends an enigmatic feline quality to Fabian's alert ears and confidently stiff tail, and a glimmer of mischief around Hondo's beady eyes and plush golden contours." The Horn Book wrote: "Part two in the parallel adventures of the cat and dog introduced in McCarty's Hondo and Fabian has the same low-key charm as the first volume."

== See also ==
- Hondo & Fabian
