= Du Iz Tak? =

2016 picture book

- Author: Carson Ellis
- Publisher: Candlewick Press
- Publication date: October 18, 2016
- Pages: unpaged
- Awards: Caldecott Honor
- ISBN: 978-0-7636-6530-2

Du Iz Tak? is a 2016 picture book by Carson Ellis. The story, told in an invented insect language, is about some bugs who discover a plant shoot emerging from the ground. The book was a recipient of a 2017 Caldecott Honor for its illustrations. In 2025, Slate named Du Iz Tak? as one of the 25 greatest picture books of the past 25 years.

== In other media ==
In 2018, a short animated film version was released by Weston Woods Studios, a division of Scholastic, adapted, directed, and animated by Galen Fott. It has been screened at many film festivals around the world, winning the Special Jury Remi Award for best animated short at WorldFest Houston. The audiobook won the 2019 Odyssey Award for Excellence in Audiobook production from the American Library Association The audiobook was written by Carson Ellis and narrated by Eli and Sebastian D’Amico, Burton, Galen and Laura Fott, Sarah Hart, Bella Higginbotham, Evelyn Hipp and Brian Hull.
