= Gillespie and the Guards =

1957 Caldecott picture book

- Author: Benjamin Elkin
- Illustrator: James Daugherty
- Publisher: Viking
- Publication date: 1956
- Pages: unpaged
- Awards: Caldecott Honor

Gillespie and the Guards is a 1956 picture book written by Benjamin Elkin and illustrated by James Daugherty. The book tells the story of a boy who attempts to fool the king's guard. The book was a recipient of a 1957 Caldecott Honor for its illustrations.
