= The Story About Ping =

1933 picture book by Marjorie Flack

- Author: Marjorie Flack
- Illustrator: Kurt Wiese
- Language: English
- Genre: Children's literature
- Publisher: Viking Press
- Publication date: 1933
- Publication place: United States
- Pages: 32
- OCLC: 185400

The Story About Ping is an American children's book written by Marjorie Flack and illustrated by Kurt Wiese. First published in 1933, Ping is an illustrated story about a domesticated Chinese duck lost on the Yangtze River. Based on a 2007 online poll, the National Education Association listed the book as one of its "Teachers' Top 100 Books for Children".

== Plot ==
Ping, the duck, lives on a boat on the Yangtze River in China. Every day he and his duck family are taken by their owner to feed on the riverbank. Later, when it is evening, Ping is the last duck to return to the boat, so he hides to avoid being spanked. The following day Ping, feeling lost, begins to swim in search of his family. Along the way, Ping observes some cormorant fishing birds. A boy captures Ping, but releases him later that evening to prevent Ping from becoming the family's dinner. Upon being released, he sees his master's boat. He hurries to return to his family knowing he will be the last duck again, but this time he accepts the punishment.

== Ping in film ==
The Story About Ping was adapted for film by Weston Woods Studios in 1955.

== Other ==
Because of a coincidence in naming with the ping computer command, this book has become known in the Unix and Internetworking technical communities.
