= David Wisniewski =

American writer

- Born: March 21, 1953; England
- Died: September 11, 2002 (aged 49); Alexandria, Virginia
- Spouse: Donna Harris (m. 1976)
- Children: Ariana, Alexander
- Writing career
- Years active: 1985–2002
- Notable work: Golem
- Notable awards: Caldecott Medal (1997), for Golem

David R. Wisniewski (March 21, 1953 in – September 11, 2002), was an American writer and illustrator best known for children's books.

== Early life ==
Wisniewski was born in England, where his father was stationed as a master sergeant in the Air Force. He and his family moved throughout Europe and America when he was a child, following his father's postings. He credits his mother with teaching him to draw in the first grade, which led to his love of reading, starting with Marvel Comics and moving on to Classics Illustrated.

He attended the University of Maryland, College Park but could not afford more than one semester, and dropped out to join the Ringling Brothers and Barnum & Bailey Clown College, graduating in 1973 after two months. He worked for several years as a clown with both Ringling and Circus Vargas before moving to Maryland, where he was hired by his future wife, Donna Harris, in 1975 to join the Prince George's Country Puppet Theatre. They married in 1976, six months after meeting, and without going on a single date. In 1980, they started the Clarion Puppet Theatre (later known as the Clarion Shadow Theatre), where he learned to use an X-Acto knife to cut out jointed shadow puppets and background scenery. The Clarion Shadow Theatre toured in schools, theaters and at the Smithsonian. In 1990, they presented Peter and the Wolf at the Kennedy Center.

== Writing and illustrating career ==
After his children were born, touring was impossible, so he became a full-time illustrator, working for newspapers and magazines on a freelance basis. In 1987, he met the editor Dilys Evans, who reviewed his portfolio and, according to his recollection, said "I'm going to give you the names and numbers of four publishers and you can tell them I sent you." He procrastinated until two weeks before he was due to meet with the first publisher in New York, when he came up with the idea for what would become his first children's book in 1989, The Warrior and the Wise Man. Wisniewski sold that book to the first publisher, Lothrop, who published it in 1989, four years after he started work as an illustrator. He developed his cut-paper style over successive books, adding multiple layers for depth and detail to characters and scenes. For the 16 illustrations in one book, he estimated he made 800 to 1,000 cuts.

After Golem, Wisniewski turned to lighter fare: "I didn't really have another historical epic left in me for a while, because it's such a Sturm-und-Drang kind of story". However, his first comic pitches to Clarion were rebuffed, and he returned to Lothrop to publish The Secret Knowledge of Grown-Ups in 1998.

Between 1980 and 2002, Donna Wisniewski estimated that David toured 100 schools per year, performing (and later reading from his books).

== Awards ==
His book Golem, won the 1997 Caldecott Medal.

In his acceptance speech, he said of himself: "I am a self-taught artist and writer who depends on instincts developed through years of circus and puppet performance to guide a story's structure and look."

== Selected works ==
- Elfwyn's Saga New York: Lothrop, Lee & Shepard Books, 1990.
- Golem. New York: Clarion Books, 1996.
- Rain Player New York: Clarion Books, 1991.
- The Secret Knowledge of Grown-ups New York: Lothrop, Lee & Shepard Books, 1998.
- Sumo Mouse San Francisco: Chronicle Books, 2002.
- Sundiata: Lion King of Mali New York: Clarion Books, 1992.
- Tough Cookie New York: Clarion Books, 1999.
- The Warrior and the Wise Man New York: Lothrop, Lee & Shepard Books, 1989.
- The Wave of the Sea Wolf New York: Clarion Books, 1994.
- Worlds of Shadow: Teaching with Shadow Puppetry, Teacher Idea Press, 1996 (with Donna Wisniewski).
