= The Elves and the Shoemaker (picture book) =

2003 picture book by Jim La Marche

- Author: Jim La Marche
- Illustrator: La Marche
- Genre: children's books picture books
- Publisher: Chronicle Books
- Publication date: 2003
- Pages: 32
- ISBN: 978-0-8118-3477-3

The Elves and the Shoemaker is a children's picture book by Jim La Marche. Published in 2003 by Chronicle Books, it is a retelling of the fairy tale of the same title.

== Reception ==
Kirkus gave the book a starred review, describing it as a "timeless tale will leave readers suffused with the pleasure of seeing gifts received and appreciated". A review from Publishers Weekly praised the book's illustrations.

== Adaptation to film ==
Weston Woods produced an animated film of this book in 2004, narrated by Patrick Stewart.

== See also ==
- The Elves and the Shoemaker
