= Henry Hikes to Fitchburg =

2000 children's book by D. B. Johnson about Henry David Thoreau

Henry Hikes To Fitchburg
- Front cover
- Author: D.B. Johnson
- Cover artist: Johnson
- Language: English
- Series: Henry
- Genre: Children's literature
- Publisher: Houghton Mifflin
- Publication date: 2000
- Publication place: United States
- Pages: 32 pages
- ISBN: 978-0-395-96867-3
- OCLC: 41565182
- Dewey Decimal: [E] 21
- LC Class: PZ7.J6316355 He 2000

Henry Hikes to Fitchburg is the first book of a series of five picture books by D.B. Johnson based on Henry David Thoreau. The book was published by Houghton Mifflin Company in 2000.

Every Henry book has an author's note saying which passage by Thoreau inspired this particular book.

== Henry Hikes To Fitchburg ==
The first Henry book was published in February 2000 and was inspired by a passage from Henry David Thoreau's Walden. The book received overall enthusiastic reviews, with the New York Times calling it the "Best Illustrated Children's Book of the Year." It also won the 2000 Boston Globe-Horn Book Award for picture books. It went on to be on the New York Times bestseller list and to earn the Ezra Jack Keats New Writer Award for 2001.

The book is available as a hardcover and paperback edition.

Henry Hikes To Fitchburg is about two friends who have very different approaches to life. When the two agree to meet one evening in Fitchburg, which is thirty miles away, Henry decides to walk while his friend plans to work all day to earn the fare for a train ticket. Both friends are curious to see who will be the first to arrive in Fitchburg. Although Henry's friend arrives first, Henry has enjoyed the sights and nature during his walk to Fitchburg, has splashed in a river and eaten blackberries. In 2001, the book was adapted into an animated film with narration by James Naughton and produced by Weston Woods Studios.

== Henry Builds A Cabin ==
When Henry decides to build a cabin for himself in the woods, he gets some help and a lot of advice from his friends. Everyone tells him his cabin would not be big enough for him. It turns out though that Henry needs his cabin only as a shelter from the rain as he prefers to do everything else outside since he loves nature so much. In 2003, the book was made into a live-action/ animated film with narration by James Naughton and was again produced by Weston Woods.

== Henry Climbs A Mountain ==
This sequel is probably the most political book of D.B. Johnson's Henry books. Henry wants to climb a mountain. However he is stopped, when Sam, the tax collector, puts him into jail because Henry refuses to pay taxes. He states that as long as the country would tolerate slavery, he would never pay taxes at any time. But being locked up doesn’t stop Henry. He still gets to splash in rivers, swing from trees, and meet a stranger - in his imagination. He even meets a runaway slave and gives him one of his shoes.

== Henry Works ==
Henry works, but no one seems to notice because he just roams and tries to get inspiration for his book. Along his way he helps different people.

== Henry's Night ==
The most recent book in the series finds Henry unable to sleep and exploring the wonders of the night.

== Bibliography ==
- 2000 Henry Hikes To Fitchburg
- 2002 Henry Builds A Cabin
- 2003 Henry Climbs A Mountain
- 2004 Henry Works
- 2009 Henry's Night, with Linda Michelin
