= Rob Mastrianni =

American musician and park ranger

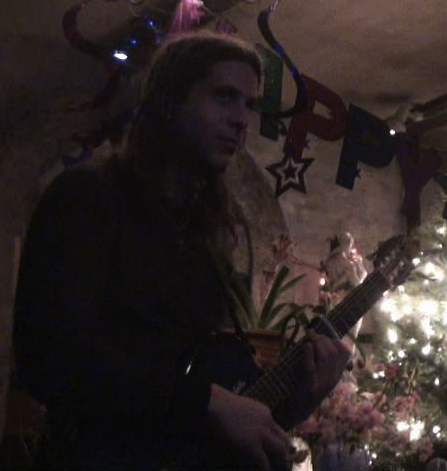
Rob Mastrianni

Rob Mastrianni is a New York City-based musician and park ranger. Many of his performances involve collaborating with local belly dancers. He most often plays a combination of electric sitar and guitars. He has also collaborated with many famous artists, and his music has been featured on The L Word.

He currently performs with the groups Next Tribe and Beatbox Guitar, with Pete List.

== Partial discography ==
Year	Artist	Album title	Comments
2007	Pete List	Songs For Kassar	also features Carmine Guida
2009	Beatbox Guitar	Beatbox Guitar	
