= The Elves and the Shoemaker =

German fairy tale

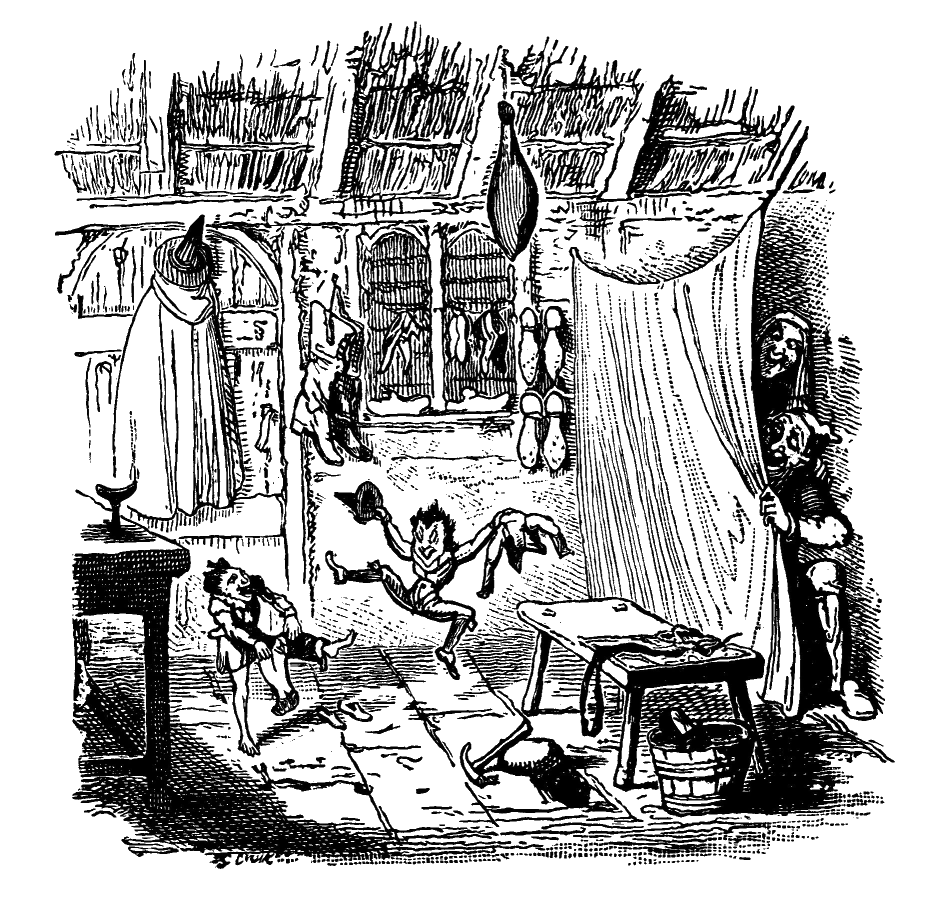
- The Elves and the Shoemaker

Folk tale
- Name: The Elves and the Shoemaker
- Aarne–Thompson grouping: AT 503* AT 476* AT 504
- Country: Germany
- Published in: Grimm's Fairy Tales

"The Elves and The Shoemaker" (German: Die Wichtelmänner) is a set of fairy tales collected by the Brothers Grimm (KHM 39) about a poor shoemaker who receives much-needed help from three helpful young elves.

The original story is the first of three fairy tales contained as entry 39 in the German Grimm's Fairy Tales under the common title "Die Wichtelmänner". In her translation of 1884 Margaret Hunt chose The Elves as title for these three stories.

The first tale is of Aarne-Thompson (AT) type 503* ("Helpful Elves"), also classified as a migratory legend (AT-7015). The second is of AT 476* type ("A Widwife [or Godmother] for the Elves"), also categorized as a migratory legend (AT 5070). The third tale is of AT 504 type ("The Changeling"), also categorized as a migratory legend (AT 5085).

== Origin ==
The set of related tales was published by the Brothers Grimm in the first edition of Kinder- und Hausmärchen (1812), as tale no. 39. Their versions of the three stories are based upon the accounts of Gretchen Wild (1787–1819).

In the first edition, the three stories are subtitled "The Shoemaker for Whom They Did Work", "The Servant Girl Who Stood In as Godmother for Them", and "The Woman Whose Child They Exchanged", respectively, although the Grimms did not give titles to the individual tales in later editions.

== Story ==
=== First tale ===
A poor hardworking shoemaker had so little leather that he could only make a single pair of shoes. One evening, leaving the pair with the work unfinished, he went to bed and commended himself to God. After waking up the following day and saying his prayers, he found the shoes finished and perfectly well-made on his workbench. A customer soon entered the store and offered more than the usual price, for he was fond of the pair. The shoemaker uses the money to buy leather for more shoes which, after cutting, he also leaves overnight. Again the materials are made into beautiful shoes by morning. In this manner, his situation improves until he is comfortable again.

One evening, shortly before Christmas, the shoemaker said to his wife, "Why don't we stay up tonight and see who is giving us this helping hand," and his wife agreed. Hiding in the corner of the room, they saw two little men working quickly and nimbly on the shoes, then running away after their work was finished.

The next morning, his wife said, "The little men have made us wealthy. We must show them our thanks. They are running around with nothing on, freezing." She proposed to make clothes, and the shoemaker agreed to make a pair of shoes for each of them. The two of them did not stop until they had finished the work, then hid themselves again. The following night, the couple saw the little men delighted as they tried the beautiful little clothes and shoes; they danced out of the house and never returned, but the shoemaker prospered in his business.

=== Second tale ===
A poor hardworking servant girl was sweeping out the house and shaking the sweepings onto a large pile when she found a letter on the pile. Since she could not read, the servant took the letter to her masters. They told her that she had been invited to an elf baptism and asked to become the godmother of the child. The girl hesitated at first, but her master finally convinced her to accept.

Then the servant girl was led by the elves to their hollow mountain, where everything was smaller but also more splendidly ornamented. The girl helped with the baptism and asked to leave, but the elves convinced her to stay three days with them. The elves did everything to make her happy during those three days, but the girl again asked to leave. The little men gave her gold and let her leave their mountain. When she returned home, the servant girl learned that she did not spend three days with elves but seven years. Meanwhile, her former masters had died.

=== Third tale ===
A woman had her child taken from the cradle by elves and substituted with a changeling. Her neighbour advised her to set the changeling on the hearth, make a fire, and boil water in two eggshells: that should make the changeling laugh, and if he laughs it will be all over with him. The woman did everything her neighbour had said, and the changeling started to laugh about her cooking in shells. Then a band of little elves suddenly appeared, brought the rightful child, set it on the hearth, and took the changeling away.

== "Elves" ==
Although the supernatural creatures are translated as "elves" in English, they are called Wichtelmänner ('Wicht-men') in the German original. Wicht is cognate with wight in English and vættr in Old Norse, all stemming from Proto-Germanic *wihtiz or *wehtiz ('thing, creature').

== Cultural legacy ==
The first tale has been widely adapted.

Walter Lantz created an animated short musical adaptation of the story with his 1934 Jolly Little Elves, as did Friz Freleng with his 1946 Merrie Melodies short Holiday for Shoestrings, and Tex Avery with his 1950 MGM short The Peachy Cobbler. The 1956 Looney Tunes cartoon short Yankee Dood It is based on this fairy tale, with Elmer Fudd as the king of industrial elves. One hundred fifty years after this fairy tale took place, he visits the shoemaker to retrieve the elves he has employed, while also imparting the virtues of mass production capitalism to him.

The 1962 film The Wonderful World of the Brothers Grimm features a segment based on the story. In the 1994 Due South episode, "The Deal", Det. Ray Vecchio vaguely recollects this story when talking with Constable Benton Fraser about a poor cobbler. In Cinderella: From Fabletown with Love, a spinoff miniseries of the Vertigo comic-book series Fables, the shoemaker appears as an employee in Cinderella's shoe store, while the elves are the builders and suppliers of the store's inventory.

Muppet Classic Theater had a version where a shoemaker (played by Kermit the Frog) faces ruin until his livelihood is saved by a group of philanthropic entertainers, The Elvises, who, naturally, make only blue suede shoes. In a Barney & Friends episode called "If the Shoe Fits...", the kids are rehearsing for their play about this story. The second season of the animated series Happily Ever After: Fairy Tales for Every Child features a South American twist of the tale. In the Harry Potter series of books, "house elves" are enslaved creatures who take care of the needs of human wizards, and are free of their obligation once given clothes. In the TV show Supernatural, the season 6 episode "Clap Your Hands If You Believe" has a variation of the tale, of a watchmaker and some fairies.

In Jane Shields and Rosemary Doyle's The Shoemaker and the Pantomimes, Cinderella goes looking for elves to help her father in his obligation to the evil designer Kenneth Coal, but all she ends up with are Mimes, a resourceful mother Twanky, and an even more resourceful cat. Premiered Red Sandcastle Theatre, Toronto, 2012. The fairytale is alluded to in two episodes of The Big Bang Theory: in "The Extract Obliteration", Leonard Hofstadter mentions it to Penny after he does her essay for her, and in "The Bus Pants Utilization", Sheldon greets Leonard in the morning with "Good morning, Shoemaker", in reference to the fact that he has been up all night working on Leonard's differential equations app project. In the 2003 Christmas movie Elf, shoemaking is one of the jobs for elves.

Jim La Marche retold and illustrated his version of the story in 2003, published by Chronicle Books.

The Grimm Variations, a 2024 Netflix anime series, features a retelling of the story. This version features a struggling novelist who wakes up to find someone has completed stories he was writing. One of the books written is entitled The Elves and the Shoemaker.

== See also ==
- Grimms' Fairy Tales
