= Robert Bright =

American writer (1902–1988)

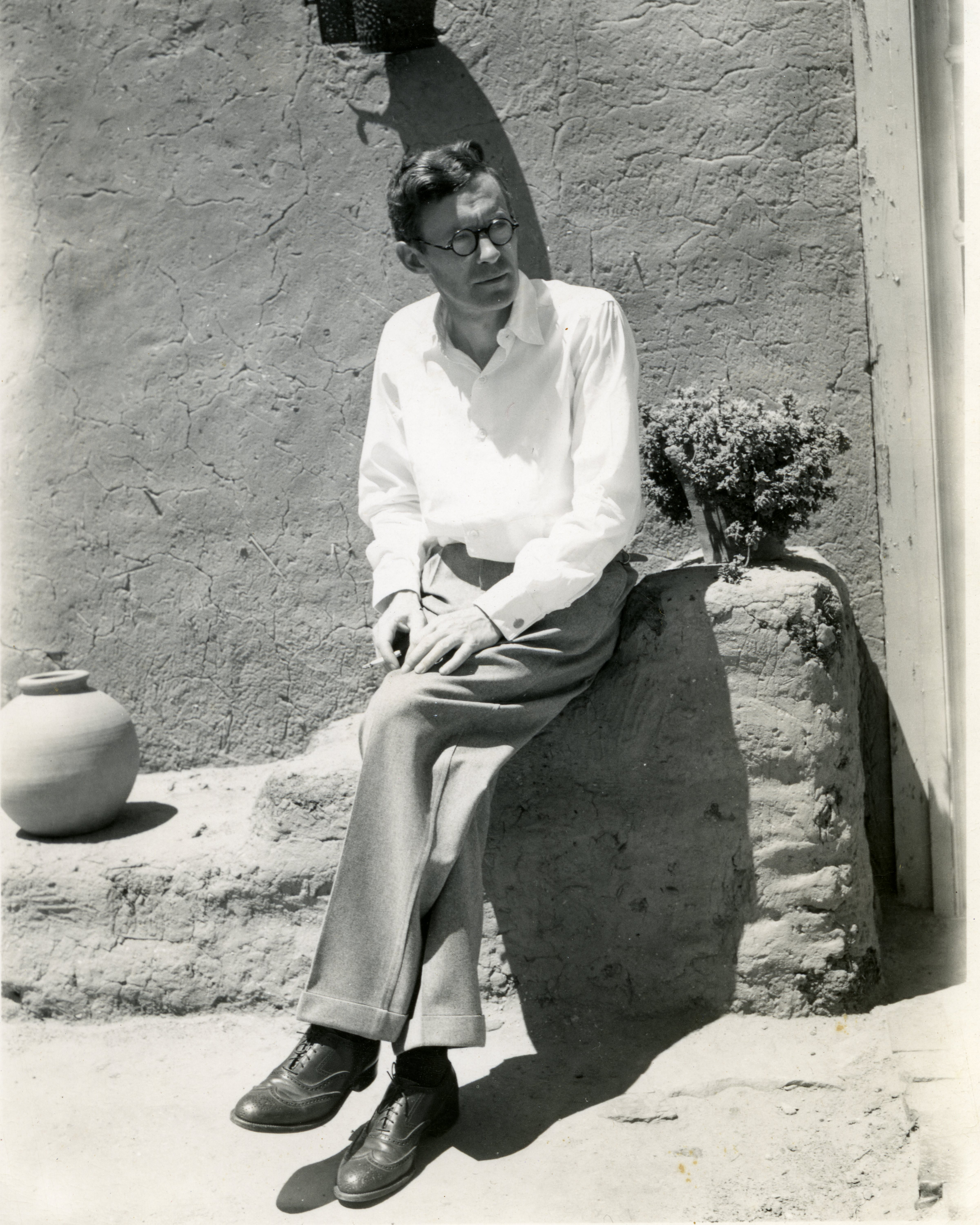
Author and illustrator, Robert Bright

Robert Bright (August 5, 1902 – November 21, 1988) was an American writer and illustrator of children's literature who wrote and illustrated over 20 books in his 40-year career. He is best known for Georgie (1944), a children's classic about a friendly and shy little ghost who lives in Mr. and Mrs. Whittaker's attic.

== Life ==
Bright was born in Sandwich, Massachusetts to Edward Bright and Blanche Denio Wright of New York City. His father was a journalist and his mother was the daughter of Ebenezer Kellogg Wright, president of the National Park Bank in New York City.

In 1903, the family moved to Germany where Robert Bright's father attended the University of Göttingen to study mathematics. Robert Bright attended the Vorschule and the Oberrealschule and spoke English only at home. In 1914, at the onset of World War I, Bright and his mother and brother were vacationing in England but Bright's father, Edward, was still in Germany where he was helping students to flee the country. He was arrested as an English spy and was incarcerated in a basement room opposite the Göttingen City Hall for nine months.

At the end of Edward Bright's incarceration in Germany, the family returned to the United States where Robert Bright attended grammar school at Buckingham Browne & Nichols and Phillips Academy Andover. After graduating in 1921, Bright attended Princeton University and graduated in 1925. There he majored in English and won a competition to the Princeton Press Club which allowed him to write columns for various city newspapers including the New York World, The Baltimore Sun, The Philadelphia Ledger, The Boston Transcript and The Standard News Association.

In January 1926, Bright moved to Paris and joined the staff of The Paris Times, an independent newspaper. He worked with the editor, Gaston Archambault, who later served The New York Times as a distinguished war correspondent. In 1927, Bright returned to New York City where he worked for Conde Nast Publications. He then worked in advertising for Revillon Freres, a French Fur house established in 1723.

At the urging of friend Frieda Lawrence, Bright moved with his wife, Katherine, and two young children to Taos, New Mexico in 1938. There, the Brights lived in a simple adobe house in Rio Chiquito on four acres of land where they grew their own food and raised chickens for eggs and meat. In New Mexico, the Brights became friends with many of the writers and painters who established a colony there in the 1930s, among them were W.H. Auden, Andrew Dasburg and Georgia O'Keeffe.

Life in New Mexico inspired Bright's second Novel The Life and Death of Little Jo published in England by Cresset Press which was very well received by reviewers and the public. Bright also began writing books for children. While the family was vacationing in Laguna Beach, California, Bright caught his children peering under their bed. As it turns out, they were looking for the little ghost that lived in the house. This moment was the inspiration for the Georgie The Ghost series of books, which has become a beloved classic worldwide. Bright's grandchildren have also inspired his books and appear as characters in Georgie's Christmas Carol.

Robert Bright died of cancer in his home in San Francisco, California in 1988.

== Books ==
- The Travels of Ching - published 1943
- The Intruders - published 1943
- The Life and Death of Little Jo — published 1944
- Georgie — published 1944 (9 editions)
- The Olivers - published 1947
- Me and the Bears — published 1951
- Hurrah For Freddie! -published in 1953
- Miss Pattie -published in 1954
- I Like Red -published 1955
- Georgie to the Rescue — published 1956 (4 editions)
- The Friendly Bear — published 1957 (3 editions)
- Richard Brown and The Dragon -published 1957
- Georgie's Halloween — published 1958 (5 editions)
- Which is Willy? - published 1962
- Georgie and the Robbers — published 1963 (7 editions)
- Georgie and the Magician — published 1966 (3 editions)
- My Hopping Bunny — published 1967
- Gregory: the Noisiest and Strongest Boy in Grangers Grove — published 1969
- Georgie and the Noisy Ghost — published 1971 (3 editions)
- Georgie Goes West — published 1973 (2 editions)
- Georgie's Christmas Carol — published 1975 (2 editions)
- Georgie and the Buried Treasure - published 1979 (2 editions)
- Georgie and the Runaway Balloon — published 1983
- Georgie and the Ball of Yarn — published 1983
- Georgie and the Little Dog — published 1983
- Georgie and the Baby Birds — published 1983
- My Red Umbrella — published 1959 (2 editions)
- Slightly Scary Stories for Halloween (by Robert Bright, Edward Marshall, James Stevenson, Barbara K. Walker)— published 2007 — 2 editions

Georgie and Georgie to the Rescue became motion pictures issued by Weston Woods Studios and Sterling Educational Films, respectively.
