= Inch by Inch (children's book) =

1961 Caldecott picture book

- Author: Leo Lionni
- Publisher: Obolensky, HarperCollins
- Publication date: 1960
- Pages: unpaged
- Awards: Caldecott Honor

Inch by Inch is a 1960 picture book written and illustrated by Leo Lionni. The book tells the story of an inchworm who likes to measure everything. The book was a recipient of a 1961 Caldecott Honor for its illustrations.

The original version of Inch by Inch had no page numbers. This book was also published by Astor-Honor and Scholastic Book Services in 1960; most of these versions had page numbers and 26 pages.

== Adaptation into film ==
In 2006, Weston Woods Studios adapted Inch by Inch into an animated film narrated by Ron McLarty. It was an ALA Notable Recording in 2007.
