= Karl Larsson (artist) =

American painter

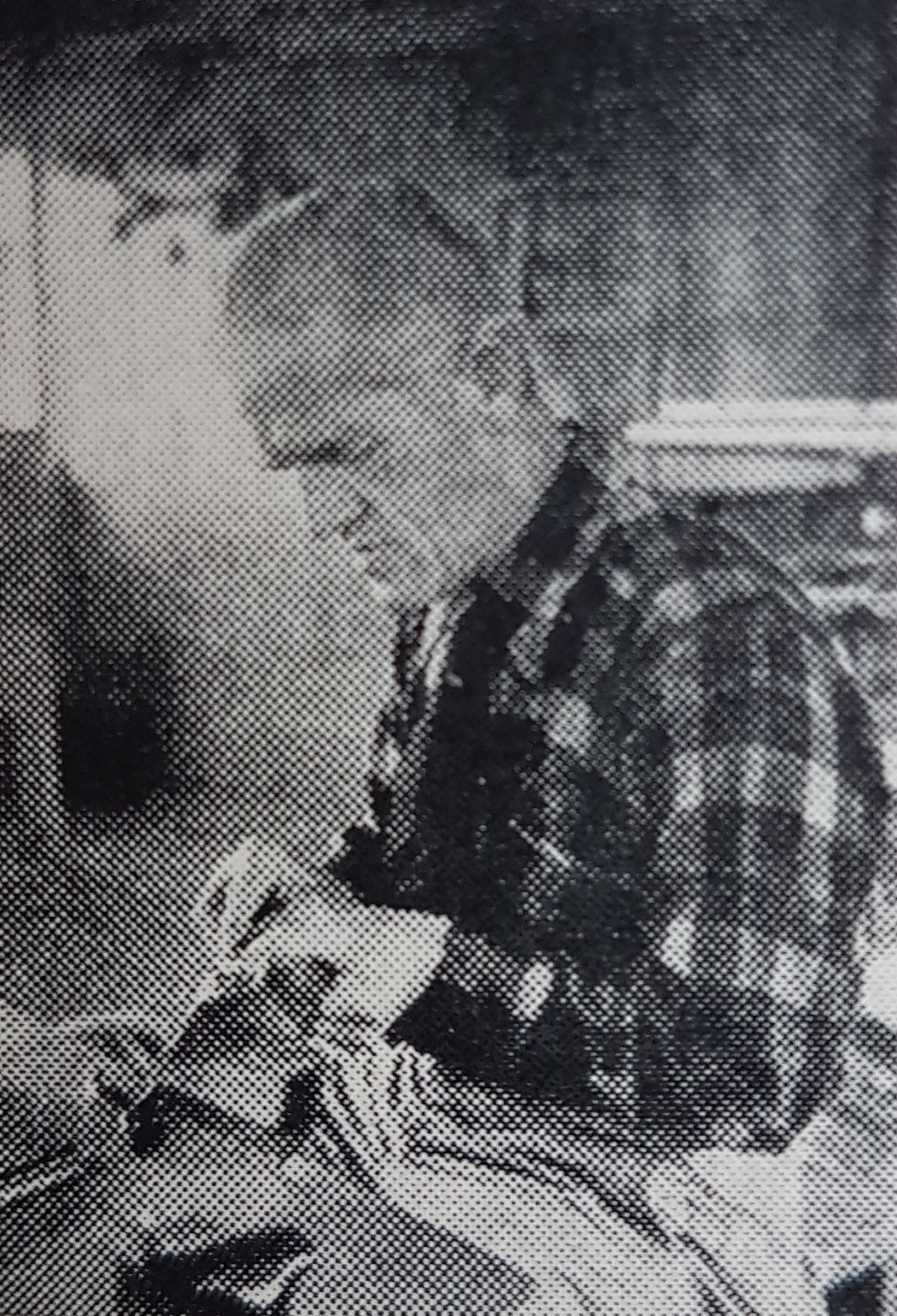
Karl Larsson, photographed portrait image from Allhem's Swedish Artists Lexicon.

Karl Larsson (September 16, 1893 – June 1, 1967) was a Swedish-born American artist, known as an engraver, painter, and sculptor.

== Biography ==
Karl Larsson was born in Skövde, Sweden. He emigrated to America in 1913. He was a painter, sculptor, engraver, muralist, and illustrator who studied at the Art Students League in New York City and was a member of the American Watercolor Society. He was represented at the Gothenburg Exhibition (1923). In 1924, he exhibited with the Society of Independent Artists in New York City. He also illustrated children's books, including those authored by his wife Marjorie Flack (1897–1958).

He later lived in Santa Fe, New Mexico where he completed a mural for the Chapel of Lady of Guadalupe Church in Jemez Springs, New Mexico. He also created silver sculptures in churches in Tucson, Fort Defiance, and Phoenix, Arizona. He died in 1967 at Dobbs Ferry, New York.
