= Angus and the Ducks =

1930 children's book by Marjorie Flack

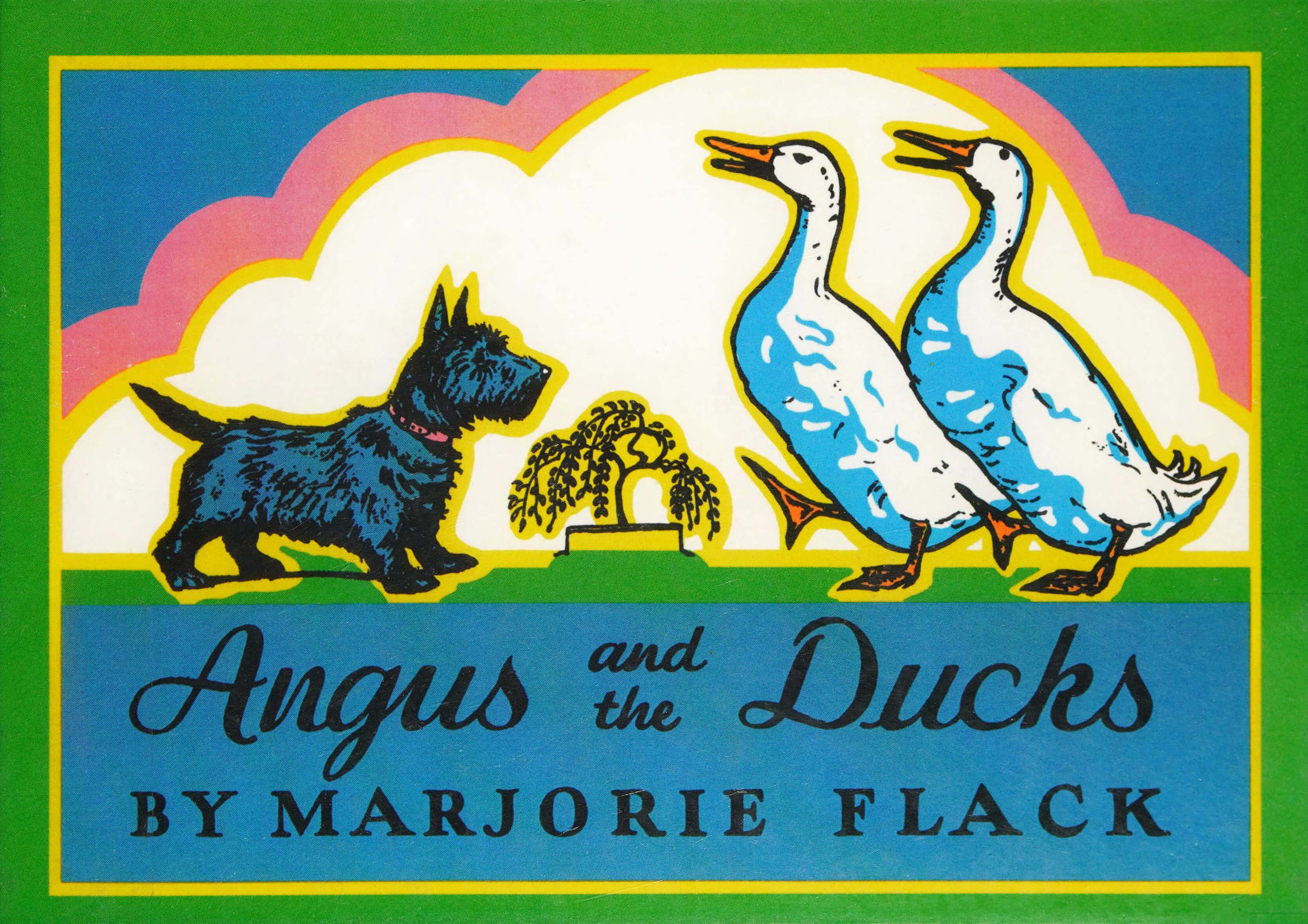
Book cover of Angus and the Ducks

Angus and the Ducks is a 1930 American children's picture book written and illustrated by Marjorie Flack and published by Doubleday & Company. It is about an encounter between a Scottish Terrier named Angus and two ducks, a "true story" according to Flack.

The book was followed by four sequels: Angus and the Cat (1931), Angus Lost (1932), Wag-Tail Bess (1933, also known as Angus and Wag-Tail Bess), and Topsy (1935, also known as Angus and Topsy). Louise Seaman Bechtel noted the series' "clever relation of words to pictures; fine simplicity of both."

In 1997 the book was adapted for video by Weston Woods Studios.
