= Golem (Wisniewski book) =

Book by David Wisniewski

- Author: David Wisniewski
- Illustrator: David Wisniewski
- Genre: Children's picture book
- Publisher: Clarion Books
- Publication date: 1996
- Publication place: United States
- ISBN: 978-0-395-72618-1
- OCLC: 247228570
- Dewey Decimal: 398.21/089924 E 20
- LC Class: BM531 .W57 1996

Golem is a 1996 picture book written and illustrated by David Wisniewski. With illustrations made of cut-paper collages, it is Wisniewski's retelling of the Jewish folktale of the Golem with a one-page background at the end.

== Plot ==
In the year 1580 in Prague, the Jews are being persecuted over the Blood Lie. Judah Loew ben Bezalel, the town rabbi, decides to construct a Golem in an effort to protect his people. With the help of his student Yakov Sassoon and son-in-law Itzak Kohen, Rabbi Loew constructs a lifeless golem and brings it to life. Naming the Golem "Joseph", Rabbi Loew instructs him to bring those spreading misinformation over the Blood Lie to justice each night.

For days, the Golem carries out his tasks successfully, but Rabbi Loew becomes concerned when the Golem steadily grows distracted by everyday happenings. Once the Golem stops the persecution, an enraged mob of the Jews' enemies stage a raid upon the ghetto. When summoned to action, the Golem, steadily growing taller, fights off the attackers, but causes extreme damage and violence in the process. The emperor of Prague summons Rabbi Loew and agrees to safeguard the Jews if Rabbi Loew destroys the Golem; Rabbi Loew agrees on the condition that the Golem returns if necessary. Afterwards, Rabbi Loew uses his power to revert the unwilling Golem to his previous lifeless state as a heap of clay. The ending is ambiguous, ending with the words: "But many say he could awaken. Perhaps, when the desperate need for justice is united with holy purpose, Golem will come to life once more."

== Awards ==
The book won the Caldecott Medal in 1997.

Awards
Preceded by Officer Buckle and Gloria	Caldecott Medal recipient 1997	Succeeded by Rapunzel
