= The Pigeon Wants a Puppy! =

2008 children's picture book by Mo Willems

- Front cover, designed by Mo Willems
- Author: Mo Willems
- Illustrator: Mo Willems
- Language: English
- Subject: Children's literature, Picture book
- Published: 2008 (Hyperion Books for Children, New York)
- Publication place: United States
- Media type: Print (hardback, paperback)
- Pages: 36 (unpaginated)
- ISBN: 978-1-4231-0960-0
- OCLC: 213407281
- Preceded by: Don't Let the Pigeon Stay Up Late!
- Followed by: The Duckling Gets a Cookie!?

The Pigeon Wants a Puppy! is a 2008 children's picture book by Mo Willems. Published by Hyperion Books, it is about The Pigeon who really wants a puppy, but later has second thoughts about that idea.

== Reception ==
Booklist, reviewing The Pigeon Wants a Puppy!, wrote "Willems skillfully executes the formula that made previous Pigeon titles so popular: minimal artwork that places all the attention on the cajoling little bird, whose words and body language will strike a chord of familiarity with every child. Once again, kids will reach the story's end wondering what Pigeon will want next." The School Library Journal wrote "Kids will love this perfectly paced picture book, which offers both the expected (breaking the fourth wall, Pigeon's classic temper tantrum) and a new twist (Pigeon actually gets what he wants? Impossible!). Willems's hilariously expressive illustrations and engaging text are cinematic in their interplay. Maybe kids won't appreciate the genius behind it the way adults will, but that won't stop them from asking for this book again and again."

The Pigeon Wants a Puppy! has also been reviewed by The New York Times, Publishers Weekly, Kirkus Reviews, and The Bulletin of the Center for Children's Books.

== See also ==
- Don't Let the Pigeon Drive the Bus!
- The Pigeon Finds a Hot Dog!
- Don't Let the Pigeon Stay Up Late!
- The Duckling Gets a Cookie!?
