= That is NOT a Good Idea! =

2013 picture book by Mo Willems

That is NOT a good idea!
- Author: Mo Willems
- Illustrator: Mo Willems
- Language: English
- Subject: Children's literature, Picture book
- Published: 2013 (Balzer + Bray)
- Publication place: United States
- Media type: Print (hardback, paperback)
- Pages: 44
- ISBN: 9780062203090
- OCLC: 839435699

That Is NOT a Good Idea! is a 2013 children's picture book written and illustrated by Mo Willems. First published by Balzer + Bray, it is about a plump fowl that meets a fox, and is persuaded to follow the fox to its house in the woods, all the while being observed, as if on a movie screen, by a group of young birds that regularly shout the title words. Throughout the story, the baby geese try to warn their mother that she is making mistakes.

In 2015, Weston Woods Studios released a film adaptation of the book, with ragtime music by Lucas Elliot Eberl, and animated by Pete List. It won the Carnegie Medal for Excellence in Children's Videos in 2016.

== Reception ==
That is NOT a good idea! has been reviewed by a number of publications, including The Horn Book Magazine, Kirkus Reviews, and Publishers Weekly.

== Awards ==
- 2014 Bank Street CBC Best Children's Book of the Year (Five to Nine) - Outstanding Merit
- 2014 CCBC Choice
- 2014 Cream of the Crop List
- 2014 Irma Black Award - winner
