= Andy and the Lion =

1938 picture book by James Daugherty

- First edition
- Author: James Daugherty
- Illustrator: James Daugherty
- Cover artist: James Daugherty
- Language: English
- Genre: Picture book
- Published: 1938 by The Viking Press
- Publication place: United States
- Media type: Print
- Pages: 80 pp
- Awards: Caldecott Honor Book, 1939
- ISBN: 978-0-6701-2433-6
- OCLC: 357682
- Dewey Decimal: 813.52
- LC Class: PZ8.2.D27

Andy and the Lion, written and illustrated by James Daugherty, is a 1938 picture book published by Puffin Books. Andy and the Lion was a Caldecott Medal Honor Book for 1939 and was Daugherty's first Caldecott Honor Medal of a total of two during his career. Daughetry won another Caldecott Honor in 1957 for Gillespie and the Guards, which he both authored and Illustrated. Andy and the Lion was re-issued by Viking Press in 1967 in hardcover format. It was the fifteenth printing of March 1967. A modern retelling of the Androcles And The Lion common folktale about a young boy who loves to read about lions.

== Description ==
The story, written by Daugherty, is told in past tense from a second person point of view (a second-person narrative). It is written and illustrated by James Daugherty. There are illustrations on every page. The illustrations are in a gold color. The story is 80 pages long.

== Synopsis ==
A little boy named Andy is so interested in lions that he goes to the library and searches for a book about lions. That same night, his grandfather tells him a bedtime story about lions. Andy is so fascinated by the story that he has a dream about lions that same night. The next day, on his way to school, Andy meets a real lion. The lion has a thorn stuck in his paw and Andy helps pull the thorn out. This action makes Andy and the lion friends. Later in the story, a circus comes to Andy's town and of course, Andy attends. During the lion act, one of the lions jumps out of the cage, into the audience, right in front of Andy. Andy thinks it's the last day of his life. But lo and behold, it is his friend the lion, the very same one Andy had helped earlier to take the thorn out of his paw. Andy and the lion rejoice in the excitement of seeing one another again. When the crowd attempts to capture the lion, Andy protects it. The next day, there is a parade, and Andy and the lion are in the lead. Andy receives an award for bravery. At the end of the story, Andy returns the book about lions that he borrowed from the library, pulling his friend the lion behind him.

== Spencer Collection ==
The New York Public Library Spencer Collection is home to James Daugherty original drawings, first published in 1938.

== See also ==
- 1938 in literature
- Children's Literature
- Picture Books
