= Hondo & Fabian =

2002 children's book by Peter McCarty

- Author: Peter McCarty
- Language: English
- Series: Hondo & Fabian
- Genre: children's books picture books
- Publisher: Henry Holt & Co.
- Publication date: 2002
- Publication place: United States
- Pages: 40
- ISBN: 978-0-8050-6352-3
- OCLC: 46683851
- Dewey Decimal: [E] 21
- LC Class: PZ10.3.M12685 Ho 2002
- Followed by: Fabian Escapes

Hondo & Fabian is a children's picture book written and illustrated by Peter McCarty. It was released by Henry Holt & Co. in 2002 for ages 2–5. The book follows a day in the life of a dog, Hondo, and a cat, Fabian. Hondo goes on an adventure to the beach and Fabian stays at home with the baby. The story is told through minimal and simple present-tense text and complemented with warm and soft illustrations drawn in pencil and watercolor. Hondo & Fabian was very well received and was recognized with multiple awards including a Caldecott Honor. A sequel, Fabian Escapes, was released in 2007.

== Plot ==
The characters included in this book are Hondo the dog, Fabian the cat, a little girl referred to as “the baby,” and Fred - Hondo’s friend who is also a dog. The book begins with Hondo and Fabian asleep at home, Fabian on the windowsill and Hondo on the floor. The pets are awakened and the reader is informed that Hondo will have an adventure and Fabian will stay home. Hondo heads to the beach in a 1940s-style car with his head out the window and his ears flapping in the wind. At the beach, he meets Fred and they run around in the sand and jump in the waves together. Meanwhile, Fabian is at home “playing” with the baby, depicted by an illustration of a small girl standing up and holding the cat. Fabian then escapes the grasp of the baby and moves to the bathroom to pull apart a roll of toilet paper. At the beach, Hondo gets hungry and wishes that he could take fish from a bucket that a fisherman has just caught. At home, Fabian is also hungry and wishes he could eat a turkey sandwich sitting on the counter. Hondo then returns from the beach in time for dinner and the two pets eat their food side by side. Fabian returns to the windowsill and Hondo returns to the floor where they fall asleep for the night. The book concludes with an illustration of the little girl in bed and text that reads “Good night, baby!”.

== Illustrations ==
Hondo & Fabian is known for its unique illustrations drawn in pencil and watercolor. The illustrations show the world of Hondo and Fabian with soft and fuzzy edges. Peter McCarty draws Hondo in shades of brown, cream, and white and Fabian in white with gray and dark gray stripes on the top of his back and head. The book consists of warm, sepia-toned pages, with each illustration having its own page with minimal text on the blank page next to it.

== Reception ==
Hondo & Fabian received many positive reviews and won a Caldecott Honor, which is given to the runners-up for the Caldecott medal awarded by the Association for Library Service to Children (ALSC). The book was one of three recipients of the Caldecott Honor in 2003. The book received positive reviews from Booklist, Kirkus Reviews, and the New York Times. Hondo & Fabian was recognized in both the New York Times Best Illustrated Books of 2002 and the New York Times Notable Children’s Books of 2002. The book was also on the list of Notable Children’s Books of 2003 by the ALSC. In 2006, Weston Woods Studios released a short animation of Hondo & Fabian, narrated by Jeff Brooks. Following the positive reception of Hondo & Fabian, McCarty wrote a sequel titled Fabian Escapes in 2007.
