= Marjorie Flack =

American artist and writer

Marjorie Flack (October 22, 1897 - August 29, 1958) was an American artist and writer of children's picture books. She was born in Greenport, Long Island, New York in 1897. She was best known for The Story about Ping (1933), illustrated by Kurt Wiese, popularized by Captain Kangaroo, and for her stories of an insatiably curious Scottish Terrier named Angus, who was actually her dog. Her first marriage was to artist Karl Larsson; she later married poet William Rose Benét.

Her book Angus Lost was featured prominently in the film Ask the Dust (2006), starring Colin Farrell and Salma Hayek, in which Farrell's character teaches Hayek's character, a Mexican, to read English using Flack's book.

Flack's grandson, Tim Barnum, and his wife, Darlene Enix-Barnum, currently sponsor an annual creative writing award at Anne Arundel Community College. The Marjorie Flack Award for Fiction consists of a $250 prize for the best short story or children's storybook written by a current AACC student.

== Bibliography ==
- The Story about Ping (1933), The Viking Press. Illustrated by Kurt Wiese
- Ask Mr. Bear
- Angus and the Ducks (1930)
- Angus and the Cat (1931)
- Angus Lost (1932)
- "Christopher" (1935)
- The Country Bunny and the Little Gold Shoes (illustrator, 1939; with DuBose Heyward, writer)
- Walter, the Lazy Mouse
- Up In The Air, illustrated by Karl Larsson
- The Boats on the River, illustrated by Jay Hyde Barnum
- Wait for William
- Lucky little Lena (c1937, published by the Macmillan Company, 1940)
- Tim Tadpole and the Great Bullfrog
- Neighbors on the Hill
- The Restless Robin (1937)
- Angus and Wagtail Bess
- All around the town: The story of a boy in New York
- Humphrey: One Hundred Years Along the Wayside with a Box Turtle
- Angus and Topsy (first published in Great Britain in 1935)
- Pedro (1940)

== Awards ==
- Caldecott Honor, for The Boats on the River, 1947
