= The Pigeon Finds a Hot Dog! =

2004 picture book by Mo Willems

- Front cover
- Author: Mo Willems
- Illustrator: Mo Willems
- Language: English
- Subject: Children's literature, Picture book
- Published: 2004 (Hyperion Books for Children)
- Publication place: United States
- Media type: Print (hardback, paperback)
- Pages: 36 (unpaginated)
- ISBN: 978-0-7868-1869-3
- OCLC: 52587780
- Preceded by: Don't Let the Pigeon Drive the Bus!
- Followed by: Don't Let the Pigeon Stay Up Late!

The Pigeon Finds a Hot Dog! is a 2004 children's picture book written and illustrated by Mo Willems. It is about the Pigeon that comes across a hot dog, and eventually shares it with a duckling. In 2010, an animated version of the book, narrated by Mo and Trix Willems, and animated by Pete List, was released by Weston Woods Studio.

== Reception ==
Booklist, reviewing The Pigeon Finds a Hot Dog!, wrote "Once again, Willems uses artistic minimalism (each page shows only the birds and the hot dog, rendered in basic lines) and spare, hilarious dialogue to convey surprisingly realistic emotions. Preschoolers who recognized themselves in the tantrum-throwing pigeon of the previous title will also see themselves in the calm, shrewd duckling that knows just how to get his way." and the School Library Journal wrote "Children, especially those with younger siblings, will have come up with this obvious solution long before the pigeon does. Willems's deceptively simple cartoon drawings convincingly portray his protagonist's emotional dilemma, from his initial joy to his frustration and struggle over what he wants to do versus what he knows is right."

The Horn Book Magazine's review noted "Cartoonist Willems is as adept at depicting the daily dramas in a child's life as he is in using subtle changes in line to convey shifting emotions. The book's clean, minimalist design lets the duckling/pigeon performance take center stage, and the dialogue between the two is played for maximum laughs. Maybe the pigeon's shtick isn't as original this time around, but he's such an engaging character that it's still a treat to see him again."

The Pigeon Finds a Hot Dog! has also been reviewed by the following publications: Publishers Weekly, Kirkus Reviews, The Guardian, and The New York Times.

Children have called it a favorite book, and it won a 2008 Golden Archer Award.

== See also ==
- Don't Let the Pigeon Drive the Bus!
- The Pigeon Wants a Puppy!
- Don't Let the Pigeon Stay Up Late!
- The Duckling Gets a Cookie!?
