= Leonardo, the Terrible Monster =

2005 picture book by Mo Willems

- Front cover, designed by Mo Willems
- Author: Mo Willems
- Cover artist: Willems
- Language: English
- Genre: children's books picture books
- Publisher: Hyperion Books
- Publication date: 2005
- Publication place: United States
- Pages: 44
- ISBN: 978-0-7868-5294-9
- OCLC: 60822832
- Dewey Decimal: [E] 22
- LC Class: PZ7.W65535 You 2005

Leonardo, the Terrible Monster (known on the front cover as Your Pal Mo Willems Presents: Leonardo, the Terrible Monster) is a children's picture book written and illustrated by Mo Willems. An ALA Notable Book, it was released in 2005 by Hyperion Books. In 2007, Weston Woods adapted the book to an animated film, directed by Pete List.

== Plot ==
Leonardo is truly a terrible monster - terrible at being a monster, that is. No matter how hard he tries, he can't seem to frighten anyone. Determined to succeed, Leonardo sets himself to training and research. Finally, he finds a nervous little boy, and scares the tuna salad out of him! But scaring people isn't quite as satisfying as he thought it would be. Leonardo realizes that he might be a terrible, awful monster-but he could be a really good friend.

== Reception ==
Kirkus Reviews called it a "sweetly original morality play about a very unscary monster", while Publishers Weekly wrote " Willems's (Don't Let the Pigeon Drive the Bus! ) finale feels apt but syrupy; Leonardo's decision to be nice seems homiletic. Yet this is an appealing book, sketched in dark brown against grayish pastel backdrops, with evergreen lettering and highlighted keywords."

It is listed in the 2009 literary reference book 1001 Children's Books You Must Read Before You Grow Up.

== Sequel ==
In 2017, the sequel, Sam, the Most Scaredy-Cat Kid in the Whole World, was released.
