= The Pigeon Needs a Bath! =

Children's book by Mo Willems

- Author: Mo Willems
- Cover artist: Willems
- Language: English
- Series: Pigeon
- Genre: Children's Book
- Published: April 1, 2014
- Publisher: Hyperion Books
- Publication place: United States
- Pages: 40
- ISBN: 978-1-4231-9087-5
- Preceded by: The Duckling Gets a Cookie!?
- Followed by: The Pigeon HAS to Go to School!

The Pigeon Needs a Bath! is a children's book by Mo Willems. Published by Hyperion Books for Children in 2014, it is about a pigeon that is filthy because he needs a bath.

== Awards ==
The book was an ALA Notable Children's Book for 2015.

== Reception ==
Kirkus wrote: "All the elements are in place, including page backgrounds that modulate from dirty browns to fresh, clean colors and endpapers that bookend the story (including a very funny turnabout for the duckling, here a rubber bath toy)." and "Willems' formula is still a winner." Publishers Weekly wrote: "Somewhere between aspirations of locomotion, pining for a puppy, and scrambling to finish an activity book, the Pigeon got pretty dirty. Don't tell him that, though. In enduring Willems style, the Pigeon invites reader participation through questions, provocations, and wild gesticulations." The School Library Journal wrote: "With a polished technique that logically approaches the problem, Pigeon speaks with a child's voice as he rationalizes his decision while forcefully questioning those who might even suggest that his personal hygiene and the flies buzzing around are not just "coincidental." The water might be "too hot…not deep enough…too cold…or too wet," but it only takes a mere 30 tiny frames and a dramatic large-font spread before Pigeon grandly displays the myriad possibilities for a happy bird in the bath."
