= Good Night, Gorilla =

1994 children's book by Peggy Rathmann

- Book cover
- Author: Peggy Rathmann
- Illustrator: Peggy Rathmann
- Language: English
- Genre: Children's literature
- Publisher: Putnam
- Publication date: 1994
- Publication place: United States
- Pages: 40
- ISBN: 9780590972697

Good Night, Gorilla is a 1994 children's book about an unobservant zookeeper who is followed home at night by the animals from his zoo. The book was written and illustrated by Peggy Rathmann, and tells the story almost entirely with pictures. Good Night, Gorilla was published by Putnam and has sold more than 3 million copies. It has been honored with awards from the American Library Association and the Children's Literature Association.

== Plot ==
The story takes place in a zoo as a zookeeper named Joe goes on his final evening rounds of the zoo and a house mouse that holds a banana on his hand. Unbeknownst to Joe, a sneaky western gorilla pickpockets the keys, and follows Joe through the zoo to quietly unlock each cage. As the zookeeper walks through the zoo and to his house, he is trailed by zoo animals including an African bush elephant, reticulated giraffe, spotted hyena, nine-banded armadillo and African lion. The animals follow Joe inside his house and into his bed, where Joe's wife says good night to him. She is then surprised to hear the uninvited animals respond, and Joe's wife leads them back to the zoo.

== Writing and publication ==
Peggy Rathmann was inspired by summer memories from childhood: "When I was little, the highlight of the summer was running barefoot through the grass, in the dark, screaming ... We played kick-the-can, and three-times-around-the-house, and sometimes we just stood staring into other people's windows, wondering what it would be like to go home to someone else's house."

Rathmann wrote Good Night, Gorilla as part of a children's book writing and illustration class at the Otis Parsons School of Design in Los Angeles taught Rathmann stated that the first half of the book came quickly whereas the second half took two years. Initially, the story ended with the discovery of the gorilla in bed with the zookeeper and his wife, but Rathmann worked on alternate endings. She said: "My editor, Arthur Levine, invented the 'eyeballs page' and my art director, Nanette Stevenson, wisely suggested that the zookeeper's wife take a leadership role." Levine called Good Night, Gorilla "one of my favorite books from my whole career," and credits Rathmann's ability to "combine warmth and humor" and "tell both plots and subplots in a text of incredibly few words" with the book's sustained success.

Rathmann referenced Good Night, Gorilla in the background of a page in 10 Minutes to Bedtime, which featured a drawing of the zoo animals.

== Legacy and 20th anniversary edition ==
In 2014, Good Night, Gorilla published a 20th anniversary edition. At that point, it was still in print and had sold more than 3 million copies sold, 2.5 million of which were in board book format. Rathmann tweaked some of her illustrations in the 20th anniversary edition to add a pink balloon in every picture in response at the suggestion of readers who noted the pink balloon's presence in almost every picture in the hardcover book. She also gave a toy to the lion, one animal whose cage didn't have one: "a number of distraught parents wrote to confess they had been forced to fabricate the whereabouts of the lion's toy in order to get their children to go to sleep", she said. Rathmann signed 17,000 anniversary prints in 12 days, listening to an audiobook of Flight Behavior by Barbara Kingsolver.

Rathmann called the book's sustained popularity "gratifying beyond words". Rathmann said, "It made my year. Heck, it made my life" when a bookstore owner said that her grandson with cerebral palsy enjoyed the book so much that his first words were 'good night, good night, good night'.

"There's a funny thing that happens between words and pictures," Rathmann said in her interview for Publishers Weekly, explaining that she learned the symbiotic nature of the two in her classes at Otis Parsons. She also learned that neither can exist without the other. In fact, it was yet another class assignment that led to Officer Buckle and Gloria and her Caldecott Medal. "The assignment was to write and illustrate a story which could not be understood by reading the text alone," she related in her Caldecott acceptance speech. "I did it because the teacher told us to, but in the process I discovered that this challenge was the very definition of a picture book. Officer Buckle was the words, Gloria was the pictures, and neither could entertain or enlighten without the other."

== Awards and honors ==
In 2014, Good Night, Gorilla was a runner-up for the Phoenix Picture Book Award from the Children's Literature Association, which annually recognizes the best picture book that did not win a major award 20 years earlier. It has been named a Notable Children's Book by the American Library Association.
