= Laurie Keller =

American children's writer and illustrator

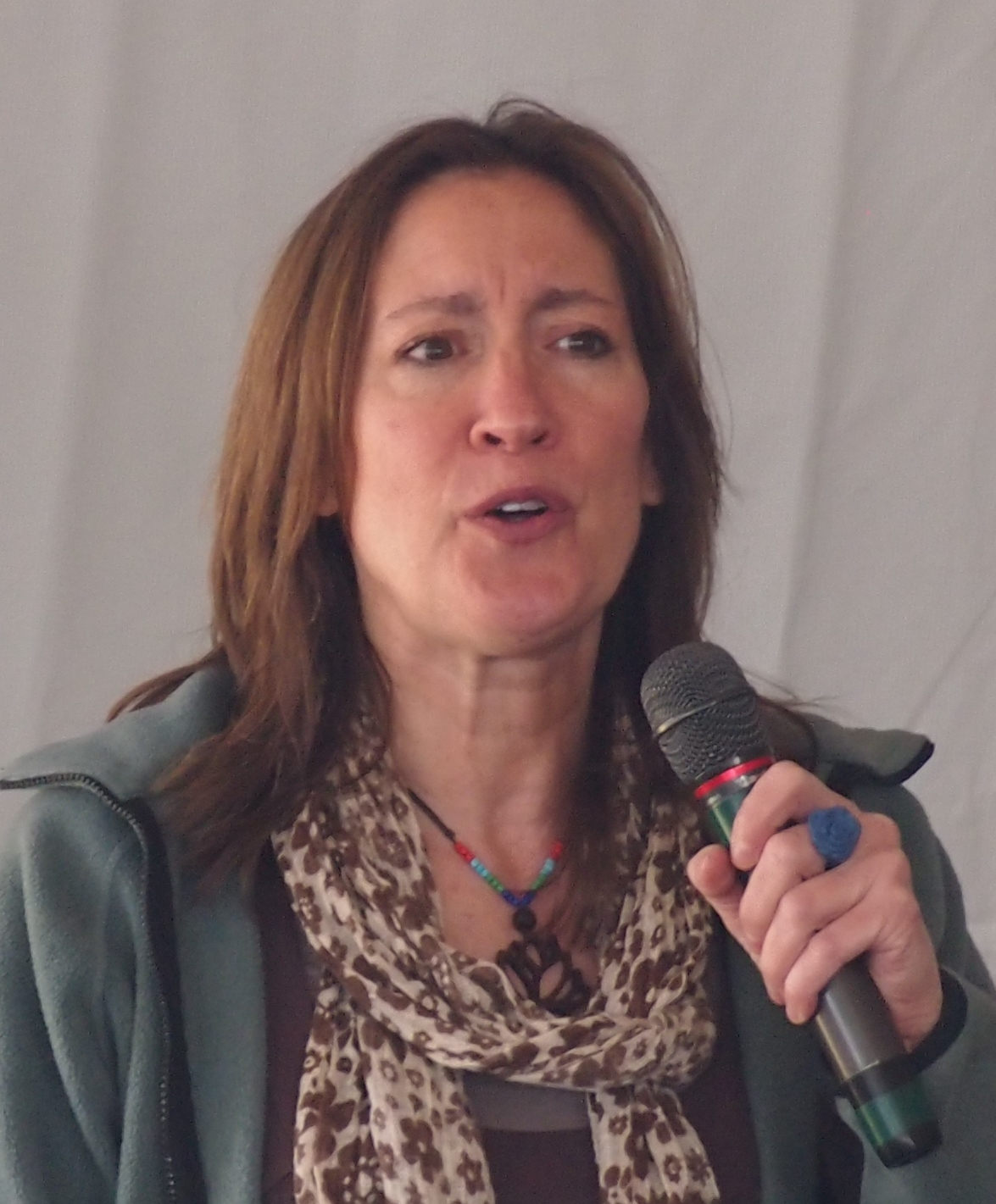
- Keller reading at the Gaithersburg Book Festival, 2014
- Born: Muskegon, Michigan, USA
- Education: Kendall College of Art and Design
- Occupations: Illustrator, writer
- Writing career
- Genres: Children's non-fiction, picture books
- Website: lauriekellerbooks.com

Laurie Keller is an American children's writer and illustrator. She has written and illustrated books for Henry Holt & Co. Books for Young Readers, and produced illustrations for others.

== Life ==
Keller grew up in Muskegon, Michigan. After graduating high school, she took education classes at a local community college and studied dance until a friend brought her to see a show at the Kendall College of Art and Design, which re-sparked her interest, causing her to enroll and receive a degree from the college in illustration.

Following graduation, Keller worked for seven years for Hallmark Cards as a greeting card artist. While there, she was allowed to design entire cards, which caused her to consider writing and illustrating books. Starting in 1997, she made illustrations for Nickelodeon, and later in 1998, she directed 6 network ID's for the channel with Pitch Productions, using pipe-cleaners and cel animation.

Keller has written and illustrated six books for Henry Holt Books for Young Readers: The Scrambled States of America, an American geography book; Open Wide: Tooth School Inside, a dental book about tooth care; Arnie the Doughnut, about an anthropomorphic doughnut; Grandpa Gazillion's Number Yard, a number book, Do Unto Otters, a book about manners; and The Scrambled States of America Talent Show, the follow-up to her 1998 debut.

== Books ==
=== As writer and illustrator ===
==== The Scrambled States of America ====
The Scrambled States of America
- Author: Laurie Keller
- Subject: Geography
- Genre: Fiction; Comedy
- Publication date: 1998
- Publication place: United States
- Media type: Hardback
- Pages: 32
- ISBN: 0-8050-5802-8
- OCLC: 38150163
- Dewey Decimal: [E] 21
- LC Class: PZ7.K281346 Sc 1998

Keller's first book, The Scrambled States of America, was released by Henry Holt Books for Young Readers in 1998. Uncle Sam tells the story about Kansas, one of the 50 states of America becoming bored of where he is and organizing a party with Nebraska, Iowa, Missouri and Illinois, where the states meet each other and decide to trade places. The states enjoy their new locations (Nevada and Mississippi fall in love as a result.) But soon they become uncomfortable and want to move back to where they were before.

Publishers Weekly gave the book a positive review, noting that "it's hard to imagine a more engaging (or comical) way to learn the 50 states and their locations."

- A tie-in card game of the same name was published in 2002 by Gamewright. It is a 2 to 4-player game geared toward players 8 years old and up.
- In 2008, Keller followed up with a companion book, The Scrambled States of America Talent Show. New York comes up with the idea of having all the states participate in a talent show. The states eagerly agree and prepare for their acts. However, Georgia has stage fright and is worried how her performance will go. Kirkus Reviews believed "this exuberant geographical jamboree will definitely leave readers in a state." The book was a Junior Library Guild selection.
- Weston Woods distributes a fully animated version of this book on DVD under the same name.

==== Open Wide: Tooth School Inside ====
Open Wide: Tooth School Inside
- Author: Laurie Keller
- Subject: Biology
- Genre: Fiction
- Publisher: Henry Holt Books for Young Readers
- Publication date: 2000
- Publication place: United States
- Media type: Hardback
- Pages: 40
- ISBN: 0-8050-6192-4
- OCLC: 41256282
- Dewey Decimal: 617.6 21
- LC Class: RK63 .K44 2000

Open Wide: Tooth School Inside was Keller's second book and was released by Henry Holt Books for Young Readers in 2000. It tells the story of a day in a tooth school, with all 32 tooth students present. The book reviews the biology of teeth, tooth care, and teeth in history.

==== Arnie the Doughnut ====
Arnie the Doughnut
- Author: Laurie Keller
- Cover artist: keller
- Subject: Donut
- Genre: Fiction
- Publisher: Henry Holt Books for Young Readers
- Publication date: 2003
- Publication place: United States
- Media type: Hardback
- Pages: 40
- ISBN: 0-8050-6283-1
- OCLC: 49525694
- Dewey Decimal: [E] 21
- LC Class: PZ7.K281346 Ar 2003

Arnie the Doughnut was Keller's third book. Released in April 2003 by Henry Holt Books for Young Readers, it is the story of an anthropomorphic chocolate frosted sprinkle doughnut named Arnie, who changes his fate after being purchased by Mr. Bing.

The story was also released on DVD in 2005, narrated by Michael McKean.

Other Arnie the Doughnut books include:

- Bowling Alley Bandit (2013). This book has received numerous positive reviews including – "yummy chapter-book series opener." "Keller shrewdly targets hesitant readers with an abundance of goofy comedy" " I would recommend this book to kids or adults that prefer silly books. It's very funny and made me laugh every page." "This book, with comic type illustrations, will entertain children who enjoy humor, puns, and silliness."
- Invasion of the Ufonuts (2014)
- The Spinny Icky Showdown (2015)
- Hello, Arnie! (2020)

==== Grandpa Gazillion's Number Yard ====
Grandpa Gazillion's Number Yard
- Author: Laurie Keller
- Subject: Mathematics, Numbers
- Genre: Fiction
- Publisher: Henry Holt Books for Young Readers
- Publication date: 2005
- Publication place: United States
- Media type: Hardback
- Pages: 32
- ISBN: 0-8050-6282-3
- OCLC: 56755961
- Dewey Decimal: [E] 22
- LC Class: PZ8.3.K294 Gr 2005

Grandpa Gazillion's Number Yard is the fourth children's book by Keller. Released in 2005 by Henry Holt Books for Young Readers, it tells, in rhyme, about the numbers 1 through 20 using the character of Grandpa Gazillion, who runs a junkyard full of numbers.

==== Do Unto Otters: A Book About Manners ====
Do Unto Otters
- Author: Laurie Keller
- Subject: Manners
- Publisher: Henry Holt Books for Young Readers
- Publication date: 2007
- Publication place: United States
- Media type: Hardback
- Pages: 40
- ISBN: 0-8050-7996-3
- OCLC: 76133475
- Dewey Decimal: [E] 22
- LC Class: PZ7.K281346 Do 2007

Do Unto Otters: A Book about Manners was released in 2007 by Henry Holt Books for Young Readers. Keller brings the "Golden Rule" to life in the form of Mr. Rabbit and his new neighbors, the Otters, who show kids that a simple "please" or "thank you" goes a long way in making friends, while animating every page with their well-behaved hijinks.

This book was a Junior Library Guild selection.

Weston Woods distributes a fully animated version of this book on DVD under the same name.

Kirkus Reviews stated "While kids may well have encountered the Golden Rule elsewhere, this explanation and elaboration nicely unifies what might otherwise seem like a dreary list of manners. This lively book is anything but."

==== Birdy's Smile Book (2010) ====
Kirkus Reviews found that "The collaged illustrations are bold and textured and occupy white space in Keller's characteristically exuberant style." but "The narrative voice and illustrative feel ... are at odds with much of the content, which requires the sense of humor and irony of an older child. Whether they will embrace the presentation and Birdy's exhaustive salute remains open to question."

==== We Are Growing! (2016) ====
Blades of grass grow in different shapes and sizes... until a lawnmower cuts them all down to the same size.

==== Potato Pants! (2018) ====
Potato Pants! was Keller's seventh book and was released by Henry Holt Books for Young Readers in 2018. It tells the story of Potato and his eggplant nemesis, who struggle to find the perfect pants. The Weston Woods adaptation, released in 2019 and narrated by a full cast, was directed by Galen Fott.

==== Wake Me Up In 20 Coconuts (2022) ====
Wake Me Up In 20 Coconuts follows the story of an abstract know-it-all character named "2C" who has difficulty understanding what "coconuts" means in the context of time when his neighbor asks him to wake her up in "20 coconuts".

=== As illustrator only ===
- Marty Frye, Private Eye (Janet Tashjian) – Scholastic Press – 2000
- Toys!: Amazing Stories Behind Some Great Inventions (Don Wullfson) – 2000
- Stinky Thinking: The Big Book of Gross Games and Brain Teasers (Alan Katz) – Simon & Schuster, Inc. – 2005
- Fooled You!: Fakes and Hoaxes Through the Years (Elaine Pascoe) – Henry Holt and Co. – 2005
- Me and My Animal Friends (Ralph Covert) - 2009
- Pluto Gets The Call (Adam Rex) – 2019
- I Am The Shark (Joan Holub) – 2021
- Bears Are Best (Joan Holub) - 2023
- I Used To Be A Dinosaur (Casey Lyall) - 2026
