= The Pigeon HAS to Go to School! =

Children's book by Mo Willems

- Author: Mo Willems
- Cover artist: Willems
- Language: English
- Genre: Children's book
- Published: July 2, 2019
- Publisher: Hyperion Books for Children
- Publication place: United States
- Pages: 40
- ISBN: 9781368046459
- Preceded by: The Pigeon Needs a Bath!
- Followed by: The Pigeon Will Ride the Roller Coaster!

The Pigeon HAS to Go to School! is a children's book written and illustrated by Mo Willems. Published by Hyperion Books for Children in 2019, it is about a pigeon who must go to school, but frets about math, learning the alphabet, heavy backpacks, and what the teacher and other birds would think of him.

== Reception ==
Kirkus Book Reviews wrote: "All the typical worries and excuses kids have about school are filtered through Willems’ hysterical, bus-loving Pigeon." and "Yes, the Pigeon has to go to school, and so do readers, and this book will surely ease the way."

== Film adaptation ==
An animated short film based on the book was released in 2019 (the same year the book was released) by Weston Woods Studios, with narration by Willems and the additional voices of students from Side by Side School in Norwalk, CT. The film runs for 8 minutes and 20 seconds. It was directed by Pete List.
