= Galen Fott =

American animator and actor

- Born: Galen Sander Fott; September 9, 1963 (age 62); Clarksville, Tennessee, U.S.
- Occupations: Director, animator, writer, actor

Galen Sander Fott (born September 9, 1963) is an American director, animator, writer, and actor. His animated short films have won awards and have screened at film festivals in London, Los Angeles, New York, Toronto, Houston (twelve-time Remi Award Winner), and San Francisco (four-time Golden Gate Award nominee).

Fott was born in Clarksville, Tennessee, the son of Mary Ready (Gilreath) Fott and Solie Isaac Fott. An early fascination with The Muppets on Sesame Street inspired Fott to pursue the performing arts. He attended Clarksville High School and in 1985 graduated from the University of Memphis with a BFA in Theatre Performance.

== Acting ==
After graduation, Fott embarked on a career in theatre, appearing with companies across America. In 1990 Fott joined Actors' Equity Association and toured the US and Canada in the national tour of Mame, starring Juliet Prowse. In 1991, he originated the role of Gaston in Beauty and the Beast: Live On Stage at Walt Disney World. Since moving to Nashville in 2004, he has appeared in leading roles with Nashville Repertory Theatre, Nashville Shakespeare Festival, Nashville Opera, Nashville Children's Theatre, and other local presenters.

Fott has worked as a puppeteer for the Jim Henson Company, performing background characters in several Sesame Street-related video projects. Also for Henson, he made live international appearances as Bear in the Big Blue House and the Coca-Cola Polar Bear. Fott has puppeteered with Wishing Chair Productions, the resident puppet troupe of Nashville Public Library.

In 2014 Fott appeared on an episode of the TV series Nashville as the Group Leader for an AA meeting. He has voiced several characters in the animated films he has directed, including Potato in Potato Pants!, the Rabbit in I Want My Hat Back, and Icky in Du Iz Tak?

== Technical writing ==
Fott has co-authored eight books on digital imaging with Photoshop expert Deke McClelland. These include two editions of the Photoshop Bible, and three volumes in the For Dummies series. Fott has also reviewed graphics software for Macworld and was a contributing editor to PC Magazine.

== Animation ==
In 2002 Fott moved to Vancouver to study animation at VanArts. After completing his training, he moved back to the US and in 2004 founded Bigfott Studios. Since then, Fott has adapted, directed, and animated more than two dozen children's books to video with Weston Woods Studios. The production style varies from 2D computer techniques to hand-drawn animation.

Roberto the Insect Architect (2005, co-directed with Jerry Hunt) is voiced by Sean Hayes. This was the first of Fott's four films to be nominated for the Golden Gate Award in the San Francisco International Film Festival. Roberto also won Best Short Film at the KIDS FIRST! Film and Video Festival, and was the first of eleven of Fott's films to be designated a Notable Children's Video by the Association for Library Service to Children. Other screenings include Anima Mundi, the BFI London Film Festival, Sydney Opera House, the National Gallery of Art, and the Guggenheim Museum.

Max's Words (2007, co-directed with Hunt) is voiced by T.R. Knight. It won the Platinum Award at WorldFest-Houston International Film Festival, and Best Animation Film at Lola Kenya Screen.

Fott has adapted three books by Kate and Jim McMullan: I'm Dirty! (2008), I'm Fast! (2012), and I'm Brave! (2015). These films were voiced by Steve Buscemi, Stanley Tucci, and Jonathan Banks, respectively.

Joanne Woodward provided the narration for All the World (2011). Fott led a team of 12 animators who worked in pencil on paper to capture the quality of Marla Frazee's book illustrations. Poco band members Rusty Young and Jack Sundrud created the film's score.

In 2013 Fott adapted Jon Klassen's I Want My Hat Back. The film screened in the Toronto International Film Festival, the children's film festivals of New York, Boston, and Philadelphia, and won second prize for Best Animated Short Film in the Children's Jury of the Chicago International Children's Film Festival.

Du Iz Tak? (2018), Fott's adaptation of Carson Ellis' Caldecott-honored book, has screened in many international film festivals, including in France, Amsterdam, Italy, Portugal, and Berlin. In 2021 it was awarded the Special Jury Remi Award for Best Animated Short at Worldfest-Houston International Film Festival.

Astaire Unwound, Fott's deconstruction of Fred Astaire's ceiling dance from the movie Royal Wedding, was featured as part of the Comédies Musicales exhibition at the Philharmonie de Paris.

Fott has also created animated scenic projections for live theatre productions. For Dollywood he worked on several Imagination Playhouse productions, including Pretend and Coat of Many Colors. For the Country Music Hall of Fame and Museum, he created animation for String City. For Nashville Children's Theatre, he worked on The Very Hungry Caterpillar Show.

== Personal life ==
Fott lives in Nashville with his wife Laura and son Burton.
