= The Pigeon Will Ride the Roller Coaster! =

2022 children's book by Mo Willems

- Author: Mo Willems
- Cover artist: Willems
- Language: English
- Genre: Children's Book
- Published: September 6, 2022
- Publisher: Union Square Kids
- Publication place: United States
- Pages: 40
- ISBN: 978-1-4549-4686-1
- Preceded by: The Pigeon HAS to Go to School!
- Followed by: Don't Let the Pigeon Drive the Sleigh!

The Pigeon Will Ride the Roller Coaster! is a 2022 children's book written and illustrated by Mo Willems. It is about a pigeon who experiences a loop-de-loop of emotions before his first roller coaster ride.

== Reception ==
The Pigeon Will Ride the Roller Coaster! is a New York Times and IndieBound bestseller.

The book received a starred review from Booklist, who highlighted the book's illustrations: "Willems’ spare illustrations put the spotlight right where it belongs, on Pigeon’s incredibly expressive body language, flapping and flopping through the comic panels." Kirkus Reviews wrote, "Roller-coaster enthusiasts or not, children will eagerly join our intrepid hero on this entertaining ride." Further, they noted, "Willems’ trademark droll illustrations will have readers giggling."

The book was nominated for the 2023 Eisner Award for Best Publication for Early Readers.

== Adaptation ==
In 2023, Weston Woods Studios released an animated short based on The Pigeon Will Ride the Roller Coaster! narrated by Willems and directed by Pete List.
