= Barbara Bottner =

American author and artist

Barbara Bottner is an American author and artist who has published over fifty children’s books in all genres, and an award-winning teacher of writing for children. She has written primetime comedy, feature scripts, short stories for national magazines, animated shorts, essays, book reviews and scholarly articles. She contributes short theatrical pieces for the Braid Theater and occasionally spoken word around Los Angeles.

== Biography ==
Bottner began as a painter. Designing off-Broadway sets led her to performance. As an actor, she worked with Sam Shepard in the downtown troupe Theater Genesis. She was a member of Ellen Stewart's troupe La Mama Plexus, with whom she toured Europe, appeared in London's West End, and played in New York City and colleges around the US. Bottner was the subject of the short film Time and No Time by Rita Stafford.

Bottner eventually began writing and illustrating books for children and creating children's films. She has created award-winning short films for Sesame Street and the Electric Company, and written lyrics for Jim Henson's Fair is Fair album for the Muppets.

== Children's literature ==
Bottner has written over 50 books in all areas of children's literature, including YA, Middle Grade, chapter and I Can Read, as well as her award-winning picture books, some of which have been animate and performed as children's theater. One of her recent titles, Miss Brooks Loves Books, was a New York Times best-seller. She has received numerous awards, appeared on many "Best Of" lists, and received children's choice awards.

Feeling drawn to children and young adult audiences, Bottner wrote After School Specials with Arlene Sidaris and was a staff writer on the primetime CBS sitcom Scorch. She worked as a writer for Disney's Winnie the Pooh series, and Showtime's Mrs. Piggle-Wiggle series. Bottner and Sidaris wrote Mama Said.

Bottner has contributed features to the Miami Herald's Tropic Magazine, and written about men and women in its "Can't Live Without 'Em" column. She was a contributing editor for LA Weekly, where she wrote humor, features, and interviews with Jerzy Kosinski and Joseph Losey. Her art has been used in the Op Ed section of the New York Times and in MS. Magazine. She has reviewed books for children both in the New York and Los Angeles New York Times Sunday Book Review. Her short stories have been published in Cosmopolitan and Playgirl, and anthologized in two collections.

As a teacher, she won the Distinguished Teaching Award from the New School for Social Research, Parsons School of Design. She has taught at UCLA and Miami Dade College, lectured around the US on children's literature, and presented at the Bologna Children's Book Fair for SCBWI. Her papers are collected in the Arne Nixon Centre for Children's Literature at Fresno State.

She has staffed various conferences, and judged national contests on children's literature. She still led classes in writing for children as late as 1990.

== Partial bibliography ==
- Horrible Hannah, illustrated by Joan Drescher, Crown, 1980
- Zoo Song, illustrated by Lynn Munsinger, Scholastic, 1987
- Bootsie Barker Bites, illustrated by Peggy Rathmann, Putnam Children's Books, 1992
- Hurricane Music, illustrated by Paul Yalowitz, Putnam, 1995
- Nana Hannah's Piano, illustrated by Diana Cain Bluthenal, Putnam, 1996
- Be Brown!, illustrated by Barry Gott, Grosset & Dunlap, 2002
- Wallace's Lists, illustrated by Olof Landstrom, co-written with Gerald Kruglik, Katherine Tegen Books, 2004
- Miss Brooks Loves Books (and I don't), illustrated by Michael Emberley, Knopf Books, 2010
- An Annoying ABC, illustrated by Michael Emberley, Knopf Books, 2011
- Miss Brooks' Story Nook, illustrated by Michael Emberley, Knopf Books, 2014
- Priscilla Gorilla, illustrated by Michael Emberley, Atheneum/Caitlyn Dlouhy Books, 2017
- Amy Is Famous, illustrated by Yuyi Chen, Imprint, 2019
- What A Cold Needs, illustrated by Chris Sheban, Holiday House, 2020
- Where's My Turtle, illustrated by Brooke Boynton-Hughes, Random House, 2020
- I Am Here Now, Macmillan, 2020
