= James Daugherty =

American painter

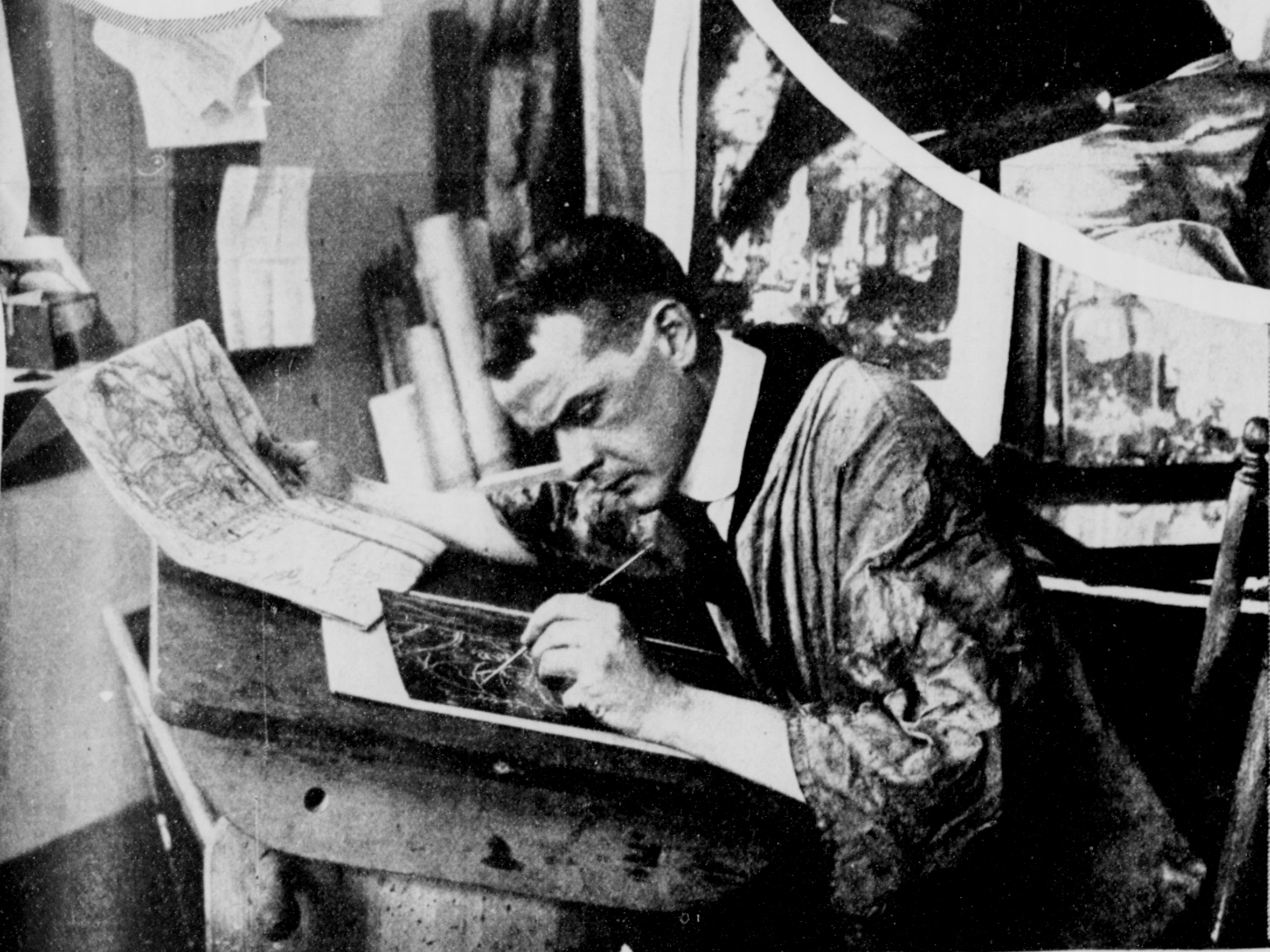
James Daugherty, c. 1917

James Henry Daugherty (June 1, 1889 – February 21, 1974) was an American modernist painter, muralist, children's book author and illustrator.

== Life ==
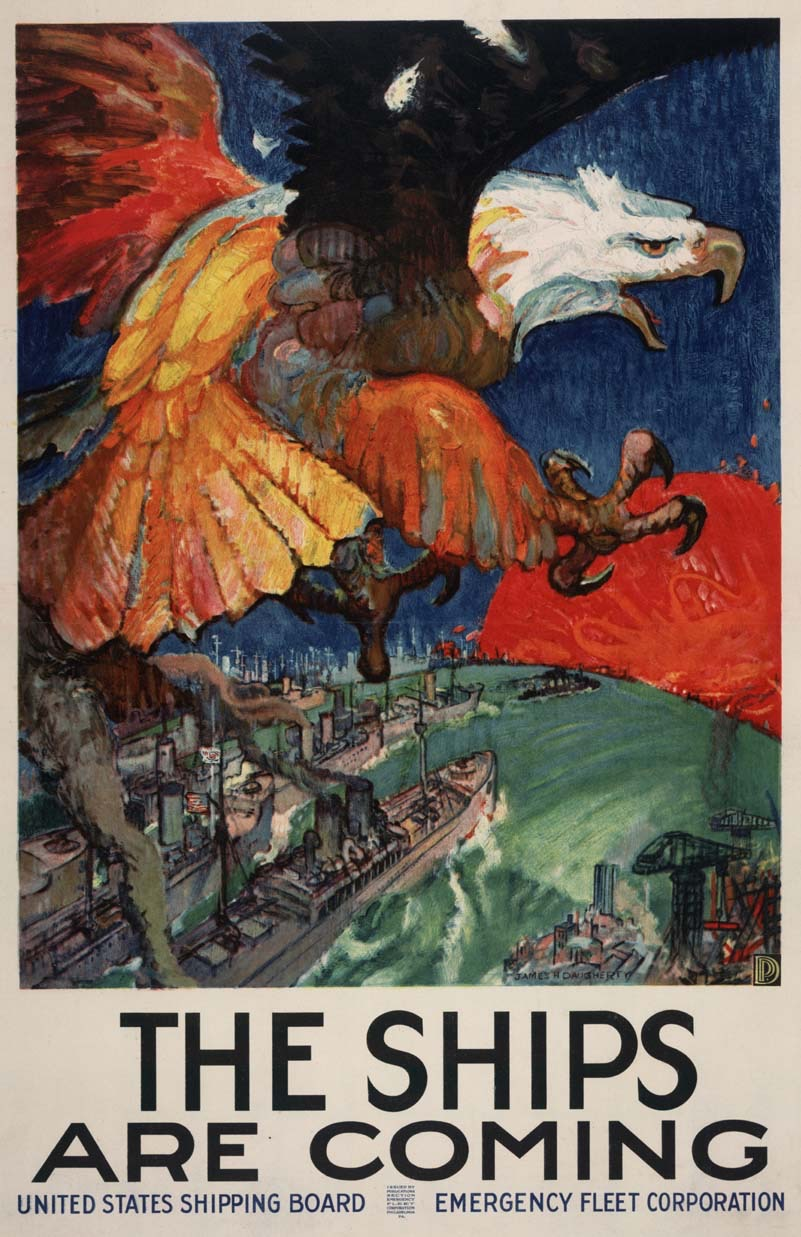
One of Daugherty's World War I posters for the US Shipping Board

Daugherty was born in Asheville, North Carolina. He later lived in Indiana, Ohio, and at the age of 9 he moved to Washington, D.C., where he studied at the Corcoran School of Art. Later, he went to London and studied under Frank Brangwyn. During World War I, he was commissioned to produce propaganda posters for various US Government agencies, including the United States Shipping Board.

Daugherty wrote and illustrated several children's books during his career, and his book Daniel Boone won the Newbery Medal. His book with Benjamin Elkin, Gillespie and the Guards, won the Caldecott Honor in 1957. He was also the author of Walt Whitman's America Selections and Drawings by James Daugherty. He died in Boston, Massachusetts.

Four huge murals by James Daugherty, entitled "The Spirit of Pageantry — Africa", "The Spirit of Drama — Europe", "The Spirit of Cinema — America", and "The Spirit of Fantasy — Asia" are located in the State Theatre which is part of the beautiful Playhouse Square theater district in downtown Cleveland, Ohio.

In September 2006, controversy erupted at Hamilton Avenue School, an elementary school in Greenwich, Connecticut, over Daugherty's depiction of the Bunker Hill hero and Connecticut native Israel Putnam in a mural commissioned by Public Works of Art Project for the town hall, and installed in the school in 1935. The mural was restored, and revealed a scene, filled with violent and richly colored imagery, including snarling animals, tomahawk-wielding American Indians and a half-naked General Putnam strapped to a burning stake. School officials objected to the violent imagery and ordered the mural removed to the Greenwich Public Library.
