= Knuffle Bunny Free =

Book by Mo Willems

Knuffle Bunny Free: An Unexpected Diversion
- Author: Mo Willems
- Cover artist: Mo Willems
- Language: English
- Series: Knuffle Bunny
- Genre: children's books picture books
- Publisher: Balzer & Bray
- Publication date: 28 September 2010
- Publication place: United States
- Pages: 52
- ISBN: 978-0-0619-2957-1
- OCLC: 893193255
- Preceded by: Knuffle Bunny Too
- Followed by: N/A

Knuffle Bunny Free: An Unexpected Diversion is a children's picture book written and illustrated by Mo Willems. It is the third and final book in Willems' Knuffle Bunny series, which also includes Knuffle Bunny: A Cautionary Tale and Knuffle Bunny Too: A Case of Mistaken Identity. The book was released on September 28, 2010, by Balzer + Bray, an imprint of HarperCollins.

== Plot ==
Trixie Willems and her family take a trip to visit her grandparents, Oma & Opa, in Holland. Trixie is excited about flying on an airplane for her first time, but accidentally leaves her beloved stuffed toy rabbit, Knuffle Bunny, on the airplane after landing and does not realize the toy bunny is missing — until it is too late; Knuffle Bunny is on his way to China. Luckily, Trixie's family reassures her that she is getting older, so she must try to have courage. Still upset, Trixie goes to bed. She dreams of all the fantastic places Knuffle Bunny will visit and all of the fun things he will do. This brightens her mood considerably and comforts her. Soon, her vacation is over, and she gets on the airplane to fly back home to New York City. Surprisingly, it is the same plane as before, and Knuffle Bunny is waiting for her in a seat pocket. Trixie is excited until she sees a baby crying behind her and gives Knuffle Bunny to the baby for comfort. In the end, Trixie receives her very first letter from the baby a few weeks later.

=== Epilogue ===
In an epilogue to the book, Mo Willems wishes the real Trixie, his daughter, a happy and fulfilling life, and he predicts that Knuffle Bunny will someday return as a playmate for his daughter's own child.

== Reception ==
Knuffle Bunny Free was received well by critics. In The New York Times, the American columnist Pamela Paul stated that the book "will leave children aspiring to be like its hero or proud that they already are."

Knuffle Bunny Free debuted at the number one spot on The New York Times Best Seller list. Amazon.com named the book one of its "Top 10 Children's Picture Books of 2010". For his work on the book, Willems was a finalist of the 2011 Children's Book Week Illustrator of the Year (sponsored by the Children's Book Council of the United States).

== Animated film ==
Weston Woods Studios released an animated version of the book in 2012, with narration by Mo, Cheryl, and Trixie Willems, and animation by Karen Villarreal.

== See also ==
- Elephant and Piggie – Children's book series by Mo Willems
- Cat the Cat – Children's book series by Mo Willems
