= Curious Pictures =

American animation studio and multi-media company

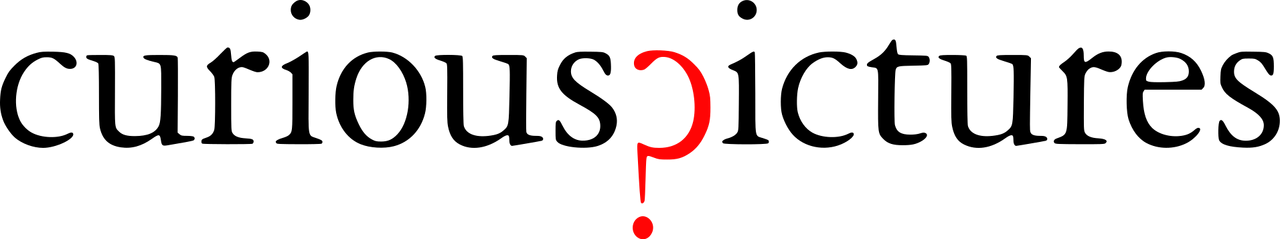
- Formerly: Stowmar Enterprises (1978–1981); Open Studio (1981–1982); Broadcast Arts (1982–1993)
- Type: Private
- Industry: Television; Film; Commercials; Animation; Digital; Video games VFX
- Founded: March 19, 1978; 48 years ago
- Founder: Steve Oakes; Peter Rosentheal
- Defunct: April 24, 2015; 11 years ago
- Fate: Closed
- Headquarters: Crystal City, Virginia, U.S. (1978–1981); Washington, D.C., U.S. (1981–1985); New York City, New York, U.S. (1985–2014); San Francisco, California, U.S. (1996–2000); Los Angeles, California, U.S. (2008–2015)
- Key people: Jan Korbelin (Managing Partner); Marina Grasic (Managing Partner); Camille Geier (SVP/Head of Studio); Vadim Turchin (VFX/CG Supervisor)
- Number of employees: 60
- Parent: Harmony Pictures (1994–1999); Intelefim (1999–2002)

Curious Pictures (stylized as curious?ictures) was an American animation studio and multi-media company that was primarily based in New York City that produced television programs, commercials, animation and video games. The company is known for its flagship work such as the preschool television series A Little Curious for HBO, Little Einsteins for Disney Jr. and Team Umizoomi for Nick Jr. Other well-known works include Sheep in the Big City and Codename: Kids Next Door for Cartoon Network.

== History ==
After working at Stowmar Enterprises, Steve Oakes and Peter Rosentheal co-founded Broadcast Arts in Washington, D.C. in 1981. One of the company's first assignment was a series of network IDs for MTV, which had set the standard for the network's irreverent humour. This success established the fledgling studio and brought them projects for WPLJ, Showtime, Cinemax, ABC, and more. Broadcast Arts moved to New York City in 1985. Broadcast Arts produced hundreds of commercials, constantly weaving together multiple animation and special effects techniques for various projects, as well as the animation for the first season of Pee-wee's Playhouse. Broadcast Arts changed its name to Curious Pictures in 1993.

Having worked together for several years, the team of five partners, Susan Holden, Steve Oakes, David Starr, Peter Rosentheal, and Richard Winkler, continued producing television commercials, with the intention of expanding to television programming, toy production, and other ventures. In 1994, the company expanded into a 25,000 square-foot studio in Lower Manhattan, fully equipping it with a cel and computer animation department, a shooting stage with two motion control camera systems, a prop and model shop, and digital editing rooms. From 1995 to 1999, an office was maintained in San Francisco to support the company's expansion into animated television series. In 1998, A Little Curious for HBO became the company's first half-hour series, followed soon after by another project, Sheep in the Big City, for Cartoon Network. Other animated series included Codename: Kids Next Door, created by Mr. Warburton, for Cartoon Network, Little Einsteins for Playhouse Disney, and Team Umizoomi for Nickelodeon.

== Filmography ==
=== Television series ===
Title	Creator(s)	Network(s)	Year(s)	Notes	Co-production(s)
MaxTrax			1984	bumpers	
The George Michael Sports Machine		NBC; First-run syndication	1984	main titles	
Pee-wee's Playhouse	Paul Reubens	CBS	1986	season 1 only	Pee-wee Pictures
KaBlam!	Bob Mittenthal; Will McRobb; Chris Viscardi	Nickelodeon	1996–1999	The Off-Beats segments	Nickelodeon Animation Studio
Sesame Street	Joan Ganz Cooney; Lloyd Morrisett	PBS	1999	Elmo's World segments; season 1 only	Sesame Workshop
A Little Curious	Steve Oakes	HBO	1999–2000		
The Cartoon Cartoon Show		Cartoon Network	2000	"Prickles the Cactus" and "Sheep in the Big City"	
Sheep in the Big City	Mo Willems	Cartoon Network	2000–2002		

- Saturday TV Funhouse ("The Narrator That Ruined Christmas") (2001)
- Cyberchase (original main character designs; 2002–present)
- Codename: Kids Next Door (2002–2008)
- Hey Joel (2003)
- The Wrong Coast (2004)
- Sunday Pants ("Freshman Clowns") (2005)
- Little Einsteins (2005–2010)
- Bored to Death (main titles; 2009–2011)
- Team Umizoomi (2010–2015)
- Eureka ("Do You See What I See") (2011)
- A Day in the Life (opening animation; 2011)

=== Films and specials ===
- Star Trek: The Motion Picture (graphic display animation; 1979)
- I Go Pogo (1980)
- Who's That Girl (title sequence; 1987)
- Vandemonium Plus (1987)
- Norman's Corner (1988)
- The Jackie Bison Show (1990)
- Smoke Alarm (1996)
- An Off-Beats Valentine's (1999)
- Cyberchase: The Poddleville Case (1999)
- My Scene: Jammin' in Jamaica (2004)
- My Scene: Masquerade Madness (2004)
- My Scene Goes Hollywood: The Movie (2005)
- PollyWorld (2006)
- The Barbie Diaries (2006)
- Codename: Kids Next Door: Operation Z.E.R.O. (2006)
- Chicago 10 (animation; 2007)
- The Grim Adventures of the KND (co-produced with Cartoon Network Studios; 2007)
- Where in the World Is Osama bin Laden? (graphic design; 2008)
- August (additional visual effects; 2008)
- Codename: Kids Next Door: Operation: I.N.T.E.R.V.I.E.W.S. (2008)
- The Love Guru (graphics and visual effects; 2008)
- Black Swan (motion capture; 2010)
- It's Kind of a Funny Story (visual effects; 2010)

=== Video games ===
- Rock Band (motion capture and animation; 2007)
- Rock Band 2 (motion capture and animation; 2008)
- Grey's Anatomy: The Video Game (2009)
- The Beatles: Rock Band (2009)
- Grand Theft Auto: The Ballad of Gay Tony (2009)
- Red Dead Redemption (2010)
- Green Day: Rock Band (2010)
- Dance Central (2010)
- Homefront (2011)
- Dance Central 2 (2011)
- Leela (2011)

=== Short films ===
- "Don't Answer Me" (music video; 1984)
- Bite & Smile (1989)
- The Louie and Louie Show: A Seedy Situation (1993)
- Foil Man (assisting only; 1995)
- Cartoon Network Shorties (1998)
- Life (special thanks; 1999)
