= Let's Go for a Drive! =

2012 children's book

- Author: Mo Willems
- Language: English
- Genre: children's books picture books
- Publisher: Hyperion Books for Children
- Publication date: October 2, 2012
- Publication place: United States
- Pages: 57
- ISBN: 978-1-4231-6482-1

Let's Go for a Drive! is a children's picture book written and illustrated by Mo Willems, published in 2012 by Hyperion Books for Children. It is a book in the Elephant and Piggie series.

== Plot ==
An elephant called Gerald and a pig called Piggie want to go for a drive. Gerald decides they need a number of items for the trip like bags, a map, sunglasses and umbrellas. They sing as they get ready but unfortunately, they don't have a car. Gerald gets upset but then Piggie makes a suggestion, which makes everything better.

== Reception ==
Kirkus Reviews finds that "The dauntless duo’s 18th outing employs Willems’ award-winning formula: color-coded speech bubbles; lots of white space; endearing visual characterization ... effortless phonetic play; thoughtfully designed endpapers; silliness." Common Sense Media believes that it "...gives new readers a fun lesson in being flexible."

== Awards ==
- Geisel Award runner-up 2013
