= Knuffle Bunny Too =

Book by Mo Willems

Knuffle Bunny Too: A Case of Mistaken Identity
- Front cover, designed by Mo Willems
- Author: Mo Willems
- Illustrator: Mo Willems
- Cover artist: Willems
- Language: English
- Series: Knuffle Bunny Series
- Genre: children's books picture books
- Publisher: Hyperion Books
- Publication date: September 4, 2007
- Publication place: United States
- Media type: Hardcover
- Pages: 48
- ISBN: 978-1-4231-0299-1
- Preceded by: Knuffle Bunny
- Followed by: Knuffle Bunny Free

Knuffle Bunny Too: A Case of Mistaken Identity is a children's picture book written and illustrated by Mo Willems. A sequel to Knuffle Bunny, it was released on September 4, 2007, by Hyperion Books and reached the number one spot on the New York Times Bestseller List for children's books. In 2009 Weston Woods Studios released an animated version of the book. It was directed by Karen Villarreal and is narrated by Mo, Cheryl, and Trixie Willems.

== Plot ==
In the book, young Trixie Willems realizes that her enemy classmate, Sonja, has the same type of "Knuffle Bunny" stuffed toy rabbit that she does. When the jealous girls begin arguing, their teacher, Mrs. Greengrove, confiscates the stuffed bunnies, then returns them at the end of the school day. By 2:30 A.M, a shocked Trixie realizes that Mrs. Greengrove has given her Sonja's Knuffle Bunny instead of hers, and desperately asks Mo to call Sonja's house to exchange them back. In the end, the duo make up for each other and become friends.

== Reception ==
Newsday's Sonja Bolle praised the book for its "inventive illustration style" and said, "Anyone who fell in love with the first 'Knuffle Bunny' two years ago will pounce on this sequel, even if they've grown up since then." Leonard S. Marcus of the New York Times Book Review added, "Willems has a brilliant knack for exposing early childhood's developmental pivot points, and for lampooning the best efforts of today's hip but hapless parents to do the right thing." Kirkus Reviews wrote "Too often, sequels come off as obviously calculated attempts to cash in on success; this offering, with its technical brilliance and its total and sympathetic understanding of the psychology of the preschooler, stands as magnificent in its own right." and "The middle-of-the-night hostage exchange features a glorious image of the Manhattan skyline, the teeny figures of Trixie and her daddy and Sonja and her daddy approaching from opposite sides of Grand Army Plaza."

== Awards ==
The book received a Caldecott Honor in 2008 and was the 2008 ALA notable Children's (Young Readers) Book. A sequel, and the conclusion of the trilogy, is Knuffle Bunny Free.
