= Naked Mole Rat Gets Dressed =

2009 picture book by Mo Willems

Naked Mole Rat Gets Dressed is a 2009 children's picture book by Mo Willems, published by Hyperion.

It is about Wilbur, a naked mole rat who wants to wear clothes and who gains the ire of other naked mole rats who do not like what he is doing. Ultimately Grand-pah, the head of the mole rats, asks them to respect Wilbur's choice.

Kirkus Reviews stated that the work states that people should have different options in situations as opposed to advocating to all persons or groups "to stand out from the crowd".

Publishers Weekly gave the book a starred review, described the book as "Straightforward and engaging" and stated that the "droll" writing works well with the illustrations.

== Adaptations ==
There was an animated cartoon version that was released on DVD. It has music in a jazz style.

There is also a stage musical adaptation, which the John F. Kennedy Center for the Performing Arts was not involved in developing despite having premiered other Mo Willems musicals. Deborah Wicks La Puma, the composer of the show, stated that the word "naked" in the title was initially an issue, but Seattle Children's Theatre eventually commissioned and premiered the musical instead.

The stage musical was later adapted into a short animated film starring Jordan Fisher that aired on HBO Max.
