= Sheep in the Big City =

American animated television series

- Genre: Comedy
- Created by: Mo Willems
- Written by: Mo Willems; David Wain; Joey Mazzarino
- Directed by: Karen Villarreal; Maurice Joyce; Sue Perrotto; Tom Warburton
- Voices of: Kevin Seal; James Godwin; Ken Schatz; Stephanie D'Abruzzo; Mo Willems; Christine Walters; Ruth Buzzi; Bradley Glenn; Fran Brill; Joey Mazzarino; Jerry Nelson
- Narrated by: Ken Schatz
- Theme music composer: Julian Harris
- Composer: Julian Harris
- Country of origin: United States
- Original language: English
- No. of seasons: 2
- No. of episodes: 26

Production
- Executive producers: Mo Willems; Steve Oakes; Susan Holden; David Starr; Richard Winkler (for Curious Pictures); Linda Simensky; Jay Bastian; Khaki Jones (for Cartoon Network)
- Producers: Kris Greengrove (season 1); Bruce Knapp (season 2)
- Editor: Dave Courter
- Running time: 22 minutes
- Production company: Curious Pictures

Original release
- Network: Cartoon Network
- Release: November 17, 2000 – April 7, 2002

Sheep in the Big City is an American animated television series created by Mo Willems for Cartoon Network. The 9th of the network's Cartoon Cartoons, the series' pilot first premiered as part of Cartoon Network's "Cartoon Cartoon Summer" on August 18, 2000, before its official debut on November 17, 2000. It aired until April 7, 2002, with repeats airing until 2003.

Willems previously created The Off-Beats for Nickelodeon's KaBlam! before working on this animated show. The series follows a runaway sheep named Sheep in his new life in "the Big City", where he tries to avoid a secret military organization. It also features several unrelated sketches and shorts, similar to those from The Adventures of Rocky and Bullwinkle and Friends. With an emphasis on sophisticated (in particular, literal) humor, using different forms of rhetoric from characters to plots, it included comic references to filmmaking and television broadcasting.

At the time, the premiere of Sheep in the Big City was the highest-rated premiere for a Cartoon Network original series. The animation services for the series were handled by the South Korean animation studio Rough Draft Korea.

== Premise ==
Sheep lives happily on a farm with his friends and owner, the mild-mannered and childlike Farmer John. Unfortunately, a Secret Military Organization, led by General Specific, needs Sheep for its Sheep-Powered Ray Gun (with a sheep-shaped hole in it).

General Specific will get Sheep at any cost, and, knowing that the farm is at stake, Sheep is forced to leave for the big city. Now Sheep is on the run from General Specific, who is assisted by his henchmen, Private Public, the Angry Scientist (who in the show is often wrongly referred to as 'Mad Scientist'), a bunch of other military types, and the Plot Device.

In addition, Sheep has to come to grips with the Big City and trying to romance his love, Swanky the Poodle. All the while, he has to avoid the attentions of a host of unwelcome characters—Lisa Rental and Swanky's owner, the sheep-hating Lady Richington, wielding a stainless-steel wig.

== Characters ==
- Sheep (vocal effects by Kevin Seal) is an anthropomorphic sheep, who is the main protagonist of the series. He is owned by Farmer John, who named him Sheep due to the fact that he "looked just like a little sheep" when he was born. Sheep has a hard time with life between getting chased by the military and trying to see Swanky the Poodle, the poodle that Sheep loves, without getting bonked on the head by Lady Richington with her stainless steel wig. Yet he still makes time to act in dishwashing commercials, travel through time, get a job at a hip club, and make a living jumping over fences for insomniacs. Sheep bleats but does not speak in any intelligible human language. As he is a normal sheep, aside from possibly higher intelligence, he has trouble resisting his animal urges, such as eating grass, even when he is being chased by General Specific.
- General Specific (voiced by Kevin Seal) is the main antagonist of the series. The ruthless and ambitious leader of the Secret Military Organization, Specific does his best to capture Sheep for his Sheep-Powered Ray Gun. He is never discouraged by his constant losses. Specific always speaks through his clenched teeth. He mentions in one episode that he has a steel plate in his head. In one episode, he also developed the habit of throwing his subordinates into "The Pit", but later, finds out that this is a problem, when neither he nor Private Public can maneuver the helicopter properly, because Specific dropped the helicopter pilot into the Pit. General Specific's name is an oxymoron. On his uniform, he has three medals that look like exclamation marks, and one that looks like a question mark.
- Farmer John (voiced by James Godwin) is Sheep's original owner, also seeking to recapture him—although in a more mild-mannered way than General Specific. In one episode, it is revealed that "Far" and "Mer" are actually Farmer John's first and middle name, not his job description. According to Dirk and Sondra's reenacting of Farmer John's parents naming him, he was named "Far" after his father's desire to know how "far" he goes in life and "Mer" after a relative of Farmer John's father. Sondra also jokingly suggested (albeit it's unclear if she said it on her own or if she was still acting as Farmer John's mother) that Farmer John could be named 'Elton'. Both Dirk and Sondra laughed at the suggestion. Farmer John's personality is best described that, in order not to kill any of his farm animals, he prepares water soup for the re-union. He is constantly using pseudo-psychological talk, which is, in fact, extremely boring and instead of "helping", it forces the characters not to pay attention to him. Another example of his annoyance is his "thanks" speech at the reunion, where he thanks for everything, including "air" and "silly shoes". He sometimes calls Sheep "Sheepie".
- Ben Plotz (voiced by Ken Schatz) is the show's narrator. He often complains about the quality of the writing on the show, but overall, he has an appreciation for the cast. He, on one occasion, embellishes the storyline when he dislikes the ending. Other times, he is forced to make changes to the show by Irv to preserve the show's budget.
- Private Public (voiced by James Godwin) is General Specific's right-hand man. He is always right behind General Specific, and despite being much smarter, he would prefer to receive orders than give them. His name is also an oxymoron.
- The Angry Scientist (voiced by Mo Willems) often gets his hump busted for being an Angry Scientist rather than Mad, but he is the brains behind the organization, despite his extremely limited grasp of the English language (referring to it with the phrase "Why are you not my Englishness be understanding? All the timing with that"). His inventions include the Sheep-Powered Ray Gun, the Clome, and a Time-Travel Bicycle (although Private Public flatly points out that if he can invent a time machine why cannot he invent a ray gun that works without a sheep). He often goes into fits of rage at General Specific when he calls him a 'Mad Scientist', and on one occasion, he is called the 'Angry Chemist'. At the end of Season 1, he considers calling himself "The Scientist with Some Issues", now getting angry whenever he gets referred as "The Angry Scientist". He's mistakenly called 'Mad Scientist' so often that, in one occasion, he complained about it out of habit when he was called 'Angry Scientist'. He once opened an anger management center where he taught people to become angrier. General Specific used to be one of his clients until he said the center made him madder, making the Angry Scientist expel him, claiming it was an 'Anger Management Center' and not a 'Madness Management Center'. General Specific was so angry for being expelled The Angry Scientist considered him another satisfied customer.
- The Plot Device (voiced by Stephanie D'Abruzzo) is a machine that comes up with plans for General Specific, such as disguising sleep potion as water soup to sneak into Farmer John's house. Her name is a pun as her main role in the stories is as a plot device.
- General Lee Outrageous (voiced by Joey Mazzarino) is General Specific's cousin, who is a stereotypical 1970s disco partier. He is nearly identical to Specific, but has sunglasses, shiny clothing, blue hair shaped into a ponytail, a gold tooth and three stars on his hat, as opposed to Specific's one star. Lee is also Specific's rival, and uses a goat-powered ray-gun. He has a sidekick called Private Party, who is similar to Private Public. His name is a pun on "generally outrageous".
- Lady Virginia Richington (voiced by Ruth Buzzi in the pilot and Stephanie D'Abruzzo in the series) is the owner of Swanky. Lady Richington, of the Filthy Richingtons, is quite rich. She owns the majority of the city and is never seen without her gaudy jewellery and lavish clothing. While she may not look very intimidating, she has a severe hatred of sheep in general, and will not hesitate to pummel them into fluffy pulps with her stainless steel wig.
- Lisa Rental (voiced by Stephanie D'Abruzzo) is an annoying, evil little girl, who thinks that Sheep is a "cutesy wootsey dog" and wants him desperately. Lisa also loves to refer to Sheep as "Doggy Woggy Smoggy Foggy Loggy Toggy Doggy". Her name is a pun on the words "lease a rental". When she and General Specific first met, she convinced him that Sheep was a dog by having Sheep obey her commands and telling him Sheep was a sheep dog.
- X Agent is a black-woollen sheep whom General Specific hired in order to capture Sheep. X Agent becomes best friends with Sheep and, after feeling remorse for betraying Sheep, betrays Specific and becomes a Batman-like superhero. In another episode, he becomes an overprotective guardian of Sheep. He leaves after Completely Powerful Guy reads a telegram from "The Writer", informing X Agent that he has been assigned to Toledo, Ohio, and that the request is not "just a convenient way of getting you out of this show". Like Sheep, X Agent bleats and does not speak in intelligible human language.
- Oxymoron is an ox who debuted in numerous "Phony Bologna" advertisements for the Oxymoron company. He also makes cameos in some episodes. His name is a pun on the word "oxymoron".
- Victor (voiced by Ken Schatz) is an obnoxious salesman and spokesperson who usually hosts the Oxymoron commercials. The other people in the commercials do not usually expect him to show up and often demand to know who he is when he does, but he never tells them. Victor does not (or wishes not to) see the harmfulness and uselessness of his products.
- Jay (voiced by Ken Schatz) is a man who, whenever Sheep or any other main character sees a sign, is first heard reading it aloud, and when the character turns to him, he raises his glasses and says something along the lines of "I like to read" or "Reading is funducational".
- Swanky the Poodle (voiced by Stephanie D'Abruzzo) is a poodle and Sheep's love interest who returns Sheep's feelings. Swanky is owned by Lady Richington.
- Great Scott (voiced by Ken Schatz) is a Scotsman, appearing and saying "EEE-Yeeeeeeeeesssss?" (as a parody of Frank Nelson) after someone says the exclamation "Great Scott!" He was once accompanied by Holly Molly.
- News Announcers: The duo of news announcers, one a neurotic, angry man called Hank (voiced by Ken Schatz) and the other a ditsy blond female called Betsy (voiced by Stephanie D'Abruzzo), who proclaim everything oh-so unrelated as a "related story".
- Irv, the Studio Accountant (voiced by Joey Mazzarino) forces, in order to lower show expenses, the narrator to make the sounds himself and re-directs Sheep into escaping in the time machine because "so much time and money was put" into its building and re-construction.
- The Sombrero Brothers are two untalented performers in Mexican attire whose act, "Flying Sombrero Brothers", is flying on a plane. Their names are Hector (voiced by Mo Willems) and Bill (voiced by Ken Schatz).
- The Ranting Swede (voiced by Kevin Seal) is a Swedish man who rants about pianos, supermarkets, and a variety of other topics. His rants appear at the end of every single episode, except episode 18, where he was replaced by The Ranting Norwegian, due to a schedule conflict and the final episode, which is done in reverse order.
- The Ranting Norwegian (voiced by Kevin Seal) is a Norwegian man who does not know much about ranting but instead talks about a car he recently got, and appreciates things rather than ranting about them. Unlike the Ranting Swede, he speaks much more softly and nicely, and also explains how the people in Norway do not have too much to rant about.
- General Public (voiced by Jerry Nelson) is Private Public's father.

== Production ==
Sheep in the Big City was created by Mo Willems, who began his career doing stage comedy in the 1980s and aspired to be an artist. Willems recalled in a 2001 interview, "My desire as a kid was to find a way to be funny and draw. Animation turned out to be the best way for me to do that." After graduating from New York University Tisch School of the Arts, Willems began making short films for Sesame Street and writing for The Muppets. He would also work on Nickelodeon's short-form animated series The Off-Beats, which had a similar art style to Sheep in the Big City. Willems has stated that the work of Pablo Picasso has influenced his art style.

Sheep in the Big City was broadcast alongside ten potential pilot shorts during Cartoon Network's "Cartoon Cartoon Summer" marathon on August 18, 2000. The series, along with The Grim Adventures of Billy & Mandy and Whatever Happened to... Robot Jones?, was greenlit by the network and would premiere on November 17, 2000. The series was broadcast for two seasons.

== Style ==
The show usually begins with a completely unrelated clip, which turns out to be a show that Sheep is watching. Sheep presses a button on his remote to change the channel, which segues into the theme song.

Each episode is divided into three chapters, and each episode and chapter title is a pun on the word 'sheep' or a related word. In the episode "To Sheep, Perchance to Dream!", one chapter is named "Some Pun on the Word 'Sheep'".

Fake advertisements are in between the chapters, and sometimes short skits, such as the Sombrero Brothers. The fake advertisements are usually of products from Oxymoron with Victor the spokesperson promoting it. Each product is usually of low quality (contrary to what one may think) or causes pain in some way.

The show's most unusual characteristic is its frequent breaking of the fourth wall. For instance, the vast majority of the characters make references to the show's structure, script, and, occasionally, its premise. For example, in episode 8, when General Specific finally captures Sheep, the Angry Scientist states that he didn't actually have the Ray Gun ready, thinking that they would never capture Sheep due to it "being so contrary to the set-up of the show". The Narrator is also a pivotal character, frequently interacting with the characters via voice-over (and sometimes directly, when other characters unexpectedly show up in his studio). He also criticizes the television medium itself (such as the fact that two-thirds of the final episode of the first season was actually composed of dream sequences) and the script, occasionally ad-libbing when he does not quite understand the script. He also tells the viewer to "just go with it" when the script seems to make no sense.

Literal humor is also important to the show's style. Phrases and expressions such as "Hold the phone!" or "wild goose chase" are usually followed by literal interpretations of the phrase mentioned. A running gag in the show, for example, is that whenever a character exclaims "Great Scott!" a Scottish man appears and says, "Yes?" Another example is that, whenever the phrase "Hold the phone!" is said, Lisa Rentel is seen holding a phone.

== Episodes ==
Season	Episodes	Originally released	
Season	Episodes	First released	Last released
Pilot		August 18, 2000	
1	13	November 17, 2000	July 29, 2001
2	13	December 2, 2001	April 7, 2002

=== Pilot (2000) ===
No.	Title	Directed by	Written by	Original release date	Prod. code
Pilot	"In the Baa-ginning"	Mo Willems	Mo Willems	August 18, 2000	000
Sheep leaves Farmer John's farm in pursuit of a happy life in the big city. Guest Stars: Christine Walters

=== Season 1 (2000–01) ===
No.	Title	Directed by	Written by	Original release date	Prod. code
1	"Be Still My Bleat-ing Heart!"	Karen Villarreal	Mo Willems	November 17, 2000	101
Sheep falls in love with a poodle named Swanky. Unfortunately, Swanky's owner, Lady Richington, hates sheep. Guest Stars: Christine Walters
2	"To Bleat or Not to Bleat!"	Mike de Sève	Mo Willems	November 24, 2000	102
A girl named Lisa Rentel "saves" Sheep from General Specific so that she can keep him as a pet against his will.
3	"Belle of the Baaaah!"	Maurice Joyce	David Wain	December 1, 2000	103
Sheep gets more than he bargained for when he accidentally swallows a diamond and becomes the center of the town's attention.
4	"Going Off the Sheep End!"	Sue Perrotto	Joey Mazzarino	December 8, 2000	104
Sheep tries to get Swanky's attention by making changes to himself.
5	"Home for the Baaa-lidays!"	Karen Villarreal	Mo Willems	December 29, 2000	107
Sheep returns to the farm for the commercialized holiday Clearance Day, with General Specific in hot pursuit.
6	"Can't Live Without Ewe!"	Karen Villarreal	Mo Willems	January 12, 2001	105
Sheep enters a fake sheep convention set up by the military wearing a mustache. Farmer John misses him, and hires the German Shepherd to bring Sheep home.
7	"15 Muttons of Fame!"	Maurice Joyce	Mo Willems	January 26, 2001	106
When an agent for a dish washing commercial discovers Sheep, he decides to become a model to avoid General Specific. However, he might have to sacrifice his friends in the process.
8	"The Agony of De-Bleat!"	Sue Perrotto	Mo Willems	March 2, 2001	108
General Specific finally captures Sheep and fires all of his soldiers. However, the crew decides to free Sheep to get their jobs back.
9	"Baaa-ck in Time!"	Karen Villarreal	Joey Mazzarino	March 23, 2001	109
Sheep travels through time to find a better life.
10	"Fleeced to Meet You!"	Maurice Joyce	Mo Willems	June 10, 2001	110
General Specific hires X-Agent to befriend Sheep and entrap him so they can use him for the sheep powered ray gun. X-Agent successfully entraps Sheep but later changes his mind because he realizes that friendship with Sheep mattered more.
11	"A Star Is Shorn!"	Maurice Joyce	David Wain	June 24, 2001	111
Sheep discovers his talent for spinning plates.
12	"Mistaken Identi-Sheep!"	Sue Perrotto	Joey Mazzarino	July 8, 2001	112
A sheep-like creature robs the town, while Sheep is blamed.
13	"To Sheep, Perchance to Dream!"	Karen Villarreal	Mo Willems	July 29, 2001	113
An episode about the nightmares of people in the Big City.

=== Season 2 (2001–02) ===
No. overall	No. in season	Title	Directed by	Written by	Original release date	Prod. code
14	1	"Wish You Were Shear!"	Karen Villarreal	Story by: Mo Willems; Weird Bits by: Joey Mazzarino	December 2, 2001	201
Sheep buys a bone for Swanky as an anniversary gift, but a dogcatcher (who mistakes Sheep for a dog due to the bone) throws him in the pound, where he is adopted by Lisa Rentel. Guest Stars: Fran Brill, Christine Walters
15	2	"Baah-Dern Times"	Sue Perrotto	Mo Willems	December 9, 2001	202
With the entire cast of "Sheep in the Big City" sick, the audience shall instead, watch an old black-and-white silent film featuring the ancestors and relatives of the cast. Guest Stars: Fran Brill
16	3	"Flock, Up in the Sky!"	Mr. Warburton	Mo Willems	December 16, 2001	203
X-Agent returns and swears to protect Sheep from General Specific, but Sheep doesn't want his help. Guest Stars: Christine Walters
17	4	"My, How Ewe Have Changed!"	Karen Villarreal	Mo Willems	December 23, 2001	204
Sheep is invited back to Farmer John's farm for a reunion.
18	5	"The Wool of the People"	Mr. Warburton	Mo Willems	February 10, 2002	206
General Specific cannot capture Sheep because of a law implemented by the mayor of the Big City, but with the current mayor leaving office, he campaigns to be the new mayor.
19	6	"Party of the Shear!"	Sue Perrotto	Mo Willems	February 17, 2002	205
To escape the clutches of the secret military organization, Sheep enters a dance club which General Specific is "not cool enough for."
20	7	"Daddy Shear-est!"	Karen Villarreal	Mo Willems	February 24, 2002	207
Private Public is visited by his father, General Public, who assists him in trying to capture Sheep. Guest Stars: Jerry L. Nelson
21	8	"The Wool Is Not Enough!"	Sue Perrotto	Story by: Mo Willems; Weird Bits by: David Wain	March 3, 2002	208
Tired of the Angry Scientist's failures, General Specific hires Dr. Oh No No No to help him capture Sheep. However, the doctor has own his agenda.
22	9	"Beauty and the Bleats!"	Mr. Warburton	Mo Willems	March 10, 2002	209
Sheep is turned into a human-sheep hybrid by a Genie to get in Swanky's new mansion.
23	10	"An Officer and a Gentle-lamb!"	Karen Villarreal	Mo Willems	March 17, 2002	210
The military organization gets Sheep fired from his job as barber and he sets out to find a new job. Guest Stars: Ruth Buzzi, Christine Walters
24	11	"Oh, the Ewe-manity!"	Sue Perrotto	Story by: Mo Willems; Weird Bits by: Joey Mazzarino	March 24, 2002	211
General Specific cannot capture Sheep because he is too small for his net, so he makes him grow to the size of a giant using an enlarging ray.
25	12	"Here Goes Mutton!"	Mr. Warburton	Story by: Mo Willems; Weird Bits by: Joey Mazzarino & Mo Willems	March 31, 2002	212
Farmer John becomes a football player, while Sheep comes down with amnesia from a hit on the head.
26	13	"Baa-hind the Scenes!"	Karen Villarreal	Mo Willems	April 7, 2002	213
Sheep and his manager have a lunch meeting behind the scenes. General Specific tries to cancel the show, but is talked into leaving Sheep alone by the show's writer when he is threatened with being replaced by a new character. Guest Stars: Christine Walters

== Merchandise ==
=== Home media ===
The first season was available on iTunes. However, it was taken off of iTunes for unknown reasons. In the United Kingdom, three episodes (excluding the pilot) were released on a DVD in region 2 format. The pilot is on the Powerpuff Girls "Powerpuff Bluff" DVD and also on the Powerpuff Girls "Dream Scheme" VHS tape (although there was an intentional mislead on the back cover of the tape saying it has a bonus episode of fellow cartoon Courage the Cowardly Dog).

In 2022, most of the series became available for streaming on HBO Max in Latin America with both English and Spanish dubs available.

=== Toys and promotions ===
In July 2000, Lisa Richardson, then-Vice President of Entertainment Marketing at Turner Network Sales, announced a promotion for Sheep in the Big City as part of a larger advertising effort for Turner Broadcasting System. From May 28 until July 8, 2001, Subway restaurants promoted Sheep in the Big City by including one of four toys based on characters from the series in their Subway Kids' Pak meals in the United States and Canada.

== Other appearances ==
Sheep and Swanky appear as playable characters in Cartoon Network Speedway (2003).

Sheep has a cameo role in the OK K.O.! Let's Be Heroes crossover special "Crossover Nexus" (2018) as one of the many Cartoon Network heroes who is summoned and defeated by Strike.
