= List of Codename: Kids Next Door episodes =

Codename: Kids Next Door is an American animated television series created by Mr. Warburton and produced by Curious Pictures and Cartoon Network Studios. The series debuted on Cartoon Network in the United States on December 6, 2002, and ended on January 21, 2008, with the special episode "Operation: I.N.T.E.R.V.I.E.W.S.". The series follows the adventures of a diverse group of five 10-year-old children who operate from a high-tech treehouse, fighting against adult and teen villains with advanced 2×4 technology. Using their code names (Numbuhs 1, 2, 3, 4, and 5), they are Sector V, part of a global organization called the Kids Next Door.

Each season consists of 13 episodes, most of which are composed of two 11-minute stories, making about 26 segments per season. There are also several full-length 22-minute episodes. Each title is in the form of an acronym that gives the viewer clues as to what the plot is. Tie-in media includes comic books, trading cards, toys, and two compilation DVDs released in 2004 and 2005, titled Sooper Hugest Missions: File One and File Two.

== Series overview ==
Season	Segments	Episodes	Originally released	
Season	Segments	Episodes	First released	Last released
Pilots	N/A	2	November 6, 1998	July 20, 2001
1	24	13	December 6, 2002	March 7, 2003
2	25	13	October 3, 2003	June 4, 2004
3	23	13	June 11, 2004	November 12, 2004
4	22	13	November 19, 2004	July 22, 2005
5	22	13	September 25, 2005	August 24, 2006
6	21	13	August 2, 2006	November 23, 2007
Specials	N/A	3	August 11, 2006	January 21, 2008

== Episodes ==
=== Pilots (1998–2001) ===
Warburton originally pitched "Diseasy Does It", his Hanna-Barbera-produced short for a series titled Kenny and the Chimp, with "Those Kids Next Door" planned as recurring characters. When the plot was refined to have the "Kids Next Door" as main characters, Warburton created "No P in the Ool", a series pilot produced by Cartoon Network Studios. The pilot was broadcast in 2001 as part of the network's The Big Pick II event, a marathon of similar pilot shorts resulting in a viewer poll to determine which series should be greenlit for a full series, and "No P in the Ool" won that poll.

No.	Title	Directed by	Written by	Storyboarded by	Original release date	Prod. code
1	"Kenny and the Chimp: Diseasy Does It! Or Chimp N'Pox"	Mr. Warburton	Story by : Tom Warburton	Tom Warburton	November 6, 1998	001
1	"Kenny and the Chimp: Diseasy Does It! Or Chimp N'Pox"	Mr. Warburton	Story by : Tom Warburton	Tom Warburton	January 31, 2003 (rerun)	101b
Professor XXXL, a mad scientist, hires Kenny and his pet chimpanzee Chimpy to catalog the newest additions to his collection of deadly diseases while he goes off to fight the local parent–teacher association. Kenny has to keep the laboratory in order while Chimpy wreaks havoc with the disease specimens. Note: The pilot and the only produced episode for Warburton's cancelled series Kenny and the Chimp. A working title for the episode was "Chimp N'Pox". It is featured as part of the first episode of Codename: Kids Next Door.
2	"No P in the Ool"	Mr. Warburton	Mr. Warburton	TBA	July 20, 2001	002
2	"No P in the Ool"	Mr. Warburton	Mr. Warburton	TBA	January 31, 2003 (rerun)	101c
When the villainous Mr. Wink and Mr. Fibb extend the adult swim time in the neighborhood pool, the Kids Next Door are sent a red alert to stop them. Numbuh 1 suggests employing the Kid-A-Pault, a Kids Next Door weapon to put an end to this tyranny...but their plan fails, leaving them to find other means of battling Mr. Wink and Mr. Fibb.

=== Season 1 (2002–03) ===
No. overall	No. in season	Title	Directed by	Written by	Storyboarded by	Original release date	Prod. code
1	1	"Operation: C.A.K.E.D." "Capturize And Kidnapify Enemy Dessert"	Sue Perrotto	Mr. Warburton	Maurice Fontenot	January 31, 2003	101a
The Kids Next Door attempt to stop a birthday party for their arch-enemies, the Delightful Children from Down the Lane. The task is made complicated by the presence of the Big Badolescent, a girl who grows alarmingly in size and strength when she does not get her way. Note: This episode is only seven minutes long and is paired with "Diseasy Does It" and "No P in the Ool" when aired. Although the episode is also chronologically the first, it was not the first episode aired. "Operation: I.-S.C.R.E.A.M." and "Operation: C.A.N.N.O.N.", the second produced episodes, aired as the series premiere on December 6, 2002, while this episode didn't air until January 31, 2003.
2a	2a	"Operation: I.-S.C.R.E.A.M." "Important – Steal Creamy Refrigerated Edibles – Avoid Meltdown"	Randy Myers	Mr. Warburton & Mo Willems	Matt Peters	December 6, 2002	102a
The group catches wind of some ice cream men who refuse to give ice cream to children, so they interrogate them and get the password to their ice cream factory, only to be in for a major surprise from the Delightful Children from Down the Lane, because the ice cream that they take turns into a monster that tries to eat them, but eventually gets defeated by a heater that was turned on by Numbuh 3.
2b	2b	"Operation: C.A.N.N.O.N." "Cannon And Nap-time Not Occurring Normally"	Robert Alvarez	Mo Willems & Mr. Warburton	Bob Suarez	December 6, 2002	102b
Numbuh 4 forces the other operatives to build a "clam cannon" when Numbuh 1 leaves.
3a	3a	"Operation: N.O.-P.O.W.U.H." "New Orders – Pulverize Opposition without Utilizing Hamsters"	Yvette Kaplan	Mo Willems & Mr. Warburton	Kim Arndt	December 13, 2002	103a
The hamsters that power Sector V's weapons suddenly decide to go on vacation, leaving the Treehouse powerless! Meanwhile, the Delightful Children from Down the Lane looks for villains to attack Sector V, so they send an old lady named Gramma Stuffum, who is fixated on fattening kids, to Sector V's powerless HQ.
3b	3b	"Operation: T.E.E.T.H." "Tooth Extracting Enemy Terrorizes Headquarters"	Sue Perrotto	Mr. Warburton & Mo Willems	Joe St. Pierre	December 13, 2002	103b
The Kids Next Door find a new enemy in the dental hygiene-obsessed vigilante, Knightbrace, after he attacks Numbuh 3 on the way back from a trip to the candy store.
4a	4a	"Operation: P.I.R.A.T.E." "Pirates Invade Repository And Treats Extracted"	Rick Leon	Rob Leighton, Mr. Warburton, & Mo Willems	Tom Connor	December 20, 2002	104a
Captain Stickybeard and his Candy Pirate crew steal Sector V's candy, including Numbuh 5's secret stash. Numbuh 5 does not want her candy stash to be taken, so she boards Stickybeard's pirate ship to retrieve it, but ends up getting kidnapped along with the loot. The KND have to rescue her and the candy too.
4b	4b	"Operation: C.O.W.G.I.R.L." "Crazy Old Woman Goes Increasingly Really Loco"	Sue Perrotto	Tom Eaton, Mr. Warburton, & Mo Willems	Tony Eastman	December 20, 2002	104b
An adult named Lasso Lass (who keeps acting like a kid) wants to help Sector V defeat Mr. Wink and Mr. Fibb.
5a	5a	"Operation: T.U.R.N.I.P." "Turnips Unfortunately Reaching Near Infestation Point"	Mr. Warburton	Rob Leighton, Mr. Warburton, & Mo Willems	Guy Moore	December 27, 2002	105a
When turnips are found everywhere in Sector V's treehouse, they go to the source – a giant turnip – to defeat it.
5b	5b	"Operation: M.I.N.I.-G.O.L.F." "Miniaturization Is Now Issue – Golfing Opposite Looney Fanatic"	Joanna Romersa	Mo Willems & Mr. Warburton	Maurice Fontenot	December 27, 2002	105b
After Numbuh 2 beats a mini-golf champion at mini-golf, the golfer shrinks Numbuh 2 and many sights from around the world.
6a	6a	"Operation: O.F.F.I.C.E." "On Fourteenth Floor Is Corporate Evil"	Jeffrey Gatrall	Mr. Warburton & Mo Willems	Kim Arndt	January 3, 2003	106a
When his father brings Numbuh 4 to work for "Bring Your Daughter to Work Day", Numbuh 4 discovers his father's boss plans to send him and all the daughters of his co-workers to Pluto.
6b	6b	"Operation: A.R.C.T.I.C." "Am Really Cold That Is Certain"	Eddie Houchins	Mr. Warburton & Mo Willems	Dave Wachtenheim	January 3, 2003	106b
A fellow operative, Numbuh 30C, is sent to help Sector V stop a villain from using a weather machine to make no more snow days for school. But is there more to this mysterious operative than meets the eye?
7a	7a	"Operation: L.I.C.E." "Lice Interrupt Cheese Eating"	Rick Leon	Rob Leighton, Mr. Warburton, & Mo Willems	Matt Peters	January 10, 2003	107a
The Delightful Children from Down the Lane attack Sector V's headquarters with an infestation of hair-eating lice.
7b	7b	"Operation: L.I.Z.Z.I.E." "Love Is Zesty Zany Insanity Eh?"	Joanna Romersa	Mo Willems & Mr. Warburton	Bob Suarez	January 10, 2003	107b
Numbuh 1 has a secret girlfriend who he often neglects because of his Kids Next Door responsibilities, forcing her to use a boyfriend helmet to mind-control Numbuh 1. If the helmet stays on for too long, it will start to merge with Numbuh 1's head and stay on forever.
8a	8a	"Operation: T.H.E.-F.L.Y." "Tiny Horsefly Examines Five Little Youngsters"	Sue Perrotto	Mo Willems & Mr. Warburton	Guy Moore	January 17, 2003	108a
A fly finds its way into Sector V's headquarters.
8b	8b	"Operation: P.O.I.N.T." "Prowling Operatives Investigate Naughty Teenagers"	Guy Moore	Mr. Warburton & Mo Willems	Tom Connor	January 17, 2003	108b
All of the teenagers in Sector V's hometown have formed a place called The Point, and Numbuh 1 suspects that they are helping the adults.
9a	9a	"Operation: C.A.B.L.E.-T.V." "Crazy Arrogant Baby Loses Every Television Viewer"	Mr. Warburton	Mo Willems & Mr. Warburton	Maurice Fontenot	January 24, 2003	109a
A villainous half-man, half-baby named Mr. B gives the Kids Next Door a television series of their own.
9b	9b	"Operation: C.A.M.P." "Children Are Miserable Parents"	Karen Villarreal	Mo Willems & Mr. Warburton	Kim Arndt	January 24, 2003	109b
A lost baby skunk interferes with a mission to rescue brainwashed campers.
10a	10a	"Operation: T.O.M.M.Y." "Totally Obnoxious Moronic Meddling Youngster"	Joanna Romersa	Mo Willems & Mr. Warburton	Karen Disher	February 7, 2003	110a
Numbuh 2's little brother, Tommy (who is shunned by Sector V), joins forces with a villain, Common Cold.
10b	10b	"Operation: C.H.A.D." "Charming Hero Avoids Destruction"	Rick Leon	Mo Willems & Mr. Warburton	Mike Wetterhahn	February 7, 2003	110b
Two parental villains are stupefying KND operatives around the world; an operative named Chad (Numbuh 274) enlists the help of Sector V.
11a	11a	"Operation: P.I.A.N.O." "Pesky Instrument Advances New Operative"	Sue Perrotto and Yvette Kaplan	Mo Willems & Mr. Warburton	Matt Peters	February 21, 2003	111a
Sector V tries to destroy all the pianos in a truck with a hamster that acts as Numbuh 4's replacement.
11b	11b	"Operation: Z.O.O." "Zoologically Obsessed Octogenarian"	Jeffrey Gatrall	Mo Willems & Mr. Warburton	Bob Suarez	February 21, 2003	111b
Sector V is put into a "kids zoo" and must unite with the Delightful Children from Down the Lane and get all the other children out of their cages before lunch time to escape being fed to the zoo's cannibal bully.
12a	12a	"Operation: Q.U.I.E.T." "Quietude Unlikely in Entire Treehouse"	Guy Moore	Mo Willems & Mr. Warburton	Guy Moore	February 28, 2003	112a
Numbuh 5 tries to keep the treehouse quiet, so Numbuh 1 can sleep.
12b	12b	"Operation: R.A.I.N.B.O.W.S." "Running Amok in Nature's Bounty Observing Wild Simians"	Mr. Warburton	Mo Willems & Mr. Warburton	Matt Peters & Tom Connor	February 28, 2003	112b
The boss of Rainbow Monkeys Inc. uses Numbuh 3 to find real Rainbow Monkeys for him.
13	13	"Operation: G.R.O.W.-U.P." "Getting Really Old Will Upset Plans"	Joanna Romersa and Sue Perrotto	Mo Willems & Mr. Warburton	Kim Arndt & Maurice Fontenot	March 7, 2003	113
The frustrated Delightful Children from Down the Lane turn to their Father for help destroying Sector V. Numbuh 1 is turned into an adult, the treehouse is destroyed, and their faith is shattered; Sector V is forced into a showdown with their most dangerous foe yet.

=== Season 2 (2003–04) ===
No. overall	No. in season	Title	Directed by	Written by	Storyboarded by	Original release date	Prod. code
14a	1a	"Operation: C.A.T.S." "Crazy Aged Tyrant Stinks"	Rick Leon	Mo Willems & Mr. Warburton	Kim Arndt & Jesse Schmal	October 3, 2003	201a
Numbuh 4 is mistaken for a cat by an old lady after being stuffed in a kitty costume from his dispute with Numbuh 3.
14b	1b	"Operation: P.O.P." "Pre-teens Oppose Prohibition"	Joanna Romersa	Mr. Warburton & Mo Willems	Matt Peters & Abigail Nesbitt	October 3, 2003	201b
The KND's soda pop is sought out by an evil industrialist. The legal age for drinking soda has been changed to Everyone 13+. Numbuh 2 is caught selling illegal soda at a local bar and discovers a conspiracy to bottle kids.
15a	2a	"Operation: S.P.A.N.K." "Sore Posteriors Annoy Naughty Kids"	Randy Myers	Mr. Warburton & Mo Willems	Maurice Fontenot & Bob Suarez	October 10, 2003	202a
Count Spankulot joins the KND and turns from his evil ways.
15b	2b	"Operation: D.A.T.E." "Dance Actually Threatens Everyone"	Kevin Petrilak	Mo Willems & Mr. Warburton	Guy Moore & Quack Leard	October 10, 2003	202b
The KND and nearly every kid in town are invited to a dance at the DCFDTL's mansion. However, it was actually a trap, all the party guests (except Numbuh 1 and Lizzie) are "delightfulized" like the DCFDTL.
16a	3a	"Operation: S.U.P.P.O.R.T." "Special Underwire Protection Proportedly Outfits Rotten Teenagers"	Robert Alvarez	Mr. Warburton & Mo Willems	Kim Arndt & Jesse Schmal	October 17, 2003	203a
Numbuhs 1 and 2 try to find out about Cree's B.R.A. (Battle Ready Armor).
16b	3b	"Operation: T.A.P.I.O.C.A." "Teens And Pudding Inconvenience Our Childish Agents"	Jeffrey Gatrall	Mo Willems & Mr. Warburton	Matt Peters & Abigail Nesbitt	October 17, 2003	203b
Numbuh 2's grandmother joins forces with her friends to locate a pudding supply, which was trapped between the surface of the treehouse.
17a	4a	"Operation: M.O.V.I.E." "Meeting Of Villains Isn't Entertaining"	Karl Fischer	Mo Willems & Mr. Warburton	Maurice Fontenot & Bob Suarez	October 24, 2003	204a
Numbuh 4 tries to sneak into an R-rated movie to find it is a secret villain meeting.
17b	4b	"Operation: F.A.S.T.-F.O.O.D." "Find Another Stupid Task For Our Oblivious Dodo"	Eddy Houchins	Mo Willems & Mr. Warburton	Guy Moore & Quack Leard	October 24, 2003	204b
Numbuh 3 is sent on a mission for her birthday: to get a fast food meal. The restaurant is later revealed to actually be for sharks, with kids being murdered for food.
18a	5a	"Operation: S.H.A.V.E." "Southern Hair Attacks Virtually Everyone"	Rick Leon	Mr. Warburton & Mo Willems	Matt Peters & Abigail Nesbitt	October 31, 2003	205a
The KND investigate why people are getting mustaches. They end up showdowning the "head mustache", but they're in for a surprise of who's to blame.
18b	5b	"Operation: O.O.M.P.P.A.H." "Obnoxious Overzealous Male Parent Plays Annoying Horn"	Joanna Romersa	Mr. Warburton & Mo Willems	Kim Arndt & Jesse Schmal	October 31, 2003	205b
Numbuh 1's dad is grabbed by a fishing line along with other dads on the lake, and pulled up to some kid's house above the water. He decides that Numbuh 1's dad is his new dad, so Numbuh 1 battles it out with the sousaphone-playing dork for his father.
19a	6a	"Operation: F.L.A.V.O.R." "Find Lost Ancient Variety Of Refreshment"	Guy Moore	Mo Willems & Mr. Warburton	Guy Moore & Quack Leard	November 7, 2003	206a
Numbuh 5 is kidnapped and sent to a temple to find a mystical flavor of ice-cream known as "The Fourth Flavor" for the DCFDTL. She dreams to have a chance at tasting the long-lost flavor herself, for only those with pure taste buds may taste it.
19b	6b	"Operation: K.I.S.S." "Kid's Identity Suddenly Sixteen"	Jeffrey Gatrall	Mo Willems & Mr. Warburton	Maurice Fontenot & Bob Suarez	November 7, 2003	206b
Numbuh 2 is turned into a teenager when an experiment goes horribly wrong, but gets smooth with Numbuh 5's older sister.
20a	7a	"Operation: G.H.O.S.T." "Ghostly Hamsters Overwhelm Spooky Treehouse"	Kevin Petrilak	Mr. Warburton & Mo Willems	Kim Arndt & Jesse Schmal	November 14, 2003	207a
When Sector V (except Numbuh 4) assists Chubbo's funeral, the ghost arrives at night, kidnapping Numbuh 3 and keeping her with all the past dead hamsters powering the treehouse's core.
20b	7b	"Operation: F.U.G.I.T.I.V.E." "Facing Unpleasant Girl's Insulting Taunts Isn't Very Enjoyable"	Eddy Houchins	Mr. Warburton & Mo Willems	Matt Peters & Abigail Nesbitt	November 14, 2003	207b
The KND try to find an escaped moonbase prisoner at the DCFDTL's mansion, but the boys are brought down with Numbuh 86's yelling and complaining.
21a	8a	"Operation: T.H.E.-S.H.O.G.U.N." "Terribly Huge Enemy Steals Heaps Of Gorgonzola Using Ninja"	Guy Moore	Mr. Warburton & Mo Willems	Guy Moore & Quack Leard	November 21, 2003	208a
A new cheesy restaurant opens, but all the cheese is stolen. When Numbuh 2 tries to use his own cheese, he and Numbuh 4 are captured by cheese ninjas.
21b	8b	"Operation: C.O.L.L.E.G.E." "Concerned Operative Leaves Loafers Engaged Goofily Elsewhere"	Karl Fischer	Mo Willems & Mr. Warburton	Maurice Fontenot & Bob Suarez	November 21, 2003	208b
While the others have their day off, Numbuh 1 tries to rescue the ten-year-old accepted into college. He finds out that it was his own brain the Professor XXXL wanted: a test subject to his snow cones, since Numbuh 1 is immune to brain freeze.
22a	9a	"Operation: R.E.P.O.R.T." "Ridiculous Exaggerations Possess Occasional Real Truth"	Karen Villarreal	Mo Willems & Mr. Warburton	Matt Peters & Abigail Nesbitt	December 5, 2003	209a
The KND each give an account of what happened to an ordinary package.
22b	9b	"Operation: B.R.I.E.F." "Big Reward If Enemy Finished"	Joanna Romersa	Brian Meehl, Mo Willems, & Mr. Warburton	Kim Arndt & Jesse Schmal	December 5, 2003	209b
Numbuh 1's underwear is attacking him after finding out how careless children are with underwear.
23a	10a	"Operation: C.A.K.E.D.-T.W.O." "Commandos Attempt Kapturing Enemy Dessert – They Weren't Obliging"	Karl Fischer	Mo Willems & Mr. Warburton	Guy Moore & Quack Leard	December 12, 2003	210a
The KND take it to the skies to stop the DCFDTL's birthday cake.
23b	10b	"Operation: S.P.A.C.E." "Sister's Playful Anarchy Causes Emergency"	Kevin Petrilak	Mr. Warburton & Mo Willems	Maurice Fontenot & Bob Suarez	December 12, 2003	210b
After a spaceship crash caused by Numbuh 3's sister, the KND search an abandoned prisoner transport and discover that they're not alone.
24a	11a	"Operation: B.E.A.C.H." "Boys Enthusiastically Attempt Chivalrous Heroics"	Karen Villarreal	Mo Willems & Mr. Warburton	Kim Arndt & Jesse Schmal	May 21, 2004	211a
A king kidnaps Numbuh 3 and forces her to marry him, but she agrees because she thinks they're pretending. Meanwhile, Numbuh 4 will fight King Sandy for Numbuh 3 to save her.
24b	11b	"Operation: U.N.D.E.R.C.O.V.E.R." "Unusual New Defector Eagerly Reveals Coffee Operation's Vital Enemy Relevance"	Joanna Romersa	Mo Willems & Mr. Warburton	Matt Peters & Abigail Nesbitt	May 21, 2004	211b
The KND try to close down a coffee drilling rig with a surprising ally, Lenny, one of the DCFDTL.
25a	12a	"Operation: D.O.G.F.I.G.H.T." "Dueling Over Gooey Frankfurters Invariably Gives Hoagie Trouble"	Guy Moore	Mo Willems & Mr. Warburton	Guy Moore & Quack Leard	May 28, 2004	212a
Numbuh 2 is shot out of the sky by another pilot countless times, who he thinks is a threat.
25b	12b	"Operation: T.R.I.P." "Twins Reconnaissance Increases Peril"	Kevin Petrilak	Mo Willems & Mr. Warburton	Maurice Fontenot & Bob Suarez	May 28, 2004	212b
Numbuh 3 is followed by the ITFBTM (Interesting Twins from Beneath the Mountain), the cousins of the DCFDTL, when she goes to Japan, so they can infiltrate the Japanese KND headquarters.
26	13	"Operation: E.N.D." "Everyone Nearly Decommissioned"	Sue Perrotto and Karen Villarreal	Mo Willems & Mr. Warburton	Matt Peters, Kim Arndt, Abigail Nesbitt, & Jesse Schmal	June 4, 2004	213
Numbuh 86 arrives at the KND treehouse and captures Numbuhs 2, 3, 4, and 5 for decommissioning. Numbuh 1, having previously eluded Numbuh 86, immediately sets out to determine who's ordering the wrongful decommissioning of scores of KND operatives.

=== Season 3 (2004) ===
No. overall	No. in season	Title	Directed by	Written by	Storyboarded by	Original release date	Prod. code
27	1	"Operation: F.U.T.U.R.E." "Female's Utopian Trap Unleashes Reprehensible Evil"	Robert Alvarez and Rick Leon	Mo Willems & Mr. Warburton	Kim Arndt, Matt Peters, Jesse Schmal, & Abigail Nesbitt	June 11, 2004	301
Numbuh 4 learns he is to be sent to a boarding school – but he is not worried, as he's always escaped from them before. However, he then learns that the school is being run by an evil kid called "Madame Margaret", a girl who is getting high-tech aid from none other than her future self. Madame Margaret's abominable plan is to create a twisted utopia where girls rule the world, using a demonic weapon called the girlifying ray that can turn anything feminine. The team does not have much chance to stop this until they receive aid from Numbuh 4's own future self. Now the team must defeat her and save the future.
28a	2a	"Operation: A.F.L.O.A.T." "Agents Feared Lost On Awful Tide"	Kieran Dowling	Mr. Warburton & Mo Willems	Guy Moore & Quack Leard	June 18, 2004	302a
The KND crashland into a sea of asparagus, and find out that they have more to worry about than staying afloat.
28b	2b	"Operation: L.E.A.D.E.R." "Lizzie Enthusiastically Assumes Daring Executive Role"	Maurice Joyce	Mo Willems & Mr. Warburton	Maurice Fontenot & Bob Suarez	June 18, 2004	302b
Lizzie Devine takes over the KND, and puts herself in Numbuh 1's place.
29a	3a	"Operation: U.T.O.P.I.A." "Uncovering The Only Perfect Island Accidentally"	Rick Leon	Mo Willems & Mr. Warburton	Kim Arndt & Jesse Schmal	June 25, 2004	303a
Numbuh 1 discovers an island paradise populated by kids. Numbuh 1 finds a perfect island, with much candy, fun and no adults. However, he deduces something unusual is happening and has to do with Chester's Happy Headband.
29b	3b	"Operation: R.O.B.B.E.R.S." "Rather Ornery Bandits Burglarize Educationally Required Schoolwork"	Eddy Houchins	Mr. Warburton & Mo Willems	Matt Peters & Abigail Nesbitt	June 25, 2004	303b
The Six-Gum Gang is stealing everyone's homework on a school bus for the DCFDTL.
30	4	"Operation: F.O.U.N.T.A.I.N." "Figure Out Unusual Nerd's Tantalizing And Impossible Necessity"	Rick Leon and Maurice Joyce	Mr. Warburton & Mo Willems	Guy Moore, Maurice Fontenot, Quack Leard, & Bob Suarez	July 9, 2004	304
The DCFDTL kidnap the team's classmate, a nerdy, spit-talking girl named Leaky-Leona and force her to lead them to the dark underbellies of the school. Alerted by Numbuh 5, the team follows them, and find themselves in an ancient school, laden with deadly booby traps. Avoiding them all, the team finds Leaky-Leona, strangely aged to an old woman, who leads them to the mythical Fountain of Youth. The KND are amazed at the prospect of remaining ten-years-old forever.
31a	5a	"Operation: B.U.T.T." "Blackmail Uncovers Titanic Tush"	Maurice Joyce	Mo Willems & Mr. Warburton	Kim Arndt & Jesse Schmal	July 16, 2004	305a
The DCFDTL plants Numbuh 1 from his swim trunks and get photos of his disproportionately huge buttocks. They black mail him with them.
31b	5b	"Operation: T.R.A.I.N.I.N.G." "Tiny Recruits Ambushed In Nefarious Invasion Need Guts"	Rick Leon	Mo Willems & Mr. Warburton	Matt Peters & Abigail Nesbitt	July 16, 2004	305b
Tommy, Sonia, and Lee find that the training simulations in the Arctic Base are real.
32a	6a	"Operation: A.R.C.H.I.V.E." "Ancient Recorded Children's History Is Very Enlightening"	Rick Leon	Mr. Warburton & Mo Willems	Guy Moore & Quack Leard	July 23, 2004	306a
An archive is shown of the origin and story creation of adults, and their rebellion of children. Numbuh 1 narrates on how adults were created, how they took control, and families were made. The story takes its format from the segment The Second Renaissance from The Animatrix.
32b	6b	"Operation: S.L.U.M.B.E.R." "Stupid Little Undercover Mission Becomes Exciting Romp"	Kieran Dowling	Mr. Warburton, Mo Willems, & Alison Wilgus	Maurice Fontenot & Bob Suarez	July 23, 2004	306b
Numbuh 86 is having a top-secret girls-only mission. Numbuh 4 is willing to find out what the mission is all about even if it means having to put on a little make-up. It turns out to only be a slumber party, but then it turns into a real mission.
33a	7a	"Operation: P.I.N.K.E.Y.E." "Private Investigator's New Kase Extra Yucky Epidemic"	Robert Alvarez	Mo Willems & Mr. Warburton	Matt Peters & Abigail Nesbitt	July 30, 2004	307a
Numbuh 2 investigates a pink eye outbreak in Gallagher Elementary in a noir style. An epidemic of conjunctivitis (pink-eye) has taken several victims. Numbuh 2 must investigate if the cases are coincidental or if a certain nurse is causing them.
33b	7b	"Operation: K.A.S.T.L.E." "Kuki And Sister Torpedo Loathsome Engagement"	Eddy Houchins	Mr. Warburton, Mo Willems, & Alison Wilgus	Kim Arndt & Jesse Schmal	July 30, 2004	307b
Numbuh 3 is forced to be married to King Sandy (again) when she is at a Rainbow Monkey theme park, but the others will not believe her.
34a	8a	"Operation: C.A.K.E.D.-T.H.R.E.E." "Commandos Attempt Kapturing Enemy's Dessert – They Have Real Extreme Eggravation"	Maurice Joyce	Billy Aronson, Mo Willems, & Mr. Warburton	Guy Moore & Quack Leard	August 6, 2004	308a
It is the DCFDTL's birthday once again, and as always, the KND go to rob their nemeses of their ever-delicious birthday cake. However, their plan to neutralize them by egging them goes wrong as chicks hatch from every single egg.
34b	8b	"Operation: L.O.C.K.D.O.W.N." "Lurking Otherworldly Childhood Kalamity Delivers Ouchies When Naughty"	Gordon Kent	Mr. Warburton & Mo Willems	Maurice Fontenot & Bob Suarez	August 6, 2004	308b
Numbuh 5 tries to find an intruder in the KND treehouse. Numbuh 1 orders a complete lock-down of the treehouse but the enemy is already inside, and one by one the operatives are getting spanked. In the end, the KND start spanking!
35a	9a	"Operation: H.U.G.S." "Humongously Unwieldy Gorilla Showdown"	Kieran Dowling	Mo Willems & Mr. Warburton	Kim Arndt & Jesse Schmal	August 13, 2004	309a
Numbuh 4's disgust at anything Rainbow Monkey only increases when he finds himself trapped on Rainbow Monkey Island with a gargantuan, monstrous Rainbow Monkey Kong. He tries to teach it to be a dangerous monster, but all it can do is love.
35b	9b	"Operation: J.E.W.E.L.S." "Juvenile Escapes With Extremely Luscious Sweet"	Eddie Houchins	Mo Willems & Mr. Warburton	Matt Peters & Abigail Nesbitt	August 13, 2004	309b
Numbuh 5 journeys to the exotic Al-Shugar Desert to recover her stolen candy, the Blurpleberry Supreme, and discovers she's not the only one searching for the powerful, mystical candy.
36	10	"Operation: G.R.A.D.U.A.T.E.S." "Gargantuan Ray's Advance Decimates Unprepared And Terrified Escaping Soldiers"	Kieran Dowling and Maurice Joyce	Mo Willems & Mr. Warburton	Maurice Fontenot, Guy Moore, Bob Suarez, & Quack Leard	August 6, 2004	310
The Code Module is recovered by Sector V in time for Tommy to graduate. However, the information inside of it is used by Father to turn every single operative into an animal, leaving Tommy the last one who's not transformed into an animal since he removed his DNA from the Code Module in order to save the KND.
37a	11a	"Operation: T.R.I.C.K.Y." "Trivial Rival Instigates Candy Krazy Yearning"	Robert Alvarez	Mo Willems & Mr. Warburton	Kim Arndt & Jesse Schmal	October 29, 2004	311a
Numbuh 4 tries to get his candy back from Stickybeard on Halloween.
37b	11b	"Operation: U.N.C.O.O.L." "Undead's Nocturnal Craving Overtakes Operative's Love"	Gordon Kent	Mr. Warburton & Mo Willems	Matt Peters & Abigail Nesbitt	October 29, 2004	311b
The KND try to find Numbuh 78 in a treehouse infested with Nerd Zombies.
38a	12a	"Operation: P.R.E.S.I.D.E.N.T." "Protection Requires Extreme Skill Involving Democratically Elected Notable's Transportation"	Maurice Joyce	Mo Willems & Mr. Warburton	Guy Moore & Quack Leard	November 5, 2004	312a
The KND try to get the Fourth Grade Class President to his Town Council meetings safely.
38b	12b	"Operation: H.O.S.P.I.T.A.L." "Hurt Operative Safely Protected In Totally Antiseptic Location"	Eddie Houchins	Mr. Warburton & Mo Willems	Maurice Fontenot & Bob Suarez	November 5, 2004	312b
An important operative suffers an accident on a dangerous mission and is sent to the hospital, but one ex-KND member is out to scramblify his brain, and Sector V must make sure he is safe.
39a	13a	"Operation: S.P.R.O.U.T." "Sickening Produce Removal Operation Ultra Tricky"	Kieran Dowling	Mo Willems & Mr. Warburton	Matt Peters & Abigail Nesbitt	November 12, 2004	313a
Numbuh 4 accidentally eats a brussels sprout, sending the rest of the KND on an emergency Fantastic Voyage to stop the dreaded vegetable from being digested.
39b	13b	"Operation: H.O.U.N.D." "Homework Obliterated Using Nefarious Dog"	Robert Alvarez	Mo Willems & Mr. Warburton	Kim Arndt & Jesse Schmal	November 12, 2004	313b
Numbuh 5 comes face to face with a vicious dog who is always eating her homework.

=== Season 4 (2004–05) ===
No. overall	No. in season	Title	Directed by	Written by	Storyboarded by	Original release date	Prod. code
40a	1a	"Operation: R.A.B.B.I.T." "Rescue Aids Beloved Bunny In Trouble"	Rick Leon	Mr. Warburton & Mo Willems	Kim Arndt & Jesse Schmal	November 19, 2004	401a
Numbuhs 2 and 5 travel through the school jungle gym to help find the First Grade's missing pet bunny, Mr. Fluffalupagus, from Heinrich Von Marzipan, who kidnapped him and plans on making chocolate bunnies from real bunnies by dipping them into the chocolate volcano.
40b	1b	"Operation: F.L.U.S.H." "Foolish Loser Undoes Sinister Hopes"	Gordon Kent	Mo Willems & Mr. Warburton	Maurice Fontenot & Bob Suarez	November 19, 2004	401b
Mr. Boss, Knightbrace, Mr. Wink & Mr. Fibb, and the Crazy Old Cat Lady are taking over the treehouse of Sector V, and the Toiletnator tries to get rid of the KND for good, or so he thinks.
41a	2a	"Operation: F.O.O.D.F.I.T.E." "Fiendish Old Ogre's Disgusting Food Is Thrown Everywhere"	Karen Villarreal	Mr. Warburton & Mo Willems	Kim Arndt, Jesse Schmal, & Anthony Davis	November 26, 2004	402a
Gramma Stuffum forces the kids to eat her food.
41b	2b	"Operation: C.L.U.E.S." "Cutlery's Location Uncovers Elementary Solution"	Robert Alvarez	Mo Willems & Mr. Warburton	Matt Peters & Abigail Nesbitt	November 26, 2004	402b
Numbuh 3's family are invited to Numbuh 2's house, where Mrs. Gilligan is hoping to get a promotion out of this. It is later revealed that the Rainbow Monkey is stabbed by a fork.
42a	3a	"Operation: N.U.G.G.E.T." "Numbuh Uncovers Glistening Golden Edible Treat"	Maurice Joyce	Mo Willems & Mr. Warburton	Guy Moore & Quack Leard	December 3, 2004	403a
Numbuh 4 tries to protect chicken nugget mines from the DCFDTL.
42b	3b	"Operation: M.A.C.A.R.R.O.N.I." "Museum's Artwork Cruelly And Recklessly Ripped Off Nearly Impossibly"	Kieran Dowling	Mo Willems & Mr. Warburton	Maurice Fontenot & Bob Suarez	December 3, 2004	403b
The KND try to protect the Macaroni Museum of Art from being ransacked, with the worst KND operative ever, Marty Sullivan (aka Numbuh 13), on their side.
43	4	"Operation: P.O.O.L." "Prevent Opposite Operative's Larceny"	Gordon Kent and Robert Alvarez	Mo Willems & Mr. Warburton	Kim Arndt, Matt Peters, Jesse Schmal, & Abigail Nesbitt	December 10, 2004	404
Numbuh 4's new pool is actually a portal to an alternate version of the KND Universe where their counterparts known as the DNK (Destructively Nefarious Kids) are evil. The kids do all the adults' job whereas the adults sit around and play video games. While swimming in the pool, Lizzie is captured by an evil opposite of herself, Eizzil Enived (Lizzie's name backwards), and Nigel follows the captor back to her home universe.
44	5	"Operation: C.A.K.E.D.-F.O.U.R." "Children's Annual Kompetition Exposes Devilishly For One Ultimate Race"	Robert Alvarez and Kieran Dowling	Mr. Warburton & Mo Willems	Guy Moore, Maurice Fontenot, Quack Leard, & Bob Suarez	February 21, 2005	405
The KND tube race to get the DCFDTL's delicious birthday cake.
45a	6a	"Operation: S.I.T.T.E.R." "Sweetheart's Involvement Transforms The Evening's Reality"	Robert Alvarez	Mo Willems & Mr. Warburton	Kim Arndt & Jesse Schmal	April 29, 2005	406a
Numbuh 2's mom has to go out, so she finds Cree to babysit Tommy and him.
45b	6b	"Operation: S.A.T.U.R.N." "Stuff Abducted Turns Up Revolving Nowhere"	Kieran Dowling	Mo Willems & Mr. Warburton	Matt Peters & Abigail Nesbitt	April 29, 2005	406b
The KND try to stop a mysterious being from collecting all the Rainbow Monkeys in the world – including Numbuh 3's beloved ones.
46a	7a	"Operation: C.H.O.C.O.L.A.T.E." "Candy Hunting Operative's Chocolatized Opponent Literally A Touchy Enemy"	Eddy Houchins	Mo Willems & Mr. Warburton	Maurice Fontenot & Bob Suarez	May 6, 2005	407a
Numbuh 5 tries to stop Heinrich, now a chocolate monster (recapping the aftermath of "Operation: R.A.B.B.I.T."), from destroying her friends.
46b	7b	"Operation: M.A.T.A.D.O.R." "Misbehaving Agent Teases Adults During Organized Recreation"	Robert Alvarez	Mo Willems & Mr. Warburton	Guy Moore & Quack Leard	May 6, 2005	407b
Numbuh 4 must choose between his job as a KND operative or be a bully fighter.
47a	8a	"Operation: L.U.N.C.H." "Lizzie Underappreciates Nigel's Chowtime Hardworkingness"	Robert Alvarez	Mr. Warburton & Mo Willems	Matt Peters & Abigail Nesbitt	May 13, 2005	408a
Lizzie feels that Nigel works too much during lunch, so she forces him to have lunch with her, but he cannot work. Meanwhile, a group of lunch thieves and their leader Robin Food break into the cafeteria and start stealing everybody's lunches, including Lizzie and Numbuh 1's.
47b	8b	"Operation: M.U.N.C.H.I.E.S." "Morning Uncovers Needed Crunchiness Hiding In Enemy Store"	Rick Leon	Mo Willems & Mr. Warburton	Kim Arndt & Jesse Schmal	May 13, 2005	408b
The KND have run out of Rainbow Munchies, their favorite cereal, so they send out tennis-ball probes to find a box. They find it in Aisle Number 60-teen at the Supervillains Supermarket & Deli, but it is the last one the store has, and it is as popular with the bad guys as it is with the KND!
48a	9a	"Operation: K.N.O.T." "Kids' Necks Overwhelmingly Tied"	Guy Moore	Mr. Warburton & Mo Willems	Guy Moore & Quack Leard	May 20, 2005	409a
Numbuh 1 battles a group of snake ties with an adult against them.
48b	9b	"Operation: C.L.O.S.E.T." "Child Lost On Severely Elevated Tundra"	Kieran Dowling	Mo Willems & Mr. Warburton	Maurice Fontenot & Bob Suarez	May 20, 2005	409b
The KND try to rescue a boy from a monster in the closet.
49	10	"Operation: S.N.O.W.I.N.G." "Sickly Nigel Opposes Warped Incumbent's Nasty Grasp"	Gordon Kent and Maurice Joyce	Mo Willems & Mr. Warburton	Matt Peters, Kim Arndt, Abigail Nesbitt, & Jesse Schmal	May 27, 2005	410
Jimmy Nixon McGarfield (the fourth-grade president) forces the other kids back into school on a first snow day for a special assembly after Numbuh 1 is too sick to play.
50	11	"Operation: M.A.U.R.I.C.E." "Mature Agent Undergoes Reprogramming Into Childhood's Enemy"	Robert Alvarez and Guy Moore	Mo Willems & Mr. Warburton	Maurice Fontenot, Guy Moore, Bob Suarez, & Jesse Schmal	July 8, 2005	411
Maurice, a member of the Kids Next Door is decommissioned. Numbuh 5 is saddened by it, and suggests that they monitor Maurice to make sure the teenagers do not recruit him.
51a	12a	"Operation: L.O.V.E." "Little Operative Very Emotional"	Karen Villarreal	Mo Willems & Mr. Warburton	Matt Peters & Abigail Nesbitt	July 15, 2005	412a
Numbuh 3 stars in a romantic musical as the lead girl, but when Numbuh 4 interrupts the play, it becomes a real war on stage between the DCFDTL and the KND.
51b	12b	"Operation: C.O.U.C.H." "Creepy Otherworld Under Cushiony Heap"	Maurice Joyce	Mo Willems & Mr. Warburton	Kim Arndt & Quack Leard	July 15, 2005	412b
Numbuh 4 tries to battle it out with an empire of toga wearing men in his couch.
52a	13a	"Operation: D.O.D.G.E.B.A.L.L." "Dangerous Old Dude's Game Excellently Beats All Little Losers"	Maurice Joyce	Mo Willems & Mr. Warburton	Guy Moore & Jesse Schmal	July 22, 2005	413a
Numbuh 4 tries to battle against the Dodgeball Wizard for his rank.
52b	13b	"Operation: F.E.R.A.L." "Friends Extract Really Ape-ified Leader"	Karen Villarreal	Mo Willems & Mr. Warburton	Maurice Fontenot & Bob Suarez	July 22, 2005	413b
Numbuh 1 and Sector V are on Rainbow Monkey Island trying to take "The Code" from the Delightful Children.

=== Season 5 (2005–06) ===
No. overall	No. in season	Title	Directed by	Written by	Storyboarded by	Original release date	Prod. code
53	1	"Operation: N.A.U.G.H.T.Y." "Ninnies Almost Undo Greatest Holiday This Year"	Robert Alvarez and Karen Villarreal	Mr. Warburton & Mo Willems	Matt Peters, Kim Arndt, Abigail Nesbitt, & Quack Leard	December 6, 2005	501
The KND try to save Christmas when the DCFDTL frame them for the theft of a gift-creating contraption called the "REINDEER System" created by Santa. Parodies of: Marvel Comics, specifically X-Men and The Fantastic Four along with a Stan Lee-like narrator.
54	2	"Operation: E.L.E.C.T.I.O.N.S." "Enemy Launches Evil Campaign To Inflame Our Noble School"	Robert Alvarez and Maurice Joyce	Mr. Warburton & Andy Rheingold	Kim Arndt, Matt Peters, Jesse Schmal, & Abigal Nesbitt	September 30, 2005	502
The KND are up against more than they bargained for when they try to prevent the DCFDTL for dashing the school elections, especially when the situation involves 8th graders.
55a	3a	"Operation: D.U.C.K.Y." "Dirty Unwashed Captain's Kowardly Yacht"	Gordon Kent	Mr. Warburton & Andy Rheingold	Guy Moore & Quack Leard	September 25, 2005 (Stealth Premiere); October 14, 2005 (Official Premiere)	503a
Tommy embarks on a journey with a cowardly cleanliness-fearing captain in the bath waters.
55b	3b	"Operation: D.I.A.P.E.R." "Drooling Infants Awarded Perilous Emergency Rescue"	Kieran Dowling	Andy Rheingold & Mr. Warburton	Maurice Fontenot & Bob Suarez	September 25, 2005 (Stealth Premiere); October 14, 2005 (Official Premiere)	503b
The KND go to rescue babies from the hospital to protect them from becoming automatic adults. Numbuh 5 thinks the others are insane and tries to bring them back, but the babies themselves have other plans.
56a	4a	"Operation: B.U.L.L.I.E.S." "Big Ugly Lunks Like Intimidating Entrapped Scaredycats"	Maurice Joyce	Andy Rheingold & Mr. Warburton	Kim Arndt & Anthony Davis	October 21, 2005	504a
Numbuhs 2 and 4 try to escape from an island inhabited by bully monsters.
56b	4b	"Operation: F.I.S.H.Y." "Feline Invaders Swarm Headquarters Yearningly"	Robert Alvarez	Mr. Warburton & Andy Rheingold	Matt Peters & Abigail Nesbitt	October 21, 2005	504b
Numbuhs 2 and 4 travel to a certain place in the treehouse to give Numbuh 3's goldfish a proper funeral, while Numbuhs 1 and 5 try to win her a new one from a rigged carnival game.
57a	5a	"Operation: B.R.E.A.K.U.P." "Boys Ruin Everything And Kreate Upset People"	Rick Leon	Andy Rheingold & Mr. Warburton	Maurice Fontenot & Bob Suarez	October 21, 2005	505a
Numbuh 4 uncovers a game in which priceless vases are broken.
57b	5b	"Operation: S.A.F.A.R.I." "Shots Are Fired At Rear Incessantly"	Kieran Dowling	Mr. Warburton & Andy Rheingold	Jesse Schmal & Anthony Davis	October 21, 2005	505b
Numbuh 1 tries to flee from a doctor who wants to cure his moosebumps.
58a	6a	"Operation: V.I.R.U.S." "Very Icky Research Under Sea"	Robert Alvarez	Andy Rheingold & Mr. Warburton	Kim Arndt & Jesse Schmal	January 14, 2006	506a
Numbuh 5 tries to save her sister Cree from a contagious disease, that the KND have made in revenge for creating chicken pox.
58b	6b	"Operation: O.U.T.B.R.E.A.K." "Overflowed Undersea Treehouse Bears Really Extra Awful Kontamination"	Maurice Joyce	Mr. Warburton & Andy Rheingold	Matt Peters & Abigail Nesbitt	January 14, 2006	506b
The KND try to close up a virus being spread in a KND undersea laboratory.
59a	7a	"Operation: C.A.N.Y.O.N." "Clear Area Need You Out Now"	Rick Leon	Andy Rheingold & Mr. Warburton	Maurice Fontenot & Bob Suarez	January 21, 2006	507a
The KND try to make a present for the Global KND anniversary.
59b	7b	"Operation: H.O.L.I.D.A.Y." "Hamsters On Leave In Disastrous Airline Yarn"	Robert Alvarez	Mr. Warburton & Andy Rheingold	Quack Leard & Anthony Davis	January 21, 2006	507b
Numbuhs 2 and 3 try to guide a plane full of hamsters. Meanwhile, Lizzie is jealous of a girl Numbuh 1 is hanging out with, and races over to try to keep Nigel from "dating" her.
60	8	"Operation: C.A.K.E.D.-F.I.V.E." "Centuries After Kalamity Enemy Dessert Found In Void's Emptiness"	Kieran Dowling and Maurice Joyce	Mr. Warburton & Andy Rheingold	Kim Arndt, Matt Peters, Quack Leard, & Abigal Nesbitt	April 14, 2006	508
Once again, a special birthday cake is being made for the Delightful Children from Down the Lane. The KND take a trip to the Alamode where tour guide Numbuh 50 Million B.C. tells them about the 1800s KND operatives who were determined to steal the Annoyingly Cute Triplets Who Lived Upon the Hill's Birthday Cake, a delicious cake made by their mother. However, in their attempt to get the recipe, an ice cream trap was set off, freezing over 5000 KND operatives. It took 10 years to thaw them out, and all were decommissioned since they were technically too old to be KND. All were found except Numbuh 19th Century, the operative sent in to get the recipe and set off the trap, until the current KND recently discovered him. After being thawed out, he's confused by the new modern era, especially with the fact there are now girls in the KND. Guest voice: Josh Peck as Numbuh 50 Million B.C.
61a	9a	"Operation: R.E.C.R.U.I.T." "Really Excitable Child Rookie Undergoes Impossible Test"	Kieran Dowling	Andy Rheingold & Mr. Warburton	Jesse Schmal & Anthony Davis	June 12, 2006	509a
A boy named Bobby tries to get through a training program with flying colors.
61b	9b	"Operation: D.A.D.D.Y." "Dastardly Adult's 'Do Degrades Youngsters"	Robert Alvarez	Mr. Warburton & Andy Rheingold	Maurice Fontenot & Bob Suarez	June 12, 2006	509b
Numbuh 1, Numbuh 83, and Numbuh 84 try to save Numbuh 86's brother, Shaunie, from getting a haircut from his father. Unfortunately, they end up in combat with Shaunie's dad, who is none other than Mr. Boss.
62a	10a	"Operation: C.L.O.W.N." "Curmudgeon's Lackeys Outlaw Wacky Nonsense"	Maurice Joyce	Mr. Warburton & Andy Rheingold	Kim Arndt & Jesse Schmal	July 5, 2006	510a
A clown tries to get Numbuh 2 as he plays many jokes.
62b	10b	"Operation: S.P.A.N.K.E.N.S.T.I.N.E." "Stuffed Puffy Animal Now Kruelly Enacts Nasty Spanking To Investigator's Notable End"	Robert Alvarez	Mr. Warburton & Andy Rheingold	Matt Peters & Abigail Nesbitt	July 5, 2006	510b
Numbuh 3's sister, Mushi, tries to get revenge on Numbuh 2 after being grounded for life for transferring Count Spankulot's power onto her Rainbow Monkey.
63a	11a	"Operation: H.O.T.S.T.U.F.F." "Hands Off Thermostat Says The Upset Father Furiously"	Guy Moore	Mr. Warburton & Andy Rheingold	Quack Leard & Anthony Davis	July 13, 2006	511a
Numbuh 3 is cold, so she turns up the heat even though she is not allowed by her father. It then gets very warm that the KND have to turn down the heating before Numbuh 3's house explodes. Meanwhile, Numbuh 4 watches over Mr. Sanban.
63b	11b	"Operation: M.I.S.S.I.O.N." "Many Incarcerated Scoundrels Secretly Implement Operative's Needs"	Maurice Joyce	Andy Rheingold & Mr. Warburton	Maurice Fontenot & Bob Suarez	July 13, 2006	511b
Numbuh 4 releases Mr. Boss, Stickybeard, Count Spankulot, and Soccer Mom from their cells. At his home he gives them sodas which he tricks them into thinking that they were poisoned, and tells them that he'll give them the antidote if they beat his dad in a bowling tournament.
64a	12a	"Operation: L.I.C.O.R.I.C.E." "Lost Island's Crop Of Red Irreplaceable Candy Endangered"	Maurice Joyce	Mr. Warburton & Andy Rheingold	Matt Peters & Abigail Nesbitt	August 4, 2006 (Stealth Premiere); August 10, 2006 (Official Premiere)	512a
Heinrich comes back, but this time needs to be saved by Numbuh 5 as she recruits Stickybeard and his band of candy pirates to help her rescue Heinrich from Black John Licorice and his pirates.
64b	12b	"Operation: H.O.M.E." "Hardly Ordinary Monkey Estate"	Kieran Dowling	Andy Rheingold & Mr. Warburton	Kim Arndt & Quack Leard	August 10, 2006	512b
Numbuh 3 takes her "My First Rainbow Monkey" to a Rainbow Monkey Retirement Home, but it seems to be more than what it appears to her and Numbuh 5.
65	13	"Operation: I.T." "Indecisive Time"	Guy Moore and Robert Alvarez	Mr. Warburton & Andy Rheingold	Maurice Fontenot, Jesse Schmal, Bob Suarez, & Anthony Davis	August 24, 2006	513
Numbuh 362 gets fed up with the responsibilities that come with being Supreme Leader, so she decides to resign by setting up a requisite game of tag. However, when Numbuh 2 accidentally tags Father, he becomes Supreme Leader. Numbuh 1 and Numbuh 362 then must stop him before he wipes out the entire KND using broccoli. NOTE: This episode takes place before Operation: Z.E.R.O. as it alludes to the Book of the KND (an important artifact in the film).

=== Season 6 (2006–07) ===
No. overall	No. in season	Title	Directed by	Written by	Storyboarded by	Original release date	Prod. code
67	1	"Operation: S.A.F.E.T.Y." "Senator Attacks Foes Endangering Today's Youth"	Karen Villarreal and Kieren Dowling	Mr. Warburton & Andy Rheingold	Kim Arndt, Abigal Nesbitt, & Quack Leard	September 8, 2006	601
When a kid-friendly senator receives a funding of approximately eleventy-billion dollars, he uses it to build an army of Safety-Bots, to make the world a safe place for children. However, the robots grow more and more extreme in their actions, eventually planning to eliminate adults, and cover the Earth in bubble wrap. This episode takes place after the events of the TV movie Operation: Z.E.R.O.
68a	2a	"Operation: E.N.G.L.A.N.D." "Evidently Not Getting Language Annoys Nigel Desperately"	Rick Leon	Mr. Warburton & Andy Rheingold	Jesse Schmal & Anthony Davis	August 2, 2006	602a
When Numbuh 1 is taken to England, someone gives him a book, resulting in Numbuh 1 getting followed by 3 kids.
68b	2b	"Operation: A.W.A.R.D.S." "Attack Will Amazingly Ruin Dinner Show"	Maurice Joyce	Andy Rheingold & Mr. Warburton	Bob Suarez	August 2, 2006	602b
Sector V attempts to sabotage the Villain's Choice Awards.
69a	3a	"Operation: R.E.C.E.S.S." "Recreation Ended 'Cuz Enemies Savor Salad"	Maurice Joyce	Mr. Warburton & Andy Rheingold	Matt Peters & Abigail Nesbitt	September 22, 2006	603a
When salad oil is discovered in the school playground, Numbuh 1 must find a way to save recess, while still keeping a promise to Lizzie.
69b	3b	"Operation: H.A.M.S.T.E.R." "Hungry Archenemy Meowers Strike To Entrap Rodents"	Robert Alvarez	Andy Rheingold & Mr. Warburton	Kim Arndt & Quack Leard	September 22, 2006	603b
While the team is off on their recess-rescuing mission, the hamsters are attacked and captured by the Sinister Felines from Atop the Litterbox, but end up battling the Hamsters Next Door.
70	4	"Operation: W.H.I.T.E.H.O.U.S.E." "What Happens If The Existing Head Of United States Escapes"	Rick Leon and Kieran Dowling	Mr. Warburton & Andy Rheingold	Maurice Fontenot, Jesse Schmal, Bob Suarez, & Damien Lopez	September 29, 2006	604
Numbuh 1 wakes up to discover that he is the president of the United States in an alternate dimension, who is about to sign the Bill of No Rights for Kids.
71a	5a	"Operation: S.P.I.N.A.C.H." "Salad Pushing Invaders Now Attempt Crusade Here"	Maurice Joyce	Andy Rheingold & Mr. Warburton	Kim Arndt & Quack Leard	January 5, 2007	605a
Amerigo Vespinaccio tries to spread spinach throughout the school, and Sector V must stop him.
71b	5b	"Operation: M.E.S.S.A.G.E." "Make Express Shipment Safely Avoiding Gummy Enemies"	Robert Alvarez	Mr. Warburton & Andy Rheingold	Matt Peters & Abigail Nesbitt	January 5, 2007	605b
Numbuh 2 attempts to deliver the fourth grade president's message.
72a	6a	"Operation: B.R.I.D.G.E." "Before Really Incredible Destruction Gotta Evacuate"	Kieran Dowling	Andy Rheingold & Mr. Warburton	Maurice Fontenot & Bob Suarez	January 12, 2007	606a
Numbuh 20,000 and his Squid Squad work with Sector V to destroy the bridge leading into Le Sissie, a store in the mall that sells horrible back-to-school clothes for kids.
72b	6b	"Operation: S.I.X." "Soda Is X-changed"	Maurice Joyce	Alison Wilgus, Andy Rheingold, & Mr. Warburton	Jesse Schmal & Damien Lopez	January 12, 2007	606b
Numbuhs 2, 3, and 6 are tricked and must get a truckload of soda to a girl's birthday party and keep Mr. Fizz and Lieutenant Seltzer from getting the soda.
73	7	"Operation: T.R.I.C.Y.C.L.E." "Tommy's Ride Is Calamity You Can't Let Escape"	Robert Alvarez and Maurice Joyce	Mr. Warburton & Andy Rheingold	Kim Arndt, Matt Peters, Quack Leard, & Abigail Nesbitt	January 19, 2007	607
Tommy loves Numbuh 2's cruddy, old tricycle but gets laughed at when the other kids see him riding it. Using his 2x4 technology expertise, Tommy rebuilds it into the "Best Bike in the Whole World", but the bike turns evil trying to impress Numbuh 2.
74a	8a	"Operation: C.R.I.M.E." "Crayon Renderings Implicate Mostly Everyone"	Kieran Dowling	Alison Wilgus, Andy Rheingold, & Mr. Warburton	Maurice Fontenot & Bob Suarez	January 26, 2007	608a
When Gallagher Elementary students are being arrested by the School Safety Patrol for crimes they are envisioned to commit, including detective Numbuh 2, leaving Numbuh 3 to investigate a psychic member of the School Safety Patrol while trying to finish her social studies homework.
74b	8b	"Operation: P.A.R.T.Y." "Party Animals Rule Teens Yell"	Robert Alvarez	Andy Rheingold & Mr. Warburton	Jesse Schmal & Anthony Davis	January 26, 2007	608b
With Father away at Saratoga Springs for the day on orders from his doctor, the DCFDTL invite Cree and the teenagers to their mansion to plan a new strategy against the Kids Next Door, but instead, the teenagers turn it into a wild house party, leaving the DCFDTL to call Sector V for help.
75a	9a	"Operation: D.O.G.H.O.U.S.E." "Desperate Operative Grabs Homework Outta Unusually Spooky Environment"	Kieran Dowling	Mr. Warburton & Andy Rheingold	Matt Peters & Abigail Nesbitt	August 24, 2007	609a
Numbuh 5 goes into the Haunted Doghouse to get Sector V's cinder block back, but later comes out with different results.
75b	9b	"Operation: P.L.A.N.E.T." "Poor Little Astronauts Never Expected This"	Maurice Joyce	Alison Wilgus, Mr. Warburton, & Andy Rheingold	Kim Arndt & Quack Leard	August 24, 2007	609b
Numbuhs 3 and 4 are launched into space to break the "Ridiculous" space barrier, but blackout in mid-flight and wake up on a world ruled by anthropomorphic, talking Rainbow Monkeys.
76a	10a	"Operation: S.C.I.E.N.C.E." "Sooper Cool Inventions Encourage New Commercial Enterprises"	Robert Alvarez	Mr. Warburton & Andy Rheingold	Maurice Fontenot & Bob Suarez	November 2, 2007	610a
This episode illustrates a day at the annual kids' 2x4 tech science fair. Numbuh 2 is present, shoving his "I Can't Believe It's Not Booger" product down the judges' throats.
76b	10b	"Operation: A.M.I.S.H." "All Machines Illegal Seethes Hoagie"	Kieran Dowling	Andy Rheingold & Mr. Warburton	Jesse Schmal & Anthony Davis	November 2, 2007	610b
Continues from Operation: S.C.I.E.N.C.E.. When a mysterious enemy starts kidnapping KND scientists, Sector V sends Numbuh 2 into hiding at an Amish sector to his extreme dismay.
77	11	"Operation: G.I.R.L.F.R.I.E.N.D." "Guess It's Realistic Lizzie Finally Realizes Its Essentially Nigel's Dysfunctions"	Karen Villarreal and Robert Alvarez	Mr. Warburton & Andy Rheingold	Matt Peters, Kim Arndt, Abigail Nesbitt, & Quack Leard	November 9, 2007	611
Lizzie has always had to compete with the Kids Next Door for Nigel's attention, and she thinks Nigel has found a new girlfriend.
78a	12a	"Operation: C.A.R.A.M.E.L." "Candies Are Really Altering Many Extraordinary Lives"	Karen Villarreal	Alison Wilgus, Andy Rheingold, & Mr. Warburton	Jesse Schmal & Anthony Davis	November 16, 2007	612a
Heinrich uses a ritual involving sacred golden caramels to take away the qualities the Sector V operatives value the most (Numbuh 1's leadership, Numbuh 2's intellect, Numbuh 3's giddiness, Numbuh 4's toughness, and Numbuh 5's coolness). Numbuh 5 eventually teaches Heinrich that he needs to share his candy to revert to his original form; finally learning to do, it is revealed that Heinrich is actually a girl named Henrietta, whose most precious quality, her femininity, was taken away in the ritual many years ago.
78b	12b	"Operation: M.O.O.N." "Moving Out Of Neighbourhood"	Maurice Joyce	Andy Rheingold & Mr. Warburton	Maurice Fontenot & Bob Suarez	November 16, 2007	612b
Adults send Numbuh 4's family to the Moon to colonize it. However, Sector V diverts the colony to Hollywood, where they stage a fake colonization, tricking the Beetles family and the adults at mission control to prevent them from discovering the KND Moonbase.
79	13	"Operation: T.R.E.A.T.Y." "Teens Readily Extend Armistice To Youngsters"	Robert Alvarez and Maurice Joyce	Mr. Warburton & Andy Rheingold	Kim Arndt, Matt Peters, Quack Leard, & Abigail Nesbitt	November 23, 2007	613
The KND and the Teens are about to sign the "You don't mess with us-We don't mess with you" Kid-Teen treaty. It is going to be signed by Numbuh 8000 (KND and the Teens leader), but it turns out to be a trap for the KND, making Numbuhs 1 and 274 set out to prevent it after being falsely convicted by the KND.

== Specials ==
=== Television film (2006) ===
No.	Title	Written by	Storyboards by	Original release date	Prod. code
66	"Operation: Z.E.R.O." "Zero Explanation Reveals Origins"	Story by : Mo Willems, Mr. Warburton, & Alison Wilgus; Screenplay by : Mo Willems	Matt Peters, Kim Arndt, Maurice Fontenot, Quack Leard, Abigail Nesbitt, Bob Suarez, & Jesse Schmal	August 11, 2006	M01
The enemies of the Kids Next Door, led by Benedict Wigglestein (Father), join forces to resurrect the ultimate evil, Grandfather, a tyrant who once ruled the world many years ago when most of the villains were children themselves. However, Grandfather disgraced him that he cannot even try to destroy the KND and the villains were quickly betrayed when they are turned into Senior Citizombies, creatures that are immortal and can transform any human being or any animal (can use the term: Senior Animal Zombies) into one of them and slaves who are forced to make tapioca to refuel Grandfather so he can find and destroy the Book of KND. Once the villains are zombified (but not the teenagers and babies), Grandfather unleashes his wrath on the world, transforming almost all of humanity into old beings, turning the KND tree houses into tapioca factories, and the Kids Next Door including the Gallagher Elementary School exclusive KND Operatives rallies in defense, but are quickly overrun and zombified. Numbuh 1 is the only surviving KND operative to locate the KND's only hope for salvation, the legendary hero Numbuh 0 who turned out to be Montgomery Uno, Numbuh 1's father. In the process, Numbuh 1 discovers shocking information about the KND, Father and the Delightful Children from Down the Lane, and even his own family. Realizing that he is the only one standing, he makes a daring task to find Numbuh 0 and to save the world. Guest voice: Neil Ross as Grandfather.: Note: This is a feature-length made-for-television movie, which take place between the events of the fifth and sixth seasons of the series.

=== Crossover special (2007) ===
No.	Title	Directed by	Created by	Storyboards by	Original release date	Prod. code
80	"The Grim Adventures of the KND"	Robert Alvarez and Juli Hashiguchi	Maxwell Warburton (Mr. Warburton) and Mr. Atoms (Maxwell Atoms)	Maurice Fontenot, Jesse Schmal, Alex Almaguer, and Scott "Diggs" Underwood	November 11, 2007	SP01
While Billy's dad is underwear shopping, Billy, wearing his dad's lucky pants, accidentally rips them with Grim's scythe. Billy opens the door to his house suspecting the Powerpuff Girls, but the portal leads to the Sector V operatives instead. Numbuh 1 disguises as Billy while Billy is taken back to the Deep Sea Lab. Mandy, arriving at Billy's house knowing Numbuh 1 is not Billy, tortures Numbuh 1 into revealing the truth. Meanwhile, the Delightful Children from Down the Lane and Billy accidentally fuse with the scythe's power to create the Delightful Reaper. Mandy takes over the KND by fooling Numbuh 362 along with the entire KND, but Numbuh 5, knowing she is not Numbuh 1, is taken to the med lab. The Delightful Reaper assimilates nearly all of Endsville (including Numbuh 2) and grows more powerful and gigantic. Numbuh 1 and Grim try to get the KND to see the truth, but are imprisoned. Numbuh 5 escapes and finds Numbuh 1 and Grim. Grim and Numbuh 1 fuse with the Bone of Barnacles and become the Skeleton Samurai. Mandy, in her M.A.N.D.R.O.B.O.T. (Monkeys And Nice Dogs Relax On Bellies Of Turtles), fights the Delightful Reaper, and so does the Skeleton Samurai, but they cannot defeat it. Grim finds out that the pants belong to Billy's dad (which are shown to be immune to lasers, supernatural energies and mustard). Mandy is their only hope to defeat the Reaper, but instead she fuses with the Reaper. Billy's dad takes off the pants, and the Samurai Skeleton destroys the Delightful Reaper, freeing all of the assimilated children inside it. Mandy becomes furious with Numbuh 1 and Grim, and escapes to vow revenge. Numbuh 1 is mistaken to be Billy by Billy's dad, who punishes him for ruining his lucky pants, as Billy, on the other hand, disguises as Numbuh 1, causing the KND to throw various objects at him in response to prevent what happened that day.

=== Television film/Series finale (2008) ===
No.	Title	Directed by	Written by	Storyboards by	Original release date	Prod. code
81	"Operation: I.N.T.E.R.V.I.E.W.S." "It's Now The Extra Really Very Interesting End Wrap-Up Story"	Robert Alvarez, Maurice Joyce, and Karen Villarreal	Mr. Warburton & Andy Rheingold	Guy Moore, Maurice Fontenot, Jesse Schmal, Anthony Davis, Bob Suarez, & Abigail Nesbitt	January 21, 2008	614/615
Numbuhs 2–5 as adults are recommissioned by an unnamed, unseen interviewer and tell him what happened to Numbuh 1 on their final mission. They are told by the interviewer that the effects of decommissioning have been temporarily reversed so they could be interviewed regarding their final mission, in which Sector V and the younger Sector W compete in a scavenger hunt, alongside most of the series' characters, to win the Delightful Children's birthday cake. Though behind for most of the hunt, Sector V must aid Sector W when they go too far and try to steal Father's pipe. Numbuh 1 is then introduced to the secret organization behind the Splinter Cell: the Galactic KND, an intergalactic KND that battles adulthood on multiple planets, and that he has been selected to become the first operative from Earth. He is able to say goodbye to both his parents and to Sector V. At the end of the events of the film, it is revealed that after Numbuh 5 eventually resigns as the leader of Sector V once again, she and Numbuh 2 get married; Numbuhs 3 and 4 also get married. The interviewer is revealed to be Father in disguise. The series ends with Numbuh 5 pulling out a KND communicator, hinting that either she or the entire sector are all still KND operatives. She tells Numbuh 1 that they will meet him back on the Moonbase, revealing that they lied to Father about Numbuh 1 never being able to come back.: Notes: The events of this special take place after the final episode of the series.
