= The Off-Beats =

- Title card
- Genre: Comedy
- Created by: Mo Willems
- Written by: Mo Willems; Josh Selig
- Directed by: Mo Willems
- Voices of: Mischa Barton; Mo Willems; Mark Wagner; Jimmy McQuaid; Kathleen Fasalino; Dylan Roberts; Trisha Hedgecock; Tara Ketterer; Kevin Seal
- Narrated by: Mo Willems (opening only)
- Composer: William Anderson
- Country of origin: United States
- Original language: English
- No. of seasons: 2
- No. of episodes: 14

Production
- Executive producers: Mo Willems; Mary Harrington
- Producer: Mo Willems
- Running time: 2-4 minutes
- Production companies: Curious Pictures; Nickelodeon Productions

Original release
- Network: Nickelodeon
- Release: November 29, 1996 – January 16, 1998

Related
- KaBlam! Sheep in the Big City; Codename: Kids Next Door; Team Umizoomi; Little Einsteins

The Off-Beats is an American slapstick comedy animated television series that was created by Mo Willems. The first episodes were produced as standalone short animated films for Nickelodeon; but after the series was nominated for a CableACE Award, more segments were produced for KaBlam!. The series was initially called The Misfits, but Nickelodeon had Willems change the series' title (and re-animate the intro) at the last moment before its television debut. The series was the first to end on KaBlam! after Willems moved to Cartoon Network to create Sheep in the Big City, it too was cancelled after two years on the air.

The show features a distinct art style, with flat, dry colors. The animation is similar to that of UPA and Hanna-Barbera cartoons. The series itself (especially in story and concept) pays homage to the classic Peanuts TV specials, especially since the majority of the voice cast are child actors. Each episode is composed with a jazz genre, occasionally includes big band music, but mostly including a combination of a piano, drums and a double bass. Each segment was two to four minutes in length. Most of the soundtracks in the shorts are similar to The Pink Panther cartoon shorts.

== Theme song ==
The opening introduction to the shorts always consisted of a short poem, spoken by Grubby Groo (voiced by Mo Willems). The introduction to the original pre-Kablam shorts used a different version. The Valentine's Day special used a new version of the theme song specifically for the special.

== Characters ==
=== The Off-Beats ===
Betty Anne Bongo - Betty Anne is the realistically thinking "leader" of the group, but sometimes not very bright. She can usually be found playing her bongo set. She often sings her own short theme song: "My name is Betty Anne Bongo, I sing this little song-O, I sing it all day long-O!" along with rapidly banging on her bongos (although on one occasion, she sings it without the help of her bongos). Betty is originally against puppy love as she does not see the point of it, since friendship is another option. She then develops a crush on Brad Groo. She is voiced by Mischa Barton.

Tommy - Tommy loves his plaid coat, so much so that in one episode it is the basis for the plot when it is sent to the cleaners and he goes temporarily insane. On some occasions, he breaks his calm nature and loses his temper, causing him to shout with words coming out of his mouth, usually startling his friends and himself. Betty is able to copy Tommy's movements and yelling voice at ease, and Repunzil is able to do the same as shown in the Valentine's Day special. His catchphrase is "Let me just say..." when confronting the Populars, accompanied by his yelling (voiced by Kevin Seal). He also spends most of his time being outside instead of being inside, as in a literal outsider. He seems to love fishing as he did in the pilot and "The Statistic". Tommy is voiced by Mark Wagner.

Repunzil - Repunzil is the youngest girl in the group and can be quite naive. She is known for her floor-length long hair (named after the princess Rapunzel). She can be dim-witted at times because of her young age and does not know how to tie her shoes. Repunzil is an animal lover; she owns a lot of animals (and a toaster) in the "Sweepstakes" episode and sets up September with a duck and an elephant as a crush in the Valentine's Day special. In the same special she has a crush on Tommy and tries to give him a box of chocolates on Valentine's Day before eating it. She gets angry at her mother for doing her hair in a silly way. She tends to say: "Sometimes I hate my mom". She is voiced by Trisha Hedgecock.

August - August is the most technologically inclined brain of the Off-Beats, but many of his gadgets fail or backfire unexpectedly. While some episodes imply that August makes his gadgets himself, others imply that he purchases them. He has an interest in impressing The Populars and gaining their respect. August is the only character to appear at least once in every episode. He may have a crush on Tina since he tries to get her to be his valentine with an invention he made, which results in him being thrown into the punchbowl at the party. He is voiced by Dylan Roberts.

September - August's sarcastic talking dog is usually ambivalent to most situations and plot-lines. Even so, he does enjoy the company of the Off-Beats. September is paid to like August, as shown in one episode, and has a contract that permits him to have at least one day off. Despite his natural intelligence, he is refused to open a simple can of dog food. He is able to play the bagpipes, as shown in the last short. He once fell in love with a falling cat named February, which his dog friends found strange. Eventually, a dog war broke out and he and his girlfriend had to flee Paris before the dog invasion. Although she said she would be at the train station, she never showed. They finally reunited when February fell onto September's turntable during the dance, making September happy again. He is voiced by the series' creator, Mo Willems.

Grubby Groo - The beatnik-looking adult friend of the Off-Beats, and the only one who realizes what big jerks the Populars are, as shown in the pilot and "The Sprain". He works in Cafe Ad Hoc, which is famous for its special Junkyard Sundae. He plays golf, as shown in the last short. He has a nephew named Brad (voiced by Bradley Glenn), on whom Betty Anne has a crush. Brad helps him set up the Valentine's Day dance. Grubby Groo was originally created for a short Willems made for Sesame Street in 1993. He is voiced by creator Mo Willems.

=== The Populars ===
The Populars are a group of six mean kids, usually seen led by Tina, traveling in a huge nose-in-the-air clump. Whenever they come across an adult, they all put on fraudulent smiles and pretend to be nice. Grubby Groo knows that they are just hiding their evilness. The Populars do not just walk together, but sleep and live together as well. Each individual is allowed a bathroom break, which enables separation of the group to commence. This is how Beth is able to talk to Tommy without getting into trouble.

The Populars seem to be the inspiration for the antagonists, the Delightful Children from Down The Lane, in Codename: Kids Next Door, a cartoon on which Mo Willems has also worked.

Tina – The principal antagonist of the series. Tina is the mean-spirited leader of the Populars. If the Off-Beats ever show it, she is there to squash any self-esteem. Despite her spoiled personality and bad attitude, she seems to be intelligent, as she is curious about Betty Anne's inability to react to her negative comments. Some of her insults make little (if any) sense or are deemed too childish; for example, in one episode she calls paddleball "Stupid" and says that Betty Anne will get "bumpkis" once Repunzil wins the Sweepstakes. She is something of a stereotypical "school diva". Voiced by Kathleen Fasolino.

Beth - Tina's best friend and sidekick in the group. It is her job to warn the Populars whenever a grown-up is near; she usually shouts "Adult!" Then the Populars begin their phony "nice" act. Once she and Tommy fell in love with each other, and they had to keep it secret. Voiced by Tara Ketterer.

Billy - A boy who wears a red beanie cap. A running gag in the series usually involves him saying something that will upset Tina, and then the Populars throw him forward into the distance, causing him to crash into something (most likely a trash can given the sound effects) and scream. Voiced by Jimmy McQuaid.

The remaining Populars are voiced by Tim Duffy (Paul), Keith Franklin (Gordon), and John Morgan (Virgil).

== Segments ==
=== Standalone short films: 1995 ===
These were initially aired under their original title The Misfits, but later changed to The Off-Beats. The animation was choppier and the character's voices are younger. Also, the bean-shaped logo for The Off-Beats was green instead of pink and a Nickelodeon arrow logo with presents byline appeared on the logo. However, the Misfits logo had the pink bean-shaped logo, as well as the "Nickelodeon presents" arrow logo. These episodes were made to promote the premiere of Kablam. The episodes are on NickSplat's YouTube channel for now. They are also seen on the Rugrats “Tommy Troubles” VHS release and aired as an intermission between two Nickelodeon programmings.

- "My Dog Can Talk": In an effort to befriend the Populars, August tells them that his dog, September, is able to talk. When he says "bow", the Populars laugh, but then he corrects the Populars and commands them to bow down to him, shocking them all.
- "Your Shoe's Untied": The Populars play the old "your shoe's untied" prank on the Off-Beats, but it only works on Repunzil, who then asks Grubby Groo to tie her shoes for her.
- "The Twig": Betty Anne finds a twig and tries to save it with the "help" of Repunzil. It does not work and they ask Tommy for advice. He suggests they leave it alone (his yelling also killed the twig even more) and then August and September use it for a game of fetch (which is played the other way around).

=== Season 1: 1996-1997 ===
The first season features The Off-Beats pink logo without the Nickelodeon arrow logo.

- "The Robodog": Because September takes a day off from being August's dog, he orders a new robotic dog, which "plays 4-ever." This soon bores August, and September begins to get jealous. So September obtains a Roboboy, which also "plays 4-ever," which causes the Robodog to leave August and befriend the Roboboy instead.
- "Too Much Attention for September": August takes a ride in his new invention, the heli-cart, and September refuses to go with him. As he does this, everyone tries to talk with him or play with him, driving him insane. (Solely by Steven Dovas.)
- "Betty Anne's Glasses": When Betty Anne Bongo loses her glasses after playing her bongos, the Populars find them and Tina puts them on to mimic her. They hide them from the Off-Beats, who are unaware of this, and then September figures it out and devises a plan to get them back. (Solely by Karen Villarreal.)

=== Season 2: 1997-1998 ===
- "Tommy's Coat": When Tommy has his coat sent to be dry-cleaned, he begins to slowly go insane because he misses his prized possession. Betty Anne tries to help him. He even hallucinates the Populars having the same color pattern as the coat! (Solely by Karen Villarreal.)
- "The Suave-O-Matic 5000": August wants to be friends with the Populars, so he uses his Suave-O-Matic, which results in him getting taller and cooler (complete with a deeper voice). The Populars befriend the new August, and all goes well until he decides to play paddleball, causing the Suave-O-Matic to go haywire and explode. (Solely by Karen Villarreal.)
- "Tommy's Song": Tommy hears a song on the radio and gets it stuck in his head, and he can not stop singing it, so Betty Anne tries to help him out. He is even able to scare away the Populars with his song as it ends up stuck in their heads. Once they finally helped him, Repunzil arrives with the song stuck in her head, which gets to the rest of the Off-Beats as well. (Solely by Frank Gresham.)
- "Repunzil and the Sweepstakes": Repunzil gets an entry form in the mail for sweepstakes with a million-dollar prize. She believes she is going to win, and the Populars befriend her in hopes she will buy stuff for them. (Solely by Steven Dovas.)
- "The Sprain": Betty Anne sprains her wrist while playing her bongoes, and despite all the attention she is getting, she is depressed because she cannot play her bongoes. The Populars are jealous of the huge Junkyard Sundae Grubby Groo makes for her, and try to fake being injured so they can also get a sundae. (Duetly by Ron Crawford and John Paratore.)
- "Paddleball Record": When August is too busy trying to break a paddleball record, September goes off to party but realizes he cannot open his can of dog food, so he gets incredibly hungry, but nobody else notices. Thankfully, August sees this and feeds his dog in time, at the cost of his paddleball record. (Solely by Steven Dovas.)
- "The Statistic": When the gang hears from September about the probability that a person in a group of four would be conked on the head by something falling from the sky, Tommy tries to leave the group because he seems to be the target. (Note: This episode features more adults, backgrounds, children and locations than any other episode, although the Valentines has the same. This was also the last episode produced, and the Off-Beats was taken off of the KaBlam! roster after Season 2, but had its Valentine's Day special debut in 1999.)

=== Specials: 1999 ===
- An Off-Beats Valentine's: This half-hour TV special features everyone getting ready for Valentine's Day, and Tommy of the Off-Beats and Beth of the Populars develop a crush on each other. September also reminisces about a female cat named February he was in love with. Repunzil tries to get September a new crush, and tries to give an escaping Tommy a valentine gift, and August tries to figure out how to get a girlfriend without the use of technology. (Animated by the sixpence.)

Note: In this episode, Tommy is seen without his hat for the only time in the series, revealing that he is bald. This episode reveals September had a girlfriend that is explained in a backstory. This episode also proves that the Populars do in fact sleep and live together, and each individual member is allowed a bathroom break. Repunzil is shown to yell like Tommy. She is the second Off-Beat to do so; the first was Betty Anne. This was also the very last episode produced by Mo Willems, who moved to the Cartoon Network to create Sheep in the Big City.

Production notes: As the original voiceover child actors and animators returned, everyone was set for the production as cited in a press release: "We've had the same team of independent animators and voiceover kids for the past four years, so everyone really understood their characters and was ready to jam". It was produced in 1998 and aired on Nickelodeon in 1999 during the Nickel-O-Zone era rather than only on KaBlam!. This is the first 30-minute episode and the only holiday special. Willems uploaded the music score for the cartoon's theme song, the flashback of September's girlfriend's story, and the sad valentine song about September played at the dance at a low volume due to the horrific lyrics. The script for the full episode was also uploaded and then removed. Considered to be lost, the episode was finally uploaded to YouTube.
