= Knuffle Bunny =

2004 children's picture book by Mo Willems

Knuffle Bunny: A Cautionary Tale
- Front cover, designed by Mo Willems
- Author: Mo Willems
- Illustrator: Mo Willems
- Cover artist: Willems
- Language: English
- Series: Knuffle Bunny Series
- Subject: Families, Neighborhoods, Growing up, First words
- Genre: children's books picture books
- Publisher: Hyperion Books, New York
- Publication date: October 2, 2004
- Publication place: United States
- Media type: Hardcover
- Pages: 36
- ISBN: 978-0-7868-1870-9
- OCLC: 55606208
- Dewey Decimal: [E] 22
- LC Class: PZ7.W65535 Knu 2004
- Preceded by: N/A
- Followed by: Knuffle Bunny Too

Knuffle Bunny: A Cautionary Tale (from Dutch knuffel, pronounced k-nuffle) is a classic children's picture book written and illustrated by Mo Willems. Released by Hyperion Books in 2004, Knuffle Bunny received the 2005 Caldecott Honor. The story spawned an animated short film and a musical play, as well as two sequel books. The sequels have sold more than 750,000 copies. The series' protagonist, Trixie, is named after Willems' real-life daughter.

== Plot ==
A young girl named Trixie and her father visit the laundromat. However, on the return home, Trixie realizes that her stuffed rabbit, Knuffle Bunny, has been left behind. Because she cannot talk yet, Trixie cannot tell her father why she is upset, and throws a tantrum despite him imploring her to remain calm. When they return home, Trixie's mother immediately realizes that Knuffle Bunny is missing. The three run back to the laundromat, and after several tries, Trixie's father finds the toy among the wet laundry. Upon having her beloved toy returned, Trixie exuberantly exclaims, "Knuffle Bunny!" — her first words.

== Reception ==
Kirkus Reviews wrote, "The natural audience for this offering is a little older than its main character: they will easily identify with Trixie’s grief and at the same time feel superior to her hapless parent—and rejoice wholeheartedly at the happy reunion." Publishers Weekly asserted that Willems "creates an entertaining story for parents and children alike." and "once again demonstrates his keen insight with a story both witty and wise." Common Sense Media described it as "a charming book for all ages," and Inis magazine of Children's Books Ireland wrote, "Mo Willems’s book has a unique style that draws you in."

== In other media ==
The story's audio version, narrated by Mo, Cheryl, and Trixie Willems, received the 2007 Audie Award for Children's Titles for Ages up to 8. It also spawned an animated short, which won the Carnegie Medal for Excellence in Children's Video in 2007. The book was also adapted into a musical, Knuffle Bunny: A Cautionary Musical, by Willems, Michael Silversher, and Deborah Wicks La Puma. It toured with the Kennedy Center to cities all across the United States.

A Knuffle Bunny stuffed toy was released by the Yottoy Productions.

In 2019, the Park Slope branch of the Brooklyn Public Library unveiled a statue of Knuffle Bunny. Park Slope was chosen because it is the setting of the books and was the home of the author at the time of their writing.

The story is read on an episode of the PBS children's show Between the Lions.

== Sequels ==
In August 2007, a sequel, Knuffle Bunny Too: A Case of Mistaken Identity was published. The sequel picks up with the original book's main character, Trixie, three years later. In September 2010, Knuffle Bunny Free: An Unexpected Diversion was released, completing the trilogy. The final installment features an epilogue in which Willems sends a poignant message to his real daughter, Trixie, wishing her well in her life as an adult.
