= Time to Pee! =

2003 picture book about toilet training

- Front cover, designed by Mo Willems
- Author: Mo Willems
- Cover artist: Willems
- Language: English
- Subject: Toilet training
- Genre: children's books picture books
- Publisher: Hyperion Books, New York
- Publication date: 2003
- Publication place: United States
- Pages: 40
- ISBN: 978-0-7868-1868-6
- OCLC: 51264811
- Dewey Decimal: 649/.62 21
- LC Class: HQ770.5 .W56 2003

Time to Pee! is a children's picture book written and illustrated by Mo Willems. Published in 2003 by Hyperion Books, it is a book about toilet training. It also includes a progress chart and a page of motivational stickers. The book's instructions are presented by a group of mice that are shown toting signs and banners. Willems joked in an interview, "My basic theory was that kids will never listen to adults, but they will listen to an infestation of mice."

A sequel, Time to Say "Please"!, focusing on manners, was released in 2005.

== Reception ==
The book was generally well received by critics. Horn Book Magazine's Kitty Flynn remarked that "the book was perfectly attuned to preschoolers' sensibilities and funny bones," while Kris Jensen of the Grand Forks Herald called it "an adorable little book, just right . . . for both the Rosemond and Brazelton camps". Janis Campbell of the Detroit Free Press described it as "a funny and straightforward guide", having added, "[P]ublishers have recognized this milestone and you might as well have handled it with humor". The book was even reviewed by Entertainment Weekly, who remarked, "Surely this book would whiz straight to the top."

== Other editions ==
In addition to a hardcover edition, Time to Pee! is also available as a board book edition, released in March 2020.

== See also ==
- Toilet training
- What's Your Poo Telling You?
