= Mo Willems =

American children's books illustrator and writer (born 1968)

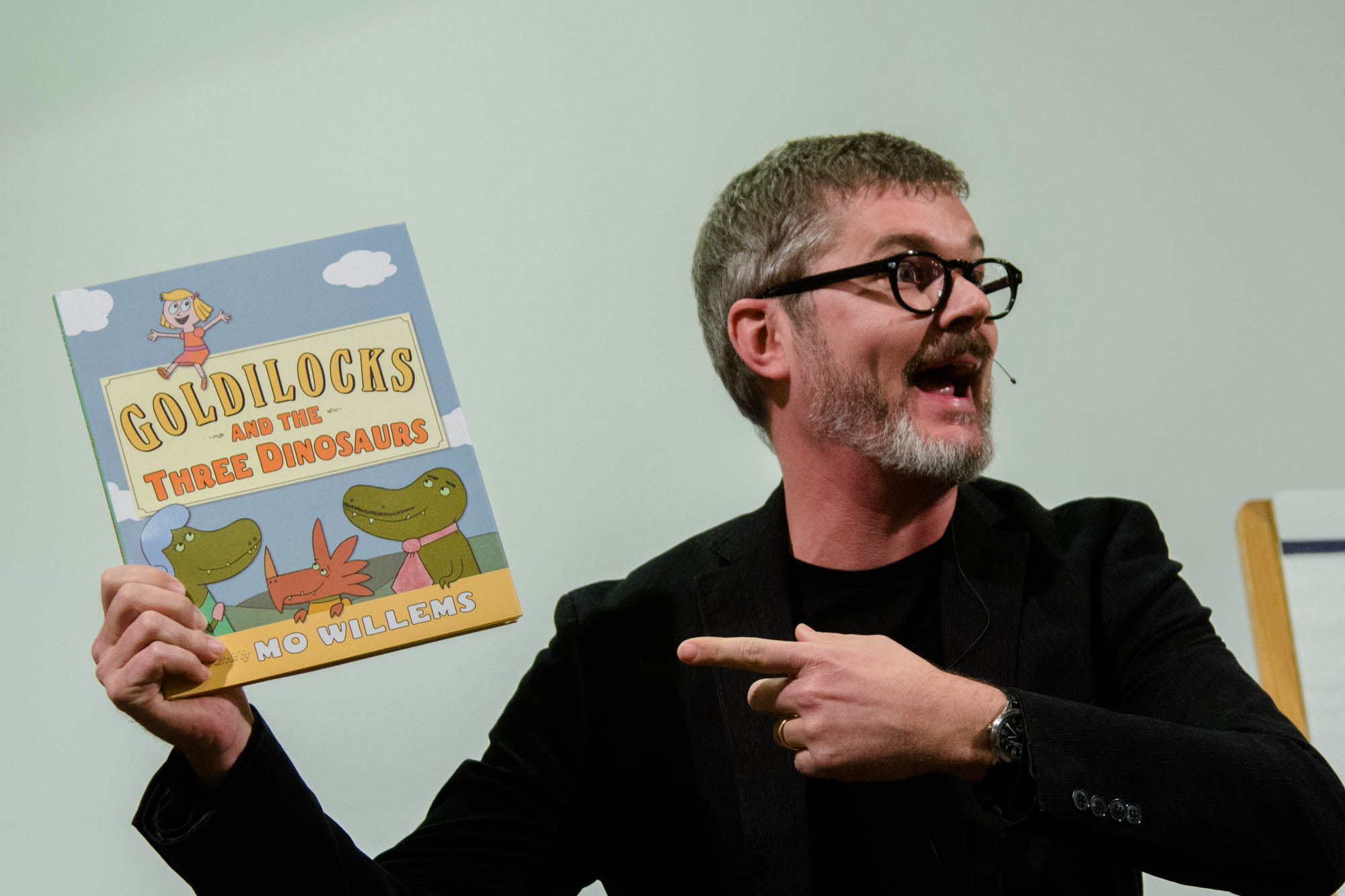
- Willems at the Mazza Museum Fall 2012 Conference
- Born: Maurice Charles Willems; February 11, 1968 (age 58); Des Plaines, Illinois, U.S.
- Education: New York University (BFA)
- Occupations: Author, illustrator, animator, voice actor
- Spouse: Cheryl Camp (m. 1997)
- Children: 1
- Writing career
- Years active: 1990–present
- Website: hiddenpigeoncompany.com

Maurice Charles Willems (born February 11, 1968) is an American writer, animator, voice actor, and children's book author. His work includes creating the animated television series Sheep in the Big City for Cartoon Network, working on Sesame Street and The Off-Beats, and creating the children's book Knuffle Bunny and the children's book series Elephant & Piggie.

Willems was born in the Chicago suburb of Des Plaines, Illinois and was raised in New Orleans, where he graduated from Trinity Episcopal School and the Isidore Newman School. He graduated cum laude from New York University's Tisch School of the Arts.

Three of Willems's books have been awarded a Caldecott Honor, for Don't Let the Pigeon Drive the Bus!, Knuffle Bunny: A Cautionary Tale, and Knuffle Bunny Too: A Case of Mistaken Identity. The third book also won the Indies Choice Book Award for Children's Illustrated Book.

== Early life ==
Willems's parents were from the Netherlands and grew up there during World War II. His mother was a corporate attorney and an honorary consul to the Dutch Embassy. His father was from Nijmegen. When Willems was about three years of age, he took interest in cartoon artwork, drawing and creating his own characters. Willems enjoyed writing stories about his characters to share with others. However, he was disappointed when adults would praise his work politely, as he wanted feedback on the quality of his stories. To fix this dilemma, Willems wrote comedic stories, following the notion that even polite adults would not fake a laugh. When adults laughed, Willems assumed his story was good, and if the adults only gave polite comments, Willems assumed his story needed improvement.

After graduating from New York University's Tisch School of Arts, Willems spent a year traveling around the world drawing a cartoon every day, all of which have been published in the book You Can Never Find a Rickshaw When it Monsoons.

== Career ==
Returning to New York, he started his career as a writer and animator for Sesame Street, where he earned six Emmy Awards for writing during his tenure from 1993 to January 2002. The segments he wrote and animated for the show included a series of short segments featuring the recurring character Susie Kabloozie, and her pet cat, Feff. During this period he also performed stand-up comedy in NYC and recorded essays for BBC Radio along with making a promo for Cartoon Network and animating the opening for a show on Nickelodeon. He later created two animated television series: The Off-Beats for Nickelodeon and Sheep in the Big City for Cartoon Network. Sheep in the Big City was a success with the critics but ultimately failed to attract sufficient viewership and was canceled after two seasons. Willems later worked as head writer on the first four seasons of Codename: Kids Next Door, created by one of his colleagues from Sheep, Tom Warburton. He left the show to pursue his writing career.

Since 2003, Willems has authored numerous books for young children, many of which have garnered significant critical acclaim. The New York Times Book Review referred to Willems as "the biggest new talent to emerge thus far in the 00's" — and to his pigeon character as "one of this decade's contributions to the pantheon of great picture book characters." He also creates the Elephant and Piggie books, an early reader series about a friendly elephant and pig. In 2010, Willems introduced a new series of books featuring Cat the Cat, also aimed at early readers.

Willems' books have been translated into around 25 languages, spawned animated shorts that have twice been awarded the Carnegie Medal (Knuffle Bunny, 2007, and Don't Let the Pigeon Drive the Bus, 2010), and been developed into theatrical musical productions. His illustrations, wire sculpture, and carved ceramics have been exhibited in galleries and museums across the nation. He made several appearances on NPR's All Things Considered as the show's "radio cartoonist" in 2008.

In 2019, Willems was named the Kennedy Center's first education artist-in-residence. In 2020, the Center sponsored a series of virtual lunch doodles with Mo Willems as a way of keeping children entertained during the COVID-19 pandemic.

== Awards ==
In 2005, his book Leonardo, the Terrible Monster was named a Time Magazine Best Children's Book; it was also awarded a Book Sense Book of the Year Honor Book in 2006.

Two animated versions of his books were awarded Carnegie Medals (Knuffle Bunny: A Cautionary Tale and Don't Let the Pigeon Drive the Bus!)

Elephant & Piggie books won two Theodor Seuss Geisel Medals, for There Is a Bird on Your Head! and Are You Ready to Play Outside?, and five Geisel Honors, for We Are in a Book!, I Broke My Trunk!, Let's Go for a Drive!, A Big Guy Took My Ball!, and Waiting Is Not Easy! His 2009 I Love My New Toy! earned him a Golden Kite Award.

Willems won the Daytime Emmy Award for Outstanding Writing For A Children's Series six times for his work on Sesame Street between 1995 and 2001.

In 2019, Willems was named the Best of Brooklyn, during the Brooklyn Book Festival.

In 2020, Willems recorded an audio book, The Pigeon HAS to Go to School!, for which he was nominated for the Audie Award for Young Listeners. The same book had Willems on the NY Times Bestseller list for 11 weeks running.

In 2026, Willems was announced as the recipient of the Chicago Public Library Foundation's Carl Sandburg Literary Award.

== Personal life ==
He married Cheryl Camp in Brooklyn, New York, in 1997. They reside in Northampton, Massachusetts.

== Bibliography ==
Willems has worked on a number of books on his own, as well as submitting work for other compilations.

=== As author ===
- Pigeon series
  - Don't Let the Pigeon Drive the Bus! (2003) — Caldecott Honor (2004), Charlotte Zolotow Commendation
  - The Pigeon Finds a Hot Dog! (2004)
  - The Pigeon Loves Things That Go! (2005)
  - The Pigeon Has Feelings, Too! (2005)
  - Don't Let the Pigeon Stay Up Late! (2006)
  - The Pigeon Wants a Puppy! (2008)
  - The Duckling Gets a Cookie!? (2012) — Irma Black Honor (2013)
  - Don't Let the Pigeon Finish This Activity Book! (2012)
  - The Pigeon Needs a Bath! (2014)
  - The Pigeon HAS to Go to School! (2019)
  - The Pigeon Will Ride the Roller Coaster! (2022)
  - Be The Bus: The Lost & Profound Wisdom of The Pigeon (2023)
  - Don't Let The Pigeon Drive the Sleigh! (2023)
  - Will the Pigeon Graduate? (2025)
  - The Pigeon Won't Count to 10! (2025)
  - The Pigeon Won't Say the Abcs! (2026)
  - It's My Bird-Day! (2026)
  - The Pigeon WON'T Play with Shapes! (2026)
  - The Pigeon WON'T Pick a Color! (2026)
  - The Pigeon Wants to Drive! (2026)
- Knuffle Bunny series
  - Knuffle Bunny: A Cautionary Tale (2004) — Caldecott Honor (2005), Charlotte Zolotow Honor 2005
  - Knuffle Bunny Too: A Case of Mistaken Identity (2007) — Caldecott Honor (2008)
  - Knuffle Bunny Free: An Unexpected Diversion (2010)
- Edwina, the Dinosaur Who Didn't Know She Was Extinct (2006)
- Leonardo, the Terrible Monster (2005) — Charlotte Zolotow Commendation
- Time to Pee! (2003)
- Time to Say "Please"! (2005)
- You Can Never Find a Rickshaw When It Monsoons (2006)
- Elephant & Piggie series
  - Today I Will Fly! (2007)
  - My Friend is Sad (2007)
  - I Am Invited to a Party! (2007)
  - There Is a Bird on Your Head! (2007) — Theodor Seuss Geisel Medal (2008)
  - I Love My New Toy! (2008)
  - I Will Surprise My Friend! (2008)
  - Are You Ready to Play Outside? (2008) — Theodor Seuss Geisel Medal (2009)
  - Watch Me Throw the Ball! (2009)
  - Elephants Cannot Dance! (2009)
  - Pigs Make Me Sneeze! (2009)
  - I Am Going! (2010)
  - Can I Play Too? (2010)
  - We Are in a Book! (2010) — Theodor Seuss Geisel Honor (2011)
  - I Broke My Trunk! (2011) — Theodor Seuss Geisel Honor (2012)
  - Should I Share My Ice Cream? (2011)
  - Happy Pig Day! (2011)
  - Listen to My Trumpet! (2012)
  - Let's Go for a Drive! (2012) — Theodor Seuss Geisel Honor (2013)
  - A Big Guy Took My Ball! (2013) — Theodor Seuss Geisel Honor (2014)
  - I'm a Frog! (2013)
  - My New Friend Is So Fun! (2014)
  - Waiting Is Not Easy! (2014) — Theodor Seuss Geisel Honor (2015)
  - I Will Take a Nap! (2015)
  - I Really Like Slop! (2015)
  - The Thank You Book (2016)
- Elephant and Piggie Presents series (written by other authors)
  - We Are Growing! (2016)
  - The Cookie Fiasco (2016)
  - The Good for Nothing Button (2017)
  - It's Shoe Time! (2017)
  - The Itchy Book! (2018)
  - Harold & Hog Pretend for Real! (2019)
  - What About Worms?! (2020)
  - I'm On It! (2021)
  - It's A Sign! (2022)
- Naked Mole Rat Gets Dressed (2009)
- Big Frog Can't Fit In: A Pop-Out Book (2009)
- Goldilocks and the Three Dinosaurs (2012) — Irma Black Honor (2013)
- That is NOT a Good Idea! (2013) — Irma Black Medal (2014)
- Don't Pigeonhole Me! (2013)
- Hooray for Amanda and Her Alligator! (2011)
- Cat the Cat series
  - Cat the Cat, Who Is That? (2010)
  - Let's Say Hi to Friends Who Fly (2010)
  - What's Your Sound, Hound the Hound? (2010)
  - Time to Sleep, Sheep the Sheep! (2010)
- City Dog, Country Frog (2010) — Charlotte Zolotow Honor
- The Story of Diva and Flea (2015), illustrated by Tony DiTerlizzi
- Nanette's Baguette (2016)
- Sam, the Most Scaredy-Cat Kid in the Whole World (2017)
- Welcome (2017)
- A Busy Creature's Day Eating (2018)
- Unlimited Squirrels series
  - I Lost My Tooth! (2018)
  - Who is the Mystery Reader? (2019)
  - I Want to Sleep Under the Stars! (2020)
  - Guess What!? (2021)
  - The FRUSTRATING Book! (2022)
- Because (2019), illustrated by Amber Ren
- Opposites Abstract (2021)
- Are You Big? (2024)
- Are You Small? (2024)
- Me and Other Bunnies (2025)
- Snake & Bat series
  - What Will We Find in This Box? (2026)

=== As animator ===
- The Man Who Yelled (1990; student film)
- Ira Sleeps Over (animator) (1991)
- A Child's Garden of Verses (layout) (1992)
- Iddy Biddy Beat Boy (director) (1993)
- Cartoon Network "Closedown" (design) (1993)
- Beavis and Butt-Head (layout and design) (1993–1994)
- Sesame Street (various shorts, including Suzie Kabloozie and I'm an Octopus) (1993–1999)
- Another Bad Day for Philip Jenkins (1994)
- Going, Going, Almost Gone! Animals in Danger (animator) (1995)
- Crazy Owen (promo for Cartoon Network) (1995)
- Nickelodeon "Rhino ID" (design) (1996)
- The Off-Beats (creator) (1996–1998)
- Short Films by Short People (show open) (1997)
- An Off-Beats Valentine's (1999)
- Life (1999; 6-minute short)
- Sheep in the Big City (creator) (2000–2002)
- Codename: Kids Next Door (writer) (2002–2008)
- LazyTown (writer) (2004)
- Codename: Kids Next Door – Operation: Z.E.R.O. (writer) (2006)
- Sit Down, Shut Up (character designer) (2009)
- Naked Mole Rat Gets Dressed: The Underground Rock Experience (2022)
