= Cat the Cat =

Children's book series by Mo Willems

Cat the Cat is a book series for very early readers written and illustrated by award-winning children's author and illustrator, Mo Willems. The series began in February 2010 with the publication of two books, with additional books slated to follow soon thereafter.

== Reception ==
Prior to the first book's release, the Cat the Cat series garnered advance reviews including a starred review in Publishers Weekly, which said, "Willems provides just enough humor and surprise to entertain youngest audiences...Cat could become another favorite; her personality sparkles in expansive gestures and gleeful interactions." The series also has been mentioned in School Library Journal.

== Books ==
- Cat the Cat, Who Is That? (Feb 2010)
- Let's Say Hi to Friends Who Fly (Feb 2010)
- What's Your Sound, Hound the Hound? (Apr 2010)
- Time to Sleep, Sheep the Sheep! (Jun 2010)

=== Board Book Adaptations for the Very Youngest Readers ===
- Who Is That, Cat the Cat? (Apr 2014)
- Who Flies, Cat the Cat? (Apr 2014)
- Who Says That, Cat the Cat? (Aug 2014)
- Who Sleeps, Cat the Cat? (Aug 2014)

== Trivia ==
- The Pigeon, another series and character by Mo Willems, is hidden in each Cat the Cat book.
