= Elephant & Piggie =

Children's book series by Mo Willems

Gerald and Piggie

Elephant & Piggie is a children's book series created by Mo Willems. The series, which began in 2007 with two books, features two anthropomorphic animal friends, a male elephant named Gerald, and a female pig named Piggie. The books are written in a conversational style, with Piggie's words appearing in pink letter bubbles and Gerald's appearing in grey letter bubbles.

The series aims to teach early readers about the importance of friendship, and how to deal with life's problems. The books highlight how friendship is not always easy, but it is very important. The books exhibit simple vocabulary, repetition of phrases, and basic mathematical concepts to facilitate early reading. The series helps readers understand emotion. When the elephant is sad, the reader can tell on his face. The reader can also tell through the small font. When a character is happy, the text is larger.

The Elephant & Piggie series includes 25 books. Since then, Willems has developed a series called Elephant and Piggie Like Reading!, which features picture books by other authors. A musical has been produced based on the Elephant and Piggie books. Elephant & Piggie have also made visits to libraries around the world, including Lincoln City Libraries (LCL) so that children can interact with the characters.

The series has sold millions of copies, making it one of the most popular early reader series ever written, which many attribute the sense of humor throughout the series to its rise to fame.There Is a Bird on Your Head! and Are You Ready to Play Outside? received the Geisel Medal in 2008 and 2009. Today I Will Fly! (ranked #2 in 2007) and Elephants Cannot Dance! (ranked #5 in 2009) were listed on Time magazine's Top 10 Children's Books of the Year. An Elephant and Piggie Biggie! was named Publishers Weekly's best Children's Picture Book in July 2018.

On December 11, 2025, it was announced that an animated series adaptation titled The Elephant & Piggie Show! was greenlit by Paramount+ alongside The Pigeon Show! Starring the Pigeon (based on another Mo Willems children's book series).

== Plot ==
The series follows the lives of an elephant named Gerald and an pig named Piggie. The two contrasting characters are the best of friends. Gerald is antsy and serious, while Piggie is exuberant and lively. Willems aimed to teach his readership about the issues of friendship. Their relationship is very real as Elephant & Piggie, just like any other friendship, have their ups and downs.

The illustrations help the reader interpret emotions. The illustrations are simple, so the reader can easily understand how the characters are feeling based on their expression. Additionally, the word bubbles assist in conveying the character's feelings. The font will be smaller when a character is sad, and when a character is happy, the font will be very large.

The goal of the series is to help readers learn foundational skills to become good friends and people. Elephant and Piggie books often involve basic problems that teach problem solving skills. The series encompasses problem solving skills such as sharing, empathy, acceptance, and overcoming jealousy. At the end of each book, Elephant and Piggie overcome their problems and carry on being best friends.

== Books ==
1. Today I Will Fly! (Apr 2007)
  Piggie wants to fly, but Gerald doubts she'll be able to. Piggie recruits her friends to try to make her wish come true.
2. My Friend is Sad (Apr 2007)
  When Gerald is feeling sad, Piggie notices and wants to cheer him up. To do this, Piggie dresses up as all of Gerald's favorite things. Despite Piggie's best efforts, Gerald is still sad. Gerald doesn't recognize Piggie when she is all dressed up, and is sad that his friend can't witness all of the wonderful things he's seeing. Finally, Piggie realizes Gerald is sad because he needs new glasses.
3. I Am Invited to a Party! (Sep 2007)
  Piggie and Gerald are excited to be invited to a party, but they struggle to find the right outfit for the occasion. Can Gerald and Piggie find the perfect attire before the big day?
4. There Is a Bird on Your Head! (Sep 2007)
  Gerald is shocked to find a bird's nest on his head. Piggie tells Gerald about everything the birds are doing. Gerald loses his temper and asks the birds nicely to fly somewhere else, only for them to land on Piggie's head.
5. I Love My New Toy! (Jun 2008)
  Piggie is enraged when Gerald accidentally breaks her new toy in half, and then blames him for the damage he caused. Luckily, a squirrel notices that the item is, in fact, a break-and-snap toy.
6. I Will Surprise My Friend! (Jun 2008)
  After learning from a squirrel surprising her friend by a pebble, Gerald and Piggie decide to make a surprise of their own. They sneak by a big rock to make sure if it's true, but things go awry when they can't see each other. Gerald thinks Piggie is lost and needs to be rescued, while Piggie thinks Gerald is hungry and is about to grab lunch. Suddenly, they don't realize that when they try to save their lives, they are surprised by each other.
7. Are You Ready To Play Outside? (Oct 2008)
  It's a beautiful day and Gerald and Piggie want to do some outdoor activities, but then it starts to rain and Piggie is upset. Luckily, the duo see two worms enjoying the wet weather together, and with Gerald's advice, Piggie feels much better and gets used to rain after all.
8. Watch Me Throw The Ball! (Mar 2009)
  Piggie finds a ball that Gerald has thrown earlier, and she is desperate to throw it herself. Gerald is anxious that throwing a ball takes skill and practice, but Piggie ignores him and throws the ball anyway, only to allow it to fall behind her.
9. Elephants Cannot Dance! (Jun 2009)
  Piggie is a master at dancing, but Gerald is not sure that he might have a chance to succeed. So Piggie teaches Gerald how to dance, but he gets the steps wrong and quits. Fortunately, Gerald's raging gives Piggie a new idea for dancing.
10. Pigs Make Me Sneeze! (Oct 2009)
  Gerald has an unsettling case of the sneezes, thinking that pigs make him sneeze. He is upset that his friendship with Piggie will terminate...for good! When Gerald sees Doctor Cat, he reveals that Gerald has a cold, and Gerald feels better.
11. I Am Going! (Jan 2010)
  Gerald is mortified when Piggie realizes that she has to go. Gerald doesn't want Piggie to leave him, but things go upside down when she reveals her plan to have lunch.
12. Can I Play Too? (Jun 2010)
  A snake comes by, and wants to play catch with Gerald and Piggie. The truth is, he doesn't have arms and can't catch the ball very well. Luckily, Gerald and Piggie have an idea, and use the snake for their alternative.
13. We Are In A Book! (Sep 2010)
  An anxious Gerald tells Piggie that he notices someone looking at them. They step a little closer to find out if it's true, as it reveals to be a reader. From dancing, to jokes, to “bananas,” Piggie tells Gerald that the book is ending and he is mortified.
14. I Broke My Trunk! (Feb 2011)
  Piggie is surprised to see Gerald in a different-looking figure; he has a bandage on his trunk and doesn't know how he injured it. Gerald tells his backstory from when he was playing with Hippo and his sister, allowing Rhino to join as well. When Gerald tells Piggie he lifts the trio on his trunk, only to discover that they are very heavy to control, Piggie wants the main reason why he broke his trunk. So Gerald tells her that he ran over to tell his best friend about his new record, until he trips on a pebble, and falls.
15. Should I Share My Ice Cream? (Jun 2011)
  Gerald desperately contemplates sharing his ice cream with Piggie, but when he decides that sharing his ice cream is what is right, the ice cream has already melted, and Gerald is heartbroken. Later, Piggie comes over to Gerald holding an ice cream cone, and shares it with him.
16. Happy Pig Day! (Oct 2011)
  Pig Day is a day dedicated to pigs. Gerald is left out because he feels as though he cannot celebrate Pig Day, as he is not a pig. Piggie comforts Gerald by telling him that Pig Day can be celebrated by anyone who loves pigs! After being consoled by his friend, Gerald feels better and joins in on the celebrations of Pig Day.
17. Listen To My Trumpet! (Feb 2012)
  Piggie has a new trumpet and cannot wait to play it for Gerald. When Piggie plays, she is not the most talented trumpet player. She asks Gerald what he thinks of her trumpet playing, and Gerald does not want to hurt his friend's feelings. He tells Piggie that the trumpet is very loud and pretty.
18. Let's Go for a Drive! (Oct 2012)
  Piggie wants to go for a drive, but she and Gerald soon find out that being prepared for a road trip is a lot harder that they expected. Their plans go awry when they have everything they need...except a car!
19. A Big Guy Took My Ball! (May 2013)
  Piggie is upset when she tells Gerald that a big guy has stolen her favorite polka dot ball. They soon stand up to the giant, as it reveals to be a whale. He tells Gerald and Piggie that he is so big that nobody will play with him. Suddenly, the trio make up their idea and soon become friends.
20. I'm a Frog! (Oct 2013)
  Piggie pretends to be a frog, and she wants Gerald to participate. But Gerald keeps denying her endless wants, and Piggie is furious. Luckily, Gerald wants to pretend to be an animal of his own: a cow.
21. My New Friend Is So Fun! (Jun 2014)
  Snake, Gerald's friend, tells him that Brian Bat, HIS friend, is playing with Piggie. Both become anxious and worried that they will lose Piggie and Brian as their best friends. However, they later realize that Brian and Piggie were drawing pictures of them. Gerald soon learns his lesson that he and Piggie will always be friends, and he should not get jealous.
22. Waiting Is Not Easy! (Nov 2014)
  Gerald is ecstatic when Piggie has a big surprise to show him. Unfortunately, he has to wait for it to show, and is impatient. By now, it is dark outside and Gerald is still fed up of waiting. Then, Piggie notices something in mid-air: a city of sparkling stars.
23. I Will Take a Nap! (Jun 2015)
  Gerald is tired and cranky, so he takes a nap and hopes to have good dreams. In his dream, Piggie distracts Gerald from his sleep, and doesn't notice that he is cranky. Piggie is cranky too, so she joins in. During her nap, she makes too many loud snoring noises, and Gerald can't sleep. Suddenly, he can imagine Piggie being a floating turnip head.
24. I Really Like Slop! (Oct 2015)
  Gerald is highly disgusted when Piggie walks in with her slop. Piggie says that eating slop is a good life for us pigs and she wants Gerald to try some. Despite Gerald disliking her recipe, since he thinks it's spicy, he is glad he tried the slop.
25. The Thank You Book (May 2016)
  In their last adventure, Piggie wants to thank every one of her friends for all the wonderful memories they had, but Gerald thinks Piggie is forgetting someone very important: their reader!

== Other editions ==
Books in the series Elephant & Piggie Like Reading!

1. We Are Growing! (Sep 2016)
2. The Cookie Fiasco (Sep 2016)
3. The Good for Nothing Button! (May 2017)
4. It's Shoe Time! (Nov 2017)
5. The Itchy Book (May 2018)
6. Harold & Hog Pretend for Real! (May 2019)
7. What About Worms?! (May 2020)
8. I'm On It! (May 2021)
9. It's a Sign! (May 2022)

There has been a musical made of Elephant & Piggie. The purpose of their musical is to teach young children about the theater. The title of the play is “We Are In A Play!”
