= List of fictional dinosaurs =

Fictional dinosaurs

This list of fictional dinosaurs is subsidiary to the list of fictional animals and is a collection of various notable non-avian dinosaur characters that appear in various works of fiction. It is limited to well-referenced examples of dinosaurs and related prehistoric reptiles in literature, film, television, comics, animation, video games and mythology, and applies only to non-avian dinosaur species that lived from the Triassic Period until the end of the Cretaceous.

== Literature ==
| Name | Species | Work | Author | Notes |
|---|---|---|---|---|
| Afsan | Tyrannosaurus rex | Far-Seer | Robert J. Sawyer | The main character of Sawyer's Quintaglio Ascension Trilogy, Afsan is an astronomer who discovers the truth about the planet on which a transplanted population of dinosaurs lives. Publishers Weekly notes that he represents "the combined roles in Quintaglio society of Pythagoras, Magellan, Copernicus, Galileo, da Vinci and Jesus of Nazareth". |
| Bix | Protoceratops | Dinotopia | James Gurney | An ambassador and companion to Arthur Denison. |
| Cay | Brontosaurus | Beyond the Great South Wall: Being Some Surprising Details of the Voyage of the S Y Racoon | Frank Savile | In this 1899 novel, archaeologists searching Antarctica for the remains of Mayan mummies and treasures discover "the god" Cay, a brontosaurus with "hypnotic eyes". |
| Crackers | Quetzalcoatlus | Captain Underpants | Dav Pilkey | A "pterodactyl" that George and Harold bring to the present day using the Purple Potty. She is mistaken to be a male throughout the series. |
| Cyclops | Utahraptor | Primitive War: Opiate Undertow | Ethan Pettus | |
| Dazzle | Ouranosaurus | Dazzle the Dinosaur | Marcus Pfister | |
| Dinosaur | Dinosaur | Dinosaur vs. Bedtime | Bob Shea | An unnamed young dinosaur taking on a series of challenges before going to bed. |
| Dybo | Tyrannosaurus rex | Far-Seer | Robert J. Sawyer | Emperor of the T-Rexes transplanted to another planet, a fat and rather stupid dinosaur who betrays his best friend. |
| Edwina | Alamosaurus | Edwina, the Dinosaur Who Didn't Know She Was Extinct | Mo Willems | A kind and well-loved dinosaur, ostracised only by Reginald Von Hoobie-Doobie. |
| Kal-ta-goot | Plesiosaur | Far-Seer | Robert J. Sawyer | A huge-toothed swimming dinosaur who maims Keenir, a Tyrannosaurus rex, and is hunted by him to the death, like Moby Dick. |
| Keenir | Tyrannosaurus rex | Far-Seer | Robert J. Sawyer | Ship's captain obsessively seeking revenge against the plesiosaur which bit off his tail, this "master mariner" represents Captain Ahab in Moby-Dick, pursuing his own white whale. |
| The Lizard | Crocodilian | "The Lizard" | C. J. Cutcliffe Hyne | A spelunker, Chesney, investigates a cave in Yorkshire and discovers a creature "having the form of a crocodile". Story first published in 1898, reprinted in The Birth of Science Fiction, ed. Isaac Asimov et al., 1981. |
| Old Bess | Tyrannosaurus rex | The Rider, other "Siglerverse" properties | Scott Sigler | A genetically resurrected T-Rex deployed in the fictional sport of Dinolition by Poughkeepsie Pete of the Roughland Ridgebacks. |
| Raptor Red | Utahraptor | Raptor Red | Robert T. Bakker | A female Utahraptor that lost her mate. |
| Rex | Tyrannosaurus rex | We're Back! A Dinosaur's Story | Hudson Talbott | A dinosaur who is turned by an alien into a sapient specimen and sent with other sapient dinosaurs to the city of New York. |
| Rexy | Tyrannosaurus rex | Jurassic Park | Michael Chrichton | The first T-Rex to be cloned by InGen. |
| Scarface | Tyrannosaurus rex | Bones of the Earth | Michael Swanwick | In this multiple-award-nominated novel describing a great many dinosaur species during the Upper Cretaceous of the Mesozoic Era, Scarface is a juvenile in a family of T-Rexes being observed by time-traveling paleontologists and actually attacks part of the team. Based on Swanwick's 1999 short story "Scherzo with Tyrannosaur". |
| Tyrone | Tyrannosaurus rex | Tyrone the Horrible | Hans Wilhelm | A green T-Rex who always bullies Boland and other dinosaurs, though Boland finds a means to end his menace. |
| Uncle Beazley | Triceratops | The Enormous Egg | Oliver Butterworth | The Twitchell family's hen lays an egg containing a Triceratops, and the boy Nate raises him, with many adventures. A 1968 film adaptation was televised on the NBC Children's Theatre. Uncle Beazley is memorialized as a life-size statue located in the National Zoo in Washington, D.C. |
| Wilma | Apatosaurus megacephalos | Corrupting Dr. Nice | John Kessel | Time-traveling paleontologist Owen Vannice brings a new species to 2063 for study. He names her after Wilma Flintstone, and one of her nest-mates after Betty Rubble. Besides flowers and trees, Owen feeds her oatmeal and orchids. Humorous political adventures involve Wilma in this screwball comedy. |
| Unnamed | Ichthyosaurus and Plesiosaurus | Journey to the Center of the Earth | Jules Verne | These two marine monsters battle each other in the 1864 novel, which was illustrated by Édouard Riou, though there are no true dinosaurs in the novel. They appear in the 1959 film adaptation, while Xiphactinus, Elasmosaurus and Giganotosaurus are additional creatures in the 2008 version. |
| Unnamed | Ankylosaurus (?) | The Lost Continent: The Story of Atlantis | C. J. Cutcliffe Hyne | Mammoths and dinosaurs, one of them with great horny plates and spines along its sides, dwell alongside the citizens of lost Atlantis in this 1899 novel. |
| Unnamed | Iguanodon | The Lost World | Arthur Conan Doyle | Professor Challenger explores a South American volcanic plateau, where he and his academic team find several dinosaurs, including an "Iguanodont" herd. The professors attempt to explain how they have survived until 1912, and decide that the volcano preserved the hidden plateau and allowed "strange accidental conditions" for survival. |
| Unnamed | Stegosaurus | The Lost World | Arthur Conan Doyle | Professor Challenger explores a South American volcanic plateau, where he and his academic team find several dinosaurs, including Stegosaurus. |
| Unnamed | Unknown | I'm A Dirty Dinosaur, I'm A Hungry Dinosaur | Janeen Brian | A small dinosaur that likes mud and cake. |
| Unnamed | Sauropod | Danny and the Dinosaur | Syd Hoff | First published by Harper & Brothers in 1958. It has sold over ten million copies and has been translated into a dozen languages. |

== Comics and manga ==
| Name | Species | Work | Author | Notes |
|---|---|---|---|---|
| Archie | Tyrannosaurus rex | Dinosaurs for Hire | Tom Mason | |
| Aviatrix | Pterosaur | XTNCT | Paul Cornell and D'Israeli | |
| Benkei | Troodon | Dinosaur Sanctuary | Itaru Kinoshita | Imprints on Suma Suzume, a rookie zookeeper employed at Enoshima Dinoland, who takes care of Benkei. |
| Bloodfeast the Extreme-inator | Tyrannosaurus rex | The Order of the Stick | Rich Burlew | Used as a monster for a fighting arena before being freed and adopted by Belkar Bitterleaf, the team's ranger. |
| Brontson | Brontosaurus | Horacio's World | Mauricio de Sousa | |
| Cyrano | Pterodactyl | Dinosaurs for Hire | Tom Mason | |
| Devil Dinosaur | Tyrannosaurus rex | Devil Dinosaur | Jack Kirby | |
| Dinny | Brachiosaurus | Alley Oop | V.T. Hamlin | Pet dinosaur of Alley Oop. |
| Dromiceiomimus | Dromiceiomimus | Dinosaur Comics | Ryan North | |
| Gon | Tyrannosaurus rex | Gon | Masashi Tanaka | A baby T-Rex. |
| Horácio | Tyrannosaurus rex | Turma do Piteco (The Cavern Clan) and Horacio's World | Mauricio de Sousa | A baby T-Rex who was first introduced as the pet of Pitheco the caveman in The Cavern Clan, after which it received its own spin-off, Horacio's World. |
| Lollo | Brontosaurus | Suske en Wiske in the album De Groene Splinter (The Green Splinter). | Willy Vandersteen | A cute little dinosaur the characters encounter while travelling to prehistoric times. |
| Lorenzo | Triceratops | Dinosaurs for Hire | Tom Mason | |
| Lucinda | Tyrannosaurus rex | Horacio's World | Mauricio de Sousa | |
| Old Lace | Deinonychus | Runaways | Brian K. Vaughan | Companion to Gertrude Yorkes. |
| Raptor | Deinonychus | XTNCT | Paul Cornell and D'Israeli | |
| Reese | Stegosaurus | Dinosaurs for Hire | Tom Mason | |
| Rex | Tyrannosaurus rex | Boner's Ark | Mort Walker | One of the passengers aboard Boner's Ark. |
| Rex | Tyrannosaurus rex | XTNCT | Paul Cornell and D'Israeli | |
| Satanus | Tyrannosaurus rex | Flesh/Judge Dredd | Kelvin Gosnell and Ramon Sola | |
| Stegy | Stegosaurus | The Phantom | Lee Falk and Sy Barry | |
| Super Dinosaur | Tyrannosaurus rex | Super Dinosaur | Robert Kirkman and Jason Howard | |
| Terry Pterodactyl | Pterodactyl | Horacio's World | Mauricio de Sousa | |
| T-Rex | Tyrannosaurus rex | Dinosaur Comics | Ryan North | |
| Theco | Thecodont | Horacio's World | Mauricio de Sousa | |
| Todd | Tyrannosaurus rex | Todd the Dinosaur | Patrick Roberts | |
| "The Traveller from the Mesozoicum" | Brontosaurus | Spirou et Fantasio in the album Le voyageur du Mésozoïque. | André Franquin | A dinosaur whose egg has been breed out by the Count de Champignac and goes out on a rampage afterwards. |
| Trike | Triceratops | XTNCT | Paul Cornell and D'Israeli | |
| Tyrant | Tyrannosaurus rex | Tyrant | Steve Bissette | |
| Urhunden | Brontosaurus | Urhunden | Oskar Andersson | A dinosaur treated as an "ancient dog" by his owner. |
| Utahraptor | Utahraptor | Dinosaur Comics | Ryan North | |
| Yuki | Giganotosaurus | Dinosaur Sanctuary | Itaru Kinoshita | |

== Film and television ==
| Name | Species | Film/show | Notes | |
|---|---|---|---|---|
| Gwangi | Allosaurus | The Valley of Gwangi | In this 1969 film, a group of cowboys discover dinosaurs living in a valley in Mexico. Dinosaur stop motion animation by Ray Harryhausen, who said Gwangi was a cross between Allosaurus and Tyrannosaurus rex. "We sometimes called it an Allosaurus ... They're both meat eaters, they're both Tyrants." | |
| Unnamed | Pteranodon | The Valley of Gwangi | After it attacks the cowboys, Carlos kills it. | |
| Unnamed | Ornithomimus | The Valley of Gwangi | Cowboys try to capture the Ornithomimus to use in a rodeo, but Gwangi kills it. | |
| Unnamed | Styracosaurus | The Valley of Gwangi | The Styracosaurus saves the humans when it chases Gwangi away, but eventually Gwangi kills it. | |
| Barney | Tyrannosaurus rex | Barney & Friends | The friendly, optimistic, purple title character of the series. | |
| Baby Bop | Triceratops | Barney & Friends | A three-year-old green girl and a companion of Barney. | |
| B.J. | Protoceratops | Barney & Friends | A seven-year-old yellow boy and a companion of Barney. | |
| Riff | Saurolophus | Barney & Friends | An orange six-year-old boy and a companion of Barney. | |
| Baby | Brontosaurus | Baby: Secret of the Lost Legend | The youngest of the group, found by an American family in an African jungle. | |
| Dorothy | Megalosaurus | The Wiggles | One of the regular characters, who has also featured in her own programme. | |
| Earl Sinclair | Megalosaurus | Dinosaurs | | |
| Fran Sinclair | Allosaurus | Dinosaurs | | |
| Robbie Sinclair | Hypsilophodon | Dinosaurs | | |
| Charlene Sinclair | Protoceratops | Dinosaurs | | |
| Baby Sinclair | Megalosaurus | Dinosaurs | | |
| Tom Carter | Tyrannosaurus rex, Velociraptor, Ankylosaurus, and Triceratops | Dinofroz | A heroic team went back in time to stop the evil dragons from changing the future. | |
| Bob | Triceratops | Dinofroz | A heroic team went back in time to stop the evil dragons from changing the future. | |
| Eric | Pterosaur | Dinofroz | A heroic team went back in time to stop the evil dragons from changing the future. | |
| Ms. Moynihan | Velociraptor | Dinofroz | A heroic team went back in time to stop the evil dragons from changing the future. | |
| Max | Tyrannosaurus rex | DinoSquad | A group of five teenagers led by their science teacher, Ms. Moynihan a surviving female velociraptor to stop the main antagonist of the series and a business magnate who owns Raptor Dyne, the male velociraptor, Dr. Victor Veloci. Together they transform into dinosaurs to save the world from reverting to the age of the dinosaurs by creating mutant hybrids. | |
| Caruso | Stegosaurus | DinoSquad | A group of five teenagers led by their science teacher, Ms. Moynihan a surviving female velociraptor to stop the main antagonist of the series and a business magnate who owns Raptor Dyne, the male velociraptor, Dr. Victor Veloci. Together they transform into dinosaurs to save the world from reverting to the age of the dinosaurs by creating mutant hybrids. | |
| Fiona | Spinosaurus | DinoSquad | A group of five teenagers led by their science teacher, Ms. Moynihan a surviving female velociraptor to stop the main antagonist of the series and a business magnate who owns Raptor Dyne, the male velociraptor, Dr. Victor Veloci. Together they transform into dinosaurs to save the world from reverting to the age of the dinosaurs by creating mutant hybrids. | |
| Rodger | Styracosaurus | DinoSquad | A group of five teenagers led by their science teacher, Ms. Moynihan a surviving female velociraptor to stop the main antagonist of the series and a business magnate who owns Raptor Dyne, the male velociraptor, Dr. Victor Veloci. Together they transform into dinosaurs to save the world from reverting to the age of the dinosaurs by creating mutant hybrids. | |
| Buzz | Pteranodon | DinoSquad | A group of five teenagers led by their science teacher, Ms. Moynihan a surviving female velociraptor to stop the main antagonist of the series and a business magnate who owns Raptor Dyne, the male velociraptor, Dr. Victor Veloci. Together they transform into dinosaurs to save the world from reverting to the age of the dinosaurs by creating mutant hybrids. | |
| Dr. Victor Veloci | Velociraptor | DinoSquad | A group of five teenagers led by their science teacher, Ms. Moynihan a surviving female velociraptor to stop the main antagonist of the series and a business magnate who owns Raptor Dyne, the male velociraptor, Dr. Victor Veloci. Together they transform into dinosaurs to save the world from reverting to the age of the dinosaurs by creating mutant hybrids. | |
| Elvis | Tyrannosaurus rex | Prehysteria! | A group of preserved baby dinosaurs, found and stolen by Rico Sarno and adopted by Frank Taylor. | |
| Paula | Brachiosaurus | Prehysteria! | A group of preserved baby dinosaurs, found and stolen by Rico Sarno and adopted by Frank Taylor. | |
| Jagger | Stegosaurus | Prehysteria! | A group of preserved baby dinosaurs, found and stolen by Rico Sarno and adopted by Frank Taylor. | |
| Hammer | Chasmosaurus | Prehysteria! | A group of preserved baby dinosaurs, found and stolen by Rico Sarno and adopted by Frank Taylor. | |
| Madonna | Pteranodon | Prehysteria! | A group of preserved baby dinosaurs, found and stolen by Rico Sarno and adopted by Frank Taylor. | |
| Gachapin | Stegosaurus | Hirake! Ponkikki | | |
| Godzilla | Prehistoric monster | Godzilla | Also known as King of the Monsters, a fictional dinosaur from Japanese Daikaiju films | |
| Guardian Beast Tyrannosaurus / Tyrannosaurus Dinozord | Tyrannosaurus rex | Kyōryū Sentai Zyuranger / Mighty Morphin Power Rangers | | |
| Guardian Beast Triceratops / Triceratops Dinozord | Triceratops | Kyōryū Sentai Zyuranger / Mighty Morphin Power Rangers | | |
| Guardian Beast Pteranodon / Pterodactyl Dinozord | Pteranodon | Kyōryū Sentai Zyuranger / Mighty Morphin Power Rangers | | |
| Beast Knight God King Brachion / Titanus | Brachiosaurus | Kyōryū Sentai Zyuranger / Mighty Morphin Power Rangers | | |
| Bakuryu Tyrannosaurus / Tyrannozord | Tyrannosaurus rex | Bakuryū Sentai Abaranger / Power Rangers Dino Thunder | | |
| Bakuryu Triceratops / Tricerazord | Triceratops | Bakuryū Sentai Abaranger / Power Rangers Dino Thunder | | |
| Bakuryu Pteranodon / Pterazord | Pteranodon | Bakuryū Sentai Abaranger / Power Rangers Dino Thunder | | |
| Bakuryu Brachiosaurus / Brachiozord | Brachiosaurus | Bakuryū Sentai Abaranger / Power Rangers Dino Thunder | | |
| Bakuryu TopGaler / Dragozord | Tupuxuara | Bakuryū Sentai Abaranger / Power Rangers Dino Thunder | | |
| Bakuryu Stegoslidon / Stegozord | Stegosaurus | Bakuryū Sentai Abaranger / Power Rangers Dino Thunder | | |
| Bakuryu Bachycelonagurus / Cephalozord | Pachycephalosaurus | Bakuryū Sentai Abaranger / Power Rangers Dino Thunder | | |
| Bakuryu Parasorrokiru / Parazord | Parasaurolophus | Bakuryū Sentai Abaranger / Power Rangers Dino Thunder | | |
| Bakuryu Ankyloveilus / Ankylozord | Ankylosaurus | Bakuryū Sentai Abaranger / Power Rangers Dino Thunder | | |
| Bakuryu Carnoleutus / Carnozord | Carnotaurus | Bakuryū Sentai Abaranger / Power Rangers Dino Thunder | | |
| Bakuryu Chasmoshieldon / Chasmozord | Chasmosaurus | Bakuryū Sentai Abaranger / Power Rangers Dino Thunder | | |
| Gabutyra / T-Rex Zord | Tyrannosaurus rex | Zyuden Sentai Kyoryuger / Power Rangers Dino Charge and Power Rangers Dino Super Charge | Mecha piloted by the titular teams. T-Rex Zord is affectionately nicknamed "Rexy". | |
| Parasagun / Para Zord | Parasaurolophus | Zyuden Sentai Kyoryuger / Power Rangers Dino Charge and Power Rangers Dino Super Charge | Mecha piloted by the titular teams. T-Rex Zord is affectionately nicknamed "Rexy". | |
| Stegochi / Stego Zord | Stegosaurus | Zyuden Sentai Kyoryuger / Power Rangers Dino Charge and Power Rangers Dino Super Charge | Mecha piloted by the titular teams. T-Rex Zord is affectionately nicknamed "Rexy". | |
| Zakutor / Raptor Zord | Velociraptor | Zyuden Sentai Kyoryuger / Power Rangers Dino Charge and Power Rangers Dino Super Charge | Mecha piloted by the titular teams. T-Rex Zord is affectionately nicknamed "Rexy". | |
| Dricera / Tricera Zord | Triceratops | Zyuden Sentai Kyoryuger / Power Rangers Dino Charge and Power Rangers Dino Super Charge | Mecha piloted by the titular teams. T-Rex Zord is affectionately nicknamed "Rexy". | |
| Pteragordon / Ptera Zord | Pteranodon | Zyuden Sentai Kyoryuger / Power Rangers Dino Charge and Power Rangers Dino Super Charge | Mecha piloted by the titular teams. T-Rex Zord is affectionately nicknamed "Rexy". | |
| Ankydon / Ankylo Zord | Ankylosaurus | Zyuden Sentai Kyoryuger / Power Rangers Dino Charge and Power Rangers Dino Super Charge | Mecha piloted by the titular teams. T-Rex Zord is affectionately nicknamed "Rexy". | |
| Bunpachy / Pachy Zord | Pachycephalosaurus | Zyuden Sentai Kyoryuger / Power Rangers Dino Charge and Power Rangers Dino Super Charge | Mecha piloted by the titular teams. T-Rex Zord is affectionately nicknamed "Rexy". | |
| Plezuon / Plesio Zord | Plesiosaurus | Zyuden Sentai Kyoryuger / Power Rangers Dino Charge and Power Rangers Dino Super Charge | Mecha piloted by the titular teams. T-Rex Zord is affectionately nicknamed "Rexy". | |
| Bragigas / Titano Zord | Brachiosaurus | Zyuden Sentai Kyoryuger / Power Rangers Dino Charge and Power Rangers Dino Super Charge | Mecha piloted by the titular teams. T-Rex Zord is affectionately nicknamed "Rexy". | |
| Tobaspino / Spino Zord | Spinosaurus | Zyuden Sentai Kyoryuger / Power Rangers Dino Charge and Power Rangers Dino Super Charge | Mecha piloted by the titular teams. T-Rex Zord is affectionately nicknamed "Rexy". | |
| Anguirus | Ankylosaurus | Godzilla Raids Again | | |
| Baragon | Baranosdragon | Frankenstein Conquers the World | | |
| Grimlock | Tyrannosaurus rex | Transformers | Leader of the Dinobots | |
| Gorosaurus | Gorosaurus | King Kong Escapes | A descendant of the dinosaur Allosaurus, which lived in the late Jurassic about 150 million years ago, it was discovered on Mondo Island by a United Nations exploration unit. | |
| Bumpy | Ankylosaurus | Jurassic World Camp Cretaceous | Adored by Camp Cretaceous fans and notable for her asymmetrical horns on her head | |
| Ghost | Atrociraptor | Jurassic World Camp Cretaceous | Jurassic World Dominion | Primary raptor in the pack trained by Soyona Santos. |
| Panthera | Atrociraptor | Jurassic World Camp Cretaceous | Jurassic World Dominion | One of the raptors in the pack trained by Sonyona Santaos. |
| Tiger | Atrociraptor | Jurassic World Camp Cretaceous | Jurassic World Dominion | One of the raptors in the pack trained by Sonyona Santaos. |
| Red | Atrociraptor | Jurassic World Camp Cretaceous | Jurassic World Dominion | One of the raptors in the pack trained by Sonyona Santaos. |
| Toro | Carnotaurus | Jurassic World Camp Cretaceous | Named after the Spanish word for "bull" and because of the horns on his head | |
| Parasaurolophus lux | Parasaurolophus | Jurassic World Camp Cretaceous | A bioluminescent variant of the Parasaurolophus genetically engineered by Henry Wu. | |
| Maria | Sinoceratops | Jurassic World Camp Cretaceous | | |
| Chaos | Baryonyx | Jurassic World Camp Cretaceous | Named after the Hacker Gang in the Aster Stone series episode 68 | |
| Grim | Baryonyx | Jurassic World Camp Cretaceous | Named after the Hacker Gang in the Aster Stone series episode 68 | |
| Limbo | Baryonyx | Jurassic World Camp Cretaceous | Named after the Hacker Gang in the Aster Stone series episode 68 | |
| Scorpios Rex | Scorpios Rex | Jurassic World Camp Cretaceous | This hybrid (created from the species Tyrannosaurus rex, Velociraptor, and Carnotaurus) serves as one of the series's main antagonists. | |
| Big Eatie | Tyrannosaurus rex | Jurassic World Camp Cretaceous | Mother and daughter extracted from Isla Sorna | |
| Little Eatie | Tyrannosaurus rex | Jurassic World Camp Cretaceous | Mother and daughter extracted from Isla Sorna | |
| Pierce | Kentrosaurus | Raised by Dr. Mae Turner and is able to communicate with him through her tablet | | |
| Firecracker | Brachiosaurus | 2 months old extracted from live specimen on Isla Sorna | | |
| Angel | Spinoceratops | These hybrids (not made by Dr. Wu) were made by Mantah Corp when Sammy brought the sample of the Sinoceratops and mixed it with Spinosaurus DNA. | | |
| Rebel | Spinoceratops | These hybrids (not made by Dr. Wu) were made by Mantah Corp when Sammy brought the sample of the Sinoceratops and mixed it with Spinosaurus DNA. | | |
| Blue | Velociraptor | Jurassic World | Primary raptor in the pack trained by Owen Grady. | |
| Charlie | Velociraptor | Jurassic World | One of the raptors in the pack trained by Owen Grady. | |
| Delta | Velociraptor | Jurassic World | One of the raptors in the pack trained by Owen Grady. | |
| Echo | Velociraptor | Jurassic World | One of the raptors in the pack trained by Owen Grady. | |
| Indominus rex | | Jurassic World | This hybrid (created from the species Tyrannosaurus rex and Velociraptor, among others) serves as one of the film's main antagonists. | |
| Indoraptor | | Jurassic World: Fallen Kingdom | This hybrid (created from a sample of the Indominus rex and Velociraptor, among others) serves as one of the film's main antagonists. | |
| Behemoth | Palaeosaurus | Behemoth, the Sea Monster | A prehistoric gargantuan dinosaur saturated by radiation. | |
| Rhedosaurus | Rhedosaurus | The Beast from 20,000 Fathoms | A frozen carnivore unleashed from the Arctic by a nuclear bomb test. | |
| Speckles | Tarbosaurus | The Dino King; Dino King 3D: Journey to Fire Mountain | A Tarbosaurus who was orphaned after his siblings' deaths were caused, and his mother was murdered, by a territorial Tyrannosaurus rex. | |
| Herb | Brachiosaurus | Sesame Street | A plant-eating orange dinosaur who once came to Sesame Street | |
| Theodore Rex | Tyrannosaurus rex | Theodore Rex | A genetically created dinosaur who teams up with Whoopi Goldberg to investigate a murder. | |
| Titanosaurus | Titanosaurus | Terror of Mechagodzilla | | |
| V-Rex / Quantasaurus Rex | Tyrannosaurus rex | Mirai Sentai Timeranger / Power Rangers Time Force | Partner mecha of TimeFire / Quantum Ranger. | |
| Tyramigo / T-Rex Champion Zord | Tyrannosaurus rex | Kishiryu Sentai Ryusoulger / Power Rangers Dino Fury | RyusoulRed/Dino Fury Red's partner. Can transform into KishiryuOh/Battle Mode. | |
| Triken / Tricera Blade Zord | Triceratops | Kishiryu Sentai Ryusoulger / Power Rangers Dino Fury | RyusoulBlue/Dino Fury Blue's partner | |
| Ankyloze / Ankylo Hammer Zord | Ankylosaurus | Kishiryu Sentai Ryusoulger / Power Rangers Dino Fury | RyusoulPink/Dino Fury Pink's partner | |
| Milneedle / Stego Spike Zord | Miragaia / Stegosaurus | Kishiryu Sentai Ryusoulger / Power Rangers Dino Fury | RyusoulBlack/Dino Fury Black's partner | |
| Mosarex / Mosa Razor Zord | Mosasaurus | Kishiryu Sentai Ryusoulger / Power Rangers Dino Fury | Ryusoul/Dino Fury Gold's partner. Can transform into KishiryuNeptune/Battle Mode. | |
| Pachygaroo and Chibigaroo / Pacha Smash Zord and Baby Pacha Zord | Pachycephalosaurus | Kishiryu Sentai Ryusoulger / Power Rangers Dino Fury | | |
| Pterardon / Ptera Freeze Zord | Pteranodon | Kishiryu Sentai Ryusoulger / Power Rangers Dino Fury | Can transform into YokuRyuOh/Battle Mode. | |
| Yonggary | Ceratosaurus | Kishiryu Sentai Ryusougler | | A mutant dinosaur. |
| Vastatosaurus rex | Tyrannosaurus rex | King Kong (2005) | Descendant of Tyrannosaurus rex | |

== Animation ==
| Name | Species | Show | Notes |
|---|---|---|---|
| Aladar | Iguanodon | Dinosaur | An Iguanodon, who was adopted by a lemur, Plio. Aladar is voiced by D.B. Sweeney. |
| Allo | Allosaurus | Dinosaucers | Members of the Dinosaucers, a group from an alien planet known as Reptilon, who save the Earth from a malicious dinosaur named Tyrannos. |
| Bonehead | Pachycephalosaurus | Dinosaucers | Members of the Dinosaucers, a group from an alien planet known as Reptilon, who save the Earth from a malicious dinosaur named Tyrannos. |
| Bronto Thunder | Apatosaurus | Dinosaucers | Members of the Dinosaucers, a group from an alien planet known as Reptilon, who save the Earth from a malicious dinosaur named Tyrannos. |
| Stego | Stegosaurus | Dinosaucers | Members of the Dinosaucers, a group from an alien planet known as Reptilon, who save the Earth from a malicious dinosaur named Tyrannos. |
| Tricero | Triceratops | Dinosaucers | Members of the Dinosaucers, a group from an alien planet known as Reptilon, who save the Earth from a malicious dinosaur named Tyrannos. |
| Ankylo | Ankylosaurus | Dinosaucers | Members of the Tyrannos, a group from an alien planet known as Reptilon, who attempt to conquer the Earth. |
| Brachio | Brachiosaurus | Dinosaucers | Members of the Tyrannos, a group from an alien planet known as Reptilon, who attempt to conquer the Earth. |
| Genghis Rex | Tyrannosaurus | Dinosaucers | Members of the Tyrannos, a group from an alien planet known as Reptilon, who attempt to conquer the Earth. |
| Plesio | Plesiosaurus | Dinosaucers | Members of the Tyrannos, a group from an alien planet known as Reptilon, who attempt to conquer the Earth. |
| Princess Dei | Deinonychus | Dinosaucers | Members of the Tyrannos, a group from an alien planet known as Reptilon, who attempt to conquer the Earth. |
| Quackpot | Hadrosaurus | Dinosaucers | Members of the Tyrannos, a group from an alien planet known as Reptilon, who attempt to conquer the Earth. |
| Styraco | Styracosaurus | Dinosaucers | Members of the Tyrannos, a group from an alien planet known as Reptilon, who attempt to conquer the Earth. |
| Arlo | Apatosaurus | The Good Dinosaur | |
| Buddy | Tyrannosaurus rex | Dinosaur Train | He likes to ask questions and form hypotheses. |
| Craig | Triceratops | CollegeHumor | A male brown dinosaur who is friends with Todd and has a crush on Sheila. |
| Chomp | Triceratops | Dinosaur King | The three main dinosaurs of the D-Team. |
| Paris | Parasaurolophus | Dinosaur King | The three main dinosaurs of the D-Team. |
| Ace | Carnotaurus | Dinosaur King | The three main dinosaurs of the D-Team. |
| Terry | Tyrannosaurus | Dinosaur King | The three main dinosaurs of the Alpha Gang. |
| Tank | Saichania | Dinosaur King | The three main dinosaurs of the Alpha Gang. |
| Spiny | Spinosaurus | Dinosaur King | The three main dinosaurs of the Alpha Gang. |
| Dad | Tyrannosaurus rex | Tim Rex in Space | A green dinosaur who is Tim's father. |
| Grandma | Tyrannosaurus rex | Tim Rex in Space | A light blue dinosaur who is Tim's grandmother. |
| Mum | Tyrannosaurus rex | Tim Rex in Space | A blue dinosaur who is Tim's mother. |
| Tia | Tyrannosaurus rex | Tim Rex in Space | A pink dinosaur who is Tim's sister. |
| Tim | Tyrannosaurus rex | Tim Rex in Space | A yellow dinosaur who is the main protagonist. |
| Tommy | Tyrannosaurus rex | Tim Rex in Space | An orange dinosaur who is Tim's brother. |
| Iggy | Brontosaurus | Tim Rex in Space | A red dinosaur who is Tim's friend. |
| Poppy | Brontosaurus | Tim Rex in Space | A coral pink dinosaur who is Tim's friend. |
| Kai | Triceratops | Tim Rex in Space | A blue dinosaur who is Tim's best friend. |
| Steggy | Stegosaurus | Tim Rex in Space | A dark green dinosaur who is Tim's friend. |
| Terri | Pterodactyl | Tim Rex in Space | A green dinosaur who is Tim's friend. |
| Denver | Corythosaurus | Denver, the Last Dinosaur | Released from a preserved egg in 1988 California. |
| Dink | Apatosaurus | Dink, the Little Dinosaur | A nice, brave and smart orphaned young dinosaur, who has a strong bond with his friends. |
| Dino | Snorkosaurus | The Flintstones | Imbued with the characteristics of a pet canine. |
| Dyno | Tyrannosaurus rex | Foster's Home for Imaginary Friends | A purple T-Rex who is one of the background imaginary friends |
| Gertie the Dinosaur | Brontosaurus | Gertie the Dinosaur (1914) | Smiles and interacts with animator Winsor McCay. |
| Gunther | Theropoda | Adventure Time | A green male dinosaur who was Urgence Evergreen's apprentice in the episode "Evergreen". |
| Nina | Protoceratops | Adventure Time | A yellow female dinosaur who was Gunther's pet in the episode "Evergreen". |
| Horacio | Tyrannosaurus rex | Horacio's World | A baby dinosaur philosopher. |
| Heart | Tyrannosaurus rex | You Are Umasou | A kind hearted dinosaur who runs away from his family out of fear of harming them after his predatory instincts become apparent, and finds a baby dinosaur who he adopts as his son. |
| Umasou | Ankylosaurus | You Are Umasou | A baby dinosaur who Heart meets, and believes him to be his dad, treating him as such, after the latter attempts to eat him. |
| Kyu & Myu | Unknown Feathered dinosaur | Doraemon: Nobita's New Dinosaur | |
| Littlefoot | Apatosaurus | The Land Before Time | A group of young, adventurous dinosaurs who dwell in the "Great Valley". |
| Cera | Triceratops | The Land Before Time | A group of young, adventurous dinosaurs who dwell in the "Great Valley". |
| Ducky | Saurolophus | The Land Before Time | A group of young, adventurous dinosaurs who dwell in the "Great Valley". |
| Petrie | Pteranodon | The Land Before Time | A group of young, adventurous dinosaurs who dwell in the "Great Valley". |
| Spike | Stegosaurus | The Land Before Time | A group of young, adventurous dinosaurs who dwell in the "Great Valley". |
| Chomper | Tyrannosaurus rex | The Land Before Time | A group of young, adventurous dinosaurs who dwell in the "Great Valley". |
| Ruby | Oviraptor | The Land Before Time | A group of young, adventurous dinosaurs who dwell in the "Great Valley". |
| Mr. Gus | Tyrannosaurus rex | Uncle Grandpa | A green dinosaur who is Uncle Grandpa's friend and bodyguard. He is voiced by Kevin Michael Richardson. |
| Nana | Spinosaurus | Crayon Shin-chan the Movie: Our Dinosaur Diary | |
| President Dinosaur | Brachiosaurus | The Powerpuff Girls | |
| Reptar | Tyrannosaurus rex | Rugrats | Main character of the babies' favourite TV show. It was based on Godzilla. |
| Rex | Tyrannosaurus rex | Toy Story | An excitable large, green, plastic toy who suffers from anxiety, an inferiority complex and the concern that he is not scary enough. He is voiced by Wallace Shawn. |
| Stegmutt | Stegosaurus | Darkwing Duck | |
| T-Bone | Tyrannosaurus | Extreme Dinosaurs | Dinosaurs from the past that were granted immense strength and human capabilities by an interdimensional traveler. They managed to escape the dinosaur extinction and reach modern times with the help of another alien spaceship in chase of the criminal. |
| Bullzeye | Pterodactyl or Pteranodon | Extreme Dinosaurs | Dinosaurs from the past that were granted immense strength and human capabilities by an interdimensional traveler. They managed to escape the dinosaur extinction and reach modern times with the help of another alien spaceship in chase of the criminal. |
| Spike | Triceratops | Extreme Dinosaurs | Dinosaurs from the past that were granted immense strength and human capabilities by an interdimensional traveler. They managed to escape the dinosaur extinction and reach modern times with the help of another alien spaceship in chase of the criminal. |
| Stegz | Stegosaurus | Extreme Dinosaurs | Dinosaurs from the past that were granted immense strength and human capabilities by an interdimensional traveler. They managed to escape the dinosaur extinction and reach modern times with the help of another alien spaceship in chase of the criminal. |
| Hard Rock | Ankylosaurus | Extreme Dinosaurs | Dinosaurs from the past that were granted immense strength and human capabilities by an interdimensional traveler. They managed to escape the dinosaur extinction and reach modern times with the help of another alien spaceship in chase of the criminal. |
| Bad Rap | Velociraptor | Extreme Dinosaurs | Dinosaurs from the past that were granted immense strength and human capabilities by an interdimensional traveler. They managed to escape the dinosaur extinction and reach modern times with the help of another alien spaceship in chase of the criminal. |
| Haxx | Velociraptor | Extreme Dinosaurs | Dinosaurs from the past that were granted immense strength and human capabilities by an interdimensional traveler. They managed to escape the dinosaur extinction and reach modern times with the help of another alien spaceship in chase of the criminal. |
| Spittor | Velociraptor | Extreme Dinosaurs | Dinosaurs from the past that were granted immense strength and human capabilities by an interdimensional traveler. They managed to escape the dinosaur extinction and reach modern times with the help of another alien spaceship in chase of the criminal. |
| Thunderlizards | Parasaurolophus, Styracosaurus, Allosaurus | The Terrible Thunderlizards, Eek! The Cat | A trio of operatives consisting of Doc Tari, Kutter and Squat who make numerous attempts to exterminate humans. |
| Tina Rex | Tyrannosaurus rex | The Amazing World of Gumball | A female T-Rex who is a bully at Elmore Junior High. |
| Todd | Apatosaurus | CollegeHumor | A green male dinosaur. |
| Taury | Tyrannosaurus rex | Harry and His Bucket Full of Dinosaurs | Harry's toy dinosaurs. |
| Trike | Triceratops | Harry and His Bucket Full of Dinosaurs | Harry's toy dinosaurs. |
| Pterence | Pterodactylus | Harry and His Bucket Full of Dinosaurs | Harry's toy dinosaurs. |
| Patsy | Apatosaurus | Harry and His Bucket Full of Dinosaurs | Harry's toy dinosaurs. |
| Sid | Scelidosaurus | Harry and His Bucket Full of Dinosaurs | Harry's toy dinosaurs. |
| Steggy | Stegosaurus | Harry and His Bucket Full of Dinosaurs | Harry's toy dinosaurs. |
| Thunderclap | Nyctosaurus | The Good Dinosaur | |
| Velociraptor | Velociraptor | Arcade Gamer Fubuki | |

== Video games ==
| Name | Species | Game | Notes |
|---|---|---|---|
| Alex | Velociraptor | Tekken | |
| Bartsaurus | Coelophysis | Virtual Bart | |
| Bio Rex | Tyrannosaurus | F-Zero | A bioengineered dinosaur revived from a fossilized egg. One of the playable racers starting in F-Zero X. |
| Tricky | Triceratops | Diddy Kong Racing | |
| Dippy | Diplodocus | Banjo-Tooie | A thirsty dinosaur who lives in a cave in Terrydactyland. |
| Chompasaurus | Elasmosaurus | Banjo-Tooie | A dinosaur who lives in a cave with rivers in Terrydactyland. |
| Scrotty | Styracosaurus | Banjo-Tooie | A dinosaur who lives in a cave with 3 children of her own named Scrat, Scrit and Scrut in Terrydactyland. |
| Mr. Patch, Stomponadon, and T-Rex Banjo | Tyrannosaurus rex | Banjo-Tooie | A balloon T-Rex dinosaur who lives in a circus in Witchyworld and a dinosaur who lives in a cave and mountain in Terrydactyland. |
| Soarasaurus, Terry | Pteranodon | Banjo-Tooie | A dinosaur who lives in a cave and nests in Terrydactyland. |
| Bargasaurus | Stegosaurus | Banjo-Tooie | A dinosaur who lives in Terrydactyland. |
| DinoMighty | Tyrannosaurus | Wario World | Excitement Central's boss that Wario faces on his adventure. |
| Frigi | Apatosaurus | Fossil Fighters and Fossil Fighters: Champions | Full species name is Frigisaurus. Is used as a sub-boss in Fossil Fighters by the boss of the villains of the game, the BB Bandits. Frigi is a legendary Vivosaur with powerful water-based ice attacks. It is available as DLC for Fossil Fighters: Champions and a reward in a side mission by reviving all 100 Vivosaurs in Fossil Fighters. |
| General Scales | Tyrannosaurus | Star Fox | One of the antagonists in Star Fox Adventures. |
| Prince Tricky | Centrosaurus | Star Fox | Prince of dinosaurs. |
| Gon | Gon | Gon | Makes a guest appearance in Tekken 3. |
| Hauzer | Tyrannosaurus rex | Red Earth | A fossil from Savalia, but resurrected by Scion. |
| Igno | Tyrannosaurus | Fossil Fighters and Fossil Fighters: Champions | Full species name is Ignosaurus. Igno is the bitter rival of Frigi and is used by the hero in Fossil Fighters to defeat Frigi in a level where it is the sub-boss of the game. Igno is a legendary Vivosaur with powerful fire-based lava attacks. According to legend in the game, Igno was formed when it fought an Apatosaurus (Frigi), and the power of the two both killed them and fossilized Igno in a pool of lava. Igno is available as DLC in Fossil Fighters: Champions and can be obtained by doing a side quest, which involves beating Saurhead five times. |
| Novaraptor | | Primal Carnage | A fictional species created by combining the genetics of multiple dromaeosaur species. |
| Radical Rex | Tyrannosaurus rex | Radical Rex | A skateboarding, fire-breathing dinosaur. |
| Rex | Tyrannosaurus | Dino City | Protagonists and playable characters of the game. |
| Riptor | Velociraptor | Killer Instinct | An experiment from the company Ultratech to create a human/dinosaur crossbreed. In the 2013 game, she is no longer a single specimen, but rather one of a batch of riptor-type bioweapons. |
| Plessie | Plesiosaurus | Super Mario 3D World | Plessie is a Plesiosaurus who acts as a mount in certain levels. |
| Tops | Protoceratops | Dino City | |
| Dino-Rang | | Skylanders | |
| Slobber Tooth | "Turtle dinosaur" (Ankylosaurus) | Skylanders | |
| Chopper | Tyrannosaurus rex | Skylanders | |
| Tri-Tip | Triceratops | Skylanders | |
| Yoshi | | Mario | Acts as Mario's steed and can swallow items and weak enemies. |

== See also ==
- List of fictional birds
  - List of fictional birds of prey
  - List of fictional ducks
    - In animation
  - List of fictional penguins
