= Itaru =

- Gender: Male

Origin
- Origin: Japanese
- Meaning: Different meanings depending on the kanji used

Itaru (written: 格, 到, 至 or いたる in hiragana) is a masculine Japanese given name. Notable people with the name include:

- Itaru Chimura (千村 格; born 1975), Japanese snowboarder
- Itaru Hashimoto (橋本 到; born 1990), Japanese baseball player
- Itaru Hinoue (樋上 いたる), pseudonym of a female Japanese manga artist
- Itaru Ishida (石田 格; 1979–2013), Japanese Magic: The Gathering player
- Itaru Ishii (石井 至; born 1965), Japanese publisher
- Itaru Kinoshita (木下 いたる), Japanese manga artist
- Itaru Nakamura (中村 格; born 1963), Japanese police bureaucrat
- Itaru Oki (沖 至; 1941–2020), Japanese jazz trumpeter and flugelhornist
- Itaru Tachibana (立花 止; 1903–1954), Japanese spy active in the United States
- Itaru Taniguchi (谷口 到; born 1984), Japanese rugby union player

== Fictional characters ==
- Itaru Chigasaki (茅ヶ崎 至), a character in the video game A3!
- Itaru Hashida (橋田 至), a character in the visual novel Steins;Gate
