= Monica Toy =

- Genre: Adventure; Surreal comedy
- Country of origin: Brazil
- Original language: Gibberish
- No. of seasons: 13
- No. of episodes: 351

Production
- Production companies: Estúdios Mauricio de Sousa; YouTube Studio

Original release
- Network: YouTube; Cartoon Network (Brazil)
- Release: May 23, 2013 – present

Monica Toy is a Brazilian franchise and 2D animated web series based on Monica's Gang comic books, and also a spin-off of the animated cartoon series of the same name. The series features the characters drawn in a chibi-like art style. The franchise debuted on 2013 in partnership with Mauricio de Sousa and the company Tok & Stok for the sale of products based on the characters (like cups and pillows), with a cartoon premiering on the official YouTube channel on May 23 of the same year. The cartoon also debuted on Cartoon Network in Brazil after a few months.

Some apps and games for Android and iOS based on the characters the way they appear in Monica Toy were developed. In 2014, the game Tap Toy was released. In 2015 the game Up Toy was released. In 2018, an avatar creation app was released.

== Animated series ==
Several short episodes are released on the official Monica's Gang YouTube channel since 2013 with each season having 26 episodes. The animation does not use dialogue, although all the sound effects are vocal sounds.

The episodes of the first three seasons are focused only on Monica (with Samson), Jimmy Five, Smudge and Maggy, with some rare appearances of Mauricio de Sousa and Blu since season two. The fourth season introduces the characters Chuck Billy, Zeke and Ma Megg from Chuck Billy 'n' Folks, and Vanilla the Cat. The fifth season introduces Fluffy, Thunder from Lionel's Kingdom, Bug-a-Booo, Skully and Vic Vampire from Bug-a-Booo, Horacio from Horacio's World, Bubbly the Astronaut and Pitheco, Tooga, Zoom and Boom from The Cavern Clan. The sixth season introduces Ant Rita from Lionel's Kingdom, Glu, Rosie Lee from Chuck Billy 'n' Folks, Franklin, Jeremiah, Chauvy the Pig and Ditto. The seventh season introduces Milena, Lorde Coelhão, Nutty Ned, Angel, McFox from Lionel's Kingdom, Sunny and Denise. The eighth season introduces Frank and Moe the Mummy from Bug-a-Booo.

The animation also shows some crossovers in certain episodes with characters like Red and Leonard from The Angry Birds Movie, El Chavo del Ocho, El Chapulín Colorado, Hello Kitty, Astro Boy, D.Va and Lúcio from Overwatch, plus some references to Marvel and DC Comics superheroes and Star Wars.

As of April 2023, the video, Monica Toy | Imitoys #shorts has over 3,5 billion views, making it one of the most watched video uploaded by Monica Toy.
