= Ann James =

Australian artist (born 1952)

Ann James AM
- Born: Ann Catherine Stewart James; 6 October 1952 (age 73); Melbourne, Victoria, Australia
- Occupations: Graphic designer, illustrator, writer
- Writing career
- Genre: Children's picture books

Ann Catherine Stewart James AM (born 6 October 1952) is an Australian illustrator of more than 60 children's books, some of which she also wrote. She was born in Melbourne, Victoria. James has been illustrating books since the 1980s and has become a significant contributor towards the development and appreciation of children's literature in Australia. In 2000 she was awarded the Pixie O'Harris Award as a formal acknowledgment of this contribution and was also the 2002 recipient of the national Dromkeen Medal for services towards children's literature. Ann James still lives and works in Melbourne, where she runs the Books Illustrated gallery and studio that she co-founded with Ann Haddon in 1988.

== Biography ==
Ann James was born in Melbourne, Australia, in October 1952, and grew up in the suburb of Ringwood. She attended Norwood Primary School and Tintern Girls School. Later she earned the Higher Diploma at Melbourne Teachers College. Trained as an arts and crafts teacher, she taught at both Doveton and Ringwood High School in Melbourne, then worked in publications for the Ministry of Education in Victoria. It was here that she began to work as a graphic designer and illustrator of educational publications between 1978 and 1988.

During this time James began freelance illustration of children's books, beginning with A Pet for Mrs Arbuckle, written by Gwenda Smyth, which they entered in a 1981 competition for unpublished writers and illustrators. As her career in books began to take off, (with 14 books published by 1988), James left the Department of Education and co-founded a gallery named Books Illustrated, dedicated to children's book illustration. From this time onwards she has worked towards promoting Australian Children's books, and continued illustrating books from her home in Melbourne, and her country studio, near Castlemaine, Victoria.

== Career ==
Many of James's books have won or been short-listed for the Children's Book Council of Australia book of the year awards, including Bernice Knows Best, by Max Dann, (CBCA Junior Book of the Year, 1984) and Hannah Plus One by Libby Gleeson which won the same award in 1997. Also in 1997, The Midnight Gang, by Margaret Wild, was a CBCA Picture Book of the Year Honor book, and went on to win three Children's Choice awards around Australia. Books short-listed in the CBCA Awards included Dog In, Cat Out, by Gillian Rubinstein; Hannah and the Tomorrow Room, by Libby Gleeson; Looking Out for Sampson, by Libby Hathorn; and Penny Pollard’s Diary and Penny Pollard’s Letters by Robin Klein.

In 1988 Ann James co founded a gallery and studio space in Melbourne called Books Illustrated with fellow book enthusiast Ann Haddon. This gallery has become a center for children's literature and children's book illustration and has exhibited the work of many prominent Australian illustrators including, Terry Denton, Shaun Tan and Leigh Hobbs.

Ann James's illustrative work is part of the permanent collections of the Lu Rees Archives at University of Canberra, the Dromkeen Collection, Fremantle Children's Literature Centre, Seasons Gallery, and the Customs House Gallery.

James was awarded Member of the Order of Australia in the Australia Day 2016 Honours List "for significant service to children's literature as an author and illustrator, and through advocacy roles with literacy and professional bodies".

== Books ==
- A Pet for Mrs Arbuckle, Gwenda Smyth, Thomas Nelson, 1981
- Jo Jo and Mike, Jenny Wagner, Thomas Nelson, 1982
- Bernice Knows Best, Max Dann, 1983 *** (Younger Readers section)
- Penny Pollard's Diary, Robin Klein, Oxford University Press, 1983 (Hodder Headline)
- The ABC of What You Can Be, Sugar & Snails Press, 1984
- Where's my Shoe?, Hazel Edwards, Longman Cheshire, 1984
- Snakes & Ladders, Robin Klein, Dent, 1984 (Allen & Unwin)
- Penny Pollard's Letters, Robin Klein, 1984 (Hodder Headline)
- Dangers and Disasters, various authors, Methuen, 1986
- Penny Pollard in Print, Robin Klein, Oxford University Press, 1986 (Hodder Headline)
- Looking Out for Sampson, Libby Hathorn, Oxford University Press, 1987 (Hodder Headline)
- Sportsmad, Hazel Edwards, Longman, 1987
- Penny Pollard's Passport, Robin Klein, Oxford University Press, 1988 (Hodder Headline)
- Wiggy and Boa, Anna Fienberg, Houghton Mifflin, 1988 (Allen and Unwin)
- A Hobby for Mrs Arbuckle, Gwenda Smyth, Viking, 1989 (reissue, new format)
- One Day: a very first Dictionary, Oxford University Press, 1989 (Hodder Headline)
- Prince Lachlan, Nette Hilton, Omnibus Books, 1989
- Penny Pollard's Guide to Modern Maners, Robin Klein, 1989 (Hodder Headline)
- Beryl & Bertha at the Beach, Pippa MacPherson, Oxford University Press, 1990
- Amy the Indefatigable Autograph Hunter, Judith Worthy, Angus & Robertson, 1990
- First at Last, Julia McClelland, Oxford University Press, 1990 (Hodder Headline)
- Dial-a-Croc, Mike Dumbleton, Omnibus Books 1991
- Dog In, Cat Out, Gillian Rubinstein, Omnibus Books, 1991
- The Ding Dong Daily, Kathleen Hill, Heineman, 1991
- The Ding Dong Daily Extra, Kathleen Hill, Heineman, 1992
- The Backsack Bulletin, Rod Quantock, Mammoth, 1992
- Tangles, Errol Broome, Allen & Unwin, 1993
- Rockhopper, Errol Broome, Allen & Unwin, 1994
- Snap!, Margaret Ballinger, Houghton Mifflin (US), 1994
- Jessica Joan, Wendy Orr, Heineman, 1994
- Skating on Sand, Libby Gleeson, Penguin, 1994
- Madeline the Mermaid and other Fishy Tales, Anna Fienberg, Allen & Unwin, 1995
- The Butterfly, Roger Vaughan Carr, Random House, 1996
- Making Pictures: techniques for illustrating Children's Books, Ann Haddon, Scholastic 1996
- Hannah Plus One, Libby Gleeson, Penguin, 1996
- Dead Sailors don't Bite, Anna Fienberg. Little Ark, 1996
- The Midnight Gang, Margaret Wild, Omnibus, 1996
- Pidge, Krista Bell, Allen & Unwin, 1997
- Dog Star, Janeen Brian, Omnibus Books, 1997
- After Dusk, Ted Greenwood, Penguin, 1997
- A Coat of Cats, Jeri Kroll, Lothian Books, 1998
- Elephant's Lunch, Kate Walker, Omnibus Books, 1998
- Magnus Maybe, Errol Broome, Allan & Unwin, 1998
- Lizzy & Smiley, Julia McClelland, Penguin, 1999
- The Midnight Feast, Margaret Wild, ABC Books, 1999
- Penny Pollard's Scrapbook, Robin Klein, Hodder Headline, 1999
- Penny Pollard's Diary, Robin Klein, Hodder Headline, 1999 (reissue, new format)
- Penny Pollard's Passport, Robin Klein, Hodder Headline, 1999 (reissue, new format)
- Penny Pollard in Print, Robin Klein, Hodder Headline, 1999 (reissue, new format)
- Penny Pollard's Letters, Robin Klein, Hoddet Headline, 1999 (reissue, new format)
- Penny Pollard's Guide to Modern Manners, Robin Klein, Hodde Headline, 1999 (reissue, new format)
- Hannah & the Tomorrow Room, Libby Gleeson, Penguin, 1999
- Baby, Tania Cox, Working Titles Press, 2000
- Missing Mem, Errol Broome, Allen & Unwin, 2000
- Jessica Joan, Wendy Orr, Koala Books (reissue, new format, new publisher), 2000
- The Mermaid's Tail, Raewyn Caisley, Penguin Books, 2001
- Shutting the Chooks In, Libby Gleeson, Scholastic, 2003
- Shoo Cat, Ian Bone, Omnibus Books, 2003
- Little Humpty, Margaret Wild, Little Hare Books, 2003
- Jessie & Mr Smith, Jane Godwin, Penguin, 2003
- Hannah the Famous, Libby Gleeson, Penguin Books, 2004
- The Way I Love You, David Bedford, Little Hare Books, 2004
- Muscles, Hazel Edwards, Lothian Books, 2005
- Tai's Penguin, Raewyn Caisley, Penguin Books, 2006
- Ready, Set, Skip!, Jane O'Connor, Penguin Books, US, 2007. Penguin Books Australia, 2007
- Lucy Goosey, Margaret Wild, Little Hare Books, October 2007
- Audrey of the Outback, Christine Harris, Little Hare Books, 2008
- Audrey Goes to Town, Christine Harris, Little Hare Books, 2008
- Sadie & Ratz, Sonya Hartnett, Penguin Books, 2008
- I'm A Dirty Dinosaur, Janeen Brian, Penguin Books, 2013 ISBN 9780670076154
- I’m A Hungry Dinosaur, Janeen Brian, Penguin Books, 2015 ISBN 9780670078103
