= Primitive War =

2025 Australian film

- Official release poster
- Directed by: Luke Sparke
- Written by: Luke Sparke
- Based on: Primitive War by Ethan Pettus
- Produced by: Carmel Imrie; Carly Sparke; Luke Sparke
- Starring: Ryan Kwanten; Tricia Helfer; Nick Wechsler; Jeremy Piven
- Cinematography: Wade Muller
- Edited by: Luke Sparke
- Music by: Frederik Wiedmann
- Production company: Sparke Films
- Distributed by: Rialto Distribution
- Release dates: 11 August 2025 (Sydney); 21 August 2025 (Australia)
- Running time: 133 minutes
- Country: Australia
- Language: English
- Budget: $7 million
- Box office: $1.2 million

Primitive War is a 2025 Australian science fiction horror film directed by Luke Sparke and based on the 2017 novel of the same name by Ethan Pettus. Starring Ryan Kwanten, Tricia Helfer, Nick Wechsler and Jeremy Piven, the film is set in a Vietnam jungle valley during 1968 and follows a reconnaissance unit who carries out a rescue mission for a US Army Special Forces platoon and are attacked by de-extinct dinosaurs.

A sequel is in development, planned for a 2027 release. On August 4, 2026 Ethan Pettus announced he had terminated his contract for the sequel and would no longer be involved in any future projects.

== Plot ==
In 1968, during the Vietnam War, a Green Beret platoon is attacked and killed in a remote jungle valley by unknown predators while on a classified mission. Their commander, Colonel Jericho, calls in Vulture Squad, a LRRP team consisting of team leader Sergeant First Class Ryan Baker, second-in-command Sergeant Xavier Wise, rookie radio operator Leon Verne, former Air Cavalry soldiers Eli Taylor and Charlie Miller, and snipers Gerald Keyes and Logan Stovall, to find the missing Green Berets.

After the Vultures are airdropped into the valley, they begin their search for the Green Berets, finding birdlike tracks and huge feathers from an unknown animal. Baker is attacked by an unseen creature, but drives it away. As the Vultures follow the Green Berets' trail through a cave tunnel, they are ambushed by a pack of Deinonychus; they escape but Baker and Verne become separated in the chaos. Meanwhile, the squad is tracked by a Soviet team called the Dogs of War, consisting of Tolstoy, Nikita, Sergei, Aleksandr, and Con Nhen, a Vietnamese guerrilla fighter. During their search, Aleksandr is ambushed and killed by the creature that attacked Baker.

After encountering and fleeing from a family of Tyrannosaurus rex, Baker and Verne are rescued by Sofia Wagner, a Soviet paleontologist, who takes them to her hideout at an abandoned research station. She explains that a science experiment overseen by USSR General Grigory Borodin accidentally brought a variety of dinosaur species into the valley, and that Borodin murdered her husband and coworkers for questioning him. As they search for the remaining men, Sofia identifies Baker's attacker as a larger, more dangerous species of raptor. The rest of Vulture Squad are attacked by the Dogs of War, with Keyes being shot in the leg. The fight is then interrupted by a flock of Quetzalcoatlus, which kill Tolstoy. Both squads flee, and the Vultures meet up with Baker, Verne, and Sofia before being attacked by the Deinonychus pack, which drag Keyes away. He fights them off but is fatally wounded by a larger raptor. Despite his injuries, Keyes manages to stab its eye and is rescued by the Vultures. After fending off another attack by the raptors, the squad escapes by boat, but a dying Keyes stays behind and uses grenades in a last stand against the raptors.

Sofia explains that Borodin's project is a particle collider that can create wormholes, intended to allow Soviet military forces to teleport anywhere in the world, and that a malfunction during its first test opened a wormhole that transported the dinosaurs to the present day. She convinces the Vultures to disable it, fearing global destruction. Baker contacts Jericho for extraction, but Jericho demands the collider stay intact until troops arrive to capture it. The squad are attacked by more Deinonychus, and Stovall sacrifices himself to save the others. At the Soviet base, Borodin's soldiers kill an infant T-rex, provoking its parents to attack.

As the tyrannosaurs massacre the Soviet soldiers, Vulture Squad plants explosives around the collider, while Baker and Sofia recruit a disillusioned Nikita and Sergei. Miller is attacked by Con Nhen, but kills her and himself by detonating his explosives. The tyrannosaurs leave with their chicks, while Sofia deactivates the collider. Jericho arrives with US reinforcements as a large pack of raptors attack, killing Borodin, Nikita, and Taylor, before Baker sacrifices himself to hold them off. Sofia, Verne, Xavier, and Sergei join Jericho's forces to fight off the raptors and a flock of Quetzalcoatlus, and escape as Vulture Squad's explosives destroy the collider. Jericho regrets the destruction, blaming the Vultures for losing the collider as it could turn the tide of the Cold War in favor of the US, but Sofia warns him that the damage is already done, as the dinosaurs have begun migrating out of the valley.

== Cast ==
- Ryan Kwanten as Sergeant First Class Ryan Baker
- Tricia Helfer as Sofia Wagner
- Nick Wechsler as Eli Taylor
- Jeremy Piven as Colonel Amadeus Jericho
- Anthony Ingruber as Gerald Keyes
- Jeremy Lindsay Taylor as General Grigory Borodin
- Ana Thu Nguyen as Con Nhen
- Aaron Glenane as Logan Stovall
- Carlos Sanson as Leon Verne
- Albert Mwangi as Charlie Miller
- Adolphus Waylee as Sergeant Xavier Wise
- Henry Nixon as Bishop
- Marcus Johnson as Ibex

== Production ==
In February 2022, it was announced that Sparke Films had secured the rights to a film adaptation of the 2017 novel Primitive War: Opiate Undertow by Ethan Pettus, who helped co-write the film's script. Luke Sparke was announced to be directing the film. He pitched the film to multiple Hollywood film studios, but was rejected by each one because they considered the pitch to be too similar to the Jurassic World franchise. He ultimately began developing the film independently with a budget of around $7 million.

In April 2024, Ryan Kwanten, Tricia Helfer, Nick Wechsler, and Jeremy Piven were cast as the film's leads. Filming took place on the Gold Coast, Queensland.

First look images and a poster of the film were released by Collider in August 2024. Speaking on why he chose to adapt the Primitive War novel into a film, Sparke stated, "I was captivated by the imagery surrounding Ethan’s book and the story it told. I’ve worked hard on capturing that essence but also the grittiness, horror aspects and military edge. My vision is to feel like the characters have walked out of the film Platoon and into the jaws of the greatest predators the planet has ever known."

== Release ==
Before its theatrical release, Primitive War headlined a panel at San Diego Comic-Con in July 2025, marking the first time an Australian film was a panel headliner at the convention.

Primitive War was theatrically released by Rialto Distribution in Australia on 21 August 2025. The film received a limited theatrical release on the same day in the United States by Fathom Entertainment.

Primitive War had a limited release in the United Kingdom and Ireland on 28 November 2025, with Signature Entertainment distributing the release.

== Reception ==
On the review aggregator website Rotten Tomatoes, 60% of 25 critics' reviews are positive.

Peter Gray of The AU Review gave 2 out of 5 stars, noting that the film takes itself too seriously with apparent focus on characters, which makes this "intentionally nonsensical" story less enjoyable. For The Guardian, Leslie Felperin rated it 3/5 stars, writing that "there’s a cheerful cheesy gleefulness that motors the movie along."

The film has been viewed by critics as a B-movie counterpart to Jurassic World Rebirth.

== See also ==
- List of films featuring dinosaurs
