= Primitive War: Opiate Undertow =

2017 novel by Ethan Pettus

- Author: Ethan Pettus
- Audio read by: Wayne June
- Cover artist: Justin Trevor Comley
- Language: English
- Series: Primitive War
- Genre: Science fiction; horror
- Publisher: CreateSpace Independent Publishing Platform
- Publication date: April 22, 2017
- Pages: 425
- ISBN: 978-1-545-50074-3
- Followed by: Primitive War Dispatches Volume I: The Hunting of Stalker Force
- Website: theprimitivewar.com

Primitive War: Opiate Undertow, originally released as Primitive War in early editions, is a 2017 self-published debut novel by American writer Ethan Pettus. The novel follows a group of American soldiers who encounter de-extinct dinosaurs in a jungle valley in Vietnam in 1968. It is the first book in the Primitive War series, and spawned a 2025 film of the same name.

== Plot summary ==
In 1968, in a jungle valley in Vietnam, a group of Green Berets led by Kendrick Anderson are ambushed, killed and eaten by unknown predators. Elsewhere, a pair of MACV-SOG agents codenamed Bishop and Ibex are alerted to a cache of barrels containing radioactive waste known as Polonium-T. Contacting General Jericho, they are informed that these shipments were what Anderson’s squad were tracking on Jericho's behalf. With Anderson's squad missing, Jericho recommends sending in Vulture Squad, a recon unit that specializes in rescuing war prisoners from Viet Cong and North Vietnamese Army prison camps.

Vulture Squad, consisting of Captain Ryan Baker, second-in-command Xavier Wise, rookie demolitions expert Leon Verne, marines Eli Taylor and Charlie Miller, and snipers Gerald Keyes and Logan Stovall, is called in by Jericho and given the mission of finding Anderson's missing platoon. Simultaneously, at the far end of the valley, USSR General Grigory Borodin, working on a Particle Collider for his country's government, has become aware of the Americans' presence. He sends a squad of Spetznaz soldiers known as the Dogs of War to hunt down and kill the Americans.

The Vulture Squad searches for the Green Berets, finding tracks and huge feathers belonging to an unknown animal. The group is ambushed by a predator, which they drive off. The squad presses on, unsure of what attacked them, before bedding down in a clearing for the night. The Soviet soldiers are ambushed by the same creature as they investigate the Americans' gunfire, which kills one of their men. Thinking the Americans are responsible, the Soviets vow revenge.

Meanwhile, Xavier spots predators in the trees while keeping watch, which are driven off by a larger creature that he hides from and recognizes as a Tyrannosaurus rex. Xavier, Ryan, and Leon escape from the Tyrannosaurus and its mate by falling off a cliff into a river. Ryan and Leon are rescued by a Soviet scientist, Andrei Wynn, who takes them to his hideout in an abandoned research station. Andre reveals that he was responsible for the presence of dinosaurs in the valley, having accidentally brought them there by opening a wormhole via the particle collider that Borodin is rebuilding. He explains the unseen predators to be Utahraptors. Ryan radios for help and negotiates an evacuation for his men in exchange for intel on the collider. He, Leon, and Andrei then set out to rescue the rest of Vulture Squad.

Meanwhile, the others survive a stampede of Stygimoloch being chased by Deinonychus. Gerald fights off multiple Deinonychus before being ambushed by a Utahraptor. He is wounded before being rescued by Logan and the reunited Vulture Squad. The squad returns to Andrei's research station, where they are attacked by the Utahraptor pack. During their escape to the helicopter, the raptors attack again, wounding Leon and nearly tearing Gerald in half before Logan mercy-kills him. The Tyrannosaurus returns as they escape in the helicopter, and a near-miss from a rocket launched by Viet Cong soldier Con Nhen knocks Miller and local trainee Nguyen out, and they are promptly captured by the Viet Cong.

Simultaneously, the Soviet squad is also attacked by Quetzalcoatlus and their leader is devoured. Vulture Squad returns to Jericho, where Leon is taken into surgery. Ryan comforts Logan and confronts Jericho, demanding reinforcements to mount a rescue mission and to stop Borodin. Andrei reveals to Ryan and Jericho that the Collider is meant for making antimatter that can be used to create radiation-free nuclear weapons, and that its continued use might result in a black hole. Vulture Squad sets out to rescue Miller by boat, with Leon remaining behind to recover. En route, they encounter a herd of Triceratops, which are attacked by Kaprosuchus. Logan sacrifices himself to draw the Kaprosuchus away and is eaten alive. Meanwhile, Miller, having been tortured by Con Nhen, escapes, frees Nguyen, kills Con Nhen and his forces, and destroys the Viet Cong base and its Polonium-T shipments in a suicide attack just before Vulture Squad can rescue him.

Back at Jericho's base, a pair of Quetzalcoatlus attack, killing nearly everyone except for Leon, which the remaining members of the Soviet squad use as a diversion to capture and kidnap Jericho. Despite Leon's injuries, he and Bishop's squad use Vulture Squad's helicopter to pick up the team and head to the Soviet base. The Soviets are attacked by the Tyrannosaurus parents after their soldiers kill one of their chicks. Borodin flees as his base and men are ravaged by the theropods, who then chase after him. Ryan rallies his team to rescue Jericho. When the squad arrive at the Soviet base, they find it destroyed. Bishop's team is killed by scavenging Utahraptors. The Soviet soldier Sergei, wanting to prevent the collider's further use, helps prime it to explode. Ryan dies fighting a Utahraptor, giving his men enough time to escape, while a dying Sergei sets off the explosives and destroys the collider. Borodin, running away from the Tyrannosaurus parents, is ambushed by the surviving Utahraptors, and is eaten alive by their chicks when he is taken back to their nest.

A year later, Leon has been sent stateside on a college scholarship, Eli is the new Captain of Vulture Squad, and Xavier is now the commander of Stalker Force with Andrei joining him. Their goal is to contain the dinosaurs in the Valley and to exterminate the Utahraptors. The other dinosaurs in the valley, including the Tyrannosaurus parents, are contained behind a perimeter of concrete and electric fence. However, Stalker Force find the final Utahraptor nesting ground abandoned, as it is revealed the raptors have found a way to escape.

== Dinosaur accuracy ==
Primitive War has been celebrated for its scientifically informed dinosaur designs; the Deinonychus and Utahraptor, for example, are covered in feathers. There is a heavy amount of speculation within the behavior and appearances, however. Kaprosuchus, for example, does not have any leg material preserved, so the depiction as long-legged pursuit predators is not completely known. The Quetzalcoatlus tongue, used as an extra appendage, is also speculation, as well as the then-popular depiction of Tyrannosaurus covered in grizzled feathers. Of course, these are things that are not known completely, and speculation within paleoart or paleo media is healthy. The inclusion of Stygimoloch as a separate genus is somewhat different, as it has been synonymous with a contemporaneous animal, Pachycephalosaurus, for many years.

== Sequels ==
Multiple sequels have thus far been created for the Primitive War franchise, with three published and more on the way according to Ethan Pettus himself. The first sequel, titled The Primitive War Dispatches: The Hunting of Stalker Force, was published in 2019. The next sequel, Primitive War II: Animus Infernal, which takes place during the Angolan War of Independence, was published in 2020. A third book, titled The Primitive War Dispatches Volume II: The Psalms of Xipetotec, was released in May 2025. The third book takes place between the events of The Hunting of Stalker Force and Primitive War II. A book titled Primitive War: Aeon Ourobouros, is also being written, along with Primitive War Dispatches 3 and 4. A field guide written by Pettus and illustrated by Bruno Hernandez regarding the creatures of the first book and the first volume of the Primitive War Dispatches, titled The Primitive War Bestiary, was also published, and a comic adaption, illustrated by Babisu Kourtis, is actively being worked on.

== Film adaptation ==
In February 2022, it was announced that Sparke Films and its founder, Luke Sparke, had secured the rights to a film adaptation of the novel, with Ethan Pettus helping co-write the film's script. Luke Sparke was announced to be directing the film. He pitched the film to multiple Hollywood film studios, but was rejected by each one because they considered the pitch to be too similar to the Jurassic World franchise. He ultimately began developing the film independently with a budget of around $7 million.

In April 2024, Ryan Kwanten, Tricia Helfer, Nick Wechsler, and Jeremy Piven were cast as the film's leads. Filming took place on the Gold Coast, Queensland.

First look images and a poster of the film were released by Collider in August 2024. When interviewed on why he chose to adapt the Primitive War novel into a film, Sparke stated, "I was captivated by the imagery surrounding Ethan’s book and the story it told. I’ve worked hard on capturing that essence but also the grittiness, horror aspects and military edge. My vision is to feel like the characters have walked out of the film Platoon and into the jaws of the greatest predators the planet has ever known."

Primitive War was theatrically released by Rialto Distribution in Australia on 21 August 2025. The film received a limited theatrical release on the same day in the United States by Fathom Entertainment.
