= Itaru Kinoshita =

Japanese artist

Itaru Kinoshita 木下いたる
- Area: Animal manga
- Notable works: Dinosaur Sanctuary

Itaru Kinoshita (木下 いたる) is a Japanese manga artist. His career started with the dinosaur focused manga Giganto o ute (Attack the Gigante). His series Dinosan has been in serialization since 2021 with Shinchosha. And since 2022, the English edition has been published by Seven Seas Entertainment as Dinosaur Sanctuary.

== Career ==
During elementary school Itaru used to help take care of livestock. He has also stated that he has liked dinosaurs since childhood. He grew up watching the film Jurassic Park.

Since his early school days, he liked to draw which led him to continue his education at an art high school. However, when graduation approached, he had no desire to pursue art academically and lacked any particular goal. Inspired by a brochure for a language school given to him by his parents, he decided to go to the US after graduating high school to study film, especially Hollywood films. However, even after moving to the US, he found it difficult to find a job in the film industry, so he contacted make-up artist AKIHITO and animation artist Daisuke Tsutsumi for advice.

After consulting with AKIHITO and Daisuke Tsutsumi, Itaru realized that his own goals were still vague and began thinking that it would be better to make a living doing something that he enjoyed doing. He had already started writing comics while they in the US and gradually shifted his career from film to comics. Later, around 2011, Itaru worked in Palau as a start-up staff member of a Japanese restaurant. The flat Kinoshita was living in at the time was adjacent to a forest and the strange animal noises coming from the forest at night inspired him to create a manga about dinosaurs; specifically about breeding and taking care of dinosaurs, which he thought was not well depicted in the film franchise Jurassic Park.

After returning to Japan, Itaru worked at a movie theater to earn money while trying to become a manga artist and won several manga awards. However, his proposals were repeatedly unsuccessful and rejected by publishers. He has stated that this was a very rough period for him. He also found it difficult to incorporate dinosaurs into his stories, and his projects did not progress smoothly. Itaru planned to give up if he could not serialize his work by the time he turned thirty years old, and had his sights set on a job. However, just before he turned thirty, he saw signs of his first serialization and continued as a manga artist. In June 2018 Kodansha's COMIC DAYS serialized his dinosaur action manga set in the Edo period titled Giganto o ute. The first tankōbon volume was released in November of the same year.

After the serialization of Giganto o ute ended, he created another manga about dinosaurs. This time, the story was set in modern times and revolved around the care and breeding of dinosaurs in a zoo—an idea he had originally envisioned while working in Palau. Thus the world of Dinosaur Sanctuary was created thanks to Shinchosha, which began its serialization in their monthly manga magazine Comic Bunch, from March 2021—and digitally since 2024 on their online platform Comic Bunch Kai—with the physical publication of volume 1 in tankōbon format seeing a September release of the same year.

Since 2024, he has been participating in the Manga International Network Team (MINT) Project. Through this project he spoke at Anime Expo 2025 in Los Angeles, California where much of the MINT booth was dedicated to showcasing Dinosaur Sanctuary. Shortly afterward, he also made an appearance at California College of the Arts in San Francisco to give a special talk.

== Works ==
=== Serialized ===
- Giganto o ute (Attack the Gigante), Kodansha, 2018–2019, 3 vols.
- Dinosaur Sanctuary, Shinchosha, 2021–ongoing. (Also published in English, Basque, Spanish, French, Portuguese, Chinese, Thai, and Vietnamese)

=== Children's Books ===
- Dinosan ehon kyoryuen e iko (Dinosaur Sanctuary Picture Book: Let's Go to the Dinosaur Park), Shinchosha, 2025.

=== Illustrations ===
- Promotional illustrations for Masters of the Universe (2026, Japan Release)
- Promotional illustrations for Avatar: Fire and Ash (2025, Japan Release)
- Promotional illustrations for Predator: Badlands (2025, Japan Release)

=== Contributions ===
- Zarigazami kaiju in Monstrous: The Kaiju Issue, Monstrous Books, 2026.
