= Dinosaur Sanctuary =

Japanese manga series

- Cover of the first volume

ディノサン (Dinosan)
- Genre: Science fiction; Slice of life
- Manga
- Written by: Itaru Kinoshita
- Published by: Shinchosha
- English publisher: NA: Seven Seas Entertainment
- Imprint: Bunch Comics
- Magazine: Monthly Comic Bunch (March 2021–March 2024); Comic Bunch Kai (April 2024–present)
- Original run: March 19, 2021 – present
- Volumes: 9

Dinosaur Sanctuary (Japanese: ディノサン, Hepburn: Dinosan) is a Japanese manga series written and illustrated by Itaru Kinoshita, with paleontologist Dr. Shin-ichi Fujiwara serving as research consultant. It began serialization in Shinchosha's Monthly Comic Bunch magazine in March 2021; in April 2024, its serialization was transferred to Comic Bunch Kai. As of June 2026, nine volumes have been released.

== Plot ==
In a world where dinosaurs were rediscovered in 1946, Suma Suzume works in Enoshima Dinoland, a struggling dinosaur park where she takes care of many dinosaurs and faces many challenges.

== Characters ==
=== Enoshima Dinoland staff and keepers ===
Suzume Suma (須磨 すずめ, Suma Suzume)
A rookie dinokeeper at the Enoshima Dinoland dinosaur park and the main character. Her love of dinosaurs stems from her father, Ichirou, who was a scientist responsible for bringing certain extinct species back through genetics. After a fatal incident ruined her father's career and drove him to suicide, Suma lost her interest in dinosaurs which she regained when she remembered the happiness they brought her when she was growing up. She aspires to be able to bridge the gap between humans and dinosaurs and reignite the dying passion people had with dinosaurs.
Arata Kaidou (海堂 新, Kaidō Arata)
An experienced dinokeeper who specializes in the parks theropods. Kaidou worked at Enoshima Dinoland for over 15 years under another dinokeeper Yamaga before a tragic incident involving Ichigo, the park's Allosaurus, resulted in the death of both Yamaga and the dinosaur. Since then, Kaidou became stricter with rules and regulations to prevent any further incidents. Despite his more aloof personality, Kaidou does still love his job and cares for those he works for and with. He is Suma's primary overseer. Prior to being a dinokeeper, Arata was set to inherit his father's construction business, but choose to pursue his dreams and was disowned.
Karin Kirishima
The park's ceratopsian keeper. Kirishima worked at another dinosaur park with the Triceratops, Masaru. However, when Masaru broke his horn and lost popularity to the point of selling him to Enoshima Dinoland, Kirishima left to continue working with him. She has a sisterly attitude towards Suma, both working hard to make an interactive display to boost Masaru's popularity.
Takatoshi Ogino
Enoshima Dinoland's chief curator and manager. Mild-mannered and gentle, Ogino is determined to keep the park running despite its relatively poor state. He has, however, clashed with Kirishima when his superiors decided to sell Masaru the Triceratops for more funds, something he was reluctant about. He gladly convinced them otherwise when Kirishima and Suma worked together to make an interactive display, which proved to be successful after an online influencer posted online about it.
Ami Torikai
Enoshima Dinoland's accountant and office manager working beneath Ogino. She is usually seen wearing a dinosaur hat, a jumpsuit, and barefooted. She keeps to herself on her laptop, keeping track of the park's finances and online media presence.
Ren Shiranui
The veterinarian of the park. He primarily works with his assistant Nakajou. Despite being attractive and caring towards his dinosaur patients, he is distant towards people and can be seen as spiteful, blaming certain health problems dinosaurs have from genetic tampering done in the labs. He also states to hate people who have goals but no way of achieving them, believing Suma to be one such person. He does start warming up to her after she helped with the park's Pachycephalosaurus after he experiences slight pneumonia.
Keisuke Igarashi
The park's stegosaur and pachycephalosaur keeper. He used to work at another dinosaur park that specialized in marine reptiles like mosasaurs and ichthyosaurs called Blue World years prior to the story. He grew attached the park's Globidens Sophia, but left and joined Enoshima Dinoland. He is boisterous and something of a smooth-talker, easily getting along with Suma due to their mutual love of dinosaurs and parallels in their trainee experiences. He has butted heads with Shiranui due to their clashing personalities, though will work together for the sake of the dinosaurs.
Shougo Katase
A keeper who works primarily with the park's ankylosaurs, though certain theropods like the Citipati pair are under his care. He is relatively new to his position due to his predecessor quitting. He is put under constant pressure, though hides it with a stone face. He is methodical in his work and strict with his rules.
Harue Katou
The park's ornithopod keeper. She is motherly and caring. She is also excited to see baby dinosaurs, hoping that the Centrosaurus will breed and earn the park an award.
Makabe Kazuya
The park's plesiosaur keeper. He is shown to be something of a cynic, believing that people are not interested in the educational aspect of the park and only go to see cool dinosaurs.
Fuzuki Hayashi
The park's pterosaur keeper. She is a hard person to read and rarely shows expressions. Despite this, Hayashi works hard for the park's aviary and has worked on a number of items and exhibits for the park. She does not necessarily love the animals she works with, but her interest in them shines through and she cares deeply for them
Hoshino Kurumi
The park's sauropod keeper. She has a youthful demeanor and can act childish. She loves helping those around her, be it her fellow keepers or the dinosaurs she cares for like Momo the Camarasaurus.
Ryuuji Kazama
A keeper who works for the park's unusual dinosaurs, meaning he takes care of dinosaurs with special needs. He also looks over the Psittacosaurus and helps with some vet work when needed. He's shown to be patient and understanding, taking his time to help others understand and educate the dinosaurs he looks after.

=== Enoshima Dinoland's dinosaurs and other animals ===
Yuuki
The park's Giganotosaurus. Despite being a predatory dinosaur, she's actually pretty skittish and cautious. She's so easily frightened, she was scared away by a pigeon that got into her exhibit. She is also described as needy and pampered.
Niko & Vena
The park's pair of Troodon. They have mated and laid a clutch of eggs, four of which hatch. Niko was the first dinosaur Suma worked hands on with, helping Kaidou and Kirishima when he was suffering from a combination of heat stroke and a blocked throat. The runt of the clutch, Benkei, was placed under Suma's care before he was sent to the Chofu Paleoorganism Research Institute to be cared for and transferred once he is at the right age. The other three remain under their parents' care. Suma visited Benkei at the institute and noted his intelligence while the dinosaur remembered her and came to her at the sound of her voice.
Masaru
The park's Triceratops. He belonged to another dinosaur park where he was the star dinosaur, even being the basis for a character in a dinosaur movie. Unfortunately, his popularity was shot when he accidentally broke his left horn after he got it stuck. He became the source of ridicule and mockery afterwards. He was sold to Enoshima Dinoland in hopes of bringing people to the smaller park, though Kirishima believes it was to save face for the bigger park. He was nearly sold to another park when he did not bring the crowds, but through Kirishima and Suma's hard work, they were able to make a display out of Masaru's broken horn, which gained popularity when an influencer talked about it online.
Roy
The park's Dilophosaurus. Due to his species being brought back through genetics rather than being part of the lost world most dinosaurs came from, Roy suffers from a number of health problems like gout. Despite this, he still lives a good life at the park.
Daikichi, Shoukichi, & Umeko
The park's trio of Centrosaurus. Umeko is the sole female of the group and the reason Daikichi and Shoukichi spar. In one bout, Shoukichi was able to win and pair up with Umeko. This has resulted in Daikichi being moved to another exhibit and hopes of breeding some baby Centrosaurus. Umeko experienced bone cancer and almost had her leg amputated but was able to get alternative treatment that proved effective.
Hanako
The park's sole Tyrannosaurus. She briefly appears in a flashback in the first chapter. When she is formally introduced, the park is celebrating her 36th birthday. Because of her age, she does not move around as much and rarely goes on display. She's developed cataracts in her left eye and her hearing has dulled due to her age. Despite this, she still lives a good life at the park.
Eiger
The park's Spinosaurus. He is described as being hot-headed, though is a popular attraction at the park. Because of his temperament, he sometimes misses his catches.
Hachibei
The park's Pachycephalosaurus. He was paired with a female named Daisy, though she died before the start of the manga. For a short time, his sleep was interrupted by water splashing down from a clogged gutter, which caused him to drowsily bump his nose to the wall while pacing. This led to a case of pneumonia when his nostrils got reshaped by an infection caused by nasal catarrh. Fortunately, Suma was able to catch it early enough to have Hachibei examined and healed. He continues to sleep in a spot he shared with Daisy.
Momiji
The park's Stegosaurus. She used to live in an exhibit of her own, but was swapped with Daikichi while Shoukichi and Umeko were prepped for breeding. She currently lives with the Camarasaurus, Plateosaurus, and Thescelosaurus. She gained some online popularity when a picture of her made it look like she was smiling.
Ayaka, Fuuka, Nia, & Norika
The park's small herd of Pinacosaurus. Nia is the sole male of the group and the father of five babies, Ayaka being the mother. Each member of the herd are picky about what they eat, so their main keeper, Katase, divides the food evenly to their liking. The babies are transferred to another park.
Kaka & Kuku
The park's pair of Citipati. Kuku is the skittish of the two, refusing to go to her crate even with the promise of food. The two currently live with the Pinacosaurus herd.
Dekopin, Mango, Parimo, Perry, Polo, Pyou, Spoon, & Tori
The park's flock of Pterodaustro that reside in the aviary. Polo was injured by Pyou after trying to steal her food and was treated by Suma. The experience scared Polo to the point of not feeding herself, though Suma helps her recover.
Trom
The park's Deinonychus and a "special dinosaur," meaning he is disabled and cannot be on display. Specifically, he's completely blind. He's noted as being a nervous animal and can get spooked easily. Suma initially pity's him due to his blindness, but comes to understand his quality of life and that he is happy despite his disability.
Azuki and other Psittacosaurus
Seen a couple times in the story. The park has a small herd in an interactive petting area. They became part of a live stream that went viral and caused an increase in guests. One of them, Azuki, is shown to be a heavy sleeper. Suma placed a camera on Azuki for an event that she streamed on Dinoland's social media.
Momo
The park's Camarasaurus. She is the park sole sauropod. She's a messy and gluttonous eater, constantly making a mess. She lives in the biggest exhibit with Shoukichi, Umeko, Momiji, a flock of Thescelosaurus, and a group of Plateosaurus. After a slight influx of visitors, she ate some litter that got into her exhibit and got constipated, losing her appetite in the process. She receives an enema from Shiranui and is back to normal after her treatment.
Unnamed Protoceratops
Seen a couple times in the story. The park has at least two.
Unnamed Deinocheirus
Seen a couple times in the story. Only one is seen.
Unnamed Plateosaurus
Seen a couple times in the story. One is barely seen, but dialogue indicates there is more.
Unnamed Thescelosaurus
Seen a couple times in the story. Three could be seen in certain panels.
Unnamed Edmontosaurus
At least one Edmontosaurus regalis has been seen, though others may call the park home. A group of kids mistook them for Parasaurolophus, but were corrected.
Unnamed Pterodactylus
A flock resides in the aviary. At least seven are seen flying around and climbing a cliff while Suma and Hayashi talk.
Unnamed Rhamphorhynchus
A small flock live in the aviary. At least three call the park home. They have a saltwater pool that they feed from, eating fish, squid, and shrimp.
Unnamed Ctenochasma
A flock live in the aviary. Though Suma works with Hayashi and the pterosaurs, the Ctenochasma are not visited with focus going to the Pterodaustro.
Halszkaraptor
Unseen and unnamed, but confirmed to be a part of the park according to the map.
Futabasaurus
Unseen and unnamed, but confirmed to be a part of the park according to the map.

=== Other dinosaurs and prehistoric animals ===
Ichigo
Enoshima Dinoland's Allosaurus. She was under the care of Kaidou and Yamaga 15 years before the beginning of the story. She was shy and easily frightened. Due to Yamaga ignoring the buddy system and a minor construction incident, Ichigo got frightened and killed Yamaga before trying to escape. Though she got caught by the gate, the pressure injured her ribs and made her sounds of pain scare the crowds. Ichigo was euthanized by a shot to the head, but the incident caused a domino effect that is felt throughout the story.
Sophia
Blue World's Globidens. The survivor of a c-section after her mother's untimely death, Sophia was a popular attraction at the park. As she aged, however, her popularity waned. Before working at Enoshima Dinoland, Igarashi was one of Sophia's keepers.
Unnamed Ichthyosaurs
Blue World had a tank of unidentified ichthyosaurs. Sophia was placed into their tank as a pup with little risk to either since the ichthyosaurs are primarily fish eaters and Sophia eats mollusks rather than bigger animals.
Unnamed Plesiosaurs
Blue World has at least one species of plesiosaur, though the identity of it is unknown. Another species, or possibly the same, was seen at the Chofu Paleoorganism Research Institute.
Velociraptor
The result of illegal breeding, a Velociraptor was smuggled into Kamakura from Yokohama before it escaped to a nearby shrine. Due to being captively bred and raised by humans, there was concern about it getting too close to humans and harming someone. Suma and Arata worked with local law enforcement to capture it and bring it to the Chofu Paleoorganism Research Institute.
Diplodocus
Several could be seen at an Australian dinosaur preserve called Australo National Dino Park. They were placed in the preserve as an experiment and seem to be acclimating well.
Lambeosaurus
Herds of Lambeosaurus are seen at the Australo National Dino Park. Sexual dimorphism is seen with males having bigger crests than the females.
Chasmosaurus
A pair are seen at the Australo National Dino Park, though plenty more may call the preserve home.
Styracosaurus
Herds of Styracosaurus are seen at the Australo National Dino Park. They are also subject to poaching as their horns are sold on the black market, much like rhinos. Shiranui used to work at the preserve as a field vet and tried helping an injured Styracosaurus, but though the animal was treated it still had some tranquilizer in its system, leading it to collapse in a body of water and drown. This incident affects Shiranui to this day.
Prosaurolophus
They could be seen at the Australo National Dino Park when Shiranui and his fellow vets are looking for an injured Styracosaurus. Though unnamed in the story, an afterword by the author confirms most of the dinosaurs in the preserve are from the Dinosaur Park Formation, with this and several other dinosaurs listed.
Unnamed Pachycephalosaurs
While Shiranui and his vets are searching for an injured Styracosaurus at Australo National Dino Park, a pair of unidentified pachycephalosaurs are seen. They may either be Stegoceras or Foraminacephale.
Daspletosaurus
They are an inhabitant of Australo National Dino Park. When the injured Styracosaurus died, an individual is seen scavenging its remains.
Apatosaurus
They are confirmed to be one of many dinosaurs that live in the modern world, though it is currently unknown if they're from the lost world or revived by genetics. Shiranui notes how a dinosaur park used a bone cancer treatment to save one of their Apatosaurus and recommends using the same treatment to save Umeko's leg.
Hyphalosaurus
A tank of these small reptiles is seen at the Chofu Paleoorganism Research Institute. The aquarium seems to be based on ones similar to those that house salamanders.

== Publication ==
Written by Itaru Kinoshita, the series began serialization in Shinchosha's Monthly Comic Bunch magazine on March 19, 2021. Shin-ichi Fujiwara, a lecturer at the Nagoya University Museum, is serving as the series' research consultant. Monthly Comic Bunch was discontinued in March 2024. On April 26, 2024, the series resumed its serialization on Comic Bunch Kai. As of June 2026, the series' individual chapters have been collected into nine tankōbon volumes.

In January 2022, Seven Seas Entertainment announced that they licensed the series for English publication. Kinoshita has expressed he would like to see the series adapted into an anime or live-action film.

=== Volume list ===
No.	Original release date	Original ISBN	English release date	English ISBN
1	September 9, 2021	978-4-10-772421-2	September 27, 2022	978-1-68-579324-1
1. "Needy Yuki" (甘えん坊のユキ, Amaenbo no Yuki); 2. "Welcome to Fatherhood, Niko" (ニコ、父になる, Niko, Chichi ni Naru); 3. "A Place for Masaru, Part 1" (マサルの居場所①, Masaru no I Basho Ichi 1); 4. "A Place for Masaru, Part 2" (マサルの居場所②, Masaru no I Basho Ichi 2); 5. "Roy's Destiny" (ロイの宿命, Roi no Shukumei)
Suma Suzume begins her dream job as a dinosaur keeper at Enoshima Dinoland. Her first day starts on a hot summer day, which has been a source of complaints for the staff. Theropod keeper Kaidou Arata performs a feeding for a school but has difficulty calming a girl who got scared by the park's Giganotosaurus, Yuuki. Suma arrives and is able to calm the girl to enjoy Yuuki's behavior. After formally introducing herself, Suma is assigned to work with Arata for a short period of time. While the two work with the Troodon pair, Arata realizes the enclosures air-conditioning has stopped working and sees Niko, the brooding male, suffering from heat stroke and a caught throat. With few options, Arata and Suma enter the enclosure to help him. Though they remove what was blocking Niko's throat, Arata gets kicked after Suma loses her grip on the dinosaur. Arata sends her away so that he and Kirishima, but she returns with a block of ice from a food stand to help cool Niko. They succeed and the Troodon eggs hatch with no further problems. Suma is later transferred to work with Karin Kirishima, the park's ceratopsian keeper, for a week. The two work with the Triceratops Masaru. While cleaning his enclosure and feeding him, Kirishima reveals how she worked with Masaru at Dino Park until an accident broke one of Masaru's horns and had him sold to Enoshima Dinoland, Kirishima joining the parks staff no long after. Later, Suma overhears a confrontation between Kirishima and Ogino when he says his superiors are planning to sell Masaru. Suma helps Kirishima to gain popularity for Masaru by building a display with Masaru's broken horn that showed information about Masaru's personal life. Though no one initially shows interest, online influencer Pyonkobuu and her boyfriend spark public interest when they share the display and the dinosaur on their social media. While working with Arata at the Dilophosaurus enclosure, veterinarian Shiranui Ren meets the two for a monthly checkup with the exhibit's sole inhabitant, Roy. Shiranui examines Roy's dung and suspects a health issue, so he has Roy tranquilized and examined. Shiranui finds Roy's suffering from a combination of gout and mild kidney failure, which he is able to prescribe antibiotics and herbal supplements to help Roy's conditions. Suma expresses her admiration to Shiranui's hard work but is met with contempt from the vet. Arata tries to stand up for Suma, but Shiranui reminds him about the Ichigo incident, which silences Arata.
2	April 8, 2022	978-4-10-772485-4	March 14, 2023	978-1-68-579325-8
6. "The Ichigo Incident, Part 1" (イチゴの悲劇①, Ichigo no Higeki Ichi 1); 7. "The Ichigo Incident, Part 2" (イチゴの悲劇②, Ichigo no Higeki Ichi 2); 8. "Two Sides of Benkei, Part 1" (内弁慶なベンケエ①, Naiben Yorokobi na 1); 9. "Two Sides of Benkei, Part 2" (内弁慶なベンケエ②, Naiben Yorokobi na 2); 10. "One Summer, in Dinoland" (あの夏、ディノランドで, Ano Natsu, Dino Rando de); 11. "Happy Birthday, Hanako" (花子の誕生日, Hanako no Tanjō Hi); Bonus: "A Day in Ichigo's Life" (イチゴの日常, Ichigo no Nichijō)
Suma finds Arata and a memorial dedicated to Ichigo, an Allosaurus he used to work with along with his predecessor Yamaga. While following Yamaga's orders which disregarded the park's buddy system, Ichigo gets startled by construction noises and kills Yamaga. She nearly escaped but is caught and euthanized. Arata placed the blame on himself and apologizes to Suma, knowing the incident placed public blame on her father who was a scientist that worked with dinosaurs. Suma, however, does not blame Arata and reaffirms why she wants to keep working at the park. Impressed by Suma's selflessness, Arata and Ogino assign her to take care of Benkei, the Troodon's runt. Though having trouble, Suma notes his intelligence and plans to use it to integrate him back into the Troodon family with the use of a puzzle. Though Benkei is able to solve it, he is continually bullied by his siblings. Realizing that she cannot help Benkei, Suma allows him to be taken to the Chofu Paleoorganism Research Institute, a special location that studies and handles dinosaurs until they are ready to be taken to dinosaur zoos. Later, Suma and Arata plan a birthday gift for the park's Tyrannosaurus, Hanako. Hanako has been refusing to go on exhibit due to her age and has not been able to meet public expectations. To get Hanako out for her birthday, Suma and Arata use a "cake" made from hadrosaur meat. With the public watching and Suma presenting, Hanako goes on display and eats her cake. With her probationary period over, it is decided Suma will work with other dinosaur keepers before she could be placed in a department. In a side story, a high school student visits the park with his crush before admitting he would like to go on more dates with her. Meanwhile, the Centosaurus herd enters its mating season with Shoukichi getting with Umeko.
3	September 8, 2022	978-4-10-772529-5	September 5, 2023	979-8-88-843006-4
12. "A New Role" (新たな役目, Arata na Yakume); 13. "Clumsy Hachibei, Part 1" (うっかりハチベエ①, Ukkari Hachibei 1); 14. "Clumsy Hachibei, Part 2" (うっかりハチベエ②, Ukkari Hachibei 2); 15. "Dino Fans Forever!" (推し活よ永遠なれ！, Oshi Katsu yo Eien Nare！); 16. "Moving Momiji" (モミジの引っ越し大作戦, Momiji no Hikkoshi dai Sakusen); 17. "Sophia from the Sea" (碧い世界のソフィア①, Aoi Sekai no Sofia 1); Bonus: "Days with Daisy" (デイジーとの日々, Deijii to no Hibi)
During a meeting, Suma proposes to have live cams recording the dinosaurs as a way to get people invested in the dinosaurs and garner more attention for the park. This leads to her being in charge of the park's social media before she starts working with Igarashi Keisuke, the stegosaur and pachycephalosaur keeper. He gets a call that Hachibei, the Pachycephalosaurus, has injured himself. Though he is successfully treated, it has been a recurring problem that need to be looked into. After constant surveillance, Suma notices that Hachibei only injures himself during rain. During a storm, they notice something is startling him and quickly investigate. Shiranui followed them and they all notice another potential health problem, leading them to give him a CT scan and diagnosing him with pneumonia caused by a reshaped nostril from his injuries. While Heichibei is recovering, Suma and Igarashi find that a clogged gutter was constantly startling and waking him up, which lead him to accidentally bumping his head in a tired state. They unclog the gutter and Hachibei makes a full recovery. During the fall season, Suma helps Kirishima and Igarashi move Daikichi and Momiji around so that Shochiki and Umeko can breed in peace. Though initially having trouble with Momiji, the move goes well. In a side story, high school friends Yukari and Akiho go through a rough patch with Akiho overhearing Yukari bad talking dinosaurs which she likes and Yukari about to move to New Zealand with her family, though the two are able to make amends. Meanwhile, Igarashi talks to Suma about his previous employment at another dinosaur zoo called Blue World. Though being a caretaker, Igarashi winds up breaking rules to educate people about Sophia, the aquarium's Globidens. This leads him to confront his superiors about educating people about prehistoric life, only to get shot down.
4	April 7, 2023	978-4-10-772590-5	March 26, 2024	979-8-88-843349-2
18. "Sophia from the Sea, Part 2" (碧い世界のソフィア②, Aoi Sekai no Sofia 2); 19. "Smile, Momiji!" (モミジスマイル！, Momiji Sumairu!); 20. "Follow that Raptor, Part 1" (ラプトルを追えっ！①, Raputoru o Oe! 1); 21. "Follow that Raptor, Part 2" (ラプトルを追えっ！②, Raputoru o Oe! 2); 22. "The Armored Dinosaur's Dilemma, Part 1" (トゲトゲハートの鎧竜①, Togetoge Hāto no Yoroi Ryū 1); Bonus: "Showdown" (格闘, Kakutō)
Continuing his story, Igarashi learns about Sophia's origin and how his superior was not too different from him when he was younger. After learning his tale, Suma gets excited about her part in helping the park. However, her social media posts are not doing too well and requests help from Igarashi to make a post for Momiji. She joins him in preparing the exhibit for winter, during which she notes Momoji's beak looking like a smile face-to-face and is able to post it. The post does decently well and gets some new guests. Arata has Suma help him with a wild Velociraptor that was illegally bred and trafficked before it escaped. After talking with the authorities and getting eyewitness reports, they realize the raptor is using a nearby shrine as shelter and food. They plan to trap it by luring it with fish and blocking any potential escape routes with the police. Though it fought back, the plan worked, and the Velociraptor is sent to the Chofu Paleoorganism Research Institute. Once everything is situated, Suma works with Katase Harue to tend to the park's Pinacosaurus and Citipati, though the two do not get along well due to their clashing personalities and styles.
5	December 8, 2023	978-4-10-772624-7	September 24, 2024	979-8-89-160495-7
23. "The Armored Dinosaur's Dilemma, Part 2" (トゲトゲハートの鎧竜②, Togetoge Hāto no Gairyū 2); 24. "Time for a Dino Diet" (お太りさまダイエット, Otari-sama Daietto); 25. "The Love You Feel" (好きなきもち, Suki na Kimochi); 26. "Umeko's Future, Part 1" (梅子の未来①, Umeko no Mirai 1); 27. "Umeko's Future, Part 2" (梅子の未来②, Umeko no Mirai 2)
Though Suma improves while working with Katase, he is still bothered by their previous confrontation. While venting to Arata and Shiranui, Arata tells him that he might need to loosen up. One day, Suma is late to work with Katase, much to his chagrin. While helping Ogino with park surveys, he reads one that explains why Suma was late: she was helping an old lady with weak legs walk around the park. Understanding his position as a dinokeeper is to help both dinosaurs and the guests, he apologizes to Suma for his frigid behaviour, leading to the two working better for the remainder of her working period. Suma is placed under Kirishima's supervision to work with the Centrosaurus pair Shoukichi and Umeko. They work to make new enrichment items to help Shoukichi lose some weight to make their couplings easier for them both. After a few attempts that never kept his attention, Suma suggests using an ice block after noting his playful behavior in snow. The plan works as the park prepares for Ammo-Night, a holiday related night that celebrates the dinosaurs of the park and local traditions. After Suma calls off from work due to a cold, Kirishima takes over a school tour she was supposed to work. As Kirishima shows the group how they take care of Masaru, she engages with a schoolgirl who loves dinosaurs named Sakura. When asked if liking and working with dinosaurs are more so boy related, Kirishima assures her that it does not matter so long as she knows she loves dinosaurs. This gives the shy girl the confidence to talk to the other students about the dinosaurs they see on their tour. While working with Shoukichi and Umeko, Shiranui notes something seems to be off with Umeko despite conditions being favorable. After some tests, Shiranui diagnoses her with bone cancer in her back leg and recommends amputation. Though this will save her, she will be unable to breed and may never live as she used to. Suma begs Shiranui to find alternatives so she can survive and live a quality life. He calls Aliza, a dinosaur vet he worked with at Australo National Dino Park, for advice. She asks him what kind of future he wants Umeko to have, leading Shiranui to decide against amputation.
6	July 6, 2024	978-4-10-772731-2	March 18, 2025	979-8-89373-266-5
28. "Umeko's Future, Part 3" (梅子の未来③, Umeko no Mirai 3); 29. "A Dinokeeper's Dream" (飼育員の夢, Shiikuin no Yume); 30. "From Dinosaurs to Pterosaurs" (ダイナソーからプテラソー, Dainasō kara Puterasō); 31. "You Can Do It, Polo!" (がんばれ、ポーロ！, Ganbare, Pōro!); 32. "Benkei's Little Friend, Part 1" (ベンケイと小さな友達①, Benkei to Chiisana Tomodachi 1); 33. "Benkei's Little Friend, Part 2" (ベンケイと小さな友達②, Benkei to Chiisana Tomodachi 2); Bonus: "From That Day Forth" (あの日から, Ano Hi kara)
Shiranui recommends one of two treatments: a joint replacement surgery that was documented to have worked on a Triceratops or a bone graft that was previously used on an Apatosaurus. Kirishima lets him choose the latter option and the operation begins after a discussion with Ogino. As time goes by, Umeko's treatment shows positive signs and she is able to recover. Once her time with Kirishima is done, Suma is assigned to work with Hayashi Fuzuki and the park's pterosaurs. Before doing so, Suma goes to a pub with Arata, learning that he was a part of a construction business and was set to inherit the family business. His father did not approve his dinosaur interests, but Arata was able to become a dinokeeper with the help of his mother, resulting in his father disowning him and allowing his younger sister to inherit the business. While working with the pterosaurs with Hayashi, Suma asks why she works with the flying reptiles. Hayashi replies that she has an interest in them due to general misunderstandings of them and how the aviary being a way to clear them to the public gets her attention. They notice one of the Pterodaustro, Polo, has a tear in her wing caused by Pyou after she tried to take their food. Though she's treated, the incident has shaken her to the point of not eating on her own. Hayashi assigns Suma to help Polo feed on her own. Though initially having trouble, Suma is able to get Polo to eat on her own after tossing the food into her unique beak and calming her down enough to scoop up her food on her own. Later, Suma is invited to go to the Chofu Paleoorganism Research Institute by its lab head Yamada to reunite with Benkei, getting the ire of Yuuki, the lonely son of the institute's CEO who seemed to have gotten close with the runt. Suma and Yuuki have a contest over who Benkei likes more, one that Suma wins with ease as Benkei remembers her raising him. Yuuki has an outburst that reveals the institute's future closure. Yamada confirms that the current CEO is planning to close the institute due to it not making enough money to warrant its continuation. While Yamada deals with an emergency, Suma has a talk with Yuuki and relates with his parental strain with her own experiences of loneliness and constantly working father. She reasons that even though her and Yuuki's fathers were constantly busy and inattentive, they do care. While watching Benkei is using a feeder enrichment log, Suma note his unusual tool usage that's not seen even in other Troodon. Realizing the significance of this discovery, Suma proposes to Yamada to use this as a way to keep the institute going.
7	January 8, 2025	978-4-10-772783-1	September 30, 2025	979-8-89561-645-1
34. "Benkei's Little Friend, Part 3" (ベンケイと小さな友達 ③, Benkei to Chiisana Tomodachi 3); 35. "Do the Dilophosaurus!" (ロイダンスを踊ろう!, Roi Dansu o Odorō!); 36. "Trom in the Backyard, Part 1" (バックヤードのトロム ①, Bakku Yādo no Toromu 1); 37. "Trom in the Backyard, Part 2" (バックヤードのトロム ②, Bakku Yādo no Toromu 2); 38. "Walk Like a Psittaco" (プシッタコウォーク, Pusittako Wōku); Bonus: "Tomorrow Is Another Day" (明日は明日の風が吹く, Ashita wa Ashita no Kaze ga Fuku)
When Yuuki's father visits the institute, Suma, Yamada, and Yuuki show him Benkei's abilities with hopes of changing his mind. Though impressed, he sticks by his decision to close the institute as he views there's little monetary gain. When he tries to take Yuuki home, however, Yuuki vents his loneliness and makes a passionate plea to not separate him from Benkei. Later, Yamada reveals the CEO has put the closure "on hold" instead, though he notes that the CEO has been spending more time with Yuuki and getting involved with the studies that goes on. Suma promises to visit in the near future. After some time passes, a television crew comes to the park for some behind the scenes footage and to interview the employees. Things go smoothly with Suma showing some of the inner workings of the departments, but she is eventually called in to assist removing a pigeon Roy injured as there's concern it could spread disease and risk Roy's already sensitive health. She and Katase mimic the mating dance of a female Dilophosaurus to try and remove him from the exhibit. Roy, at first, isn't interested until Katase makes a mating call that brings him in and allows Arata a chance to get the pigeon out and be treated by Kazama. Suma works with him the next day, being introduced to the park's blind Deinonychus Trom. Kazama shows Suma his feeding technique with the use of a clicker before they start a test live stream of the park's Psittacosaurus, animals that he also takes care of. He lets Suma be in charge of feeding Trom while he attends a conference in Tokyo. Trom, however, gets confused over her over clicking and goes to his sleeping area without eating. Concerned, she has Kazama come back early to help. He successfully feeds Trom and lightly scolds her as he reminds her, he's a nervous animal and can get spoked easily. After getting her lunch, Kazama advices Suma to be her usual self around Trom as he's an animal like the others she worked with. The next day, they use a motorized ball to playing and exercise Trom. During the weekend, the Psittacosaurus live stream goes viral, and the park gets an increase in guests wanting to see and pet them. Suma helps with the guests at the area, meeting a father and daughter who wanted to get in but did not reserve a time slot. When a mother steps out, Kazama stays by her son and teaches him about the dinosaurs. Sometime later, Ogino gets a call and announces that someone from the head office is coming to observe the park and its staff.
8	November 8, 2025	978-4-10-772887-6	July 28, 2026	979-8-89765-328-7
39. Arata na Sutēji (新たなステージ); 40. Saikuru × Risaikuru (サイクル×リサイクル); 41. Kuishinbō no Momo 1 (食いしん坊のモモ ①); 41. Kuishinbō no Momo 2 (食いしん坊のモモ ②); 42. Kore kara no Koto (これからのこと); Bonus: Mazaru no Imyō (マザルの異名)
During the meeting with the head office representative, it's announced the Enoshima Dinoland is facing closure by the end of the year if attendance doesn't improve and meet profit expectations. Despite the news and fear for the future, the team agree to work together to meet expectations and ensure the park's future. While brainstorming ways to get people's attention through social media, Suma assists Kazama with walking the Psittacosaurus through a new route for an annual event. While talking with him, Suma comes up with an idea to boost public interest: placing a camera on the back one of the Psittacosaurus, Azuki, and recording the walk from her perspective. With renewed vigor, Suma requests going full-time with her social media advertising. She works with Arata and Kurumi to record Hanako as a way to view her while she's off exhibit. While working with Kurumi at the park's food storage to feed the dinosaurs, Suma meets Sankichi, a local farmer who brought in vegetables that grew in gardens that used dinosaur dung from the park as fertilizer. He requests some help for selling the dino-veggies with ideas for new packaging. They go to Hayashi for assistance, who agrees on the condition that the packaging have a QR code for Dinoland. Sankichi agrees and, after getting permission from the park's corporate office, the group work on a video for the code's link. Suma comes up with the idea to record Hanako with a camera on a remote-control car. Although the toy is nearly crushed by the Tyrannosaurus, Hayashi was able to get great footage of Hanako chasing the car and use the recording for the QR code. Late, Suma shadows Kurumi as they work with the park's Camarasaurus, Momo. Kurumi proposes a post involving Momo's claw trimming. After the pedicure, however, they notice a change in Momo's feeding habit and call Shiranui to check her. He believes that she's constipated for unknown reasons and suggests observing her for a bit. After some time, Suma assumes Momo's eating branches she's not supposed to and brings it up to Kurumi. Though the tree is trimmed. Kurumi doubts it's the cause of Momo's digestive problems as she's eaten it before. Not long after, Suma catches Momo eating a plastic bag and realize that she may have trash in her system. Shiranui uses an enema and massage to clear Momo's blockage. After a meeting about what could be done to broaden Dinoland's social media presence, Arata proposes having Hanako be a focal point ash she's exceeded the average lifespan of a Tyrannosaurus and suggests special contests and livestreams involving future birthdays. Everyone else propose ideas of their own, but get interrupted when an employee bursts in with troubling news about Hanako.
9	June 9, 2026	978-4-10-772949-1	—	—

== Reception ==
Danica Davidson of Otaku USA praised the story, characters, and extra notes from Fujiwara, noting that "Dinosaur Sanctuary does a good job of making [dinosaurs] like animals with personalities, rather than monsters in a monster movie". Jonathan Greenall of Comic Book Resources praised the tone and art style. Additionally, Greenall felt the series does a good job of describing how to care for animals. J. Caleb Mozzocco of School Library Journal also praised the artwork and characters. Mozocco felt the plot was "[Jurassic Park but] the park works like it was supposed to".

The series ranked 20th in the 2023 Next Manga Award in the print manga category. The series was ranked eighth in AnimeJapan's "Manga We Want to See Animated" poll in 2026.
