= Itaru Ishii =

Japanese international consultant

Itaru Ishii (石井 至, Ishii Itaru; born 1965) is an international consultant. He is the President of Ishii Brothers' Co., located in Tokyo, Japan, an independent consulting firm and licensed publisher.

== Personal ==
He was born in Hokkaido in 1965. He graduated from the University of Tokyo Medical Department with a Ph.D.

== Positions ==
- Advisor to the Prime Minister Office of Japan for Tourism Promotion Planning (since Nov 2015)
- A member of Tourism Promotion Committee of The Ministry of Land, Infrastructure, Transport and Tourism of Japan (since April 2013)
- Advisor to Japan Tourism Agency (since February 2015)
- Advisor to Hokkaido regional government for Tourism Promotion (since November 2015)
- Advisor to Hokkaido Tourism Organization (since October 2013)
- Deputy Executive Director of CAPDI (Centrist Asia Pacific Democrats International)
- Honorable advisor to the Embassy of Dominican Republic to Japan
- Special Advisor to the Embassy of Rwanda Republic to Japan
- Advisor to Nikkei Ducare, a magazine published by Nikkei

== Books ==
- "The Integrated Resorts in the World" (2015), Ishii Brothers' Company (ISBN 978-4-903-85212-6).
- "The system of Risk Management" (2010), Toyo Keizai, Tokyo (ISBN 978-4-492-09298-9).
- "Keio Elementary school" (2010), Gentosha, Tokyo (ISBN 978-4-34-498164-5).
- "Choice and result of myself who graduated global capitalism" (2011), Nikkei BP, Tokyo (ISBN 978-4-822-24894-9).
- "Sorge, Caviar, & Azerbaijan" An official travel guide for Azerbaijan approved by Minister of Tourism and Culture of Azerbaijan (2013), Ishii Brothers' Company, Tokyo (ISBN 978-4-903-85210-2).
- "Keio Yochisha Elementary School and Keio Yokohama Elementary School" (2013), Asahi Shimbun, Tokyo (ISBN 978-4-02-273561-4).

== TV ==
- Honma Dekka TV, Fuji Television
- Matsuko no Shiranai Sekai, TBS
- FX Philosophy 3.0, Theater Television
