= I'm a Dirty Dinosaur =

Children's book

- Author: Janeen Brian
- Illustrator: Ann James
- Cover artist: Ann James
- Language: English
- Genre: Children's picture book
- Published: 2013 (Penguin Books)
- Media type: Print (paperback)
- Pages: 22 (unpaginated)
- ISBN: 9780670076154
- OCLC: 810397899

I'm a Dirty Dinosaur is a 2013 Children's picture book written by Janeen Brian and illustrated by Ann James. It is about a small dinosaur that revels in covering itself in mud then goes to a swamp to get clean.

== Publication history ==
- 2013, Australia, Penguin Books ISBN 9780670076154
- 2014, USA, Kane/Miller ISBN 9781610672962

== Reception ==
A star review in Kirkus Reviews of I'm a Dirty Dinosaur wrote "It is nearly impossible to look at without reading aloud, chanting aloud, and even tapping and stamping and sliding: extreme joyousness." Publishers Weekly wrote "Brian’s narrative lends itself to reading aloud, and it invites both chiming in and imitating the dinosaur’s movements (preferably sans mud)."

I'm a Dirty Dinosaur has also been reviewed by School Library Journal, Reading Time, Magpies, and Scan: The Journal For Educators.

It won a 2014 Speech Pathology of Australia Award, and is a 2014 CBCA Book of the Year: Early Childhood honour book, with the judges noting its, "sharp, lilting language to convey the light-hearted, fun filled celebration of guilt free playing in the mud," and, "the illustrator’s seemingly effortless outline drawings, ..".

There is a sculpture of the little dinosaur at the Storybook Walk, Thalassa Park, Onkaparinga, South Australia.
