= Edwina, the Dinosaur Who Didn't Know She Was Extinct =

2006 picture book by Mo Willems

- Front cover, designed by Mo Willems
- Author: Mo Willems
- Original title: None
- Translator: None
- Cover artist: Willems
- Language: English
- Series: N/A
- Subject: Dinosaurs, School, Humor
- Genre: children's books picture books
- Publisher: Hyperion Books
- Publication date: 2006
- Publication place: United States of America
- Media type: Hardcover
- Pages: 40
- ISBN: 978-0-7868-3748-9
- OCLC: 70597027
- Dewey Decimal: [E] 22
- LC Class: PZ7.W65535 Edw 2006
- Preceded by: N/A
- Followed by: N/A

Edwina, the Dinosaur Who Didn't Know She Was Extinct is an American children's picture book written and illustrated by Mo Willems. It was released in 2006 by Hyperion Books.

In 2011, Weston Woods Studios released an animated version of the book, narrated by Cheryl Willems, with Mo Willems as the voice of Reginald.

== Plot ==
In the book, Edwina the dinosaur is well loved by the people of her town due to her acts of kindness. However, a boy named Reginald Von Hoobie-Doobie tries to convince everyone that dinosaurs are supposed to be extinct. Reginald even argues to Edwina herself that she should be extinct, but he eventually relents. In the end, Edwina bakes him a fresh batch of cookies.

== Reception ==
The book was well-received, winning a National Parenting Publications Award in 2006. Steve Johnson of the Wichita Eagle declared, "Willems has written a unique story every bit as good as the classic Danny and the Dinosaur. His illustrations are playful with bright colors and bold expressions." Lana Berkowitz of the Houston Chronicle called it "a winner", while The Courier-Journal's Jill Johnson Keeney said it was a "worthy successor" to Willems' earlier books, such as Don't Let the Pigeon Drive the Bus! and Knuffle Bunny: A Cautionary Tale. Kirkus Reviews called it "A fey foray into existentialism from an emerging master of whimsy."

== "Hoobie-Doobie" ==
Explaining Reginald's last name to an interviewer, Willems said, "'Hoobie-Doobie' is my generic fill-in for when I can't think of a word (as in 'Hand me the Hoobie-Doobie, please.'). Because I am consistently blank on the English language, it's a phrase that is heard quite a bit around the house. My editor always giggles when I use the phrase, so I plopped it in as a placeholder when I pitched the story."

== See also ==
- Danny and the Dinosaur, a similar book about a dinosaur
