= XTNCT =

XTNCT is a comic strip set in the Far Future which involved genetically modified dinosaurs. It was created by Paul Cornell and D'Israeli and published in the Judge Dredd Megazine.

== Synopsis ==
In the far future, the remnants of the human race use genetically engineered animals to fight for them. The character of Father uses special dinosaur commandos to fight on his behalf. A raptor from one such group of commandos accidentally kills a human and Father orders the death of the entire group. They escape and decide to hunt down and kill all the remaining humans on the Earth.

== Bibliography ==
- XTNCT (with Paul Cornell and D'Israeli, in Judge Dredd Megazine #209-214, 2003–2004, collected in trade paperback, XTNCT: CM ND HV G F Y THNK YR HRD NGH!, 48 pages, hardcover, December 2006, ISBN 1-904265-69-3)

== Characters ==
- Father
- Rex Leader of the group of commandos, genetically based on a Tyrannosaurus.
- Forest Plant life form.
- Aviatrix Flying member of the group, with physiology based on a Pterosaur.
- Trike Large and heavily armed commando, based on a Triceratops.
- Raptor Very aggressive member of the group, capable of travelling at extremely high speeds, based on a Deinonychus, a relative of the Velociraptor.
