= Syd Hoff =

American cartoonist and children's author

- Born: Sydney Hoffberg; September 4, 1912 Bronx, New York City, United States
- Died: May 12, 2004 (aged 91) Miami Beach, Florida, United States
- Areas: Cartoonist, author
- Notable works: Danny and the Dinosaur; Tuffy; Laugh It Off; The Ruling Clawss, as A. Redfield
- Spouse: Dora Hoff
- Children: 3

Syd Hoff (September 4, 1912 – May 12, 2004) was an American cartoonist and children's book author, best known for his classic early reader Danny and the Dinosaur. His cartoons appeared in a multitude of genres, including advertising commissions for such companies as Eveready Batteries, Jell-O, OK Used Cars, S.O.S Pads, Rambler, Ralston Cereal, and more.

== Biography ==
Hoff was born in Bronx, New York. While he was still at high school, Milt Gross, a popular 1930s cartoonist, told Hoff at an assembly, "Kid, someday you'll be a great cartoonist!" At age 16, he enrolled at the National Academy of Design in New York City. At age 18, Hoff sold his first cartoon to The New Yorker and eventually sold a total of 571 of them to the publication from 1931 to 1975. Hoff became known for his cartoons in The New Yorker depicting tenements and lower-middle class life in the city.

Hoff's cartoons have appeared in a variety of publications including the New Yorker, Esquire, and Look magazine. He was also the host of a television show Tales of Hoff, in which he drew and told stories.

Hoff wrote and illustrated over 60 volumes in the HarperCollins "I Can Read" series for beginning readers, most notably Sammy the Seal and the popular Danny and the Dinosaur (1958), which sold 10 million copies and has been translated into 12 languages.

In 1976, Hoff edited and published Editorial and Political Cartooning: From Earlier Times to the Present, which contains over 700 examples of works from the world's editorial and political cartoons.

Hoff died of pneumonia on May 12, 2004, at age 91.

== Syndicated comic strips ==
Hoff drew two long-running syndicated comic strips: Tuffy (1939–1949) and Laugh It Off (1958–1978). One of his recurring characters is a walrus-mustached man who eventually appeared as the father in his daily Tuffy, done for the King Features Syndicate from 1939 to 1950.

Tuffy was originally commissioned by William Randolph Hearst in 1938, and was declared "essential for national morale" during the American involvement in World War II. This classification kept Hoff out of active military duty during World War II, although he joined the Office of War Information and drew propaganda cartoons which were dropped behind enemy lines.

== Political cartoons as A. Redfield ==
Starting in 1933, Hoff began to contribute cartoons to leftist newspapers and magazines, including The Daily Worker and New Masses as A. Redfield, the pseudonym that he adopted for his radical work. Hoff's first published book The Ruling Clawss (Daily Worker, 1935) collects over 150 Hoff cartoons originally published in the communist daily, and his first book for children Mr. His: A Children's Story for Anybody was published as a pamphlet by (and also within the pages of) New Masses magazine.

Hoff's output under the A. Redfield pseudonym began to taper off by 1940, though he remained politically active. He was questioned by the FBI in 1952 about his A. Redfield work and Communist Party association, after being photographed with Marxist civil liberties advocate Corliss Lamont at a protest against the atomic bomb the previous year. Hoff was never formally charged, nor blacklisted. Nevertheless, he remained concerned for the remainder of his life about being identified as a "Red" and the impact that this might have on the reception of his children's books.

== Bibliography ==
=== Children's books ===
- Mr. His: a Children's Story for Anybody (New Masses, 1939)
- Muscles and Brains (Dial Press, 1940)
- It's Fun Learning Cartooning (Stravon Publishers, 1952)
- Out of Gas (Ives Washburn, 1954)
- Eight Little Artists (Abelard-Schuman)
- Patty's Pet (Young Readers Press, 1955)
- Danny and the Dinosaur series (Harper & Row, 1958–1996)
  - Danny and the Dinosaur (1958)
  - Happy Birthday, Danny and the Dinosaur (1995)
  - Danny and the Dinosaur Go to Camp (1996)
  - Danny and the Dinosaur: Too Tall (2014)
  - Danny and the Dinosaur and the New Puppy (2015)
  - Danny and the Dinosaur and the Girl Next Door (2016)
  - Danny and the Dinosaur: School Days (2017)
- Julius (Harper & Row, 1959)
- Sammy the Seal (Harper & Row, 1959)
- Ogluk the Eskimo (Holt, Rinehart & Winston, 1960)
- Oliver (Harper & Row, 1960)
- Where's Prancer? (Harper & Brothers, 1960)
- Who Will Be My Friends? (Harper & Row, 1960)
- Chester (Harper & Row, 1961)
- Albert the Albatross (Harper & Row, 1961)
- Little Chief (Harper & Row, 1961)
- Stanley (Harper & Row, 1962)
- Grizzwold (Reader's Digest Services, 1963)
- Lengthy (G.P. Putnam's Sons, 1964)
- Mrs. Switch (Putnam, 1966)
- Learning to Cartoon (Stravon Educational Press, 1966)
- The Homework Caper (Harper & Row, 1966) - text by Joan M. Lexau
- Irving and Me (Harper & Row, 1967) — for young adults; no illustrations
- Jeffrey at Camp (Putnam, 1968)
- Slithers (G.P. Putnam's Sons, 1968)
- Wanda's Wand (C. R. Gibson Co., 1968)
- The Witch, the Cat, and the Baseball Bat (Grosset & Dunlap, 1968)
- The Rooftop Mystery (Harper & Row, 1968) — text by Joan M. Lexau
- Baseball Mouse (Putnam, 1969)
- Herschel the Hero (Putnam, 1969)
- Roberto and the Bull (McGraw-Hill, 1969)
- The Horse in Harry's Room (Harper & Row, 1970)
- My Aunt Rosie (Harper & Row, 1972)
- Ida the Bareback Rider (G.P. Putnam's Sons, 1972)
- A Walk Past Ellen's House (McGraw-Hill, 1973)
- Amy's Dinosaur (Windmill Books/Simon & Schuster, 1974)
- Barkley (Harper & Row, 1975)
- The Littlest Leaguer (Harper & Row, 1976)
- Henrietta series (Garrard Pub. Co., 1977–1985)
  - Henrietta Lays Some Eggs (1977)
  - Henrietta, Circus Star (1978)
  - Henrietta, the Early Bird (1978)
  - Henrietta Goes to the Fair (1979)
  - Henrietta's Halloween (1980)
  - Henrietta's Fourth of July (1981)
  - Happy Birthday, Henrietta! (1983)
  - Henrietta's Vacation (1985)
- Walpole (Harper & Row, 1977)
- Syd Hoff Shows You How to Draw Cartoons (Scholastic Book Services, 1979)
- Santa's Moose (Harper & Row, 1979)
- The Man Who Loved Animals (Putnam Publishing Group, 1982)
- The Young Cartoonist, The ABC's of Cartooning (Stravon, 1983)
- Barney's Horse (Harper & Row, 1987)
- Mrs. Brice's Mice (Harper & Row, 1988)
- Captain Cat (HarperCollins, 1993)
- The Lighthouse Children (HarperCollins, 1994)
- Duncan the Dancing Duck (Clarion Books, 1994)
- Bernard on His Own (Clarion Books, 1996)

=== Books for adults ===
- The Ruling Clawss (Daily Worker, 1935)
- Naval Secrets: This Book is Filled with Man-to-Man Ideas and Aids to Help you Record Your Bang-up Navy Experiences (Hillair Publishing Company, 1943)
- Military Secrets: This Book is Filled with Man-to-Man Ideas and Aids to Help you Record Your Bang-up Army Experiences (Hillair Publishing Company, 1943)
- Feeling No Pain: an Album of Cartoons (Dial Press, 1944)
- Mom, I'm Home! (Doubleday/Doran & Co., 1945)
- Oops! Wrong Party! (Dutton, 1951)
- Oops! Wrong Stateroom! (Washburn, 1953)
- Okay—You Can Look Now! (Duell, Sloan and Pearce, 1955)
- The Better Hoff (Holt, Rinehart and Winston, 1961)
- Upstream, Downstream and Out of My Mind (Bobbs-Merrill, 1961)
- Twixt the Cup and the Lipton (Bobbs-Merrill, 1962)
- So This is Matrimony: Cartoons (Pocket Books, 1962)
- Hunting, Anyone? (Bobbs-Merrill, 1963)
- From Bed to Nurse, or, What a Way to Die (Dell, 1963)

== Film ==
Hoff's 1962 book Stanley was adapted into a short stop-motion animation film called Stanley and the Dinosaurs in 1989. The film was produced by Churchill Films and directed by John Clark Matthews.
