= The Cavern Clan =

Group of fictional characters created by Maurício de Sousa

"The Cavern Clan" ("Piteco" in original Portuguese)
- Pitheco, the main character.
- Author(s): Mauricio de Sousa
- Current status/schedule: Running.
- Launch date: 1961
- Genre(s): Humor comics, Adventure comics, Prehistoric fiction

The Cavern Clan (Piteco) is a Brazilian comic strip created in 1961 by Mauricio de Sousa. It is part of the Monica's Gang series.

It centers around a prehistoric tribe in the Stone Age and depicts them living in the presence of dinosaurs. Most of the stories feature Pitheco hunting dinosaurs, running away from Tooga, or even his friends and he fighting against other village's people. The characters were anachronistically aware; for example, if a character needed to walk a long distance, he or she would say, “Too bad they didn’t invent the car yet, ’cause otherwise I could go faster”. Mauricio de Sousa was inspired by the American comic strips Tarzan (by Burne Hogarth) and Alley Oop strips and named Pitheco's village Lem (which in Alley Oop refer to Lemuria).

== Characters ==
- Pitheco (Piteco) – his whole name is Pithecanthropus erectus da Silva and he lives at the fictional Lem Village. He is mostly portrayed as a hunter who goes after dinosaurs and fish to eat. In some stories, he is also shown as a genius inventor able to create tools, furniture, and accessories used by the contemporary man. He also has to deal with Tooga, who is always attempting to marry him against his will. In most of the early stories, Pitheco found Horacio (another character, a small philosophical T-rex) in his egg, but he troubled Lem and was forced to leave.
- Tooga (Thuga) – Tooga has a strong crush on Pitheco. Her biggest dream is to marry him. However, Pitheco disapproves her idea. Tooga sometimes uses brute force to marry him (like capturing him and taking him to the "church"), but Pitheco always manages to escape.
- Hank (Bolota) is Pitheco's best friend. He is the one to give advice to Pitheco, when he finds himself in a difficult situation.
- Loony Lou (Beleléu) is Pitheco's cousin, a weird physicist of that village. However useful his inventions may seem, the citizens consider him a madman.
- Zoom & Boom (Zum e Bum) are identical twin thieves. They are homeless, but spend several nights at the local police prison. Their stories mostly feature them trying to escape from prison or attempting to steal valuable objects.
- Uncle Glunc (Tio Glunc) is Tooga's 50-year-old uncle. A greedy, petty, and selfish old man, he just wants to learn to become rich and make easy money at the expense of others. He is arrogant, hates poor people, and wants distance from them. He does not support Pitheco and tries at all costs to marry his niece to a rich husband and good party, so he can be sustained by both.
- Ogra is Tooga's best friend. A huge brute and ugly woman, she is single and looking for a boyfriend.
- Juiz da Paz is the judge from Lem Village, and is responsible for maintaining order in the clan and also organizing weddings.
- Horacio is a young dinosaur that was the pet to Pitheco in the first strips. Until 1963, he followed Pitheco in the stories, until he got his own spin-off series.

== Comic books ==
Stories of the series are often published in comic books of de Sousa characters like Monica, Jimmy Five (Cebolinha) and others since the 1970s, as well as other works created by Maurício de Sousa. The series also had two special comic books in the '90s by Editora Globo as a part of the series Gibizinho, and also an almanac with classic stories that was published by Panini Comics between 2009 and 2014, the latter starring alongside Horacio's World.

== Other versions ==
Pitheco has also made a cameo in the fourth issue of Monica Teen; he appears as a statue at a museum that comes alive after a spell used by Captain Fray.

In 2009, the character gets new version on the graphic novel MSP 50: in a story by the comic artist Flávio Luiz, he meets the Astronaut. In 2010, was released his second graphic novel, MSP + 50, in which Pitheco is the protagonist in three stories, one of them by Beto Nicácio (in which Pitheco was very similar to Marvel Comics' Wolverine), one by Emerson Lopes and another by Fabio Ciccone.

In 2011, was released MSP Novos 50, in which Pitheco starred in two stories: one edited by comic book artist Luke Ross (known for comic book illustrations for American comics) and another by comic book writer Alves. In November 2013, it was published in its first graphic novel starring Pitheco, ''Piteco - Ingá'', script and pencils by Shiko; the title refers to the inscriptions of the Ingá Stone, located in Paraíba. The author, Shiko. is originally from Paraíba.

In June 2019, a new graphic novel entitled "Piteco - Fogo", by Eduardo Ferigato, is launched, featuring new characters, such as Thala, Piteco and Thuga's growing daughter, which can be considered a spiritual sequel of Ingá. Fogo had a sequel in 2021 entitled "Piteco - Presas".

== Other medias ==
In 1965, Pitheco had a picture book released by publisher FTD, which was part of a series of books inspired by the Mauricio de Sousa's characters. In 1971, a song to Pitheco was composed for the album A Bandinha da Turma da Mônica. The characters are also featured in the Monica's Gang's 2007 animated film Uma Aventura no Tempo.

Two episodes of the webseries Monica Toy focused on The Cavern Clan also began to be made under the title Piteco Toy.

Pitheco is also a playable character in the 2018 game Mônica e a Guarda dos Coelhos.
