= Danny and the Dinosaur =

1958 book by Syd Hoff

- Cover of the 1958 hardcover edition.
- Author: Syd Hoff
- Illustrator: Syd Hoff
- Cover artist: Syd Hoff
- Language: English
- Genre: Children's literature
- Publisher: Harper & Brothers
- Publication date: 1958
- Publication place: United States
- Media type: Print
- Pages: 64
- ISBN: 978-0-06-022466-0
- OCLC: 13459675
- Preceded by: Patty's Pet
- Followed by: Sammy the Seal

Danny and the Dinosaur is a children's picture book by Syd Hoff, first published by Harper & Brothers in 1958. The story follows a boy named Danny and his city adventures with a living dinosaur from a museum. Danny and the Dinosaur is designated as an I Can Read! Book.

The idea for Danny and the Dinosaur came when Hoff began drawing for one of his daughters, who, at the time, was going through a physical therapy.

It has sold over ten million copies and has been translated into a dozen languages. The book spawned thirteen sequels as well as an animated short in 1990 by Weston Woods Studios.

== Plot ==
The story opens with a young boy named Danny going to a science or natural history museum. During a stroll around the museum, he immediately gets drawn to the dinosaur exhibit. The dinosaurs in the exhibit are really models, but Danny admires them and says he thinks it would be nice to play with one. One of the dinosaurs, surprisingly a living, breathing dinosaur, responds to Danny's wish to play with a dinosaur. Both agree to play together, and Danny rides out of the museum on the dinosaur's neck.

The dinosaur is well-intentioned throughout the story, learning to stop for a red light (which surprises a policeman), allowing a car to drive under him, helping people cross the street during a traffic jam, attending a baseball game with Danny, and taking Danny across a river. The dinosaur also becomes a celebrity, as the illustrations show hundreds of people leaving the zoo to see him. This results in the zookeeper politely asking them to leave so that the visitors can see the zoo animals.

When Danny meets up with his friends, they get to ride the dinosaur too. Then, Danny and the children all play with the dinosaur throughout the day. Finally, the children and the dinosaur play hide and seek, as they take turns hiding. When the dinosaur hides, the children find the dinosaur several times. In the last part of the game, Danny tells the other children to pretend they can't find the dinosaur. When the dinosaur reveals his hiding spot, Danny and his friends all cheer for the dinosaur and declare him the winner.

At sunset, all of the children leave, and the dinosaur says goodbye to Danny. Although Danny wants to keep the dinosaur as a pet, the dinosaur mentions that the museum needs him. When Danny says goodbye to the dinosaur, he knows that he can play with the dinosaur again some other day.

After watching the long tail go out of sight, Danny goes home alone. On his way home, Danny thinks about one of the things first stated in the story. He really wants to keep the dinosaur for a pet, but knows that it would be too big to live in a house. However, Danny concludes that he and the dinosaur "did have a wonderful day".

== Sequels ==
The book spawned thirteen other sequels (if counting I Can Read! books, paperback/hardcover books, and sticker books). However, the first few sequels (Happy Birthday Danny and the Dinosaur, Danny and the Dinosaur Go to Camp, Danny and the Dinosaur: Too Tall, Danny and the Dinosaur and the New Puppy, Danny and the Dinosaur and the Girl Next Door, Danny and the Dinosaur School Days, Danny and the Dinosaur Mind Their Manners, Danny and the Dinosaur and the Sand Castle Contest, and Danny and the Dinosaur Ride a Bike) like the original book (Danny and the Dinosaur) were designated as an I Can Read! book.

- Happy Birthday, Danny and the Dinosaur (1985)
- Danny and the Dinosaur Go to Camp (1996)
- Danny and the Dinosaur: Too Tall (2014)
- Danny and the Dinosaur and the New Puppy (2015)
- Danny and the Dinosaur and the Girl Next Door (2016)
- Danny and the Dinosaur: School Days (2017)
- Danny and the Dinosaur: Mind Their Manners
- Danny and the Dinosaur and the Sand Castle Contest
- Danny and the Dinosaur: Ride a Bike
- Danny and the Dinosaur: Happy Halloween
- Danny and the Dinosaur: A Very Dino Christmas
- Danny and the Dinosaur: First Valentine's Day
- Danny and the Dinosaur: Eggs, Eggs, Eggs

== Film adaptation ==
In January 2023, it was reported that the book series will adapt into a feature film with HarperCollins Productions and Legendary Entertainment set to produce.

== See also ==
- Edwina, the Dinosaur Who Didn't Know She Was Extinct, a similar book about a dinosaur
