= I'm a Hungry Dinosaur =

Children's picture book by Janeen Brian

- Author: Janeen Brian
- Illustrator: Ann James
- Cover artist: Ann James
- Language: English
- Genre: Children's picture book
- Published: 2015 (Penguin Books)
- Publication place: Australia
- Media type: Print (paperback)
- Pages: 22 (unpaginated)
- ISBN: 9780670078103
- OCLC: 951497762

I'm a Hungry Dinosaur is a 2015 children's picture book written by Janeen Brian and illustrated by Ann James. It is about a small dinosaur that makes a mess baking and eating a cake.

== Publication history ==
- 2015, Australia, Penguin Books ISBN 9780670078103
- 2016, USA, Kane/Miller ISBN 9781610674614

== Reception ==
Kirkus Reviews called it "A toddler-friendly celebration of messiness, with a yummy culmination."

I'm a Hungry Dinosaur has also been reviewed Reading Time, the School Library Journal, Magpies, and Scan: The Journal For Educators.

It is a 2016 CBCA Book of the Year: Early Childhood notable book, and a 2016 Speech Pathology of Australia Award shortlisted book.
