= Dinosaur vs. Bedtime =

2008 children's book by Bob Shea

- Author: Bob Shea
- Illustrator: Bob Shea
- Language: English
- Genre: children's books picture books
- Publisher: Disney-Hyperion
- Publication date: 2008
- Publication place: United States of America
- OCLC: 191931115

Dinosaur vs. Bedtime is a children's book, written and illustrated by Bob Shea. Published by Disney-Hyperion Books in 2008, Dinosaur vs. Bedtime tells the story of a young dinosaur taking on a series of challenges before going to bed.

== Story ==
The plot of Dinosaur vs. Bedtime centers around a young dinosaur that takes on many challenges, including adults, brushing his teeth, taking a bath, and eating spaghetti. The dinosaur takes on all the challenges put before, defeating them all by roaring at them, until he comes up against his final (or "biggest") challenge, bedtime. In the end "bedtime wins" and the dinosaur goes to sleep. The dinosaur is used in the story to represent a stubborn child who does not want to go to bed. Dinosaur vs. Bedtime was illustrated by Shea, who utilized mixed media including crayon, paint and photography.
