= Horacio's World =

Brazilian Comic strip series

- Author: Mauricio de Sousa
- Illustrator: Mauricio de Sousa
- Launch date: 1961
- Original language: Portuguese (Brazil)

Horacio's World is a Brazilian comic strip, part of the Monica and Friends comic strips. The main character is Horácio, a baby Tyrannosaurus rex, created in 1961. He debuted as one of the supporting characters of Pitheco's comics in The Cavern Clan, but their solo stories started in 1963. Other minor characters appear occasionally, but Horacio's strips mostly consist of monologues and self-reflections (some of them are even entirely pantomimic), thus making him Mauricios's alter-ego. Also, all his stories are written by Mauricio himself.

Some comics have also been published in Japan before between 1975 and 1982, but recently have been published again by the Sanrio's magazine Ichigo Shinbun.

== Characters ==
Horácio – Of this group of characters, Horácio (or Horacio in English) is the main one. He is the only character whose comic strips are still drawn and written exclusively by Mauricio, who sees him as his alter ego. Mauricio describes him as having an always optimistic view, as someone who likes to help his friends and, "sometimes, even the enemies. And he's got this calm, confident attitude." He is kind, friendly and concerned to help people around him. He has several friends. Horacio is also a carnivore, but insists on having a vegetarian diet. Horacio has a golden heart, is cheerful, wise, and eats only "alfacinhas" (small lettuce leaves) and is one of Mauricio de Sousa's most philosophical characters. He is very disputed by the dinosaurs Simone and Lucinda, who are both in love with him. Although he doesn't have an interest in either of them, he keeps them as good friends. His biggest dream is to meet his mother.

In his first stories, Horácio was described as a dinosaur who lived among the humans of The Cavern Clan. He was banned from the village for eating all their food and started to search for his mother, who abandoned him while he was in his egg. In most of his comic strips, he is reflecting about existence, or similar subjects. He does it mostly alone, but he also enjoys speaking to his few friends. Unlike common Tyrannosaurus stereotypes, he is very kind and friendly. He is also a vegetarian, having his very own lettuce crop near his cave. He is also constantly running away from Lucinda.

Supporting characters

- Lucinda – Lucinda is a natural dreamer and is constantly trying to date Horacio, who is definitely not interested in any relationship at the moment. She usually ends up angry at Horácio because of his flees, but she won't stop her attempts to date him.
- Theco (Tecodonte) – Horacio best friend, a baby thecodont.
- Mack Mammoth (Antão) – A baby mammoth.
- Terry Pterodactyl (Alfredo) – Terry is a Pterodactyl who looked after Horácio when he was a baby, but now, he is treated more like a friend than like a father. Horacio sometimes sits on his back to fly.
- Simone – Simone is Lucinda's best friend, but at the same time her main rival, because she is also in love with Horacio. However, Lucinda's attempts to date Horacio are much more frequent than Simone's.
- Brontson (Brontossauro, often abbreviated to Bronto) – Brontson is a big and strong Brontosaurus.
- The Napãos - A race of humanoid creatures characterized by having orange skin and huge noses who are friends of Horacio. They are led by a queen and live in a valley hidden from predators.

== Media ==
In 2018 a graphic novel based on Horacio's World characters entitled "Horácio: Mãe", was released as part of the Graphic MSP being made by Fabio Coala.
