= Janeen Brian =

South Australian writer

- Born: 1948 (age 77–78)
- Occupations: Children's author, former primary school teacher
- Writing career
- Genre: Children's literature
- Notable works: Pilawuk-When I Was Young; Where Does Thursday Go?; Hoosh! Camels in Australia
- Notable awards: CBCA Eve Pownall Honour Award (1997); CBCA Honour Book (2002); Speech Pathology Australia Book of the Year (2021)

Janeen Brian (born 1948) is a South Australian writer of children's books. A primary school teacher prior to 1990, when she started writing full time, she published her 100th book in September, 2016.

Brian's work for middle school children Yong: The Journey of an Unworthy Son has been adapted to a stage production by Monkey Baa Theatre Company, with shows in regional Victoria and the Sydney Opera House.

== Awards ==
- Pilawuk-When I Was Young won a CBCA Eve Pownall Honour Award 1997.
- Where Does Thursday Go? won a CBCA Honour Book 2002: Early Childhood for ages 2-6.
- Hoosh! Camels in Australia shortlisted in the CBCA Eve Pownall Award 2006.
- Look, Baby! won the 2021 Speech Pathology Australia Book of the Year for Birth to three years.

== Works ==
=== Children's books ===
- Pilawuk-When I Was Young (1996) Era Publications ISBN 1-86374-256-5
- Where Does Thursday Go? (2001) Scholastic Australia ISBN 1-876289-51-1
- Hoosh! Camels in Australia (2006) ABC Books ISBN 978-0-7333-1504-6
- Oddball (2008) Walker Books ISBN 978-1-921150-56-2
- That Boy, Jack (2013) Walker Books Australia ISBN 978-1-922179-00-5
- I'm A Dirty Dinosaur (2013) Penguin Books ISBN 978-0-670-07615-4
- I’m A Hungry Dinosaur (2015) Penguin Books ISBN 978-0-670-07810-3
- Yong Journey of an Unworthy Son (2016) Walker Books Australia ISBN 978-1-925126-29-7
- Eloise and the Bucket of Stars (2020) Walker Books Australia ISBN 978-1-76065-187-9
- The Fix-it Princess (2023) Walker Books Australia ISBN 978-1-76065-482-5
