= List of Max & Ruby episodes =

Max & Ruby is a Canadian animated children's television series based on the book series by Rosemary Wells. In Canada, the series debuted on Treehouse TV on September 10, 2002. In the United States, the series premiered on Nick Jr. on October 21, 2002, and on Noggin on August 16, 2004.

== Series overview ==
Season	Segments	Episodes	Originally released	
Season	Segments	Episodes	First released	Last released
Weston Woods shorts	2	2	October 7, 1988	January 15, 1992
1	39	13	September 10, 2002	February 14, 2003
2	39	13	July 8, 2003	April 27, 2004
3	42	14	October 27, 2006	May 2, 2007
4	36	12	June 15, 2009	November 3, 2009
5	78	26	December 10, 2011	February 11, 2013
6	50	26	September 18, 2016	September 24, 2018
7	50	26	August 12, 2018	April 9, 2020

== Episodes ==
=== Weston Woods shorts (1988–92) ===
Prior to the Nelvana series, two Max & Ruby books were adapted into animated short films directed by Michael Sporn, written by Rosemary Wells and produced by Weston Woods Studios and Michael Sporn Animation.

No. overall	No. in season	Title	Release date
1	1	"Max's Christmas"	October 7, 1988
In an adaptation of the book published in 1986, this is the first animation of Max and Ruby, who debuted in 1979. Max learns that Santa is coming as it is Christmas eve, but is intrigued by the notion that Santa is not to be seen, leading to him sneaking downstairs to meet him. He ends up with all the presents under his "lumpy and bulgy" blanket. Episode remade in TV series.
2	2	"Max's Chocolate Chicken"	January 15, 1992
Max and Ruby hunt for easter eggs left by the Easter bunny, but Max doesn't find any and steals the Chocolate Chicken left in the bird bath. Ruby beckons for him to come out and share, but he eats it all, and the Easter bunny leaves a Chocolate goose.

=== Season 1 (2002–03) ===
All episodes of Season 1 were directed by Jamie Whitney.

No. overall	No. in season	Title	Written by	Canadian air date	U.S. air date
1	1	"Ruby's Piano Practice"	Patrick Granleese	September 15, 2002	January 7, 2003
1	1	"Max's Bath"	Patrick Granleese	September 15, 2002	January 7, 2003
1	1	"Max's Bed Time"	Kate Barris	September 15, 2002	January 7, 2003
Ruby is practicing on the piano for the school concert and Max's toy fire truck is missing. Ruby tries to get Max to play with other toys until Ruby finds that Max's toy fire truck was in the piano. Max and Ruby eat lunch, but Max makes a mess, so Ruby decides to give him a bath. Max makes a mess in the bath with sherbet, so Ruby gives him a shower. Max shows that Ruby has 3 stains on her dress. Max can't sleep without his red rubber elephant, so Ruby tries to give him her toys to help him sleep. Later, Ruby accidentally falls asleep in his bed, and Max finds his elephant under his bed.
2	2	"Hide & Seek"	Patrick Granleese	September 10, 2002	October 21, 2002
2	2	"Max's Breakfast"	Kate Barris	September 10, 2002	October 21, 2002
2	2	"Louise's Secret"	Kate Barris	September 10, 2002	October 21, 2002
Max plays hide and seek with Ruby, but he will not let her have a turn to hide. Max won't eat his sunny-side-up egg and tries to hide it, wanting strawberries instead. Ruby won't let him eat the berries until the egg is gone. Max then manages to trick Ruby into eating the egg, so it's "gone" and Max can have the berries. Louise has a secret for Ruby on the telephone, but Max keeps interrupting with his noisy toys. Ruby eventually decides to move the call upstairs, but she relies on Max to keep the line open. Max hangs up before Ruby can pick it up, and she never learns, However, Max ends up finding out what it is, and he doesn't tell her because its a secret.
3	3	"Max Misses the Bus"	Kate Barris	September 17, 2002	January 8, 2003
3	3	"Max's Worm Cake"	Kate Barris	September 17, 2002	January 8, 2003
3	3	"Max's Rainy Day"	Kate Barris	September 17, 2002	January 8, 2003
Max and Ruby are visiting Louise's house, but Max wants to stay home with his toys. After Max makes them miss the bus so many times, Louise decides to come over to their house. Ruby wants to plant marigolds, but Max has chosen to make a "worm cake". He uses all her marigold-planting materials in his worm cake, which proves to be good for the marigolds. Max wants to play in the rain. By the time Ruby outfits Max and herself with rain gear, the rain has stopped, but Max puts the raincoats to good use with a garden hose.
4	4	"Camp Out"	Patrick Granleese	September 11, 2002	February 26, 2003
4	4	"Ruby's Clubhouse"	Kate Barris	September 11, 2002	February 26, 2003
4	4	"Max's Picnic"	Patrick Granleese	September 11, 2002	February 26, 2003
Max and Ruby are having a campout on a summer day but Max wants to sleep outside the tent. They do that after Max stuffs the tent with toys. Ruby and Louise build a clubhouse and they won't let Max in because it's personal, meaning girls-only. Later, Ruby builds Max his own clubhouse with a umbrella when eventually it starts to rain. Max doesn't let them have the umbrella because it's his private club. Ruby and Louise are bird watching for a speckled warbler but Max wants a cupcake. He manages to attract one with his cupcake.
5	5	"Max's Halloween"	Patrick Granleese	October 30, 2002	October 31, 2003
5	5	"Ruby's Leaf Collection"	Kate Barris	October 30, 2002	October 31, 2003
5	5	"The Blue Tarantula"	Patrick Granleese	October 30, 2002	October 31, 2003
Max wants to be a vampire for Halloween, but Ruby would rather have him dress up as a prince to go with her Cinderella costume. Ruby begins a collection of leaves but Max keeps getting in the way of finding the bigtooth aspen leaf. Ruby reads Max a scary story about a blue tarantula, which keeps him up all night. After he overcomes his fear, he frightens Ruby with his toy lobster.
6	6	"Ruby's Merit Badge"	Patrick Granleese	September 18, 2002	January 9, 2003
6	6	"Max's Apple"	Patrick Granleese	September 18, 2002	January 9, 2003
6	6	"Quiet Max"	Kate Barris	September 18, 2002	January 9, 2003
Ruby wants to earn her first aid merit badge and practices bandaging Max. Despite her failed practice, Ruby gets a merit badge, but not the one she expected. A song game on how to make apple pie inspires Max to want a barrel of apples to make his pie. Max and Ruby watch the Huffingtons' house while Baby Huffington is taking a nap, but Max wants to turn the radio on. While playing with a new doll, Ruby causes it to wake Huffington by mistake and cry.
7	7	"Max Cleans Up"	Patrick Granleese	September 22, 2002	January 13, 2003
7	7	"Max's Cuckoo Clock"	Kate Barris	September 22, 2002	January 13, 2003
7	7	"Ruby's Jewelry Box"	Kate Barris	September 22, 2002	January 13, 2003
Ruby wants to help Max tidy up his room and his popsicle melts all over his closet door, but Max stuffs the mess into his pocket instead. While Mrs. Huffington is at her backyard tea party, Ruby is to help Baby Huffington with his naptime, but suddenly Max keeps playing with the Huffingtons' cuckoo clock. However, it's not until Max activates the clock does the baby finally fall asleep. Ruby and Louise are making a tiara, but Max wants to look in Ruby's jewelry box and Ruby does not want him in her room. Ruby makes a "keep-out" sign that reads, "No! This means you!". But Max ignores the sign and he eventually spills jewelry on the floor, before using the sign to keep Ruby out.
8	8	"Bunny Cakes"	Kate Barris	September 24, 2002	January 15, 2003
8	8	"Bunny Party"	Kate Barris	September 24, 2002	January 15, 2003
8	8	"Bunny Money"	Patrick Granleese	September 24, 2002	January 15, 2003
Ruby sends Max to get ingredients for Grandma's Angel Surprise cake with raspberry fluff icing. After many trips, Max finally gets Red Hot Marshmallow Squirters for his earthworm cake. At Grandma's birthday party, Ruby has invited her dolls. To get his own toys into the party, Max disguises them as Ruby's dolls. Ruby wants to buy a birthday gift for Grandma, but her money gets wasted for Max's problems. Max and Ruby end up buying gifts they can afford.
9	9	"Max's Birthday"	Patrick Granleese	September 25, 2002	February 10, 2003
9	9	"Max's New Suit"	Patrick Granleese	September 25, 2002	February 10, 2003
9	9	"Goodnight Max"	Patrick Granleese	September 25, 2002	February 10, 2003
Max opens his last birthday gift to find a huge wind-up lobster but he prefers his wind-up chicks. But the lobster hunts and chases him all around the house, and when Ruby catches the lobster, Max finally decides he likes it after all. Ruby invites Max to her Bunny Scout party. Max initially does not want to wear his new suit, and after Ruby persuades him to, he puts it on the wrong way. Max keeps waking up to change his pajamas, because he does not like the ones he was wearing. He keeps dirtying the ones Ruby makes him wear until he eventually gets the pajamas he wants. Ruby then gives him her Walkie-Talkie Bear to sleep with.
10	10	"Max's Christmas"	Patrick Granleese	December 24, 2002	December 19, 2003
10	10	"Ruby's Snow Queen"	Kate Barris	December 24, 2002	December 19, 2003
10	10	"Max's Rocket Run"	Kate Barris	December 24, 2002	December 19, 2003
On Christmas Eve Max wants to stay up and see Santa Claus, but Ruby will not let him stay up. Max gets his chance to meet him as he delivers the gifts. The next day Ruby is surprised to see both Max and the gifts downstairs. Max wants to play with his new toy, a screaming green alien gorilla, while Ruby works on her Snow Queen. Then the gorilla vanishes, but Max finds it in the Snow Queen. Ruby and Louise are going sledding down the big hill called the Rocket Run. Max is told to go down the gentle slope, which is called Bunny Hill, but Max hitches a ride down by himself the Rocket Run with Ruby's toboggan and wins the day.
11	11	"Max's Chocolate Chicken"	Patrick Granleese	September 29, 2002	April 16, 2003
11	11	"Ruby's Beauty Shop"	Patrick Granleese	September 29, 2002	April 16, 2003
11	11	"Max Drives Away"	Kate Barris	September 29, 2002	April 16, 2003
Max is on an egg hunt, but gets an opportunity to take and eat a chocolate chicken all himself that the Easter Bunny left. Ruby is exasperated until the Easter Bunny gives her a chocolate duck. Ruby and Louise decide to pretend they own a salon, and Max is their customer. Max takes over when Grandma wants a makeover. Max decides to drive to Grandma's house in his toy car to have ice cream for breakfast and Ruby is hot on his trail playing detective.
12	12	"Ruby's Lemonade Stand"	Patrick Granleese	October 22, 2002	February 11, 2003
12	12	"Ruby's Rummage Sale"	Kate Barris	October 22, 2002	February 11, 2003
12	12	"Ruby's Magic Act"	Kate Barris	October 22, 2002	February 11, 2003
Ruby and Louise are making a lemonade stand for Bunny Scouts. After trying hard, Max gets a nickel to buy a glass for himself. Ruby and Louise are having a rummage sale, but Max wants to keep the toys Ruby and Louise want to give away. Grandma buys them back for Max. Ruby and Louise are performing a magic show, but Max is captivated by their magic box and almost spoils their secrets.
13	13	"Max's Valentine"	Patrick Granleese	February 14, 2003	February 14, 2003
13	13	"Ruby Flies a Kite"	Kate Barris	February 14, 2003	February 14, 2003
13	13	"Super Max"	James Backshall	February 14, 2003	February 14, 2003
Ruby and Louise make valentines. Max wants to make a valentine, but he's too young to use scissors and glue. Max mails a cherry-flavored Slime Dribbler to Grandma and comes back with Grandma and a cake. Ruby tries to fly a kite but Max wants to help Ruby fly her kite. Ruby wants to fly her kite by herself, but then her kite gets stuck in the tree. Suddenly, Max comes to rescue her kite with his toy helicopter. Ruby's doll, Sally Swims-A-Lot, is missing, and Max's alter-ego, Super Max, must look for her.

=== Season 2 (2003–04) ===
While all episodes of Season 2 were directed by Steven Boeckler, fourteen of them (1b through 2a, 3a, 3b, 4c, 5b through 6a, 7a & 7b, 8b, and 9a & 9b) were directed with Jamie Whitney.

No. overall	No. in season	Title	Directed by	Written by	Original air date
14	1	"Max's Work of Art"	Steven Boeckler	Patrick Granleese	July 8, 2003
14	1	"Max Meets Morris"	Steven Boeckler & Jamie Whitney	Kate Barris	July 8, 2003
14	1	"Ruby's Scavenger Hunt"	Steven Boeckler & Jamie Whitney	Briane Nasimok	July 8, 2003
After eating a fruit art model, Max poses for Ruby and Louise so they paint two pictures of him. Later, Max paints himself. Louise brings her little cousin, Morris, to meet Max, although they are unsettledly unsure at first. While Louise and Ruby make a banner for the Bunny Scout Picnic, Morris swipes Max's dump truck for himself and they later become best friends after shooting the banner using Max’s jellyball-spitting spider. In a Bunny Scout scavenger hunt, the last thing the Bunny Scouts need to find is a worm. Max finds a worm for the scavenger hunt.
15	2	"Ruby's Hiccups"	Steven Boeckler & Jamie Whitney	Shelley Hoffman & Robert Pincombe	July 15, 2003
15	2	"The Big Picture"	Steven Boeckler	Anita Kapila	July 15, 2003
15	2	"Ruby's Stage Show"	Steven Boeckler	Nicole Demerse	July 15, 2003
Ruby has the bad case of the hiccups and Max cannot find his monster mask. Grandma returns the mask to him and scares Ruby and Louise, in the process, removes Ruby's hiccups. Max and Ruby decide to take a picture to give to Grandma as a gift, but all Max wants to do is chase a butterfly. Ruby and Louise put on a stage show for Grandma, but Max wants to pretend to be a dragon. Grandma thinks Max and his dragon mask would be wonderful in the show.
16	3	"Max's Froggy Friend"	Steven Boeckler & Jamie Whitney	Kate Barris	July 22, 2003
16	3	"Max's Music"	Steven Boeckler & Jamie Whitney	Patrick Granleese	July 22, 2003
16	3	"Max Gets Wet"	Steven Boeckler	James Backshall	July 22, 2003
Max meets a frog, but Max and Ruby have to leave for a tea party they're having with Grandma. Max wants Froggy to come but Ruby thinks a tea party is no place for frogs. Ruby, Valerie, and Louise practice for the Bunny Scout Concert, playing "The Farmer in the Dell" as a trio, but Max keeps interrupting with his toy tools to play music with them. He soon ends up playing Whack-A-Mole, and Ruby lets him join the band as a quartet. Max and Ruby water the dried up garden, but Max would rather go play in his swimming pool than repair the garden, despite the fact that he had lunch and was told to wait a half-hour.
17	4	"Ruby's Tea Party"	Steven Boeckler	Nicole Demerse	July 29, 2003
17	4	"Max Is It"	Steven Boeckler	Patrick Granleese	July 29, 2003
17	4	"Ruby's Science Project"	Steven Boeckler & Jamie Whitney	James Backshall	July 29, 2003
Ruby wants to have a tea party with her dollies, but Max wants to play pirates. Things go awry when Ruby loses her Royal Princess Ruby Necklace, and Max uses Ruby's jewelry box as a treasure chest. At the park, Max is chosen to be "it" in a game of freeze tag. Ruby, Louise and Valerie are impossible for Max to tag. They proceed to taunt him, however, Max comes up with a plan, by stalking and ambushing them, to win the game and get his slime dribbler. Ruby and Louise are doing a science project and Max wants candy. Max actually wants sweets for a different reason than they thought.
18	5	"Ruby's Panda Prize"	Steven Boeckler	James Backshall	August 19, 2003
18	5	"Ruby's Roller Skates"	Steven Boeckler & Jamie Whitney	John Slama	August 19, 2003
18	5	"Ghost Bunny"	Steven Boeckler & Jamie Whitney	Kate Barris	August 19, 2003
At the fair, Max wants jelly balls, but Ruby wants to win a prize panda. But with so many bunnies winning the prize, she does not seem to get one until Max has an unexpectantlly change of heart, and wins one for her. Ruby wants to learn how to roller-skate and is interrupted by Max, who wants his lost Tow-A-Ton Tow Truck. The Bunny Scouts are camping, telling ghost stories around the campfire, complemented by s'mores. Max wants to hear the stories, but Ruby thinks they're too scary for him.
19	6	"Max's Bug Salad"	Steven Boeckler & Jamie Whitney	John Slama	October 2, 2003
19	6	"Ruby's Beach Party"	Steven Boeckler	James Backshall	October 2, 2003
19	6	"Super Max to the Rescue!"	Steven Boeckler	James Backshall	October 2, 2003
After making good friends with a ladybug, Max adds some candy bugs to the gelatin salad that Ruby makes for Grandma's tea party. Ruby is given full credit for making the salad, but she is shocked to see the candy bugs in the salad. Ruby and Louise want to have a beach party in Max and Ruby's sandbox while they wait for their swimming pool to warm up, only for Max and Morris to choose the same place to play with their dump trucks, and a dispute over the area breaks out. Ruby and Louise play circus in the yard using their dolls and, without asking, takes Max's red rubber elephant. Meanwhile, Max plays "Super Bunny" but needs to retrieve his red rubber elephant.
20	7	"Max's Dragon Shirt"	Steven Boeckler & Jamie Whitney	Patrick Granleese	October 9, 2003
20	7	"Max's Rabbit Racer"	Steven Boeckler & Jamie Whitney	James Backshall	October 9, 2003
20	7	"Roger's Choice"	Steven Boeckler	Kate Barris	October 9, 2003
Max and Ruby go to the shopping mall to buy Max new overalls with the five dollars she has, but Max wants a dragon T-shirt. Max sneaks away with a shirt and messes it up with ice cream so Ruby just has to buy it. Max plays with his Rabbit Racer, and is idolized by Baby Huffington, while Ruby and Louise learn baton-twirling with Mrs. Huffington. Max's Rabbit Racer cars interrupt Ruby and Louise's practice. Ruby’s baton gets stuck on top of the roof, but Max rescues it with his Rabbit Racer plane. Ruby and Louise want to play with Roger but Max wants Roger to play cars with him. Eventually, Roger feels happier playing cars with Max, who looks up to him as an idol.
21	8	"Ruby's Pajama Party"	Steven Boeckler	Patrick Granleese	October 16, 2003
21	8	"Baby Max"	Steven Boeckler & Jamie Whitney	Patrick Granleese	October 16, 2003
21	8	"Bunny Scout Brownies"	Steven Boeckler	James Backshall	October 16, 2003
Ruby, Louise, and Valerie are having a pajama party. Max wants to crash the party, but it's a pajama party for girl bunnies only. Ruby eventually gives up and lets Max in. Louise and Ruby force Max to pretend to be a baby, but Max does not want to; he'd rather go on the playground slide. Later, Louise and Ruby fall asleep singing Max a lullaby, allowing him to sneak away to the slide. Ruby is selling brownies for Bunny Scouts, but Max keeps eating them.
22	9	"Max's Shadow"	Steven Boeckler & Jamie Whitney	James Backshall	October 23, 2003
22	9	"Max Remembers"	Steven Boeckler & Jamie Whitney	Patrick Granleese	October 23, 2003
22	9	"Ruby's Candy Store"	Steven Boeckler	Kate Barris	October 23, 2003
Ruby and Valerie are trying to make a ballerina poster, but it is not working out. Max is playing with his shadow, which keeps disappearing in the sun. Later, Mr. Huffington shows him something. Max cannot remember why he has tied a string to his finger. Ruby looks around the house for chores and ends up doing them for Max and it turns out Max's string was for a yo-yo. Ruby helps Candi at the candy store, but unfortunately she ends up eating too much candy.
23	10	"Max's Check Up"	Steven Boeckler	James Backshall	October 30, 2003
23	10	"Max's Prize"	Steven Boeckler	Patrick Granleese	October 30, 2003
23	10	"Space Max"	Steven Boeckler	James Backshall	October 30, 2003
Ruby and Louise play doctor. Max is forcefully chosen as the patient, but he just wants to play with his markers. At the end, Max has red spots all over and it turns out to be from his markers. Ruby and Louise look for special things for Ruby's charm bracelet. Max finishes a box of cereal to get a prize, just the thing Ruby needs to complete her charm bracelet. Ruby, Valerie, and Louise are going to make a Princess float for the Bunny Scout Parade, but Max wants to pretend to be an astronaut.
24	11	"Ruby's Figure Eight"	Steven Boeckler	John Slama	April 13, 2004
24	11	"Ruby's Surprise Party"	Steven Boeckler	Briane Nasimok	April 13, 2004
24	11	"Ruby's Tent"	Steven Boeckler	Kate Barris	April 13, 2004
Ruby and Louise go ice-skating and try to make figure-eights while Max wants to play hockey with Roger and the other boy bunnies. Max is sent to look out for Louise approaching her surprise party, but Max keeps making false alarms, almost spoiling Louise's surprise. Ruby and Valerie want to make a tent to earn a Bunny Scout merit badge, but Max gets in the way playing Super Bunny.
25	12	"Ruby Writes a Story"	Steven Boeckler	Shelley Hoffman & Robert Pincombe	April 20, 2004
25	12	"Max's Dominoes"	Steven Boeckler	Shelley Hoffman & Robert Pincombe	April 20, 2004
25	12	"Grandma's Attic"	Steven Boeckler	James Backshall	April 20, 2004
Ruby wants to write a story, but Max wants to play cowboy, which later helps Ruby with the beginning of Ruby's story. Max and Morris want to play dominoes as Louise and Ruby try to practice a hospitality meeting. The dominoes prove to make a terrific welcome for the Bunny Scouts. Max is curious to look inside a treasure box in Grandma's attic and wants to open it, but Ruby thinks he's not allowed to and forbids him. Max finds the key to the treasure box in a shoe, opening the chest and Grandma shows them something special inside.
26	13	"Max's Thanksgiving"	Steven Boeckler	Kate Barris	April 27, 2004
26	13	"Max's Pretend Friend"	Steven Boeckler	Patrick Granleese	April 27, 2004
26	13	"Fireman Max"	Steven Boeckler	James Backshall	April 27, 2004
Max wants to eat Grandma's famous stuffing. By the time Ruby has finished decorating, Max has eaten all the stuffing and is too full to have Thanksgiving dinner. Ruby thinks that Max has a pretend friend when Max plays with Froggy and Ruby cannot see him. Max is pretending to be a fireman while Ruby and Louise practice Bunny Scout Jump Rope.

=== Season 3 (2006–07) ===
All episodes of Season 3 were directed by Jamie Whitney.

No. overall	No. in season	Title	Written by	Original release date
27a	1a	"Ruby's Easter Bonnet"	Patrick Granleese	December 5, 2006
Ruby is making an Easter Bonnet for the Bunny Scout Easter Bonnet contest, while Max tries to train Froggy to hop like a bunny.
27b	1b	"Max's Easter Parade"	Kate Barris	December 5, 2006
Ruby is decorating Easter Eggs but Max wants to see an Easter parade. Ruby explains that there is not an Easter Parade, and asks Max to take each egg as she finishes it and puts it in a basket to show Grandma.
27c	1c	"Max and the Easter Bunny"	Kate Barris	December 5, 2006
The Bunny Scouts are doing the annual Easter Egg Hunt. Max plays the Easter Bunny hiding the same eggs many times, so that the Egg Hunt starts again.
28a	2a	"Ruby's Hippity Hop Dance"	Shelley Hoffman & Robert Pincombe	November 22, 2006
Ruby and Louise try to learn the Hippity Hop Dance, while Roger teaches Max how to play football and Ruby and Louise see that Max and Roger's victory dance is the Hippity Hop Dance.
28b	2b	"Ruby's Bird Bath"	Patrick Granleese	November 22, 2006
Ruby makes an environmentally correct birdbath for a Bunny Scout merit badge, but Max keeps putting bath toys in it.
28c	2c	"Super Max Saves the World!"	James Backshall	November 22, 2006
Max (as Super Bunny) and Morris (as Zoom-Zoom) pretend to be superheroes while Ruby and Louise make a science project.
29a	3a	"Ruby Delivers"	Patrick Granleese	February 6, 2007
Ruby must make and deliver some fliers for Bunny Scout cupcakes. Max thinks that his toy planes are "fliers" which help in Ruby's task.
29b	3b	"Getting Crabby at the Beach"	John Mein	February 6, 2007
Ruby collects seashells, but does not notice when Max tries to tell her about a mischievous crab. However, the crab has dug a tidal pool for them.
29c	3c	"Max Baby Sits"	Shelley Hoffman & Robert Pincombe	February 6, 2007
Max and Ruby go to the Huffingtons' house to look after Baby Huffington, who seems to like loud toys instead of quiet sounds.
30a	4a	"Max's Fire Flies"	Patrick Granleese	February 20, 2007
Max wants to catch and study fireflies while Ruby and Louise decide to see the 4th of July fireworks.
30b	4b	"Max and Ruby's Fashion Show"	Shelley Hoffman & Robert Pincombe	February 20, 2007
Ruby and Louise start their own fashion show, Max dresses up as a pirate. Grandma thinks his pirate outfit is great in the fashion show and tops it off with a plastic parrot.
30c	4c	"Ruby's Sing Along"	James Backshall	February 20, 2007
Ruby wants to sing and play the piano at the same time for a talent show. Ruby does not think Max's wind-up toy animals can sing, until they help out with a song called "Max and Ruby Had a Farm", which is their version of Old MacDonald Had a Farm.
31a	5a	"Ruby's Safari"	James Backshall	February 27, 2007
Ruby and Louise go on a safari, but Max scares them with his animal toys. By chance, they take a picture of a hummingbird.
31b	5b	"Max's Mud Bath"	Patrick Granleese	February 27, 2007
Ruby and Louise have set up the beauty shop again, with Max as their customer, but Max just wants to play in the mud after they force him out of it.
31c	5c	"Max's Lost Lizard"	Shelley Hoffman & Robert Pincombe	February 27, 2007
Ruby and Louise worry when their chameleon gets out of its case, while Max enjoys studying it and watching it change color and patterns.
32a	6a	"Surprise, Ruby!"	Kate Barris	March 21, 2007
It's Ruby's birthday party. Ruby awaits a surprise party at their home, but Max makes off with her birthday princess tiara.
32b	6b	"Ruby's Birthday Party"	Kate Barris	March 21, 2007
Ruby's friends throw her a birthday party at Grandma's house. Max wants cake but Ruby insists they must play some party games before they eat cake.
32c	6c	"Ruby's Birthday Present"	Patrick Granleese	March 21, 2007
Ruby opens her birthday gifts and saves the pretty wrapping paper. Max tries to wrap a present for Ruby, but gets stuck in the wrapping paper, making him the perfect gift.
33a	7a	"Ruby's Puppet Show"	Kate Barris	April 4, 2007
Max attempts to get a role in Ruby and Louise's puppet show of "Mary Had a Little Lamb".
33b	7b	"Sugar Plum Max"	Patrick Granleese	April 4, 2007
Ruby and Louise want to practice Swan Lake but they practice Tchaikovsky’s Dance of the Sugar Plum Fairy from The Nutcracker, while Max tries various attempts to get a sugarplum without being thwarted.
33c	7c	"Max's Ant Farm"	Patrick Granleese	April 4, 2007
Max and Ruby are on a chase to get Max's ants back in the ant farm, before Ruby's party guests notice.
34a	8a	"Ruby's Loose Tooth"	James Backshall	October 27, 2006
Ruby loses a tooth and cannot find it. In the end, it turns out to be stuck in her muffin.
34b	8b	"Ruby Scores!"	James Backshall	October 27, 2006
Ruby tries to play soccer, but Max's robots are in the way.
34c	8c	"Ruby's Sand Castle"	Shelley Hoffman & Robert Pincombe	October 27, 2006
Ruby wants to make a sandcastle, but Max wants to go swimming.
35a	9a	"Grandma's Berry Patch"	James Backshall	April 25, 2007
Max and Ruby pick raspberries, blueberries, and blackberries so Grandma can make her special surprise berry recipe. But Max mixes the berries with his toy cement mixer truck, spoiling Grandma's surprise.
35b	9b	"Ruby's Bunny Scout Banner"	Kate Barris	April 25, 2007
Ruby and Louise paint a banner for their Bunny Scout parade, while Max's interruptions help them progress.
35c	9c	"Ruby's Detective Agency"	Shelley Hoffman & Robert Pincombe	April 25, 2007
Grandma has a surprise for Ruby, but before Ruby can go to Grandma's house she must solve the mystery of the missing Mrs. Quack.
36a	10a	"Max's Rocket Racer"	Patrick Granleese	May 2, 2007
Max wants to go on Mr. Piazza's Rocket Racer ride, but Max is below the required height line, so he tries many ways to look taller, until Mr. Piazza gives him an alternative ride.
36b	10b	"Max and Morris Blast Off!"	James Backshall	May 2, 2007
Ruby and Louise make preparations for Bunny Scout Leader's birthday party. The meeting gets that extra special touch when Max and Morris' "help".
36c	10c	"Max's Candy Apple"	Kate Barris	May 2, 2007
At the Easter Bunny Hop Fall Fair, Ruby insists she and Max participate in some races first to win a prize, but Max has his sights set on a candy apple, and tries to avoid Ruby.
37	11	"Max & Ruby's Bunnytales"	James Backshall (segs. a and c) Patrick Granleese (seg. b)	May 21, 2007
A special episode that features three segments related to fairy tales. Ruby Riding Hood: Ruby wants to bring cookies to Grandma's House, but Max wants to eat them, so Ruby tells him the story of Little Ruby Riding Hood and the Big Max Wolf. Max and the Beanstalk: Max is not to keen on his dinner: green beans. Ruby tells him a tale about how beans are good for him. The Froggy Prince: Ruby and Louise are putting on a fairy tale show while Max is playing with Froggy.
38a	12a	"Max and Ruby's Perfect Pumpkin"	James Backshall	April 10, 2007
Max and Ruby find a perfect pumpkin for Halloween in Mr. Piazza's store. Each time Ruby selects a pumpkin, Max distracts her and someone steals the pumpkin.
38b	12b	"Max's Jack 'O' Lantern"	John Slama	April 10, 2007
Max and Ruby dress up for a Halloween party at their home Ruby is dressed as a Fairy Godmother and Max is a vampire again. Ruby tells Max to design a pumpkin face for Grandma to carve, but Ruby insists it must be a happy, smiley pumpkin.
38c	12c	"Max's Big Boo!"	Patrick Granleese	April 10, 2007
Max and Ruby prepare to go trick-or-treating. Max tries every method to scare Ruby, but Ruby knows all his tricks.
39a	13a	"Grandma's Present"	Kate Barris	November 8, 2006
Ruby wants to buy Grandma a boa for Christmas and Max plays with cowboy toys, but Grandma buys it for Ruby and Max buys Grandma a cowboy hat and a lasso.
39b	13b	"Max and Ruby's Christmas Tree"	Shelley Hoffman & Robert Pincombe	November 8, 2006
Ruby wants to put some ornamental decorations on the Christmas tree, but Max wants to hang up his toys. Ruby forgets to put the star on the tree topper, but Max takes care of that with a pinwheel.
39c	13c	"Max's Snow Plow"	James Backshall	November 8, 2006
Ruby tries to shovel the snow off the lawn to make room for Grandma to get to their house, but Max's toy car turns out to be easier.
40a	14a	"Max's Snow Day"	Kate Barris	March 14, 2007
Max wants to go outside in the snow, but there is a blizzard.
40b	14b	"Max's Snow Bunny"	Shelley Hoffman & Robert Pincombe	March 14, 2007
Max tries to find out if the Abominable Snow Bunny is real.
40c	14c	"Max's Mix Up"	John Slama	March 14, 2007
Max wants to continue sledding, but Ruby wants to play dress-up with her dolls. When Louise and Morris come over, Max sees that Morris is sledding at the same time. So Max switches his snow clothes with Morris. Note: This is the last time Billy Rosemberg voices Max.

=== Season 4 (2009) ===
All episodes of Season 4 were directed by Jamie Whitney.

No. overall	No. in season	Title	Written by	Original release date
41a	1a	"Grandma's Treasure Hunt"	Kate Barris	June 15, 2009
Ruby and Louise are going on a treasure hunt set up by Grandma. Max wants to make it a pirate treasure hunt.
41b	1b	"Ruby's Jigsaw Puzzle"	Patrick Granleese	June 15, 2009
Ruby is assembling a jigsaw puzzle, but Max's wind-up lobster swipes one of the pieces. Max chases it all over the house and hunts it down to retrieve it.
41c	1c	"Ruby's Recital"	Shelley Hoffman & Robert Pincombe	June 15, 2009
Grandma calls up Ruby and suggests a music recital in the garden. Ruby cannot find an instrument she wants to play, but then finds out the recital is for her.
42a	2a	"Ruby's Home Run"	James Backshall	July 2, 2009
Ruby and her friends are playing baseball. This is Ruby's first time playing and it seems Max and his toy airplanes are not making the game any easier.
42b	2b	"Ruby's Missing Tune"	Patrick Granleese	July 2, 2009
Ruby and Louise are practicing their ballet that they're going to put on for Grandma. Max would rather play in his race car. When he breaks Ruby's boombox by accident, he helps them with the music, causing Ruby to remember the tune of Strauss' Blue Danube Waltz.
42c	2c	"Ruby's Hand Stand"	Kate Barris	July 2, 2009
Ruby and Louise are working to earn their Gymnastics badge and in order to earn it, they have to do a handstand for 5 whole seconds. Max wants to play on the swings.
43a	3a	"Ruby's Rainbow"	Louise Moon	August 12, 2009
Ruby is trying to make a rainbow painting for Grandma, but Max keeps trying to get outside.
43b	3b	"Home Tweet Home"	Bernice Vanderlaan	August 12, 2009
Ruby and Louise are making a birdhouse for the birds, but Max keeps asking for snacks. Max took Ruby's spool of thread by accident but adds a ribbon instead.
43c	3c	"Max's Mudpie"	Kate Barris	August 12, 2009
Max wants to make a mud pie. Ruby wants him to stay clean, because Grandma's coming over with a treat.
44a	4a	"Max Saves the Parade"	Shelley Hoffman & Robert Pincombe	October 20, 2009
Ruby and Louise are making a float for the Fall Fun Festival Parade. Max and Roger are making one as well, but when both pairs clash, Max and Roger decide to combine the floats into one.
44b	4b	"Max's Big Kick"	James Backshall	October 20, 2009
Roger is teaching Max how to kick a football while Ruby and Louise make a leaf collage, but somehow the park does not seem big enough for the four of them.
44c	4c	"Ruby's Horn of Plenty"	Kate Barris	October 20, 2009
It is the fall and Ruby is picking vegetables to decorate her cornucopia, but Max would rather eat them instead.
45a	5a	"Duck Duck Goose"	Bernice Vanderlann	September 22, 2009
After a game of duck, duck, goose in the park with Max, Ruby, Louise and Valerie look for some winter birds, which Max finds first but Ruby just thinks he wants to keep playing the game.
45b	5b	"Ruby's Snowbunny"	James Backshall	September 22, 2009
Max and Ruby have made a beautiful snow bunny. Now Ruby has to find somewhere safe from the tobogganing.
45c	5c	"Ruby's Snowflake"	Patrick Granleese	September 22, 2009
Ruby has made snowflake cookies for herself, Max and Grandma. Max tries to take one while a stingy and selfish Ruby decorates them, until Grandma teaches her the importance of sharing.
46a	6a	"Ruby's Good Neighbour Report"	Shelley Hoffman & Robert Pincombe	October 6, 2009
Ruby is writing a report for Bunny Scouts about good neighbors; she asks various neighbors who she should write about and finds her subject: Firechief Max in the neighborhood and he is the hero by saving everyone.
46b	6b	"Candy Counting"	Rose Tavelli	October 6, 2009
Max and Ruby go to Candi's store. Ruby tries to count a jar of gummy worms to win it, while Max interrupts her.
46c	6c	"Ruby's New Shoes"	James Backshall	October 6, 2009
Max, Ruby and Grandma are shopping for new shoes. Max desperately wants to see Super Bunny, who is making an appearance in the store.
47a	7a	"Max's Balloon Buddies"	Shelley Hoffman & Robert Pincombe	August 26, 2009
Max and Ruby are at the fair. Mr. Huffington gives Max a balloon animal but he keeps losing it by popping, letting go while floating away, and deflating. Ruby wants to see the flower show and eventually, the fair closes.
47b	7b	"Ruby's Penny Carnival"	Bernice Vanderlann	August 26, 2009
Ruby and her friends are having a penny carnival to make money for an excursion, but Max would rather make a monster house instead. At the end, Max makes them a makeshift horror house in the garden shed to scare them.
47c	7c	"Ruby's Big Win"	Patrick Granleese	August 26, 2009
Max and Ruby go to a nearby fun fair. Ruby wants to win a goldfish by shooting a basketball through a hole, but she keeps failing. However, Max wins many prizes, but when he wins his last prize and Ruby has one more chance to win her goldfish, he intentionally runs into Ruby, causing her to shoot the ball into the hole, and Ruby wins her goldfish. Max then finds his prize useful for Ruby's fish bowl.
48a	8a	"Ruby's Gingerbread House"	Shelley Hoffman & Robert Pincombe	July 14, 2009
Ruby and Louise are trying to build a gingerbread house by sticking the walls, but Max and his gummy worms keep getting in the way, sometimes scaring the girls but knocks over the icing sugar and stomping it down.
48b	8b	"Max's Christmas Passed"	Shelley Hoffman & Robert Pincombe	July 14, 2009
As Christmas passed, Ruby is disappointed, but intends to take the decorations off, but Max has a surprise in store for Ruby.
48c	8c	"Max's New Year"	Kate Barris	July 14, 2009
Max and Ruby go to Grandma's House for New Year's Eve. Max wants to eat cookies before midnight, but Ruby keeps abusively stopping him.
49a	9a	"Max's Castle"	Kate Barris	October 8, 2009
Ruby and Louise are making a castle out of blocks, but Max keeps on adding more and more blocks.
49b	9b	"Bunny Hopscotch"	Kate Barris	October 8, 2009
Ruby and Louise are trying to play hopscotch, but Max keeps annoying them by using stones.
49c	9c	"Max's Grasshopper"	Kate Barris	October 8, 2009
Ruby and Louise are trying to measure the bean plants for the experiment, and Max has a grasshopper named Hoppy. This gave Ruby and Louise an idea.
50a	10a	"Ruby's Hoola Hoop"	Patrick Granleese	September 9, 2009
Louise is trying to teach Ruby how to use a hula hoop, but Max and his wind-up bugs keep distracting her.
50b	10b	"Max and the Martians"	Louise Moon	September 9, 2009
Ruby, Louise, and Valerie are stargazing for Mars to earn their Astronomy badge from Bunny Scout Leader. Max releases a horde of wind-up Martians and ends up helping the girls out.
50c	10c	"Ruby's Real Cinderella"	Patrick Granleese	September 9, 2009
Ruby and Louise are playing Cinderella. A particularly messy and grubby Max wants to play, but the girls will not let him with oozing vampire teeth and mop with dust. When Grandma comes over with the glass slippers, only Max's paws fit them.
51a	11a	"Super Max's Cape"	Patrick Granleese	November 3, 2009
In the park, Mr. and Mrs. Huffington ask Max and Ruby to watch their baby for a bit. Max wants to play Super Bunny, while Ruby thinks they should play quietly, but Baby Huffington wants to play Super Bunny with Max.
51b	11b	"Ruby's Water Lily"	Louise Moon	November 3, 2009
Ruby, Louise, Martha and Valerie are showing Grandma their synchronized swimming routine, while Roger takes Max swimming. Max's water toys hinder their practice, but help with their final routine.
51c	11c	"Max Says Goodbye"	Kate Barris	November 3, 2009
Max and Ruby are going to Louise's for the whole day. Ruby gives Max a backpack for the toys he wants to take with him and tells him he has to say goodbye to the rest and his vampire teeth. After rushing around the house saying goodbye to the toys he is not taking, Grandma shows up and offers to stay home with Max to play pirates together, so he says goodbye to Ruby instead.
52	12	"Max & Ruby's Bunnytales 2"	James Backshall	July 28, 2009
This serves as the second installment of the "Max and Ruby's Bunny Tales" series, but otherwise the formatting in this episode is the same as the first installment. The Princess and the Marbles: Ruby tells Max the story of The Princess and the Marbles after Max interrupts Ruby's princess game while humming the "La donna è mobile" from Verdi's opera Rigoletto. Emperor Max's New Suit: Ruby and Grandma takes Max to the store to get him a new suit, but he does not want one. Ruby tells him the story of Emperor Max's New Suit to get him to try on some clothes, but it does not quite have the effect she was hoping for. Max and the Three Little Bunnies: Ruby, Louise, and Valerie are playing with paper dolls, but Max tears their house with his blimp toy. Ruby tells him the story of The Big Max Wolf and the 3 Little Bunnies and Max uses his blimp to make a new house out of toy bricks.

=== Season 5 (2011–13) ===
This is the last season to be directed by Jamie Whitney.

No. overall	No. in season	Title	Written by	Original release date
53a	1a	"Ruby's Perfect Christmas Tree"	Kate Barris	December 10, 2011
Ruby wants to find the perfect Christmas tree at Santa's Treeland.
53b	1b	"Max's Christmas Presents"	Shelley Hoffman & Robert Pincombe	December 10, 2011
When it comes to Christmas presents, Max knows whom to ask... Santa! While Ruby makes Christmas tree decorations.
53c	1c	"Max and Ruby's Christmas Carol"	Kate Barris	December 10, 2011
Max is in charge of ringing his little bell while Ruby, Louise & Valerie are caroling, but Max rings the big bell, calling the whole town to watch the carolers.
54a	2a	"Max Says Hello"	Kate Barris	January 23, 2012
Ruby picks Max up from Grandma's house and the two return home following Ruby's playdate at Louise's house. Max wants to say hello to and play with his toys, but Ruby tells him to put them away before Louise comes over to continue her and Ruby's playdate at Max & Ruby's house.
54b	2b	"Ruby's Spa Day"	Andrew Sabiston	January 23, 2012
Ruby makes her own spa for her and Louise, but Max wants to play his one bunny marching band drum, which keeps interrupting the girls, who keep forcefully taking it away from him and upset him, until he finally sneaks it back from them.
54c	2c	"Ruby's Tai Chi"	Patrick Granleese	January 23, 2012
Ruby tries to practice Tai Chi with her friends to earn a Bunny Scout Martial Arts badge, but Max's toys are interfering.
55a	3a	"Ruby Gets the Picture"	Andrew Sabiston	January 24, 2012
Bunny Scouts Ruby and Louise get unexpected help from Max and his new animal friend Stick in their hunt for an unusual insect.
55b	3b	"Ruby's Birdie"	David Dias	January 24, 2012
Max's rocket launches interrupt Ruby's quest to achieve her best in badminton.
55c	3c	"Max Plays Catch"	David Dias	January 24, 2012
Max's game of catch with Roger threatens to ruin Ruby's garden party with Grandma!
56a	4a	"Ruby's Bedtime Story"	Patrick Granleese	January 25, 2012
Ruby wants to finish reading her bunny version of the Nancy Drew books, but Max keeps stopping the story.
56b	4b	"Ruby's Amazing Maze"	Andrew Sabiston	January 25, 2012
Ruby is making a maze for Grandma, but Max's train keeps getting in the way.
56c	4c	"Max's Night Light"	Patrick Granleese	January 25, 2012
On a camping trip in Loon Lake, Max needs a night light - and he gets one in an unexpected & beautiful way!
57a	5a	"Max's Sandwich"	John Slama	January 26, 2012
Ruby loves trying the exotic food at the multicultural fair, but Max wants a sandwich.
57b	5b	"Max's Ice Cream Cone"	Dave Dias	January 26, 2012
Ruby wants to make a special treat for Grandma, but Max keeps using the ingredients to make an ice cream cone.
57c	5c	"Ruby's Art Stand"	Patrick Granleese	January 26, 2012
On a hot summer day, Ruby wants to sell her art, while Max wants to stay cool.
58a	6a	"Picture Perfect"	Meghan Read	February 13, 2012
Ruby needs Max to stop making silly faces so they can take a picture for Grandma.
58b	6b	"Detective Ruby"	Patrick Granleese	February 13, 2012
One morning at Dawn, Max is hunting, ambushing and stalking, until his wind up lobster starts hunting and chasing him, instead. Then Ruby informs him that some of her belongings have mysteriously vanished. To track down her missing things, Ruby becomes her detective heroine, Nancy Drew, while Max's wind up lobster provides a clue.
58c	6c	"Superbunny Saves the Cake"	Craig Martin	February 13, 2012
Ruby is making a birthday cake for Grandma; meanwhile, Max gives a revamp to his Super Max alter-ego.
59	7	"Max and Ruby's Bunnytales 3"	Craig Martin (seg. a) James R. Backshall (segs. b and c)	February 14, 2012
The Bunny Who Cried Lobster: Ruby does not believe who took her cake. She tells Max the tale of "The Bunny Who Cried Wolf". Max and the Three Bears: Max is uninvited to Ruby's Pajama party. She tells him the tale of "Max and the Three Bears". Little Ruby Hen: Max is not helping Ruby. She tells him the tale of "The Little Ruby Hen".
60a	8a	"Ruby's Bird Walk"	Patrick Granleese	February 15, 2012
Max keeps trying to eat the popcorn that Ruby and her friends need to attract a Loon Lake skylark and earn a Bird Watching Badge, when they all get lost and Max pins the blame on Ruby and her friends.
60b	8b	"Max Goes Fishing"	Patrick Granleese	February 15, 2012
While Ruby tries to earn her Canoeing Badge during a canoeing competition in Loon Lake, while Max wants to fish and tries to catch a "big one".
60c	8c	"Ruby Tries Again"	Kate Barris	February 15, 2012
Ruby must build a campfire to earn a Scout Badge before dark in Loon Lake, but Max's tire swing gets in the way!
61a	9a	"Max's Ride"	Meghan Read	February 16, 2012
Ruby wants to see everything on her trip to London, England. Max just wants to go on the rides.
61b	9b	"Max on Guard"	Patrick Granleese	February 16, 2012
Max is on a mission to make a Royal Guard smile outside "Bunningham" Palace and take its picture, while Ruby hopes to catch a glimpse of the Queen.
61c	9c	"Ruby's Real Tea Party"	John Slama	February 16, 2012
Ruby hopes to see the Queen at a tea party at "Bunningham" Palace in London.
62a	10a	"Ruby's Earth Day Party"	Kim Thompson	April 21, 2012
Ruby wants to host a perfect Earth Day Costume Party, but Max wants to get dirty.
62b	10b	"Ruby's Earth Day Checklist"	Patrick Granleese	April 21, 2012
Ruby wants to do everything on her Earth Day checklist, while Max gets into nature and becomes a nature lover.
62c	10c	"Max's Ducky Day"	Shelley Hoffman & Robert Pincombe	April 21, 2012
While Ruby helps clean up the park for Earth Day, Max finds a duckling and tries to help reunite it with its mother.
63a	11a	"Grandma's Birthday"	Andrew Sabiston	May 11, 2012
Ruby wants to surprise Grandma on Grandma Appreciation Day.
63b	11b	"Max's Hand Print"	Katherine Sandford	May 11, 2012
Ruby wants to make a print of Max's hand for Grandma.
63c	11c	"Grandma's Surprise Dance"	Kim Thompson	May 11, 2012
Ruby wants to throw Grandma a beautiful waltzing dance party.
64a	12a	"Engineer Max"	Shelley Hoffman & Robert Pincombe	May 14, 2012
Grandma wants Max and Ruby to get a big bow, while Max just wants to ride on the toy train. At the end, Ruby and Grandma surprise Max with the toy train as a gift.
64b	12b	"Max's Toy Train"	James R. Backshall	May 14, 2012
Ruby wants to get ready for a sleepover at Grandma's.
64c	12c	"Max's Train Ride"	Kate Barris	May 14, 2012
Ruby is throwing a tea party with her dolls, and can't wait until Grandma arrives. Max gives the dolls a train ride to where Ruby doesn't expect to have her tea party.
65a	13a	"Max's Kite"	James R. Backshall	June 1, 2012
Ruby wants to learn how beach volleyball is played. Max wants to fly his kite.
65b	13b	"Max's Beach Ball"	James R. Backshall	June 1, 2012
Max and Ruby are visiting the beach today! Ruby wants to makes a seashell necklace. Max wants to play with his beach ball.
65c	13c	"Ruby's Limbo"	Andrew Sabiston	June 1, 2012
Ruby wants to win the limbo contest at the beach in Hawaii, while Max just wants to play with his flying saucer.
66a	14a	"Ruby's Diorama"	Shelley Hoffman & Robert Pincombe	September 21, 2012
Ruby want to make a diorama of East Bunnyhop's Main Street parade. When Bunny Scout Leader arrives, she is thrilled with Ruby's diorama, especially the added touch of the Main Street parade.
66b	14b	"Ruby's Croquet Match"	Patrick Granleese	September 21, 2012
Ruby, Louise and Valerie play a game of croquet. Max is playing with his race cars, which keep interfering with the game. In the end, his race car ends up helping Ruby win the game.
66c	14c	"Ruby's Huff and Puff"	Shelley Hoffman & Robert Pincombe	September 21, 2012
Ruby and Louise try to earn their fitness badges while Roger teaches Max how to play basketball.
67a	15a	"Max's Pinata"	John Slama	October 10, 2012
Ruby gets Max to pick a souvenir from the All-Round The World Fair (Multicultural Fair), but Max wants to try hitting a pinata.
67b	15b	"Ruby's Movie Night"	Anita Kapila	October 10, 2012
Ruby invites Louise to her movie night and Max just wants to eat popcorn.
67c	15c	"Doctor Ruby"	Patrick Granleese	October 10, 2012
Ruby gives Grandma a check-up and gives her milk and cookies, and Max just wants to eat cookies, so he uses marker to put dots on his face so he can have cookies.
68a	16a	"Ruby's Tower"	Carol Commisso	October 11, 2012
While it is raining outside, Ruby is building a marshmallow and spaghetti tower as Max wants to find some things that "bounce" until Ruby runs out of spaghetti.
68b	16b	"Ruby's Juice Bar"	Carolyn Hay	October 11, 2012
Ruby and Louise are opening up a juice bar as Max wants to make music.
68c	16c	"Max's Tree Fort"	Andrew Sabiston	October 11, 2012
Max and Roger are building a tree fort while Ruby and Louise are taking pictures of animals.
69a	17a	"Max and the Magnet"	Carol Commisso	October 12, 2012
Ruby makes a special brooch for Grandma, while Max experiments with magnets.
69b	17b	"Ruby's Parrot Project"	Kate Barris	October 12, 2012
Ruby tries to teach Rosalinda's parrot, Pandora, to talk, but Max's toys get in the way.
69c	17c	"Max's Spaghetti"	Patrick Granleese	October 12, 2012
Max and Ruby make Grandma's kitchen look like a formal Italian restaurant, while Max wants to eat spaghetti before Mr. Piazza comes.
70a	18a	"Ruby's Autograph"	Patrick Granleese	October 22, 2012
Ruby wants to get an autograph from ballerina Bunny Pavlova similar to Anna Pavlova, while Max just wants to have a slice of pizza.
70b	18b	"A Toy for Baby Huffington"	Kim Thompson	October 22, 2012
Max and Ruby look for toys for Baby Huffington. Max wants to give him a robot, but Ruby insists to give him a safe one, and he ends up making his own robot.
70c	18c	"Max's Big Dig"	Patrick Granleese	October 22, 2012
Max, Ruby and Louise look for dinosaur bones.
71a	19a	"Max and Ruby's Train Trip"	Kate Barris	October 23, 2012
Max and Ruby go on the first train ride with Grandma in order to visit their Aunt Claire and Uncle Nate, and begin their quest of survival.
71b	19b	"Go to Sleep, Max!"	Kate Barris	October 23, 2012
Max wants to go to sleep in the upper berth in the sleeper car, with Ruby mistakenly believing he wanted to stay up.
71c	19c	"Conductor Max"	Patrick Granleese	October 23, 2012
Max helps the other passengers as he tries to get back Ruby's greeting card he lost in the conductor's hat to see Aunt Claire and Uncle Nate.
72a	20a	"Max's Red Rubber Elephant Mystery"	Patrick Granleese	October 24, 2012
When Max discovers that Ruby wants to solve a mystery, just like Bunny Drew, suddenly his Red Rubber Elephant goes missing. It's up to Ruby to solve the mystery. But when Ruby tells Grandma they can't go over for cookies till they find the Elephant, Max really wants Ruby to solve the mystery before something else happens!
72b	20b	"Ruby's Toy Drive"	Kate Barris	October 24, 2012
Ruby is trying to decide which toy to give away for the Bunny Scout Toy Drive, and suggests that Max should donate a toy, too. But while she’s trying to choose, Max and his lobster keep getting in the way.
72c	20c	"Max and Ruby's Big Finish"	Kate Barris	October 24, 2012
Ruby and the Bunny Scouts are getting ready for the Big Finish of the Annual East Bunnyhop Variety Show with a song called "Our Salute to the Neighborhood". But instead of remembering his cue, Max is intent on playing with this Jellyball Spitting Spider. To Ruby’s surprise, Max gives the show a bigger finish than she could have imagined.
73a	21a	"Ruby's Memory Quilt"	Anita Kapila	October 25, 2012
Max wants to play cowboy while Ruby and Louise create their memory quilt.
73b	21b	"Lights, Camera, Ruby!"	Patrick Granleese	October 25, 2012
Louise is making a movie about Ruby for Grandma, while Max does some tricks which get caught on camera.
73c	21c	"Ruby's Ping-Pong Record"	John Slama	October 25, 2012
Ruby and Louise attempt to break the East Bunnyhop Ping-Pong record, but Max keeps to using their Ping-Pong table as a pretend space station.
74a	22a	"Ruby and the Beast"	Meghan Read	October 26, 2012
Max and Ruby are searching Grandma's attic for things to make Halloween costumes out of. Ruby wants them to be two characters from a fairytale, but can’t decide which one. Max just wants to be scary, "Roar!". At the end, he helps her come up the perfect fairytale duo: Beauty (or Ruby) and the Beast. Ruby wants to decide what fairy tale characters they’ll be for Halloween. Max just wants to be scary!
74b	22b	"Max and Ruby's Halloween House"	James R. Backshall	October 26, 2012
Ruby wants to decorate the house for Halloween before the trick-or-treaters come, but Max keeps interrupting her because he wants to get to the bowl of candy. When the trick-or-treaters come, Ruby thinks she’s not ready, but it turns out Max has helped her create a great, scary Halloween witch. Ruby wants to decorate the house for Halloween, and Max just wants candy!
74c	22c	"Max's Trick or Treat"	Kate Barris	October 26, 2012
Ruby thinks it would be a fun idea to do a trick for all the homes they go trick-or-treating at. Max just wants all the treats he can get. But in the end, it turns out he's played the best trick of all. Ruby wants to do a trick for their Halloween treats. Max just wants treats.
75a	23a	"Max and Ruby Give Thanks"	Andrew Sabiston	November 19, 2012
It's Thanksgiving and Ruby is coming up with way to say "Thank you" to the important bunnies. Max keeps offering her messy, gooey things and saying, "Thank you".
75b	23b	"Max Leaves"	Garner Haines	November 19, 2012
Ruby is trying to create a winter costume for the Four Seasons presentation at the Fall Pageant by forcing Max to help.
75c	23c	"Ruby's Fall Pageant"	Kate Barris	November 19, 2012
Ruby, Louise and Valerie act as the four seasons for the Fall Pageant. However, when Martha, who is supposed to play Spring, falls ill, the girls desperately try to find a replacement for her.
76a	24a	"Ruby's Big Case"	Anita Kapila	January 28, 2013
Ruby and Louise read an old Bunny Drew novel of Grandma's, but are forced to investigate when pages of the book are gone.
76b	24b	"Ruby's Rhyme Time"	Kate Barris	January 28, 2013
Ruby is determined to win the Bunny Scout Poetry contest and takes Max out on a nature walk to be inspired. Max is inspired by the snacks that she’s packed for their expedition.
76c	24c	"Max's Library Card"	Patrick Granleese	January 28, 2013
Ruby pretends to be a librarian and lends out books, as Max pretends to be a magician. Max wants to borrow a book about stage magic, but Ruby will not left him borrow it without his library card.
77a	25a	"Max & Ruby's Groundhog Day"	James R. Backshall	January 30, 2013
Max and Ruby leave food for the local groundhog, East Bunnyhop Bill, but the groundhog is only eating the food that Max is leaving behind.
77b	25b	"Ruby's First Robin of Spring"	Talyana Terzopoulos	January 30, 2013
Ruby wants to clean up the backyard to welcome the first robin of spring, but Max only wants to play in the sandbox and build.
77c	25c	"Grandma's Geraniums"	Andrew Sabiston	January 30, 2013
Ruby is trying to plant geraniums in Grandma's garden, but Max keeps taking items that Ruby needs for planting, so that he can come up with his own big surprise for Grandma.
78a	26a	"Space Bunny"	James R. Backshall	February 11, 2013
Ruby goes to Grandma's attic to get some things to finish her scrapbook, while Max plays with outer space toys.
78b	26b	"Max's Sprinkler"	Patrick Granleese	February 11, 2013
Max wants to play with the sprinkler while Ruby and her friends are having a summer fashion show.
78c	26c	"Max's Pogo Stick"	Shelley Hoffman & Robert Pincombe	February 11, 2013
Ruby wants to surprise Grandma by planting daisies in her garden, while Max is trying to learn how to hop on a pogo stick. Note: This is the last time Tyler Stevenson voices Max, Rebecca Peters voices Ruby, Cameron Ansell voices Morris, Alexis Walla voices Valerie and Emily Scott voices Mrs. Huffington.

=== Season 6 (2016–18) ===
All episodes of Season 6 were directed by Derek Prout.

- This is the first season in which Max and Ruby's parents are seen. They were previously mentioned during the first five seasons.
- Episodes go by US broadcast number and not Canadian broadcast number.
- Max has become interested in dinosaurs and, inspired by many dinosaur film and TV shows, becomes a dinosaur expert.

No. overall	No. in season	Title	Written by	Canadian air date	U.S. air date	Prod. code	US viewers (millions)
79a	1a	"Max's Preschool"	Sheila Dinsmore	January 2, 2017	September 18, 2016	080a	0.61
Max creates a good impression on his new preschool class.
79b	1b	"Grandma's Story Time Sleepover"	Shelly Hoffman & Rob Pincombe	January 2, 2017	September 18, 2016	080b	0.61
Max and Ruby have a special camp out story extravaganza when Grandma comes to visit.
80a	2a	"Ruby's Teacher"	Sheila Dinsmore	January 4, 2017	September 18, 2016	081a	0.60
Ruby, Louise, and Valerie want to create a special card for their new teacher.
80b	2b	"Max's Art Time"	Sheila Dinsmore	January 4, 2017	September 18, 2016	081b	0.60
Max and his classmates paint self-portraits. Meanwhile, Ruby works as Miss Bunty's assistant helper for the day.
81a	3a	"Show and Tell"	Sheila Dinsmore	January 3, 2017	October 24, 2016	079a	0.69
Max wants to bring his toy Tin-Froggy to school for Show and Tell; however, Ruby tries to convince him to choose something else.
81b	3b	"The Whirligig"	Sheila Dinsmore	January 3, 2017	October 24, 2016	079b	0.69
While playing with Max's new Whirligig toy, Max & his classmate Lily help Ruby keep a flock of crows out of Ruby's garden.
82a	4a	"Max's Rocket"	Shelley Hoffman & Rob Pincombe	January 5, 2017	October 25, 2016	082a	0.70
Mr. Bunny gives Max & Ruby a cardboard box to share. Max wants to turn a cardboard box into a pretend rocket ship, but Ruby and Louise want to turn it into Rapunzel's Tower.
82b	4b	"Max! Bam! Boom!"	Patrick Granleese	January 5, 2017	October 25, 2016	082b	0.70
Max creates a one-bunny-band, giving Ruby, Louise, and Valerie something special for their talent show performance by singing "This Old Man".
83a	5a	"Max Whistles"	Sheila Dinsmore	January 6, 2017	October 26, 2016	083a	0.89
Max learns how to whistle.
83b	5b	"Ruby's Photo Op"	Jennifer Daley	January 6, 2017	October 26, 2016	083b	0.89
Ruby wants to take a perfect picture to give to Grandma for Grandparents Day.
84a	6a	"Grandma's Surprise"	Shelley Hoffman & Rob Pincombe	January 8, 2017	October 27, 2016	085a	0.86
Max tries to peek at a surprise Grandma left for the bunnies.
84b	6b	"Costume Day"	Jennifer Daley	January 8, 2017	October 27, 2016	085b	0.86
Max wants to be Super Bunny for the costume day, not a king.
85a	7a	"Max's Skateboard"	Shelley Hoffman & Rob Pincombe	April 3, 2017	November 1, 2016	086a	0.82
Max wants to learn to skateboard while Ruby sets up for a Bunny Scout meeting.
85b	7b	"Super Butterfly"	Bernice Vanderlaan	April 3, 2017	November 1, 2016	086b	0.82
Max's classmates, Morris, Lily, Priya, and Winston create butterfly wings, but Max wants to be a caterpillar.
86a	8a	"Ruby Juggles"	Stephen Senders	April 4, 2017	November 3, 2016	087a	0.84
Ruby learns to deal with Max's constant interruptions.
86b	8b	"Max and Priya"	Patrick Granleese	April 4, 2017	November 3, 2016	087b	0.84
Max discovers that being his fun, silly self is the best way to get shy Priya to open up.
87a	9a	"Dino Hunter Max"	Patrick Granleese	January 7, 2017	November 8, 2016	084a	1.01
Max disrupts Ruby's party, by digging in the backyard for dinosaur bones and fossils.
87b	9b	"Ruby's Solar System"	Sheila Dinsmore	January 7, 2017	November 8, 2016	084b	1.01
Max adds to Ruby's Solar System model when he decides to play a ball game indoors.
88a	10a	"Fun in the Sun"	Sheila Dinsmore	April 5, 2017	November 15, 2016	088a	0.77
Ruby, Louise, Max, and Lily discover a new sport, kite-boarding.
88b	10b	"Max the Detective"	Patrick Granleese	April 5, 2017	November 15, 2016	088b	0.77
Detective Max is on the case when Ruby misplaces her diary.
89a	11a	"Cowboy Max"	Amanda Smith	April 6, 2017	November 29, 2016	089a	0.75
Ruby and Louise are not pleased when Cowboy Max keeps wandering off with their skipping rope.
89b	11b	"Ruby's Poem"	Jennifer Daley	April 6, 2017	November 29, 2016	089b	0.75
Ruby discovers that a good joke is just the thing to help her get over her nervousness to recite a poem at school.
90a	12a	"Max and Winston"	Patrick Granleese	April 7, 2017	December 1, 2016	090a	0.77
Max and Winston create a racing car of their own.
90b	12b	"Grandma's Bunny Sniffles"	Amanda Smith	April 7, 2017	December 1, 2016	090b	0.77
Max and Ruby go to Grandma's house when Grandma gets the case of the Bunny Sniffles.
91a	13a	"You Can't Catch Me"	Bernice Vanderlaan	TBA	October 7, 2017	091a	TBD
Ruby tries to create a new game for the Bunny Scouts while Max wants to be caught.
91b	13b	"Max's Bubbles"	James Backshall	TBA	October 7, 2017	091b	TBD
Max and Lily make the biggest bubbles while distracting Ruby and Louise.
92a	14a	"Ruby's Chocolate Chip Chaos"	Jennifer Daley	TBA	October 14, 2017	092a	0.61
Ruby and Louise sell chocolate chip cookies and ice cream.
92b	14b	"Max's Kazoo"	Amanda Smith	TBA	October 14, 2017	092b	0.61
Max learns how to play a kazoo.
93a	15a	"Ruby's Party"	Anthony Artibello & Sheila Dinsmore	July 9, 2017	October 16, 2017	095a	0.48
Ruby, Louise and Valerie set up for a Halloween party while Max and Morris pretend to be Robin Hood and Little John.
93b	15b	"Max's Super Jet"	Anthony Artibello & Sheila Dinsmore	July 9, 2017	October 16, 2017	095b	0.48
Max and Morris play with a paper aeroplane.
94a	16a	"Max Decorates"	Anne-Marie Perrotta	April 12, 2017	October 21, 2017	094a	0.60
Max & Ruby decorate their house for a light festival.
94b	16b	"Max's Shiny Coin"	Patrick Granleese	April 12, 2017	October 21, 2017	094b	0.60
Ruby tries to sell Max some Bunny Scout Cookies.
95a	17a	"Super Shopper Max"	Andrew Sabiston	April 13, 2017	October 28, 2017	104a	0.59
Max looks for a see through toy while Ruby collects ingredients.
95b	17b	"Ruby's Time Capsule"	Sheila Dinsmore	April 13, 2017	October 28, 2017	104b	0.59
Max and Ruby make a time capsule.
96a	18a	"Ruby's Ice Show"	James Backshall	TBA	December 9, 2017	097a	0.55
Ruby, Louise, and Valerie perform a snowflake dance while Max, Morris, and Lily become penguins.
96b	18b	"Max's Baby Birdie"	Amanda Smith	TBA	December 9, 2017	097b	0.55
Max and Lily meet a baby bird in the backyard.
97	19	"Max and Ruby's Museum Adventure"	Bernice Vanderlaan	TBA	September 14, 2018	093	TBD
Max and Ruby participate on a field trip sleepover to the Museum with Louise, Morris, Lily, Priya, and Winston, with tours and a scavenger hunt, and Max teaches them about Tyrannosaurus rex.
98	20	"Max and Ruby's Pirate Adventure"	Patrick Granleese	July 3, 2017	September 24, 2018	098	0.53
Max and Ruby go to Bunny Island with Grandma, only to run into some pirates.
99a	21a	"Lost and Found"	Jennifer Daley	July 4, 2017	April 21, 2018	099a	0.46
Max and Ruby try to find the owner of a squeaky gorilla.
99b	21b	"Ruby's Book Report"	Anthony Artibello & Sheila Dinsmore	July 4, 2017	April 21, 2018	099b	0.46
Ruby and Louise search for butterflies in the backyard.
100a	22a	"Ms. Bunty's Gift"	Ethan Micallef & Sheila Dinsmore	July 5, 2017	April 28, 2018	100a	0.35
Max is collecting pretty stones and leaves while Ruby searches for Ms. Bunty's gift.
100b	22b	"Max to the Rescue"	Anthony Artibello & Sheila Dinsmore	July 5, 2017	April 28, 2018	100b	0.35
Max and Morris pretend to be firefighters while Ruby attempts to build a birdhouse.
101a	23a	"Message in a Bottle"	Anne-Marie Perrotta	July 6, 2017	September 10, 2018	101a	0.20
Max and Lily build a sandcastle while Ruby and her friend go on a scavenger hunt as Roger watches from his life guard's chair.
101b	23b	"Max on a Mission"	Anthony Artibello & Sheila Dinsmore	July 6, 2017	September 10, 2018	101b	0.20
Grandma shows Max a picture of his grandpa, a policeman, and Max wears the hat around town while helping people.
102a	24a	"Max the Champion"	Robert Pincombe & Shelley Hoffman	July 7, 2017	September 11, 2018	102a	N/A
Max tries to win a prize from a claw machine.
102b	24b	"Max and Ruby's Restaurant"	Sheila Dinsmore	July 7, 2017	September 11, 2018	102b	N/A
Max, Ruby, and Grandma set up a restaurant in their home for their parent's anniversary.
103a	25a	"Ruby's Yard Sale"	Jennifer Daley	July 8, 2017	September 12, 2018	103a	N/A
Ruby puts together a yard sale, but Max wants to play with his old toys and isn't willing to sell any of them.
103b	25b	"Camper Max"	Anthony Artibello and Sheila Dinsmore	July 8, 2017	September 12, 2018	103b	N/A
Ruby, Valerie and Louise play in a badminton tournament in the yard, while Max and Morris pretend to go camping.
104a	26a	"Community Garden"	James Backshall	July 9, 2017	April 14, 2018	096a	0.46
Max helps Ruby and Grandma with their community garden.
104b	26b	"Ruby's Backyard Camping Trip"	Jennifer Daley	July 9, 2017	April 14, 2018	096b	0.46
Ruby's backyard camping trip turns into a scare-fest when Max tries to join the fun (ranging from a vampire, a wolf, a dragon and using a flashlight to Max's face, like a ghost). In the end, Max is feeling scared and sees a shadow, causing Ruby, Louise & Valerie and him to be very scared. Fortunately, this shadow turns out to be... a frog! It actually ate a little firefly. Now, that's a sigh of relief. So Max learned his lesson about the backyard camping trip for girls only: No Vampires, No Wolves, No Dragons, No Ghosts, No Frogs, and No Boys (except Max, of course). That's why the girls told Max that he could stay in their backyard camping trip.

=== Season 7 (2018–20) ===
In this season, Antonio, Grace and Oliver were introduced as the newest characters. Atomic Cartoons produced this season, as in the previous one the studio was the animation producer.

No. overall	No. in season	Title	Directed by	Written by	Canadian air date	U.S. air date	Prod. code	US viewers (millions)
105a	1a	"Max's Sleepover"	Mauro Casalese	Patrick Granleese	August 12, 2018	September 13, 2018	105a	N/A
Max host a sleepover with Morris and Winston while Ruby and Louise have a popcorn makeover sleepover party.
105b	1b	"Slugger Max"	Mauro Casalese	Sheila Rogerson	August 12, 2018	September 13, 2018	105b	N/A
Max and Lily play T-Ball, or Baseball, with the wind-up Lobster playing with them.
106a	2a	"Max's Fort"	Mauro Casalese	Amanda Smith	August 19, 2018	September 25, 2018	106a	0.54
Max and Winston move Ruby's picnic into their new fort.
106b	2b	"Ruby's Party Dress"	Mauro Casalese	Shelley Hoffman & Robert Pincombe	August 19, 2018	September 25, 2018	106b	0.54
Ruby tries to add special touches to her new dress.
107a	3a	"The Frog and the Fly"	Mauro Casalese	Karen Moonah	August 26, 2018	September 26, 2018	107a	0.56
Ruby and Louise put on a play while Max and Morris put on a band.
107b	3b	"Bye Bye Max's Lobster"	Mauro Casalese	Patrick Granleese	August 26, 2018	September 26, 2018	107b	0.56
The wind-up Lobster loses its key, and Max tries to find it.
108a	4a	"Ruby's Rocking Bunnies"	Mauro Casalese	Shelley Hoffman & Robert Pincombe	September 2, 2018	September 27, 2018	108a	0.48
Ruby, Louise, and Valerie put on a ukulele band while Max, Morris, and Priya play follow the leader.
108b	4b	"Max's Jump Shot"	Mauro Casalese	Patrick Granleese	September 2, 2018	September 27, 2018	108b	0.48
Max tries to make a basket in Basketball.
109a	5a	"Max's Parachute"	Mauro Casalese	Karen Moonah	September 9, 2018	October 1, 2018	109a	0.51
Max and Morris play parachute while Ruby and Priya build a sand castle.
109b	5b	"The Class Pet"	Mauro Casalese	Karen Moonah	September 9, 2018	October 1, 2018	109b	0.51
Max and Priya search for the class pet lizard (Corky the Chameleon) while Ruby, Louise, and Valerie concept on their projects.
110a	6a	"Ruby's Knot"	Mauro Casalese	Patrick Granleese	September 16, 2018	October 2, 2018	110a	0.50
Ruby learns from Grandma how to tie knots while Max and Morris go fishing.
110b	6b	"Soccer Star Max"	Mauro Casalese	Shelley Hoffman & Robert Pincombe	September 16, 2018	October 2, 2018	110b	0.50
Ruby fills in for Roger as coach to teach Max, Morris, Lily, Priya, and Winston how to play Soccer.
111a	7a	"Ruby's Book Reading"	Mauro Casalese	Karen Moonah	September 23, 2018	October 3, 2018	111a	0.43
Ruby attends Katie's new story at the store, with Max in tow.
111b	7b	"Max and a Space Alien"	Mauro Casalese	Sheila Rogerson	September 23, 2018	October 3, 2018	111b	0.43
Ruby and Louise work on their projects while Max and Morris go after a butterfly, thinking that it seems to be an alien.
112	8	"Max and Ruby's Bunnyhop Parade"	Mauro Casalese	Sheila Rogerson	September 30, 2018	October 4, 2018	112	0.53
Everyone in East Bunnyhop is excited for the celebration of Sir Bunnyhop. While Max looks for Sir Bunnyhop's treasure, Ruby makes a new friend named Antonio.
113a	9a	"The Bunny Gnome"	Mauro Casalese	Amanda Smith	October 7, 2018	April 21, 2019	113a	0.38
Max and Morris hunt for the legendary Bunny Gnome while Ruby worries about not seeing the meteor shower.
113b	9b	"Max's Movie Magic"	Mauro Casalese	Shelley Hoffman and Robert Pincombe	October 7, 2018	April 21, 2019	113b	0.38
Ruby helps put the school's movie in, but when the wrong movie shows up, Max, Morris, and Lily uses their dinosaur toys to save the day.
114a	10a	"Robo-Max"	Mauro Casalese	Karen Moonah	October 14, 2018	April 21, 2019	114a	0.36
Max, Ruby, and Grandma have an ice cream party, play old games, and involve space robot toys to the fun, from the olden days.
114b	10b	"Let it Snow"	Mauro Casalese	Karen Moonah	October 14, 2018	April 21, 2019	114b	0.36
Max plays with packing supplies while Ruby and Louise set up a display in Rosalinda's shop.
115a	11a	"Max's Hug"	Mauro Casalese	Patrick Granleese	April 7, 2019	April 21, 2019	115a	0.30
Max refuses to give Ruby a hug, while Ruby prepares for school picture day.
115b	11b	"Super Spy Max"	Mauro Casalese	Jennifer Daley	April 7, 2019	April 21, 2019	115b	0.30
Max and Lily pretend to be spies, while Ruby and Louise make necklaces.
116a	12a	"Max's Big Race"	Mauro Casalese	Kendra Hibbert	April 21, 2019	April 21, 2019	116a	0.28
Max and Morris try to distract Ruby while she bakes cookies.
116b	12b	"Max's S'mores"	Mauro Casalese	Jennifer Daley	April 21, 2019	April 21, 2019	116b	0.28
Max and Morris can't stop thinking about making s'mores during a camping trip.
117a	13a	"One of a Kind Ruby"	Mauro Casalese	Sheila Rogerson	April 28, 2019	December 7, 2019	117a	0.32
Ruby and Louise want to make a one of a kind snow sculpture for the East Bunnyhop Snow Sculpture Contest while Max and Morris try to roll up the biggest snowball they can.
117b	13b	"Ruby's To Do List"	Mauro Casalese	Patrick Granleese	April 28, 2019	December 7, 2019	117b	0.32
When Ruby makes a To Do List, she and Max set out to do the things on the list, but Max wants to have fun and it could jeopardize Ruby's shopping trip.
118a	14a	"Ruby's Apples"	Mauro Casalese	Karen Moonah	May 5, 2019	October 5, 2019	118a	0.53
Ruby picks apples while Max is determined to make a big leaf pile.
118b	14b	"Ruby's Storytime"	Mauro Casalese	Patrick Granleese	May 5, 2019	October 5, 2019	118b	0.53
Ruby tries to decide on a talent for the talent show while Max wants her to read him a story.
119a	15a	"Ruby's Puzzling Puzzle"	Mauro Casalese	Jennifer Daley	April 14, 2019	March 30, 2020	119a	0.43
Max is planning for the next scavenger hunt while Ruby is working on a puzzle.
119b	15b	"Ruby's Egg Hunt"	Mauro Casalese	Patrick Granleese	April 14, 2019	March 30, 2020	119b	0.43
Ruby asks Max to help her find eggs in a Bunny Scout Egg Hunt.
120a	16a	"Happy Baby Huffington"	Mauro Casalese	Karen Moonah	May 12, 2019	December 28, 2019	120a	0.29
Ruby helps Mom babysit Baby Huffington while Max forms a one-bunny band.
120b	16b	"Ruby's Cupcakes"	Mauro Casalese	Jennifer Daley	May 12, 2019	December 28, 2019	120b	0.29
Ruby decorates cupcakes while Max has Lily over to play in puddles.
121a	17a	"Mover Max"	Mauro Casalese	Kate Barris	May 19, 2019	March 31, 2020	121a	0.42
Ruby and Louise work on a project while Max and Morris tidy up.
121b	17b	"Ruby's Circus"	Mauro Casalese	Bob Ardiel	May 19, 2019	March 31, 2020	121b	0.42
Ruby and her friends put on a circus while Max tries to teeter-totter.
122a	18a	"Ruby's Rock"	Mauro Casalese	Karen Moonah	May 26, 2019	April 1, 2020	122a	0.38
Ruby and her friends take Max to the Museum.
122b	18b	"Max's Backyard Safari"	Mauro Casalese	Jennifer Daley	May 26, 2019	April 1, 2020	122b	0.38
Max puts on a backyard safari for his friends while Ruby draws for a Bunny Scout badge.
123a	19a	"Max and Ruby's Father's Day"	Mauro Casalese	Patrick Granleese	June 2, 2019	June 16, 2019	123a	0.28
Max and Ruby want to do something special for Dad for Father's Day.
123b	19b	"Ruby's Hockey Practice"	Mauro Casalese	Kendra Hibbert	June 2, 2019	June 16, 2019	123b	0.28
Ruby and Louise want to practice their hockey skills while Max and Winston play ice pirates.
124a	20a	"Ruby's Yoga Twist"	Mauro Casalese	James Backshall	June 23, 2019	April 2, 2020	124a	0.38
Ruby and Louise practice yoga while Max plays ‘tunnel tag’ with his friends.
124b	20b	"Ruby's Cafe"	Mauro Casalese	Kate Barris	June 23, 2019	April 2, 2020	124b	0.38
Ruby creates her own café while Max plays with his toy bug collection.
125a	21a	"Ruby's Tidy Town"	Mauro Casalese	Bob Ardiel	July 20, 2019	April 3, 2020	125a	0.42
Ruby and Valerie seek to tidy up the park while Robot Max and Robot Morris aim to help.
125b	21b	"Max the Dragon Tamer"	Mauro Casalese	Sheila Rogerson	July 20, 2019	April 3, 2020	125b	0.42
Ruby, Louise and Valerie host a bake sale at the beach, only to have their efforts thwarted by hungry seagulls.
126a	22a	"Ruby's Tea Party Surprise"	Mauro Casalese	Kate Barris	July 27, 2019	October 19, 2019	126a	0.41
Ruby throws a tea party for Max and Lily’s playdate, only Max would rather make mudpies.
126b	22b	"Max's Bump in the Night"	Mauro Casalese	Karen Moonah	July 27, 2019	October 19, 2019	126b	0.41
Ruby and Max sleep over at Grandma’s house, only Max keeps hearing noises in the night.
127	23	"Max and Ruby and the New Baby"	Mauro Casalese	Patrick Granleese	August 3, 2019	April 6, 2020	127	0.38
Mom and Dad are expecting a baby, and Ruby is determined to choose a name. She enlists Max’s help, only he isn’t sure he wants a new brother or sister - until he realizes he’ll have a new little buddy!
128a	24a	"Max's Crew"	Mauro Casalese	Sheila Rogerson	August 10, 2019	April 7, 2020	128a	0.37
Ruby decorates the house to surprise Mom while Max and the twins play together.
128b	24b	"Super Helpful Max"	Mauro Casalese	Karen Moonah	August 10, 2019	April 7, 2020	128b	0.37
Ruby and Grandma's efforts to take the perfect picture of the twins for a contest goes awry.
129a	25a	"The Twins' Puppet Show"	Mauro Casalese	Bob Ardiel	August 17, 2019	April 8, 2020	129a	0.33
Ruby and Valerie try to entertain the twins with a puppet show, only the babies are much more interested in Max’s train toys.
129b	25b	"Max & Ruby's Switch"	Mauro Casalese	Kate Barris	August 17, 2019	April 8, 2020	129b	0.33
While Dad is busy in the shed, Ruby agrees to play with Grace while Max plays with Oliver. But when things go wrong, they decide to switch.
130a	26a	"Sea Monster Max"	Mauro Casalese	Sheila Rogerson	August 24, 2019	April 9, 2020	130a	0.46
Ruby seeks to create the perfect ‘first swim’ for the twins, but she’s convinced Sea Monster Max is scaring them away from the pool.
130b	26b	"Max's Bunny Scout Badge"	Mauro Casalese	Sheila Rogerson	August 24, 2019	April 9, 2020	130b	0.46
Ruby and Louise try to teach the twins to talk in order to earn a Bunny Scout Badge.
