= Through the Hidden Door =

- Author: Rosemary Wells
- Language: English
- Publication date: 1987

Through the Hidden Door is a 1987 young adult novel by Rosemary Wells. The book was a runner-up for a 1988 Edgar Allan Poe Award.

The book details the story of Barney Penniman, an awkward eighth-grader with a lisp who is attending a boarding school. Barney deals with bullies and a headmaster who dislikes him, but finds friendship with a younger, also socially awkward student named Snowy Cobb. The two boys unearth an amazing archeological find and secretly work to dig it up.

Through the Hidden Door was published by Puffin in 1987.
