= The Random House Book of Mother Goose =

Book by Arnold Lobel

The Random House Book of Mother Goose: a Treasury of More Than 300 Classic Nursery Rhymes
- First edition
- Author: Arnold Lobel (editor)
- Illustrator: Arnold Lobel
- Language: English
- Genre: Children's picture book
- Published: 1986 (Random House)
- Publication place: USA
- Media type: Print (hardback)
- Pages: 176
- ISBN: 9780679987369
- OCLC: 13423488

The Random House Book of Mother Goose: a Treasury of More Than 300 Classic Nursery Rhymes is a 1986 collection of over 300 nursery rhymes by Arnold Lobel. It was republished in 1997 as The Arnold Lobel Book of Mother Goose.

== Reception ==
Alison Lurie, writing for The New York Times called it "an almost continuous round of noise and fun and feasting." writing "One admirable feature of this new edition of Mother Goose is its generous inclusiveness." and although "Readers of a generation raised on earlier visualizations of Mother Goose may regret some aspects of Mr. Lobel's version.", concluded "on balance this is a wonderful new edition of these classic rhymes,".

Horn Book wrote "All in all, this is an ample and robust volume, vibrant with the many human conditions that gave rise to the rhymes in the first place: quirks, incongruities, injustices, nightmares, absurdities, laughter, hopes, dreams."

Parents' Choice awarded it a gold medal and wrote "The day Mother Goose met Mr. Lobel was a fortunate day."

== See also ==
- Histoires ou contes du temps passé
- Mother Goose in Prose
- My Very First Mother Goose
- Mother Goose's Little Treasures
