= Mother Goose's Little Treasures =

2007 picture book by Iona Opie

- Author: Iona Opie (editor)
- Illustrator: Rosemary Wells
- Language: English
- Genre: Children's picture book
- Published: 2007 (Candlewick Press)
- Publication place: England
- Media type: Print (hardback)
- Pages: 52
- ISBN: 9780763636555
- OCLC: 144226858

Mother Goose's Little Treasures is a 2007 children's picture book by Iona Opie. It is a collection of nursery rhymes, some little known, chosen by Opie from the Mother Goose oeuvre.

== Contents ==
Little Treasures contains 22 nursery rhymes:

Here comes Solomon
The leaves are green
Intery, mintery
Handy Spandy
Rosy apple
Mrs. Whirly
Parcel post
Sing, sing
In and out the windows
Little fatty doctor
Oats and beans and barley
Wee melodie man
Chick chick chick chick
What the goose thinketh
Mother, may I?
Little old dog sits under a chair
Uncle John
Cockle shells
Going to Kentucky
The moon shines bright
My maid Mary
Before it gets dark.

== Reception ==
In a star review, Booklist wrote "This gem, comprising 22 tidbits from little-known nursery rhymes, shines with the charm of old-time rhymes and with Wells' beloved animal and child characters, set down in her signature style." and concludes "this third Opie-Wells treasury of treasures is likely to become a staple in children's collections." and the School Library Journal found "The very nature of this book makes it a less-essential purchase than this team's My Very First Mother Goose (1996) or Here Comes Mother Goose (1999, both Candlewick), so possibly only larger collections or libraries with lots of Rosemary Wells fans will want it."

Kirkus Reviews wrote "The pictures may suggest scenarios for some of the more abstract lines here, but young goslings will still benefit most not by trying to make sense of the gnomic verses, but just listening to the rhythms of sound and language in them." Publishers Weekly stated "this is less a title for Everytoddler than one for lovers of rhyme and verse." while The New York Times, commenting on Opie's introduction, found her "more the Jungian than the scientist." and that "Wells’s pictures for Opie’s collection don’t go far enough in the originality direction."

== See also ==
- Histoires ou contes du temps passé
- Mother Goose in Prose
- My Very First Mother Goose
- The Random House Book of Mother Goose
