= Noisy Nora =

Children's picture book about a mouse named Nora

- Cover of 1997 reissue with all new illustrations
- Author: Rosemary Wells
- Illustrator: Rosemary Wells
- Cover artist: Rosemary Wells
- Language: English
- Genre: Children's book
- Publisher: Dial Press
- Publication date: 1973
- Publication place: USA
- Media type: Print (hardback and paperback)
- Pages: 37 (unpaginated)
- ISBN: 9780590758024
- OCLC: 363613

Noisy Nora is a 1973 children's picture book by Rosemary Wells. It is about a mouse called Nora who likes to make lots of noise just to get attention.

== Plot ==
One evening, an attention-starved middle mouse named Nora wanted attention for her parents. But her parents are doing stuff with her older sister Kate and her baby brother Jack. After so much waiting, Nora decides to make noise: She banged the window, slammed the door, and dropped Kate's marbles on the kitchen floor. But, unfortunately, all it did was make her parents yell at her to be quiet and Kate embarrassedly says to Nora: "Nora, why are you so dumb?"

Nora tried to get attention again but her parents are still doing things with Jack & Kate. Again, she tried to make noise to get attention: She knocked the lamp, felled some chairs, and flew a kite down the stairs and crashed it at the bottom of the stairs. But, again, her parents yell at her to be quiet and Kate embarrassedly says to Nora again: "Nora, why are you so dumb?"

Out of options to get attention again, Nora shouted to her whole family after she couldn't get attention from them: "I'm leaving and I'm never coming back!" After a moment of silence without Nora, The family realizes that Nora is gone because they neglected her and they decided to form a search party to find Nora. But Nora was not in the mailbox or in the cellar or hiding in the shrub or in the tub.

Nora's mother was very upset that Nora is gone forever even when they were searching through the trash. But, all of a sudden, Nora popped out of the broom closet saying "But I'm back again" and everything in the closet came down with a monumental crash. The whole family was glad that she was back and they managed to accept her by giving her attention again.

== Development and inspiration ==
Wells has said that she was an only child, as opposed to Nora who was the middle child of a big family. Wells has called her books ""non-fiction"", so that "Nora was my grade school best friend, Virginia O’Malley, who was a middle child".

== Publication history ==
- 1973, USA, Dial Books ISBN 9780590758024
- 1997, USA, Dial Books ISBN 9780803718357

== Reception ==
A review in Kirkus Reviews of Noisy Nora wrote "Any child who has felt left out of the family schedule and affections can identify with Nora, ..".

Noisy Nora has also been reviewed by School Library Journal, Booklist, and Horn Book Guides

It is a School Library Journal Best of the Best book, an American Library Association Notable Children's Book, and a Choosing Books for Kids book. A recording of the book is an ALA Notable Recording.

== Adaptions ==
In 1994, Weston Woods developed an animated story based on the book's illustrations, which was narrated by Mary Beth Hurt.

In 2000, Nora was featured as one of the characters in the Timothy Goes to School animated TV series.

In 2010, it was produced by Newvideo and Scholastic and bundled with 4 other animated stories on a "Scholastic Storybook Treasures" DVD.
