= Hazel's Amazing Mother =

1985 book by Rosemary Wells

- Original book cover
- Author: Rosemary Wells
- Language: English
- Genre: Children's story
- Publisher: Dial Books for Young Readers
- Publication date: September 16, 1985
- Publication place: United States
- Media type: Print (hardback and paperback)
- Pages: 32

Hazel's Amazing Mother is an American children's picture book written by Rosemary Wells, published in 1985 by Dial Books for Young Readers/Penguin Random Hose. It was one of the New York Times Best Illustrated Children's Books of the Year in 1985.

== Plot ==
Hazel, a little badger, is out for a walk with her beloved doll Eleanor. But when she makes a wrong turn, she encounters some kids who are up to no good. Fortunately, Hazel's amazing mother is there to rescue her, and set the bullies straight just in the nick of time.
