= Timothy Goes to School =

Children's television series, 2001–2003

- Genre: Animated series Children's television series Preschool
- Based on: Timothy Goes to School by Rosemary Wells
- Developed by: Kate Barris
- Directed by: Gary Hurst
- Voices of: Austin Di Iulio; Lisa Yamanaka; Tracy Ryan; Max Morrow; Alyson Court; Mag Ruffman; Darren Frost; Rob Stefaniuk; Laurie Elliott; Joanne Vannicola; Linda Kash; Fiona Reid; Jamie Watson
- Theme music composer: Stan Meissner
- Opening theme: "It's a Brand New Day"
- Ending theme: "It's a Brand New Day" (instrumental)
- Composer: Stan Meissner
- Countries of origin: Canada; Hong Kong
- Original language: English
- No. of seasons: 2
- No. of episodes: 26 (52 segments)

Production
- Executive producers: Michael Hirsh; Patrick Loubert; Clive A. Smith; Steven Ching; Rosemary Wells (uncredited); Diana Manson; Tina Peel
- Running time: 26 minutes (2 13-minute segments)
- Production companies: Nelvana Limited; Animation Services (Hong Kong) Limited; Silver Lining Entertainment Limited

Original release
- Network: PBS Kids (United States); TVOntario (Canada); Knowledge Network (Canada); Access (Canada); Saskatchewan Communications Network (Canada)
- Release: September 30, 2000 – January 26, 2002

Timothy Goes to School is a preschool children's animated television series developed by Kate Barris and based on books by Rosemary Wells (including the book of the same name). The series was produced by Nelvana Limited and Animation Services (Hong Kong) Limited in association with Silver Lining Entertainment Limited for TVOntario (in Canada) and PBS (in the US), and with the participation of Knowledge Network, Access and Saskatchewan Communications Network (SCN).

Timothy Goes to School was broadcast from September 30, 2000 to January 26, 2002 and aired in the US on PBS as part of the PBS Kids Bookworm Bunch block. Twenty-six episodes (52 segments) were produced over two seasons.

== Premise ==
Timothy Goes to School primarily focuses on a young enthusiastic anthropomorphic raccoon named Timothy, who attends kindergarten at a fictional place called "Hilltop School" along with ten other students (each of which are of different animals except for the Frank Twins and Claude). The kindergarten class is taught by Mrs. Jenkins, a comforting teacher who enjoys educating and helping her students.

== Characters ==
Below are the characters split up into three groups, children, adults, and others.

A majority of the characters were taken from other Rosemary Wells stories such as Shy Charles, Fritz and the Mess Fairy, Noisy Nora, and the Yoko and Friends: School Days book series.

=== Children ===
- Timothy (voiced by Austin Di Iulio) is a raccoon. Although he is the main character of the show, not all episodes are centered on him. He is a well-meaning young boy, generally trying to be a good friend to everyone. Occasionally, he can be impulsive for a little while. He wears a blue and white striped shirt, although he wore blue overalls on his first day at school and a red jacket on his second day. For bedtime, he wears just a red shirt with white collar, white tipped sleeves and red buttons. For summer, he wears blue swim trunks with a yellow waistband, red goggles with a yellow strap, a yellow snorkel with a red mouthpiece, and a pair of black flippers. In "Timothy's Way", he is naked while taking a bubble bath at nighttime.
- Yoko (voiced by Lisa Yamanaka) is a friendly gray tabby cat originally from Japan who is typically very sweet and is the most warm-hearted child in the school. She plays the violin well and sees the best in people. Yoko enjoys different aspects of Japanese culture, including sushi and origami, which has occasionally caused problems for her and her classmates. She is Timothy's best friend and they are often seen together. She wears a yellow dress with a red cardigan. She's nicknamed "Little Cherry Blossom" by her mother.
- Doris (voiced by Tracy Ryan) is a beaver who is a boisterous tomboy. She is a very talented soccer player who seems to have a fear of insects and spiders. Doris has three older brothers: Morris, Horace, and Boris. Doris is clearly the tallest student in her class, though at home, she is teased by her brothers a lot as she is much smaller than they are. Doris appears to be the most avant-garde artist in class, as she believes her abstract art should never looked like anything else, as long as it makes her happy. Most of the other characters are impressed by her size and strength. She can sometimes be mean, intentionally or not. She wears a pink dress with a darker pink bow in her hair.
- Charles (voiced by Max Morrow) is a gray mouse who usually likes to play by himself at recess, but is often seen around Timothy, Yoko or Lilly, being the quieter members of the class. He engages in very creative and imaginative play, such as building a make-believe rocket. He has expressed his shyness strongly in "Shy Charles", both at school and at home. As he is the smallest member of the class, paired with Nora, he tends to not be very good at sports, but he is not annoyed by this. He wears a red shirt and blue overalls.
- Nora (voiced by Alyson Court) is a Bole-brown mouse who is sometimes very bossy and sulky. She is known for making a lot of noise which has earned her the nickname Noisy Nora. She owns a lizard called Norman who lives in the school. She has an 8-year-old sister, who is in 3rd grade, named Kate who has not appeared in the show other than as a picture Nora drew of her in "My Family", and a fully messy baby brother named Jack who occasionally appears. She wears a purple dress.
- Lilly (voiced by Mag Ruffman) is a fox who is usually forgetful and sometimes scatterbrained, and she often ties a string around a finger in order to remedy this. Lilly has a pet goldfish named Treasure. She is generally extremely absent-minded, but she remembers the most vital things. Her great forgetfulness can often be a source of annoyance to the other characters, but they quickly forgive her. She wears a sea green skirt with an orange shirt and a pair of red tennis shoes.
- Frank #1 (voiced by Darren Frost) & Frank #2 (voiced by Rob Stefaniuk) are French Bulldog twin brothers who love sports and often speak in unison. The brothers speak in stilted, dull voices which suggest they are not particularly intelligent. They are known for fighting with each other sometimes, telling jokes, and trying to do their things simultaneously with their trademark happy laughter. They are unable to stand being separated (as shown in the ‘Frankless Frank’ episode) and can sometimes be slightly reckless. Their favorite food is franks and beans. Frank #1 is black and wears a blue jersey, whereas Frank #2 is orange and wears a green jersey.
- Fritz (voiced by Laurie Elliott) is a skunk who is very fond of science and is another one of Timothy's best friends. He leaves for another school in "Fritz on the Move" and returns soon after in "Many Happy Returns" after his mother got a new job. Fritz is also the most clever in the class, and occasionally knows much more than the teacher about a particular subject. Fritz reacts quite badly to the failure in his experiments and also has a tendency towards messiness. He originally wore a yellow shirt with a green necktie, but, upon returning in "Many Happy Returns", his tie is replaced by a green multi-pocketed vest. For summer, he wears a pair of green and red swim trunks.
- Claude (voiced by Joanne Vannicola) is a raccoon who tries to be the best in the school, but comes off very arrogantly in some cases. Because of this, there is some rivalry between him and Timothy. However, they appear to become good friends after Timothy secretly teaches Claude to swim, after which Claude credits Timothy. He wears a dark green polo shirt and is most often seen with Grace. For summer, he wore a pair of dark green swim trunks.
- Grace (voiced by Linda Kash) is an upper-class ginger Exotic Shorthair who likes things her own way. Her interests include dancing, especially ballet, and figure skating. She has a quick temper and gets quickly annoyed when mistakes are made and silly questions are asked from the other people in the class. She is seen playing with Claude most of the time. She wears a bright blue dress.
- Juanita (voiced by Susan Laney Dalton) is a tuxedo cat originally from Mexico who only appears in the last two episodes (the last two episodes from Season 2; the second and final season); "Mama Don't Go" and "Making New Friends". Upon joining the school, she is very nervous, anxious, and feels insecure without her mother, but she finally overcomes her nerves. A new pupil to the school, she sees the best in people like Yoko. She has a doll named María and a gecko named Pablo.

=== Adults ===
- Mrs. Jenkins (voiced by Fiona Reid) is a fox and the kindergarten class's teacher. Her name was Miss Abercrombie before she married Mr. Jenkins as she was mentioned in the episode "Just in Time". She can play the piano well, sing songs and enjoys birdwatching as a hobby. She wears a green coat over a purple dress and a pair of glasses with red rims.
- Big Frank (voiced by Neil Crone) is a French bulldog and the single father of the Frank twins. He speaks in a gentle voice and is very kind, a great dad and encourages his sons. He is seen as good with the machinery and repairs, as he is easily able to fix Timothy's bicycle in "Red Thunder". He also helps the Franks fix Yoko's taketombo after they accidentally break it. He wears a blue work shirt. The case whether Big Frank is divorced or a widower is left unknown, as the whereabouts of his wife/the twins' mother is ambiguous.
- Henry (voiced by Jamie Watson) is a beaver. He is a very cheerful janitor and bus driver. He wears a blue uniform and was once the student of Mrs. Jenkins back when she was called Miss Abercrombie. Despite his appearance, he is not that old. In "Just in Time", he told the class he attended kindergarten 25 years prior.
- Miss Appleberry is a skunk and a student teacher at Hilltop School who is very cheerful and is sometimes seen with Mrs. Jenkins, mostly on school trips. She usually wears a blue dress. When Mrs. Jenkins sprained her arm in "Get Well Soon", she was the substitute teacher.
- Mrs. Lightfoot is a mouse and the librarian who gives the children their first library cards. She only appears in "Read Me a Story".

=== Others ===
There are several notable adults and relatives (mainly the children's parents and siblings), though many only appear in a couple of episodes. The fathers of Yoko, Fritz, and Lilly are never seen in the show, as well as the mothers of Claude and the Franks. These are never addressed in the show at any point.

== Episodes ==
=== Season 1 (2000) ===
No. overall	No. in season	Title	Original release date
1	1	"Timothy Goes to School/Yoko"	September 30, 2000
"Timothy Goes to School" – It's Timothy's first day of School, but one of Timothy's new classmates, Claude, questions him on his clothing choices. "Yoko" – Yoko feels like an outcast when she is teased about her Japanese lunches. Mrs. Jenkins decides to sort this out by holding an "International Food Day".
2	2	"On the Fritz/The Great Obstacle Course"	October 7, 2000
"On the Fritz" – Fritz makes a big mess and blames all of it on "the mess fairy". However, once the Franks find out about it, Fritz must own up. "The Great Obstacle Course" – The children at Hilltop School run a Sports Day, but Claude and Grace are the only ones who care about winning.
3	3	"Small Change/Shy Charles"	October 14, 2000
"Small Change" – Nora is reluctant to change her room or any change for that matter. "Shy Charles" – Charles' shy nature proves to be problematic at times, but when he ends up in a problem that he needs to solve on his own, it's Charles to the rescue!
4	4	"Don't Lose It Lilly/Frankless Frank"	October 21, 2000
"Don't Lose It Lilly" – The children respectfully show Lilly how she can remember everything. "Frankless Frank" – Frank #1 has a fever and has to stay at home, and Frank #2 feels lonely.
5	5	"Paint by Numbers/The Sleepover"	October 28, 2000
"Paint by Numbers" – Doris likes to paint abstract art, but the only person that she knows who appreciates it is Charles. "The Sleepover" – After hearing that the mischievous Frank twins are coming over for a sleepover, Timothy hides his favorite stuffed toy penguin as he thinks that the Franks will make fun of him.
6	6	"The Music Tree/Team Project"	November 4, 2000
"The Music Tree" – When Mrs. Jenkins plans to construct a Music Tree and plans a spring symphony with Yoko as the lead cast, Yoko gets stage fright. "Team Project" – It's Team Project day at Hilltop School, and Timothy partners himself with Claude, but Claude refuses to let him to do any of the work.
7	7	"Cherry Blossom/Talent Show"	November 11, 2000
"Cherry Blossom" – Yoko grows a Japanese Sakura plant, but soon starts to grow impatient. She learns that patience can make things grow faster than you think. "Talent Show" – When Mrs. Jenkins holds a Talent Show, Grace is excited to perform her dances. However, after revealing that she has sprained her ankle, she is distraught about not performing. However, she realizes that her replacement role as director ends up being the most important role of them all.
8	8	"Scary Monsters/Lifesaver Lilly"	November 18, 2000
"Scary Monsters" – Nora is scared of Dinosaurs, which proves to be problematic when the class go on a field trip to the museum to see the dinosaurs. "Lifesaver Lilly" – Hilltop School borrows the library's Goldfish while it is closed. Lilly wants to look after the fish, but her classmates are skeptical about her remembering to look after it. However, when a snowstorm closes the school and freezes the water supply, Lilly comes to the rescue.
9	9	"Red Thunder/Putting It All Together"	November 25, 2000
"Red Thunder" – Timothy uses his new Red Thunder in a School Safety Day, but after experiencing Doris' brothers doing BMX skills afterwards, he learns why safety is important. "Putting It All Together" – The children have to put together a jigsaw puzzle for a picnic in an hour, can they complete it in time?
10	10	"The Big Snowfall/Forever Friends"	December 2, 2000
"The Big Snowfall" – Doris unsuccessfully tries to show responsibility while looking after Lilly on her first snowfall. "Forever Friends" – Timothy's friendship with Yoko becomes strained as Yoko has to practice her ballet recital with Grace.
11	11	"Taking the Plunge/Timothy's Way"	December 9, 2000
"Taking the Plunge" – It's the summer, and Claude is finding excuses not to swim. When Timothy finds out he can not swim, he takes it upon himself to teach Claude how to. "Timothy's Way" – Timothy cannot think of anything to teach the children at school. Can his marble games help?
12	12	"The Treefort and the Sandcastle/Get Well Soon"	December 16, 2000
"The Treefort and the Sandcastle" – The children at school split themselves into a boys-only Treefort club and a girls-only sandcastle club. However, they soon get bored. "Get Well Soon" – When Mrs. Jenkins has an injury, Miss Appleberry fills in as their substitute teacher. While everyone makes a get well soon card, Fritz is making something different with bugs, leftovers and worms. What unusual thing is he making?
13	13	"In the Spotlight/Fritz on the Move"	December 23, 2000
"In the Spotlight" – It's Charles' turn In the Spotlight, but his shy nature proves problematic, and he needs Timothy's help. "Fritz on the Move" – When Timothy finds out that Fritz is moving away, he is very upset. Mrs. Jenkins shows him many ways to make him feel better and see Fritz again.

=== Season 2 (2001–02) ===
No. overall	No. in season	Title	Original release date
14	1	"Many Happy Returns/You're Invited"	November 3, 2001
"Many Happy Returns" – The students at Hiltop School remember the times they spent with Fritz, while Timothy finds out that Fritz has an even bigger surprise for him. "You're Invited" – Everybody gets an invitation to Lilly's spring party except Doris. Thinking she is left out, Doris tries to be friendly to Lilly, but her attempts prove to be problematic.
15	2	"The Greatest/Rocky Friendship"	November 10, 2001
"The Greatest" – Because he found Nora's pet iguana, Timothy is forced to help all the children. "Rocky Friendship" – When Charles and Fritz argue over a rare red rock, Timothy has to decide who should have it.
16	3	"Two for Tea/Abracadabra"	November 17, 2001
"Two for Tea" – Yoko's mother comes to the school in order to demonstrate the Japanese tea ceremony called "Sado". However, Nora's conflicts with her ideas of parties, not understanding the differences between how Yoko does things and how she does things. "Abracadabra" – When Grace peeks into Fritz's magic book and steals Fritz's magic talent, Fritz blames Timothy for supposedly telling her. Grace must admit to what she did before it's too late.
17	4	"The Taketombo/Having a Wonderful Time"	November 24, 2001
"The Taketombo" – Yoko receives a Japanese toy called a Taketombo. However, when the Franks accidentally break it, they must find a way to repair it. They learn how they can turn a mistake into something even better. "Having a Wonderful Time" – The students of the school visit Hilltop Park and Grace becomes ultra-prepared, but Lilly worries that she is not having fun.
18	5	"The Shutterbug/The Friendship Stone"	December 1, 2001
"The Shutterbug" – Timothy brings a camera to the school, but when he takes his pictures, he thinks that none of the photographs are precise enough to be put in an album. "The Friendship Stone" – Nora and Lilly exchange a lucky penny for a painted stone as they are real friends. But when Lilly loses the stone, she thinks Nora won't be her friend anymore.
19	6	"New Found Franks/When I Grow Up"	December 8, 2001
"New Found Franks" – The Franks always do things together, but when they decide to split up and see what it's like doing things separately, they learn that it's as fun to do things with their classmates as much as they do things together. "When I Grow Up" – When Henry gets recognition for five years of safe bus driving, Mrs. Jenkins asks the children to share what they want to be when they grow up.
20	7	"The School Play/Full of Beans"	December 15, 2001
"The School Play" – Yoko is chosen to be a tooth with a cavity in the school play about dental care, but she is not very satisfied with her part. Can she find a way to make her part fun? "Full of Beans" – The Franks go too far with their jokes which makes all of the children, including each other, angry and wound up.
21	8	"Read Me a Story/The Gift"	December 22, 2001
"Read Me a Story" – When Nora's Mum tells her that she can read all by herself now, Nora fears that her beloved storytime with her mother could come to an end. "The Gift" – Nora wants to get a special gift for Yoko's birthday party, so she eats her least favorite cereal because it has an emerald ballet slipper as a prize.
22	9	"Measuring Up/Lost and Found"	December 29, 2001
"Measuring Up" – Charles finds out that he is the smallest in the class, but he finds out that Doris, who is the biggest in the class, is the youngest in her family. "Lost and Found" – When Yoko's mother shows her a special set of netsuke figures made by Yoko's grandfather, she allows Yoko to take them in for In the Spotlight. However, they get stolen by somebody, and nobody knows who has taken them, leaving Yoko very sad. Note: For unknown reasons, both segments have not yet been broadcast in Spanish-speaking countries of Latin America.
23	10	"Professor Fritz/Two Tutu Friends"	January 5, 2002
"Professor Fritz" – Fritz develops a rocket experiment for an open house day, but after the experiment goes wrong, Fritz just gives up and loses his self-confidence. "Two Tutu Friends" – Grace invites Doris to her ballet class. However, a quarrel over an accident Grace has causes them to split up.
24	11	"My Family/Just in Time"	January 12, 2002
"My Family" – Nora is tired of having her baby brother Jack, but she soon learns what fun an infant sibling can be. "Just in Time" – Lilly puts her favorite doll Thumbelina in the time capsule box, but soon she begins to regret it.
25	12	"Charles the Athlete/Be My Valentine"	January 19, 2002
"Charles the Athlete" – When Charles finishes last in a race, The Franks want to teach Charles how to be an athlete, but he does not show any interest. "Be My Valentine" – Lilly, Yoko, Charles and Timothy make Valentine's Day cards for each other, but Lilly mixes them up and puts them in the wrong cubbies.
26	13	"Mama Don't Go/Making New Friends"	January 26, 2002
"Mama Don't Go" – Juanita is new to Hilltop School. Timothy and Yoko help her manage without her needing her mother with her. "Making New Friends" – Juanita struggles to make new friends, so Timothy, who becomes the Captain of the Ship of Friends of the class, shows her what fun she could discover.

== Telecast and home media ==
=== Television airing ===
Timothy Goes to School was first premiered on September 30, 2000, and aired its final episode on January 26, 2002. The show aired in the U.S. on PBS as a segment on the PBS Kids Bookworm Bunch block from 2000 until 2004. It also aired on TLC and Discovery Kids (now as DFC) from August 30, 2004 to December 31, 2006, and on now-defunct Qubo from May 13, 2013 to July 24, 2020.
