= My Very First Mother Goose =

1996 PICTURE BOOK

- Author: Iona Opie (editor)
- Illustrator: Rosemary Wells
- Language: English
- Genre: Children's picture book
- Published: 1996 (Candlewick Press, Massachusetts)
- Publication place: England
- Media type: Print (hardback)
- Pages: 107
- ISBN: 9781564026200
- OCLC: 34115486

My Very First Mother Goose is a 1996 children's picture book by Iona Opie. It is a collection of sixty-eight nursery rhymes, chosen by Opie from the Mother Goose oeuvre, and illustrated by Rosemary Wells.

== Reception ==
The School Library Journal wrote "Such a spirit of fun and pleasure emanates from every page of this big, handsome volume that although there are many distinguished entries in the nursery-rhyme book field, this one is sure to add special joy to any collection." Kirkus Reviews concluded "There's little point in pretending that even prodigious collections of nursery rhymes can do without this one--it's a must." and Publishers Weekly in a star review called it an "exuberant anthology" and wrote " A collaboration that both freshens and preserves the past, this volume deserves a prominent place not just in the nursery room but on the shelves of all who treasure illustrated books."

While discussing various Mother Goose books, Horn Book called My First Mother Goose a "lap-friendly charmer" and "a fine place to begin," Parents' Choice awarded it a 1996 Gold Award and stated "The rhythmical mixture makes a generous volume distinctive; it's simultaneously pungent, sweet and salty. Rosemary Wells' watercolors have uproarious good humor and unfailing tenderness."

It is a 1997 American Library Association Notable Children's Book, and also appears on an Association for Library Service to Children Book List.

== See also ==
- Histoires ou contes du temps passé
- Mother Goose in Prose
- Mother Goose's Little Treasures
- The Random House Book of Mother Goose
