= Emily's First 100 Days of School =

2000 children's picture book by Rosemary Wells

- Author: Rosemary Wells
- Illustrator: Wells
- Language: English
- Genre: Children's Book
- Published: May 1, 2000
- Publisher: Hyperion Books
- Publication place: United States
- Pages: 64
- ISBN: 0-7868-0507-2

Emily's First 100 Days of School is a children's book written and illustrated by Rosemary Wells. Published by Hyperion Books in 2000, it is about a young rabbit who learns the numbers one to one hundred in many different ways, starting with the number one for her first day of school.

== Reception ==
Kirkus Reviews wrote: "Wells (Yoko, 1998, etc.) makes numbers fun and relevant to daily life in this longer than usual picture book."

== Film adaptation ==
A thirty-six-minute animated film based on the book was released in 2006. Directed by Gene Deitch, it was produced by JZ Media and Weston Woods Studios, Inc.
