= Max & Ruby =

Canadian animated television series

- Genre: Children's television series
- Created by: Rosemary Wells
- Based on: Max & Ruby by Rosemary Wells
- Directed by: Jamie Whitney (season 1; some S2 episodes; seasons 3–5); Steven Boeckler (season 2); Derek Prout (season 6); Mauro Casalese (season 7)
- Voices of: Billy Rosemberg; Samantha Morton; Julie Lemieux; Kay Hawtrey; Rebecca Peters; Tyler Stevenson; Tyler James Nathan; Drew Davis; Nicholas Fry; Gavin MacIver-Wright; Lana Carillo
- Theme music composer: Geoff Bennett; Ben Johannesen; André Hirz; TTG Music Lab
- Composers: Geoff Bennett; Ben Johannesen; André Hirz; TTG Music Lab
- Country of origin: Canada
- Original language: English
- No. of seasons: 7
- No. of episodes: 130 (334 segments) (list of episodes)

Production
- Executive producers: Michael Hirsh; Scott Dyer; Tina Peel; Vince Commisso; Doug Murphy; Diana Manson; Colin Bohm; Megan DeLoach; Irene Weibel
- Producers: Kristin Robertson; Tracy Leach; Vanessa Esteves; Melissa Graham
- Running time: 22–23 minutes
- Production companies: Nelvana Limited; Silver Lining Entertainment Limited (seasons 1–5); 9 Story Entertainment (Note: As M&R Story Productions Ltd (season 3), M & R IV Productions, Ltd. (season 4), and M & R V Productions, Ltd (season 5)) (seasons 3–5); Chorion (Note: Silver Lining Entertainment was purchased by Chorion in July 2005) (seasons 4–5); Atomic Cartoons (Note: Atomic provided animation services for Series 6 before becoming a co-producer for Series 7. Produced as Atomic Cartoons (Max and Ruby 7) Inc. Productions) (season 7)

Original release
- Network: Treehouse TV
- Release: September 10, 2002 – April 9, 2020

Max & Ruby is a Canadian children's preschool animated television series based on the book series by Rosemary Wells and produced by Nelvana Limited. The series follows the everyday lives of two young anthropomorphic rabbit siblings Max and Ruby.

Two Max & Ruby books had been previously adapted into short films by Weston Woods and Michael Sporn Animation in 1988 and 1991. These shorts were later remade into episodes for the television series.

Max & Ruby first aired in Canada on Treehouse TV on September 10, 2002. In the United States, the series first aired on Nickelodeon on the Nick Jr. block on October 18, 2002. 130 half-hour episodes were produced, with the final episode airing on April 9, 2020.

The first two seasons of the series were added to Paramount+ on December 8, 2020, but on March 25, 2026, the show was removed from the service.

== Premise ==
Max & Ruby follows the everyday lives of two young anthropomorphic rabbit siblings: Max, a rambunctious and achievement-determined three-year-old and his older sister Ruby, a seldom-patient, goal-oriented, and sometimes bossy seven-year-old. The majority of the series takes place in a town known as East Bunnyhop. According to Wells, the series shows the relationship between Ruby, Max and the universal nature of sibling relationships.

== Episodes ==
Season	Segments	Episodes	Originally released	
Season	Segments	Episodes	First released	Last released
Weston Woods shorts	2	2	October 7, 1988	January 15, 1992
1	39	13	September 10, 2002	February 14, 2003
2	39	13	July 8, 2003	April 27, 2004
3	42	14	October 27, 2006	May 2, 2007
4	36	12	June 15, 2009	November 3, 2009
5	78	26	December 10, 2011	February 11, 2013
6	50	26	September 18, 2016	September 24, 2018
7	50	26	August 12, 2018	April 9, 2020

The series premiered in 2002, but was preceded by a 1988 short and a 1991 short adapting the characters for the first time. The shorts were individually produced and were later remade into broadcast series episodes.

== Characters ==
=== Main ===
- Max Bunny (voiced by Billy Rosemberg in seasons 1–3, Tyler Stevenson in seasons 4–5, (Note: Drew Davis voiced Max in the season 5 intro dialogues.) and Gavin MacIver-Wright in seasons 6–7) is a three, later four-year-old (starting off at three and a half years old), bunny and Ruby's younger brother. He has white fur and wears some clothes including some long overalls. Prior to seasons 3 & 5 and for the first few episodes of seasons 1 and 2, Max usually only says 1–3 unique words per episode (with the exception of a few episodes like Max's Bedtime, Ruby's Candy Store, and of voiceover on the title card for episodes featuring Ruby). He does this again in season 5 (voiceover on the episode's title card; except in just the ones featuring Ruby). In seasons 6–7, Max (along with Morris) is now able to speak in full sentences.
- Ruby Bunny (voiced by Samantha Morton in seasons 1-2, Rebecca Peters in seasons 3–5, and Lana Carillo in seasons 6–7) is a seven, later, eight-year-old (starting off at seven years old and of voiceover on the title card for episodes featuring Max) white bunny, and is Max's older sister. She has white fur and has been considered the more level-headed of the siblings. She is also a member of the Bunny Scouts (a group similar to the various Girl Scouts movements).

=== Recurring ===
- Louise (voiced by Julie Lemieux) is Ruby’s best friend. She often comes over to visit and helps Ruby. She has tan/auburn fur and a little cousin named Morris.
  - Lemieux also voiced Baby Huffington, also known as Baby H (Mr. and Mrs. Huffington's baby son and Bunny Scout Leader's nephew), Grace (one of Max and Ruby's new baby siblings introduced in season 7 and Oliver's older twin sister who, similar to Max, likes getting dirty), and Oliver (the other one of Max and Ruby's new baby siblings introduced in season 7 and Grace's younger twin brother who, similar to Ruby, likes staying clean).
- Lilma Bunny (also known as Mrs. Bunny; voiced by Carolyn Larson) is Max and Ruby's mother introduced in season 6. She and Ruby are very close to each other and she trusts Ruby's ability to help out with Max. She is Grandma and Grandpa’s daughter-in-law.
- Fred Bunny (also known as Mr. Bunny; voiced by Paul Bates) is Max and Ruby's father introduced in Season 6. He is Grandma and Grandpa’s son.
- Grandma Bunny (voiced by Kay Hawtrey) has grey fur and is the paternal grandmother to Max and Ruby. Max and Ruby sometimes compete as to whose ideas are better in order to impress her, but in the end she likes both of their ideas equally. She is Fred's mother and Lilma's mother-in-law.
- Mrs. Rachel Huffington (voiced by Catherine Disher) is the wife of Mr. Huffington, mother of Baby Huffington, and sister of the Bunny Scout Leader.
- Mr. Clark Huffington (voiced by Jeff Pustil) is the husband of Mrs. Huffington, father of Baby Huffington, and brother-in-law of the Bunny Scout Leader.
- Valerie (voiced by Loretta Jafelice) is Ruby's second best friend; she has brown fur and wears glasses.
- Martha (voiced by Catherine Disher in seasons 1-2, and Tajja Isen in seasons 3-5) is a friend of Ruby; she has gold fur.
- Morris (voiced by Cameron Ansell in seasons 2–5 and Nicholas Fry in seasons 6–7) is Louise's three, later four-year-old cousin and Max's best friend. In seasons 6–7, Morris becomes interested in buttons.
- Roger Piazza (voiced by N/A in season 2, and Jo Vannicola in seasons 3-7) is the son of Mr. Piazza. He is older than Ruby and Louise, standing at 7 1/2 years old.
- Bunny Scout Leader (voiced by Sarah Adams and Nadine Rabinovitch) is the leader of the Bunny Scouts, Mrs. Huffington's sister, Mr. Huffington's sister-in-law and Baby Huffington's maternal aunt.
- Mr. Piazza (voiced by Jamie Watson) runs the local market in East Bunnyhop and is the father of Roger.
- Candi (voiced by Linda Ballantyne) is the owner of the candy shop in East Bunnyhop.
- Rosalinda (voiced by Fiona Reid) is the owner of a gift shop that sells jewelry and collectibles and a friend of Max and Ruby's grandmother, Mary.
- Katie (voiced by Robin Duke) is the waitress and owner at the diner in East Bunnyhop.
- Miss Bunty (voiced by Judy Price) is Max's preschool teacher.
- Winston (voiced by Ethan Tavares) is one of Max's classmates who uses a wheelchair. He is also Max's second best friend.
- Lily (voiced by Isabella Leo) is one of Max's classmates who is also Max's best female friend.
- Priya (voiced by Laaibah Alvi) is one of Max's classmates who is also Max's second best female friend. She is from India.
- Mr. Estévez (voiced by Carlos Díaz) is Ruby, Louise, and Valerie's teacher in school. He is from Mexico.
- Antonio (voiced by Emilio Vírguez) is one of Ruby's classmates. He is Max and Ruby's new friend of hispanic descent.

== Production ==
Nelvana Limited and Silver Lining Entertainment Limited co-produced the show for its first five seasons (in 2005, Silver Lining was acquired by Chorion). 9 Story Media Group overtook producing the animation from Nelvana in season 3 (and continued animating the series for seasons 4 and 5 while Chorion co-produced at the same time); though Nelvana still handled production of the series.

The series was animated in Adobe Flash.

Shortly after Chorion and its division Silver Lining Entertainment Limited both closed their doors after season 5 finished production, Nelvana became the sole producer for the series and outsourced the animation to Atomic Cartoons.

Season 6 premiered on September 18, 2016, with a new main voice cast and an updated theme song, along with each episode now having 2 11-minute segments, rather than 3 7-minute segments like the previous five seasons.

In an interview with Nickelodeon, Wells has stated about Max and Ruby's unseen parents that "we don't see Max and Ruby's parents, because [she] believe[s] that kids resolve their issues and conflicts differently when they are on their own. The television series gives kids a sense about how these two siblings resolve their conflicts in a humorous and entertaining way." In the sixth season, the series finally introduced Max and Ruby's parents Mr. and Mrs. Bunny.

== Telecast and home media ==
Max & Ruby first aired on Treehouse TV in Canada on September 10, 2002. In the United States, the series first aired on Nick Jr. on August 26, 2002, then on Noggin on August 16, 2004. The series also featured a British English dub that first aired on Nick Jr. in the UK and Ireland on March 31, 2003.

Paramount Home Entertainment is the DVD distributor for the series in the United States, on behalf of Nickelodeon. As of March 29, 2012, 2.9 million DVD units of the series from Paramount have been sold in the U.S. These DVDs (see below) only have episodes from the first five seasons.

Main series
Name	Release date	Number of episodes	Episode titles
Max & Ruby's Christmas	October 26, 2004	12	"Max's Christmas" / "Ruby's Snow Queen" / "Max's Rocket Run"; "Ruby's Figure Eight" / "Ruby's Surprise Party" / "Ruby's Tent"; "Ruby's Tea Party" / "Max Is It" / "Ruby's Science Project"; "Ruby Writes a Story" / "Max's Dominoes" / "Grandma's Attic"
Springtime for Max & Ruby	March 1, 2005	12	"Max's Chocolate Chicken" / "Ruby's Beauty Shop" / "Max Drives Away"; "Camp Out" / "Ruby's Clubhouse" / "Max's Picnic"; "Ruby's Merit Badge" / "Max's Apple" / "Quiet Max"; "Max Misses the Bus" / "Max's Worm Cake" / "Max's Rainy Day"
Max & Ruby's Halloween	August 30, 2005	12	"Max's Halloween" / "Ruby's Leaf Collection" / "The Blue Tarantula"; "Ruby's Panda Prize" / "Ruby's Roller Skates" / "Ghost Bunny"; "Max's Shadow" / "Max Remembers" / "Ruby's Candy Store"; "Max's Thanksgiving" / "Max's Pretend Friend" / "Fireman Max"
Party Time with Max & Ruby	February 14, 2006	12	"Max's Birthday" / "Max's New Suit" / "Goodnight Max"; "Bunny Cakes" / "Bunny Party" / "Bunny Money"; "Max's Bug Salad" / "Ruby's Beach Party" / "Super Max to the Rescue"; "Hide & Seek" / "Max's Breakfast" / "Louise's Secret"
Afternoons with Max & Ruby	August 1, 2006	12	"Max's Froggy Friend" / "Max's Music" / "Max Gets Wet"; "Max's Dragon Shirt" / "Max's Rabbit Racer" / "Roger's Choice"; "Ruby's Hiccups" / "The Big Picture" / "Ruby's Stage Show"; "Ruby's Piano Practice" / "Max's Bath" / "Max's Bedtime"
Easter with Max & Ruby	March 13, 2007	12	"Ruby's Easter Bonnet" / "Max's Easter Parade" / "Max and the Easter Bunny"; "Ruby's Loose Tooth" / "Ruby Scores" / "Ruby's Sandcastle"; "Max's Work of Art" / "Max Meets Morris" / "Ruby's Scavenger Hunt"; "Max's Check Up" / "Max's Prize" / "Space Max"
Summertime with Max & Ruby	June 5, 2007	12	"Ruby's Lemonade Stand" / "Ruby's Rummage Sale" / "Ruby's Magic Act"; "Ruby's Hippity Hop Dance" / "Ruby's Bird Bath" / "Super Max Saves the World"; "Ruby's Pajama Party" / "Baby Max" / "Bunny Scout Brownies"; "Max's Valentine" / "Ruby Flies a Kite" / "Super Max"
A Merry Bunny Christmas	October 2, 2007	12	"Grandma's Present" / "Max and Ruby's Christmas Tree" / "Max's Snow Plow"; "Max's Snow Day" / "Max's Snow Bunny" / "Max's Mix Up"; "Max's Fireflies" / "Max and Ruby's Fashion Show" / "Ruby's Sing-a-Ling"; "Ruby's Puppet Show" / "Sugar Plum Max" / "Max's Ant Farm"
Berry Bunny Adventures	February 26, 2008	12	"Grandma's Berry Patch" / "Ruby's Bunny Scout Banner" / "Ruby's Detective Agency"; "Surprise Ruby" / "Ruby's Birthday Party" / "Ruby's Birthday Present"; "Ruby's Safari" / "Max's Mud Bath" / "Max's Lost Lizard"; "Ruby Riding Hood" / "Max and the Beanstalk" / "The Froggy Prince"
Perfect Pumpkin	August 26, 2008	12	"Max and Ruby's Perfect Pumpkin / "Max's Jack O Lantern" / "Max's Big Boo"; "Max's Rocket Racer" / "Max and Morris Blast Off" / "Max's Candy Apple"; "Ruby Delivers" / "Getting Crabby at the Beach" / "Max Babysits"; "Max Cleans Up" / "Max's Cuckoo Clock" / "Ruby's Jewelry Box"
Playtime with Max & Ruby!	January 5, 2010	12	"Max's Thanksgiving" / "Max's Pretend Friend" / "Fireman Max"; "Ruby's Figure Eight" / "Ruby's Surprise Party" / "Ruby's Tent"; "Max Misses the Bus" / "Max's Worm Cake" / "Max's Rainy Day"; "Ruby's Piano Practice" / "Max's Bath" / "Max's Bedtime"
A Visit with Grandma	June 15, 2010	12	"Grandma's Treasure Hunt" / "Ruby's Jigsaw Puzzle" / "Ruby's Recital"; "Ruby's Rainbow" / "Home Tweet Home" / "Max's Mudpie"; "Ruby's Home Run" / "Ruby's Missing Tune" / "Ruby's Handstand"; "Ruby's Good Neighbor Report" {"Ruby's Report") / "Candy Counting" / "Ruby's New Shoes"
Everybunny Loves Winter	September 21, 2010	12	"Ruby's Snowbunny" / "Ruby's Snowflake" / "Duck Duck Goose"; "Ruby's Gingerbread House" / "Max's Christmas Passed" / "Max's New Year"; "Ruby's Horn of Plenty" / "Ruby's Big Kick" / "Max Says Goodbye"; "Max's Balloon Buddies" / "Ruby's Penny Carnival" / "Ruby's Big Win"
Bunny Tales	January 11, 2011	12	"The Princess and the Marbles" / "Emperor Max's New Suit" / "Max and the 3 Little Bunnies"; "Ruby's Real Cinderella" / "Ruby's Hoola Hoop" / "Max and the Martians"; "Max's Castle" / "Bunny Hopscotch" / "Max's Grasshopper"; "Ruby's Water Lily" / "Max Saves the Parade" / "Super Max's Cape"
Rainy Day Play	April 12, 2011	12	"Ruby Writes a Story" / "Max's Dominoes" / "Grandma's Attic"; "Bunny Cakes" / "Bunny Party" / "Bunny Money"; "Ruby's Safari" / "Max's Mud Bath" / "Max's Lost Lizard"; "Ruby's Rainbow" / "Home Tweet Home" / "Max's Mudpie"
Everybunny Loves Spring	February 11, 2014	12	"Max and Ruby's Groundhog Day" / "Ruby's First Robin of Spring" / "Grandma's Geraniums"; "Max's Ducky Day" / "Ruby's Earth Day Checklist" / "Ruby's Earth Day Party"; "Ruby Gets The Picture" / "Ruby's Birdie" / "Max Plays Catch"; "Max's Night Light" / "Ruby's Bird Walk" / "Max Goes Fishing"
Sweet Siblings	February 17, 2015	12	"Max Says Hello" / "Ruby's Spa Day" / "Ruby's Tai Chi"; "Engineer Max" / "Max's Toy Train" / "Max's Train Ride"; "Max and Ruby's Train Trip" / "Go to Sleep Max" / "Conductor Max"; "Space Bunny" / "Max's Sprinkler" / "Max's Pogo Stick"
Sharing and Caring	June 2, 2015	12	"Picture Perfect" / "Detective Ruby" / "Super Bunny Saves the Cake"; "Max's Ride" / "Max on Guard" / "Ruby's Real Tea Party"; "The Bunny Who Cried Lobster" / "Max and the Three Bears" / "Little Ruby Hen"; "Ruby's Autograph" / "A Toy For Baby Huffington" / "Max's Big Dig"

Episodes on Nick Jr. compilation DVDs
Name	Release date	Number of episodes	Episode titles
Nick Jr. Celebrates Spring	March 2, 2004	1	"Max's Chocolate Chicken"
Nick Jr. Favorites Vol. 1	May 24, 2005	3	"Max's Work of Art" / "Max Meets Morris" / "Ruby's Scavenger Hunt"
Nick Jr. Favorites Vol. 2	October 18, 2005	3	"Ruby's Lemonade Stand" / "Ruby's Rummage Sale" / "Ruby's Magic Act"
Nick Jr. Favorites Vol. 3	February 7, 2006	3	"Ruby's Pajama Party" / "Baby Max" / "Bunny Scout Brownies"
Nick Jr. Favorites Vol. 4	June 6, 2006	3	"Max Cleans Up" / "Max's Cuckoo Clock" / "Ruby's Jewelry Box"
Nick Jr. Favorites Holiday	September 26, 2006	3	"Max's Christmas" / "Ruby's Snow Queen" / "Max's Rocket Run"
Nick Jr. Favorites Vol. 5	March 13, 2007	3	"Ruby Writes a Story" / "Max's Dominoes" / "Grandma's Attic"
