= Sugarplum =

Sugarplum is a common name for several plants and may refer to:

- Amelanchier canadensis, native to eastern North America
- Diospyros virginiana
- Prune plum (Prunus domestica subsp. domestica)

It may also refer to:

- A composition by jazz pianist Bill Evans from his 1971 album The Bill Evans Album

== See also ==
- Sugar plum, a type of candy
