= Rosemary Wells =

American writer and children's book illustrator

- Born: January 29, 1943 (age 83); New York City, U.S.
- Education: Boston Museum School
- Occupations: Freelance author and illustrator
- Years active: 1968–present
- Spouse: Thomas Moore Wells (m. 1963; died 2001)
- Children: 2
- Website: rosemarywells.com

Rosemary Wells is an American writer and illustrator of children's books who uses animal characters to address real human issues. Her book series Max & Ruby and Timothy Goes to School were both adapted into Canadian-animated preschool television series.

== Background & Career ==
Wells was born on 1943 in New York City and raised in Red Bank, New Jersey. Her mother was a ballerina with the Ballet Russe de Monte-Carlo and her father was a playwright. She began drawing at age two. Wells' family encouraged her artistic talents and love of stories. "Reading stories aloud was as much a part of my childhood as the air I breathed," she recalled.

When Wells was nineteen, she attended the Boston Museum School, where she studied illustration. Before becoming an author and illustrator, Wells worked as an art editor for Allyn and Bacon, Inc and as an art designer for Macmillan Publishing.

In 1963, she married architect Thomas Moore Wells, with whom she has two daughters.

In 1968, Wells published her first book, an illustrated version of Gilbert and Sullivan’s A Song to Sing, O!. In her career of more than 30 years, she has published more than 60 books.

Wells often uses animals as characters. In the children's journal Stone Soup, Wells explained that she writes using animals because it allows her to address sophisticated, controversial topics in ways children can understand and adults can accept. For example, Yoko tackles the thorny topic of racism. It is about a young Japanese kitten who, in the beginning, is ostracized when she brings in sushi for her school lunch. At the story's conclusion, she gains acceptance by hosting a school luncheon where everyone brings in food native to their family from around the world. Many of the animal characters, such as those in Max & Ruby, interact with one another much as humans would, while others such as McDuff, a West Highland Terrier, take on a more realistic role as the adopted pet of a young couple.

== Works ==
=== Children's books ===
- Impossible, Possum (1971), written by Ellen Conford
- A Hot Thirsty Day (1971), by Marjorie W. Sharmat
- Two Sisters and Some Hornets (1972), by Beryl Epstein and Dorrit Davis
- Unfortunately Harriet (1972)
- Noisy Nora (1973)
- Benjamin & Tulip (1973)
- Abdul
- Bingo
- Carry Me!
- Doris's Dinosaur
- Edward the Unready series
  - Edward Unready for School
  - Edward's Overwhelming Overnight
  - Edward in Deep Water
- Emily's First 100 Days of School
- Felix Feels Better
- Felix Stands Tall
- Fiona's Little Lie
- Fritz and the Mess Fairy
- Getting to Know You: Rodgers and Hammerstein Favorites
- Good Night Fred
- Goodnight Lucas
- Hazel's Amazing Mother
- I Love You: A Bushel and a Peck
- Kindergators series
  - Hands Off, Harry!
  - Miracle Melts Down
- Lassie
- Lassie Come-Home
- Love Waves
- Max & Ruby series
  - Baby Max & Ruby: Clean-Up Time
  - Baby Max & Ruby: Peek-a-Boo
  - Baby Max & Ruby: Red Boots
  - Baby Max & Ruby: Shopping
  - Bunny Cakes
  - Bunny Mail
  - Bunny Money
  - Bunny Party
  - Goodnight Max
  - Hooray for Max
  - Max & Ruby in Pandora's Box – Max & Ruby's First Greek Myth
  - Max & Ruby Play School
  - Max & Ruby's Bedtime Book
  - Max & Ruby's Busy Week
  - Max & Ruby's Midas: Another Greek Myth
  - Max & Ruby's Preschool Pranks
  - Max & Ruby's Show and Tell
  - Max & Ruby's Snowy Day
  - Max & Ruby's Storybook Collection
  - Max Cleans Up
  - Max Counts His Chickens
  - Max Drives Away
  - Max's ABC
  - Max's Bath
  - Max's Bedtime
  - Max's Birthday
  - Max's Breakfast
  - Max's Bunny Business
  - Max's Chocolate Chicken
  - Max's Christmas
  - Max's Christmas Stocking
  - Max's Dragon Shirt
  - Max's First Word
  - Max's New Suit
  - Max's Ride
  - Max's Snowsuit
  - Max's Toys
  - Max's Work of Art
  - Play with Max & Ruby
  - Read to Your Bunny
  - Ruby's Beauty Shop
  - Ruby's Cupcakes
  - Ruby's Falling Leaves
  - Ruby's Tea for Two
- McDuff series
  - McDuff and Friends
  - McDuff and the Baby
  - McDuff Comes Home
  - McDuff Goes to School
  - McDuff Moves In
  - McDuff Saves the Day
  - McDuff Steps Out
  - McDuff Stories
  - McDuff's Favorite Things
  - McDuff's Hide-and-Seek
  - McDuff's New Friend; reissued as McDuff's Christmas
  - McDuff's Wild Romp
- Morris's Disappearing Bag
- Mother Goose series (illustrator only)
  - My Very First Mother Goose
  - Here Comes Mother Goose
  - Mother Goose's Little Treasures
- My Kindergarten
- My Shining Star
- Night Sounds, Morning Colors
- Old MacDonald
- Otto Runs for President
- Peabody
- Shy Charles
- Sophie series
  - Sophie’s Christmas Surprise
  - Sophie’s Halloween Disguise
  - Sophie's Terrible Twos
  - Ten Kisses for Sophie
  - Time Out for Sophie
  - Use Your Words Sophie
- Stanley and Rhoda
- Stella's Starliner
- Tell Me a Trudy (illustrator only)
- The Bear Went Over the Mountain
- The Christmas Mystery (illustrator only)
- The Gulps (writer only, by Marc Brown)
- The Itsy Bitsy Spider
- The Miraculous Tale of the Two Maries
- Timothy Goes to School
- Voyage to the Bunny Planet series
  - First Tomato
  - The Island Light
  - Moss Pillows
- Yoko series
  - Yoko
  - Yoko Learns to Read
  - Yoko Writes Her Name
  - Yoko's Paper Cranes
  - Yoko's Show-and-Tell
  - Yoko's World of Kindness
  - Yoko Finds Her Way

=== Other books ===
- Fog Comes on Little Pig Feet (1972)
- John and the Rarey (1968) published by Funk & Wagnalls
- Following Grandfather
- Help Children Cope with Divorce
- Help Children Cope with Grief
- House in the Mail
- Lincoln and His Boys
- Mary on Horseback
- My Havana: Memories of a Cuban Boyhood, written with Secundino Fernandez, illustrated by Peter Ferguson
- On the Blue Comet, illus. Bagram Ibatoulline
- Red Moon at Sharpsburg
- Streets of Gold
- Through the Hidden Door
- Leave Well Enough Alone
- The Man in the Woods
- When No One Was Looking
- Little Bunny, Big Germs

== Awards and recognition ==
Rosemary Wells's books have received starred reviews from Kirkus Reviews, Publishers Weekly, Booklist, and Horn Book Magazine. She has been nominated for numerous awards, such as the Edgar Allan Poe Award, the Black-Eyed Susan Award, the Red Clover Award, and the Beehive Award. She has won the following:

- Irma S. and James H. Black Award, 1975 - Morris's Disappearing Bag
- Virginia Readers Choice Award, 1987 - Man in the Woods
- Boston Globe-Horn Book Award, 1989 - Shy Charles
- Parents' Choice Award, 2014 - Stella's Starliner
