= List of people from Spokane, Washington =

This is a list of people from Spokane, Washington. It includes individuals who were born in or lived in the city. A person who lives in or comes from Spokane, Washington, is known as a Spokanite.

== Authors ==
- Sherman Alexie, author
- Arthur C. Brooks, author
- David Eddings, author of The Belgariad and many other books
- Wilbur Crane Eveland, served in various functions as a US intelligence officer in the Arab East
- Quail Hawkins, bookseller and children's author
- Bruce Holbert, author, Washington State Book Award winner
- Katherine Kelley, journalist and author
- Kenn Nesbitt, Children's Poet Laureate (2013–2015)
- Jack Nisbet, author of several books on explorer David Thompson
- Shann Ray, author, American Book Award winner
- Rick Rydell, outdoor writer, worked at local radio stations as a radio talk show host
- David Shannon, author of No, David! and many other children's books
- Wayne Spitzer, author and low-budget horror filmmaker
- Terry Trueman, Printz Award-winning author of Stuck in Neutral and numerous other young adult novels
- Shawn Vestal, author, Washington State Book Award winner and recipient of the PEN/Robert W. Bingham Prize, former writer for The Spokesman Review
- Jess Walter, author, recipient of the 2006 Edgar Allan Poe Award

== Chefs and restaurateurs ==
- Sarah Minnick, chef owner at Lovely Hula Hands and Lovely's Fifty Fifty

== Comedians ==
- Kelsey Cook, stand up comedian
- Tom McTigue, actor and comedian, Baywatch, Quantum Leap, Boyhood
- Julia Sweeney, actor and comedian (appeared on Saturday Night Live)

== Convicted criminals ==
- Kevin Coe, convicted "South Hill rapist"
- Keith Hunter Jesperson, serial killer
- Jack Owen Spillman, serial killer
- Rollen Stewart, kidnapper
- Robert Lee Yates, serial killer

== Film, stage and television industry ==
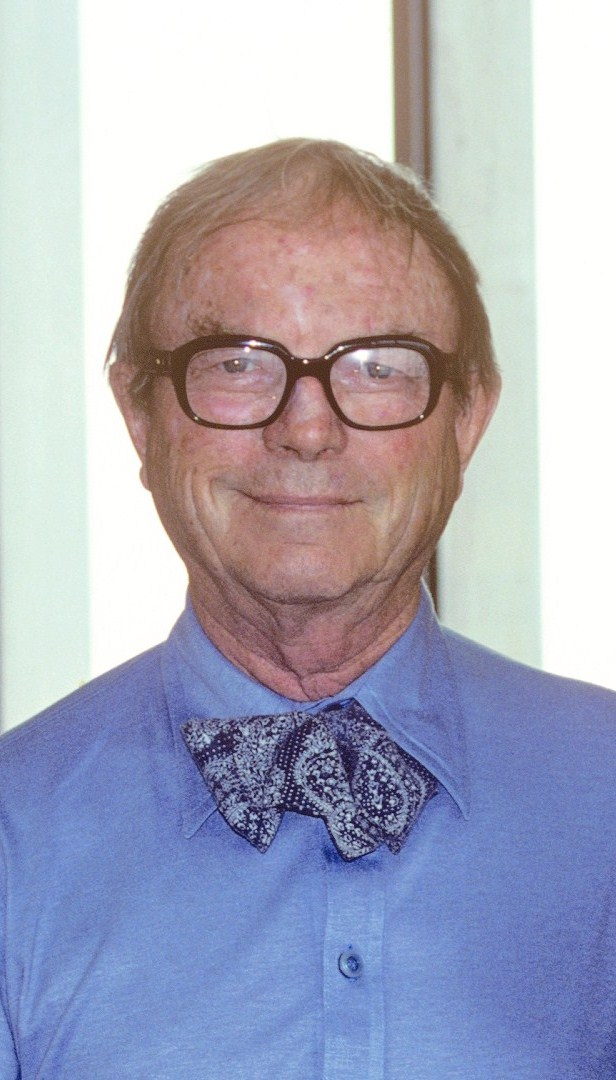
Chuck Jones

- Rick Alverson, film director
- Dyan Cannon, actress born in Tacoma, WA; attended North Central High School for the 9th grade before moving to Seattle with her family
- Sophia Anne Caruso, Broadway actress best known for playing Lydia Deetz in Beetlejuice: The Musical
- Gary Frank, Emmy Award-winning actor, known for playing Willie in the ABC series Family
- Russell Hodgkinson, actor
- Cheyenne Jackson, singer and actor, known for United 93
- Clifton James, film actor (Cool Hand Luke)
- Paul Johansson, actor, appeared in One Tree Hill
- Eric Johnston, former head of the United States Chamber of Commerce, former president of the Motion Picture Association of America
- Chuck Jones, director of animated films, three-time Academy Award winner
- Neil LaBute, film director/playwright
- David Lynch, film director, known for Blue Velvet and Twin Peaks
- Darren McGavin, actor, known for starring in Kolchak: the Night Stalker and A Christmas Story
- John McIntire, actor on Wagon Train and The Virginian
- Michele Morrow, actress, appeared in Basement Jack, The Young and the Restless, and Alias
- Craig T. Nelson, actor, star of television series Coach and Parenthood, as well as the films The Incredibles and Poltergeist
- Deanna Oliver, actress and writer, known for her role in The Brave Little Toaster and work with Animaniacs and Casper
- Seena Owen, silent-film actress
- Gale Page, actress, starred in Knute Rockne, All American with Ronald Reagan
- Patrick Page, Tony-nominated actor best known as Hades in Hadestown
- Susan Peters, actress
- Matt Piedmont, film director and writer
- Troy Robertson, reality TV star (Survivor, Survivor: One World, and Survivor: Game Changers)
- Trevor St. John, actor; known for his role on One Life to Live (graduated from Whitworth University)
- Wayne Spitzer, low-budget horror filmmaker
- Hilary Swank, two-time Oscar-winning actress (father was stationed at Fairchild Air Force Base)
- Sydney Sweeney, actress; best known for her role as Cassie Howard in Euphoria
- Tongolele, film and television actor
- Sarah Truax, stage and film actress, Spokane resident from 1912 to 1927
- Mary Ann Wilson, nurse and TV fitness instructor
- Michael Winslow, actor and comedian, known for Police Academy

== Artists ==
- Harold Balazs, sculptor
- Dominic Arizona Bonuccelli, photographer/traveller
- Kenneth Callahan, painter from the Northwest School
- Brian Crane, cartoonist
- Jerry Holkins, writer for Penny Arcade
- Mike Krahulik, artist for Penny Arcade
- Tom Kundig, principal at Olson Kundig Architects
- George Nakashima, furniture maker, entrepreneur
- Clyfford Still, abstract-expressionist painter
- Paula Mary Turnbull, welding nun

== Journalists ==
- Timothy Egan, journalist, winner of the National Book Award and the Washington State Book Award
- Neil Everett, journalist, ESPN SportsCenter anchor
- Julian Guthrie, journalist and author based in San Francisco
- Sue Herera, journalist, CNBC anchor
- Eric Johnson, journalist, former sports director for KREM 2; weeknight news anchor for KOMO 4
- John Richards, journalist, radio personality, producer of The Morning Show and Audioasis on 90.3 FM KEXP Seattle
- Rick Rydell, journalist, worked at local radio stations KJRB, KZZU, and KKZX as a radio talk show host

== Musicians ==
- Jim Boyd, musician
- Cami Bradley, America's Got Talent finalist and member of The Sweeplings
- Mike Clarke, member of the band The Byrds
- Bing Crosby, singer/actor
- Bob Crosby, bandleader and vocalist
- Paul D'Amour, former member of the band Tool
- Andra Day, singer-songwriter
- David Friesen, jazz bassist
- Calvin Hayes, British musician, co-founder and keyboardist for Johnny Hates Jazz
- Andy Gibson, singer-songwriter
- Theo Hakola, singer/songwriter, musician
- Dan Hamilton, member of Surf band The Ventures, Hamilton, Joe Frank & Reynolds, and The T-Bones
- Thomas Hampson, baritone
- Dan Hoerner, lead guitarist and backup vocalist for the band Sunny Day Real Estate
- Myles Kennedy, lead singer of the band Alter Bridge
- Keyboard Cat and his handler Charlie Schmidt, performer on a viral internet meme
- Ryan Lewis, music producer, primarily with Macklemore
- George Lynch, former member of the rock band Dokken; member of Lynch Mob
- Chad Mitchell, member of the Chad Mitchell Trio
- Craig Montoya, former member of the band Everclear
- Matty Mullins, lead singer of the band Memphis May Fire
- Patrice Munsel, former Metropolitan Opera star
- Danny O'Keefe, singer-songwriter
- Eckart Preu, conductor of the Spokane Symphony Orchestra
- Jimmy Rowles, jazz pianist
- Ann Sandifur, composer
- Scott Thompson, former member of the Canadian band Lillix
- Billy Tipton, jazz musician
- Kenny "Blues Boss" Wayne, boogie-woogie and blues-rock pianist
- Tyrone Wells, singer-songwriter
- Merrill Womach, undertaker, organist and gospel singer, founder of National Music Service

== Politicians ==
Civic

- James Everett Chase, mayor of Spokane
- Jack Geraghty, mayor of Spokane; former Spokane County commissioner
- Dennis P. Hession, mayor of Spokane
- John Powers, mayor of Spokane
- David H. Rodgers, mayor of Spokane
- Ron Sims, former member of the King County Council; former King County executive; former member of the United States Department of Housing and Urban Development
- Jon Snyder, member of the Spokane City Council
- John Talbott, mayor of Spokane
- Mary Verner, mayor of Spokane
- James E. West, Washington state senator and Spokane mayor

Federal

- Michael Baumgartner, U.S. congressman from Washington's 5th congressional district (2025–present)
- Ryan Crocker, U.S. diplomat, former U.S. ambassador to Iraq
- Tom Foley, U.S. congressman, former Democratic speaker of the United States House of Representatives, former US ambassador to Japan
- Eric Johnston, former head of the United States Chamber of Commerce, former president of the Motion Picture Association of America
- Mike McKevitt, U.S. congressman for Colorado's 1st congressional district (1971–73)
- Cathy McMorris Rodgers, U.S. congresswoman for Washington's 5th congressional district (2005–2025)
- George Nethercutt, former Republican U.S. congressman, judge and attorney
- Ron Sims, former deputy secretary of the U.S. Department of Housing and Urban Development

State

- Andy Billig, Washington state senator
- James M. Geraghty, Washington State Supreme Court justice
- Sam C. Guess, Washington state senator
- Jon Hansen, Washington state senator and Spokane mayor
- Samuel G. Havermale, early Spokane pioneer, minister and politician
- Horace E. Houghton, Washington and Wisconsin state legislator, lawyer
- B. R. Ostrander, Republican, served in the Washington House of Representatives 1889–1891
- Marcus Riccelli, Washington state representative
- James E. West, Washington state senator and Spokane mayor

== Science and technology ==
- Michael P. Anderson, astronaut killed in the 2003 Space Shuttle Columbia disaster
- Walter Houser Brattain, awarded the 1956 Nobel Prize in Physics
- Robert Dirks, computational chemist killed in a 2015 train wreck in New York
- Dorothy M. Horstmann, virologist, made important discoveries about polio
- Anne McClain, NASA astronaut, flight engineer for Expedition 58/59 to the International Space Station
- Wilder Graves Penfield, American-born Canadian neurosurgeon who mapped out the functional areas of the cerebral cortex and pioneered groundbreaking research into epilepsy treatment
- Irwin Rose, biologist awarded the 2004 Nobel Prize in Chemistry

== Sports ==
Auto racing

- Chad Little, NASCAR race winner
- Tom Sneva, Indianapolis 500 winner and IndyCar Series champion

Baseball

- Jeremy Affeldt, Major League Baseball (MLB) pitcher for the San Francisco Giants
- Ed Brandt, MLB pitcher (1928–38)
- Ed Kirkpatrick, former MLB outfielder and catcher
- Andrew Kittredge, pitcher for Tampa Bay Rays
- Larry Koentopp, Gonzaga University three-sport all-state selection, baseball head coach and athletic director
- Tyler Olson, pitcher for Cleveland Indians
- Mike Redmond, former MLB player for the Florida Marlins, Minnesota Twins, and Cleveland Indians; manager for the Marlins; (Gonzaga University graduate, 1993)
- Ryne Sandberg, 2005 inductee in the Baseball Hall of Fame, former second baseman for the Chicago Cubs, former MLB manager for the Philadelphia Phillies
- Kevin Stocker, former shortstop for the Philadelphia Phillies, Tampa Bay Devil Rays and Anaheim Angels; current analyst for the Pac-12 Network
- Christine Wren, second female professional baseball umpire

Basketball

- Malik Hall, basketball player in the Israeli Basketball Premier League
- Briann January, former Arizona State Sun Devils player; played for the WNBA's Indiana Fever (Lewis and Clark High School graduate, 2005)
- Adam Morrison, former Gonzaga player, former 2005–2006 first-team All-American, Charlotte Bobcats and Los Angeles Lakers basketball player (Mead High School graduate, 2003)
- John Stockton, NBA Hall of Fame former point guard for the Utah Jazz
- Wayne Tinkle, player for the Montana Grizzlies (Ferris High School graduate, 1984); former head coach for the Oregon State Beavers

Billiards

- Dorothy Wise, member of Billiard Congress of America Hall of Fame

Boxing

- Chauncy Welliver, professional boxer

Extreme sports

- Jess Roskelley, youngest American (at the time) to climb Mount Everest
- Eric Uptagrafft, sport shooter

Football

- Bob Bellinger, football player
- Erik Coleman, former Washington State Cougars football player, former player for the Atlanta Falcons and Detroit Lions (Lewis and Clark High School graduate, 2000)
- Joe Danelo, former kicker for the Green Bay Packers, the New York Giants, and the Buffalo Bills (graduated from WSU and Gonzaga Prep 1971)
- Will Davis, former defensive back for the Miami Dolphins, Baltimore Ravens, San Francisco 49ers, and Salt Lake Stallions of the AAF
- Steve Emtman, 1992 NFL No. 1 draft pick, former defensive lineman for the Indianapolis Colts
- Bill Etter, held the Notre Dame record for the most rushing yards by a quarterback in a single game—146 yards
- Steve Gleason, NFL former special teams player for the New Orleans Saints and a graduate of WSU and Gonzaga Prep
- Jason Hanson, former kicker with the Detroit Lions
- Max Krause, running back for the New York Giants and Washington Redskins
- Dan Lynch, first team All-American for Washington State University (Lewis & Clark High School graduate 1980)
- Steve Parker, former NFL defensive end for the New Orleans Saints
- Brett Rypien, NFL quarterback for the Minnesota Vikings; Shadle Park High School, Boise State University
- Mark Rypien, former quarterback for the Washington Redskins; Most Valuable Player of 1991 Super Bowl; Shadle Park High School, Washington State University
- Bishop Sankey, former NFL running back for the Tennessee Titans (attended Gonzaga Preparatory School)
- Cory Withrow, former NFL center for the St. Louis Rams
- John Yarno, former NFL offensive lineman (attended Gonzaga Preparatory School and Ferris High School)

Hockey

- Bob Attwell, Spokane native who played 22 games in the NHL
- Patrick Dwyer, Spokane native who last played for the NHL's Carolina Hurricanes
- Tyler Johnson, former Spokane Chiefs player and 2008 Memorial Cup winner plus back-to-back Stanley Cup winner with the Tampa Bay Lightning
- Derek Ryan, Spokane native currently playing for NHL's Edmonton Oilers
- Kailer Yamamoto, Spokane native currently playing for NHL's Seattle Kraken

Mixed martial arts

- Michael Chiesa, Ultimate Fighter winner and current UFC lightweight
- Julianna Peña, Ultimate Fighter winner and former UFC women's bantamweight champion
- Sam Sicilia, Ultimate Fighter alumnus and former UFC featherweight

Rowing

- Joe Rantz, 1936 Summer Olympics gold medal winner in the eights competition

Soccer

- Chad Brown, midfielder and coach
- Amy LePeilbet, defender and coach

Tennis

- Jan-Michael Gambill, professional player

Track and field

- Madonna Buder, 75-year-old Catholic nun and oldest Hawaii Ironman Triathlete competitor
- Helga Estby, walked across the United States in 1896
- Fortune Gordien, Olympic silver and bronze medalist in discus throw
- Gerry Lindgren, runner, won 11 NCAA championships at Washington State University (attended John R. Rogers High School)
- Brad Walker, American record holder and two-time world champion in the pole vault (University High School graduate)

== Early Spokane notable residents ==
- Joe Albi, attorney and civic leader
- Kirtland Cutter, architect, known for his work in Spokane, including the Davenport Hotel
- Sonora Smart Dodd, successfully campaigned for the establishment of Father's Day
- Helga Estby, Norwegian-American resident of the Spokane area; in 1896 walked across America from Spokane to New York City
- James Geraghty, Spokane City corporate counsel
- Alice Houghton, broker
- Henry John Kaiser, industrialist
- Maude McClaine, aviatrix and first woman in Spokane to hold a pilot's license

Native Americans

- Chief Garry, one of the Spokane tribes' most prominent and influential leaders during the shift from indigenous to European-American control of their land

Military

- John Babcock, last Canadian veteran of World War I
- David P. Jenkins, Civil War colonel, Spokane homesteader, and philanthropist

== Other ==
- Jimmy Marks, Romani American who sued Spokane
- Greg Zanis, carpenter who founded Crosses for Losses
