= Ostrander =

Ostrander may refer to:

== People ==
- Arthur Frederick Ostrander (1895–1978), American scientist
- B. R. Ostrander (1843–1922), American politician
- Elaine Ostrander (born 1958), American geneticist
- Fannie Ostrander (1859–1921), American writer
- Isabel Ostrander (1883–1924), American author
- James W. Ostrander (1825–1913), American politician
- John Ostrander (born 1949), American author
- Josh Ostrander, American singer-songwriter
- Linda Woodaman Ostrander (born 1937), American composer
- Rick Ostrander, American academic
- Russell C. Ostrander (1851–1919), American jurist
- T. C. Ostrander (born 1985), American football player

== Places ==
=== United States ===
- Ostrander, Minnesota
- Ostrander, Ohio
- Ostrander, Washington
- Ostrander, Wisconsin, unincorporated community
- Ostrander Lake, in Yosemite National Park
- Ostrander Lake (Michigan)
