= Dominic Arizona Bonuccelli =

American photographer

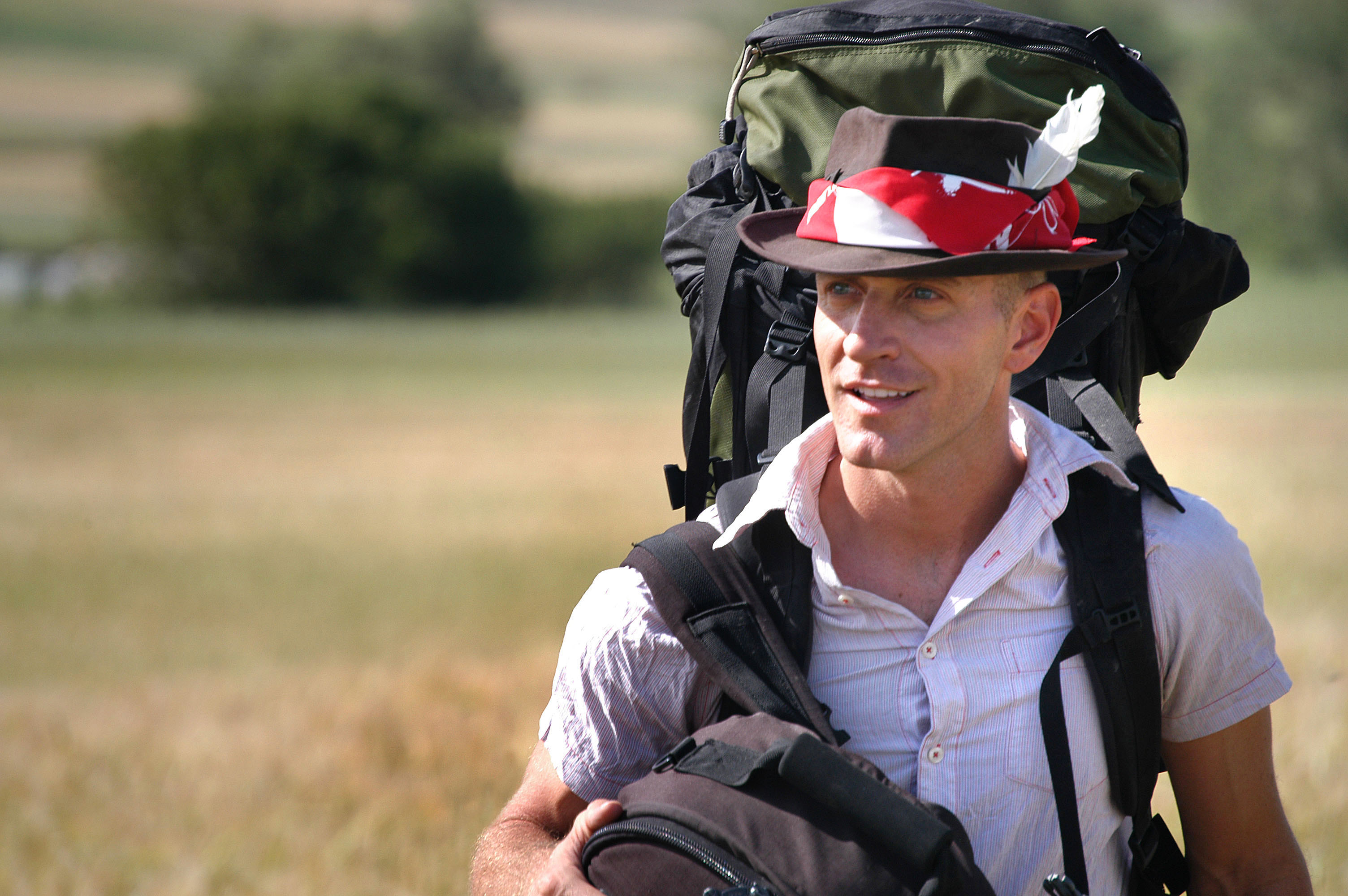
- A picture of Dominic Arizona Bonuccelli
- Born: Spokane, Washington
- Occupations: Photographer and television host
- Known for: Photography

Dominic Arizona Bonuccelli is a professional photographer, television host and world traveler. Dominic spent several months on assignment co-hosting the travel TV series Lonely Planet: Roads Less Travelled, Lonely Planet: Stressbuster, and photographing every country in Europe for Rick Steves since 1996.

A graduate of the USC School of Cinematic Arts with a degree in Film Production/Cinematography, he is represented by Getty Images (NY), AGE Fotostock (Spain) and Lonely Planet Images (Australia). His award-winning editorial work has been featured in Variety, Forbes, The Wall Street Journal, Lonely Planet and Rick Steves' Europe Through the Backdoor guidebooks. His coverage of celebrities includes Steve Carell, Sherman Alexie, Sir Kenneth Branagh, photo and film projects for Irish tenor Michael Londra, a concert film entitled Beginnings for Celtic world band An Dóchas, and numerous years covering the Seattle International Film Festival.

== Early life ==
Bonuccelli was born and raised in Spokane, Washington and has been called "Spokane's most famous photographer."

== Career ==
=== Photography ===
Dominic Bonuccelli is the main Travel Photographer for Rick Steves’ Europe Through the Backdoor, the creators of the televised travel-show spawned from the guidebook & touring company based in Edmonds, WA USA

Participating artist in the MTV/VH1 Hope for Haiti Now: A Global Benefit for Earthquake Relief, backed by George Clooney and Haiti-born rapper Wyclef Jean, broadcast January 2010 and raising US $61 million to benefit those directly affected by the 2010 Haiti earthquake. Dominic’s Haitian photographs provided the backdrops for performances by Shakira, Dave Matthews, Neil Young, Leonardo DiCaprio and others.

Author and photographer in the SMITH Magazine 2008 New York Times Best Selling book Not Quite What I Was Planning: Six-Word Memoirs, with a cast of fellow participants including Stephen Colbert, Deepak Chopra, Moby and others.

Throughout his career, Bonuccelli has photographed various public figures and celebrities, including the 14th Dalai Lama, Sir Kenneth Branagh, Steve Carell. Being the main photographer for MovieMaker Magazine, he had the opportunity to cover stars as Mark Ruffalo, Melanie Lynskey, Channing Tatum.

Dominic has also created film projects for Irish tenor Michael Londra, a concert film entitled Beginnings for Celtic world band An Dóchas, and numerous years covering the Seattle International Film Festival.

=== Television ===
Dominic began his career as a Television Host in 2009, as a co-host for the travel TV series Lonely Planet: Roads Less Travelled. The series air internationally since November 2009 on the National Geographic Adventure Channel, hunting down new travel experiences in Colombia, Spain, and northern Mexico.

In 2011 Dominic AZ Bonuccelli and Anita Kapoor became co-hosts of the Television show Lonely Planet's Stressbuster. The 8 episode documentary aired on Discovery Channel (Asia) and Travel + Escape Channel in Canada. Stressbuster was shot in Sri Lanka, India, China, Tibet. The show's first episode won the Best Lifestyle Program Award by Asian Television Award.

TV Host for 3 episodes of Subaru Eco Adventure Roadtrips. The show airs on BBC America, filmed in the US (Desert Southwest, Southern California, and the Florida Keys)

Dominic appeared with Carla Turco on a 2014 episode for Ex-Wives of Rock as Athena Kottak's photographer.
