= Sullivan Hall (Seattle University) =

Building in Seattle, Washington, U.S.

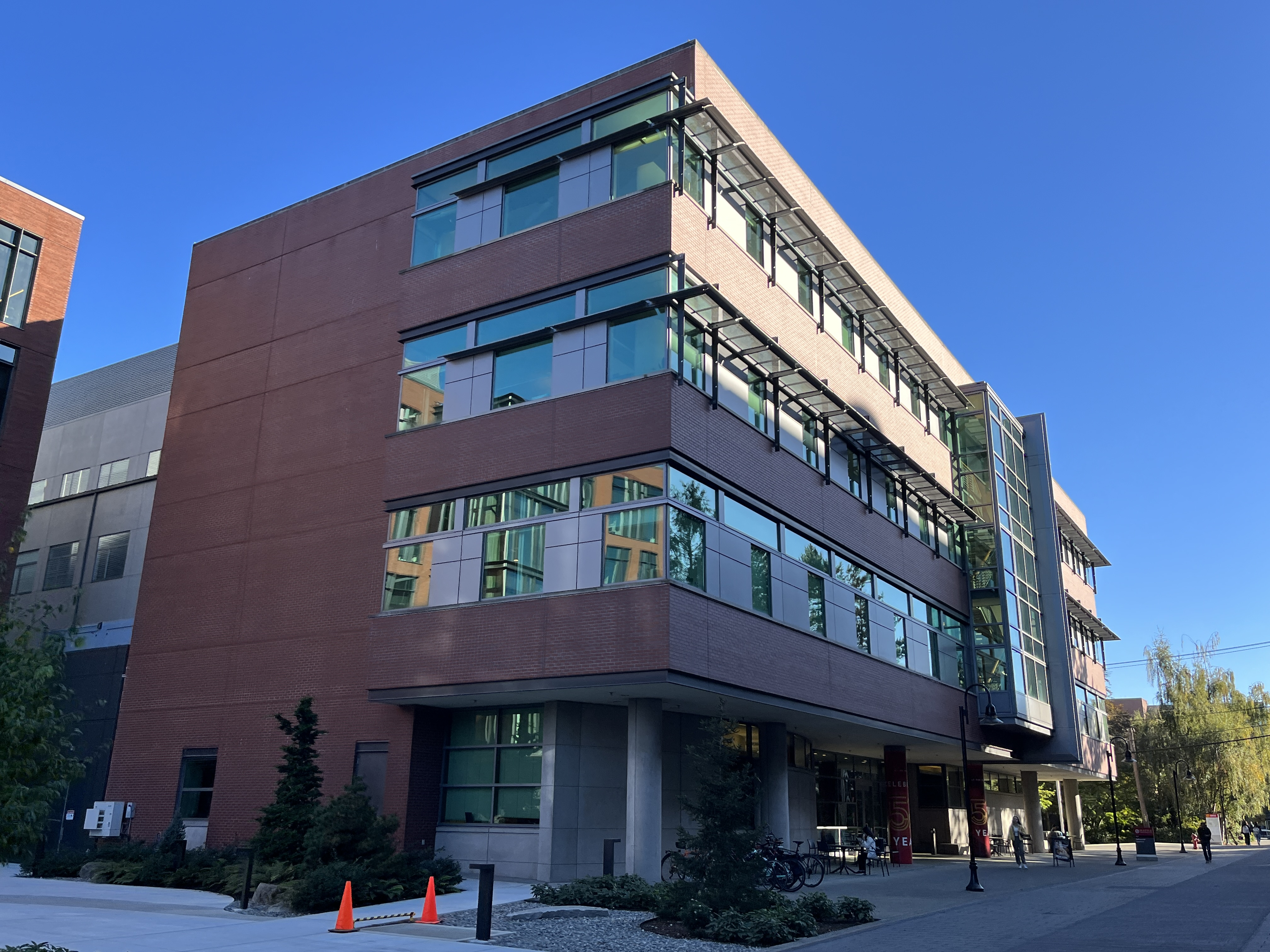
- The building's exterior, 2022
- Interactive map of the Sullivan Hall area

General information
- Location: Seattle, Washington, United States
- Coordinates: 47°36′34.5″N 122°19′1.5″W

Sullivan Hall (also known as the Law Building) is a building on the Seattle University campus, in the U.S. state of Washington. The building houses the Seattle University School of Law.

Designed by Olson/Sundberg, the 135,000 square foot building was completed in August 1999 and cost approximately $21 million.

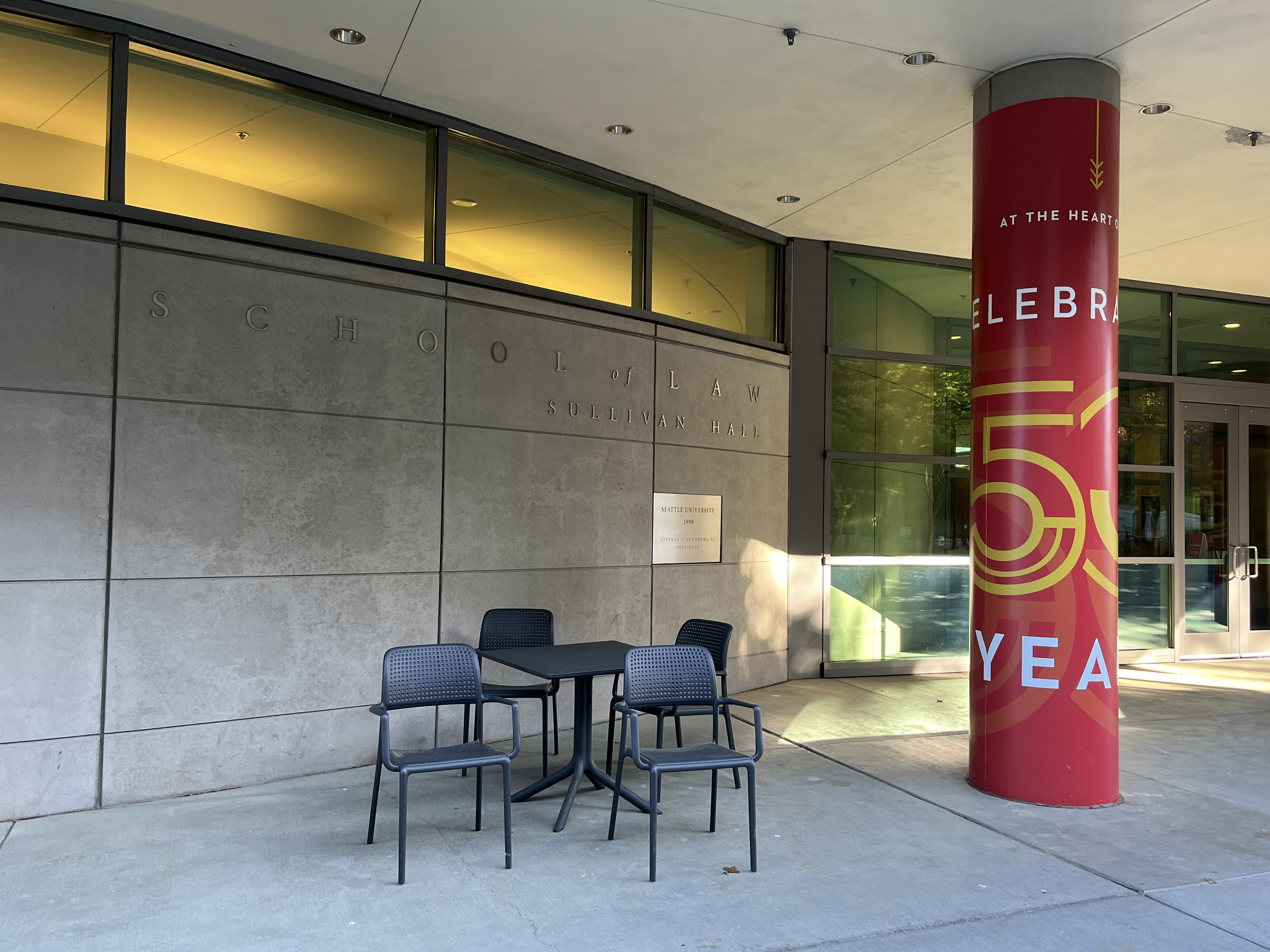
Exterior

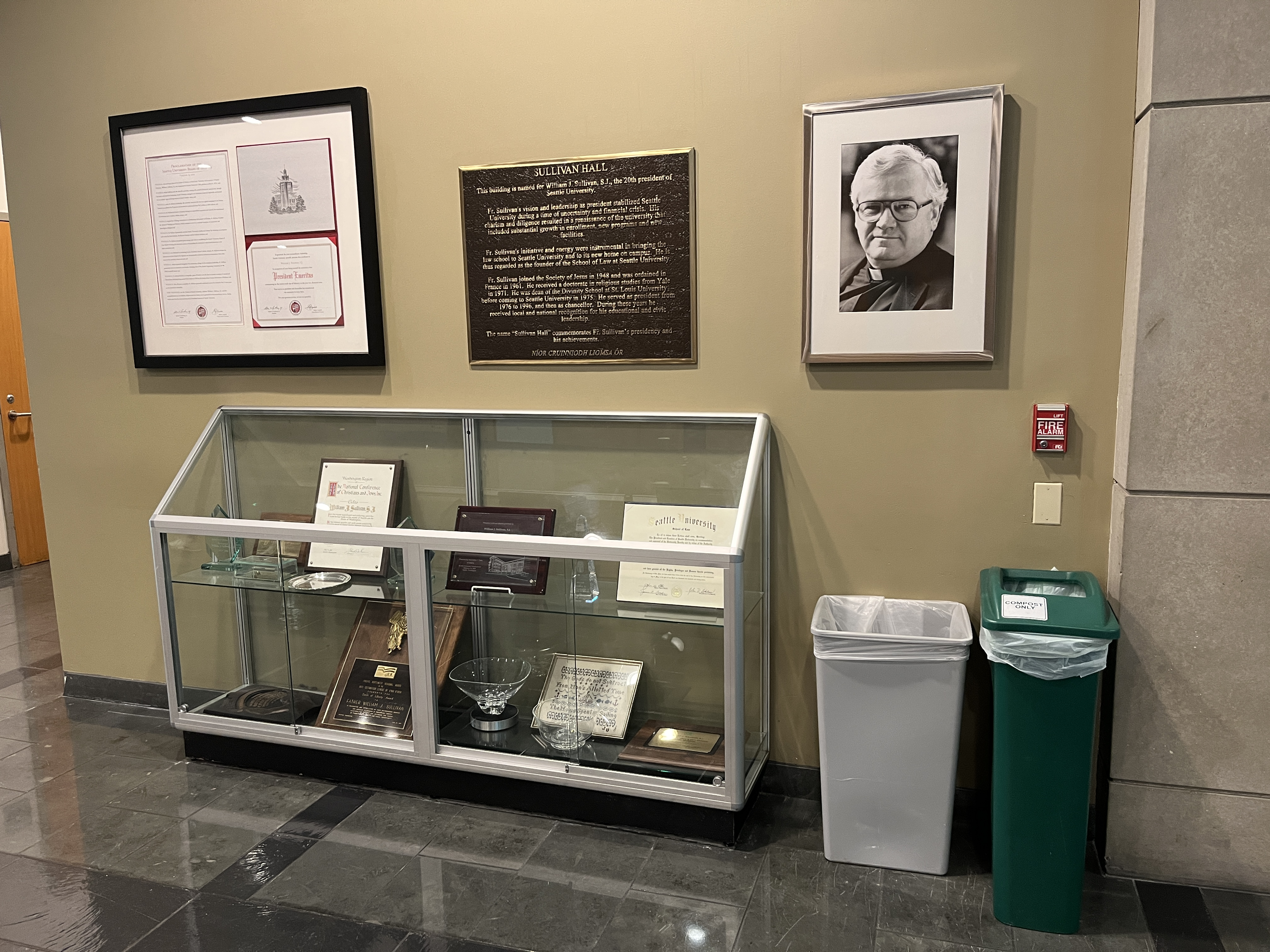
Interior

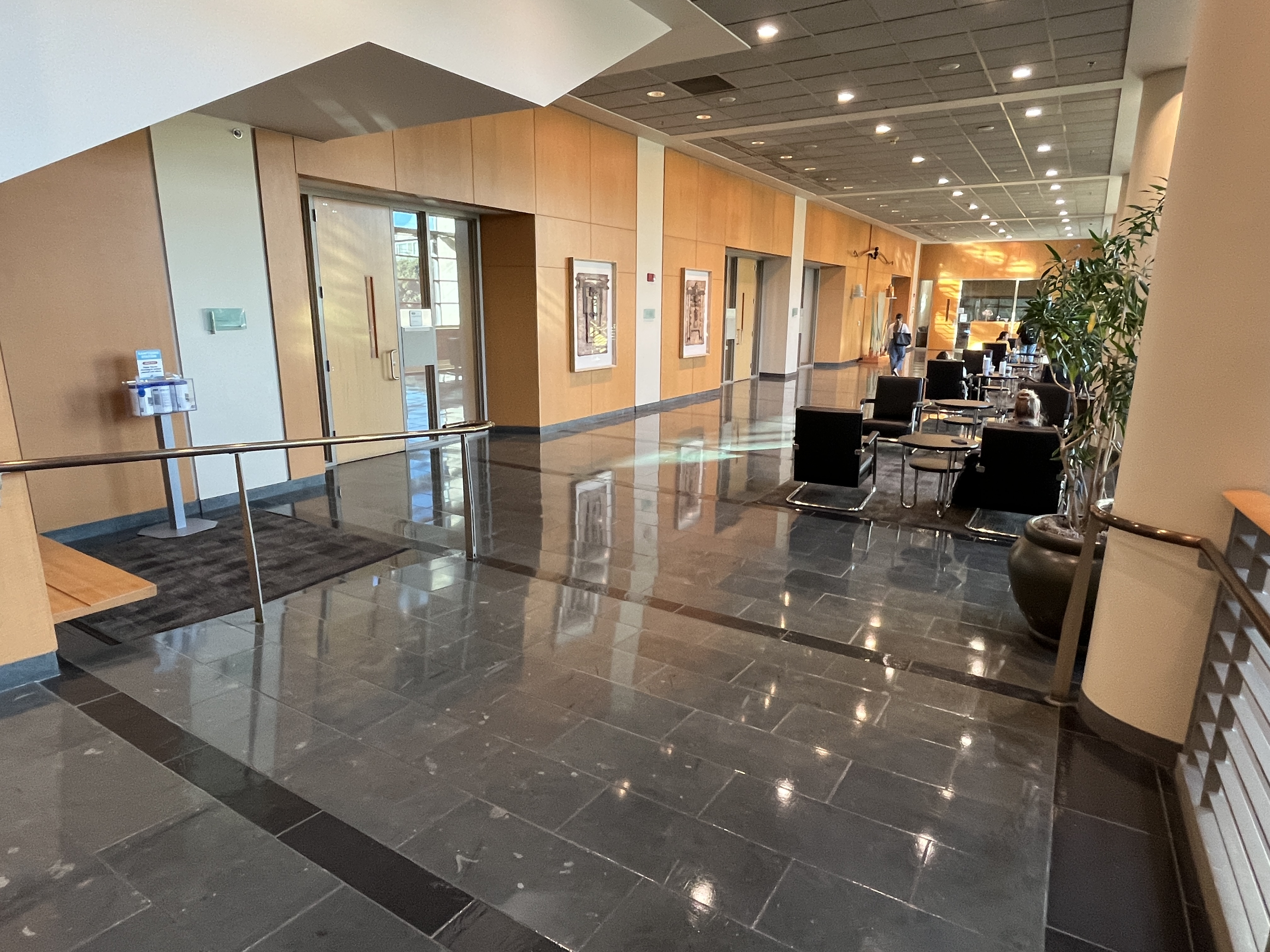
Interior

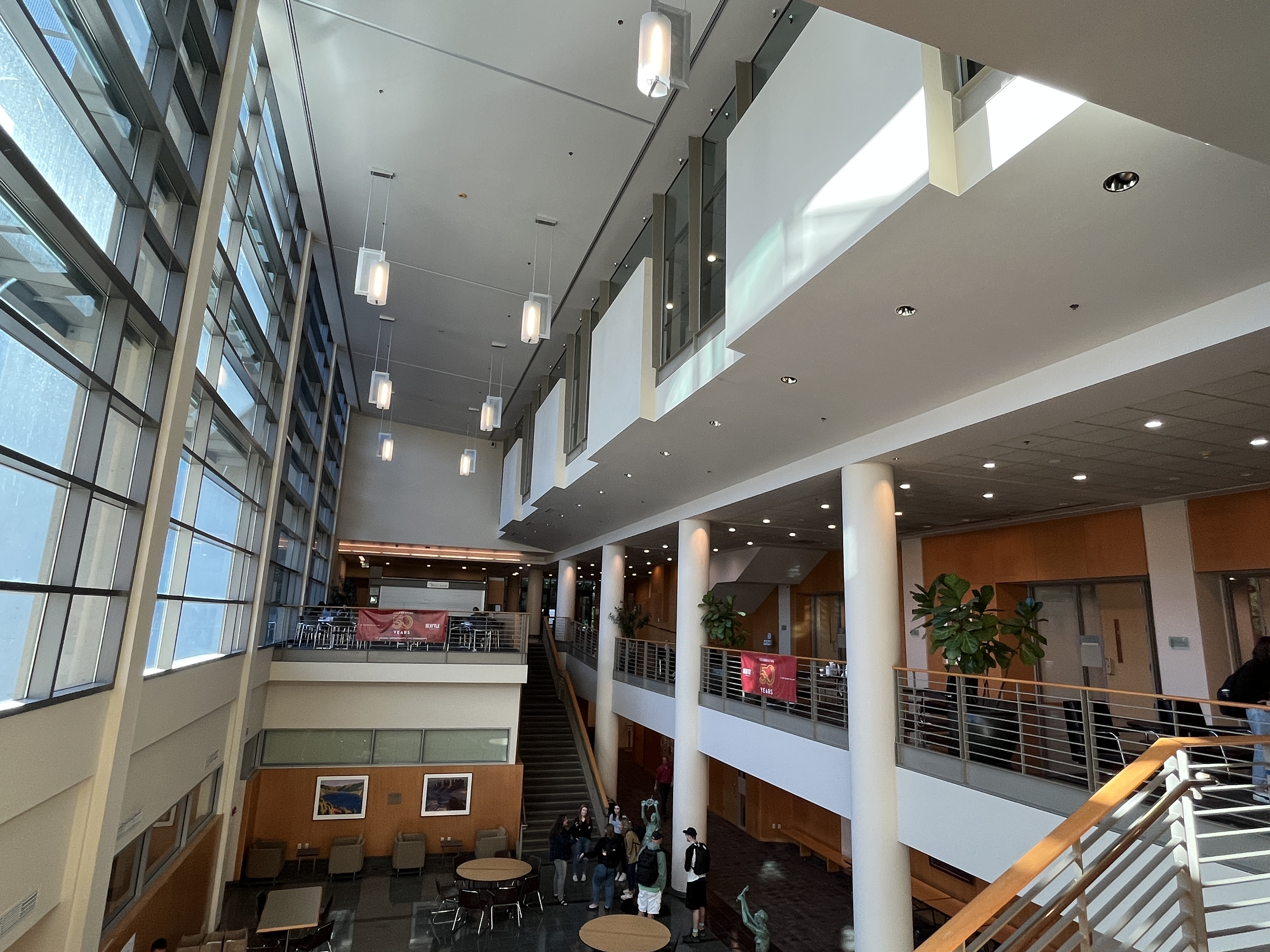
Interior
