= Jim Olson =

American architect

In Residence Jim Olson - inside the architect's treetop house, video from Nowness by Stephen McGehee

Jim Olson, FAIA (b. 1940) is the founding principal of the Seattle-based firm Olson Kundig Architects. He is best known for residential design, often for art collectors, though his designs have also included museums, commercial spaces and places of worship. In 2006, William Stout Publishers released Art + Architecture: The Ebsworth Collection and Residence. His honors include the 2007 Seattle AIA Medal of Honor, selection as the 1999 Bruce Goff Chair of Creative Architecture at the University of Oklahoma, and his induction in 1990 as a Fellow of the American Institute of Architects. He is an honorary trustee to the Seattle Art Museum, and a founding trustee of Artist Trust, and Center on Contemporary Art, both in Seattle. Olson received a bachelor of architecture degree from the University of Washington.

== Notable works ==
- Noah’s Ark, Skirball Cultural Center, Los Angeles (2007)
- The Ebsworth Residence, Seattle (2004)
- Red House, Denver (1999)
- St. Mark's Cathedral Renovation, Seattle (1998)
- The Gallery House, Washington (1987)
- Hillclimb Court, Seattle (1985)
- Pike & Virginia Building, Seattle (1978)
- Earth House, Washington (1969)
