= A Bad Case of Stripes =

1998 children's book written and illustrated by David Shannon

- Cover of book
- Author: David Shannon
- Illustrator: David Shannon
- Language: English
- Genre: Children's literature
- Published: 1998
- Publisher: Blue Sky Press (an imprint of Scholastic Press)
- Publication place: United States of America
- Pages: 33 (unpaginated)

A Bad Case of Stripes is a children's book written and illustrated by David Shannon published in 1998 by Blue Sky Press, a division of Scholastic Press. A Bad Case of Stripes highlights the theme of being true to oneself, and is commonly used by educators to teach young students important values. Amongst some negative responses, this children's book is also praised for its creativity, illustrations, and meaningful lessons.

== Plot summary ==
The main character is a girl named Camilla Cream who secretly loves lima beans, but refuses to eat them because her friends dislike them and Camilla wants to fit in.

On the first day of school, she tries on over forty different outfits in an attempt to be fashionable. After she puts on a red dress, she discovers thick, solid-colored stripes all over her body. The family's physician, Dr. Bumble, determines that Camilla is well enough to attend school tomorrow. When she does the next day, her classmates tease her and call out different patterns which cause the colors on her skin to shift around. The principal notifies Camilla's parents that she is proving to be a distraction and won't be allowed back in school until the stripes disappear.

At home, Camilla goes through a number of increasingly preposterous metamorphoses. After taking medication prescribed by Dr. Bumble and his specialists, she turns into a giant pill. She later has viruses, bacteria, and fungus colonies grow on her body after the community's scientific experts discuss these as a possible cause to her situation while examining her. She even grows roots, berries, crystals, feathers, and a long furry tail as a result of different specialists all prescribing their own treatments. Finally, she melts and merges into her room after an "environmental therapist" tells her to "become one with her room".

Just when it seems as if her parents are about to lose all hope, an old woman suddenly appears and accurately diagnoses Camilla's ailment. The cure, as it turns out, is lima beans. Camilla is afraid to admit her willingness to eat them at first, but when the old woman is about to leave, she suddenly realizes that nothing could make her condition worse and allows the woman to feed her. Camilla is instantly turned back into a human. She is later shown wearing a multi-colored bow in her hair while eating lima beans; although her friends consider her strange for liking them, she doesn't care. She enjoys being different and never has stripes again.

== Analysis ==
=== Themes ===
A Bad Case of Stripes discusses ethics and metaphysics, by highlighting self-perception, identity, and bullying. A Bad Case of Stripes teaches a lesson about the importance of being one's true self through a lima bean metaphor. In the beginning of the book, Camilla conforms to peer pressure, which is shown through her chameleon-like trait of blending into her surroundings. Camilla then learns about herself and her surroundings through her "nightmare metamorphosis." By the end of the book, Camilla “regains her identity when she is true to herself." In 2018, West Virginia First Lady, Cathy Justice, read this book to young children in honor of the Scholastic Summer Reading Challenge. The reading highlighted the book's theme of teaching "children to be themselves and to respect those who may be different."

=== Pedagogy ===
A Bad Case of Stripes is popular in the curricula of many elementary schools. A 2004 study found that it was a common read-aloud book for fourth-graders in schools in San Diego County, California. A 2007 online poll, the National Education Association listed the book as one of its "Teachers' Top 100 Books for Children."

According to an elementary school teacher in Pawtucket, Rhode Island, Donna M. Sawyer, Shannon's story encourages students to consider their own experiences to develop a personal connection. Sawyer uses comprehension instruction with her third-graders to teach A Bad Case of Stripes. To increase student's participation level, she incorporates both class-wide and small-group discussion and activities over many classes. For the students, this participation includes finding ways they connect to Camilla, organizing book details "into a story circle visual structure," and creating episode analysis charts addressing Camilla's problem, response, actions, and outcome.

A Bad Case of Stripes has also been used in classrooms to prevent bullying. One teacher from Comber, Ontario, Lisa Babula, incorporated a read-aloud, journal reflections, and discussion in literature response groups into three 40-minute class periods. Online games about bullying and an exercise creating a hypothetical problem and solutions were also included in the lesson plan. These activities focus on understanding Camilla's emotions and addressing the issue of bullying.

Another approach to teaching A Bad Case of Stripes is using it to encourage students to eat their vegetables and to be brave about eating healthily. Students are told to make signs for the cafeteria promoting healthy eating because like Camilla, there are some foods that students might be afraid to eat with their friends.

== Reception ==
Kirkus Reviews found that "Shannon's story is a good poke in the eye of conformity—imaginative, vibrant, and at times good and spooky—and his emphatic, vivid artwork keeps perfect pace with the tale." A review by Sandra L. Tidwell said that "Shannon's colored illustrations are vibrant and animated, and they show a particular talent for vividly portraying facial expressions." A review by The Record highlights the children book's applicability to all ages, stating that in addition to the entertainment and life-lessons the children benefit from, it "offers adults a giggle or two." A Florida Times Union review states that A Bad Case of Stripes is "funny and entertaining," supported perfectly by "lighthearted, bright, detailed illustrations." It also received the 1999 Montana Treasure State Picture Book Award.

A review by Carolyn Noah presents a somewhat negative take, calling the book "disturbing" and "viscerally troubling." The book addresses anti-peer pressure, but also juggles dark humor. The review states that the book's "grotesque," "eye-popping," and "oppressive" images will haunt the children reading.

A Bad Case of Stripes has also received mixed reviews. A librarian at the University of New Brunswick, Lesley Beckett Balcom, recommends the book with reservations, stating, "the sensational illustrations, bold and surreal, are the strength in a book that tries rather too hard to teach a lesson." An English teacher at Indiana University Northwest believes that A Bad Case of Stripes is "a little preachy at times," yet this is made up for with the "tongue-in-cheek fun" the illustrations bring to the story. A San Francisco Chronicle article describes Shannon's illustrations as "vibrant," "hilarious," and "horrific."
