= Poe Sisters =

Journalists in Washington, DC (20th c.)

Elisabeth Ellicott Poe
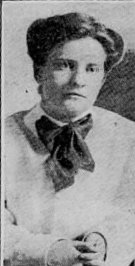
- Born: July 27, 1886; Philadelphia
- Died: September 29, 1947; Washington, D.C.
- Occupation: Artist

Vylla Poe Wilson
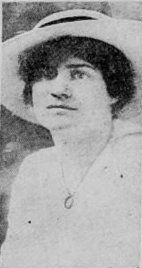
- Born: February 27, 1883; New Jersey
- Died: October 2, 1969; Washington, D.C.
- Occupation: Artist

Elisabeth "Bessie" Ellicott Poe (July 27, 1886-September 29, 1947) and Vylla Ellicott Poe Wilson (February 27, 1883-October 2, 1969) were journalists in Washington, DC. They sometimes collaborated on a woman's column under the name the Poe Sisters.

They were the daughters of inventor George Poe, Jr., a cousin of the writer Edgar Allan Poe. For most of their lives, they worked for mostly Washington DC newspapers, including the Washington Post, the Washington Times, the Washington Times-Herald, and King Features Syndicate, in a variety of editorial capacities, covering art, women's issues, and the White House.

During World War I, the Poe sisters were organizers of the Women's Section of the Navy League and its training camp for women in Chevy Chase, Maryland.

In 1933, Evalyn Walsh McLean, wife of Washington Post owner Edward Beale McLean, enlisted the sisters to briefly pawn the Hope Diamond on her behalf when she needed cash.

Together, the Poe sisters published the books Edgar Allan Poe: A High Priest of the Beautiful and Half-Forgotten Romances of American History. In 1930, they started a magazine called The Stylus, named after the periodical Edgar Allan Poe had planned. Both sisters were painters and exhibited their work locally. Elisabeth Poe exhibited more frequently and primarily painted watercolors.
