= Tom Kundig =

American architect

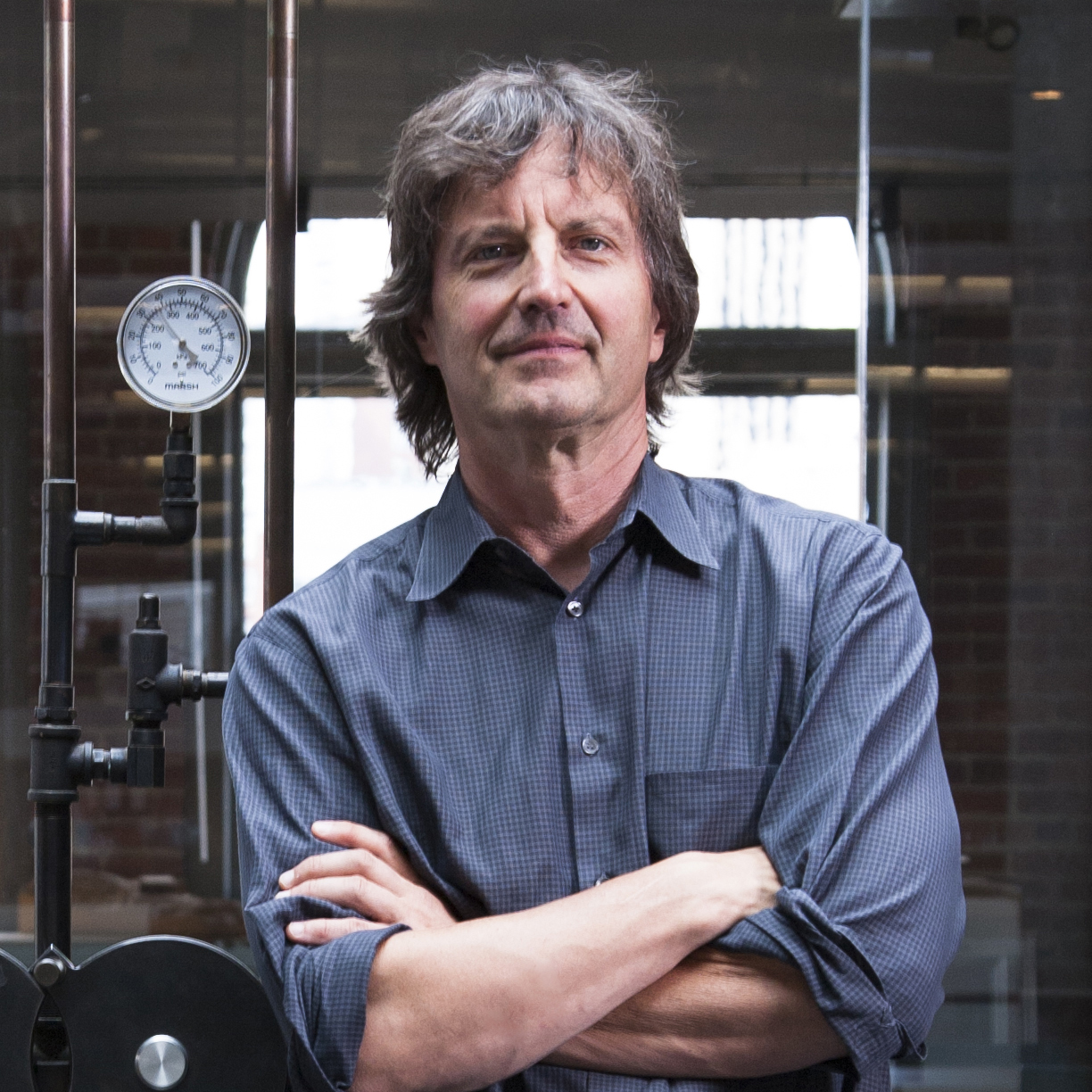
- Tom Kundig in Olson Kundig Architects
- Born: October 9, 1954 (age 72); Merced, California
- Education: University of Washington
- Occupation: Architect
- Practice: Olson Kundig Architects
- Buildings: The Pierre, Art Stable, Outpost, Rolling Huts, Delta Shelter, Chicken Point Cabin, The Brain, Studio House
- Projects: Tom Kundig Houses 2, Tom Kundig Houses

Tom Kundig (born 1954) is an American architect and principal in the Seattle-based firm Olson Kundig Architects. He has won numerous professional honors.

In 2015, Princeton Architectural Press released Tom Kundig: Works, a collection of Kundig's recent projects, including commercial spaces and public buildings. In 2011, Princeton Architectural Press released Tom Kundig: Houses 2, the follow-up to the 2006 book, Tom Kundig: Houses, one of the Press’s bestselling architecture books of all time. Kundig has been published over 450 times in publications worldwide, including the Financial Times, The Wall Street Journal, Architectural Record, Dwell, Architectural Digest and The New York Times. Kundig’s undergraduate and graduate architecture degrees are from the University of Washington.

== Early life and career ==
Kundig was born on October 9, 1954, in Merced, California, and raised in Spokane, Washington. As a teenager, he found early influences in his work at sawmills, his surroundings and his time spent hiking, skiing and climbing. "I experienced being relatively humble in the landscape," Kundig says about his childhood. "Mountaineering and architecture have many parallels—they're about solving the problem in as clear and economic means as possible—it's not about getting to the top." He also took inspiration from the sculptor Harold Balazs, who taught him that building a project is the most important part of the design process as well as how tough it is to be an artist.

In college, Kundig originally trained as a geophysicist before switching to architecture, his father's profession. In an interview with the National Building Museum, he says:

When I left for college, I was more interested in the hard sciences—physics and especially geophysics. I was fascinated by the movement of Earth tectonics and geology. The idea of these large forces that shape our Earth is still a really fascinating sidebar interest. In fact, I’d almost say it is a focus; I’m often as interested in that as I am in architecture. Ultimately, I came to understand pretty early that I did not have a natural propensity for the larger geophysics requirements and I really missed what architecture is: the intersection between the rational and the poetic. I was just in the rational world of physics and I missed the poetic. Architecture lets me have both.

After working for other firms around the world, Kundig joined Olson Kundig Architects in 1986. He first came to national attention with Studio House, a private residence that he completed in 1998. In 2002, he completed Chicken Point Cabin, a private residence that remains one of his most "iconic and poetic" designs that includes one of his most recognized gizmos: a 20-foot by 30-foot window-wall that opens with a hand crank.

Kundig regularly serves on design juries and lectures around the world on architecture and design. He has been a university studio critic throughout the United States and in Japan, including at Harvard University and the University of Oregon, and has served as the John G. Williams Distinguished Professor at the University of Arkansas School of Architecture and the D. Kenneth Sargent Visiting Design Critic at Syracuse University’s College of Architecture. Recent lectures include presentations at the Royal Academy of Arts in London and the New York Public Library. His award-winning work has been exhibited at the American Academy of Arts and Letters in New York City, Syracuse University, and at the National Building Museum in Washington, D.C. In the winter of 2010/2011, he was the sole North American architect chosen to represent the continent in an exhibit at TOTO GALLERY MA in Tokyo, Japan.

== Recognition and awards ==
Kundig is recipient of numerous awards and honors including the prestigious National Design Award in Architecture Design from the Smithsonian Cooper-Hewitt National Design Museum (2008). Kundig was elected to the American Academy of Arts and Letters in 2007. 14 projects by Kundig have been recognized by The American Institute of Architects National Awards, including the AIA Honor Awards for Art Stable (2013), Outpost (2010) and Delta Shelter (2008). The AIA has also awarded Kundig's project with AIA Northwest & Pacific Region Honor Award for The Rolling Huts (2009), Montecito Residence (2008) and Delta Shelter (2007). Other awards and distinctions include several American Architecture Awards from the Chicago Athenaeum for Outpost (2009), The Rolling Huts (2009), Montecito Residence (2008), Delta Shelter (2007) and Tye River Cabin (2007). Also, Kundig was named the Architectural League of New York's, Emerging Architect in 2004.

- AIA National Honor Awards, Architecture, Art Stable, 2013
- AIA National Honor Awards, Interior Architecture, Charles Smith Wines, 2013
- AIA Northwest & Pacific Region Honor Award, The Pierre, 2012
- Builder's Choice Design & Planning Awards, Builder's Choice Grand Award, The Pierre, 2012
- IIDA Northern Pacific Chapter INawards, People's Choice Award, Charles Smith Wines, 2012
- American Architecture Award, Chicago Athenaeum, Studio Sitges, 2012
- European Centre and Chicago Athenaeum International Architecture Award, Art Stable, 2012
- AIA National Housing Award, The Pierre, 2012
- AIA Northwest & Pacific Region Honor Award, Art Stable, 2011
- AIA National Housing Award, Art Stable, 2011
- AIA National Housing Award, 1111 E. Pike, 2011
- AIA National Honor Award, Outpost, 2010
- AIA National Housing Committee Award, Montecito Residence, 2009
- AIA National Housing Committee Award, Outpost, 2009
- AIA Northwest & Pacific Region Honor Award, The Rolling Huts, 2009
- American Architecture Award, Chicago Athenaeum, Outpost, 2009
- American Architecture Award, Chicago Athenaeum, The Rolling Huts, 2009
- National Design Award in Architecture Design, Smithsonian Cooper-Hewitt National Design Museum, 2008
- AIA National Honor Award, Delta Shelter, 2008
- American Architecture Award, Chicago Athenaeum, Montecito Residence, 2008
- AIA Northwest & Pacific Region Honor Award, Montecito Residence, 2008
- American Academy of Arts & Letters, Academy Award in Architecture, 2007
- AIA National Housing Committee Award, Delta Shelter, 2007
- AIA National Housing Committee Award, Tye River Cabin, 2007
- AIA Northwest & Pacific Region Honor Award, Delta Shelter, 2007
- American Architecture Award, Chicago Athenaeum, Delta Shelter, 2007
- American Architecture Award, Chicago Athenaeum, Tye River Cabin, 2007
- AIA National Honor Award, Chicken Point Cabin, 2004
- AIA National Honor Award, The Brain, 2004
- American Architecture Award, Chicago Athenaeum, Chicken Point Cabin, 2004
- Architectural League of New York, Emerging Architect: Tom Kundig, 2004
- AIA Northwest & Pacific Region Design Honor Award, Chicken Point Cabin, 2003

== Product design ==
In 2012, Olson Kundig Architects launched a steel accessories line, The Tom Kundig Collection, comprising over 25 hardware pieces that celebrate the kinetic moments that occur in buildings. The Tom Kundig Collection includes cabinet pulls, rollers, door knockers and knobs. Kundig collaborated with Seattle-based fabricator 12th Avenue Iron to manufacture the line.

The architect explains in an interview in Dwell magazine, that the “simplest-looking pieces” (the Peel, Ear and Droop Ear cabinet pulls) are also the most rewarding—“they represent the collection at its most elemental.” He calls the higher-priced Roll and Disc rollers a “wink and a nod” to their complex fabrication. Their edited forms are, as Kundig says, “honest about how they are made and what they are made from.”

According to Kundig, this line is the very first of many; now that he has begun to focus in this direction, he wants to keep going. “There are so many other products that I can’t find in the commodity market. Designing them myself and putting them out there for others to use seems like the right evolution.” The Tom Kundig Collection won a 2012 “Best of Year” award in the hardware category from Interior Design Magazine.

In 2013, Kundig designed The Final Turn, a funerary urn, with Greg Lundgren, owner of Lundgren Monuments in Seattle. The urn consists of two halves of an eight- inch-diameter blackened steel or bronze sphere—the halves are threaded with a noticeable offset from one another when they meet. While the sphere implies perfection and eternity, the offset nature of the urn is inspired by the people left behind - those whose lives are thrown off-kilter by the passing of a loved one. “It’s a quiet reminder.” Kundig noted in a New York Times interview. A threaded cap atop the stem on the lower half provides access to the receptacle for the remains. The upper half includes a compartment designed to house mementos. Flat surfaces on the exterior accommodate inscriptions, if desired.

== Films and videos ==
- Shadowboxx, 2012 – Three minute stop-motion film captures the ever-changing natural conditions of a place and the ability of a house to morph and respond to those changes over the course of a day.
- The Art Of: Tom Kundig Collection by 12th Avenue Iron, 2012 – Created and produced by Kontent Partners, The Art Of series celebrates the craft, passion, and people who make desired and sought-after objects of design. This short format vignette focuses on the Tom Kundig hardware line created and produced in partnership between 12th Avenue Iron and Olson Kundig Architects.
- An Interview with Jim Olson and Tom Kundig, 2012 – Created for the 28th Annual Interior Design Magazine Hall of Fame Award, this video introduces the work of Jim Olson and Tom Kundig. Video produced by C & M City Inc.
- Between Light and Shadow, 2011 – Discussion between Tom Kundig, Carol Bobo and Amber Murray about two houses that Kundig created for Bobo: Studio House in Shoreline, Seattle, and Shadowboxx in Lopez Island.
- Art Stable Time Lapse, 2011 – Art Stable is an urban infill project in the rapidly developing South Lake Union neighborhood of Seattle. Built on the site of a former horse stable, the seven-story mixed-use building carries its working history into the future with highly adaptable live/work units.
- Tom Kundig: Prototypes and Moving Parts, 2010 – A collection of projects by Tom Kundig.
- Moving Mazama, 2013 - Short by Katie Turinski depicting the differing viewpoints behind the Flagg Mountain controversy.

== Flagg Mountain hut legal dispute ==
In 2012, Tom Kundig and Jim Dow built a cabin on top of Flagg Mountain in Mazama, Washington, that has been opposed by a coalition including a number of area residents and adjoining property owners, who claim that the building, which is cantilevered over a rock cliff, is visually obtrusive and breaks an unwritten agreement among residents not to build atop the ridgeline. Those opponents have filed a lawsuit claiming that the structure violates protective viewshed covenants that were placed on the property by earlier owners. The cabin's owners (including Kundig and Dow) assert that the cabin's location is legal, that it is not as visible as opponents claim, that placement elsewhere would have intruded on other neighbors, and that once its exterior siding is completed, it will blend in more with its surroundings. The case is being heard in Superior Court of Okanogan County, Washington.

== Notable works ==
- Vergelegen, Berkshire Residence, The Berkshires, Massachusetts, 2015
- Sawmill, Tehachapi, California, 2014
- Studhorse, Winthrop, Washington, 2012
- Charles Smith Wines Tasting Room and World Headquarters, Walla Walla, Washington, 2011
- The Pierre, San Juan Islands, Washington, 2010
- Art Stable, Seattle, Washington, 2010
- Slaughterhouse Beach House, Maui, Hawaii, 2010
- Studio Sitges, Sitges, Spain, 2010
- Shadowboxx, San Juan Islands, Washington, 2010
- Outpost, Central Idaho, 2007
- Montecito Residence, Montecito, California, 2007
- Rolling Huts, Mazama, Washington, 2007
- Delta Shelter, Mazama, Washington, 2005
- Chicken Point Cabin, Northern Idaho, 2002
- The Brain, Seattle, Washington, 2001
- Ridge House, Eastern Washington, 2001
- Mission Hill Winery, Westbank, British Columbia, 2000
- Studio House, Seattle, Washington, 1998

== Publications ==
- Tom Kundig: Working Title, Princeton Architectural Press, 2020. (ISBN 1616898992)
- Tom Kundig: Works, Princeton Architectural Press, 2015. (ISBN 9781616893453)
- Tom Kundig: Houses 2. Princeton Architectural Press, 2011.
- Ngo, Dung. Tom Kundig: Houses. Princeton Architectural Press, 2006.
- Ojeda, Oscar Riera, ed. Olson Sundberg Kundig Allen Architects: Architecture, Art, and Craft. The Monacelli Press, 2001.

== External references ==
- Olson Kundig Architects website
- Cooper Hewitt National Design Awards
- E-Architect listing for Tom Kundig
- 2008 AIA Honor Awards Press Release
- Architectural Digest, AD 100
