= George Poe =

American chemist (1846-1914)

George Poe, Jr.
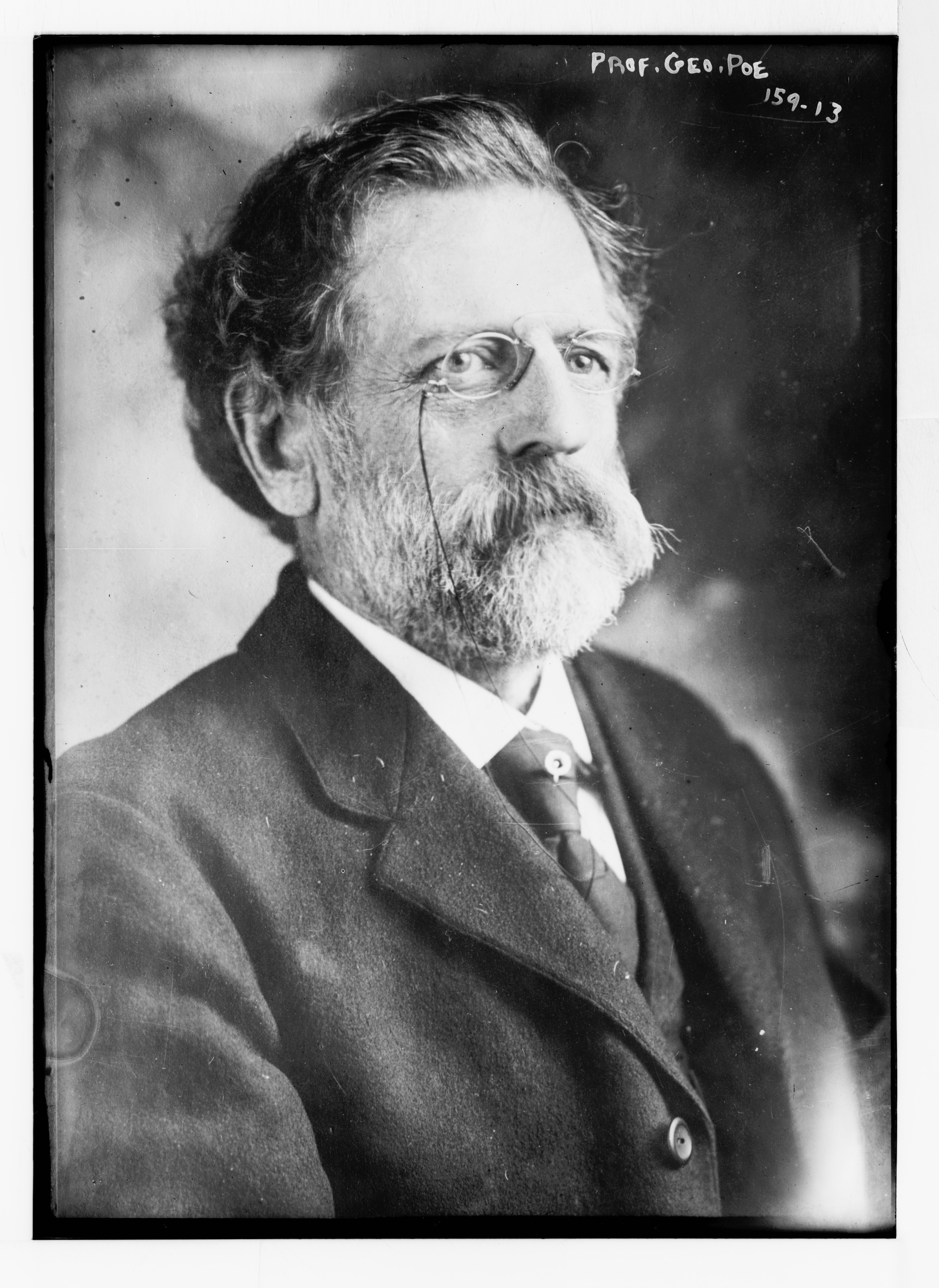
- Poe and Arthur Ostrander, 1907
- Born: May 8, 1846; Elkridge Landing, Maryland, US
- Died: February 3, 1914 (aged 67); Norfolk, Virginia, US
- Relatives: Edgar Allan Poe, cousin

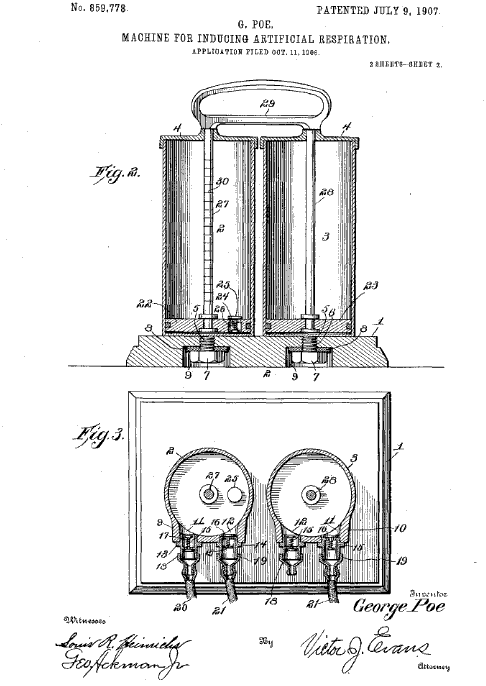
Patent for artificial respiration

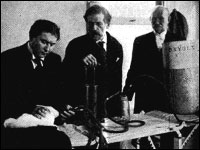
Dr. J.P. Jackson (left), George Poe (center) and Dr. Francis Morgan (right), 1907

George Poe Jr. (May 8, 1846 – February 3, 1914) was a pioneer of mechanical ventilation of asphyxiation victims. He was the first person to manufacture nitrous oxide for commercial use.

== Birth ==
He was the son of George Poe Sr. and Elizabeth Ross Ellicott, who married on December 14, 1835. Around 1885 he married Margaret Amy Wallace and they had the following children: George Poe III; Mary Elizabeth Ellicott Poe; Vylla Poe Wilson; and Elisabeth Ellicott Poe. He was a cousin of Edgar Allan Poe.

== Education and career ==
He attended the Virginia Military Institute, and after fighting in the American Civil War, Poe built the Poe Chemical Works in Trenton, New Jersey, which included the first plant in America for mass-producing liquid nitrous oxide. He chose Trenton because of its gas works which created the raw materials for creating nitrous oxide. By 1883 he was supplying about 5000 dentists with laughing gas.

Using the resources of his factory, Poe experimented with oxygen cylinders and tubing and found that he could resuscitate rats and rabbits that he had suffocated. In 1889, he undertook a nationwide tour. He claimed that his apparatus could revive humans who had drowned or been poisoned by gas lamps, and should be available in all hotels and lodging houses to deal with gas poisoning.

== Illness ==
Illness curtailed his activities. By 1900, he was nearly blind and partly paralyzed, and his doctors advised him to relocate to the country and retire. He moved to the Norfolk, Virginia, farm of a friend, Abram Cline Ostrander. He found that he could continue his research by enlisting the help of Arthur Frederick Ostrander, the article states: "Not the least interesting feature of Prof. Poe's device is the fact that a mere 10-year-old lad, Arthur Ostrander, acted as eyes and hands for the almost sightless and semi-paralyzed scientist in the construction of the device", the young son of his friend. Arthur Ostrander acted as Poe's eyes and hands, allowing him to further refine his device. In 1907 he began another tour, accompanied by Arthur Ostrander, and two Norfolk physicians, Dr. Francis Morgan and Dr. J. P. Jackson. He gained fresh publicity in 1909 when a man called Moses Goodman was revived using his apparatus. Again, his health prevented him from doing much, and other inventors developed their own artificial respirators.

== Death ==
He died on February 3, 1914, in Norfolk, Virginia. An obituary said that he had been nominated for a Nobel Prize. He was buried in Confederate Square, a Civil War memorial situated within Magnolia Cemetery, in Norfolk.

== Patents ==
- U.S. patent 859,778 Artificial Respiration (1907)
- U.S. patent 978,641 Gas Generator I (1909)
- U.S. patent 929,875 Gas Generator II (1909)
- U.S. patent 859,778 Safety Breathing Armor (1911)
