= Michael Londra =

Irish singer and theatrical producer (born 1965)

Michael Londra (born 13 April 1965) is an Irish singer, TV host and theatrical producer.

== Biography ==
Londra is the producer & host of Ireland with Michael on PBS Network.

He was the lead singer in Riverdance in the US National Tour where he performed at Radio City Music Hall in New York City and the MGM Grand Las Vegas. In 2000 and 2001, Michael was the lead singer in Riverdance on Broadway. He also performed in Broadway on Broadway, which was televised at Times Square. He sang with Heather Headley in First You Dream: A Tribute To Christopher Reeve in the New Amsterdam Theater on Broadway.

Londra is the creator and director of Radiocelt, a Celtic internet music station, which is part of the Accuradio network.

He released an album entitled Celt, which includes several of his own compositions. His singing is the background sound of the "Look Around Ireland" DVD.

Londra was the lead singer in The Passion of the Christ Symphony based on the score of the movie directed by Mel Gibson. The score was written by Oscar nominee John Debney.

As ambassador for Concern Worldwide in the US, he released a charity single on their behalf to raise funds and to bring attention to their fight against poverty.

He co-produced his own TV special, "Beyond Celtic" with Mindfox Productions, for PBS television in 2011, earning 2 Emmy nominations.

In June 2013, he was invited to perform in Arlington, Virginia at the graveside of President John F. Kennedy as part of the JFK 50 celebrations. He also performed in New Ross for visiting guests including Caroline Kennedy and many members of the Kennedy family. He performed Amazing Grace with Judy Collins

He was made Wexford Ambassador in 2012 along with Eoin Colfer, Colm Toibin and Dermot O'Leary.

In 2015 he partnered with Steve Peters of Venuworks, to form a theatrical production company. Their first venture, NOËL, is a musical written by Eoin Colfer and Liam Bates debuted at the National Opera House, Ireland in December 2016.

He hosts Ireland with Michael on public television.

== Discography ==
- Riverdance on Broadway
- Celt
- Concern single
- Beyond the Star
- The Road Not Taken
- Beyond Celtic

Photography for all projects was shot by Dominic Arizona Bonuccelli.

== Filmography ==
- Look Around Ireland DVD
- Beyond Celtic DVD
