= Arthur Frederick Ostrander =

Arthur Frederick Ostrander, Sr.
- Arthur Ostrander and grandson Greg Ostrander, 1964
- Born: February 14, 1895; Schodack, New York
- Died: February , 1978; Chesapeake, Virginia
- Children: Cline Brooks Ostrander; Arthur Frederick Ostrander, Jr.
- Parent(s): Abram Cline Ostrander; Harriet Louise Ostrander

Arthur Frederick Ostrander, Sr. (February 14, 1895 – February 1978), was an assistant scientist. He worked with inventor George Poe. In his childhood he worked with Poe (mid-1907 to 1908), who taught him how an artificial respiration device functions. His assistance to Poe was instrumental in the successful development of the respiration device, as he performed the fine detail work and metal fabrication that Poe could no longer do. His face came to be one of the most well known of the time, having been featured in several large circulation newspapers.

== Biography ==
Arthur was the youngest child of Abram Cline (September 12, 1843 – October 2, 1914) and Harriet Louise Ostrander (April 15, 1856 – November 6, 1947). He was descended from The 1679 marriage of Pieter & Rebecca in Kingston, Ulster County, NY. A son, Theunis, born 1691 in Kingston, was ancestor to both Abram Cline Ostrander and Harriet Louise Ostrander. The name "Ostrander" was coined in New York after 1701. Dutch settlers who migrated to the town of New Amsterdam (present day New York City) in the 1660s. He had five siblings: Louis Sherley Ostrander, George Francis Ostrander, Cornelia Elizabeth "Nina" Ostrander Dudley, Faith Wilbur Ostrander Allen Gatling, and Helen Louise Ostrander Smith.

=== Early life ===
Arthur was born in the town of Schodack, Rensselaer County, New York, on his family's farm (named "Brookview Farmstead"), which was in the process of being subdivided after the death of his grandfather, Walter Ostrander (September 12, 1806 – September 17, 1880). In the late 1890s his father moved the family south to Norfolk County, Virginia, and bought a large tract of land, using contacts gained from his wife's Virginia branch of the family. Arthur was raised to be a farmer, like his father before him. He attended public schools along with his siblings, and worked hard at excelling in the technological fields of study, and labored on the farm during term breaks.

From an early age, he exhibited an interest in science and an aptitude for mechanics. When his family boarded George Poe for several years, he began to assist the inventor with his work. Poe, by then nearly blind and paralytic, soon discovered the boy had both the technical skills and dexterity to perform fine metal work, and could act as his veritable hands and eyes on tasks of minute detail. Poe approached the Ostrander family with a proposition; if Arthur would assist him full-time, he and his two assistants, (J. P. Jackson, M.D., and Francis Morgan, M.D.) would privately tutor Arthur through high school. The family consented, and he exited the schooling system to become a full-time member of the artificial respiration device team at age ten.

He worked with Poe, Jackson, and Morgan for the next several years, and toured with them when they demonstrated the artificial respirator in 1907. In doing so he received a rigorous education in science, in addition to classes in Classical Studies and the arts provided quid pro quo by his tutors. He shared in the patent granted to Poe for the device, on July 9, 1907, but his mother had to be listed as having the share of the credit due to his very young age. Even though the device was well received, Poe's health continued to decline, and the device was never successfully marketed. When Poe died in 1914, Arthur had already made plans to enter Apprentice School at the Norfolk Naval Shipyard. He completed training and became a skilled machinist, and later a supervisor.

=== Later years ===
Arthur married Annie Caribel Campen in 1919, and they had two children, Cline Brooks Ostrander and Arthur Frederick Ostrander, Jr. He lived his life in the Norfolk and Chesapeake, Virginia areas, and after a successful career with the shipyard, retired to his home in Chesapeake, dividing his leisure time amongst fishing, hunting and spending time with his family. He owned land in the so-called "outer banks" of North Carolina, and often vacationed there in his cottage. He died suddenly in February 1978, and was interred in Chesapeake Memorial Gardens beside his wife, who predeceased him in 1971. He was survived by his two sons, four grandchildren, and two great-grandchildren.

=== Faith ===
Arthur was raised an Episcopalian, but later joined the Chesapeake Avenue United Methodist Church, Chesapeake, Virginia where his wife was a member. He was a Master Mason and long-term member of the South Norfolk Masonic Lodge of Chesapeake, Virginia.
