= Sarah Minnick =

American chef

- Born: Spokane, Washington, U.S.
- Education: Rhode Island School of Design
- Occupation: Chef

Sarah Minnick is a chef in Portland, Oregon, where she has operated the restaurants Lovely Hula Hands and Lovely's Fifty Fifty.

== Early life and education ==
Sarah Minnick was born in Spokane, Washington and her family moved to Portland when she was four or five. She recalls seeing her father going off to work every day in a suit and tie and knowing she did not want that.

Sarah attended the Rhode Island School of Design and majored in Fine Arts, graduating with a degree in Painting. She was offered a work-study job while in school, the only one that interested her was working in the on campus student cafe. She found the job offered a lot of freedom and was enthusiastic about it. A friend pointed out that she seemed to enjoy running the cafe better than she liked painting; she recalls thinking "Uh-oh, busted." She felt at the time that there was "a stigma around working in kitchens, that it was frowned on as a career". She describes being "torn" after graduation because of the money her family had spent on her education. She also studied fashion design.

== Career ==
Sarah Minnick worked for Adidas as a patternmaker. She describes her supervisor telling her in her first review that she was doing a good job and that she could probably be a team leader in ten years, and she realized she wasn't going to enjoy doing the job. It was at that time she says that she began to "plot opening a restaurant".

=== Restaurant industry ===
==== Lovely Hula Hands ====
In 2003 Minnick purchased a derelict house and turned it into a fine dining restaurant named Lovely Hula Hands. She and her sister ran front-of-house and her boyfriend cooked. Minnick kept her job with Adidas and opened the restaurant in the evenings; after a couple of years she was able to quit the Adidas job. Her boyfriend quit the job, and Minnick found Troy McClarty, who had worked with foragers and farmers at Chez Panisse, to take over. McClarty changed the restaurant's menu to a seasonal focus, which was something Minnick was not familiar with. The restaurant evolved into a special-occasion place, which Minnick did not want, preferring instead something more casual that customers would visit regularly rather than only on special occasions.

She started thinking about an ice cream shop, which she did not think Portland had, but wanted another specialty for winter months and decided on pizza; they started work on the new restaurant. While doing the work the recession hit and she closed Hula Hands to focus on the new restaurant.

==== Lovely Fifty Fifty ====
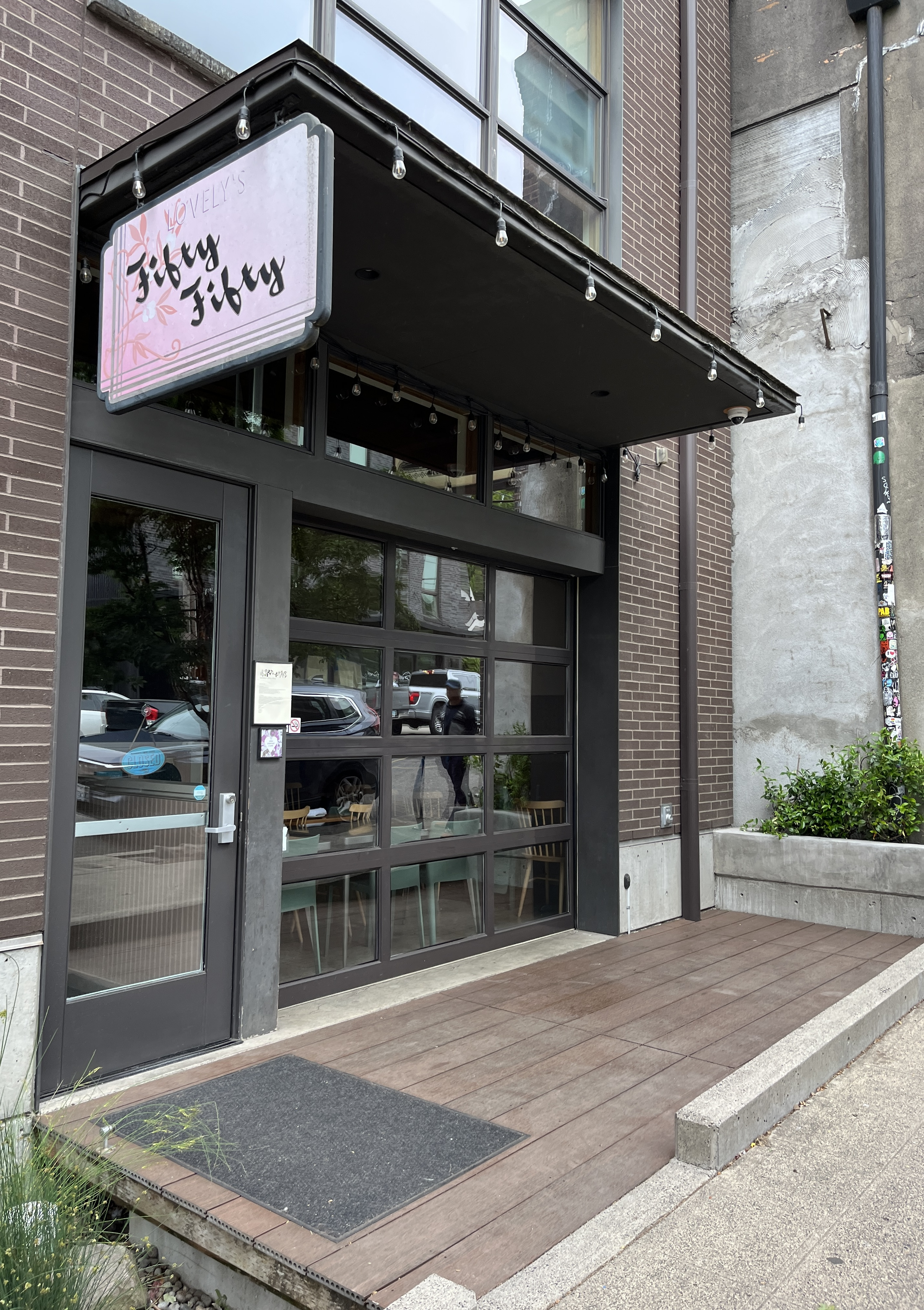
Lovely's Fifty Fifty

Two weeks after closing Hula Hands, Lovely's Fifty Fifty opened as a pizzeria and ice cream shop, with Minnick in the kitchen. She had not made pizza dough before; she worked on bread dough to develop dough skills. She developed relationships with local farmers. Portland Monthly's Karen Brooks came in one night and recalls, "There's barely any sauce. There's a minimum of cheese. There are flavors you do not associate with pizza. Sour, floral, spice, and funk. It was enchanting." She wrote a rave review, and the restaurant's customer base greatly increased. Brooks credits Minnick's restaurant with bringing Portland-style pizza to greater attention. The pizza and ice cream restaurant uses foraged ingredients, many of which Minnick calls "weird weeds", such as purslane, along with edible flowers, local artisinal cheeses, and little-used vegetables.

At Lovely's Fifty Fifty, Minnick serves seven pizza options, including four seasonal pies nightly. She bases the day's pizza offerings on what she has foraged, found at the farmers' markets, or received from local farmers. She sometimes encounters an unfamiliar ingredient and has to "go through an entire nights of making that pizza to adjust". She also prefers creating pizzas without tomato sauce.

Her ice cream ingredients are also nontraditional, such as an infusion of roasted fig leaves. Other ice cream flavors that shes known for include Malted Milk Ball, Mint Stracciatella, Buckwheat honey Toffee, Anise Hyssop Stracciatella, and Vanilla bean bourbon, all using organic and local ingredients.

Portland Monthly's Karen Brooks said that "what matters [in Portland] is having something to say, and Sarah Minnick has a lot to say". She called Minnick's pizza and ice cream some of the best in the city and that Minnick had "changed what pizza can be". Lane Selman of Culinary Breeding Network said Minnick "really shines" with her vegetable-forward pizzas. Minnick is known for "going beyond" the farmers' markets to do experimental things.

Minnick described to Chef's Table: Pizza starting the restaurant on a shoestring. Minnick's sister, daughter, and mother also work at the restaurant. In 2020, Minnick was a semifinalist in the James Beard Foundation Award's Best Chef: Northwest & Pacific category.

== Personal life ==
Minnick has a son and daughter.

== See also ==
- List of chefs
- List of people from Portland, Oregon
- List of Rhode Island School of Design people
