= Mission Hill Family Estate =

Wine grower in West Kelowna, Canada

Coordinates: 49.835612°N 119.587684°W

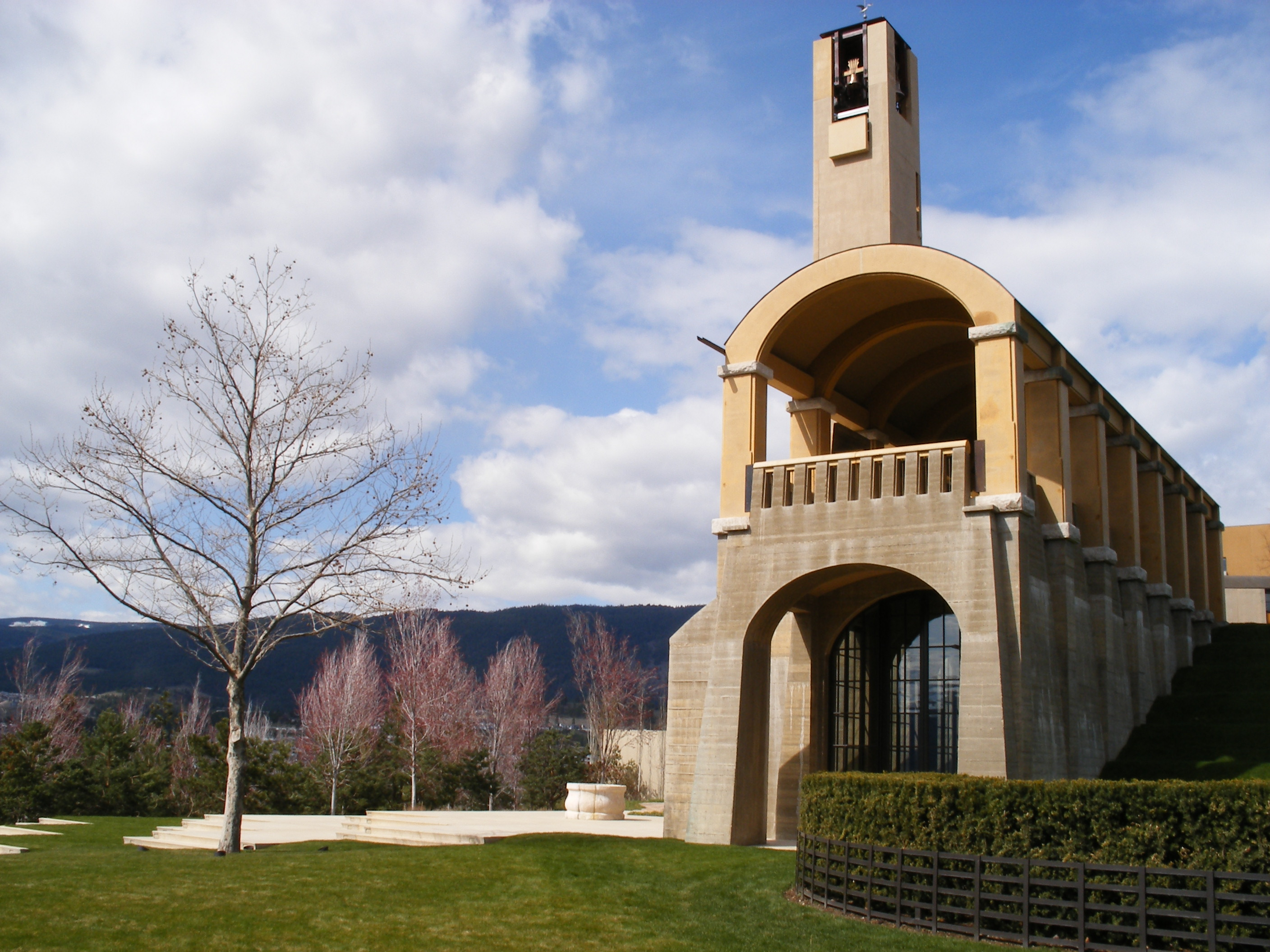
- Location: West Kelowna, British Columbia, Canada
- Appellation: Okanagan Valley
- Other labels: Legacy Collection, Terroir Collection, Reserve
- Founded: 1966
- Key people: Anthony von Mandl, O.C., O.B.C. (Proprietor), Taylor Whelan (Winemaker)
- Known for: Oculus
- Varietals: Cabernet Franc, Cabernet Sauvignon, Chardonnay, Merlot, Petit Verdot, Pinot Blanc, Pinot Gris, Pinot Noir, Riesling, Sauvignon Blanc, Shiraz, Vidal, Viognier
- Website: www.missionhillwinery.com

Mission Hill Family Estate is a wine grower and producer based in West Kelowna, British Columbia, Canada, in the Okanagan Valley wine region. The winery is situated atop Mission Hill overlooking a 145 kilometre lake, mountains and vineyards.

== History ==
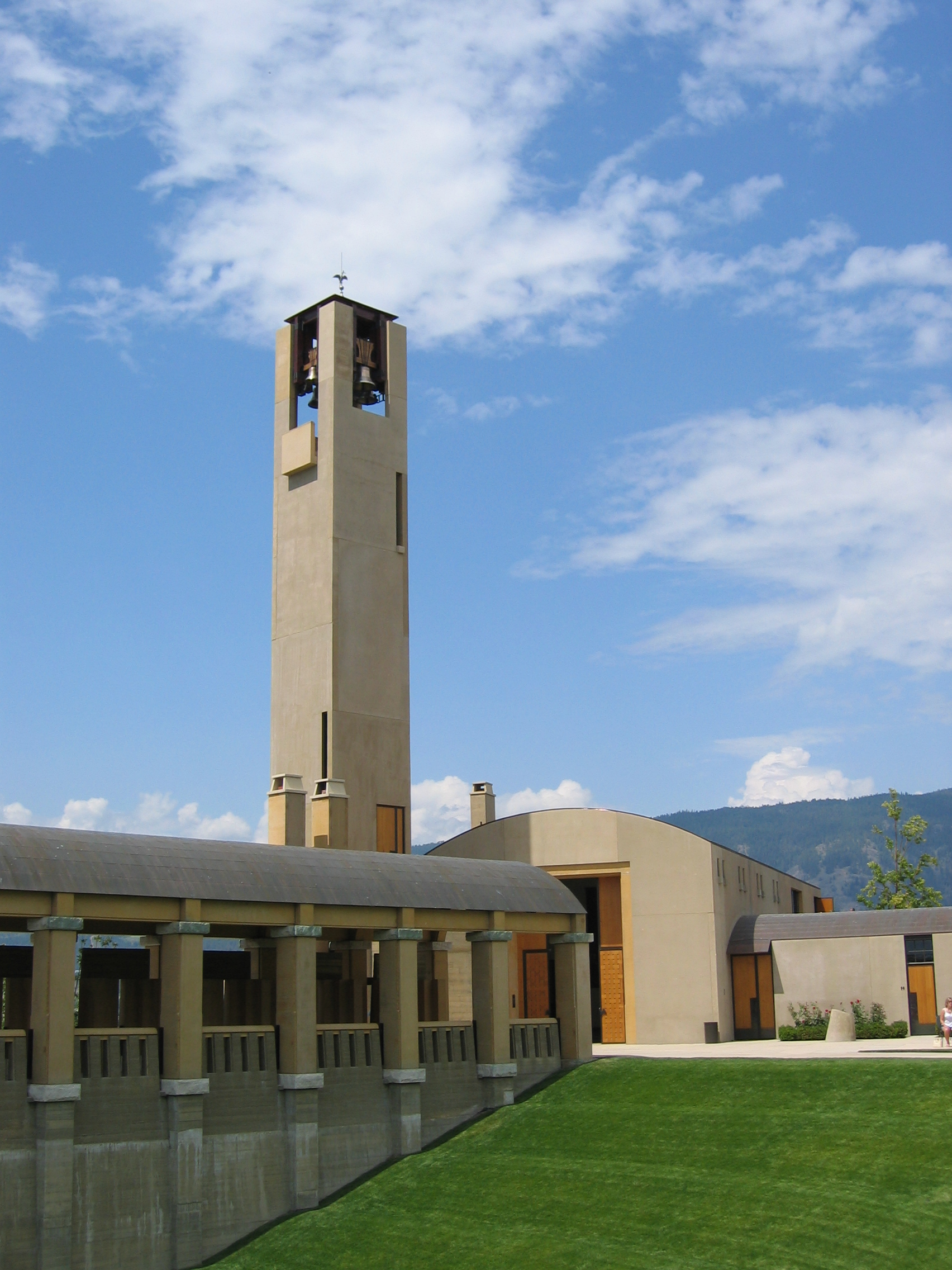
Mission Hill Winery buildings and bell tower

Mission Hill Winery was established in 1966; years later, Anthony von Mandl would create the Mission Hill Family designation.

von Mandl was a wine seller in Vancouver during the 1970s and assisted in preparing a feasibility study regarding growing grapes in the area for Josef Milz, a Mosel based winery. While the German vintner did not go ahead with a purchase, von Mandl decided that the area was worth investing in, and in 1981 purchased the abandoned Mission Hill estate. von Mandl is also the founder of Mike's Hard Lemonade Co.

The first Chardonnay made by John Simes, who had just joined the winery, in the 1992 vintage won the trophy for "Best Chardonnay" at the 1994 International Wine and Spirit Competition, becoming the first Okanagan winery to receive overseas recognition.

Olson Kundig Architects were commissioned in 1996 to rebuild the winery and associated buildings. This was the first winery project undertaken by the design firm. The work was completed in 2002 at an estimated cost of thirty-five million Canadian dollars. The centrepiece and focal point of the design was a twelve-story and 85 foot high bell tower, with four bells cast by Fonderie Paccard in Annecy, France who also crafted the bells for St. Patrick's Cathedral in New York and Sacré-Cœur in Paris. The largest bell weighs nearly 800 kilograms.

== Vineyards ==
Until 1996, Mission Hill had purchased grapes from vineyards owned by others to produce wine, with no vineyard holdings of its own. It started to purchase its own vineyards in 1996. Mission Hill Family Estate farms 32 family-owned estate vineyards in the Okanagan Valley. Mission Hill has estate vineyards in each of the five growing regions; West Kelowna, East Kelowna, Naramata Bench, Black Sage Bench in Southeast Oliver and Osoyoos. Most of the vineyards are planted on benches above the valley floor; on varying degrees of slope that assist with air drainage, improve frost protection and increase the amount of sun the vines receive.

== Wines and winemaking ==
Michel Rolland, a prominent French oenologist, was a consultant at the estate for some vintages. 5.

Mission Hill estate produces wines across four tiers. Their entry level wines are the "Reserve" wines, followed by the "Terroir Collection" and the top-tier "Legacy" series.

The flagship "Oculus" is a Bordeaux style red wine made from Merlot, Cabernet Sauvignon, Cabernet Franc and Petit Verdot. It is named after circular windows used in classical architecture.

== Other ==
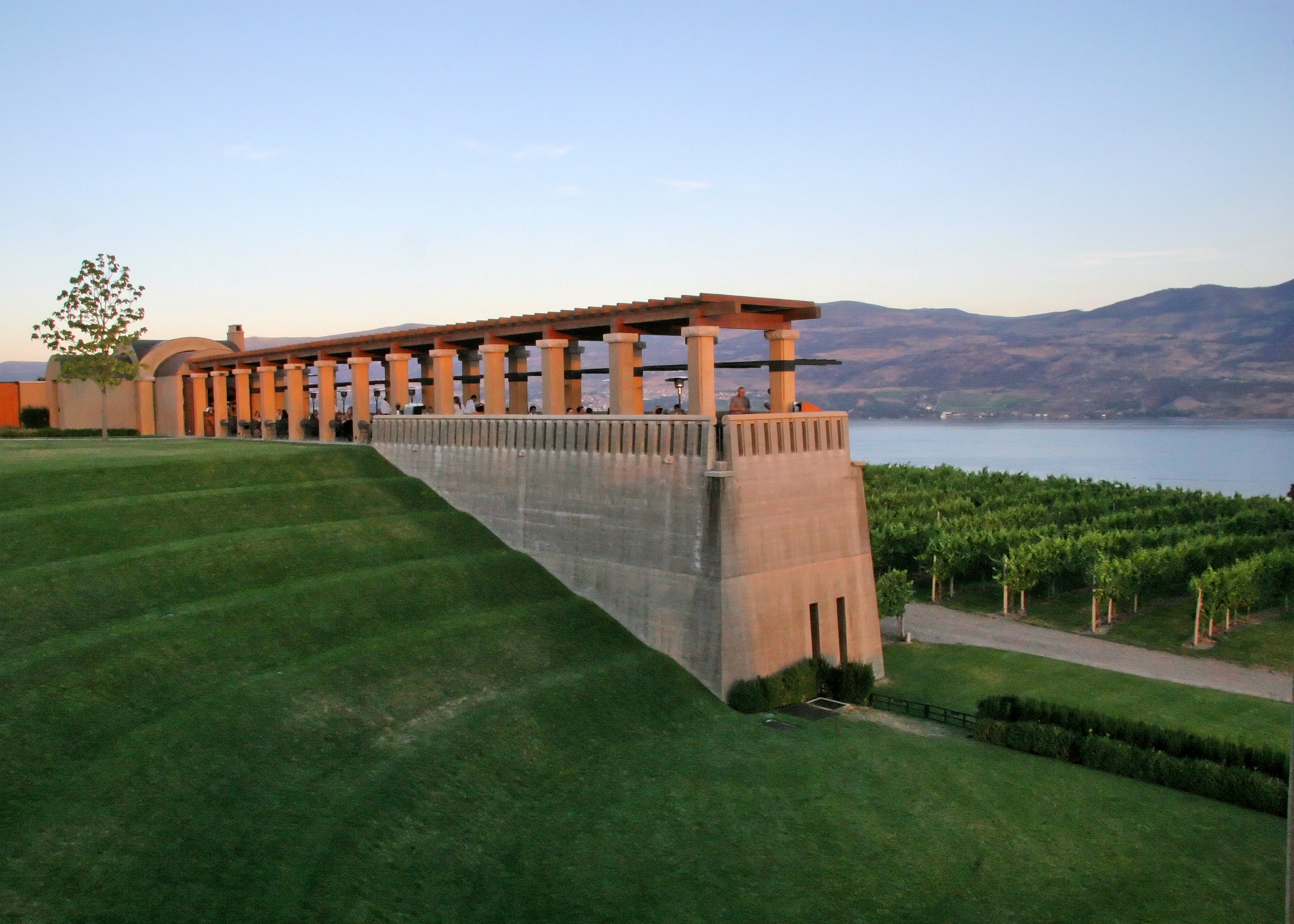
Terrace restaurant overlooking Lake Okanagan

The estate has a sixty-seat restaurant called "Terrace" that opened in 2002. It overlooks Lake Okanagan. In 2008 it was named by Travel + Leisure magazine as one of the five best winery restaurants in the world.
