= Maude McClaine =

American aviator (1894–1980)

- Born: 1894; Saint Paul, Minnesota
- Died: 1980 March; Spokane, Washington
- Known for: Early aviator
- Spouse(s): Adolphus Fielding McClaine, Jr.

Maude McClaine (1894–1980) was an early female aviator from the Pacific Northwest and the first woman in Spokane, Washington to hold a pilot license.

== Personal life ==
Maude Josephine (Bateham) McClaine was born on April 23, 1894, in Saint Paul, Minnesota. Her father was Anson P. Bateham, who worked in the oil industry. At some point, her family relocated to Chicago, Illinois. In 1915, she married Adolphus Fielding McClaine Jr. (-1926) and they settled in Spokane, Washington. She was also a member of the Junior League of Spokane, a member of the Spokane Press Club, and a well-regarded figure skater.

== Aviation ==
McClaine became interested in aviation when she met aviator Frank Hawks in the late 1920s. In 1929, she attended Nick Mamer's Flying School at Felts Field. After just 11 hours of instruction, McClaine soloed and became Spokane's first woman pilot. In 1930, she earned a limited commercial license, one of just twenty-five women in the United States to hold that license at the time.

== Death ==
Maude McClaine died in March 1980.
