= Quail Hawkins =

American writer (1905–2002)

- Born: Helena Ann Hawkins; March 29, 1905; Spokane, Washington, U.S.
- Died: August 16, 2002 (aged 97); Pacific Grove, California, U.S.
- Education: University of California, Berkeley
- Occupations: Bookseller; writer
- Writing career
- Genre: Children's literature

Quail Hawkins (born Helena Ann Hawkins) was born on March 29, 1905, in Spokane, Washington. She was an American bookseller and writer of children's literature. She died on August 16, 2002, in Pacific Grove, California.

== Biography ==
Hawkins was the oldest of seven children. Her father was a fruit wholesaler and her mother a columnist for a local newspaper, The Spokane Register. Hawkins attended the University of California, Berkeley in 1927, but did not complete a degree. She became a bookseller during the 1920s, ending up at Sather Gate Bookshop in 1931. Sather Gate is a supplier of books for schools and libraries. She worked there until 1972. She also worked for Publishers Weekly and the University of California Press. She contributed to the 1963 Encyclopædia Britannica children's literature. According to a memoir, Hawkins once hired author Beverly Cleary to work at Sather Gate Bookshop for the holiday rush.

== Works ==
At the time of her death, none of her books remained in print.

- Quetzal Quest: The Story of the Capture of the Quetzal, the Sacred Bird of the Aztecs and the Mayas, with V. W. von Hagen, Harcourt, 1939.
- The Treasure of the Tortoise Islands, with V. W. von Hagen, Harcourt, 1940.
- Prayers and Graces for Little Children, Grosset, 1941, revised edition published as A Little Book of Prayers and Graces, Doubleday, 1952.
- Who Wants an Apple?, Holiday, 1942.
- A Puppy for Keeps, Holiday, 1943.
- Don't Run, Apple!, Holiday, 1944.
- Too Many Dogs, Holiday, 1946.
- Mark, Mark, Shut the Door, Holiday, 1947.
- The Best Birthday, Doubleday, 1954.
- Mountain Courage, Doubleday, 1957.
- The Aunt-Sitter, Holiday, 1958.
- Androcles and the Lion (retold), Coward, 1970.
- The Art of Bookselling: Quail Hawkins and the Sather Gate Book Shop: An Interview Conducted in 1978, Regional Oral History Office, with Marsha Maguire, Bancroft Library, University of California, 1979.
