= Harold Balazs =

American sculptor (1928–2017)

Harold Balazs (1928 – December 30, 2017) was an American sculptor and artist whose work has been featured in exhibits and public art installations throughout the Northwestern United States. He is known for creating large, abstract metal sculptures, but also created murals, jewelry, furniture, drawings, stained glass, and wooden boats.

== Life ==
Balazs lived in Mead, Washington and referred to the studio in his barn as Mead Art Works.

Balazs was born in 1928 and grew up in Westlake, Ohio during the Depression Era. He moved with his parents to Spokane, Washington.

His first collaboration for commissioned work was a mural at Ridpath Hotel in Spokane, produced with Patrick Flammia in 1951. He became a leading liturgical artist, with sculpture, painting, stained glass, and reliefs inside over 200 churches and synagogues in the Pacific Northwest, including a bas relief sculpture on the east facade of the First United Methodist Church in Eugene, Oregon.

Balazs served three terms as Washington State Arts Commissioner and helped draft that state's art legislation.

Balazs died on December 30, 2017, aged 89.

== Exhibits ==
In 2002, The Washington State History Museum presented "Stuff and Junk: The Story of a Bricoleur," an exhibit of sculptures by Harold Balazs. The Northwest Museum of Arts and Culture in Spokane mounted a career retrospective of Balazs' works in 2010. His work is also exhibited at The Art Spirit Gallery of Fine Art in Coeur d'Alene, Idaho where his work has been displayed for 16 years. In September 2013, the gallery hosted "Harold Balazs: Alive at 85 & Mel McCuddin: Lately 80". Balazs has also shown with Timothy C. Ely in "Illuminating the Subconscious" in 2010.

He was a featured artist at Tinman Gallery in Spokane.

== Public art ==
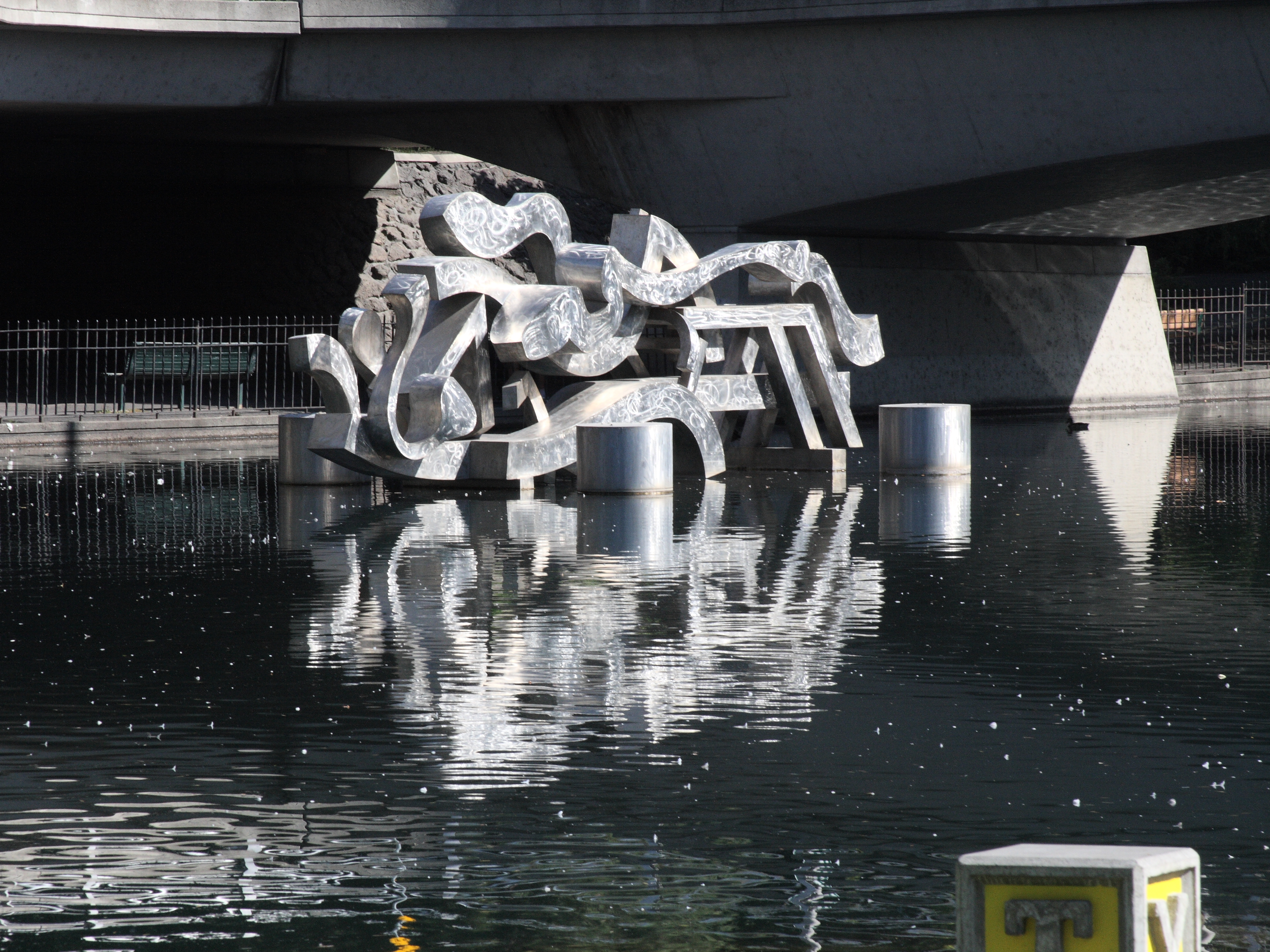
Centennial Sculpture, an aluminum sculpture that floats in the Spokane River

Balazs has contributed extensively to the downtown landscape of Spokane, with many of his works featured prominently in Riverfront Park. Sculptures include the Rotary Riverfront Fountain, Centennial Sculpture, and Untitled (a.k.a. '"Lantern"). Other works can be found throughout Spokane, including Wildflowers of the Northwest, a sculpture, Canoe at Lewis and Clark High School, and the facade of Hennessy Funeral Home.

In Idaho, several of Balazs' metal sculptures are installed on college campuses. Works installed at North Idaho College, include I Must Go Down to the Seas Again and Reflections. Works at the University of Idaho include the Hartung Theater Sculpture and Theophilus Tower Sculpture.

Other works include Seattle Project, located at the Henry M. Jackson Federal Building.

Several of his works have incorporated the phrase "Transcend the Bullshit". One sculpture that is untitled, but referred to as Lantern, has gained notoriety because one must climb to the top of the sculpture to view the hidden message. Climbing it, however, is illegal and potentially dangerous.

== Publications ==
"Harold Balazs and Friends", with a foreword by Tom Kundig, was published by the University of Washington Press in 2010.
