= Carla Turco =

Argentine TV personality and designer

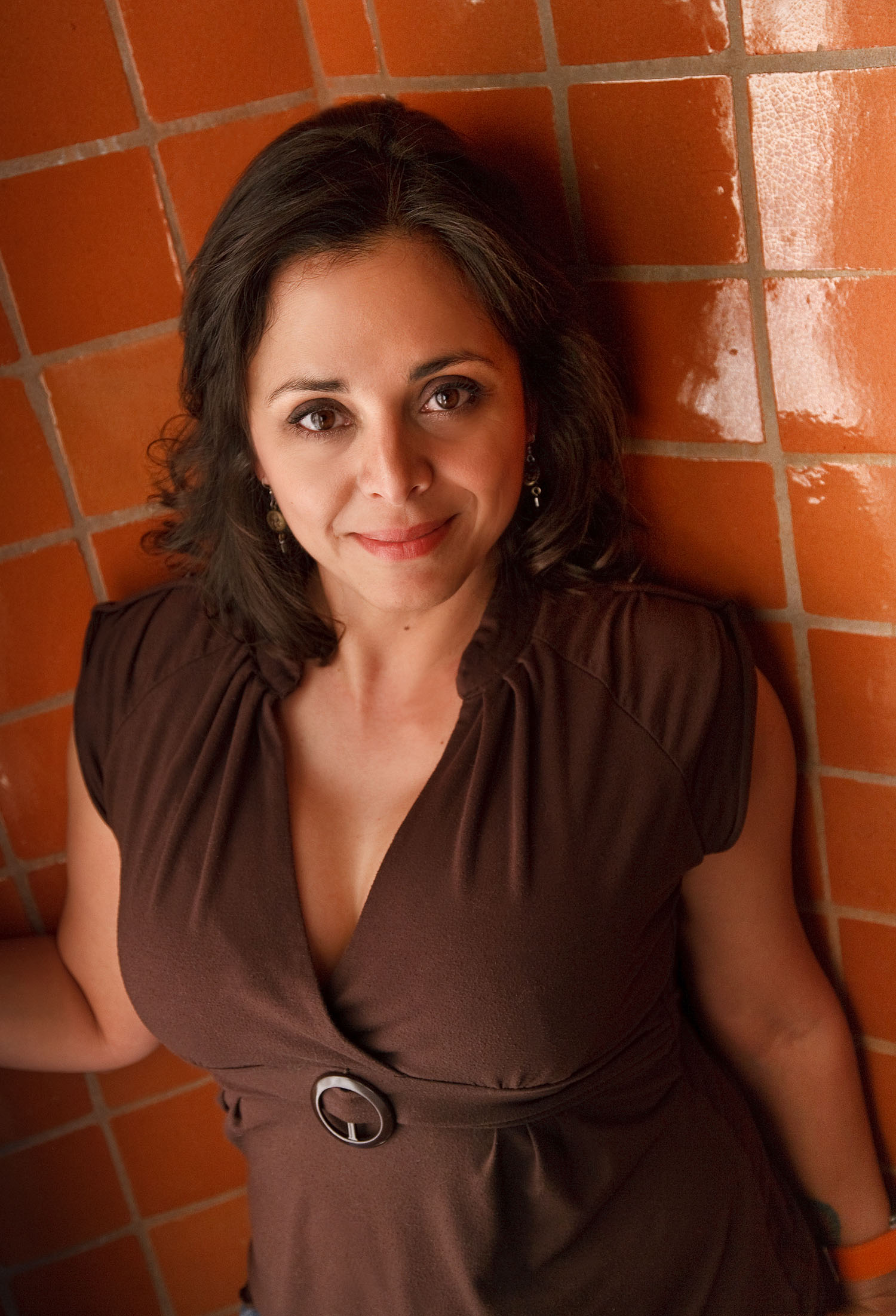
- Carla Turco
- Born: Bahía Blanca, Argentina
- Occupation: Designer / Activist / Television Personality

Carla Turco is an Argentine-American television personality, designer, and community advocate.

A native of Bahía Blanca, Argentina, Turco moved in adolescence to New Orleans, Louisiana, with her family in 1985. Since 2002, Carla has been based in Tucson, Arizona. She received a B.A. in Architecture from Louisiana State University, and is the principal and creator of the graphic design firm Nontextual Matters. She has recently worked on projects for the United States Postal Service, designing cachet and cancellation collateral for US stamps, including one dedicated to martyred Mexican-American journalist Rubén Salazar.

In 2004, Turco co-founded ELLA Group, a non-profit organization that offers classes in self-defense and empowerment to women and girls in the Tucson community. Through ELLA Group, Carla is a self-defense instructor at The University of Arizona, Girl Scouts of the USA, and a multitude of community groups in Arizona.

In 2008, Carla co-starred in the FOX television show When Women Rule the World, pitting chauvinistic male contestants against a matriarchal tropical island of ruling female elite. The show aired in Finland during the summer of 2009. Turco currently performs onstage for the Bilingual and Spanish versions of The Vagina Monologues.
