= David Shannon =

American writer and children's book illustrator

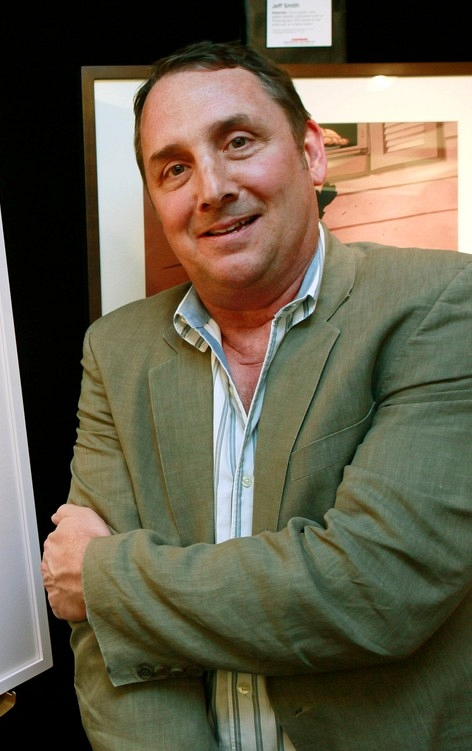
- Shannon in 2011, posing at an event in New York.
- Born: October 5, 1959 (age 67); Washington, D.C., U.S.
- Occupations: Illustrator, writer
- Writing career
- Period: 1989–present
- Genre: Children's picture books

David Shannon (born October 5, 1959) is an American writer and illustrator of children's books. Shannon grew up in Spokane, Washington. He graduated from the Art Center College of Design and now resides in Los Angeles. In 1998, he received the Caldecott Honor for his book No, David!. He has also written A Bad Case of Stripes, How Georgie Radbourn Saved Baseball, and The Amazing Christmas Extravaganza. Shannon illustrated Audrey Wood's The Bunyans, Rafe Martin's The Rough Face Girl, various books by Jane Yolen, including The Ballad of the Pirate Queens and Encounter, as well as Melinda Long's How I Became a Pirate and Pirates Don't Change Diapers.

== Early life ==
Shannon was born in Washington, D.C., but he also spent his childhood in Spokane, Washington. At the age of five, he wrote and illustrated his first book. On every page were pictures of David doing things he was not supposed to do. In an interview with Sonia Bolle in the Children's Literature Review (CLR), he said, "I loved Oliver Twist, but I liked the Artful Dodger more than Oliver. And I always thought the villains in Disney movies were really cool." Shannon said that this fondness for villains made him realize as a child that "you need both sides for a good story."

As a student in high school, he decided early on that he wanted to have a career in an art field. Shannon enjoyed making his own illustrations to books that he was reading in high school. Shannon attended art school at the Art Center College of Design in Pasadena, California, and decided to focus on learning about political illustrations. In 1983, Shannon moved to New York City and began working for various magazines and newspapers. Two of his major jobs were for the New York Times and the Book Review. These jobs brought Shannon's work increased exposure. His first book of illustrations was Julius Lester's How Many Spots Does a Leopard Have? (1989).

== Career ==
Shannon's first book was How Georgie Radbourn Saved Baseball (1994), where Shannon was able to incorporate his dark painting style, which came from his love of villains, with a story about baseball.

Shannon's book No, David! (1998) was named a Caldecott Honor Book in 1999. This book is the story of a mischievous child whose mother is always telling him 'no,' but she reassures him at the end when she finally says, "Yes, David, I love you." According to a review in the CLR, "Readers won't be able to resist taking a walk on the wild side with this little rascal, and may only secretly acknowledge how much of him they recognize in themselves."

Shannon followed No, David! (1998) up with David Goes to School (1999) and David Gets in Trouble (2002). The latter was reviewed by Adele Greenlee, who stated that, "Children who enjoyed No, David! (1998) and David Goes to School (1999) will welcome this lighthearted sequel."

== Style ==
An entry in the Eight Book of Junior Authors and Illustrators states, "Shannon tells his stories with vibrant, imaginative pictures. Working with acrylic paints, he creates characters and settings that both illustrate and expand the story being told. His artwork is richly colored, and the results can be funny, mischievous, ironic, sensational, spooky, serious, even epic." Shannon's work has been recognized by the American Library Association and the School Library Journal. As Dwight Garner said, "David Shannon is among this country's most respected children's book illustrators; in a field that has nearly as many award ceremonies each year as the television industry does, Shannon has taken home most of their prizes..."

In The Rain Came Down (2000), an unexpected summer shower causes great chaos in a small neighborhood. This huge shower causes a line of temper tantrums, but when the clouds suddenly break, all the sour moods go away. A review for CLR said, "Shannon expertly uses vertiginous angles as he builds suspense, then calms things down with a set of subdued portraits and a view of a quiet afternoon picnic."

== Awards ==
- How Georgie Radbourn Saved Baseball (1994) was on The New York Times list as one of the Ten Best Illustrated Books of 1994.
- No, David! (1998) was named as a Caldecott Honor Book, an ALA Notable Children's Book, a Bulletin of the Center for Children's Books Blue Ribbon title, a School Library Journal Best Book of the Year, and was on the New York Times Best Illustrated Book list
- The Rain Came Down (2001) was awarded the Golden Kite Award;
- How I Became a Pirate (2003) received the Booksense Best Picture Book.

== Personal life ==
Shannon lives in Los Angeles with his wife, Heidi, and his daughter, Emma (b. 1998). Shannon is working on the screenplay for Georgie Radbourn, a DreamWorks live-action film.

== Bibliography ==
publication date	title	series or notes	format
1994	How Georgie Radbourn Saved Baseball		
1994	The Ballad of the Pirate Queens	Jane Yolen	
1996	Encounter	Jane Yolen	
1996	The Bunyans	Audrey Wood	
1998	A Bad Case of Stripes		
1998	No, David!	David	hardcover
1998	The Acrobat and the Angel	Mark Shannon	
1999	David Goes To School	David	hardcover
2000	The Rain Came Down		
2002	David Gets in Trouble	David	hardcover
2002	Duck on a Bike	Duck on a...	
2002	Duck and a Book		
2002	The Rough-Face Girl	Rafe Martin	
2002	Robot Zot	Jon Scieszka	
2002	Amazing Christmas Extravaganza		
2003	How I Became a Pirate		
2004	Alice The Fairy		
2005	Oh, David!	Diaper David	board book
2005	David Smells!	Diaper David	board book
2005	Oops!	Diaper David	board book
2006	Good Boy, Fergus!		
2006	Why Did the Chicken Cross the Road?	Marla Frazee	
2007	Pirates Don't Change Diapers		
2008	Too Many Toys		
2008	Who's That Truck?	Jon Scieszka's Trucktown	
2008	Kat's Mystery Gift	Jon Scieszka's Trucktown	
2008	Kat's Maps	Jon Scieszka's Trucktown	
2008	Meet Jack Truck!	Jon Scieszka's Trucktown	
2008	What a Wreck!	Jon Scieszka's Trucktown	
2008	Melvin Might?	Jon Scieszka's Trucktown	
2008	Snow Trucking!	Jon Scieszka's Trucktown	
2008	Pete's Party	Jon Scieszka's Trucktown	
2008	Truckery Rhymes	Jon Scieszka's Trucktown	
2008	Zoom! Boom! Bully	Jon Scieszka's Trucktown	
2009	Smash That Trash!	Jon Scieszka's Trucktown	
2009	On the Move!	Jon Scieszka's Trucktown	
2009	Uh-Oh, Max	Jon Scieszka's Trucktown	
2010	It's Christmas, David!	David	
2016	Duck on a Tractor	Duck on a...	hardcover
2018	Grow Up, David	David	
2025	That's Not Funny, David	David	
