= Lovely's Fifty Fifty =

Pizzeria in Portland, Oregon, U.S.

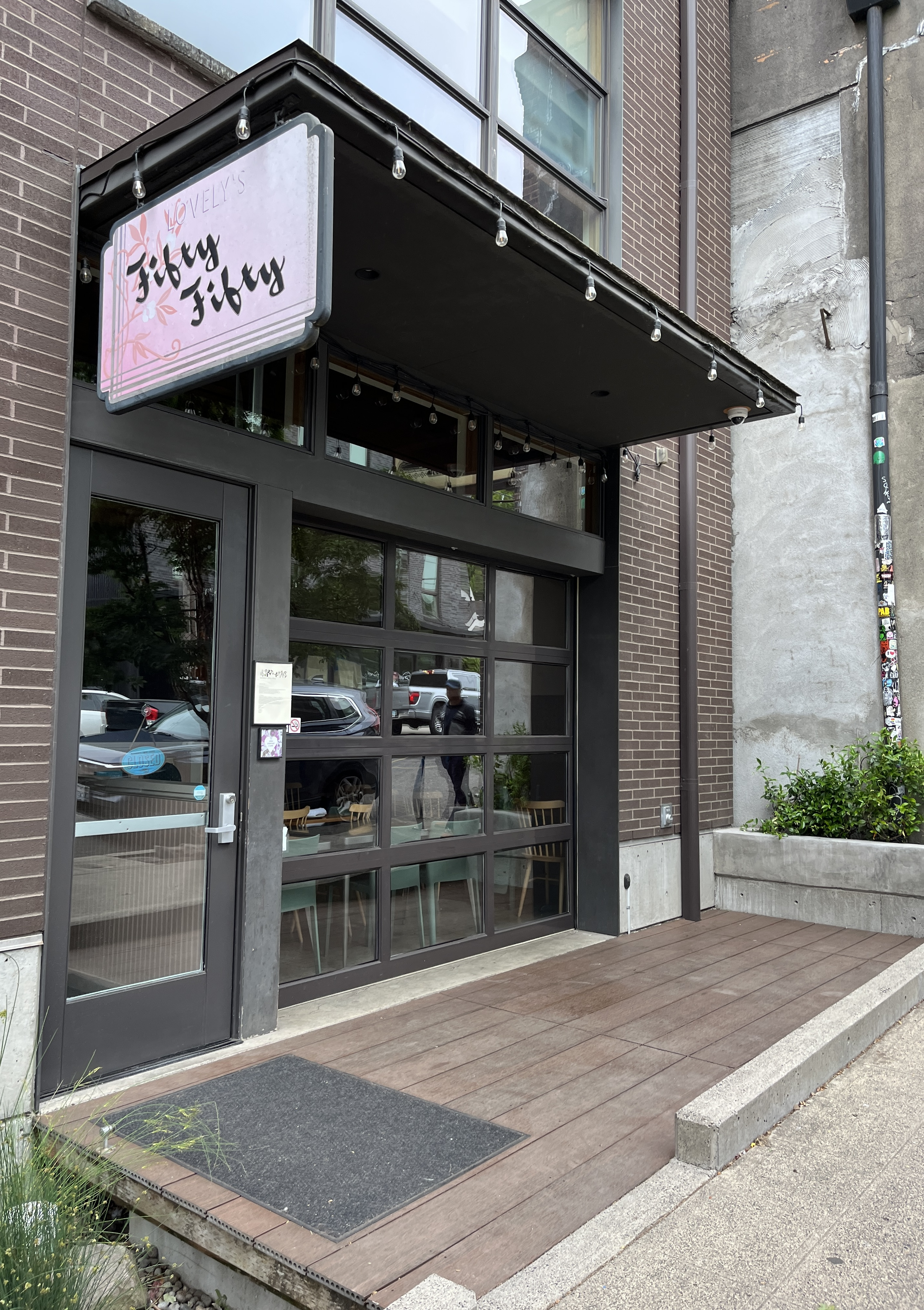
- The restaurant's exterior, 2025
- Interactive map of Lovely's Fifty Fifty

Restaurant information
- Chef: Sarah Minnick
- Location: 4039 North Mississippi Avenue #101, Portland, Multnomah, Oregon, 97227, United States
- Coordinates: 45°33′10.4″N 122°40′33″W
- Website: lovelysfiftyfifty.wordpress.com

Lovely's Fifty Fifty is a pizzeria in Portland, Oregon, United States.

== History ==
The restaurant followed Lovely Hula Hands. The chef is Sarah Minnick.

Lovely's Fifty Fifty was featured on the Netflix series Chef's Table: Pizza in 2022.

== Reception ==
Michael Russell included the pizzeria in The Oregonian's 2019 list of the city's 40 best restaurants. He also ranked Lovely's Fifty Fifty number 14 in the newspaper's 2025 list of Portland's 40 best restaurants.

The business was included in Eater Portland's 2022 "Handy Dining Guide to North Mississippi Avenue". Lovely's Fifty Fifty was included in The Infatuation's 2024 list of Portland's best restaurants. The business was included in Time Out Portland's 2025 list of the city's eighteen best restaurants. Hannah Wallace included the business in Condé Nast Traveler's 2025 list of Portland's 23 best restaurants. The business was included in Portland Monthly's 2025 list of 25 restaurants "that made Portland".

== See also ==
- Pizza in Portland, Oregon
