= Helga Estby =

American suffragist

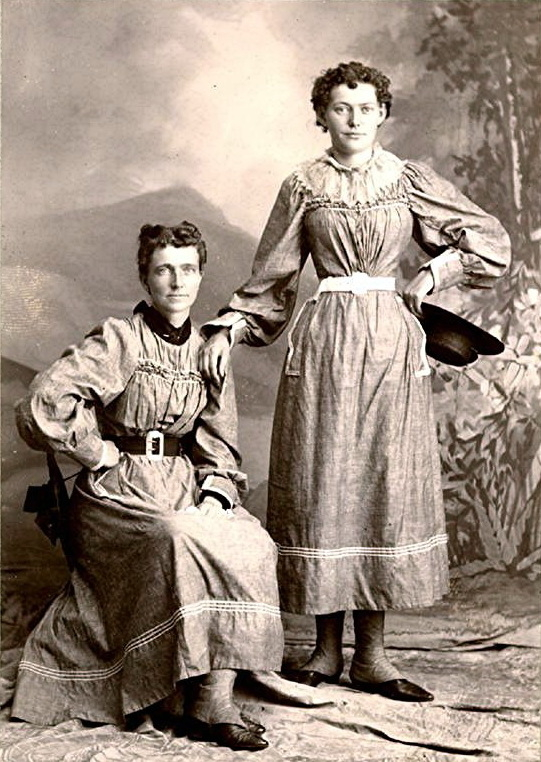
- Helga (left) with her daughter Clara, 1897
- Born: Helga Avilda Ida Marie Johanssen; May 30, 1860; Oslo
- Died: April 20, 1942 (aged 81)
- Known for: suffragist

Helga Estby (May 30, 1860 – April 20, 1942) was an American suffragist most noted for her walk across the United States during 1896.

== Biography ==
Helga Avilda Ida Marie Johanssen was born in Oslo (then called Christiania), Norway. Helga traveled from Norway with her mother, arriving in Manistee, Michigan, during 1871. In 1876, she married Ole Estby, an immigrant from Grue Municipality in Hedmark, Norway. They started their new life together initially homesteading a land patent in Yellow Medicine County near Canby, Minnesota. The family subsequently relocated and settled on a farm in Mica Creek, Spokane County, Washington.

Due to the financial Panic of 1893 and her husband's accidents, the family could not pay the mortgage or taxes on their home and farmland. Together with Clara, her 17-year-old daughter, Helga tried to save her family farm by walking 3,500 miles across country to New York City. Helga had made a bet with an unknown sponsor that would give them $10,000 if they did the walk in seven months. Clara and Helga started the walk from Spokane on May 5. The women walked 25–35 miles a day and were offered shelter along the way, spending only 9 nights without a roof over their head. On Christmas Eve, 1896, the New York World reported their arrival in New York City. On arrival in New York, the sponsor of the contest refused to pay or help them back home, saying the women had missed their deadline. Helga managed to return to her farm only to find that two of her children had died of diphtheria in her absence.

After the Estby family lost their home in Mica Creek, Ole Estby began a construction business in Spokane, Washington. Helga was considered a deserter of her family and was shunned by much of the local Norwegian-American community. Helga went on to become a suffragist and wrote down her story later in her life. Her notes were destroyed, but her story was carried on through oral tradition, by her family and through newspaper clippings saved by her daughter-in-law.

Estby died on April 20, 1942, and was laid to rest in the Mica Creek cemetery near Spokane.

== Legacy ==
- Helga Estby Lodge #47 of the Daughters of Norway in Mountain Home, Idaho, was named in her honor.
- Helga Estby Bold Spirited Scholarship Award was established in her memory by the Women Helping Women Fund in Spokane, Washington.
- Helga Estby's great-granddaughter, Carole Estby Dagg, wrote the historical fiction novel The Year We Were Famous, chronicling her walk from Mica Creek to New York.

== Other sources ==
- Hunt, Linda Lawrence (2005) Bold Spirit: Helga Estby's Forgotten Walk Across Victorian America (Random House) ISBN 978-1-4000-7993-3
- Dagg, Carole Estby (2011) The Year We Were Famous (Houghton Mifflin Harcourt Publishing Company) ISBN 978-0-618-99983-5
- Kirkpatrick, Jane (2011) The Daughter's Walk (WaterBrook Press) ISBN 978-1400074297
