= Wayne Spitzer =

Wayne Kyle Spitzer
- Born: Wayne Kyle Spitzer; July 15, 1966 (age 59); Spokane, Washington, United States
- Occupations: Author, artist, film director, producer, screenwriter
- Years active: 1987–present
- Spouse: Trinh Ngoc Ho

Wayne Kyle Spitzer (born July 15, 1966) is an American author, illustrator, and low-budget horror filmmaker from Spokane, Washington, and founding editor of the publications Dark Horses: The Magazine of Weird Fiction, Black Sheep: Unique Tales of Terror and Wonder, and Mobius Blvd Magazine. He is the author of countless books, stories, and other works, including Flashback, The Ferryman Pentalogy (comprising Comes a Ferryman, The Tempter and the Taker, The Pierced Veil, Black Hole, White Fountain, and To the End of Ursathrax), X-Ray Rider and 7 Other Dark Rites of Passage, Legends of the Flashback: The Finished Saga, The Devil Drives a '66 and Other Stories, The Witch-Doctor Diaries and Other Dystopias, The Place and 10 Other Stories from the Region Between, as well as a film (Shadows in the Garden) and a screenplay (Algernon Blackwood’s The Willows). His work has appeared in MetaStellar—Speculative fiction and beyond, subTerrain Magazine: Strong Words for a Polite Nation and Columbia: The Magazine of Northwest History, among others. His recent fiction includes The War-torn Hills of Earth and The Wine-Dark Passage.

Spitzer was involved in Spokane's underground filmmaking scene from 1994 to 2005. His notable projects include Dead of Night, a Spokane-area (cable TV) broadcast venture, Don't Look Up, and a feature-length compilation, Monstersdotcom, including Shadows in the Garden and Last Stop Station, most of which are available through Vinegar Syndrome Cult Film Preservation and Releasing, as well as Portland-based Black Vvideo, Brimstone LLC, and Seattle-based IndieFlix.

Spitzer has taught creative writing at Corbin Art Center and Airway Heights Corrections Center. He holds a Master of Fine Arts degree in writing from Eastern Washington University, a Bachelor of English from Gonzaga University, and an Associate in Applied Science degree in Television Production from Spokane Falls Community College.
