= Anita Kapoor =

Indian-born Singaporean television presenter

- Born: Anita Kapoor; Mumbai, India
- Occupation: TV host

Anita Kapoor is a television presenter in Singapore. She was born in Mumbai, India but has been living in Singapore since 1978.

== Career ==
Anita has hosted shows on Discovery, TLC, Channel NewsAsia, okto and AXN. Currently she is a host of the show Treasure Hunt on Channel NewsAsia.
