= No, David! =

1998 children's book by David Shannon

- Front cover
- Illustrator: David Shannon
- Cover artist: David Shannon
- Language: English
- Series: Caldecott Honor Book
- Genre: Comedy
- Published: September 1, 1998
- Publisher: Blue Sky Press
- Publication place: United States
- Pages: 32
- Awards: Caldecott Honor Book, ALA Notable Child Bulletin of the Center for Children's Books Blue Ribbon title, School Library Journal Best Book of the Year, New York Times Best Illustrated Book List
- ISBN: 0-590-93002-8

No, David! is a 1998 children's picture book written and illustrated by David Shannon and published by Scholastic Inc. It is based on a homemade book Shannon created as a child, which featured drawings of himself misbehaving and text limited to "no" and "David" as those were the only words Shannon could spell at the time.

== Plot ==
David Shannon is a mischievous young boy who engages in various misbehaviors, such as drawing on the living room wall, overflowing the bath, playing with his food, and picking his nose. Each transgression is met with a scolding from his mother. David eventually goes too far by breaking a vase with a baseball bat, which leads to him being put in timeout. Noticing David's remorse, his mother embraces him and says she loves him.

== Analysis ==
=== Themes ===
This story presents some important ideas and themes for the young audiences that this book is geared to. Various themes such as discipline and proper behavior are very evident, as this book focuses on the mischievous behavior of David when he disobeys rules. Each page of this book has David acting out things he is not supposed to do, and this theme addresses the common issue of disobedient and improper behavior in younger children.

In addition to discipline and proper behavior, parental love and patience is another theme that this short story highlights. Even though this story circulates around the idea of David's mother reprimanding him for all of his disobedient actions, his mother's love for him remains constant and is reinforced at the end of the story with their embrace.

As mentioned in the authors note, this book also is able to help capture the essence of childhood and the curiosity that children often have at such a young age. Through David's mischievous acts, this book provides a look into a young child’s world, allowing all types of readers, adults and children alike, to relate as these acts are common childhood experiences.

=== Illustrations ===
This short story also uses visual elements and illustrations to foreshadow plot developments as well. For instance, with the readers seeing vivid images about him playing baseball with a bat with a vase nearby, it comes with no surprise that the next page there is a tearful David sitting next to the broken vase. These illustrations help reinforce the intended young audience's abilities to identify what the outcomes will be as a result of certain actions.

== Critical reception ==
There were many positive awards and distinctions that were given to this children’s book.

In 1998, No, David! Was recognized as one of New York Times' Best Illustrated Children's Books. This book also was awarded a Bulletin of the Center for Children's Books Blue Ribbon in 1998 as well. In 1999, No, David! won the Caldecott Honor distinction. In addition to this, in that same year, No, David! was also designated as an ALA Notable Children’s Book. In 2007, the National Education Association listed the book as one of its "Teachers' Top 100 Books for Children.” In 2012, No, David! was considered to be one of the "Top 100 Picture Books" of all time in a 2012 poll by School Library Journal.

Since the publishing of this children's book in 1998, this short story has received a variety of different varying receptions, both positive and negative:

Many viewed this book as a story that helped present an imperfect young character navigating through childhood, and that this book can be seen as a way to spark a conversation between caretakers and children about right, wrong, and how it should all be addressed. This book has been widely used amongst families, with there being many book sheets created to help caretakers have these more difficult conversations with these young children.

However, this book also had some negative receptions that came along with its publication. This book did not necessarily pass well with everyone, with this book becoming banned at some school districts as a result of certain illustrations included in the short story.

== Legacy ==
There have been many other books created from this original book. These other books are as follows:

=== Sequels ===
- David Goes to School (1999)
- David Gets in Trouble (2001)
- It's Christmas, David! (2010)
- Grow Up, David! (2018)
- That's Not Funny, David! (2025)

=== Prequels from Diaper David books ===
- David Smells! (2005)
- Oh, David! (2005)
- Oops! (2005)

=== Sticker and activity books ===
- Uh-Oh, David! (2013)

In the fifth sequel, Grow Up, David! (released in 2018), David has an older brother named Alvin.
