= Lovely Hula Hands =

Defunct restaurant in Portland, Oregon, US

- Interactive map of Lovely Hula Hands

Restaurant information
- Established: 2003
- Closed: December 31, 2009
- Owners: Sarah and Jane Minnick
- Head chef: Jesse Garcia
- Chef: Troy MacLarty
- Food type: Pacific Northwest
- Location: Portland, Oregon, United States
- Coordinates: 45°32′46.6″N 122°40′33.7″W

Lovely Hula Hands was a restaurant in Portland, Oregon, United States. It operated from 2003 to 2009.

== Description and history ==
The restaurant opened in 2003. The Oregonian's Grant Butler said the original Lovely Hula Hands operated from a "painted-pink Old Portland saltbox house" (938 North Cook Street), serving Pacific Northwest cuisine representative of the neighborhood's "funkiness". The menu included salt-and-pepper calamari, pan-roasted chicken with mashed potatoes, and a Thai flat iron steak with sticky rice. The pork chop had chipotle barbecue sauce with succotash. Jesse Garcia was the chef in 2004.

The restaurant debuted a new location (4057 North Mississippi Avenue), chef (Troy MacLarty), and menu in November 2006. According to The Oregonian's Michael Russell, the menu "[shifted] from comforting Asian fusion to riskier seasonal fare" and MacLarty "was as known for his seasonal salads as he would later become known for his frequent change of kitchen". MacLarty worked on a Sauvie Island farm one day per week, growing and harvesting ingredients to use at the restaurant.

In December 2009, owners Sarah and Jane Minnick confirmed plans to close on New Year's Eve. Lovely Hula Hands has been called a "parent" to Lovely's Fifty Fifty.

== Reception ==
In 2007, David Hochman of The New York Times said MacLarty was receiving "decent" reviews. In 2016, Grant Butler included Lovely Hula Hands in The Oregonian's list of "97 long-gone Portland restaurants we wish were still around".

== See also ==
- List of defunct restaurants of the United States
- List of Pacific Northwest restaurants
