= Olson Kundig =

American architectural firm

Practice information
- Partners: Tom Kundig Kirsten Ring Murrary, Alan Maskin, Kevin M. Kudo-King, Hemanshu Parwani, Steven Rainville, Marlene Chen, Daniel Ralls, Jamie Slagel, Ming-Lee Yuan, Blair Payson, Edward Lalonde, Mark Olthoff
- Founders: Jim Olson
- Founded: 1966
- Location: Seattle, New York City, Chicago

Significant works and honors
- Awards: 2009 AIA Architecture Firm Award

Website
- https://olsonkundig.com

Olson Kundig is an American architectural firm based in Seattle, Washington, run by architects Jim Olson and Tom Kundig. Founded by Olson in 1966, the firm’s work has grown to encompass museums, commercial and mixed-use design, exhibit design, interior design, places of worship, and residences, often for art collectors. Olson Kundig was awarded the 2009 AIA Architecture Firm Award (as Olson Sundberg Kundig Allen Architects) from the American Institute of Architects.

== History ==
The firm, founded by Jim Olson, has been in business since 1966. Principal and owners have included Jim Olson, Tom Kundig, Rick Sundberg, Kirsten R. Murray, Alan Maskin and Kevin M. Kudo-King. The firm changed its name from Olson Sundberg Kundig Allen Architects to Olson Kundig on January 1, 2010.

The firm launched an interiors studio in 2000. Their first line of accessories, The Tom Kundig Collection, debuted in 2012. In 2022, the firm expanded to New York City, its first office outside of Seattle since 1966. The firm expanded to Chicago in 2024.

The firm size grew to over 350 employees at its peak in the summer of 2025 before rounds of layoffs by the CEO, Hemanshu Parwani, in the fall of 2025.

== Notable works ==
Olson Kundig designed a space for the Gethsemane Lutheran Church in downtown Seattle. The project involves renovation of an existing 1950s building to integrate it into an evolving urban context and construction of 50 new housing apartments.

In 2016, Olson Kundig won the competition for a children's museum annex to the Jewish Museum Berlin.

In 2018, Olson Kundig led the renovation of Seattle's iconic Space Needle.

Notable works of the firm include:

- Palm Beach Residence, Florida (Under Construction)
- Aman Residences, Amanyara, Providenciales, Turks and Caicos (Under Construction)
- LeBron James Innovation Center, Beaverton, Oregon (2022)
- The Burke Museum, Seattle (2019)
- Noah’s Ark Exhibit, Skirball Cultural Center, Los Angeles (2007)
- Delta Shelter, Washington (2004)
- Chicken Point Cabin, Idaho (2003)
- Pratt Fine Arts Center, Seattle (2002)
- The Brain, Seattle (2001)
- Mission Hill Winery, Westbank, British Columbia (2001)
- Ridge House, Washington (2001)
- Red House, Denver (1999)
- Studio House, Seattle (1998)
- Frye Art Museum, Seattle (1997)
- Hillclimb Court Building, Seattle (1985)
- Gallery House, Seattle (1985)
- Pike & Virginia Building, Seattle (1978)
- Earth House, Washington (1969)

== Awards and honors ==
The firm has won more than 70 regional and national AIA awards, as well as awards from the Chicago Athenaeum. Tom Kundig was awarded the 2008 National Design Award in Architecture from the Cooper-Hewitt, National Design Museum, an Academy Award in Architecture from the American Academy of Arts and Letters in 2007, and the Emerging Architecture Award from the Architectural League of New York in 2004. Jim Olson received the AIA Seattle Medal of Honor in 2007.

In 2024, the firm was honored on Architectural Digest's AD100 list, for the 11th consecutive and 16th overall inclusion of the firm.
