= B. R. Ostrander =

American politician

Member of the Washington House of Representatives
- In office 1889–1891

Personal details
- Born: November 1843 Ohio, United States
- Died: December 14, 1922 (aged 79) Spokane, Washington, United States
- Party: Republican

Benjamin R. Ostrander (November 1843 – December 14, 1922) was an American politician in the state of Washington. He was a Republican and served in the Washington House of Representatives from 1889 to 1891.
