= Student Center (Seattle University) =

Building in Seattle, Washington, U.S.

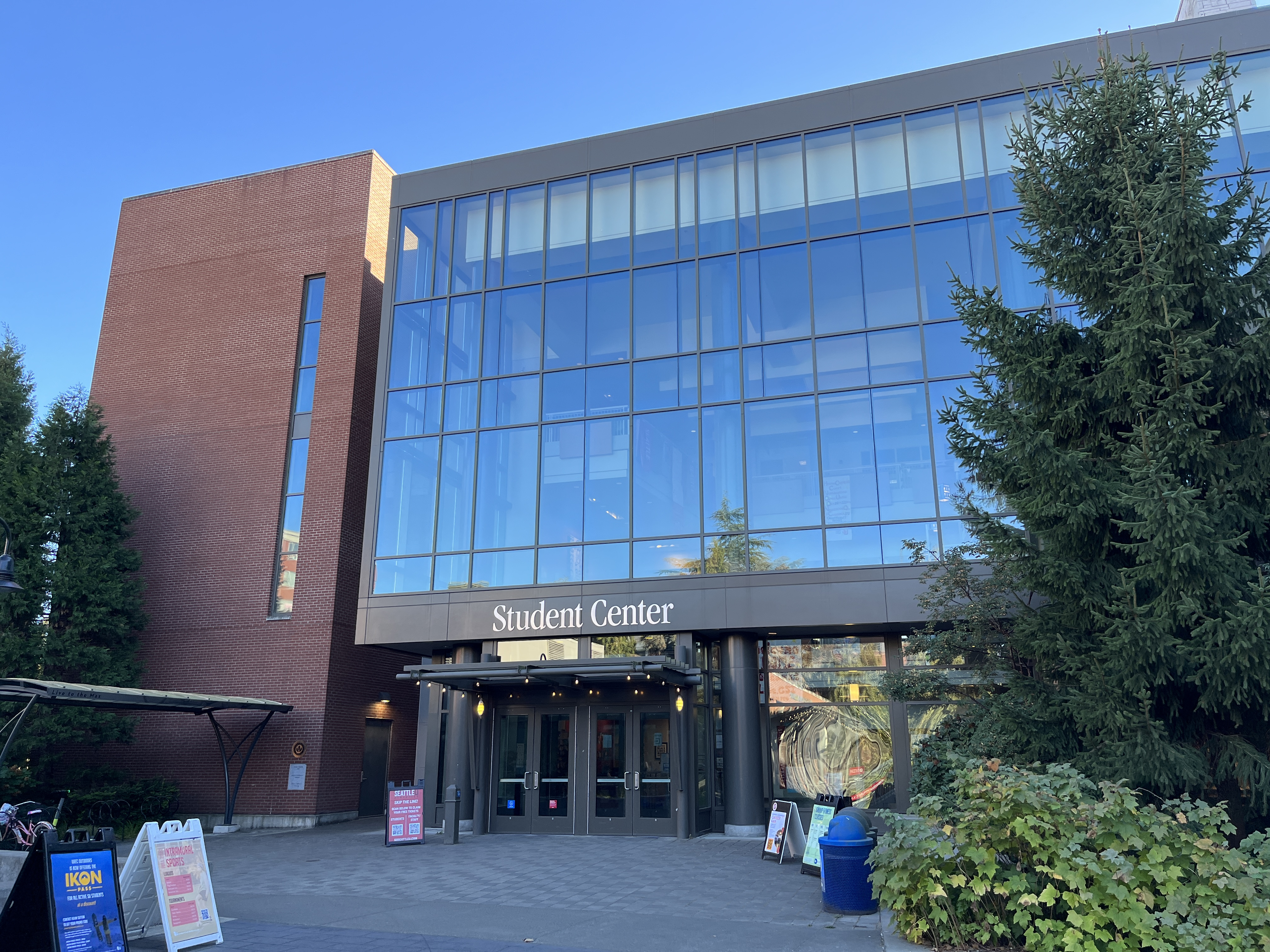
- The building's exterior, 2022
- Interactive map of the Student Center area

General information
- Location: Seattle, Washington, United States
- Coordinates: 47°36′30″N 122°19′5″W

The Student Center is a building on the Seattle University campus, in the U.S. state of Washington.

The building houses Counseling and Psychological Services as of 2017, and the Wellness and Health Promotion Center as of 2022.
