= Garrand Hall =

Building in Seattle, Washington, U.S.

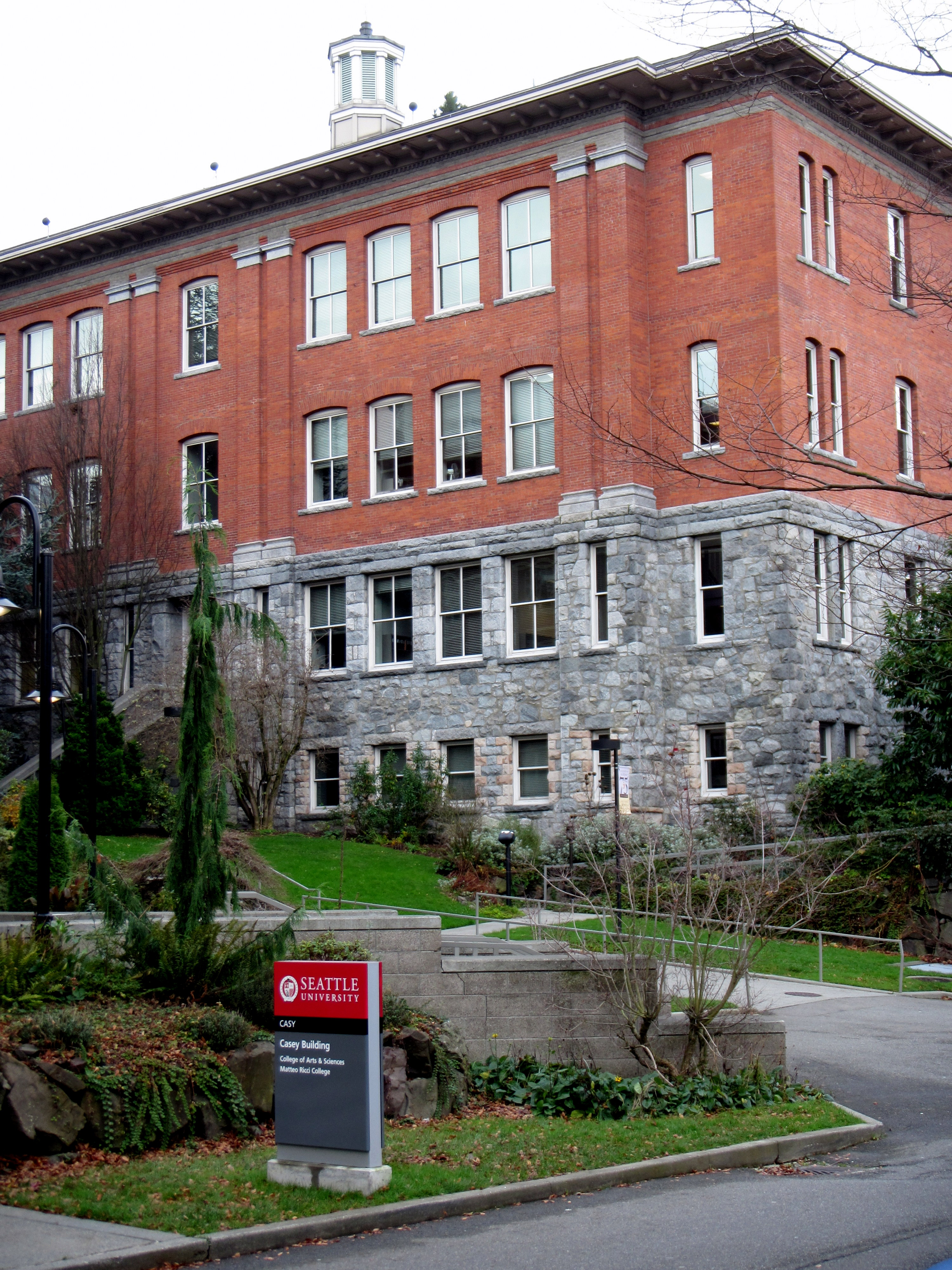
- The building's exterior, 2012
- Interactive map of the Garrand Hall area

General information
- Location: Seattle, Washington, United States
- Coordinates: 47°36′38″N 122°19′11″W

Garrand Hall is a building on the Seattle University campus in the U.S. state of Washington. It opened in 1894.
