= Jim and Janet Sinegal Center for Science and Innovation =

Building in Seattle, Washington, U.S.

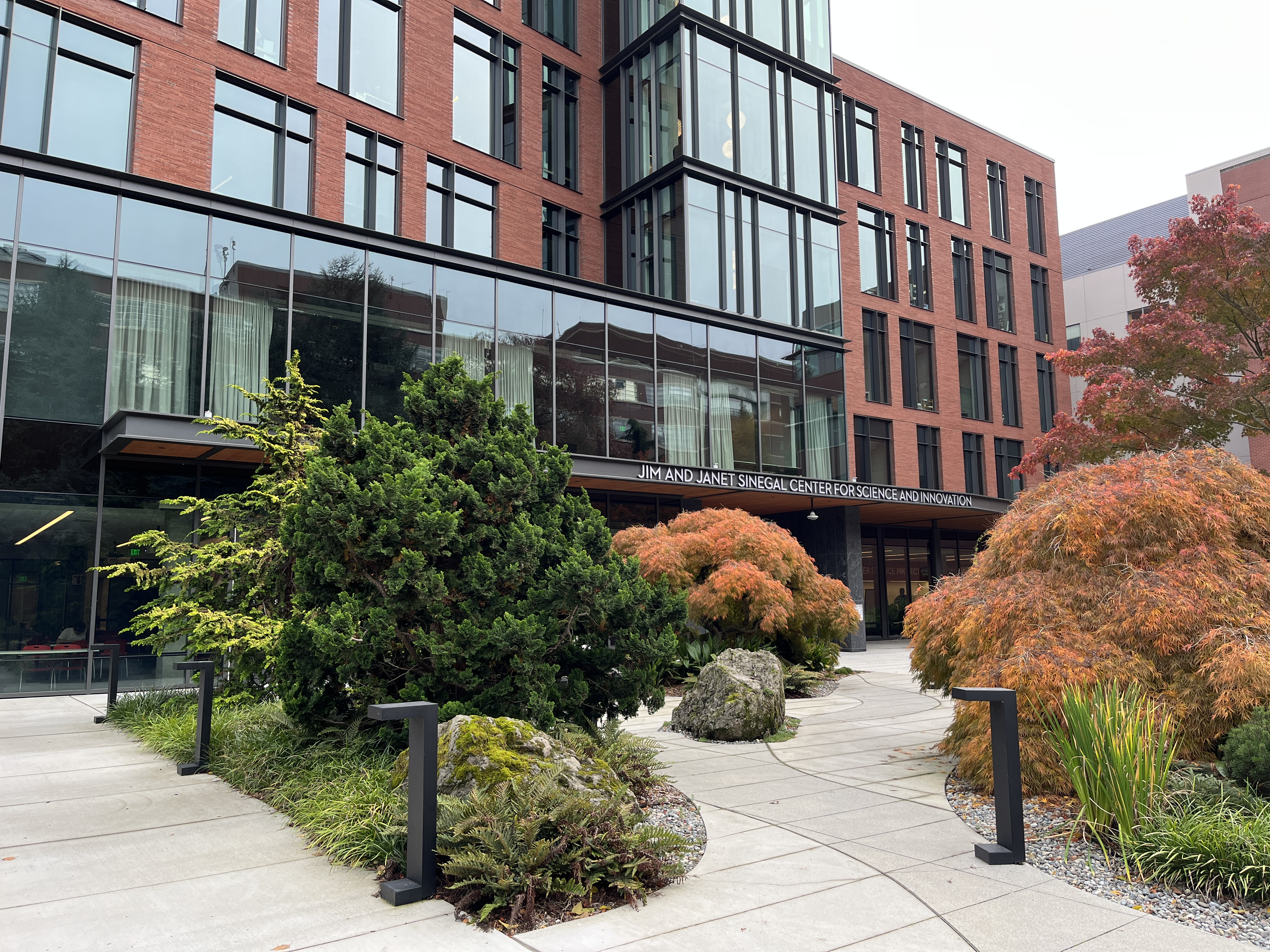
- The building's exterior, 2023
- Interactive map of the Jim and Janet Sinegal Center for Science and Innovation area

General information
- Location: Seattle, Washington, United States
- Coordinates: 47°36′36″N 122°19′2″W

The Jim and Janet Sinegal Center for Science and Innovation is a five-story, 111,000-square-foot science and technology building on the Seattle University campus, in the U.S. state of Washington.

== Description ==
The building houses Billodue Makerspace, which has "maker-related activities including sewing, fiber arts, bike maintenance, 3D printing, laser cutting, electronics, vinyl cutting and glass work", according to Seattle Spectator. Artworks in the building include an untitled painting by Ronnie Tjampitjinpa and Corrupt OS (Portrait of John Stanley Ford) by Anthony White.

== History ==
The building opened in 2021. Amazon contributed $3 million for its construction.

== Reception ==
In 2023, the building was among 27 winners of the Society for College and University Planning's SCUP Excellence Awards, which recognize "achievement in strategic, integrated planning that results in exemplary higher education buildings, landscapes and grounds".

In 2024, the building received a Higher Education Design Award from the International Interior Design Association New England (IIDA NE) Chapter.
