= Seattle University =

Jesuit university in Seattle, Washington, US

- Former names: Immaculate Conception Parish School (1891–1898); Seattle College (1898–1948)
- Motto: For the difference we make
- Type: Private university
- Established: 1891; 135 years ago
- Accreditation: NWCCU
- Religious affiliation: Catholic Church (Jesuit)
- Academic affiliations: ACCU, AJCU, NAICU
- Endowment: $318.3 million (2024)
- President: Maura Mast
- Provost: Shane P. Martin
- Faculty: 510 full-time 219 part-time
- Students: 7,189 (fall 2024)
- Undergraduates: 4,103 (fall 2024)
- Postgraduates: 3,086 (fall 2024)
- Location: Seattle, Washington, United States; 47.61°N 122.32°W
- Campus: Urban 55 acres (22 ha)
- Newspaper: The Spectator
- Radio Station: KXSU (102.1 FM)
- Colors: Red White
- Nickname: Redhawks
- Sporting affiliations: NCAA Division I – WCC
- Mascot: Rudy the Redhawk
- Website: seattleu.edu

Seattle University (Seattle U or SU) is a private Jesuit university in Seattle, Washington, United States. It is the largest independent university in the Northwestern United States, with over 7,500 students enrolled in undergraduate and graduate programs within seven schools.

== History ==
In 1891, Adrian Sweere, S.J., took over a small parish school near downtown Seattle at Broadway and Madison. At first, the school was named after the surrounding Immaculate Conception parish and did not offer higher education. In 1898, the school was renamed after the city it was located in as Seattle College, which itself was named after Chief Seattle.

Seattle College granted its first bachelor's degrees 11 years later. Initially, the school served as both a high school and a college. From 1919 to 1931, the college moved to Interlaken Boulevard but in 1931 it returned to First Hill permanently. When the college moved back to First Hill, it split off the High School portion of the school, which remained on Interlaken, as Seattle Preparatory High School. They remained connected through the Matteo Ricci program, which ended in 2017, and the many Seattle Prep Students who go to Seattle University for undergrad.

In 1931, Seattle College created a night school for women, though admitting women was highly controversial at the time. The night school classes actually began at noon, and were spearheaded by James McGoldrick, who stood up to Seattle's bishop when he complained. In 1934 a Superior General in Rome investigated the night school, but the president of Seattle College was able to keep it open for the reason that its numbers were needed to maintain the college's accreditation. The college was one of the first coeducational Jesuit colleges in the U.S., and these institutions were only sanctioned two decades later.

The college's School of Nursing opened in 1935, and many women from the college joined the Army Base Hospital 50 unit in 1942 for World War II. The first Black students at Seattle University enrolled after World War II ended. Sam Smith was the first to enroll and Millie Bown Russell the second, although Russell graduated first in 1948.

In 1948, Seattle College renamed itself to its current name of Seattle University under president Albert A. Lemieux. In 1993, the Seattle University School of Law was established through the purchase of the Law School of the University of Puget Sound in Tacoma, and the School of Law moved to the Seattle campus in 1999.

In 2009, Seattle University completed its largest capital campaign, raising almost $169 million. This led to investment in the scholarship fund, academic programs and professorships, a fitness complex, an arts center, and the $56 million Lemieux Library and McGoldrick Learning Commons, completed in fall 2010.

In 2024, Seattle real estate developer Richard Hedreen donated his $300 million art collection to the university in honor of his late wife, alumna Betty Hedreen, marking one of the largest single gifts to a university ever made.

In December 2024, the university announced that it would acquire Cornish College of the Arts. This transaction became official in 2025 with the establishment of Cornish College of the Arts at Seattle University, which became SU's seventh college.

== Campus ==
Seattle University occupies two campuses covering about 55 acres. The main campus is located in the city's First Hill neighborhood, east of downtown Seattle and immediately adjacent to the Capitol Hill neighborhood and is known as the First Hill Campus. The second campus, located about 1.5 miles west of the First Hill Campus, is the South Lake Union campus and is home to Cornish College of the Arts at Seattle University. Seattle University's campus has been recognized by the city of Seattle and EPA for its commitment to sustainability through pesticide-free grounds, a food waste compost facility, recycling, and energy conservation program.

The campus includes numerous works by well-known artists: the Centennial Fountain by Seattle artist George Tsutakawa; a large glass sculpture in the PACCAR Atrium of Pigott Hall by Tacoma artist Dale Chihuly; and works by Chuck Close, Jacob Lawrence, Gwendolyn Knight, William Morris, and David Mach.

Undergraduate enrollment in 2024 was composed of 50.0% White, 33.7% Asian, 14.4% Hispanic, 8.4% Black, 3.5% Pacific Islander, 1.9% Native American, and 2.0% Other/Unknown; approximately 14% of the student body identifies with more than one ethnicity. 9.0% of the student body are made up of international students. The gender makeup of the undergraduate student body is 61% Female and 39% Male.

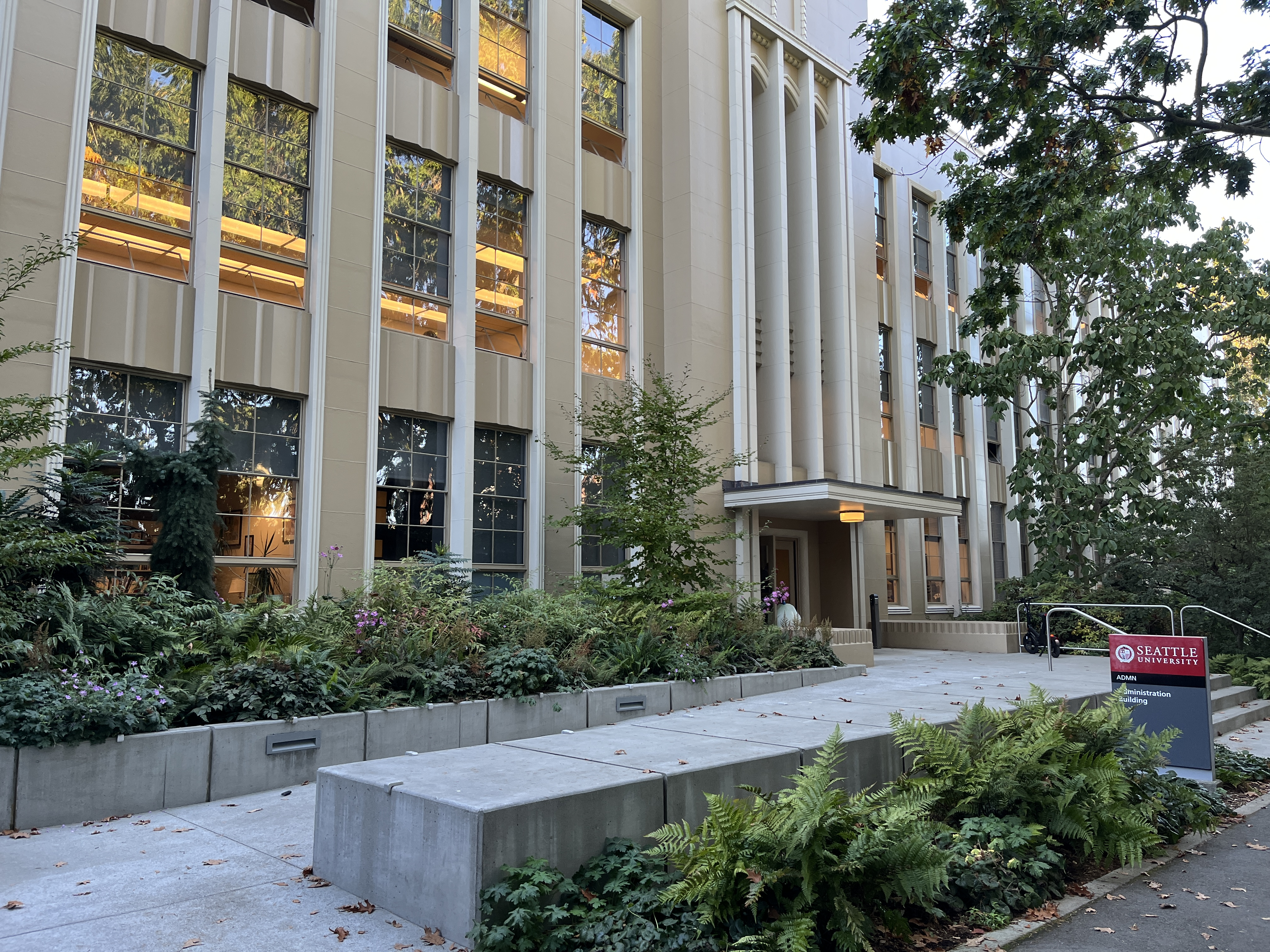
Administration Building from the upper mall

=== Administration Building ===
The Administration Building is home to the office of the president and other administrative offices for Seattle University on the first floor of the building. It also houses classrooms on the upper floors which house classes from a variety of disciplines and the core curriculum. It was the site of student protests around the Israel Palestine conflict in 2024.

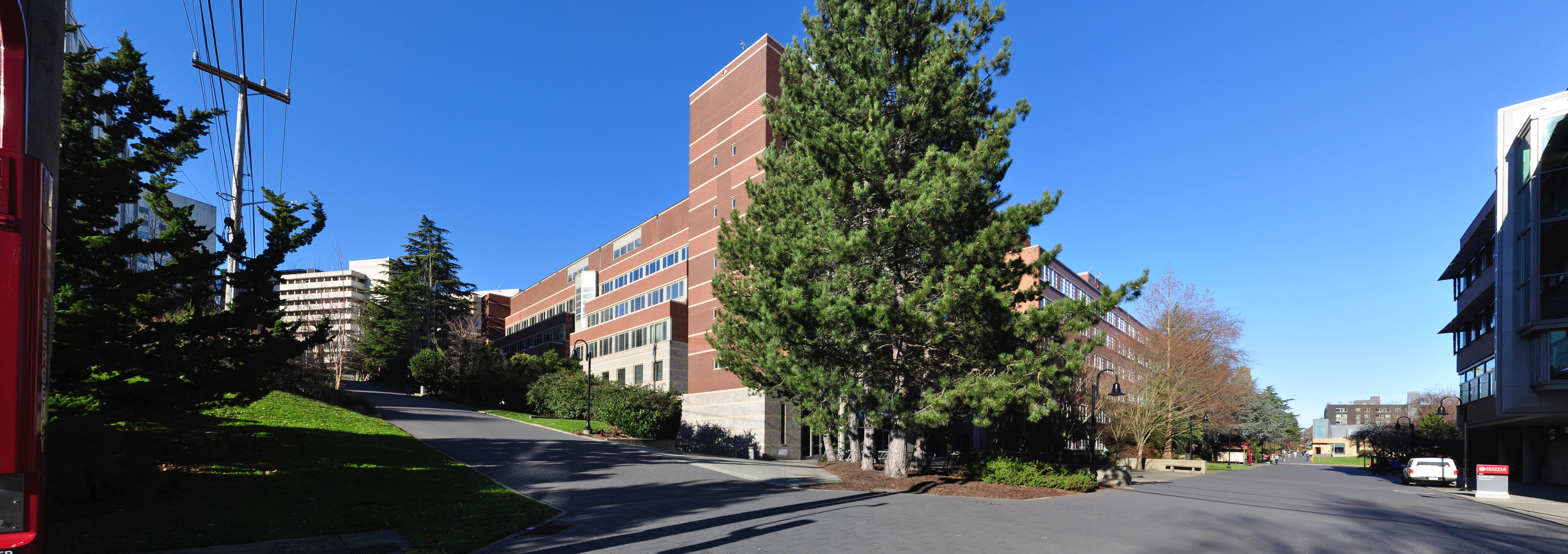
Bannan Center from the lower mall

=== Bannan Center ===
The Bannan Center for Science and Engineering is a building with two wings which house the science and engineering departments. Science and Engineering each have a separate wing of the building which were previously separate buildings. The building overlooks the Centennial Fountain and has entrances on both the upper and lower malls of campus.

While the biology, chemistry, and computer science program used to be housed with the science and engineering programs, they has primarily moved to the new Center for Science and Innovation. The Bannan Center underwent renovations in 2020 alongside construction of the new Center for Science and Innovation.

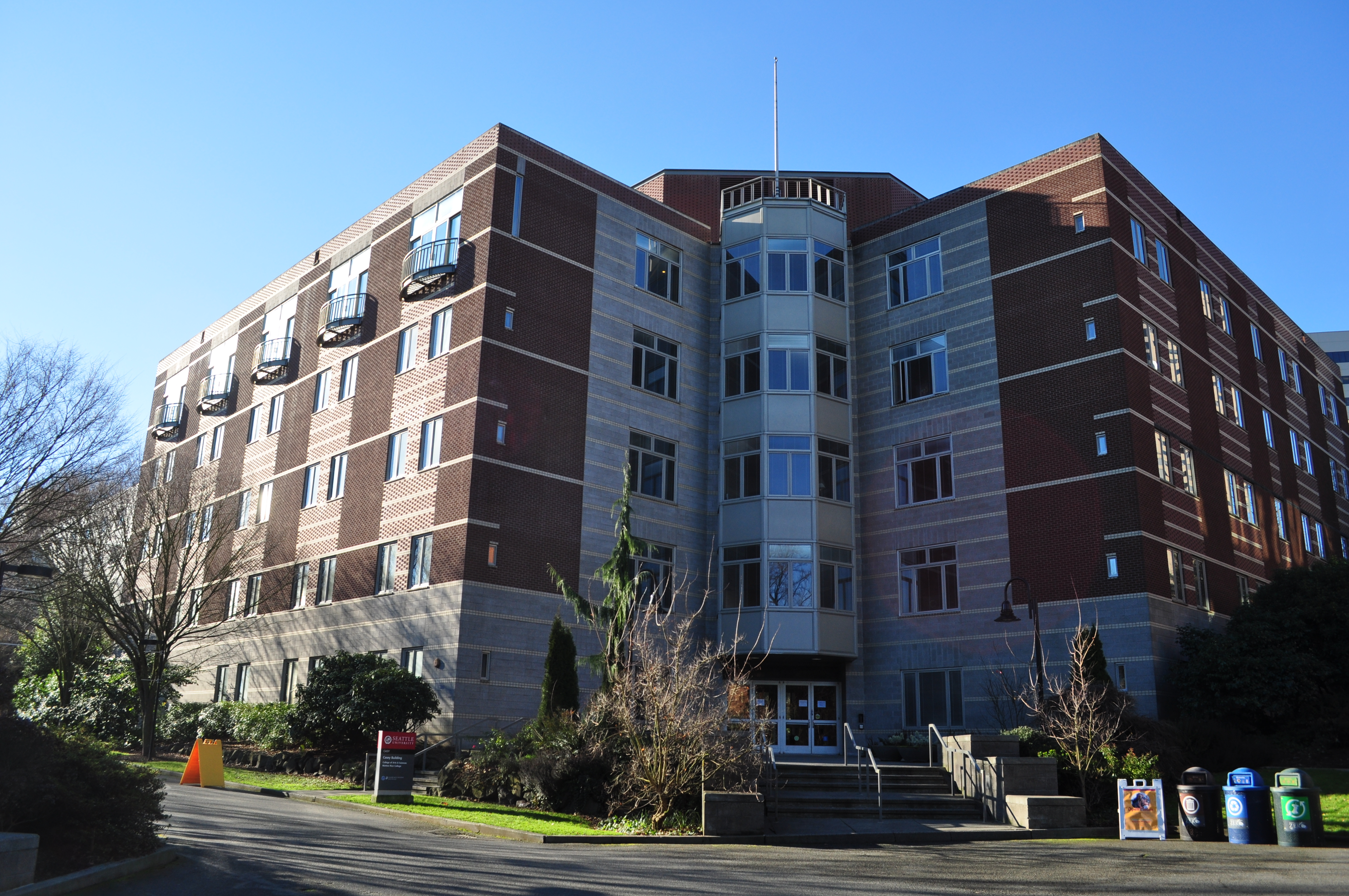
Seattle U's Casey Building

=== Casey Building ===
Home to the College of Arts and Sciences, the Casey Building is a five-story building housing the college's administrative offices and a majority of the undergraduate and graduate departments. It features multiple meeting and conference rooms, the office of the Dean, and a five-floor glass atrium overlooking the gardens hidden behind the building. The building also had McCrory’s Clock installed in front of it in November, 2024. It sits along the upper mall of Seattle U's campus across from the Centennial Fountain.

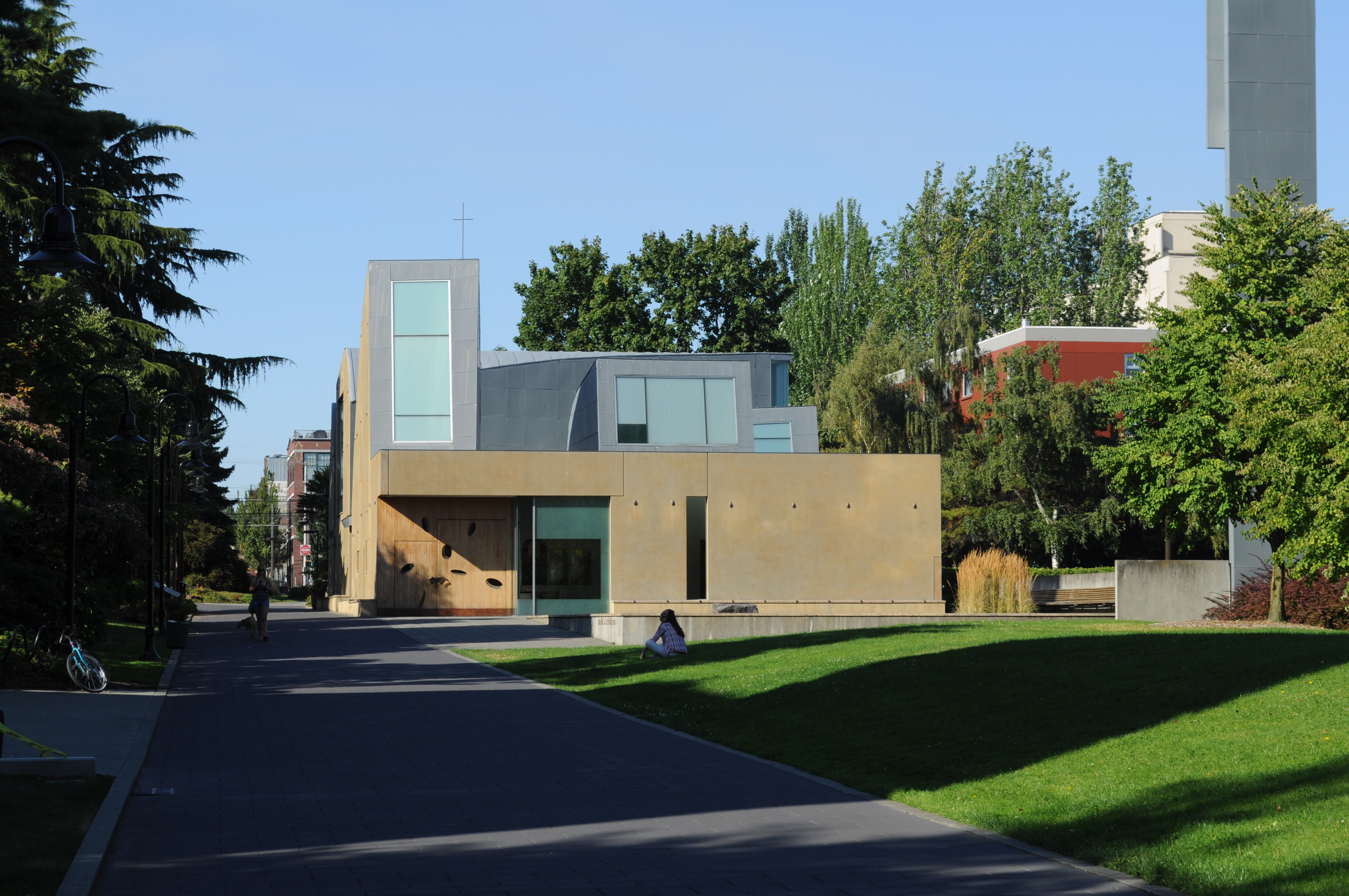
Chapel of St. Ignatius

=== Chapel of St. Ignatius ===
The Chapel of St. Ignatius on campus, designed by Washington born, New York based architect Steven Holl, won a national Honor Award from the American Institute of Architects in 1998. At night the chapel sends beacons of multi-colored lights out onto the campus.

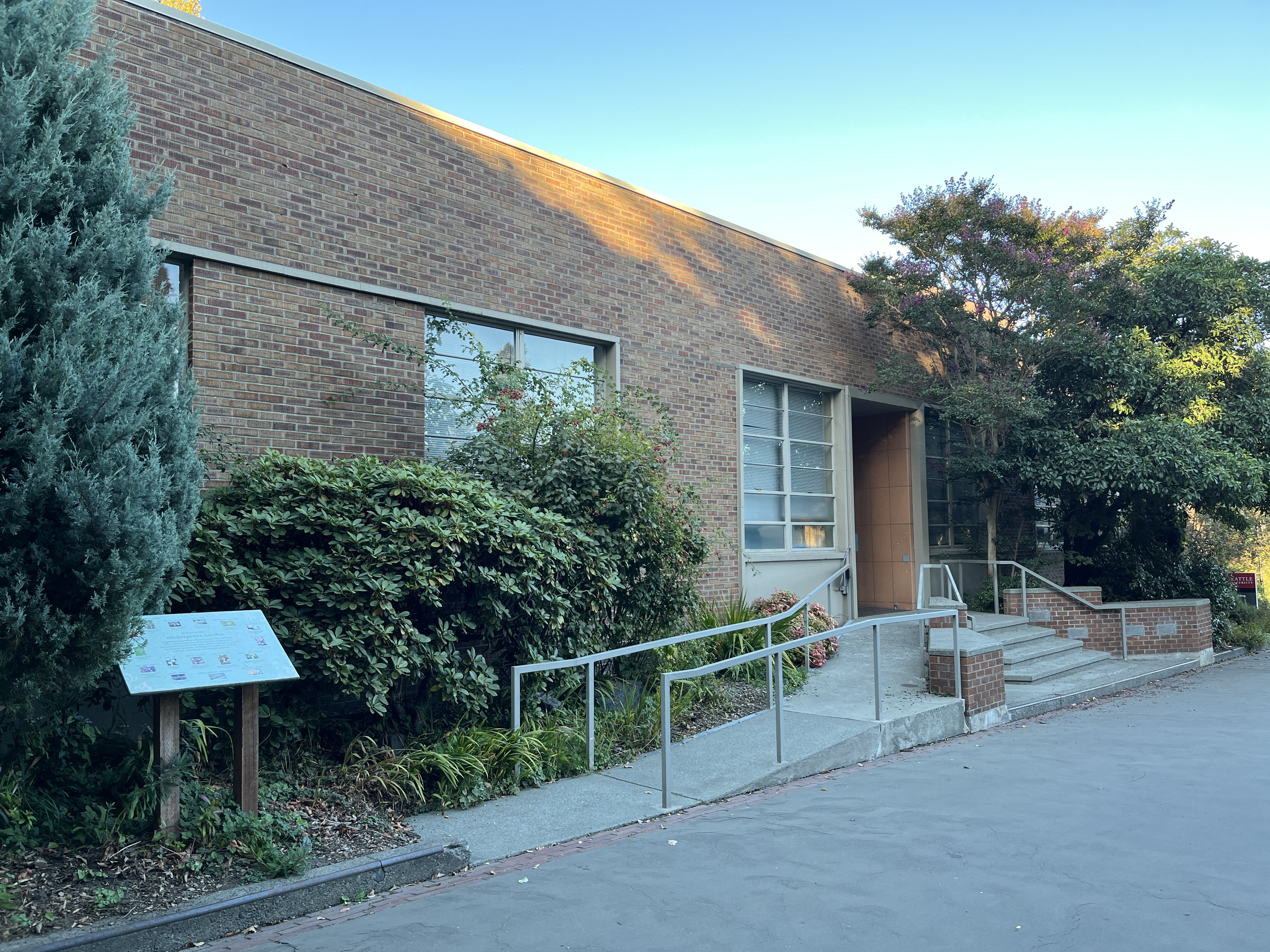
Fine Arts Building exterior

=== Fine Arts Building ===
Overlooking the largest open lawn on the Seattle University campus, the Fine Arts Building houses the classrooms, administrative offices of the Art and Art History Department and the Performing Arts and Arts Leadership Department, as well as the department's Vachon Room: an open 2,000-square-foot (190 m^{2}) performance space used for rehearsals, exhibits, live theater and other events of artistic expression. Adjacent to the Fine Arts Building, the recently remodeled Hunthaussen Hall also contains several learning spaces, a design studio and digital art lab.

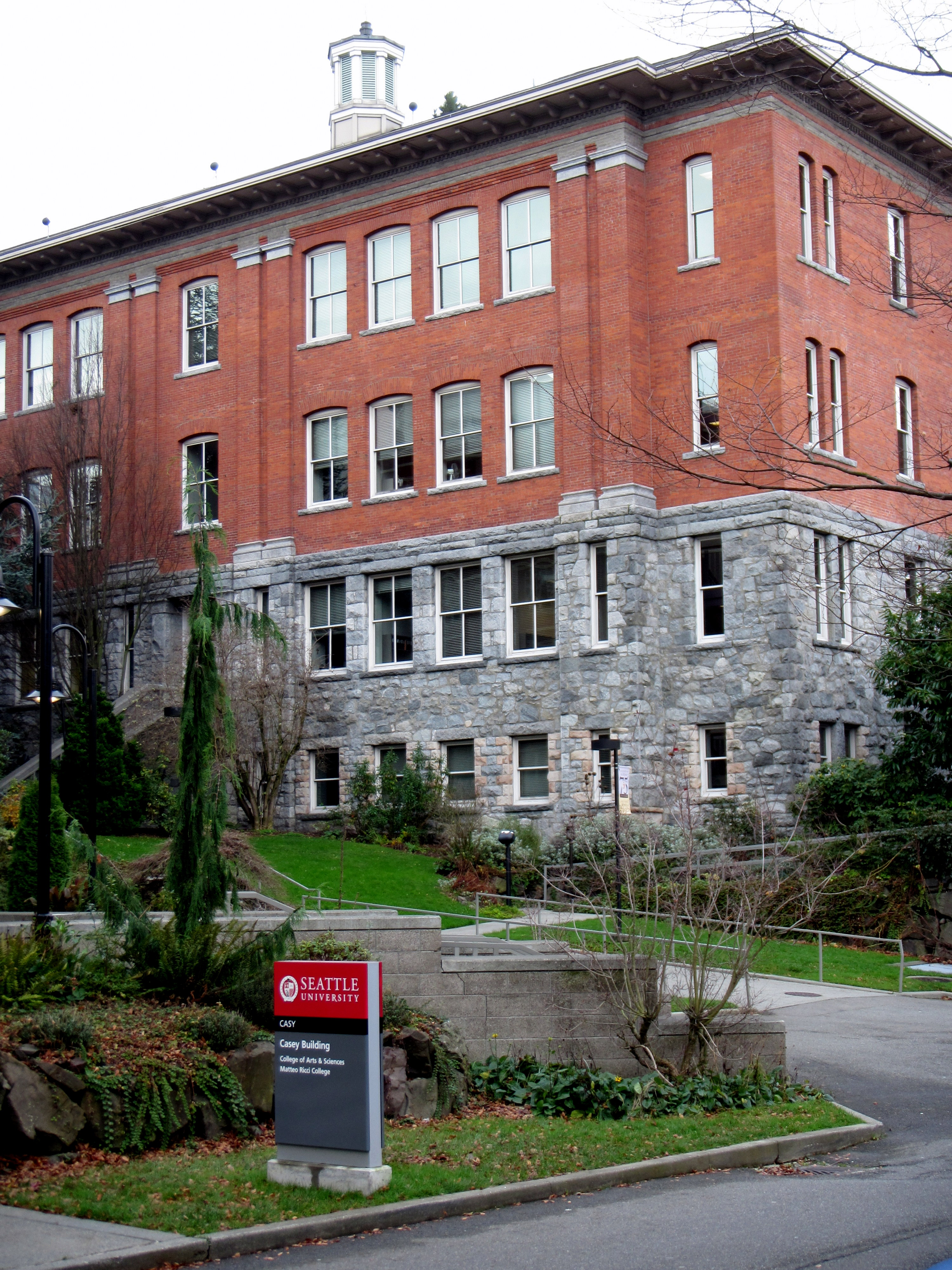
Garrand Hall from the upper mall

=== Garrand Hall ===
Garrand Hall was Seattle University's first permanent building opening in 1894 built primarily by volunteers from Seattle's German and Irish immigrant communities. It now houses the College of Nursing, but is not the location of any of the simulation labs for the nursing students. It is on the upper mall of campus between the Casey and Administration buildings.

=== Hunthausen Hall ===
Hunthausen Hall is named for Rev. Raymond Hunthausen and housed the School of Theology and Ministry (STM) until Seattle U closed the program in 2020 amid the COVID-19 pandemic and the STM operating at a significant deficit. It east of the fine arts building on the eastern end of campus.

=== Jeanne Marie & Rhoady Lee Center for the Arts ===
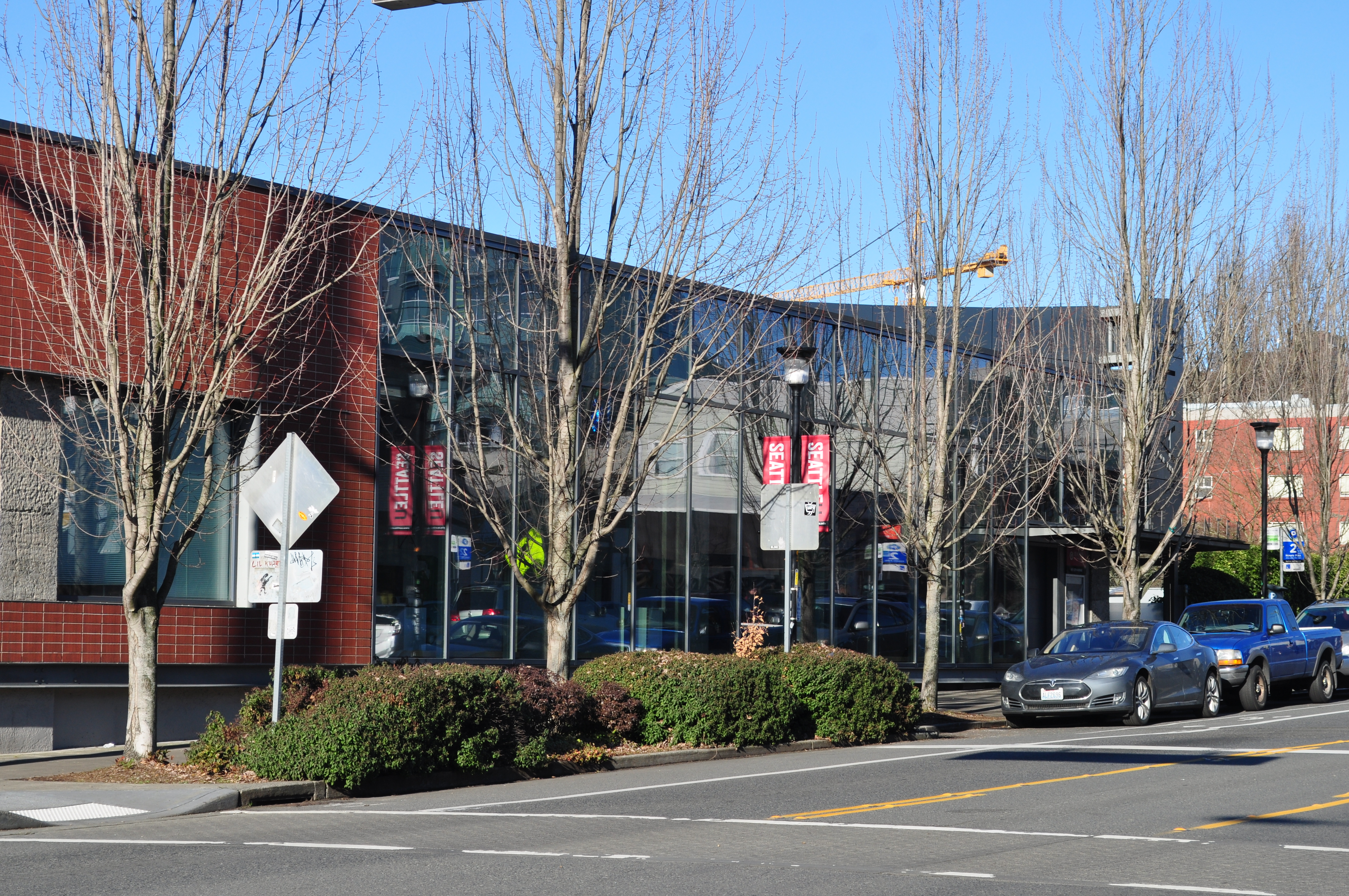
Lee Center from 12th Ave

Seattle University opened The Jeanne Marie & Rhoady Lee Center on February 14, 2006. A performance and exhibition space on the corner of 12th Avenue and East Marion Street, the facility was designed for use by Seattle University students, Seattle artists, and the wider community.

The Center for the Arts houses a 150-seat flexible theater designed for drama, dance, and ensemble music. It also houses The Hedreen Gallery, a lobby art gallery for the public display of visual art by students and visiting artists visible through over 90 feet (27 m) of plate glass windows along Twelfth Avenue. The Center also includes a scene shop, costume shop, prop room, green room, dressing room, and ticket booth.

Designed in conjunction with the managing and artistic directors of local theater and dance companies as well as with Seattle University faculty, the performance space is usable by a wide variety of visiting artists and resident companies. Both stage and seating are mobile and removable. The theater is equipped with lighting and sound technology operated from an elevated control booth. The exterior decor coordinates with the surrounding campus, while the lobby art gallery along 12th Avenue is another feature.

The site of the Lee Center is currently under consideration to be the home of the new Seattle University Museum of Art which was designed by architecture firm Olson Kundig. The plan to redevelop the building and remove the Lee Center has drawn backlash from faculty and students who have advocated for developing the new museum on the site while preserving the Lee Center as the highest quality performing arts education space on Seattle U's First Hill campus.

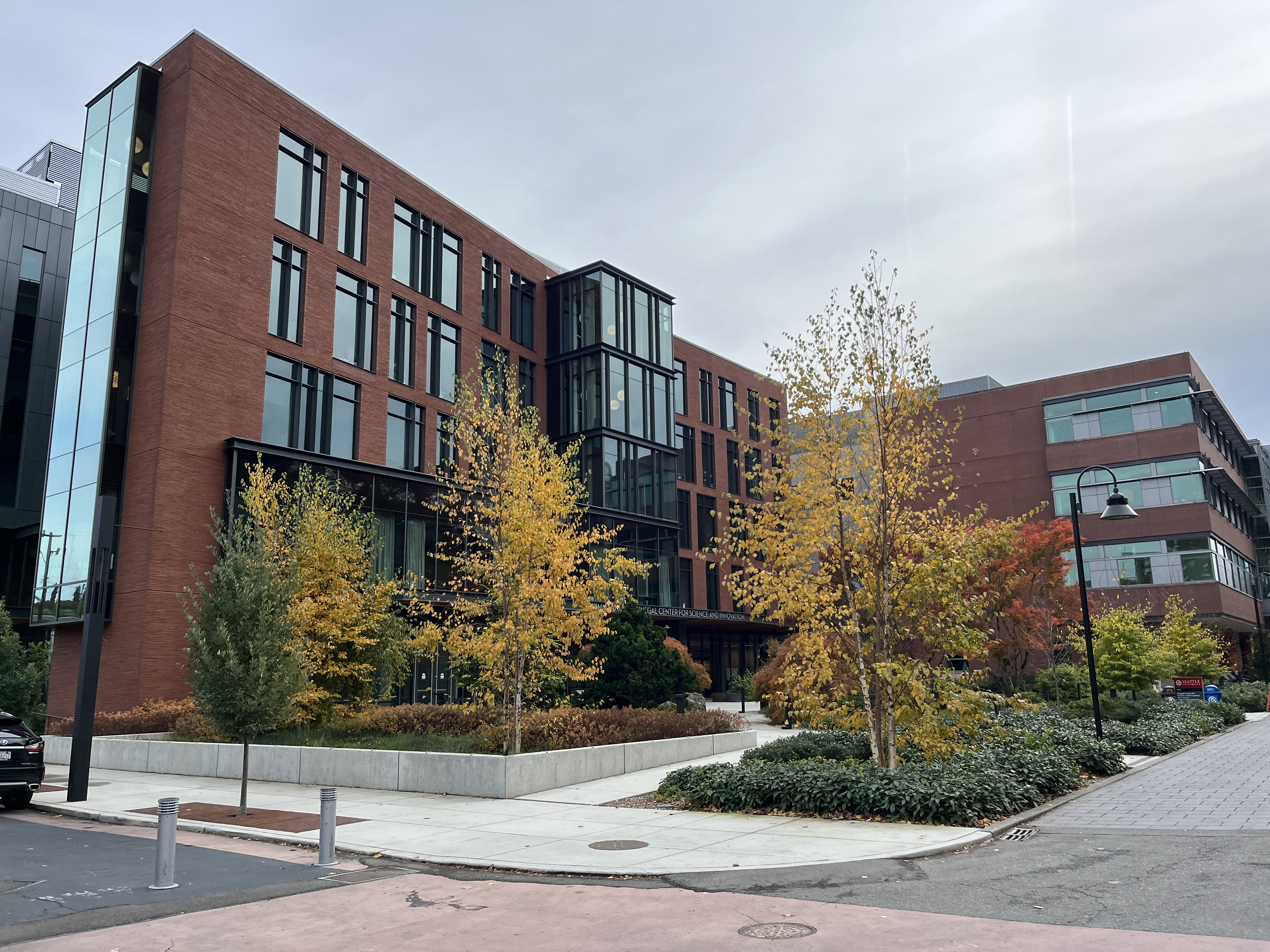
Sinegal Center and its gardens.

=== Jim and Janet Sinegal Center for Science and Innovation ===
The Sinegal Center is the newest building on Seattle U's campus opening for the 2021 academic year. It is the fifth LEED Gold Certified building on campus and had a reported budget of $100 Million. It was built to house Seattle U's growing STEM program and as a new home for the Student run radio station KXSU. It also houses the Convergence Zone which is an on-campus plant-based dining option for students.

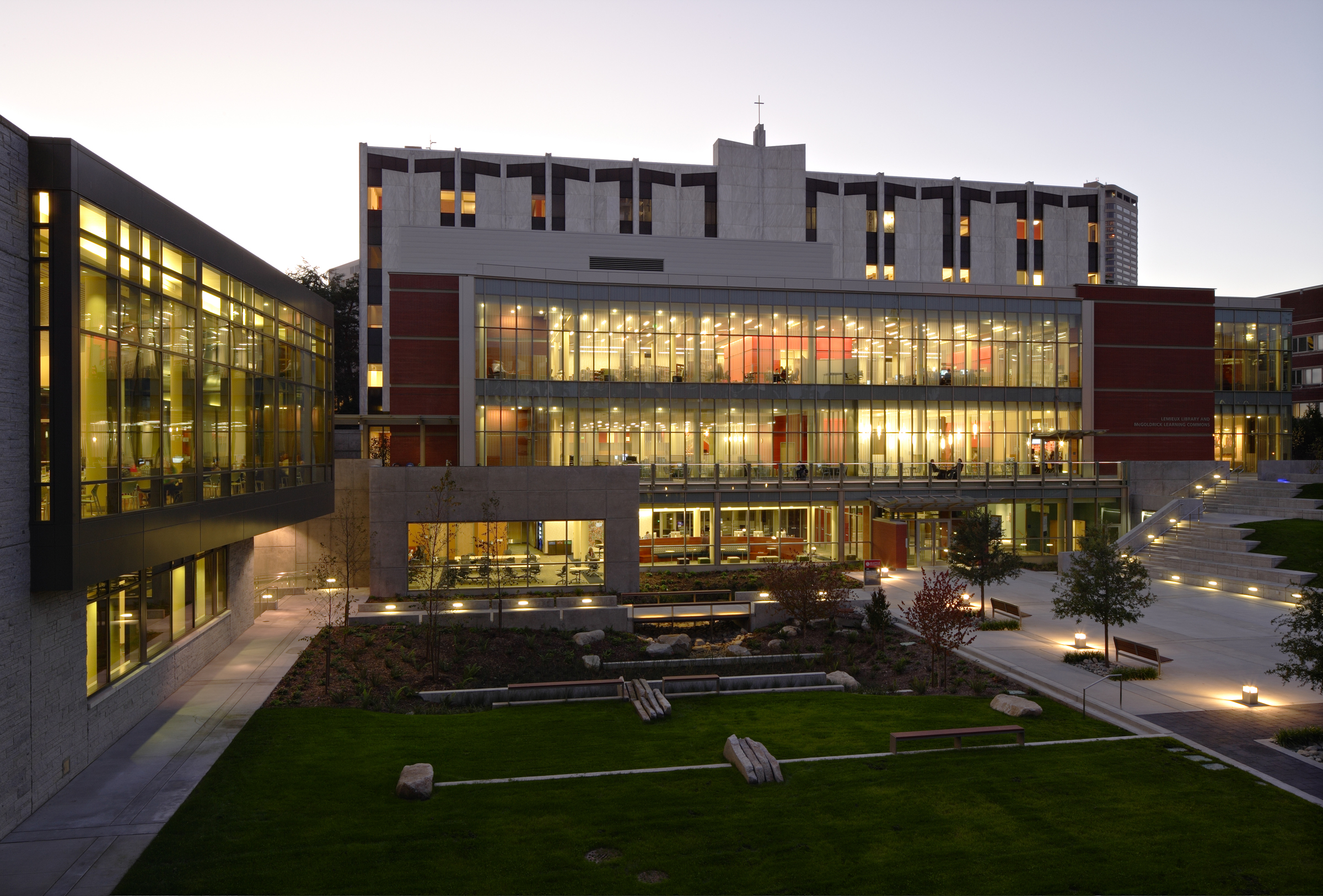
Lemieux Library and McGoldrick Learning Commons

=== Lemieux Library ===
The Lemieux Library was founded in 1991. As of 2011 it contained 216,677 books and subscribed to 1,604 periodicals. It is a member of the American Theological Library Association. It also contains a large bank of the school's computer labs and a school-run café called The Byte.

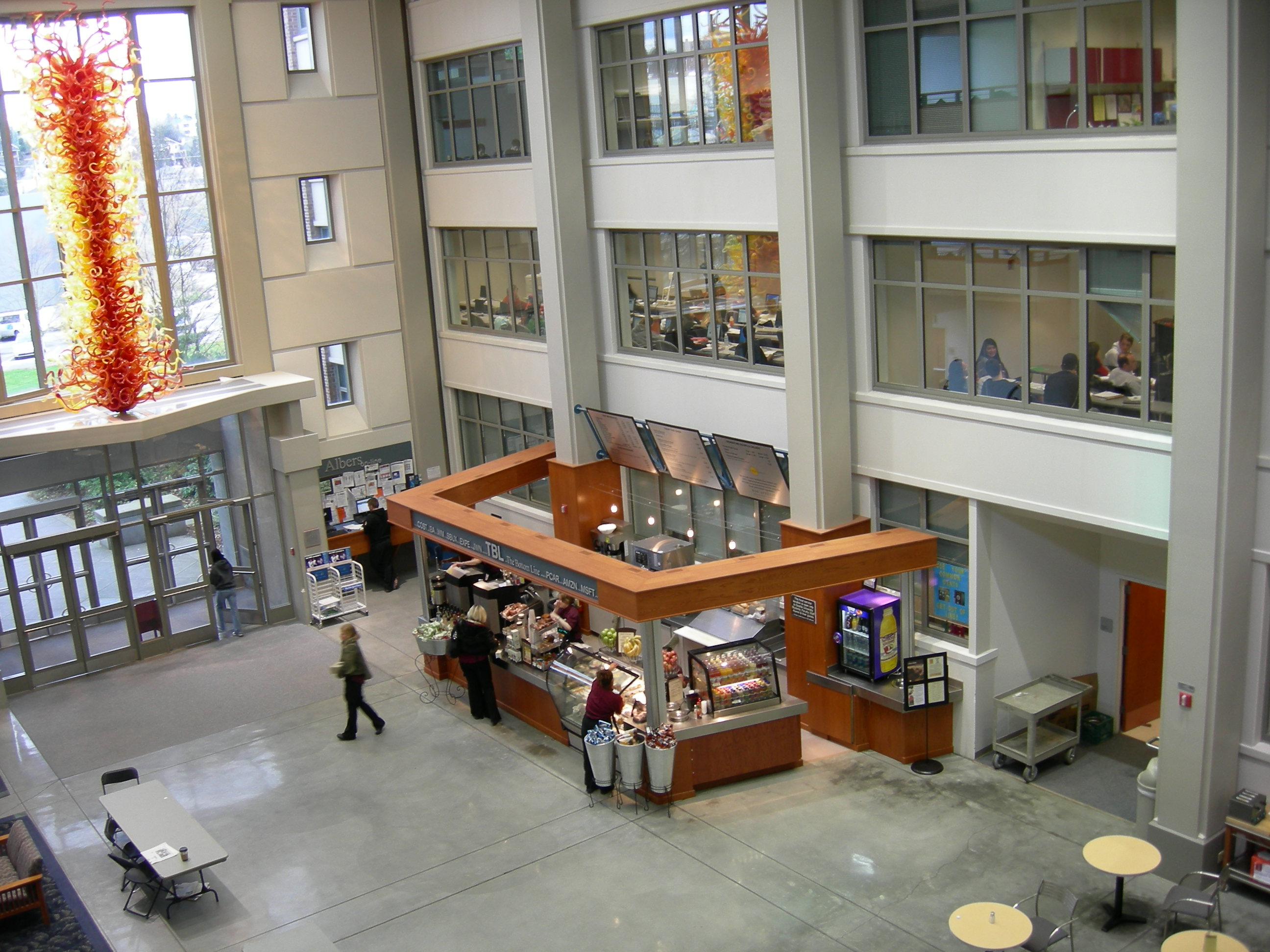
Pigott Building Atrium with Accendo by Dale Chihuly

=== Pigott Building ===
The Pigott Building is home to Albers School of Business and Economics. It houses the largest auditorium on Campus, the Pigott Auditorium which has hosted a Seattle Mayoral debate and various on-campus events. It is located between the lower and upper malls of campus with entrances from both.

The Pigott building has a large atrium which houses an on-campus dining option called The Bottom Line. It also has a large glass sculpture by Dale Chihuly called "Accendo".

=== Residence Halls ===
Students at Seattle U are required to live on campus for the first two years of their undergraduate degree unless they live within 20 miles of campus.

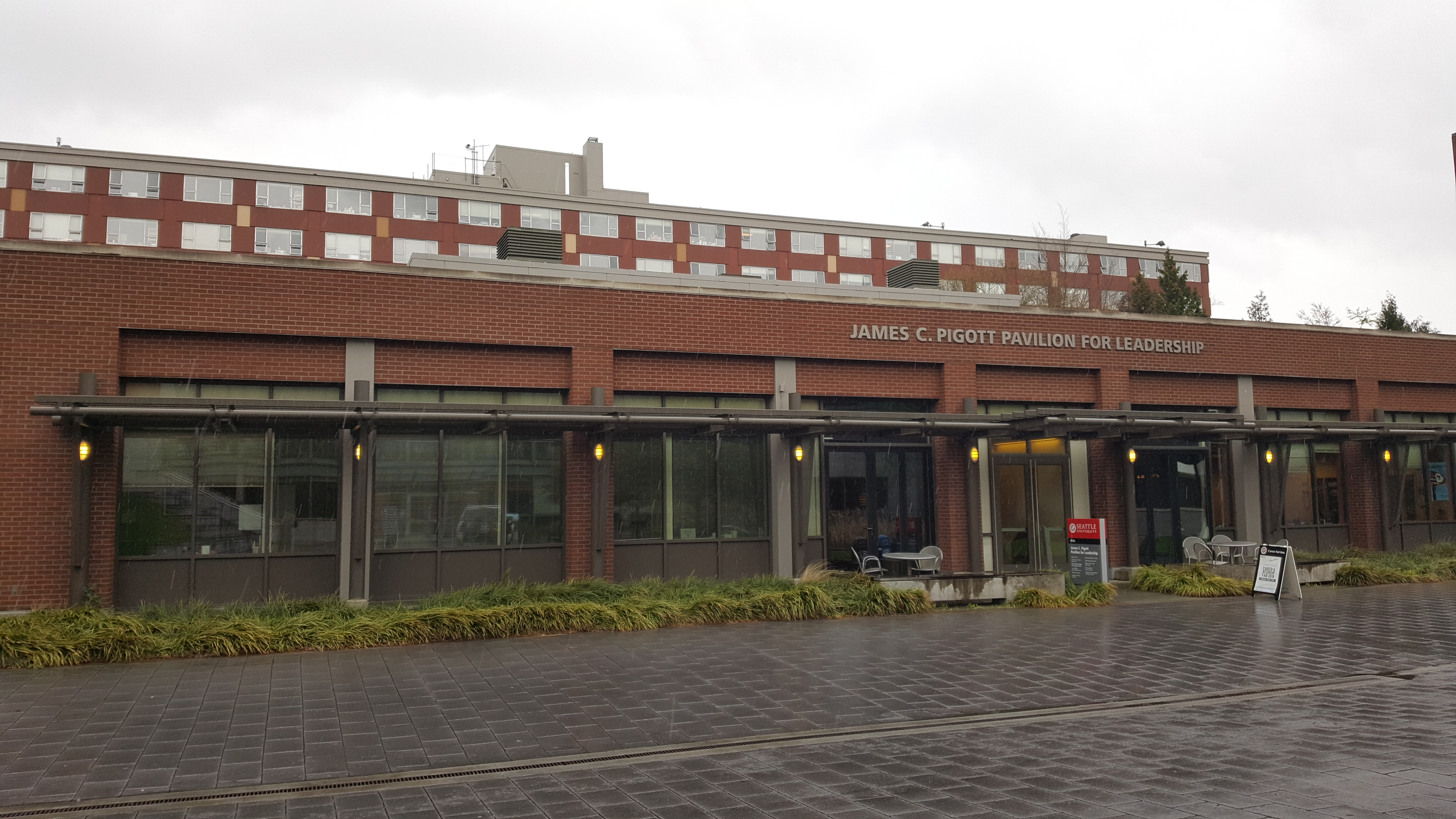
Bellarmine Hall and the attached Pigott Pavilion.

==== Bellarmine Hall ====
Bellarmine Hall (often referred to as Bell) is primarily for first-year and some sophomore students. It is the most centrally located dorm on campus and houses around 400 students in dormitory-style housing with most rooms having two beds and some sleeping three. It is attached to the Pigott Pavilion which provides some student services including career counselling, counselling and psychological services (CAPS) and the print shop SUperCopy.

==== Campion Hall ====
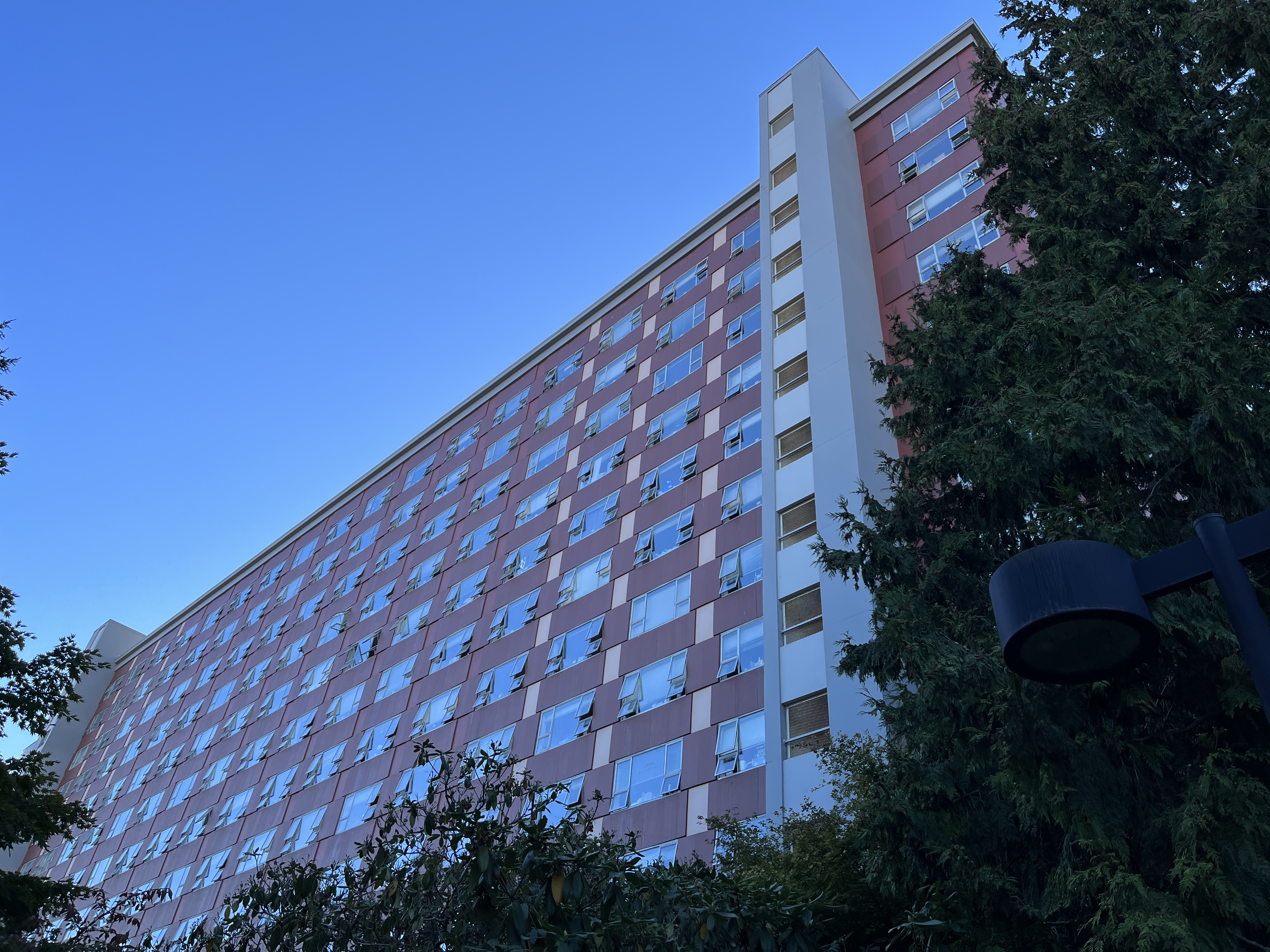
Campion Hall from the entry walkway.

Campion Hall (often referred to as Camp) is primarily for first-year and some sophomore students. It is the tallest building on campus at 12 stories tall and the largest dormitory on campus housing around 650 residents. It has a ballroom on the first floor which hosts many types of events such as the annual Lūʻau.

The basement has a school-run convenience store called The Cave, often open late, and used to be home to KXSU before the completion of the Sinegal Center. The top floor of Campion Hall is split in half with a dormitory on the northern wing of the building with the study rooms and computer lab overlooking downtown Seattle on the southern wing. It is also adjacent to Seattle U's Japanese Garden.

==== Chardin Hall ====
Chardin Hall was originally operated by Seattle U as the Bessie Burton Sullivan Skilled Nursing Residence from 1990-March 2007. The building was converted into classrooms and dorms for the following academic year. As a result of the building's past use, it is distinct from the other three residence halls with wider halls, greater wheelchair accessibility, and larger rooms. It houses the fewest students of the four residence halls with around 140 residents. It is also distinct from the other residence halls in that it is only open to second-year students.

==== Xavier Global House ====
Xavier Global House (often referred to as Xav) houses around 200 students and is primarily for first and second year international students. It is the only residence hall on the North end of campus.

==== Murphy Apartments ====
Named after Archbishop Thomas Joseph Murphy, the Murphy Apartments—commonly just called Murphy or the Murphy's—are a collection of apartment style resident halls primarily for upperclassmen and graduate students, although some sophomores are allowed to live there as well. They are broken into five separate buildings, the Peter Claver House (MACL), the Kateri Tekakwitha House (MATK), the Gerard Manley Hopkins House (MAHP), the Rutilio Grande House (MAGR), and the Dorothy Day House (MADY). The Dorothy Day House is exclusively for graduate and law students, while the Hopkins House contains the Hopkins lounge and laundry room for the entire Murphy Apartments.

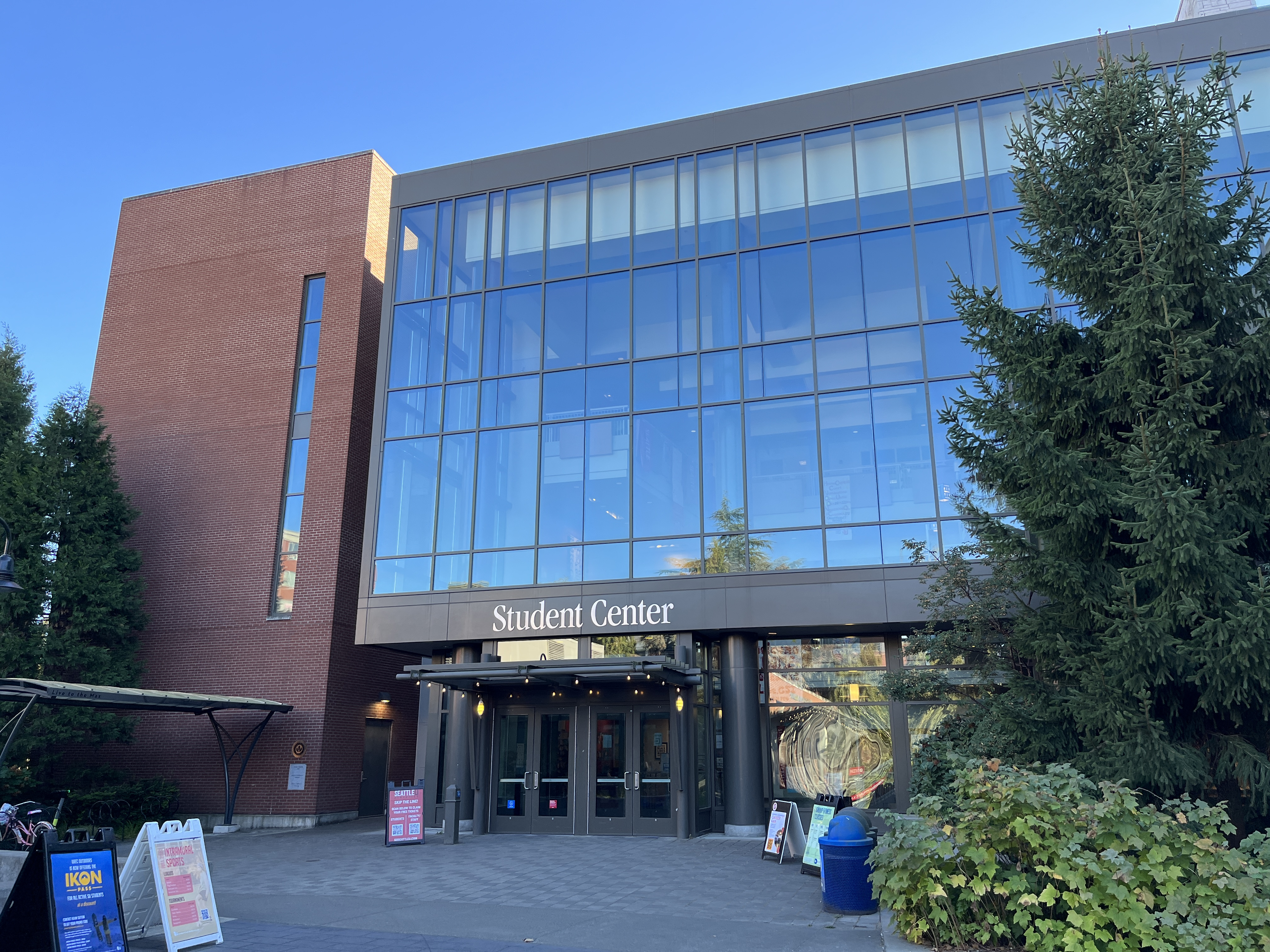
Student Center from the lower mall.

=== Student Center ===
The Student Center is home to the main dining hall on campus. It also houses Campus Ministry, the Wellness and Health Promotion Center, and the Esports room. The top floor has a pedestrian bridge that crosses where Cherry Street turns into James Street connecting the Student Center to the Murphy Apartments, Campion Hall, Chardin Hall, and Seattle University Park & Logan Field. Its main entrance is on the lower mall, but it also has a side entrance that connects to the Lemieux Library.

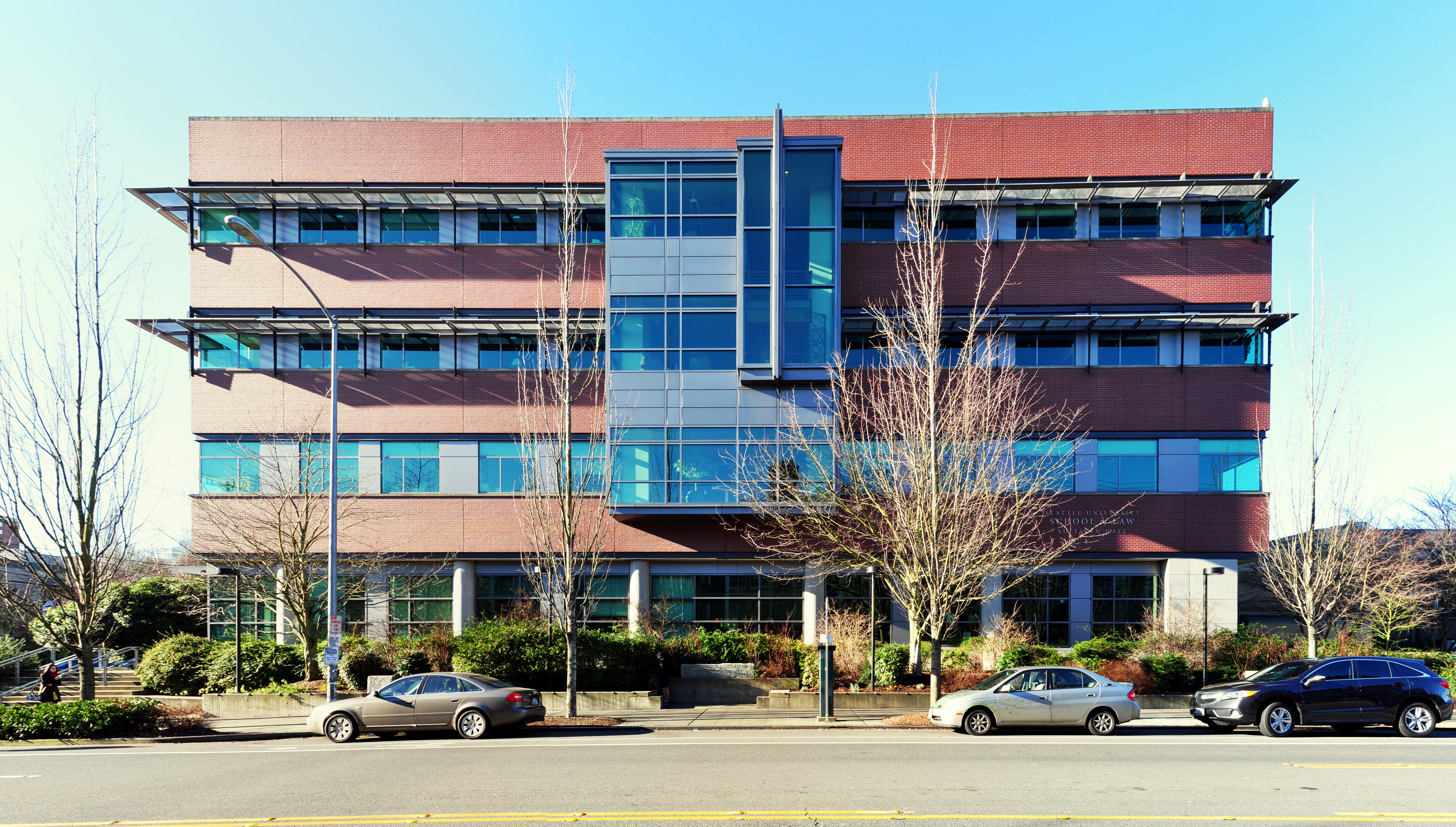
Sullivan Hall from across 12th Ave.

=== Sullivan Hall (Seattle University) ===
Sullivan Hall has housed the Seattle University School of Law since it was completed in 1999. It is located on the lower mall of campus between the Center for Science and Innovation and Bellarmine Hall. It also has an on-campus dining location called The Sidebar.

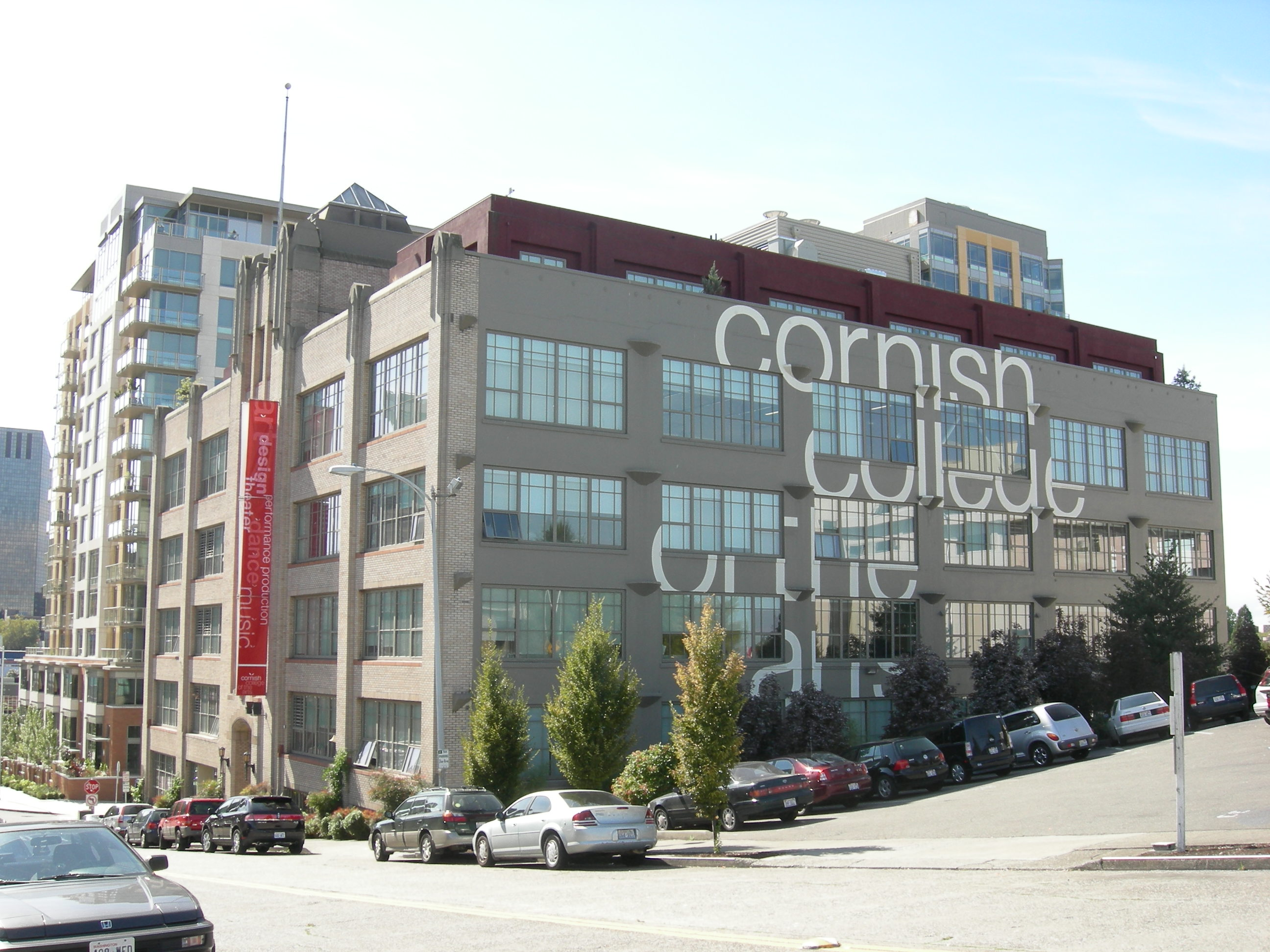
The William Volker Building is the primary building for Seattle U's Cornish Campus in South Lake Union

=== South Lake Union Campus ===
Seattle U's South Lake Union campus is the home of Cornish College of the Arts. The campus is home to the William Volker Building which is on the National Register of Historic Places, the Raisbeck Performance Hall which is a Seattle City Landmark, and Cornish's residence hall and Library.

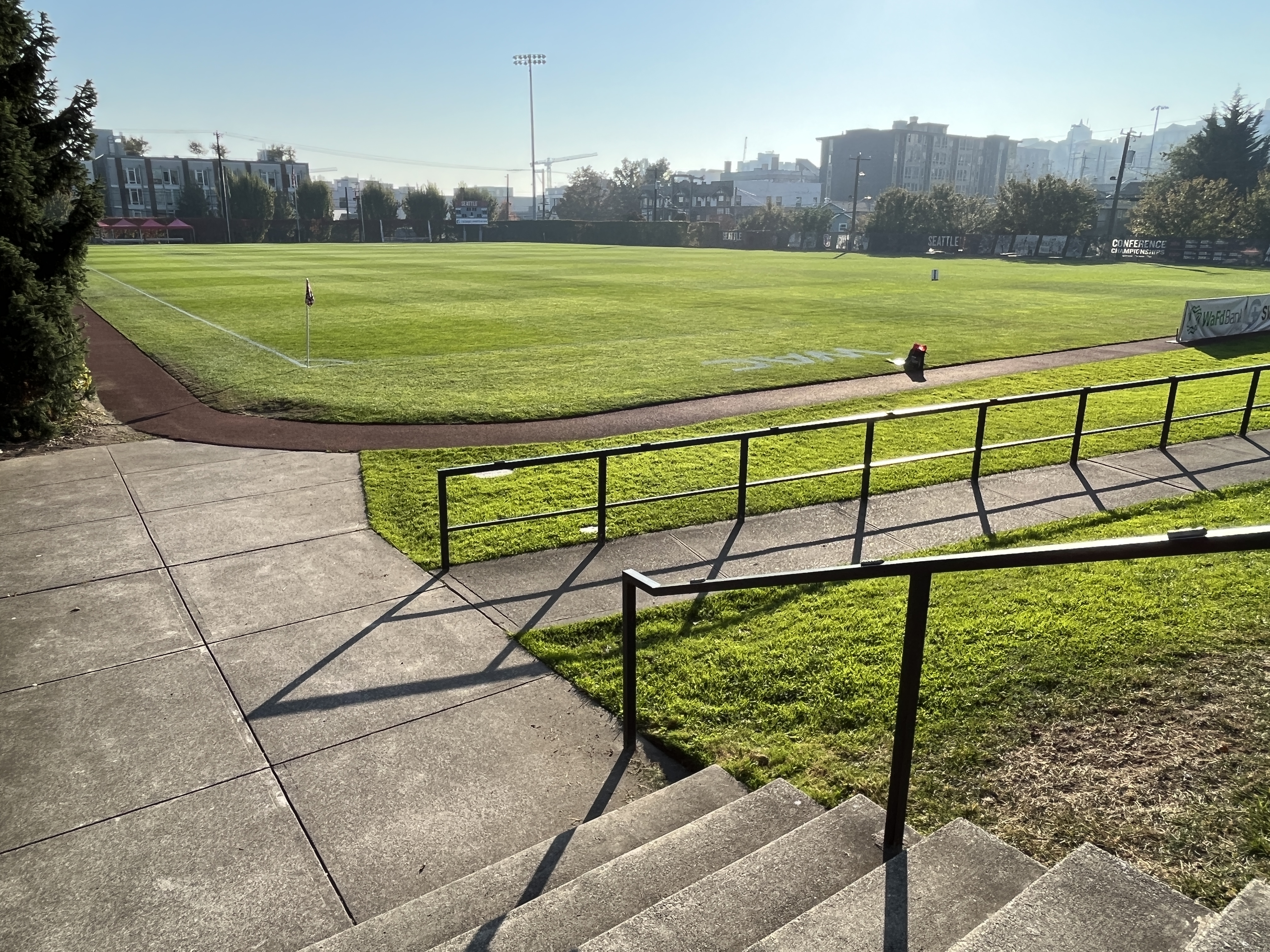
Championship Field from the NE Corner

=== Sports Facilities ===
The Redhawk Center is home to the school's largest arena and indoor court and hosts Basketball and Volleyball games and large events such as some Quadstock acts. It was renamed from the Connolly Center in May, 2018 following the news that the namesake, Archbishop Thomas Connolly had been involved in helping cover up the sex crimes of Father Michael Cody. The Redhawk Center also contains the fitness center, a gym open to all students. It is located on 14th Avenue on the edge of campus next to Championship Field and the school's Tennis Courts.

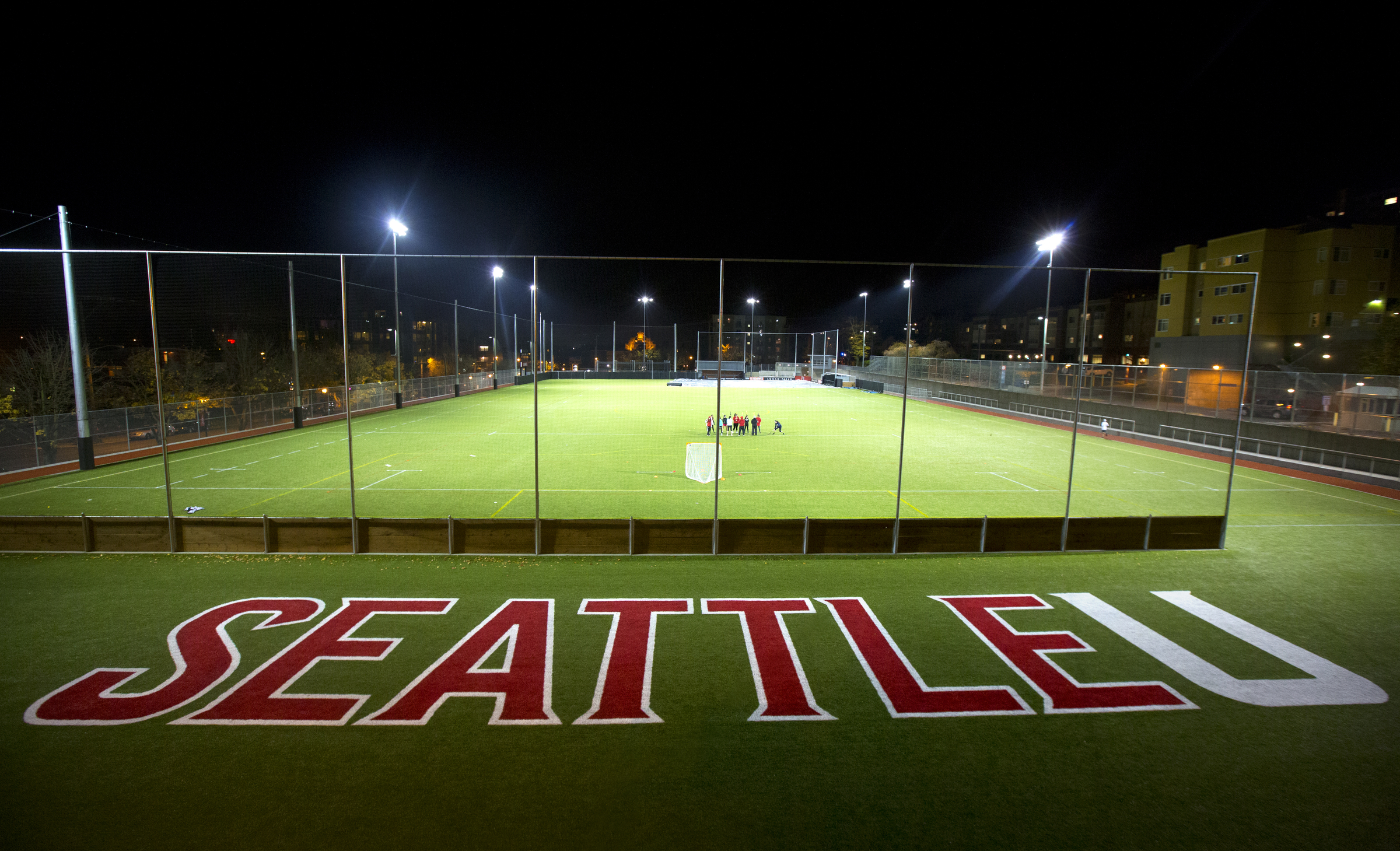
Seattle University Park at Night

The other main sports facility on campus is Seattle University Park & Logan Field, a small track and field stadium with a baseball diamond which is used as a multi-purpose venue for mostly small events such as intramural sports. It has a turf field with soccer markings painted on. The field is located along 12th Avenue near many of the student dormitories and is often used by students outside of structed activities.

Seattle Redhawks men's basketball hosts home games at both the Redhawk Center on campus and at Climate Pledge Arena in the Seattle Center.

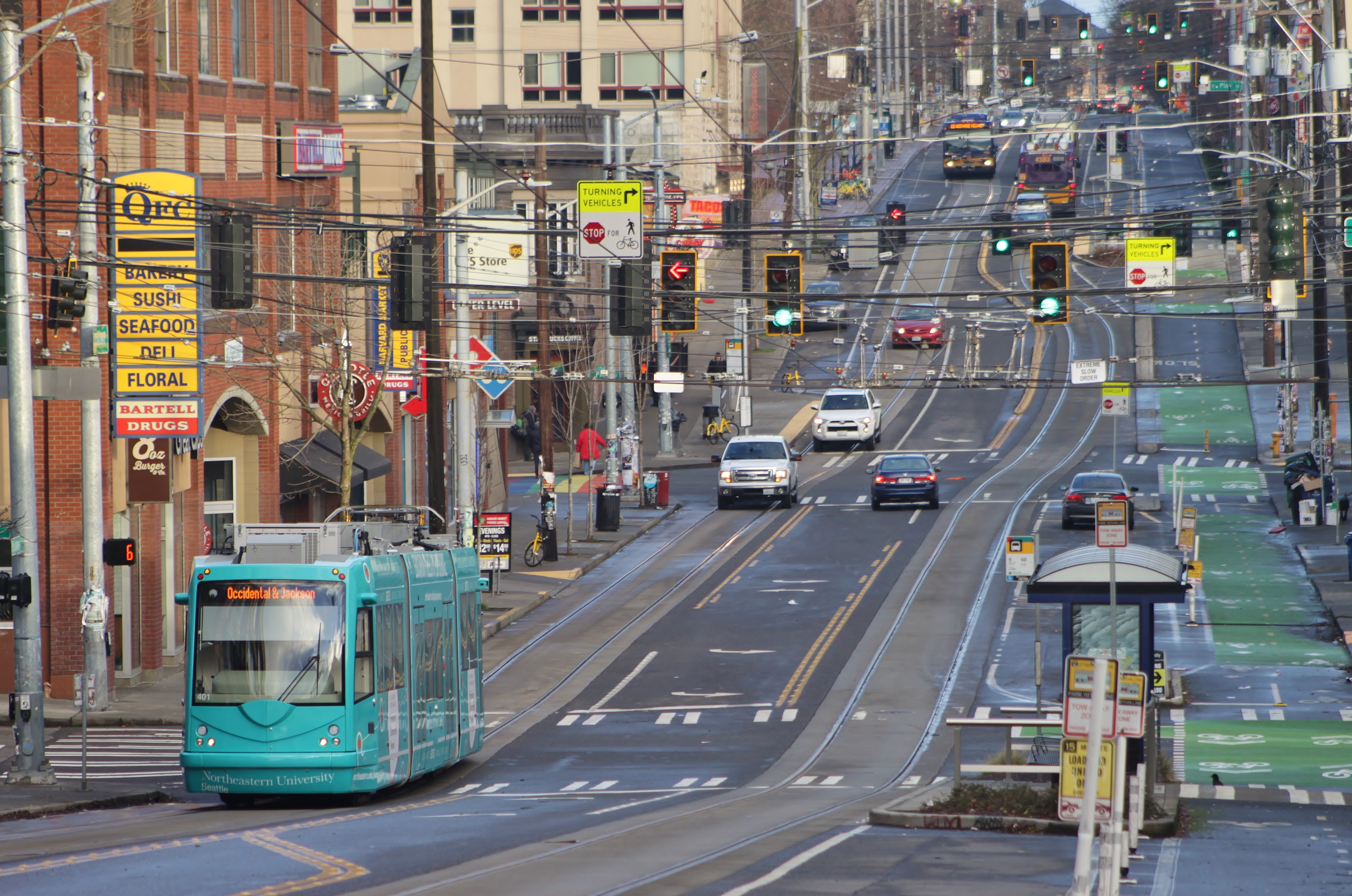
First Hill Streetcar and King County Metro bus on Broadway near Seattle U's First Hill Campus.

=== Transportation ===
Seattle U's First Hill campus is adjacent to the First Hill Streetcar and several King County Metro bus routes, including the RapidRide G Line. It is also near Capitol Hill station, which is served by the 1 Line of the Link light rail system. Bicycle lanes running along Broadway, Union, and 12th connect campus to Seattle's broader cycling network. Seattle U has four parking garages and lots on its campus.

The South Lake Union campus is served by the South Lake Union Streetcar and King County Metro buses. It is near Westlake station on the 1 Line, which is also served by the Seattle Center Monorail.

In 2025, Seattle U announced their intention to operate a shuttle bus service connecting the First Hill and South Lake Union campuses when Cornish and Seattle U merged.

== Academics ==
Academic rankings

National
- Forbes: 162
- U.S. News & World Report: 124
- Washington Monthly: 197
- WSJ/College Pulse: 113

Seattle University offers 70 bachelor's degree programs, 42 graduate degree programs, and 24 certificate programs, plus law school, a doctoral program in education, and a doctoral program in nursing practice (DNP). The university consists of seven schools and colleges: the College of Arts and Sciences, Cornish College of the Arts, the Albers School of Business and Economics, the College of Education, the School of Law, the College of Nursing, and the College of Science and Engineering. A Seattle University education is estimated to cost $150,000.

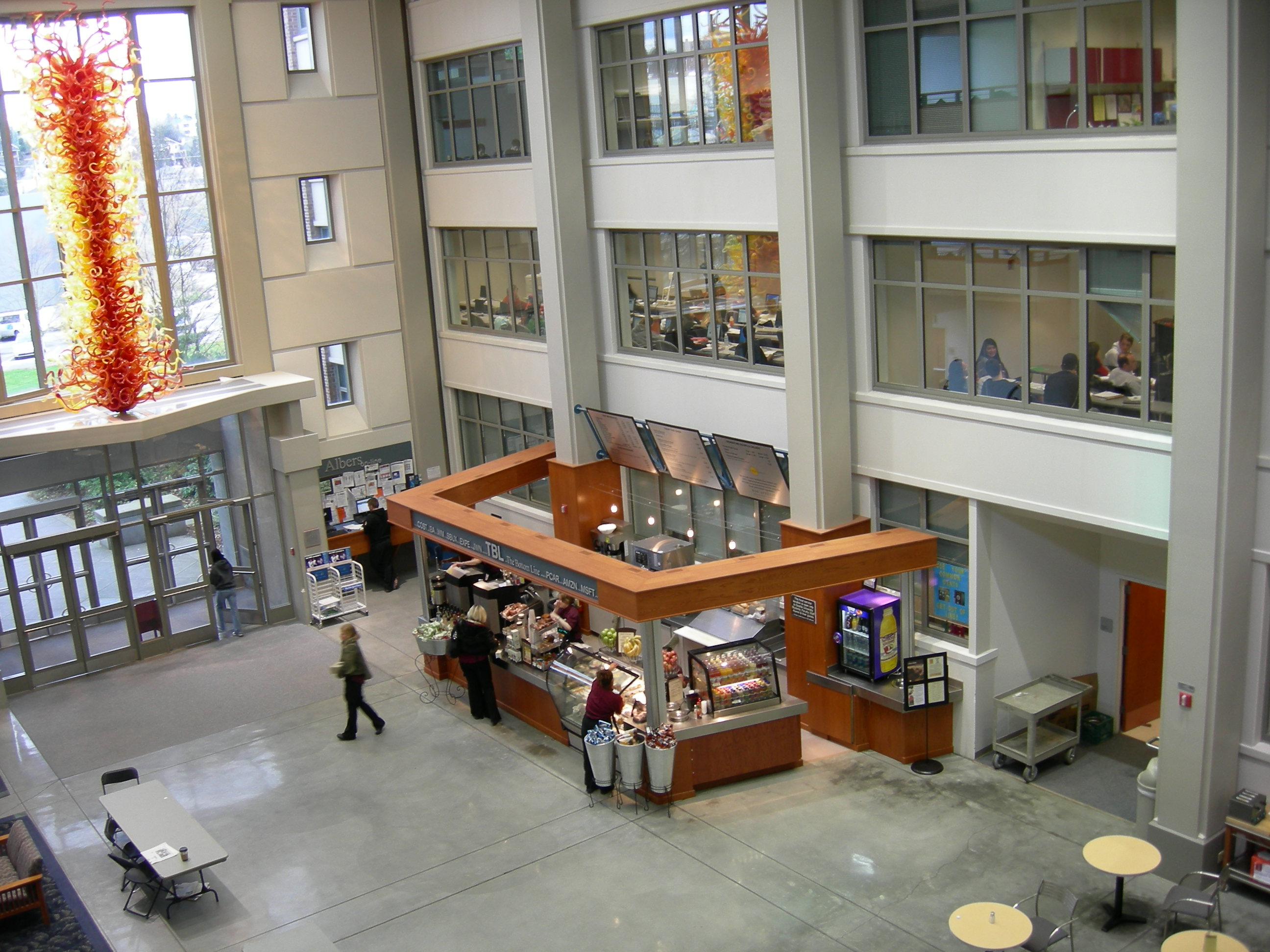
View of the interior atrium of Albers Hall - Home of Seattle U's Business School.

=== Albers School of Business and Economics ===
Seattle University's Albers School of Business and Economics, started in 1945, was named after the Albers family. George and Eva Albers were frequent donors including Eva's bequest of $3 million to the school in 1971. Their daughter, alumna Genevieve Albers, has also made several bequests including a sponsored professorship. In 1967, the business school added an MBA program. The Albers School is accredited with the Association to Advance Collegiate Schools of Business (AACSB).

=== College of Arts and Sciences ===
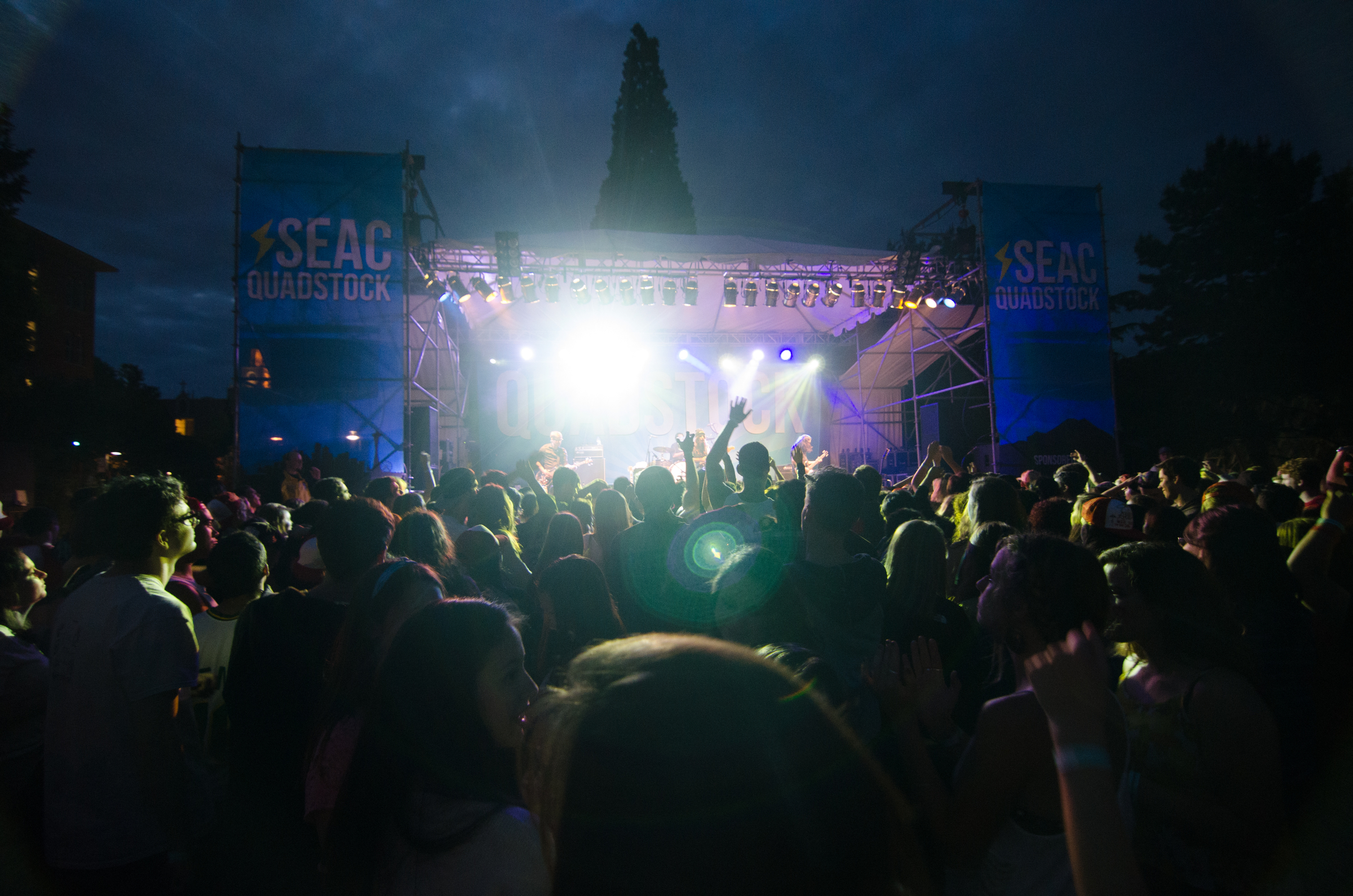
Music festival (2014) at Seattle U., including Macklemore, Schoolboy Q, Sea Wolf, Best Coast, and Brother Ali

Seattle University College of Arts and Sciences in Seattle, Washington, is the oldest undergraduate and graduate college affiliated with Seattle University. The College offers 33 undergraduates majors, 28 undergraduates minors, 10 graduate degrees, and 4 post-graduate certificates to more than 2,000 students. Its graduate program in psychology is one of the few schools in the country to focus on existential phenomenology as a therapeutic method.

=== Cornish College of the Arts ===
Cornish College of the Arts was founded as a private art college in 1914 and operated independently until it was acquired by Seattle University in May 2025. It continues to operate primarily on its South Lake Union campus and offers 12 undergraduate majors and 46 concentrations in various studies of the fine arts.

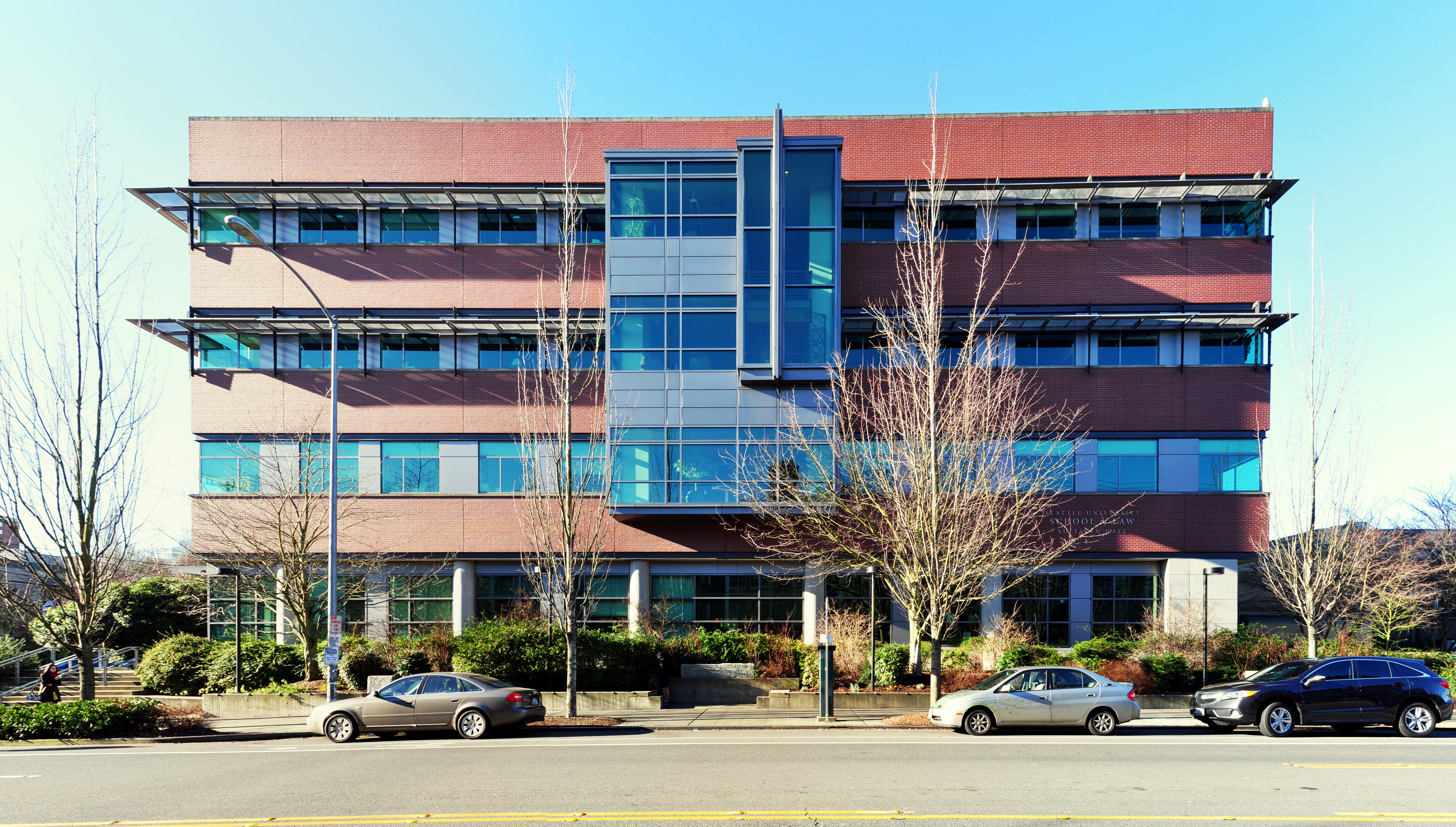
Sullivan Hall - Home of Seattle U's Law School

=== School of Law ===
Seattle University School of Law was founded in 1972 as part of the University of Puget Sound (UPS) in Tacoma, Washington. In 1993 the University of Puget Sound and Seattle University agreed on a transfer of the law school to Seattle University; in August 1994 the transfer was completed and the school physically moved to Sullivan Hall on the Seattle University campus in 1999. The 2019 U.S. News & World Report Law School rankings list the school at number 122 in the nation overall, adding that the school has the number one legal writing program in the nation as well as top-20 rankings for its part-time program and its clinical programs.

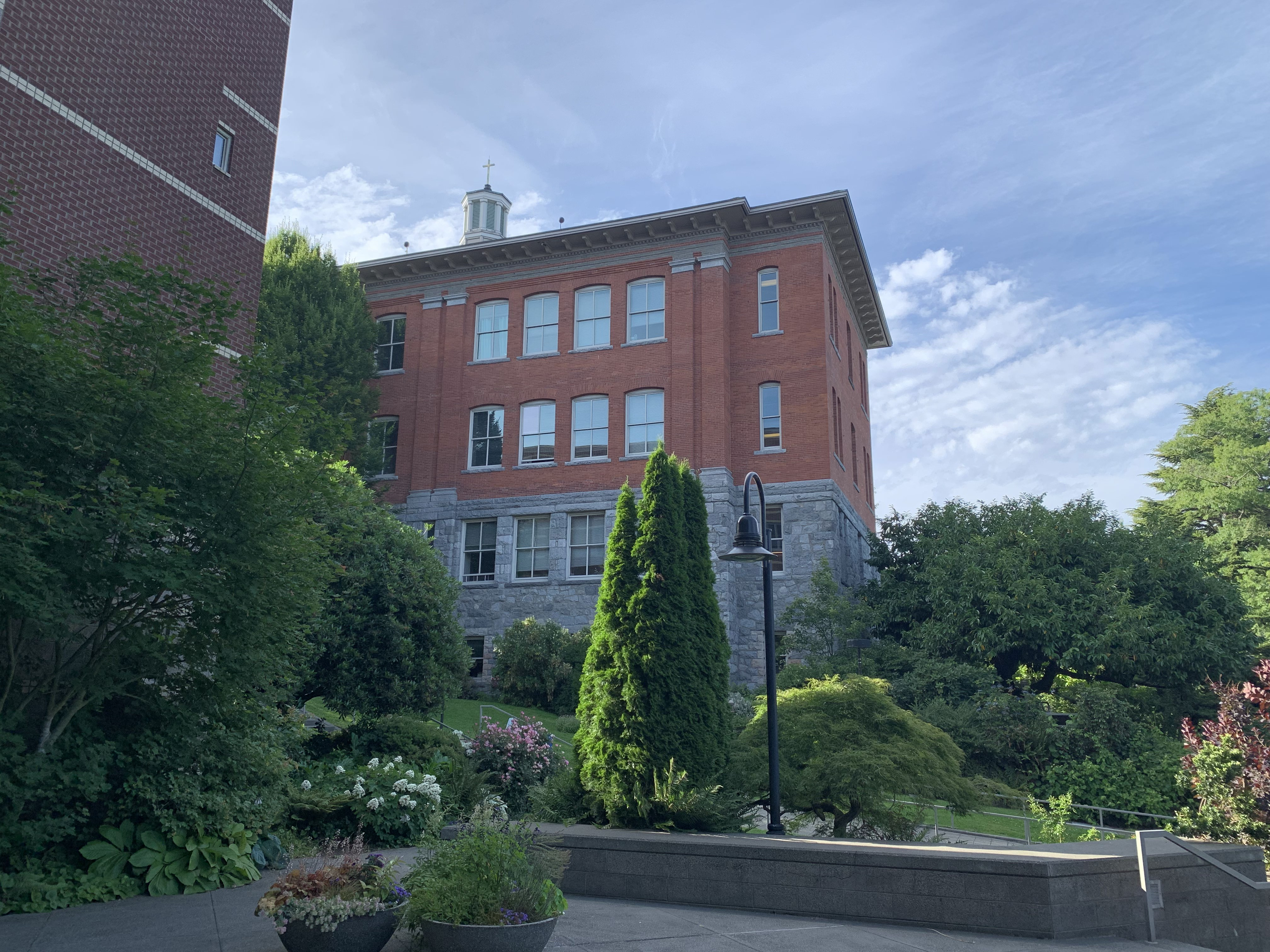
Garrand Building - Home of Seattle U's Nursing Program

=== College of Nursing ===
Seattle University's College of Nursing was founded in 1935. It is housed in the renovated Garrand Hall, the site of the original Seattle College and the oldest building on campus. The 19,000-square-foot (1,800 m^{2}) "state of the art" Clinical Performance Lab is located in the James Tower of Swedish on Cherry Hill, a few blocks away from the main campus. Undergraduate and graduate students use this lab to practice skills necessary for clinical nursing. The BSN and BS in Diagnostic Ultrasound programs accept transfer students from community colleges and other universities. The DNP program welcomes registered nurses with bachelor's degrees. The Advanced Practice Nursing Immersion program (APNI to DNP) offers an accelerated program for those with a bachelor's degree in another field.

=== College of Education ===
The College of Education was founded in 1935. Its counseling program was the first to be accredited by the Council for Accreditation of Counseling and Related Educational Programs in the Seattle area and school psychology program is accredited by the National Association of School Psychologists and approved by the National Association of School Psychologists.

=== College of Science & Engineering ===
The College of Science and Engineering focuses on basic sciences, mathematics, and their applications. Students can major in basic science disciplines, computer science, or one of the engineering courses – civil and environmental engineering, mechanical engineering, or computer and electrical engineering. Students may also obtain an interdisciplinary general science degree, or prepare for graduate work in the health professions.

== Environmental sustainability ==
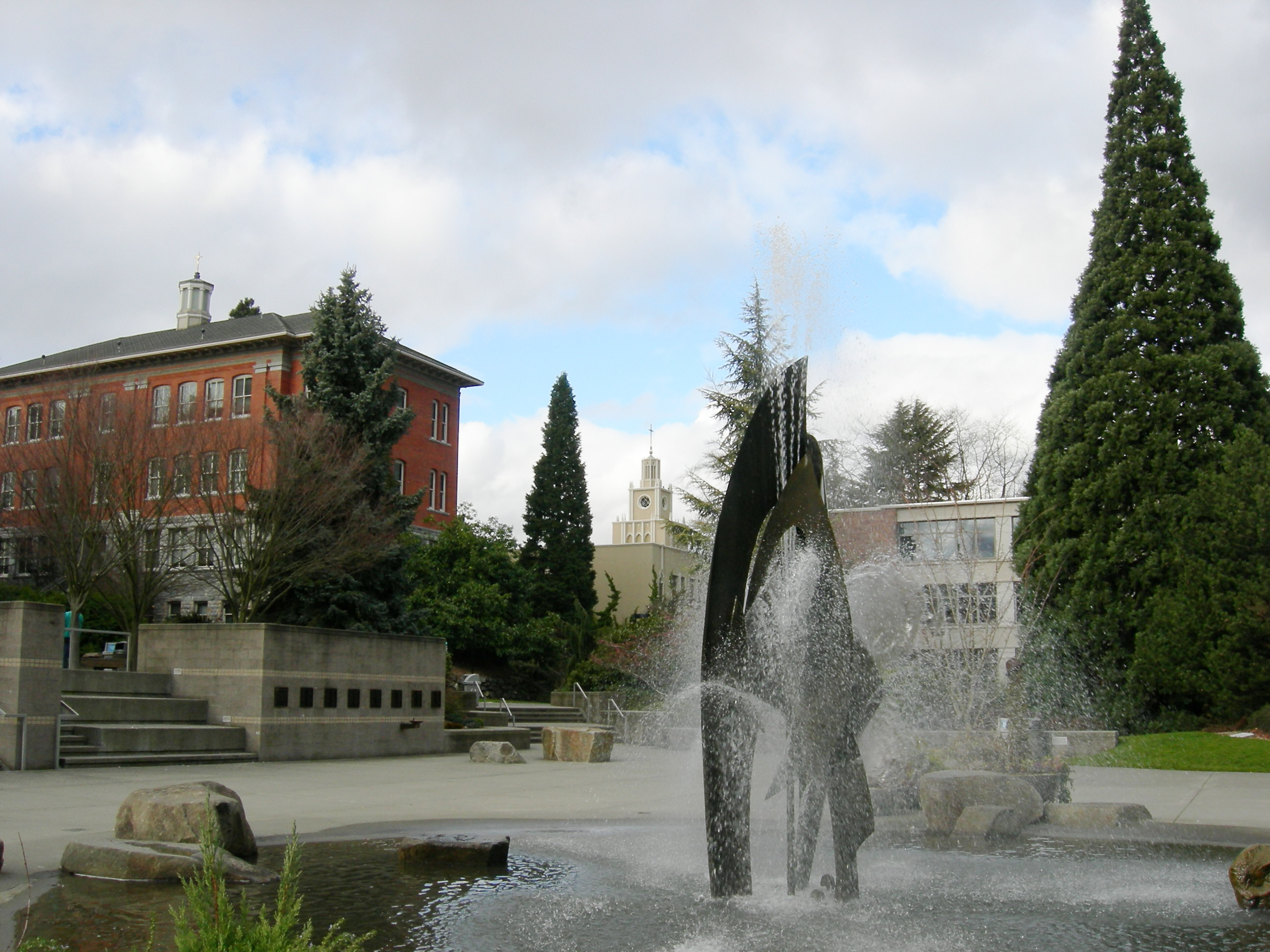
Centennial Fountain with Garrand Hall (School of Nursing), Administration Building, Piggot Hall (Albers School of Business)

Among Seattle University's many environmental undertakings are projects ranging from composting initiatives to water conservation. There are also solar panels on buildings and a central recycling yard with an extensive recycling program. The university has been composting since 1995, and in 2003 it built the first composting facility in the state on an urban campus. The campus is home to 5 LEED Gold Certified buildings.

Seattle University received the Sustainability Innovator Award in 2007 from the Sustainable Endowments Institute for its pre-consumer food waste composting program and the Green Washington Award in 2008 from Washington CEO Magazine for its sustainable landscape practices and pre-consumer food waste composting program. The Princeton Review's 2018 Green Rating rated the school as the #12 Green College in the country.

Seattle U's move to a pesticide-free campus began in the early 1980s when Ciscoe Morris, now a local gardening personage, was head of the grounds department. He put a halt to chemical spraying and in its place released more than 20,000 beneficial insects called lacewings to eat the aphids that had infested trees on campus. The success of this led to other pesticide-free gardening practices.

In 2023, Seattle University became the first university in Washington state and the first Jesuit university to fully divest its endowment portfolio from fossil fuels.

== Athletics ==
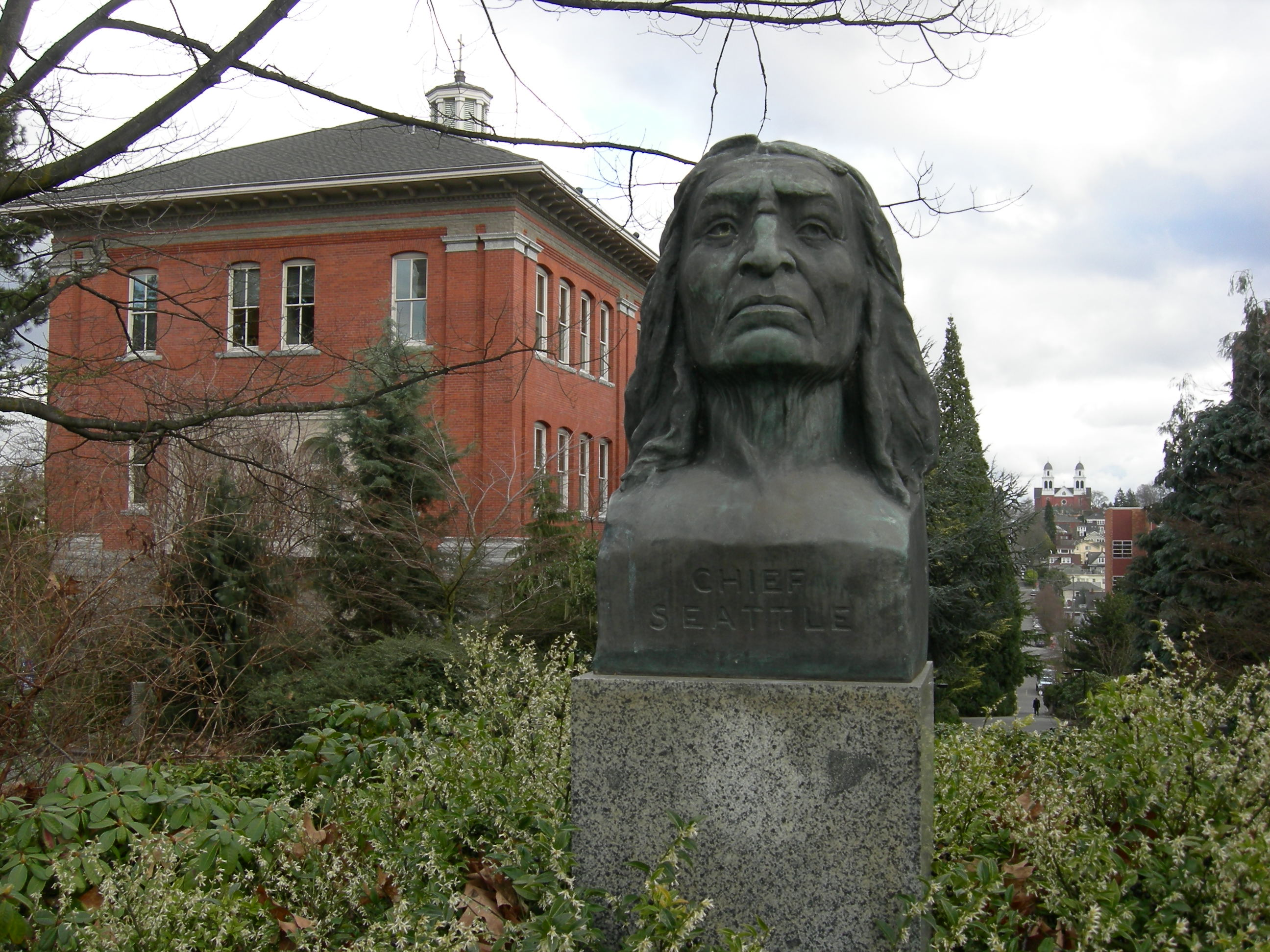
Chief Seattle (Noah Sealth)

Between 1950 and 1971, Seattle University competed as a Division I independent school. In the 1950s, the basketball team was a powerhouse with brothers Johnny and Eddie O'Brien, who led the team to a rare victory over the Harlem Globetrotters. In 1958, future Basketball Hall of Famer Elgin Baylor paced a men's basketball team that advanced to the Final Four and defeated top-ranked Kansas State University before losing to the University of Kentucky. Seattle University was also a leader in the area of racial diversity, with an integrated squad known as "the United Nations team."

The success of men's basketball, in addition to men's golf and baseball, continued into the 1960s with players Eddie Miles, Clint Richardson, and Tom Workman who went on to successful careers in the NBA. The 1966 basketball squad gave Texas Western University its only defeat in a championship season celebrated in the film Glory Road.

During that time women's tennis star Janet Hopps Adkisson was the first female to be the top-ranked player for both the men and women nationally. In women's golf, Pat Lesser was twice named to the Curtis Cup in the mid-1950s and was later inducted into the State of Washington Sports Hall of Fame.

Before 1980, more than 25 Seattle University baseball players went on to play professionally in both the major and minor leagues. Men's golf and a Tom Gorman-led tennis team were also rated nationally. Gorman went on to lead the US Davis Cup team, where he captained a record 18 match wins and one Davis Cup title (1972) as a player and two more Davis Cup championships as a coach (1990 and 1992).

Seattle University joined the West Coast Conference in 1971. In 1980, it left the West Coast Conference and Division I membership and entered the NAIA, where it remained for nearly 20 years. In the late 1990s, President Fr. Sundborg started restoring the university's NCAA membership. The athletic program moved into Division II in the fall of 2002.

The school moved from Division II to Division I in 2009. Also in that year, the university hired men's basketball coach Cameron Dollar, a former assistant at the University of Washington, and women's coach Joan Bonvicini, former University of Arizona coach and one of the winningest women's college basketball coaches. In 2013, Coach Bonvicini led the Redhawks to the regular season Western Athletic Conference championship. In 2016, Suzy Barcomb was hired as the new coach for women's basketball after Coach Bonvicini resigned in March 2016. In her first season with Seattle U, Coach Barcomb led the Redhawks to a WAC tournament title and was the 15th seed in the NCAA Tournament where Seattle University faced the second seed, Oregon Ducks.

In 1938, the mascot switched from the Maroons to the Chieftains. The name was selected to honor the school's city's namesake, Chief Seattle. In 2000, the university changed its mascot to the Redhawks.

On June 14, 2011, Seattle University accepted an invitation to join the Western Athletic Conference, becoming a full member for the 2012–2013 season.

In May 2024, Seattle University announced its intention to rejoin the West Coast Conference for the 2025-26 season after a 45 year absence. When the announcement was made, it was expected that they would be joining the conference along with rival Grand Canyon University from the WAC while also having the opportunity to reignite a rivalry with Gonzaga, the other Jesuit University in Washington State. However, spurred on by the collapse of the PAC-12 and the resulting conference realignment, Gonzaga announced their intention to leave the WCC for the PAC-12 and GCU declined the invitation to join the WCC and instead announced their intention to move to the Mountain West Conference.

== KXSU-LP student-run radio ==
KXSU-LP (102.1 FM) is a low-power student-run radio station based on the Seattle University campus. Licensed by the Federal Communications Commission (FCC) in 2016, the station began broadcasting as a campus-only operation in 1994 using the call sign KSUB and later it added internet service. Though it has an effective radiated power of just 7 watts, KXSU's primary and secondary coverage areas include the entire city and its immediate suburbs.

KXSU's air staff consists primarily of students but also includes faculty and alumni. According to the university, the station gives students the opportunity to gain hands-on experience in writing, reporting, and broadcasting.

== See also ==
- List of Jesuit educational institutions
- List of colleges and universities in Washington
