= Lemieux Library and McGoldrick Learning Commons =

Building in Seattle, Washington, U.S.

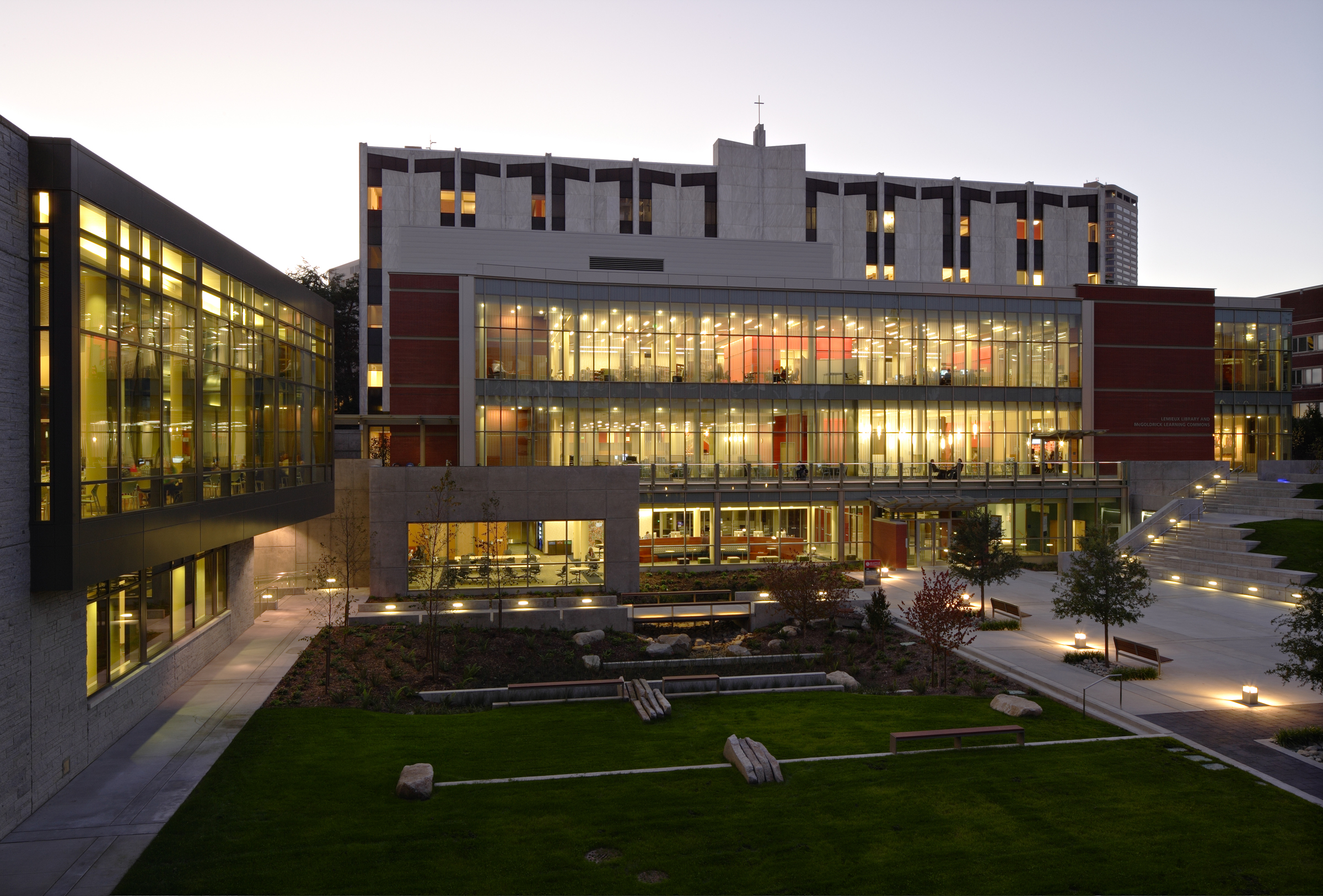
- The building's exterior, 2010
- 47°36′32″N 122°19′7″W
- Location: United States

The Lemieux Library and McGoldrick Learning Commons is a building on the Seattle University campus, in the U.S. state of Washington. Designed by Pfeiffer, the LEED Gold-certified building was completed in 2010.
