= Bannan Center =

Building complex in Seattle, Washington, U.S.

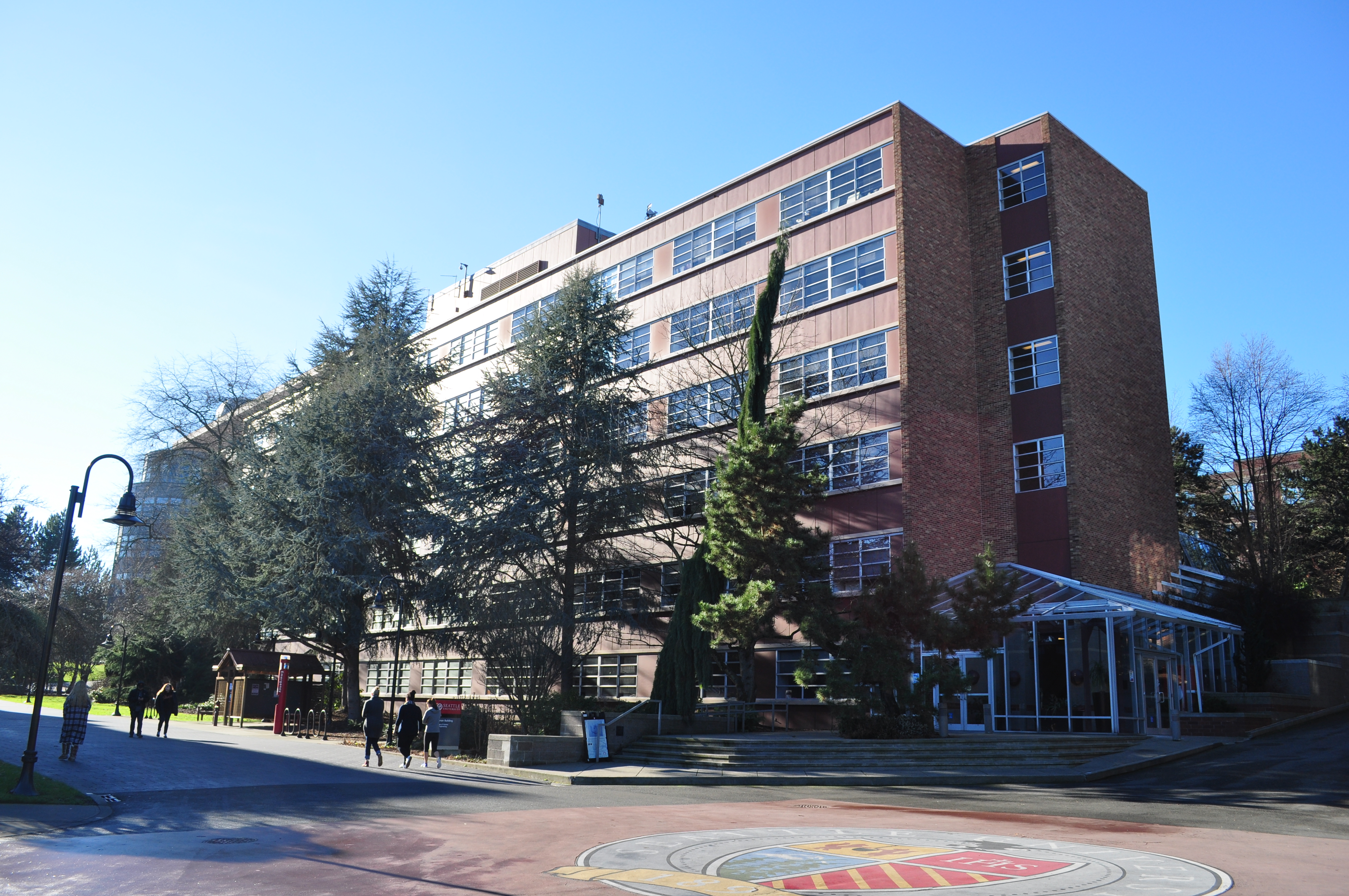
- View from the northeast, 2016
- Interactive map of the Bannan Center area

General information
- Coordinates: 47°36′34.5″N 122°19′6.5″W

The Thomas J. Bannan Center for Science and Engineering, or simply Bannan Center, is a building complex on the Seattle University campus, in the U.S. state of Washington. The building has separate wings for engineering and science. Previously, the two fields were housed in separate buildings called the Engineering Building and the Thomas J. Bannan Center, which have since been joined.

The building houses Bannan Auditorium and Wyckoff Auditorium.

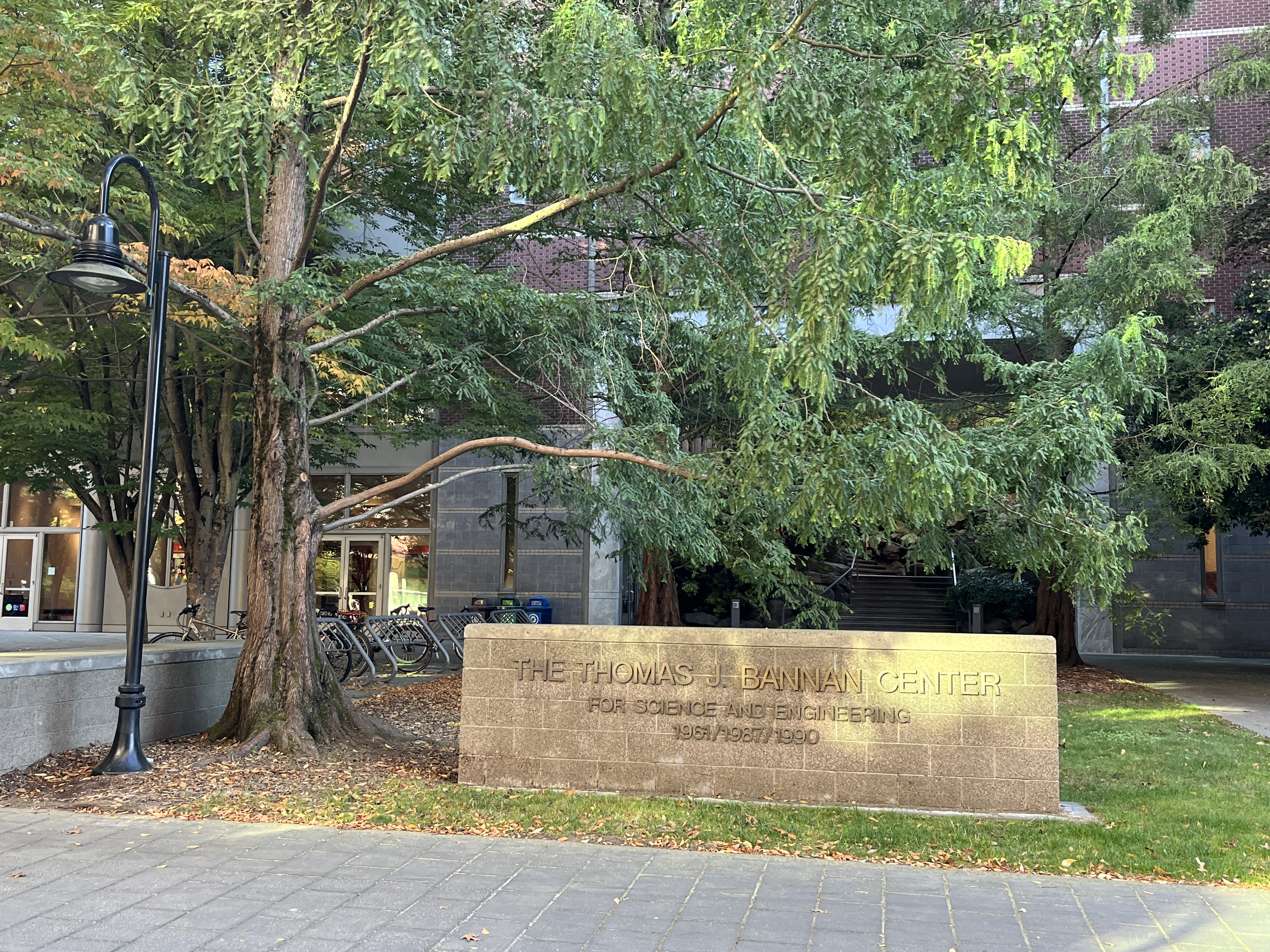
Exterior sign

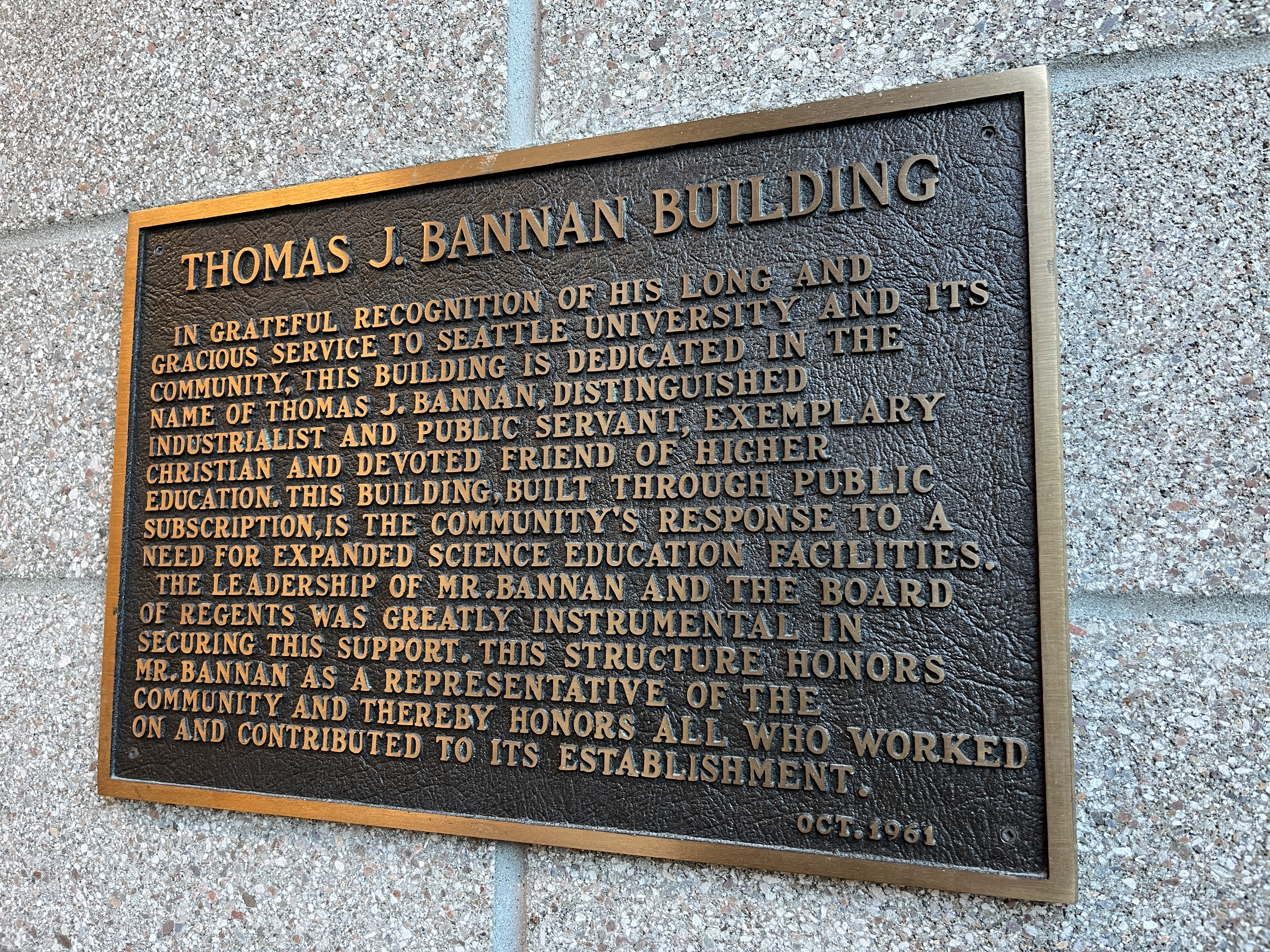
Plaque for the Thomas J. Bannan Building

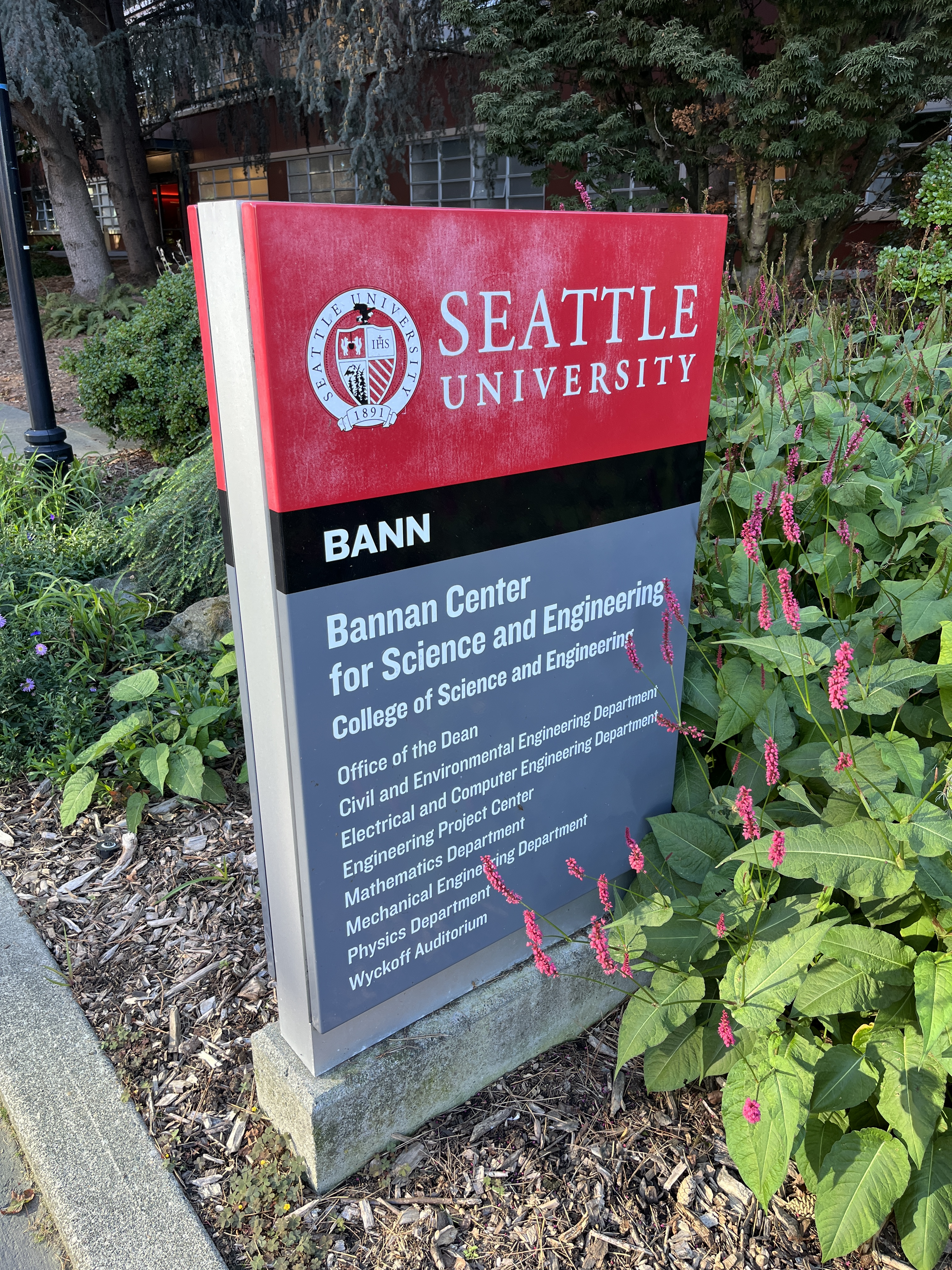
Sign for the Bannan Center for Science and Engineering
