= Ciscoe Morris =

Gardening Expert

James A. "Ciscoe" Morris is an American gardening expert, TV and radio personality, and author based in Seattle. He is known locally for his TV and radio programs "Gardening with Ciscoe," as well as his enthusiastic demeanor and catchphrase "Oh la la!" Previously, he wrote articles about gardening for the Seattle Post-Intelligencer before it ceased print operations and in The Seattle Times before leaving to focus on his next book.

== Biography ==
Ciscoe Morris was born in Wauwatosa, Wisconsin, to Robert Graham Morris (1909 - 2002) an Insurance Salesman and purported vaudeville performer, and Sarah A. "Sally" Reichhardt (1917 - 2014). He began gardening with his mother and grandmother and by age 10, was working professionally as a gardener for a local church. In 1972, he hitchhiked to Seattle and began working on a fishing boat. He later got a job at Seattle City Light in Newhalem and studied horticulture at South Seattle Community College.

In 1980, Morris began working at Seattle University where he introduced the use of beneficial insects rather than pesticides. Morris' media career began in the 1980s by filling-in as the host of a gardening question-and-answer radio show on KIRO after joining radio host Jim French on his show. Later that decade his TV career took-off on the KIRO-TV program "Northwest Home and Garden Show", hosted by Jeff Probst. In 2017, clips of Morris were featured in a segment on Last Week Tonight with John Oliver titled "You wish you loved anything as much as Seattle gardening expert Ciscoe Morris loves everything."

== Published works ==
- Ask Ciscoe: Oh, la, la ! Your Gardening Questions Answered. Seattle: Sasquatch Books (2006). ISBN 1570614326
- Oh, La La! Homegrown Stories, Helpful Tips, and Garden Wisdom. Seattle: Sasquatch Books (2020). ISBN 9781632172792
