= Fine Arts Building =

Fine Arts Building may refer to:

- Fine Arts Building (Los Angeles), a.k.a. The Standard Oil Building, in Los Angeles, California
- Fine Arts Building (Chicago), Illinois, a.k.a. The Studebaker Building, listed on the National Register of Historic Places in Chicago, Illinois
- A demolished theater on Grand Park Centre, Detroit, Michigan
- Exhibitors Building (Grand Rapids, Michigan) (formerly Fine Arts Building), listed on the National Register of Historic Places in Kent County, Michigan
- American Fine Arts Building, Manhattan, New York
- Fine Arts Building (Heidelberg University), formerly listed on the National Register of Historic Places in Seneca County, Ohio
- Frick Fine Arts Building, at the University of Pittsburgh, in Pittsburgh, Pennsylvania
- Fine Arts Building, a.k.a. President's House, a former building on the Queens Campus of Rutgers University
- Fine Arts Building (Seattle University), Washington, U.S.
