= Fine Arts Building (Seattle University) =

Building in Seattle, Washington, U.S.

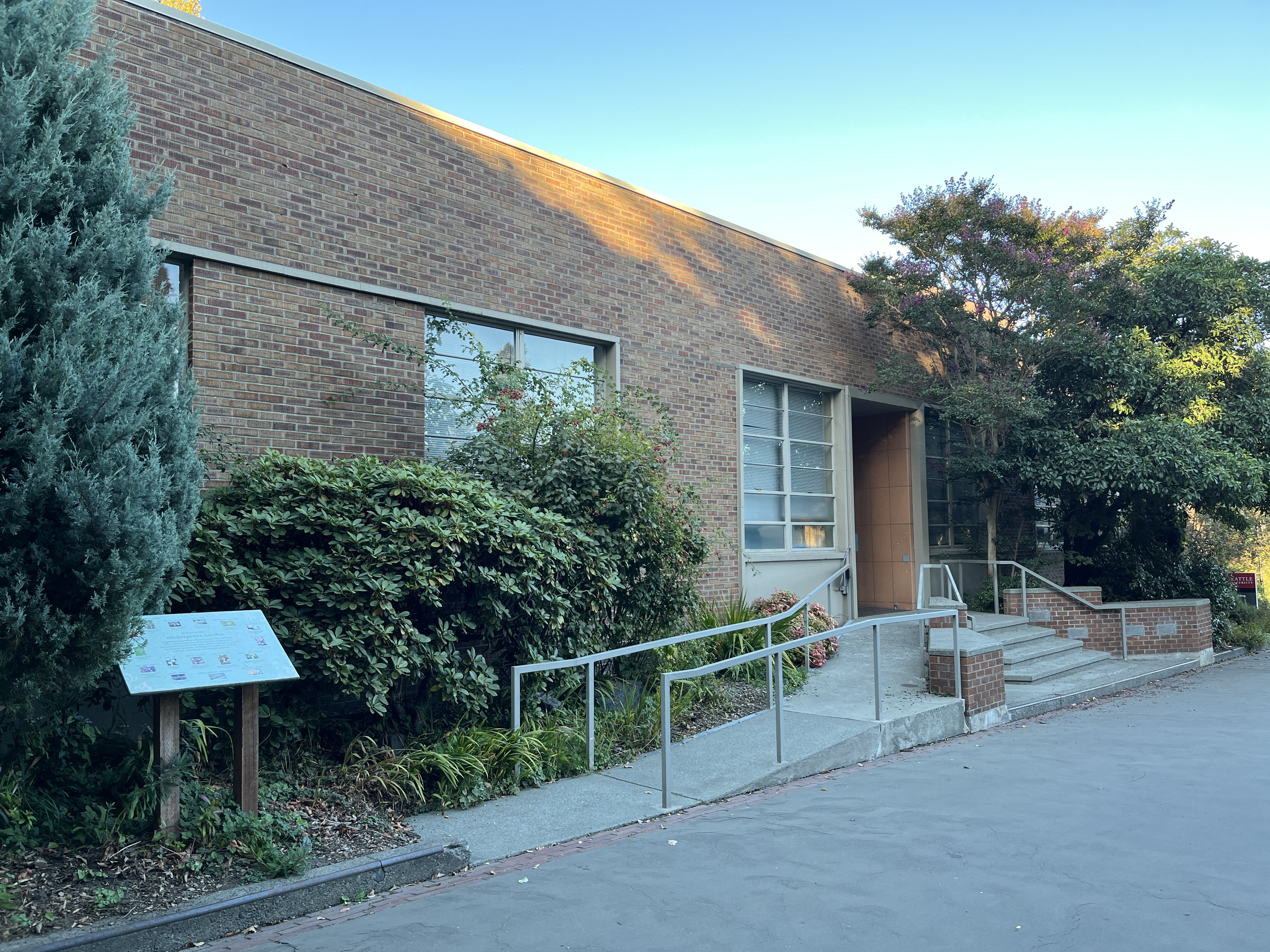
- The building's exterior, 2022
- Interactive map of the Fine Arts Building area

General information
- Location: Seattle, Washington, United States
- Coordinates: 47°36′42″N 122°19′8″W

The Fine Arts Building is a building on the Seattle University campus, in the U.S. state of Washington. The building houses the Vachon Gallery.

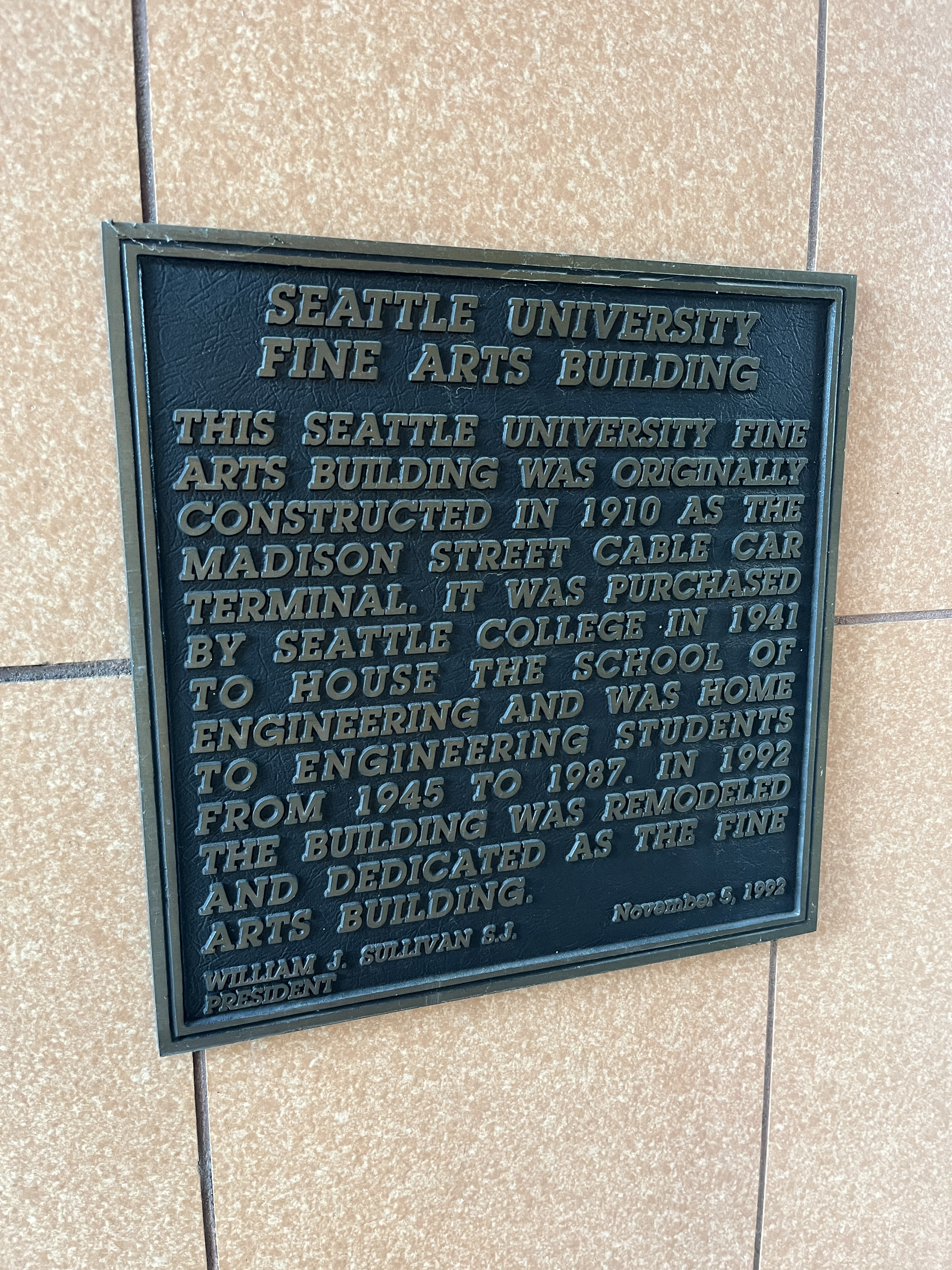
Plaque

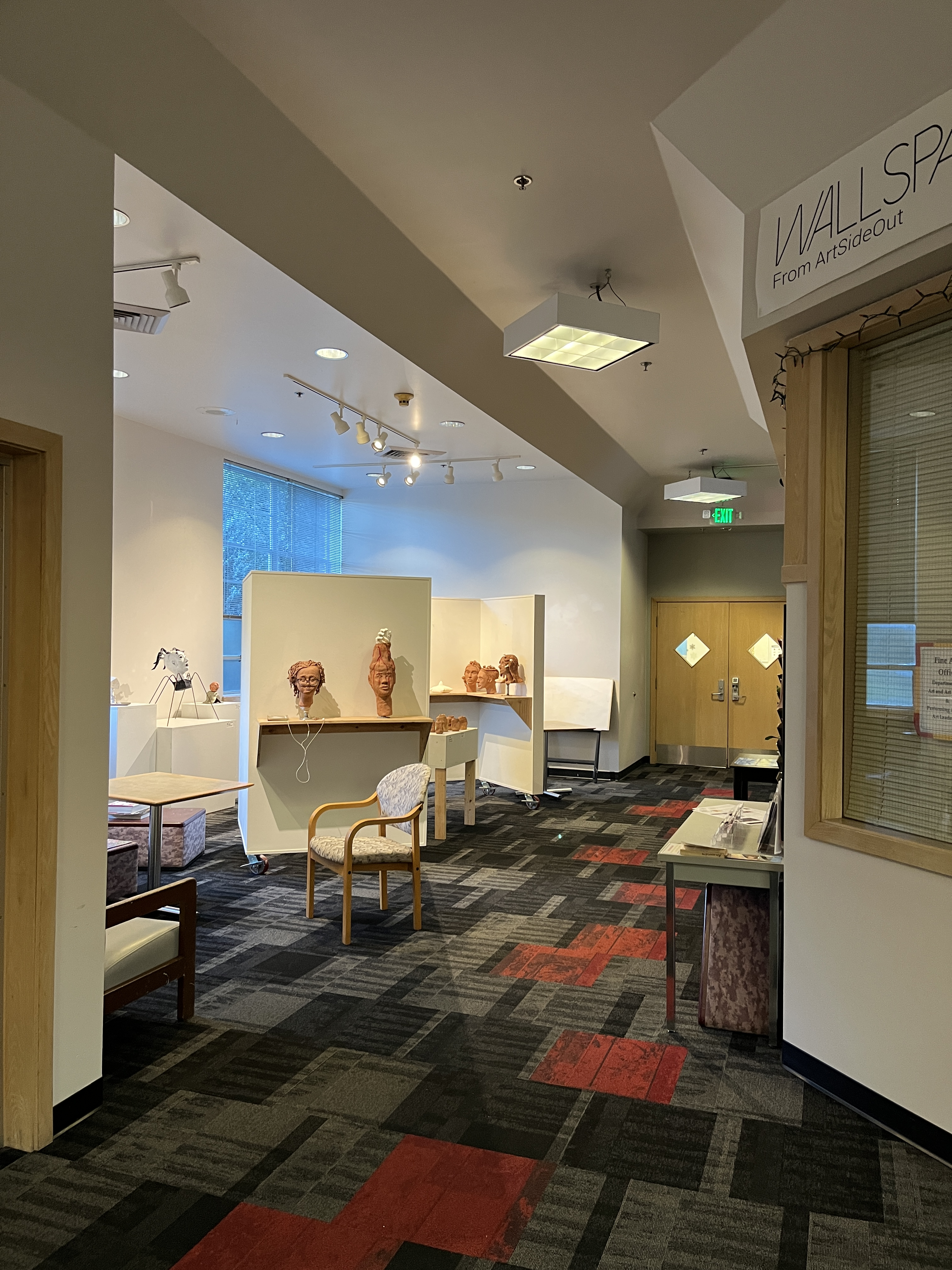
Interior

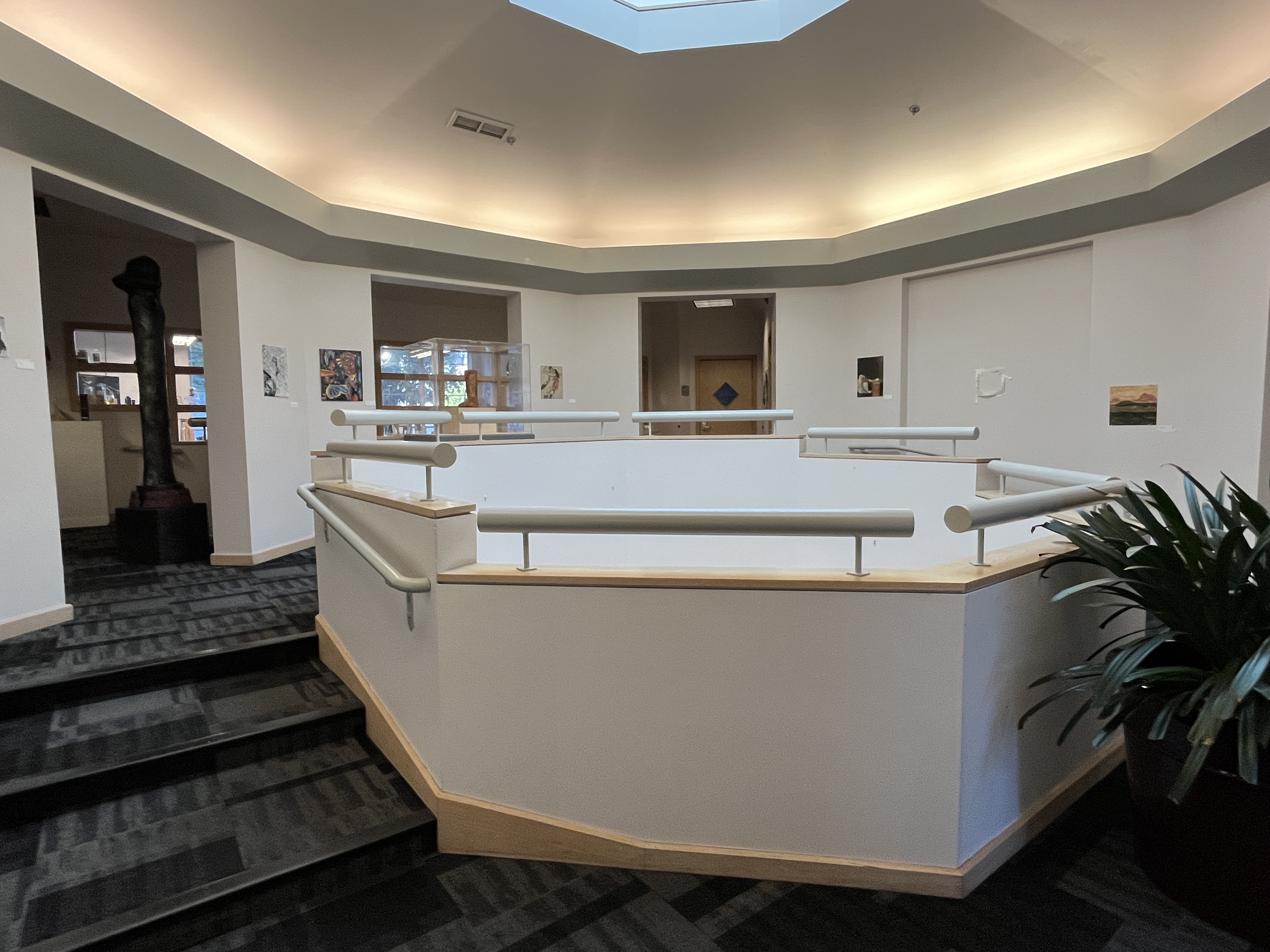
Interior

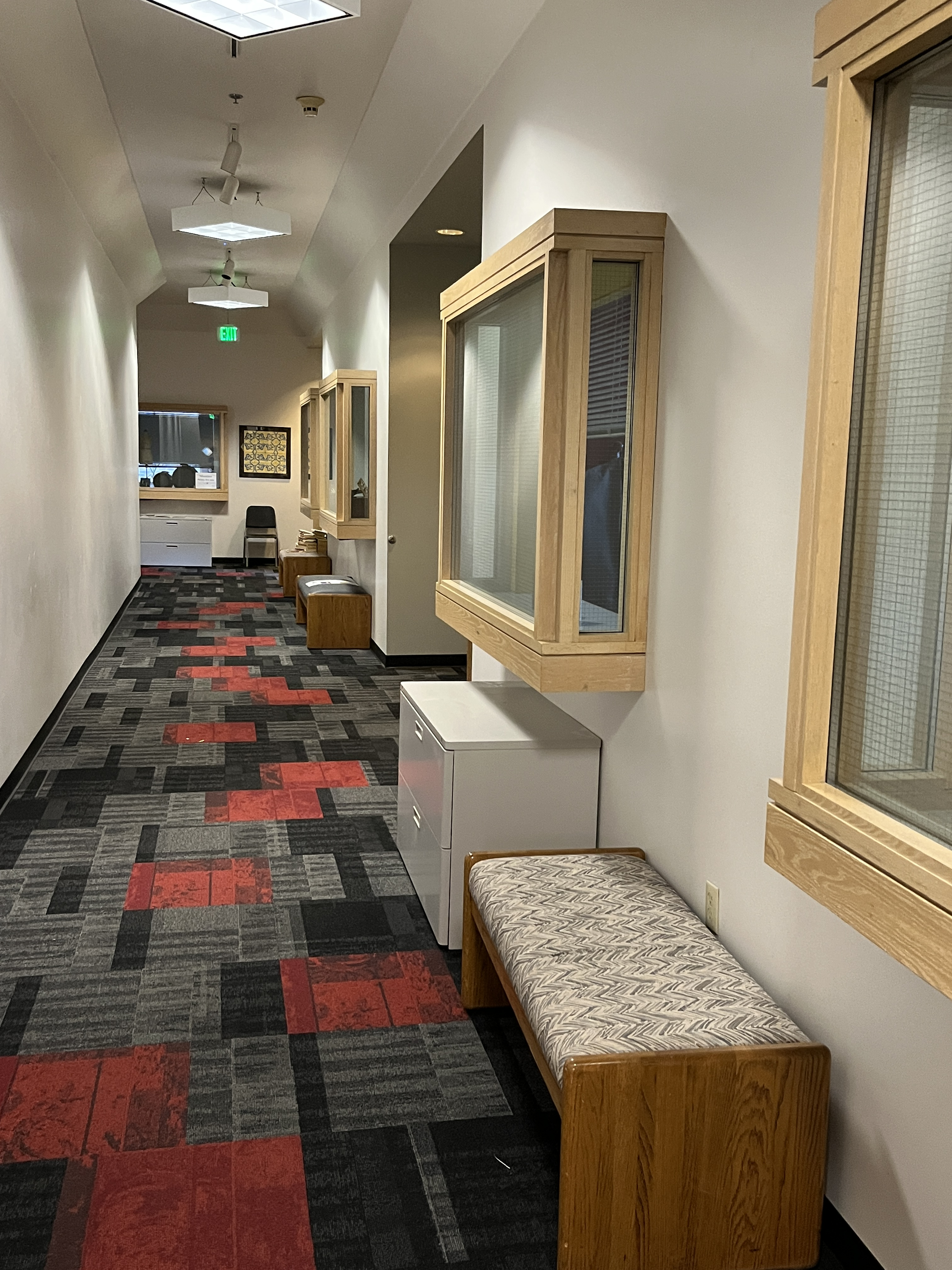
Interior

== See also ==
- Seattle University College of Arts and Sciences
