= Exhibitors Building (Grand Rapids, Michigan) =

- Fine Arts Building
- U.S. National Register of Historic Places
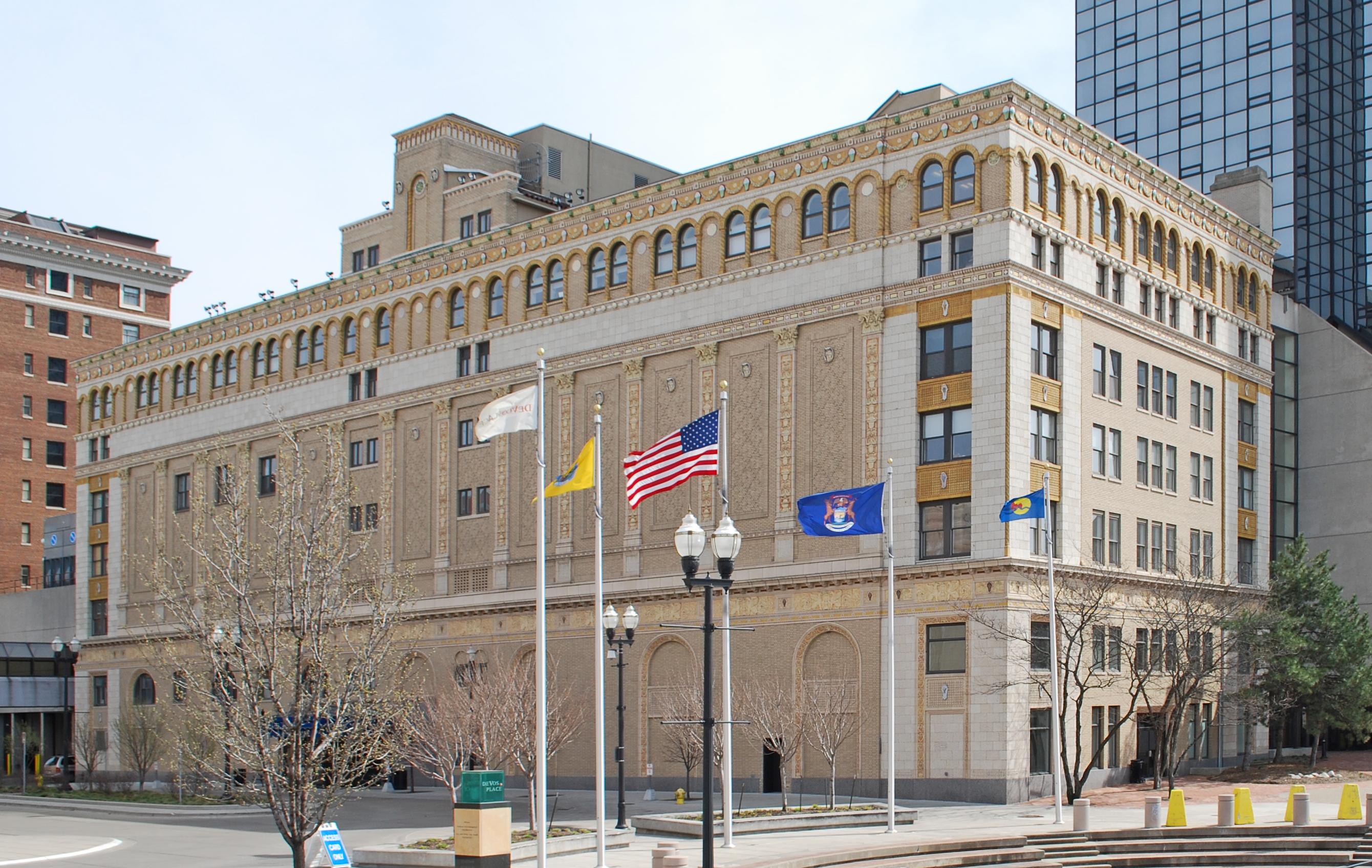

- Location within Michigan Location within the United States
- Interactive map
- Location: 220 Lyon St., NW, Grand Rapids, Michigan
- Coordinates: 42°58′01″N 85°40′26″W
- Area: less than one acre
- Built: 1925
- Architectural style: Renaissance, Italian-Renaissance
- NRHP reference No.: 82000537
- Added to NRHP: November 12, 1982

The Exhibitors Building, previously known as the Fine Arts Building, is a commercial office building located at 220 Lyon Street NW in Grand Rapids, Michigan, adjacent to the Amway Grand Plaza Hotel. It was listed on the National Register of Historic Places in 1982.

== History ==
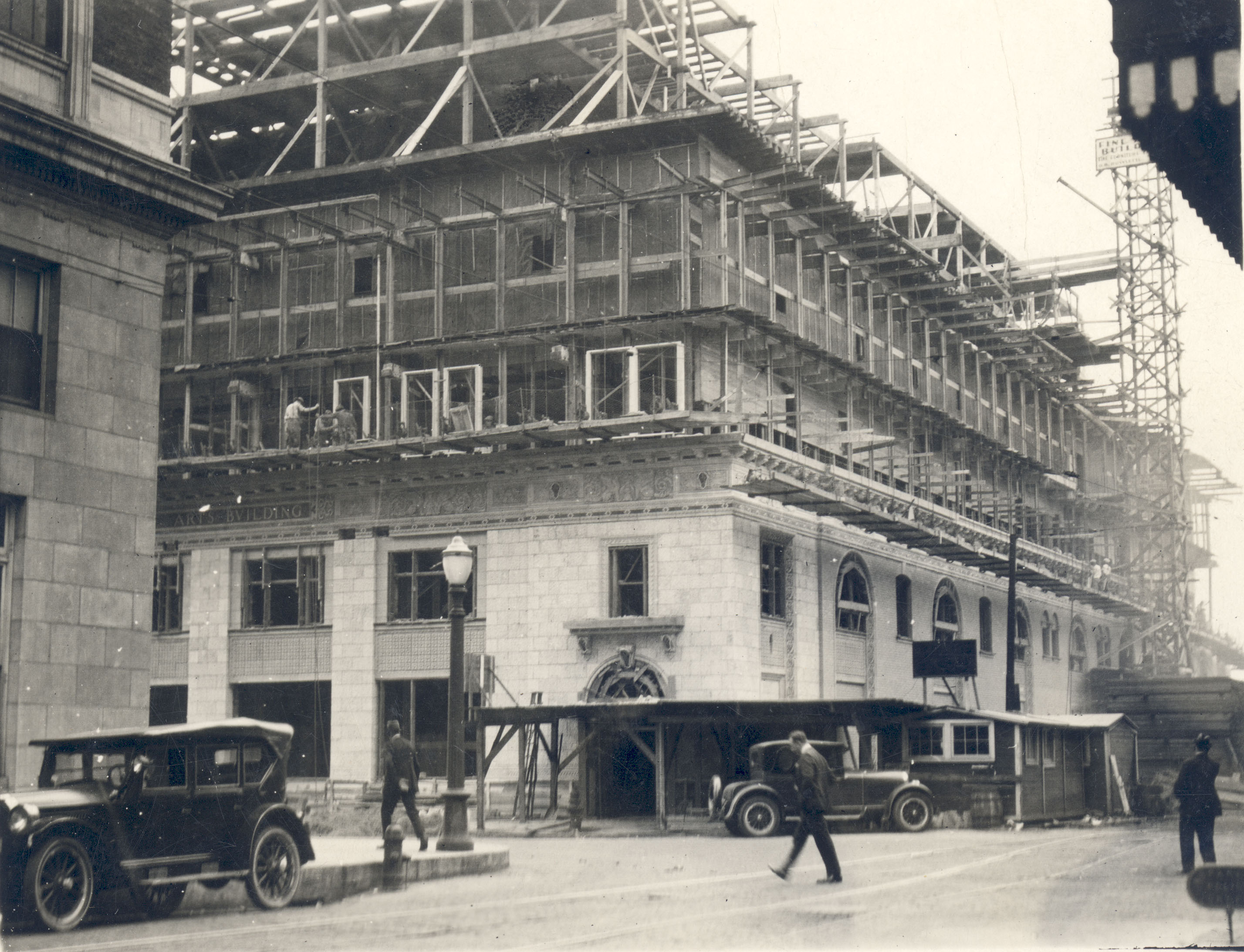
Construction of the building, 1925

In 1875, Felix Raniville and Simeon Sikes, opened a leather-goods workshop specializing in industrial belts. Raniville soon bought out his partner, and later purchased a larger building on Pearl Street, long with adjacent property on Lyon. He built a small factory and power plant on the river at the end of Lyon Street and between 1900 and 1910 constructed what is now the Exhibitors Building next to the plant. The building was originally designed to house business offices that were rented out to smaller companies.

In 1925, during Grand Rapids' furniture-making boom, local developer Gustave Hendricks conceived the idea of developing a set of furniture exhibition buildings located near the city's largest hotel, the Pantlind (now the Amway Grand Plaza Hotel). He first purchased the Nelson-Mather Building located across the street from the Pantlind; space in the building was sold out even before Hendricks completed the renovations. Hendricks then purchased Raniville's office building on Lyon, extensively remodeled it to house furniture showrooms, and renamed it the Fine Arts Building. However, during the Great Depression, many exhibitors had to give up their space; with declining tenancy, the building was taken over by the city for back taxes. In 1943 the city leased the building to the US Army Weather School.

In 1945, a group of local businessmen purchased the building and re-renovated it to house furniture showrooms. They changed its name to the Exhibitors Building. In 1970, the building was sold to Hollis M. Baker, and in 1979 the Amway Properties Corporation purchased the building and incorporated it into the Amway Grand Plaza complex.

== Description ==
The Exhibitors Building is an eight-story, trapezoid-shape, commercial building constructed of buff brick. The building measures 213 feet by 100 feet. It has terra cotta Italian Renaissance friezes and pilasters on the facades using beige, green, yellow, ochre, and red terra cotta tiles. Tilework images include griffins, fruit festoons, lion heads, and details symbolic of furniture-making.
