= Hunthausen Hall =

Building in Seattle, Washington, U.S.

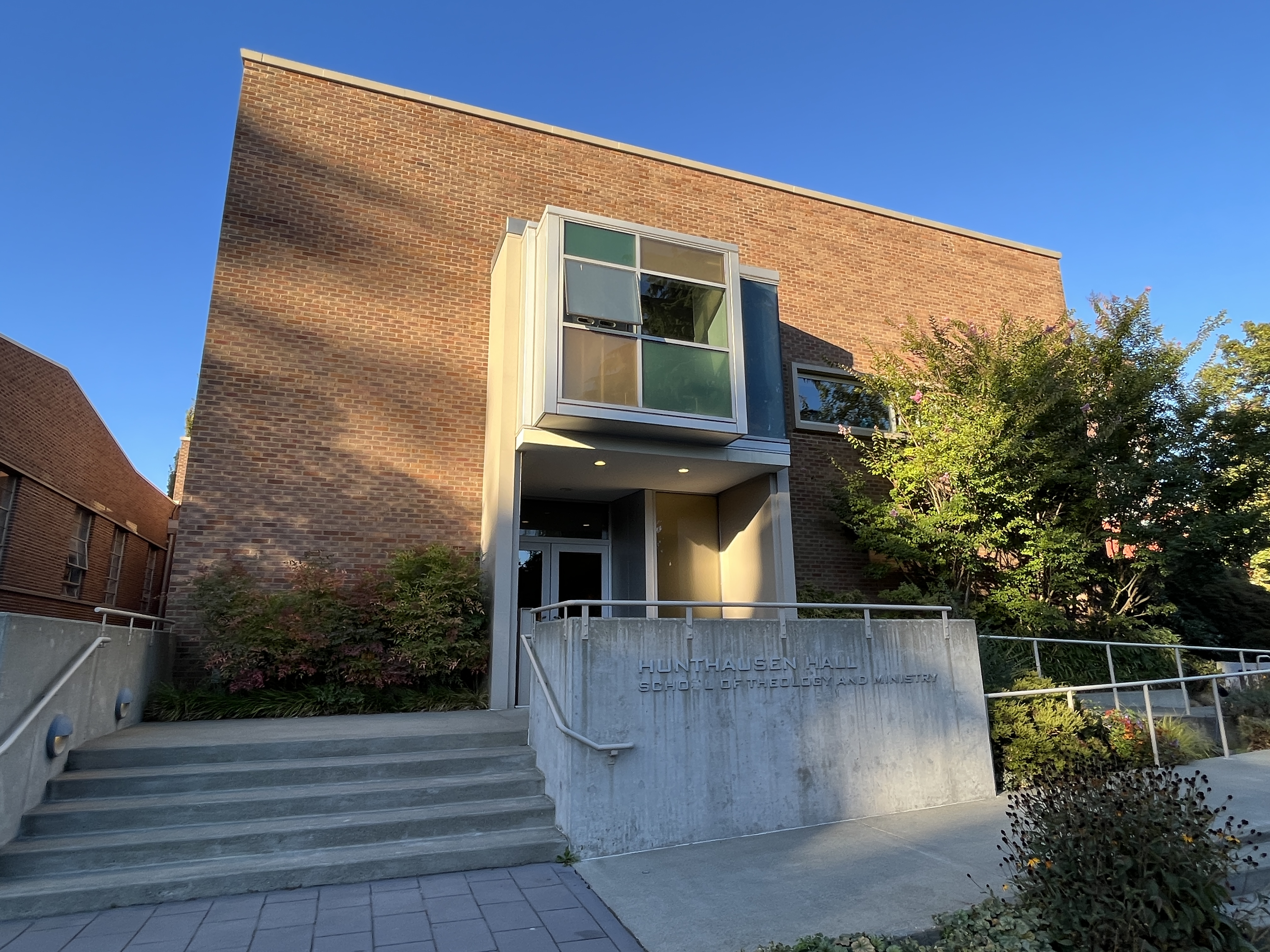
- The building's exterior, 2022
- Interactive map of the Hunthausen Hall area

General information
- Location: Seattle, Washington, United States
- Coordinates: 47°36′43″N 122°19′6″W

Hunthausen Hall is a building on the Seattle University campus, in the U.S. state of Washington.

The building was named after Rev. Raymond G. Hunthausen in 2004, and has housed the School of Theology and Ministry.

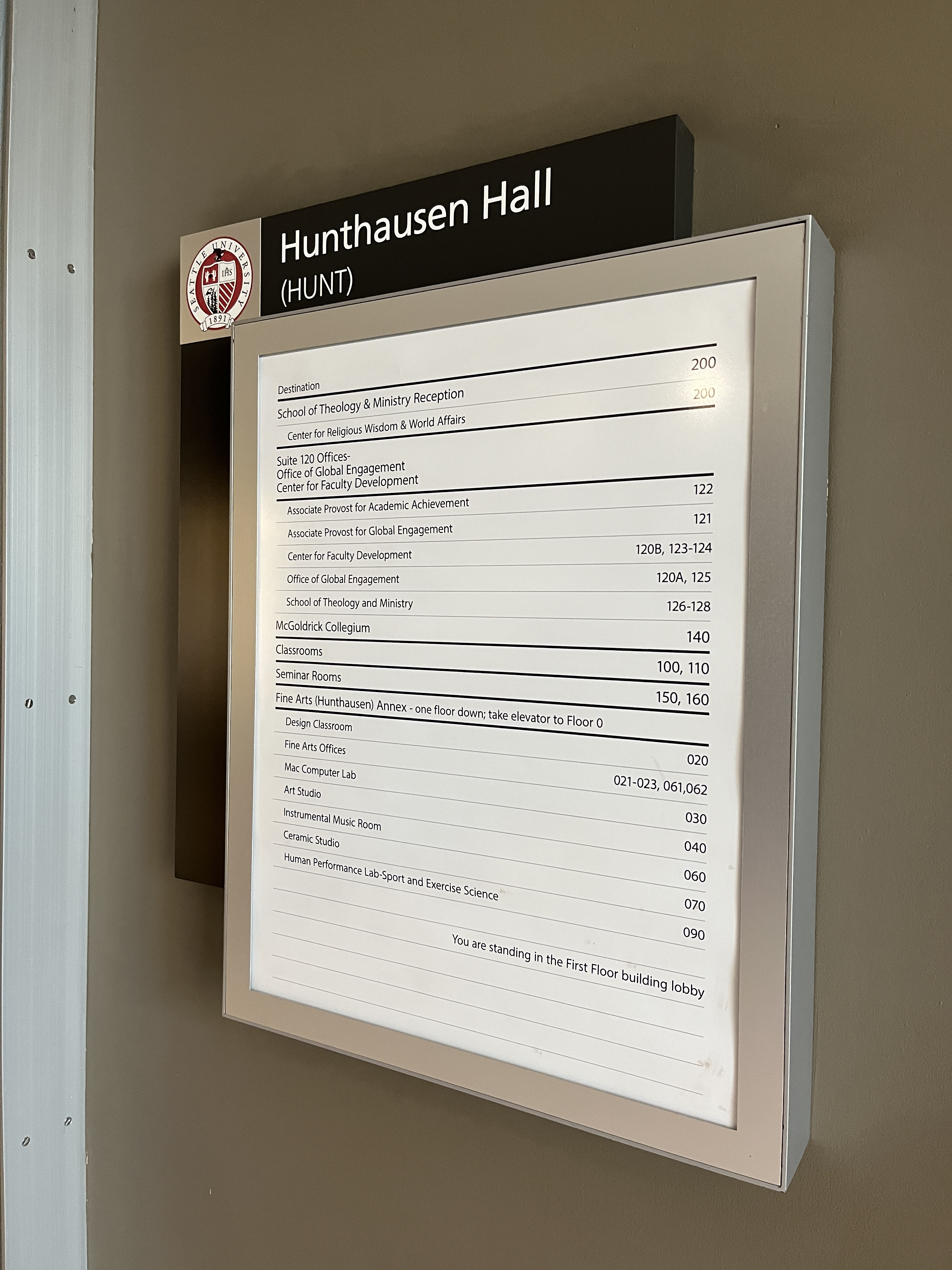

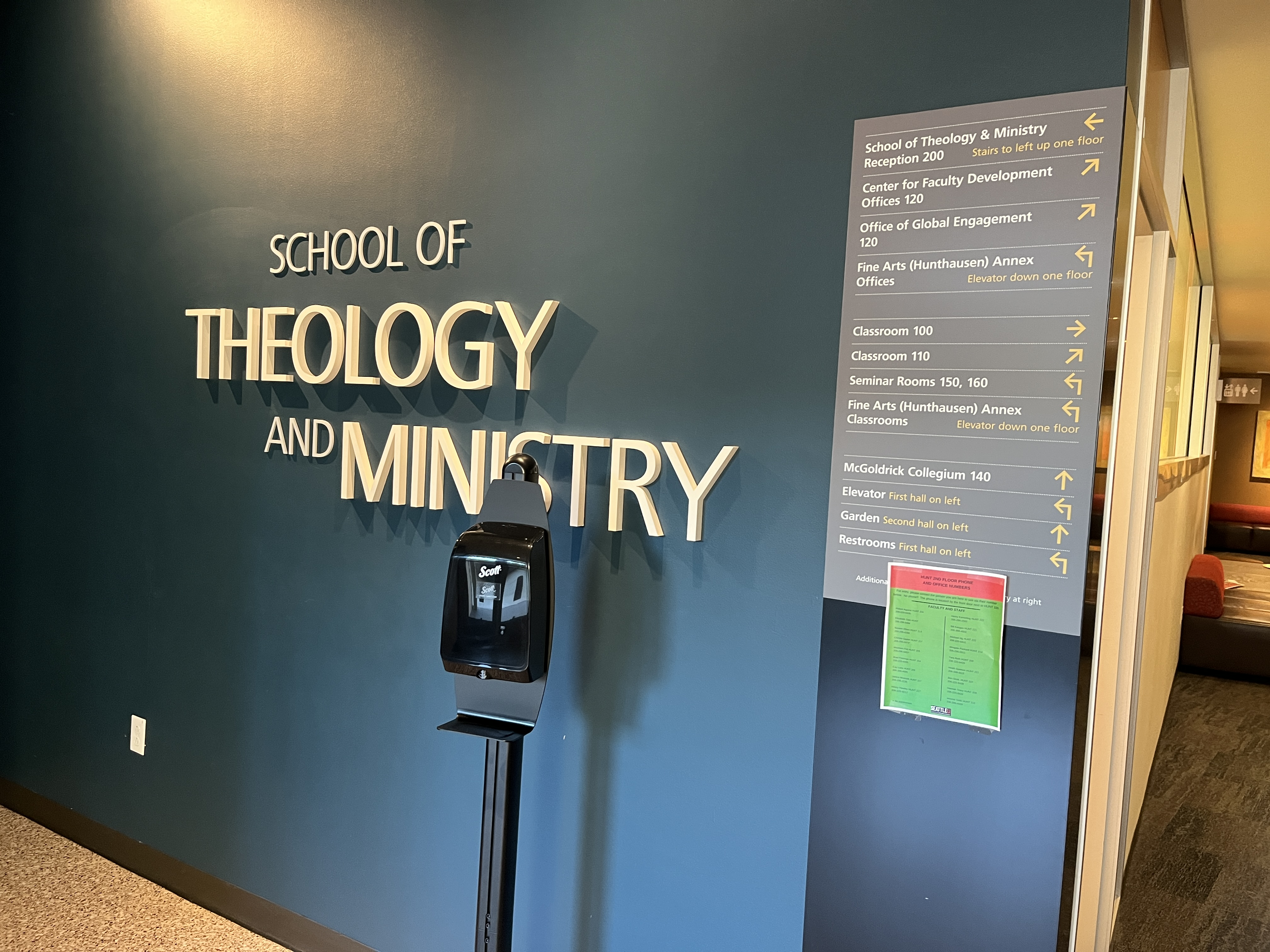

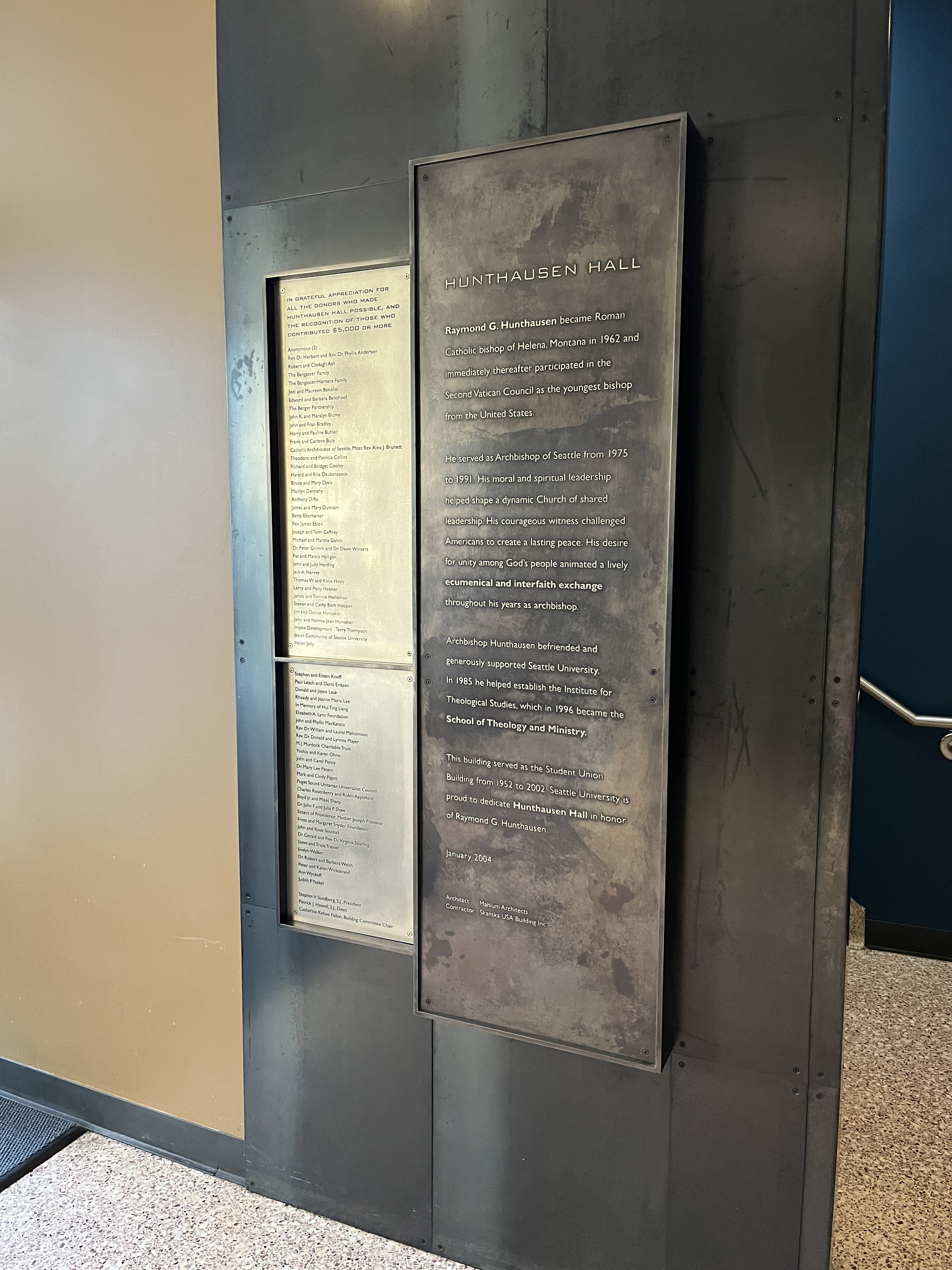
