= Big Moose =

Big Moose may refer to:

== Places ==
- Big Moose Lake, a lake in the Adirondack region of upstate New York
- Big Moose, New York, a hamlet located on Big Moose Lake
- Big Moose, New Brunswick, a community in Bathurst Parish, New Brunswick
- Big Moose Community Chapel, a historic chapel located on Big Moose Lake
- Big Moose Mountain, a mountain located in Piscataquis County, Maine
- Big Moose Lake, one of two so-named lakes in Minnesota
- Big Moose Lake, a lake in Carbon County, Montana
- Big Moose Scout Camp, a Boy Scouts of American camp in New York State

== People ==
- Big Moose Meyer, a National Basketball Association player
- Big Moose Mason, a fictional character in the Archie Comics universe known as "Big Moose"
- Dave Noble, an American football player nicknamed "Big Moose"
- Norman Ross, an American competition swimmer nicknamed "Big Moose"
- Johnny "Big Moose" Walker, an American musician
