= Anne LaBastille =

American author and ecologist

Mariette Anne LaBastille
- Born: November 20, 1933; Montclair, New Jersey
- Died: July 1, 2011 (aged 77); Plattsburgh, New York
- Other name: Anne LaBastille Bowes
- Education: Ph.D. Wildlife Ecology, 1969
- Alma mater: Cornell University (Ph.D.; B.S.); Colorado State University (M.S.)
- Known for: The Woodswoman series
- Spouse: C.V. “Major” Bowes
- Scientific career
- Workplaces: Adirondack Park Agency
- Theses: The life history, ecology, and management of the giant pied-billed grebe (Podilymbus gigas), Lake Atitlán, Guatemala (1969); An ecological analysis of mule deer winter range, Cache la Poudre Canyon, Colorado (1958)

Anne LaBastille (November 20, 1933 – July 1, 2011) was an American author, ecologist, and photographer. She was the author of more than a dozen books, including Woodswoman, Beyond Black Bear Lake, and Women of the Wilderness. She also wrote over 150 articles and over 25 scientific papers. She was honored by the World Wildlife Fund and the Explorers Club for her pioneering work in wildlife ecology in the United States and Guatemala. LaBastille also took many wildlife photographs, many of which were published in nature publications.

== Early life and marriage ==
LaBastille was born in Montclair, New Jersey, the only child of Ferdinand LaBastille – a professor, and Irma Goebel – a concert pianist, stage actress and musician. Her full name was Mariette Anne LaBastille, though she never used her first name. While her date of birth is often listed as Nov 20, 1935, her true date of birth was November 20, 1933, which Valerie J. Nelson of the Los Angeles Times discovered while preparing LaBastille's obituary. LaBastille was married for seven years to C.V. “Major” Bowes (born 29 Apr 1919; died 25 Oct 2012), the owner of the Covewood Lodge on Big Moose Lake, New York. They had no children.

== Education and career ==
LaBastille received her Ph.D. in Wildlife Ecology from Cornell University in 1969. She also had an M.S. in Wildlife Management from the Colorado State University (1958), and a B.S. in Conservation of Natural Resources from Cornell (1955).

LaBastille started out as a contributing writer to several wildlife magazines, including Sierra Club and National Geographic. She became a licensed New York State Guide in the 1970s and offered guide services for backpacking and canoe trips into the Adirondacks. She gave wilderness workshops and lectures for over forty years, joined several New York Adirondack Mountains conservation organizations, and was on the Adirondack Park Agency Board of Commissioners for 17 years. She traveled around the world and worked with many non-profit organizations to study and alleviate the destructive effects of acid rain and pollution on lakes and wildlife.

== The Woodswoman series ==
LaBastille's most popular books, the Woodswoman series, were a set of four memoirs spanning four decades of her life in the Adirondack Mountains and chronicled her relationship with the wilderness. Inspired by Henry David Thoreau's Walden, LaBastille purchased land on the edge of a mountain lake in the Adirondacks, where she built a log cabin in 1964. At the beginning of her first book, Woodswoman (1976), she documented the process of obtaining materials and building the cabin with the help of a pair of local carpenters. To avoid cutting old growth forest on the property, she purchased pre-cut logs from a local sawmill and used store-bought lumber to build the floor joists, roof, door frames, and window frames. The remainder of Woodswoman records her adventures living in this log cabin without comforts such as electricity or running water, as well as her explorations into the wilderness of the Adirondacks. In her second book, Beyond Black Bear Lake (1987), she described how she built her smaller second cabin, Thoreau II, on a more remote area of her property in order to obtain a more Walden-like experience. Both the first and second books explored her friendships, romances, her previous marriage, her close bonds to her German Shepherd dogs, the ebb and flow of nature, and her conservation efforts. She conducted research on the endangered, and eventually extinct, giant pied-bill grebe bird.

The final two books of the series, Woodswoman III (1997) and Woodswoman IIII (2003), were published by LaBastille's publishing company, "West of the Wind Publications, Inc". In both volumes, LaBastille included stories illustrating the increasing difficulty of juggling a multifaceted career consisting of freelance writing, academic teaching, and conservation consulting work, with her ever-present desire to retreat into the wilderness. In Woodswoman III, she also discussed how pollutants were contaminating her remote lake; her only source of drinking water. Because of this, she purchased a farmstead near the hamlet of Wadhams in the Town of Westport near the western shore of Lake Champlain. The farmstead had modern conveniences such as phone and electricity, but was within the boundaries of the Adirondack Park. She writes in Woodswoman IIII how her adamant stance against the development of the Adirondack Park had created contention and enemies. She received death threats, her remote cabin was broken into and a barn on her Westport property was burned down. It has been rumored that Anne began working on Woodswoman V shortly after Woodswoman IIII was published; however, no draft has ever been found. She stated how self-publishing was more lucrative, but took away valuable time she needed for writing.

== Documerica Project ==
LaBastille was part of the Documerica Project developed by the Environmental Protection Agency (EPA). From 1971 to 1977, the EPA hired freelance photographers to photograph areas with environmental problems, EPA activities, and the outdoors. LaBastille's photos were mostly taken in upstate New York and show a variety of subjects, including natural beauty and wildlife, environmental problems, urban sprawl, and everyday life in small towns.

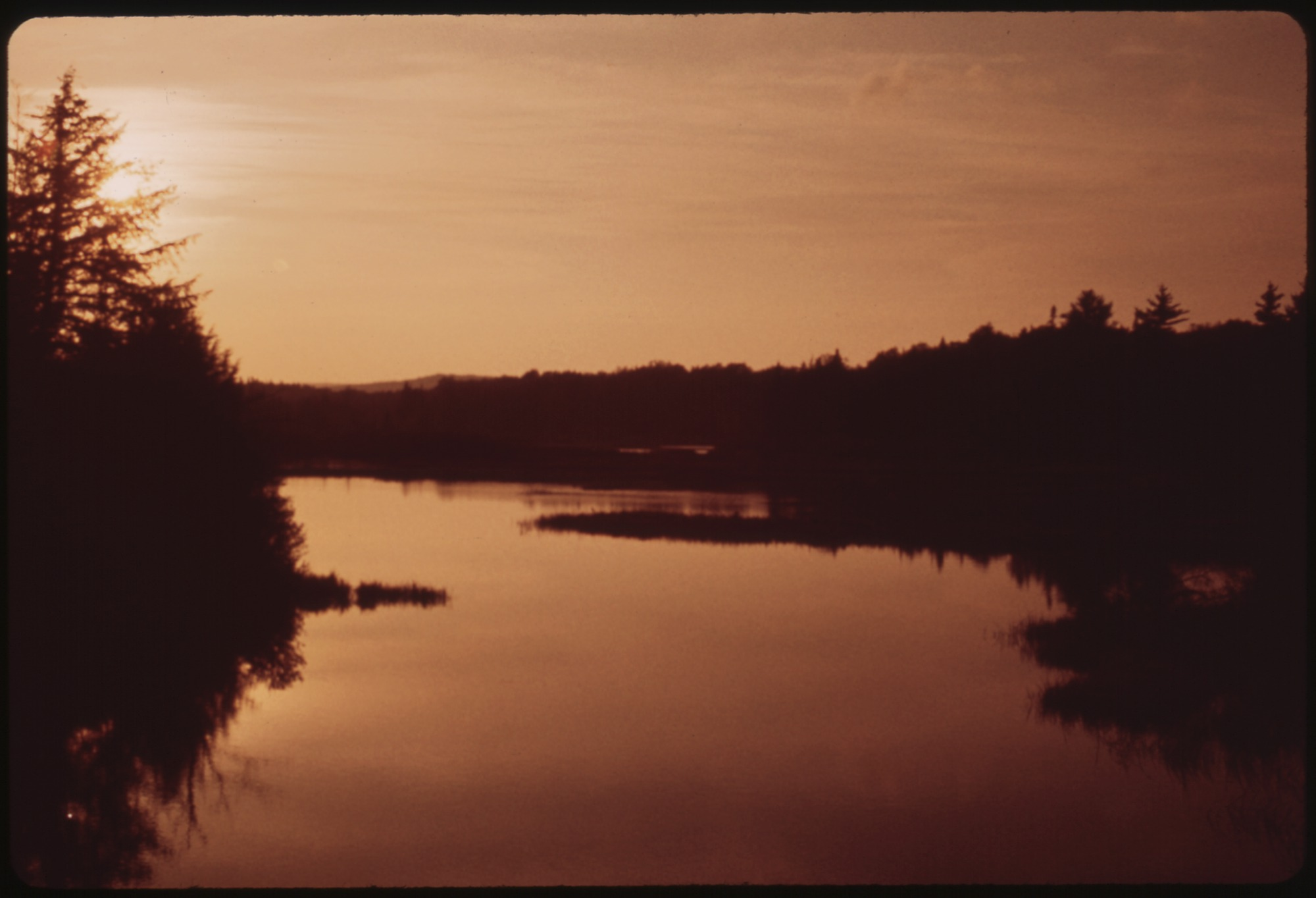
North branch of the Moose River seen from the bridge at Thendara, Sunset, 1973

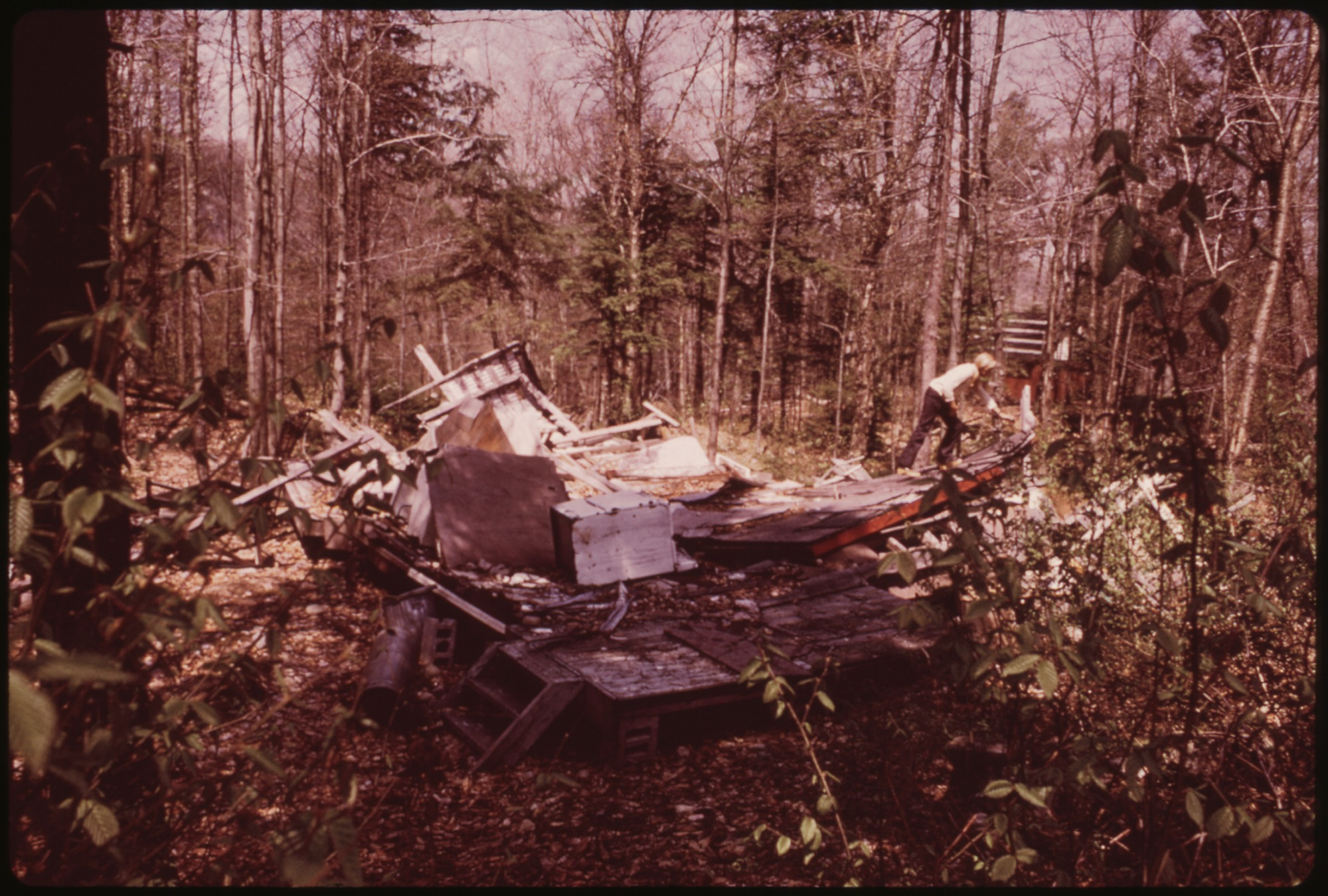
Remains of a summer cottage which collapsed under the weight of the winter's snow, 1973

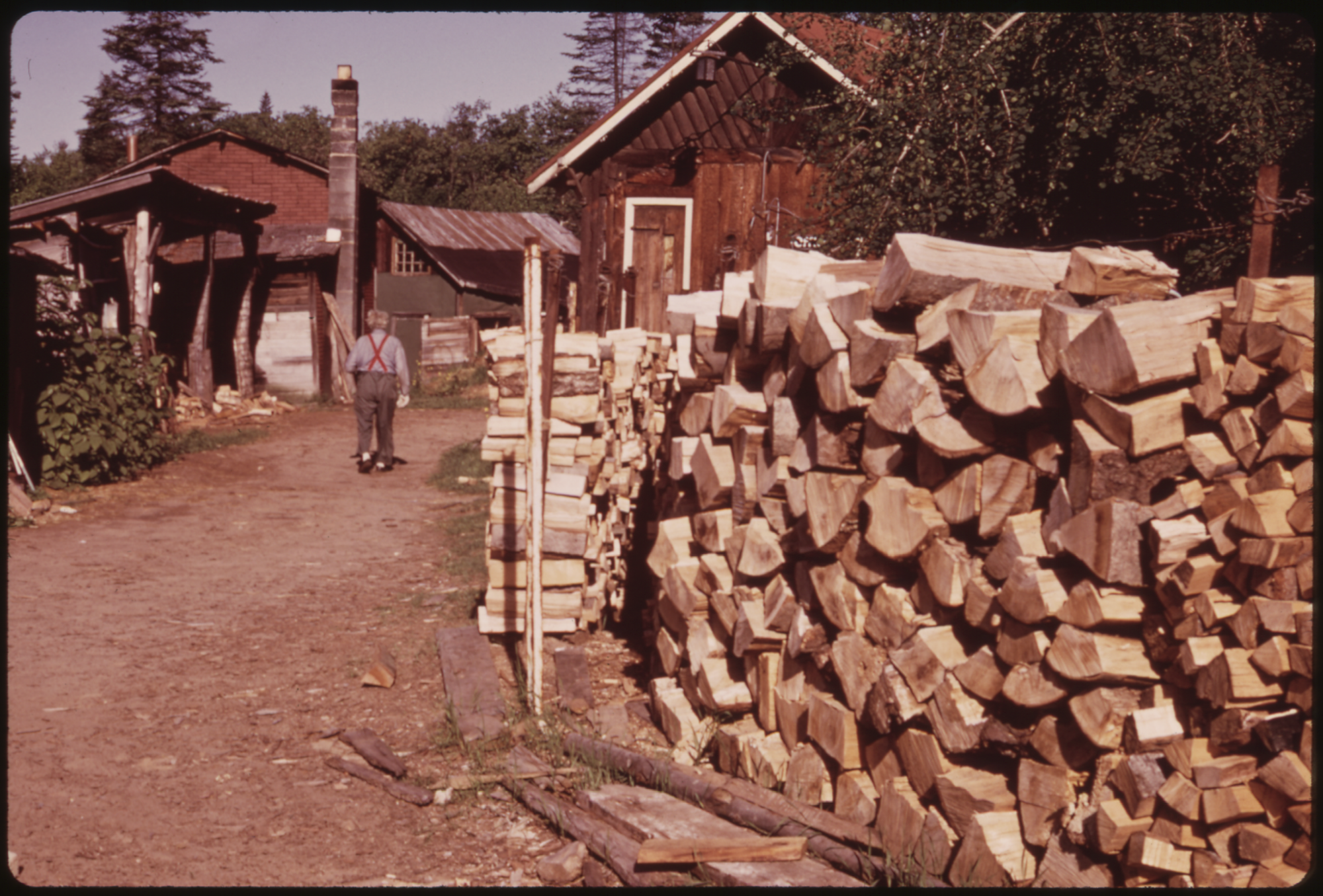
Cull logs stacked for sale at Big Moose, 1973

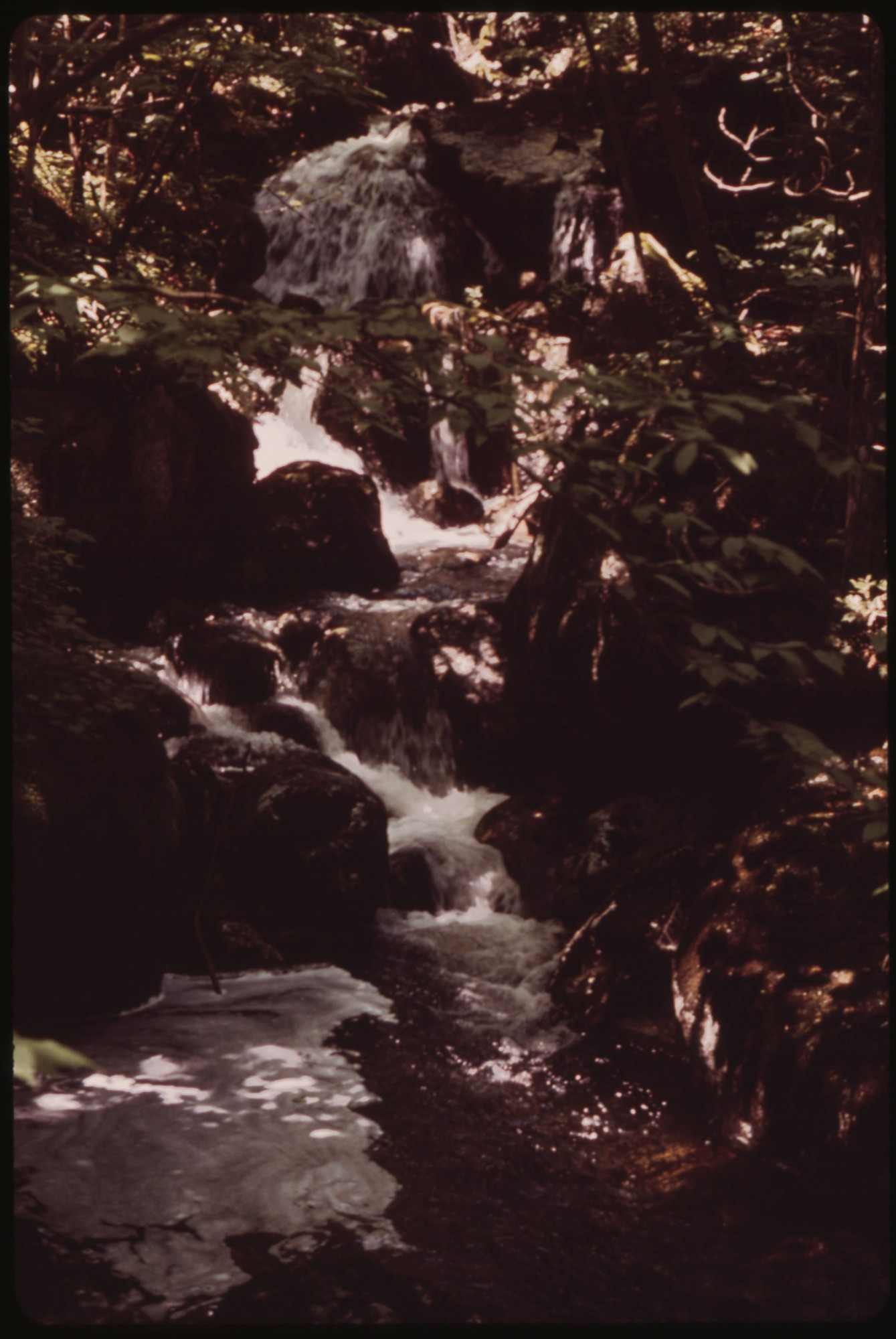
Creek beside trail up Algonquin Peak, 1973

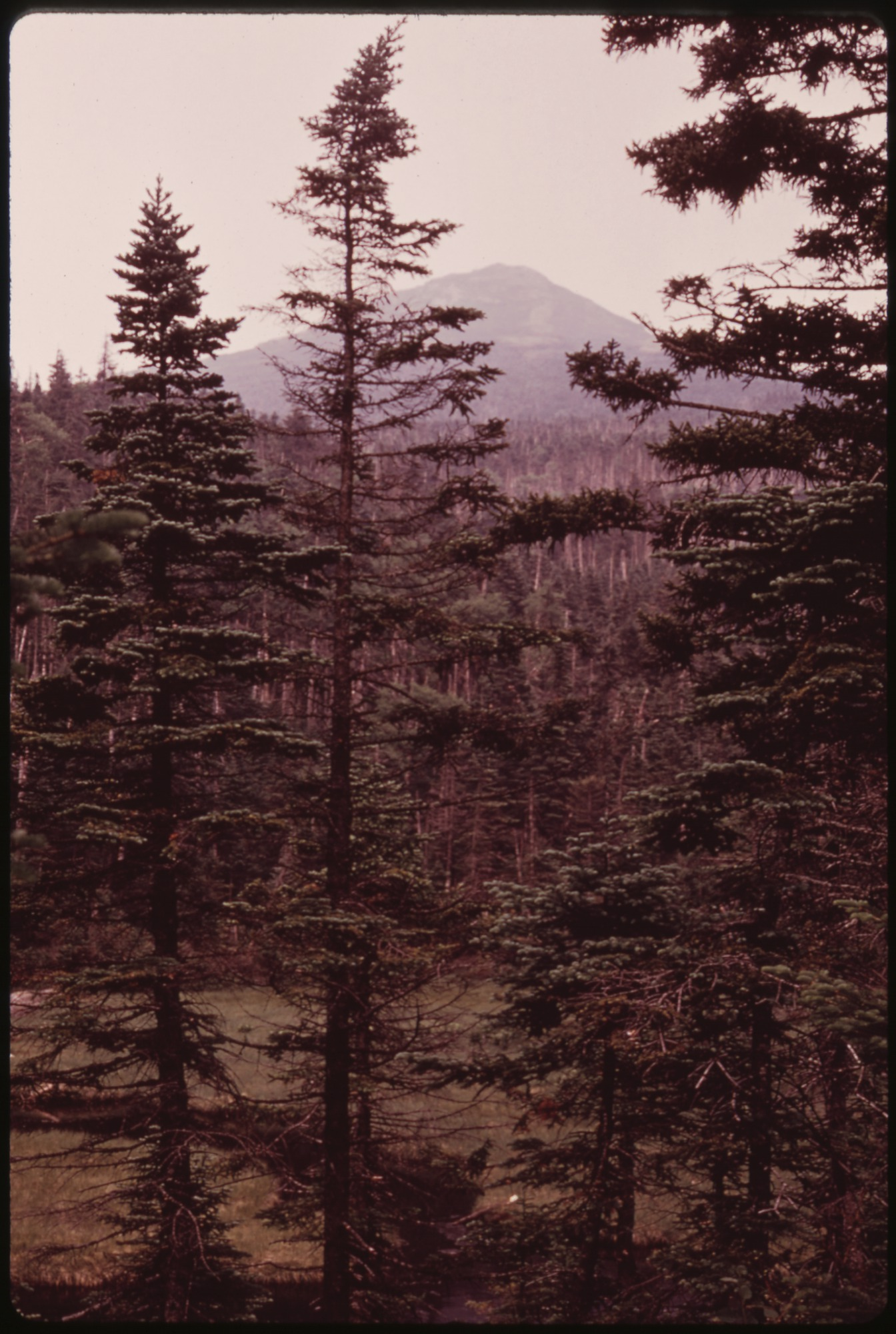
Summit of Mount Marcy, New York, 1973

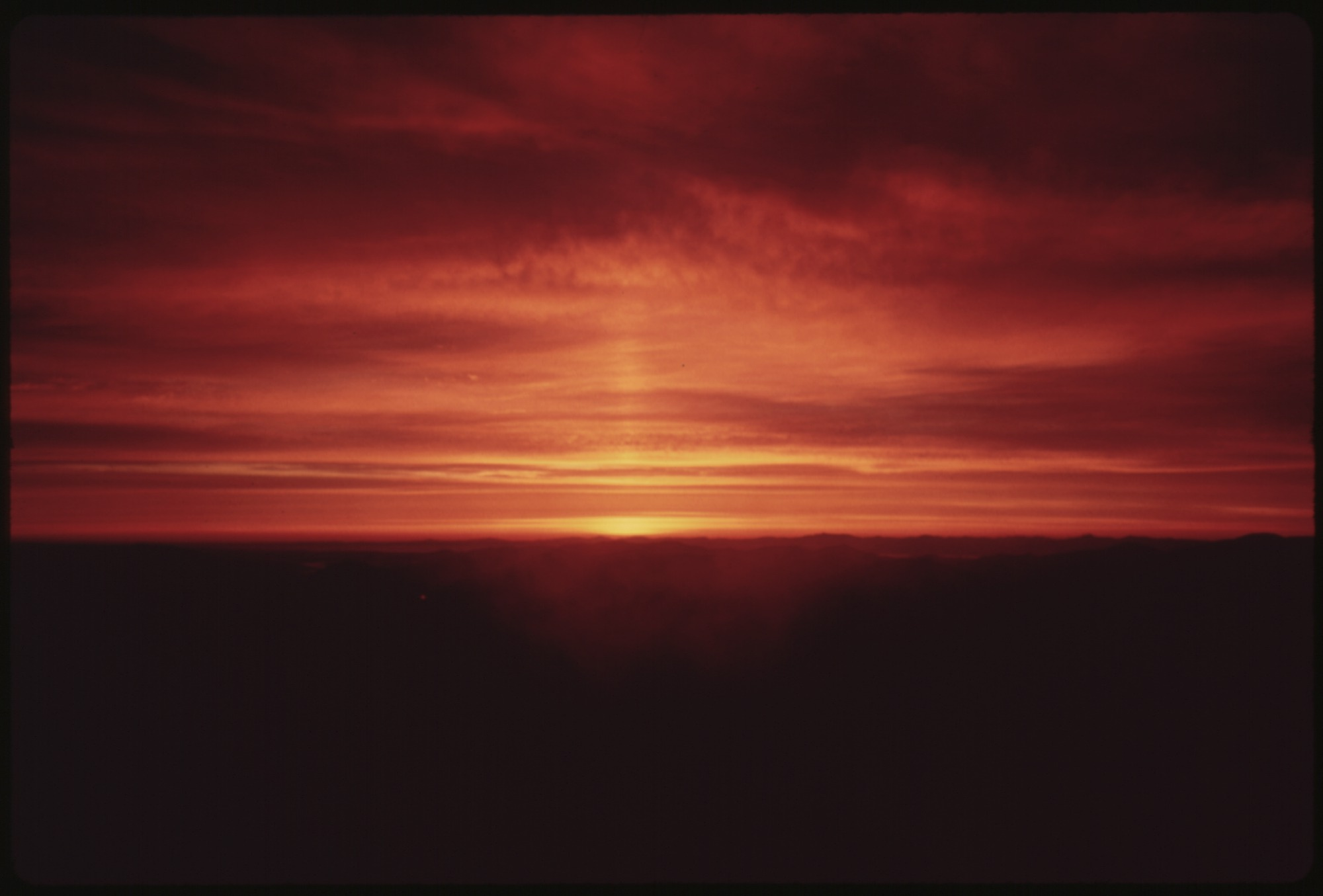
Sunset seen from the top of Algonquin Peak, 1973

== Later life and death ==
In her later years, LaBastille began spending less and less time at her mountain retreat. In Woodswoman IIII and in an interview with the Cornell Alumni Magazine, LaBastille noted that rising global temperatures had transformed her lakeside property from a year-round home into a seasonal retreat. Throughout the 1960s and early 1970s, a thick sheet of ice formed on the lake, thus allowing snowshoeing across its surface from late November through late April. But in subsequent years warmer winter temperatures and February rain showers led to thinner lake ice, making trips across the lake treacherous and unpredictable. Without year-round neighbors or a phone in cases of emergency, LaBastille elected to stop spending winters at the cabin. She instead spent more time at her farmstead near Lake Champlain. Nevertheless, she wrote that she kept her mountain retreat as her place for "refuge, quiet, as a peaceful place to write and contemplate...". In 2007, she was still living part-time in her lakeside cabin. In 2008, LaBastille became ill and was unable to care for herself at home. John Davis, Conservation Director for the Adirondack Council, writing about his trip through the Adirondacks in 2008 wrote, "Dear friend and Park champion for decades, Anne LaBastille is for first time in memory missing a summer at her beloved cabin north of here, due to health concerns.". LaBastille died of Alzheimer's disease at a nursing home in Plattsburgh, New York on July 1, 2011.

== Honors ==
- 1974 World Wildlife Fund Gold Medal for Conservation
- 1980 Honorary Doctorates of Literature & Humane Letters from Union College, Schenectady, NY
- 1984 The Citation of Merit from The Explorers Club.
- 1986 Outstanding Alumni Award, Cornell University, College of Agriculture and Life Sciences
- 1987 Warner College of Natural Resources Honor Alumnus/Alumna Award, Colorado State University
- 1988 Jade of Chiefs Award from the Outdoor Writers Association of America
- 1990 Honorary Doctor of Letters from Ripon College, Wisconsin.
- 1990 Honorary Doctor of Science from State University of New York at Albany
- 1993 Gold Medal from the Society of Woman Geographers
- 1994 Roger Tory Peterson Award for National Nature Educator.
- 2001 Wayne G. Basler Chair of Excellence for the Integration of Arts, Rhetoric and Science at East Tennessee State University.
- 2008 Lifetime Achievement Award, Adirondack Literary Awards
- 2008 Howard Zahniser Adirondack Award given by the Association for the Protection of the Adirondacks.
- 2009 Honoree of the National Women's History Month, 2009: Women Taking the Lead to Save Our Planet

== Books ==
- Bird kingdom of the Mayas. LaBastille-Bowes, Anne. Illustrated by Anita Benarde. Van Nostrand, Princeton, NJ. 1967.
- White-tailed Deer. LaBastille, Anne. National Wildlife Federation, 1973. ISBN 0-912186-00-3
- Wild Bobcats. LaBastille, Anne. National Wildlife Federation, 1973. ISBN 0-912186-07-0
- The Opossums, Ranger Rick's Best Friends. LaBastille, Anne. National Wildlife Federation, 1974. ISBN 0-912186-08-9
- The Seal Family. LaBastille, Anne. National Wildlife Federation 1974. ISBN 0-912186-09-7
- Woodswoman. LaBastille, Anne. E. P. Dutton, New York, 1976. ISBN 0-525-23715-1
- Assignment: Wildlife. LaBastille, Anne. Dutton, New York, 1980. ISBN 0-525-05910-5
- Women and Wilderness. LaBastille, Anne. Sierra Club Books, San Francisco, 1980. ISBN 0-87156-234-0
- Beyond Black Bear Lake. LaBastille, Anne. Norton, New York, 1987. ISBN 0-393-02388-5
- Mama Poc : An ecologist's account of the extinction of a species. LaBastille, Anne. W.W. Norton, New York. 1990. ISBN 0-393-02830-5
- The Wilderness World of Anne LaBastille. LaBastille, Anne. West of the Wind Publications, Westport, N.Y. 1992. ISBN 0-9632846-0-6
- Birds of the Mayas: Maya Folk Tales : Field guide to birds of the Maya world : Complete check list of birds. Written and illustrated by LaBastille, Anne. West of the Wind Publications, Westport, N.Y. 1993.
- Woodswoman III: Book three of the Woodswoman's adventures. LaBastille, Anne. West of the Wind Publications, Westport, N.Y. 1997. ISBN 0-9632846-1-4
- Jaguar Totem. LaBastille, Anne. West of the Wind Publications, Westport, N.Y. 1999. ISBN 0-9632846-2-2
- The Extraordinary Adirondack Journey of Clarence Petty : Wilderness guide, pilot, and conservationist. Angus, Christopher; with a foreword by LaBastille, Anne. Syracuse University Press, Syracuse, N.Y. 2002. ISBN 0-8156-0741-5
- Woodswoman IIII: Book four of the Woodswoman's adventures . LaBastille, Anne. West of the Wind Publications, Westport, N.Y. 2003 ISBN 0-9632846-3-0
