= Murder of Grace Brown =

1906 homicide in Big Moose Lake, New York

Grace Brown
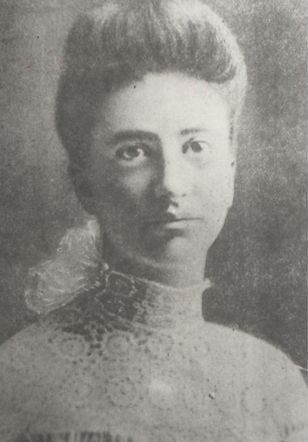
- Born: Grace Mae Brown; March 20, 1886; South Otselic, New York
- Died: July 11, 1906 (aged 20); Big Moose Lake, New York
- Cause of death: Murder by drowning
- Resting place: Valley View Cemetery, South Otselic, New York
- Known for: Circumstances of her death inspired fictional treatments as: An American Tragedy; A Gathering Light
- Partner: Chester Gillette
- Children: 0 (pregnant at time of death)

Grace Mae Brown (March 20, 1886 – July 11, 1906) was an American woman who was murdered by her boyfriend, Chester Gillette, on Big Moose Lake, New York, after telling him she was pregnant. The murder, and the subsequent trial of the suspect, attracted national newspaper attention.

Brown's life has inspired such fictional treatments as Theodore Dreiser's 1925 novel An American Tragedy, the George Stevens film A Place in the Sun, and Jennifer Donnelly's 2003 novel A Northern Light (A Gathering Light in the U.K). The murder was analyzed and explored in two non-fiction books, both published in 1986: Adirondack Tragedy: The Gillette Murder Case of 1906, written by Joseph W. Brownell and Patricia A. Wawrzaszek, and Murder in the Adirondacks: An American Tragedy Revisited, by Craig Brandon (which was updated in 2017).

== Childhood ==
Grace Brown grew up in the village of South Otselic, Chenango County, New York, the middle child and daughter of a successful Chenango County dairy farmer. She was reportedly given the nickname "Billy" because of her love of the contemporary hit song "(Won't You Come Home) Bill Bailey". Brown attended grammar school in the village, and became close friends with a teacher, Maud Kenyon Crumb, and Crumb's husband. Later, Brown often signed her love letters "The Kid", after the Western outlaw Billy the Kid.

In 1904, at the age of 18, Brown moved to nearby Cortland to live with her married sister Ada, and to work at the new Gillette Skirt Factory.

== Romance ==
Chester Gillette, the nephew of the factory owner, had a less stable childhood. He had moved to Cortland in 1905 and started working at the company. Through his uncle, he met people in upper-class society in Cortland. He also began a romantic and sexual relationship with Brown, a "factory girl".

In Spring 1906, Brown became pregnant, and returned to her parents in South Otselic. Gillette agreed to take her away to the Adirondacks, apparently promising marriage. Because Brown packed her entire wardrobe for the trip and Gillette packed just a small suitcase, some 21st-century writers suggest that Gillette had promised to take Brown to a maternity home in upstate New York, where she could live until she delivered the child.

During their journey to the Adirondacks, they registered at hotels using false names, including a night at a hotel in Utica, New York, where they apparently left without paying for their stay. They continued by train to Tupper Lake in Franklin County, where they spent another night. Rain the next day ruined their plans for an outing on a nearby lake, so they returned south by train to Big Moose Lake, which straddles Herkimer and Hamilton counties.

== Murder ==
On July 11, the couple were seen rowing out on Big Moose Lake. Gillette had entered the pseudonym "Carl Grahm" in the hotel register (since Gillette's suitcase was monogrammed "C.E.G.", he chose a name with the same initials). While they were on the lake, Gillette is believed to have struck Brown over the head with a tennis racket (which had been seen strapped to his suitcase), or possibly an oar, after which Brown is believed to have fallen out of the boat and drowned. Gillette returned alone, and gave varying explanations for what had occurred.

After Brown's body was found the next day, Gillette was arrested in the nearby town of Inlet, New York. The defense at trial claimed that Grace had been confused and suddenly jumped out of the boat and into the water, despite being fully clothed. Gillette testified, "We talked a little more, then she got up and jumped in the water, just jumped in."

== Love letters ==
From Gillette's rented room, authorities confiscated Brown's love letters to Gillette as evidence. District attorney George Ward read the letters aloud to the court during the trial in the fall of 1906, and Brown's letters gained the trial national attention. In her letters, Brown pleaded with Gillette to accept responsibility for her pregnancy. In her final letter, written July 5, Brown looked forward to her impending Adirondack trip with Gillette. She said farewell to her childhood home of South Otselic, wishing she could confess her pregnancy to her mother:

"I know I shall never see any of them again. And mamma! Great heavens, how I do love mamma! I don't know what I shall do without her (...) Sometimes I think if I could tell mamma, but I can't. She has trouble enough as it is, and I couldn't break her heart like that. If I come back dead, perhaps if she does not know, she won't be angry with me."

Copies of Brown's love letters were published in booklet form, and sold outside the courtroom during the trial. Theodore Dreiser paraphrased many of these letters in his novel An American Tragedy, quoting the final letter almost verbatim. Jennifer Donnelly used many of the letters in her novel A Northern Light. Letters written between the two, as well as Gillette's diary, have been donated to Hamilton College.

== Trial ==
The trial lasted three weeks, and resulted in a guilty verdict for Gillette for the premeditated murder of Brown; he was sentenced to death. The New York Court of Appeals affirmed the conviction, and Governor Charles Evans Hughes refused to grant clemency.

Gillette was executed on March 30, 1908, in Auburn Correctional Facility by electrocution.

== Works ==
- Donnelly, Jennifer: A Northern Light; London, United Kingdom: Bloomsbury Publishing, Plc, 2003.
- Brandon, Craig: Murder in the Adirondacks; Utica, New York: North Country Books, Inc., 1986, 1995.
- Brownell, Joseph and Wawrzaszek, Patricia: Adirondack Tragedy; Interlaken, New York; Heart of the Lakes Publishing, 1986.
- Thompson, Harold W. Body, Boots and Britches; Cantry, New York: Syracuse University Press, 1939, 1967, 1979.

== Film ==
Dreiser's novel inspired two films, An American Tragedy (1931) and A Place in the Sun (1951). The former starred Phillips Holmes, Frances Dee, and Sylvia Sidney while the latter starred Montgomery Clift, Elizabeth Taylor, and Shelley Winters. It also inspired the eponymous 1981 Soviet four-part television series «Американская Трагедия».

Elements of the Murder at Big Moose Lake seem to inspire Woody Allen's 2005 film, Match Point, which has been thought to have similarities with A Place in the Sun.

== Opera ==
Tobias Picker composed the music for an opera adaptation of An American Tragedy (2005), with a libretto by Gene Scheer. Commissioned by the Metropolitan Opera, the work premiered at Lincoln Center in New York City.
