= Wickes, Montana =

- Ghost town
- Location within Montana Location within the United States
- Coordinates: 46°20′59″N 112°06′12″W
- Country: United States
- State: Montana
- County: Jefferson
- Elevation: 5,197 ft (1,584 m)
- Time zone: UTC-7 (Mountain (MST))
  - Summer (DST): UTC-6 (MDT)
- Postal code: 59638
- Area code: 406
- GNIS feature ID: 793263

Wickes is a ghost town in Jefferson County, Montana, United States. It is located approximately 5 miles (8 km) west of Jefferson City, and can be reached from the Jefferson City interchange of Interstate 15 by following Corbin Road until it intersects with Wickes Road at the old Corbin townsite, which is itself a historic mining community.

== History ==
A silver deposit was discovered in the area in 1869 which was worked by Alta Mine, one of the territory's richest silver mines. The interests were sold in 1876 to a group of investors headed by William W. Wickes. The investors platted the townsite in 1877. In 1879 Samuel T. Hauser reorganized the company into the Alta Montana Company. By 1880 the town grew to 400 residents. The Alta mill burned down in 1882 and the group sold out to Hauser. He rebuilt the silver mill and convinced Northern Pacific Railroad to build a branch line between Helena and Wickes. In 1887, the Helena Mining and Reduction Company built the town’s first smelter. The town grew to around 1,500 residents by 1893. When the Sherman Silver Purchase Act of 1890 was repealed the company closed its smelter. In 1896 the mine was closed.

In 1901 a fire destroyed the entire business portion of the town. In 1909 a new townsite was laid out near the railroad tracks. The Corbin railroad station was moved to Wickes. The school operated until the 1930s.

A newspaper, the Wickes Pioneer, was started in August 1895 by publisher Robert G. Bailey. It ended shortly after the mine closed in 1896.

== Notable people ==
- Chester Gillette (1883–1908), born in Wickes; later convicted of and executed for the murder of Grace Brown in New York
