= A Northern Light =

2003 novel by Jennifer Donnelly

- First edition
- Author: Jennifer Donnelly
- Language: English
- Genre: Young adult historical novel, mystery
- Publisher: Harcourt Children's Books
- Publication date: April 1, 2003
- Publication place: United States
- Media type: Print (hardback & paperback), Audiobook
- Pages: 389 pp (first edition) includes bibliography
- ISBN: 978-0-15-216705-9
- OCLC: 49796591
- LC Class: PZ7.D7194 No 2003

A Northern Light, or A Gathering Light in the U.K., is an American historical novel for young adults, written by Jennifer Donnelly and published by Harcourt in 2003. Set in northern Herkimer County, New York in 1906, it is based on the murder of Grace Brown case —the basis also for An American Tragedy by Theodore Dreiser (1925).

In the U.K., Bloomsbury published an edition within the calendar year, entitled A Gathering Light, (Note: Northern Lights (Scholastic UK, 1995) by Philip Pullman had been published in the U.S. as The Golden Compass (Knopf, 1996), so only one Northern Light(s) title was used on each continent. • Both books won the annual British Carnegie Medal, which opened before 2003 to American authors who co-publish in the U.K., and both were named one of the top ten Medal-winning books for the 70th anniversary. Northern Lights by Pullman won the public vote from that shortlist and was thus celebrated as the "Carnegie of Carnegies".) and Donnelly won the 2003 Carnegie Medal, recognizing the year's outstanding book by a British author for children or young adults. For the 70th anniversary of the Medal a few years later it was named one of the top ten winning works, selected by a panel to compose the ballot for a public election of the all-time favourite.

== Plot summary ==
The novel is written in alternating chapters from the past and present. The novel begins in the present day, with teenaged Mattie Gokey working at The Glenmore, a hotel on Big Moose Lake, to earn money during the summer. One of the hotel guests, Grace Brown, asks Mattie to burn a pack of letters. Later that day, Grace is found dead in the lake near the hotel. Mattie remembers the letters, which she did not have time to burn. She is drawn in by the mystery of what they might say, and she begins to read them. They reveal some shocking information about Grace's lover, Chester Gillette, who checked into the hotel as Carl Grahm. Grace was pregnant with Chester's child at the time, so he killed her.

In the past, Mattie Gokey remembers her life on her family's farm in the Adirondack Mountains of northern New York. In 1906, when she was 16, Mattie dreamed of going to Barnard College. Her best friend, Weaver Smith, shows Mattie's writings to their teacher, Miss Wilcox, who sends an application for Mattie to Barnard. Mattie gets a "full scholarship" but cannot afford to buy the books and a train ticket, or to leave her family's farm. In an attempt to raise the money, Mattie cleans her rich Aunt Josie's house every week, but Aunt Josie refuses to pay her and tells Mattie she is selfish to leave the farm and the family.

Meanwhile, Mattie fends off the romantic advances of her neighbor Royal Loomis. Royal tries to connect with her by giving her a book for her seventeenth birthday. Unfortunately, he gives her a cookbook, which, to Mattie, shows he wants her to be just like other girls.

Mattie makes the choice to leave the North Woods and go to school in New York City. She leaves in the morning, and the only person she tells is Weaver. She writes three letters, one to her father, one to Royal, and one to Weaver's mother. She has made her peace with Grace because she decided to show the letters to the world so now every one can see the true, tragic story of Grace Brown. She is now ready to leave it behind, and keep her life in the North Woods as a memory.

== Major characters ==
- Mattie Gokey: age 16 (she later turns 17), the eldest daughter of a widower farmer, who earns a college scholarship and really wants to become a writer. Mattie states that she is good at telling herself lies, and other characters comment she often seems oblivious to the events going on around her. Mattie believes that she is not courageous like Weaver or Miss Wilcox, but eventually finds the courage to go to New York.
- Emily Baxter/Wilcox: is an unconventional poet who has written poems controversial enough that they have been burned and condemned by the highest authorities. Her husband, who does not approve of Emily's poetry, tries to get her committed and eventually, she flees to Paris. Under the name of Miss Wilcox, she acts as a teacher and friend to the main character, Mattie. She also helps Mattie achieve her dream of going to college.
- Weaver Smith: is the only black boy in the entire area and Mattie's best friend. He worked at the Glenmore Hotel along with Mattie in order to earn money for the train ticket to New York City, where he would attend Columbia University. Weaver is often a source of inspiration and exasperation to Mattie, and they both share a love of books, making Weaver frustrated by Mattie's affections for the inarticulate Royal Loomis.
- Royal Loomis: is a handsome but dull boy who Mattie and many other girls are sweet on. Although he doesn't understand Mattie's love for books and words, after spending some time together, he asks to marry her and she says yes. Mattie, however, returns the ring later on after she decides to go to New York City. Royal harbours bitterness toward Emmie Hubbard and her children, as his father treats Emmie better than he does his wife. In the end, he only liked Mattie because of the possibility of getting her land.
- Minnie Compeau: is Mattie's best girl-friend. She's pregnant with twins, who Mattie helps deliver later on in the plot. Minnie is married to Jim Compeau and they are very much in love, in comparison to Mattie's uncertainty towards Royal.
- Abby, Lou and Beth: are Mattie's three sisters. Beth is the youngest, aged 5, is described to be a noisy, boisterous little girl. Mattie states in the book that she knows Beth will grow up to be 'truly beautiful' someday. Lou is the middle sister, aged 11, and is very wild and tomboyish. Before the death of their mother and their brother Lawton leaving, Lou was very close to their father, and is hurt by the sudden distance between them. She is the only girl out of the four sisters to have her father's blue eyes and black hair, which she shares with Lawton, their brother. Lou frequently cuts her hair out of anger and to suit her boyish attitude. Abby, the second oldest, is 14 and described as being kind but somewhat introverted. She is also a better cook then Mattie is. Mattie, Abby and Beth all have brown hair and eyes, like their mother. Mattie's sisters are another reason why Mattie is torn between going to New York and staying to look after them.
- Emmie Hubbard: is a widow whose farm lies between the Loomis' and the Gokeys. Emmie is considered to be 'the village fruitcake'. She has several children, but most of them have different fathers. Tommy, one of her eldest, is very close to Mattie; she considers him a little brother. Emmie's children often go to their neighbors to beg food off them. When Weaver's mother is attacked near the end of the novel, however, Emmie reforms and repays her kindness by taking care of her. As a result, Emmie's home situation improves and her children begin to help with the farming, being unable to previously due to Emmie's frequently unstable moods. The Loomis family dislikes the Hubbards.
- Aunt Josie: Mattie's rich, stuck up aunt. No matter what Mattie does she cannot please her.
- Table 6: The perverted man at the hotel who indecently exposes himself to the waitresses.
- Cook: The chief at Glenmore. She is pushy, but cares about the waiters.
- Jim Compeau: Minnie's husband. He loves Minnie and their twins.
- Mr. Baxter: Miss Wilcox's husband who doesn't approve of her "free" writing style.
- Mr. Frank Loomis: Father of Royal and his brothers, who is cheating on his wife with Emmie.
- Mrs. Iva Loomis: The stuck-up mother of Royal and his brothers. Mattie says she understands why Mr. Loomis is cheating on her.
- Grace Brown: The body that shows up in Big Moose Lake. A girl who is killed by Chester Gillette and was pregnant with his child.
- Chester Gillette "Carl Grahm": Grace Brown's murderer. He kills Grace by hitting her with a tennis racket to render her unconscious and drowns her in Big Moose Lake by tipping their boat over. No one suspects that it was him.
- Pa (Michael Gokey): The father of Mattie, Lawton, Lou, Beth, and Abby. He is bitter and depressed from the loss of their mother. His French name is Michel Gauthier. He was beaten by his step father and still has many scars to prove it.
- Lawton Gokey: The eldest of the Gokey family children. After getting in an argument with Pa, he left and hasn't been seen since.
- Aleeta Smith: Weaver's mother. Loving and kind, she supports Weaver's wanting to go to Columbia.
- Uncle Fifty: Mattie's uncle who is an alcoholic but is very kind. Sometimes he promises false things while he is drunk, and he travels around the world as a French river man who visits the Gokey family very rarely. He always brings great presents for every member in the family. He promises Mattie money for college but goes back on this promise and spends the money on alcohol and pleasure.

== Awards ==
Beside the British Carnegie, A Northern Light won the 2003 Los Angeles Times Book Prize for Young Adult Literature. The American Young Adult Library Services Association (YALSA) named it one of the year's Top Ten Best Books for Young Adults and it was a runner up for best book in that category, the Michael L. Printz Award.

== Notes ==
Awards
Preceded by Ruby Holler	Carnegie Medal recipient 2003	Succeeded by Millions
