= Camp Nyoda =

Summer camp for girls in Oak Ridge, New Jersey, US

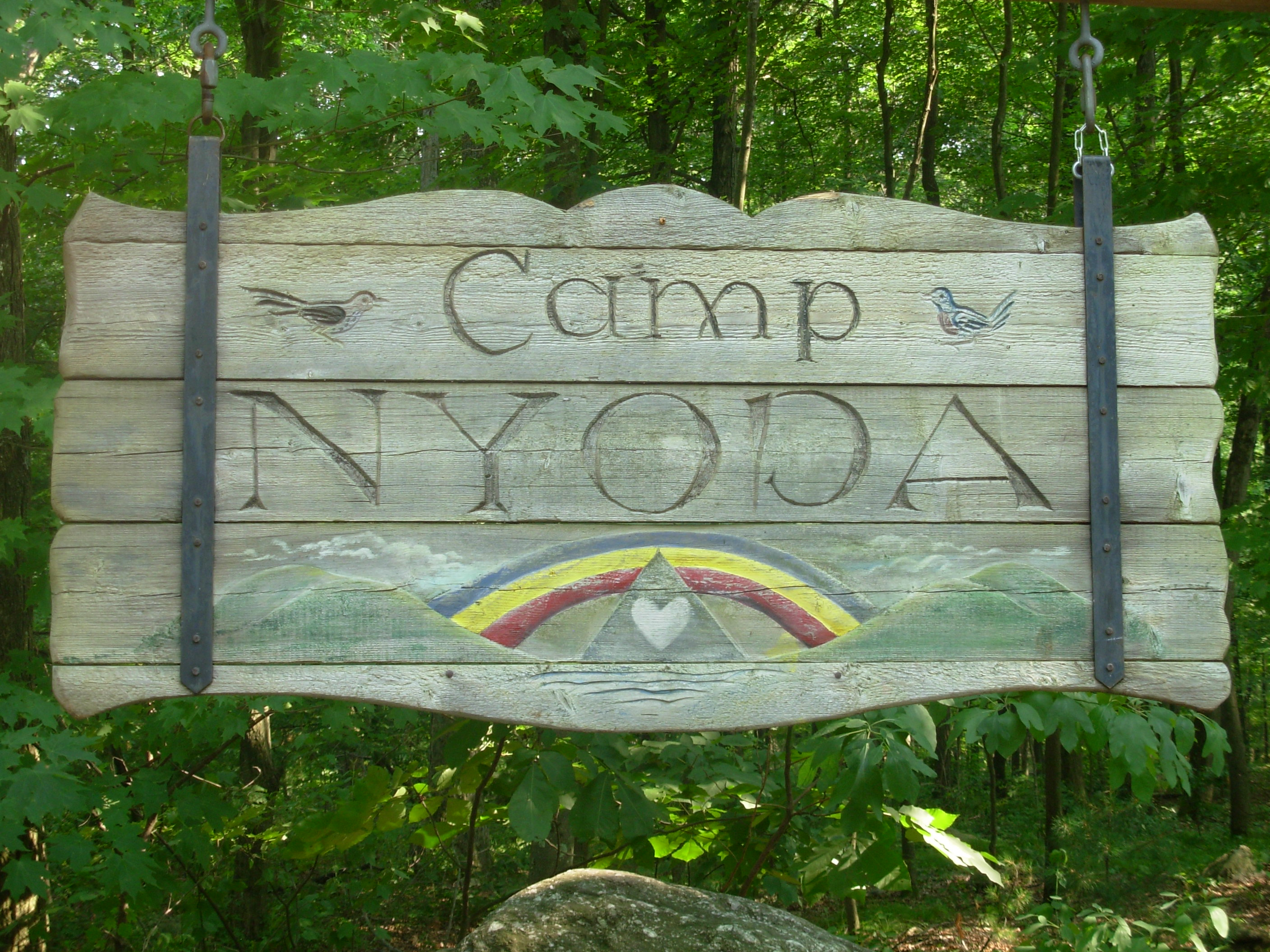
Camp Nyoda roadside sign

Camp Nyoda, located in Oak Ridge, New Jersey, is among the oldest overnight summer camps for girls in the United States. Founded in 1917 by Lee and Grover Smith, Camp Nyoda was initially affiliated with the Camp Fire Girls of America (now called Camp Fire). Though it no longer retains this affiliation, many of Nyoda's songs and traditions can be traced back to its Camp Fire roots. Throughout its history, Nyoda has been continuously owned and led by women - the female descendants of the Smiths and their families.

== History ==
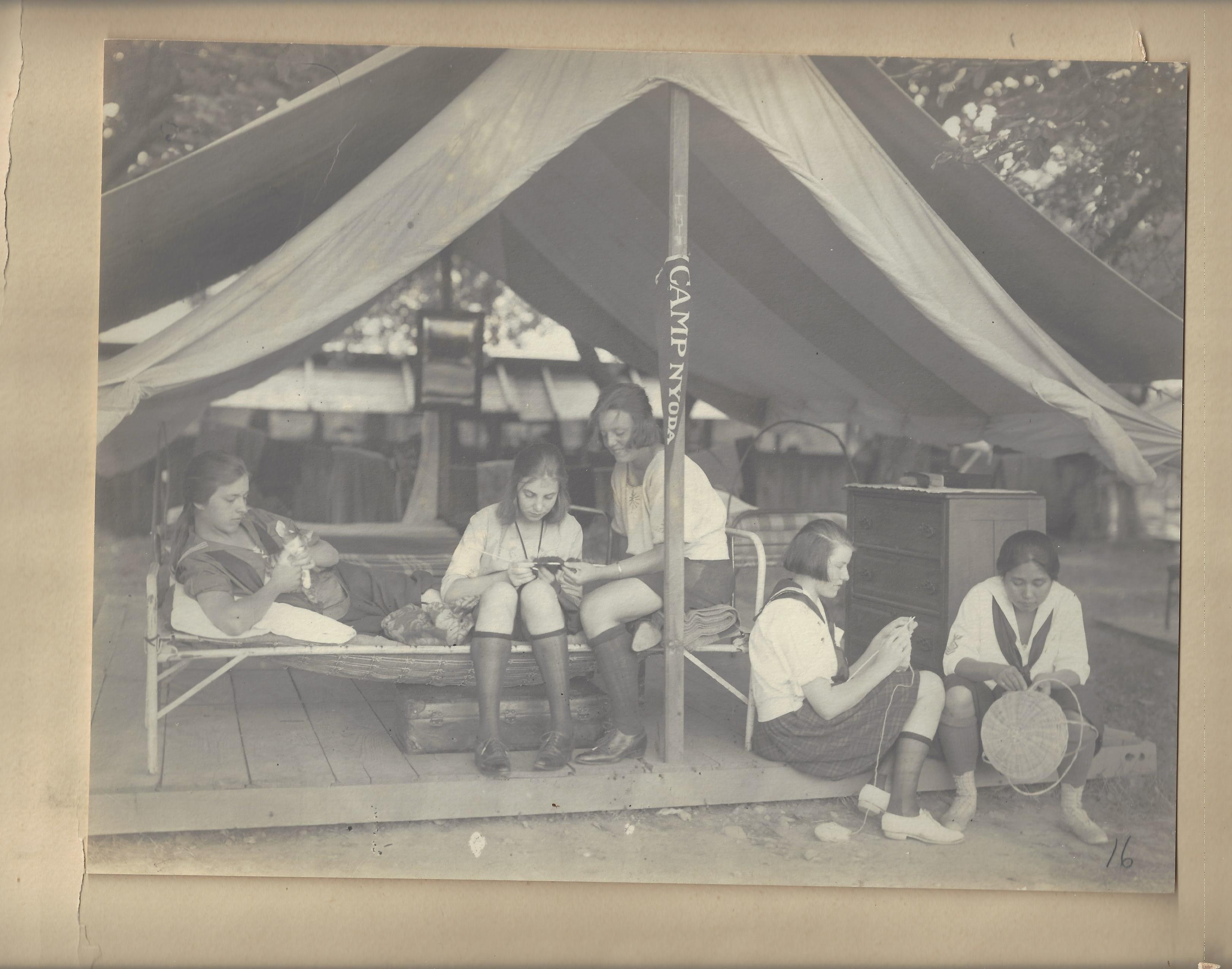
Nyoda girls in their platform tent (photo: Jessie Tarbox Beals)

In 1917, Lee and Grover Smith purchased a 75-acre farm in Jefferson Township, New Jersey, surrounded by the New York-New Jersey Highlands, to serve as the summer camp for the Montclair, New Jersey Camp Fire Girls circle. The group, led by Lee, was composed of her three daughters, Virginia, Madelyn, and Gertrude, and a few of their friends. After a rainbow appeared over the highlands during a thunderstorm, Lee and Grover chose the name Nyoda for the camp because, according to a popular Camp Fire Girls handbook, Nyoda meant rainbow (in an unspecified Native American language).

The girls slept in platform tents until, in the early 1920s, Grover and a crew of residents built seven bungalows to house the growing group of campers. The same men also converted the pre-existing barn into a recreational space and built a wooden dining hall. The family acquired the Winterbottom farm to the north of the property in the mid-1950s, increasing the camp's total size by about 50 acres. In the late 1960s, a shower house was built to replace the single, cold-water, outdoor shower, and a riding ring was added in the late 1990s.

In the early 1950s, Lee passed on the title of Camp Director to her granddaughter, Alice Lee Cooper who, with the help of her husband, John Harold Cooper, and their three daughters Virginia, Margaret, and Barbara, led Nyoda for more than three decades. Her daughter, Peggy Cooper Daly, became Camp Director in 1984. Nyoda's current leadership team includes Alice Lee, her brother Dwight Curley and his wife Gwen, their children and spouses, Peggy's husband Greg Daly and their children, her sisters and their families, Assistant Director Molly Jenkins and her family, and members of the Camp Nyoda Alumnae Association.

Camp Nyoda was recognized by the American Tree Farm System as Outstanding Tree Farmer of the Year in 1995.

On May 15, 2015, four of Nyoda's seven bungalows were consumed in a fire caused by a short circuit. As the summer of 2015 was only a few weeks away, an online donation site was created. Nyoda alumnae and their families and friends raised the funds necessary to rebuild the cabins, making it possible for the 2015 camp season to begin on schedule.

== Camp Nyoda today ==
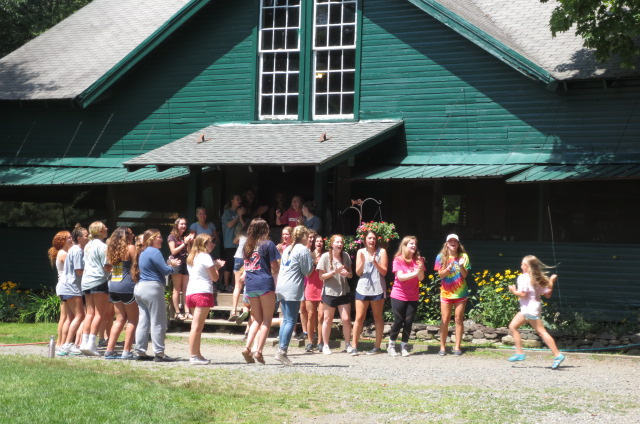
Counselors singing to campers in front of the Dining Room before lunch at Camp Nyoda

The camping season at Nyoda lasts six weeks, from early July through mid-August. While younger girls can stay for one, two, or three-week sessions, many girls stay for the whole six-week season. Most Nyoda campers hail from New Jersey and nearby states, though some travel much further, even internationally. Many current campers were preceded at Nyoda by their sisters, cousins, mothers, aunts, and grandmothers, and alumnae of both older and more recent generations are involved in leadership and service roles each summer.

As many as 100 campers, ages 7–15, can live at Camp Nyoda at a given time, and they are divided into bungalow groups by age. Each group of campers is led by three to five Nyoda counselors, most of whom were campers themselves. The counselors live in the bungalows with the campers and run Nyoda´s activities. The on-site administrative and support team includes the Camp Director, Assistant Director, camp nurse, and kitchen and grounds personnel. Daily activities include swimming, boating, tennis, archery, dance, dramatics, hiking, and horseback riding. Meals and evening activities are camp-wide events. Singing is an integral part of life at Nyoda - at activities, during meals, as part of theatrical productions, and at Goodnight Circle (a time for quiet reflection before bed).

Camp Nyoda dropped its Camp Fire affiliation in the early 1950s, decades before the national organization expanded its membership to include boys, and has chosen to continue as an all-girls camp to this day. However, Camp Fire traditions, such as a weekly Council Fire and non-denominational chapel service on Sundays, are still mainstays of the Nyoda summer schedule. Nyoda's core values find their source in WO-HE-LO, Camp Fire's original watchword, which stands for work, health and love.

== Notable alumnae ==
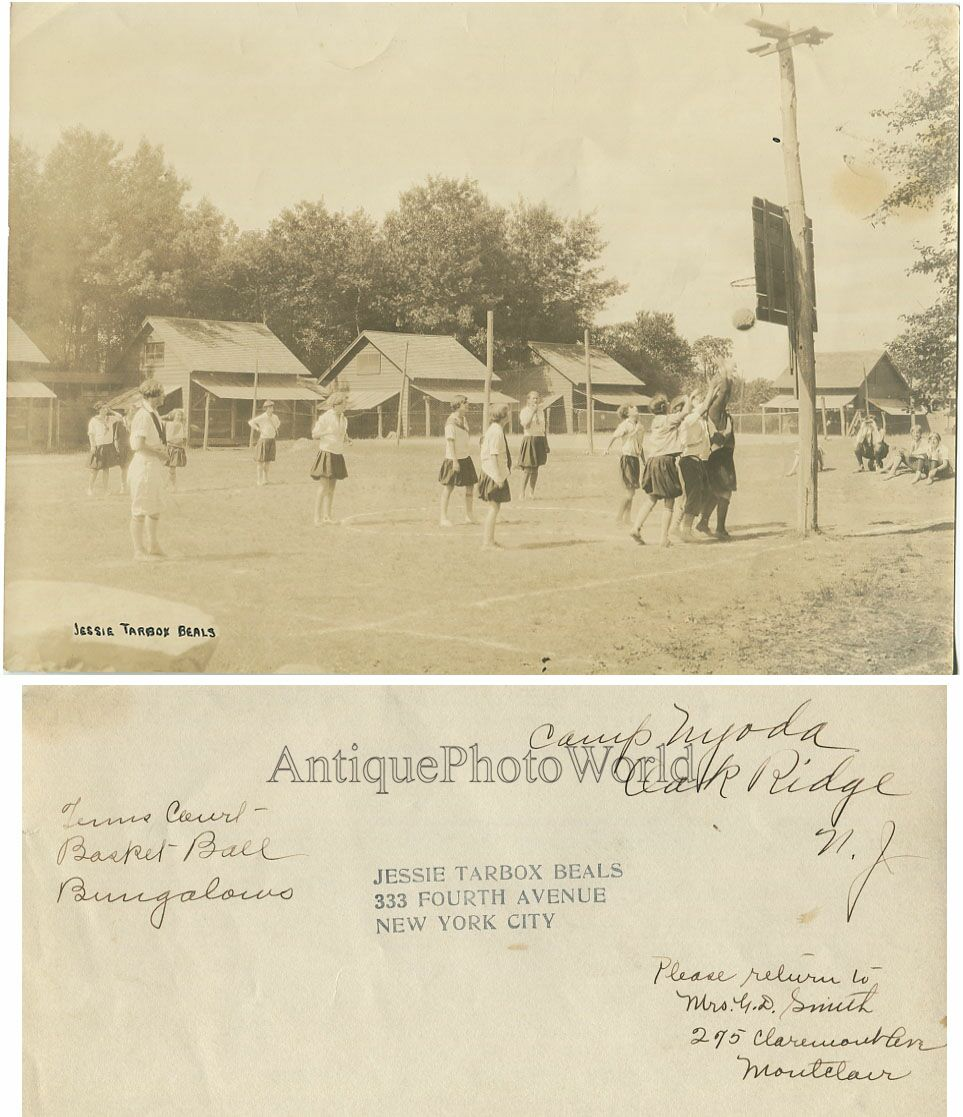
Photo of Camp Nyoda taken by Jessie Tarbox Beals

- Nanette Beals, daughter of Jessie Tarbox Beals, the first published female photojournalist in the United States, was a Nyoda camper. Tarbox Beals was a "patron of the camp" during Nyoda's first decades, taking numerous photographs of Nyoda, as well as writing several poems and songs about Nyoda and the Smith Family, including her "Toast to Chi-Wu" (Lee Smith's Camp Fire name) and a song about the station wagon Henrietta, that was "...the pet of the Camp Fire Girls at Camp Nyoda, in Northern New Jersey".
- Anne LaBastille, American author, ecologist, and photographer, was a Nyoda alumna and makes reference to her Camp Fire experience in her book Woodswoman: "Survival in a log cabin in the woods as a lone woman falls into three categories. They are simply the three rules for a full, good life that I learned as a Camp Fire Girl years ago. They are work, health and love." Her ceremonial dress, worn during Council Fire when Nyoda was still affiliated with Camp Fire, is on display at the Adirondack Experience, a museum dedicated to preserving the history of the Adirondacks.
