= An American Tragedy =

1925 novel by Theodore Dreiser

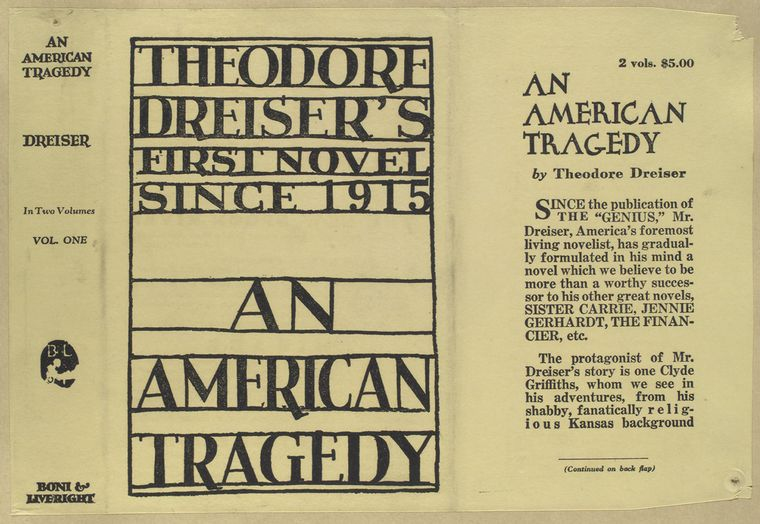
- Dust jacket of a 1926 edition published by Boni & Liveright
- Author: Theodore Dreiser
- Language: English
- Genre: Crime fiction Tragedy
- Publisher: Boni & Liveright
- Publication date: December 17, 1925
- Publication place: US
- Dewey Decimal: 813.52

An American Tragedy is a 1925 novel by American writer Theodore Dreiser. He began the manuscript in the summer of 1920, but a year later, abandoned most of that text. It was based on the notorious murder of Grace Brown in 1906, and the trial of her lover, Chester Gillette. In 1923 Dreiser returned to the project and, with the help of his future wife Helen and editor-secretaries Louise Campbell and Sally Kusell, completed the massive novel in 1925. The book entered the public domain in the United States on January 1, 2021.

== Plot ==
Clyde Griffiths is raised by poor and devoutly religious parents to help in their street missionary work. As a young man, Clyde, to help support his family, must take menial jobs as a soda jerk, then a bellhop at a prestigious Kansas City hotel. There, his more sophisticated colleagues introduce him to bouts of social drinking and sex with prostitutes.

Enjoying his new lifestyle, Clyde becomes infatuated with Hortense Briggs, who manipulates him into buying her expensive gifts. When Clyde learns Hortense goes out with other men, he becomes jealous. Nevertheless, he would rather spend money on her than to help his sister, who had eloped, only to end up pregnant and abandoned by her lover.

Clyde's life changes dramatically when his friend Sparser, driving Clyde, Hortense, and other friends back from a secluded rendezvous in the country in his boss's car, used without permission, hits a little girl and kills her. Fleeing from the police at high speed, Sparser crashes the car. Everyone but Sparser and his partner flee the scene of the crime. Clyde leaves Kansas City, fearing prosecution as an accessory to Sparser's crimes.

While working as a bellboy at an exclusive club in Chicago, he meets his wealthy uncle Samuel Griffiths, the owner of a shirt-collar factory in the fictional city of Lycurgus, New York. Samuel, feeling guilt for neglecting his poor relations, offers Clyde a menial job at the factory. After that, he promotes Clyde to a minor supervisory role.

Samuel Griffiths's son Gilbert, Clyde's immediate supervisor, warns Clyde that as a manager, he should not consort with women working under his supervision. At the same time, the Griffithses pay Clyde little attention socially. As Clyde has no close friends in Lycurgus, he becomes lonely. Emotionally vulnerable, Clyde is drawn to Roberta Alden, a poor and innocent farm girl working in his shop, who falls in love with him. Clyde secretly courts Roberta, ultimately getting her pregnant.

At the same time, elegant young socialite Sondra Finchley, daughter of another Lycurgus factory owner, takes an interest in Clyde despite his cousin Gilbert's efforts to keep them apart. Clyde's engaging manner makes him popular among the young smart set of Lycurgus; Sondra and he become close, and he courts her while neglecting Roberta. Roberta expects Clyde to marry her to avert the shame of an unwed pregnancy, but Clyde now dreams, instead, of marrying Sondra.

Having failed to procure an abortion for Roberta, Clyde gives her no more than desultory help with living expenses while his relationship with Sondra matures. When Roberta threatens to reveal her relationship with Clyde unless he marries her, he plans to murder her by drowning while they go boating. He had read a local newspaper report of a boating accident.

Clyde takes Roberta out in a canoe on the fictional Big Bittern Lake (modeled on Big Moose Lake, New York) in the Adirondacks, and rows to a secluded bay. He freezes. Sensing something wrong, Roberta moves toward him, and he unintentionally strikes her in the face with a camera, stunning her and accidentally capsizing the boat. Roberta, unable to swim, drowns, while Clyde, unwilling to save her, swims to shore. The narrative implies that the blow was accidental, but the trail of circumstantial evidence left by the panicky and guilt-ridden Clyde points to murder.

The local authorities are eager to convict Clyde, to the point of manufacturing additional evidence against him, and he repeatedly incriminates himself with his confused and contradictory testimony. Despite a vigorous (and untruthful) defense by two lawyers hired by his uncle, Clyde is convicted, sentenced to death, and after an appeal is denied, he is executed by electric chair.

== Influences and characteristics ==
Dreiser based the book on a notorious criminal case. On July 11, 1906, resort owners found an overturned boat and the body of Grace Brown at Big Moose Lake in the Adirondack Mountains of Upstate New York. Chester Gillette was put on trial, and convicted of killing Brown, though he claimed that her death was a suicide. Gillette was executed by electric chair on March 30, 1908. The murder trial drew international attention when Brown's love letters to Gillette were read in court. Dreiser saved newspaper clippings about the case for several years before writing his novel, during which he studied the case closely. He based Clyde Griffiths on Chester Gillette, deliberately giving him the same initials.

The historical location of most of the central events was Cortland, New York, a city situated in Cortland County in a region replete with place names resonant of Greco-Roman history. Townships include Homer, Solon, Virgil, Marathon, and Cincinnatus. Lycurgus, the pseudonym given to Cortland, was the legendary law-giver of ancient Sparta. Grace Brown, a farm girl from the small town of South Otselic in adjacent Chenango County, was the factory girl who was Gillette's lover. The place where Grace was killed, Big Moose Lake in the Adirondacks, was called Big Bittern Lake in Dreiser's novel.

A strikingly similar murder took place in Wilkes-Barre, Pennsylvania, in 1934, when Robert Edwards clubbed Freda McKechnie, one of his two lovers, and placed her body in a lake. The cases were so similar that the press at the time dubbed the Edwards/McKechnie murder "The American Tragedy". Edwards was eventually found guilty, and also executed by electric chair.

The novel is a tragedy, Clyde's destruction being the consequence of his innate weaknesses - moral and physical cowardice, lack of scruples and self-discipline, muddled intellect, and unfocused ambition; additionally, the effect of his ingratiating (Dreiser uses the word "soft") social manner places temptation in his way, which he cannot resist.

This novel is full of symbolism, ranging from Clyde's grotesque description of the high, gloomy walls of the factory as an opportunity for success, symbolizing how it is all a mirage, to the description of girls as "electrifying" to foreshadow Clyde's destination to the electric chair; Dreiser transforms everyday mundane objects to symbols.

Dreiser sustains readers' interest in the lengthy novel (over 800 pages) by the accumulation of detail, and by continually varying the "emotional distance" of his writing from Clyde and other characters, from detailed examination of their thoughts and motivations to dispassionate reportage.

== Adaptations ==
The novel has been adapted several times into other forms, and the storyline has been used, not always attributed, as the basis for other works:

- A first stage adaptation written by Patrick Kearney for Broadway premiered at the Longacre Theatre in New York on October 11, 1926. In the cast was actress Miriam Hopkins, who had not yet started her film career.
- Sergei Eisenstein prepared a screenplay in the late 1920s, which he hoped to have produced by Paramount or by Charlie Chaplin during Eisenstein's stay in Hollywood in 1930. Foolish Wives and Greed director Erich von Stroheim briefly considered directing a film version in the 1920s. Dreiser strongly disapproved of the 1931 film version directed by Josef von Sternberg.
- In April 1929, Dreiser agreed that German director Erwin Piscator should produce a stage version of An American Tragedy. Piscator's stage adaptation premiered in Vienna in April 1932, and made its US debut in April 1935 at the Hedgerow Theatre, Rose Valley. The play was produced, as well, by Lee Strasberg at the Group Theatre in March 1936. A revival was produced by the Hedgerow Theatre in September 2010.
- In the 1940s, the novel inspired an episode of the award-winning old-time radio comedy Our Miss Brooks, an episode known as "Weekend at Crystal Lake", or "An American Tragedy". The episode revolved around the characters' misinterpreting the intentions of biology teacher Philip Boyton (played by Jeff Chandler), Connie Brooks's (Eve Arden) high-school colleague and love interest. The characters fear that Boynton plans to kill Miss Brooks during a leisurely weekend at their boss's lakeside retreat. The episode was broadcast twice, on September 19, 1948, and on August 21, 1949. The episode was also repeated in 1955, when the show was a hit on both radio and television.
- The 1951 Paramount Pictures film A Place in the Sun, directed by George Stevens and starring Montgomery Clift, Elizabeth Taylor, and Shelley Winters, is "[b]ased on the novel "An American Tragedy" by Theodore Dreiser and the Patrick Kearney play adapted from the novel" (quoted from film credits).
- Further television or film adaptations of An American Tragedy have been produced in Brazil (Um Lugar ao Sol, TV series, 1959, director: Dionísio Azevedo), Italy ("it:Una tragedia americana", Rai 1, 1962, director: Anton Giulio Majano), Czechoslovakia (Americká tragédia, TV series, 1976, director: Stanislav Párnický), Philippines (Nakaw Na Pag-ibig, film, 1980, director: Lino Brocka), USSR (Американская трагедия, 4 parts, Lithuanian Film Studio, 1981, director: Marijonas Giedrys), and Japan (Hi no ataru basho, TV series, 1982, director: Masami Ryuji).
- Composer Tobias Picker adapted the material as an opera of the same title, with a libretto by Gene Scheer. It premiered at the Metropolitan Opera starring Nathan Gunn in New York on December 2, 2005.
- Critics and commentators have compared elements of Woody Allen's film, Match Point (2005), to the central plot of the novel.
- The novel was adapted as a musical of the same title by three-time Tony Award-winning composer and lyricist Charles Strouse. It premiered at Muhlenberg College, located in Allentown, Pennsylvania, on March 24, 2010.
- In Cuba, the novel has been adapted and broadcast by Radio Progreso national broadcasting twice, in 1977 and 2001. The first of the versions starred such renowned actors as Raul Selis (as Clyde), Martha del Rio (Roberta), Miriam Mier (Sondra), Julio Alberto Casanova (Gilbert), and Maggie Castro (Bertine).
- Jennifer Donnelly's 2003 young-adult novel, A Northern Light, recounts the events from the narrative viewpoint of a young woman working at the local camp.
- In 2021, the classic crime novel was reimagined in the form of a fictional investigative docuseries in The Anatomy of Desire by L. R. Dorn, the pen name of screenwriting team Matt Dorff and Suzanne Dunn.

== Reception ==
=== Awards ===
In 2005, the book was placed in Time's list of the top 100 novels written in English since 1924.

=== Controversy ===
In 1927, the book was banned in Boston, Massachusetts, due to sexual content, abortion, and murder.

In 1933, it was burned by Nazis in Germany because it "deals with low love affairs".
