= 4th Directors Guild of America Awards =

- Date: 1952
- Country: United States
- Presented by: Directors Guild of America

Highlights
- Best Director Feature Film: A Place in the Sun – George Stevens
- Website: https://www.dga.org/Awards/History/1950s/1951.aspx?value=1951

The 4th Directors Guild of America Awards, honoring the outstanding directorial achievements in film in 1951, were presented in 1952.

== Winners and nominees ==
=== Film ===
Feature Film

George Stevens – A Place in the Sun

- László Benedek – Death of a Salesman
- Michael Gordon – Cyrano de Bergerac
- Alfred Hitchcock – Strangers on a Train
- Elia Kazan – A Streetcar Named Desire
- Henry King – David and Bathsheba
- Mervyn LeRoy – Quo Vadis
- Anatole Litvak – Decision Before Dawn
- Vincente Minnelli – An American in Paris
- George Sidney – Show Boat
- Richard Thorpe – The Great Caruso
- William Wyler – Detective Story

=== Special awards ===
Honorary Life Member Recipient

Louis B. Mayer
