= An American Tragedy (film) =

1931 film

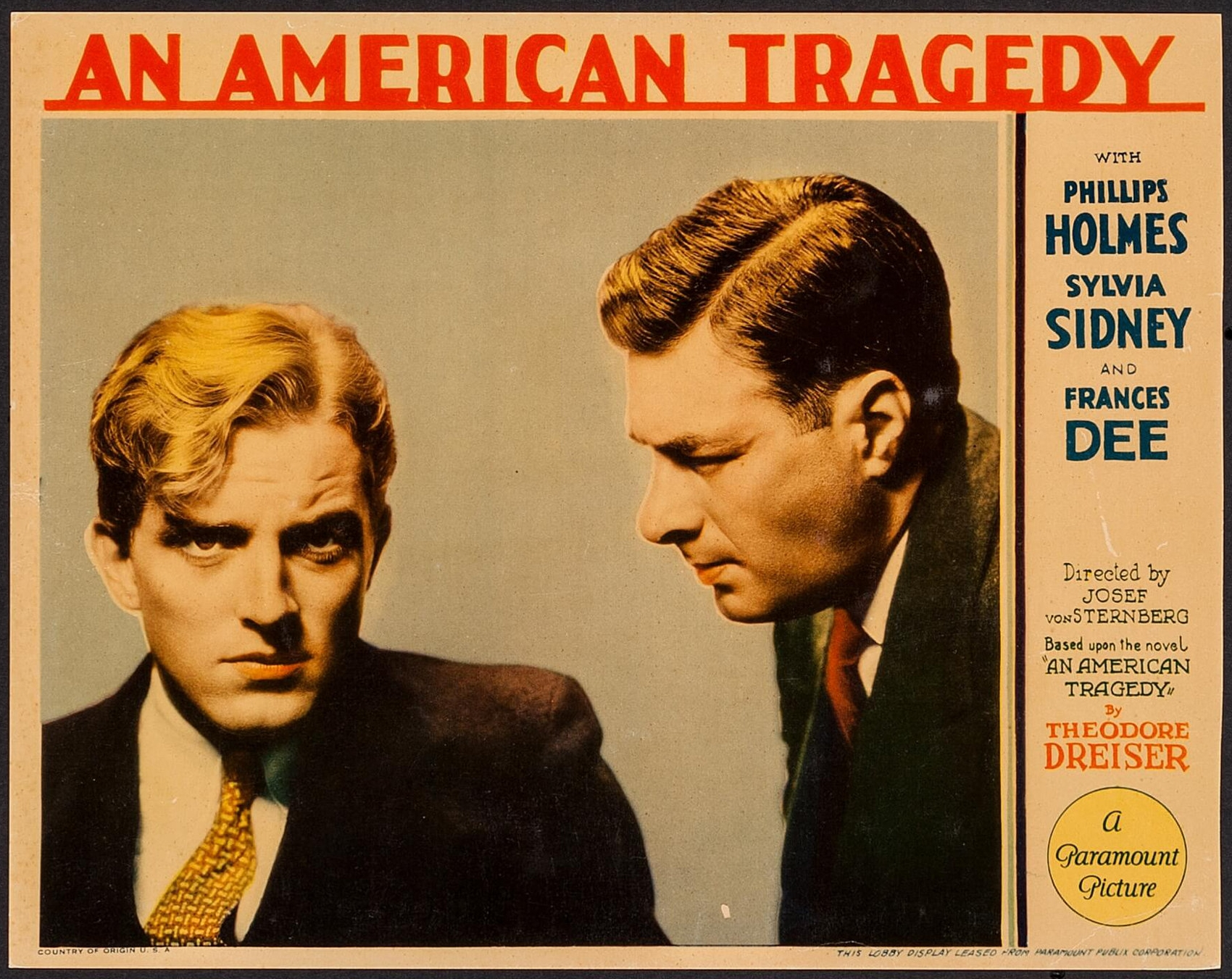
- Lobby card
- Directed by: Josef von Sternberg
- Screenplay by: Samuel Hoffenstein
- Based on: An American Tragedy by Theodore Dreiser
- Produced by: Josef von Sternberg
- Starring: Phillips Holmes; Sylvia Sidney; Frances Dee
- Cinematography: Lee Garmes
- Music by: John Leipold; Ralph Rainger
- Production company: Paramount Pictures
- Distributed by: Paramount Pictures
- Release date: August 22, 1931
- Running time: 96 minutes
- Country: United States
- Language: English

An American Tragedy is a 1931 American pre-Code drama film directed by Josef von Sternberg and produced and distributed by Paramount Pictures. It is based on Theodore Dreiser's 1925 novel An American Tragedy and its 1926 stage adaptation, which were inspired by the historic 1906 murder of Grace Brown by Chester Gillette at Big Moose Lake in upstate New York. Dreiser's novel would again be adapted by Paramount as the 1951 film A Place in the Sun.

== Plot ==
Clyde Griffiths, a bellhop at a fancy hotel in Kansas City, is the neglected son of street evangelists. He is dating one of the hotel's maids, though he yearns for a place in society. One night, he and some friends are involved in a drunk-driving crash in which a little girl is killed. They all flee the scene, and Clyde eventually ends up as a bellboy at a hotel in Chicago.

When Clyde's wealthy uncle, Samuel Griffiths, stays at the hotel, Clyde approaches him, and, though they do not know each other well, Samuel agrees to give his nephew a job in his shirt factory in (fictional) Lycurgus, New York. Clyde does well and is promoted to foreman of the collar stamping department, which is staffed only by women. Fraternization is strictly prohibited, but Clyde, frustrated by being shut out of his uncle's social circle, soon begins seeing Roberta "Bert" Alden, a newly hired stamper recently arrived in the city from her parents' upstate farm.

The secret relationship between Clyde and Bert flourishes during spring and summer, when they spend most of their dates outdoors, but when winter comes, he pressures her to allow him to meet with her in her room, where he seduces her. Shortly after this, Clyde meets the beautiful debutante Sondra Finchley, and he quickly falls for her and begins to spend less and less time with Bert.

Bert discovers she is pregnant and begs Clyde to marry her to spare her the shame of a child born out of wedlock, but he repeatedly puts her off and suggests she return home, claiming he will marry her later. Sondra, meanwhile, promises Clyde she will marry him as soon as she comes of age in October.

There is a story in the newspaper about an accidental drowning, and it gives Clyde an idea for how to rid himself of Bert, who he knows cannot swim. He invites her for a weekend in the Adirondacks, supposedly to get married. After traveling around for a few days using pseudonyms, Clyde takes Bert out on a lake in a canoe, but he is unable to bring himself to push her overboard. Bert notices Clyde is acting strangely, however, and he admits he had planned to drown her, but says he has changed his mind and will marry her. She is upset and stands up, overturning the canoe. Looking back only once, Clyde swims to the shore, leaving Bert to drown.

The police and district attorney discover Bert's true identity and follow a trail of evidence that leads to Clyde, and they find love letters in his home from both Bert and Sondra, establishing his motive. Clyde is arrested and charged with first-degree murder, and his lengthy trial draws national attention. Encouraged by his lawyers, who say his last-minute change of heart makes him innocent, he denies planning Bert's death, but the district attorney presents evidence to the contrary, and Clyde is convicted and sentenced to death in the electric chair.

Just after the sentencing, Clyde is visited by his mother, who begs him to tell her the truth. He tells her that, while did not kill Bert, neither did he save her, though he could have, because he wanted her dead. His mother, heartbroken, says it is her fault for bringing him up in evil surroundings, neglecting him while working to save the souls of others. She tells him to be brave and face his punishment like a man, and they embrace through the bars of Clyde's cell.

== Cast ==
- Phillips Holmes as Clyde Griffiths
- Sylvia Sidney as Roberta "Bert" Alden
- Frances Dee as Sondra Finchley
- Irving Pichel as District Attorney Orville Mason
- Frederick Burton as Samuel Griffiths, Clyde's uncle
- Claire McDowell as Mrs. Samuel Griffiths
- Wallace Middleton as Gilbert Griffiths, Clyde's cousin
- Emmett Corrigan as Belknap, one of Clyde's lawyers
- Charles B. Middleton as Jephson, Clyde's other lawyer
- Lucille La Verne as Mrs. Asa Griffiths, Clyde's mother
- Albert Hart as Titus Alden, Bert's father
- Fanny Midgley as Mrs. Alden, Bert's mother
- Arnold Korff as Judge Oberwaltzer
- Russell Powell as Coroner Fred Heit
- William Bailey as Reporter in Courtroom (uncredited)
- Ed Brady as Train Brakeman (uncredited)
- Richard Cramer as Deputy Sheriff Kraut (uncredited)
- Claire Dodd as Gaile Warren (uncredited)
- George Irving as Mr. Finchley (uncredited)
- Arline Judge as Bella Griffiths (uncredited)
- Guy Oliver as Simeon Dinsmore (uncredited)
- Evelyn Peirce as Bertine Cranston (uncredited)
- Harry Stubbs as Court Clerk (uncredited)
- Nella Walker as Hotel Guest (uncredited)

== Background ==
Paramount Pictures purchased the film rights for Theodore Dreiser's 1925 novel An American Tragedy for $150,000. The widely acclaimed Russian director Sergei Eisenstein was hired to film the adaptation, with Dreiser's enthusiastic support. When Eisenstein was unable to procure studio approval for his "deterministic treatment" reflecting a Marxist perspective, he abandoned the project.

Paramount, with $500,000 already invested in the film, enlisted Josef von Sternberg to develop and direct his own film version of the novel. Dreiser, who was guaranteed by contract the right to review the script before production, complained bitterly that the Sternberg-Hoffenstein interpretation of his novel's themes "outraged the book." When the film was completed, it was clear that the Sternberg screenplay had rejected any interpretation attributing protagonist Clyde Griffiths' antisocial behavior to a capitalist society and a strict religious upbringing, but rather located the problem in "the sexual hypocrisy of the [petty-bourgeois] social class." As Sternberg acknowledged in his memoirs: "I eliminated the sociological elements, which, in my opinion, were far from being responsible for the dramatic accident with which Dreiser concerned himself." Dreiser unsuccessfully sued Paramount to suppress the film.

== Reception ==
According to film historian John Baxter, An American Tragedy "met with mixed critical success. The New York Times called it 'emphatically stirring', the New York Daily News wrote it is 'intensely dramatic, moving, superbly acted', but many other papers, recalling Dreiser's protest, found the film less intense than the original novel, which is undoubtedly the case."

Marxist film critic Harry Alan Potamkin commented on "Sternberg's failure to understand Dreiser's larger thematic purpose: Before the story opens [Sternberg presents] repeated shots of water disturbed by a thrown object. And throughout the picture the captions are composed upon a background of rippling water. Sternberg saw the major idea of the matter [theme] in the drowning. How lamentable!"

The film fared poorly at American theaters, but was well received by European moviegoers.

== Theme ==
John Baxter identified the struggle for human control over their destinies as a thematic element in the film:

Throughout Sternberg's films we see fictional worlds where an individual's established identity and position in the social order is so fragile as to be essentially illusory. In An American Tragedy, the beautifully articulated sequence of the police capturing Clyde Griffiths succinctly illustrates Sternberg's sense that life is dominated by forces so far beyond human control as to have an ultimately natural, even cosmic dimension.

Critic Andrew Sarris singled out the following scene for its thematic significance:

The one key scene in the film takes place in the factory where Phillip Holmes (Clyde) arranges the seduction of Sylvia Sidney (Roberta). He has forced her to capitulate by threatening never to see her again. She hands him a note when he passes by the assembly line where she is working. Holmes furtively opens the note in a secluded spot where his expression cannot be seen by the factory girls, and a smile of triumph flickers across his normally phlegmatic features. Since he is seen at [a cinematically] objective distance, he is irrevocably guilty at that very moment for his sexual presumption.
