= Corbin, Montana =

- Ghost town
- Location within Montana Location within the United States
- Coordinates: 46°22′50″N 112°03′43″W
- Country: United States
- State: Montana
- County: Jefferson
- Elevation: 4,775 ft (1,455 m)

Population
  - Total: N/A
- Time zone: UTC-7 (Mountain (MST))
  - Summer (DST): UTC-6 (MDT)
- Area code: 406
- GNIS feature ID: 770091

Corbin is an unincorporated community and ghost town in Jefferson County, Montana, United States, approximately two miles (3 km) west of Jefferson City. It is accessible from the Interstate 15 Jefferson City interchange and following Corbin Road. Corbin is part of the Helena micropolitan area.

== History ==
Corbin was an important mining town in the 1890s and included a stamp mill and heavy infrastructure for the time which yielded decent amounts of gold and silver. It was part of the Wickes-Corbin Mining District along with the town of Wickes. The area was prosperous with the development of silver-lead deposits by the Alta Montana Company which later became Samuel T. Hauser’s Helena Mining & Reduction Company. The mining company platted the town in 1884 and named it for prospector D.C. Corbin.

Alta Mine was one of Montana's richest silver mines and the concentrator to process ore was built in Corbin. A concentrator is where the ore is separated from other materials and transformed into usable raw material. It handled 125 tons of ore every day. Silver prices plummeted in 1893 and the rail service between Wickes and Helena closed in 1900, both causing a decline in the town's economy. Still two more smelters were built in Corbin, one in 1896 and one in 1925.

A post office was active in Corbin from 1887 until 1943.

Today the Alta mine is no longer in operation and Corbin is a ghost town. Many of the historic structures still stand with some having been preserved and some residences occupied.

The historic Corbin railroad trestle is still standing. The original trestle was built in 1888 out of wood and was part of the Great Northern Railway. It was replaced by steel in 1901. In 1982 it was abandoned and Jefferson County took possession.
