= Big Moose Lake =

Glacial lake in upstate New York, United States

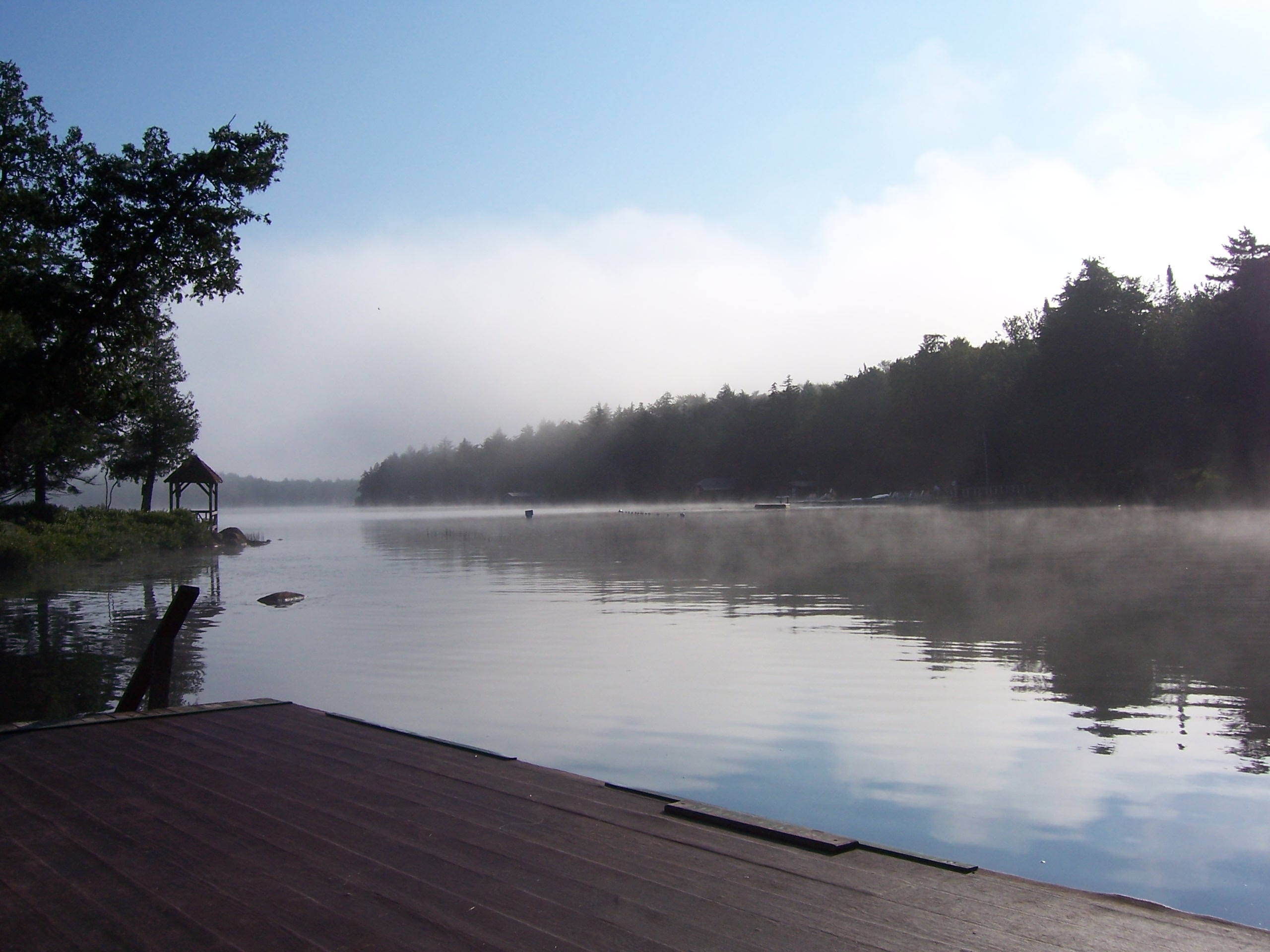
- Big Moose Lake, as seen from its outlet

- Location within New York
- Location: Webb and Long Lake Townships, Herkimer and Hamilton Counties, New York, U.S.
- Coordinates: 43°49′01″N 74°51′17″W
- Type: Glacial
- Primary outflows: North Branch Moose River
- Basin countries: United States
- Max. length: 3 mi (4.8 km)
- Max. width: 1 mi (1.6 km)
- Surface area: 1,242 acres (5.03 km^{2})
- Average depth: 23 ft (7.0 m)
- Max. depth: 85 ft (26 m)
- Surface elevation: 1,824 ft (556 m)
- Islands: 2 Echo Island; Retter Island
- Settlements: Big Moose

Big Moose Lake is a glacial lake in the Adirondacks in upstate New York. Lying within the Adirondack State Park, it sits at the head of the Moose River about five miles (8 km) north of Fourth Lake northeast of the hamlet of Big Moose. The lake falls within both Herkimer and Hamilton counties, and covers portions of the towns of Webb and Long Lake.

== Geography ==
Located in the central-western part of the Adirondack region, Big Moose Lake covers 1,242 acres (5.03 km^{2}) in surface area. It is approximately three miles (4.8 km) long and almost one mile (1.6 km) wide, running in an east–west direction along its major axis. The lake ranges in depth from 30 to 70 feet (9 to 21 m) in its deepest parts, with an average depth of 23 feet (7 m).

=== Climate ===
In the summer, temperatures average from nightly lows of 45 °F (7 °C) to daytime highs of nearly 80 °F (27 °C). In winter, the lake completely freezes over, and temperatures during the day reach an average high of 20 °F (−7 °C) and an average nightly low of 5 to 10 °F (−15 to −12 °C).

Climate data for Big Moose, New York, 1991–2020 normals: 1760ft (536m)
Month	Jan	Feb	Mar	Apr	May	Jun	Jul	Aug	Sep	Oct	Nov	Dec	Year
Record high °F (°C)	59 (15)	60 (16)	78 (26)	88 (31)	91 (33)	92 (33)	92 (33)	93 (34)	95 (35)	82 (28)	69 (21)	60 (16)	95 (35)
Mean maximum °F (°C)	49 (9)	49 (9)	60 (16)	74 (23)	84 (29)	87 (31)	88 (31)	86 (30)	84 (29)	76 (24)	63 (17)	50 (10)	89 (32)
Mean daily maximum °F (°C)	27.9 (−2.3)	31.4 (−0.3)	40.0 (4.4)	53.8 (12.1)	67.6 (19.8)	75.2 (24.0)	78.8 (26.0)	78.3 (25.7)	71.4 (21.9)	57.7 (14.3)	44.1 (6.7)	32.6 (0.3)	54.9 (12.7)
Daily mean °F (°C)	17.4 (−8.1)	18.9 (−7.3)	27.9 (−2.3)	41.2 (5.1)	54.5 (12.5)	62.6 (17.0)	66.5 (19.2)	65.4 (18.6)	58.6 (14.8)	46.4 (8.0)	34.6 (1.4)	23.4 (−4.8)	43.1 (6.2)
Mean daily minimum °F (°C)	6.9 (−13.9)	6.4 (−14.2)	15.7 (−9.1)	28.5 (−1.9)	41.3 (5.2)	50.0 (10.0)	54.2 (12.3)	52.5 (11.4)	45.8 (7.7)	35.2 (1.8)	25.2 (−3.8)	14.1 (−9.9)	31.3 (−0.4)
Mean minimum °F (°C)	−27 (−33)	−22 (−30)	−15 (−26)	9 (−13)	25 (−4)	34 (1)	40 (4)	38 (3)	29 (−2)	19 (−7)	4 (−16)	−15 (−26)	−30 (−34)
Record low °F (°C)	−45 (−43)	−38 (−39)	−29 (−34)	−4 (−20)	17 (−8)	25 (−4)	32 (0)	30 (−1)	18 (−8)	8 (−13)	−18 (−28)	−38 (−39)	−45 (−43)
Average precipitation inches (mm)	3.99 (101)	2.91 (74)	3.07 (78)	3.56 (90)	4.71 (120)	4.57 (116)	4.69 (119)	4.47 (114)	4.43 (113)	5.52 (140)	3.78 (96)	4.07 (103)	49.77 (1,264)
Average snowfall inches (cm)	40.90 (103.9)	34.00 (86.4)	23.20 (58.9)	6.00 (15.2)	0.20 (0.51)	0.00 (0.00)	0.00 (0.00)	0.00 (0.00)	0.00 (0.00)	2.00 (5.1)	12.50 (31.8)	34.70 (88.1)	153.5 (389.91)
Source 1: NOAA
Source 2: XMACIS (records & monthly max/mins)

== History ==
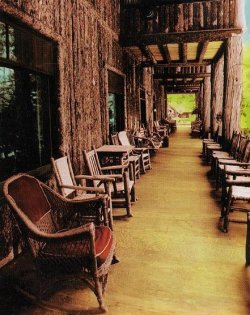
Vertical, half-log (palisade) architecture at Covewood Lodge

The lake's region was settled primarily during the late 19th and early 20th centuries, as people gained access to the region by the first railroad constructed through the uninhabited Adirondack Mountain wilderness. Early trappers and hunters became guides there, eventually establishing permanent camps and hotels. Wealthy businessmen built large, private summer homes and their families lived here for the season, in the style of the Great Camps of the Vanderbilts and Morgans. Some of these lodges still exist.

The Big Moose Lake area is historically significant for its palisade architectural style, which used vertical half-log construction in lodges and cabins.

=== Historic places ===
The following places are listed on the National Register of Historic Places:

- Covewood Lodge (listed in 2004)
- Big Moose Community Chapel (listed in 2012)

== Communities and recreation ==
The hamlet of Big Moose is located southwest of the lake. Other nearby communities include Eagle Bay, Inlet, Old Forge, and Thendara. With minimal road access, the lake's shore is not highly developed. The population reaches a peak during the summer months when vacationers arrive to stay at summer homes or local resorts.

The lake and its surrounding region are a popular spot for tourists year-round; boating, water-skiing, hiking and train rides from Thendara are available in the summer, and cross-country skiing and snowmobiling take place in the winter. It is home to the Big Moose Water Ski Club, whose members are residents of the region.

The 50,100-acre (203 km^{2}) Pigeon Lake Wilderness Area lies just east of the lake.

== Fishing ==
Big Moose lake also offers sport fishing opportunities for brook trout, lake trout, yellow perch, brown trout, and splake. There is a no state-owned boat launch; however, a commercial marina with a ramp is located on the south shore of West Bay.

== In popular culture ==
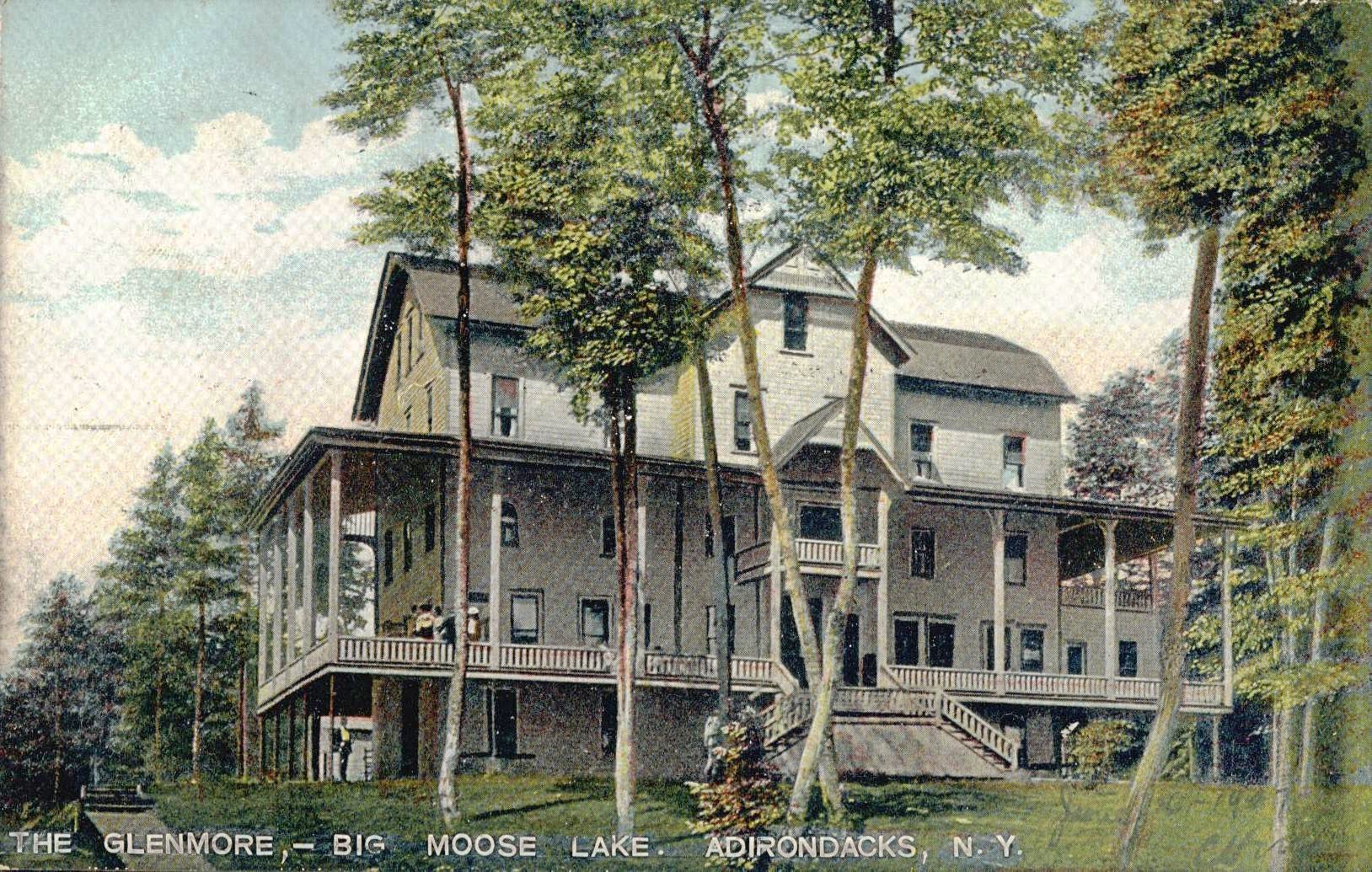
The Glenmore, from a 1907 postcard.

Big Moose Lake was the setting of An American Tragedy, a novel by Theodore Dreiser. He based his book on the historic events of the drowning murder of Grace Brown in the South Bay of Big Moose Lake in the early part of the 20th century. Her boyfriend Chester Gillette was convicted and executed for her murder. (Dreiser named the lake where the murder took place as Big Bittern Lake, after having visited Big Moose Lake, and used it as a model for his fictional version.)

A Place in the Sun, a film starring Elizabeth Taylor, Shelley Winters, and Montgomery Clift, was an adaptation of the novel and won six Academy Awards and the first ever Golden Globe Award for Best Motion Picture – Drama.

Jennifer Donnelly based her historical novel A Northern Light (2003) on this murder. She explores events from the perspective of a young girl working at the Glenmore (a lodge on the lake). Robert Tucker also set his novel, Sasquatch Camp (2013), in this community.

== Gallery ==
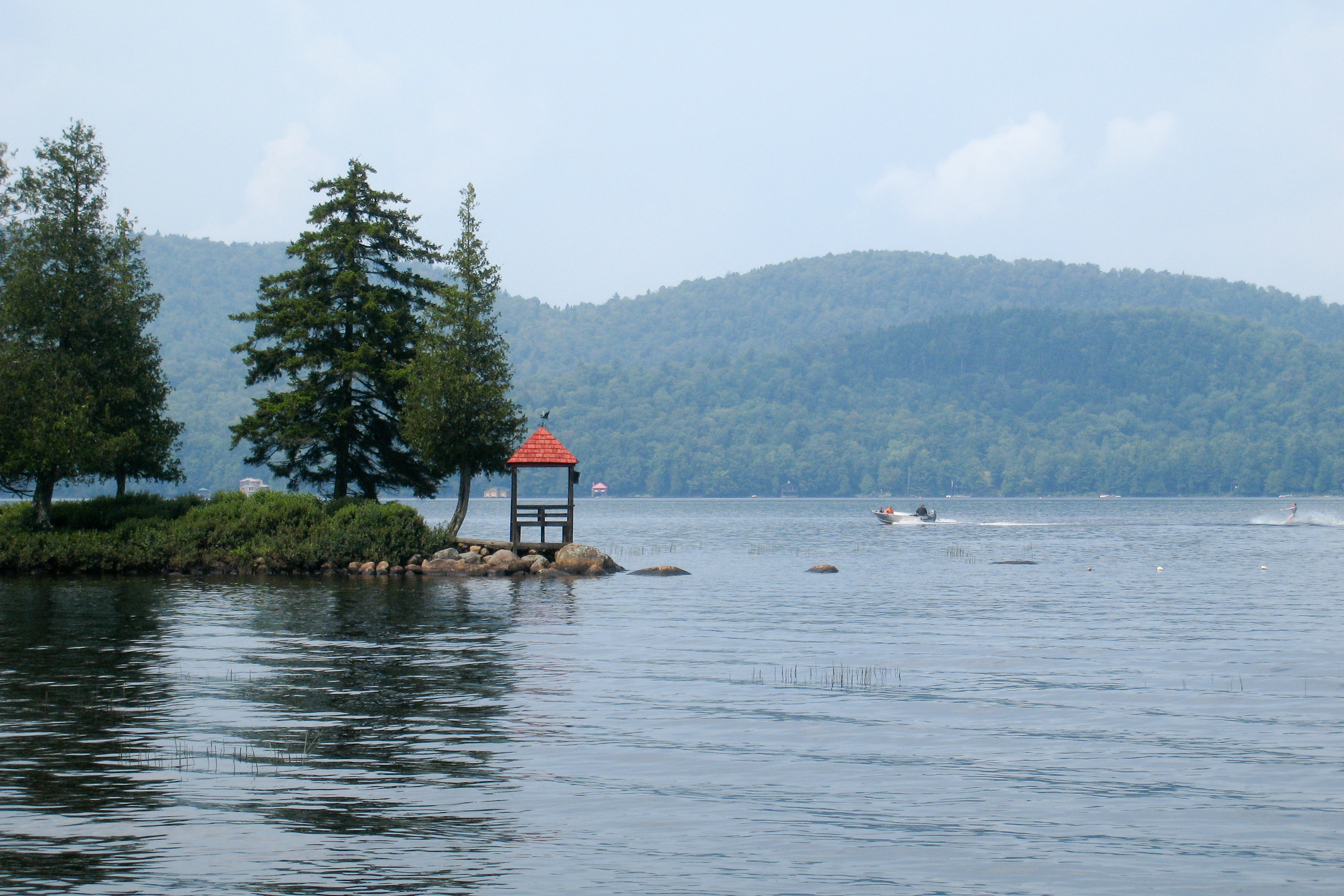
Big Moose Lake viewed from Covewood Lodge

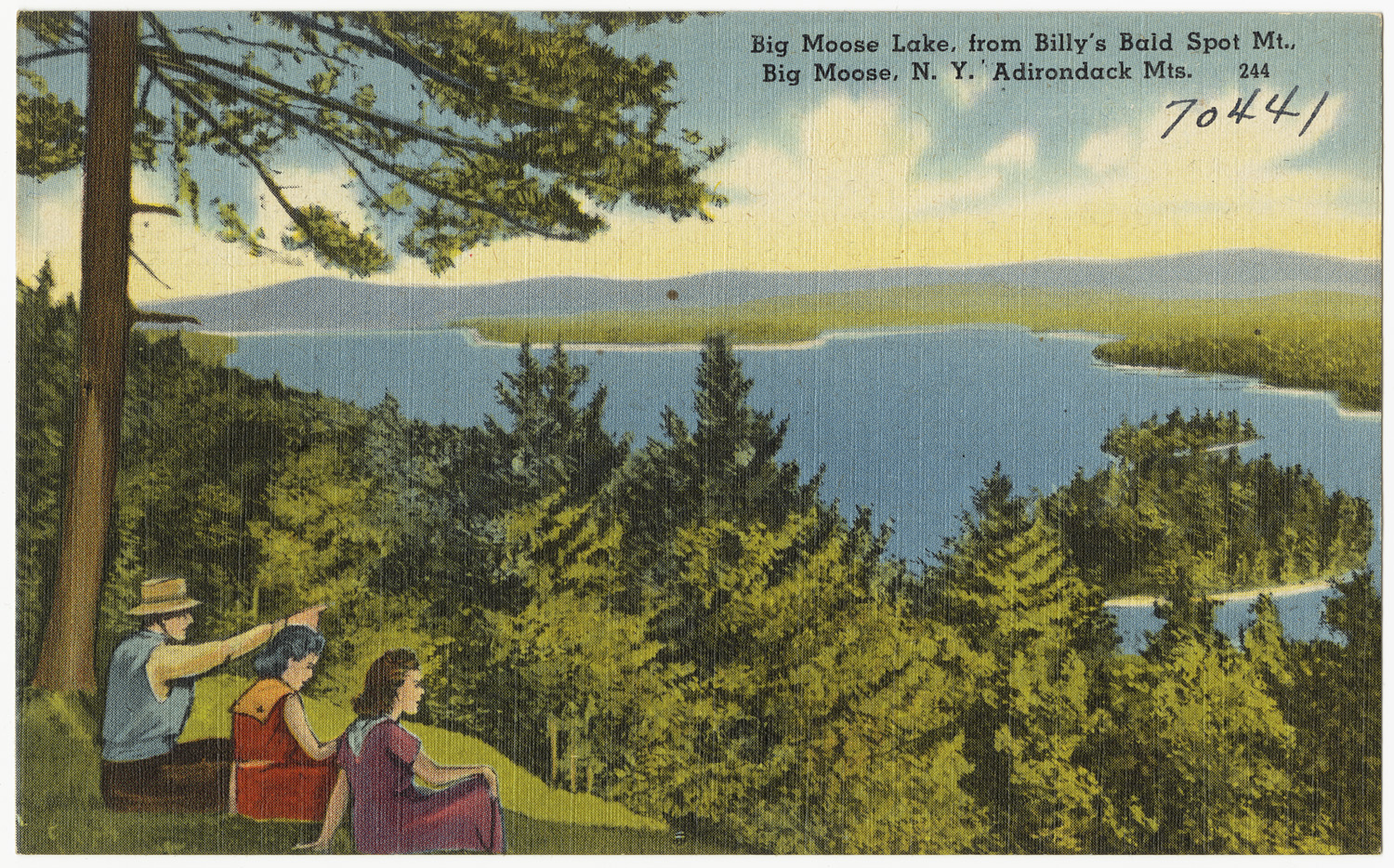
Postcard from 1930-1945 of Big Moose Lake

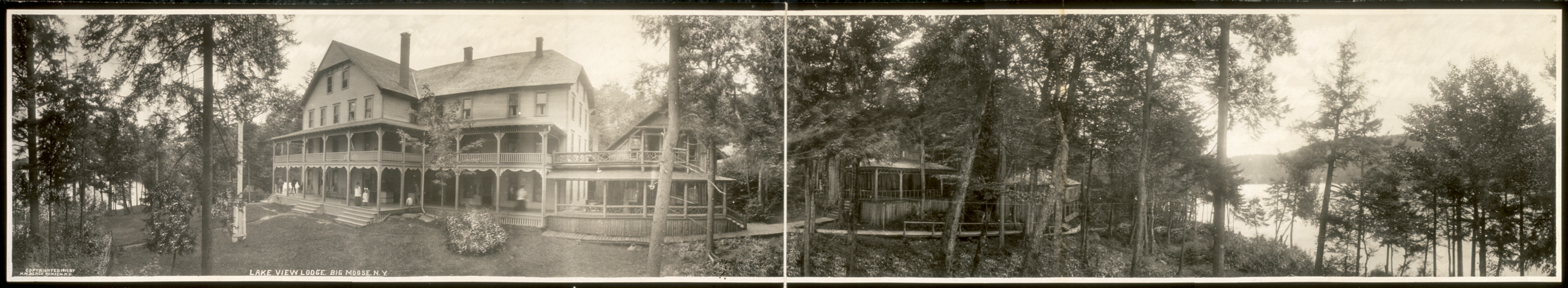
Lake View Lodge, the first luxury hotel, built 1898 (1911 photo)

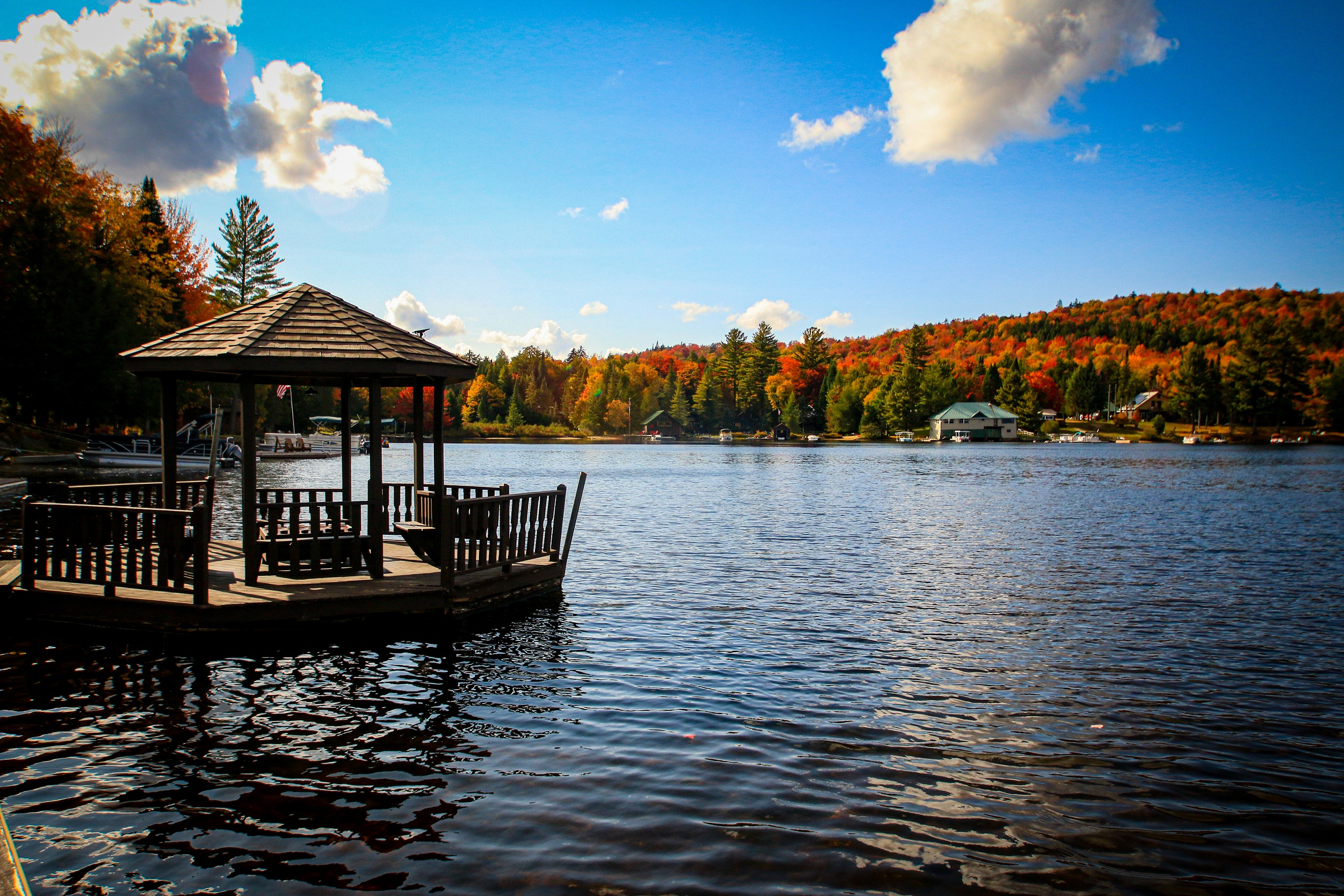
Fall foliage on Big Moose Lake
