= Chester Gillette =

American convicted murderer (1883–1908)

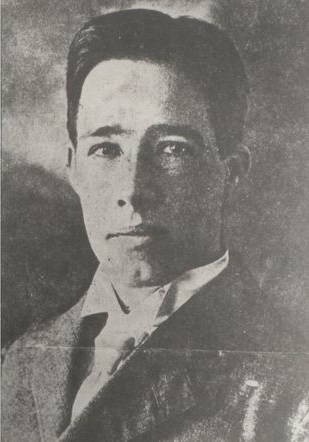
- Born: Chester Ellsworth Gillette; August 9, 1883; Wickes, Jefferson County, Montana Territory
- Died: March 30, 1908 (aged 24); Auburn Prison, New York, US
- Status: Executed by electric chair
- Motive: The victim revealed that she was pregnant and began pressuring Gillette to marry her
- Conviction: First degree murder
- Penalty: Death

Details
- Victims: Grace Brown, 20
- Date: July 11, 1906

Chester Ellsworth Gillette (August 9, 1883 – March 30, 1908) was an American convicted murderer who became the basis for the fictional character Clyde Griffiths in Theodore Dreiser's novel An American Tragedy. The novel, and thus Gillette's case indirectly, was adapted in turn for the 1931 film An American Tragedy and the 1951 film A Place in the Sun.

== Background ==
Gillette was born in Wickes, Jefferson County, Montana Territory to Franklin Gillette and Louisa Maria Rice, who married on October 21, 1883, two months after their son's birth. His parents were financially comfortable, but deeply religious, and eventually renounced material wealth to join The Salvation Army. The family traveled around the West Coast of the United States. Gillette thus spent part of his childhood in Spokane, Washington, and lived in Hawaii during his adolescence. Gillette never took to the religious aspects of his upbringing. He attended Oberlin College's preparatory school on the generosity of a wealthy uncle, but left after two years in 1903. After leaving school, he worked at odd jobs until 1905 when he took a position at another uncle's skirt factory in Cortland, New York.

== Murder of Grace Brown ==
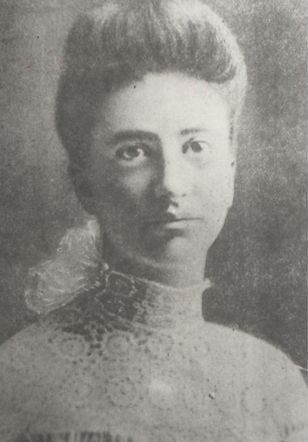
Grace Brown

At the factory, Gillette met Grace Brown, another employee. Gillette and Brown soon began a sexual relationship, with Brown assuming Gillette would marry her. In the spring of 1906, Brown revealed that she was pregnant. She continued to pressure Gillette to marry her, often writing him pleading letters. Brown then returned to her parents' home for a time, but returned to Cortland when she discovered that Gillette had been courting other girls. One popular story involved Miss Harriet Benedict, a wealthy acquaintance of Gillette who the newspapers later speculated was the "other woman" for whom Chester had left Grace. Harriet heatedly denied this, going so far as to issue a formal press release proclaiming: "I have never been engaged to Chester E. Gillette ... Our acquaintance was of ... a limited duration, and ... not a word or suggestion was ever made between us [about an engagement]."

As the spring and summer of 1906 progressed, others noticed an increasing frequency of Gillette's raised voice and Brown's tears at the factory or at each other's homes. Brown continued to press Gillette for some kind of decision, and Gillette played for time with vague statements about their future and of their going away on a trip sometime soon.

Finally, Gillette made arrangements for a trip to the Adirondack Mountains in upstate New York. The pair stayed for a night in Utica, New York, and then continued to Tupper Lake in Franklin County, spending the night. Rain the next day ruined their plans for an outing on a nearby lake, so they returned south to Big Moose Lake in Herkimer County. At the lakeside Glenmore Hotel, Gillette registered under a false name (although one that used his own initials to match the monogram on his suitcase). He was carrying one suitcase and a tennis racquet. Brown, at this point, may have expected some kind of elopement ceremony.

On July 11, Gillette took Brown in a rowboat on Big Moose Lake, where he clubbed her with his tennis racquet and left her to drown. An overturned boat was found floating in the lake, together with Gillette's hat, leading authorities initially to believe both had drowned. Meanwhile, Gillette, carrying a suitcase, hiked through the woods to Fulton Chain Lakes, where he checked into the Arrowhead Hotel under his real name. Later, witnesses said that Gillette seemed calm, collected, and perfectly at ease; nothing seemed to be amiss.

Brown's body was found at the bottom of the lake the next day. An autopsy revealed she had suffered major head trauma, turning an accidental drowning case into a murder investigation.

Gillette had done a poor job of planning the cover-up, and was quickly arrested in nearby Inlet, New York. Grace Brown was buried in Valley View Cemetery in her hometown, South Otselic, New York.

== Trial and execution ==
The trial took place in Herkimer County, and quickly drew nationwide attention. Gillette's uncle refused to pay for his defense. Court appointed attorneys claimed that their client was innocent, that Brown had committed suicide, and that Gillette was a helpless onlooker to the suicide. It did not help that Gillette had changed his story – claiming he was not there when Brown drowned, then accidental drowning, then suicide. He also had a hard time explaining to the jury Brown's injuries, why he took his suitcase on a boat ride, and how it ended up dry even though the boat overturned.

The jury convicted Gillette of murder. A New York State Appeals Court upheld the verdict, and Governor Charles Evans Hughes refused to grant clemency or give a reprieve.

On March 30, 1908, Chester Gillette was executed by electric chair at Auburn Prison in Auburn, New York. Gillette was buried in Soule Cemetery in Sennett, New York.

== In recent years ==
The television series Unsolved Mysteries aired an episode about the historical incident of Gillette and Brown in January 1996.

In 2007, Gillette's diary, which he wrote during his last seven months in prison, was donated to the Hamilton College Library by Gillette's grandniece. In addition to the diary, 12 letters written by Gillette during his time in prison were also donated.

Eleven of the letters were addressed to Bernice Ferrin, a friend of the family who moved to Auburn, New York, to stay with Gillette's sister, Hazel. The twelfth letter, a farewell letter written the day before his execution, was addressed to Hazel Gillette.

The diary and letters were published in December 2007, almost 100 years after the execution of Chester Gillette.

== Popular culture ==
Theodore Dreiser's 1925 An American Tragedy is based on the case. His novel inspired two films in turn: An American Tragedy and A Place In The Sun. Also based on the case is the Ballad of Big Moose Lake, a 1926 folk song of the Adirondack Mountains area that explicitly mentions Gillette in the first and last verses.
