= A Place in the Sun (1951 film) =

1951 film by George Stevens

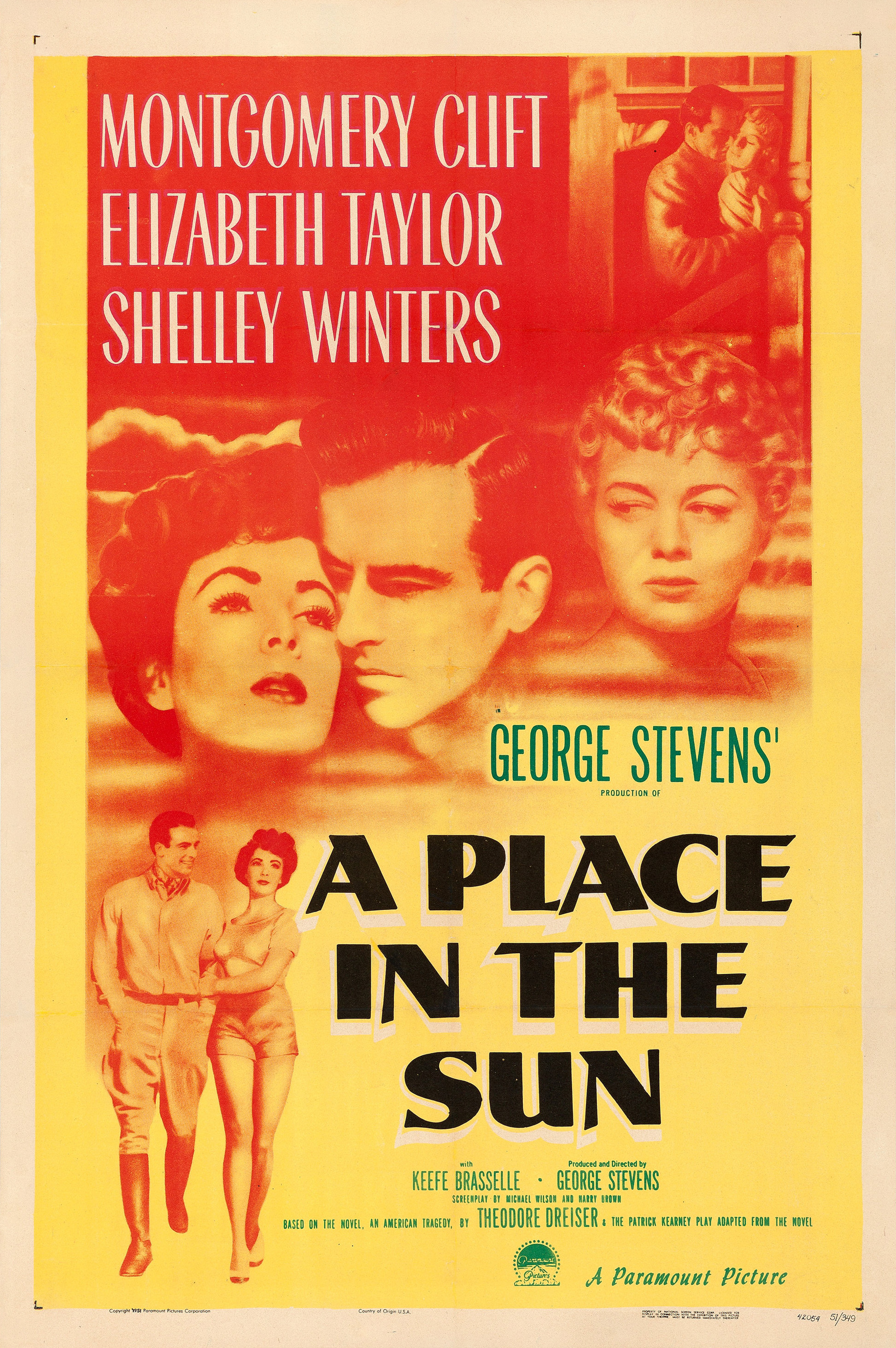
- Theatrical release poster
- Directed by: George Stevens
- Screenplay by: Michael Wilson; Harry Brown
- Based on: An American Tragedy (1925 novel) by Theodore Dreiser; An American Tragedy (1926 play) by Patrick Kearney
- Produced by: George Stevens
- Starring: Montgomery Clift; Elizabeth Taylor; Shelley Winters; Keefe Brasselle
- Cinematography: William C. Mellor
- Edited by: William Hornbeck
- Music by: Franz Waxman
- Production company: Paramount Pictures
- Distributed by: Paramount Pictures
- Release dates: April 5, 1951 (Cannes); August 14, 1951 (Los Angeles)
- Running time: 122 minutes
- Country: United States
- Language: English
- Budget: $2.3 million
- Box office: $7 million

A Place in the Sun is a 1951 American tragedy film directed and produced by George Stevens from a screenplay by Harry Brown and Michael Wilson, based on the 1925 novel An American Tragedy by Theodore Dreiser and its 1926 stage adaptation by Patrick Kearney. It stars Montgomery Clift, Elizabeth Taylor, Shelley Winters and Keefe Brasselle.

The story was inspired by the murder of Grace Brown by Chester Gillette in 1906, which resulted in Gillette's conviction and execution by electric chair in 1908. The novel had previously been adapted for the screen under its original title in 1931.

Released by Paramount Pictures on April 5, 1951, the film was a critical and commercial success, winning six Academy Awards (including Best Director and Best Screenplay) and the first-ever Golden Globe Award for Best Motion Picture – Drama.

In 1991, A Place in the Sun was selected for preservation in the United States National Film Registry by the Library of Congress as being "culturally, historically, or aesthetically significant".

== Plot ==
George Eastman, the poor nephew of rich industrialist Charles Eastman, is offered an entry-level job at his uncle's factory. Contrary to company rules, he begins secretly dating coworker Alice Tripp. Infatuated with George, Alice believes that George's famous surname will bring her advantages. Charles invites George to a social event, where George meets socialite Angela Vickers. They are attracted to each other and fall in love. Just as George enters the carefree lifestyle of his new life with Angela, Alice discloses that she is pregnant and expects George to marry her. Avoiding Alice, George continues to spend more time with Angela without Alice's knowledge. When invited to Angela's family lake house for Labor Day, George tells Alice that the visit to the influential circle will advance his career. Alice discovers George's lie after seeing a newspaper photograph of George and Angela boating with friends. Calling George at the Vickers home, Alice threatens to go there to reveal herself unless he leaves and returns to her. Shaken, George tells his hosts his mother is sick, and he must leave.

The next morning, George and Alice drive to City Hall to get married, but it is closed for the holiday. George is relieved; remembering that Alice cannot swim, he plans to drown her in the lake by faking an accident. Alice agrees to the lake outing. To cover his tracks for the planned murder, George stages a car breakdown in the woods and rents a rowboat under an alias. While they are on the lake, Alice discusses her dreams concerning their happy future together with their child. As George appears to take pity on her, Alice tries to stand in the boat, causing it to capsize. Both fall into the water; George saves himself, but Alice drowns.

George escapes, swims to shore, behaves suspiciously when he comes across campers on his way back to the car, and drives to the Vickers' lodge. He does not report the accident. Alice's body is discovered, and her death is treated as a homicide as the evidence against George begins to mount. Just as Angela's father approves of Angela's marriage to him, George is arrested and charged with murder. George's furtive actions before and after Alice's death condemn him. His denials are futile, and he is found guilty of murder and sentenced to death in the electric chair. As he is awaiting execution, George discusses his belief that he is not guilty of murder with a priest. The priest suggests that although George did not kill Alice, he did not act to save her because he was thinking of Angela; in his heart, it was murder. Angela visits George in prison, professing her love, and George slowly marches toward his execution.

== Cast ==
- Montgomery Clift as George Eastman
- Elizabeth Taylor as Angela Vickers
- Shelley Winters as Alice Tripp
- Anne Revere as Hannah Eastman
- Keefe Brasselle as Earl Eastman
- Fred Clark as Bellows
- Raymond Burr as R. Frank Marlowe
- Herbert Heyes as Charles Eastman
- Shepperd Strudwick as Anthony "Tony" Vickers
- Frieda Inescort as Ann Vickers
- Kathryn Givney as Louise Eastman
- Walter Sande as Art Jansen
- Ted de Corsia as Judge R.S. Oldendorff
- John Ridgely as Coroner
- Lois Chartrand as Marsha
- Paul Frees as Rev. Morrison

Uncredited

- Ian Wolfe as Dr. Wyeland
- Josephine Whittell as Margaret
- Ken Christy as Warden
- Kathleen Freeman as Factory Worker

== Production ==
On November 14, 1949, a letter from the Production Code Administration's Joseph I. Breen identified a worrisome issue with the dialogue between Alice and her doctor. Breen cautioned against direct references to abortion, specifically the line in the script in which Alice says, "Doctor, you've got to help me." In the finished film, the line became, "Somebody's got to help me", and while it is implied that Alice does not want the baby, the film avoids mentioning it.

In 1965, director George Stevens threatened to sue any television stations that inserted commercials into the film without his approval.

== Release ==
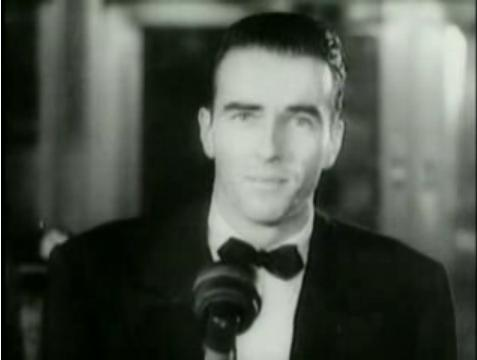
Montgomery Clift at the film's premiere

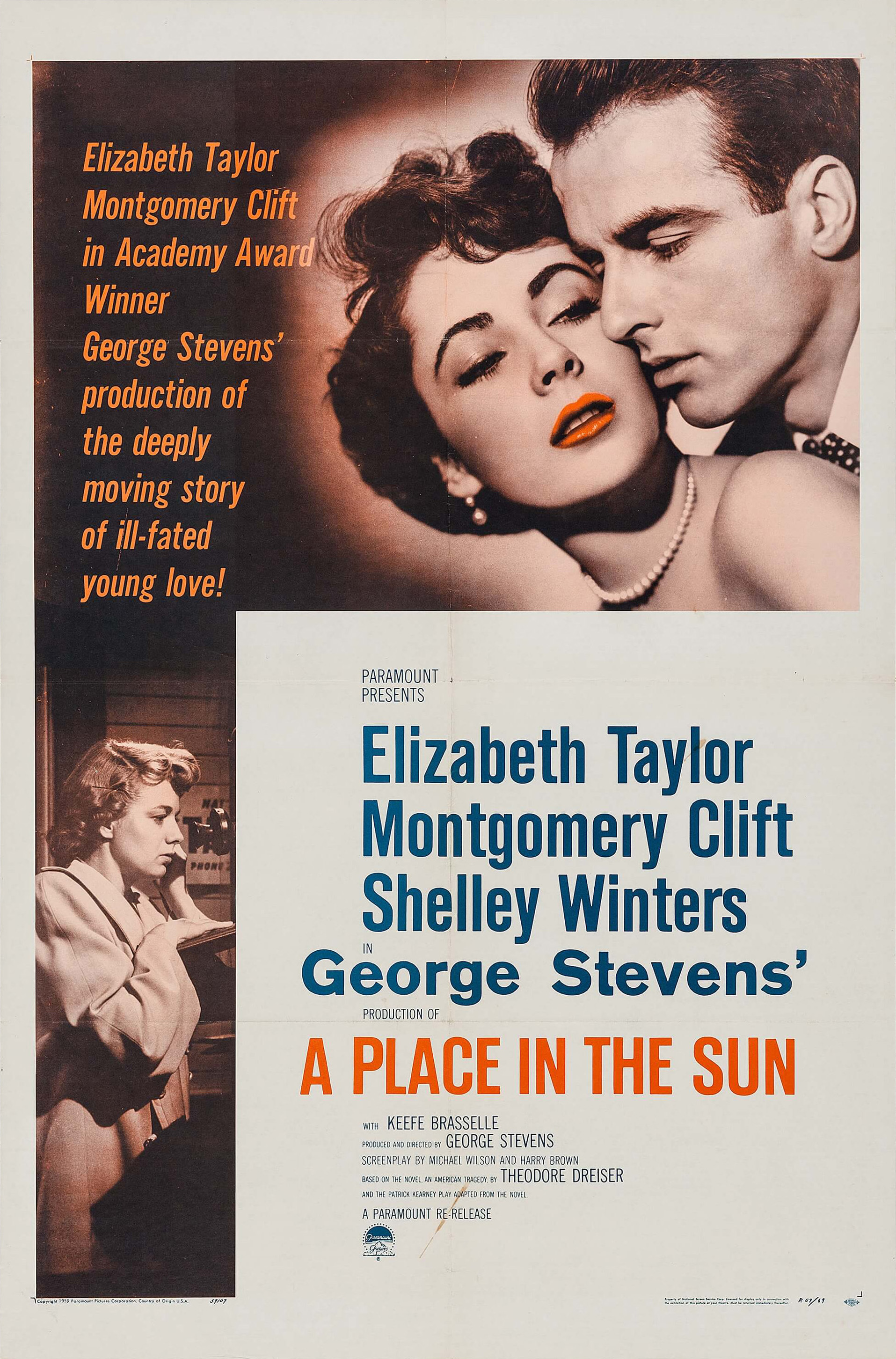
1959 re-release poster

The film was afforded a lavish premiere at the Fine Arts Theatre in Beverly Hills on August 14, 1951, that was attended by many Hollywood stars.

== Reception ==
=== Box office ===
The film earned an estimated $3.5 million at the U.S. and Canadian box offices.

=== Critical response ===
In a contemporary review for The New York Times, critic A. H. Weiler called the film "a work of beauty, tenderness, power and insight" and wrote:

"A Place in the Sun" emerges as a credit to both the motion-picture craft and, we feel reasonably certain, the author's major intentions. Out of Dreiser's often murky and turgid tale of the Twenties—now the present—the stream of words in "An American Tragedy," as has been noted many times previously, was not easy to navigate—scenarists Michael Wilson and Harry Brown have distilled the essence of tragedy and romance that is both moving and memorable. Retained, too, in this two-hour drama—representing the painstakingly edited end result of hundreds of thousands of feet of material shot—are characterizations which cleave to the Dreiser originals. And it is a tribute to deft dramatization that the young principals are projected as fully as the maelstrom of life in which they are trapped and with which they are unable to cope. ... Despite the fact that this version of Dreiser's tragedy may be criticized—academically, we think—for its length or deviations from the author's pattern, "A Place in the Sun'' is a distinguished work, a tribute, above all, to its producer-director and an effort now placed among the ranks of the finest films to have come from Hollywood in several years.

Critic Edwin Schallert of the Los Angeles Times wrote: "This is a remarkably fine screen rendition ... There have been many advance reports about the film's excellence. In no wise do they diminish the actual impact of the poignant story of an ambitious youth who becomes entangled in a strange, sinister web of romance, loses his chance in the world, and his opportunity to win happiness through the radiant love of a young girl of high social caste. The picture not only has its appeal, but its lesson to offer the public. The combination of the two will make it a memorable event for filmgoers."

Upon viewing the film, Charlie Chaplin called it "the greatest movie ever made about America", while film critic Pauline Kael called it a self-consciously paralyzed imitation of European art.

Raymond Burr's performance as a district attorney impressed TV producer Gail Patrick, who later cast him as Perry Mason.

=== Awards and nominations ===
Event	Category	Nominee(s)	Result
24th Academy Awards	Best Motion Picture	George Stevens	Nominated
24th Academy Awards	Best Director	George Stevens	Won
24th Academy Awards	Best Actor	Montgomery Clift	Nominated
24th Academy Awards	Best Actress	Shelley Winters	Nominated
24th Academy Awards	Best Screenplay	Michael Wilson and Harry Brown	Won
24th Academy Awards	Best Cinematography – Black-and-White	William C. Mellor	Won
24th Academy Awards	Best Costume Design – Black-and-White	Edith Head	Won
24th Academy Awards	Best Film Editing	William Hornbeck	Won
24th Academy Awards	Best Scoring of a Dramatic or Comedy Picture	Franz Waxman	Won
1951 Cannes Film Festival	Grand Prix	George Stevens	Nominated
4th Directors Guild of America Awards	Outstanding Directorial Achievement in Motion Pictures	George Stevens	Won
9th Golden Globe Awards	Best Motion Picture – Drama		Won
9th Golden Globe Awards	Best Actress in a Motion Picture – Drama	Shelley Winters	Nominated
9th Golden Globe Awards	Best Director – Motion Picture	George Stevens	Nominated
9th Golden Globe Awards	Best Cinematography – Black and White	William C. Mellor	Nominated
1952 Nastro d'Argento	Best Foreign Director	George Stevens	Won
National Board of Review Awards 1951	Best Film		Won
National Board of Review Awards 1951	Top Ten Films		Won
17th New York Film Critics Circle Awards	Best Director	George Stevens	Nominated
17th New York Film Critics Circle Awards	Best Actress	Shelley Winters	Nominated
8th Producers Guild of America Awards	Hall of Fame – Motion Pictures		Won
4th Writers Guild of America Awards	Best Written American Drama	Michael Wilson and Harry Brown	Won
4th Writers Guild of America Awards	Best Written Film Concerning American Scene	Michael Wilson and Harry Brown	Nominated

The February 2020 issue of New York Magazine named A Place in the Sun as among "The Best Movies That Lost Best Picture at the Oscars."

In 1991, A Place in the Sun was selected for preservation in the United States National Film Registry by the Library of Congress as being "culturally, historically, or aesthetically significant".

== Legacy ==
The white party dress with its bust covered with flower blossoms that was designed by Edith Head and worn by Elizabeth Taylor became the most popular prom dress style in the U.S. in 1951 and influenced prom and wedding-dress design for the rest of the decade.
