= Big Moose Community Chapel =

- U.S. National Register of Historic Places
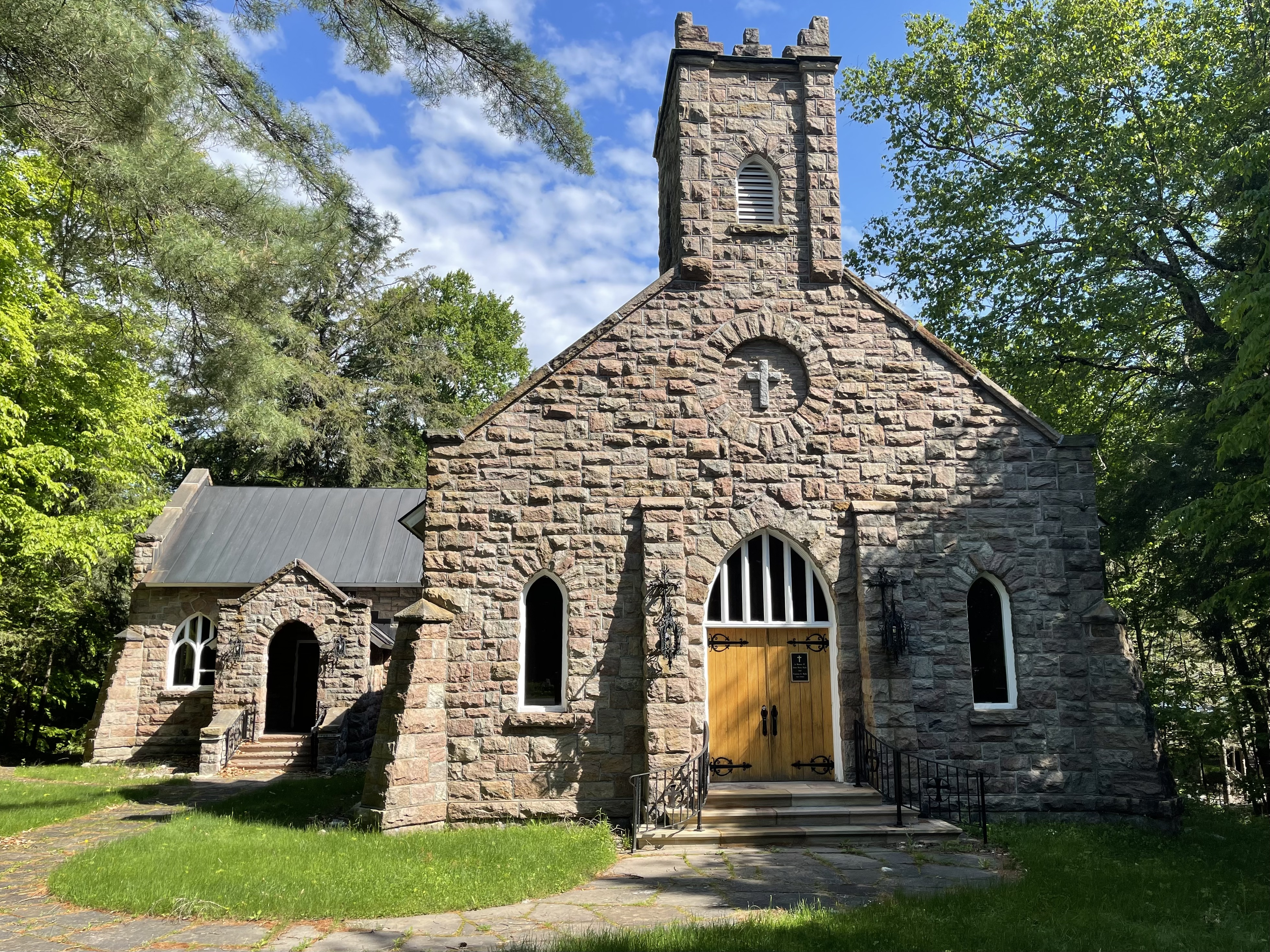

- Location within New York Location within the United States
- Nearest city: 1544 Big Moose Rd., near Eagle Bay, New York
- Coordinates: 43°49′03″N 74°52′43″W
- Area: 1.25 acres (0.51 ha)
- Built: 1928-1931
- Architect: Covey, Earl
- Architectural style: Late Gothic Revival, Adirondack
- NRHP reference No.: 12000478
- Added to NRHP: August 7, 2012

Big Moose Community Chapel is a historic chapel located on Big Moose Lake near Eagle Bay in Herkimer County, New York. The chapel was built in 1931, and is a modified "L"-plan Late Gothic Revival style church constructed of locally quarried granite. It has a cross-gable roof and features a small square belfry and pointed arch openings. It was built by master builder Earl Covey and incorporates Adirondack style architectural elements.

The chapel was listed on the National Register of Historic Places in 2012.
