= Covewood Lodge =

- U.S. National Register of Historic Places
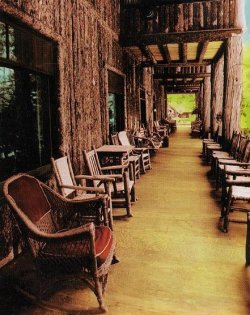
- Vertical half-log construction of Covewood Lodge, 1999

- Location within New York Location within the United States
- Location: 120 Covewood Lodge Rd., Big Moose, New York
- Coordinates: 43°49′0″N 74°51′8″W
- Area: 50 acres (20 ha)
- Built: 1922
- Architect: Covey, Earl
- Architectural style: Rustic
- NRHP reference No.: 04000435
- Added to NRHP: May 12, 2004

Covewood Lodge is a historic summer camp complex located at Big Moose Lake in Herkimer County, New York. It was built during the 1920s and consists of the main lodge surrounded by 18 historic cottages. The main lodge is a T-shaped rustic camp building built in 1924–25. It is a two-story log structure sheathed with vertically and diagonally laid planks. It features a two-story verandah supported by massive tree trunks.

It was listed on the National Register of Historic Places in 2004.
