= South Otselic, New York =

- Hamlet
- Location within New York Location within the United States
- Coordinates: 42°38′48″N 75°46′53″W
- Country: United States
- State: New York
- County: Chenango
- Town: Otselic
- Elevation: 1,227 ft (374 m)
- Time zone: UTC-5 (Eastern (EST))
  - Summer (DST): UTC-4 (EDT)
- ZIP code: 13155
- Area codes: 315 & 680
- GNIS feature ID: 965833

South Otselic is a hamlet in the town of Otselic, Chenango County, New York, United States.

== Location ==
The community is located along New York State Route 26, 14.6 miles (23.5 km) west of Sherburne. South Otselic has a post office with ZIP code 13155, which opened on April 17, 1830.
