= Indies Choice Book Awards =

American literary award

The Indies Choice Book Award (formerly known as Book Sense Book of the Year 2000-2008) is an American literary award that was inaugurated at BookExpo America 2000. The American Booksellers Association (ABA) rededicated the award (previously known as the ABBY) in recognition of a new era in bookselling, as well as the important role the Book Sense Picks List has played for independent booksellers in discovering and spreading the word about books of quality to all stores, and readers, nationwide. Throughout the year, Book Sense independent booksellers from across the country nominate for inclusion in the monthly Book Sense Picks the books that they most enjoyed hand-selling to their customers. The books on each list represent a combined national and local staff pick selection of booksellers' favorites from more than 1,200 independent bookstores with Book Sense.

The award was renamed the Indies Choice Book Award in 2009. The winners are announced in conjunction with the E. B. White Read Aloud Award

== Award winners and honor books ==
Award Recipients
Year	Category	Title	Author	Result
2004	Adult Fiction	The Da Vinci Code	Dan Brown	Winner
2004	Adult Fiction	The Curious Incident of the Dog in the Night-Time	Mark Haddon	Honor
2004	Adult Fiction	The Master Butchers Singing Club	Louise Erdrich	Honor
2004	Adult Fiction	Mrs. Kimble	Jennifer Haigh	Honor
2004	Adult Fiction	The Time Traveler's Wife	Audrey Niffenegger	Honor
2004	Adult Nonfiction	Reading Lolita in Tehran: A Memoir in Books	Azar Nafisi	Winner
2004	Adult Nonfiction	The Devil in the White City: Murder, Magic, and Madness at the Fair That Changed America	Erik Larson	Honor
2004	Adult Nonfiction	Flyboys: A True Story of Courage	James Bradley	Honor
2004	Adult Nonfiction	Michelangelo & The Pope's Ceiling	Ross King	Honor
2004	Adult Nonfiction	Mountains Beyond Mountains	Tracy Kidder	Honor
2004	Children's Literature	Eragon	Christopher Paolini	Winner
2004	Children's Literature	Artemis Fowl and the Eternity Code	Eoin Colfer	Honor
2004	Children's Literature	Inkheart	Cornelia Funke	Honor
2004	Children's Literature	The Second Summer of the Sisterhood	Ann Brashares	Honor
2004	Children's Literature	The Tale of Despereaux	Kate DiCamillo and Timothy Basil Ering (illus.)	Honor
2004	Children's Illustrated	How I Became a Pirate	Melinda Long and David Shannon (illus.)	Winner
2004	Children's Illustrated	Diary of a Wombat	Jackie French and Bruce Whatley (illus.)	Honor
2004	Children's Illustrated	Diary of a Worm	Doreen Cronin and Harry Bliss (illus.)	Honor
2004	Children's Illustrated	Old Turtle and the Broken Truth	Douglas Wood and Jon J. Muth (illus.)	Honor
2004	Children's Illustrated	Olivia ... and the Missing Toy	Ian Falconer	Honor
2004	Paperback	The Secret Life of Bees	Sue Monk Kidd	Winner
2004	Paperback	Atonement	Ian McEwan	Honor
2004	Paperback	The Dive from Clausen's Pier	Ann Packer	Honor
2004	Paperback	Lamb: The Gospel According to Biff, Christ's Childhood Pal	Christopher Moore	Honor
2004	Paperback	Life of Pi	Yann Martel	Honor
2005	Adult Fiction	Jonathan Strange & Mr Norrell	Susanna Clarke	Winner
2005	Adult Fiction	Eventide	Kent Haruf	Honor
2005	Adult Fiction	The Birth of Venus	Sarah Dunant	Honor
2005	Adult Fiction	The Plot Against America	Philip Roth	Honor
2005	Adult Fiction	The Shadow of the Wind	Carlos Ruiz Zafon	Honor
2005	Adult Nonfiction	Shadow Divers: The True Adventure of Two Americans Who Risked Everything to Solve One of the Last Mysteries of World War II	Robert Kurson	Winner
2005	Adult Nonfiction	Candyfreak	Steve Almond	Honor
2005	Adult Nonfiction	The Complete Cartoons of the New Yorker	Robert Mankoff (ed.)	Honor
2005	Adult Nonfiction	Magical Thinking	Augusten Burroughs	Honor
2005	Adult Nonfiction	Truth & Beauty: A Friendship	Ann Patchett	Honor
2005	Children's Literature	Chasing Vermeer	Blue Balliett and Brett Helquist (Illus.)	Winner
2005	Children's Literature	Becoming Naomi Leon	Pam Muñoz Ryan	Honor
2005	Children's Literature	Ida B ... and Her Plans to Maximize Fun, Avoid Disaster, and (Possibly) Save the World	Katherine Hannigan	Honor
2005	Children's Literature	Peter and the Starcatchers	Dave Barry and Ridley Pearson	Honor
2005	Children's Literature	The Sea of Trolls	Nancy Farmer	Honor
2005	Children's Illustrated	Duck for President	Doreen Cronin and Betsy Lewin (Illus.)	Winner
2005	Children's Illustrated	Kitten's First Full Moon	Kevin Henkes	Honor
2005	Children's Illustrated	Knuffle Bunny	Mo Willems	Honor
2005	Children's Illustrated	Mister Seahorse	Eric Carle	Honor
2005	Children's Illustrated	Wild About Books	Judy Sierra	Honor
2006	Adult Fiction	The Historian: A Novel	Elizabeth Kostova	Winner
2006	Adult Fiction	Kafka on the Shore	Haruki Murakami	Honor
2006	Adult Fiction	The March: A Novel	E. L. Doctorow	Honor
2006	Adult Fiction	Saturday	Ian McEwan	Honor
2006	Adult Fiction	Snow Flower and the Secret Fan	Lisa See	Honor
2006	Adult Nonfiction	Freakonomics: A Rogue Economist Explores the Hidden Side of Everything	Steven D. Levitt and Stephen J. Dubner	Winner
2006	Adult Nonfiction	The Glass Castle	Jeannette Walls	Honor
2006	Adult Nonfiction	The Lost Painting: The Quest for a Caravaggio Masterpiece	Jonathan Harr	Honor
2006	Adult Nonfiction	Marley & Me: Life and Love with the World's Worst Dog	John Grogan	Honor
2006	Adult Nonfiction	The Tender Bar: A Memoir	J.R. Moehringer	Honor
2006	Children's Literature	Inkspell	Cornelia Funke	Winner
2006	Children's Literature	A Dog's Life: The Autobiography of a Stray	Ann M. Martin	Honor
2006	Children's Literature	Eldest	Christopher Paolini	Honor
2006	Children's Literature	Flush	Carl Hiaasen	Honor
2006	Children's Literature	The Penderwicks: A Summer Tale of Four Sisters, Two Rabbits, and a Very Interesting Boy	Jeanne Birdsall	Honor
2006	Children's Illustrated	Zen Shorts	Jon J Muth	Winner
2006	Children's Illustrated	Diary of a Spider	Doreen Cronin and Harry Bliss (Illus.)	Honor
2006	Children's Illustrated	Leaf Man	Lois Ehlert	Honor
2006	Children's Illustrated	Leonardo, the Terrible Monster	Mo Willems	Honor
2006	Children's Illustrated	Seen Art?	Jon Scieszka and Lane Smith (Illus.)	Honor
2007	Adult Fiction	Water for Elephants	Sara Gruen	Winner
2007	Adult Fiction	The Brief History of the Dead	Kevin Brockmeier	Honor
2007	Adult Fiction	The Inheritance of Loss	Kiran Desai	Honor
2007	Adult Fiction	The Road	Cormac McCarthy	Honor
2007	Adult Fiction	Suite française	Irène Némirovsky	Honor
2007	Adult Nonfiction	I Feel Bad About My Neck: And Other Thoughts on Being a Woman	Nora Ephron	Winner
2007	Adult Nonfiction	The Life and Times of the Thunderbolt Kid	Bill Bryson	Honor
2007	Adult Nonfiction	Mayflower: A Story of Courage, Community, and War	Nathaniel Philbrick	Honor
2007	Adult Nonfiction	Thunderstruck	Erik Larson	Honor
2007	Adult Nonfiction	The Worst Hard Time: The Untold Story of Those Who Survived the Great American Dust Bowl	Timothy Egan	Honor
2007	Children's Literature	The Book Thief	Markus Zusak	Winner
2007	Children's Literature	The Astonishing Life of Octavian Nothing: Traitor to the Nation, Volume One: The Pox Party	M. T. Anderson	Honor
2007	Children's Literature	Eats, Shoots & Leaves: Why, Commas Really Do Make a Difference!	Lynne Truss	Honor
2007	Children's Literature	New Moon	Stephenie Meyer	Honor
2007	Children's Literature	Peter and the Shadow Thieves	Dave Barry and Ridley Pearson	Honor
2007	Children's Illustrated	Owen & Mzee: The True Story of a Remarkable Friendship	Paul Kahumbu, Isabella Hatkoff and Dr. Paul Kahumbu	Winner
2007	Children's Illustrated	Fancy Nancy	Jane O'Connor and Robin Preiss Glasser (illus.)	Honor
2007	Children's Illustrated	Flotsam	David Wiesner	Honor
2007	Children's Illustrated	Library Lion	Michelle Knudsen and Kevin Hawkes (illus.)	Honor
2007	Children's Illustrated	Pirateology: A Pirate Hunter's Companion	Captain William Lubber and Nghiem Ta (designer)	Honor
2008	Adult Fiction	A Thousand Splendid Suns	Khaled Hosseini	Winner
2008	Adult Fiction	The Yiddish Policemen's Union	Michael Chabon	Honor
2008	Adult Fiction	Bridge of Sighs	Richard Russo	Honor
2008	Adult Fiction	Away	Amy Bloom	Honor
2008	Adult Fiction	Run	Ann Patchett	Honor
2008	Adult Nonfiction	Animal, Vegetable, Miracle: A Year of Food Life	Barbara Kingsolver, with Steven L. Hopp and Camille Kingsolver	Winner
2008	Adult Nonfiction	The World Without Us	Alan Weisman	Honor
2008	Adult Nonfiction	Born Standing Up: A Comic's Life	Steve Martin	Honor
2008	Adult Nonfiction	The Coldest Winter: America and the Korean War	David Halberstam	Honor
2008	Adult Nonfiction	The Year of Living Biblically: One Man's Humble Quest to Follow the Bible as Literally as Possible	A. J. Jacobs	Honor
2008	Children's Literature	The Invention of Hugo Cabret	Brian Selznick	Winner
2008	Children's Literature	The Absolutely True Diary of a Part-Time Indian	Sherman Alexie	Honor
2008	Children's Literature	Eclipse	Stephenie Meyer	Honor
2008	Children's Literature	Diary of a Wimpy Kid	Jeff Kinney	Honor
2008	Children's Literature	The Arrival	Shaun Tan	Honor
2008	Children's Illustrated	Knuffle Bunny Too: A Case of Mistaken Identity	Mo Willems	Winner
2008	Children's Illustrated	Fancy Nancy and the Posh Puppy	Jane O'Connor and Robin Preiss Glasser (Illus.)	Honor
2008	Children's Illustrated	Pirates Don't Change Diapers	Melinda Long and David Shannon (Illus.)	Honor
2008	Children's Illustrated	The Wall: Growing Up Behind the Iron Curtain	Peter Sis	Honor
2008	Children's Illustrated	Llama Llama Mad at Mama	Anna Dewdney	Honor
2009	Best Indie Buzz Book (Fiction)	The Guernsey Literary and Potato Peel Pie Society	Mary Ann Shaffer and Annie Barrows	Winner
2009	Best Conversation Starter (Nonfiction)	The Wordy Shipmates	Sarah Vowell	Winner
2009	Best Author Discovery	The Story of Edgar Sawtelle	David Wroblewski	Winner
2009	Best Indie Young Adult Buzz Book (Fiction)	The Graveyard Book	Neil Gaiman	Winner
2009	Best New Picture Book	Bats at the Library	Brian Lies	Winner
2009	Most Engaging Author	Sherman Alexie		Winner
2010	Adult Fiction	Cutting for Stone	Abraham Verghese	Winner
2010	Adult Nonfiction	The Lost City of Z	David Grann	Winner
2010	Adult Debut	The Help	Kathryn Stockett	Winner
2010	Young Adult	Catching Fire	Suzanne Collins	Winner
2010	Middle Reader	When You Reach Me	Rebecca Stead	Winner
2010	New Picture Book	The Lion & the Mouse	Jerry Pinkney	Winner
2010	Most Engaging Author	Kate DiCamillo		Winner
2011	Adult Fiction	Room	Emma Donoghue	Winner
2011	Adult Nonfiction	Unbroken	Laura Hillenbrand	Winner
2011	Adult Debut	Matterhorn	Karl Marlantes	Winner
2011	Young Adult	Revolution	Jennifer Donnelly	Winner
2012	Adult Fiction	The Marriage Plot	Jeffrey Eugenides	Winner
2012	Adult Nonfiction	Blood, Bones & Butter: The Inadvertent Education of a Reluctant Chef	Gabrielle Hamilton	Winner
2012	Adult Debut	The Tiger’s Wife	Téa Obreht	Winner
2012	Young Adult	Between Shades of Gray	Ruta Sepetys	Winner
2012	Most Engaging Author	Ann Patchett		Winner
2012	Middle Reader	The Apothecary	Maile Meloy and Ian Schoenherr (Illus.)	Winner
2012	Middle Reader	Wildwood	Colin Meloy and Carson Ellis (Illus.)	Winner
2012	Picture Book	I Want My Hat Back	Jon Klassen	Winner
2013	Adult Fiction	The Round House	Louise Erdrich	Winner
2013	Adult Nonfiction	Wild	Cheryl Strayed	Winner
2014	Adult Fiction	Life After Life	Kate Atkinson	Winner
2014	Adult Nonfiction	The Boys in the Boat	Daniel James Brown	Winner
2014	Adult Debut	A Constellation of Vital Phenomena	Anthony Marra	Winner
2014	Young Adult	Eleanor & Park	Rainbow Rowell	Winner
2014	Indie Champion	James Patterson		Winner
2015	Adult Fiction	All the Light We Cannot See	Anthony Doerr	Winner
2015	Adult Nonfiction	Being Mortal: Medicine and What Matters in the End	Atul Gawande	Winner
2015	Adult Debut	The Martian	Andy Weir	Winner
2015	Young Adult	The Darkest Part of the Forest	Holly Black	Winner
2015	Indie Champion	Neil Gaiman		Winner
2015	Indie Champion	Amanda Palmer		Winner
2016	Adult Fiction	Fates and Furies	Lauren Groff	Winner
2016	Adult Fiction	City on Fire	Garth Risk Hallberg	Honor
2016	Adult Fiction	Get in Trouble	Kelly Link	Honor
2016	Adult Fiction	A Little Life	Hanya Yanagihara	Honor
2016	Adult Fiction	The Sympathizer	Viet Thanh Nguyen	Honor
2016	Adult Fiction	Welcome to Braggsville	T. Geronimo Johnson	Honor
2016	Adult Nonfiction	Between the World and Me	Ta-Nehisi Coates	Winner
2016	Adult Nonfiction	Dead Wake: The Last Crossing of the Lusitania	Erik Larson	Honor
2016	Adult Nonfiction	Don't Suck, Don't Die: Giving Up Vic Chesnutt	Kristin Hersh	Honor
2016	Adult Nonfiction	H Is for Hawk	Helen Macdonald	Honor
2016	Adult Nonfiction	Hold Still: A Memoir With Photographs	Sally Mann	Honor
2016	Adult Nonfiction	Where the Dead Pause, and the Japanese Say Goodbye: A Journey	Marie Mutsuki Mockett	Honor
2016	Adult Debut	Kitchens of the Great Midwest: A Novel	J. Ryan Stradal	Winner
2016	Adult Debut	Between You & Me: Confessions of a Comma Queen	Mary Norris	Honor
2016	Adult Debut	Dragonfish	Vu Tran	Honor
2016	Adult Debut	The Meursault Investigation	Kamel Daoud	Honor
2016	Adult Debut	Our Endless Numbered Days	Claire Fuller	Honor
2016	Adult Debut	The Turner House	Angela Flournoy	Honor
2016	Young Adult	Anna and the Swallow Man	Gavriel Savit	Winner
2016	Young Adult	Nimona	ND Stevenson	Winner
2016	Young Adult	Dumplin’	Julie Murphy	Honor
2016	Young Adult	More Happy Than Not	Adam Silvera	Honor
2016	Young Adult	Simon vs. the Homo Sapiens Agenda	Becky Albertalli	Honor
2016	Young Adult	Symphony for the City of the Dead: Dmitri Shostakovich and the Siege of Leningrad	M. T. Anderson	Honor
2016	Indie Champion	Richard Russo		Winner
2016	Indie Champion	Dave Eggers		Honor
2016	Indie Champion	Louise Erdrich		Honor
2016	Indie Champion	Loren Long		Honor
2016	Indie Champion	Celeste Ng		Honor
2016	Indie Champion	Maggie Stiefvater		Honor

== Picture Book Hall of Fame ==
Picture Book Hall of Fame
Year Inducted	Title	Author	Illustrator
2012	Curious George	H.A. Rey	
2012	The Little Engine That Could	Watty Piper	
2012	Miss Rumphius	Barbara Cooney	
2013	Caps for Sale	Esphyr Slobokina	
2013	Harold and the Purple Crayon	Crockett Johnson	
2013	The True Story of the Three Little Pigs	Jon Scieszka	Lane Smith
2014	Brown Bear, Brown Bear What Do You See?	Bill Martin Jr.	Eric Carle
2014	Goodnight Moon	Margaret Wise Brown	Clement Hurd
2014	Stellaluna	Janell Cannon	
2015	Frog and Toad	Arnold Lobel	
2015	Blueberries for Sal	Robert McCloskey	
2015	If You Give a Mouse a Cookie	Laura Numeroff	Felicia Bond
2016	Eloise	Kay Thompson	Hilary Knight
2016	Olivia	Ian Falconer	
2016	Strega Nona	Tomi dePaola	
2016	Sylvester and the Magic Pebble	William Stieg	

== See also ==
- Book Sense
- American Booksellers Association
- Independent bookstore
