= Click, Clack, Quackity-Quack =

2005 children's picturebook

Click, Clack, Quackity-Quack: An Alphabetical Adventure
- First edition cover
- Author: Doreen Cronin
- Original title: None
- Translator: None
- Illustrator: Betsy Lewin
- Cover artist: Lewin
- Language: English
- Series: Click, Clack
- Subject: Alphabet
- Genre: Children's literature
- Publisher: Atheneum Books for Young Readers
- Publication date: September 27, 2005
- Publication place: United States
- Media type: Print (Hardcover)
- Pages: 24
- ISBN: 978-0-689-87715-5
- Preceded by: Click, Clack, Moo
- Followed by: Click, Clack, Splish, Splash: A Counting Adventure

Click, Clack, Quackity-Quack: An Alphabetical Adventure is a children's picture book by Doreen Cronin. Published in 2005 by Atheneum Books, it is a sequel to Click, Clack, Moo: Cows That Type and was illustrated by Betsy Lewin. A sequel, Click, Clack, Splish, Splash: A Counting Adventure, followed in 2006.

== Plot ==
The book has phrases that start with each letter of the alphabet. It tells the story of a Duck-led summer outing that includes the cows from Click, Clack, Moo: Cows That Type. When Duck rides his wagon, the readers go through the ABCs. The animals stop at a good place to have a picnic.

== Reception ==
A Publishers Weekly review says, "Lewin's loose, thickly outlined watercolors keep readers in playful suspense along the way, dropping visual hints for eagle-eye observers. Her sunny depictions of this barnyard bunch brim with personality and humorous detail". A Kirkus Reviews review says, " Lewin's brush and watercolor illustrations are as loose and lively as ever, barely restrained by the A-to-Z format that juxtaposes a big lowercase letter with each visual vignette". A School Library Journal review says, "A delightfully daffy romp with kid appeal galore".
