= Llama Llama Mad at Mama =

Children's book

- Author: Anna Dewdney
- Illustrator: Anna Dewdney
- Language: English
- Series: Llama Llama
- Genre: Children's book (Illustrated)
- Publisher: Viking
- Publication date: January 2007
- Publication place: United States
- Media type: Hardcover Book
- Pages: 32
- ISBN: 978-0-670-06240-9

Llama Llama Mad at Mama is a children's picture book written and illustrated by American author Anna Dewdney. It was published in 2007 by Viking Press, a division of Penguin Random House. The book follows a young llama and his mother on their day out shopping, resulting in a tantrum from the young llama. The book is second in the Llama Llama series, which also includes Llama Llama Red Pajama. Netflix produced a show called Llama Llama based on the books in 2018, including an episode based on Llama Llama Mad at Mama titled "Llama Llama Shopping Drama".

Dewdney quoted in an interview that "children are far more like animals than they are like adults" and took inspiration from such in writing the series. The book has been praised for its ability to help young children handle strong emotions. Guides with advice for walking children through feelings along with reading the story and activities to follow have been published in recent years. Some publications provide shopping etiquette and nutrition guides as an accompaniment to the book.

Llama Llama Mad at Mama won the Missouri Building Block Award in 2008. It received the Book Sense Book of the Year Award in 2008.

== Plot ==
Llama Llama is starting his day playing with his toys, when Mama Llama starts to get the car ready to go shopping. Llama Llama sleeps during the drive until he and his mother arrive at the store. He quickly becomes upset by the crowd of other animals in the store. Mama Llama then has Llama Llama try on clothes, which he does not care for. He plays with his stuffed toy instead of looking at the new socks and sweaters. His mother asks him about lunch, but he instead decides he wants to leave and get his treat. Llama Llama becomes angry at his mother and throws a tantrum, violently flinging items out of the shopping cart. He makes a huge mess in the aisle. Mama Llama then talks to him about how shopping is something they can do together as a team. Llama Llama helps his mother clean up and finish her shopping. They look for their car and Llama Llama smiles as his mother puts on his new shoes. After the pair leave the store, they eat ice cream and Llama Llama declares that he "loves his mama".

== Themes ==
=== Handling emotions ===
The Michigan State University Extension guide suggests questions for parents to ask their children, such as "What do you do when you're mad?" and "How did Llama feel at the store?". A reading guide from Nemours Children's Reading BrightStart! proposes acting out emotions with children and spending time observing the details of each character's face and movements in every illustration. Reading is Fundamental recommends a "Friendship Activity Guide" to follow the book. The lesson on learning how to control emotions in Llama Llama Mad at Mama presents an opportunity for children to build both their emotional awareness and their social skills.

Critics seem to appreciate Dewdney's portrayal of difficult emotions. Kirkus Reviews praises the story for the number of emotions which it presents, including "dismay, rage, chagrin, and delight". Perri Klass, writing in The New York Times, comments that there is "no deep or profound lesson to be learned about obedience... it's about cutting the drama and getting the shopping done", appreciating the idea in the book that sometimes emotions need to be set aside. Common Sense Media's Patricia Tauzer notes that "the young llama has a tantrum... but peace is made in the end".

=== Parent-child relationships ===
By the end of the book, Llama Llama learns to enjoy his time shopping because he gets to share it with his mother. In a 2013 Wall Street Journal essay, Dewdney wrote that "as parents... it is up to us to teach children how to function on the planet". She incorporates this idea into her story, as Mama Llama helps Llama Llama work through his overwhelming frustration.

Multiple accompanying guides to the book suggest activities that encourage a strong parent-child relationship. Nemours Children's Reading BrightStart! asks the interested parent if they have "ever gone shopping with your child on a day where he just doesn't want to go", suggesting that the story may assist them with this difficulty. South Dakota State University Extension contributes suggestions for making grocery shopping an opportunity to connect with young children, such as "playing iSpy" or "giving your child a job".

Critics value the message about a healthy parent-child relationship. Perri Klass, in The New York Times writes positively for the perspective in the story of "going easy on each other". Publishers Weekly praises the story for the "easily identifiable experience" that will leave "kids and parents hoping Llama has many more adventures ahead", emphasizing the bonding which an adult and a child can discover through the tale.

== Reception ==
Kirkus Reviews called it "a perfect choice for preschool read-alouds".
