= Giggle, Giggle, Quack =

Children's book by Doreen Cronin

- Author: Doreen Cronin
- Illustrator: Betsy Lewin
- Language: English
- Genre: picture book, children's literature
- Publication place: United States
- Pages: 32
- Preceded by: Click, Clack, Moo: Cows That Type
- Followed by: Duck for President

Giggle, Giggle, Quack is a children's book by Doreen Cronin, illustrated by Betsy Lewin and a sequel/spin-off to Click, Clack, Moo: Cows That Type. Published by Simon and Schuster, it tells the story of Farmer Brown's brother, Bob, who is farm-sitting for the vacationing Farmer Brown. Farmer Brown leaves a to-do list for Bob, but Duck is able to get hold of it and write his own list.

In 2003, Weston Woods Studios released a nine-minute animated version of the book, released as a bilingual DVD in 2004, the same year the book came out, and the video based on the book won the Carnegie Medal for Excellence in Children's Video.

== Backstory ==
Giggle, Giggle, Quack is a sequel featuring the barnyard animals first seen in Cronin and Lewin's Click, Clack, Moo: Cows That Type, which was awarded the Caldecott Honor in 2001.

== Plot ==
Farmer Brown leaves his brother, Bob, in charge of his farm while he goes to Hawaii for a vacation. Farmer Brown tells Bob to follow instructions and that everything should be fine. However, Duck gets a hold of a pencil Farmer Brown throws on the ground. Bob later finds reads the first note that says, "Tuesday night is Pizza night. (Not the frozen kind!). The hens prefer anchovies." The next day, another note has Bob wash the pigs. Farmer Brown calls Bob and suggests him to keep Duck inside the house. The following night, the animals sneak inside the living room to watch "the Sound of MOOSIC" for movie night, but Farmer Brown finds out about this when he calls and immediately comes back early from his vacation.

== See also ==
- Click, Clack, Moo
- Duck for President
- Dooby Dooby Moo
- Click, Clack, Splish, Splash
