= No Kimchi for Me! =

2017 picture book by Aram Kim

- Author: Aram Kim
- Language: English
- Genre: Children's picture book
- Publisher: Holiday House
- Publication date: September 5, 2017
- Publication place: United States
- Pages: 40
- ISBN: 9-780-8234-3919-5
- OCLC: 995285166
- Followed by: Let's Go to Taekwondo!
- Website: Author's website

No Kimchi for Me! is a children's picture book by Aram Kim. It was published on September 5, 2017, by Holiday House. The book tells the story of Yoomi, an anthropomorphic cat who doesn't like kimchi, and so is mocked by her older siblings. The illustrations are reminiscent of Kim's debut picture book, Cat on the Bus.

== Plot ==
Yoomi, the youngest of three, loves to eat the food her grandmother makes for her, except for kimchi, which she finds to be "stinky" and "spicy". Due to Yoomi's distaste for kimchi, her brothers belittle her, calling her a baby.

In an attempt to show her brothers they are wrong, Yoomi attempts to eat kimchi with a variety of other food, such as pizza slices and cookies, but to no avail. Yoomi's grandmother then decides to help by teaching the kitten how to make a savory kimchi pancake, which all the siblings end up liking.

== Background ==
While living in New York City, Aram Kim witnessed kimchi become a popular food in the city, and due to that decided to write a book about the subject. Kim began by writing the story, which is largely based on her own experiences from when she was younger, including her distaste for kimchi and trying to prove herself to her older brother. Kim first created a rough storyline of what she wanted the book to be about, and then wrote and created illustrations around that idea throughout the years.

During her initial sketches, Kim worked with a human, only child as her main character. After selling the publishing rights of the book to Holiday House, she received further feedback from her editor, Grace Maccarone, who suggested the addition of brothers, which, according to Kim, allowed the introduction of "more conflicts and drama". Another feedback Kim received from Maccarone was to instead use a cast of anthropomorphic cats based on some sketches the author had also sent. Although Kim considered using a human girl to promote diversity, she thought that the usage of Korean food already introduced that perspective to the final work.

Aram Kim's illustration process consisted of a mix of hand-drawing with pencil and digital coloring.

== Reception ==
Kirkus Reviews called it a "brisk, bright family story", and said it managed convey its familiar message "through a very specific cultural lens." The illustrations were praised by Kirkus and Publishers Weekly, mentioning its pastel colors as well as the use of digital manipulation, with the use of "unusual perspectives [...] add to their appeal."

Maria Salvadore, reviewing for the School Library Journal, also praises the illustrations, calling them "expressive, and childlike." Salvadore's verdict was that it "is broadly appealing".

The book received the "A Baker's Dozen: The Best Children's Books for Family Literacy" award by the Pennsylvania Center for the Book in 2018.
