= The Tea Rose =

Book by Jennifer Donnelly

- Author: Jennifer Donnelly
- Language: English
- Publisher: Thomas Dunne Books
- Publication date: October 1, 2002
- Publication place: United States
- ISBN: 9780312288358
- OCLC: 49672631
- Dewey Decimal: 813/.6
- LC Class: PS3604.O563 T43

The Tea Rose is a historical fiction novel by Jennifer Donnelly. It is the first book of a trilogy about London's East End at the turn of the 19th century. It was first published on October 1, 2002 by Thomas Dunne Books, an imprint of St. Martin's Press.

== Summary ==
In London in 1888, 17-year-old Fiona Finnegan, daughter of Irish immigrants Paddy and Kate, works under William Burton, owner and founder of Burton Tea. Paddy works as a docker in Whitechapel and is later called upon to lead the dockers to support labour unions. Fiona and her childhood sweetheart, Joe Bristow, remain hopeful that they will be able start their own grocery shop with the money that they save until Joe is tricked into marrying Fiona's rival, Millie Peterson. Soon after, her father is killed by slipping on grease and falling from a building window. Without her husband's wages to support them, Fiona's mother is forced to move her children from their childhood home. She is later murdered by Jack the Ripper when she finds him murdering her neighbor. Struck with grief at his mother's death, Fiona's younger brother Charlie runs away and is found dead in the Thames. Fiona and her little brother Seamie are taken in by their family friend, Roddy O'Meara, who lived with them in the previous home. In an attempt to receive compensation for her father's death, Fiona goes to William Burton's office. Instead, she overhears Burton and Bowler Sheehan, a harsh criminal, discussing Paddy's murder by Sheehan. Fiona flees, not realizing she took five hundred pounds in notes from Burton's desk. With Seamie in tow, Fiona flees London. When she flees, she meets someone named Nick Soames, and they pretended to be a couple due to the fact Fiona could not get a ticket for her and Seamie. When she goes to America, she has a quest to find her uncle Michael, who was also a shop owner. When she finds him, he is drunk because his wife had died from cholera, and he could not take care of his daughter, Nell. Fiona tells him to stop drinking and move on, but he can't. Michael was in debt with the bank and had to close his shop, but Fiona decides to open it up and start business with help from their neighbors.
