= Dooby Dooby Moo =

2006 picture book by Doreen Cronin

- Author: Doreen Cronin
- Cover artist: Betsy Lewin
- Language: English
- Series: Click, Clack, Moo
- Genre: picture book, children's literature
- Publisher: Atheneum Books
- Publication date: 2006
- Publication place: United States
- Pages: 40
- ISBN: 978-0-689-84507-9
- OCLC: 61694633
- Dewey Decimal: [E] 22
- LC Class: PZ7.C88135 Doo 2006
- Preceded by: Duck for President
- Followed by: N/A

Dooby Dooby Moo is a children's book written by Doreen Cronin and illustrated by Betsy Lewin. Released in 2006 by Atheneum Books, it continues the story of Farmer Brown's animals from Click, Clack, Moo: Cows That Type, who enter a talent show in an attempt to win a trampoline. The book has been adapted to a play and a 2007 13-minute animated short film narrated by Randy Travis and produced by Weston Woods Studios.

== Reception ==
Kirkus Reviews described the book as "great fun". humanities360.com said there's a "wild unpredictability [in the] drawings". lookingglassreview.com said the book is "sure to become a firm favorite".

== See also ==
- Click, Clack, Moo
- Giggle, Giggle, Quack
- Duck for President
