= Click, Clack, Splish, Splash =

2006 children's picturebook

Click, Clack, Splish, Splash: A Counting Adventure
- First edition cover
- Author: Doreen Cronin
- Original title: None
- Translator: None
- Illustrator: Betsy Lewin
- Cover artist: Lewin
- Language: English
- Series: Click, Clack
- Subject: Counting
- Genre: Children's literature
- Publisher: Atheneum Books for Young Readers
- Publication date: January 3, 2006
- Publication place: United States
- Media type: Print (Hardcover)
- Pages: 24
- ISBN: 978-0-689-87716-2
- Preceded by: Click, Clack, Quackity-Quack: An Alphabetical Adventure
- Followed by: N/A

Click, Clack, Splish, Splash: A Counting Adventure is a children's picture book written by Doreen Cronin and is illustrated by Betsy Lewin. Released in 2006 by Atheneum Books, it is one of the sequels to Click, Clack, Moo: Cows That Type.

== Plot ==
While the farmer sleeps on the couch close to the fishing tank, Duck and the barnyard animals sneak into the house on a quiet mission that involves "3 buckets piled high" outside the window and "4 chickens standing by". At the end of the book, the reader finds out that Duck's plan was the liberate the farmer's fish.

== Reception ==
A Publishers Weekly review says, "Though not quite as charming as its abecedarian cousin, this slight volume still offers a comical introduction to numerals one through 10. Lewin's black-outlined menagerie is as breezy as ever, tiptoeing, climbing or splashing through lots of white space to the final destination". A Kirkus Reviews review says, "A must-have sequel to all of Duck's adventures". Rosalyn Pierini, of School Library Journal reviewed the book saying, " A great tool for parents and teachers seeking to make learning fun".
