= Wiggle (book) =

Book by Doreen Cronin

- Author: Doreen Cronin
- Illustrator: Scott Menchin
- Language: English
- Genre: picturebook
- Published: 2005
- Publisher: Atheneum
- Publication place: United States

Wiggle is a children's picture book by Doreen Cronin and is illustrated by Scott Menchin. It was first published in 2005 by Atheneum Books for Young Readers.

== Plot ==
The book is about wiggling. For instance, "First wiggle where your tail would be. Then wiggle all your hair. Feeling extra silly? Wiggle in your underwear!"

== Reception ==
A Kirkus Reviews review says, "Though Menchin features a clearly drawn dog acting out most of the wiggles in his digitally drawn cartoons, a crocodile and a newly hatched bird are not posed in ways that provide visual cues. Still, not too bad a choice for preschoolers in need of a wiggle break". A School Library Journal review says, "Pair this sunny, silly book with Jonathan London's Wiggle Waggle (1999) or Katie Davis's Who Hops? (1998, both Harcourt) for an active storytime about animals in motion". Susan Dove Lempke, of Horn Book Magazine, reviewed the book saying, "This high-energy book will work well with young groups all the way to the end: “I think we’re out of wiggles now. See you wiggle soon!”".
