= Duck for President =

2004 children's book written by Doreen Cronin and illustrated by Betsy Lewin

- Author: Doreen Cronin
- Cover artist: Betsy Lewin
- Language: English
- Series: Click Clack Moo
- Genre: picture book, children's literature
- Publisher: Simon & Schuster
- Publication date: 2004
- Publication place: United States
- Pages: 40
- ISBN: 0-689-86377-2
- OCLC: 53223488
- Dewey Decimal: [E] 22
- LC Class: PZ7.C88135 Du 2004
- Preceded by: Giggle, Giggle, Quack
- Followed by: Dooby Dooby Moo

Duck for President is the title of a children's book written by Doreen Cronin and illustrated by Betsy Lewin. Released in 2004 through Simon & Schuster, The New York Times Best Illustrated Book follows the further adventures of Farmer Brown's animals that were introduced in Click, Clack, Moo: Cows That Type.

On April 9, 2007, the book was read by Laura Bush as part of the annual White House Easter egg roll. Weston Woods Studios released a 15-minute animated version of the book, released as a bilingual DVD in 2004, the same year the book came out.

== Plot summary ==
Duck becomes frustrated with Farmer Brown's rule over the farm, and holds an election to take over the farm. He goes to the mayor and governor's offices, then even visits the president. He then returns to the farm saying, "running a country is no fun at all."

== Reception ==
Responses to Duck For President have been generally favorable. Kirkus Reviews gave it a starred review and wrote "Lewin follows Cronin's lead in losing no opportunity to lampoon recognizable political figures." and "the comedy flows freely on more levels than one, and there's sufficient hilarity for all." while the School Library Journal noted "Lewin's characteristic humorous watercolors with bold black outlines fill the pages with color and jokes. Cronin's text is hilarious for kids and adults and includes a little math and quite a bit about the electoral process."

Publishers Weekly found "Though Cronin's latest Duck tale introduces the basic mechanics of the election process, it lacks many of the silly high jinks and clever plot turns that gave its predecessors their charm." but liked the illustrations calling them "a hoot". Common Sense Media found it an "Easy, funny intro to politics for your brood."

== Awards ==
- 2004 New York Times Best Illustrated Children's Book, joint winner
- 2005 Book Sense Children's Illustrated Book of the Year, winner

== See also ==
- U.S. Elections
