= Let's Go to Taekwondo! =

2017 picture book by Aram Kim

Let's Go to Taekwondo!: A Story about Persistence, Bravery, and Breaking Boards
- Author: Aram Kim
- Language: English
- Genre: Children's picture book
- Publisher: Holiday House
- Publication date: April 6, 2020
- Publication place: United States
- Pages: 40
- ISBN: 9-780-8234-4360-4
- OCLC: 1097462930
- Preceded by: No Kimchi for Me!
- Followed by: Sunday Funday in Koreatown
- Website: Author's website

Let's Go to Taekwondo!: A Story about Persistence, Bravery, and Breaking Boards is a 2020 children's picture book written and illustrated by Aram Kim. The book continues the story of Yoomi, an anthropormophic cat that first appeared in No Kimchi for Me!.

== Reception ==
Let's Go to Taekwondo! features Kim's "signature bold cartoon style," which includes the use of colored pencil and pastel tones, which are then composed digitally. Kirkus Reviews noted the diversity present in the book through the addition of different animals, as well as the incorporation of Korean words into the story. The reviewer by Publishers Weekly also praised the addition of Korean in the story, saying it lends "authenticity to this story, which will resonate with anyone who has faced down an obstacle."

Writing for The Booklist, Rhonny Khuri called the themes present in the story "an always-engaging subject and valuable lessons to make this a winner."
