= Library Lion =

2006 children's book by Michelle Knudsen

- Author: Michelle Knudsen
- Illustrator: Kevin Hawkes
- Language: English
- Publisher: Candlewick Press
- Publication date: July 25, 2006
- Publication place: United States
- Media type: Print (Paperback)
- Pages: 48
- ISBN: 978-0-7636-2262-6

Library Lion is a children's book written by Michelle Knudsen, illustrated by Kevin Hawkes, and released in 2006 by Candlewick Press. It is suitable for children ages 4–7.

== Plot summary ==
Miss Merriweather, the head librarian, enforces rules in the library, including prohibiting running and requiring visitors to remain quiet. When a lion enters the library, staff and visitors find there are no specific rules regarding lions. The lion adapts to the library environment: his feet are quiet on the floor, children lean against his back during story hour, and he does not roar in the library.

However, when something terrible happens, the lion quickly comes to the rescue in the only way he knows how.

== Reception ==
In School Library Journal, Kathy Krasniewicz called Library Lion "a winsome pairing of text and illustration" adding that it is a "natural for story time and a first purchase for every collection".

The book was translated in Israel into Hebrew by Irit Erb (Kinneret Zmora-Bitan, 2008) and adapted to a play by Eli Bijaoui and directed by Roni Pinkovitch.
