= Diary of a Spider =

2005 children's book by Doreen Cronin

- Author: Doreen Cronin
- Illustrator: Harry Bliss
- Pages: 32
- ISBN: 9780545242912
- Preceded by: Diary of a Worm

Diary of a Spider is a children's picture book published in the year 2005 by Harper Collins Publishers as a sequel to Diary of a Worm (WD). It is written by Doreen Cronin and it is illustrated by Harry Bliss. In 2006, Weston Woods Studio adapted this book to film, narrated by Angus T. Jones, and directed by Gene Deitch.

== Plot ==
The book is a diary written by a spider. The diary has things such as pictures of Spider's family, a picture of his favorite book, a discovery of a sculpture, and a playbill from the school's production of "Itsy Bitsy Spider". There is also a slight storyline about Spider's friendship with Fly and Grampa hating bugs with six legs. The worm from Diary of a Worm makes occasional appearances.

== Reception ==
A Publishers Weekly review says, "This endearing book delivers a gentle message that comes through when Spider muses, "I wish that people wouldn't judge all spiders based on the few spiders that bite. I know if we took the time to get to know each other, we would get along just fine. Just like me and Fly." A Kirkus Reviews review says, "Spider closes with the notion that we could all get along, "just like me and Fly," if we but got to know one another. Once again, brilliantly hilarious". Susan Dove Lempke, of Horn Book Magazine, reviewed the book saying, "Kid humor and spider humor (not to mention worm humor) seem remarkably similar, so expect this second Diary to be just as popular as the first."

== Award ==
- Children's Illustrated Honor Books in the 2006 Book Sense Book of the Year Awards
