= Grace Maccarone =

Children's author and editor

- Writing career
- Genre: Children's literature
- Notable work: Miss Lina’s Ballerinas

Grace Maccarone is an American children’s book editor and author, notably of Miss Lina’s Ballerinas, illustrated by Christine Davenier, and its sequel Miss Lina’s Ballerinas and the Prince. She has also worked as an editor at Scholastic, Wireless Generation, and currently Holiday House.

== Partial bibliography ==
- The Haunting of Grade Three, illustrated by Kelly Oechsli, Scholastic, 1987
- Itchy, Itchy Chicken Pox, illustrated by Betsy Lewin, Cartwheel, 1992
- The Sword in the Stone, illustrated by Joe Boddy, Scholastic, 1992
- Oink! Moo! How Do You Do?, illustrated by Hans Wilhelm, Cartwheel, 1994
- Pizza Party, illustrated by Emily Arnold McCully, Scholastic, 1994
- Soccer Game!, by Meredith Johnson, Cartwheel, 1994
- The Classroom Pet, Scholastic, 1995
- My Tooth Is About to Fall Out, illustrated by Betsy Lewin, Cartwheel, 1995
- The First Grade Friends: Lunch Box Surprise, illustrated by Betsy Lewin, Cartwheel, 1995
- Monster Math, illustrated by Marge Hartelius, Scholastic, 1995
- First Grade Friends: Recess Mess, illustrated by Betsy Lewin, Scholastic, 1996
- The Silly Story of Goldie Locks and The Three Squares, 1996
- Monster Math School Time, illustrated by Marge Hartelius, Scholastic, 1997
- Monster Money, with Marilyn Burns, Cartwheel, 1998
- Monster Math Picnic, Cartwheel, 1998
- Three Pigs, One Wolf, Seven Magic Shapes, illustrated by David Neuhaus, with math activities by Marilyn Burns, Cartwheel, 1998
- What Is That? Said the Cat, illustrated by Jeffrey Scherer, Cartwheel, 1998
- A Child Was Born: A First Nativity Book, illustrated by Sam Williams, Scholastic, 2000
- Dinosaurs, illustrated by Richard Courtney, Scholastic, 2001
- A Child’s Goodnight Prayer, illustrated by Sam Williams, Cartwheel, 2001
- Miss Lina’s Ballerinas, illustrated by Christine Davenier, Feiwel & Friends, 2010
- Miss Lina’s Ballerinas and the Prince, illustrated by Christine Davenier, Feiwel & Friends, 2011
- Miss Lina’s Ballerinas and the Wicked Wish, illustrated by Christine Davenier, Feiwel & Friends, 2012
- Princess Tales: Once Upon a Time in Rhyme with Seek-and-Find Pictures, illustrated by Gail de Marcken, Feiwel & Friends, 2013
- A Day with Miss Lina's Ballerinas, illustrated by Christine Davenier, Square Fish, 2014
