= Click, Clack, Moo =

2000 picture book by Doreen Cronin

Click, Clack, Moo: Cows That Type
- Front cover, designed by Betsy Lewin
- Author: Doreen Cronin
- Cover artist: Betsy Lewin
- Language: English
- Genre: picture book, children's literature
- Publisher: Simon & Schuster
- Publication date: 2000
- Publication place: United States
- Pages: 32
- ISBN: 978-0-689-83213-0
- OCLC: 41130977
- Dewey Decimal: [E] 21
- LC Class: PZ7.C88135 Cl 2000
- Preceded by: N/A
- Followed by: Giggle, Giggle, Quack

Click, Clack, Moo: Cows That Type is a 2000 children's book written by Doreen Cronin. Illustrated by Betsy Lewin, the Simon & Schuster book tells the story of Farmer Brown's cows, who find an old typewriter in the barn and proceed to write letters to Farmer Brown, making various demands and then going on strike when they are not met.

A book and CD edition was also released, with the CD being narrated by Rik Mayall. The CD features three tracks; tracks one and three featuring the story being read with background music and sound effect track, and track two being solely the story without added audio.

== Plot ==
When Farmer Brown begins to hear typing sounds coming from his barn, he discovers that his cows have found an old typewriter in the barn and are using it to type letters requesting things from Farmer Brown, such as electric blankets to keep them warm at night. Farmer Brown refuses, and the cows withhold their milk until they get what they ask for. Soon, the cows type a similar letter on behalf of the hens also asking for blankets, which Farmer Brown refuses to provide. The hens join the cows and refuse to lay eggs.

To re-establish order, Farmer Brown sends a letter back to the cows and hens on his own typewriter and tells them they do not need the blankets and that their job is to produce milk and eggs, which he has a neutral duck deliver to the cows, who hold an emergency meeting (during that time, the other animals gather at the barn door to see what's going on) in which they come to a resolution. They promise the farmer that if he gives them the blankets, they will give him their typewriter. The duck from earlier agrees to deliver the typewriter once the cows and hens have the blankets.

Farmer Brown decides the deal is fair, so he leaves the electric blankets for the cows and waits for the duck to deliver the typewriter. Instead of delivering the typewriter, the ducks send him a letter which states that their pond is boring, and they would like a diving board, which they get.

== Reception ==
Click, Clack, Moo: Cows That Type is a 2001 Caldecott Honor book. Based on a 2007 online poll, the National Education Association included it on a list of "Teachers' Top 100 Books for Children", and it was listed as one of the "Top 100 Picture Books" of all time in a 2012 poll by School Library Journal.

== Adaptations ==
In 2001, Weston Woods Studios adapted the book to an animated movie narrated by Randy Travis and animation by MaGik Studios.

The PBS series Between the Lions featured the book in the episode "Clickety-Clack, Clickety-Clack!"

There have been two animated Christmas specials based on the book series, namely Click, Clack, Ho! Ho! Ho! (November 2016) and Click, Clack, Moo: Christmas at the Farm (November 28, 2017).

Click Clack Moosic, a series of musical story time events with music by Phil Popham, was commissioned by the West Michigan Symphony Orchestra in 2014.

A Click, Clack, Moo musical was created by Billy Aronson, Kevin Del Aguila, and Brad Alexander for TheatreWorksUSA.

== See also ==
- Giggle, Giggle, Quack
- Click, Clack, Splish, Splash
- Duck for President
- Dooby Dooby Moo
