= Llama Llama (TV series) =

Animated television series, 2018–2019

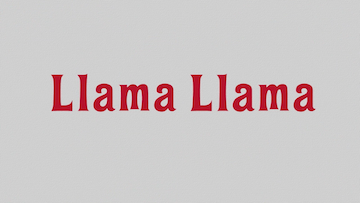
- Genre: Children's animation
- Created by: Anna Dewdney; Reed Duncan; Jane Startz
- Based on: Llama Llama by Anna Dewdney
- Directed by: Saul Blinkoff
- Voices of: Shayle Simons; Jennifer Garner
- Composer: George Gabriel
- Countries of origin: United States; Ireland
- Original language: English
- No. of seasons: 2
- No. of episodes: 25 (48 segments)

Production
- Executive producers: Joseph Purdy; Ruben Aquino; Jane Startz; Andy Heyward
- Producer: Reed Duncan
- Running time: 24 minutes
- Production companies: Genius Brands; Telegael

Original release
- Network: Netflix
- Release: January 26, 2018 – November 15, 2019

Llama Llama is a children's animated television series that premiered on January 26, 2018, on Netflix. Co-produced by Genius Brands and Telegael Teoranta and based on the books by Anna Dewdney, the series follows an anthropomorphic llama named Llama Llama (voiced by Shayle Simons) living with his Mama Llama (voiced by Jennifer Garner) in a town that is run by anthropomorphic animals where he learns about fun, friendship and new things. The series was produced by Reed Duncan, Dewdney's longtime partner, doing so in tribute to her. The second season was released on November 15, 2019.

== Cast and characters ==
- Shayle Simons as Llama Llama, the protagonist and a playful llama who loves to have fun.
- Jennifer Garner as Mama Llama, Llama's mama.
- Alistair Abell as Billy Goat, Gilroy's brother whose appearance slightly resembles Euclid.
- Austin Abell as Gilroy Goat, an ornery goat who was a spoil sport and a bully when first introduced, but got nicer over time.
- Vania Gill as Luna Giraffe, an upbeat and warm-hearted giraffe with a gentle voice who loves art and has a bit of a girly personality.
- Islie Hirvonen as Nelly Gnu, a sassy gnu who loves to paint, but commonly riding her skateboard.
- Evans Johnson as Zelda Zebra, a zebra who is Llama's teacher, her husband is a horse named Happy and has two horse children.
- Grady Ainscough as Roland Rhino, a rhinoceros.
- Grady Ainscough as Harold Hackney, a horse who is one of Zelda Zebra's children.
- Kathleen Barr as Grandma Llama, Llama's grandmother who has a slight British accent.
- David Orth/David Poole as Grandpa Llama, Llama's grandfather, he speaks with a bit of an Irish accent.
- Brenden Sunderland as Euclid Sheep, a sheep who likes math/science.
- Vincent Tong as Officer Flamingo, a police flamingo.
- Mei Onischak as Audrey Antelope, an antelope who is a congenital amputee as she has a prosthetic left leg and no right elbow, forearm or hand.
- Vincent Tong as Daddy Gnu, Nelly's father who hires a bakery.
- Kathleen Barr as Mama Gnu, Nelly's mother.
- Kathleen Barr as Lenora Leopard, a leopard who works as a librarian and a musician.
- Kathleen Barr/Franciska Friede as Ramona Rhino, Roland's sister.
- Franciska Friede as Hilda Hackney, a pony with a somewhat English accent and is Zelda's daughter. Her last name comes from Hackney London.
- Kathleen Barr as Eleanor Elephant, an elephant chef who speaks with a thick British accent.

== Episodes ==
=== Series overview ===
Season	Episodes	Originally released
1	15	January 26, 2018
2	10	November 15, 2019

=== Season 1 (2018) ===
No. overall	No. in season	Title	Written by	Original release date
1	1	"Zoom! Zoom! Zoom!"	S : Reed Duncan; T : Michelle Lamoreaux	January 26, 2018
1	1	"Lost Tooth"	S : Reed Duncan; T : Ariel Shepherd-Oppenheim	January 26, 2018
"Zoom! Zoom! Zoom!" is based on "Zippity Zoom" (2012).
2	2	"Last Day of Summer"	Joe Purdy	January 26, 2018
2	2	"Bully Goat"	S : Anna Dewdney; T : Joe Purdy	January 26, 2018
"Bully Goat" is based on "The Bully Goat" (2013) where Gilroy Goat made his first appearance. The episode also appears to be set at Christmas time.
3	3	"Forgotten Fuzzy"	S : Anna Dewdney; T : Corey Powell	January 26, 2018
3	3	"Home with Mama"	S : Anna Dewdney; T : Peter Hunziker	January 26, 2018
Based on two books that were published in 2015 and 2011.
4	4	"Llama Llama Red Pajama"	S : Anna Dewdney; T : Noelle Wright	January 26, 2018
4	4	"Time to Share"	S : Anna Dewdney; T : Ariel Shepherd-Oppenheim	January 26, 2018
Based on two books that were published in 2005 and 2012.
5	5	"Llama Llama Shopping Drama"	S : Anna Dewdney; T : Elise Allen	January 26, 2018
5	5	"Lucky Pajamas"	S : Reed Duncan; T : Elise Allen	January 26, 2018
"Llama Llama Shopping Drama" is based on "Llama Llama Mad at Mama" (2007).
6	6	"Snow Show"	S : Jane Startz; T : Rachel Lipman	January 26, 2018
6	6	"Secret Santa"	Joe Purdy	January 26, 2018
The first of two Christmas episodes. Although "Snow Show" is classified as a Christmas episode, it does not refer to Christmas time like the latter episode.
7	7	"Spring Fever"	Joe Purdy	January 26, 2018
7	7	"Happy Birthday, Llama Llama!"	S : Jane Startz, Reed Duncan & Joe Purdy; T : Peter Hunziker	January 26, 2018
"Spring Fever" takes place sometime in March, while "Happy Birthday Llama Llama" is a birthday episode.
8	8	"Llama Llama Lemonade"	S : Jane Startz, Reed Duncan & Joe Purdy; T : Noelle Wright	January 26, 2018
8	8	"Stage Fright"	S : Reed Duncan & Anna Dewdney; T : Noelle Wright	January 26, 2018
"Llama Llama Lemonade" takes place around July or August.
9	9	"Sleepover at Gilroy's"	S : Reed Duncan; T : Peter Hunziker	January 26, 2018
9	9	"Noisy Neighbor"	S : Reed Duncan; T : Corey Powell	January 26, 2018
"Noisy Neighbor" was not the first appearance of the British elephant, Eleanor, who first made her early appearance without her name on "Llama Llama and Friends" (2017), which is one of the first books without Anna's involvement after she died.
10	10	"Coach Llama Llama"	S : Jane Startz, Reed Duncan & Joe Purdy; T : Peter Hunziker	January 26, 2018
10	10	"Jealous Nelly"	S : Reed Duncan; T : Michelle Lamoreaux & Robert Lamoreaux	January 26, 2018
11	11	"Llama Llama Trick or Treat"	S : Jane Startz, Reed Duncan & Joe Purdy; T : Ariel Shepherd-Oppenheim	January 26, 2018
11	11	"Boat Float"	S : Jane Startz; T : Noelle Wright	January 26, 2018
"Llama Llama Trick or Treat" is a Halloween episode based on the board book of the same name published in 2014, while "Boat Float" takes place afterwards.
12	12	"Beach Day"	S : Jane Startz, Reed Duncan & Joe Purdy; T : Joe Ansolabehere	January 26, 2018
12	12	"Mama Llama's Mother's Day"	S : Jane Startz, Reed Duncan & Joe Purdy; T : Elise Allen	January 26, 2018
"Beach Day" is based on "Sand and Sun" (2015).
13	13	"Saving Luna's Necklace"	S : Jane Startz; T : Rachel Lipman	January 26, 2018
13	13	"Let's Go Camping"	Joe Purdy	January 26, 2018
14	14	"Llama Llama and the Babysitter"	S : Reed Duncan; T : Joe Ansolabehere	January 26, 2018
14	14	"Job Day"	Joe Purdy	January 26, 2018
"Llama Llama and the Babysitter" was later adapted into "Llama Llama Meets the Babysitter" (2021).
15	15	"Llama Llama Loves to Read"	S : Jane Startz; T : Rachel Lipman	January 26, 2018
15	15	"I Heart You!"	S : Reed Duncan & Anna Dewdney; T : Corey Powell	January 26, 2018
"I Heart You" is a Valentine's Day episode based on "I Love You" (2014). The latter episode is in February when there is usually still snow in England at that point.

=== Season 2 (2019) ===
Season 2 was released on November 15, 2019. Although the order below reflects the order in which the episodes are listed on Netflix, Netflix's on-screen display carries the notation "Watch In Any Order".

No. overall	No. in season	Title	Written by	Original release date
16	1	"Three Friends and a Baby Newman"	Rachel Lipman	November 15, 2019
16	1	"New Neighbors"	Peter Hunziker	November 15, 2019
"Three Friends and a Baby Newman" is named after Touchstone Pictures' film, Three Men and a Baby.
17	2	"Llama Llama Talent Show"	Joe Purdy	November 15, 2019
17	2	"Llama Llama's Lie"	Rachel Lipman	November 15, 2019
18	3	"Loch Ness Llama"	Rachel Lipman	November 15, 2019
18	3	"Band Together"	Ariel Shepherd-Oppenheim	November 15, 2019
19	4	"Doctor Visit"	Joe Ansolabehere	November 15, 2019
19	4	"Daddy's Day"	Analise McNeill	November 15, 2019
"Doctor Visit" is the first extensive speaking role of Hilda Hackney's dad, while "Daddy's Day" is based on "Nelly Gnu and Daddy Too" (2014).
20	5	"Llama Llama Light Show"	Peter Hunziker	November 15, 2019
20	5	"Luna's Perfect Leaf"	Rachel Lipman	November 15, 2019
21	6	"The Snow Must Go On"	Peter Hunziker	November 15, 2019
21	6	"Message in a Bottle"	Peter Hunziker	November 15, 2019
"The Snow Must Go On" is the third Christmas episode and takes place at the beginning of December.
22	7	"New Year, New Me"	Corey Powell	November 15, 2019
New Years episode
23	8	"Story Island"	Rachel Lipman	November 15, 2019
23	8	"The New Toy"	David Skelly	November 15, 2019
"The New Toy" is Molly Badger's cameo appearance.
24	9	"Thanks-for-Giving Day"	Rachel Lipman	November 15, 2019
24	9	"Finding Dion"	Peter Hunziker	November 15, 2019
"Thanks-for-Giving Day" is a reference to Thanksgiving and said episode is based on "Llama Llama Gives Thanks" (2017).
25	10	"Llama Family Vacation"	Joe Purdy	November 15, 2019
Llama and his family leave England on vacation for Sandy Island.
