= Harry Bliss =

American cartoonist (born 1964)

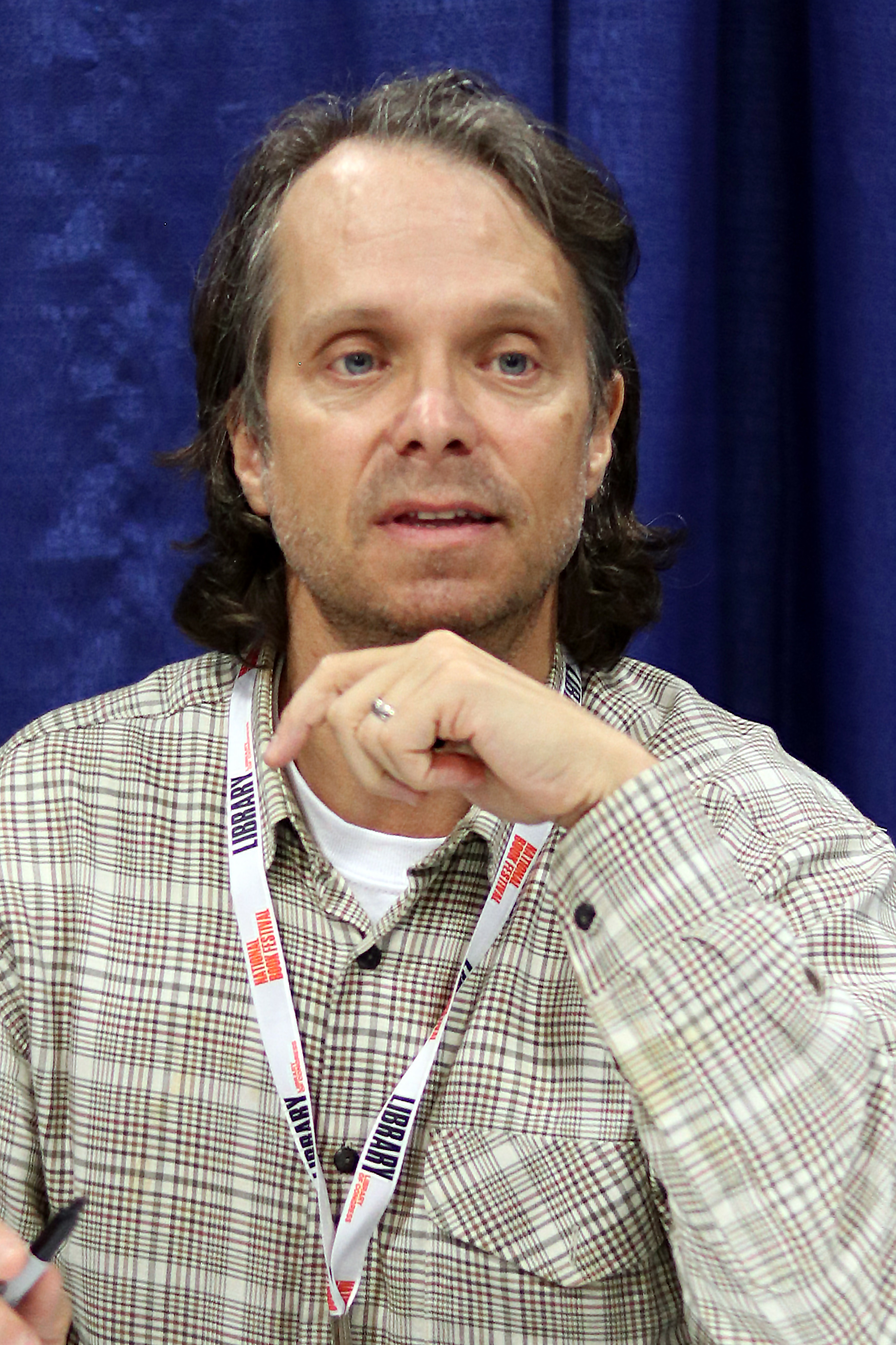
- Bliss at the 2018 U.S. National Book Festival
- Born: March 9, 1964 (age 62) Rochester, New York, U.S.
- Area: cartoonist
- Notable works: Bliss
- Awards: Maurice Sendak Fellowship, 2014

Harry Bliss (born March 9, 1964) is an American cartoonist and illustrator. He has illustrated many books and produced thousands of cartoons including 25 covers for The New Yorker. He has a syndicated single-panel comic titled Bliss. Bliss is syndicated through Tribune Content Agency and appears in over 80 newspapers in the United States, Canada, and Japan.

== Early life and education ==
Bliss grew up in New York State in an artistic family. There are eleven working visual artists in his immediate and extended family. He studied painting at the Pennsylvania Academy of Fine Arts and illustration at the University of the Arts, earning a Bachelor of Fine Arts and later an M.A. from Syracuse University.

== Career ==
Bliss has been a staff cartoonist at The New Yorker magazine since 1997. His cartoon work has been published in The New York Times, Time magazine, the Philadelphia Inquirer magazine, and other periodicals in the United States. He was a regular cartoonist for Playboy magazine from 1999 to 2016. He worked with cartoon editor Michelle Urry at Playboy. Urry, a strong advocate for cartoonists like Gahan Wilson, Jules Feiffer, and Arnold Roth was responsible for getting Bliss's cartoons into the hands of Playboy editor Hugh Hefner. Bliss dedicated Louise, the Adventures of a Chicken to Urry after her untimely death in 2006. His self-titled daily single-panel cartoon appears in major newspapers in the United States, Canada, and Japan. Bliss has published over 5,668 cartoons since 2005.

Bliss' first book for children, A Fine, Fine School, written by Sharon Creech, was a Children's Picture Book New York Times bestseller, as were Diary of a Worm, Diary of a Spider, and Diary of a Fly (all written by Doreen Cronin). Beginning in 2019, Amazon Studios began airing a children's series 'Bug Diaries' based on these best-selling titles. His self-titled cartoon collection Death by Laughter, with an introduction by Christopher Guest, was published in 2008. In 2008 Bliss published Louise, The Adventures of a Chicken (HarperCollins), written by Kate DiCamillo.

In 2008, Bliss, advised by editorial team Art Spiegelman and Françoise Mouly, contributed a popular and critically acclaimed Toon Book, Luke On The Loose, which was the first book written and illustrated in comic book form by the artist.

Bailey, a picture book for children written and illustrated by Bliss, was published by Scholastic in the fall of 2011 and followed by Bailey At the Museum in 2012. Then he illustrated Anna and Solomon published by FSG (written by his mother-in-law, Elaine Snyder). In April 2015 Grandma in Blue With Red Hat, illustrated by Bliss, was published by Abrams. Most recent illustrated children's books include My Favorite Pets: By Gus W. For Miss Smolinski's Class by Jeanne Birdsall (Knopf 2016), Grace for Gus (HarperCollins 2018), Good, Rosie by DiCamillo (Candlewick 2018) and Comics Confidential by Leonard Marcus.

In 2019 Bliss teamed up with entertainer Steve Martin, collaborating on cartoons and comic strips. Celadon Books published their best-selling cartoon collection 'A Wealth of Pigeons' in the fall of 2020. Bliss and Martin published their second book together, ‘Number One is Walking: My Life in the Movies and Other Diversions’ in November of 2022. Both were New York Times bestsellers. Celadon published Bliss’ cartoon memoir, ‘You Can Never Die,’ in 2025.

Bliss has been on the board of directors for The Center for Cartoon Studies (CCS) which is based in White River Junction, Vermont. In 2016, in conjunction with CCS, Bliss created a new one-month fellowship for cartoonists, the "Cornish CCS Residency Fellowship," housed in a home in Cornish, New Hampshire which he bought (it was owned by author J. D. Salinger). As an animal rights activist, Bliss has regularly contributed covers for PETA's Animal Times magazine and designed sculptures for PETA which have appeared in major American cities in an ongoing effort to stop animal suffering. McDonald's, Ringling Brothers Circus, and Kentucky Fried Chicken are among the prime targets of Bliss's and PETAs efforts.

Since 2004, Bliss has visited many schools and interacted with thousands of children teaching comics/drawing/satire. He has traveled to Peru, Bucharest, Moscow, Saint Petersburg, Singapore, and Dubai as well as within the United States. The goal with the school visits is to demonstrate the need for creating critical thinking through drawing. With accessible language and a team of educators supported by interactive “scribble” games, Bliss seeks to open children to new critical perspectives that emerge through the act of drawing.

== Controversy ==
The May 12, 2008 edition of The New Yorker magazine published in its weekly caption-writing contest a cartoon by Bliss which closely resembled Jack Kirby's cover of Tales to Astonish #34 (Aug. 1962). Intended by Bliss as an homage and tribute to Kirby, critics complained that the magazine did not mention Kirby's name. After being notified by readers and the media, the magazine said it would update its web site to read, "Drawing by Harry Bliss, after Jack Kirby".

In 2010 a New Yorker cover by Bliss, Paint by Pixels, was compared to Norman Rockwell's Saturday Evening Post cover, The Connoisseur. Author Virginia Mecklenburg writes in Telling Stories: Norman Rockwell from the collections of George Lucas and Steven Spielberg, "But for those who know The Connoisseur, Bliss's cover goes a step further. The painting they (a young couple) observe is not a Pollock at all, but a re-creation of Rockwell's Pollock."

== Personal life ==
As of 2016, Bliss lives in Cornish, New Hampshire.

== Awards ==
Bliss, along with fellow artist Nora Krug, was a recipient of the 2014 Maurice Sendak Fellowship.

== Publications ==
- A Fine, Fine School, written by Sharon Creech (Scholastic, 2002)
- Countdown To Kindergarten, written by Alison McGhee (Scholastic, 2002)
- Which Would You Rather Be?, written by William Steig (HarperCollins, 2002)
- Diary of a Worm, written by Doreen Cronin (Scholastic, 2003)
- Don't Forget To Come Back, written by Robie H. Harris (Walker Books, 2004)
- Mrs. Watson Wants Your Teeth, written by Alison McGhee (Harcourt, 2004)
- Diary of a Spider, written by Doreen Cronin (HarperCollins, 2005)
- A Very Brave Witch, written by Alison McGhee (Scholastic, 2006)
- Diary of a Fly, written by Doreen Cronin (HarperCollins, 2007)
- Death by Laughter, by Harry Bliss; Introduction by Christopher Guest (Abrams, 2008)
- Luke On The Loose (Toon Books, 2008)
- Louise, The Adventures of a Chicken, written by Kate DiCamillo (HarperCollins, 2008)
- Invisible Inkling, written by Emily Jenkins (HarperCollins, 2011)
- Bailey (Scholastic, 2011)
- Bailey at the Museum (Scholastic, 2012)
- Anna & Solomon, written by Elaine Snyder (Farrar, Straus and Giroux, 2014)
- The Sweetest Witch Around, written by Alison McGhee (Simon & Schuster, 2014)
- Grandma in Blue With Red Hat (Abrams, 2015)
- My Favorite Pets by Gus W. For Mrs. Smolinski's Class by Jeanne Birdsall (Knopf 2016)
- Grace for Gus (Katherine Tegen, 2018)
- Good Rosie by Kate DiCamillo (Candlewick, 2018)
- A Wealth of Pigeons with Steve Martin (Celadon, 2020)
- Number One Is Walking with Steve Martin (Celadon, 2022)
- You Can Never Die (Celadon, 2025)
