= Anna Dewdney =

American author and illustrator (1965-2016

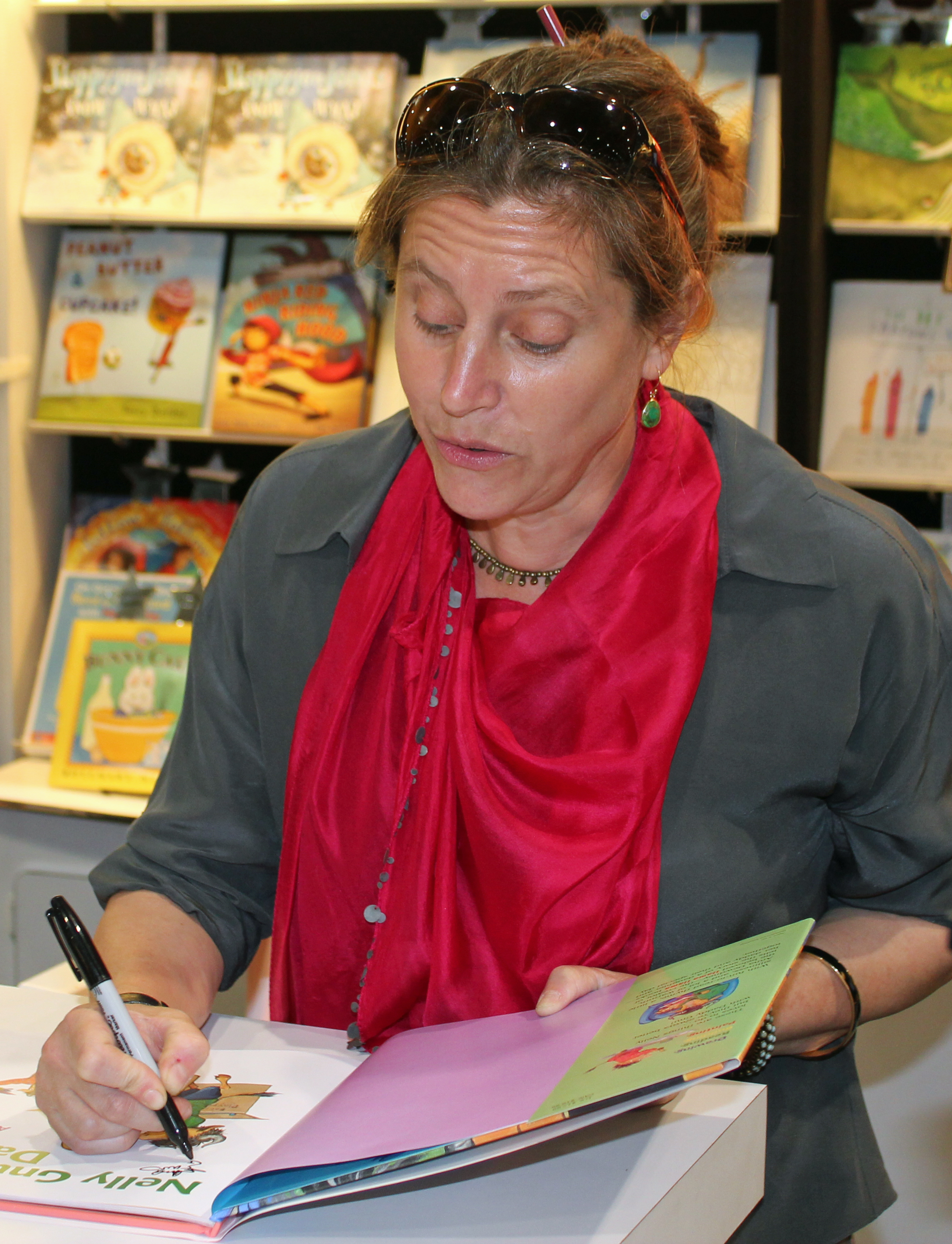
- Dewdney at a book signing in 2014
- Born: Anna Elizabeth Luhrmann; December 25, 1965; NYC
- Died: September 3, 2016 (aged 50); Chester, Vermont, U.S.
- Education: Wesleyan University (BA)
- Occupations: Author, illustrator
- Partner: Reed Duncan
- Writing career
- Years active: 2005–2016
- Genre: Juvenile fiction
- Notable work: Llama Llama series
- Website: llamallamabook.com

Anna Elizabeth Dewdney (née Luhrmann; December 25, 1965 – September 3, 2016) was an American author and illustrator of children's books. The first book she wrote and illustrated, Llama Llama Red Pajama, received critical acclaim in 2005. She wrote numerous other books in the Llama Llama series, which have all been New York Times bestsellers. Her work has been adapted into stage plays, dance performances, musicals, and an animated television series for Netflix. Many states and non-profits use her books for literacy campaigns and programs, including the Library of Congress. The text of her work is often written in verse, and is known for its emotive content and focus on family relationships.

== Biography ==
Dewdney spent her early childhood in Englewood, New Jersey. She had two sisters, including anthropologist Tanya Luhrmann.

She attended The Elisabeth Morrow School through the ninth grade. She continued her high school studies at Phillips Academy (Andover) and then transferred to The Putney School, graduating in 1985. She earned a bachelor's degree in Art from Wesleyan University in 1987.

Before her work became well-known, Dewdney worked as a waitress, a rural postal carrier, and a remedial language, art and history teacher at the Greenwood School with her partner, Reed Duncan.

She and Duncan lived in Vermont until her death at age 50 from complications of brain cancer.

== Career ==
Dewdney began her career illustrating a variety of books for both children and adults. She gained critical acclaim in 2005 for Llama Llama Red Pajama, the first book she both wrote and illustrated. Her work is known for its emotive content, signature characters, family relationships, and how it addresses the everyday issues of young children. The text of her work is often written in verse; because of this use of rhyming language, and because of Dewdney's reading-advocacy work, her books are often used to promote reading and literacy.

The Llama Llama series is highly popular among parents, teachers, and booksellers; in 2011, a Miami, Florida bookseller had the Llama Llama character tattooed on her arm for a bookstore event.

Dewdney's books have been translated into more than thirteen languages, including Chinese, Hebrew, Korean, Indonesian, Vietnamese, Polish, Spanish, Russian, Latvian, Romanian, Hungarian, Italian, and German.

Partial proceeds from some of her works go toward environmental awareness and conservation efforts, most notably pangolin conservation in southeast Asia.

Llama Llama was adapted as an animated children's television series for Netflix. The show was produced by Genius Brands and was initially directed by Rob Minkoff and Saul Andrew Blinkoff. Jane Startz served as the series producer, and Joe Purdy was the series showrunner. Reed Duncan, the show's co-creator, served as executive producer. Duncan, Startz, and Purdy wrote and created all of the show's main storylines. Dewdney and Duncan wrote the lyrics for the signature theme song. The series has been translated into over 22 different languages and is broadcast in dozens of countries worldwide.

== Influences ==
Dewdney cited Tasha Tudor, the early work of Maurice Sendak, Russell Hoban, Garth Williams, Barbara Cooney, Elizabeth Goudge, Frances Hodgson Burnett, William Steig, E. B. White, Munro Leaf, and Robert Lawson as creative influences.

== Awards and honors ==
Dewdney's Llama Llama books have all been New York Times bestsellers, and several titles have reached #1 on the list. Her books regularly make the Publishers Weekly and IndieBooks bestsellers lists, and have hit buzzworthy sales figures.

Llama Llama Red Pajama was chosen as Jumpstart's Read for the Record book in 2011, setting the world's record for most readings of a particular book on one day. This event was recorded on the Today show on October 6 of the same year, where her work was read live to the national television audience.

Dewdney's work has been adapted into stage plays, dance performances, and musicals, most notably by Dolly Parton at Dollywood. The Dolly Parton Foundation also chose her Llama Llama series for The Imagination Library, a not-for-profit organization serving young children through book donations.

Many states and not-for-profit organizations use Dewdney's books for literacy campaigns and programs, including the Library of Congress, which featured her work and a live reading by Dewdney at its 2012 National Book Festival.

Dewdney's work is highly acclaimed by critics and is often recommended on booklists by national reviewers.

=== Other awards ===
- Llama Llama Red Pajama: Scholastic Parent and Child "100 Greatest Books for Kids" award winner; Bank Street "Best Children's Book" recipient; Missouri Building Block Award winner; National Public Radio pick; Carolina Children's Book Award Master List winner (picture book category)
- Llama Llama Home With Mama: Children's Choice Book Award "Illustrator of the Year" nominee (2012)
- Llama Llama Time to Share: Children's Choice book Award "Illustrator of the Year" nominee (2013); Thriving Family magazine's Best Family-Friendly Picture Book finalist (2012)
- Llama Llama Mad at Mama: Missouri Building Block Award winner; winner of Alabama's Emphasis on Reading program (grades K-1); Book Sense Book of the Year Children's Illustrated Honor Book (2008)

== Selected works ==
- What You Do Is Easy, What I Do Is Hard (her first picture book - illustrator only, written by Jake Wolf)
- Grumpy Gloria
- Llama Llama Hoppity-Hop
- Llama Llama and the Bully Goat
- Llama Llama Holiday Drama
- Llama Llama Home With Mama
- Llama Llama Mad at Mama
- Llama Llama Misses Mama
- Llama Llama Nighty-Night
- Llama Llama Red Pajama
- Llama Llama Time To Share
- Llama Llama Gram and Grandpa
- Llama Llama Zippity-Zoom
- Llama Llama Wakey-Wake
- Llama Llama Sand & Sun
- Llama Llama Easter Egg
- Llama Llama I Love You
- Llama Llama Jingle Bells
- Llama Llama Trick or Treat
- Nelly Gnu and Daddy Too
- Nobunny's Perfect
- Roly Poly Pangolin
- Llama Llama Birthday Party!
- Little Excavator (posthumous, June 6, 2017)
- Llama Llama Gives Thanks (posthumous, August 15, 2017)
- Llama Llama TV series (posthumous, January 26, 2018)
- Llama Llama Loves to Read
- Llama Llama Mess, Mess, Mess
- Llama Llama Loose Tooth Drama (posthumous, November 17, 2020)
- Everything Will Be OK (posthumous, February 15, 2022)
- Animalicious
- Llama Llama Yum, Yum, Yum
- Llama Llama Hide & Seek
- Llama Llama 5-Minute Stories
- Llama Llama Mad Libs Junior
- Llama Llama & Me: My Book of Memories
- What's Your Favorite Color? (one of several contributors for the Eric Carle collection)
- Christmas in the Barn (illustration for the Margaret Wise Brown work)
