= Jennifer Donnelly =

American novelist (born 1963)

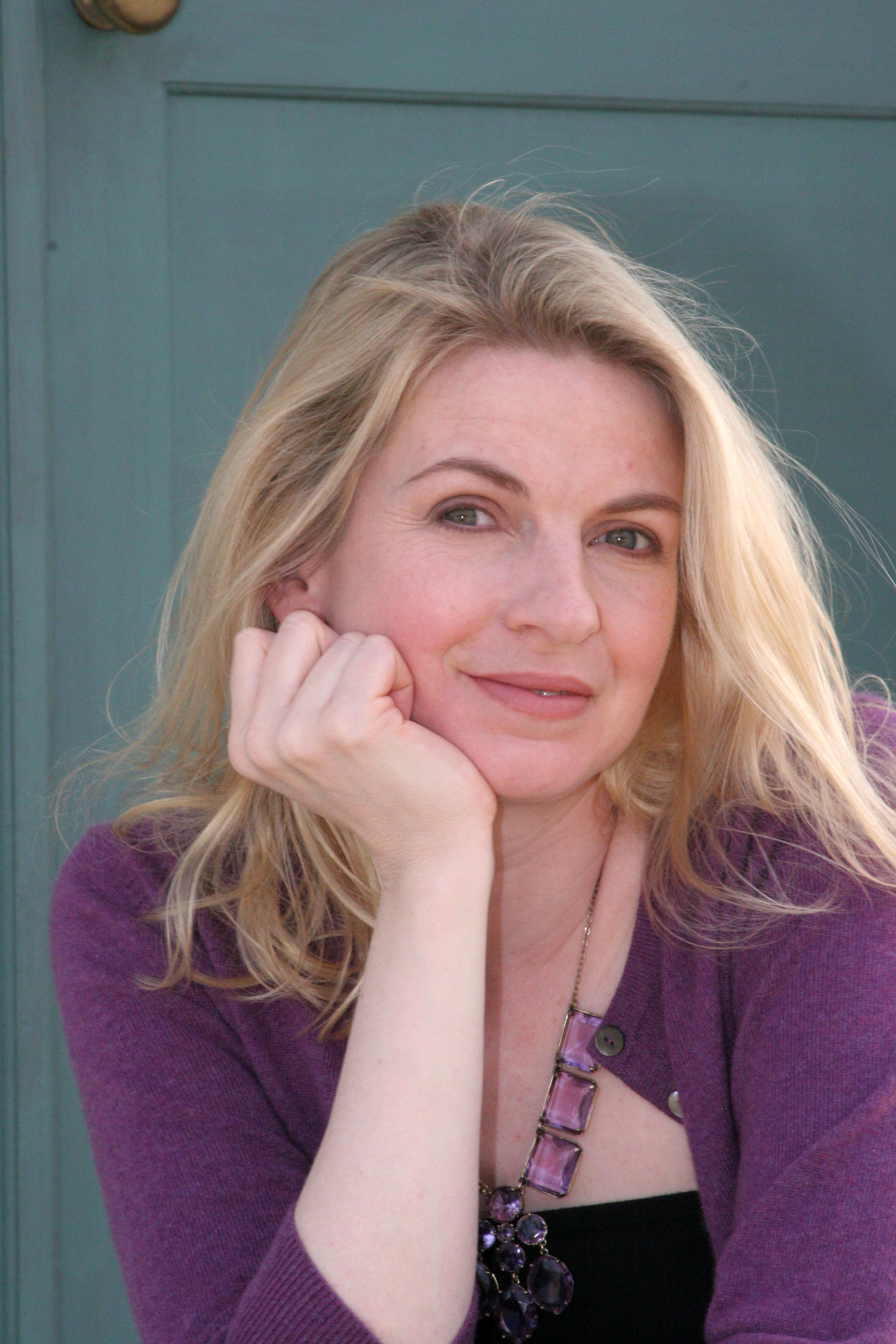
- Publicity photo for Revolution, 2010
- Born: August 16, 1963 (age 63); Port Chester, New York, U.S.
- Education: University of Rochester (B.A.)
- Occupation: Novelist
- Children: 1
- Writing career
- Period: 2002–present
- Genres: Historical fiction, young adult fiction
- Notable works: A Northern Light; Revolution; The Rose trilogy
- Notable awards: Carnegie Medal; 2003; LA Times Book Prize; 2003
- Website: jenniferdonnelly.com

Jennifer Donnelly (born August 16, 1963) is an American writer best known for the young adult historical novel A Northern Light.

A Northern Light was published as A Gathering Light in the U.K. (Note: Northern Lights (Scholastic UK, 1995) by Philip Pullman had been published in the U.S. as The Golden Compass (Knopf, 1996); thus, only one Northern Light(s) title was used on each continent. Both novels won the annual British Carnegie Medal (which opened before 2003 to American authors who co-publish in the U.K.), and both were named one of the top ten Medal-winning books for the 70th anniversary.) There, it won the 2003 Carnegie Medal, recognizing the year's outstanding children's book. For the 70th anniversary of the Medal a few years later, it was named one of the top ten winning works, selected by a panel to compose the ballot for a public election of the all-time favorite. Similarly, it was named one of Time Magazine's 100 Best Young Adult Books of All Time in 2015.

== Early life ==
Donnelly was born in Port Chester, New York. Her paternal great-grandparents immigrated from Dublin, Ireland to New York state and settled in the Adirondack region where her grandmother worked at a hotel on Big Moose Lake, the setting for A Northern Light. Donnelly's own childhood was divided between the communities of Rye and Port Leyden, New York.

Donnelly attended the University of Rochester, where she earned a degree in English Literature in 1985. She also attended Birkbeck College, University of London, in England.

== Career ==
Donnelly returned to New York at age 25, moving to Brooklyn. Her first book was published by Atheneum in 2002: Humble Pie, a picture book with the veteran illustrator Stephen Gammell. That year she also published her first novel. The Tea Rose (Thomas Dunne, 2002) is the first book of a trilogy set in the East End of London late in the 19th century, with ties to the story of Jack the Ripper. The second book, The Winter Rose, continues the tale, following the Finnegan family and related characters from London to Africa to the coast of Northern California. The third novel in the series, The Wild Rose, which explores Willa and Seamie's story, follows the characters from London on the verge of World War I to Arabia in 1918.

Her second novel, A Northern Light, is based on the murder of Grace Brown by Chester Gillette in the Adirondack Mountains in 1906 - which had been the basis for Theodore Dreiser's epic An American Tragedy and its adaptation, the 1951 film A Place in the Sun.

In 2004, A Northern Light won the Carnegie Medal for children's and young-adult books published in Britain - where it was entitled A Gathering Light and may have been her first work published in the U.K. (Note: The Carnegie panel recommended A Gathering Light for ages 12 and up and selected it as one of six finalists in April 2004, when its press release called her "American first time novelist Jennifer Donnelly" ("Shortlist for the CILIP Carnegie Medal announced"). It may have been her first book published internationally. When she won the Medal three months later, CILIP wrote that "her first book 'Tea Rose' was published in Spring 2003" after it was "rejected by nearly every publishing house in New York" ("Background on Jennifer Donnelly and A Gathering Light").) In the U.S., it won the Los Angeles Times Book Prize for young-adult literature and was a runner-up for the Printz Award from the American Library Association (ALA), recognizing the year's best book for young adults. In 2015, Time Magazine named A Northern Light one of the best YA books of all time.

Her second young-adult novel, Revolution, is a tale of two teenage girls, one in present-day Brooklyn, and one in Paris during the French Revolution. The book was published in October, 2010 by Delacorte Press, an imprint of Random House, with a first run of 250,000 copies. The book was nominated for a Carnegie Medal, and appeared on a number of "best-of" lists, including Kirkus Reviews, School Library Journal, Amazon.com, BN.com, ALA-YALSA, among others. The audiobook edition from Listening Library, read by Emily Janice Card and Emma Bering, was a runner-up for the ALA's annual Odyssey Award. Donnelly was "captivated and amazed" by the rendition of what she calls "the hardest book I've written".

From 2014-2016, Disney published Donnelly's four-book Waterfire Saga (Deep Blue, Rogue Wave, Dark Tide and Sea Spell), which have won numerous awards including the Nature Generation's 2015 Green Earth Book Award. The song "Open Your Eyes", released by Hollywood Records and sung by Bea Miller, was drawn from the chant sung by the river witches in Deep Blue.

Donnelly worked with Disney again in 2017, when she published Beauty and the Beast: Lost in a Book, an original story to accompany the Beauty and the Beast film. Lost in a Book expands on the film, exploring the friendship between Belle and the Beast as well as Belle's time within the pages of Nevermore, a magical book from which she narrowly escapes. Lost in a Book spent four months on the New York Times bestseller list, and rights have been sold in 11 countries.

Donnelly returned to historical fiction with Fatal Throne, a book about Henry VIII and his six wives published by Random House/Schwartz & Wade in May 2018. For this project, Donnelly joined six other authors (Candace Fleming, M.T. Anderson, Stephanie Hemphill, Deborah Hopkinson, Linda Sue Park, and Lisa Ann Sandell), each of whom wrote the part of Henry or one of his wives. Donnelly wrote Anne of Cleves, Henry's fourth wife.

In September 2017, Donnelly announced a new multi-book project with Scholastic Publishing beginning with 2019's Stepsister. The story begins where the classic tale of Cinderella leaves off and follows her wicked stepsister Isabelle as "personifications of fate and chance battle for control of her life, hinting that there may be hope after all for a girl labeled ugly since her first appearances in literature". "Stepsister" was followed in 2020 by Poisoned, a retelling of the Snow White fairy tale. Donnelly has said a third fairy tale retelling is in the works and will be published in early 2024, but details are not yet available. Motion Picture rights for Stepsister and Poisoned have been acquired by Endeavor Content.

In 2023, she published Molly's Letter, the first in a series of novella-length stories called Rose Petals set in the world of her three-volume Tea Rose series.

== Personal life ==
Donnelly and her husband live in the Hudson Valley with their daughter.

== Awards and nominations ==
Donnelly won the Carnegie Medal and the Los Angeles Times Book Prize for A Northern Light. Both A Northern Light and Revolution won other awards or were runners-up (often called Honor Books in the U.S.) and both were named to several annual book lists:

A Northern Light (2003)

- Charlotte Award, New York State Reading Association
- Michael L. Printz Award Honor
- American Library Association-YALSA Top Ten Best Book For Young Adults
- ALA-Booklist Editors' Choice
- Booklist Top Ten Youth First Novel
- Book Sense 76 Top Ten Books for Teens
- Junior Library Guild Selection
- New York Public Library Book for the Teen Age
- Parent's Guide Children's Media Young Adult Honor Book
- Publishers Weekly Best Book of the Year
- School Library Journal Best Book of the Year
- Time Magazine Top 100 YA Books of All Time

Revolution (2010)

- New Atlantic Independent Booksellers Association Book of the Year
- ALA Odyssey Award for Excellence in Audiobook Production Honor
- American Booksellers Association Indies Choice Young Adult Book of the Year
- ALA-YALSA Top Ten Best Book For Young Adults
- ALA Amelia Bloomer Book
- Amazon.com Best Book of the Year
- Kirkus Reviews Best Book of the Year
- School Library Journal Best Book of the Year
- Bulletin Blue Ribbon Book
- Chicago Public Library Best of the Best Book
- Carnegie Medal nominee

Deep Blue (2015)

- Green Book Award

Fatal Throne (2018)

- American Library Association-YALSA 2019 Best Fiction for Young Adults

Stepsister (2019)

- American Library Association-YALSA 2020 Best Fiction for Young Adults
- American Library Association 2020 Amelia Bloomer Book List
- Seventeen Magazine - Best YA Books of 2019
- Bank Street College of Education 2020 Best Children's Books of the Year

Poisoned (2020)

- American Library Association-YALSA 2021 Best Fiction for Young Adults
- Bank Street College of Education 2021 Best Children's Books of the Year

== Works ==
- Humble Pie (Atheneum Books, 2002), illustrated by Stephen Gammell
- The Tea Rose (Thomas Dunne Books, 2002), a 500-page novel
- A Northern Light (Harcourt, 2003)
- The Winter Rose (Hyperion Books, 2008), sequel to The Tea Rose
- Revolution (Penguin Random House/Delacorte Press, 2010)
- The Wild Rose (Hyperion, 2011), completing The Tea Rose series
- Deep Blue (Disney Publishing Worldwide, 2014), Waterfire Saga
- Rogue Wave (Disney Publishing Worldwide, 2015), Waterfire Saga
- Dark Tide (Disney Publishing Worldwide, 2015), Waterfire Saga
- These Shallow Graves (Penguin Random House/Delacorte Press, 2015)
- Sea Spell (Disney Publishing Worldwide, 2016) Waterfire Saga
- Lost in a Book (Disney Publishing Worldwide, 2017) Beauty and the Beast
- Fatal Throne (Anna of Cleves Chapter) (Penguin Random House/Schwartz & Wade, 2018)
- Stepsister (Scholastic, 2019)
- Poisoned (Scholastic, 2020)
