= Michelle Knudsen =

American writer

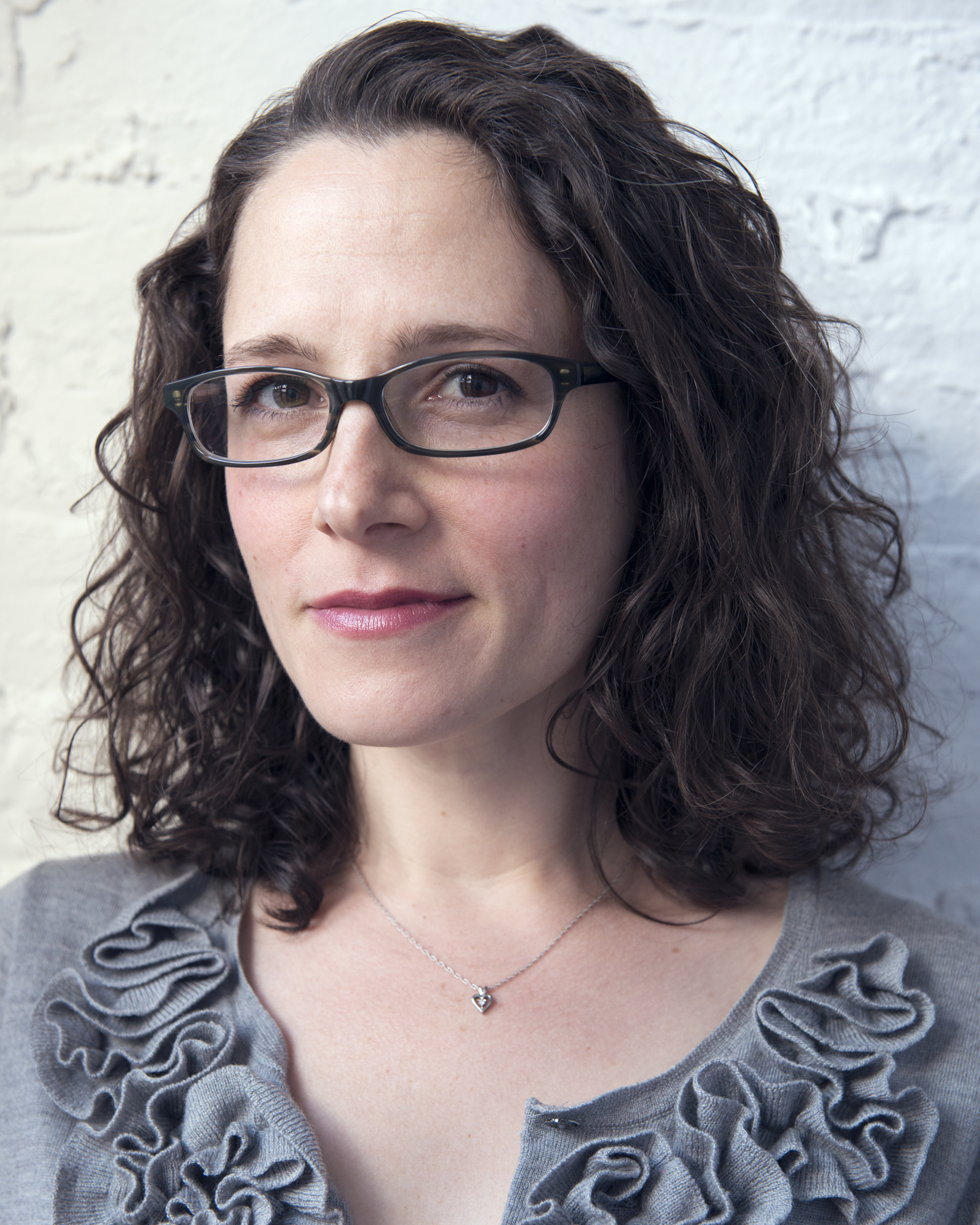
- Knudsen in May 2015
- Education: Cornell University; Vermont College of Fine Arts (MFA)
- Occupation: Author
- Writing career
- Genre: Children's literature
- Website: www.michelleknudsen.com

Michelle Knudsen is a New York Times best-selling American children's author. She has written more than 50 books for children, including the multiple-award-winning Library Lion, the Trelian middle grade fantasy trilogy, and the Evil Librarian young adult horror/comedy/romance trilogy.

Knudsen graduated from Cornell University and received an MFA in Writing for Children and Young Adults from the Vermont College of Fine Arts. She currently teaches in the University of San Francisco's MFA program in Writing for Young Readers.

== Biography ==
Knudsen is a New York Times best-selling author of more than 50 books for young readers, including board books, picture books, early readers, and middle grade and young adult novels. She is the author of the award-winning picture book Library Lion, which has been translated into twenty languages, is being performed as a musical stage production in Boston, and was selected by Time Magazine as one of the 100 Best Children's Books of All Time. She is also the author of the middle grade fantasy novel Into the Wild Magic (winner of the 2025 Andre Norton Nebula Award for Middle Grade and Young Adult Fiction); the Trelian trilogy of fantasy novels (The Dragon of Trelian, The Princess of Trelian, and The Mage of Trelian); and the Evil Librarian trilogy of young adult novels, the first of which was awarded the 2015 Sid Fleischman Award for Humor and has been adapted into a musical for the stage by Landless Theatre Company. Knudsen also works as a freelance editor and writing teacher, and is a member of the MFA in Writing for Young Readers faculty at the University of San Francisco. She lives in Brooklyn, New York City.

== Bibliography ==
=== Young adult novels ===
- Evil Librarian (2014)
- Revenge of the Evil Librarian (2017)
- Curse of the Evil Librarian (2019)
- Cursed Princess Club: A Most Unusual Princess (2025)
- Cursed Princess Club: Mirror, Mirror (2026)

=== Middle grade novels ===
- The Dragon of Trelian (2009)
- The Princess of Trelian (2012)
- The Mage of Trelian (2016)
- Into the Wild Magic (2025)

=== Chapter books ===
- She Persisted: Nellie Bly (2021)

=== Trade picture books ===
- Library Lion, illustrated by Kevin Hawkes (2006)
- Argus, illustrated by Andréa Wesson (2011)
- Big Mean Mike, illustrated by Scott Magoon (2012)
- Marilyn's Monster, illustrated by Matt Phelan (2015)
- Luigi, the Spider Who Wanted to Be a Kitten, illustrated by Kevin Hawkes (2024)

=== Short stories ===
- "The Bridge to Highlandsville" in the MG anthology I Fooled You (2010)
- "From the Notebook of Gregorey, Keeper of Village Elders Meeting Minutes" in Underland Arcana (2023)
- "he Pigeon" in The Drabblecast (2023)
- "Biter" in Adventitious (2026)

=== Board books and novelty ===
- Noah's Ark (1999)
- Valentine's Day (2001)
- Love (2001)
- Happy Halloween (2001)
- Merry Christmas (2001)
- Easter Basket (2002)
- Easter Egg (2002)
- Happy Easter! (2003)
- Princess Party (2003)
- Fairy Friends (2003)
- Mother's Day Ribbons (2005)
- Hearts and Kisses (2006)
- Easter Fun (2006)

=== Mass market picture books ===
- Angel Babies
- Old MacDonald's Farm
- Autumn Is for Apples (2001)
- Winter Is for Snowflakes (2003)

=== Coloring and activity books ===
- Godzilla: Monster Coloring Fun! (1998)
- Godzilla: Adventures to Color! (1998)
- Godzilla: Monster Coloring, Puzzles, and Codes! (1998)
- Godzilla: Monster Coloring, Mazes, and Games! (1998)
- Star Wars Episode I: Heroes and Villains Coloring Book (1999)
- Star Wars Episode I: Anakin's Adventures to Color (1999)
- Star Wars Episode I: Jar Jar's Coloring Fun (1999)
- Star Wars Episode I: Galactic Puzzles and Games (1999)
- Star Wars Episode I: Jedi Missions to Color (1999)
- Star Wars Episode I: Droids, Creatures, and Vehicles Coloring Book (1999)

== Awards ==
- Andre Norton Nebula Award for Middle Grade and Young Adult Fiction - Into the Wild Magic
