= Vu Tran =

Vietnamese American writer (born 1975)

Vu Hoang Tran
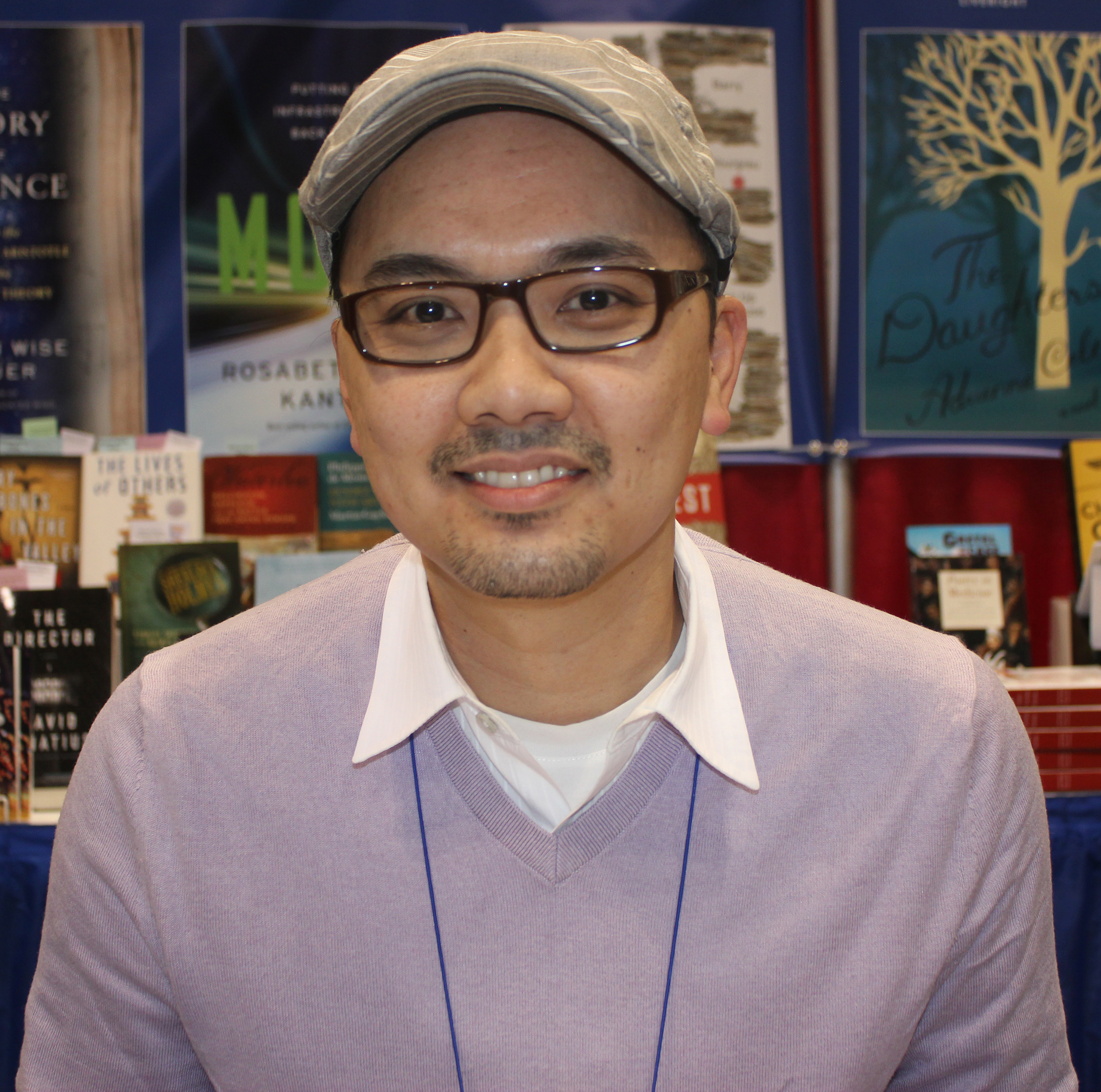
- Born: September 17, 1975 (age 50); Saigon, Vietnam
- Occupation: Writer
- Writing career
- Genre: Literary fiction
- Notable work: Dragonfish (2015)
- Website: www.vutranwriter.com

Vu Hoang Tran (born 1975; Vietnamese name: Trần, Hoàng Vũ) is a Vietnamese American novelist and short story writer. His debut novel, Dragonfish, was published in 2015.

== Life ==
Vu Hoang Tran was born in 1975 in Saigon, Vietnam. In 1980, he and his family fled the country by boat and ended up in the refugee camps in Pulau Bidong, off the coast of Malaysia, for four months. They settled in Tulsa, Oklahoma, where Tran grew up.

He graduated from the University of Tulsa with a BA and MA in English, received his MFA in fiction at the Iowa Writers' Workshop, and then finished his PhD in English and creative writing at the Black Mountain Institute at the University of Nevada, Las Vegas, where he was a Glenn Schaeffer Fellow in Fiction. Since 2010, he has been teaching literature and fiction writing at the University of Chicago, where he directs the undergraduate program in creative writing.

== Awards ==
- 2003 Short-Story Award for New Writers, Glimmer Train Stories
- 2004 Lawrence Foundation Prize, Michigan Quarterly Review
- 2009 Whiting Writers' Award
- 2011 Finalist Award, Vilcek Prize for Creative Promise in Literature
- 2015 New York Times Notable Books
- 2018 National Endowment for the Arts, Creative Writing Fellow

== Bibliography ==
=== Novels ===
- Dragonfish (W. W. Norton & Co., 2015)

=== Other publications ===
- "Monsoon", Glimmer Train Stories, Winter 2003
- "A Painted Face", The Southern Review, Winter 2005
- "The Gift of Years", Fence ; The O. Henry Prize Stories, 2007
- "This or Any Desert", The Best American Mystery Stories, 2009
- "War and Peace and Nostalgia", Virginia Quarterly Review, Fall 2018
- "A Refugee Again", The Displaced: Refugee Writers on Refugee Lives, 2018
- "Under the Murakami Spell", Virginia Quarterly Review, Spring 2019
- "Origins", Ploughshares, Summer 2019
- "Like Evening", McSweeney's 78: The Make Believers, Spring 2025
- "On White-Passing and Cuttlefish", McSweeney's 78: The Make Believers, Spring 2025
