= Dragonfish (novel) =

2015 novel by Vu Tran

- First edition
- Author: Vu Tran
- Language: English
- Genre: Fiction, thriller
- Published: 2015
- Publisher: W. W. Norton & Company
- Publication place: United States
- Pages: 298 pp

Dragonfish is the 2015 debut novel by writer Vu Tran. Dragonfish was #3 on the list of most checked out e-books in the year 2017 at the San Francisco Public Library.

== Plot ==
Suzy, a mysterious Vietnamese woman, leaves her police officer husband, Robert, and her home in Oakland, California. She reappears in Las Vegas with a new husband, Sonny, a violent Vietnamese gambler and smuggler. When Suzy vanishes again, Sonny blackmails Robert into finding her and the search leads them through the glitz and sleaze of Las Vegas's underbelly.
