= Doreen Cronin =

American writer of children's books

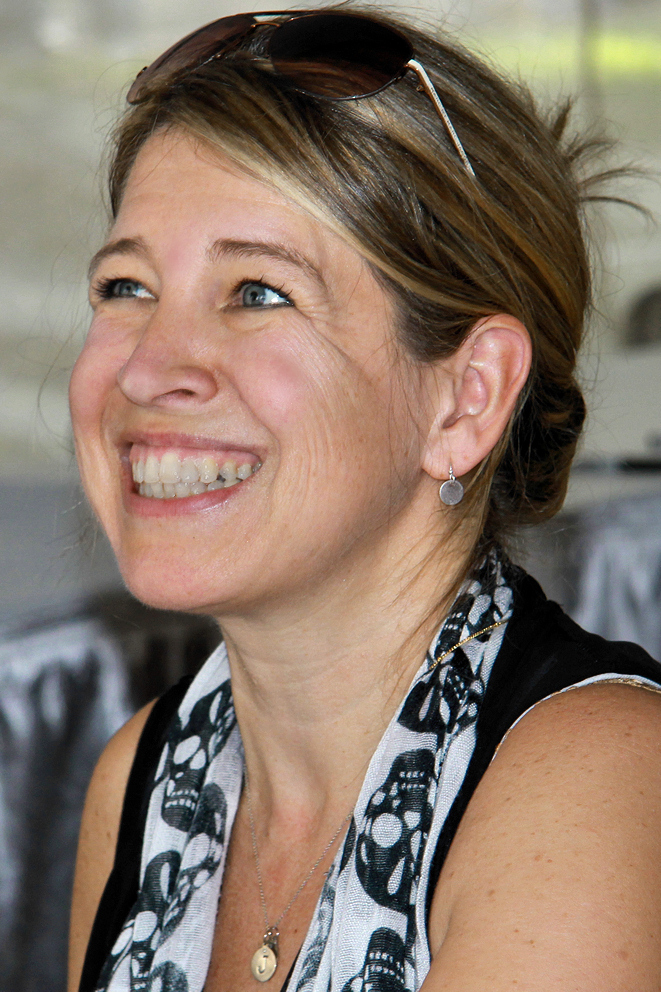
- Cronin in 2013
- Born: Doreen Cronin; 1966 (age 59–60); Queens, New York City, U.S.
- Education: Pratt Institute
- Occupation: Writer
- Children: 2
- Writing career
- Language: English
- Genre: Children's literature
- Website: doreencronin.com

Doreen Cronin (born 1966) is an American writer of children's books, including Click Clack Moo: Cows That Type, a picture book illustrated by Betsy Lewin.

== Life ==
Cronin was born in Queens, New York City, and grew up on Long Island. Cronin's first book was published by Simon & Schuster in 2000: Click, Clack, Moo: Cows That Type, a picture book that she wrote and Betsy Lewin illustrated. Illustrator Lewin was a runner-up for the annual Caldecott Medal.

Cronin lives in Brooklyn as of 2025 with her two children.

== Awards and honors ==
Ten of Cronin's books are Junior Library Guild selections: Click Clack Moo: Cows That Type (2000), Diary of a Worm (2004), Diary of a Spider (2005), Diary of a Fly (2007), Smick! (2015), Click, Clack, Quack to School (2018), Click, Clack, Peep! (2019), Click, Clack, Surprise! (2019), Click, Clack Rainy Day (2022), Mama in the Moon (2024)

In 2015, The Chicken Squad was named one of the best books of the year by Bank Street College of Education. In 2016, Click, Clack, Peep! was named one of the best books of the year by Bank Street College of Education.

Smick was named one of the best picture books of the year by Booklist (2015) and Bank Street College of Education (2016), where it received "Outstanding Merit."

Awards for Cronin's writing
Year	Title	Award	Result	Ref.
2001	Click, Clack, Moo: Cows that Type,	Caldecott Medal	Honor	
2004	Giggle, Giggle, Quack	Carnegie Medal for Excellence in Children's Video	Winner	
2005	Diary of a Worm	ALSC Notable Children's Videos	Selection	
2005	Duck for President	ALSC Notable Children's Videos	Selection	
2007	Diary of a Spider	ALSC Notable Children's Videos	Selection	
2008	Dooby Dooby Moo	Odyssey Award	Honor	
2011	The Trouble with Chickens	Cybils Award for Early Chapter Book	Finalist	
2014	The Chicken Squad: The First Misadventure	Cybils Award for Early Chapter Book	Finalist	
2017	Bloom	Amelia Bloomer List	Selection	

== Publications ==
- Click, Clack, Moo: cows that type (Simon & Schuster, 2000), illustrated by Betsy Lewin
- Giggle, Giggle, Quack (S&S, 2002), ill. Lewin
- Diary of a Worm (Joanna Cotler Books, 2003), ill. Harry Bliss
- Duck For President (S&S, 2004), ill. Lewin
- Diary of a Spider (2005), ill. Bliss
- Wiggle (2005), ill. Scott Menchin
- Click, Clack, Quackity-Quack: an alphabetical adventure (2005), ill. Lewin
- Click, Clack, Splish, Splash: a counting adventure (2006), ill. Lewin
- Dooby Dooby Moo (Atheneum Books, S&S, 2006), ill. Lewin – sequel to Click, Clack, Moo
- Bounce (2007), ill. Menchin
- Diary of a Fly (2007), ill. Bliss
- Thump, Quack, Moo: a whacky adventure (2008), ill. Lewin
- Busy Day at the Farm (2009), ill. Lewin
- Stretch (2009), ill. Menchin
- Rescue Bunnies (2010), ill. Menchin
- M.O.M. (Mom Operating Manual) (Atheneum, 2011), ill. Laura Cornell

—54 pages; ages 4–8; "A guide to the care and maintenance of mothers, who are, according to the manual, "the most advanced human models on the planet."

- Trouble with Chickens: a J.J. Tully mystery (Balzer & Bray, 2011), ill. Kevin Cornell

—119 pages; interest level ages 8–12; mystery featuring "a hard-bitten former search-and-rescue dog"

- Legend of Diamond Lil: a J.J. Tully mystery (2012), ill. K. Cornell
- Click, clack, boo!: a tricky treat (2013), ill. Lewin
- Boom, Snot, Twitty (Penguin Group, 2014), ill. Renata Liwska
- Nat the Gnat (2014), ill. Bliss
- Chicken Squad Case #1: Full House (Atheneum, 2014), ill. K. Cornell
- Click, Clack, Peep (2015), ill. Lewin
- Cyclone (2017)
- Lawrence and Sophia (Rocky Pond Books, 2023) ill. Brian Cronin
- Mama in the Moon (Rocky Pond Books, 2024) ill. Brian Cronin
- Lawrence and Sophia, Big and Bold (Rocky Pond Books, 2025) ill. Brian Cronin
