= Betsy Lewin =

American children's illustrator and writer (born 1937)

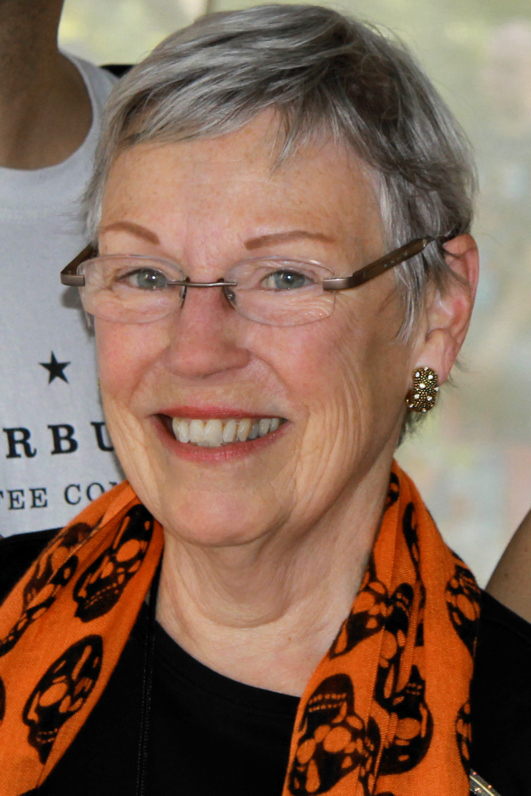
- Lewin at the 2013 Texas Book Festival
- Born: May 12, 1937 (age 89); Clearfield, Pennsylvania, U.S.
- Education: Pratt Institute
- Occupations: Illustrator, writer
- Spouse: Ted Lewin
- Writing career
- Genres: Children's picture books, travel
- Website: betsylewin.com

Betsy Reilly Lewin (born May 12, 1937) is an American illustrator from Clearfield, Pennsylvania. She studied illustration at Pratt Institute. After graduation, she began designing greeting cards. She began writing and illustrating stories for children's magazines and eventually children's books. She is married to children's book illustrator Ted Lewin and with him has co-written and illustrated several books about their travels to remote places, including Uganda in Gorilla Walk and Mongolia in Horse Song, as well as How to Babysit a Leopard: and Other True Stories from Our Travels Across Six Continents (Roaring Brook Press, 2015). She is arguably best known for the Caldecott Honor Book Click Clack Moo: Cows that Type.

== Books illustrated ==
- Thump, Quack, Moo: A Wacky Adventure by Doreen Cronin Atheneum Books, 2008, ISBN 978-1-4169-1630-7
- Horse Song: The Naadam of Mongolia by Ted Lewin and Betsy Lewin, Lee & Low Books, 2008, ISBN 978-1-58430-277-3
- Heat Wave by Eileen Spinelli, Harcourt Children's Books, 2007, ISBN 978-0-15-216779-0
- Dooby, Dooby, Moo by Doreen Cronin, Atheneum Books, 2006, ISBN 978-0-618-43477-0 and ISBN 0-618-43477-1
- Click Clack, Quackity-Quack by Doreen Cronin, Atheneum Books, 2005, ISBN 978-0-689-87715-5
- Click, Clack, Splish, Splash by Doreen Cronin, Atheneum Books, 2005, ISBN 978-0-689-87716-2
- Duck For President by Doreen Cronin, Simon & Schuster, 2004, ISBN 0-689-86377-2
- Animal Snackers by Betsy Lewin, Henry Holt, 2004, ISBN 0-8050-6748-5
- The Sleepover by Grace Maccarone, Scholastic, 2003, ISBN 0-439-38575-X
- Cat Count by Betsy Lewin, Henry Holt, 2003, ISBN 0-8050-6747-7
- Two Eggs Please by Sarah Weeks, Simon & Schuster, 2003, ISBN 0-689-83196-X
- A Hug Goes Around by Laura Krauss Melmed, HarperCollins, 2003, ISBN 0-688-14680-5
- Giggle, Giggle, Quack by Doreen Cronin, Simon & Schuster, 2002, ISBN 0-689-84506-5
- Aunt Minnie and the Twister by Mary S. Prigger, Clarion Books, 2002, ISBN 0-618-11136-0
- Click, Clack, Moo: Cows That Type by Doreen Cronin, Simon & Schuster, 2000, ISBN 0-689-83213-3
- Aunt Minnie McGranahan by Mary S. Prigger, Clarion Books, 1999, ISBN 0-395-82270-X
- No Such Thing by Jackie French Koller, Boyds Mills Press, 1996, ISBN 1-56397-490-8
- Somebody Catch My Homework by David Harrison, Boyds Mills Press, 1993, ISBN 1-878093-87-8
- Chubbo’s Pool by Betsy Lewin, Clarion Books, 1996, ISBN 0-395-72807-X
- What’s The Matter Habibi? by Betsy Lewin, Clarion Books, 1997, ISBN 0-395-85816-X
- Promises by Elizabeth Winthrop, Clarion Books, 2000, ISBN 0-395-82272-6
- Gorilla Walk by Ted and Betsy Lewin, (Lothrop) HarperCollins, 1999, ISBN 0-688-16509-5
- Elephant Quest by Ted and Betsy Lewin, HarperCollins, 2000, ISBN 0-688-14111-0
- Purrfectly Purrfect by Patricia Lauber, HarperCollins, 2000, ISBN 0-688-17299-7
- Araminta’s Paintbox by Karen Ackerman, Simon & Schuster, Aladdin paperback, 1990, ISBN 0-689-82091-7
- Booby Hatch by Betsy Lewin, Clarion paperback, 1995, ISBN 0-395-84516-5
- Yo Hungry Wolf! by David Vozar, B.D.Dell paperback, 1993, ISBN 0-440-40953-5
- Dumpy La Rue by Elizabeth Winthrop, Henry Holt, 2001, ISBN 0-8050-6385-4
- A Houseful of Christmas by Barbara Joosse, Henry Holt, 2001, ISBN 0-8050-6391-9
- Itchy, Itchy Chicken Pox by Grace Maccarone, Scholastic, ISBN 0-590-44948-6
- My Tooth is About to Fall Out by Grace Maccarone, Scholastic
- Gym Day Winner by Grace Maccarone, Scholastic, ISBN 0-606-09280-3
- Recess Mess by Grace Maccarone, Scholastic
- Lunchbox Surprise by Grace Maccarone, Scholastic
- I Have A Cold by Grace Maccarone, Scholastic, ISBN 0-590-39638-2
- Class Trip by Grace Maccarone, Scholastic, ISBN 0-439-06755-3
- Fraidy Cats by Stephen Krensky, Scholastic, ISBN 0-590-46438-8
- Groundhog Day by Betsy Lewin, Scholastic, ISBN 0-439-10802-0
- Is It Far to Zanzibar?: Poems About Tanzania by Nikki Grimes, HarperCollins, ISBN 0-688-13157-3
- Walk a Green Path by Betsy Lewin, HarperCollins, 1995
- What is the Shark Wears Tennis Shoes? by Winifred Morris, Atheneum Books, 1990
- Kitten in Trouble by M. Polushkin, Simon & Schuster Children's Publishing, 1988
- Furlie Cat by Berneice Frechet, 1986
- Hip, Hippo, Hooray by Betsy Lewin, 1982
- Penny by Beatrice Schenk de Regniers, Lothrop, Lee * Shepard Books, 1987

== Exhibitions ==
- Pratt Institute Libraries

Exhibition: "Around the World with Ted and Betsy Lewin" October 30 - December 2, 2008

- Society of Illustrators: main floor gallery

Exhibition: "Adventures With Ted and Betsy" June 1 through June 11, 2005

- Massachusetts Audubon Center, Canton, MA.

Exhibition: "NCCIL Traveling Show"Feb. 12 through May 1, 2005

- Brooklyn Public Library, New York

Exhibition: "Ted and Betsy Lewin's World of Picture Books" March 4–30, 2004

- Children's Museum of Manhattan, New York

Exhibition: "Travels with Ted and Betsy Lewin" Featured 78 original illustrations from many of their books.

- National Center for Children's Illustrated Literature (NCCIL)

Exhibition: "Adventures with Ted and Betsy", Abilene, TX, Watershouse, Germantown, MD, Wichita Falls, TX

- Society of Illustrators, Original Art 2001 Silver Medalist
- National Museum of Women in the Arts, Washington D.C.
- University of Southern Missouri
- Society of Illustrators, Women Illustrators of the Century
