= List of fictional dogs in prose and poetry =

This is a list of fictional dogs in prose and poetry and is a subsidiary to the list of fictional dogs. It is a collection of various dogs in prose literature and poetry.

== Prose and poetry ==
Name(s)	Breed(s)	Source	Author	Notes
Abraham	Akita	How to Stop Time	Matt Haig	Tom Hazard's dog
Argos		Odyssey	Homer	Faithful dog of Odysseus.
Baleia		Vidas Secas	Graciliano Ramos	Later adapted into the 1963 Brazilian classic Vidas Secas. The dog actress, Piaba, was celebrated at the Cannes Film Festival amidst controversy over the dog's (simulated) death scene.
Banga		The Master and Margarita	Mikhail Bulgakov	Pontius Pilate's dog.
Baree	Wolfdog	Baree, Son of Kazan	James Curwood	Son of Gray Wolf and Kazan.
Bendicò	Great Dane	Il Gattopardo (The Leopard)	Giuseppe Tomasi di Lampedusa	Belonging to the central character Don Fabrizio Corbera, Prince of Salina
Belle	Pyrenean Mountain Dog	Belle et Sébastien	Cécile Aubry	Lives with her owner Sebastian in village in the French Alps close to the frontier with Italy.
Big Red	Irish Setter	Big Red	Jim Kjelgaard	
Blood		A Boy and His Dog	Harlan Ellison	Later adapted into a film where Blood is voiced by Tim McIntire.
Blue		The Sound and the Fury	William Faulkner	
Bob	Fox Terrier	Dumb Witness	Agatha Christie	Also released as part of the Agatha Christie's Poirot series.
Bodger and Luath	Bull Terrier, Labrador Retriever	The Incredible Journey	Sheila Burnford	Based on a true story.
Buck	St. Bernard-Scotch Collie	The Call of the Wild	Jack London (Note: Buck in "Call of the wild" is described thus: "His (Buck's)father, Elmo, a huge St Bernard, had been the Judge's inseparable companion, and Buck bid fair to follow in the way of his father. He was not so large,—he weighed only one hundred and forty pounds,—for his mother, Shep, had been a Scotch shepherd dog. Nevertheless, one hundred and forty pounds, to which was added the dignity that comes of good living and universal respect, enabled him to carry himself in right royal fashion." The use of the term "Scotch shepherd dog" is a Victorian phrase which probably refers to Scotch Collie but might refer to English Shepherd. Three Leonberger 'actors' (one was a female, and two males) played the starring dog "Buck" in The Call of the Wild: Dog of the Yukon (1997), a Canadian rendition of Jack London's Call of the Wild starring Rutger Hauer as John Thornton (narrated by Richard Dreyfuss). "Leonberger Facts". American Kennel Club. Archived from the original on March 30, 2013.)	Adapted in five movies: A silent film (1923); (1935); 1972; The Call of the Wild: Dog of the Yukon (1997); and Call of the Wild 3D (2009).
Bugle Ann	Foxhound	The Voice of Bugle Ann	MacKinlay Kantor	Spring Davis' dog; about a farmer's love for his hunting dog and the feud it sparks in the county.
Buller		The Human Factor	Graham Greene	Protagonist Maurice Castle's dog
Bulls-eye		Oliver Twist	Charles Dickens	Bill Sikes' dog.
Buster	Scottish Terrier	Five Find-Outers	Enid Blyton	Belonging to Frederick Algernon Trotteville ("Fatty").
Cafall		Historia Brittonum	Nennius?	Dog belonging to King Arthur (occasionally spelled "Cabal" or "Caval").
Carl	Rottweiler	Good Dog, Carl	Alexandra Day	
Charkie	Cocker Spaniel	Curious George	H. A. Rey and Margret Rey	Steve and Betsy's dog, about a brown monkey who is brought from Africa to live in a big city.
Clifford	Vizsla	Clifford the Big Red Dog	Norman Bridwell	An enormous dog. He is friendly, outgoing and helpful, but his sheer size can sometimes cause trouble.
Crab		Two Gentlemen of Verona	William Shakespeare	"the sourest natured dog that lives".
Cujo	St. Bernard	Cujo	Stephen King	200-pound Saint Bernard who chases a wild rabbit into a small limestone cave where he contracts cryptic bat rabies and terrorizes Castle Rock, Maine, killing a few residents.
Daisy		A Ball for Daisy, Daisy Gets Lost	Chris Raschka	A small white dog who loves to play with her ball.
Dingo		Dick Sand, A Captain at Fifteen	Jules Verne	
Diogenes		Dombey and Son	Charles Dickens	Friend of Paul Dombey and later his sister Florence.
Disreputable Dog		Lirael and Abhorsen	Garth Nix	
Einstein	Golden Retriever	Watchers	Dean Koontz	
Eos		Funeral Games	Mary Renault	Beautiful white dog.
Fang	Mastiff	Harry Potter and the Sorcerer's Stone	J. K. Rowling	Hagrid's dog.
Fluffy	Cerberus	Harry Potter and the Sorcerer's Stone	J. K. Rowling	Guards the sorcerer's stone in the dungeons, just as Cerberus guards the underworld in Greek mythology. Inspired by the Greek myth of Orpheus and Eurydice. Orpheus reaches the underworld by putting Cerberus to sleep with a harp. Similarly, Harry Potter passes Fluffy by playing the flute in order to put Fluffy to sleep.
Flush	Cocker Spaniel	Flush: A Biography	Virginia Woolf	
Garm		Farmer Giles of Ham	J. R. R. Tolkien	
Garryowen		Ulysses	James Joyce	
Gaspode and Laddie		Discworld	Terry Pratchett	Unusually clever dog that talks and his Wonder Dog client.
Ginger		The View from Saturday	E. L. Konigsburg	Genius dog of Nadia Diamondstein.
Ginger Pye		Ginger Pye	Eleanor Estes	
Gnaish		Thunder Oak	Garry Kilworth	
Go Go Girl and Slinkster Dog		Weetzie Bat	Francesca Lia Block	
Gyp		Adam Bede	George Eliot	Adam Bede's dog.
Hank		Hank the Cowdog	John R. Erickson	
The Hound of the Baskervilles	Hound	Sherlock Holmes	Arthur Conan Doyle	Written with the famous line, "They were the footprints of a gigantic hound!"
Grip, Fang and Wolf		The Lord of the Rings	J.R.R. Tolkien	Dogs belonging to Farmer Maggot.
Huan	Wolfhound	The Silmarillion	J. R. R. Tolkien	Companion of Valinor, friend and helper of Beren and Lúthien.
Missis, Perdita, Pongo, and other Dalmatians	Dalmatian	The Hundred and One Dalmatians	Dodie Smith	Subsequently, made into a film by Walt Disney. Later also adapted as a live-action film and as a stage musical.
Jip	Lapdog	David Copperfield	Charles Dickens	Belonging to Dora Spenlow, David Copperfield's first wife.
Jip		Doctor Dolittle	Hugh Lofting	One of Doctor Dolittle's animal companions.
John Joiner		The Tale of Samuel Whiskers or The Roly-Poly Pudding	Beatrix Potter	Terrier who rescued Tom Kitten from being made into a pudding by rats.
Jumble	Mongrel	Just William	Richmal Crompton	William Brown's dog, first apprance in 1919.
Jump		Page (novel)	Tamora Pierce	
Kambyses		The Hound of Florence	Felix Salten	Every other day the protagonist Lukas Grassi is transformed into a dog, Kambyses, that belongs to the Archduke Ludwig.
Kashtanka		Kashtanka	Anton Chekhov	
Kazak	English Mastiff	The Sirens of Titan	Kurt Vonnegut, Jr.	Companion of William Niles Rumfoord. In another Vonnegut novel Breakfast of Champions, there is a Doberman Pinscher, also named Kazak.
Kipper		Kipper the Dog	Mick Inkpen	Warm-hearted, friendly and curious dog.
Know-Nothing Bozo the Non-Wonder Dog		So Long, and Thanks for All the Fish	Douglas Adams	Dog belonging to advertiser Will Smithers.
Lad	Rough Collie	Lad, A Dog	Albert Payson Terhune	
Laska		Anna Karenina	Leo Tolstoy	Levin's hunting dog.
Lassie	Rough Collie	Lassie Come Home	Eric Knight	
Lorelei		Lorelei's Secret	Carolyn Parkhurst	Dog who was the only witness to his owner's suicide. Her husband attempts to find out why she committed suicide by teaching the dog to communicate by talking. U.S. book title is The Dogs of Babel.
Martha		Martha Speaks	Susan Meddaugh	Main protagonist, Martha is a talking dog that was born an energetic stray and was put in the dog pound as a puppy.
Max	Mongrel	How the Grinch Stole Christmas!	Dr. Seuss	The Grinch's only companion in Mount Crumpit.
McKinley	Malamute	The Good Dog	Edward Irving Wortis	The protagonist who becomes leader of a dog pack.
Melampo		The Adventures of Pinocchio	Carlo Collodi	A deceased companion dog for a farmer.
Mo		'Mo: The Talking Dog'	Michelle Booth	Puppy who is given a specially-grown voicebox by a veterinarian and develops the ability to talk.
Molly		John Dies at the End	David Wong	Rust colored dog who eventually returns from an alternate universe as Fred Durst. In the second novel, Molly is shot dead, during an instant of time, in order to save Dave, who was saving Amy, who was running in front of an entire army as they were mowing down zombies.
Montmorency	Fox Terrier	Three Men in a Boat	Jerome K. Jerome	Narrator's dog who accompanies him and his two friends on a boating holiday over the river Thames.
Moses		Dogville	Lars von Trier	Chuck's dog, seen only as a chalk outline on the ground until the final scene.
Mouse		The Dresden Files	Jim Butcher	Harry's dog.
Mr. Bones		Timbuktu	Paul Auster	Stray dog and narrator of the story. Later renamed Sparky/Sparkatus
Mutt	Unknown	The Dog Who Wouldn't Be	Farley Mowat	Farley Mowat's dog in the book.
Nana	Newfoundland	Peter Pan	J. M. Barrie	
Nathaniel	Scottish Terrier	City	Clifford D. Simak	First of Bruce Webster's mutated dogs in this sci-fi novel in a world of dogs.
Old Dan and Little Ann	Redbone Coonhound	Where the Red Fern Grows	Wilson Rawls	
Old Yeller	Black Mouth Cur	Old Yeller	Fred Gipson	
Olive	Jack Russell Terrier	Olive, the Other Reindeer	Vivian Walsh and J. Otto Siebold	
One Eye	Mixed Breed	Spill Simmer Falter Wither	Sara Baume	
Pansy	Neapolitan Mastiff	Burke	Andrew Vachss	
Patapouf		Martine	Marcel Marlier and Gilbert Delahaye	
Patrasche		A Dog of Flanders	Ouida	
Pearl the Wonder Dog	Pointer	Spenser	Robert Parker	
Pepper	English Mastiff	The House on the Borderland	William Hope Hodgson	
Petitcrieu		Tristan and Iseult	Gottfried von Strassburg	A magical dog from Avalon of Arthurian legend
Petula	Pug	Molly Moon	Georgia Byng	
Pierre	Miniature Poodle	The Prairie Dogs	Glenda Goertzen	
Pilot		Jane Eyre	Charlotte Brontë	Mr. Rochester's dog
Poky		The Poky Little Puppy	Janette Sebring Lowry	
Pippin		Pippin and Mabel	K.V. Johansen	
Pompey		The History of Pompey the Little	Francis Coventry	Also known as The Life and Adventures of a Lap-dog.
Ponch		So You Want to Be a Wizard	Diane Duane	
Popper		The Goldfinch	Donna Tartt	Dog originally belongs to Xandra, taken by Theodore Decker. Often called Popchik or Popcyk.
Prince Terrien		Bridge to Terabithia	Katherine Paterson	Leslie Burke's (and the Burke parents') dog.
Pugnax		Against the Day	Thomas Pynchon	Literate mutt that is the associate of the Chums of Chance.
Rab		Rab and his Friends	John Brown	
Renni	German Shepherd	Renni the Rescuer	Felix Salten	a military working dog
Ribsy		Ribsy	Beverly Cleary	Companion of Henry Huggins.
Robinson Crusoe's dog		Robinson Crusoe	Daniel Defoe	While unnamed in the original, the dog is given a name in some remakes of the novel. Examples include "Tenn" in the 1967 novel Vendredi ou les Limbes du Pacifique and "Aynsley" in the 2016 film The Wild Life.
Rollo		Effi Briest	Theodor Fontane	Protagonist Effi Briest's dog
Rowf and Snitter	Mongrel, Fox Terrier	The Plague Dogs	Richard Adams	
Scamper	Golden Spaniel	The Secret Seven	Enid Blyton	Belonging to Peter and Janet.
Scout/Snuf	German Shepherd	Scout	Piet Prins	Originally written in Dutch
Searchlight		Stone Fox	John Reynolds Gardiner	Heroic sled-dog that pulled Little Willy's sled.
Shadow	Border Collie	The Sorcerer in the North	John Flanagan	Injured dog Will adopts. Taught many tricks, including barking on command, to aid Will's disguise as a jongleur.
Sharik, later changed to Poligraf Poligrafovich Sharikov	Mongrel	Heart of a Dog	Mikhail Bulgakov	Anti-hero of the novel, a stray transformed into a New Soviet Man, then back again
Shiloh	Beagle	Shiloh	Phyllis Reynolds Naylor	Dog saved from his abusive owner.
Sirius		Sirius	Olaf Stapleton	Eponymous hero, the result of an experiment to produce a dog with something like human intelligence.
Snuff		A Night in the Lonesome October	Roger Zelazny	Jack the Ripper's companion, and the narrator of the novel.
Sorry-oo		Moomins	Tove Jansson	
Spark		Little, Big	John Crowley	Daily Alice's dog
Spot		Spot the Dog	Eric Hill	
Sweetie		Diary of a Wimpy Kid: Dog Days	Jeff Kinney	A dog adopted by the Heffley Family. Frank got the dog to satisfy Greg's wanting of a dog and his feelings over the loss of his pet fish. He (Frank) later gives the dog to the Heffleys' maternal grandmother at the end of the book.
Timothy / Timmy / Tim	Mongrel	The Famous Five	Enid Blyton	All three names are found interchangeably. George Kirrin's dog.
Toto	Cairn Terrier	The Wonderful Wizard of Oz	L. Frank Baum	Dorothy's pet dog
Tock		The Phantom Tollbooth	Norton Juster	"Watchdog" (the name is a pun, because the dog has a large clock on his side)
Walter		Walter the Farting Dog	William Kotzwinkle and Glenn Murray	
What-a-Mess{Muir, Frank "What-a-Mess in Summer". Picture Corgi, 1982}	Afghan Hound	What-a-Mess	Frank Muir	Proper name Prince Amir of Kinjan but known as What-a Mess
White Fang and Kiche		White Fang	Jack London	
Wellington	Poodle	The Curious Incident of the Dog in the Night-Time	Mark Haddon	Mrs Shears's dog, found dead at the beginning of the story.
Wiggins		The Little White Horse	Elizabeth Goudge	Heroine Maria's dog.
Bluebell, Jessie, and Pincher		Animal Farm	George Orwell	Raised by Napolean of the Animal Farm.
