= The Dot and Line =

- Founder: Eric Vilas-Boas; John Maher III
- Country: United States of America
- Language: English
- Website: dotandline.net

The Dot and Line was an online publication focusing on animation journalism. It was founded in 2016 by John Maher III and Eric Vilas-Boas. Over the course of four years, the masthead grew to include Elly Belle, Sammy Nickalls, and Marley Crusch. The Dot and Line published both reported and creative writing about cartoons and animation. It ceased publication on May 1, 2020.

== History ==
The Dot and Line published its first piece on February 17, 2016, on Medium. The site took its name from the 1965 short of the same name, The Dot and the Line: A Romance in Lower Mathematics, directed by American animated filmmaker and cartoonist Chuck Jones, with Maurice Noble, for the MGM Animation/Visual Arts studio, and adapted from the book of the same name by Norton Juster. It began as a weekly blog run solely by Maher and Vilas-Boas with a mission of “covering the animated arts with journalism as serious, attentive, and engrossing as the best writing on works in other creative forms.”

Over the course of the next two years, the site expanded, publishing the work of dozens of volunteer contributors and ramping up its publication schedule to multiple times a week. In December 2017, Belle joined the publication as social media strategist and a contributing writer. In September 2018, Nickalls and Crusch joined the site as web editor and director of special projects, respectively; both were prior contributors, and Nickalls had previously guest-edited an editorial package for the site that July.

In April 2019, Belle was named newsletter editor, and The Dot and Line launched its newsletter. As of May 2020, according to its founders, the site had garnered roughly 1 million unique page views and 1.5 million total page views.

== Content ==
The Dot and Line published a variety of pieces including analyses, essays, interviews, humor, retrospectives, reviews, and works of creative writing, including fiction and poetry. The site was also responsible for the creation of two podcasts, four print zines, and a handful of editorial series. Notable editorial packages included "Space Cowboy Serenade," a month-long retrospective for the 20th anniversary of Cowboy Bebop in 2018; "A Horse with a Name," a week dedicated to BoJack Horseman in 2017; and the site's finale, "That's All, Folks!," in 2020. The site covered both current and historical animation, and published exclusive interviews with animators, voice actors, directors, producers, writers, historians, and others.

Examples:

- Charlie Adler, voice actor and director known for his work on Cow and Chicken and Tiny Toon Adventures
- Juan Antín, director of Pachamama
- Greg Baldwin, voice of Aku in Samurai Jack
- Steve Blum, voice of Spike Spiegel in Cowboy Bebop
- Johnny Yong Bosch, voice of Vash the Stampede in Trigun
- Steve Conte, singer on multiple Yoko Kanno soundtracks
- Jason DeMarco, co-creator of Toonami
- Dorothy Elias-Fahn, voice of Meryl Stryfe in Trigun
- Stephen Fossati, the "last protégé" of Chuck Jones, who spoke about the legendary animator's work on the short What's Opera, Doc?
- Wendee Lee, voice of Faye Valentine in Cowboy Bebop
- Hal Lublin, voice of Wide Wade in The Venture Bros
- Patrick McHale, animator on Adventure Time and Over the Garden Wall
- Adam Muto, Adventure Time showrunner
- Natalie Palamides, voice of Buttercup in The Powerpuff Girls
- Rob Paulsen, voice of Raphael in Teenage Mutant Ninja Turtles and Yakko from Animaniacs, among others
- Chris Prynoski, founder of Titmouse, Inc.
- Benjamin Renner, animator on Big Bad Fox
- Fred Seibert, founder of Frederator Studios
- Ali Soozandeh, animator of Tehran Taboo
- Genndy Tartakovsky, animator and director known for Dexter's Laboratory and Primal
- Nora Twomey, director of The Breadwinner
- Neil deGrasse Tyson, voice of Waddles in Gravity Falls
- Alberto Vásquez, director of Birdboy: The Forgotten Children
- Brandon Vietti, director of Young Justice and Scooby Doo! and WWE: Curse of the Speed Demon

The site also occasionally broke industry news, including the retirements of voice director Andrea Romano in 2017, and Adult Swim executive Mike Lazzo, in 2020.

== Legacy ==
The Dot and Line, which was an all-volunteer operation, became an incubator for work by amateur and emerging journalists covering animation and cartoons. A number of its contributors went on to publish work for outlets including Bitch, Esquire, /Film, Polygon, Thrillist, Vice Media, The New York Times and others.
