= Book of Love =

Book of Love may refer to:

== Music ==
- "The Book of Love" (The Monotones song), 1958
- "Book of Love", a song by Fleetwood Mac from the 1982 album Mirage
- Book of Love (band), an American synth-pop band
  - Book of Love (album), the band's 1987 album, and the title track
- The Book of Love (album), by Air Supply, 1997
- "Book of Love", a song by Toya featuring Loon from the 2001 self-titled album, Toya
- "Book of Love", a 2015 song by Felix Jaehn
- "The Book of Love", a song originally performed and recorded by The Magnetic Fields in 1999, and later covered by many artists including Peter Gabriel, Gavin James, Tracey Thorn, and Olivia Rodrigo

== Books ==
- Inbam (Kural book), one of the books of the Tirukkural
- The Book of Love, a 1934 novel by Upton Sinclair
- Book of Love (originally titled Jack in the Box), a 1980 novel by William Kotzwinkle
- The Book of Love, a novel by Kathleen McGowan
- The Book of Love, a 2024 novel by Kelly Link

== Film ==
- Book of Love (1990 film), directed by Robert Shaye based on William Kotzwinkle's book
- Book of Love (2002 film), directed by Jeffrey W. Byrd
- Book of Love (2004 film), directed by Alan Brown
- American Pie Presents: The Book of Love, 2009 film
- The Book of Love (2016 film), directed by Bill Purple
- Finding Mr. Right 2 (also known as Book of Love), a 2016 Chinese-Hong Kong film directed by Xue Xiaolu
- Book of Love (2022 film), directed by Analeine Cal y Mayor
