= The Bear Went Over the Mountain (novel) =

1996 novel by William Kotzwinkle

- Language: English
- Published: 1996
- Publisher: Doubleday
- Publication place: United States
- Pages: 306
- ISBN: 0385484283
- OCLC: 1315026231

The Bear Went Over the Mountain is a 1996 novel by American author William Kotzwinkle. The movie rights for the book were optioned to the Jim Henson Company.

== Synopsis ==
Arthur Bramhall isolates himself in a forest cabin to write a novel. Once it is complete, he goes off to buy champagne in celebration, after first burying the manuscript to protect it from fire. In his absence, a bear digs up the manuscript. The bear reads the work, decides it is good, and brings it to New York City, where he is accepted as a talented author and desirable party guest.

== Reception ==
The book was nominated for the 1997 World Fantasy Award.
