= This Is Not My Hat =

2012 children's picture book by Jon Klassen

- front cover of unknown edition with the Caldecott Medal
- Author: Jon Klassen
- Illustrator: Jon Klassen
- Cover artist: Jon Klassen
- Language: English
- Genre: Children's book
- Publisher: Candlewick Press
- Publication date: 2012
- Publication place: United States
- Media type: Print (hardback & paperback)
- Pages: 40 pp
- ISBN: 9780763655990
- OCLC: 779856963

This Is Not My Hat is a 2012 children's picture book by the author and illustrator Jon Klassen. The story is told through the unreliable narration of a little fish, who has stolen a hat from a big fish and how the big fish reacts to the theft. It is a thematic follow-up to I Want My Hat Back (2011) and was meant to be a more literal sequel until Klassen took a suggestion to change which animals were in the story. The book was well received by critics, who praised its dark or ironic humor which could only be understood by comparing the words of the little fish's narration against the events of the illustrations. In addition to several positive reviews, Klassen received the 2013 Caldecott Medal and the 2014 Kate Greenaway Medal, making This Is Not My Hat the first book to win both awards. This Is Not My Hat was also a commercial success.

== Background and publication ==
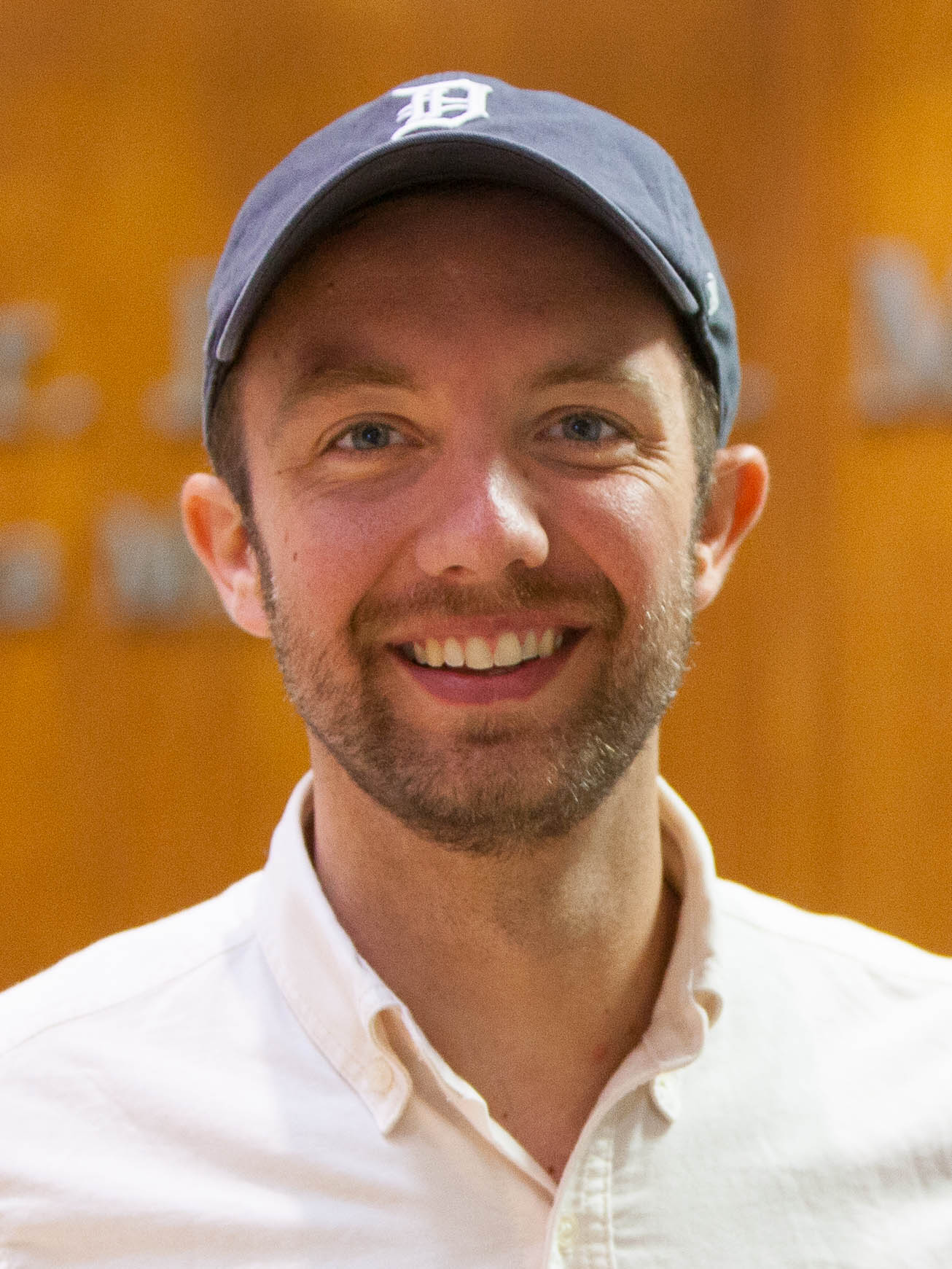
Klassen in 2013

Following the success of I Want My Hat Back, Klassen attempted unsuccessfully to tell more stories with the same characters, until the art director at his publisher, Candlewick Press, suggested he try new characters instead. Klassen then switched from mammals to fish. Klassen also felt that this story was more "dramatic" than his earlier work and cited "The Tell-Tale Heart" as a thematic inspiration. For this book he sketched the illustrations in ink before digitizing them and finishing the colors and details electronically.

The book was published on October 9, 2012, and was translated into more than 22 languages. Klassen toured 15 cities in the United States to promote the book. In 2014 an audiobook narrated by John Keating and accompanied by string instruments to represent the actions of the fish, in a way similar to the orchestration of Peter and the Wolf, was released by Weston Woods Studios, Inc.

In October 2019, the book's publisher, Candlewick Press, released a boxed set featuring This Is Not My Hat along with its two companion books (I Want My Hat Back and We Found a Hat), calling it Jon Klassen's Hat Box.

== Plot ==
A small fish has stolen a hat from a big sleeping fish. He boasts about how easy it will be for him to get away with the theft, because the big fish will not wake up any time soon and maybe not even notice the missing hat, or know who stole it, or where the small fish is going. However, the big fish does wake up and does notice. The little fish goes to hide in some plants, and is observed by a crab. The crab tells the big fish, who follows the little fish. The little fish remains convinced that the theft will not be found out, but at the end of the story the big fish emerges wearing the hat.

== Writing and illustrations ==
As Roger Sutton noted in his review of the book for The New York Times, the book can only be understood by weighing the words against the actions depicted in the illustrations, since what happens at the end is not explicitly stated but instead left to the reader to figure out. The small fish, acting as the book's narrator through its monologue, is not only amoral but also "outrageous" in the claims that it will not get caught. The small fish can be seen as either talking to the reader or themselves. The book presents a complex ethical message, with an amoral narrator. This Is Not My Hat suggests both not to steal but that if you do steal not to get caught. The reader can both cheer for the little fish's escape and for the little fish to be punished for the theft. The book was part of a trend of authors and illustrators exploring "meta" issues in children's picture books. Critics wondered if the book's success was a sign that young children were able to pick up on ironic humor and if the dark message was a sign of the general American mood.

The book was praised for its design and simplicity. Some reviewers noted Klassen's felicity with using colors like black and brown in the illustrations. The perspective of the illustrations also never changes, staying roughly in a medium shot. The feelings of the characters is expressed almost entirely through their eye movements. The illustrations were compared to those of Caldecott Honor-winning author and illustrator Leo Lionni.

== Reception and awards ==
This Is Not My Hat received favorable reviews including several starred reviews. In its starred review Booklist praised the book's humor and noted its "suggestively dark conclusion", The Bulletin of the Center for Children's Books called the book "quite simply, an outstanding book", and Publishers Weekly wrote that, "Klassen excels at using pictures to tell the parts of the story his unreliable narrators omit or evade". The Horn Book Magazine and School Library Journal also awarded the book starred reviews. In a "highly recommend" review for Library Media Connection librarian Lisa Wright writes, "The narrative parallels the illustrations as the reader deduces the facts of the actual theft." In a review for The New York Times children's literature expert Roger Sutton notes that the action and illustrations mean not all young children will be old enough to understand and appreciate the book.

The book spent more than forty weeks on The New York Times Best Seller list and the combined sales of it and I Want My Hat Back were more than 1.5 million copies. The book appeared on several best of children's books of 2012 lists including Publishers Weekly and Entertainment Weekly.

This Is Not My Hat was the winner of the 2013 Caldecott Medal and Klassen was also awarded with a Caldecott Honor the same year for Extra Yarn (written by Mac Barnett), only the second time that has happened. Caldecott Chair Sandra Imdieke praised the book's illustrations: "With minute changes in eyes and the slightest displacement of seagrass, Klassen's masterful illustrations tell the story the narrator doesn't know." Klassen found out as he was about to get in an early morning cab to fly to California. Klassen was surprised by his win and tried not to think about it, saying, "It's such a prestigious award that the idea of winning one is pretty easy to put out of your head." This Is Not My Hat was also the recipient of the 2014 Kate Greenaway Medal. Klassen is the first person to win both the Greenaway and Caldecott awards for the same work. (Note: Publication year for the British CILIP awards is the school year, roughly, September 2012 to August 2013 for consideration in 2014. Publication year for the American Library Association awards is the preceding calendar year. The ALA considers only picture books published first in the United States for the Caldecott Medal. CILIP considers all illustrated children's books for the Greenaway and its judges recommended the eight books on its 2014 shortlist for children as old as ages 9+.)

== Notes ==
Awards
| Preceded by A Ball for Daisy | Caldecott Medal recipient 2013 | Succeeded by Locomotive |
