= Jon Klassen =

Canadian writer and illustrator (born 1981)

Jon Klassen CM
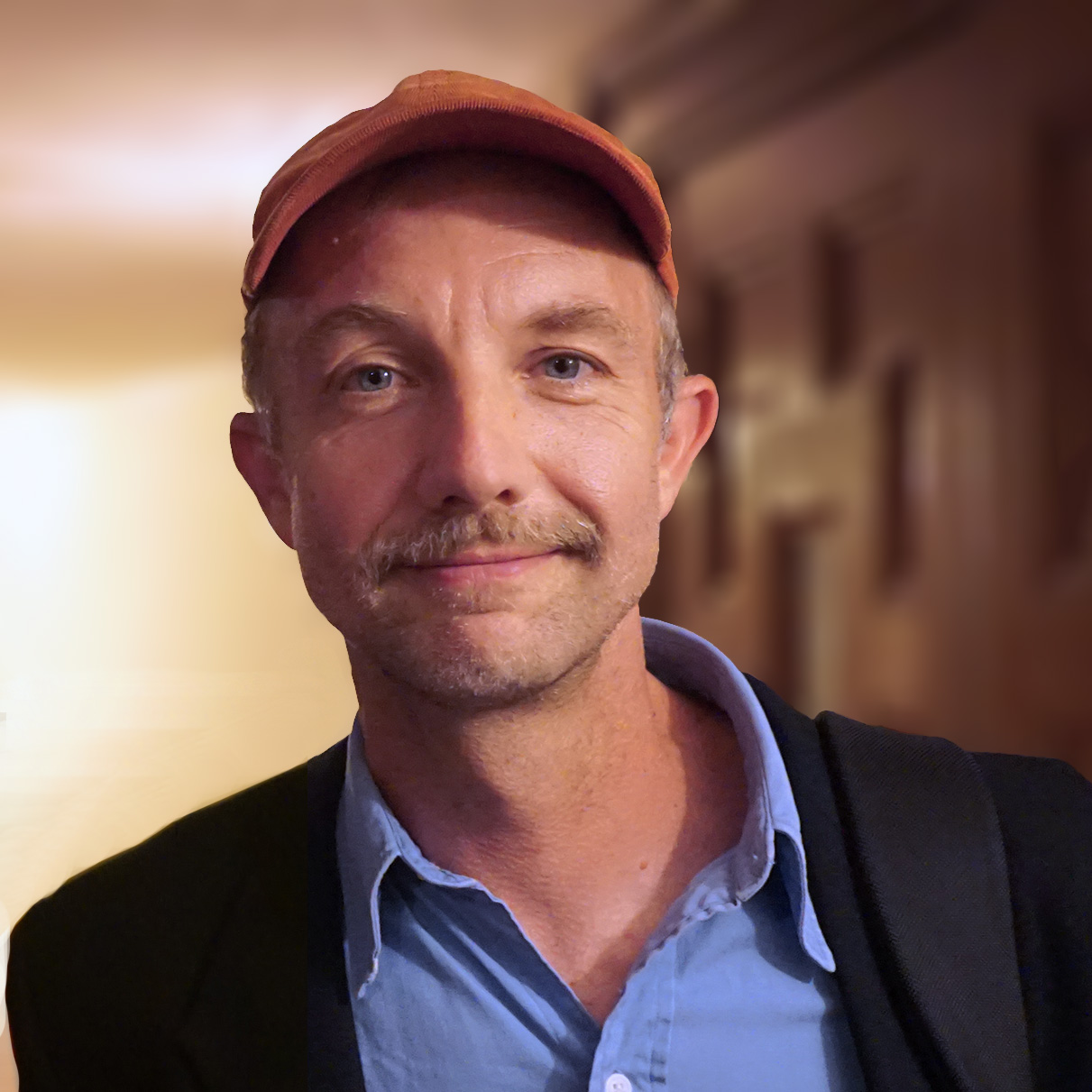
- Klassen in 2026
- Born: November 29, 1981 (age 44); Winnipeg, Manitoba, Canada
- Occupations: Illustrator, writer
- Writing career
- Period: 2005–present
- Genres: Children's picture books, animation
- Notable works: Sam and Dave Dig a Hole (illus.); I Want My Hat Back; This Is Not My Hat
- Notable awards: Governor General's Award; 2010; Caldecott Medal; 2013; Greenaway Medal; 2014; Astrid Lindgren Memorial Award; 2026

Jon Klassen CM (born November 29, 1981) is a Canadian writer and illustrator of children's books, and an animator. He is known for the 2012 picture book This Is Not My Hat, which won both the Caldecott Medal and the Kate Greenaway Medal. This Is Not My Hat is a companion to Klassen's preceding picture book, I Want My Hat Back (2011), which was his first as both writer and illustrator. Both books were on the New York Times Best Seller list for more than 40 weeks; by April 2014 one or the other had been translated into 22 languages and they had jointly surpassed one million worldwide sales. Both books were recommended for children ages 5+ by the Greenaway judges. Klassen's Hat Trilogy was completed with the publication of We Found a Hat (2016).

He received the Astrid Lindgren Memorial Award in 2026.

== Early life and education ==
Klassen was born in Winnipeg, Manitoba, Canada, in 1981 and grew up in Niagara Falls and Toronto, Ontario. He studied animation at Sheridan College, graduated in 2005, and moved to Los Angeles.

== Career ==
In 2005, Klassen made an animated short with Daniel Rodrigues, An Eye for Annai. He subsequently worked as an animator for the feature films Kung Fu Panda (2008) and Coraline (2009) and served as art director for the 2009 animated music video of "I'll Go Crazy If I Don't Go Crazy Tonight" by U2.

In 2010, Klassen achieved international recognition when he was awarded the Governor General's Award for English-language children's illustration for his work on the picture book Cats' Night Out, written by Carolyn Stutson.

=== The Hat trilogy ===
His first solo picture book was I Want My Hat Back, published by Candlewick Press in September 2011. It features a bear looking for his hat, who finally finds it and then off-page eats the rabbit who stole it. The New York Times Book Review named it one of the "10 Best Illustrated Children's Books for 2011". The book was published in September by Candlewick Press. Klassen said of the ending, which has been called a "subversive risk", that "there was no other way for it to end". It achieved considerable commercial success, and even became an internet meme when people started "posting their own versions of the story". Pamela Paul praised the book in review for The New York Times: "it is a wonderful and astonishing thing, the kind of book that makes child laugh and adult chuckle, and both smile in appreciation ... [it is] a charmingly wicked little book and the debut of a promising writer-illustrator talent." According to the Chicago Tribune, "the joy of this book lies in figuring out the explicit plot from the implicit details in the pictures." There has been some discussion of the ending, however: is it appropriate in a children's book that one character kills another without repercussion? A bookseller, who "need[ed] to go on record as saying I LOVE this book", reported that some customers love it until they turn the last pages. It was a runner-up for the American Geisel Award (books for beginning readers) and made the Greenaway shortlist.

Klassen modified the story in a companion book one year later, This Is Not My Hat (Candlewick, 2012). It features a little fish who steals and wears the hat of a big fish, whom the little one evades until the last pages. Finally the big fish swims back into the book, wearing the hat, with no sign of the thief. This installment won the 2013 Caldecott and 2014 Greenaway Medals, from the American and British professional librarians respectively. He is the first person to win both awards for the same work. Only Gail E. Haley had received both medals previously, but for different books.

According to the award committee, "With minute changes in eyes and the slightest displacement of seagrass, Klassen's masterful illustrations tell the story the narrator doesn't know." The Greenaway recognizes "distinguished illustration in a book for children", not necessarily a picture book. According to the British judges, "The format and layout work perfectly to convey the underwater location with the movement of the action flowing with the water from left to right. ... The juxtaposition of text and image works with perfect comic timing. Amazing expression is conveyed by the eyes and dramatic tension by little bubbles." The Greenaway is paired in a London announcement and presentation ceremony with the Carnegie Medal for children's literature, which recognized a controversially grim young-adult novel in 2014. According to the press release, "both winners independently argued that children benefit from stories without happy endings." Klassen said in his acceptance speech, "Making a book, you're kind of going out on a limb in the belief that what you think of as a satisfying story is the same as what other people think of as a satisfying story. This doesn't mean everything in the story turns out alright for everybody, but you, as a storyteller, try and make sure it ends the way the story should end."

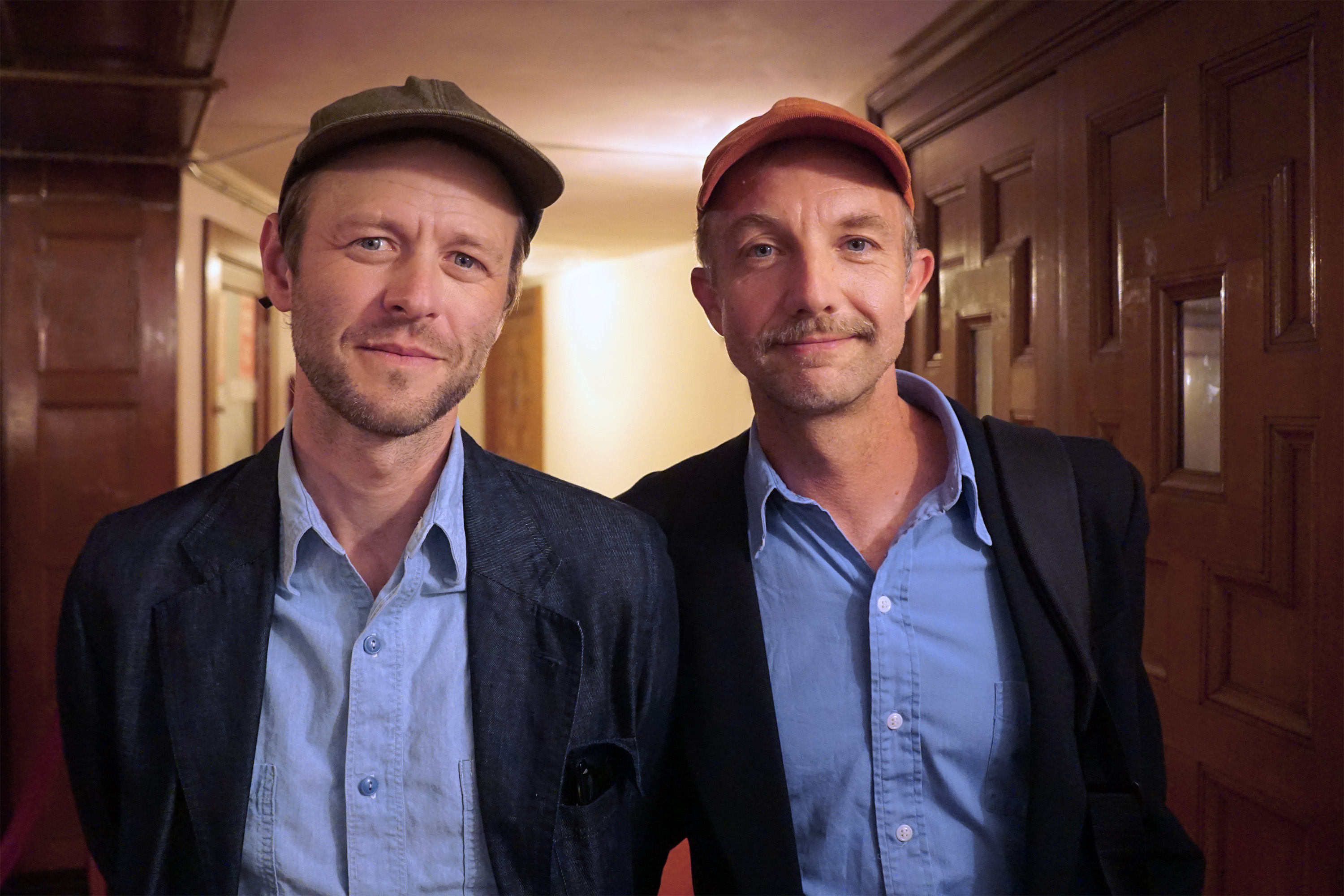
Mac Barnett and Jon Klassen at City Arts & Lectures in San Francisco on May 14, 2026

In 2019, I Want My Hat Back, This Is Not My Hat, and We Found a Hat were released in a boxed set by Candlewick Press as Jon Klassen's Hat Box.

=== Collaboration with Mac Barnett ===
Klassen began collaborating with Mac Barnett in 2012, publishing Extra Yarn. It received a Caldecott Honor in 2013. It was only the second time an author received both a medal and an honor book in the same year. They have published two series together: The Shape Trilogy (2017–2019) and Now I see (2026), alongside stand-alone picture books. In 2024 they launched Looking at picture books a newsletter discussing how picture books work. In 2026 they undertook a tour of lectures about picture books as an art form.

== Personal life ==
As of 2019, Klassen lives in California. He has two children.

== Publications ==
As author and illustrator

- The Hat Trilogy
  - I Want My Hat Back (Candlewick, Sep. 2011). ISBN 9780763655983
  - This Is Not My Hat (Candlewick, Oct. 2012). ISBN 9780763655990
  - We Found a Hat (Candlewick, Oct. 2016). ISBN 9780763656003
- The Rock from the Sky (Candlewick, Apr. 2021). ISBN 9781536215625
- The Skull: A Tyrolean Folktale (Candlewick, July. 2023). ISBN 9781536223361
- Your Places
  - Your Farm (Walker Books, Apr. 2025). ISBN 9781529526868
  - Your Forest (Walker Books, Apr. 2025). ISBN 9781529526844
  - Your Island (Walker Books, Apr. 2025). ISBN 9781529526851

As illustrator

With Mac Barnett

- Extra Yarn (Balzer + Bray, a HarperCollins imprint, Jan. 2012). ISBN 9780061953385
- Sam and Dave Dig a Hole (Candlewick, Oct 2014), ISBN 9780763662295
- The Shape Trilogy
  - Triangle (Candlewick, Mar. 2017). ISBN 9780763696030
  - Square (Candlewick, May 2018). ISBN 9780763696078
  - Circle (Candlewick, Mar. 2019). ISBN 9780763696085
- The Wolf, the Duck, and the Mouse (Candlewick, Oct 2017), ISBN 9780763677541
- The Three Billy Goats Gruff (Orchard Books, Oct 2022), ISBN 9781338673845
- How Does Santa Go Down the Chimney (Penguin Random House, Sept 2023), ISBN 978-1-5362-2376-7Now I See
- Now I See Spring (Tundra Books, Apr. 2026). ISBN 9781774886731
- Now I See Summer (Tundra Books, Apr. 2026). ISBN 9781774886779
- Now I See Fall (Tundra Books, Apr. 2026). ISBN 9781774886656
- Now I See Winter (Tundra Books, April 2026). ISBN 9781774886694

Children's picture books illustrated

- Cats' Night Out, by Carolyn Stutson (Simon & Schuster, Mar 2010), ISBN 9781416940050
- House Held Up By Trees, by Ted Kooser (Candlewick, Mar 2012), ISBN 9780763651077
- The Dark, by Lemony Snicket (Little, Brown, Apr 2013), ISBN 9780316187480

Other books illustrated

- The Incorrigible Children of Ashton Place – series of novels by Maryrose Wood (published by Balzer + Bray) – Hardcover versions
  - Book I: The Mysterious Howling (Feb 2010), ISBN 9780061791055
  - Book II: The Hidden Gallery (Feb 2011), ISBN 9780061791123
  - Book III: The Unseen Guest (Mar 2012), ISBN 9780061791185
  - Book IV: The Interrupted Tale (Dec 2013), ISBN 9780061791222

(Book V: The Unmapped Sea (Apr 2015), ISBN 9780062110411, was illustrated by Eliza Wheeler)

- Vanished, by Sheela Chari (Hyperion, July 2011), ISBN 9781423131632
- The Watch that Ends the Night: Voices from the Titanic, by Allan Wolf (Candlewick, Mar 2013), ISBN 9780763663315
- The Witch's Boy, by Kelly Barnhill (Algonquin, Sep 2014), ISBN 9781616203511
- The Nest, by Kenneth Oppel (Simon & Schuster, Oct 2015), ISBN 9781481432320
- Pax, by Sara Pennypacker (Balzer + Bray, Feb 2016), ISBN 9780062377012
- Skunk and Badger, by Amy Timberlake (Algonquin, Sep 2020), ISBN 9781643750057
- Pax, Journey Home, by Sara Pennypacker (Balzer + Bray, Sep 2021), ISBN 9780062930347
- Egg Marks The Spot, by Amy Timberlake (Algonquin, Sep 2021), ISBN 9781643750064

== Awards (selection) ==
- 2012 Honor, Irma Black Award
- 2013 Honor, Irma Black Award
- 2013 Winner, Deutscher Jugendliteraturpreis for Best Picture Book
- 2013 Caldecott Medal: Honor for Extra Yarn with Mac Barnett, and Winner for This Is Not My Hat. Only Leonard Weisgard previously illustrated two books honored in one year, in 1947.
- 2014 Greenaway Medal winner for This Is Not My Hat, Greenaway Medal shortlist for The Dark, written by Lemony Snicket.
- 2015 Winner, Irma Black Award
- 2015 Honor, Caldecott Medal
- 2023 Finalist, Governor General's Award for Young People's Literature - Illustrated Books
- 2026 Winner, Astrid Lindgren Memorial Award
