= Jewel of the Moon =

1985 short story collection by William Kotzwinkle

- First edition (publ. G.P. Putnam's Sons)
- Author: William Kotzwinkle
- Publisher: G.P. Putnam's Sons
- Publication date: December 5, 1985
- ISBN: 978-0-399-13113-4

Jewel of the Moon (1985) is a collection of short stories by American author William Kotzwinkle. The beautiful and erotic title piece concerns a couple who observe 13 months of subtle sexual foreplay leading up to the inevitable moment of cosmic release. A number of the short stories collected in the volume had been first published in Omni and Penthouse magazines.

== Reception ==
Carolyn See of The Los Angeles Times noted that "these stories are so varied in tone that if you like some, you probably won't be able to stomach the others: the volume is a mixed review." In the St. Petersburg Times William Mingin wrote, "[Kotzwinkle] writes colorfully, with a good eye for detail ... and the easy flow of someone with a natural talent for words. He is often funny, and it is easy to smile at his cheery, if sometimes adolescent, eroticism. But while nothing here is ill-written per se, nothing is memorable, either. The reader looking for more than having his chin chucked by the author will eventually become cranky. Kotzwinkle is good enough to tease, but he almost never delivers." James E. Alexander of The Pittsburgh Post-Gazette remarked, "In these short stories ... the author stretches the surreal limits of the imagination into worlds enchanted and bizarre, beautiful and insane. Yet the reader isn't put off by this, rather he rides along, knowing the roller coaster is going to fling him down and up, tingling his risibilities one moment, churning his stomach the next."
