= Yo! Yes? =

1993 children's picture book by Chris Raschka

- Author: Chris Raschka
- Illustrator: Chris Raschka
- Language: English
- Genre: children's books picture books
- Publisher: Orchard Books
- Publication date: March 1, 1993
- Publication place: United States
- Media type: Print
- Pages: 32
- ISBN: 0-531-05469-1

Yo! Yes? is a 1993 children's picture book written and illustrated by Chris Raschka. The Book was published in March 1993 by Orchard Books.

== Plot ==
The book is about two boys, one black and one white, that meet each other and talk in sentences that have one or two words. The black boy wants to become friends, but the white boy is nervous about making friends. With less than 35 words being spoken between the two of them, they both form a friendship at the end of the book.

== Reception ==
Megan Potter of Common Sense Media wrote, "This is the kind of story that gives even an adult reader a good chuckle. Subsequent readings are even more fun when the punctuation and the plot -- and the expressive illustrations -- guide the tone of the reader's voice". A review from Kirkus Reviews says, "Whether it's caution or prejudice that's overcome, the process is reduced to elementals — two figures, roughly drawn yet vibrant with feeling, and their comical dialogue (a breeze for beginning readers), encompassing a world of meaning".

A 2014 NPR article included the book in their list titled "A Diverse #SummerReading List For Kids". It won a Caldecott Medal in 1994 and it was an American Library Association's Notable Children's Book. An animated version by Weston Woods was released in 2000 and features hip-hop music by Jerry Dale McFadden and narration by Ryan Williams and Tucker Bliss.
