= Stark Naked: A Paranomastic Odyssey =

1969 humor book by Norton Juster

- Author: Norton Juster
- Illustrator: Arnold Roth
- Language: English
- Genre: Humor
- Publisher: Random House
- Publication date: 1969 Out of print
- Publication place: United States
- Media type: Print (Hardcover)
- Pages: approx. 100

Stark Naked is a book of humor written by Norton Juster, an American architect and author. It was published by Random House in 1969, Library of Congress Control Number 71–85568. It is currently out of print. The illustrator was Arnold Roth. The book is a series of names, each of which is play on words. Juster himself talked about the funny fake names he would invent as a child. The title is unusual, the word paronomastic means "play on words" or "punning". The misspelling "paranomastic" might be intentional, but this spelling is often used.

== Plot summary ==
Emotional Heights is a town where everybody's name is a play on words. The hero, Stark Naked, is a naked (except for a beret and a large 1930s-era motion picture camera) film-maker who wanders about the town seemingly amazed and perplexed by the unusual names of the townspeople. He walks in from the highway and makes his way past the town's distinguished and not so distinguished citizens. Some of the names are in lists, other names are illustrated by Roth, in a melancholy, yet humorous style. He marvels at the school ("Get High" with principal Martin Nett), the business district (home of Walter Wall Rugs) and the university (where he finds the intellectual Noel Lott). He finishes up at a restaurant (Chef Al Dente), the hospital (Carson Oma, M.D.) and finally the town cemetery (Last resting place of Dustin Toodust).

== Characters ==
=== Main characters ===
- Stark Naked, an unclothed cartoon-figure cameraman, the main character. He is a polite, unobtrusive and quiet observer.
- Emotional Heights, is the town where the cameraman makes his incredulous journey.

=== Minor characters ===
- Arnie Swa, husband of K. Molly Panse. This husband and wife team on the back cover give the point of the book. Their names are based on Honi soit qui mal y pense which is the motto of the English Order of the Garter. It means literally "shame upon he who thinks ill of it" or in American vernacular: "Evil to he who thinks evil".
- Ellis Dee, a drugged-out bearded college student seen floating above the university Groove U.
- Yetta Nother, a haggard mother with about twelve children.
