= Henry Marshall (physician) =

Scottish military surgeon

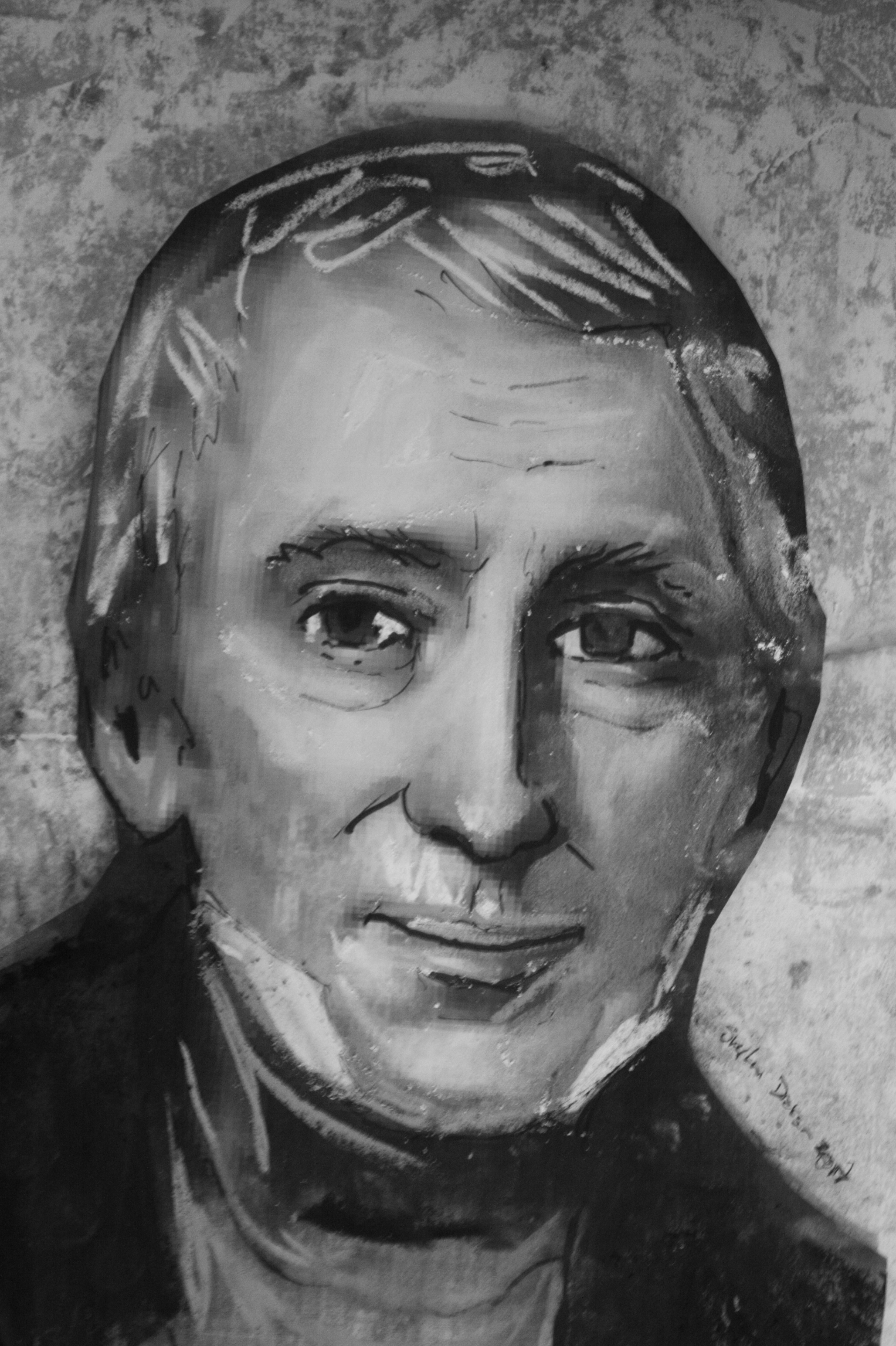
Dr Henry Marshall

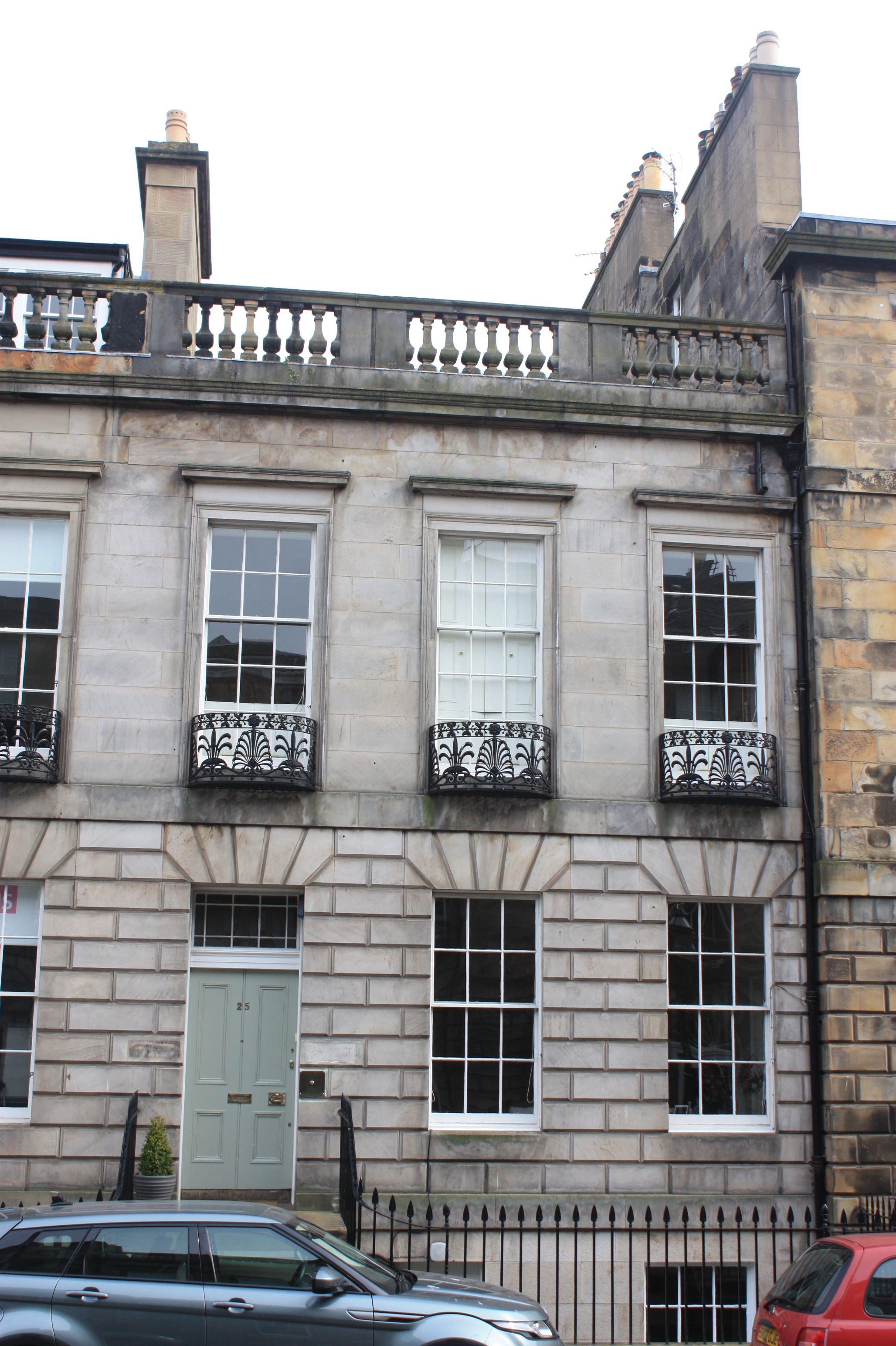
Marshall's house at 25 Alva Street, Edinburgh

Dr Henry Marshall FRSE (1775–1851) was a Scottish military surgeon, hygienist and medical author. He served as Inspector General of all British military hospitals in the early 19th century. He is known as the “founder of military medical statistics”. He also campaigned strongly for the abolition of flogging as an army punishment.

== Life ==
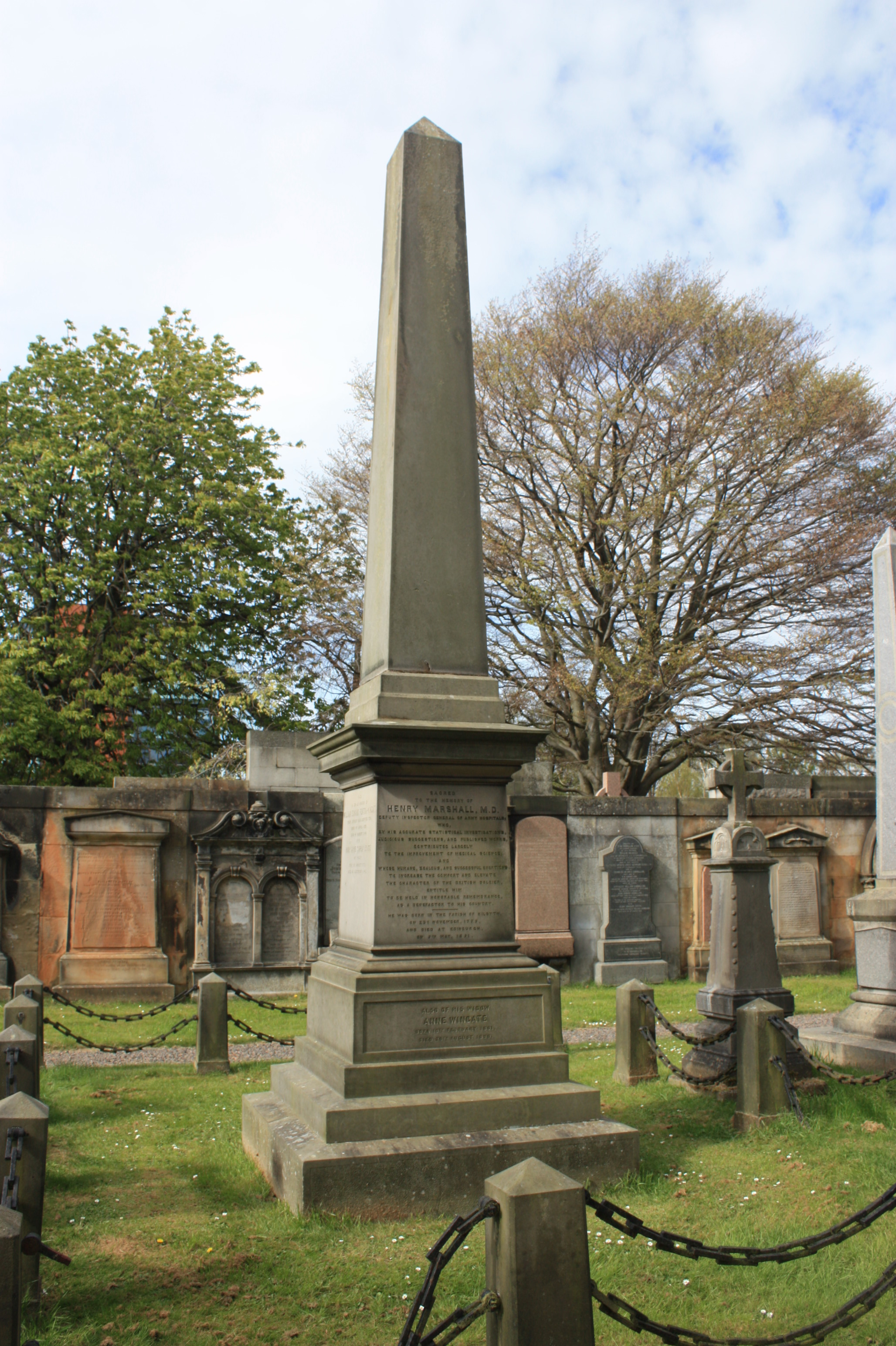
The grave of Dr Henry Marshall, Dean Cemetery

Henry was born on 23 November 1775 near Kilsyth in Stirlingshire the son of John Marshall, a farmer. His maternal uncle, the Rev Robert Rennie, had written statistical accounts of the local population, and this link seemed to instil an early love of this field.

Henry obtained a place at Glasgow University studying medicine. In May 1803, in the midst of the Napoleonic Wars, he received a post as a surgeon's mate within the Royal Navy. In January 1805 he transferred to a land-based role with the Forfarshire Militia and in April 1806 moved again, to serve the 69th Regiment of Foot. With the latter he served in South America at the Cape of Good Hope and later in Ceylon. During this period he began tabulating statistics of soldiers and various diseases in an attempt to understand under-lying patterns.

In 1809 he was gazetted as Assistant Surgeon to the 2nd Ceylon Regiment and in 1813 became full Surgeon to the 1st Ceylon Regiment. He saw action in the Second Kandyan War. In 1821 he returned to Britain, living briefly in Edinburgh before going south to the hospital at Chatham Docks in 1823. In 1825 he moved to Dublin in Ireland to work in the medical assessment of recruits. In 1830 he was appointed Deputy Inspector of Hospitals for the British Army. From around this time he lived in Edinburgh, first at 33 Minto Street before moving to 25 Alva Street in 1834.

In 1835, together with Sir A. M. Tulloch, he was instructed to create statistics of military mortalities and illnesses leading to discharge from the Army. In 1839 he was elected a Fellow of the Royal Society of Edinburgh his proposer being John Stark. In 1846 he was elected a member of the Harveian Society of Edinburgh. In 1847 the University of New York awarded him a further honorary doctorate.

He died at home 25 Alva Street, in Edinburgh’s West End on 5 May 1851, following a long and painful illness. His grave in Dean Cemetery lies to the north-west of the original cemetery and is marked by a large and distinctive obelisk.

== Family ==
In 1832, when he was 57 years old, he married Anne Wingate (1801–1899), eldest daughter of John Wingate of Westshiels in Roxburghshire, and 26 years his junior.

== Publications ==
- A Description of the Laurus Cinnamomum (1817)
- Notes on the Medical Topography of the Interior of Ceylon (1821)
- Observations on the State of Health of Troops in North Britain (1823)
- Hints to Young Medical Officers in the Army on the Examination of Recruits and the Feigned Disabilities of Soldiers (1828)
- On the Enlisting, the Discharging, and the Pensioning of Soldiers (1832)
- Military Miscellany (1846)
- Ceylon, a General Description of the Island (1846)
- Suggestions for the Advancement of Military Medical Literature (1849)

== Artistic recognition ==
His portrait, by Sir Daniel Macnee, is held by the Scottish National Portrait Gallery, but is not on display.

His biography was written by Dr John Brown.
