= The Hello, Goodbye Window =

2005 picture book by Norton Juster

- Author: Norton Juster
- Illustrator: Chris Raschka
- Genre: Children's picture book
- Publisher: Michael Di Capua Books/Hyperion Books for Children
- Publication date: 2005
- Publication place: United States
- Media type: Paperback and hardcover
- Pages: 32
- ISBN: 0-7868-0914-0
- OCLC: 59280738
- Dewey Decimal: [E] 22
- LC Class: PZ7.J98 He 2005

The Hello, Goodbye Window is a children's picture book written by Norton Juster and illustrated by Chris Raschka. Published in 2005, the book tells the story of a little girl who enjoys visiting her grandparents. Raschka won the 2006 Caldecott Medal for his illustrations.

== Description ==
The story, written by Norton Juster, is told in present tense from a little girl's point of view (first-person narrative) while she is visiting her grandparents' (Nanna & Poppy) big house in the middle of town. The illustrations by Raschka are "at once lively and energetic, without crowding the story or the words on the page; the simple lines and squiggles of color suggest a child's own drawings, but this is the art of a masterful hand."

The book's dimensions are 10.5 x 0.5 x 11.4 inches. It is 32 pages long, an industry standard for children's books.

== Synopsis ==
A girl visits her grandparents' house, where for her the kitchen window is a special gateway, where everything important happens. Told from her point of view, the story explores her special relationship with her grandparents through the window, by the window and around the window. She tells us how the window is perfect for looking into the kitchen from the porch to play a game of peek-a-boo with Nanna, and even turns into a mirror at night. She describes her experience with her grandparents and all the fun things there are to do in the house, as well as the things she has been told to stay away from. She helps Nanna in the garden and listens to Poppy play "Oh! Susanna" on the harmonica; she enjoys it even though it is the only song he can play. When her parents come to pick the girl up, she is happy and sad at the same time, but she understands "it just happens that way sometimes."

== Critical reception ==
The Hello Goodbye Window was published to favorable reviews and is recommended for grades Pre K-1. Lisa Von Drasek, a curator of the Children's Literature Research Collections for the University of Minnesota recommended The Hello, Goodbye Window for teachers to read aloud in class, saying that it is a great role model for young children. Publishers Weekly called it "endearing", and Teaching Pre K-8 called it a "joyous tale". Kirkus Reviews claimed that Juster's present-tense narration is "just right" and "Raschka's mixed-media illustrations are characteristically loose and energetic". Martha V Parravano from The Horn Book Magazine raved that "A varied layout, balancing exterior and interior landscapes with smaller character vignettes, helps sustain the book's energy. Say hello to Raschka at the top of his form."

Awards
Preceded by Kitten's First Full Moon	Caldecott Medal recipient 2006	Succeeded by Flotsam
