= We Found a Hat =

2016 picture book by Jon Klassen

- Author: Jon Klassen
- Illustrator: Jon Klassen
- Cover artist: Jon Klassen
- Language: English
- Genre: Children's book
- Publisher: Candlewick Press
- Publication date: 2016
- Publication place: United States
- Media type: Print (hardback & paperback)
- Pages: 56 (unpaginated)
- ISBN: 9780763656003
- OCLC: 934743481

We Found a Hat is a 2016 children's picture book by the Canadian author and illustrator Jon Klassen. In October 2019, Candlewick Press, the book's publisher, released a boxed set featuring We Found a Hat along with its two companion books (This Is Not My Hat and I Want My Hat Back), calling it Jon Klassen's Hat Box. In 2018, Weston Woods Studios, Inc. made an animated version of this book, narrated by Johnny Heller and Christopher Curry.

== Reception ==
We Found a Hat was received favorably, with a number of starred reviews including from Publishers Weekly, Quill & Quire, the School Library Journal, and Booklist.

The New York Journal of Books wrote "The ending feels almost wrong, a bit too easy, too happily ever after but only in my dreams." and concluded "We Found a Hat and the trilogy as a whole provides an entertaining, easy to read story on one level but also grants plenty of space for more complex and lively discussion."

It has also been reviewed by The Globe and Mail. Common Sense Media, Kirkus Reviews, and The Horn Book.

== Plot ==
Two turtles come across a hat and they find that it looks good on both of them. Therefore they leave the hat since it would be unfair for one of them to wear a hat and the other not to. However, one turtle still wants it. When they are looking at the sunset, one of the turtle asks what is they thinking about, and the other turtle replied with the sunset. Then, they ask what that turtle was thinking about, in which they reply with “Nothing.” while looking at the hat. The 2 turtles go to sleep after, and one turtle asks what they are dreaming about, while being by the hat, where that turtle says “I am dreaming that I have a hat. It looks very good on me.” then they say “You are also there too. You have a hat. It looks very good on you too.” The turtle by the hat, says, “We both have hats?” and goes back to where the other turtle was sleeping, and rests by them.

== See also ==
- I Want My Hat Back
- This Is Not My Hat
