= I Want My Hat Back =

2011 children's picture book by Jon Klassen

- front cover of unknown edition
- Author: Jon Klassen
- Illustrator: Jon Klassen
- Language: English
- Genre: Children's picture book
- Publisher: Candlewick Press
- Publication date: 2011
- Publication place: United States
- Media type: Print (hardback & paperback)
- Pages: 40 pp
- ISBN: 978-0763655983

I Want My Hat Back is a 2011 children's picture book by author and illustrator Jon Klassen. It was Klassen's first book as both author and illustrator. The book was published by Candlewick Press in September 2011. It is notable for its dark ending.

== Plot ==
A bear laments his lost hat, and sets off to find it. He asks a fox and a frog if they have seen it, but neither has. The bear then asks a rabbit who is wearing a red pointy hat. The rabbit answers negatively and defensively, ending "Don't ask me any more questions." The bear then moves on to ask a turtle, a snake, and a mole. None have seen the hat. A deer comes upon the despondent bear and asks him what his hat looked like. Upon recollecting that his hat was red and pointy, the bear snaps to a realisation and runs back to the rabbit. He accuses the rabbit of stealing his hat. On the next page, the bear sits on a rustled patch of ground, wearing his red pointy hat. A squirrel enters and asks the bear if he has seen a rabbit wearing a hat. The bear answers negatively and defensively, implying he ate the rabbit and ending with "Don't ask me any more questions." The squirrel exits, leaving the bear sitting alone.

== Reception and awards ==
The book achieved considerable commercial success, spending 48 weeks on the New York Times bestseller list. Pamela Paul praised the book in review for The New York Times: "it is a wonderful and astonishing thing, the kind of book that makes child laugh and adult chuckle, and both smile in appreciation ... [it is] a charmingly wicked little book and the debut of a promising writer-illustrator talent." According to the Chicago Tribune, "the joy of this book lies in figuring out the explicit plot from the implicit details in the pictures." There has been some discussion of the ending over the appropriateness of a character killing another without repercussion in a children's book. A bookseller, who "need[ed] to go on record as saying I LOVE this book", reported that some customers love it until they turn the last pages. It made the Kate Greenaway Medal shortlist, and was a Geisel Award honor book.

== Adaptations ==
An animated version of I Want My Hat Back was produced by Weston Woods Studios and Bigfott Studios in 2013. The film was adapted, directed, and animated by Galen Fott. Jon Klassen provided the voice of the deer. It was a nominee for the Golden Gate Award at the San Francisco International Film Festival. It also won second prize for Best Animated Short Film in the Children's Jury of the Chicago International Children's Film Festival.

A musical stage adaptation of the book opened on November 12, 2015, at the National Theatre in London. It was directed by Wils Wilson, with book and lyrics by Joel Horwood and music by Arthur Darvill. The production was warmly received; Susannah Clapp of The Guardian hailed the production's “inspired, homespun magic” and asserted “No one will want their cash back.” The National Theatre production was nominated for the Olivier Award for Best Family and Entertainment Show.

In October 2019, Candlewick Press released a boxed set featuring I Want My Hat Back along with its two companion books (This Is Not My Hat and We Found a Hat), calling it Jon Klassen's Hat Box.

During the United Kingdom's first Covid lockdown Sam Wilde and Ian Nicholson created and performed a stage version made only from cardboard boxes. This was put on to YouTube with great reception. This was then picked up by Little Angel Theatre and became a successful national tour with large full sized puppets – still made from cardboard – and included the complete trilogy.
