= The Fan Man =

1974 novel by William Kotzwinkle

The Fan Man (book)
- First edition
- Author: William Kotzwinkle
- Language: English
- Genre: Novel
- Publisher: Avon Books
- Publication date: 1974
- Publication place: United States
- Media type: Print (Paperback)
- Pages: 208 p. (1994 paperback edition)
- ISBN: 978-0-679-75245-5 (1994 paperback edition)
- OCLC: 29357362
- Dewey Decimal: 813/.54 20
- LC Class: PS3561.O85 F36 1994

The Fan Man is a cult comic novel published in 1974 by the American writer William Kotzwinkle. It is told in stream-of-consciousness style by the narrator, Horse Badorties (the titular "fan man"), a down-at-the-heels hippie living a life of drug-fueled befuddlement in New York City c. 1970. The book is written in a colorful, vernacular "hippie-speak" and tells the story of the main character's hapless attempts to put together a benefit concert featuring his own hand-picked choir of 15-year-old girls.

Horse is a somewhat tragic, though humorous, character. In his inability to follow anything through to completion he displays symptoms of attention-deficit disorder though this could equally be drug-induced. His defining characteristic is his joy in renting or commandeering apartments which he fills with street-scavenged junk articles until, full to bursting, he moves on to his next "pad". The name "fan man" is a reference to another of his traits; the collecting and selling of fans of all shapes and sizes. The book's most memorably absurd section is the chapter titled "Dorky Day" which features the repetitive statement of the word "dorky" by Horse as a cathartic mantra to dispel the ennui of a dead-end day.

== Reception ==
Kirkus Reviews gave a starred review to The Fan Man, praising Kotzwinkle as a "lyric genius".
