= William Kotzwinkle =

American writer

- Born: Scranton, Pennsylvania, U.S.
- Occupations: Novelist, screenwriter
- Spouse: Elizabeth Gundy (m. 1965)
- Website: www.kotzwinkle.com

William Kotzwinkle (born November 22, 1938; 87 years ago, or 1943; 83 years ago according to different sources) is an American novelist, children's writer, and screenwriter. He was born in Scranton, Pennsylvania, U.S.A. He won the World Fantasy Award for Best Novel for Doctor Rat in 1977, and has also won the National Magazine Award for fiction. Kotzwinkle is known for writing the novelization of the screenplay for E.T. the Extra-Terrestrial.

He has been married to author Elizabeth Gundy since 1970.

== Personal life ==
William Kotzwinkle was the only child of William John Kotzwinkle and Madolyn Murphy Kotzwinkle. He attended Rider College and later Penn State, where he began writing poetry as a literature major, until he was dismissed from the university. In 1957, he moved to New York City and embraced the beatnik community in Greenwich Village, working various odd jobs in addition to copywriting and writing for a tabloid. The Fireman, his first published book, was accepted for publication by Pantheon in 1969.

In 1970, he married Elizabeth Gundy and the two moved to New Brunswick. in 1974, he published The Fan Man, a novel focused on the Greenwich Village scene in the 1960s. On reading The Fan Man, Steven Spielberg asked Kotzwinkle to come to Hollywood and write the novelization of his upcoming film, E.T. the Extra-Terrestrial. The novelization was published in 1982 and became the best-selling novel of the year.

== List of works ==
=== Novels ===
- Hermes 3000 (1972)
- The Fan Man (1974)
- Night Book (1974)
- Swimmer in the Secret Sea (1975) (a short story published in mass-market paperback format, as a sort of chapbook)
- Doctor Rat (1976)
- Fata Morgana (1977) (illustrated by Wayne Anderson)
- Herr Nightingale And the Satin Woman (1978) (graphic novel, illustrated by Joe Servello)
- Jack in the Box (1980) (later re-titled as Book of Love at the release of the movie based on it)
- Christmas at Fontaine's (1982)
- Superman III (1983) (based on the screenplay by David Newman and Leslie Newman)
- Great World Circus (1983) (illustrated by Joe Servello)
- Queen of Swords (1983)
- Seduction in Berlin (1985) (long story poem, illustrated by Joe Servello)
- The Exile (1987)
- The Midnight Examiner (1989)
- The Game of Thirty (1994) (reissued 2007 as The Game of 30)
- The Bear Went Over the Mountain (1996)
- The Amphora Project (2005)
- Felonious Monk (2021)
- Bloody Martini (2023)

==== E.T. the Extra-Terrestrial series ====
- E.T. the Extra-Terrestrial (1982) (based on Melissa Mathison's screenplay)
- E.T.: The Book of the Green Planet (1985)

=== Collections ===
- Elephant Bangs Train (1971) (short stories)
- The Oldest Man: And Other Timeless Stories (1971) (juvenile)
- Trouble in Bugland: A Collection of Inspector Mantis Mysteries (1983) (juvenile)
- Jewel of the Moon (1985) (short stories)
- Hearts of Wood: And Other Timeless Tales (1986) (juvenile)
- The Hot Jazz Trio (1989) (3 short stories, illustrated by Joe Servello)
- Tales from the Empty Notebook (1995) (juvenile)
- Double Trouble in Bugland: A New Collection of Inspector Mantis Mysteries (2016) (juvenile)

=== Short stories ===
- "Follow The Eagle" (1971)
- "The Curio Shop" (1980)
- "Fragments of Papyrus from the Temple of the Older Gods" (1988)
- "Blues on the Nile: A Fragment of Papyrus" (1989)
- "Boxcar Blues" (1989)
- "Django Reinhardt Played the Blues" (1989) (story about Django Reinhardt)
- "Horse Badorties Goes Out" (1973)
- "The Magician"

=== Children's books ===
- The Firemen (1969)
- Elephant Boy: A Story of the Stone Age (1970)
- The Day the Gang Got Rich (1970)
- The Ship That Came Down The Gutter (1970)
- The Return of Crazy Horse (1971)
- The Supreme, Superb, Exalted and Delightful, One and Only Magic Building (1973)
- Up the Alley with Jack and Joe (1974)
- The Leopard's Tooth (1976)
- The Ants Who Took Away Time (1978)
- Dream of Dark Harbor: A Ghostly Sea Story (1979)
- The Nap Master (1979)
- E. T. The Extra-Terrestrial Storybook (1982)
- The World Is Big and I'm So Small (1986) ISBN 0-517-56310-X
- The Empty Notebook (1990)
- The Million-Dollar Bear (1995)
- Walter the Farting Dog series (with Glenn Murray and Elizabeth Gundy) (illustrations by Audrey Colman)
  - Walter the Farting Dog (2001) ISBN 1-58394-053-7 (published in Latin as Walter, Canis Inflatus (2004) ISBN 1-58394-110-X)
  - Walter the Farting Dog: Trouble at the Yard Sale (2004) ISBN 0-525-47217-7 (also published as Walter the Farting Dog Farts Again)
  - Rough Weather Ahead for Walter the Farting Dog (2005) ISBN 0-525-47218-5
  - Walter the Farting Dog goes on a Cruise (2006) ISBN 0-525-47714-4
  - Walter The Farting Dog: Banned From the Beach (June 21, 2007) ISBN 0-525-47812-4

=== Screenplays ===
- A Nightmare on Elm Street 4: The Dream Master (1988) (original story, for the film)
- Book of Love (1990) (adapted from his novel Jack in the Box, for the film)
