= Norton Juster =

American academic, architect, writer (1929–2021)

Norton Philip Juster
- Born: June 2, 1929; Brooklyn, New York, U.S.
- Died: March 8, 2021 (aged 91); Northampton, Massachusetts, U.S.
- Education: University of Pennsylvania University of Liverpool
- Occupations: Academic, writer
- Writing career
- Period: 1961–2021 (children's writer)
- Genres: Children's fiction, wordplay
- Notable works: The Phantom Tollbooth; The Dot and the Line

Norton Juster (June 2, 1929 – March 8, 2021) was an American academic, architect, and writer. He was best known as an author of children's books, notably for The Phantom Tollbooth (1961) and The Dot and the Line (1963).

== Early life ==
Juster was born in Brooklyn on June 2, 1929. Both his parents were Jewish and immigrated to the United States. His father, Samuel Juster, was born in Romania and became an architect through a correspondence course. His mother, Minnie Silberman, was of Polish Jewish descent. His brother, Howard, became an architect as well. Juster studied architecture at the University of Pennsylvania, obtaining a bachelor's degree in 1952. He went on to study city planning at the University of Liverpool.

== Career ==
Juster enlisted in the Civil Engineer Corps of the United States Navy in 1954, and rose to the rank of lieutenant junior grade. During one tour, to combat boredom, he began to write and illustrate a story for children, but the commanding officer later reprimanded him for it. Still, Juster also finished an unpublished satirical fairy tale called "The Passing of Irving". Later posted in the Brooklyn Navy Yard, again to combat boredom, he made up a non-existent military publication called the Naval News Service as a scheme to request interviews with attractive women. It worked so amazingly well that a neighbor asked to come along as his assistant. His next scheme was to make the "Garibaldi Society" (inspired by a statue in Washington Square Park), whose raison d'être was to reject anyone who applied for membership, designing an impressive logo, application, and rejection letter. It was at this time he met Jules Feiffer while taking out the trash.

Approximately six months after meeting Feiffer, Juster received his discharge from the Navy, and worked for a Manhattan architectural firm. He also did some part-time teaching and undertook other jobs. Juster, Feiffer, and another friend rented an apartment on State Street. Juster also resorted to pulling pranks occasionally on Feiffer. Juster's children's novel, The Phantom Tollbooth, was published in 1961, with Feiffer doing the drawings. This was followed by The Dot and the Line (1963), which became a standard book in classrooms around the country. Juster went on to author Alberic the Wise and Other Journeys (1965), Stark Naked: A Paranomastic Odyssey (1969), Otter Nonsense (1982), and As Silly as Knees, as Busy as Bees (1998), among other works. He also published A Woman's Place: Yesterday's Women in Rural America in 1996 for an adult audience, based on his personal experience of residing on a farm in Massachusetts.

Although Juster enjoyed writing, his architectural career remained his primary emphasis. He served as a professor of architecture and environmental design at Hampshire College from 1970 to 1992, when he retired. He also co-founded a small architectural firm, Juster Pope Associates, in Shelburne Falls, Massachusetts, in 1970. The firm was renamed Juster Pope Frazier after Jack Frazier joined the firm in 1978.

== Later life ==
Juster lived in Massachusetts during his later years. His wife, Jeanne, died in October 2018 after 54 years of marriage. Although he retired from architecture, he continued to write for many years. His book The Hello, Goodbye Window, published May 15, 2005, won the Caldecott Medal for Chris Raschka's illustration in 2006. The sequel, Sourpuss and Sweetie Pie, was published in 2008. Two years later, he teamed up again with Feiffer for The Odious Ogre.

Juster died on March 8, 2021, at his home in Northampton, Massachusetts. He was 91, and suffered from complications of a stroke prior to his death.

== Books ==
- The Phantom Tollbooth (1961; ISBN 0-394-81500-9), illustrated by Jules Feiffer
- The Dot and the Line: A Romance in Lower Mathematics (1963; ISBN 1-58717-066-3)
- Alberic the Wise and Other Journeys (1965; ISBN 0-88708-243-2)
- Stark Naked: A Paranomastic Odyssey (1969; LCCN 71-85568), illus. Arnold Roth
- So Sweet to Labor: Rural Women in America 1865–1895 (editor; 1979; ISBN 0-670-65483-3)—nonfiction
- Otter Nonsense (1982; ISBN 0-399-20932-8), illus. Eric Carle
- As: A Surfeit of Similes (1989; ISBN 0-688-08139-8)
- A Woman's Place: Yesterday's Women in Rural America (1996; ISBN 1-55591-250-8)—nonfiction
- The Hello, Goodbye Window (Michael Di Capua Books, 2005; ISBN 0-7868-0914-0), illus. Chris Raschka
- Sourpuss and Sweetie Pie (2008; ISBN 9780439929431), illus. Chris Raschka
- The Odious Ogre (2010; ISBN 0-545-16202-5), illus. Jules Feiffer
- Neville (2011; ISBN 978-0375867651), illus. G. Brian Karas

== Other media ==
Both The Phantom Tollbooth and The Dot and the Line were adapted into films by animator Chuck Jones. The latter film received the 1966 Academy Award for Best Animated Short Film.

The Phantom Tollbooth was also adapted into a musical by Juster and Sheldon Harnick, with lyrics by Sheldon Harnick and music composed by Arnold Black.

There have been musical settings of "A Colorful Symphony" from The Phantom Tollbooth for narrator and orchestra and of The Dot and the Line for narrator and chamber ensemble by composer Robert Xavier Rodriguez.
