= Walter the Farting Dog =

Fictional character created by William Kotzwinkle and Glenn Murray

- Created by: William Kotzwinkle; Glenn Murray

In-universe information
- Species: Dog
- Gender: Male

Walter the Farting Dog is the title character of a series of five children's books written by William Kotzwinkle and Glenn Murray, and illustrated by Audrey Colman. The first book was published in 2001. By 2011, the first book had reported sales of more than 1.4 million hardcover copies, and the series had grown to five titles. The book has a hidden spider on every page except one, which has puzzled readers. Audrey Colman, the illustrator, received hundreds of emails asking why that one spider was missing on the page where Walter was wolfing down an entire box of Fart-Free Biskwee dog biscuits (the phonetic pronunciation of "Biskwee" being a nod to the illustrator’s birthplace of Montréal, Québec), to which she usually answered, "The spider‘s in the cupboard on that page" before admitting she’d forgotten to add it that time. There is also a stuffed Walter plush toy in two sizes, which includes sound effects, made by Merrymakers in Oakland, California.

== Publishing history ==
Kotzwinkle and Murray conceived the idea for the first book in 1990, inspired by a real-life dog named Walter, whose owner fed him doughnuts and beer, and who was prone to foul-smelling flatulence. With assistance from Kotzwinkle's wife, Elizabeth Gundy, they devised a story about a dog who overcomes two burglars with his smelly farts. Eleven years passed before they found a willing publisher, North Atlantic Books, and the right illustrator, Audrey Colman. The book was a success and reached the top of The New York Times children's best seller list. Beginning with the second book, the series has been published by Penguin Books, and Gundy began receiving credit with the third book.

In 2008, it was reported that plans were under way to develop the series as a movie project for the Jonas Brothers. As of summer 2011, the Jonas Brothers were no longer attached, and Tim Hill was in discussions to direct the film for producers Mary Parent and the Farrelly Brothers. As of 2024, it's unknown if the film is still in production or not.

== Reception ==
The books have been criticized by some as an example of "poop fiction" for children (in the same vein as titles such as Captain Underpants and Zombie Bums from Uranus); they have been subjected to occasional complaints and attempts to have the books withdrawn from libraries, and some librarians and bookstores have refused to carry the series. On the other hand, librarians (and others) have credited the books with effectively attracting young readers who might otherwise be hard to reach. In addition, many copies have been sold to adults. White House Chief of Staff Josh Bolten reportedly kept the book in his office as a "conversation-starter".

The New Statesman's John Sutherland, comparing Walter to the 1956 children's classic Harry the Dirty Dog, commented that Walter "is to Harry as Portnoy was to sexually uptight Holden Caulfield - dirtier". Noting that the "books carry the epigraph 'For everyone who is misjudged or misunderstood'", he concluded that they are ultimately about promoting "self-esteem".

== Books in series ==
All are by William Kotzwinkle, Glenn Murray, and illustrated by Audrey Colman except as noted:

- Walter the Farting Dog (2001) ISBN 1-58394-053-7
- Walter the Farting Dog: Trouble at the Yard Sale (2004) ISBN 0-525-47217-7 (This book has also been released in the U.K. as Walter the Farting Dog Farts Again and as Walter the Farting Dog: Trouble at the Garage Sale in Australia.)
- Rough Weather Ahead for Walter the Farting Dog (2005) ISBN 0-525-47218-5 (co-written with Elizabeth Gundy) (this book has also been released as 'Walter the Farting Dog and the Windy Day' in the U.K.)
- Walter the Farting Dog Goes On A Cruise (2006) ISBN 0-525-47714-4 (co-written with Elizabeth Gundy)
- Walter the Farting Dog: Banned From the Beach (June 21, 2007) ISBN 0-525-47812-4 (co-written with Elizabeth Gundy)
- (NOTE: Elizabeth Gundy was actually a "silent but deadly partner" in the first two books as well.)

== In other languages ==
The original Walter story is now available in more than a dozen languages, including French, Spanish, Dutch, Icelandic, Norwegian, Korean, Japanese, and Latin.

- Latin: Walter, Canis Inflatus (2004) ISBN 1-58394-110-X
- Spanish: Walter, El Perro Pedorrero ISBN 84-96517-10-1
- French: Walter le chien qui pète ISBN 1-58394-104-5
- Dutch: Walter: een scheet van een hond ISBN 90-5000-631-0
- Norwegian Bokmål: Prompehunden Walter ISBN 82-92382-04-6
- Icelandic: Valtýr prumpuhundur ISBN 9979-781-56-4
- Japanese: おなら犬ウォルター (Onara Inu Waruta) ISBN 4-7631-9690-1
