= John Brown (physician, born 1810) =

Scottish physician and essayist (1810–1882)

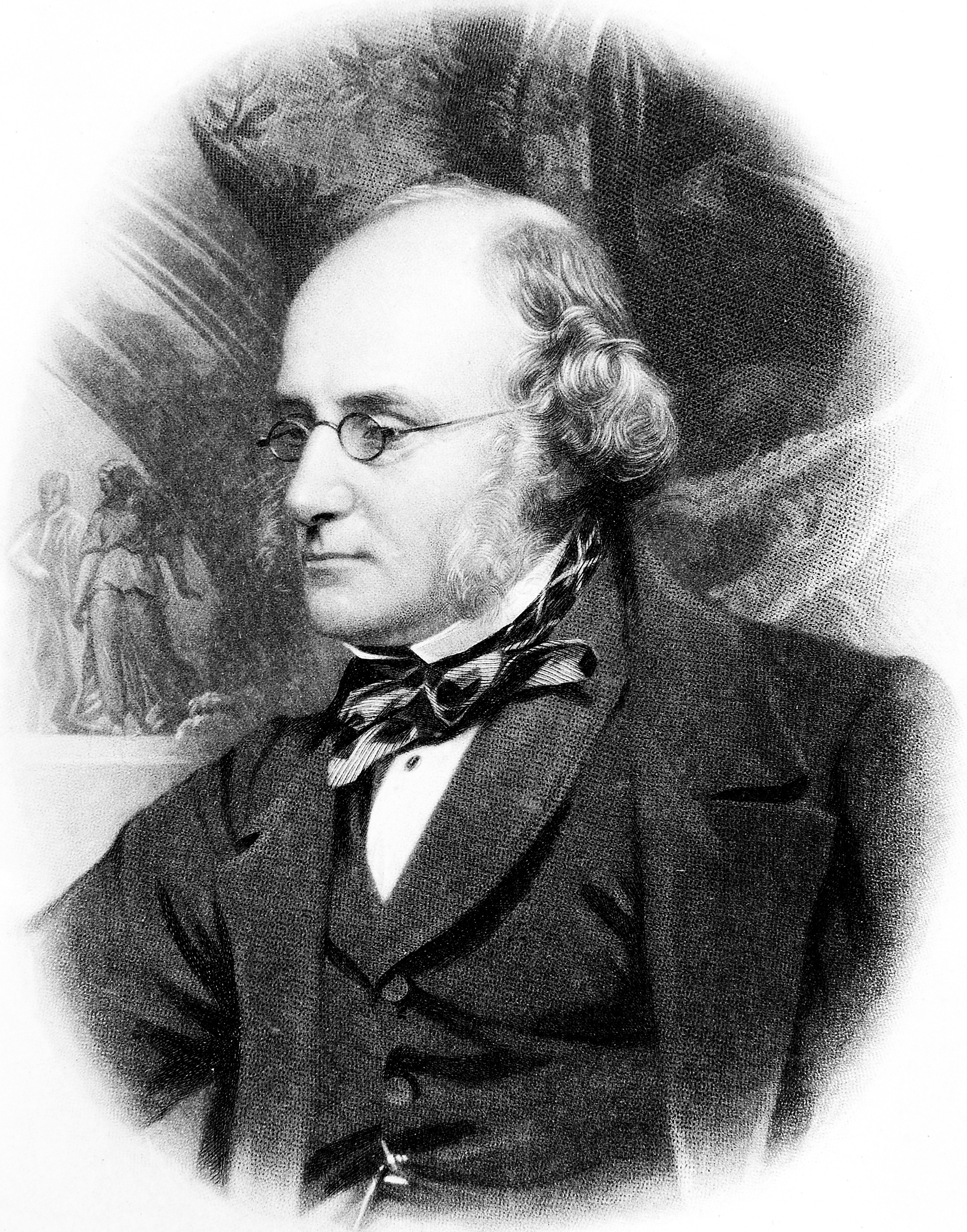
- Born: 22 September 1810; Biggar, South Lanarkshire, Scotland
- Died: 11 May 1882 (aged 71); Edinburgh, Scotland
- Occupations: physician, essayist

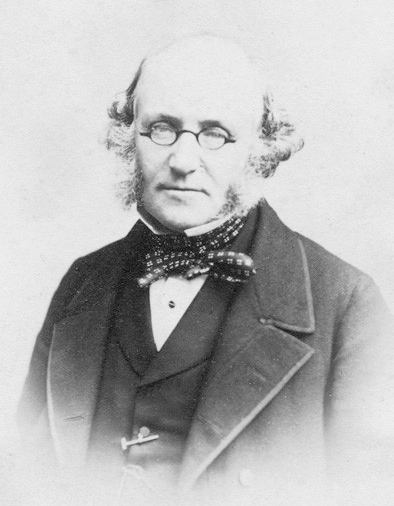
John Brown

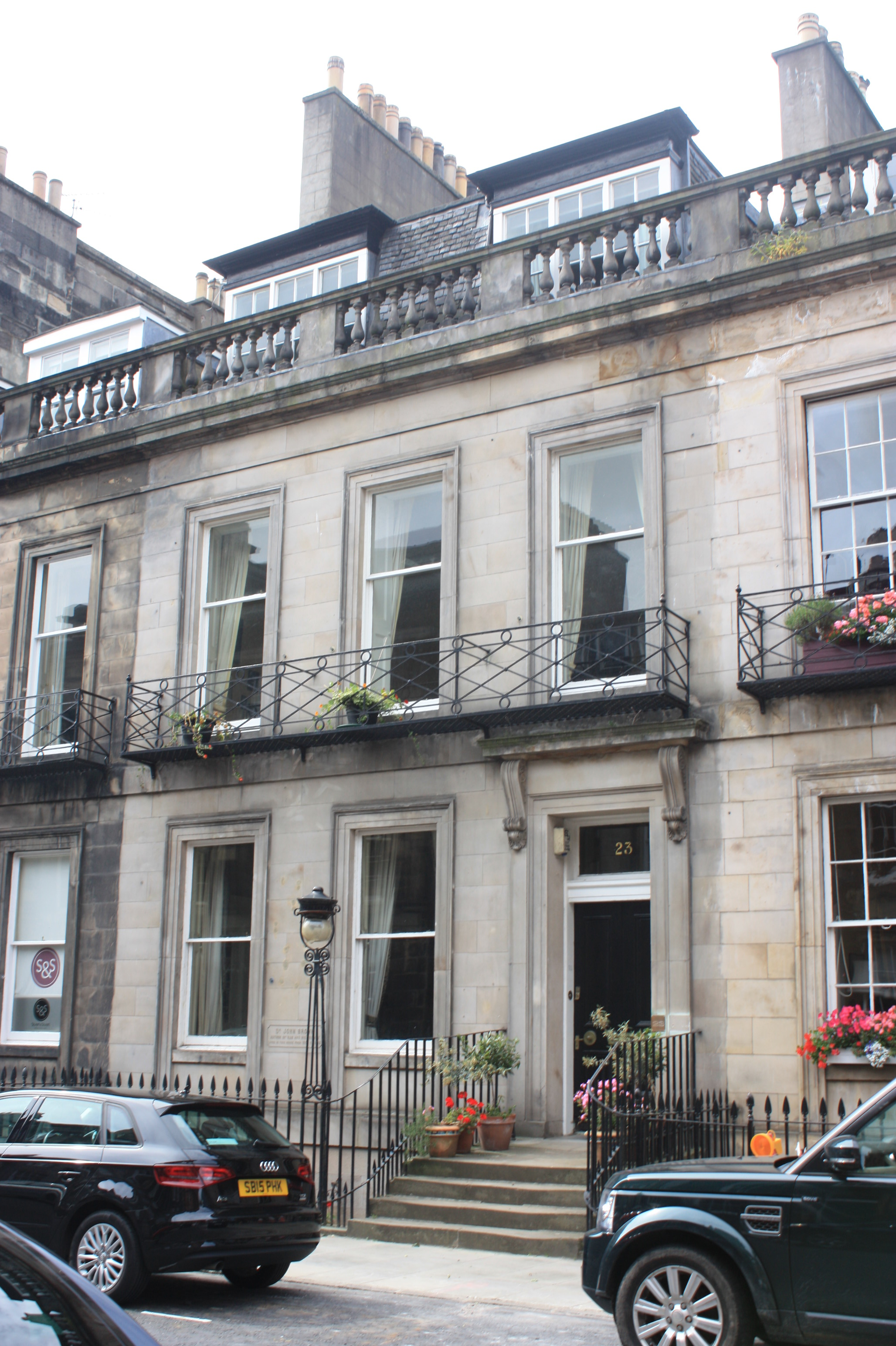
23 Rutland Street, Edinburgh

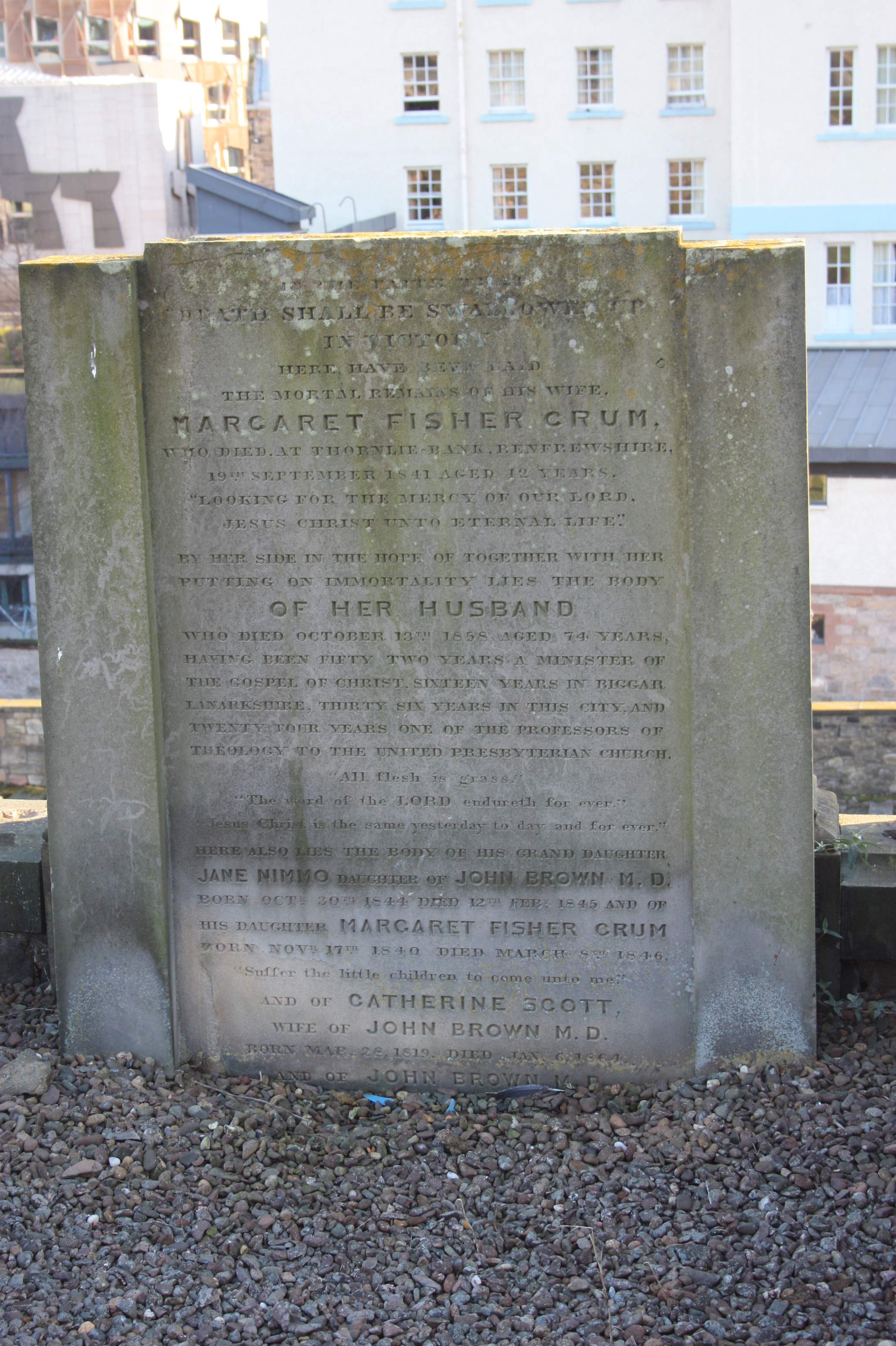
The grave of Dr John Brown, New Calton Cemetery, Edinburgh

John Brown FRSE FRCPE (22 September 1810 – 11 May 1882) was a Scottish physician and essayist known for his three-volume Horae Subsecivae (Leisure Hours, 1858), containing essays and papers on art, medical history and biography. Best remembered are his dog story "Rab and his Friends" (1859) and his essays "Pet Marjorie" (1863), on Marjorie Fleming, the ten-year-old prodigy and alleged "pet" of Walter Scott, "Our Dogs", "Minchmoor", and "The Enterkine". Brown was half-brother to the organic chemist Alexander Crum Brown.

== Life ==
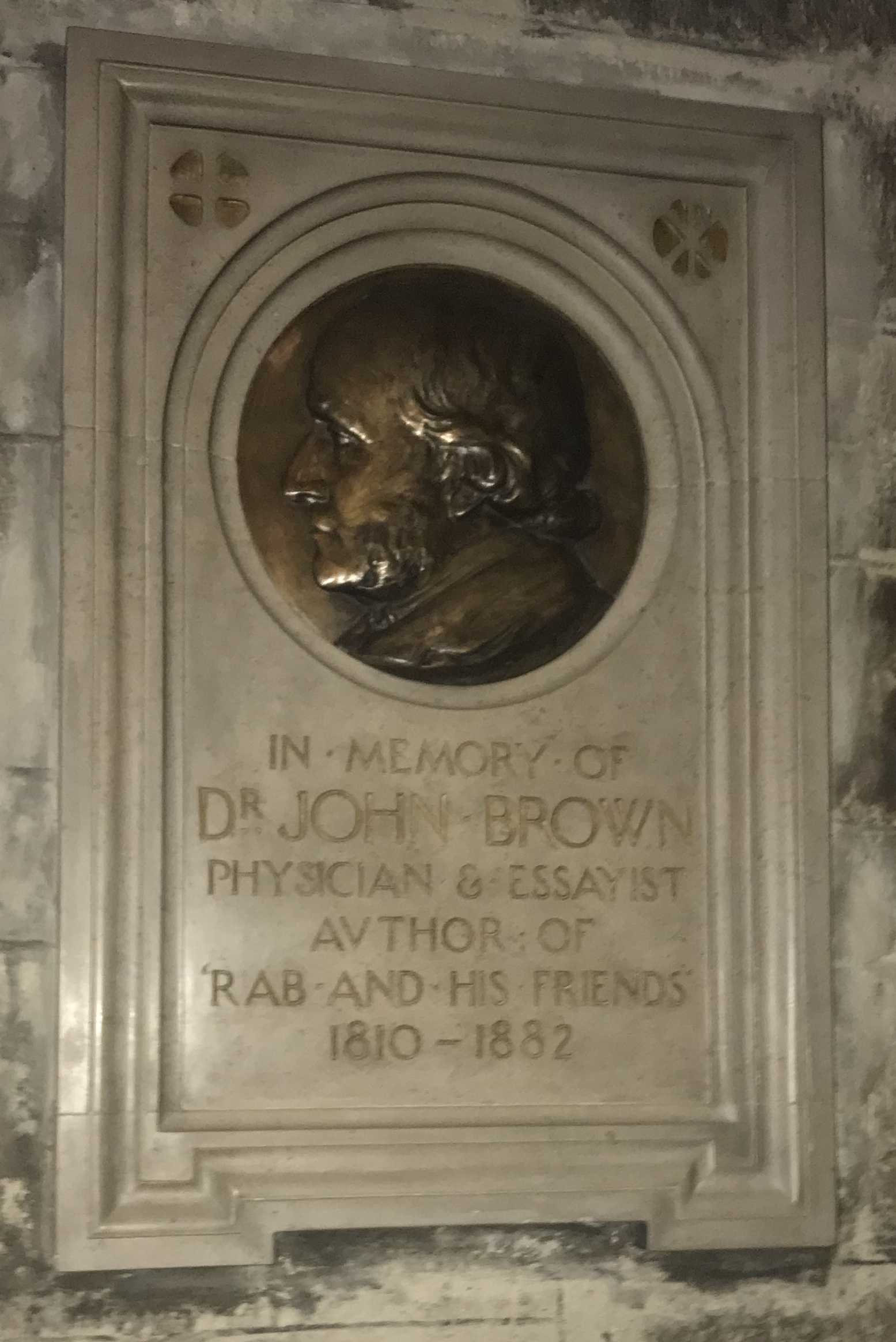
Memorial for Dr John Brown in St. Giles' Cathedral

Brown was born in Biggar, Scotland, the son of Jane (née Nimmo) and clergyman John Brown (1784–1858). His mother died when he was six years old.

Brown, who was descended from eminent Presbyterian clergy, was educated at the Edinburgh High School. In 1833, he graduated with an MD from the University of Edinburgh, and practised as a physician in the city. After qualifying, he was apprenticed to James Syme. Brown subsequently acquired a large medical practice in Edinburgh at a time when infectious diseases took a heavy toll of life.

Brown's house at 23 Rutland Street was the scene of many social gatherings. In 1840 he married Catherine Scott McKay and together they had three children; a daughter who died shortly after birth, another daughter, Helen, who was to marry Captain Alexander Laws, and a son "Jock" Brown. Helen Laws moved to Ireland and outlived her father. However, Jock was to survive into the 20th century and worked hard to pay tribute to his father, collecting all his letters, and working to erect a plaque on his house which remains to this day. In 1847, Brown became a Fellow of the Royal College of Physicians of Edinburgh, and for a while was Honorary Librarian. He held strong views on the inappropriateness of examinations for evaluating student progress and was unimpressed by the view that scientific advances were in patients' best interests.

Brown was the friend of many contemporaries, including Thackeray and Mark Twain. His reputation is based on the two volumes of essays, Horae Subsecivae (Leisure Hours) (1858, 1861), John Leech and Other Papers (1882), Rab and His Friends (1859), and Marjorie Fleming: a Sketch (1863) (generally called Pet Marjorie). His first writing was in response to a request for contributions to the notices of paintings exhibited by the Royal Scottish Academy. The editor of the Scotsman newspaper then asked him to write regularly for the paper. He was 48 years old when he published Rab and His Friends. His writings were philosophical, classical, artistic, medical, of rural life, the Jacobite Rebellion, notable characters, humble folk and canine friends. These were published as a collection in 1858 as Horæ Subsecivæ, which ran to many editions. The first volume deals mainly with the equipment and duties of a physician, the second with subjects outside his profession.

Brown was associated with several literary contemporaries, including William Makepeace Thackeray. He also encouraged the early writing of Henrietta Keddie, who later became a novelist and children's writer. Brown wrote a relatively small body of work, which included essays and stories noted for their treatment of animals, particularly dogs.

Brown suffered during the latter years of his life from attacks of melancholy. He died at home at 23 Rutland Street in Edinburgh, on 11 May 1882, and was buried in his father's plot in New Calton Cemetery. The grave lies on the western side on the edge of one of the terraces. The inscription to Brown and the base and are largely obscured, but it is confirmed by his mother's name above.

== Family ==
In 1840, Brown married Catherine Scott McKay (1819–1864).

== Publications ==
- The Life of Dr Henry Marshall.
- Pet Marjorie
- The Little Book of Children

== Memorials ==
In 1923 a plaque was erected to Brown in the south-west corner of St Giles Cathedral in Edinburgh. It was sculpted by Pilkington Jackson.
