= A Ball for Daisy =

Children's picture book by Chris Raschka

- Author: Chris Raschka
- Illustrator: Chris Raschka
- Cover artist: Chris Raschka
- Language: English
- Genre: Children's picture book
- Publisher: Schwartz & Wade
- Publication date: May 10, 2011
- Publication place: USA
- Media type: Print (Hardcover)
- Pages: 32
- ISBN: 978-0-375-85861-1
- OCLC: 649926186
- LC Class: PZ7.R1814 Bal 2011
- Followed by: Daisy Gets Lost

A Ball for Daisy is a 2011 children's wordless picture book written and illustrated by Chris Raschka. The book tells the story of a dog named Daisy, who has a beloved ball destroyed and then replaced. Raschka won the 2012 Caldecott Medal for his illustrations in the book. The creation of the book took years but was praised for its ability to evoke emotion in the reader. A sequel, Daisy Gets Lost, was released in 2013.

== Background and publication ==
Author and illustrator Chris Raschka first thought about the idea for A Ball for Daisy 10 years before writing it, after seeing how upset his son got after he lost a ball thanks to a dog. Prior to creating the book he sketched various combinations of balls and dogs. Raschka described the process of creating the book as a difficult one. He had wanted to write a wordless picture book so that "a child could read the book without knowing how to read.'' The challenge lay in conveying the emotions the way he wanted to, but without any words.

The book was published May 10, 2011 and was followed by a sequel, Daisy Gets Lost, in 2013.

== Plot ==
A Ball for Daisy is a wordless children's picture book that tells the story of a small white dog named Daisy and her favorite red ball. Daisy is so obsessed with the ball that she takes it everywhere with her, sleeps with it, and overall has to be near it constantly. As her owner takes Daisy out for a walk one day, her ball gets snatched by a brown dog wanting to play. Daisy tries her hardest to get the ball back, but the other dog insists on playing with it and accidentally pops it. Daisy's owner then throws the ball in the trash and takes Daisy home. For a while, Daisy acts distraught over her loss. Later, Daisy's owner takes her for another walk, and on the walk they see the same dog that popped Daisy's ball, but this time that dog has a shiny new blue ball. The other dog gives the blue ball to Daisy, which makes her very happy.

== Writing and illustrations ==
The story centers on an idea and theme that is relatable to for children and could help build emotional resiliency. Many reviewers commented on Raschka's strength in depicting emotions so well. He uses colors to help depict the changing moods in the story.

Raschka illustrated the book using watercolors. Several reviewers also commented on Raschka's skill with broad brushstrokes. The illustrations give the appearance of having been drawn without revision and combine watercolor and comic book drawing techniques. Its Caldecott win was part of a trend of wordless picture books being honored, which began with David Wiesner's honor book Free Fall and part of Rashka's ability to "take risks" with each of his books.

== Reception and awards ==
The book was well reviewed, gaining starred reviews from The Horn Book Magazine, which praised the book as "noteworthy for both its artistry and its child appeal"; Kirkus Reviews, which wrote of how "rarely, perhaps never, has so steep an emotional arc been drawn with such utter, winning simplicity"; and School Library Journal, which noted how it matched the illustrator's other work, "Raschka continues to experiment with what is essential to express the daily joys and tribulations of humans and animals." The book was a New York Times Best Seller and was named by it as one of the best books of 2011.

The book was awarded the 2012 Caldecott award. "Chris Raschka’s deceptively simple paintings of watercolor, gouache and ink explore universal themes of love and loss that permit thousands of possible variants", said Caldecott Medal Committee Chair Steven L. Herb. The Wall Street Journal agreed with its choice as a Caldecott Medal recipient. Raschka had never dreamed that he might win the Caldecott and was on his way to his studio when the committee called to tell him of his win.

Awards
Preceded by A Sick Day for Amos McGee	Caldecott Medal recipient 2012	Succeeded by This is Not My Hat
