= Book of Love (1990 film) =

1990 film by Robert Shaye

- Theatrical release poster
- Directed by: Robert Shaye
- Screenplay by: William Kotzwinkle
- Based on: Jack in the Box by William Kotzwinkle
- Produced by: Rachel Talalay
- Starring: Chris Young; Keith Coogan; Michael McKean
- Cinematography: Peter Deming
- Edited by: Terry Stokes
- Music by: Stanley Clarke
- Production company: New Line Cinema
- Distributed by: New Line Cinema
- Release date: October 1990
- Running time: 87 minutes
- Country: United States
- Language: English
- Budget: $4 million
- Box office: $1,382,259

Book of Love is a 1990 American romantic comedy film directed by New Line Cinema founder Robert Shaye. It is based on the autobiographical novel Jack in the Box by William Kotzwinkle (the novel's name was changed to Book of Love during this film's original release).

The film was originally PG-13, but subsequent DVD releases have been the R-rated Director's Cut (R for sexual content and language). It stars Chris Young, Keith Coogan, and John Cameron Mitchell.

== Plot ==
Jack Twiller (Michael McKean) gets greetings from a long-gone high-school girlfriend. This makes him open his school's yearbook - his "Book of Love". He remembers the old times, way back in the 1950s, when he was in his last year of high school (Chris Young) and his family just moved to the town. He hung out with geeky Paul Kane and tried to get the attention of Lily (Josie Bissett), who unfortunately was together with bully Angelo (Beau Dremann). He also finds himself attracted to Angelo's feisty sister Gina (Tricia Leigh Fisher).

== Cast ==
- Chris Young as Jack Twiller
- Michael McKean as Adult Jack Twiller
- Keith Coogan as Crutch Kane
- Aeryk Egan as Peanut Twiller
- Tricia Leigh Fisher as Gina Gabooch
- Josie Bissett as Lily
- John Cameron Mitchell as Floyd
- Danny Nucci as Spider Bombini
- Beau Dremann as Angelo Gabooch
- Jill Jaress as Mrs. Kitty Twiller
- John Achom as Mr. Joe Twiller
- Lewis Arquette as Mr. Malloy
- Lin Shaye as Mrs. Flynn
- Brent David Fraser as Meatball
- Brian Evans as Schank

== Created brother ==
In the book Jack in the Box, Jack Twiller's experiences are followed from elementary school to high school, while in his screenplay, William Kotzwinkle creates a younger brother, dividing these experiences between two separate characters.

== Filming locations ==
- Glendale, California
- Los Angeles, California
- Santa Monica, California
- South Pasadena, California

== Soundtrack ==
There was an original soundtrack released on January 16, 1991, but now it is very rare.

1. "Book of Love" - Ben E King & Bo Diddley ft. Doug Lazy
2. "The Great Pretender" - The Platters
3. "Fools Fall in Love" - The Drifters
4. "The Fool" - Sanford Clark
5. "Little Darlin'" - The Diamonds
6. "Sincerely" - The Moonglows
7. "Come Back My Love" - The Cardinals
8. "Hearts of Stone" - The Fontane Sisters
9. "What Can I Do" - Donnie Elbert
10. "Rip It Up" - Little Richard
11. "When Johnny Comes Marching Home"
12. "The Good, the Bad, and the Ugly Theme"
13. "Why Do Fools Fall in Love" - Frankie Lymon and the Teenagers
14. "School Days" - Chuck Berry
15. "Let the Good Times Roll" - Shirley & Lee

According to the end credits of the movie, these songs were also used:

- 1 Bourbon, 1 Scotch, 1 Beer (John Lee Hooker)
- Earth Angel (The Penguins)
- Be-Bop-a-Lula (Gene Vincent)
- Rocket 88 (Jackie Brenston and his Delta Cats)
- Hold me, thrill me, kiss me (performed by prom band)
- See ya later Alligator (performed by prom band)
- Graduation Day (The Four Freshmen)
- How can I tell her? (The Four Freshmen)

== Reception ==
For his performance in this film, John Cameron Mitchell was nominated for one Chicago Film Critics Association Awards in the category of "Most Promising Actor".

Rita Kempley from The Washington Post wrote: "Book of Love is a mild-mannered foray into the '50s, a modest coming of age comedy that is as thickly nostalgic as a yearbook. Though not strictly a trip back in time, it is a kind of Peggy Sue Got Married for the fellows, a chance to hum some old music and recall one's raging hormones." Peter Travers from Rolling Stone panned the film, stating: "What the world needs now is a lot of things, but I suspect that one of them is not another movie about growing up in the Fifties...William Kotzwinkle, author of the acclaimed novelization of E.T., adapted this script from his book Jack in the Box. But the film's virtues are, at best, modest. For Kotzwinkle and Robert Shaye — the New Line studio chief who is making a sincere but inauspicious debut as a director — the Fifties strike a personal chord".

On Rotten Tomatoes the film has three reviews, two positive and one negative.
