= Rab and his Friends =

Short story by John Brown

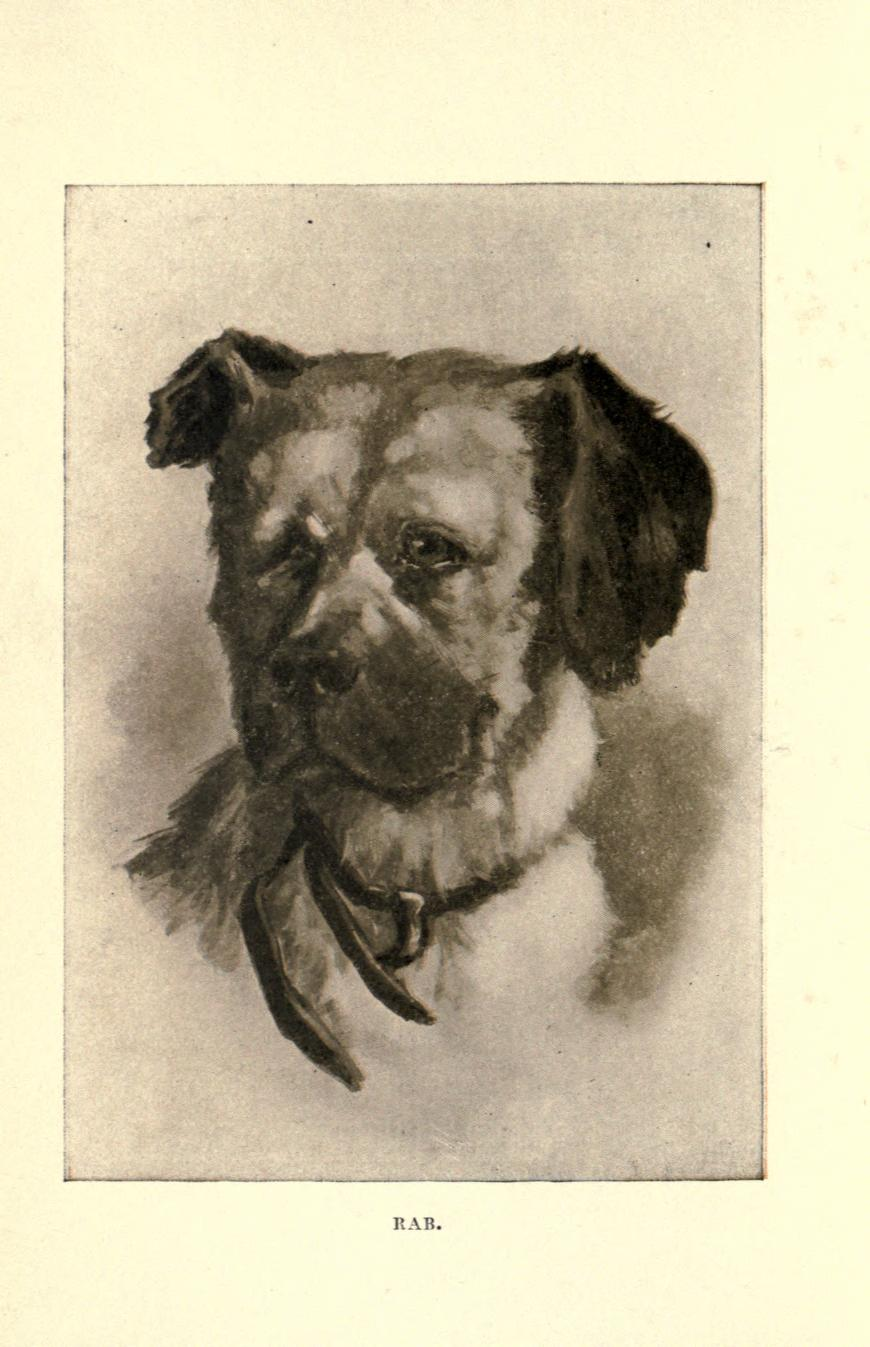
RAB.

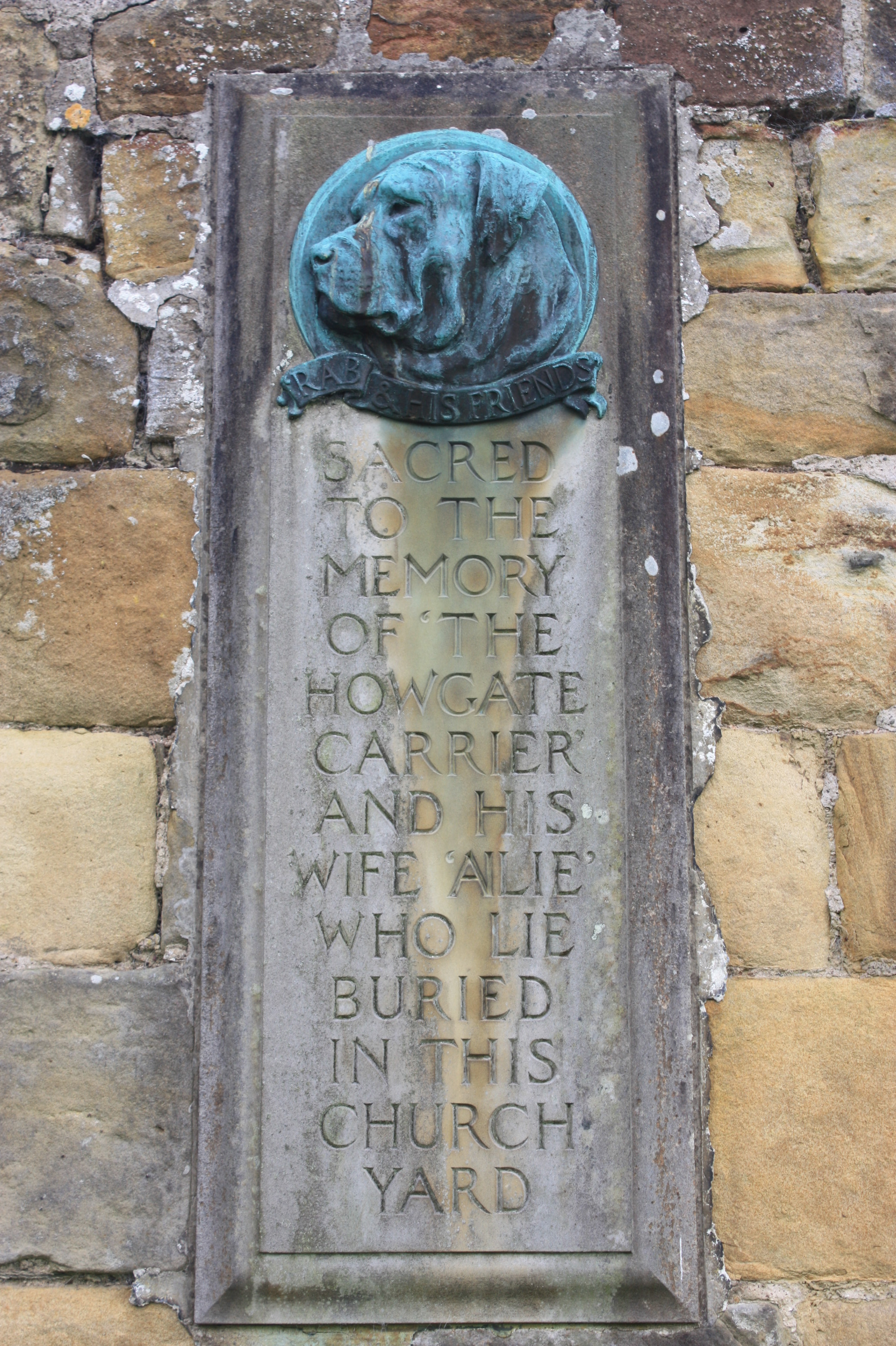
Monument to Rab and his Friends, St Mungo's Churchyard, Penicuik

"Rab and his Friends" (1859) is a short story by Scottish writer Dr John Brown. It was very popular in the 19th century and often considered John Brown's best, or at least most well known work. Even though short in length it was often published as a single volume with illustrations.

The title character 'Rab' - the Lowland Scots form of 'Rob' - is "a huge mastiff" dog. He is described as being "old, grey, brindled, as big as a Highland bull", as well as being extremely loyal and loving.

== Plot ==
"Rab and His Friends" is a simple story which includes an insight into how John Brown's teacher and employer, Doctor James Syme, taught and operated. The other main characters are Rab, a ferocious mastiff dog, his owner, James Noble, a carter or carrier by trade, and the carter's ailing wife Ailie. Set in Edinburgh in the 1830s, the story begins with a fight between Rab and a Bull Terrier which Brown, the narrator, watches as a teenage boy. Six years later, Brown is a medical student at Minto House Hospital and has maintained a friendship with Rab and James, the laconic carrier. One day, James arrives at the hospital with his wife Allie, who is found to have advanced breast cancer. Following an operation, Allie dies, attended by James and Rab. Not long after Allie's funeral, James dies too, and the carrier's business is sold, along with James's horse and dog. A chance meeting between Brown and the new owner reveals that Rab the dog had to be killed, because he wouldn't let anybody near the horse out of loyalty to James. The story ends with the faithful dog's funeral.
