= Daisy Gets Lost =

2013 children's book by Chris Raschka

- Author: Chris Raschka
- Illustrator: Chris Raschka
- Cover artist: Chris Raschka
- Language: English
- Genre: Children's picture book
- Published: 2013 (Schwartz & Wade Books)
- Publication place: USA
- Media type: Print (paperback)
- Pages: 32 (unpaginated)
- ISBN: 9780449817414
- OCLC: 823927609
- Preceded by: A Ball for Daisy

Daisy Gets Lost is a 2013 children's picture book by Chris Raschka. It is a sequel of the 2011 book A Ball for Daisy and is about Daisy chasing a squirrel, becoming lost in a forest, but then being reunited with her owner.

== Reception ==
In a starred review of Daisy Gets Lost Publishers Weekly wrote "Raschka again demonstrates his gift for visually capturing a sweeping range of feeling and emotion, from the gleam in the squirrel’s eye to Daisy’s wide-eyed alarm as she realizes her predicament." Martha Parravano reviewing the book for The Horn Book Magazine suggested it be considered for the Caldecott Medal.

Daisy Gets Lost has also been reviewed by Kirkus Reviews, Common Sense Media, The Bulletin of the Center for Children's Books, School Library Journal, and Booklist.
