= John Reynolds Gardiner =

American novelist

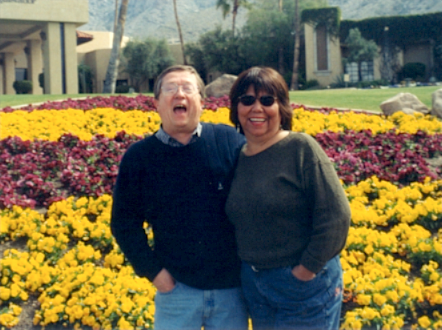
- Born: December 6, 1944; Los Angeles, California
- Died: March 4, 2006 (aged 61); Anaheim, California
- Resting place: Angelus-Rosedale Cemetery, West Adams, California
- Education: UCLA
- Occupation: Novelist
- Writing career
- Genre: Children's books
- Website: www.johnreynoldsgardiner.com

John Reynolds Gardiner (December 6, 1944 – March 4, 2006) was an American writer best known for writing the book Stone Fox.

== Personal life ==
Born in Los Angeles, California, he was a rebellious boy whose teachers believed he would never get anywhere in life. He earned his master's degree from University of California, Los Angeles. He was an engineer before working on his first and best-known children's book, Stone Fox, which, at the time of his death in 2006, had sold four million copies. Always creative, in his younger years he ran Num Num Novelties, home to such originals as the aquarium tie. He lived in West Germany, El Salvador, Mexico, Italy, Ireland, and Idaho where he heard a local legend that inspired Stone Fox. He took a special class on screenplay and wrote Stone Fox as a movie, but a producer told him to publish it into a novel. Gardiner also edited children's stories for television. He lived out his final years with his wife, Gloria, in California and died of complications from pancreatitis in Anaheim, California.

== Works ==
Novels

- Stone Fox (1980) ISBN 0-06-440132-4
- Top Secret (also published as The Strange Thing That Happened to Allen Brewster) (1984) ISBN 0-316-30363-1
- General Butterfingers (1993) ISBN 0-14-036355-6
- How to Live a Life That's Not Boring (2004) ISBN 0-9753162-0-6

Filmography

- Stone Fox (1987 TV film) (book)
