= Kashtanka =

- Short story by Anton Chekhov
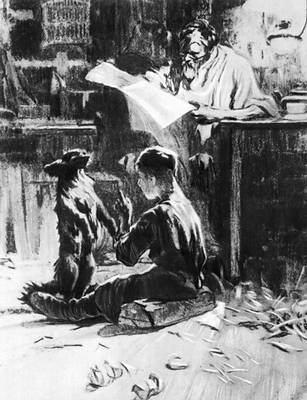
- Kashtanka, Fedyushka and Luka Alexandrovich; 1903 illustration by Dmitry Kardovsky
- Original title: Каштанка
- Country: Russia
- Language: Russian

Publication
- Published in: Novoye Vremya
- Publication date: 25 December 1887 (old style)

"Kashtanka" (Russian: Каштанка) (Note: The name refers to dog's colour: 'kashtan' (каштан) is 'chestnut' in Russian) is an 1887 short story by Anton Chekhov. It follows the adventures, mostly in the circus, of a mongrel dog of the same name. The story was adapted into several films.

== Publication ==
The story was first published in Novoye Vremya's No. 4248, 25 December (old style) 1887 issue, originally under the title "In Learned Society" (В учёном обществе; V uchyonom obschestve).

Revised by the author, divided into seven chapters and under the new title, it came out as a separate edition in Saint Petersburg in 1892 and enjoyed six re-issues in 1893–1899. Chekhov included it in Volume 4 of his Collected Works, published by Adolf Marks in 1899–1901. In 1903 the story came out illustrated by Dmitry Kardovsky and in such form continued to be re-issued well into the end of the 20th century.

== Background ==
There were at least two persons who claimed to have prompted Chekhov the original idea. One of them was Nikolai Leykin: of that Viktor Bilibin informed the author in a 7 December 1887 letter (Chekhov apparently left the claim uncommented). Another, the circus performer and animal trainer Vladimir L. Durov (1863–1934) in his 1927 book "My Animals" maintained that it was him who once told Chekhov the real life story about a dog named Kashtanka who'd performed with his troupe.

== Plot ==
Chapter 1. Misbehaviour. Kashtanka, a young foxey-looking mongrel belonging to a carpenter drunkard named Luka Alexandrovich, gets lost through her own 'improper behaviour', frightened by a military band on the street. Hungry and desperate, ("If she had been a human being, she would have certainly thought, "No, it is impossible to live like this! I must shoot myself!"), she huddles up by the entrance to some unfamiliar house.

Chapter 2. A Mysterious Stranger. A stranger comes out, feels sorry for the lost dog and, delighted with her funny looks, takes her to his place where he treats her to a good dinner. Upon inspection, she finds the place poor and ugly (nothing "besides the easy-chairs, the sofa, the lamps, and the rugs") next to her masters' apartments, rich with all manner of rubbish. On the plus side, the host gives her not a single kick, which feels like a novelty. Finally, she goes to sleep, dreaming nostalgically of how Luka's son Fedyushka used to lovingly 'play' with her by way of using her "as a bell, that is, shake her violently by the tail so that she squealed and barked", as well as giving her a piece of meat to swallow and then "with a loud laugh, pulling it back again from her stomach," by a thread he'd fixed it with.

Chapter 3. New and Very Agreeable Acquaintances. In the morning, Kashtanka meets (and, after a bout of initial hostility, befriends) her neighbours: a gander named Ivan Ivanovich, who talks much nonsense, and the old white tomcat Fyodor Timofeyitch, a lazy creature with a highly skeptical mindset. From her new master, she receives her new name, Tyotka (Auntie).

Chapter 4. Marvels on a Hurdle. The trio, completed by the pig Khavronya Ivanovna, and supervised by their trainer, starts to perform the most wonderful tricks, like bell-ringing, pistol-shooting, and, most importantly, climbing atop one another to form what's known in their master's parlance as the Egyptian Pyramid. Kashtanka is intrigued and delighted by the show. The next night sees her moving into the gander and the cat's apartment.

Chapter 5. "Talent! Talent!" A month passes, and Tyotka gets used to her new life, full of good dinners and exhausting but joyful training sessions during which she walks on hind legs, catches sugar, dances and 'sings' (by way of accompanying music by howling). Finally, she becomes Fyodor Timofeyitch's sub in the Egyptian Pyramid. The master is delighted with Tyotka's progress. Still, every evening brings her a whiff of sadness, as she continues to dream wistfully of her wonderful past with the rude and silly carpenter and his sadistically-minded little boy.

Chapter 6. An Uneasy Night. A tragedy strikes: Ivan Ivanovich dies. It transpires that a horse had accidentally stepped upon him earlier in the day. Everybody is greatly distressed; thoughts of imminent death creep into both the dog's and the cat's heads.

External videos
- Kashtanka, the 1952 Soviet animation by Mikhail Tsekhanovsky (31 min)

Chapter 7. An Unsuccessful Début. Several days pass. The team leaves the house for a performance in which Kashtanka is, for the first time, substituting the late Ivan Ivanovich at the base of the Egyptian Pyramid. The master is nervous and full of dark premonitions. The show starts well: Kashtanka performs some tricks, then prepares to do the singing and dancing routine, then... "Look out, dad, that's our Kahtanka!" she hears Fedyushka's voice in the audience. Filled with joy, she rushes off-stage, to greet her old family. Half an hour later she's on the street with them, happy to return to her good old life of hunger, full of abuse and drunken Luka's eloquence, mostly in the form of one, oft-repeated observation: "You, Kashtanka, are an insect of a creature, and nothing else. Beside a man, you are much the same as a joiner beside a cabinetmaker."

== Reception ==
The reaction to the story was extremely warm, but several reviewers expressed their dissatisfaction with its finale. In an 8 January 1888 letter Yakov Polonsky wrote to Chekhov: "For a New Year Day you treated us with two fine stories, "Kashtanka" and "The Easter Tale" (Note: In later editions known as "A Story Without a Title", "Без Названия") and I am happy to inform you that everybody here are delighted with them.... It's just that it seemed to me that "Kashtanka"'s final scene bears the mark of either tiredness or haste. It certainly looks is if something in it is missing."

== Adaptations ==
- Kashtanka (1926 film) Russian black and white film directed by Olga Preobrazhenskaya
- ru:Каштанка (мультфильм, 1952)
- ru:Каштанка (фильм) (1975)
- ru:Каштанка (мультфильм, 2004)
