= Stone Fox =

1980 children's novella by John Reynolds Gardiner

- First edition
- Author: John Reynolds Gardiner
- Illustrator: Marcia Sewall
- Language: English
- Genre: Children's novellas
- Published: 1980 Harper & Row
- Publication place: United States
- Media type: Print (Paperback)
- Pages: 96
- ISBN: 0-06-440132-4
- OCLC: 9333615
- Dewey Decimal: Fic
- LC Class: MICS 2006/42188 (P)

Stone Fox is a children's novella by John Reynolds Gardiner. It is the first and best known of Gardiner's books. Stone Fox was acclaimed and popular when it was published in 1980. It sold three million copies and was turned into a television movie starring Buddy Ebsen, Joey Cramer, and Gordon Tootoosis and directed by Harvey Hart in 1987. It was named a New York Times Notable Book of the Year for 1980 (Nov. 30, 1980. p. BR4), and was included in 100 Best Books for Children by Anita Silvey.

The book centers on a boy named Willy who enters a dog sled race in order to win $500 to pay back the taxes on his grandfather's farm. It is written in simple prose and is set at an indeterminate time in the American Old West. The book was inspired by a Rocky Mountain legend that Gardiner heard when he visited Idaho. Stone Fox was originally intended as a screenplay but became a book at the suggestion of a producer.

== Plot summary ==
Ten-year-old Willy lives in Jackson, Wyoming in the 1880s on a potato farm with his grandfather and his dog Searchlight. During a harsh winter, his grandfather falls ill and after an audit of the potato farm, the tax collector determines that he owes $500 in unpaid taxes. Willy and Searchlight enter the National Dogsled Race (held each year in Jackson), believing they can beat the other racers and win the $500 prize money to help save the farm. One of Willy's competitors is Stone Fox, an undefeated racer who uses his winnings to buy land for his Native American tribe. Stone Fox is vehemently anti-settler and resents the loss of tribal property, and has never been known to speak a word to a white person.

As the race ends, Willy is in the lead but Searchlight's heart explodes from constant pressure before they reach the finish line. Seeing Willy crying over his loss, Stone Fox draws a line in the snow and unholsters his pistol to stop the other racers, then speaks his first words to the whites: "Anyone crosses this line — I shoot." Stone Fox then permits Willy to carry Searchlight's body across the finish line, having learned the possibility of peaceful coexistence between a native American and a white man.

== Characters ==
- Little Willy: the protagonist of the book, he lives with his grandfather in a potato farm in Jackson, Wyoming.
- Searchlight: Willy's loyal black dog who faithfully helps Willy in the race until her heart explodes.
- Grandfather: Willy's grandfather, who is bedridden during much of the story.
- Doc Smith: the town's only doctor and a close friend to Willy and Grandfather.
- Stone Fox: a Native American dogsled racer resentful of white seizure of his people's land. He never speaks to white people and has never lost a race, using the prize money he wins from races towards buying Native farmland back.
- Mr. Clifford Snyder: the local tax collector.
- Mr. Foster: the bank president who helps Willy with the paper work.
- Lester: a kind store clerk who runs Lester's general store.
- Dusty the Drunk: the town drunkard who tells Willy of Stone Fox.

== Film ==
Stone Fox is a 1987 television film adaptation of the book. The film premiered on March 30, 1987 on NBC and stars Buddy Ebsen (as Grandpa), Joey Cramer (as Willy), Gordon Tootoosis (as Stone Fox), and Belinda Montgomery (as Doc Smith). The film was produced by Allarcom Limited and Taft Broadcasting in association with Hanna-Barbera, and was directed by Harvey Hart.

The plot in the movie is slightly different from the book. Rather than losing the desire to live, Grandpa suffers a stroke, and Willy has to win the race to save his Grandpa's cattle ranch. Stone Fox also leaves Willy a puppy after the death of Searchlight, who is named "Morgan" in the film. The movie was filmed at Fort Edmonton Park, Fox Drive and Whitemud Drive in Alberta, Canada.
