= Chris Raschka =

American writer

- Raschka in 2026
- Born: Christopher Raschka; Huntingdon, Pennsylvania, U.S.
- Occupations: Author, artist and illustrator

Chris Raschka is an American illustrator, writer, and violist. He has contributed to children's literature as a children's illustrator.

== Early life and education ==
Raschka was born in Huntingdon, Pennsylvania. Though he grew up in suburban Chicago, Illinois, he spent part of his childhood in Austria, his mother's homeland.

He is a graduate of St. Olaf College.

== Career and awards ==
Yo! Yes? was a Caldecott Honor Book in 1994, but Raschka may be most famous for his Hello, Goodbye Window, winner of the 2006 Caldecott Medal, and his book A Ball for Daisy, which won the 2012 Caldecott Medal.

He was the U.S. nominee for the biennial, international Hans Christian Andersen Medal in 2012.

Raschka is the author and illustrator of Charlie Parker Played Be Bop, an introduction to the saxophone player and composer Charlie Parker (Scholastic, 1997).

== Selected works ==
- Another Important Book (illustrator)
- Arlene Sardine
- A Ball for Daisy
- The Blushful Hippopotamus
- Can't Sleep
- Charlie Parker Played Be Bop
- Circle Time (shorts for Playhouse Disney)
- Daisy Gets Lost
- Elizabeth Imagined an Iceberg
- Everyone Can Learn to Ride a Bicycle
- Farmy Farm
- Fishing in the Air (illustrator)
- Five for a Little One
- A Foot in the Mouth (illustrator)
- The Genie in the Jar (illustrator)
- Good Sports: Rhymes about Running, Jumping, Throwing, and More (illustrator)
- Granny Torrelli Makes Soup (illustrator)
- Grump Groan Growl (illustrator)
- Happy to Be Nappy (illustrator)
- The Hello, Goodbye Window (illustrator)
- Hip Hop Dog (author)
- Home at Last (children's book)|Home at Last (illustrator)
- If You Were a Dog
- John Coltrane's Giant Steps
- A Kick in the Head (illustrator)
- Little Black Crow
- Little Tree (illustrator)
- Moosey Moose
- Mysterious Thelonious
- Peter and the Wolf (adaptor, illustrator)
- A Poke in the I (illustrator)
- The Purple Balloon
- Reading Picture Books with Children: How to Shake Up Storytime and Get Kids Talking about What They See, by Megan Dowd Lambert, Charlesbridge, 2015.
- Ring! Yo?
- Seriously, Norman
- Side by Side : A Celebration of Dads
- Simple Gifts: A Shaker Hymn
- Talk To Me About the Alphabet
- Whaley Whale
- Why Did the Chicken Cross the Road? (illustrator)
- Wormy Worm
- Yo! Yes?
