= Death in children's literature =

Death in children's literature refers to how death, dying, and grief are represented in texts for children and young adults. Its portrayal has changed over time, reflecting shifts in cultural attitudes toward childhood, morality, and emotional development. Early works often treated death as a natural or moralized part of life, while twentieth-century literature frequently avoided direct discussion of death. Since the mid-twentieth century, children's literature has increasingly presented death more directly and focuses more on targeting emotional responses such as grief and remembrance. Contemporary and global approaches commonly emphasize empathy and use narrative and visual elements to help young readers better understand death and loss.

== Early history ==
Until around the 17th century, there was very little literature written specifically for children. Oral storytelling and music accepted death as a matter-of-fact for both children and adults alike. Since mortality rates for children were much higher then, the subject was not taboo. The restoration of life, life as a preparation for death, death as a form of sleep, immortality, animals sacrificing themselves for humans, love as a conqueror of death, and inanimate objects that come to life were all common themes.

Examples of the changing approach to death include: The Juniper Tree by the Brothers Grimm, in which a boy is murdered by his stepmother, but comes back as a bird and kills the stepmother. The bird then turns back into a boy and is reunited with his father and sister. The stepmother, though, does not come back to life. As conceptions of childhood became increasingly idealized, literature began to distance children from the reality of death, often using fantasy or moral framing to soften or deny its finality.

=== Introduction of morality lesson ===
Published between 1889 and 1913, Andrew Lang's Fairy Books series is another early example that contains numerous curated fairy tales and folklore with references to death. In one instance, the reader is encouraged to live a good or "perfect" life in order to go to Heaven after death. In others, both animals and humans gain immortality. The collection of fairy tales introduces a longstanding theme that bad people are supposed to stay dead and good, loving people should return to life. A more widespread example is Sleeping Beauty, in which a character's death is just a sleep that is conquered by love. These themes are also seen in the Slavic story Firebird and the retold versions of Le Morte d'Arthur by William Caxton and Robin Hood by Howard Pyle.

As faith is also a common factor in discussions and finding meaning in life and death, it is a frequent theme in early literary examples. A well-known example is John Bunyan's Pilgrim's Progress, originally written for children. Life is portrayed as a journey of faith that will end at the gates of heaven. Those having lived a good (in this case Christian) life, enter. Exemplified in Hans Christian Andersen's original Little Mermaid, the character must endure a journey, a form of suffering, and ultimately death for others, after which she is rewarded with an immortal soul. Aesop's Fables also contain such references both in the versions written exclusively for adults and those for both children and adults.

=== Early humor and normalization of death ===
Mark Twain's "The Story of the Bad Little Boy" and "The Story of the Good Little Boy" satirize Christian morality tales written for children; the former detailing the life of a boy who cheats, steals, and lies, but ultimately grows up to be rich and successful without any repercussions for his actions, while the latter involves a boy who follows the morals in his "Sunday-school books" and receives unintended consequences for his good behavior, culminating in his untimely demise in a nitroglycerin-induced explosion along with "fourteen or fifteen dogs".

In Alice's Adventures in Wonderland, she jokes that if she falls and dies, she will be "quite a story back home". There is also the Mother Goose rhyme in which Humpty Dumpty falls and dies, because he is an egg that breaks and can not be re-built.

=== Early didactic interpretations ===
Later this somewhat philosophical or spiritual approach would be replaced by a more scientific approach wherein the illusion of death as a form of sleep is denied and the decomposition of bodies is discussed. This viewpoint may have been popularized by Puritan beliefs that death is a punishment for sin. In favor of this argument would be such texts as James Janeway's nonfiction A Token for Children: An Exact Account of the Conversion, Holy and Exemplary Lives and Joyful Deaths of Several Young Children. While life is still shown as fragile, emphasis is placed on the importance of salvation rather than on fantastical alternatives of rebirth as animals, immortality and such. Louisa May Alcott's well-known Little Women alludes to the story of John Bunyan's Pilgrim's Progress while she concurrently shows the characters, including one who dies, as engaged and representative of a symbolic journey within the home. Even within this narrative, shifting attitudes are evident, as death begins to be treated less as an expected part of life and more as a disruptive event.

== 20th century to present ==
=== Death as narrative experience ===
Into the 20th century, death becomes more of a plot device, such as in Frances Hodgson Burnett's A Little Princess and The Secret Garden. In A Little Princess, Sarah Crewe's parents die while she is in England and, as a result, becomes maid. Mary Lennox's parents are killed and she is sent to live with her uncle, who is still grieving for his wife and unwilling to even meet his son for fear that he will die as well. In Bambi, the focal point of the story is the title character's survival through his mother's sacrifice. In these examples, death is treated much more subtly, alluded to as something that happened previously, not something to discuss frankly with children.

In 1958, Margaret Wise Brown published The Dead Bird, a simple picture book in which children find a dead bird, that scholars say "broke publishing ground." Just a few years later, children would hear about the deaths in the Vietnam War and the various political assassinations displayed on the news and in the media. Historical events such as these may have had an effect on why some parents and educators began to agree that death is a "fact of life" and is acceptable for children to be introduced to. At the same time, the cold, impersonal treatment of death begins to disappear in favor of the previous themes of leading a good life, love overcoming death, immortality, inanimate objects having or obtaining life, sacrificing one's life for others, and other such moral or "uplifting" themes. Still, even in the death-related books published in the 1970s and 1980s, feelings about death are discussed with children only 35% of the time and comfort was slightly more likely to be physical (54%) than verbal (48%).

Death still continued to be used as humor and the subject of jokes, such as in the various versions of The Girl with the Green Ribbon, originally published in 1984, in which a young girl wears a green ribbon around her neck and a young boy asks her about it, but she puts him off. The two grow up together and eventually marry with the boy/man often asking her about the ribbon, but she continues to disregard the subject as "not important" or "not the right time". Finally when they are very old, she consents to have him untie the ribbon, and her head falls off.

=== Death as meaning making ===
The 20th-century offered many contemporary examples of death in children's literature, especially centering death as a key moment or plot-driver of the book. In The Giving Tree by Shel Silverstein, a tree sacrifices itself for a boy it loves. Then later, the boy returns as an old man to the tree stump and the two comfort each other. In Charlotte's Web by E.B. White, the pig Wilbur is afraid of death and the spider, Charlotte, spends her life creating messages in her web in order to save him. When she dies, "she lives on through her 500 offspring" and through the love of Wilbur. In C.S. Lewis's The Lion, the Witch, and the Wardrobe, an allegory to the Christian belief in Jesus, the lion Aslan sacrifices himself for the Pevensie children and later resurrects in time to vanquish the White Witch. In Natalie Babbitt's Tuck Everlasting, the Tucks have the fountain of eternal youth, but Winnie Foster chooses not to partake in this "life without death". Katherine Paterson's character Jess in Bridge to Terabithia is confused over the accidental death of his friend, Leslie. In A Taste of Blackberries by Doris Buchanan Smith, a child dies from an allergic reaction. In Admission to the Feast by Gunnel Beckman, a young character dies of cancer. In The Tenth Good Thing about Barney by Judith Viorst, the last good thing about the deceased cat, Barney, is that his decaying body helps the flowers to grow – a sort of "natural immortality".

=== Animals and death ===
The death of animals with or without human personalities is a popular way to introduce the topic to younger children. The death of an animal or inanimate object such as a plant made up 2% of the deaths in literature for children ages three to eight written in the 1970s and 1980s. In Hemery's Not Just a Fish, a young girl's fish dies and the girl deals with both her grief and the sympathy or disregard of others. This book reflects a new trend that exists in society: adults disregard for, or ignorance of, the grief of children. In Tough Boris by Mem Fox, a character shown previously as a gruff, fearless pirate is grief-stricken when his parrot dies. In Viorst's The Tenth Good Thing About Barney, a child is challenged to think of good things about a lost pet named Barney, while he and his family prepare for memorial activities. The use of animals allows the authors to broach the subject of replacing a loved one, such as in Charlotte's Web when Charlotte's memory lives on through her children. More examples are available in The Yearling by Marjorie Kinnan Rawlings, The Black Stallion by Walter Farley, Old Yeller by Fred Gipson and Where the Red Fern Grows by Wilson Rawls. One hypothesis for shielding children from death is that with the advent of modern medicine and changing attitudes about family, death is more removed from our lives than ever before. For example, in Zolotow's My Grandson Lew, a mother must admit to her six-year-old son that his grandfather and namesake has died and she did not tell him.

=== Realistic approach ===
While many examples retain earlier thematic elements, there are also more direct and information approaches to death available for children, particularly in educational materials,They're Part of the Family: Barklay and Eve Talk to Children About Pet Loss and Saying Goodbye to Your Pet: Children Can Learn to Cope with Grief.

Beyond individual examples, research shows that these informational approaches reflect wider trends in how death is presented to children. A study of 110 books written in the 1970s and 1980s for children ages 3 to 8 concluded that 85% were fiction, but in 80% of the books, the information about death was considered correct and death was presented as final. In only 28% of the books was the death considered an inevitability, and in the 72% that included physical details of death, burial was most frequently mentioned. After that, the category of items most likely to be mentioned (in order) were the dead body, a complete lack of physical details, the casket, and the funeral home. Other identifiers such as the headstone, organ donation, morgue, coroner, death records and/or laws, the grave or cemetery, embalming and autopsy, and related themes were rarely, if ever, mentioned.

While "life after death" is only the subject of 31% of the books written for 3 to 8 year-olds that included death between 1970 and 1989, the focus of ongoing memory as a method of immortality is seen in many texts, such as The Tenth Good Thing About Barney, mentioned above. In Dusty Was My Friend by Andrea Clardy, a boy dies in an auto accident and the family shares their experiences and memories in order to continue with life. In Mick Harte Was Here by Barbara Park, a girl loses her brother to a bicycle accident because he did not have a helmet, and so she makes it her mission to remind people to wear helmets. In Badger's Parting Gifts, by Susan Varley, an old badger knows he will die and is concerned with giving his friends special memories to remember him.

=== Trends in death representation ===
Since the 1960s, literature for children as a whole has become increasingly more realistic and oriented around actual problems, often involving sex, drugs, abortion, death, racism, and divorce. This trend extended to death as a topic. For example, John Gunther's Death Be Not Proud is more realistic than many of the death-related texts written prior. The best-selling memoir details the story of seventeen-year-old Johnny Gunther died from a rare brain tumor. Johnny's father and author of the novel, details his exhaustive time looking for therapeutic options during his son's illness.

However, some studies have shown that there are gender factors affecting how the characters react to death and the experiences they have. According to the article Who Dies and Who Cries, by Moore and Mae, males are more likely to show no visible signs of grief while females are more likely to express grief, particularly by crying. However males are slightly more likely to show anger and both are equally likely to socially withdraw at first. Also, the reactions to long-term grief are less likely to be shown in all cases. This can be seen in the more graphic details of deaths often depicted in texts aimed at males such as in My Brother Sam is Dead by James Lincoln Collier and Christopher Collier.

Not only are the responses to death not even, neither are the subjects of death. In the literature for children ages 3 to 8 written in the 1970s and 1980s, where someone died, 51% of the deaths were adults, 28% were animals or plants and only 9% were children (six books). Of the adults who died, 91% were "grandparent age" and 9% were "parent age". However, when children died they were more likely to be elementary school age (67%) than high school age (33%). Of the deaths described, 74% were relatives, versus 21% who were non-relatives. The gender of the person dying was about even. Often, the place or cause of death is not mentioned (42% and 49% respectively). Though it is estimated that at least half of actual deaths occur at a hospital or nursing home, hospitals were the location for only 12% of deaths in the studied books. Diseases such as heart disease or pneumonia, accidents and old age were the most likely causes, while seasonal changes, suicide and war accounted for three deaths.

== 21st century and contemporary trends ==
=== Contemporary approaches ===
Into the 21st century, contemporary children’s literature increasingly presents death as a topic that can be addressed directly, with an emphasis on emotional processing, communication, and developmental understanding. While adults often attempt to shield children from discussions of death, research indicates that children are frequently exposed to death through personal experiences, media, and broader societal contexts, and are capable of understanding its core concepts from an early age.

Recent studies emphasize the role of children’s literature as a tool for conversations about death and bereavement. Storybooks are frequently used by parents, caregivers, and educators to introduce complex ideas in a way that aligns with children’s cognitive and emotional development, providing language and narrative frameworks through which children can process loss. For example, books like as Everett Anderson’s Goodbye (1998) and The Sound of the Sea (2006) depict children grappling with the death of a parent, showing a range of emotional responses and coping processes, including sadness, confusion, and gradual adjustment.

A significant feature of contemporary texts is their focus on grief as an ongoing emotional experience rather than a single event. Many books highlight coping strategies such as remembrance, sharing memories, and maintaining emotional connections with the deceased, reflecting a broader shift toward supporting children’s psychological adjustment to loss. At the same time, research has found that many texts continue to rely on euphemistic or symbolic language. This includes references to sleep or journeys, which can create confusion for children if not accompanied by clear explanations. Despite this, a growing number of contemporary books emphasize open communication within families and provide opportunities for children to ask questions, express emotions, and develop a clearer understanding of death as irreversible and universal. Works such as What is Goodbye? (2004) and Always My Brother (2009) portray sibling loss and emphasize the importance of expressing emotions and sustaining family bonds after death.

=== Cancer in children's literature ===
Cancer has become a significant subject in contemporary children’s and young adult literature, often used to explore themes of grief, identity, and emotional development. These narratives depict both the physical realities of illness and its psychological and social impact on individuals and their families. In recent decades, cancer narratives have gained widespread popularity, with commercially successful titles such as The Fault in Our Stars and My Sister’s Keeper reaching large audiences and focusing on adolescent experiences of diagnosis, treatment, and loss.

Patrick Ness’s A Monster Calls provides a notable example of how cancer is represented in contemporary children's literature. The novel follows a young boy coping with his mother’s terminal cancer diagnosis and incorporates elements of fantasy, using a recurring monster as a symbolic mechanism through which he processes fear, anger, guilt, and anticipatory grief. The monster’s storytelling functions as a form of narrative mediation, allowing the protagonist to confront complex emotions that he is otherwise unable to articulate directly. Scholarly analysis highlights its portrayal of grief as nonlinear and unresolved, challenging earlier stage-based models of bereavement. While such texts can foster empathy and understanding, they also raise questions about representation, particularly the balance between symbolic narrative devices and the lived realities of serious illness.

=== Global approaches ===
Children’s literature represents death, aging, and intergenerational relationships differently across cultural contexts, reflecting broader social values and beliefs. In Northern European countries, particularly Sweden and Denmark, children’s picture books often present death and aging openly rather than avoiding these topics. Earlier traditions, such as German and Danish fairy tales, included death as a natural and inevitable part of life, while twentieth-century literature often avoided direct discussion of death.

Since the late twentieth century, however, children’s books in these regions have increasingly addressed death, especially through stories about relationships between children and elderly family members. For example, Scandinavian picture books frequently depict children forming close bonds with grandparents, which helps young readers understand aging, loss, and emotional connection. These texts often emphasize empathy, showing how children learn to understand others’ feelings through both narrative and visual elements.

Visual storytelling plays a particularly important role in global children’s literature, as images can communicate emotions such as grief, fear, and joy more effectively than words alone. In many European picture books, humor and everyday experiences are also used to introduce difficult topics like death in a way that is accessible to young readers. Across different countries, children’s books portray aging and institutional care in varied ways, sometimes presenting nursing homes as supportive environments and other times as restrictive or isolating spaces. Research on Danish picture books shows that these texts can reinforce or challenge social attitudes by depicting older adults as either dependent and isolated or active participants in relationships with children.

Globally, children’s literature also reflects differences in how societies view intergenerational relationships, with some emphasizing separation between age groups and others highlighting connection and mutual learning. Despite these differences, many contemporary children’s books share a common goal of helping young readers process complex experiences such as grief, illness, and death through relatable narratives and imagery.

=== Religious approaches ===
Religious perspectives continue to play a role in the treatment of death. An estimated 40% of literature for children ages 3 to 8 written in the 1970s and 1980s gave indications of religious beliefs. While only 16% included affirmation of those beliefs, none include disapproval. In one instance, a text even came under fire for being too vague in its description of the religious aspect of death: some readers took offense to Maria Shriver's What's Heaven?, because it did not specifically mention Jesus and did not dwell on whether or not everyone went to heaven. Boritzer's What is Death?, published only a year later, seems to be a response of sorts to this issue since it shows a variety of opinions on death. The lack of specifics does not appear to affect the popularity of Lifetimes: A Beautiful Way to Explain Death to Children by Mellonie and Ingpen. The universality of death is a subject in The Big Wave by Pearl Buck and The Fall of Freddie the Leaf by Buscaglia.
