= Bo's Place =

- Founded: 1982
- Founders: Karen Kraft Pennebaker, LCSW and Cissy Lowe Dickson
- Purpose: Grief support
- Location(s): 10050 Buffalo Speedway; Houston, Texas; United States
- Coordinates: 29°40′23.5″N 95°25′30.3″W
- Region served: Houston metropolitan area
- Key people: Jennifer Boubel, (executive director)
- Employees: 18
- Volunteers: 618 (2016)
- Website: www.bosplace.org

Bo's Place, established in 1990, is a nonprofit organization based in Houston, Texas. It offers free support programs for children, ages 3 to 18, and their families who have experienced the death of a child or an adult in their immediate family, as well as programs for grieving adults. Services include grief support groups offered in English and Spanish, community outreach programs, education and training, and an information and referral line staffed by mental health professionals. The referral line assists individuals that have experienced a death as well as family, friends, co-workers or other concerned individuals who want guidance to support the bereaved. Bo's Place serves over 1,200 children and adults each year and families stay an average of 14 to 16 months.

Bo's Place is funded by donations. Approximately 40% of Bo's Place revenue comes from special events such as its Annual Hearts of Hope Luncheon, with the remainder sourced from foundations, corporations, faith-based organizations, individuals and other organizations. Bo's Place is not a United Way organization and does not receive government funding.

== Model ==
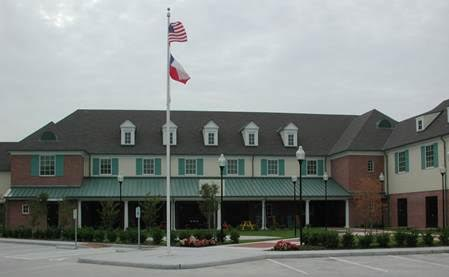
Bo's Place new building

The initial Bo's Place model was based on The Dougy Center in Portland, Oregon, a support program described as the first of its kind in the United States. Bo's Place offers age appropriate evening groups for children ages 5 to 18. Groups are facilitated by trained volunteers under the supervision of licensed mental health professionals. Children are given a safe environment to share with others to assist the healing process. Learning and sharing activities are designed to assist children in understanding and expressing the complex feelings that are part of the grieving process.

== History ==
In early 1990, Karen Kraft Pennebaker, LCSW, a Houston social worker, met with representatives from The Compassionate Friends, The Houston Chapter of the Center for Attitudinal Healing, the New Age Hospice (now The Houston Hospice, and Dr. Irvin Kraft, co-founder of the Houston Group Psychotherapy Society to discuss starting a free telephone referral network to provide contact information for free grief services to individuals and families grieving a death loss. Cissy Lowe Dickson, the Regional Coordinator of Compassionate Friends, expressed interest in joining Karen. The result was The Grief Center of Texas (TGCOT), incorporated in May 1990 as a 501(c)3 non-profit corporation. Karen, Cissy and Ron Downey, a funeral director for Forest Park Lawndale Funeral Home of Houston were the original board members. The initial goal was to refer to any group or institution offering free grief services, establish an Annual Networking Luncheon, and educate the public about the importance of grieving the death of a loved one.

At the second TGCOT Annual Networking Luncheon, Houston area grief services providers recommended organizing a national conference on grief. This led to the 1993 National Conference on Grief: From Ending to Beginning which was held in Houston on March 26–27, 1993. Guest speakers included Elisabeth Kübler-Ross. Dr. Charles A Corr.., Dr. Kenneth L Doka, Dr. Elizabeth Harper Neeld, Margaret Rose Caddy, RN, founder of the Houston Hospice, Dr. Baruch Brody, Dr. Stephen Pierrel, founder of Mental Health Services Services of the Houston Fire Department, and Melody Beattie. Over six hundred professionals and lay persons attended.

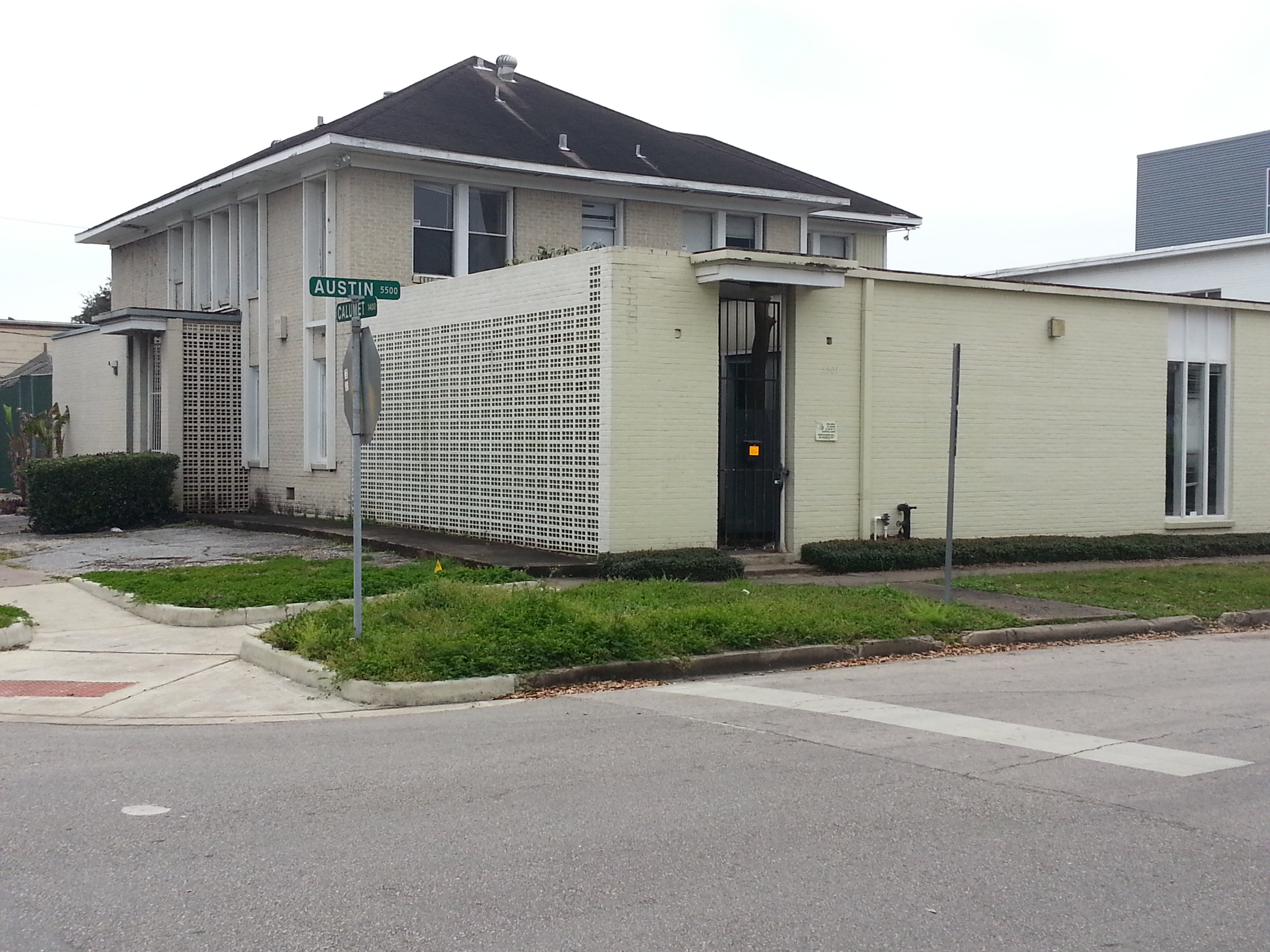
Bo's Place original location

In the fall of 1993, TGCOT elected to use the Conference proceeds to create a program for grieving children and their families. Karen Pennebaker discovered the Dougy Center in Portland, Oregon whose innovative, established model had been duplicated across the country. Cissy Dickson retired and Karen began the search for a house.

In January 1994, Interfaith Ministries for Greater Houston (IM)'s Executive Director, David Leslie, offered the Family Connection House at 5501 Austin. Karen invited Larry Neuhaus, a Houston investor, Board Member of Houston's Episcopal High School and co-founder of Camp For All to help investigate the opportunity. IM offered a two-year lease for $1 per year.

In July 1994, work began to clean, paint, repair, renovate and furnish the house. A number of community organizations assisted the effort, including The Harris County Youth and Family Services Division, St. Luke's United Methodist Church, First Presbyterian Church of Houston, Congregation Emanu El, First United Methodist Church of Pasadena, and Episcopal High School. Several area businesses donated carpet, paint and building materials.

In February 1995, the first volunteers were ready to train and a new name was needed for the program. The Board felt the name should reflect the spirit of the program and hope for healing, and recommended naming the center in honor of Laurence "Bo" Bosworth Neuhaus, son of Larry and Lindy Neuhaus, who died of liver cancer in 1985 at age 12. On the tenth anniversary of his death, Bo's Place was born. Karen Pennebaker resigned from the Board to become the first volunteer Executive Director and the first support groups were launched.

By 1998, the center was staffed and had developed 62 volunteer facilitators plus volunteers to run the Information and Referral Line. The Junior League of Houston helped fund a library dedicated to grief resource material for children, families, professionals and students. Bo's Place became a core training site for Baylor College of Medicine medical students through the Longitudinal Ambulatory Clinical Experience (LACE) program. In 1999, Bo's Place won The American Group Psychotherapy Association’s Aaron Stein Memorial Award For Innovative and Creative Use of Groups. In 2002, Bo's Place added a Little Friends group, a program which included traumatized children and their families, satellite groups in Ft. Bend County and Memorial, and daytime adult groups for mothers, fathers and young widows.

Karen Pennebaker retired from Bo's Place in February 2000 to resume her private practice.

In 2002, a $4.6 million capital campaign was kicked off to build a permanent residence, a family home style facility which opened in 2005. In November 2006, Bo’s Place held its first Camp Healing Hearts at Camp for All, an annual retreat for Bo’s Place families to participate in activities designed to support the ongoing grief journeys of each family. Bo’s Place launched a Spanish Outreach Initiative and offered its first offsite Houston metro area Spanish-language support groups in 2011. The goal of the initiative was to increase access to and enhance grief support services available to bereaved Hispanic/Latino families in the Houston area. In 2013, Bo’s Place launched an offsite group in Katy/West Houston.

Bo’s Place created a traveling photo exhibit entitled Life and Death...Let’s Talk About It in partnership with local photographer, Karen Sachar, in 2013. The exhibit was designed to raise awareness of the needs of the bereaved in the Houston community and how residents can play a role in providing support for these children, families and adults. The exhibit had its opening at the Houston Williams Tower during Children’s Grief Awareness Month and travels to venues throughout the Greater Houston area.

== Education and grief research ==
Bo’s Place is a member of the National Alliance for Grieving Children, and Bo’s Place staff regularly present at the Annual NAGC Symposium.

In 2008, Bo’s Place began to study participants’ progress on their grief journeys and their perception of the support they received from Bo's Place. The results were described in a paper entitled A Traumatic Death Support Group Program: Applying an Integrated Conceptual Framework published in the Journal Death Studies in 2012.

Bo's Place launched the National Archive of Grief Support Studies (NAGSS) in February 2009. The NAGSS database provides bibliographical information and summaries of recent articles relevant to grief and bereavement service providers. It was established to help grief support service providers facilitate discussion, understanding, and incorporation of research based ideas into their programming for the bereaved.

In 2014, Bo's Place began partnering with The University of Texas Health Sciences Trauma and Grief Center for Youth to help locally validate two assessment tools for screening and referral purposes. As a result, in 2015 three additional special programs were added to its annual program offerings: Retiro Sanando Corazones, a weekend camp offered for Spanish-speaking families; Camp for All 2U, a summer program that brings a camp experience to the Bo's Place home campus; and an additional Camp Healing Hearts to be offered the weekend before Thanksgiving for both English and Spanish-speaking families.

== Events and funding ==
The Bo's Place annual Hearts of Hope luncheon has honored a number of distinguished Houston area leaders. Held each Spring, highlights include awarding The Robin Bush Award for Outstanding Contributions to the Lives of Children, named in memory of the daughter of George H. W. and Barbara Bush. Past recipients of the Robin Bush Award include Virginia Holt McFarland; Susan Baker and Klinka Lollar; Missy and Allen McInnes; Nancy Gordon; Susan and Dr. Dick Stasney; Dr. John P. McGovern; Emily and Holcombe Crosswell; Lindy and Larry Neuhaus; Sue Trammell Whitfield; Elizabeth and Peter Wareing; Susan Light Lawhon and Carolyn Chappell Light; Muffin Clark; Patty and Craig Biggio; Mark A. Wallace; June Stobaugh; Bruce D. Perry; Dorothy Ables, Flo McGee, Ron Hall and Cheryl Strayed

Bo's place hosts regular events and charity shows in the Houston area and is regularly featured in local news

== Awards ==
The American Group Psychotherapy Association Aaron Stein Memorial Award For Innovative and Creative Use of Group, presented to Bo's Place of Houston at The 56th AGPA Annual Conference, February 27, 1999

== Publications ==
- A Traumatic Death Support Group Program: Applying an Integrated Conceptual Framework

== See also ==
- Prolonged grief disorder
- Grief counseling
- Death in children's literature
