= Ida B. =

Book by Katherine Hannigan

Ida B. ...and Her Plans to Maximize Fun, Avoid Disaster, and (Possibly) Save the World
- Author: Katherine Hannigan
- Language: English
- Genre: Children's novel
- Publisher: Greenwillow Books
- Publication date: August 17, 2005
- Publication place: United States
- Media type: Print (Hardcover & Paperback); Audio Book (CD, cassette, audio download)
- Pages: 256 pp
- ISBN: 978-0-06-073024-6
- OCLC: 54392071
- LC Class: PZ7.H19816 Id 2004

Ida B: ...and Her Plans to Maximize Fun, Avoid Disaster, and (Possibly) Save the World is a 2004 children's novel written by Katherine Hannigan. The audiobook version is narrated by Lili Taylor.

== Plot ==
Ida B. Applewood is a homeschooled nine-year-old Wisconsin farm girl who enjoys talking to trees in her family's orchard and playing in the brook with her dog Rufus. After hearing a chilling omen from a withered tree, her mother is diagnosed with an aggressive form of breast cancer. The diagnosis forces her father to sell a part of the orchard and enroll Ida in public school. Distressed by the change, Ida dresses in all black clothing and refuses to connect with her new classmates. As she grows more estranged from her family and the world around her, Ida learns that the family of one of her new classmates has purchased a piece of the orchard that her father sold. Ida eventually learns to adjust to the changes as her mother recovers from the cancer.

== Awards ==
- 2004 Josette Frank Award winner
- 2004 Publishers Weekly Best Children's Book selection
- 2004 Borders Original Voices, Young Adult category
- 2005 Quill Award Nominee
