= John R. Tunis =

American writer and broadcaster

- Born: John Roberts Tunis; December 7, 1889; Boston, Massachusetts, US
- Died: February 4, 1975 (aged 85); Essex, Connecticut, US
- Education: AB
- Alma mater: Harvard
- Occupations: Sports Broadcaster; Author
- Spouse: Lucy Rogers
- Writing career
- Subjects: Sports, war, education
- Notable works: Iron Duke; The Kid from Tomkinsville Brooklyn Dodgers series
- Notable awards: Golden Scroll Award; NY Tribune Book Award

John Roberts Tunis (December 7, 1889 – February 4, 1975), "the 'inventor' of the modern sports story", was an American writer and broadcaster. Known for his juvenile sports novels, Tunis also wrote short stories and non-fiction, including a weekly sports column for the New Yorker magazine. As a commentator Tunis was part of the first trans-Atlantic sports cast and the first broadcast of the Wimbledon Tennis Tournament to the United States.

After graduating from Harvard and serving in the Army during World War I, Tunis began his writing career freelancing for American sports magazines while playing tennis in the Riviera. For the next two decades he wrote short stories and articles about sports and education for magazines including Reader's Digest, The Saturday Evening Post and Esquire. Tunis' work often protested the increasing professionalization of sports in America. He believed that amateur participation in sports taught values important for good citizenship like perseverance, fair play and equality, and that the emphasis on professional sports was turning America into a country of spectators. His sports books also tackled current social issues such as antisemitism and racial equality.

Though Tunis never considered himself a children's writer, all but one of his twenty-four books were published for juveniles; their success helped create the juvenile fiction book market in the 1940s. Books like Iron Duke (1938), All American (1942) and Keystone Kids (1943) were well received by readers and critics. Iron Duke received the New York Herald Tribune Spring Book Festival Award for best juvenile novel and was named a The Horn Book Magazine Best Book. The Child Study Association of America gave its Golden Scroll Award to Keystone Kids.

Tunis' eight-book baseball series about the Brooklyn Dodgers began with The Kid from Tomkinsville, a book often cited by sports writers and commentators as inspiring childhood reading. Phillip Roth used The Kid from Tomkinsville and its main character Roy Tucker in his book American Pastoral. It is also considered an influence for Bernard Malamud's The Natural and Mark Harris' Bang the Drum Slowly.

== Early years ==
John Roberts Tunis was born December 7, 1889, to John Arthur and Caroline Greene Roberts Tunis, a teacher, in Boston, Massachusetts. John Arthur came from a well-to-do family, which he upset by leaving the Episcopalian church to become a Unitarian minister. His family disowned him when he married Caroline, the daughter of a waiter. When Tunis was seven and his brother Robert five their father died of Bright's disease; no one from the Tunis side of the family attended the funeral. After his death their mother taught at Brearley School for girls in Manhattan, later moving the family to Cambridge, Massachusetts, where she ran a boarding house.

Tunis' maternal grandfather encouraged the brothers to take an interest in baseball. Two of young Tunis' heroes were Boston Nationals' baseball players Billy Hamilton and Fred Tenney. At age fourteen Tunis and his brother, too poor to pay the admission price, managed to watch a Davis Cup tennis match by climbing on top of a brewery wagon outside the courts. Tunis played tennis at Cambridge Latin School, then followed in his father's footsteps to Harvard where he competed in tennis and ran track. He graduated from Harvard with a B. A. in 1911, then got a job in a Newburyport, Massachusetts, cotton mill. Tunis became an officer in the U.S. Army, serving in France during World War I. On February 19, 1918, Tunis married Lucy Rogers in Cambridge, Massachusetts. They did not have any children.

== Early career ==
=== Freelance writing and sportscasting ===
In 1921 the couple went to Europe where Tunis freelanced as a sports writer for American publications and played in some tennis tournaments on the Riviera, including a match against King Gustaf V of Sweden, who was 70 at the time. Tunis also played a doubles match against the French women's champion Suzanne Lenglen. Returning to the U.S. at the end of the summer, he dropped in on former Harvard classmate Lawrence Winship, the Sunday editor of The Boston Globe. When Winship learned that Tunis actually knew the flamboyant Lenglen, he insisted he write an article about her for the Globe before leaving the building. The pressure of that deadline caused him such anxiety that after half an hour of struggle he went to the building's fire escape, "leaned over the railing, and threw up. I'll never forget it. I wiped my face with copy paper. But I did the story." Between 1920 and 1940 Tunis freelanced for a number of major magazines, including Reader's Digest, Harper's, Atlantic Monthly, Collier's, The Saturday Evening Post and Esquire, writing primarily on two topics: sports and education. He also covered sports for the New York Evening Post from 1925 to 1932 and had a weekly column in The New Yorker. According to Norman Cousins in Writing for Love or Money, Tunis was known for producing "fact-packed articles based upon research". Working six days a week and taking the seventh to play tennis, Tunis published over 2,000 articles and short stories, becoming one ofAmerica's premier sportswriters.

At the same time, Tunis worked as a sport announcer, including commentating for tennis events for NBC. By 1927 The Harvard Crimson felt comfortable calling him "a world's authority on tennis". He was part of the first trans-Atlantic sports broadcast, a Davis Cup match from France in 1932. In 1934 Tunis announced the first broadcast of the Wimbledon Tennis Tournament to a U.S. audience. According to Anita Silvey in Children's Books and Their Creators, between broadcasting and journalism Tunis became a "household name".

=== Novels and sports criticism ===
Tunis' first novel, American Girl, appeared in 1930. An unflattering and thinly veiled fictionalization of tennis star Helen Wills Moody, it became the basis for the 1951 movie Hard, Fast and Beautiful. (Note: This according to Tunis. Some sources say the short story "The Mother of a Champion" was the source.) It turned out to be the only one of Tunis' novels to be published for adults.

In 1936, on the 25th anniversary of his graduation from Harvard, Tunis wrote Was College Worthwhile?, a condemnation of the Ivy League school and of his classmates that became a best seller. Jerome Holtzman, in No Cheering in the Press Box, calls it "a searing assault on Harvard traditions". Throughout his career he continued to write about education, including the chapter "New Leaven on the Campus" for Democracy's Challenge to Education, and "Education and Ethics" for The Journal of Higher Education.

The 1920-1930s have been called the Golden Age of Sports, and Tunis was right in the middle of much of it as a commentator, writer, and athlete, but he often criticized what he saw. He disliked the way the media was covering sports and its players. In the 1920s some sports promoters bribed newspapers for favorable coverage, and he felt the media was glorifying the business and ignoring its problems. Tunis also believed that high salaries would destroy the pleasure and benefits sports brought the everyday player. His essay "The Great God Football" appeared in Harper's Magazine in 1928, attacking what he saw as the increasing commercialization of college football. The article became the center of a continuing controversy. A 2010 The Texas Observer cover story, titled The Golden Football: The University of Texas’ Bad Example, opens with a two-paragraph reference to Tunis' article, and concludes by referring the reader back to Tunis' 1928 description of college football as a "first-class octopus strangling the legitimate pursuits of educational institution[s]." "Who Owns Football?" appeared in Sports Story Magazine in 1931, in 2012 John Dinan's Sports in the Pulp Magazines called it "timeless".

According to Ryan K. Anderson in Upon Further Review: Sports in American Literature, "By the 1940s, Tunis enjoyed a career based on the practice of criticizing those aspects of American culture that others took lightly"." He felt that the more organized sports became, the more they led to the glorification of athletes, turning the United States into a country of spectators. As much as he loved sports, his writings often tried to show the need for balance in personal and national life. At one point he declared "Sports is the great opium of the people. It has become an addiction. It has made them forget more important things."

As the Depression took its toll on magazine finances, Tunis began working on another novel, Iron Duke, the story of a small-town Iowa football star who struggles to fit in with his elite classmates at Harvard, and eventually finds strength through success as a runner. He wrote the book for adults, but Alfred Harcourt wanted to publish and market it for juveniles. This initially dismayed Tunis, partly because at that time the separate field of young adult fiction did not exist, (Note: Young-adult fiction is generally accepted as having appeared as a separate genre in the early 1940s, some experts pinpointing 1942 as its inaugural year.) and Tunis did not consider himself a children's writer. He eventually agreed and in 1938 Harcourt, Brace published Iron Duke as a children's book. The novel won the New York Herald Tribune Spring Book Festival Award for best juvenile novel and opened a new arena for Tunis. Tunis' success with these books made him one of a handful of writers who helped establish the young-adult market as a separate field. Kirkus Reviews gave Iron Duke a starred review among "books of remarkable merit", its reviewer calling it "One of the best modern college stories I have read". It was also named a The Horn Book Magazine Fanfare Best Book for 1938. The following year Harcourt released the sequel, The Duke Decides, which covers Duke's senior year at Harvard. Duke's participation as part of the U.S. Olympic team in Germany allowed Tunis to highlight the growing totalitarianism in Europe. Iron Duke was Tunis' best selling novel and remains his most well known work.

== Later career ==
First edition cover of Tunis' 1946 novel, The Kid Comes Back, the fifth in his eight-book series about the Brooklyn Dodgers.

=== 1940s ===
In 1940 Tunis received $200 from his publisher to visit the Dodgers' spring training camp in Clearwater, Florida. He then began work on his first baseball novel. The Kid from Tomkinsville became the first in a series of eight books about the Brooklyn Dodgers. In it, Tunis introduced rookie pitcher Roy Tucker and his teammates: "Bones" Hathaway, "Razzle" Nugent and "Fat Stuff" Foster. Tunis says in a note at the beginning of the book that "all the characters in this book were drawn from real life." Though his papers only list Tucker as "Number 36", they do say that, among others, "Gabby" Gus was based on Leo Durocher and Dave Leonard was inspired by Luke Sewell. Kirkus gave it another starred review, saying it "struck a new note". Tucker's story continues in 1941's World Series.

The next year Tunis took a break from baseball stories to release two novels that again received starred reviews from Kirkus. Million Miler, based on the life of TWA and U.S. Air Corps pilot Jack Zimmerman, was overshadowed by his other 1942 release, All American, called by Simon Certner in The English Journal "the most superb novel produced in its genre". All American centers on football star Ronald Perry, who in protest over anti-Semitic activity and guilt for his part in it, leaves his prep school to play football for the local public high school, which does not exactly welcome him. Perry ultimately adjusts and becomes accepted, leading his new team to a postseason playoff. However, the team is invited only if they agree not to bring their one African-American player. Initially Perry is the only one who objects to this, but his refusal eventually stirs other students and parents to protest as well. Kirkus Reviews said of Tunis' only football novel, "This is one of the BIG books of the Fall, and should not be pigeonholed for junior reading." It further praised the book for illustrating "the whole rounded picture of race and color problems facing young and old today". Sixty-eight years later D.G. Myers, in "About the Manliest Sport", his 2010 article for Commentary magazine, decries the lack of good novels about football, calling All American "the best of a bad harvest... No one is better at describing the action on the field", though Myers warns that "readers will find Tunis dated". In a chapter titled "John R. Tunis: The Best of the Best", Michelle Nolan's 2010 book Ball Tales praises All American as "a perceptive novel of character, of morals, and it's far ahead of its time". Just how ahead of its time may be seen when Nolan points out that Hans Walleen's illustrations "may be the first of an African American football player in action in an American sports novel."

With 1943's Keystone Kids, Tunis returned to his beloved Dodgers, again addressing anti-Semitism, this time as manager and shortstop Spike Russell struggles to get his brother, and the rest of the team, to accept star catcher Jocko Klein. Keystone Kids received the Child Study Association of America Golden Scroll Award as the "most challenging children's book of the year".

The next Dodgers novel, Rookie of the Year, appeared in 1944. Manager Russell struggles with an arrogant new pitcher. The same year Yea! Wildcats! took Tunis, and the reader, to Indiana for high school basketball tournament season. Tunis actually visited Indiana for his research, living with a key player and his family during tournament season. Called by Ball Tales "Hoosiers four decades before Hoosiers", the entire Varsity team is cut over a discipline infraction, and coach Don Henderson must resist the pressures of parents and community to win at all costs. Kirkus says Yea! Wildcats! was "a plea for clean sport – sport for sports sake, not for gamblers – and for taking money and politics out of school sport." Coach Henderson returned the next year in A City for Lincoln, working with juvenile delinquents and eventually running for mayor. In both these books Tunis returns to a favorite theme noted by Ryan K. Anderson in his survey of Tunis' World War II era writings; that parents, administrators, gamblers and other adult fans "injected improper values" into amateur sports. In one speech Coach Henderson says "I don't really believe there are any bad kids, leastways not many. One or two, one or two perhaps... but there's plenty of bad parents."

World War II was on Tunis' mind while he wrote. In 1946's The Kid Comes Back he takes Roy Tucker into occupied France, where a plane crash injures Tucker's back. Returning to the Dodgers, Tucker struggles to overcome his injury and cope with being the old man on the team. He becomes the voice of Tunis, emphasizing team spirit over individual glory, when he aids the rookie trying to replace him, saying "What helps you helps all".

Tunis' sixth Dodgers novel, Highpockets, came out in 1948. The title is the nickname for Cecil McDade, the talented rookie outfielder whose arrogance causes problems on and off the field. The novel won the Boy Scouts of America's junior book award for 1949. Son of the Valley, which also came out that year, is one of Tunis' few non-sports related novels, dramatizing the struggle for acceptance of the Tennessee Valley Authority among rural families displaced by a new dam. A portion of it was excerpted as "Johnny's Experiment" in Told Under Spacious Skies. 1949 saw the publication of his next-to-last book about the Dodgers. Young Razzle is the story of veteran pitcher Razzle Nugent and his estranged rookie son, who reconcile during Razzle's final season of baseball. Ball Tales calls it "Tunis' most entertaining, if not profound, story."

=== 1950s ===
Tunis' next novel, Go Team Go, set in 1954, returns to Indiana basketball. Again, a coach risks the support of fans by cutting players, including the team star. The hero, Tom Williams, comes to see that his coach was right, and gets his father's respect – and the girl – by helping the new team move forward. Buddy and the Old Pro is a 1955 novel about Pop Warner football. Tunis disliked organized sports for young children, saying "I've always believed Little League is harmful to the extreme. It's for the parents, and that's what I object to... I don't like the idea of having little boys playing in front of their parents and friends. Little boys should be playing their sports by themselves." In what Michelle Nolan in Ball Tales calls a "remarkable book", Tunis uses his only non-Dodgers baseball novel to emphasize a favorite theme when the young protagonist admits to his father "it's better to lose, much as it hurts, than to play dirty".

Schoolboy Johnson closed out the decade in 1959. Roy Tucker and teammate Speedy Mason are cut from the Dodgers and end up together on a Triple-AAA team. When both men get called back, the older and wiser players teach young Schoolboy the meaning of the game. "Baseball is a test of character, how you react under pressure". Schoolboy Johnson ended Tunis' Dodgers series, and it was his last true sports novel until 1973's Grand National.

=== 1960s ===
Tunis wrote only two novels in the 1960s, both set during World War II. Silence over Dunkerque appeared in 1962. It tells the story of the evacuation of Dunkerque during World War II. The book received a starred review from Kirkus. Gail Murray in Boyhood in America called it "moving" and Children Experience Literature said it was a "grimly realistic picture of warfare and its effect on both soldiers and civilians". According to the International Reading Association, while reading it "children may be helped to understand that history is always someone's interpretation... For in this story the author had the courage to admit that our men were sometimes less than brave in their desperate struggle to survive".

Tunis' autobiography, A Measure of Independence, appeared in 1964. Ball Tales makes it "Highly recommended for anyone who aspires to be, or remain, a freelance writer". It barely mentions any of Tunis' sports books, concentrating instead on his magazine career. According to The National Cyclopaedia of American Biography, some critics consider A Measure of Independence "a powerful dramatic novel written under the guise of an autobiography".

His Enemy, His Friend appeared in 1967. Tunis considered this second World War II book to be his best work. Horn Book agreed, calling it "his finest novel... With its irony and eloquence the story not only shows the futility of war but carries the central character to the heights of the protagonist in a Greek tragedy". Opening with an Author's Note stating "This is a book about the conscience of a man", the story tells of a German sergeant, a convicted war criminal remembered by the French as the Butcher of Nogent-Plage, who returns to the area twenty years after the war's end, to play soccer. Literature IS... Collected Essays says the novel "lays bare man's age-old confusion between his inner conscience and the demands of his culture".

=== 1970s and death ===
In 1973 Tunis' final sports novel appeared. Boys' Life published an excerpt from Grand National and gave the book a positive review, calling it "exciting". Kirkus, however, found it "sentimental" and "tepid". The publication of Grand National brought Tunis' total number of juvenile novels to twenty-three.

John R. Tunis, according to D. G. Myers "perhaps the greatest sports novelist of all time", died on February 4, 1975, in Boston, Massachusetts, survived by his wife, Lucy Rogers. His papers are held at Boston University.

== Themes ==
Leonard Marcus in Minders of Make-Believe: Idealists, Entrepreneurs, and the Shaping of American Children's Literature, says "Tunis's books were never only about sports", noting "the author's determination to offer his readers basic lessons about good citizenship and fair play, and a chance to reflect on such rarely discussed social issues as racial equality and anti-Semitism". A doctoral study at Oklahoma State University in 1996 analyzed all of Tunis' juvenile sports books. The predominant value found both in the books and their main characters was Courtesy/Fairness/Respect. The second most identified value was Compassion/Kindness. The study found that "the values are not portrayed didactically, as part of lessons, but rather as a natural part of the stories". In his book What Would Frank Merriwell Do?, Ryan Anderson also pointed out the recurring theme of fairness and sportsmanship over winning in both Tunis' fiction and non-fiction, saying "The common thread winding through all his writing became his dismay over the nation's tendency to value winning above common decency." In turning from primarily writing non-fiction for adults to juvenile fiction Tunis did not abandon his emphasis on values over victory, but it did give him an audience that seemed more willing to listen.

Rather than emphasize winning, Tunis believed that values like hard work and perseverance could be taught through sports. The 1951 football brochure for the South Dakota School of Mines & Technology Athletic Scholarship committee cites Tunis, saying "The athletic department would like to feel that the existing program can do for the engineer what John Tunis had in mind when he said, 'The deep objective of games really is to train one’s reflex of purpose to develop a habit of keeping steadily at something you want until it is done.'" Many of Tunis' biggest heroes find themselves eventually brought low, like Roy Tucker in The Kid Comes Back, whose wartime service injury may have destroyed his career, or Iron Duke Jim Wellington at Harvard, ostracized and lonely, who perseveres by running track. The real victory is in the character's refusal to give up against long odds. "My heroes are the losers" he once said. "All my books have been in that vein. Every book I've ever written." In the Introduction to The Kid from Tomkinsville, Bruce Brooks writes "for Tunis a win was what happened at the ballpark some of the time, usually just before a loss. It didn't make you a good person, anymore than a loss made you a jerk."

Tunis did not exclude the social issues of the times from his writing. In 1936 Foreign Affairs published "The Dictators Discover Sport", about Hitler, Mussolini and their use of sports to influence, exploit and control their youth. Tunis also took on issues closer to home. He believed in the concept of "Democratic Sport", that games open to any person "regardless of ethnicity, class, or skill" promoted the values America needed, and he used his stories to demonstrate those values, taking racism head on. According to the Child Study Association of America, in Keystone Kids "the issue of anti-Semitism in American democracy is squarely faced and courageously met". The 1942 Northwestern University radio program "Of Men and Books" featured All American in its episode titled "Children's Books and American Unity".

In 1945 writer and reviewer Howard Pease wrote: "Only at infrequent intervals do you find a story intimately related to this modern world, a story that takes up a modern problem and thinks it through without evasion... of our hundreds of authors, I can name only three who are doing anything to fill this void in children's reading. These three authors—may someone present each of them with a laurel wreath—are Doris Gates, John R. Tunis, and Florence Crannell Means."

== Legacy ==
By the 1970s Tunis felt his message had been ignored or misunderstood by most Americans, saying "Nobody has paid attention... There was a time when I expected to do some good. But that was a long while ago." This may seem surprising considering that his New York Times obituary referred to him as a man who "helped educate a whole generation of Americans". Perhaps seen in light of Tunis' distrust of professional athletics, it can be understood. Though he may have felt his message against the commercialization of sports was ignored, there are those who cite Tunis as having made a lasting impact in publishing and to them personally and professionally.

In literature Tunis' contributions have sometimes been direct. His baseball books, especially The Kid from Tomkinsville, have been cited as one source of inspiration for Bernard Malamud's book The Natural, about baseball star Roy Hobbs. Among other similarities, both Hobbs and Tucker started as pitchers but, thanks to accidents, ended up as outfielders and power-hitters. It has been suggested by Michele Schiavone in her study of Tunis' influence on Malamud and Roth that, as an early fan of the Dodgers, Malamud was familiar with Tunis' books and borrowed from them, "consciously or not". Bruce Brooks' introduction to the 1987 edition of The Kid from Tomkinsville says that Tunis "obviously" inspired Mark Harris, author of Bang the Drum Slowly. And in what D. G. Myers in Best Baseball Books Ever called "one of the best pieces of (literary) criticism ever written", The Kid from Tomkinsville is referenced by Nathan Zuckerman, the main character in Philip Roth's novel American Pastoral. For Zuckerman, Tunis' book and pitcher Roy Tucker become what Schiavone called "a template for Zuckerman's view of the Swede", and his realization of the "tragic underside to the American Dream".

A number of sportscasters, writers and journalists point to Tunis' books as inspiration for their careers. Tunis is mentioned by author Daniel Okrent in the dedication for The Ultimate Baseball Book as one of "those responsible for the earliest roots of this project". Writer and editor Tad Richards says, "I remember telling my mother... 'When I grow up to be a writer, and people ask me about the greatest influence on my writing career, I'm going to say John R. Tunis.'" Among Tunis' many childhood fans are sports writer and children's author Thomas J. Dygard, Pulitzer Prize finalist Lee Martin, journalist Charles Kuralt and football legend Johnny Unitas. New York Post columnist and editor Pete Hamill picked The Kid From Tomkinsville as one of his five favorite sports novels, writing that "virtually every sportswriter I know remembers reading it as a boy." In Partial Payment: Essays on Writers and Their Lives, literary critic Joseph Epstein devotes one chapter, "A Boy's Own Author", to Tunis. Epstein admits that re-reading many childhood favorites can be disappointing, but found upon revisiting Tunis that his books are "pretty serious, and I was utterly absorbed in them".

In The Continuum Encyclopedia of Children's Literature Nancy Horton called Tunis "the forefather of the genre of young adult sports fiction". His novels changed the way sports fiction was written, adding depth by addressing social themes and adolescent issues. Up until his time sports stories focused solely on the games, and treated the athletes as Horatio Alger stereotypes. His stories gave the games context and addressed the pressures and problems of growing up in the spotlight, moving sports from the realm of pulp magazines to serious fiction.

In his tribute to the writer, Bernard Hayes said "Tunis has probably made good readers of millions of young people." His success with the juvenile audience helped change the publishing industry. Along with writers like Howard Pease, his books demonstrated to publishers that there was money to be made in targeting books for teenagers. His influence went beyond simply creating a market for young adult books. "In his attempt to link sports with the communities in which they are played, he broached some highly significant issues in the literature written for and about America's youth", according to John S. Simmons in John R. Tunis and the Sports Novels for Adolescents: A Little Ahead of His Time. Tunis never considered himself a writer of boys' books, insisting his stories could be read and enjoyed by adults. He felt that the word "juvenile" was an "odious... product of a merchandising age". Despite his dislike of the term, Tunis' novels helped create and shape the juvenile fiction book market.

== Bibliography ==
=== Fiction ===
The Kid from Tomkinsville Brooklyn Dodgers series

- Tunis, John R. (1940). The Kid from Tomkinsville. New York: Harcourt, Brace.
- World Series, Harcourt, Brace, 1941
- Keystone Kids, Harcourt, Brace, 1943
- Rookie of the Year, Harcourt, Brace, 1944
- The Kid Comes Back, William Morrow, 1946
- Highpockets, William Morrow, 1948
- Young Razzle, William Morrow, 1949
- Schoolboy Johnson, William Morrow, 1958

Basketball

- Yea! Wildcats! Harcourt, Brace, 1944
- A City for Lincoln, Harcourt, Brace, 1945
- Go Team Go, Morrow, 1954

Track and Field

- Iron Duke, Harcourt, Brace, 1938
- The Duke Decides, Harcourt, Brace, 1939

Women's tennis

- American Girl, Brewer and Warren, 1930
- Champion's Choice, Harcourt, Brace, 1940

World War II

- Silence over Dunkerque, William Morrow, 1962, (WWII)
- His Enemy, His Friend, William Morrow, 1967, (WWII)

Other titles

- All American, Harcourt, Brace, 1942, (football)
- Million Miler, The Story of an Air Pilot, Messner, 1942, (biography)
- Son of the Valley, William Morrow, 1949, (Tennessee Valley Authority)
- The Other Side of the Fence, William Morrow, 1953, (golf)
- Buddy and the Old Pro, William Morrow, 1955, (Pop Warner football)
- Grand National, William Morrow, 1973, (horse racing)

=== Non-fiction ===
- J. R. T. (June 13, 1925). "Hard-boiled golf". The New Yorker. Vol. 1, no. 17. pp. 18–19.
- Was College Worthwhile?, Harcourt, Brace, 1936
- This Writing Game, A S Barnes, 1941, (collected essays)
- Sport for the Fun of It, A. S. Barnes, 1950, (sports handbook)
- The American Way in Sport, Duell, Sloan and Pearce, 1958
- A Measure of Independence, Athenaeum, 1964, (autobiography)
