= The War That Saved My Life =

Book by Kimberly Brubaker Bradley

- Author: Kimberly Brubaker Bradley
- Language: English
- Genre: Historical Fiction
- Publisher: Dial Books for Young Readers
- Publication date: 2015
- Publication place: United States
- Media type: Print
- Pages: 316
- Followed by: The War I Finally Won

The War That Saved My Life, by Kimberly Brubaker Bradley, is a 2015 children's historical novel published by Dial Books for Young Readers. In 2016, it was a Newbery Honor Book and was named to the Bank Street Children's Book Committee's Best Books of the Year List with an "Outstanding Merit" distinction and won the committee's Josette Frank Award for fiction.

== Plot ==
Ada Smith is a ten-year-old girl who has never left her apartment in London. Her physically abusive, widowed mother is too embarrassed to let her go outside because of her clubfoot and claims Ada is mentally disabled as a pretext. Ada is regularly punished by being put in a damp cabinet under the sink, where cockroaches live. She is used as a servant, and cooks and takes care of her six-year-old brother Jamie, of whom she is quite protective.

In September 1939, the British government began to evacuate children in urban areas of England during World War II, sending them to the countryside. Ada's mother refuses to send her, saying nobody will want to take care of her. Meanwhile, Ada has spent all summer teaching herself how to walk and decides to leave with Jamie without their mother knowing. They are evacuated by train to Kent to get away from the conditions coming because of the war.

Susan Smith, who lives in a coastal village in Kent, is forced to take Ada and Jamie in, despite her aversion to caring for children. Away from her mother, Ada is allowed to freely move about by Susan despite her clubfoot and as such befriends Susan and other villagers. Susan owns a pony named Butter, and Ada learns to ride, as well as to read, write, and sew, and she is introduced by Susan to many concepts she has never experienced before. Susan overcomes her reluctance to take care of the children, reading to them, making them clothes, obtaining crutches for Ada, and allowing Jamie to keep a cat she intensely dislikes. Ada helps British troops evacuate across the English Channel from Dunkirk, and later identifies an enemy spy, who is detained.

Susan has discovered that it is possible for an operation to be conducted on Ada to correct her clubfoot, but it requires money and permission from Ada's mother. After months of not responding to Susan's letters regarding Ada's operation, Ada's mother comes to the village. She complains about the government 'forcing' her to spend money on her children, and sharply criticizes Susan and Ada's 'posh' behavior. Ada can stay with Susan, but to continue caring for her brother, she decides to move back to London with her mother, who believes that the capital will not be bombed anytime soon. The Smiths move into a new – albeit little better – flat, and Ada's crutches are taken away by her mother. She believes her mother never wanted to have children in the first place and only took Ada and Jamie back for the lowered expenses, suspicions confirmed by their mother. One day, she leaves to go to work, and Ada and Jamie escape to an air raid shelter just before a bomb damages the area. Susan comes and finds the Smith children, bringing them back to the village, where she finds that a bomb has destroyed her house. Butter and Jamie's cat have survived; Ada decides that by being picked up in London by Susan rather than the latter staying at home and getting killed sufficiently repays her debt to Susan for being rescued from life with her mother.

== Characters ==
- Ada Smith: A ten-year-old girl whose right foot is affected by clubfoot. She has been emotionally and physically abused by her mother. While living in the countryside with Susan, Ada learns how to walk, ride a horse, sew, read, and write.
- Jamie Smith: Ada's six-year-old brother. He discovers his passion for planes when he and Ada move to the countryside.
- Susan Smith: Ada's designated guardian, learns to love and take care of both Ada and Jamie after some reluctance.
- Stephen White: Ada's friend. He helps Ada at the train station and carries her to the train. He also cares for Colonel McPherson and does not leave with his mother. He is Ada's first true friend.
- Billy White: Jamie's friend. He is Stephen's younger brother and leaves the countryside shortly with his mother and sisters.
- Mam: Ada and Jamie's mother. An uncaring, stern, aggressive, and abusive mother who continuously blames Ada for her "ugly foot".
- Lady Eleanor Thorton: Also known as the Iron-faced Lady. Head of the village's branch of the Women's Volunteer Service. In charge of the evacuations to Kent, and by extension, Ada and Jamie.
- Margaret (Maggie) Thorton: Lady Thorton's 12-year-old daughter. Ada's best friend.
- Fred Grimes: The person who looks after the horses at the Thornton's stable and teaches Ada how to ride Butter.
- Bovril: Jamie's cat, which Jamie got from who knows where.
- Butter: Susan's pony, also the pony that Ada learns to ride and care for.

== Reception ==
The War That Saved My Life received critical acclaim. The Horn Book Magazine claims "This is a feel-good story, but an earned one". School Library Journal talks about the emotional connection readers will have: "Readers will ache for her as she misreads cues and pushes Susan away, even though she yearns to be enfolded in a hug. There is much to like here - Ada's engaging voice, the vivid setting, the humor, the heartbreak, but most of all the tenacious will to survive exhibited by Ada and the villagers who grow to love and accept her". Thom Barthelmess in The Horn Book Magazine stated "Bradley’s novel is exceptional for the characters’ deep humanity".
