= Belling The Tiger =

1961 book by Mary Stolz

Belling the Tiger
- Author: Mary Stolz
- Illustrator: Beni Montresor
- Language: English
- Genre: Children's novel
- Publisher: Harper
- Publication date: 1961

Belling the Tiger is a 1961 children's book written by Mary Stolz and illustrated by Beni Montresor. The story is a reimagining of Aesop's fable Belling the Cat. It was a Newbery Honor book in 1961.

== Summary ==
Two timid mice, Asa and Rambo, are tasked by Portman, the leader of their colony, with placing a warning bell on a local cat. After stealing a collar and bell from a store, they are chased by a different cat and seek refuge on a ship. The ship sets sail and docks at a tropical island, and the two disembark.

Exploring the island, Asa and Rambo encounter a giant cat in the jungle. Undaunted, they place the collar and bell on the cat's tail, its neck too big to fit. The bell awakens the cat, a friendly tiger, who recruits the mice to help scare an elephant, knowing elephants fear mice. The plan works, and the mice become enamored with their new power. The tiger cautions them, explaining that, just as the elephant was afraid of the mice, everything fears something. The mice return to the ship and take the tiger's advice to heart.

Returning home, the mice confront Portman, and with their newfound sense of courage, request and are promoted to pantry mice.
