= The Moved-Outers =

1946 children's novel by Florence Crannell Means

- First edition
- Author: Florence Crannell Means
- Language: English
- Genre: Children's literature / historical fiction
- Publication date: February 28, 1945
- Publication place: United States

The Moved-Outers is a 1945 children's novel written by Florence Crannell Means and illustrated by Helen Blair. The novel is set on the West Coast during World War II and tracks the lives of a Japanese family during their internment. The story centers on Sumiko (Sue) Ohara, a high school senior from Rancho Cordova, California, her brother Kim, her mother, and their lives while imprisoned in the Granada War Relocation Center; Sue's father is sent to Fort Lincoln Internment Camp. During her imprisonment, she falls in love with a neighbor from her hometown, Jiro Ito. The novel ends in 1943, with the war still ongoing, as Jiro and Kim join the army, and Sue and Jiro's sister attend college.

== Reception ==
The book received a Newbery Honor and the Children's Book Award in 1946. The Rocky Mountain News called it "the most intelligent and effective bit of writing on the Japanese American evacuation", and Parents' Magazine had high praise for the book:

It is a fine young thing for young people to have this book which tells simply and without sentimentality the dreary tale of the evacuation of Japanese and Japanese-Americans to camps behind barbed wire.
