= The Manny Files =

2006 book by Christian Burch

- First edition
- Author: Christian Burch
- Language: English
- Genre: Realism
- Publisher: Atheneum Books for Young Readers
- Publication date: 2006
- Pages: 296
- Awards: Josette Frank Award, 2007, Winner Lambda Literary Award, 2006, Finalist, Children's (Young Adult) Best Children's Books of the Year, 2007 Ages (9 to 12) Rainbow List, 2008 Middle Early Young Adult Fiction
- ISBN: 9781416900399
- Followed by: Hit the Road, Manny

The Manny Files is a 2006 young adult novel written by Christian Burch and published by Atheneum Books. It won the Lambda Literary Award for Children's and Young Adult Literature in 2007 and jointly won the Josette Frank Award in 2007.

The book's sequel, Hit the Road, Manny, was released in 2008 and won the Lambda Literary Award for Children's and Young Adult Literature in 2009.

== Plot introduction ==
Keats Dalinger, a shy young boy, learns how to be more outgoing and self-confident after his family hires a new Manny (male nanny) which is a word play for the words "man" and "nanny". Keats is a small boy who has many troubles at school and an ailing grandmother at home.

The Manny is a homosexual, as revealed at the end of the novel, when he and Keats' Uncle Max share a kiss. The book is told in First-person narrative with Keats as the narrator.

== Summary ==
This story revolves around Keats and his family's adventure with their Manny (Male Nanny). It also showed how Keats was struggling with his self-confidence and with the help of their manny, was able to overcome it. Keats described his new Manny as kind, carefree and spirited, and has a bold creativity. Throughout the course of their relationship the Manny helps Keats get over some of these fears while learning to garner respect from other people with class and integrity.
