= Zoa Sherburne =

American writer (1912–1995)

- Born: September 30, 1912 Seattle, Washington, U.S.
- Died: October 10, 1995 (aged 83)
- Occupation: Author
- Genre: Young adult fiction
- Notable awards: Children's Book Award (1959)

Zoa Sherburne (September 30, 1912 – October 10, 1995) was an American author, most known for her young adult fiction.

== Early life ==
Sherburne was born in Seattle, Washington and began writing in elementary school. At 10, she started writing poetry. Her local newspaper, the Ballard Tribune, published a column of her poetry called "The Gremlin's Say." She started writing short stories, poems, and plays.

== Career ==
Sherburne went on to be a prolific writer, publishing over 300 short stories in magazines. In the 1950s, upon her agent's suggestion, she began writing books as they noticed that short stories began to be less-published due to television's rising popularity. She went on to publish thirteen novels, which together have been translated into over 27 languages. One of her books, Stranger in the House, about a family dealing with the return of their mother from a mental institution, became a movie: Memories Never Die (1982). Her novels often dealt with girls in difficult circumstances: coping with a mother's alcoholism (Jennifer), with the remarriage of a parent (Almost April and The Girl in the Mirror), with an unexpected pregnancy (Too Bad About the Haines Girl), with guilt over a hit-and-run (Leslie). In her time slip story Why Have the Birds Stopped Singing? the stigma of epilepsy is added to the usual cultural disorientation, and in her paranormal tale, The Girl Who Knew Tomorrow, the young psychic girl finds fame a mixed blessing. For Jennifer, she received the Children's Book Award for 1959.

== Awards ==
- 1959, Children's Book Award

== Published works ==
- Almost April (1956)
- The High White Wall (1957)
- Princess in Denim (1958)
- Jennifer (1959)
- Stranger in the House (1963)
- Ballerina on Skates (1964)
- River at Her Feet (1965)
- Girl in the Mirror (1966)
- Too Bad About the Haines Girl (1967)
- The Girl Who Knew Tomorrow (1970)
- Leslie (1972)
- Why Have the Birds Stopped Singing? (1974)
- Girl in the Shadows (1975)
