= The Evolution of Calpurnia Tate =

2009 historical young adult novel by Jacqueline Kelly

- First edition cover, illustrated by Beth White and designed by April Ward
- Author: Jacqueline Kelly
- Cover artist: Beth White, April Ward
- Language: English
- Genre: Young adult, Historical fiction
- Publisher: Henry Holt and Company
- Publication date: May 12, 2009 (1st edition)
- Publication place: United States
- Media type: Print (Hardcover)
- Pages: 340 (Hardcover) (1st edition)
- ISBN: 0-312-65930-X (1st edition)
- OCLC: 262143062 (1st edition)
- LC Class: PZ7.K296184 Evo 2009

The Evolution of Calpurnia Tate is a 2009 historical young adult novel by Jacqueline Kelly that received a 2010 Newbery Medal. It is the story of a young girl growing up in Texas.

== Plot ==
In the summer of 1899, Calpurnia Virginia Tate is about to turn twelve and worries about the adult responsibilities that loom on the horizon. She would much rather swim in the river near her family's pecan plantation just outside the tiny town of Fentress, Texas than learn to cook, knit, and play the piano. One day, noticing two different types of grasshoppers in the lawn around the house, Callie finally decides to find a copy of Charles Darwin's infamous book The Origin of Species. After a disastrous encounter with a lady librarian, Callie is forced to search for the illicit book elsewhere. Little does she know that there is a copy in her very own house in the personal library of her Grandfather. An imposing and distant figure, Callie must work up her courage to ask him about her grasshopper conundrum and relay her own theory about why the grasshoppers around the house are two different sizes. This begins an easy sort of friendship between granddaughter and grandfather. Soon, Callie is spending most of her time with Granddaddy, catching specimens of wildlife for his collection—including discovering a new type of hairy vetch—and learning about natural sciences at his side.

When she is not tramping and trapping with Granddaddy, Callie finds herself sadly incapable at the skills her mother so desperately tries to teach her. She can't cook anything other than soft-boiled eggs and cheese sandwiches. Her needlepoint is "straggly and pitiful." Her piano-playing, while adequate, is unexceptional. All of this is painfully obvious to poor Callie when she is compared to her best friend Lula. Lula is a perfect lady, excelling at all the pursuits at which Callie fails so miserably. In fact, her proper ladylike demeanor has three of Callie's six brothers falling in love with her during the course of the summer.

Callie fears that her free-roaming days may be at an end, though, when she receives a frightening Christmas gift: a book from her mother entitled “The Science of Housewifery.”

Throughout the novel, Callie must learn to balance her own independent and curious personality with the restrictions placed on a girl at the turn of the 19th century. As new inventions are presented in Callie's life, she adjusts and evolves, first with the wind machine her brother brings home, then with a marvelous new beverage called Coca-Cola. Ultimately, though, it is the introduction of the telephone in the small Texas town that symbolizes the changes ahead for Callie. As Granddaddy tells her, "The old century is dying, even as we watch. Remember this day." As the book ends, the 20th-century dawns, and a rare snow occurs, leaving the reader hopeful that it will bring with it new opportunities for the feisty young Calpurnia.

== Characters ==
- Calpurnia Virginia Tate: "Callie Vee" is the main character of the story. A curious, intelligent eleven-year-old determined to learn about the world around her even as she deals with the restrictions placed on a girl in the turn of the century.
- Granddaddy (Captain Tate): Calpurnia's paternal grandfather, Walter Tate. Through her interactions with him, Callie learns about natural history as well as her own potential and the coming changes in society. Granddaddy is quick friends with Callie just because she got up the courage to talk to him. He spends almost no time with her six brothers and doesn't know them apart. He gets Callie interested in Science which she immediately takes a liking to even though her mother doesn't approve.
- Alfred Tate: Calpurnia's father, who works at a cotton gin and isn't much mentioned in the story.
- Margaret Tate: Calpurnia's mother, at age 41 a strict and traditional woman who wants nothing more than to turn her daughter into a respectable lady. Housewifery is all she wants for Calpurnia and she spends much of her time teaching Callie to sew, cook, and perform other ladylike antiquities.
- Harry Tate: Calpurnia's oldest brother. Of the six Tate boys, Harry is kindest to Calpurnia, often going out of his way to make her smile.
- Sam Houston Tate: Calpurnia's second-oldest brother.
- Lamar Tate: Calpurnia's older brother who is sometimes a little rude. He wasn't born very long before Calpurnia and he sees her as a rival. Lamar is the voice of prejudice in the book and he dislikes "Yankees"- people from northern states. He looks down on Calpurnia and he makes it clear he believes it is the job of women to stay home and do chores. He takes Viola's food for granted and he is the only brother to openly insult Calpurnia's knitting. Lamar's slothfulness and total bluntness when it comes to gender expectations greatly contributes to Calpurnia's frustration with her status as a girl. He himself is extremely lazy and spoiled and he often becomes indignant when things don't go his way.
- Travis Tate: Calpurnia's younger brother. He has his kittens named after wild west outlaws. He is the most caring of them all (a little sensitive).
- Sul Ross Tate: Calpurnia's younger brother.
- Jim Bowie Tate: "J. B." is Calpurnia's younger brother and the youngest Tate child.
- Lula Gates: Calpurnia's best friend. A proper, ladylike girl, Lula wins prizes for her embroidery and prides herself on her many accomplishments. She wins the prize for several other events too. Lamar, Travis, and Sam Houston have a crush on her, but Callie is not one to keep a secret. Anyway, sometimes secrets just spill out.
- SanJuanna: The Tate family maid.
- Alberto: The Tate family helper. Husband to SanJuanna, he is not mentioned very much.
- Viola: The Tate family cook.
- Miss Brown: The piano teacher for Harry and Calpurnia.

== Style ==
The Evolution of Calpurnia Tate is an episodic, character driven novel.

== Adaptations ==
The Evolution of Calpurnia Tate was adapted into a musical play by Omri Schein and Daniel Lincoln. It premiered at the Lamb's Player Theatre in San Diego in 2024, where it received critical acclaim.

== Publication history ==
- The Evolution of Calpurnia Tate. Macmillan. 2009. ISBN 978-0-8050-8841-0.

Published in 2009 by Henry Holt and Company.

An audiobook version featuring the voice talents of Natalie Ross was published later in the same year by Brilliance Audio on CD. Ross's reading of The Evolution of Calpurnia Tate won the "Best Children's" title at the 2011 APA Audie Awards, as well as an Audiofile Magazine Earphones Award.

== Internal references ==
Each chapter begins with an epigraph from Charles Darwin's "On the Origin of Species."

The women mentioned are

- Marie Curie, was a Polish physicist and chemist. Mentioned for the discovery of the elements polonium and radium.
- Martha Maxwell, was an American naturalist, artist and taxidermist. Mentioned for the owl Otus asio maxwelliae named in her honor.
- Mary Anning, was an English fossil collector, dealer and paleontologist. Mentioned for the discovery of the ichthyosaur skeleton and the first pterosaur skeleton located outside Germany.
- Sofia Kovalévskaya, was a Russian mathematician. Mentioned for her contributions to analysis, partial differential equations and mechanics.
- Isabella Bird, was an English explorer, writer, photographer and naturalist. Mentioned for her travels to Hawaii, known in Europe as Sandwich Islands.

== Reception ==
Kirkus Reviews wrote "Readers will finish this witty, deftly crafted debut novel rooting for "Callie Vee" and wishing they knew what kind of adult she would become." while Publishers Weekly found that "Callie's transformation into an adult and her unexpected bravery make for an exciting and enjoyable read." and "Kelly's rich images and setting, believable relationships and a touch of magic take this story far." Common Sense Media described it as "a wonderful book about coming of age in a fascinating time, and that's what will leave an impression on tween and teen reader" and "It's easy to see why this coming-of-age story earned a Newbery Honor: Readers will find plenty to like." The New York Times found it "fits an old notion of literature for young people: It is slow-moving, morally grounded and filled with the young narrator’s careful descriptions of the natural world ..."

== Awards ==
It was the recipient of numerous awards including a 2010 Newbery Honor Award, and also honored with the IRA Children's Book Award, the North Carolina Young Adult Book Award, the TN YA Volunteer State Book Award ML, the Virginia M. Law Award., the Josette Frank Award and the Judy Lopez Book Award.

It was included in Chicago Public Library Best of the Best list, the Illinois Rebecca Caudill Young Readers Choice Award Master List, the Texas Lone Star Reading List and was a 2009 Junior Library Guild Selection.
