= Mary Stolz =

American writer of fiction for children and young adults (1920-2006)

- Born: March 24, 1920; Boston, Massachusetts
- Died: December 15, 2006 (aged 86); Longboat Key, Florida, US
- Occupation: Writer
- Writing career
- Period: 1950–1999
- Genres: Children's literature, young adult fiction
- Literary movement: First children's book The Leftover Elf (1952) First adult novel Truth and Consequence (1953)

Mary Stolz (born Mary Slattery, March 24, 1920 – December 15, 2006) was an American writer of fiction for children and young adults. She received the 1953 Child Study Association of America's Children's Book Award for In a Mirror, Newbery Honors in 1962 for Belling the Tiger and 1966 for The Noonday Friends, and her entire body of work was awarded the George G. Stone Recognition of Merit in 1982.

Her literary works range from picture books to young-adult novels. Although most of Stolz's works are fiction books, she made a few contributions to magazines such as Cosmopolitan, Ladies' Home Journal, and Seventeen.

== Biography ==
=== Early life ===
Mary Slattery was born on March 24, 1920, in Boston, Massachusetts. Raised in Manhattan, she attended the Birch Wathen School and served as assistant editor of her school magazine, Birch Leaves. She attended Columbia University from 1936 to 1938 and the Katherine Gibbs School.

=== Marriage and children ===
At age 18, she married and had one son, Bill. Chronic pain from arthritis worsened and she was housebound by 1949. During this time she began writing to occupy her time and ultimately drafted her first novel, To Tell Your Love (1950), on yellow legal pads. She divorced in 1956. Under doctor Thomas C. Jaleski's care, her disabling symptoms resolved and in 1965, she married Dr. Jaleski.

=== Career ===
To Tell Your Love brought Ms. Stolz into the stable of children's book editor Ursula Nordstrom. Mary Stolz admired Ursula Nordstrom, describing her as "a great editor...she reads a manuscript lovingly, but firmly, and I trust her judgement absolutely." She stayed with the Harper publishing company for much of her career, through its incarnations from Harper & Brothers to the present-day HarperCollins. Ms. Stolz wrote one book for adults, Truth and Consequence.

=== Death and afterward ===
Ms. Stolz died in Longboat Key, Florida.

== Works ==
=== Children's fiction ===
- The Leftover Elf (1952)
- Emmett's Pig (1959)
- A Dog on Barkham Street (1960) (Barkham Street #1)
- Belling The Tiger (1961) (Asa and Rambo #1)
- The Great Rebellion (1961) (Asa and Rambo #2)
- Frédou (1962)
- Pigeon Flight (1962)
- The Bully of Barkham Street (1963) (Barkham Street #2)
- Siri the Conquistador (1963), Harper & Row (Asa and Rambo #3)
- The Mystery of the Woods (1964)
- The Noonday Friends (1965)
- Maximilian's World (1966) (Asa and Rambo #4)
- A Wonderful, Terrible Time (1967)
- Say Something (1968)
- The Story of a Singular Hen and Her Peculiar Children (1969)
- The Dragons of the Queen (1969)
- Juan (1970)
- Lands End (1974)
- Ferris Wheel (1977)
- Cider Days (1978), ISBN 978-0-06-025837-5 (sequel to Ferris Wheel)
- Cat Walk (1983)
- The Explorer of Barkham Street (1985), ISBN 978-0-06-025976-1 (Barkham Street #3)
- Quentin Corn (1985)
- Night of Ghosts and Hermits: Nocturnal Life on the Seashore (1985)
- Ivy Larkin (1986)
- The Cuckoo Clock (1987)
- The Scarecrows and Their Child (1987)
- Storm in the Night (1988) (Thomas and Grandfather, book #1)
- Bartholomew Fair (1990)
- King Emmett the Second (1991) (sequel to Emmett's Pig)
- Go Fish (1991) (Thomas and Grandfather, book #2)
- Stealing Home (1992) (Thomas and Grandfather, book #3)
- Coco Grimes (1994) (Thomas and Grandfather, book #4)
- A Ballad of the Civil War (1997)
- Cezanne Pinto: A memoir (1997)
- Casebook of a Private (Cat’s) Eye (1999)

=== Young adult fiction ===
- To Tell Your Love (1950)
- The Sea Gulls Woke Me (1951)
- The Organdy Cupcakes (1951) - republished as Student Nurse
- In a Mirror (1953)
- Ready or Not (1953)
- Pray Love, Remember (1954)
- Rosemary (1955)
- The Beautiful Friend and Other Stories (1956)
- Hospital Zone (1956)
- The Day and the Way We Met (1956), ISBN 978-0-06-025836-8
- Because of Madeline (1957)
- Good-By My Shadow (1957)
- And Love Replied (1958)
- Second Nature (1958)
- Some Merry-Go-Round Music (1959)
- Wait for Me, Michael (1961)
- Who Wants Music on Monday? (1963)
- A Love, or a Season (1964) - first published as Two by Two
- And Love Replied (1966), ISBN 978-0-06-025786-6
- A Wonderful, Terrible Time (1967)
- By the Highway Home (1971), ISBN 978-0-06-025830-6
- Leap Before You Look (1972)
- The Edge of Next Year (1974)
- Cat in the Mirror (1975)
- Go and Catch a Flying Fish (1979), ISBN 978-0-06-025867-2
- What Time of Night Is It? (1981) (sequel to Go and Catch a Flying Fish)
- Pangur Ban (1988)

=== Adult fiction ===
- Truth and Consequence (1953)

== Awards ==
- 1953 Child Study Children's Book Award, In a Mirror
- 1962 American Library Association (ALA) Newbery Honor, Belling the Tiger
- Boys' Club Junior Book Award, The Bully of Barkham Street
- 1966 Newbery Honor, 'The Noonday Friends
- National Book Award finalist, The Edge of Next Year
- Boston Globe-Horn Book Award honor book, The Edge of Next Year
- 1982 George G. Stone Center Recognition Of Merit, entire body of work
- 1993 Kerlan Award
