= A Taste of Blackberries =

Book by Doris Buchanan Smith

- First edition
- Author: Doris Buchanan Smith
- Illustrator: Charles Robinson
- Language: English
- Genre: Children's novel
- Publisher: Thomas Y. Crowell Co. (now HarperCollins)
- Publication date: May 1973
- Publication place: United States
- Media type: Print
- Pages: 85 (paperback)
- Awards: ALA Notable Children's Book, Georgia Children's Author of the Year, Georgia Children's Book Award, Georgia Author of the Year, Josette Frank Award, Zilveren Griffel
- ISBN: 9780064402385

A Taste of Blackberries (HarperCollins, 1973) is a children's book by Doris Buchanan Smith.

== Background and reception ==
A Taste of Blackberries was rejected by several publishers who thought the main theme was too dark for children. Mortality had been a common subject in Victorian literature for young readers (see for example Oliver Twist), but books for young readers about death had become taboo until, in 1952, with the appearance of E. B. White's classic Charlotte's Web. Twenty years later, A Taste of Blackberries handled this difficult theme with great sensitivity earning much critical acclaim for its author.

Charlotte's Web had been the accepted template for addressing death in children's books for decades when A Taste of Blackberries appeared and in this story animals do not stand in for humans. Literary realism had taken hold, and Smith was at the vanguard of the movement, acquainting young readers with "the darker, harsher side of life." According to author and blogger Pauline Dewan; "Many writers believe that authors do not help children by sheltering them from the problems of the real world." Indeed, according to the author, many young readers told her "they liked it because it was sad." Interviewed for the Dictionary of Literary Biography, Smith recalled that A Taste of Blackberries was supposed to have been an adventure story, until an unwelcome plot twist entered the author's imagination. Smith locked the manuscript away in a drawer and refused to continue writing it. Ultimately, however, the writing did resume and Smith began to focus on the differences in the ways in which children and adults respond to mortality. Writing from the point of view of the child, Smith succeeded in giving her story the sensitivity for which it is highly praised.

As many as three publishers turned down A Taste of Blackberries before Thomas Y. Crowell Co., now HarperCollins, agreed to publish. It was released in May 1973 to wide acclaim. "Smith deals honestly and emphatically with the range of emotions", wrote Cynthia Westway in The Atlanta Journal, "the story is not an elegy; but a celebration of the continuity of the life-death cycle." In the Times Literary Supplement, David Rees wrote, "It will be difficult to find a children's book this autumn by a new author as good as Doris Buchanan Smith's A Taste of Blackberries . . . Smith's success lies in knowing how to handle the theme with exactly the right balance of sensitivity, humour and open emotion."

== Plot summary ==
As told from the point of view of the unnamed narrator, the story begins as he and his best friend Jamie go blackberry picking. We follow the boys as they take part in a series of exploits—some told in current narrative time, some revealed in poignant flashbacks—allowing the reader to witness their world and shared experience. When Jamie tragically dies as a result of an allergic reaction to bee stings, the narrator struggles to cope with denial, grief, guilt, and loneliness, before coming to terms with the loss. The story is set in a suburb of Washington, D.C., the author's birthplace.

== Characters ==
- Jamie is a "show-off and a clown". While he can be exasperating, his adventurous and resourceful nature earns the admiration of his best friend.
- The narrator, Jamie's appreciative audience and partner in fun, enjoys their friendship, even if, at times, Jamie can go too far.
- Heather, with red-gold hair, is the closest friend of both Jamie and the narrator.
- Jamie's mother cares for a family of three, including Jamie, four-year-old Martha, and an infant son.
- The narrator's mother and father care for the narrator and a college-age daughter who is away at summer camp as a counselor. They also have a son who is grown and married.
- Mrs. Houser, Jamie's next door neighbor, is tyrannical when it comes to her perfect lawn. The children in the neighborhood avoid her, and her lawn, if they possibly can.
- Mrs. Mullins' "secret garden" is off limits to most of the children in the neighborhood. The narrator feels privileged to be an exception, mainly because Mrs. Mullins and his mother are friends.

== Literary significance ==
"In dealing directly with the death of a child's playmate, it broke a taboo of twentieth-century American children's fiction", wrote Hugh T. Keenan, in the St. James Guide to Young Adult Writers. British author, lecturer and reviewer David Rees drew parallels between Charlotte's Web and A Taste of Blackberries in The Marble in the Water: Essays on Contemporary Writers of Fiction for Children and Young Adults (1980). He writes that "in A Taste of Blackberries we do have a story for young children in which death - sudden and inexplicable - is the main theme, and it is a book in which the characters are not talking animals." "The chief purpose of the book", Rees maintains, "is to write about death in a fashion that young readers can take, and in this Doris Buchanan Smith succeeds admirably." "These two authors are saying things that are necessary, and which help children to cope and to grow." A Taste of Blackberries is "one of the seminal children's books on the subject of death."

Smith won the Josette Frank Award, for "outstanding literary merit in which children or young people deal in a positive and realistic way with difficulties in their world and grow emotionally and morally", The author also won the Georgia Children's Book Award, the Children's Best Book Prize in the Netherlands (Zilveren Griffel), and was named Georgia Author of the Year, all for A Taste of Blackberries. In addition to 19 English language editions, the book has been translated into Dutch, Danish, French, Spanish and Japanese. A Taste of Blackberries was nominated for the prestigious Newbery Medal in 1974, and is an ALA Notable Children's Book.

"It blazed the way for the many other grief books that quickly followed, but few have approached the place of honor this one holds", wrote Jim Trelease in The Read-Aloud Handbook (Penguin Books, 2006).
