= Josette Frank Award =

American children's book award

The Josette Frank Award is an American children's literary award for fiction given annually by the Children's Book Committee at Bank Street College of Education. It "honors a book or books of outstanding literary merit in which children or young people deal in a positive and realistic way with difficulties in their world and grow emotionally and morally".

Gary D. Schmidt, winner of the 2024 Josette Frank Award for his novel The Labors of Hercules Beal, wrote in his acceptance letter, "If it can be said that awards such as the Josette Frank award fight for children, then Bank Street has, for many years, fought valiantly for children. You’ve held high standards of artistic excellence AND encouraged writers and illustrators who want to talk about the world that real children inhabit, even if it’s a pretty broken world that fills those pages. Just listing those titles suggests how the award has honored books that are honest accounts, that point to a world that doesn’t always value children and their experience, a world that often wars against them. But these books assert that in that world are children whose lives are mighty and lovely, and that their immediate experience is not always to be determined by the brokenness children find around them every single day. What could possibly be more important in today’s literature than a book that a child could pick up, read, and come away saying, 'I can grow too'?"

Known as the Children's Book Award from 1943 to 1997, it was renamed in honor of Josette Frank, the editor of many anthologies for children and a former Executive Director of the Child Study Association of America. The prize to the author of the book has been provided by the Florence L. Miller Memorial Fund.

The Josette Frank Award is one of several prominent awards that the Children's Book Committee gives each year. The Flora Stieglitz Straus Award, established in 1994, is presented to "a distinguished work of nonfiction that serves as an inspiration to young people." The Claudia Lewis Award, given for the first time in 1998, honors the best poetry book of the year. The Margaret Wise Brown Board Book Award, a biennial award, presented to published or adapted board books, was established in 2023 and honored books published in 2021-2022.

== Winners ==
=== Children's Book Award ===
Award Year	Award Distinction	Book Title (Year Published)	Author	Illustrator	Publisher
1943		Keystone Kids (1943)	John R. Tunis		Harcourt Brace
1944		The House (1944)	Marjorie Hill Allee	Helen Blair	Houghton Mifflin
1945		The Moved-Outers (1945)	Florence Cranell Means		Houghton Mifflin
1946		Heart of Danger (1946)	Howard Pease		Doubleday
1947		Judy's Journey (1947)	Lois Lenski		J. B. Lippincott & Co.
1948		The Big Wave (1948)	Pearl S. Buck	Utagawa Hiroshige and Katsushika Hokusai	John Day Company
1949		Paul Tiber: Forester (1949)	Maria Gleit	Ralph Ray	Charles Scribner's Sons
1950		Partners: The United Nations and Youth (1950)	Eleanor Roosevelt and Helen Ferris		Junior Literary Guild/Doubleday
1951	No Award				
1952		Jareb (1952)	Miriam Powell	Marc Simont	Thomas Y. Crowell
1952		Twenty and Ten (1952); later republished with minor edits as The Secret Cave (1969, 1973 Scholastic)	Claire Huchet Bishop	William Pène du Bois	Puffin
1953		In a Mirror (1953)	Mary Stolz		Harper
1954		High Road Home (1954)	William Corbin		Coward-McCann/Junior Literary Guild
1954		The Ordeal of the Young Hunter (1954)	Jonreed Lauritzen	Hoke Denetsosie	Little, Brown and Company
1955		Crow Boy	Taro Yashima		
1955		Plain Girl	Virginia Sorenson		
1956		The House of Sixty Fathers	Meindert DeJong	Maurice Sendak	Harper & Row
1957		Shadow Across the Campus	Helen Roney Sattler		Dodd Mead
1958		South Town	Lorenz Graham		
1959		Jennifer	Zoa Sherburne		
1960		Janine	Robin McKown		Messner
1961	Winner	The Road to Agra (translated from Norwegian by Evelyn Ramsden)	Aimee Sommerfelt	Ulf Aas	Criterion
1961	Special Citation	The Girl From Puerto Rico	Hila Colman		
1962		The Trouble With Terry	John Lexau		
1963	Winner	The Peaceable Revolution	Betty Schechter		
1963	Special Citation	The Rock and the Willow	Mildred Lee		
1964		The High Pasture	Ruth Peabody Harnden	Vee Guthrie	
1965		The Empty Schoolhouse	Natalie Savage Carlson	John Kauffman	
1966	Winner	Queenie Peavy	Robert Burch		
1966	Special Citation	Curious George Goes to the Hospital	Margret Rey and H. A. Rey	Margret Rey and H.A. Rey	Houghton Mifflin
1967		The Contender	Robert Lipsyte		
1968	Winner	What It's All About (translated from Russian by Joseph Barnes)	Vadim Frolic		Macmillan
1968	Special Citation	Where's Daddy? A Story about Divorce	Beth Goff	Susan Perl	Beacon Press
1969		The Empty Moat	Margaretha Shemin		Coward-McCann
1970		Migrant Girl	Carli Laklan		
1970		Rock Star	James Lincoln Collier		
1971	Winner	John Henry McCoy	Lillie D. Chaffin	Emanuel Schongut	
1971	Special Citation	The Pair of Shoes	Aline Glasgow	Symeon Shimin	Dial BFYR
1972		A Sound of Chariots	Mollie Hunter		
1973		A Taste of Blackberries	Doris Buchanan Smith		
1974		Luke Was There	Eleanor Clymer	Diane DeGroat	
1975		The Garden is Doing Fine	Carol Farley	Lynn Sweat	
1976		Somebody Else's Child	Roberta Silman	Chris Conover	
1977		The Pinballs	Betsy Byars		
1978		The Devil in Vienna	Doris Orgel		
1979		The Whipman is Watching	T. A. Dyer		
1980		A Boat to Nowhere	Maureen Wartski		
1981		A Spirit to Ride the Whirlwind	Athena Lord		
1982		Homesick: My Own Story	Jean Fritz	Margot Tomes	Putnam
1983	Winner	The Sign of the Beaver	Elizabeth George Speare		
1983	Special Citation	The Solomon System	Phyllis Reynolds Naylor		
1984		One-Eyed Cat	Paula Fox		
1985	Winner	With Westie and the Tin Man	C.S. Adler		Macmillan
1985	Special Citation	Ain't Gonna Study War No More: The Story of America's Peace Seekers	Milton Meltzer		Harper and Row
1986		Journey to Jo'burg	Beverley Naidoo		
1987		Rabble Starkey	Lois Lowry		
1988	Winner	The Most Beautiful Place in the World	Ann Cameron	Thomas Allen	Knopf
1988	Special Citation	December Stillness	Mary Downing Hahn		
1989		Shades of Gray	Carolyn Reeder		
1990		Secret City, USA	Felice Holman		
1991		Shadow Boy	Susan E. Kirby		
1992		Blue Skin of the Sea	Graham Salisbury		
1993		Make Lemonade	Virginia Euwer Wolff		
1994		Earthshine	Theresa Nelson		
1995	Winner	Music from a Place Called Half Moon	Jerrie Oughton		
1995	Special Citation	The Watsons Go to Birmingham: 1963	Christopher Paul Curtis		Delacorte Press
1996		The Cuckoo's Child	Suzanne Freeman		

=== Josette Frank Award ===
Award Year	Book Title (Year Published)	Author	Illustrator	Publisher	Award Distinction
1997	No Turning Back: A Novel of South Africa	Beverley Naidoo			
1998	My Louisiana Sky	Kimberly Willis Holt			
1999	None				
2000	Figuring Out Frances	Gina Willner-Pardo			
2001	Because of Winn-Dixie	Kate DiCamillo			
2002	Amber Was Brave, Essie Was Smart	Vera B. Williams			
2003	Goddess of Yesterday	Caroline B. Cooney			Winner
2003	Jericho Walls	Kristi Collier			Special Citation
2004	The Goose Girl	Shannon Hale			
2005	Ida B and Her Plans to Maximize Fun, Avoid Disaster, and (Possibly) Save the World	Katherine Hannigan			
2006	Each Little Bird That Sings	Deborah Wiles			
2007	Clementine	Sara Pennypacker	Marla Frazee		Winner
2007	The Manny Files	Christian Burch			Special Citation
2008	Home of the Brave	Katherine Applegate			
2009	After Tupac and D Foster	Jacqueline Woodson			
2010	The Evolution of Calpurnia Tate	Jacqueline Kelly			Winner
2010	Where the Mountain Meets the Moon	Grace Lin			Special Citation
2011	Out of My Mind	Sharon Draper			
2012	Bluefish	Pat Schmatz			
2013	Wonder	R. J. Palacio			
2014	Rose Under Fire	Elizabeth Wein		Little, Brown Books for Young Readers	
2015	Rain Reign	Ann M. Martin		Feiwel & Friends	for younger readers
2015	I'll Give You the Sun	Jandy Nelson		Dial BFYR	for older readers
2016	The War That Saved My Life	Kimberly Brubaker Bradley		Dial BFYR	
2017	The Secret Life of Lincoln Jones (2016)	Wendelin Van Draanen		Knopf Books for Young Readers	
2018	Piecing Me Together (2017)	Renée Watson		Bloomsbury USA Children's	
2019	A Heart in a Body in the World (2018)	Deb Caletti		Atheneum Books for Young Readers	
2020	When the Ground Is Hard (2019)	Malla Nunn		G. P. Putnam's Sons	
2021	When Stars Are Scattered (2020)	Victoria Jamieson and Omar Mohamed	Victoria Jamieson (illustrator) and Imam Geddy (color)	Dial BFYR	
2022	Milo Imagines the World (2021)	Matt de la Peña	Christian Robinson	G. P. Putnam's Sons	for younger readers
2022	Firekeeper's Daughter (2021)	Angeline Boulley		Macmillan	for older readers
2023	I Must Betray You (2022)	Ruta Sepetys		Philomel Books	
2024	The Labors of Hercules Beal (2023)	Gary D. Schmidt		Clarion/HarperCollins	
