= Josette Frank =

American children's literature expert (1893–1989)

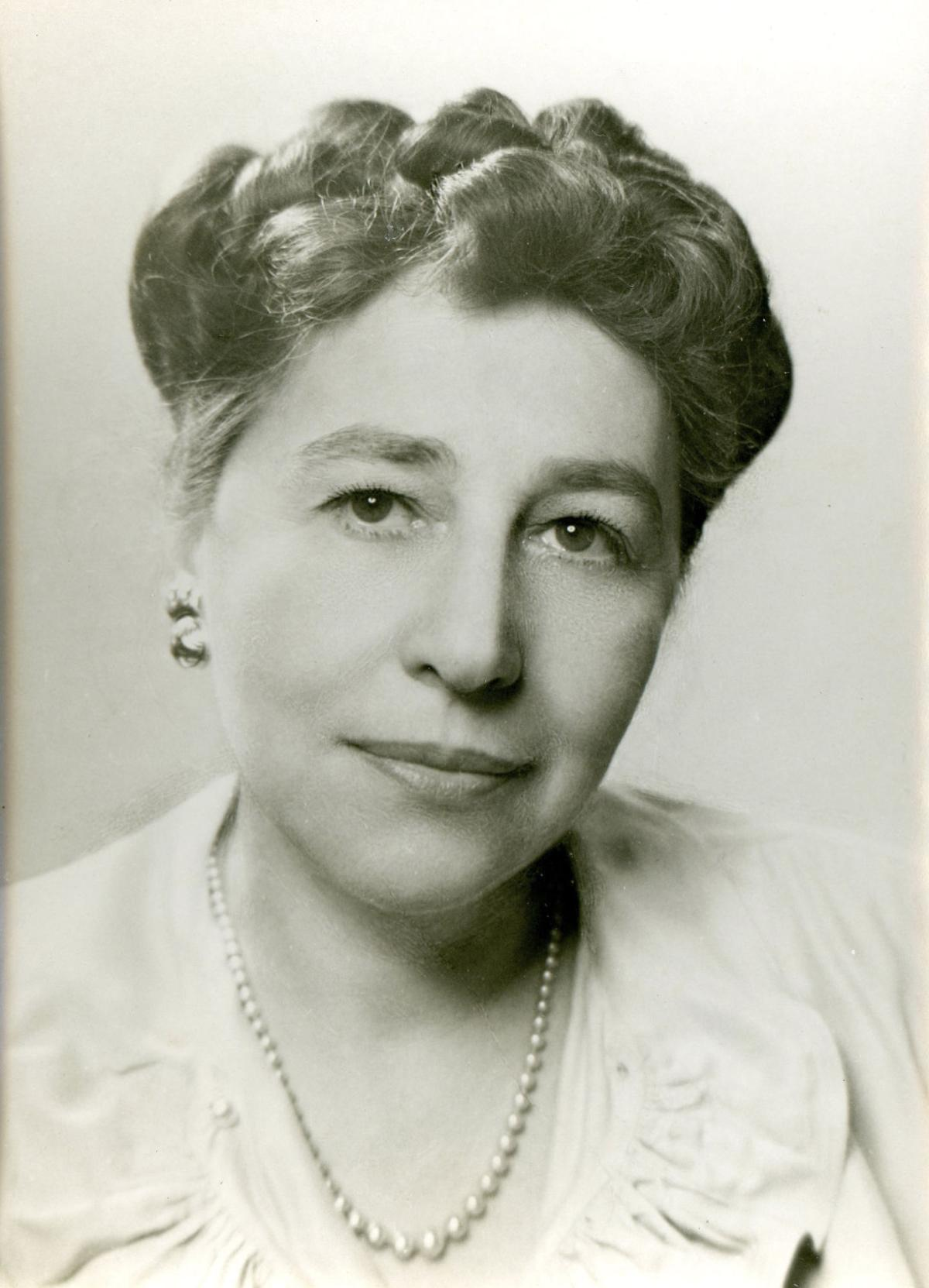
- A portrait of Frank, year unknown
- Born: March 27, 1893; New York City, U.S.
- Died: September 9, 1989 (aged 96); Alexandria, Virginia, U.S.
- Occupations: Children's literature advocate and editor
- Known for: Children's Reading Consultant, Child Study Association of America; Namesake of Josette Frank Award
- Notable work: What Books For Children? Your Children's Reading Today

Josette Frank (March 27, 1893 – September 9, 1989) was an American children's literature expert and educational consultant. Frank spent most of her adult life working for the Child Study Association of America (CSAA), a leading authority on child development, from the 1920s to the 1960s. Frank was engaged as the CSAA's child reading expert and published a parental literary guide titled What Books For Children? in 1937, with a new edition in 1941. Due to her progressive views about parental supervision of children's reading, Frank became one of the significant pro-comics voices during the American anti-comics movement of the 1950s, for which she received praise and criticism.

== Early life ==
Frank was born on March 27, 1893, in Manhattan, New York City, into a family of secular Jews. Her father, Leo, owned a successful furniture business. As a young girl, she was involved in early feminism and the Women's Land Army. She got her first job when she was 19, working as a secretary for Theodore Roosevelt. She also investigated child labor and worked with poor immigrants in New York City's Lower East Side, while living in the Greenwich Village neighborhood.

== Child Study Association of America ==
=== Early years ===
Frank first became involved with the Federation For Child Study, the group that became the CSAA, in 1923. Frank served as an assistant editor for their magazine, Child Study. Her first prominent advocacy for child-guided reading came in 1936, in an issue of Parents Magazine: "We can best guide our children's reading if we let our children's reading guide us instead of trying to mold them into preconceived patterns of 'what the well-read child should read,' let us rather encourage them to find their way to real experiences of their own in the vast world of books."

Reflecting her increasing familiarity with children's literature, CSAA director Sidonie Matsner Gruenberg suggested that Frank publish a book recommending children's literature to parents. Frank's book, What Books For Children?, came out first in 1937, and Frank promoted the book at the New York Times National Book Fair, held at Rockefeller Center in November of that year. The fair brought Frank's progressive ideas about oversight of children's reading to a much larger audience, and Frank reassured parents that their children's morals were not shaped to a great amount by reading material. The article was one of the first times Frank discussed children's readership of comic books, saying:

My little girl, now 12 years old, is reading Van Loon's The Arts, but her favorite reading is the Sunday colored funnies. It seems to me that a child's interest in these 'funnies' has nothing to do with her intelligence quotient. One great reason may be that in the comic strips something is happening very fast and always comes to a dramatic close. I think that children like that swift, sudden action. At any rate the question is not whether children should read the comics, but how are you going to stop them?

— "Latitude Urged for Child Reader", The New York Times, November 11, 1937, p. 29.

In a response to a letter critical of Frank's liberalized views on children's reading, Frank noted that children could never be wholly protected from forbidden literature by parental oversight alone, saying "...we know that prohibiting has ever had the effect of enhancing the allure of the forbidden."

== Comics advocacy ==
After Chicago Daily News writer Sterling North condemned comic books as "graphic insanity" and "sex-horror serials" in one of his columns, comic book companies rushed to save their image and prove that they were not as harmful as North made them out to be. National Comics Publications managing editor Whitney Ellsworth sent out a memo to his staff that read:

It is our desire to publish our magazines in strict adherence to accepted standards of decency and good taste. The following code must be followed both as to spirit and to letter; there are no exceptions.

Writers and artists are advised to confine their contributions to material that is completely above any possible criticism. Our requirements are rigid, and much time and effort will be saved if they are strictly adhered to. In this rapidly growing field, many recent comic books have fallen far short of our standards. We have no intention of catering to that fringe of the public which forms the market for vulgar, obscene or vicious literature. Our obligation to the youth of America and parents requires us to publish only wholesome material. We wish to point out that this code of editorial practice has been prepared with the advice and assistance of: Dr. Robert Thorndike, Teachers College, Columbia University. Miss Josette Frank, Staff Advisor to the Children's Book Committee, Child Study Association of America. Dr. Ruth Perl, Associate Member, American Psychological Association.

Dr. C. Bowie Millican, Department of English Literature, New York University.

In 1941, she joined National's editorial advisory board in a part-time position. Her name, along with the rest of the board, was published in every National comic book starting in mid-1941. Members were paid regardless of their input, and they were usually sent sample story outlines to review rather than finished comic books. In 1943, she sent a letter criticizing sexual and bondage imagery in Wonder Woman stories to National's publisher, Max Gaines.

In the new chapter on comic books published in Frank's 1941 2nd edition of What Books For Children?, Frank became more candid about her comic book advocacy, posing a question towards understanding children's interest in comics. She reveals one of the main aspects of parental frustration with comic books: "the intensity of the children's absorption in these paper-covered concentrations of color and motion leaves us aghast." Much of the chapter focuses on explaining the appeal of comics to a decidedly parental audience. Frank reasons that children have always craved adventure, but questions on a deeper level why children ostensibly nurtured and protected from danger craved stories (presumably) filled with "bloodcurdling horror, mystery, violence, and sudden death".

In the end, Frank reasoned that

Perhaps it is precisely because they are so carefully protected that they crave this type of reading. In most children's lives today there is all too little opportunity for any real adventuring. Each day is painfully like the last—and home is a place whose daily routine leaves little room for the unexpected. How else can these protected children experience the thrill of danger so vicariously? Where can they find adventure so swift, so daring, so breath-taking—and so unhampered by the limits of probability—as in the comics or in movie and radio thrillers. And what safer was to enjoy the thrills of danger than knowing, with deep certainty, good will triumph over evil—by no matter what improbable means. For the children know full well in these tales their hero will survive whatever threats and trials beset his path, and the villain will be thoroughly punished for his evil-doing, often perishing to the very trick which he had prepared to destroy the hero. Here, surely is the most soul-satisfying justice!

— Josette Frank, What Books for Children? 2nd ed., 1941, pp. 72–73.

After the publication of What Books For Children?, the CSAA featured two articles by Frank in their Spring 1942 and Summer 1943 issues of Child Study, the organization's magazine. Frank's first article was largely a rehashing of the book's chapter, while the second demarcated and analyzed different types of comic books.

By 1950, reading comics books was widely considered to be harmful to children. Hilde Mosse, the acting physician in charge of the Lafargue Clinic, used Frank's position on the advisory board to discredit her pro-comic writings published in the Journal of Educational Sociology at a 1950 symposium on comics held at a New York school. In 1954, the Senate held hearings to investigate a link between comic books and juvenile delinquency. During the proceedings, Senator Estes Kefauver grilled CSAA president Gunnar Dybwad over Frank's links to the comic book industry, suggesting, as Mosse had, that her writing was not credible due to her receiving pay from the industry.

== Personal life and death ==
Frank married Henry Jacobs in 1923 but kept her maiden name, which was a rare decision at the time. Frank refused to open mail addressed to her using her husband's name, and would return unopened letters saying that no person with that name lived there. Her husband died in 1941. They had two children, a daughter named Judith and a son named Stephen. In addition to her work with the CSAA, she also served on committees for the National Conference of Christians and Jews and the National Committee for Program Services of the Campfire Girls.

Frank died of pneumonia on September 9, 1989, in a nursing home in Alexandria, Virginia.

== Legacy ==
As part of the CSAA, Frank was the first editor of the Children's Book Committee at the Bank Street College of Education and helped choose the recipient of the annual Children's Book Award for children's fiction since its inception in 1944. In 1997, the award was renamed in her honor.

== In popular culture ==
Connie Britton portrayed Frank in the 2017 film Professor Marston and the Wonder Women, where she is depicted as a comics-critical moralist leading a National Comics Publications hearing against the sexual content of William Moulton Marston's Wonder Woman comics. The conservative image of Frank in the film was criticized by her granddaughter, Yereth Rosen: "Real Josette was pretty much the opposite of a Focus-on-the-Family-type arch-conservative Christian, for reasons beyond the fact that she was not a Christian."

== Publications ==
- What Books for Children?: Guideposts for Parents – a 363-page handbook first published by Doubleday, Doran & Co in 1937. A revised edition was released in 1941, with additional chapters on radio and comic books.
- "Let's Look at the Comics" – An introductory primer published in Child Study (the CSAA's journal) for parents on comic books and common criticisms.
- "Looking at the Comics" with Flora Stieglitz Straus – Another Child Study article, this one a breakdown of various types and styles of comic books with evaluation of their appropriateness for children.
- "What's in the Comics?" – a 9-page article published in the December 1944 edition of The Journal of Educational Sociology.
- Your Child's Reading Today – published by Doubleday in 1954.
- Comics, TV, Radio, Movies--what Do They Offer Children? – a 28-page booklet published by the Public Affairs Committee in 1955.
- Television: How to Use it Wisely with Children – a 28-page booklet first published by the Child Study Association of America in 1959.
