= Florence Crannell Means =

American writer

- Born: May 15, 1891; Baldwinsville, New York, U.S.
- Died: November 19, 1980 (aged 89); Boulder, Colorado, U.S.
- Occupation: Writer
- Notable works: The Moved-Outers (1945)
- Notable awards: Children's Book Award (1945)
- Spouse: Carl Bell Means

Florence Crannell Means (May 15, 1891 – November 19, 1980) was an American writer for children and young adults. For her 1945 novel, The Moved-Outers, she received a Newbery Medal honor award and the Child Study Association of America Children's Book Award.

== Biography ==
Florence Crannell Means was born May 15, 1891, in Baldwinsville, New York.

In 1946 her novel about Japanese internment, The Moved-Outers, won a Newbery Medal honor award and the Children's Book Award (now Josette Frank Award) from the Child Study Association of America.

In his "Without Evasion" essay in The Horn Book Magazine, Jan/Feb 1945, Howard Pease says: "Only at infrequent intervals do you find a story intimately related to this modern world, a story that takes up a modern problem and thinks it through without evasion. Of our thousands of books, I can find scarcely half a dozen that merit places on this almost vacant shelf in our libraries; and of our hundreds of authors, I can name only three who are doing anything to fill this void in children's reading. These three authors – may someone present each of them with a laurel wreath – are Doris Gates, John R. Tunis, and Florence Crannell Means." Many of Means' books dealt with the experiences of minorities in America, such as Japanese Americans in The Moved-Outers and African Americans in Shuttered Windows.

She married Carl Bell Means and died November 19, 1980, in Boulder, Colorado.

== Works ==
- Rafael and Consuelo with Harriet Louise Fullen, Friendship Press, 1929
- A Candle in the Mist: A Story for Girls, Houghton Mifflin Company, 1931 (Janey Grant Series #1)
- Ranch and Ring, Houghton Mifflin Company, 1932 (Janey Grant Series #2)
- A Bowlful of Stars, A Story of the Pioneer West, Houghton Mifflin, 1934 (Janey Grant Series #3)
- Penny for Luck: A Story of the Rockies, Houghton Mifflin Company, 1935
- Tangled Waters, Houghton Mifflin, 1936
- Shuttered Windows, Houghton Mifflin Company, 1938
- Adella Mary in Old New Mexico, Houghton Mifflin Company, 1939
- The Moved-Outers, Houghton Mifflin, 1945; reprint Walker, 1993, ISBN 978-0-8027-7386-9
- Great Day in the Morning, Houghton Mifflin, 1946
- The Silver Fleece: A Story of the Spanish in New Mexico, Winston, 1950
- Hetty of the Grande Deluxe, Houghton Mifflin, 1951
- The Rains Will Come, illustrator Fred Kabotie, Houghton Mifflin, 1954
- Sagebrush Surgeon, Friendship Press, NY, 1955
- Knock at the Door, Emmy, Houghton Mifflin, 1956
- Reach for a Star, Houghton Mifflin, 1957
- Emmy and the Blue Door, Houghton Mifflin, 1959
- Sunlight on the Hopi Mesas: The Story of Abigail E. Johnson, Judson Press, 1960
- Tolliver, Houghton Mifflin, 1963
- Carvers' George: A Biography of George Washington Carver, illustrator Harve Stein, E.M. Hale, 1963
- It Takes All Kinds, Houghton Mifflin, 1964
- Our Cup is Broken, Houghton Mifflin, 1969
