= Katherine Hannigan =

American artist and novelist

- Born: 1962 (age 63–64); Lockport, New York, U.S.
- Writing career
- Period: 2004–present
- Website: www.harperchildrens.com/authorintro/index.asp?authorid=27798

Katherine Hannigan (born 1962) is a children's and young adults' writer.

== Biography ==
Hannigan was born in Lockport, New York in 1962. She has undergraduate degrees in mathematics, education, and painting, and a Master of Fine Arts in studio art. She has worked as assistant professor of art and design and as an education coordinator for Head Start. She currently lives in a small town in Iowa.

== Works ==
- Ida B. (2004)
- Emmaline and the Bunny - (2009)
- True... (sort of) - (2011)
- Dirt + Water = Mud - (2016)

== Awards ==
- 2004 Josette Frank Award, Ida B
- 2004 Mitten Award, Ida B
