= Kimberly Brubaker Bradley =

American children's and young adult author

- Born: Fort Wayne, Indiana, U.S.
- Education: Smith College (BA)
- Occupation: Author
- Writing career
- Period: 1998-Present
- Notable works: Jefferson's Sons: A Founding Father's Secret Children; The War That Saved My Life; The War I Finally Won; Fighting Words
- Notable awards: Newbery Honor; 2016 The War That Saved My Life; Newberry Honor 2021 Fighting Words
- Website: kimberlybrubakerbradleycom.wordpress.com

Kimberly Brubaker Bradley (born June 24, 1967) is an American children's and young adult book author. In 2016, her children's book The War That Saved My Life received the Newbery Honor Award and was named to the Bank Street Children's Book Committee's Best Books of the Year List with an "Outstanding Merit" distinction and won the Committee's Josette Frank Award for fiction.

== Biography ==
Kimberly attended Smith College in Northampton, Massachusetts and received a degree in chemistry in 1989. Bradley was always fascinated with chemistry, but when her sophomore roommate convinced her to take an Introduction to Children's Literature course, she immediately loved it. Her instructor, the Newbery medalist Patricia MacLachlan encouraged Bradley to continue writing and helped her learn more about writing for children.

During college, she began writing by working as a freelance writer for equestrian magazines. Bradley's knowledge of horses influenced some of her children's literature, such as the award-winning The War That Saved My Life. After college, Bradley married her high school sweetheart, Bart Bradley. While he attended medical school, she worked primarily as a research chemist, while still writing as a part-time editor for equestrian magazines and creatively whenever she could.

== Career ==
Her first novel, Ruthie's Gift, was published in 1998 and she has continued to publish 17 books catered to children and young adults. She has won numerous awards for her stories as well as many other literary honors.

=== Ruthie's Gift ===
Bradley's first novel is set in a small Indiana farming community at the start of World War I, and follows the story of Ruthie, an 8-year-old tomboy who strives to form a stronger sense of self and selflessness during a particularly dramatic year in her life: the year her sixth brother is born, the year she makes her first friends (twin girls), the year she almost dies of pneumonia, the year the war takes one of her brothers from her.

=== Jefferson's Sons: A Founding Father's Secret Children ===
Bradley's 2011 book, Jefferson's Sons: A Founding Father's Secret Children, received 5 starred book reviews and numerous accolades. The story is told by three young boys, two of whom were the children of Thomas Jefferson and Sally Hemings, one of his slaves. Although Jefferson's children get special treatment from him, they are still his slaves and cannot mention who their father is to anyone. The lighter-skinned children have a chance to convert to white society, but the children who look more like their mother do not. As each child continues to grow up, the distinction between freedom and slavery becomes even more prominent.

=== The War That Saved My Life ===
Aimed at middle-school readers, The War That Saved My Life follows 10-year-old Ada and her little brother Jamie, who are in the middle of London during World War II. When Jamie is shipped out of London to escape the bombings, Ada sneaks off with him to escape their cruel mother. Ada has never left her one-room flat before because her mother was ashamed of Ada's clubbed foot.

Ada, Jamie, and Susan Smith, the children's caretaker in the country, all begin a new adventure together. Ada then learns how to ride a pony named Butter, and finds a friend named Maggie, while also overcoming her feelings of worthlessness. Ada gains the courage needed to fight her own battles and the much-needed love of a mother figure. Overall, this story has been described as, “the rare novel that can take something as massive as a world war and distill it to its human essence.”

=== The War I Finally Won (The War That Saved My Life #2) ===
In this follow-up novel, Brubaker Bradley's story of Ada and Jamie continues in the English countryside during WWII. Their mother dies in the munition factory in London. They are now safe with Susan Smith and Jamie is adjusting to safety well, but Ada struggles. Throughout this story, Ada becomes close with the Thorntons in this story as the war continues and circumstances change.

=== Fighting Words ===
Published in 2020, Brubaker creates a story centered around Delicious, a.k.a. Della, who is a 10-year-old girl who has had her already difficult life turned upside down after her "step-dad" attempted to molest her. Della tries to heal in her new foster home, but suffers more as she watches her older sister Suki who was the victim of years of sexual abuse struggle to overcome the trauma. This is an endearing story that handles a difficult topic delicately making it accessible to younger audience than other books with similar themes.

== Awards and honors ==
- 1998 Publisher's Week “Flying Start” Award for Ruthie's Gift
- 2011 Kirkus Reviews Best Children's Books of 2011 for Jefferson's Sons: A Founding Father's Secret Children
- 2012 Bank Street Children's Book Committee's Best Books of the Year with "Outstanding Merit" for Jefferson's Sons: A Founding Father's Secret Children
- 2012 ALA Notable Children's Book for Jefferson's Sons: A Founding Father's Secret Children
- 2012 NCSS Notable Social Studies Trade Books for Young People for Jefferson's Sons: A Founding Father's Secret Children
- 2016 Newbery Honor for The War That Saved My Life
- 2016 Josette Frank Award Winner and Bank Street Children's Book Committee's Best Books of the Year with "Outstanding Merit" for The War That Saved My Life
- 2016 Schneider Family Book Award for The War That Saved My Life
- 2016 #1 New York Times bestseller for The War That Saved My Life
- 2018 Bank Street Children's Book Committee's Best Books of the Year with "Outstanding Merit" for The War I Finally Won
- 2020 Kirkus Prize Finalist for Fighting Words
- 2021 Newbery Honor for Fighting Words
- 2021 Bank Street Children's Book Committee's Best Books of the Year with "Outstanding Merit" for Fighting Words

== Publications ==
- Ruthie's Gift (1998)
- One-of-a-Kind Mallie (1999)
- Weaver's Daughter (2000)
- Halfway to the Sky (2002)
- Favorite Things (2003)
- The President's Daughter (2004)
- For Freedom: The Story of A French Spy (2005)
- Ballerino Nate (2006)
- The Perfect Pony (2007)
- Leap of Faith (2007)
- The Lacemaker and the Princess (2007)
- Jefferson's Sons: A Founding Father's Secret Children (2013)
- The War That Saved My Life (2015)
- The War I Finally Won (2017)
- Fighting Words (2020)
- She Persisted: Rosalind Franklin (2022) (with Chelsea Clinton)
- The Night War (2024)

== Personal life ==
Bradley currently lives in Bristol, Tennessee.
