= Hila Colman =

American writer of children's literature (1909–2008)

- Born: July 21, 1909; New York City, New York, U.S.
- Died: May 15, 2008 (aged 98)
- Occupation: Writer
- Language: English
- Education: Radcliffe College
- Genre: Children's and young adult fiction
- Notable awards: Josette Frank Award, Garden State Children's Book Awards

Hila Colman (July 21, 1909 – May 15, 2008) was an American author whose career spanned four decades and included magazine articles, novels, and television. Colman principally wrote for children and young adults, authoring more than 70 books. She was also a writer for episodes of NBC Matinee Theater and ABC Afterschool Special.

== Early life and education ==
Hill Colman was born in New York City on July 21, 1909, to Harry and Sarah Crayder. She attended Calhoun School, then Radcliffe College.

== Career ==
Colman began her career writing at the National War Relief Agency. In 1947, she published her first article in The Saturday Evening Post, an opinion piece about the role fathers should play in home life. She continued writing for a number of women's magazines before turning to novels. Her 1977 autobiographical work, Hanging On, details caring for her husband during the final year of his life following a stroke.

In all, Colman wrote more than 70 books and a few television episodes.

== Personal life and death ==
Colman was politically liberal and was involved in several political movements.

Colman was married and widowed four times: Leon Meadow, Saul Ochs, Louis Colman, and Joel Rothman. She also had at least two children (Jonathan and James Colman), nine grandchildren, and eleven grandchildren.

Hila Colman died in Bridgewater, Connecticut, on May 15, 2008, at the age of 98.

== Awards ==
Year	Award	Work	Result	Refs
1962	Child Study Association of America Children's Book Award	The Girl from Puerto Rico	Winner	
1962	Josette Frank Awards	The Girl from Puerto Rico	Special Citation	
1976	Garden State Children's Book Awards	Nobody Has to Be a Kid Forever	Winner	

== Selected works ==
=== Children's ===
- Peter's Brownstone House (1963)
- The Boy Who Couldn't Make Up His Mind (1965)
- Ethan's Favorite Teacher (1975)
- Rich and Famous Like My Mom (1988)

=== Novels ===
- The Big Step (1957)
- A Crown for Gina (1958)
- Julie Builds Her Castle (1959)
- The Best Wedding Dress (1960)
- The Girl From Puerto Rico (1961)
- Mrs. Darling's Daughter (1962)
- Phoebe's First Campaign (1963)
- Classmates by Request (1965)
- Car Crazy Girl (1967)
- Mixed-Marriage Daughter (1968)
- Claudia, Where Are You? (1969)
- The Happenings at North End School (1970)
- Daughter of Discontent (1971)
- End of the Game (1971)
- The Family and the Fugitive (1972)
- Benny the Misfit (1973)
- Chicano Girl (1973)
- Diary of a Frantic Kid Sister (1973)
- Friends and Strangers on Location (1974)
- After the Wedding (1975)
- That's the Way It Is, Amigo (1975)
- The Amazing Miss Laura (1976)
- Nobody Has to Be a Kid Forever (1976)
- Sometimes I Don't Love My Mother (1977)
- The Case of the Stolen Bagels (1978)
- Tell Me No Lies (1978)
- Rachel's Legacy (1978)
- The Secret Life of Harold the Birdwatcher (1978)
- Ellie's Inheritance (1979)
- What's the Matter with the Dobsons? (1980)
- Accident (1981)
- The Family Trap (1982)
- Not for Love (1983)
- Triangle of Love (1985)
- Weekend Sisters (1985)

=== Non-fiction ===
- The Country Weekend Cookbook (1961)
- A Career in Medical Research (1967)
- Beauty, Brains, and Glamour: A Career in Magazine Publishing (1968)
- City Planning: What, How, and When (1971)
- Hanging On (1977)

=== Television ===
- Matinee Theater, 1955
- "The Unforgivable Secret", ABC Afterschool Specials, 1982

=== Magazines ===
- "Husbands Are No Good at Home", Saturday Evening Post, August 30, 1947
