= Doris Buchanan Smith =

American novelist (1934–2002)

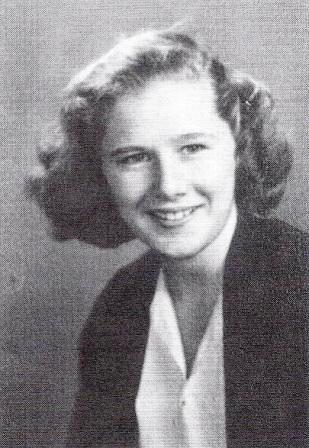
- Born: June 1, 1934; Washington, D.C.
- Died: August 8, 2002 (aged 68); Jacksonville, Florida
- Occupation: Novelist
- Spouses: R. Carroll Smith (1954–1977; divorced; 5 children including one adopted and many foster children); Dr. William J. "Bill" Curtis (1990–1997; his death)
- Writing career
- Period: 1973–2002
- Genre: Children's literature
- Notable works: A Taste of Blackberries, 1973, Return to Bitter Creek, 1986, Last Was Lloyd, 1981, Voyages, 1989
- Notable awards: ALA Notable Children's Book, Georgia Children's Author of the Year, Georgia Children's Book Award, Georgia Author of the Year, Josette Frank Award, Parents' Choice Award, Publishers Weekly Best Book of the Year, School Library Journal Best Book of the Year, Zilveren Griffel
- Website: www.dorisbuchanansmith.com

Doris Buchanan Smith (June 1, 1934 – August 8, 2002) was an American author of award-winning Children's books, including A Taste of Blackberries (HarperCollins, 1973).

== Works ==
A Taste of Blackberries by Doris Buchanan Smith. Illustrated by Charles Robinson. First Edition.

Doris Buchanan Smith's, A Taste of Blackberries (HarperCollins, 1973), earned critical acclaim as well as comparisons with Charlotte's Web (HarperCollins, 1952). In the early 1970s, along with authors such as Katherine Paterson and Judy Blume, Smith established "a solid reputation for accessible fiction with serious themes." A Taste of Blackberries "deals honestly and emphatically with the range of emotions," wrote Cynthia Westway in The Atlanta Journal, 1973, "... the story is not, however an elegy; but a celebration of the continuity of the life-death cycle." David Rees, in The Times Literary Supplement, 1975, declared, "It will be difficult to find a children's book this autumn by a new author as good as Doris Buchanan Smith's A Taste of Blackberries." "It blazed the way for the many other grief books that quickly followed, but few have approached the place of honor this one holds," wrote Jim Trelease in The Read-Aloud Handbook (Penguin, Sixth Edition, 2006).

A Taste of Blackberries won the Josette Frank Award, the Georgia Children's Book Award, and the Best Children's Book Prize for a translated work in the Netherlands (Zilveren Griffel). It is an ALA Notable Children's Book, a Newbery Medal finalist, and has been translated into Dutch, Danish, French, Spanish, and Japanese. In a review for the School Library Journal (2002), Ann Welton wrote that Smith's book is "rightfully viewed, along with Katherine Paterson's Bridge to Terabithia, 1977, as one of the seminal children's books on the subject of death."

Return to Bitter Creek, 1986, received the Parents' Choice Award, and was named a School Library Journal and Publishers Weekly Best Book of the Year. Last Was Lloyd, 1981, was a School Library Journal Best Book of the Year. Smith also wrote Voyages, 1980, The First Hard Times, 1983 and The Pennywhistle Tree, 1991, all named ALA Notable Children's Books by the American Library Association. Smith's last published work was Remember the Red-Shouldered Hawk, in 1994.

== Biography ==
Doris Jean Buchanan was born June 1, 1934, in Washington, D.C., to parents Charles A. and Flora R. Buchanan. At age two she began memorizing nursery rhymes her mother read to her and then inventing stories of her own. At nine, her family moved from the nation's capital, to Atlanta, Georgia. Noticing that she had a flair for storytelling, a sixth-grade teacher, Miss Pruitt (to whom A Taste of Blackberries is dedicated), asked Doris if she planned on becoming a writer one day. The suggestion resonated and a "closet" writer was born. The next year her parents divorced, leaving Doris and her brothers Bob and Jim to be reared by their mother. While attending South Georgia College, Douglas, Georgia, Doris met R. Carroll Smith. Neither of them completed their courses, and in December 1954 they were married. The Smiths settled in Brunswick, Georgia, where they raised four children of their own and cared for dozens of foster children, including one whom they reared from age 12 to adulthood.

After the author's youngest child entered public school, Smith began to focus on her writing, joining a writers group and attending writer's conferences while honing her craft. Smith's first completed novel was never published, but her second, A Taste of Blackberries, became a children's classic, which has remained in print since 1973. Smith's marriage ended in divorce in 1977, and she remained single until meeting her second husband, Dr. William J. "Bill" Curtis, an associate professor of education at the University of Colorado at Colorado Springs, while at a writer's conference in Hawaii. They were married from 1990 until Curtis died in 1997 from ALS (Amyotrophic lateral sclerosis, also known as Lou Gehrig's disease). Doris Buchanan Smith succumbed to cancer in August 2002.

Of her 17 books, only A Taste of Blackberries remains in print. When Publishers Weekly asked children's editors to name a book they wish they had published, Deborah Brodie, former executive editor of Roaring Brook Press, named A Taste of Blackberries, remembering its impact; "Near the end of the book, when Jamie's mother accepts the basket of blackberries his friend has picked, she says, 'I'll bake a pie. And you be sure to come slam the door for me now and then.' The slam of that door reverberates still."
