= Crow Boy =

1956 Caldecott picture book

- Author: Taro Yashima
- Publisher: Viking
- Publication date: 1955, renewed 1983
- Pages: unpaged
- Awards: Caldecott Honor

Crow Boy is a 1955 picture book written and illustrated by Taro Yashima.

== Plot ==
Chibi is a quiet and lonely boy who is often ignored and teased by his classmates. Because he rarely speaks and keeps to himself, the other children fail to recognize his talents. When a new teacher arrives at the school, he takes an interest in Chibi and discovers that the boy has an unusual ability to imitate the calls of birds. The teacher encourages Chibi to share his talent with the class, leading his classmates to see him in a new light and appreciate his unique gifts.

== Themes ==
The book explores themes of belonging, acceptance, individuality, overcoming bullying, and developing personal talents.

== Reception ==
The book was a recipient of a 1956 Caldecott Honor for its illustrations and shared the 1955 Child Study Association (now affiliated with Bank Street College of Education) Children's Book Award (now called the Josette Frank Award) with Plain Girl by Virginia Sorensen. This book was translated into Japanese by Taro himself and published in Japan in 1979. Crow Boy is one of the books featured at The Rabbit hOle, an immersive children's book museum in Kansas City, MO.
