= A Dog on Barkham Street =

1960 book by Mary Stolz

- First edition
- Author: Mary Stolz
- Illustrator: Leonard Shortall
- Language: English
- Genre: Children's literature
- Publication date: 1960
- Publication place: United States
- Media type: Print (Paperback)
- Pages: 184 pp
- Preceded by: Emmett's Pig
- Followed by: Belling the Tiger

A Dog on Barkham Street is a children's novel published in 1960 written by Mary Stolz and illustrated by Leonard Shortall. It was voted one of 41 notable children's books of 1960 in a poll of librarians conducted by the American Library Association.

A companion novel, The Bully of Barkham Street, was published in 1963. This presents the events of A Dog on Barkham Street from the bully's point of view.

== Plot ==
The main character, Edward Frost, is a kid who is constantly bullied by his neighbor, Martin Hastings. Edward asks his parents if they can move to a far away place, to escape his bully, but they deny him. He also asks for a dog, but his parents do not believe he is responsible enough to care for one,because he isn't. One day, Uncle Josh, a wandering hobo, gives the Edward a collie named Argess.
