= Thomas J. Dygard =

American author and journalist (1931–1996)

- Born: August 10, 1931
- Died: October 5, 1996 (aged 65); Evansville, Indiana, United States
- Occupations: Novelist, Journalist
- Writing career
- Genre: Sports

Thomas J. Dygard (August 10, 1931 – October 5, 1996) was an American author and journalist. He wrote several novels for children, relating to sports.

His best-known titles include:

- Second Stringer (Football)
- The Rookie Arrives (Baseball)
- Outside Shooter (Basketball)
- Soccer Duel (Soccer)
- Wilderness Peril (Camping, hiking)
