= Jacqueline Kelly =

American novelist

- Born: New Zealand
- Occupation: Writer
- Writing career
- Subject: writing
- Notable work: The Evolution of Calpurnia Tate
- Notable awards: Newbery Honor
- Website: www.jacquelinekelly.com

Jacqueline Kelly is a New Zealand-born American writer. Her books are popular with both children and adults.

== Personal life ==
Kelly was born in New Zealand and moved with her family to Canada when she was young, then to Texas. She earned degrees in law and medicine and continues to practice medicine in Austin, Texas.

== Writing career ==
Kelly's first published story appeared in the Mississippi Review in 2001.

In 2009 her first novel, The Evolution of Calpurnia Tate, was published. It tells the story of a young girl growing up in Texas in 1899, learning what it means to be a woman in turn-of-the-century America, and learning about science and the natural world from her grandfather. It was a Newbery Honor Book, one runner-up for the annual Newbery Medal. A follow-up, The Curious World of Calpurnia Tate, was published in 2015 to much acclaim.

Kelly has also written a sequel to The Wind in the Willows called Return to the Willows, published in October 2012.

She has also written a series of Calpurnia Tate / Girl Vet chapter books for younger readers.

Kelly is represented by Marcy Posner at Folio Literary Management.

== Adaptations ==
The Evolution of Calpurnia Tate was adapted into a musical play by Omri Schein and Daniel Lincoln. It premiered at the Lamb's Player Theatre in San Diego in 2024, where it received critical acclaim.

== Bibliography ==
=== Calpurnia Tate ===
1. The Evolution of Calpurnia Tate (2009)
2. The Curious World of Calpurnia Tate (2015)

==== Calpurnia Tate, Girl Vet ====
- Skunked!
- Counting Sheep (2017)
- Who Gives a Hoot? (2017)
- A Prickly Problem (2018)
- A Squirrelly Situation (2019)
- Goats for Christmas (2021)

=== Other ===
- Return to the Willows (2012)
