= The Story of the Bad Little Boy =

Short story by Mark Twain

"The Story of the Bad Little Boy" is a short story written by American author Mark Twain, originally published in 1865, in The Californian. The story follows the life of Jim, the titular "bad little boy," who avoids consequences for his immoral behavior. It satirizes moralistic children's tales that were prevalent during the 19th century.

== Plot summary ==
The story follows the life of Jim, a child who thrives despite his numerous wrongdoings. Jim's misdeeds include lying to his mother, stealing from a local farmer, framing a classmate for theft, and punching his sister. The narrative concludes with Jim growing up, becoming wealthy, and living a successful life without facing any retribution for his childhood misdeeds.

Throughout the story, Twain compares Jim's impunity to the typical protagonists of the "Sunday-school books" who face dire consequences for their misdeeds.
