= Jim Trelease =

American educator (1941–2022)

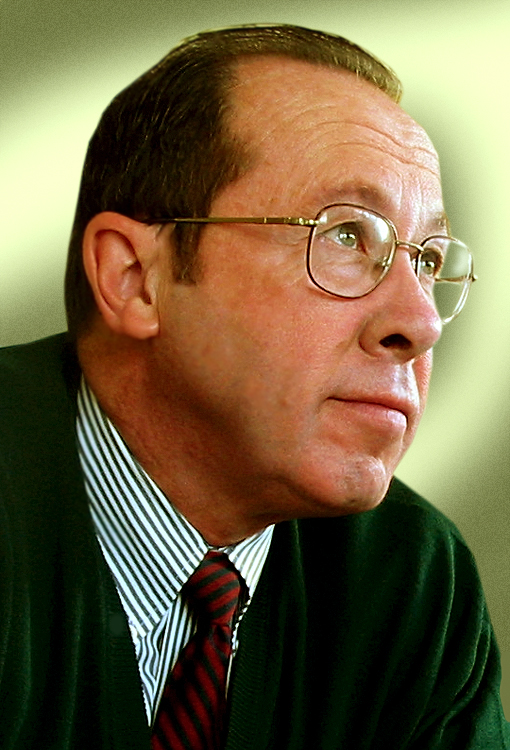

James Joseph Trelease (March 23, 1941 – July 28, 2022) was an American educator and author who stressed reading aloud to children to instill a love of literature.

== Life ==
Jim Trelease was born on March 23 in Orange, New Jersey, to George Edward and Jane (Conlan) Trelease, a Cornish American family. In 1945, his family moved to Union, New Jersey, where he attended St. Michael Parish School. In 1952, his family moved to North Plainfield, New Jersey. Here, he attended Stoney Brook Junior High and North Plainfield High School. Three years later, he moved again to Springfield, Massachusetts, and attended Cathedral High School. He graduated in 1959. From 1959 to 1963, Trelease was enrolled in the University of Massachusetts, where he received a B.A. from the University of Massachusetts Amherst. In 1963, he married Susan Kelleher and had two children: Elizabeth Jane and James Joseph Jr. Trelease. He served in United States Army Intelligence from 1964 to 1966 as a First Lieutenant.

Trelease lectured to school groups and educational gatherings across the nation from 1979 until 2008 (often in conjunction with purveyors of books for young people) about the fundamental importance of youthful reading to the entire process of education.

== Career ==
- 1963–1983—Writer and Staff Artist, Springfield (MA) Daily News
- 1983–2008—Self-employed, owner of the education consultant company Reading Tree Publications
- 2008–2022—Retired from lecture, continued to maintain his website www.trelease-on-reading.com.

== Wilt Chamberlain's 100-point game ==
Trelease helped put an end to a controversy over Wilt Chamberlain's 100-point game. In 1990, a reel-to-reel tape of Bill Campbell's entire fourth quarter call surfaced. He had recorded a 3 a.m. re-broadcast of the fourth quarter of the game. The NBA merged the reel-to-reel with the dictaphone tape, which also included a short postgame show.

== The Read-Aloud Handbook ==
During his time working for the Springfield Daily News, now the Springfield Republican, Trelease began weekly volunteer visits to community classrooms to talk to children about journalism and art as possible careers. Trelease noticed that many of the students in these classrooms did not read much for pleasure, whereas those who did most often came from classrooms where teachers read aloud daily and incorporated Sustained Silent Reading (SSR) into the daily class routine. Trelease began to think that there may be a connection between reading to a child and its desire to read. It turned out that there was in fact a correlation. However, the information and research was published in education journals or written in academic language that exceeded the understanding of the average parent or teacher. So, Trelease was inspired to write and self-publish the first edition of The Read-Aloud Handbook in 1979.

== The read aloud phenomenon ==
The first Penguin edition of The Read-Aloud Handbook led to six additional U.S. editions as well as British, Australian, Spanish, Chinese, Korean, and Japanese versions. Nearly two million copies of the Handbook have been sold worldwide. Moreover, it was the inspiration for PBS's Storytime series. It is also used as a text for future teachers, and is the basis for more than 3,000 elementary and secondary schools adopting sustained silent reading as a regular part of the academic day.

The Handbook was a pivotal force between 1979 and 2008 for read-aloud movements in the United States and abroad. Delaware, Virginia, West Virginia, Nebraska, Hawaii, and one European country (Poland) launched state- and country-wide campaigns based on Trelease's work and seminars. Poland launched its national campaign "All of Poland Reads to Kids" in 2001. By 2007, polls showed that over 85% of Polish people knew of the reading campaign, and 37% of parents of preschoolers reported that they were reading daily to their children.

== Awards, honors, and publications ==
- 1979 – Self-published 32-page booklet "Read-Aloud Handbook for Parents and Teachers", which was subsequently published by Weekly Reader Books, Middletown, CT
- 1980 – First place for feature writing, Associated Press – New England for the feature “Trip to Fenway Drives Home Truth—Right Off the Bat,” Springfield Daily News

Last reprint – Read All About It! (Penguin Books, 1993)

- 1982 – The Read-Aloud Handbook, trade paperback edition (Penguin Books, US)
- 1983 – The Read-Aloud Handbook on New York Times bestseller list for 17 weeks
- 1983 – Read-Aloud Handbook (Penguin-Great Britain edition)
- 1985 – Read-Aloud Handbook (Penguin Australia edition)
- 1985 – Read-Aloud Handbook (Penguin, revised U.S. edition)
- 1988 – Read-Aloud Handbook (Japanese edition)
- 1988 – Jeremiah Ludington Memorial Award for outstanding contribution to reading, presented by Educational Paperback Publishers Association
- 1989 -Designated by International Reading Association as one of eight “Greats of the 80s” reading educators
- 1989 – The New Read-Aloud Handbook (Penguin, revised, third U.S. edition)
- 1992 – Hey! Listen to This (Viking Penguin), anthology, editor
- 1992 – International Reading Association Print Media Award (1st prize) for “Read Me a Story,” article in February 1991 Parents Magazine
- 1993 – Read All About It! (Viking Penguin), anthology, editor
- 1994 – Elms College, Honorary Doctor of Laws
- 1995 – Read-Aloud Handbook (Penguin, revised, fourth U.S. Edition)
- 1995 – The Read-Aloud Handbook audiobook (Penguin-Highbridge), narrated by Jim Trelease, named one of “Year’s Best Audiobooks” by Publishers Weekly
- 2001 – Read-Aloud Handbook (Penguin, revised, fifth U.S. Edition)
- 2002 – Western New England College, Honorary Doctor of Humane Letters
- 2004 – Read-Aloud Handbook (Spanish edition), Bogota, Colombia
- 2005 – “Turning On the Turned-off Reader,” audio recording by Jim Trelease (Reading Tree Productions)
- 2006 – Read-Aloud Handbook (Chinese edition)
- 2007 – Read-Aloud Handbook (Korean edition)
- 2007 – “Jim Trelease on Reading Aloud,” DVD lecture for parents, teachers, Reading Tree Productions
- 2008 – Read-Aloud Handbook (Indonesian edition)
- 2009 – Read-aloud brochures (series on reading-related issues), produced for use by non-profit organizations for free distribution to parents, teachers, and secondary students www.trelease-on-reading.com/brochures.html

== Bibliography ==
- The Read-Aloud Handbook, 1982, The New Read-Aloud Handbook, 1989, The Read-Aloud Handbook, Sixth Edition, 2006.
- Reading Aloud: Motivating Children to Make Books Into Friends, Not Enemies (film), 1983.
- Turning On the Turned Off Reader (audio cassette), 1983.
- (Editor) Hey! Listen to This: Stories to Read Aloud, 1992.
- (Editor) Read all About It!: Great Read-Aloud Stories, Poems, and Newspaper Pieces for Preteens and Teens, 1993.
- Jim Trelease on Reading Aloud, DVD, 2007.
