= List of children's classic books =

This is a list of classic children's books published no later than 2008 that are still available in the English language.

Books specifically for children existed by the 17th century. Before that, books were written mainly for adults, although some later became popular with children. In Europe, Gutenberg's invention of the printing press around 1440 made possible mass production of books, though the first printed books were quite expensive and remained so for a long time. Gradually, however, improvements in printing technology lowered the costs of publishing and made books more affordable to the working classes, who were also likely to buy smaller and cheaper broadsides, chapbooks, pamphlets, tracts, and early newspapers, all of which were widely available before 1800. In the 19th century, improvements in paper production, as well as the invention of cast-iron and steam-powered printing presses enabled book publishing on a very large scale. and made books of all kinds more affordable.

Scholarships on children's literature includes professional organizations, dedicated publications, and university courses.

== Before the 18th century ==
Title	Author	Year published	References and Brief Introduction
Panchatantra	Vishnu Sharma	c. 800 BC	Ancient Indian inter-related collection of animal fables in verse and prose, in a frame story format. Similar stories are found in later works including Aesop's Fables and the Sindbad tales in Arabian Nights.
Aesop's Fables	Aesop	c. 600 BC	
Kathasaritsagara	Somadeva	11th Century AD	Collection of Indian legends, fairy tales and folk tales as retold by a Saivite Brahmin named Somadeva. Generally believed to derive from Gunadhya's Brhat-katha, written in Paisachi dialect from the south of India.
Arabian Nights	Unknown	before 8th century AD	
The Facetious Nights of Straparola	Giovanni Francesco Straparola	1550–1555	Often cited as the first European storybook to contain fairy-tales though not published for children.
Orbis Pictus	John Amos Comenius	1658	Earliest picture book specifically for children.
A Token for Children. Being An Exact Account of the Conversion, Holy and Exemplary Lives, and Joyful Deaths of several Young Children	James Janeway	1672	One of the first books specifically written for children which shaped much eighteenth- and early nineteenth-century writing for children.

== 18th century ==
Title	Author	Year published	References
Tales of Mother Goose	Charles Perrault	1729 (English)	
Little Pretty Pocket-book	John Newbery	1744	
Little Goody Two Shoes	Oliver Goldsmith	1765	
Lessons for Children	Anna Laetitia Barbauld	1778-9	The first series of age-adapted reading primers for children printed with large text and wide margins; in print for over a century.
The History of Sandford and Merton	Thomas Day	1783-9	A bestseller for over a century, it embodied Rousseau's educational ideals.

== 19th century ==
Title	Author	Year published	References
The Swiss Family Robinson	Johann David Wyss	1812-3	
Grimm's Fairy Tales	Jacob and Wilhelm Grimm	1823 (English)	
A Visit From St. Nicholas	Clement Clarke Moore	1823	
Tales of Peter Parley About America	Peter Parley (pseudonym)	1827	
Fairy Tales	Hans Christian Andersen	1846 (English)	
The Children of the New Forest	Frederick Marryat	1847	
Slovenly Peter	Heinrich Hoffmann	1848 (English)	
The Wide, Wide World	Elizabeth Wetherell (pseudonym)	1850	
The King of the Golden River	John Ruskin	1851	
The Coral Island	R. M. Ballantyne	1857	
Tom Brown's Schooldays	Thomas Hughes	1857	
The Water Babies	Charles Kingsley	1863	
A Journey to the Center of the Earth	Jules Verne	1864	
Little Prudy	Rebecca Sophia Clarke	1864	
Alice's Adventures in Wonderland	Lewis Carroll	1865	
Max and Moritz	Wilhelm Busch	1865	
Hans Brinker or the Silver Skates	Mary Mapes Dodge	1865	
Little Women	Louisa May Alcott	1868	
Ragged Dick	Horatio Alger, Jr.	1868	
Mrs. Overtheway's Remembrances	Juliana Horatia Ewing	1869	
Twenty Thousand Leagues Under the Seas	Jules Verne	1870	
At the Back of the North Wind	George MacDonald	1871	
The Brownies and other Tales	Juliana Horatia Ewing	1871	
The Princess and the Goblin	George MacDonald	1871	
Through the Looking-Glass	Lewis Carroll	1871	
Around the World in Eighty Days	Jules Verne	1872	
A Dog of Flanders	Ouida	1872	
What Katy Did	Susan Coolidge	1873	
Black Beauty	Anna Sewell	1877	
Five Little Peppers and How They Grew	Margaret Sidney	1881	
The Prince and the Pauper	Mark Twain	1881	
The Adventures of Pinocchio	Carlo Collodi	1883	
The Merry Adventures of Robin Hood	Howard Pyle	1883	
Nights with Uncle Remus	Joel Chandler Harris	1883	
Heidi	Johanna Spyri	1884 (English)	
King Solomon's Mines	H. Rider Haggard	1885	
Kidnapped	Robert Louis Stevenson	1886	
Little Lord Fauntleroy	Frances Hodgson Burnett	1886	
The Happy Prince and Other Tales	Oscar Wilde	1888	
A Connecticut Yankee in King Arthur's Court	Mark Twain	1889	
The Blue Fairy Book	Andrew Lang	1889	
The Jungle Book	Rudyard Kipling	1894	
Seven Little Australians	Ethel Turner	1894	
Tom Sawyer Abroad	Mark Twain	1894	
The Second Jungle Book	Rudyard Kipling	1895	
Moonfleet	J. Meade Falkner	1898	
The Black Corsair	Emilio Salgari	1898	
The Reluctant Dragon	Kenneth Grahame	1898	
The Story of the Treasure Seekers	E. Nesbit	1899	
The Wonderful Wizard of Oz	L. Frank Baum	1900	
The Tigers of Mompracem	Emilio Salgari	1900	

== 20th century ==
Title	Author	Year published	References
Five Children and It	E. Nesbit	1902	
Just So Stories	Rudyard Kipling	1902	
The Tale of Peter Rabbit	Beatrix Potter	1902	
King Arthur and His Knights	Howard Pyle	1902-3	
The Call of the Wild	Jack London	1903	
Rebecca of Sunnybrook Farm	Kate Douglas Wiggin	1903	
A Little Princess	Frances Hodgson Burnett	1905	
The Railway Children	E. Nesbit	1906	
White Fang	Jack London	1906	
Queen Silver-Bell	Frances Hodgson Burnett	1906	
The Wonderful Adventures of Nils	Selma Lagerlöf	1906	
Anne of Green Gables	Lucy Maud Montgomery	1908	
The Wind in the Willows	Kenneth Grahame	1908	
The Secret Garden	Frances Hodgson Burnett	1909/1911	
Peter and Wendy	J. M. Barrie	1911	Based on the author's play Peter Pan (1904)
Tarzan	Edgar Rice Burroughs	1912	
The Lost World	Sir Arthur Conan Doyle	1912	
Pollyanna	Eleanor H. Porter	1913	
The Magic Pudding	Norman Lindsay	1918	
Raggedy Ann	Johnny Gruelle	1918	
Lad: A Dog	Albert Payson Terhune	1919	
The Story of Doctor Dolittle	Hugh Lofting	1920	
Juan Bobo	Puerto Rican school children	1921	
The Velveteen Rabbit	Margery Williams	1922	
The Voyages of Doctor Dolittle	Hugh Lofting	1922	
The Dark Frigate	Charles Boardman Hawes	1923	
The Boxcar Children	Gertrude Chandler Warner	1924	
When We Were Very Young	A.A. Milne	1924	
Smoky the Cowhorse	Will James	1926	
Winnie-the-Pooh	A. A. Milne	1926	
Now We Are Six	A. A. Milne	1927	
The House at Pooh Corner	A. A. Milne	1928	
Bambi	Felix Salten	1928	
The Trumpeter of Krakow	Eric P. Kelly	1928	
Milly-Molly-Mandy Stories	Joyce Lankester Brisley	1928	
Emil and the Detectives	Erich Kästner	1929	
Swallows and Amazons	Arthur Ransome	1930–1931	
Babar	Jean de Brunhoff	1931	
Little House in the Big Woods	Laura Ingalls Wilder	1932	
Mary Poppins	P. L. Travers	1934	
Ballet Shoes	Noel Streatfeild	1936	
The Story of Ferdinand	Munro Leaf	1936	
The Hobbit	J. R. R. Tolkien	1937	
And to Think That I Saw It on Mulberry Street	Dr. Seuss	1937	
The Sword in the Stone	T. H. White	1938	
Madeline	Ludwig Bemelmans	1939	
My Name Is Aram	William Saroyan	1940	Children's immigrant experience in the US
Curious George	H. A. Rey	1941	
Five on a Treasure Island	Enid Blyton	1942	
Johnny Tremain	Esther Forbes	1943	
The Little Prince	Antoine de Saint-Exupéry	1943	
Pippi Longstocking	Astrid Lindgren	1945	
Stuart Little	E. B. White	1945	
The Little White Horse	Elizabeth Goudge	1946	
Mistress Masham's Repose	T. H. White	1946	
Thomas the Tank Engine	Wilbert Awdry	1946	
Goodnight Moon	Margaret Wise Brown	1947	
I Capture the Castle	Dodie Smith	1948	
Space Cadet	Robert Anson Heinlein	1948	One of the first modern SF novels written expressly for young people
Finn Family Moomintroll	Tove Jansson	1949	
Noddy Goes to Toyland	Enid Blyton	1949	The first of the Noddy books
The Lion, the Witch, and the Wardrobe	C.S. Lewis	1950	
Charlotte's Web	E. B. White	1952	
The Borrowers	Mary Norton	1952	
The Children of Green Knowe	Lucy M. Boston	1954	
Horton Hears a Who!	Dr. Seuss	1954	
Beezus and Ramona	Beverly Cleary	1955	
Tunnel in the Sky	Robert Anson Heinlein	1955	One of the first instances of mainstream SF for young people featuring a black protagonist
Eloise	Kay Thompson	1955	First published in 1955, it was aimed at adults. When re-published in 1969, it was marketed to children.
The Hundred and One Dalmatians	Dodie Smith	1956	
Harry the Dirty Dog	Gene Zion	1956	
The Silver Sword	Ian Serraillier	1956	Known in the US as Escape from Warsaw.
The Cat in the Hat	Dr. Seuss	1957	
Little Bear	Else Holmelund Minarik	1957	
How the Grinch Stole Christmas	Dr. Seuss	1957	
Tom's Midnight Garden	Philippa Pearce	1958	
A Bear Called Paddington	Michael Bond	1958	
The Rescuers	Margery Sharp	1959	
The Weirdstone of Brisingamen	Alan Garner	1960	
James and the Giant Peach	Roald Dahl	1961	
The Phantom Tollbooth	Norton Juster	1961	
The Big Honey Hunt	Stan and Jan Berenstain	1962	
A Wrinkle in Time	Madeleine L'Engle	1962	
The Wolves of Willoughby Chase	Joan Aiken	1962	
Stig of the Dump	Clive King	1963	
Where the Wild Things Are	Maurice Sendak	1963	
Clifford the Big Red Dog	Norman Bridwell	1963	
Amelia Bedelia	Peggy Parish	1963	
Charlie and the Chocolate Factory	Roald Dahl	1964	
Flat Stanley	Jeff Brown	1964	
The Giving Tree	Shel Silverstein	1964	
Harriet the Spy	Louise Fitzhugh	1964	
Chitty-Chitty-Bang-Bang: The Magical Car	Ian Fleming	1964	
The Fox and the Hound	Daniel P. Mannix and John Schoenherr	1967	
The Owl Service	Alan Garner	1967	
A Wizard of Earthsea	Ursula K. Le Guin	1968	With its sequels, it broke ground for epic fantasy in several ways: the first book had a non-white hero, the later books explored the role of gender in fantasy and power, and the quest structure is not good vs. evil but balance.
The Iron Man	Ted Hughes	1968	
The Tiger Who Came to Tea	Judith Kerr	1968	
The Very Hungry Caterpillar	Eric Carle	1969	
Charlotte Sometimes	Penelope Farmer	1969	
Summer of the Swans	Betsy Byars	1971	
Are You There, God? It's Me, Margaret	Judy Blume	1970	Approached puberty more openly than children's books had in the past.
When Hitler Stole Pink Rabbit	Judith Kerr	1971	
Mrs. Frisby and the Rats of NIMH	Robert C. O'Brien	1971	
Tales of a Fourth Grade Nothing	Judy Blume	1972	
Watership Down	Richard Adams	1972	
A Taste of Blackberries	Doris Buchanan Smith	1973	Taboo-breaking children's book concerning a child's first grief experience.
The Worst Witch	Jill Murphy	1974	
Bridge to Terabithia	Katherine Paterson	1977	
Each Peach Pear Plum	Janet and Allan Ahlberg	1978	
The Snowman	Raymond Briggs	1978	
The Neverending Story	Michael Ende	1979	
The Indian in the Cupboard	Lynne Reid Banks	1980	
The Paper Bag Princess	Robert Munsch	1980	
Nothing's Fair in Fifth Grade	Barthe DeClements	1981	
Jumanji	Chris Van Allsburg	1981	Film adaptation released in 1997
Goodnight Mister Tom	Michelle Magorian	1981	
The BFG	Roald Dahl	1982	
Dear Zoo	Rod Campbell	1982	
The Secret Diary of Adrian Mole, Aged 13¾	Sue Townsend	1982	
War Horse	Michael Morpurgo	1982	
The Sheep-Pig	Dick King-Smith	1983	Published as Babe, the Gallant Pig in the US. Filmed as Babe in 1995.
Angelina Ballerina	Katharine Holabird	1983	
Sarah Plain and Tall	Patricia MacLachlan	1985	
The Castle in the Attic	Elizabeth Winthrop	1985	
Kiki's Delivery Service	Eiko Kadono	1985	
Howl's Moving Castle	Diana Wynne Jones	1986	Animated film adaptation by Studio Ghibli
Love You Forever	Robert Munsch	1986	
Franklin	Paulette Bourgeois and Brenda Clark	1986	
The Little Polar Bear	Hans de Beer	1987	
Madame Doubtfire	Anne Fine	1987	Published as Alias Madame Doubtfire in the US. Filmed as Mrs. Doubtfire starring Robin Williams.
We're Back! A Dinosaur's Story	Hudson Talbott	1987	Film adaptation released in 1993
Matilda	Roald Dahl	1988	
We're Going on a Bear Hunt	Michael Rosen	1989	
Shrek!	William Steig	1990	
The True Confessions of Charlotte Doyle	Avi	1990	
Owl Babies	Martin Waddell	1992	
Guess How Much I Love You	Sam McBratney	1994	
The Golden Compass	Philip Pullman	1995	
Tales from Watership Down	Richard Adams	1996	
The Subtle Knife	Philip Pullman	1997	
Harry Potter Series	J.K. Rowling	1997-2007	
Skellig	David Almond	1998	
Holes	Louis Sachar	1998	
The Gruffalo	Julia Donaldson	1999	
The Amber Spyglass	Philip Pullman	2000	

== 21st century ==
Title	Author	Year published	References
Artemis Fowl	Eoin Colfer	2001	
Room on the Broom	Julia Donaldson	2002	
Coraline	Neil Gaiman	2002	
The Gruffalo's Child	Julia Donaldson	2004	
Al Capone Does My Shirts	Gennifer Choldenko	2004	
The Lightning Thief	Rick Riordan	2005	First of the Percy Jackson & the Olympians series
Fancy Nancy	Jane O'Connor	2005	
The True Meaning of Smekday	Adam Rex	2007	
Stick Man	Julia Donaldson	2008	
The Graveyard Book	Neil Gaiman	2008	The first book to win both the Newbery Medal and the Carnegie Medal
The Boy in the Dress	David Walliams	2008	

== See also ==
- List of children's literature authors
- List of fairy tales
- Lists of books
- Lists of fictional characters by work
