= I Can Read! =

Series of books for early readers published by HarperCollins

I Can Read! is a line of beginning reading books published by HarperCollins. The series is rated by level and is widely used to teach children to read English. The first book in the series was Else Holmelund Minarik's Little Bear, published in 1957.

== Structure ==
The I Can Read! series divides its output into 6 levels:

- My Very First - for teaching children vowels
- My First - for reading aloud to children
- Level 1 - for children who have begun to read sounds and sentences aloud
- Level 2 - for children who can read confidently, but still benefit from help
- Level 3 - enjoyable titles for children to read unassisted
- Level 4 - advanced titles to further develop the readers' literacy

== History ==
The I Can Read! series began with 1957's Little Bear, by Else Holmelund Minarik and illustrated by Maurice Sendak. There are now over 500 titles in the series.

HarperCollins published a new series in 2021, called "I Can Read! Comics", which is targeted at children between the ages of four and eight.

== Other languages and formats ==
Some I Can Read! books are also available in Spanish, French, audiobook, and e-book format.

== Recognition ==
I Can Read! books have won Newbery Medal and Caldecott Medal honors.

== Selected titles ==
- Amelia Bedelia series by Peggy and Herman Parish
- At Home in a New Land by Joan Sandin
- Arthur series by Lillian Hoban
- Biscuit by Alyssa Satin Capucilli, illustrated by Pat Schories
- Danny and the Dinosaur, story and pictures by Syd Hoff (1958)
- Frog and Toad series, Arnold Lobel
- Little Bear series, by Else Holmelund Minarik, pictures by Maurice Sendak
- Two Silly Trolls by Nancy Jewell, pictures by Lisa Thiesing
- Silly Times with Two Silly Trolls by Nancy Jewell, pictures by Lisa Thiesing
- The Witch Who Was Afraid of Witches by Alice Low, pictures by Jane Manning
- Indian Summer by F.N. Monjo, pictures by Anita Lobel
- No Fighting, No Biting! by Else Holmelund Minarik, pictures by Maurice Sendak (1958)
- Sammy the Seal, story and pictures by Syd Hoff
- Julius, story and pictures by Syd Hoff (1959)
- Oliver, story and pictures by Syd Hoff (1959)
- Chester, story and pictures by Syd Hoff (1959)
- Stanley, story and pictures by Syd Hoff (1959)
- Little Chief, story and pictures by Syd Hoff (1959)
- Last One Home Is a Green Pig by Edith Thacher Hurd, pictures by Clement Hurd (1959)
- Hurry Hurry by Edith Thacher Hurd, pictures by Clement Hurd (1959)
- Stop Stop by Edith Thacher Hurd, pictures by Clement Hurd (1959)
- No Funny Business by Edith Thacher Hurd, pictures by Clement Hurd (1959)
- Emmett's Pig by Mary Stolz, pictures by Garth Williams
- Harry and the Lady Next Door by Gene Zion, pictures by Margaret Bloy Graham
- The Fire Cat, story and pictures by Esther Averill
- Scarlet Monster Lives Here by Marjorie Weinman Sharmat, illustrated by Dennis Kendrick
- David and the Giant by Mike McClintock, pictures by Fritz Siebel
- Morris Is a Cowboy, a Policeman and a Baby Sitter, story and pictures by B. Wiseman
- A Picture for Harold's Room by Crockett Johnson
- Morris the Moose by B. Wiseman
- Tell Me Some More by Crosby Bonsall, pictures by Fritz Siebel
- Morris and Boris Join the Circus by B. Wiseman
- Morris Goes to School by B. Wiseman
- Piggle by Crosby Bonsall
- Who's a Pest? by Crosby Bonsall
- And I Mean It, Stanley by Crosby Bonsall
- The Day I Had to Play with My Sister, story and pictures by Crosby Bonsall
- Who's Afraid of the Dark?, story and pictures by Crosby Bonsall
- The Happy Birthday Present by Joan Heilbroner, pictures by Mary Chalmers
- This Is the House Where Jack Lives by Joan Heilbroner, pictures by Aliki
- Little Runner of the Longhouse by Betty Baker, pictures by Arnold Lobel
- What Do They Do? Policemen and Firemen by Carla Greene, pictures by Leonard Kessler
- Tillie and Mert by Ida Luttrell, pictures by Doug Cushman
- What Spot? by Crosby Bonsall
- The Secret Three by Mildred Myrick, pictures by Arnold Lobel
- A Bargain for Frances by Russell Hoban, pictures by Lillian Hoban
- Doctors and Nurses: What Do They Do? by Carla Greene, pictures by Leonard Kessler
- The Elephant Who Couldn't Forget by Faith McNulty, pictures by Marc Simont
- Grizzwold, story and pictures by Syd Hoff
- Barney's Horse, story and pictures by Syd Hoff
- Mrs. Brice's Mice, story and pictures by Syd Hoff
- Captain Cat, story and pictures by Syd Hoff
- The Lighthouse Children, story and pictures by Syd Hoff
- Soldiers and Sailors: What Do They Do? by Carla Greene, pictures by Leonard Kessler
- Buzby to the Rescue by Julia Hoban, pictures by John Himmelman
- Buzby by Julia Hoban, pictures by John Himmelman
- Lucille, story and pictures by Arnold Lobel
- Small Pig, story and pictures by Arnold Lobel
- Owl at Home by Arnold Lobel
- Mouse Tales by Arnold Lobel
- Grasshopper on the Road by Arnold Lobel
- Mouse Soup by Arnold Lobel
- Uncle Elephant by Arnold Lobel
- Red Fox and His Canoe by Nathaniel Benchley, pictures by Arnold Lobel
- Railroad Engineers and Airplane Pilots: What Do They Do? by Carla Greene, pictures by Leonard Kessler
- Tom and the Two Handles by Russell Hoban, pictures by Lillian Hoban
- Three to Get Ready by Betty Boegehold, pictures by Mary Chalmers
- The Drinking Gourd by F.N. Monjo, pictures by Fred Brenner
- Stan the Hot Dog Man by Ethel and Leonard Kessler
- Johnny Lion's Book by Edith Thacher Hurd, pictures by Clement Hurd
- No More Monsters for Me! by Peggy Parish, pictures by Marc Simont
- Dinosaur Time! by Peggy Parish, pictures by Arnold Lobel
- Little Chick's Big Day by Mary DeBall Kwitz, pictures by Bruce Degen
- Little Chick's Friend Duckling by Mary DeBall Kwitz, pictures by Bruce Degen
- Little Chick's Big Breakfast by Mary DeBall Kwitz, pictures by Bruce Degen
- Hill of Fire by Thomas P. Lewis, pictures by Joan Sandin
- Porcupine's Pajama Party by Terry Webb Harshman, pictures by Doug Cushman
- The Adventures of Snail at School, story and pictures by John Stadler
- Too Many Babas, story and pictures by Carolyn Croll
- Oscar Otter by Nathaniel Benchley, illustrations by Arnold Lobel
- Sam the Minuteman by Nathaniel Benchley, pictures by Arnold Lobel
- Wagon Wheels by Barbara Brenner, pictures by Don Bolognese
- Juan Bobo series by Virginia Schomp, pictures by Jess Yeomans
- The Big Balloon Race by Eleanor Coerr, pictures by Carolyn Croll
- The Long Way to a New Land by Joan Sandin

=== Mystery books ===
- The Case of the Hungry Stranger, story and pictures by Crosby Bonsall
- The Case of the Cat's Meow by Crosby Bonsall
- The Case of the Double Cross by Crosby Bonsall
- The Case of the Scaredy Cats by Crosby Bonsall
- The Case of the Dumb Bells by Crosby Bonsall
- Big Max by Kin Platt, pictures by Robert Lopshire
- The Case of the Two Masked Robbers by Lillian Hoban
- Aunt Eater Loves a Mystery by Doug Cushman
- Aunt Eater's Mystery Vacation by Doug Cushman
- Aunt Eater's Mystery Halloween by Doug Cushman
- Aunt Eater's Mystery Christmas by Doug Cushman
- Inspector Hopper by Doug Cushman
- Inspector Hopper's Mystery Year by Doug Cushman
- The Great Snake Escape by Molly Coxe
- The Rooftop Mystery by Joan M. Lexau, pictures by Syd Hoff

=== Sports books ===
- Here Comes the Strikeout by Leonard Kessler
- Kick, Pass, and Run, story and pictures by Leonard Kessler
- Last One In Is a Rotten Egg by Leonard Kessler

=== Early books ===
- Cat and Dog by Else Holmelund Minarik, pictures by Fritz Siebel
- Who Will Be My Friends?, story and pictures by Syd Hoff
- Albert the Albatross, story and pictures by Syd Hoff
- The Horse in Harry's Room, story and pictures by Syd Hoff
- Thunderhoof, story and pictures by Syd Hoff
- What Have I Got? by Mike McClintock, pictures by Leonard Kessler
- Come and Have Fun by Edith Thacher Hurd, pictures by Clement Hurd
- Mine's the Best by Crosby Bonsall
- Hester the Jester by Ben Schecter

=== Science I CAN READ books ===
- Seeds and More Seeds by Millicent Selsam, pictures by Tomi Ungerer
- Plenty of Fish by Millicent Selsam, pictures by Erik Blegvad
- Tony's Birds by Millicent Selsam, pictures by Kurt Werth
- Terry and the Caterpillars by Millicent Selsam, pictures by Arnold Lobel
- Red Tag Comes Back by Fred Phleger, pictures by Arnold Lobel
- Prove It! by Rose Wyler and Gerald Ames, pictures by Talivaldis Stubis
- Greg's Microscope by Millicent Selsam, pictures by Arnold Lobel
- Seahorse by Robert A. Morris, pictures by Arnold Lobel
- Let's Get Turtles by Millicent Selsam, pictures by Arnold Lobel
- Benny's Animals and How He Put Them In Order, by Millicent Selsam, pictures by Arnold Lobel
- When an Animal Grows, by Millicent Selsam
- Hidden Animals, by Millicent Selsam
- The Toad Hunt, by Janet Chenery
- Ants Are Fun, by Mildred Myrick, pictures by Arnold Lobel
- Wolfie, by Janet Chenery
- Catch a Whale by the Tail, by Edward Ricciuti
- The Penguins Are Coming, by R.L. Penney
- A Nest of Wood Ducks, by Evelyn Shaw, pictures by Cherryl Pape
- The Bug That Laid the Golden Eggs, Millicent Selsam
- Alligator by Evelyn S. Shaw
- Octopus by Evelyn S. Shaw
- Woodchuck by Faith McNulty
- Elephant Seal Island by Evelyn S. Shaw
- More Potatoes! by Millicent Selsam
- Fireflies by Joanne Ryder
- Barn Owl by Phyllis Flower
- Egg to Chick by Millicent Selsam
- An Animal for Alan by Edward R. Ricciuti, pictures by Tom Eaton
- Donald and the Fish That Walked by Edward R. Ricciuti
- Fish Out of School by Evelyn S. Shaw
- Look for a Bird by Edith Thacher Hurd
