= Three to Get Ready =

Three to Get Ready may refer to:

- Three to Get Ready, a documentary film about Duran Duran
- Three to Get Ready, sometimes billed as 3 to Get Ready, TV series featuring Ernie Kovacs
- "Three to Get Ready", a jazz instrumental by Dave Brubeck from the 1959 album Time Out
- "Three to Get Ready", an I Can Read! children's book by Betty Boegehold, with pictures by Mary Chalmers
