= Spooky Stories for a Dark and Stormy Night =

Book by Alice Low

- First edition cover
- Author: Alice Low
- Illustrator: Gahan Wilson
- Cover artist: Gahan Wilson
- Language: English
- Genre: Horror, Children's
- Publisher: Hyperion Books for Children
- Publication date: 1994
- Publication place: United States
- Media type: Print (hardcover)
- Pages: 128
- ISBN: 0-7868-0012-7
- OCLC: 29477251

Spooky Stories for a Dark and Stormy Night is a children's horror anthology compiled by Alice Low and illustrated by Gahan Wilson. It was published in 1994, and contains nineteen stories by various authors. A majority of the collection is based on retelling folktales from around the world, but some are completely original, such as "Duffy's Jacket" and "Good-bye, Miss Patterson."

== Table of Contents ==
The book opens up with an introduction by Alice Low, followed by five chapters. If the titles of each chapter are read one after another, they form their own brief story: "On a Windy, Stormy Night... Down a Dark, Deserted Road... Stands a Strange and Creepy House... With Creaks and Howls and... Gotcha!" At the end of the book, there is an acknowledgments listing.

=== On a Windy, Stormy Night... ===
Title	Written by
Taily-po	Retold by Stephanie Calmenson
Captain Murderer	Charles Dickens retold by George Harland
Wait Till Martin Comes	Retold by Maria Leach

=== Down a Dark, Deserted Road... ===
Title	Written by
The Legend of Sleepy Hollow	Washington Irving retold by Della Rowland
The Devil's Trick	Retold by Isaac Bashevis Singer
Little Buttercup	Retold by Margaret Read MacDonald
Wiley and the Hairy Man	Retold by Della Rowland

=== Stands a Strange and Creepy House ===
Title	Written by
My Neighbor is a Monster, Pass it On	Eric Weiner
Bedtime Snacks	Laurence Yep
The Black Geese	Retold by Alison Lurie
Uninvited Ghosts	Penelope Lively

=== With Creaks and Howls and... ===
Title	Written by
Duffy's Jacket	Bruce Coville
Good-bye, Miss Patterson	Phyllis MacLennan
The Witch Who Was Afraid of Witches	Alice Low
Rap! Rap! Rap!	Retold by Jeanne B. Hardendorff

=== Gotcha! ===
Title	Written by
I'm Coming Up the Stairs	Retold by Wendy Wax
The Strange Visitor	Retold by Wendy Wax
The Golden Arm	Retold by Wendy Wax
Boo!	Kevin Crossley-Holland
