= Alice Low (disambiguation) =

Alice Low may refer to:

- Alice Low (suffragist) (1877–1954), British suffragist
- Alice Low (1926–2012), American author, lyricist, and editor

== See also ==
- Alice Lowe (born 1977), English actress, writer, and comedian
