= Amelia Bedelia (book) =

Children's picture book

- Cover of the first edition, designed by Fritz Siebel
- Author: Peggy Parish
- Illustrator: Fritz Siebel
- Cover artist: Fritz Siebel
- Language: English
- Series: Amelia Bedelia
- Subject: Idioms, literal language
- Genre: Children's picture book, comedy
- Publisher: Harper & Row
- Publication date: 1963
- Publication place: United States
- Media type: Print (hardcover)
- Pages: 32 unnumbered
- OCLC: 301683
- LC Class: PZ7.P219 Am
- Followed by: Thank You, Amelia Bedelia

Amelia Bedelia is the first book in the Amelia Bedelia children's picture book series about a housekeeper who takes her instructions literally. It was written by Peggy Parish, illustrated by Fritz Siebel, and published by Harper and Row in 1963. The idea for the book came from a former housekeeper as well as Peggy's third-grade students at the Dalton School in Manhattan who tended to confuse vocabulary, often with comic results. Over 35 million copies of books in the series have been sold. 2013 marked the book's 50th anniversary and commemorated its popularity with the publication of a new line of Amelia Bedelia books.

== Background ==
There are a few ideas about the inspiration for Amelia Bedelia. In an interview, Peggy Parish's nephew, Herman Parish, mentioned that the inspiration for Amelia Bedelia was Peggy herself, as she often took things literally. Peggy also drew inspiration from the third graders she taught, observing how her students sometimes struggled to interpret instructions that could be misunderstood when taken at face value.

Regarding why Peggy Parish chose to make Amelia Bedelia a housekeeper, Herman shared a story he learned from one of her cousins. Peggy often visited her grandparents, Mr. and Mrs. Rogers, in Manning, South Carolina, where she played with her cousins and enjoyed Sunday dinners. The Rogers household included both a cook and a housekeeper, as well as a younger housekeeper whose primary job was to look after the children because she was not skilled at housework. Peggy's cousin recalled an incident when this young housekeeper had to fill in for the older one. When Mrs. Rogers instructed her to "sweep around the room", she took the instruction literally, sweeping only the edges and leaving the center untouched.

In a 2013 interview, Herman Parish recalls how his aunt created Amelia Bedelia's character because of the need to target children of a certain age when they are both interested in reading and able to use their imagination without restraint. Herman Parish references this same idea in another interview about Amelia Bedelia, noting the importance of incorporating imagination and fun into books to engage children readers.

== Summary ==
Amelia Bedelia is hired as a maid for the wealthy Mr. and Mrs. Rogers. Mrs. Rogers gives Amelia Bedelia a list of chores to complete while the couple go out for the day. Despite meaning well, she cannot seem to do anything right because she misinterprets the Rogers' instructions – many of which are idioms. Amelia Bedelia proceeds to take all the instructions literally.

The items from Amelia Bedelia's list of chores are below with her interpretations of each one:

Instruction	Action taken
Change the towels in the green bathroom	Uses scissors to cut and change the towels' appearance
Dust the furniture	Throws dusting powder onto the furniture (in her house "they un-dust the furniture")
Draw the drapes when the sun comes in	Sketches the drapes on a piece of paper
Put the lights out when you finish in the living room	Takes all the light bulbs out of their sockets and hangs them on a clothes line
Measure two cups of rice	Pours rice into two coffee cups, stacks them, and measures them with a tape measure. She then dumps the rice back into the box.
Trim the fat before you put the steak in the icebox	Decorates the steak by trimming it with lace and ribbons.
Dress the chicken	Fits the chicken into tiny clothes.

When the couple returns home, Mrs. Rogers is infuriated that the chores have not been done in the way they were instructed and Amelia Bedelia has wreaked havoc throughout their house. Mrs. Rogers is on the verge of firing Amelia Bedelia when Mr. Rogers puts a bite of Amelia Bedelia's lemon meringue pie into his wife's mouth. Mrs. Rogers finds it so delicious that she forgives Amelia Bedelia and decides to continue to employ her and vows to write more explicit instructions in the future.

== Analysis ==
=== Language ===
Teaching guides incorporate Amelia Bedelia books into lessons on language – especially idioms – and reading comprehension. In Carol Wolchok's book The Reading Teacher, she outlines a lesson that teaches idioms to third graders with examples from Amelia Bedelia. School Media Activities Monthly published a lesson combining illustrations with instruction on figurative and literal language based on Amelia Bedelia. Examples of idiomatic language from Amelia Bedelia were also used in a study examining metalinguistic ability and whether or not it affects a child's ability to determine meanings of words and/or phrases.

=== Feminist interpretations ===
In an article in The New Yorker, Sarah Blackwood offers a feminist interpretation, arguing that Amelia Bedelia's absurd interpretations are a sort of rebellion that reflect the 1960s feminist movement. A 2021 study found that children's books can influence the ways in which children interpret gender stereotypes. A total of 247 books were read by adults and then given a rating on a scale of 5 in regards to its gender bias – Amelia Bedelia was found to be one of the books with the highest feminine-bias due to its portrayal of gender.

== Publication ==
Over 35 million copies of books in the Amelia Bedelia series have been sold. HarperCollins adapted this and several other books in the series for its I Can Read! line of beginning books. A 50th anniversary edition was published in 2013 which includes author's notes and archive photos. The first two chapter books in the new series written by Peggy's nephew, Herman Parish, were published to coincide with the original book's anniversary, focusing on the young Amelia Bedelia.

== Reception ==
An ABC News article commemorating the 50th anniversary of Amelia Bedelia's publication referred to Amelia as "possibly the most successful housemaid in the world". The recent line of Amelia Bedelia books were published on its 50th anniversary after requests from children readers and even other authors. HarperCollins credits Amelia Bedelia's popularity to the lead character's comic ways and the fact that readers of all ages have read Amelia Bedelia and continue reading it to this day.
