= Biscuit series =

Children's book series by Alyssa Satin Capucilli

- Author: Alyssa Satin Capucilli
- Country: United States
- Language: English
- Genre: Children's fiction
- Publisher: HarperCollins
- Published: 1996–2022
- Media type: Print (paperback)
- No. of books: 70

Biscuit is a series of young children's books by American author Alyssa Satin Capucilli and illustrated by Pat Schories. The series features the everyday adventures of a golden retriever puppy named Biscuit. The series has sold over 21 million copies globally as of 2016. The series is published by HarperCollins and is part of the My First tier of the I Can Read! collection, which are among the first read by young readers.

The eponymous Biscuit is a fictional small, yellow puppy who loves to play and go on adventures. The Biscuit series features events like Biscuit going to school, to the farm, or on a picnic. The books are known for their simple language, repetitive phrases, and charming illustrations aimed at emergent readers and young children.

The series has been published from 1996 to 2022. The series has been praised for engaging young readers and promoting literacy skills. Awards include the Washington Irving Award, Garden State Award, Bank Street College Best Book Award, and the Oppenheim Portfolio Gold Award. The New York Public Library has stated that the Biscuit series are among the most borrowed books.

== Books ==
1. Biscuit (1996)
2. Biscuit Finds a Friend (1997)
3. Bathtime for Buscuit (1998)
4. Biscuit's Picnic (1998)
5. Biscuit's Thanksgiving (1999)
6. Biscuit's New Trick (2000)
7. Biscuit's Valentine's Day (2001)
8. Biscuit Goes to School (2002)
9. Biscuit Goes to the Park (2002)
10. Biscuit Wins a Prize (2003)
11. Biscuit's Big Surprise (2003)
12. Biscuit's Snowy Day (2005)
13. Biscuit's Birthday (2005)
14. Biscuit and the Baby (2005)
15. Biscuit Visits the Big City (2006)
16. Biscuit's Day at the Farm (2007)
17. Biscuit's Christmas Eve (2007)
18. Biscuit and the Little Pup (2007)
19. Biscuit and the Puppy (2007)
20. Biscuit's Day with the Teachers (2007)
21. Biscuit's First Sleepover (2008)
22. Biscuit's School Day Fair (2008)
23. Biscuit Takes a Walk (2009)
24. Biscuit Meets the Class Pet (2009)
25. Biscuit's Petting Farm (2009)
26. Biscuit Goes to the Museum (2010)
27. Biscuit's First Beach Day (2010)
28. Biscuit and the Lost Teddy Bear (2011)
29. Biscuit Loves the Library (2014)
30. Biscuit and the Great Race (2019)
31. Biscuit Loves Fall (2022)
32. Biscuit and Friends: A Day at the Aquarium. ISBN 978-0-0629-1006-6.
