= A Token for Children =

1671 story collection about children

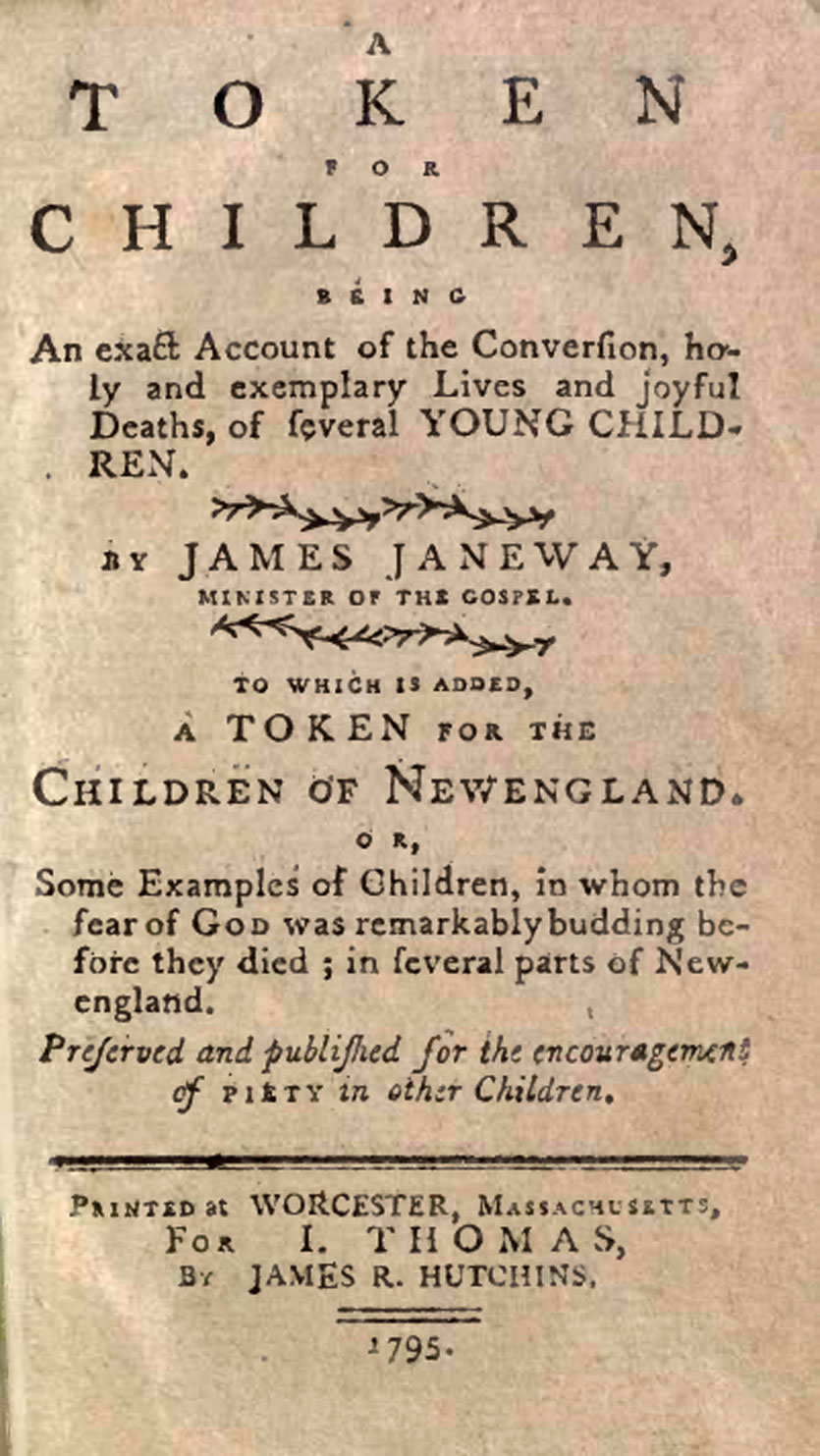
1795 copy of A Token for Children

A Token for Children, or A Token for Children: Being an Exact Account of the Conversion, Holy and Exemplary Lives, and Joyful Deaths of Several Young Children, is a short story collection detailing the conversions, lives, and deaths of various children. It was written by the Puritan minister and author James Janeway. Originally published in 1671, it is considered a classic in children's literature and one of the earliest known examples of an English book written directly for children.

== Contents ==
The book is separated into two volumes and one addendum, containing a total of 20 "examples". The addendum, titled A Token for the Children of New England, contains only examples that specifically involve New England and features an additional 6 scriptural hymns. Each example is a short story involving one child, their worship, and eventual death. Each scriptural hymn is a short poem elaborating on a certain verse of the Bible. Despite the stories likely being fictional, they are often written as if Janeway was present during them or had been told them by someone who was.

The first volume is preceded by an introduction directed towards educators and a preface directed towards children. The introduction discusses the Puritan belief that children are born wicked due to natural sin, warning parents and educators of a child's ability to go to hell if they do not repent at an early enough age. The preface conveys a similar message to children, warning them of how their "miserable state by Nature" can lead them to go to eternal damnation. It reminds children that because they can perish at any moment, they must be dutiful to their parents and live a pious life to avoid suffering a death without Christ. It further provides 11 spiritual questions for children to consider and 12 rules to live by to avoid "everlasting fire".

The second volume contains a preface to the reader, where he acknowledges that one of his stories in volume one was being accused of being false. He defends his source for the example, a woman who is highly respected by the Church of Christ.

=== Volume I ===
Volume I
Story Name	Basic Premise
EXAMPLE I. Of one eminently Converted between Eight and Nine years Old, with an account of her Life and Death.	Sarah's friends take her to her first sermon, where she has a Christian awakening. Soon, she becomes obsessed with reading her Bible and decides to become the ideal Puritan child. She was obedient to her parents, never idle, humble, and diligent. One day a "vein broke in her lungs", leading her bound to her death bed. She repented her sins and prayed intensely, eventually dying after begging Jesus for help.
EXAMPLE II. Of a Child that was admirably affected with the things of God, when he was between Two and Three years Old; with a brief account of his Life and Death.	A young toddler born into a Christian family showed an incredible passion for his faith, often choosing to pray instead of playing with other kids. One day, while discussing the nature of bodily resurrection, he was struck with a terrible illness. He accepted his death on the premise that he would be reunited with Christ and died peacefully when he was five or six years old.
EXAMPLE III. Of a little Girl that was wrought upon, when she was between Four and Five years Old, with some account of her holy Life and triumphant Death.	A young girl, incredibly faithful to Christ, consoles her mother after the death of her husband. She tells her mother that she has no reason to cry, for God is still good to her. The girl is an incredibly devout worshipper, engaging heavily with her Bible and ministers. She always tried to help others repent from their original sin, spread the word of Christ, and dutifully kept the Sabbath. One day she came down with a sickness and accepted her death as a way to return to the Lord. She died when she was 12 years old.
EXAMPLE IV. Of a Child that began to look towards Heaven, when she was about Four years old, with some observable Passages in her Life, and at her Death.	A young girl displayed an incredible sense of duty towards her parents, greatly honoring her mother and father. She counseled other children on spiritual matters, read her Bible frequently, and was exemplary at school. One day she came down with a terrible illness, yet was willing to die if God would forgive her sins. The details of her death were lost among the family's hurry and grief.
EXAMPLE V. Of the Pious Life, and Joyful Death, of a Child which Dyed when he was about Twelve years Old, 1632	Charles Bridgman began praying as soon as he learned to speak. He prayed every night and was grateful for God in everything that he did. Experiencing a lingering disease, he was very concerned about the nature of his soul, heaven, and asked many meaningful questions about both. His pains increasing, he prophesized that he would die on the upcoming Sunday. When Sunday finally came, he said one final prayer and died peacefully
EXAMPLE VI. Of a poor Child that was awakened when he was about Five years Old.	A young boy born to a bad father finds purpose in Catechism, learning its assemblies by heart. He wept for his original sin and was constantly thinking about matters of the soul. When his mother eventually dies, he takes solace in studying the Bible's promises towards fatherless and motherless children. He dies in faith of Christ an unspecified number of years later.
EXAMPLE VII. Of a Notorious Wicked Child, who was taken up from Begging, and admirably Converted; with an account of his holy Life and joyful Death, when he was Nine years Old.	One day, a very poor and wicked boy came knocking at the door of one of Janeway's Christian friends. Feeling pity for his miserable state, the friend took the boy into his parish and began raising him for Christ. In just a couple weeks the boy found true faith, undergoing a complete change and abandoning his sinful ways. He would constantly condemn himself for his sins and wonder why Christ would die for such a terrible person as himself. The Wednesday before dying, the child enters a half-hour trance where see sees visions of angels prophesizing his death on Friday. On Friday he dies as prophesized, expecting the same angels from before to come take him.
