= Alyssa Satin Capucilli =

American author (born 1957)

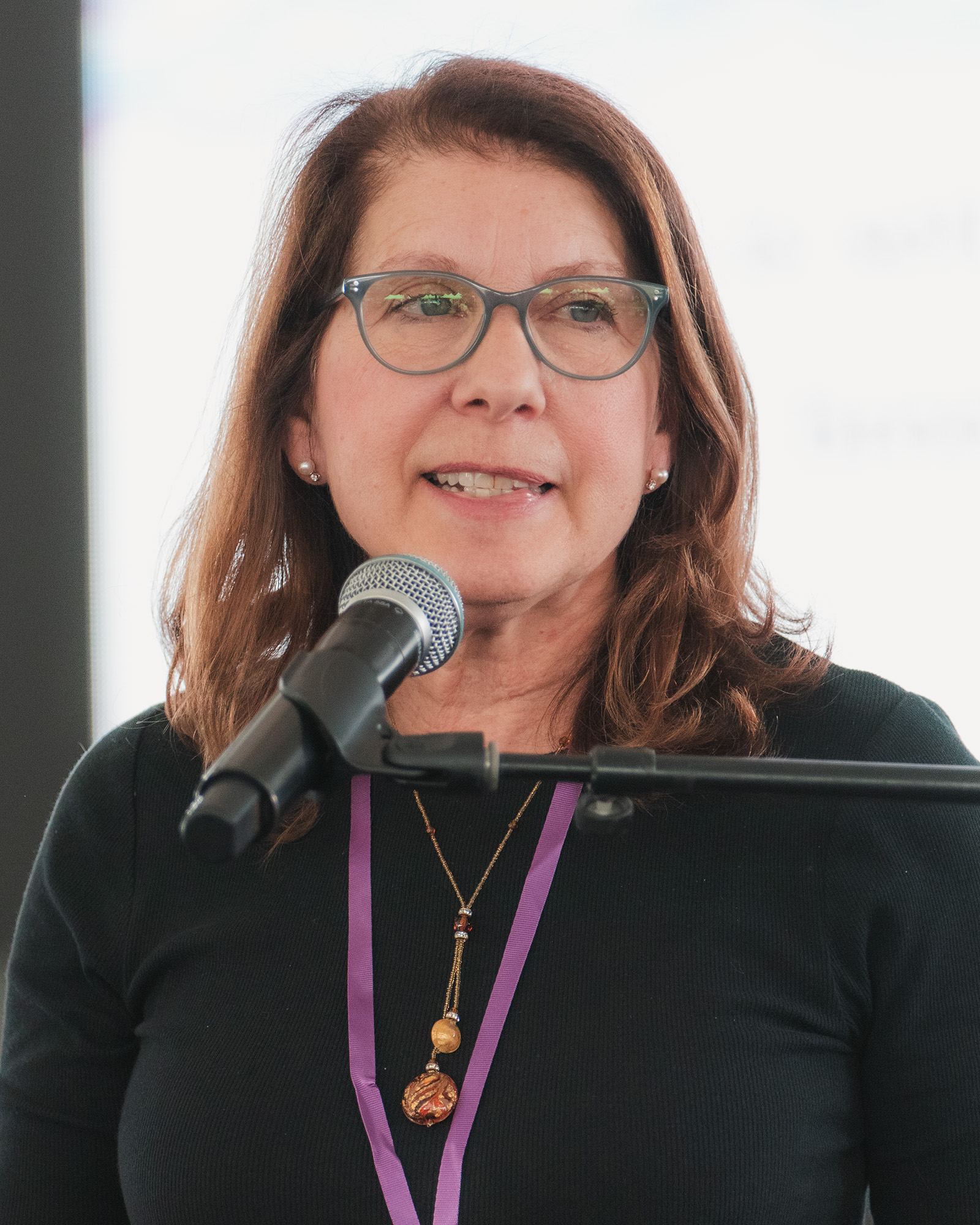
- Capucilli in 2026
- Born: November 2, 1957 (age 68); Brooklyn, New York, U.S.
- Education: Sarah Lawrence College
- Occupation: Author
- Writing career
- Genre: Children's fiction
- Notable work: Biscuit series
- Website: alyssacapucilli.com

Alyssa Satin Capucilli (born November 2, 1957) is an American author of children's fiction. She is best known as the author of the Biscuit series, which began with the book Biscuit in 1996. The Biscuit series has sold over 21 million copies globally as of 2016, making it one of the most successful and popular children's book series of all time. The books in the Biscuit series are part of the I Can Read! series published by HarperCollins and are often among the first books children learn to read.

== Early life and education ==
Born in New York, Alyssa Satin Capucilli initially pursued a career in dance. She was a professional dancer and choreographer for several years before transitioning to writing. Her artistic background is often cited as influencing her writing style, which emphasizes rhythm and movement within the narrative structure. She earned a Bachelor of Arts degree from Sarah Lawrence College.

== Literary career ==
Capucilli's career in children's literature began in the early 1990s. Her breakthrough came with the introduction of the character Biscuit, a playful yellow puppy, in the book Biscuit (1996). The Biscuit series quickly gained popularity due to its simple text, repetitive phrases, and engaging illustrations by Pat Schories.

The Biscuit series has expanded significantly over the years, encompassing a wide range of themes and situations relevant to young children's lives, such as going to school, visiting the doctor, celebrating holidays, and exploring nature. The series has sold millions of copies worldwide and has been translated into numerous languages, solidifying its status as a cornerstone of early childhood literature.

In 2024, she co-wrote the picture book Willow the White House Cat with Jill Biden.

== Awards and honors ==
She has received many notable awards for her books including the Washington Irving Award, Garden State Award, Bank Street College Best Book Award, and the Oppenheim Portfolio Gold Award.

== Books ==
- Good Morning, Pond. Hyperion Books for Children. 1994. ISBN 978-1-56282-675-8.
- Little Spotted Cat. Dial. April 2005. ISBN 0-8037-2692-9.
- Katy Duck. Simon and Schuster. July 10, 2007. ISBN 978-1-4169-1901-8.
- Starring Katy Duck. 2008. ISBN 978-1-4424-1975-9.
- Scat, Cat!. HarperCollins. 2011. ISBN 978-0-06-117754-5.
- My First Karate Class. Little Simon. April 3, 2012. ISBN 978-1-4424-2748-8.
- I Will Love You. Scholastic Inc. March 28, 2017. ISBN 978-0-545-81993-0.
- Bone Soup: A Spooky, Tasty Tale. Simon and Schuster. July 24, 2018. ISBN 978-1-4814-8609-5.
- And a Cat From Carmel Market. Kar-Ben Publishing. 2021. ISBN 978-1-5415-8670-3.
- Willow the White House Cat (2024); co-written with Jill Biden

=== Biscuit series ===
- Biscuit (1996)
- Biscuit Finds a Friend (1997)
- Biscuit's Picnic (1998)
- Biscuit's Thanksgiving (1999)
- Biscuit's New Trick (2000)
- Biscuit's Valentine's Day (2001)
- Biscuit Goes to School (2002)
- Biscuit Goes to the Park (2002)
- Biscuit Wins a Prize (2003)
- Biscuit's Big Surprise (2003)
- Biscuit's Snowy Day (2005)
- Biscuit's Birthday (2005)
- Biscuit and the Baby (2005)
- Biscuit Visits the Big City (2006)
- Biscuit's Day at the Farm (2007)
- Biscuit's Christmas Eve (2007)
- Biscuit and the Little Pup (2007)
- Biscuit and the Puppy (2007)
- Biscuit's Day with the Teachers (2007)
- Biscuit's First Sleepover (2008)
- Biscuit's School Day Fair (2008)
- Biscuit Takes a Walk (2009)
- Biscuit Meets the Class Pet (2009)
- Biscuit's Petting Farm (2009)
- Biscuit Goes to the Museum (2010)
- Biscuit's First Beach Day (2010)
- Biscuit and the Lost Teddy Bear (2011)
- Biscuit Loves the Library (2014)
- Biscuit and the Great Race (2019)
- Biscuit and the Great Fall Day (2022)
- Biscuit and Friends Visit the Community Garden (2022)
- Biscuit Feeds the Pets (2023)
- Biscuit and Friends: A Day at the Aquarium. ISBN 978-0-0629-1006-6.
- Biscuit Visits the Firehouse (2024)
- Biscuit's Puppy Sleepover (2025)
