= Herman Parish =

American writer

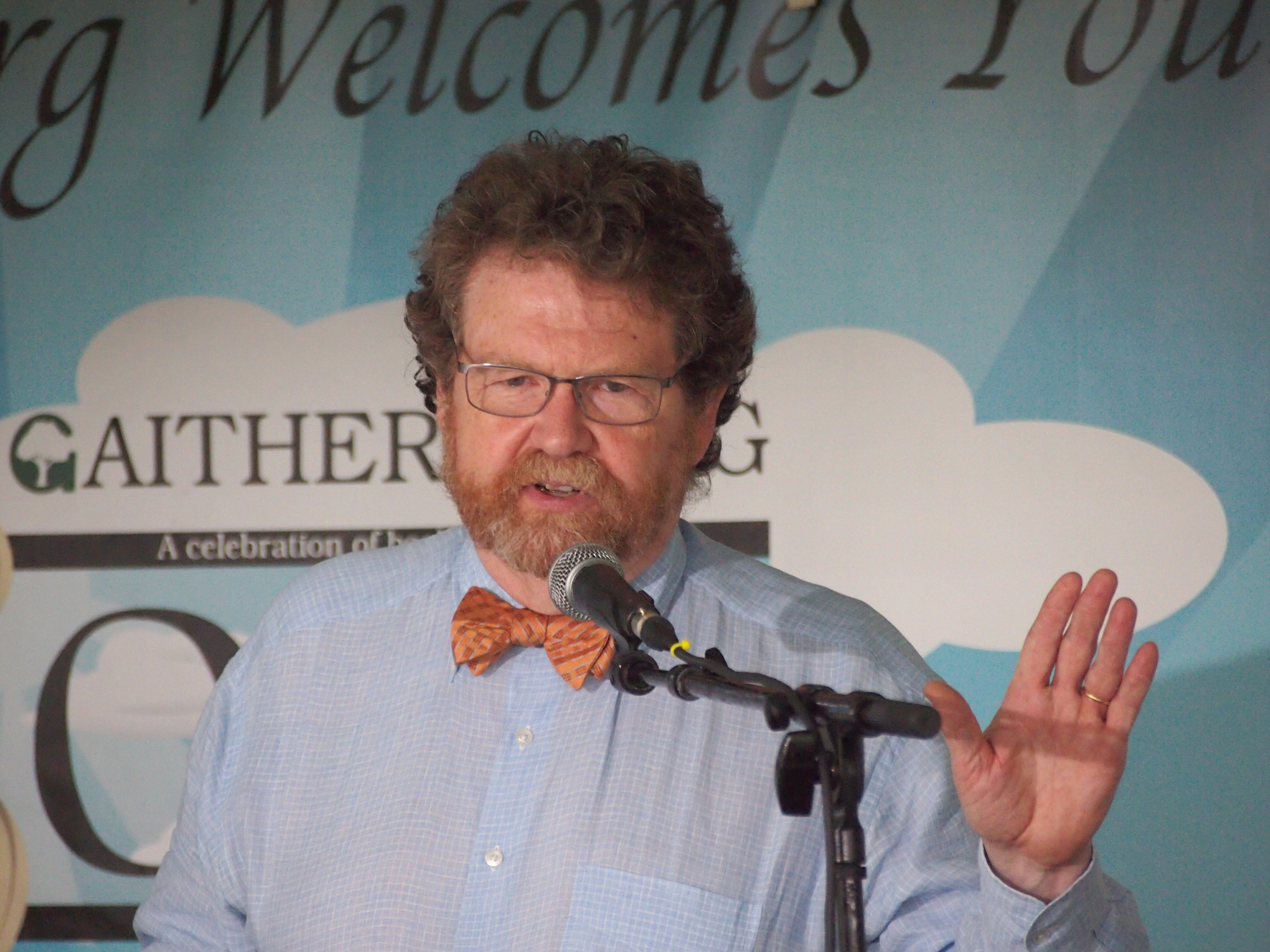
- Parish in 2017
- Born: 1953; Waco, Texas, U. S.
- Died: February 10, 2024 (aged 70–71)
- Occupation: Novelist
- Writing career
- Language: English
- Notable work: Amelia Bedelia

Herman S. Parish III (1953–February 10, 2024) was an American author, best known for his work on the Amelia Bedelia book series, which was created by his aunt Peggy Parish. Following his aunt's death in 1988, Parish continued the series from 1995 to 2022.

== Life and career ==
Parish was born in Waco, Texas. He graduated from the Wharton School of the University of Pennsylvania and spent four years in the U.S. Navy. Following a 13-year career as an advertising copywriter, Parish took over the writing of his late aunt's series of children's books, Amelia Bedelia, in 1995.

Parish had three children. His son Stan, who later became a writer, was in elementary school when his father continued the series.

In an interview with Publishers Weekly, Parish said he didn't want to copy his aunt's style of "Amelia being given a list of things to do, but then being left alone to interpret it literally and run amuck," but chose to "have her have face-to-face misunderstandings instead." Parish worked with the original series editor Susan Hirschman and illustrator Lynn Sweat on his books.

In May 2014, Parish suffered a hemorrhagic stroke. Following his recovery, he dedicated the book Amelia Bedelia Cleans Up to two of his physicians. He died on February 10, 2024.

== Select works ==
=== Amelia Bedelia ===
- Good Driving, Amelia Bedelia (1995)
- Bravo, Amelia Bedelia! (1997)
- Amelia Bedelia 4 Mayor (1999)
- Calling Doctor Amelia Bedelia (2002)
- Amelia Bedelia, Bookworm (2003)
- Amelia Bedelia and the Christmas List* (2003)
- Amelia Bedelia Goes Back to School* (2004)
- Happy Haunting, Amelia Bedelia (2004)
- Be My Valentine, Amelia Bedelia* (2005)
- Amelia Bedelia, Rocket Scientist? (2005)
- Amelia Bedelia Under Construction (2006)
- Amelia Bedelia's Masterpiece (2007)
- Amelia Bedelia and the Cat (2008)
- Amelia Bedelia Talks Turkey (2008)
- Amelia Bedelia Bakes Off (2010)
- Go West, Amelia Bedelia! (2011)
- Amelia Bedelia Cub Reporter (2012)
- Good Work, Amelia Bedelia! (2012)

=== Young Amelia Bedelia ===
- Amelia Bedelia's First Day of School (2009)
- Amelia Bedelia's First Valentine (2009)
- Amelia Bedelia's First Apple Pie (2010)
- Amelia Bedelia's First Field Trip (2011)
- Amelia Bedelia Makes a Friend (2011)
- Amelia Bedelia's First Vote (2012)
- Amelia Bedelia Sleeps Over (2012)
- Amelia Bedelia Hits the Trail (2013)
- Amelia Bedelia Means Business (2013, chapter book)
- Amelia Bedelia Unleashed (2013, chapter book)
- Amelia Bedelia's First Library Card (2013)
- Amelia Bedelia Road Trip! (2013, chapter book)
- Amelia Bedelia Tries Her Luck (2013)
- Amelia Bedelia Goes Wild (2014, chapter book)
- Amelia Bedelia Shapes Up (2014, chapter book)
- Amelia Bedelia Cleans Up (2015, chapter book)
- Amelia Bedelia Sets Sail (2015, chapter book)
- Amelia Bedelia Dances Off (2015, chapter book)
- Amelia Bedelia On the Job (2016, chapter book)
- Amelia Bedelia Ties the Knot (2016, chapter book)
- Amelia Bedelia Makes a Splash (2017, chapter book)

Published by Greenwillow Books, an imprint of HarperCollins Publishers. Gatefold books (*) are published by HarperFestival.
