= Gahan Wilson =

American author, cartoonist and illustrator (1930–2019)

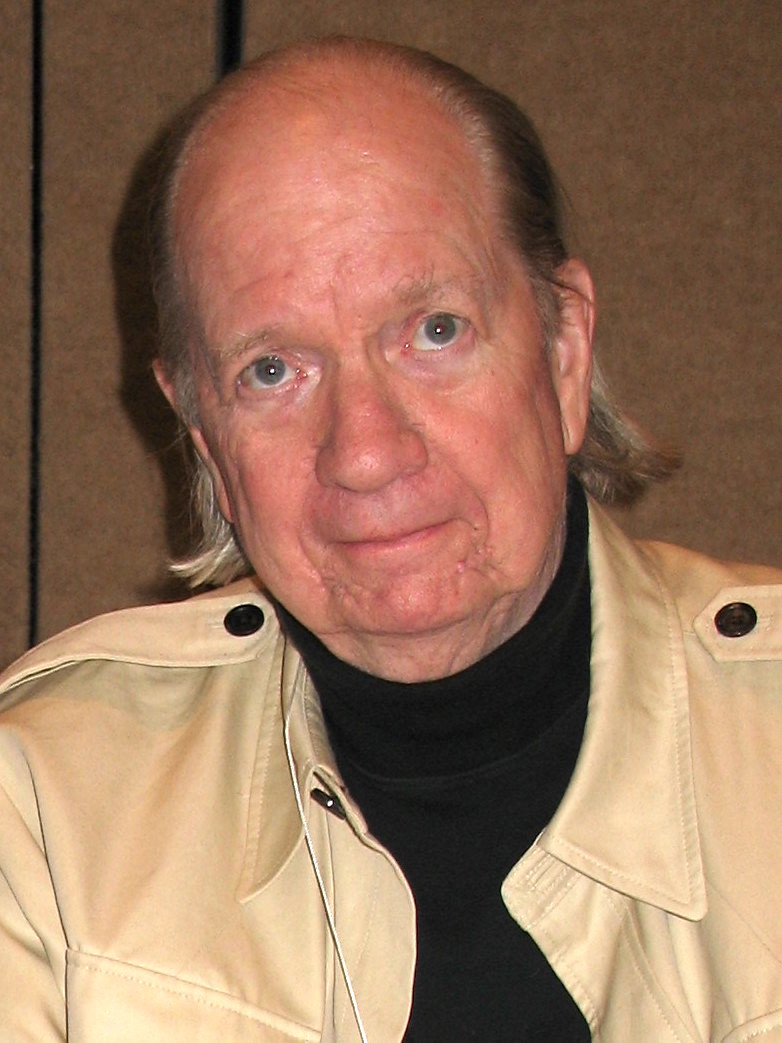
- Wilson at the World Horror Convention in 2007
- Born: Gahan Allen Wilson; February 18, 1930; Evanston, Illinois, U.S.
- Died: November 21, 2019 (aged 89); Scottsdale, Arizona, U.S.
- Known for: Cartoonist
- Spouse: Nancy Dee Midyette (m. 1966; died 2019)

Gahan Allen Wilson (February 18, 1930 – November 21, 2019) was an American author, cartoonist and illustrator known for his cartoons depicting horror-fantasy situations.

== Biography ==
Wilson was born in Evanston, Illinois, and was inspired by the work of the satiric Mad and Punch cartoonists, and 1950s science fiction films. His cartoons and prose fiction appeared regularly in Playboy, Collier's and The New Yorker for nearly 50 years. He was a regular contributor to the National Lampoon humor magazine. He published cartoons and film reviews for The Magazine of Fantasy & Science Fiction. From 1992 through end of publication, he prepared all the front covers for the annual book Passport to World Band Radio. Wilson was a movie review columnist for The Twilight Zone Magazine and a book critic for Realms of Fantasy magazine.

Wilson wrote and illustrated a short story for Harlan Ellison's anthology Again, Dangerous Visions (1972). He also contributed short stories to other publications; including "M1" and "The Zombie Butler" both of which appeared in The Magazine of Fantasy & Science Fiction and were reprinted in Gahan Wilson's Cracked Cosmos (1975). In 1975 he designed a small trophy, a bust of H. P. Lovecraft, to be given to winners of the World Fantasy Award; the bust was retired following the 2015 awards amid complaints about Lovecraft's history of racism. A new statuette designed by Vincent Villafranca depicting a tree in front of a full moon was released in 2017.

Wilson created a computer game, Gahan Wilson's The Ultimate Haunted House, with Byron Preiss. He wrote the 1992 animated short Diner.

In 2009, Fantagraphics Books released Gahan Wilson: 50 Years of Playboy Cartoons, a slipcased, three-volume collection of Wilson's cartoons and short stories for that magazine. A collection of his work, Fifty Years of Gahan Wilson, was published in 2010.

== Awards ==
Wilson was honored with three different lifetime achievement awards. He received the Bram Stoker Award for Lifetime Achievement in 1991. In 2005, he was recognized with a lifetime achievement award from the World Fantasy Awards. He also received the National Cartoonists Society's Milton Caniff Lifetime Achievement Award in 2005.

Wilson received additional awards for his work. In 1981 he won the World Fantasy Convention Award; the trophy was the Lovecraft bust he designed in 1975. In 1996 he received the Convention award for Artist. In 1989 he was honored with the Inkpot Award.

Wilson is the subject of a feature-length documentary film, Gahan Wilson: Born Dead, Still Weird, directed by Steven-Charles Jaffe.

He was an influence on later alternative cartoonists, including Gary Larson, John Callahan and Bill Plympton.

== Personal life ==
Wilson was married to author Nancy Winters (née Nancy Dee Midyette) from 1966 until her death in March 2019.

In 2019, Wilson's stepson Paul Winters announced that Wilson was suffering from advanced dementia. Wilson died from complications of dementia on November 21, 2019, in Scottsdale, Arizona.

== Bibliography ==
- Gahan Wilson's Graveside Manner (1965)
- The Man in the Cannibal Pot (1967)
- I Paint What I See (1971)
- * (1972) in Harlan Ellison (Ed.), Again, Dangerous Visions 2, Signet, New York, 1972
- Playboy's Gahan Wilson (i) (1973)
- Gahan Wilson's Cracked Cosmos (1975)
- The Weird World of Gahan Wilson (1975)
- And Then We'll Get Him! (1978)
- Nuts (strip collection) (1979)
- Playboy's Gahan Wilson (ii) (1980)
- Is Nothing Sacred? (1982) ISBN 978-0-312-43707-7
- Gahan Wilson's America (1985)
- Eddy Deco's Last Caper (1987)
- Everybody's Favorite Duck (1988)
- A Night in the Lonesome October (1993) (illustrated by Gahan Wilson; written by Roger Zelazny)
- Classics Illustrated: Edgar Allan Poe, The Raven and Other Poems (1990)
- Still Weird (1994)
- The Big Book of Weirdos (1995)
- Even Weirder (1996)
- The Big Book of Freaks (1996)
- The Cleft and Other Odd Tales (1998) (stories and illustrations by Gahan Wilson)
- Gravediggers' Party (2002)
- Monster Party (2003)
- The Best of Gahan Wilson (2004)
- Pop Art (2007) (illustrated by Gahan Wilson; written by Joe Hill. 52 hard covers signed by Mr. Hill, limited edition lettered from A to Z. Rare.)
- Gahan Wilson: 50 Years of Playboy Cartoons (2010) (slipcased three-volume set containing all of Wilson's cartoons for Playboy)
- Nuts: A Graphic Novel by Gahan Wilson (2011) (collects his entire Nuts comic strip, Fantagraphics)
- Gahan Wilson Sunday Comics (2013) (Publication Date: September 7, 2013)
- Gahan Wilson's Out There (2016) (collects material 1964–1981 from Magazine of Fantasy & Science Fiction)

=== Children's fantasy ===
- Matthew Looney series written by Jerome Beatty Jr., illustrated by Gahan Wilson:
  - Matthew Looney's Voyage to the Earth (1961)
  - Matthew Looney's Invasion of the Earth (1965)
  - Matthew Looney in the Outback (1969)
  - Matthew Looney and the Space Pirates (1972)
  - Maria Looney on the Red Planet (1977)
  - Maria Looney and the Cosmic Circus (1978)
  - Maria Looney and the Remarkable Robot (1978)
- Bob Fulton's Amazing Soda-pop Stretcher: An International Spy Story (1963) written by Jerome Beatty Jr., illustrated by Gahan Wilson
- Harry, the Fat Bear Spy (1973)
- Harry and the Sea Serpent (1976)
- Granny's Fish Story (1975)
- The Bang Bang Family (1974)
- Spooky Stories for a Dark and Stormy Night (1994)
- Didn't Didn't Do It (2007) written by Bradford Morrow, illustrated by Gahan Wilson

=== Books edited by Gahan Wilson ===
- Gahan Wilson's Favorite Tales of Horror (1976)
- The First World Fantasy Awards (1977)

== Sources ==
Some bibliographical information derived from The Encyclopedia of Fantasy ed. John Clute and John Grant.
