= Wallace Tripp =

American writer (1940–2018)

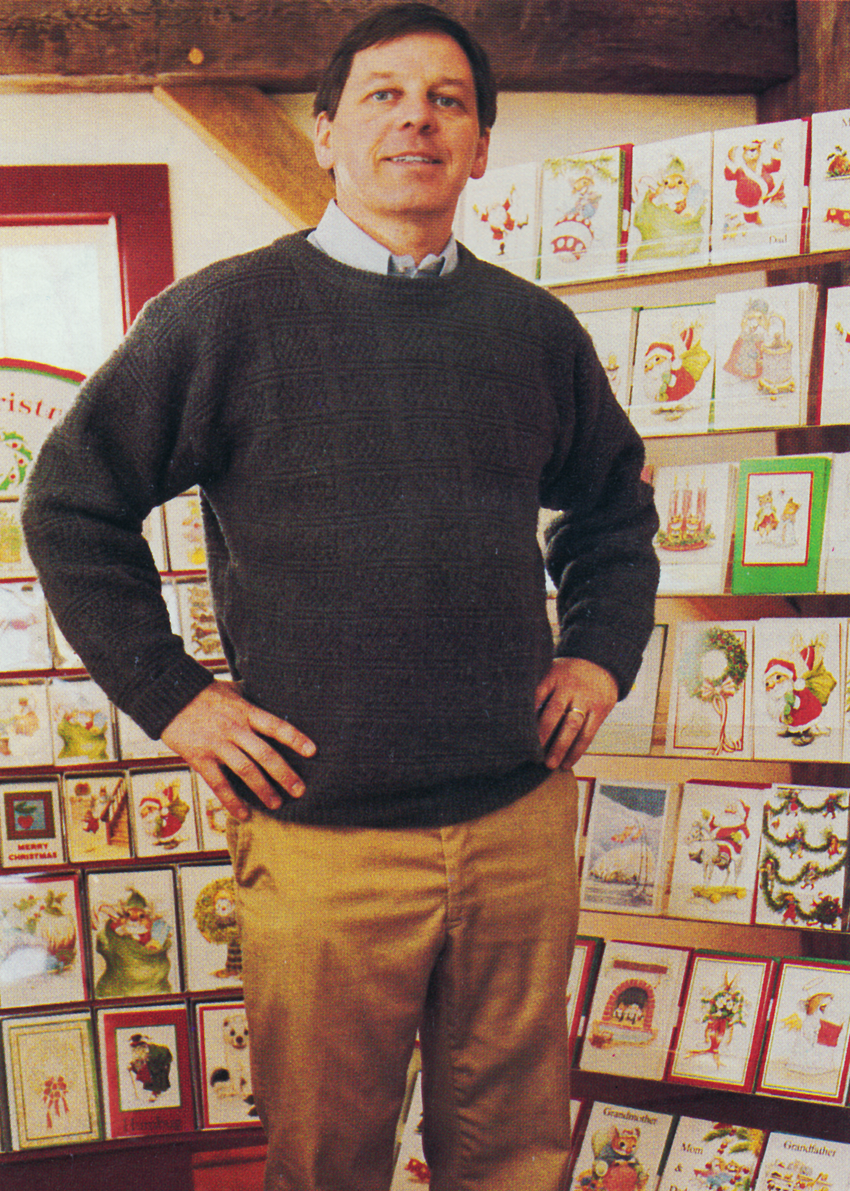
- Tripp in 1986
- Born: Wallace Whitney Tripp; June 26, 1940; Boston, Massachusetts, U.S.
- Died: September 9, 2018 (aged 78); Francestown, New Hampshire, U.S.
- Occupations: Illustrator, writer, anthologist
- Writing career
- Pen name: Wally Tripp
- Period: 1965-1999
- Genre: Children's literature
- Notable awards: Boston Globe–Horn Book Award; 1977
- Website: wallytripp.com

Wallace Whitney Tripp (June 26, 1940 – September 9, 2018) was an American illustrator, anthologist and author. He was known for creating anthropomorphic animal characters of emotional complexity and for his great visual and verbal humor. He was one of several illustrators of the Amelia Bedelia series of children's stories. He has illustrated over 40 books, including Marguerite, Go Wash Your Feet (1985), Wallace Tripp's Wurst Seller (1981), Casey at the Bat (1978) and A Great Big Ugly Man Came Up and Tied His Horse to Me (1973). Tripp also drew many greeting cards for the Pawprints line.

== Biography ==
Born in Boston, Massachusetts, June 26, 1940, Tripp grew up in rural New Hampshire and New York City. He attended the School of the Museum of Fine Arts, Boston (SMFA) where he studied graphic arts. He received a bachelor's degree in education from Keene State College and studied English at the University of New Hampshire. He then taught English for three years until choosing to devote himself full-time to illustration. Perhaps best known for his children's books, Tripp also illustrated over 600 greeting cards for family-run company Pawprints Greeting Cards, Inc. Marcy Tripp, then-wife and Tripp's agent, ran Pawprints and created the publishing house, Sparhawk Books, that published two of his books, Wallace Tripp's Wurst Seller and an illustrated edition of Hilaire Belloc's The Bad Child's Book of Beasts. During the 1980s, Tripp worked on animation projects with Richard Purdum's British studio. A lover of word-play, classical music, Tolkien, Shakespeare, and a pilot, Tripp frequently included references to these in his illustrations. in 1969 Tripp send J.R.R. Tolkien some of his illustrations for The Hobbit, and the letter Tolkien wrote in return was one of Tripp's prized possessions. For many years, Tripp built and flew radio-controlled model planes and sculpted pilot figures in his style.

Tripp was diagnosed with Parkinson's disease in 1986 and retired in 2000. He died in Francestown, New Hampshire, on September 9, 2018.

== Bibliography ==
- The Tale of a Pig: A Caucasian Folktale, McGraw, 1968.
- A Great Big Ugly Man Came Up and Tied His Horse to Me: A Book of Nonsense Verse, Little, Brown, 1973.
- My Uncle Podger: A Picture Book (based on a passage from Three Men in a Boat by Jerome K. Jerome), Little, Brown, 1975.
- Granfa' Grig Had a Pig and Other Rhymes without Reason from Mother Goose (verse), Little, Brown, 1976.
- Sir Toby Jingle's Beastly Journey (Junior Literary Guild selection), Coward, 1976.
- Rhymes without Reason from Mother Goose, World's Work, 1980.
- Wallace Tripp's Wurst Seller, Sparhawk, 1981. Marguerite, Go Wash Your Feet! (verse), Houghton, 1985.
- Rose's Are Red, Violet's Are Blue and Other Silly Poems, Little Brown & Co., 1999

== Bibliography as illustrator ==
- Reginald B. Hegarty, Rope's End, Houghton, 1965.
- Lisa Tsarelka, Stay Away From My Lawnmower, Houghton, 1965.
- Ruth Christoffer Carlsen, Henrietta Goes West, Houghton, 1966.
- Carlsen, Hildy and the Cuckoo Clock, Houghton, 1966.
- Ilse Kleberger, Grandmother Oma, Atheneum, 1967.
- Andrew Lang, editor, Read Me Another Fairy Tale, Grosset, 1967.
- Katherine E. Miller, Saint George: A Christmas Mummers' Play, Houghton, 1967.
- Gerald Dumas, Rabbits Rafferty, Houghton, 1968.
- Carlsen, Sam Bottleby, Houghton, 1968.
- Felice Holman, The Holiday Rat, and the Utmost Mouse (short stories), Norton, 1969.
- John Erwin, Mrs. Fox, Simon & Schuster, 1969.
- Scott Corbett, The Baseball Bargain, Little, Brown, 1970.
- Tom Paxton, Jennifer's Rabbit, Putnam, 1970.
- Rene Guillot, Little Dog Lost, translated by Joan Selby-Lowndes, Lothrup, 1970.
- Betty Brock, No Flying in the House, Harper, 1970.
- Ferdinand N. Monjo, Pirates in Panama, Simon & Schuster, 1970.
- Robert Sidney Bigelow, Stubborn Bear, Little, Brown, 1970.
- Julian Bagley, Candle-Lighting Time in Bodidalee (folktales), foreword by Alfred V. Frankenstein, American Heritage Publishing Co., 1971.
- Peggy Parish, Come Back, Amelia Bedelia, Harper, 1971.
- Victor Sharoff, The Heart of the Wood, Coward, 1971.
- Marguerita Rudolph, adapter, The Magic Egg, and Other Folk Stories of Rumania, Little, Brown, 1971.
- Peter Hallard, Puppy Lost in Lapland, F. Watts, 1971.
- Patricia Thomas, "Stand Back," Said the Elephant, "I'm Going to Sneeze!," Lothrup, 1971.
- Miriam Anne Bourne, Tigers in the Woods, Coward, 1971.
- Tony Johnston, The Adventures of Mole and Troll, Putnam, 1972.
- Cynthia Jameson, adapter, Catofy the Clever (folktale), Coward, 1972.
- Liesel Moak Skorpen, Old Arthur, Harper, 1972.
- Peggy Parish, Play Ball, Amelia Bedelia, Harper, 1972.
- Carolyn Lane, The Voices of Greenwillow Pond, Houghton, 1972.
- Boris Vladimirovich Zakhoder, The Crocodile's Toothbrush, translated by Marguerita Rudolph, McGraw, 1973.
- Malcolm Hall, Headlines, (Junior Literary Guild selection), Coward, 1973.
- Johnston, Mole and Troll Trim the Tree, (Junior Literary Guild selection), Putnam, 1974, revised edition, 1980.
- Jan Wahl, Pleasant Fieldmouse's Halloween Party, Putnam, 1974.
- Robert Fremlin, Three Friends, Little, Brown, 1975.
- Ernest Lawrence Thayer, Casey at the Bat: A Ballad of the Republic, Sung in the Year 1888 (verse), Coward, 1978.
- Hilaire Belloc, The Bad Child's Book of Beasts, revised edition, Sparhawk, 1982.

== Awards ==
- Granfa' Grig Had a Pig and Other Rhymes without Reason from Mother Goose (Little, Brown, 1976), which Tripp both wrote and illustrated, won the 1977 Boston Globe–Horn Book Award for Picture Books.
- A Great Big Ugly Man Came Up and Tied His Horse to Me: A Book of Nonsense Verse (Little, Brown, 1973) appeared on the ALA Notable Book for Children list.

== Sources ==
- Contemporary Authors Online, Gale, 2009. Reproduced in Biography Resource Center. Farmington Hills, Mich.: Gale, 2009.
- Kingman, L. et al. (1978). Illustrators of Children's Books 1967-1976, Horn Book, p. 164.
- Silvey, A., ed (1995). Children's Books and Their Creators, p. 651-653.
