= Juan Bobo (comic book) =

Comic book series of folk stories from Puerto Rico

- Cover of Juan Bobo and the Bag of Gold #1 (August 2013) [Benchmark Books]. Art by Jess Yeomans.

Publication information
- Publisher: Journal of American Folklore Walker & Company; Ediciones Librero; Ediciones Huracan; Dutton; HarperCollins; Turtleback Books; Troll Communications; Scholastic Books; Rayo; Ediciones Puertorriqueñas; Houghton Mifflin; August House; Benchmark Books; Hampton-Brown Reviewed by: Kirkus Reviews; Library Journal; Publishers Weekly; Booklist
- Format: Ongoing series
- Genre: Comic fantasy
- Publication date: 1921, 1973, 1979, 1981, 1993, 1994, 1995 (HarperCollins), 1995 (Dutton Lodestar), 1995 (Turtleback-Bernier), 1995 (Turtleback- Mike), 1997, 1998 (Troll), 1998 (Libero), 1999, 2000 (Rayo), 2000 (Hampton-Brown), 2003, 2004, 2006, 2008, 2013
- Main character(s): Juan Bobo

Creative team
- Created by: Originally: Puerto Rican school children Retold by: Virginia Schomp (Benchmark); Marisa Montes (HarperCollins); Felix Pitre (Dutton Books); Carmen T Bernier-Grand (HarperCollins); Ari Acevedo-Feliciano (August House); Bernice Chardiet (Walker & Co.); Maria Cadilla de Martinez and Jose Ramirez-Rivera (Ediciones Librero); Jan M. Mike (Troll Communications); Rosario Ferre (Ediciones Huracan); Jan M Mike (Turtleback)
- Written by: Puerto Rican school children
- Artist(s): Jess Yeomans (Benchmark); Joe Cepeda (HarperCollins); Christy Hale (Dutton Books); Ernesto Ramos Nieves [Photographer] (HC-2); Tom Wrenn (August); Charles Reasoner (Troll)

Collected editions
- ALSC Award: ISBN 978-0-6881-6234-4
- Belpre Award: ISBN 0-688-16234-7

Juan Bobo is a comic book series of folk stories from Puerto Rico, centered on the Juan Bobo children's character. For centuries, these folk stories have been passed from generation to generation amongst Puerto Rican schoolchildren, and the Juan Bobo comic books have been published in Puerto Rico, the United States and Spain, among other countries. For nearly two centuries a vast collection of books, songs, riddles and folktales have developed around the Juan Bobo character. Hundreds of children's books have been written about Juan Bobo in English and Spanish. There are at least 70 Juan Bobo stories. In 2002, the book Juan Bobo Goes to Work won the ALA Notable Books for Children Award and the Belpré Medal for its illustrations.

Juan Bobo stories are also used as instructional models in public school districts and libraries throughout the United States, and on PBS Television. The series was first published in the United States in 1921 by the Journal of American Folklore; the most recent series is in the American Legends and Folktales series published by Benchmark Publishers. When the comic books appeared for public mass sale in 1974, they were printed as standard 26-page hardcover children's comic books. Some publishers chose the 8x8 format as the book sales matured. They are designed for kindergarten and early grade children, aged four to eight.

== The Juan Bobo character ==
Often a trickster, sometimes a fool, Juan Bobo depicts a boy with a special way of doing things: with a good heart but little common sense. Juan Bobo tries to do exactly as his mother tells him, yet things always seem to go wrong - until they end up spectacularly right, as though Juan Bobo had an otherworldly, God-given genius. Due to this errant genius, Juan Bobo is Puerto Rico's most beloved noodlehead. For example, sent off by his mother to find work, Juan Bobo causes one disaster after another and always manages to lose his payment. In a typical Juan Bobo story his mother asks him to clean up a pig, so that she will fetch a higher price in the town market. Instead, Juan Bobo dresses her for church in his mother's best Sunday clothes, complete with lipstick and high heels. The stories incorporate a pícaro young man who roams the Puerto Rican countryside, moving from job to job, and disaster to disaster. Though Juan and his tricks constitute the main story interest, the satirical comments on various trades and professions give a wealth of information on the social, political and religious fabric of Puerto Rico. Juan Bobo is Puerto Rico's Amelia Bedelia.

== First U.S. collection ==
The first series of Juan Bobo stories published in the U.S. occurred in 1921. They appeared in the Journal of American Folklore under the title Porto Rican Folklore. The story collection consisted of 56 "Picaresque Tales" about Juan Bobo, and included such exotic titles as Juan Bobo Heats up his Grandmother, Juan Bobo Delivers a Letter to the Devil, Juan Bobo Throws his Brother Down a Well, and Juan Bobo Refuses to Marry the Princess. The first known publishing of the Juan Bobo stories in comic book format occurred in 1973; they were printed by the Walker and Company publishing house, authored by Bernice Chardiet and produced in hardcopy format. Despite this open and wide-scale plagiarism, the Journal of American Folklore congratulated J. Alden Mason for authoring "the most abundant and important Spanish folk-tale material collected in Spanish America."

== Target audiences ==
Published both in hardcover and paperback, the Juan Bobo books are used as elementary school teaching books, for bilingual language programs, and in Spanish-language studies throughout the United States Juan Bobo lesson plans and literacy activities accompany many of the books. The McGraw Hill company uses the books in a reading instruction series, which is used in public school districts throughout the United States. The Scholastic publishing company also offers Juan Bobo instruction modules to teachers around the US. August House publishers has a series of Juan Bobo teaching materials for national distribution, and the Greenwood Publishing Group also developed Juan Bobo materials to promote child literacy in classrooms and libraries. The American Legends children's books included Juan Bobo in a series of four folkloric books. Juan Bobo books and stories are stocked, and actively promoted, in public libraries in New York, North Carolina, Pennsylvania, and in library systems throughout the United States.

== Book sales ==
Book sellers throughout the United States carry a broad selection of Juan Bobo books. These can be found at Barnes & Noble, Amazon Books, Abe Books, and Powell Books, Newspapers around the U.S. regularly run Juan Bobo stories. The Juan Bobo stories are known in many countries, from the United States to Central and South America, the Caribbean, Spain and the Philippines. Juan Bobo books are sold in Great Britain. The National Library Board of Singapore has a listing of Juan Bobo books. In the Philippines, Juan Bobo stories go by the name "Lazy Juan". The National Library Board of Singapore has a listing of Juan Bobo books.

== Other media ==
On U.S. public television, the Juan Bobo stories are used by PBS stations in Alabama, Arkansas, California, Chicago, and Iowa, and in the nationwide PBS Learning Media system. Currently, Juan Bobo stories and radio dramas are regularly broadcast over radio stations in Puerto Rico. Juan Bobo CDs are also sold on the island and in the United States, as are Juan Bobo MP3 downloads.

In the theatrical arts, in New York City, Theatre Works USA developed and presented a Juan Bobo play, together with a children's study guide in 2008. The Teatro Círculo Theater Company mounted an Off-Broadway production of The Mischievous Juan Bobo in 2006. Also in 2006, the Open Eye Theater in Minneapolis performed The Adventures of Juan Bobo. This was followed in 2009 by the University Theater of Northeastern Illinois University presenting a Juan Bobo play titled Señora Tortuga. Children's theater companies enact the Juan Bobo stories, often in the form of puppet plays. In New York City, a group of grade school children made a Juan Bobo animated film, and children's Juan Bobo play scripts are available. In Colombia, the Corporación Artística La Polilla theatre company mounted a production of Juan Bobo y el Secreto de la Princesa (Juan Bobo and the Riddling Princess) in 2013.

In 1962, the Puerto Rican librarian Pura Belpré published the first Juan Bobo novel in the United States: Juan Bobo and the Queen's Necklace: A Puerto Rican Folk Tale. Belpré, throughout her life, collected many other folktales from Puerto Rico, translated them into English and had them published as children's literature. Juan Bobo and the Queen's Necklace is still in print, and appears in book catalogues throughout the United States. Today, the Pura Belpré Award is given annually by the American Library Association, in recognition of a Latino or Latina writer and illustrator whose work best portrays the Latino cultural experience in a work of literature for children or youth. In 2002 the Pura Belpré Award was given to Joe Cepeda for his illustration of Juan Bobo Goes to Work.

== Publishers ==
Juan Bobo children's books have been published in the U.S. and worldwide. Juan Bobo stories have been published by HarperCollins, Dutton Children's Books, Scholastic Books and many others, and reviewed by Kirkus Reviews, Library Journal, Publishers Weekly and Booklist. Following is a partial list of Juan Bobo book series publishers.

| Year | Publisher | Location | Title | Format | Author | Artist | Language |
|---|---|---|---|---|---|---|---|
| 1921 | Journal of American Folklore | New York, NY | 56 Picaresque Porto Rican Folk Tales | Softcover | JAF | JAF | Spanish |
| 1973 | Walker & Co. | New York, NY | Juan Bobo and the Pig: A Puerto Rican Folktale Retold | Softcover | Bernice Chardiet | Hope Meryman | English |
| 1979 | Ediciones Libero | Mayagüez, PR | Los Cuentos de Juan Bobo | Paperback | María C. Martínez, María Cadilla de Martínez, José Ramirez Rivera | Freda Barbarika | Spanish |
| 1981 | Ediciones Huracán | San Juan, PR | Los Cuentos de Juan Bobo | Paperback | Rosario Ferré | | Spanish |
| 1993 | Dutton | New York, NY | Juan Bobo and the Pig | Hardcover | Félix Pitre | Chris Hale | English |
| 1994 | HarperCollins | New York, NY | Juan Bobo: Four Folktales from Puerto Rico (an I Can Read Book) | Hardcover | Carmen T Bernier-Grand | | English |
| 1995 | HarperCollins | New York, NY | Juan Bobo: Four Folktales From Puerto Rico (I Can Read Book 3) | Paperback | Carmen T. Bernier-Grand | | English |
| 1995 | Dutton Lodestar | New York, NY | Juan Bobo and the Pig | Hardcover | Félix Pitre | Chris Hale | English |
| 1995 | Turtleback | St. Louis, MO | Juan Bobo: Four Folktales From Puerto Rico | Hardcover | Carmen T. Bernier-Grand | | English |
| 1995 | Turtleback | St. Louis, MO | Juan Bobo: Four Folktales From Puerto Rico | Hardcover | Jan M. Mike | | English |
| 1997 | Troll Comm | Mahway, NJ | Juan Bobo and the Horse of Seven Colors: A Puerto Rican Legend | Hardcover | Jan M. Mike | Charles Reasoner | English |
| 1998 | Troll Comm | Mahway, NJ | Juan Bobo and the Horse of Seven Colors (a Puerto Rican Legend) | Paperback | Jan M. Mike | Charles Reasoner | English |
| 1998 | Ediciones Libero | Mayagüez, PR | Los Cuentos de Juan Bobo | Paperback | María Cadilla de Martínez, José Ramirez Rivera | | Spanish |
| 1999 | Scholastic | New York, NY | Juan Bobo: Four Folktales From Puerto Rico (an I Can Read Book) | Hardcover | Carmen T. Bernier-Grand | Ernesto Ramos Nieves | English |
| 2000 | Rayo | New York, NY | Juan Bobo Goes to Work: A Puerto Rican Folk Tale | Hardcover | Marisa Montes | Joe Cepeda | English |
| 2000 | Hampton-Brown | Columbus, OH | Juan Bobo Goes Up and Down the Hill A Puerto Rican Folk Tale | Paperback | Marisa Montes | Maurie J. Manning | English |
| 2003 | Publicaciones Puertorriqueñas | San Juan, PR | Aventuras de Juan Bobo | Unknown | María Inéz Forasteri | | Spanish |
| 2004 | Houghton Mifflin | Boston, MA | Juan Bobo Takes a Long Walk | Paperback | Julián Rojas | Cindy Revell | English |
| 2006 | Rayo | New York, NY | Juan Bobo Busca Trabajo | Paperback | Marisa Montes | Joe Cepeda | Spanish |
| 2008 | August House | Little Rock, AR | Juan Bobo Sends the Pig to Mass | Paperback | Ari Acevedo Feliciano | Tom Wrenn | English and Spanish |
| 2013 | Benchmark | Pelham, NY | Juan Bobo and the Bag of Gold (American Legends and Folktales) | Hardcover | Virginia Schomp | Jess Yeomans | English |
| 2023 | self-published | Hamden, CT | Juan Bobo: Cuentos Insólitos | Paperback | Ricardo A. Domínguez | Ángel Flores Guerra B. | Spanish |

== See also ==
- Folk literature
- Latin American literature
- Puerto Rican literature
- Puerto Rican comic books
