= Amelia Bedelia =

Fictional character

- The first book, Amelia Bedelia, featuring the most common depiction of Amelia (2023 reprinting)
- Author: Peggy Parish; Herman Parish
- Illustrator: Wallace Tripp; Fritz Siebel; Lynn Sweat; Lynne Avril; Barbara Siebel Thomas
- Country: United States
- Language: English
- Genre: Children's literature
- Publisher: HarperCollins
- Published: 1963–1988, 1995–2022
- Media type: Print
- No. of books: 41 (List of books)

Amelia Bedelia is a series of American children's books that were written by Peggy Parish from 1963 until her death in 1988, and by her nephew, Herman, from 1995 to 2022. The stories follow Amelia Bedelia, a maid who repeatedly misunderstands various commands of her employer by taking figures of speech and various terminology literally, causing her to perform incorrect actions with a comical effect. They have been illustrated by Wallace Tripp, Fritz Siebel, Lynn Sweat, Lynne Avril, and Barbara Siebel Thomas.

As of 2013, the book series had sold over 35 million copies, plus 11 million more copies through a licensing deal through Scholastic.

== Description ==
Amelia Bedelia is a series of American children's books beginning with Amelia Bedelia in 1963. They were written by Peggy Parish until her death in 1988. Herman Parish, Peggy's nephew, contributed new stories to the series from 1995 to 2022. Many of the books are published as part of the I Can Read! series, levels 1 and 2.

=== Premise ===
The stories follow Amelia Bedelia, a maid who repeatedly misunderstands various commands of her employer by taking figures of speech and various terminology literally, with comical results. For example, she interprets a request to "put the lights out" as a request to physically put the light bulbs outside. Other examples include "tag a player out" when playing baseball resulting in her placing an actual tag on the player and then picking up the person to ask how far out they should be.

Part of the reason given for this behavior is that she comes from a family who takes everything literally: she works primarily as a maid for a wealthy couple known as the Rogers, who are astute enough to realize her literalism and write their requests as "un-dust the furniture" and "put the wet towels in the laundry and replace them with clean dry ones", as opposed to simply "change the towels".

She, however, almost always manages to win everyone over at the end with her excellent cooking, particularly desserts.

=== Illustrations ===
The books have been illustrated by Wallace Tripp, Fritz Siebel, Lynn Sweat and Lynne Avril. In 1992 HarperCollins republished the three original stories (Amelia Bedelia; Thank You, Amelia Bedelia; and Amelia Bedelia and the Surprise Shower) with illustrations by Fritz Siebel's daughter, Barbara Siebel Thomas.

== Characters ==
- Amelia Bedelia is a maid who takes her orders too literally.
- Mrs. Rogers is an employer who often gets angry at Amelia Bedelia's mistakes.
- Mr. Rogers is a husband of Mrs. Rogers.

== Authorship change ==
Following Parish's death, her nephew, Herman Parish, took over the writing of the book series in 1995. In 2009, Herman Parish began writing books about Amelia Bedelia's own childhood experiences, starting with Amelia Bedelia's First Day of School, illustrated by Lynne Avril. In 2013, Herman Parish began writing Amelia Bedelia chapter books, starting with Amelia Bedelia Means Business.

== List of books ==
Amelia Bedelia books by Peggy Parish
Original series
- Amelia Bedelia (1963)
- Thank You, Amelia Bedelia (1964)
- Amelia Bedelia and the Surprise Shower (1966)
- Come Back, Amelia Bedelia (1971)
- Play Ball, Amelia Bedelia (1972)
- Good Work, Amelia Bedelia (1976)
- Teach Us, Amelia Bedelia (1977)
- Amelia Bedelia Helps Out (1979)
- Amelia Bedelia and the Baby (1981)
- Amelia Bedelia Goes Camping (1985)
- Merry Christmas, Amelia Bedelia (1986)
- Amelia Bedelia's Family Album (1988)

Amelia Bedelia books by Herman Parish
Adult Amelia cont.	Amelia's childhood series	Young Amelia chapter books
Good Driving, Amelia Bedelia (1995); Bravo, Amelia Bedelia! (1997); Amelia Bedelia 4 Mayor (1999); Calling Doctor Amelia Bedelia (2002); Amelia Bedelia and the Christmas List (2003); Amelia Bedelia, Bookworm (2003); Happy Haunting, Amelia Bedelia (2004); Amelia Bedelia Goes Back to School (2004); Be My Valentine, Amelia Bedelia (2005); Amelia Bedelia, Rocket Scientist? (2005); Amelia Bedelia Under Construction (2006); Amelia Bedelia's Masterpiece (2007); Amelia Bedelia and the Cat (2008); Amelia Bedelia Talks Turkey (2008); Amelia Bedelia Bakes Off (2010); Go West, Amelia Bedelia! (2011); Amelia Bedelia, Cub Reporter (2012)	Amelia Bedelia's First Day of School (2009); Amelia Bedelia's First Valentine (2009); Amelia Bedelia's First Apple Pie (2010); Amelia Bedelia's First Field Trip (2011); Amelia Bedelia Makes a Friend (2011); Amelia Bedelia's First Vote (2012); Amelia Bedelia Sleeps Over (2012); Amelia Bedelia Hits the Trail (2013); Amelia Bedelia's First Library Card (2013); Amelia Bedelia Tries her Luck (2013); Amelia Bedelia Joins the Club (2014); Amelia Bedelia Chalks One Up (2014); Amelia Bedelia Is for the Birds (2015); Amelia Bedelia by the Yard (2016); Amelia Bedelia Takes the Cake (2016); Amelia Bedelia on the Move (2017); Amelia Bedelia Gets a Break (2018); Amelia Bedelia Under the Weather (2019); Amelia Bedelia Gets the Picture (2019); 5-Minute Amelia Bedelia Stories (2020); Amelia Bedelia Steps Out (2021)	Amelia Bedelia Means Business (2013); Amelia Bedelia Unleashed (2013); Amelia Bedelia Road Trip! (2013); Amelia Bedelia Goes Wild (2014); Amelia Bedelia Shapes Up (2014); Amelia Bedelia Cleans Up (2015); Amelia Bedelia Sets Sail (2015); Amelia Bedelia Dances Off (2015); Amelia Bedelia on the Job (2016); Amelia Bedelia Ties the Knot (2016); Amelia Bedelia Makes a Splash (2017); Amelia Bedelia Digs In (2018); Amelia Bedelia & Friends: Beat the Clock (2019); Amelia Bedelia & Friends: The Cat's Meow (2019); Amelia Bedelia Wraps It Up (2020); Amelia Bedelia Lost and Found (2020); Amelia Bedelia & Friends: Arise and Shine (2020); Amelia Bedelia & Friends Paint the Town (2020); Amelia Bedelia Scared Silly (2021); Amelia Bedelia & Friends Mind Their Manners (2021); Amelia Bedelia & Friends Blast Off (2021); Amelia Bedelia Hops to It (2022)

== Adaptations ==
Several theatre productions have been produced based on the series, including by the Serendipity Theatre Company in West Hollywood, California, in 1994, the Omaha Theater for Young People in 2001; the San Diego Junior Theatre in 2002; the SCERA Theatre in Orem, Utah, in 2008; and the Art Centre Theatre in Plano, Texas, in 2011.

Universal Pictures and Playtone partners Tom Hanks and Gary Goetzman reportedly bought the rights to produce a live-action feature film adaptation of Amelia Bedelia in 2005, but the project never materialized.

== Popular culture ==
- There is a statue of Amelia Bedelia, the protagonist and title character of the series, in Peggy Parish's hometown of Manning, South Carolina.
- In 2021, an episode of This American Life featured a segment based on the character, reimagining her as working from home amidst the COVID-19 pandemic.

== See also ==
- Till Eulenspiegel, a German folk-hero with a similar penchant for interpreting figurative language literally.
- Juan Bobo
- Mr. Logic, a character who takes everything people say to him literally from the British adult comic book Viz.
