= Alice Low =

American writer

Alice Low (1926 – 2012) was an American author, lyricist, and editor. Over the course of a 60-year career she wrote more than 25 books for children, edited five anthologies, and wrote the book and lyrics for a musical based on one of her books.

== Career ==
Four of Low’s books are about witches because, she said, “with witches anything can happen.” In her most popular book, The Witch Who Was Afraid of Witches (1978), Low tells the story of a young witch, Wendy, whose older bossy sisters tell her she will never learn to fly on a broomstick, mix potions, or make up rhyming spells like they can. One Halloween, with the help of a friendly trick-or-treater, Wendy finds her self-confidence, decisively out-witching her sisters. The I-Can-Read! version was on The New York Times Children’s Paperback Bestseller list. Low adapted the book into a short animated film and wrote the book and lyrics for the musical of the same name (music by Jacob Stern), first performed in 1993 and later at the Emelin Theater.

The idea for her book Witches’ Holiday (1971; illustrated by Tony Walton) was inspired by Low’s youngest child’s fears about witches in his closet at night. In verse, Low reassures the boy that if he leaves the closet door open at bedtime, the witches will come out for one night of play and then, exhausted, fly away for good.

Early in Low’s career she wrote two Little Golden Books: Open Up My Suitcase (1954) and Out Of My Window (1955). She returned to the theme of what children see in and out of windows in David’s Windows (1974), illustrated by Tomie dePaolo. Her book Summer (1963), illustrated by Roy McKie, was part of the Beginner Books series. Low wrote Summer in verse using only the words on the limited Beginner Book list. The book celebrates the joys of summer for children, has been published in at least six physical editions, and is currently available in e-book format. With publication of the eighth version of The Witch Who Was Afraid of Witches, Low became one of the few authors to have written both an I-Can-Read! book and a Beginner Book.

Low wrote in verse about a mother’s workday in her book Mommy’s Briefcase (1995), illustrated by Aliki, which has pockets with briefcase contents that children can pull out and play with.

Low’s books have won a number of special notices. Her adaptation of Greek myths and legends, The Simon & Schuster Book of Greek Gods and Heroes (first published by Macmillan in 1985), won the Washington Irving Children’s Book Choice Award, and was selected by the Children’s Book Council as the Notable Children’s Trade Book in the Field of Social Studies in 1986. Many of her books have been children’s Book Club selections. Four of her books were published in a foreign language (Japanese, French).

She edited five anthologies and published short stories and many poems. Her poem “A Merry Literary Christmas”, an ode to giving books as gifts, was printed in Publishers Weekly and included in her anthology, The Family Read-Aloud Christmas Treasury (1989, illustrated by Marc Brown).

Low also reviewed children’s books for The New York Times, taught creative writing, was the editor for the Children’s Choice Book Club, and wrote educational filmstrips. She wrote the lyrics for the song Trick or Treat for Unicef (1958), which was recorded by singers such as Mary Martin and Ray Bolger, as well as the lyrics for songs on the Tom Glazer album Noisy and Quiet/Big and Little.

Many of Low’s manuscripts and notes are housed in the Kerlan Collection, part of the University of Minnesota’s Children's Literature Research Collection.

== Personal life ==
Low grew up in New York City. Her mother co-authored four children’s books, and people from the arts world were often guests in her parents’ apartment. She wrote lyrics for shows in high school and at Smith College. She also studied short story writing at Columbia University. She and her husband moved to Briarcliff Manor, New York, where they raised their three children. Low wrote lyrics for songs performed at her college reunions and many witty poems.

== Selected works ==
- Open Up My Suitcase (Simon and Schuster,1954), English and French
- Out of My Window (Simon and Schuster,1955)
- Grandmas and Grandpas (Random House, 1962)
- Summer (Random House Beginner Books, 1963 and 1991 and other editions; Bright and Early Board Books, 1991)
- A Day of Your Own: Your Birthday, girls and boys editions (Random House, 1964)
- Kallie’s Corner (Pantheon Books, 1966)
- At Jasper’s House and Other Stories (Pantheon Books,1968)
- Witches’ Holiday (Pantheon Books, 1971; Scholastic Cartwheel Books,1997; Scholastic Canada, 1998), English and French
- Herbert’s Treasure (G.P. Putnam's Sons,1971)
- David’s Windows (G.P. Putnam's Sons,1974)
- The Witch Who Was Afraid of Witches (Pantheon Books, 1978; HarperCollins,1978; Scholastic Tab Publications, 1978; HarperCollins: An I Can Read Picture Book, 1999, An I Can Read Chapter Book, 1999; I Can Read! Level 4, 2000; Barnes & Noble Publishing, Inc., by arrangement with HarperCollins, 2006). English and French
- Genie and the Witch's Spell (Alfred A. Knopf, 1982 and 1991; Random House, 1991), English and Japanese
- All Through the Town (Random House, 1984)
- All Around the Farm (Random House,1984)
- The Simon and Schuster Book of Greek Gods and Heroes (originally published by Macmillan, 1985, Simon and Schuster, 2002;)
- Zena and the Witch Circus (Dial Books,1990)
- The Quilted Elephant and the Green Velvet Dragon (Simon and Schuster, 1991)
- A Young Painter: The Life and Paintings of Wang Yani—China's Extraordinary Young Artist, with Zheng Zhensun (Scholastic, 1991)
- The Popcorn Shop (Scholastic, 1993)
- Mommy's Briefcase (Scholastic, 1995)
- Aunt Lucy Went to Buy a Hat (HarperCollins, 2004)
- Blueberry Mouse (Mondo Publishing, 2004)
- The Fastest Game on Two Feet (Holiday House, 2009)

Anthologies (selections by Alice Low)

- The Family Read-Aloud Christmas Treasury (Little, Brown and Company, 1989)
- The Family Read Aloud Holiday Treasury (Little, Brown and Company, 1991)
- Spooky Stories for a Dark and Stormy Night (Hyperion, 1994)
- Stories to Tell a Five Year Old (Little, Brown and Company, 1996)
- Stories to Tell a Six Year Old (Little, Brown and Company, 1997)
