= Leonard Kessler =

American author and illustrator (1920–2022)

Leonard Kessler (October 28, 1920 – February 16, 2022) was an American children's book author and illustrator who published more than 200 books, including more than 45 in collaboration with his wife Ethel Kessler. His books include Mr. Pine's Purple House.

== Early life and education ==
Leonard Kessler was born in Akron, Ohio and grew up in Pittsburgh, Pennsylvania. His father, Albert, was a plumber and his mother, Lillian, was a nursing assistant. He recalled his grandmother giving him crayons when he was six years old, and telling him, "Lenny, take this crayon; you can make your own world." From 1942 to 1945 Kessler served in the United States Army during World War II, and he used his artistic abilities to sketch enemy gun emplacements as a scout stationed in Europe. "I vowed that if I ever got out of that alive, I would never worry again" he later said.

In 1949, Kessler received his bachelor's degree in fine arts from Carnegie Mellon University, where he shared a studio with the artists Andy Warhol and Philip Pearlstein, with whom he remained friends.

== Career ==
After a short stint working on educational television scripts, Kessler was asked if he had thought about children's literature. His first book, "What’s in a line? A first book of graphic expression", was published in 1951. Kessler went on to write and illustrate more than 200 books for young readers, including about 45 that he created in collaboration with his wife, Ethel Kessler.

Kessler often worked on about six books at a time. He said, "I really dig working for kids." For inspiration he gathered neighborhood children to sit in a circle and talk with him, and recorded the sessions. Sometimes he crouched down to experience life from children's height. Kessler said that when writing, "I find I have to try to find the kid I used to be." He wrote many drafts of his stories, and said, "Much as in sculpting, the simpler the better." He frequently found inspiration in his own children, and wrote Here Comes the Strikeout! (1965) after his son struck out 22 times in a row in Little League Baseball.

=== Mr. Pine's Purple House ===
The New York Times selected three of Kessler's books as "Best Illustrated Books of the Year": Fast Is Not a Ladybug (1954) and Heavy Is a Hippopotamus (1955) by Miriam Schlein, and The Big Red Bus (1957) by Kessler and his wife Ethel.

In 1965, Kessler published Mr. Pine’s Purple House about a man who wanted his house to stand out from all the plain white houses in his neighborhood. In 2000, the book was reissued after being out of print since the 1970s by a mother and fan, Jill Morgan, who struggled to find affordable copies for her children. Kessler said to the Tampa Bay Times in 2005, "Certain angels come into our lives at the right moment", and that Morgan's reprint "gave me back my life again." Throughout the reissue process Kessler used Adobe Photoshop and other computer programs, which he described as "a whole new wonderful life." Mr. Pine's Purple House was a favorite childhood book of Jeff Bezos, founder and CEO of Amazon. Following the reissue, the book reached new popularity after Bezos’ mother discovered it and prompted her son to promote it in a weekly email to customers. Bezos said upon the 2014 introduction of the Fire Phone that the device was inspired in part by Mr. Pine's Purple House.

Much like the main character in Mr. Pine's Purple House, Kessler enjoyed the color purple. He said, "I have a purple door. I have a purple studio. … I think purple is a color that vibrates. I think it’s me." Kessler's license plate read "MR PINE".

== Personal life and family ==
Kessler met his future wife Ethel Kessler, a social worker and kindergarten teacher, in his childhood neighborhood in Pittsburgh. They married after he returned from the war in 1946, and had two children. In 1953, the Kessler family moved upstate to a house in New City that was painted light purple, and sublet their Manhattan apartment to Andy Warhol and his mother, who brought her 25 cats all named Sam. Kessler has said, "My work is my hobby."

Leonard and Ethel Kessler retired to Sarasota, Florida in the 1990s. Ethel developed Alzheimer's disease, and lived in a care facility before her death in 2002. Kessler said throughout his life, including at age 80, "I keep searching every morning for that 6-year-old kid I used to be." He died on February 16, 2022, at age 101 at his home in Sarasota.

== Bibliography ==
- Adventures With Straw (1967)
- Age Of Aquarius: You And Astrology (1979)
- All Aboard The Train (1964)
- All For Fall (1974)
- Are There Hippos On The Farm? (1987)
- Are There Seals In The Sandbox? (1990)
- Are We Lost, Daddy? (1967)
- Are You Square? (1966)
- The Big Mile Race (1983)
- Binky Brothers And The Fearless Four (1970)
- A Book Of Flying Saucers For You (1973)
- A Book Of Satellites For You (1971)
- A Book Of Stars For You (1967)
- Colossal Fossils: Dinosaur Riddles (1987)
- Cowboys: What Do They Do?(1972)
- The Day Daddy Stayed Home (1959) with Ethel Kessler
- Did You Ever Hear A Klunk Say Please? (1967)
- Do Baby Bears Sit In Chairs? (1961)
- Ducks Don't Get Wet (1965)
- The Ellipse (1971)
- The Family Under The Moon (1976)
- The Forgetful Pirate (1974)
- Grandpa Witch And The Magic Doobelator (1981)
- Hello, Aurora (1974)
- Here Comes The Strikeout (1965)
- Homer The Hunter (1972)
- How To Play Better Basketball (1968)
- Is There A Horse In Your House? (1990)
- Is There An Elephant In Your Kitchen? (1987)
- Kick, Pass, And Run (1966)
- Last One In Is A Rotten Egg (1969)
- Mr. Pine's Mixed-Up Signs (1961)
- Mr. Pine's Purple House (1965)
- Last One In Is A Rotten Egg (1969)
- Mr. Pine's Storybook (1982)
- Mrs. Pine Takes A Trip (1966)
- Night Story (1981)
- Ocean Wonders (1965)
- Old Turtle's 90 Knock-Knocks, Jokes, And Riddles (1991)
- Old Turtle's Baseball Stories (1982)
- Old Turtle's Riddle And Joke Book (1986)
- Old Turtle's Soccer Team (1988)
- Old Turtle's Winter Games (1983)
- On Your Mark, Get Set, Go!
- The Pirates' Adventure On Spooky Island (1979)
- The Sad Tale Of The Careless Klunks (1965)
- Slush, Slush! (1973)
- Stan The Hot Dog Man (1990)
- Super Bowl (1980)
- The Sweeneys From 9d (1985)
- That's Not Santa (1981)
- Tommy Learns To Drive A Tractor (1958)
- Too Many Rabbits (1974)
- Truck Drivers: What Do They Do? (1967)
- Two, Four, Six, Eight: A Book About Legs (1980)
- What Do They Do? Policemen And Firemen (1962)
- What Do You Play On A Summer Day? (1977)
- What's Inside The Box? (1976)
- What's Up, Doc?: Doctor & Dentist Jokes (1984)
- Who Tossed That Bat? Safety On The Ballfield And Playground (1973)
- The Worm, The Bird, And You; A Long And Short Look At The World About You (1962)
- The Worst Team Ever (1985)
