= Emelin Theatre =

Coordinates: 40.94920°N 73.73401°W

The Emelin Theatre for the Performing Arts is a 264-seat nonprofit theater located in Mamaroneck, NY. that hosts theatre, family, bluegrass, dance, classical, jazz, rock, folk, tribute, and comedy events, plus a broad range of independent and contemporary films for the community, and is the oldest continually operated performing arts center in Westchester.

== History ==
The Emelin Theatre was founded in 1972 by a group of Mamaroneck citizens and named after local pharmacist Arthur Emelin, who died in 1978. Its facility originated with a $360,000 gift to the Mamaroneck Free Library by Emelin in memory of his father, Emanuel Joseph Emelin.

The structure of the current theater was built in 1984. In 2013, the Emelin's lobby underwent a $250,000 renovation to make it more modern and accessible. The New Rochelle-based architecture firm Stoll & Stoll donated their services to the Emelin, which paid no fees for the design of the new facility.

The first theater company to perform in the Emelin was The New England Westchester (NEW) Group theater founded by John Fotia. The first play was "Eh?" by Henry Livings. The second production was also the first musical, "A Funny Thing Happened on the way to the Forum. Both directed by Mr. Fotia.

The Emelin Theatre upgraded film capabilities to a DCP projection system in 2016.

== Events and activities ==
It hosts music series devoted to rock, folk, classical, jazz, tribute bands, and traditional musical forms from multiple traditions. Its five-time IBMA nominated bluegrass series has existed since 1982. It also features theater, dance, comedy, family films, and a subscription-only film series. Approximately one-third of its programming is family-oriented, and since 1997 its subsidized School Outreach Program has brought children from Westchester County schools to the Emelin for educational programming.

The Emelin has assisted listening devices available, and accessible seating is located in the first four rows of the theatre.

It currently hosts between 80 and 100 performances per year, with a combined attendance of approximately 30,000.
