= James Janeway =

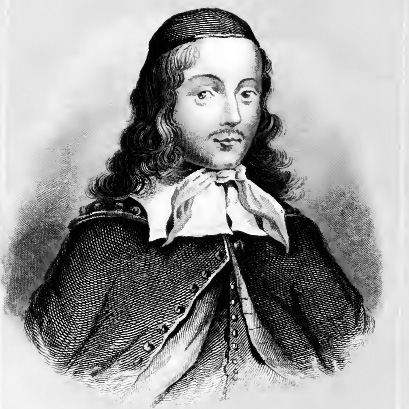
- Puritan minister and author
- Born: 1636; Lilley, Hertfordshire, England
- Died: 1674 (aged 37–38); London, England

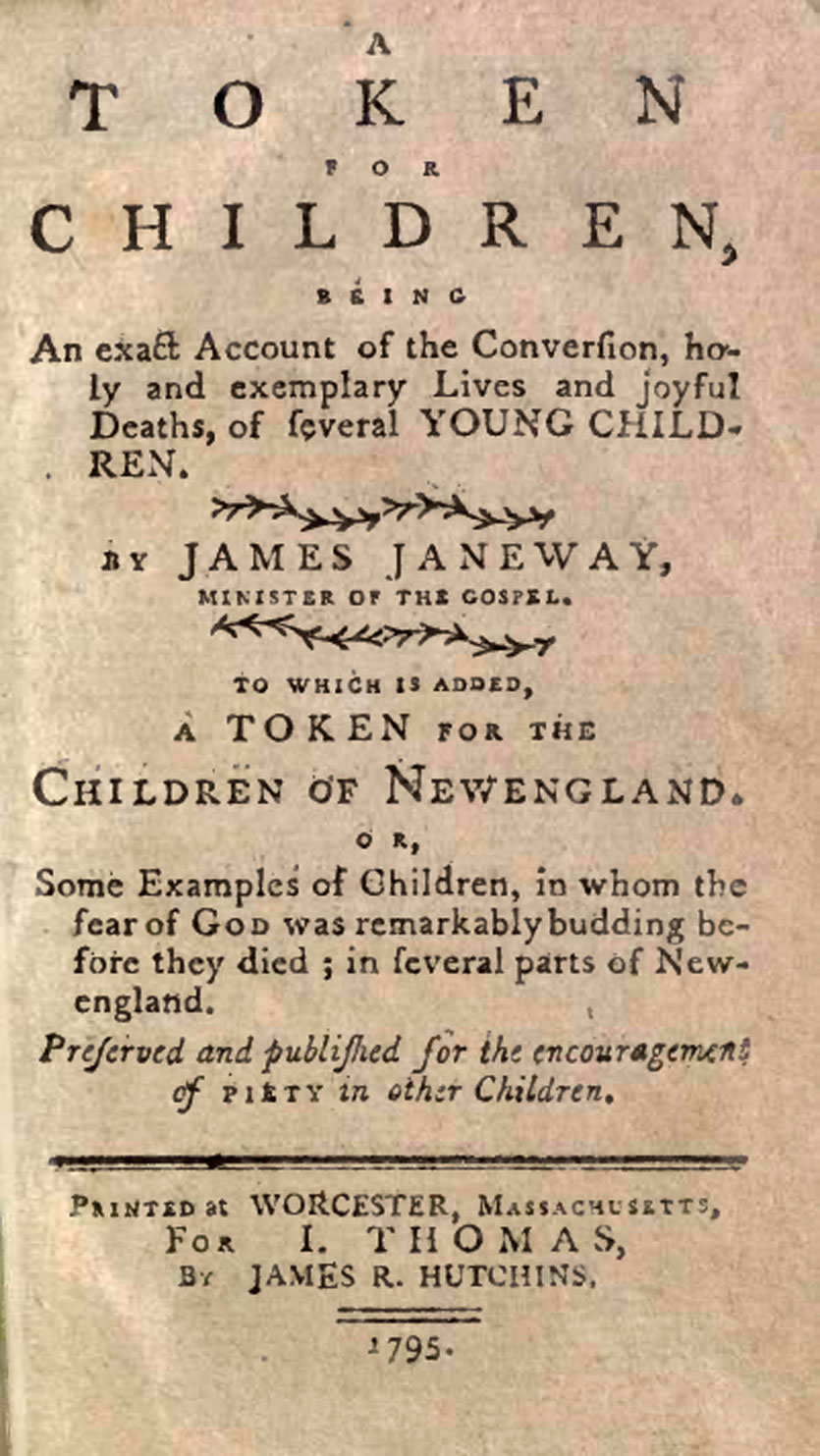
The title page of A Token For Children in 1795.

James Janeway (1636–1674) was a Puritan minister and author who, after John Bunyan, had the widest and longest popularity as the author of works read by English-speaking children.

== Life ==
Janeway was born at Lilley, in Hertfordshire, the son of William Janeway, a minister of Kershall, at the end of 1636. He was educated at Christ Church, Oxford, graduating with a B.A. and spent time as a private tutor in a home, like many of the Puritans. He is listed as one of the "ejected" or "silenced" ministers by the Act of Uniformity 1662. The first evidence that he functioned as a non-conformist preacher is from the year 1665 at the time of the Great Plague of London. He was then witness to the second great national calamity in the Great Fire of London in 1666.

In 1672 his congregation built a large meeting house for him near London at Rotherhithe, where it is said that

he had a very numerous auditory, and a great reformation was wrought amongst many.

But Janeway's popularity caused the Church of England to threaten to have him shot. This was actually attempted on at least two occasions, on one of which a bullet pierced his hat but missed his body. Soldiers destroyed the building in which he preached, but his congregation simply built another, larger one big enough for all those who came to hear him preach.

Janeway was afflicted with melancholy, contracted tuberculosis, and died in his 38th year. All of his five brothers died of tuberculosis before the age of 40. He was buried in St Mary Aldermanbury next to his father.

The book for which Janeway is most known is A Token for Children, in which he collected personal accounts of the conversions of a number of children under his pastoral care, and published it. In the introduction, Janeway asks,

Are the souls of your children of no value? They are not too little to die.. not too little to go to hell.. not too little to serve their great Master, not too little to go to heaven.

It became an effective evangelistic tool, and was the most widely read book in nurseries in England next to the Bible and Pilgrim's Progress by John Bunyan. The New England preacher Cotton Mather regarded that book so highly that he wrote his own version of it and called it A Token for the Children of New England.

Janeway also wrote "Upon Earth: Jesus, The Best Friend in the Worst Times". He was among the signers of the 1673 Puritan Preface to the Scottish Metrical Psalms and contributed one of the "Cripplegate Sermons: Duties of Masters and Servants".

Janeway's influence on Puritan thought lasted long after his death. Charles Haddon Spurgeon referred to Janeway's works in his sermons on many occasions in the late 1800s.

== Published works ==
- Heaven upon Earth; or the Best Friend in the Worst Times, 1670
- A Token for Children; In two parts, 1671
- Death Unstung; a Funeral Sermon for Thomas Mousley, an Apothecary
- Invisible Realities, demonstrated in the holy Life and Death of Mr. John Janeway, 1673.
- The Saints' Encouragement to Diligence in Christ's Service, 1673
- Legacy to his Friends; containing 27 famous Instances of God's providence in and about sea dangers and deliverances, 1674
- Saints' Memorials, 1674, edited by Edmund Calamy, Joseph Caryl and Ralph Venning
- The Duties of Masters and Servants; a Sermon in supplement to Morning Exercises, 1674
- Man's last End; a Funeral Sermon on Ps. lxxxiv. 8, 1675
- The Murderer punished and pardoned; with the Life and Death of T. Savage
