= Evelyn Shaw =

American ethologist and writer (1927–2003)

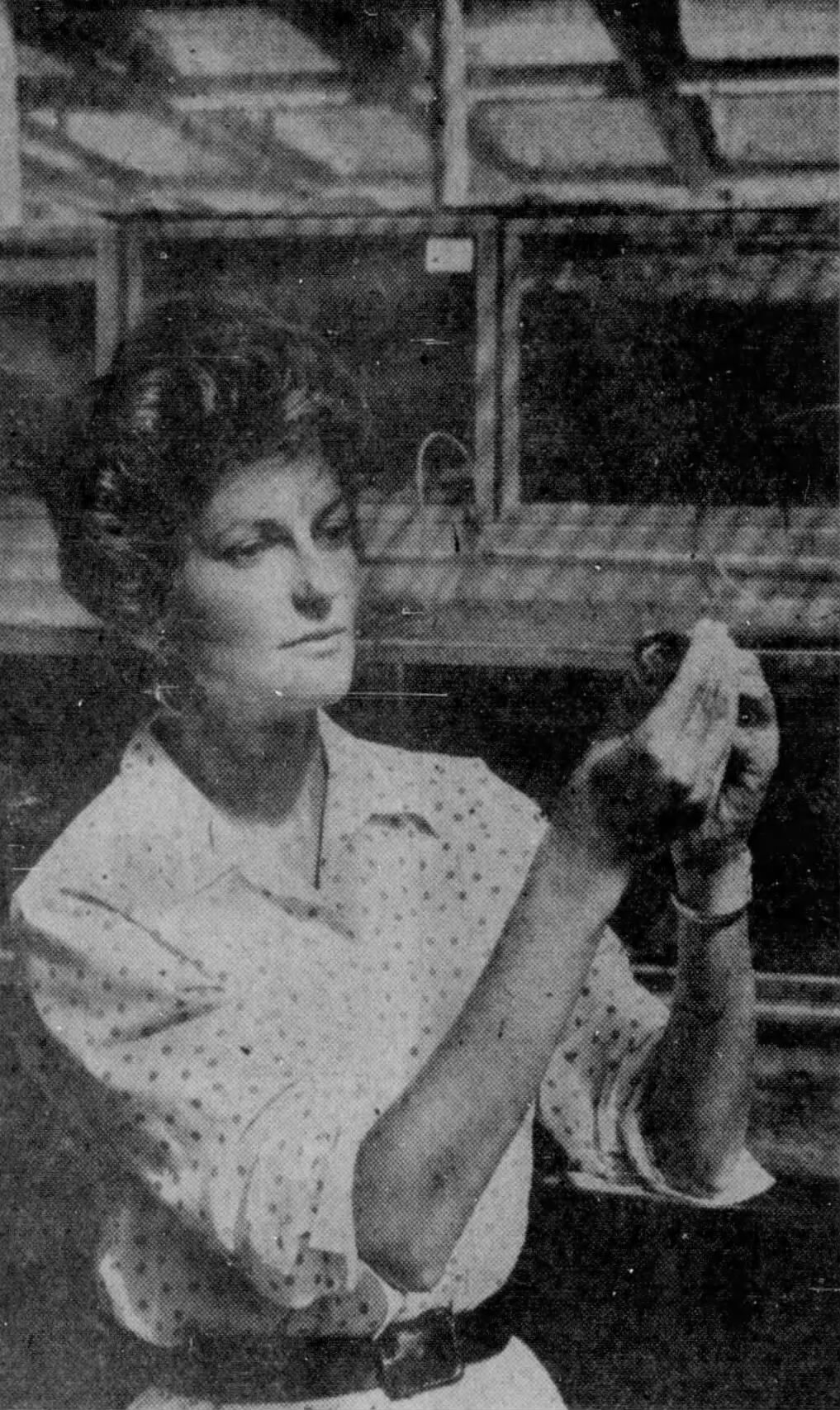
- Shaw in 1959
- Born: Evelyn Steinberg; January 19, 1927; Jersey City, New Jersey, U.S.
- Died: May 19, 2003 (aged 76); San Francisco, California, U.S.
- Occupations: Ethologist; children's writer; caterer
- Spouse: James Shaw (m. 1949, divorced) Frederick Wertheim (m. 1970)
- Awards: Guggenheim Fellowship (1963)

Academic background
- Education: New York University

Academic work
- Discipline: Ethology
- Institutions: American Museum of Natural History; Rutgers University; Stanford University

Evelyn Shaw-Wertheim (née Steinberg; January 19, 1927 – May 19, 2003) was an American ethologist, children's writer, and caterer. A 1963 Guggenheim Fellow, she wrote several books on ethology, some of which were aimed at children. She worked as a curator at the American Museum of Natural History and was a professor at Stanford University.

== Biography ==
Shaw was born on January 19, 1927, in Jersey City, New Jersey; her parents were immigrants from Poland. She studied at New York University, where she obtained her BA in 1947 and MS at 1948. She joined Rutgers University as an assistant biologist in 1947, before being promoted to assistant instructor in biology (1951–1953) and to instructor (1953–1954). She obtained her PhD from NYU in 1952. She was a 1955–1957 United States Public Health Service postdoctoral fellow.

After serving as a guest investigator (1952–1955), she formally joined the American Museum of Natural History (AMNH) as a research associate in 1957, before being promoted to associate curator in 1963. She also directed the museum's undergraduate research program. Serving in the Department of Animal Behavior, her curator work included the Hall of Man.

In addition to the AMNH, she served as a lecturer at Rutgers in 1956, before serving as an adjunct assistant professor of vertebrate zoology for a few months at Columbia University in 1960. She later moved to Stanford University, where she worked as a biology professor. She once worked at the Exploratorium as a consultant for Frank Oppenheimer.

As a biologist, Shaw studied fish ethology, with her field research taking place throughout places like Italy and the Bahamas, as well as at the Scripps Institution of Oceanography. She and Joan Darling, a close associate at Stanford, co-authored a book on female ethology titled Female Strategies, and she co-edited Advances in the Study of Behavior. She also wrote several children's books on ethology, including Elephant Seal Island, Fish Out of School, and A Nest of Wood Ducks. In 1963, she was awarded a Guggenheim Fellowship "for a study of the phenomenon of schooling in fishes". She also received a USPHS Research Career Development Award that same year.

Originally married to James Shaw from 1949 until their divorce in 1959 or 1960, Shaw's second marriage was to Frederick Wertheim, lasting from 1970 until her death. Originally a resident of New York City in 1959, she had lived in San Francisco since 1970. She and Wertheim worked in the catering business, with the latter running the Fred Wertheim Experience, which once appeared on John Loring's The Tiffany Wedding.

Shaw had three children. Delgado noted that "as one of only a handful of women in the field of biology in the 1950s", her work–life balance involved raising a family. She also did part-time work while attending NYU.

Shaw died on May 19, 2003, at her San Francisco home, aged 76, following her battle with cancer. Her archives are located at the University of Minnesota's Children's Literature Research Collection.
