= Peggy Parish =

American writer

- Born: Margaret Cecile Parish; July 14, 1927; Manning, South Carolina, U.S.
- Died: November 19, 1988 (aged 61); Manning, South Carolina, U.S.
- Education: University of South Carolina
- Occupation: Writer

Margaret Cecile "Peggy" Parish (July 14, 1927 – November 19, 1988) was an American writer known best for the children's book series and fictional character Amelia Bedelia. Parish was born in Manning, South Carolina, attended the University of South Carolina, and received a Bachelor of Arts degree in English. She worked as a teacher in both English and creative dancing in Oklahoma, Kentucky, and in New York. She taught at the Dalton School in Manhattan for 15 years and published her first children's book while teaching third grade there. She authored over 30 books, which had sold 7 million copies at the time of her death.

Parish's most well-known character, Amelia Bedelia, is extremely literal minded and interprets idioms and other verbal expressions literally, which amusingly causes great havoc in each story. This idea originated in conversations between Parish and Greenwillow Books founder Susan Hirschman about the author's observations of her third grade students. Amelia works as a household cook and occasional servant, jobs that Parish did in her home when she was young. She uses no recipes, but, by intuitively combining a little bit of this and a little bit of that, her cakes and cookies and meals are always delicious. She is such a good cook that her employers cannot fire her, despite the disastrous way she misinterprets their instructions: prune the shrubs, scale and ice the fish, file the letters, run over the tablecloth with an iron, shorten these dresses, serve coffee with porridge, heat a can of soup, and so on. The author's word-play, and Amelia Bedelia's fundamental goodness and childlike simplicity appeal to youngsters who are beginning to see and enjoy more than one meaning in a word or a phrase.

Parish returned to Manning, South Carolina in 1972 and continued to write children's books there until she died in 1988. After returning to her hometown, Parish began to work as a children's book reviewer for the television show "Carolina Today" in Columbia. Additionally, she taught elementary school students creative writing techniques, and worked in teacher workshops.

During her career, Parish won many awards. In 1977 alone Parish was awarded the Palmetto State Award, a Garden State's Children's Book Award, and a School Library Journal award for Dinosaur Time.

Parish's nephew, Herman, honored Peggy's life in his book, Good Driving, Amelia Bedelia, by writing in its dedication: "For Peggy Parish, the real Amelia." Recalling Parish's method while working on Too Many Rabbits, Herman described how she wrote out her ideas on index cards, "and she’d deal out those cards like she was playing solitaire, and then pick them up, retype them, and rewrite everything many times. That was how she worked, and it gave me a lot of respect for her method."

== Selected works ==
- Littlest Raccoon (1961), illustrated by Claude Humbert
- Let's Be Indians (1962), illus. Arnold Lobel
- My Little Golden Book of Manners (1962), illus. Richard Scarry
- Good Hunting Little Indian (1963), illus. Leonard Weisgard
  Re-released and revised in 1991 as Good Hunting, Blue Sky with illustrations by James Watts.
- Willy Is My Brother (1963), illus. Shirley Hughes
- The Golden Calendar: 1966 (1966), illus. Tibor Gergely
- Let's Be Early Settlers with Daniel Boone (1967), illus. Arnold Lobel
- Ootah's Lucky Day (1970), illus. Mamoru Funai
- Dinosaur Time (1974), illus. Arnold Lobel
- No More Monsters For Me! (1981), illus. Marc Simont
- I Can -- Can You? (1984), 4 volumes, illustrated by Marylin Hafner
- Scruffy (1988), illus. Kelly Oechsli

=== Amelia Bedelia ===
Illustrated by Wallace Tripp, Fritz Siebel, Lynne Avril, Barbara Siebel Thomas or Lynn Sweat:

- Amelia Bedelia (1963) (Big Bright and Early Board Books)
- Thank You, Amelia Bedelia (1964)
- Amelia Bedelia and the Surprise Shower (1966)
- Come Back, Amelia Bedelia (1971)
- Play Ball, Amelia Bedelia (1972)
- Good Work, Amelia Bedelia (1976)
- Teach Us, Amelia Bedelia (1977)
- Amelia Bedelia Helps Out (1979)
- Amelia Bedelia and the Baby (1981)
- Amelia Bedelia Goes Camping (1985)
- Merry Christmas, Amelia Bedelia (1986)
- Amelia Bedelia's Family Album (1988)

=== Liza, Bill & Jed mysteries ===
- Key to the Treasure (1966)
- Clues in the Woods (1968)
- The Haunted House (1971)
- Pirate Island Adventure (1975)
- The Mystery of Hermit Dan (1977)
- The Ghosts of Cougar Island (1986)
