= Susan Hirschman =

American children's book publisher

Susan Hirschman is the founder of children's publisher Greenwillow Books.

== Career ==
Hirschman was born in Manhattan and lived there for her entire career. She was inspired to enter the field of publishing during high school when she heard a talk by Jennie Lindquist. Her first job was in 1954, working as a secretary at publisher Alfred A. Knopf. She later moved to Sandpiper Press, and from there to Harper & Row, where she worked under Ursula Nordstrom. After taking time off from Harper & Row, she was quickly hired by Macmillan to head their children's book publishing division. She remained there until October 1974, when she resigned in protest of a mass firing. She founded Greenwillow as an imprint of William Morrow (now HarperCollins), where she remained until her retirement in 2001.

== Works published ==
During Hirschman's career, she was responsible for the US publication of Watership Down, as well as works by children's authors Kevin Henkes and Jack Prelutsky.
