= Fritz Siebel =

American illustrator (1913–1991)

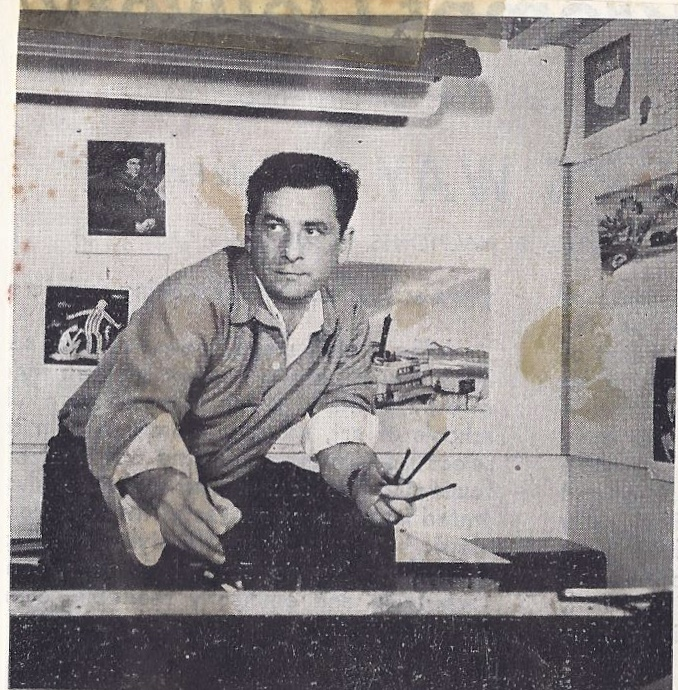
- Siebel in 1941
- Born: Frederick Siebel; December 19, 1913; Vienna, Austria-Hungary
- Died: December 27, 1991 (aged 78); New York City, United States
- Known for: illustration, design

Frederick "Fritz" Siebel (December 19, 1913 – December 27, 1991) was an Austrian American illustrator, well known for his award winning World War II poster "Someone Talked" and his illustrations for the children's book Amelia Bedelia by Peggy Parish.

== Life ==
=== Early years ===
Siebel was born as Friedrich Siebel in Vienna to Czechoslovak parents. During his childhood he and his siblings spent summers at the family hops farm in Czechoslovakia. He studied Illustration and stage design at the Kunstgewerbeschule Vienna (now the University of Applied Arts Vienna), after which, because of his dual citizenship, he was drafted to the Czech army where he served from 1934 to 1936.

=== Immigration to the United States ===
In 1936 Siebel immigrated to the United States and was joined by his family in 1937, and they settled in New York City. The other relatives who remained in Europe perished in the Holocaust.

=== Death ===
Frederick Siebel died in New York City on December 27, 1991. Siebel's first marriage ended in divorce; he was survived by his second wife, seven children, 10 grandchildren and 2 great-grandchildren.

== Work as a graphic artist ==
=== Early United States years ===
In New York City, after his immigration, Siebel made a living illustrating posters and other advertising material for the Paramount Pictures movie studio. He also worked as a demonstrator of Austrian skiing techniques at Saks Fifth Avenue.

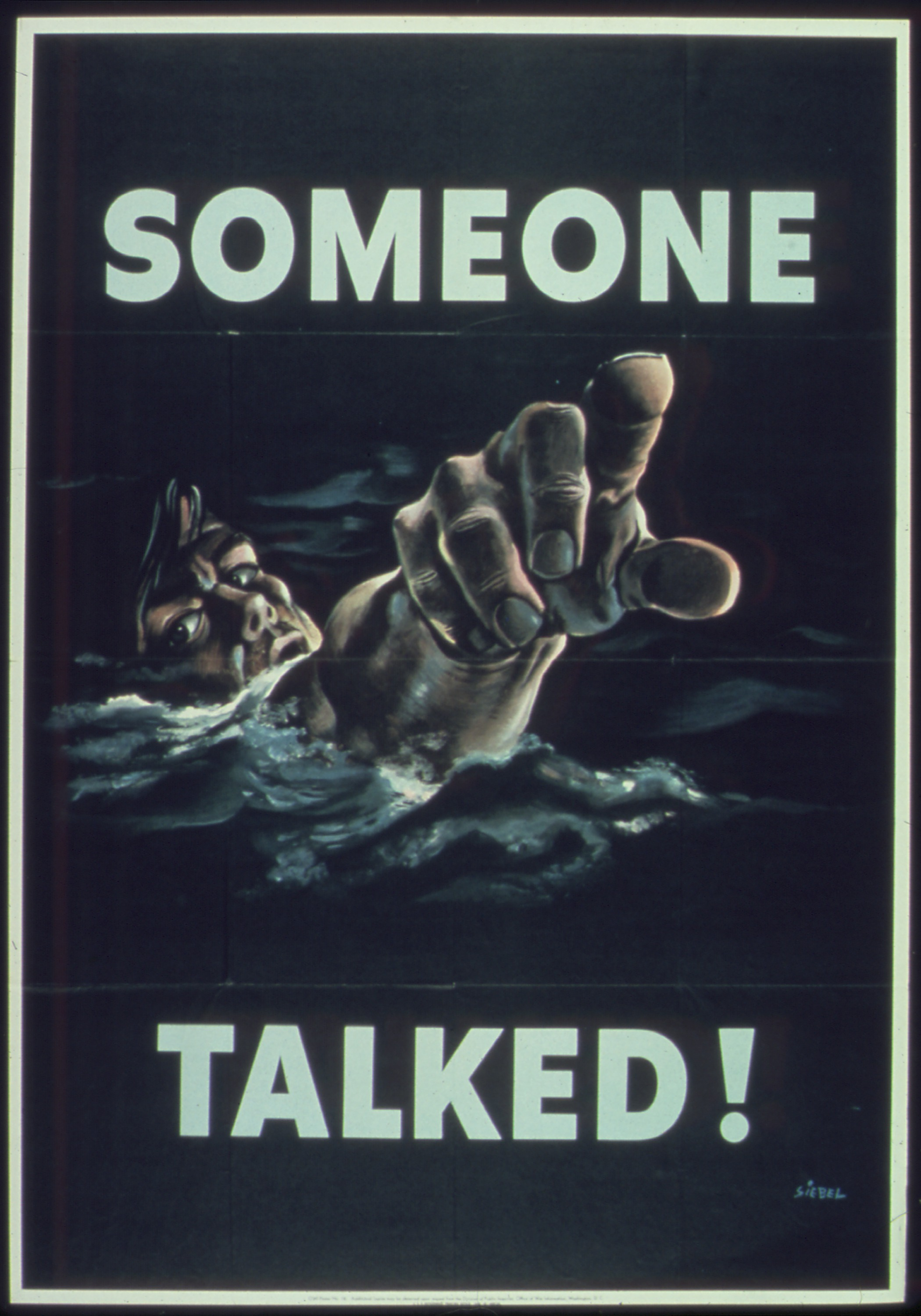

=== World War II and the "Someone Talked" poster ===
During World War II Siebel served in the United States Army between 1941 and 1943.

Before the war, in 1938, he submitted a poster to a national competition for posters on the subject of national security for which First Lady Eleanor Roosevelt was a judge. His entry, "Someone Talked", won several awards and was only published in 1942, during the war. The poster was chosen by David Mamet as an "ominous World War II propaganda poster" on the wall in the workplace in his 1997 neo-noir movie "The Spanish Prisoner".

=== Advertising and magazines ===
Following his work at Paramount Pictures and the success of "Someone Talked", there was a growing demand for Siebel's work, and he began creating illustrations for advertisements and for magazines, working among others with Collier's Magazine, Holiday Magazine and The Saturday Evening Post. Among others, he created ads for Ballantine Beer and Schlitz beer.

=== Mr. Clean ===
In 1957, Siebel was contracted by the Tatum-Laird advertising agency to create a mascot figure for the new Procter & Gamble cleaning product "Mr. Clean". The result was the now world-wide familiar smiling bald man with an earring in his left ear, dubbed "Master Proper" in German-speaking countries, "Mastro Lindo" in Italy, "Monsieur Propre" in France, "Don Limpio" in Spain and "Pan Proper" in Poland. As part of the deal, he gave up all rights to this creation and thus was not credited for it, the copyright attributed solely to Procter & Gamble.

=== Children's book illustration ===
In 1958, Siebel began illustrating children's books. The first two, best-seller "A Fly Went By" and "Stop that Ball!" were written by Mike McClintock and were published in the Random House "Beginner Books" series that was co-founded by Phyllis Cerf with Dr. Seuss, and Seuss' wife Helen Palmer Geisel. In 1962 he illustrated Dorothy Kunhardt's "Dr. Dick". This book was published by Harper and Row (now HarperCollins), who also published his most well known children's book – Amelia Bedelia by Peggy Parish.

From 1993 to 1996, Siebel's daughter, Barbara Siebel Thomas, worked on newly illustrated editions of Thank You, Amelia Bedelia and Amelia Bedelia and the Surprise Shower, as well as the Spanish translation of Amelia Bedelia, all based on her father’s original drawings.

=== Design company ===
In the 1960s Siebel founded the Frederick Siebel Associates company, to provide "creative design for integrated programs of packaging, store display, and other sales-related materials." The company was later renamed "Siebel Marketing Company", and in 1998 was merged with the Chicago marketing agency Upshot under Halo Industries.
