= Richard Cuffari =

American illustrator

- Born: March 2, 1925; Brooklyn, New York, U.S.
- Died: 1978 (aged 52–53)
- Known for: Illustration
- Spouse: Phyllis Klie (m. 1950)
- Awards: New York Society of Children's Illustrators Citation of Merit, 1969 & 1970; Christopher Award, 1973

Richard Cuffari (March 2, 1925 – 1978) was an American artist. He is known for his illustrations for children's books and science fiction books. Specializing in historical and nonfiction topics, Cuffari illustrated over 200 books.

== Biography ==
Cuffari's dust jacket for the original hardback edition of A Wind in the Door by Madeleine L'Engle (1973).

Cuffari was born to immigrant parents in Brooklyn, New York. He attended James Madison High School, winning awards there for his artwork.

During World War II, Cuffari served in the U.S. Army. He graduated from the Pratt Institute in 1949.

He embarked on a freelance career as an illustrator in 1966.

== Bibliography (selected) ==
- The Wind in the Willows (Grosset & Dunlap, 1966), by Kenneth Grahame
- Nothing is Impossible: The Story of Beatrix Potter (Atheneum, 1969), by Dorothy Aldis
- Old Ben (1970), by Jesse Stuart — selected for the 1970 Lewis Carroll Shelf Award
- The Far Side of Evil (1971), by Sylvia Engdahl
- Eight Stories: The Year of the Three‐Legged Deer (Houghton Mifflin, 1972), by Eth Clifford
- This Star Shall Abide (1972), by Sylvia Engdahl
- Beyond the Tomorrow Mountains (1973), by Sylvia Engdahl
- The Capricorn Bracelet (1973), by Rosemary Sutcliff
- A Wind in the Door (Farrar, Straus & Giroux, 1973), by Madeleine L'Engle
- The Perilous Gard (Houghton Mifflin Harcourt, 1974), by Elizabeth Marie Pope
- Planet-Girded Suns: Man's View of Other Solar Systems (1974), by Sylvia Engdahl
- Ring Out! A Book of Bells (1974), by Jane Yolen
- The Mightiest of Mortals: Hercules (Viking Press, 1975), by Doris Gates
- Universe Ahead: Stories of the Future (1975) — anthology of stories selected and introduced by Sylvia Engdahl and Rick Roberson
- Dragons in the Waters (Farrar, Straus and Giroux, 1976), by Madeleine L'Engle
- The Cartoonist (Viking Books for Young Readers, 1978), by Betsy Byars
- Family Secrets: Five Very Important Stories (1979), by Susan Shreve
