= Yarrow poems (Wordsworth) =

Series of poems by William Wordsworth

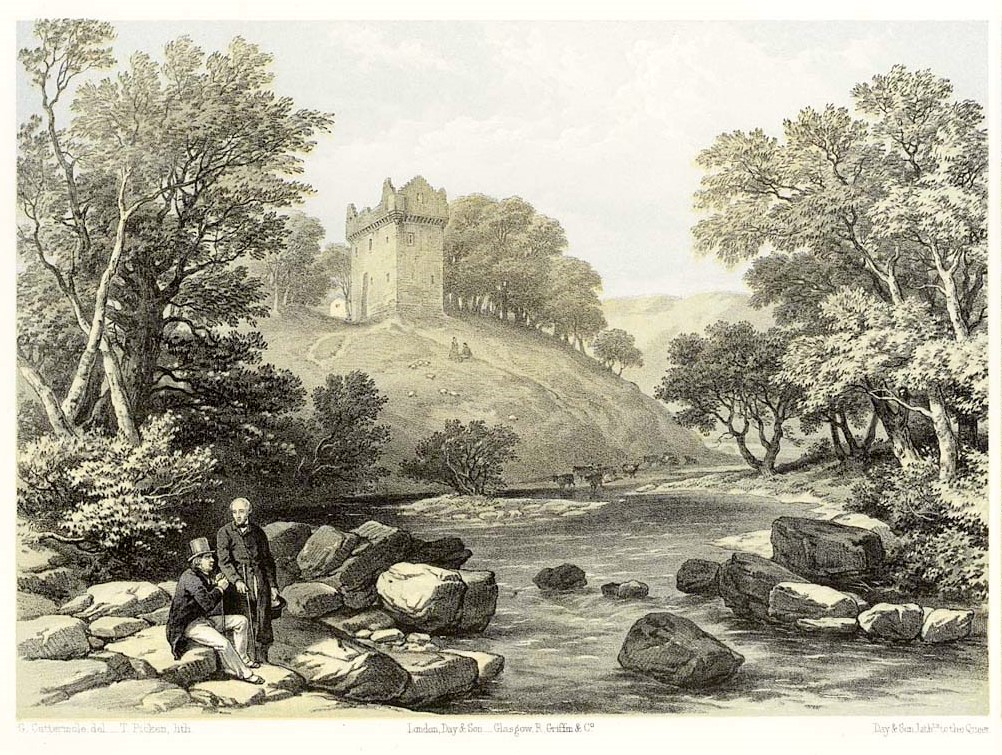
Walter Scott (seated) and William Wordsworth on the Yarrow Water near Newark Castle, Selkirkshire in 1831, portrayed in an 1849 lithograph by Thomas Ashburton Picken of a drawing by George Cattermole.

The Yarrow poems are a series of three poems composed by the English Romantic poet William Wordsworth comprising "Yarrow Unvisited" (1803), "Yarrow Visited" (1814) and "Yarrow Revisited" (1831). "Yarrow Unvisited" presents a justification for his failure to take a detour to see the Yarrow Water, a river much celebrated in earlier Scottish verse, during a tour of Scotland with his sister Dorothy; this, according to the poem, allowed him to retain his imagined idea of the river rather than be disappointed by the reality. It was partly written for his friend Walter Scott, whose friendship with him began during this same tour. The second poem records his impressions on finally seeing the Yarrow in company with the poet James Hogg. The third, a tribute to his friend Walter Scott, was inspired by the poets' last visit to the Yarrow the year before Scott's death. All three draw on the rich heritage of earlier poems and ballads set in the Yarrow Valley. "Yarrow Unvisited" is one of Wordsworth's most famous short poems, and has been judged one of his finest. Modern critical evaluation of the two later works has been more mixed.

== "Yarrow Unvisited" ==
=== Summary ===
The narrator tells how, touring Scotland, his "winsome marrow" proposes to him at Clovenfords that

Whate'er betide, we'll turn aside,
And see the Braes of Yarrow.

But he decides to leave Yarrow to its inhabitants; instead they should follow the River Tweed to Gala Water, Leader Haughs, Dryburgh and on to Teviotdale. The Yarrow has nothing more to offer them than a thousand other streams. His companion is surprised at these words, but he explains that, beautiful though it may be, he prefers to move on, since it is

Enough if in our hearts we know
There's such a place as Yarrow.

Let Yarrow remain unseen since even that beautiful valley cannot match their dreams of it. As they grow older their cares will be lightened by the knowledge

That earth has something yet to show,
The bonny holms of Yarrow!

=== Composition ===
In August 1803 William Wordsworth and his sister Dorothy set out on a tour of Scotland, initially with their friend Samuel Taylor Coleridge, though they left him behind after two weeks. On 18 September, in the return half of their journey, they walked from Peebles to Clovenfords, deciding to avoid the Yarrow not for the reasons stated in the poem but simply because they were short of time. They had at this point just met for the first time, and formed what was to be a lifelong friendship with, Walter Scott, at that time best known as the editor of the ballad-collection Minstrelsy of the Scottish Border. They were impressed by the depth of his love for the Border country and everything that pertained to it. They returned home to Grasmere on 25 September. Wordsworth wrote "Yarrow Unvisited" at some point in the next few months, probably in November 1803, using for it the metre of a ballad called "Leader Haughs and Yarrow". His headnote for the poem directed the reader's attention to "the various Poems the Scene of which is laid upon the Banks of the Yarrow; in particular, the exquisite Ballad of Hamilton" called "The Braes of Yarrow". Among these poems is a ballad by John Logan, also called "The Braes of Yarrow" and known to be much admired by Wordsworth; likewise the anonymous "The Dowie Dens o Yarrow", "The Lament of the Border Widow", "Rare Willy Drowned in Yarrow", "The Rose of Yarrow", "Mary Scott, the Flower of Yarrow", Burns's "Braw Lads" and other poems, together constituting a long tradition to which Wordsworth's poem responds. Its theme is his belief, confirmed by his travels of the previous few years, in the superiority of unvisited scenes to visited ones as a spur to the imagination; as R. H. Hutton wrote, "He hoarded his joys and lived upon the interest which they paid in the form of hope and expectation." But the poem's scenery was determined by his wish to draw a picture of all the aspects of the Border Scott loved, for it was written, Wordsworth told his new friend, "not without a view of pleasing you".

=== Reception ===
When published in Wordsworth's Poems, in Two Volumes in 1807, "Yarrow Unvisited" took its share of the critical scorn directed at that collection by the reviewers. The Edinburgh Review called it "a very tedious and affected performance", while Le Beau Monde, or, Literary and Fashionable Magazine said that Wordsworth "had long protracted [it] for the pleasure of concluding it with a nothing". Even his friend Charles Lamb later told him that it had only one or two exquisite stanzas in it, namely the penultimate one or the last two. In 1819 William Maginn wrote a parody of it called "Don Juan Unread". By 1833, Scott's son-in-law, J. G. Lockhart, could call it one of Wordsworth's most exquisite works, and on the poet's death in 1850 his obituarist in The Athenaeum named it, along with about twenty sonnets and four longer poems, as one of the works by which he would be remembered. The later 19th-century critic John Campbell Shairp judged that "if it contains only two stanzas [lines 49–56] pitched in Wordsworth's highest strain, [it] is throughout in his most felicitous diction. The manner is that of the old ballad, with an infusion of modern reflection, which yet does not spoil its naturalness." Among modern critics, Hugh Sykes Davies considered that "the poem has slender merits"; but for Russell Hayes it was "a delightful piece of Border minstrelsy". F. B. Pinion thought it "a remarkable achievement, light and engaging throughout", and Mary Moorman rated it as one of Wordsworth's best poems.

"Yarrow Unvisited" has had a perceptible influence on 20th-century literature. Poems which have alluded to it and re-examined its themes include Stevie Smith's "The Occasional Yarrow", Norman Nicholson's "Askam Unvisited", and Paul Muldoon's Yarrow. Hugh Kingsmill and Hesketh Pearson, the authors of Skye High: The Record of a Tour Through Scotland in the Wake of Samuel Johnson and James Boswell (1937), coined the term yarrowing to describe their practice of leaving unvisited those Scottish locations which, having been passed through by Johnson and Boswell, had originally figured in their own planned itinerary.

== "Yarrow Visited" ==
=== Summary ===
The poet is saddened to see Yarrow different from how he had imagined it. He describes its appearance in the early morning and admits that it has many beauties. He remembers the tale of "the famous flower/Of Yarrow", wonders where its scenes took place and finds the landscape worthy of the story. He notes the ruins of Newark Castle, and praises the "fair scenes", suitable for every stage of human life. He proposes to place a heather wreath on his true-love's head, or on his own. He can now see Yarrow both through imagination and through experience, and though he has to leave it the memory of seeing it will be a happy one.

=== Composition ===
From July to September 1814 Wordsworth was again on tour in Scotland, accompanied by his wife Mary and her sister, Sara Hutchinson. On 1 September they started from Traquair and, along with the poet James Hogg and (initially) Robert Anderson, editor of The Works of the British Poets, walked first to St Mary's Loch and then along the course of the Yarrow. The following day the Wordsworths visited Abbotsford, Scott's home, where they were entertained by Scott's wife, though the writer himself was not there. He began to write "Yarrow Visited" either on the day of the walk itself or on the Abbotsford day, completing it, more or less, within the next fortnight. He then gave a copy to Hogg to include in an anthology of works by living poets, but this book was never published and the version of the poem Wordsworth gave him is now lost. He radically revised it, probably in late September or early October, admitting to a friend that it was "heavier than my things generally are", and that a "falling off [from "Yarrow Unvisited"] was unavoidable, perhaps, from the subject, as imagination almost always transcends reality." He made further revisions before its eventual publication in his Poems (1815). The resulting work, Stephen Gill has written, "celebrates the actual beauty of the place while recognizing how much its power to move depends on literary associations and the mind's play". Again Wordsworth engages deeply with earlier local poems by Hamilton, Hogg and Robert Burns, and particularly with Logan's "The Braes of Yarrow" and Scott's The Lay of the Last Minstrel, even down to their rhymes and rhythms, making it "more lyric than ballad, more music than narrative, more sound than sense".

=== Reception ===
Charles Lamb found "Yarrow Visited" far superior to its predecessor in that it was more consistent in its excellence, and he wrote of lines 41–48 "no lovelier stanza can be found in the wide world of poetry". Hogg disagreed, giving it as his opinion in 1832 that "Yarrow Visited" was "not so sweet or ingenious a poem...so much is hope superior to enjoyment". Allan Cunningham, in 1825, wrote that the two poems would immortalise any stream. There was favourable criticism in the periodicals, the Monthly Review finding in "Yarrow Visited" a "peculiar softness and beauty", while Tait's Edinburgh Magazine, on Wordsworth's death, wrote that it was not easy to find a more beautiful treatment of the subject of enjoyment of natural beauty triumphing over initial anticipations of disappointment. Later in the century, John Campbell Shairp pronounced a judgement the opposite of Lamb's, "Yarrow Visited" being for him more irregular in quality than "Yarrow Unvisited", "some of [its stanzas] rising to an excellence which Wordsworth has not surpassed, and which has impressed them on the poetic memory as possessions for ever, others sinking down to the level of ordinary poetic workmanship". Modern opinions differ as to the poem's merits. Kenneth R. Johnston considered it no more than "a tepid tribute of scene-painting", but F. B. Pinion wrote that it is "exquisitely expressed throughout", and "one of several poems which show that Wordsworth in his later years was capable of writing in strains rarely surpassed by other English poets".

== "Yarrow Revisited" ==
=== Summary ===
Again, after many years, the poet has looked on the Yarrow at Newark Castle, this time with the "Great Minstrel of the Border". They have spent a happy day in contemplation of the autumnal scene, recalling the happy days of their youth and maturity and contrasting their own changing fate with the unchanging stream. Blessings on the Muse who trains her sons to meet sickness and care! Scott, as you travel to Italy, may your health be restored there and may classical and native Fancy both inspire you as you find new scenes there. For even Nature can mean little without "the poetic voice/That hourly speaks within us". Our memories of local scenes sustain us through the changes of Life. You, who climbed the stairs of Yarrow tower that day can bear witness to this. May the Yarrow flow on, and may future bards sing its praises, so dear now to the poet's memory!

=== Composition ===
In August 1831, suffering from the after-effects of a stroke and hoping to regain his health in Italy, Scott invited Wordsworth to visit him before his departure. Suffering health problems of his own, Wordsworth delayed his departure and only reached Abbotsford, accompanied by his daughter Dora, on 19 September, five days before Scott was due to leave. On 20 September they all took a trip to Newark Castle on the Yarrow which might, Wordsworth realized, be Scott's last. This day's journey was the occasion of two poems by Wordsworth, one a sonnet beginning "A trouble, not of clouds, or weeping rain", and the other "Yarrow Revisited", written a few weeks later in October 1831. The subject of this latter poem is not so much the Yarrow itself as the changing reactions to it of both Wordsworth and Scott through the course of their adult lives; it is the poet's act of homage to his old friend. It was published in his collection, Yarrow Revisited and Other Poems, initially in April 1835, though new editions were needed in 1836 and 1839, this being the first of Wordsworth's books to meet with commercial success. Wordsworth was not finished with the subject of his memories of the Yarrow: he returned to it in passages of his "Extempore Effusions upon the Death of James Hogg" in 1835, and again in "Musings near Aquapendente" in 1837.

=== Reception ===
The title-poem of Yarrow Revisited initially got a good press. In America, it is true, The Christian Examiner and General Review judged that though the language was pure and flowing, "the structure of the verse does not correspond to the grave style of thought. It is altogether too light and dancing." The images it thought sometimes pretty and simple, sometimes too far-fetched. But Fraser's Magazine found the poem "consummately lovely", with an epic dignity to its characters, and the Monthly Repository's reviewer saw it as "a beautiful completion and building up into an entire unity of the author's two former poems...While, as in all Wordsworth's compositions, the power of the scenery is over every verse, the effect is much enhanced by the view afforded us of the mode in which one great poet thought and felt of another." Blackwood's Edinburgh Magazine spoke of the "perfect beauty" of all three Yarrow poems. J. G. Lockhart, Scott's son-in-law, considered that Wordsworth had "connected his name to all time" with the Yarrow in these three poems. Tennyson was, according to his son, "always greatly moved by 'Yarrow Revisited'". John Campbell Shairp agreed with Wordsworth's own view that "There is too much pressure of fact for these verses to harmonise, as much as I could wish, with the two preceding poems", but nevertheless considered it one of the best works in Wordsworth's later manner, inferior only to the finest of the Lyrical Ballads, and valuable also as a record of his friendship with Scott. Alexander Lamont, writing in The Sunday Magazine, acknowledged this biographical interest but found it greatly inferior to the two earlier Yarrow poems in poetic art. There was similar diversity of opinion among 20th-century critics. Scott's biographer Edgar Johnson called it "twaddling moralistic doggerel", though Donald Sultana felt that that did not do this "moving lyric" justice. Mary Moorman, like Shairp, agreed with Wordsworth's own misgivings about the poem, while also being charmed by the picture it presented of two poets finding happiness for a few hours in spite of age and sickness. Kenneth R. Johnston thought it a powerful tribute to the power of poetry, rivalling the first poem in the sequence in a way in which "Yarrow Visited" did not. Stephen Gill flatly contradicted Wordsworth's remarks on "Yarrow Revisited": "It is the pressure of fact against the consolations of fancy which shapes the poet's meditation and makes it so poignant." It is, he wrote, a strong poem which, in its final lines, sums up the Yarrow sequence and "reaffirm[s] the rewards both of art and friendship".
