= Ted CoConis =

American illustrator and painter (1927–2023)

Constantinos "Ted" CoConis
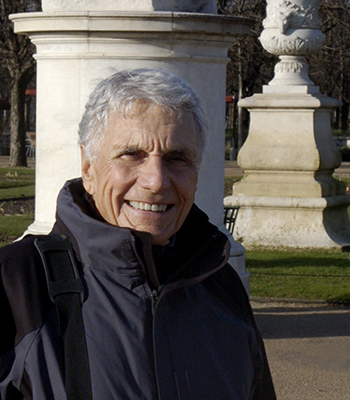
- CoConis in 2011
- Born: August 31, 1927; Chicago, Illinois, U.S.
- Died: March 28, 2023 (aged 95); Cedar Key, Florida, U.S.
- Occupations: Illustrator, painter
- Spouse: Kristen CoConis

Constantinos "Ted" CoConis (August 31, 1927 – March 28, 2023) was an American illustrator and painter who worked on many children's books, including the 1971 Newbery Award-winning The Summer of the Swans by Betsy Cromer Byars, and The Golden God, Apollo by Doris Gates. He is the creator of well-known movie posters, book covers, and magazine and story illustrations, for which he was inducted into the Society of Illustrators' Hall of Fame. In 1980, he left the world of illustration to pursue a career as a fine artist.

== Early life ==
The son of Greek immigrants, CoConis's mother recognized and encouraged her son's artistic talents from an early age. He was awarded a scholarship to the Art Institute of Chicago while still in grade school. In 1942, with the advent of WWII and at the young age of 15, he joined the US Air Force, having altered his baptismal record to do so. After receiving an honorary discharge two years later, he enrolled in Chicago's American Academy of Arts, only to then join the U.S. Merchant Marine a year later.

After returning stateside, an Air Force Colonel with whom CoConis had worked earlier encouraged him to apply for a position in the publicity department of the Fifth Army in Chicago. There, he created magazine covers, brochures, and recruiting posters for the Army. Later in his career, he was commissioned to create the cover illustrations for the handbook that outlined major programs being pursued to equip the army of the 21st century. The US Army and Air Force both commissioned paintings that now hang in the Pentagon.

In the early 1950s, CoConis transferred to the Sixth Army in San Francisco as an illustrator and started doing freelance work. His work attracted the attention of Al Chaite who was associated with a notable commercial art studio in New York City, and CoConis accepted a full-time position with the studio.

== Work as an illustrator ==
While working with Chaite, CoConis became connected with well-known accounts; he built up a reputation within the industry as a talented illustrator for major magazines such as Cosmopolitan, Good Housekeeping and Reader’s Digest as well as for book covers and story illustrations, movie posters, and album covers. Having developed a considerable reputation, by the mid-1960s CoConis was able to establish himself as a freelance artist and work out of his own studio in CT.

CoConis illustrated a number of children's books, including the 1971 Newberry Award-winning The Summer of the Swans by Betsy Cromer Byars and The Golden God: Apollo by Doris Gates. He created the covers for such well-known books as Nelson Algren’s A Walk on the Wild Side (1960), Ada, or Ardor (1969) by Vladimir Nabokov, and William Goldman’s The Princess Bride (1973). CoConis also provided interior illustrations for some of James Michener's novels published in Reader's Digest condensed books, including Texas and Alaska.

During this period CoConis also provided illustrations for film posters, a number of which received Academy Awards, and record album covers for popular and classic performers and orchestras including Della Reese, Doris Day, Itzhak Perlman, Eugene Ormandy, and the Philadelphia Orchestra. Some of the most celebrated/famous/iconic are those listed below. His earlier work with Jim Henson and the Muppet Show (1974), led to CoConis being asked to illustrate the movie poster for Labyrinth (1986). The image was also used on the cover of A.C.H. Smith’s novelization of the movie

=== Posters ===
- Petulia (1968)
- Finian's Rainbow (1968)
- The Prime of Miss Jean Brodie (1969)
- Dorian Gray (1970)
- Fiddler on the Roof (1971)
- Man of La Mancha (1972)
- Lady Caroline Lamb (1972)
- Breezy (1973)
- The Muppet Valentine Show (1974)
- A Matter of Time (1976)
- Joseph Andrews (1977)
- The Other Side of Midnight (1977)
- Cuba (1979)
- Labyrinth (1986)

=== Record album covers ===
- Man of La Mancha Original Motion Picture Soundtrack (1972)
- Weldon Irvine's Sinbad (1976)
- Odyssey (1977)
- Hair (Spanish version) (1979)
- Labyrinth (Original Soundtrack of the Jim Henson film) (1986)
- Year Long Disaster (2007)

== Work as a fine artist ==
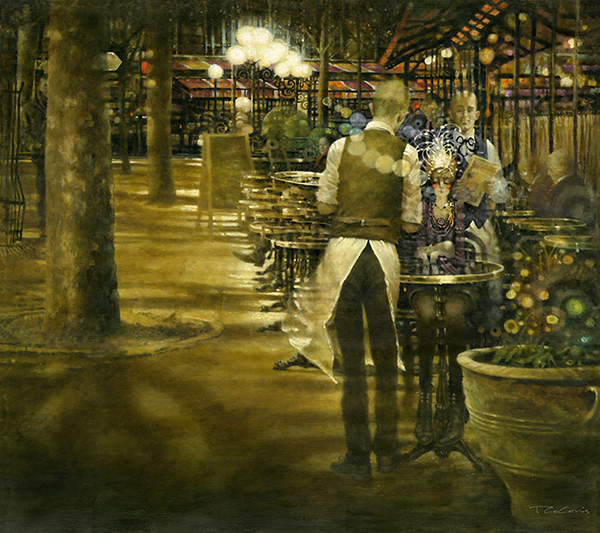
"Une Soirée Enchantée" Painting by Ted CoConis, Private Collection

CoConis began working independently as a fine artist in 1980. He noted in various interviews that he felt it was time to do his own paintings and have control over his creative decisions. Since that time, he and his spouse and creative partner, Kristen, have spent several months each year in France and of late also in Greece, where he produces sketches en plein air. Returning with the drawings to his studio in Cutler, Maine, or Cedar Key, Florida, he meticulously brings the figures to life on his canvas by painstakingly using oils and pastels or creating graphite drawings.

CoConis's extensive Women in Paris and Exotic Ladies of Rue St. Denis series depicts self-possessed, solitary women from different walks of life—courtesans, poets, professors, circus performers, and so forth—content in their solitude. The women are presented in elaborate detail in their real-world settings, such as flower shops, brothels, local cafés, the Louvre or the Tuileries Garden. To quote Tudor, "The power of Women in Paris, as the evolving series of CoConis’s work has come to be known, is the same one that fueled his first illustrations: Every face, every gesture, every choice in clothing and setting tells a story. And within that story, the dignity, discovery, and depth of the human experience is laid bare."

A number of paintings from the Women in Paris series have been reproduced in magazine articles. His painting of La Marchesa Luisa Casati appears in the book, The Marchesa Casati: Portrait of a Muse, as does his poster, A Matter of Time.

His work has won numerous awards from the Society of Illustrators, the Art Directors’ Clubs of New York and Los Angeles, and other associations. His art is in the Museum of Illustration of the Society of Illustrators. and the United States Air Force Art Collection.

Throughout his life, CoConis looked to the School of the Art Institute of Chicago and the scholarship he received in grade school as a touchstone for inspiration: “When I was growing up in Chicago, it was a tough kind of life,” CoConis recalled. “The word ‘scholarship’, and what it represented, goes way beyond what it did at the time. It has become something I look back on to give me fortitude to keep trying.” He noted that he has been striving to learn how to draw and paint for 94 years: “but I never quite achieve what I hope to. That elusive goal always seems to remain slightly beyond my reach.” In another interview, when asked how he would like to be remembered, CoConis noted that he did not want to be that kind of artist. "When a person is alive—now—and they have collectors and people who love their art…. That’s what I want."

== Death ==
CoConis died in Cedar Key, Florida on March 28, 2023, at the age of 95.
