= Solstice Wood =

2006 novel by Patricia A. McKillip

- First edition cover
- Author: Patricia A. McKillip
- Language: English
- Genre: Fantasy
- Publisher: Ace Books
- Publication date: February 7, 2006
- Publication place: United States
- Media type: Print
- Pages: 288
- ISBN: 0-441-01366-X
- Preceded by: Winter Rose

Solstice Wood is a 2006 fantasy novel by American writer Patricia A. McKillip, the sequel to her 1996 novel Winter Rose. It won the 2007 Mythopoeic Fantasy Award for Adult Literature.

== Summary ==
As a bookseller in California, Sylva Lynn has a comfortable life away from her family. But after receiving word that her grandfather has died, she reluctantly returns to New York for the funeral. When the old magic protecting their house from the fay fails, Sylva's cousin is kidnapped and replaced with a changeling. Like her relative Rois Melior, the hero of Winter Rose, it is only Sylva, who is part fairy herself, who is able to cross the border into the other realm to rescue him and return peace to their ancestral home

== Awards ==
- 2007 Mythopoeic Fantasy Award for Adult Literature

== See also ==
- Tam Lin
- Elfland
