= Yarrow Water =

River in Scotland

Coordinates: 55.5531°N 2.9130°W

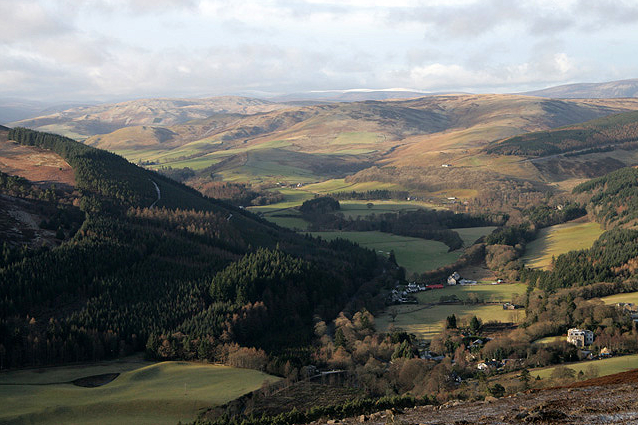
The Yarrow Valley in winter

The Yarrow Water is a river in the Borders in the south east of Scotland. It is a tributary of the Ettrick Water (itself a tributary of the Tweed) and renowned for its high quality trout and salmon fishing. The name "Yarrow" may derive from the Celtic word garw meaning "rough" or possibly share a derivation with the English name "Jarrow".

The valley was the birthplace of Mungo Park and has inspired several well-known songs and poems. Its traditions and folk tales were well documented by Walter Scott, who spent part of his childhood nearby, and in adult life returned to live in the vicinity at Abbotsford House, near Melrose.

== Geography and history ==
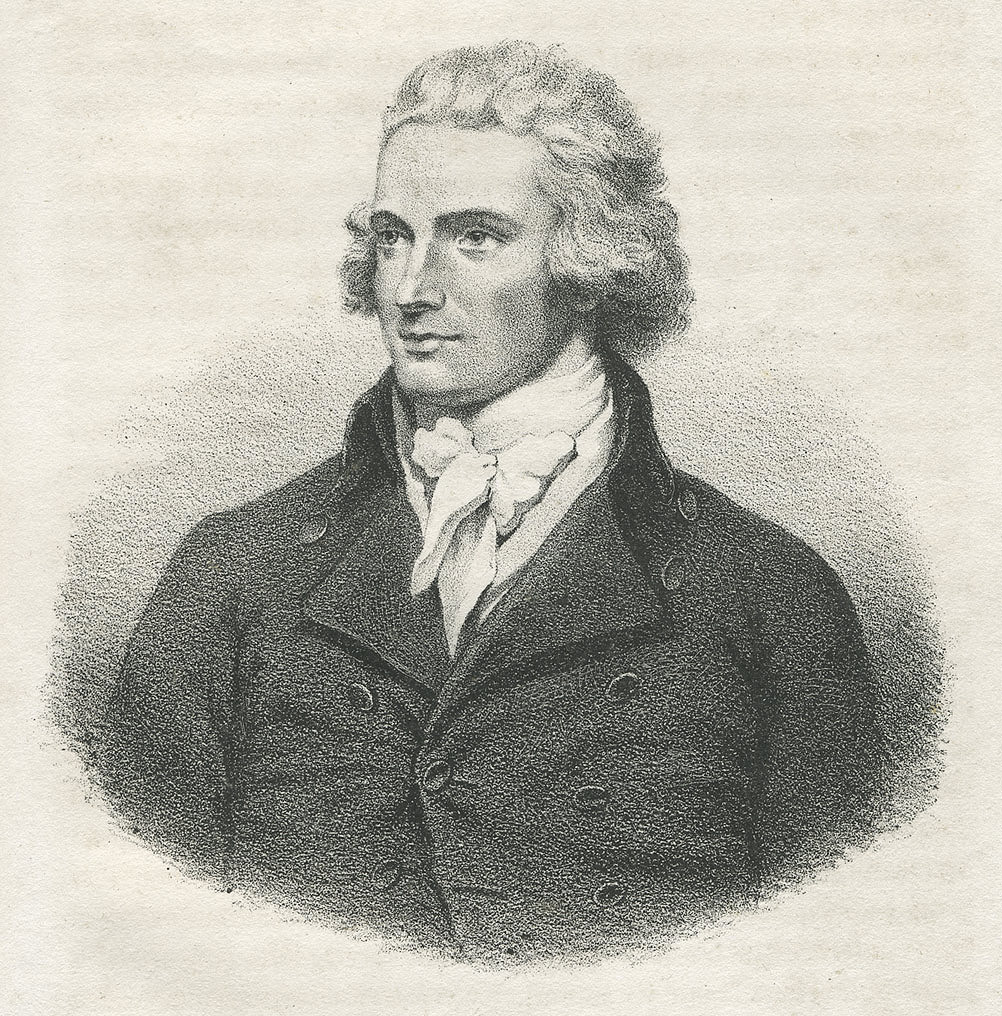
Mungo Park

Its source is St. Mary's Loch and from there the Yarrow Water flows 20 kilometres (12 mi) in an easterly direction with a fall of 123.5 metres (405 ft) passing the settlements of Yarrow Feus, Yarrow and Yarrowford before joining the Ettrick near to the site of the 1645 Battle of Philiphaugh just west of Selkirk. This confluence, which occurs at the eastern edge of the Duke of Buccleuch's Bowhill Estate, is known as the Meetings Pool. The valley is traversed by the A708 that runs from Selkirk to Moffat.

The explorer Mungo Park was born at Foulshiels on the left bank of the river in 1771. In May 1804 Walter Scott came upon Park throwing stones into a deep pool in the river and remarked that "This appears but an idle amusement for one who has seen so much adventure". Park replied that this was "Not so idle perhaps, as you suppose. This was the way I used to ascertain the depth of a river in Africa". Although he had not yet told anyone, Park was considering his second and fateful expedition at the time. At about the same time, James Hogg ("The Ettrick Shepherd") had come to the attention of Scott whilst the former was working at Blackhouse Farm in the Yarrow valley.

The impressive ruins of Newark Castle, held by the Earls of Douglas in the 15th century, lie on the right bank of the river opposite Foulshiels.

== In literature ==
=== The Dowie Dens ===
The folk song "The Dowie Dens o Yarrow" (English: "the dismal, narrow wooded valleys of Yarrow") refers to an ambush and murder that takes place in the locality. According to Walter Scott the song is based on a real incident that took place in the seventeenth century, although some modern scholars are sceptical about this story as one of the origins of the song. These include a poem by William Hamilton of Bangour called "The Braes of Yarrow" first published in Edinburgh in 1724 and said to be "written in imitation of an old Scottish ballad on a similar subject".

=== Outlaw Murray ===
"The Sang of the Outlaw Murray" is a lay that may have been composed in the reign of James V and which was collected by Walter Scott. Local tradition held that the events took place in the vicinity of Newark Castle, although Scott himself believed that the old tower at Hangingshaw, a seat of the Philiphaugh family near Yarrowford, was the correct location. He was assured by "the late excellent antiquarian Mr. Plummer, sheriff-depute of Selkirkshire... that he remembered the insignia of the unicorns, &c. so often mentioned in the ballad, in existence" there.

=== William Wordsworth ===
James Hogg- detail of an oil painting by W. Nicholson

In his 1803 publication "Yarrow Unvisited" William Wordsworth wrote:

"What's Yarrow but a river bare,
That glides the dark hills under?
There are a thousand such elsewhere
As worthy of your wonder."

although this deprecation did not deter a further visit to the area when he journeyed down the length of the Yarrow in the company of James Hogg and the subsequent publication of "Yarrow Visited" in 1814 and "Yarrow Revisited" in 1838.

Wordsworth's 1835 "Extempore Effusion upon the Death of James Hogg" includes the lines:

"The mighty Minstrel breathes no longer,
'Mid mouldering ruins low he lies;
And death upon the braes of Yarrow,
Has closed the Shepherd-poet's eyes."

=== Tam Lin ===
The wood of Carterhaugh near the confluence of the Yarrow and Ettrick, is the setting for the ballad "Tam Lin". This song, collected in 1729, tells the story of a maiden and her relationship to the faery world. It begins:

"O I forbid you, maidens a',
That wear gowd on your hair,
To come or gae by Carterhaugh,
For young Tam Lin is there.

There's nane that gaes by Carterhaugh
But they leave him a wad,
Either their rings, or green mantles,
Or else their maidenhead."

It is possible that this tale is derived from the 13th century ballad, "Thomas the Rhymer", that concerns Thomas Learmonth of nearby Erceldoune.

J. B. Selkirk

The local Scottish poet and essayist J. B. Selkirk wrote extensively about Yarrow Water; for example, A Song of Yarrow, Love in Yarrow, Looking Back in Yarrow, An Appeal from Yarrow, Retreat in Yarrow, Parted in Yarrow, and Death in Yarrow.

== Folk tales ==
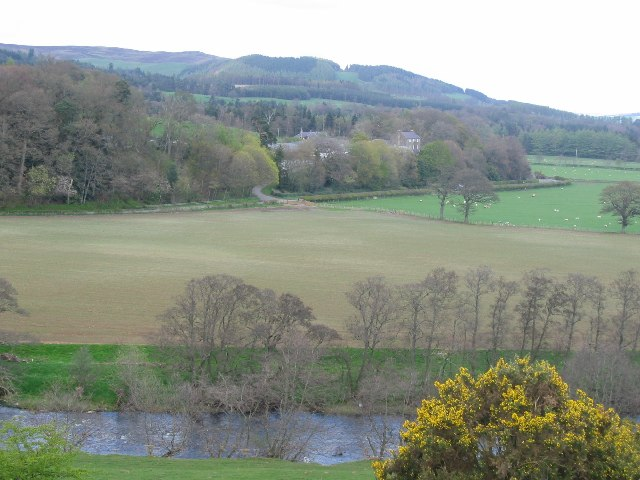
Carterhaugh with Harehead Hill (centre) and Foulshiels Hill (at left) beyond.

The subject matter of Tam Lin is referred to in various other local traditions. Scott recorded that:

The peasants point out upon the plain [of Caterhaugh], those electrical rings which vulgar credulity supposes to be traces of the Fairy revels. Here, they say, were placed the stands of milk, and of water, in which Tamlane was dipped in order to effect the disenchantment; and upon these spots, according to their mode of expressing themselves, the grass will never grow.

He went on to complain that "in no part of Scotland, indeed, has the belief in Fairies maintained its ground with more pertinacity than in Selkirkshire" and describes a story "implicitly believed by all" said to have occurred in the seventeenth century on Peat Law, to the east of Foulshiels Hill:

The victim of elfin sport was a poor man, who, being employed in pulling heather upon Peatlaw, a hill not far from Carterhaugh, had tired of his labour and laid him down to sleep upon a Fairy ring. When he awakened he was amazed to find himself in the midst of a populous city, to which, as well as to the means of his transportation, he was an utter stranger. His coat was left upon the Peatlaw; and his bonnet, which had fallen off in the course of his aerial journey, was afterwards found hanging upon the steeple of the church of Lanark.

== See also ==
- Yarrowford
- List of places in the Scottish Borders
- List of places in Scotland
