= Carterhaugh =

Wood and farm in Scottish Borders, Scotland

Coordinates: 55.531°N 2.892°W

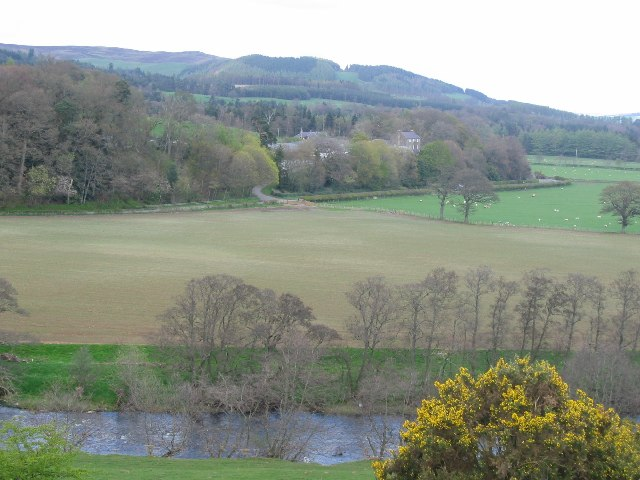
Carterhaugh with the Ettrick Water in the foreground

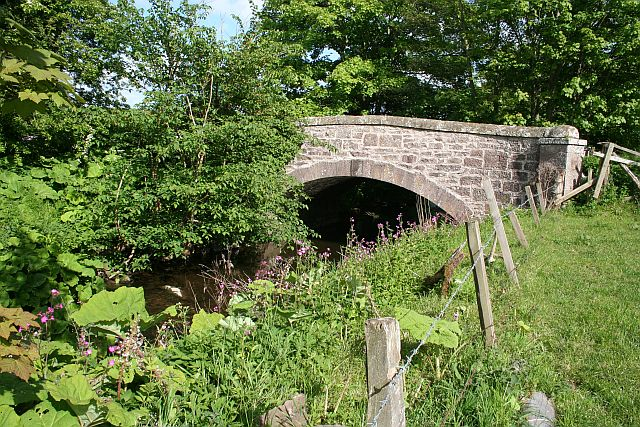
Carterhaugh Bridge crossing Ettrick Water

Carterhaugh /ˌkɑːrtərˈhɔː/ is a wood and farm near the confluence of the Yarrow Water and the Ettrick Water near Selkirk in the Scottish Borders. This real location shares its name with the fictional setting for the meeting between Tam Lin and Janet (sometimes Margaret) in the ballad "Tam Lin". This is commemorated in the name of Tamlane's Well, on the roadside outside Carterhaugh Farm. The link between the location and the ballad is debated.

It is close to the site of the Battle of Philiphaugh (1645) on Ettrick Water and to the birthplace of Mungo Park on Yarrow Water. Carterhaugh Bridge is a listed building, reference number 13866, listed as Caterhaugh.
