= Summer of the Swans =

1970 novel by Betsy Byars

- Early edition cover
- Author: Betsy Byars
- Illustrator: Ted CoConis
- Language: English
- Genre: Young adult novel
- Publisher: Viking Press
- Publication date: 1970
- Publication place: United States
- Media type: Print (Hardback & Paperback)
- ISBN: 0-14-031420-2
- OCLC: 7176007
- Dewey Decimal: Fic 19
- LC Class: PZ7.B98396 Su 1981

Summer of the Swans is a children's novel by Betsy Byars about fourteen-year-old Sara Godfrey's search for her missing, mentally challenged brother Charlie. It won the Newbery Medal in 1971.

Summer of the Swans was adapted for television as Sara's Summer of the Swans in 1974.

== Characters ==
Sara Godfrey: the protagonist, who is convinced that her fourteenth summer is "the worst summer of her life." She and her two siblings have been living with their Aunt Willie ever since their mother died six years before. (Their father works in Ohio and visits on occasional weekends.) Sara is portrayed as a very superficial girl, obsessed with the way things (especially her body) look, and constantly frets about her feet, which she believes are too large. She seems to hold grudges easily; for example, her grudge against Joe Melby, a boy whom she once had a conflict with at school. Sara is the closest in her family to her younger brother, Charlie. She is very annoyed with him and sometimes resorts to bullying him, and she resents her sister Wanda's beauty.

Charlie Godfrey: Sara's 10-year-old brother. He is intellectually disabled since his brain was ravaged by a high fever at the age of three. He cannot speak but can make noises. (He is able to speak in the TV special version.) He can understand all that is said to him and can nod or shake his head in response. Although 10 years old, he cannot draw and writes certain letters backward. He enjoys listening to the ticking of the watch he always wears, although he cannot tell time. He loves watching the swans in the lake near their house; this eventually leads to his disappearance. Of all the members of his family, he appears closest to Sara.

Wanda Godfrey: Sara's 19-year-old sister. Sara is very jealous of her, as she believes Wanda is beautiful, though it is Aunt Willie's opinion that they look exactly alike. Wanda works at the local hospital and has a boyfriend named Frank. She is generally exasperated by Sara's constant self-criticism.

Willamina "Aunt Willie" Godfrey: Sara's aunt, her father's sister, who has been looking after her nieces and nephew since the death of their mother six years previously. Aunt Willie seldom listens to what the children have to say and is extremely stubborn. It is implied that her age is somewhere over 40.

Joe Melby: a boy around Sara's age who attends the same school she does. Sara has hated him ever since an incident where Charlie's watch went missing, and she believed Joe had taken it. Eventually, she discovers she was wrong and forgives him. Joe helps Sara find Charlie, and at the end of the novel, he invites her to a party.

Mary Weicek: Sara's best friend, who helps her out with everything possible.

Sam Godfrey: Sara's father, who works in Ohio and visits on occasional weekends, prefers to distance himself from his family. Sara views her father as she would a stranger; he is not the same loving person that he once was.

== Reception ==
At the time of the book's publication, Kirkus Reviews said: "With increasing frequency juvenile fiction is contracting to the dimensions of a short story and the endoskeleton (dialogue, stage directions, asides to the audience) of drama--of which the climax to Sara's season of discontent is a good example... The book is a succession of clicks that connect, a sparse but acute self-possessing." In a retrospective essay about the Newbery Medal-winning books from 1966 to 1975, children's author John Rowe Townsend wrote, "The people in The Summer of the Swans are credible, tones of voice are accurately caught, and there is a frequent wry humor in the dialogue; but the book seems to me to be a slight one."

== Television adaptation ==
Summer of the Swans was filmed as Sara's Summer of the Swans for an ABC Afterschool Special broadcast October 2, 1974. It was directed by James B. Clark, with a teleplay by Bob Rodgers.

=== Cast ===
- Sara Godfrey: Heather Totten
- Charlie Godfrey: Reed Diamond
- Wanda Godfrey: Betty Ann Carr
- Willamina "Aunt Willie" Godfrey: Priscilla Morrill
- Joe Melby: Chris Knight
- Mary Weicek: Doney Oatman

(Brady Bunch costar Eve Plumb also appears in the TV special as Gretchen Wyant, a popular, pretty girl whom Sara also hates. Gretchen has no role in the book except for a story related by Sara in which Sara sprayed her with a garden hose for calling Charlie a "fool.")

Preceded by Sounder	Newbery Medal recipient 1971	Succeeded by Mrs. Frisby and the Rats of NIMH
