= Julia Sauer =

American children's writer

- Born: Julia Lina Sauer; April 8, 1891; Rochester, New York, US
- Died: June 26, 1983 (aged 92); Rochester, New York
- Education: University of Rochester; New York State Library School
- Occupations: Writer, librarian
- Writing career
- Genres: Children's fantasy, realistic fiction
- Notable works: Fog Magic; The Light at Tern Rock

Julia Sauer (April 8, 1891 – June 26, 1983) was an American writer of children's fiction and librarian. Two of her books, Fog Magic and The Light at Tern Rock, were among the annual Newbery Medal runners-up. Both are set in Canada, where Sauer had a summer home from the 1930s until the 1960s.

== Life ==
Julia Lina Sauer was born April 8, 1891, in Rochester, New York. When she was nine, she happened to witness the fatal shooting of a man on the sidewalk outside her home and she testified at the trial. She attended the University of Rochester and the New York State Library School at Albany. Sauer then returned to Rochester, where she was the head of the children's department at the Public Library from 1921 to 1958. Though she lived most of her life in Rochester, Sauer spent many summers in Little River, Nova Scotia, Canada. That area became the setting for the first of her award-winning books; the second is set off the coast of Nova Scotia.

As a librarian, Sauer became involved in the new medium of radio through the School of the Air, broadcasting programs for fifth through eleventh graders directly into schools. She eventually edited Radio Roads to Reading, a book on radio book talks for children. Her early work as a children's librarian brought her recognition with the American Library Association, and in 1939 she was appointed chairman of the Committee on Planning and Equipping Children's Libraries for the ALA.

By the early 1940s a debate, at times acrimonious, had developed about whether children's books should be imaginative escapes from reality or reflections of the trials and difficulties of modern life, including the Great Depression and developments leading to World War II. The side supporting fantasy was symbolized by the nightingale, a figure of ethereal beauty from fairy tales. Realists often pointed to the character of Janey Larkin from Doris Gates' book Blue Willow, the first realistic American problem novel for children. The ALA asked Julia Sauer to address the controversy, and in 1941 the Library Journal published her article "Making the World Safe for the Janey Larkins". In it, Sauer wrote that children should not be protected from the realities of their world. But, she argued, they need both realism and imagination. She finished with an appeal to her fellow librarians: "We need many more books about the Janey Larkins in our literature for children. And when we get them we will need the courage to give them to our children... before a world can be made safe even for nightingales, it must be made safe for the Janey Larkins."

Sauer presented the paper "Library Services to Children in a World at War" to the 8th Pan- American Child Congress in Washington, DC, in 1942. Her final children's book appeared in 1954. It tells the adventures of a small boy who checks out Mike Mulligan and His Steam Shovel so many times that he calls the library Mike's House. At the behest of the Atlantic Monthly, in 1955 Sauer and two others, Virginia Haviland and Elizabeth Gross, compiled a list of "50 Outstanding Books Published Since 1940". As well as writing, Sauer spoke throughout her life at colleges, library institutes and national meetings.

Julia Sauer died June 26, 1983, in Rochester, New York. Her papers are held at the Rochester public library and the University of Minnesota.

== Reception and legacy ==
Sauer wrote three books for children, two of which were among the annual Newbery Medal runners-up, now called Newbery Honor Books. All three books received starred reviews from Kirkus, for "books of remarkable merit". Her first book, Fog Magic, is a fantasy novel set in Nova Scotia. It was one of four Newbery runners-up in 1944. In it, Sauer addresses the debate of imagination versus realism that was raging at the time. As Mary Lystad writes in Twentieth-Century Children's Writers, "The story goes back and forth from the real present to the conjured-up past, pointing out the thin line between a person's reality and his fantasy, and the need for the acceptance of the two." Sauer's second novel, The Light at Tern Rock, received the Newbery Honor in 1952. Kirkus Reviews praised its keen sense of place, calling it "unusual and atmospheric".

Rebecca Stead, author of the 2010 Newbery Award book When You Reach Me, said in an interview, "There’s a book called Fog Magic by Julia L. Sauer that I loved very much, about a girl in Nova Scotia who discovers a village that appears only on foggy days. For a long time, I thought this was a secret book that only I knew about".

As a librarian, Sauer held high standards, saying, “The children’s librarian’s first obligation is always, I believe, to lead a child to the best there is for him, to help him, by what wisdom she may have, to appreciate the better and finally the best, and to keep him reading at the highest possible level.” As a writer, according to Marilyn Miller, Sauer "wrote with passion and compassion. What she wrote reverberated, influencing both authors as creators of children's books and children and what they read."

== Works ==
=== Fiction ===
- Fog Magic, Viking Press, 1943, ISBN 9780140321630;
- The Light at Tern Rock, Viking Press, 1951, ISBN 9780140368574;
- Mike's House, Viking Press, 1954, ISBN 9780670050345.

=== Other ===
- Radio Roads to Reading: Library Book Talks Broadcast to Boys and Girls, (editor), Wilson, 1939, ISBN 0-905392-07-8.
