= The Dogs of Babel =

2003 novel by Carolyn Parkhurst

- Author: Carolyn Parkhurst
- Language: English
- Genre: Novel
- Publisher: Little, Brown
- Publication date: 13 June 2003
- Publication place: United States
- Media type: Print (Paperback)
- Pages: 264 pp
- ISBN: 0-316-16868-8

The Dogs of Babel (also known as Lorelei's Secret in the UK) is the debut novel of Carolyn Parkhurst. It was one of The New York Times Notable Fiction & Poetry books of 2003. The novel became a best-seller. The Dogs of Babel was the first book that Parkhurst wrote; it was not the first novel that Parkhurst envisioned.

== Plot introduction ==
The book is narrated by Paul Iverson, a linguist who calls home one day to find out his wife is dead. He is very troubled by this and therefore for the remainder of the book he is trying to teach the only witness of her death, his dog Lorelei, to speak. Throughout the book, Paul uncovers more about his wife's last day and remembers events through their life they led up to it.

=== Explanation of the novel's title ===
The Dogs of Babel is an allusion to the Tower of Babel, the Biblical story that explains the existence of different languages. Like the builders in the story, Paul is hampered by the differences in communication between himself and Lorelei.

== Plot summary ==
Paul Iverson called home to find a police officer answering the phone and suggesting him to come home. When he comes home he finds his wife, Alexandra "Lexy" Ransome, dead, fallen from an apple tree. The police declared it an accident, but Paul is bothered by the "anomalies" he finds, such as signs of someone cooking steak, a rearrangement of the book shelf, and the question as to what his wife was doing in the apple tree in the first place. The only witness to her death is their dog Lorelei, and Paul goes on a crusade to teach Lorelei to speak, in order to clear up the mystery. He cites several past attempts as evidence he will be successful, especially the case of Dog J, who was surgically altered by Wendell Hollis, "the Dog Butcher of Brooklyn", so that he could make human sounds. Paul leaves his job at the college, and dedicates his time to this single cause.

As he attempts to teach Lorelei, Paul remembers how he and Lexy first met, at a yard sale where he bought a square hard-boiled egg mold from her. He recounts their week-long first date to Disney World, and to a wedding where Lexy delivered masks she made. This is the first time Paul learns about the masks she used to make for a living, and they are featured prominently throughout the rest of the book. Paul also remembers their wedding, and when he first learned of Lexy's depression, in the story she tells him about her adolescence.

Unhappy with his lack of progress, Paul writes a letter to Wendell Hollis (now in prison) in hopes of getting ideas. In a response letter, he is directed to a man named Remo, who lives in Paul's neighborhood and is in charge of the Cerberus Society, a group dedicated to canine communication. At a meeting of the Cerberus Society, Paul is horrified and intrigued by the methods they use, and is especially excited about hearing Dog J, whom the society has kidnapped, speak. He is disappointed, though, when the mutilated dog is presented at the podium and is unable to say a single word; the rest of the society oblivious to this. The meeting is cut short when the police raid it and Paul flees to his house to find Lorelei gone.

Finally realizing he will never be able to teach Lorelei to speak, and now left alone by both Lexy and Lorelei, Paul falls into an even greater depression. After hearing Lexy's voice on a commercial for a Psychic Hotline, he has been calling constantly, in hopes of finding the psychic Lexy talked to, Lady Arabelle. He finally reaches her, and is informed that Lexy was pregnant, a fact Paul knew but the reader did not. Lady Arabelle goes through the tarot reading she gave Lexy, and Paul is left to wonder how his wife took it.

Paul eventually finds Lorelei in an animal shelter, her larynx removed by the men who kidnapped her. She is now not only unable to speak English, but to even bark. When he idly examines Lorelei's collar, he finds a subtle message from Lexy. He suddenly realizes that Lexy has sent him a message through the rearrangement of books, a quote from the story Tam Lin. It is then Paul realizes what he has suspected is true, that Lexy committed suicide.

Although he continues to mourn his wife's death, the closure Paul has gotten by learning of its circumstances allow him to return to the world. He goes back to his job at the college, and stops his reclusive ways. The story ends on a happy note, but it is still clear Paul is grieving for his wife.

== Characters in The Dogs of Babel ==
- Paul Iverson - Linguist and husband of Lexy Ransome
- Alexandra "Lexy" Ransome - Mask-maker and wife of Paul Iverson. Her death prompts him to try to teach Lorelei to speak
- Lorelei - Paul and Lexy's Rhodesian Ridgeback, named after the German mythical siren Loreley
- Wendell Hollis - "Revolutionary" scientist who performs surgeries on dogs to enable them to speak

== Movie adaptation ==
A movie adaption with Steve Carell starring as Paul Iverson began filming in Toronto in 2018.

== Literary significance and reception ==
Viva Hardigg, in a review for Entertainment Weekly, wrote that "Parkhurst tells her tale with considerable skill... Parkhurst packs a serious literary arsenal, which she wields to good effect. Layers of allegory, symbolism, and mythic reference add texture and tension to the plot's unfolding. The name Lexy itself can be read as a gloss on lexicon, one that Paul, a disciple as faithful as his biblical antecedent, tries to catalog. Lexy named Lorelei for the Rhine maiden who lures sailors to their deaths with her siren song, underscoring the notion that Paul's desire to hear the dog's voice could lead to his undoing. Just how far should an individual probe in the name of science and love before perversion outstrips purpose? Despite Parkhurst's flirtations with the supernatural in exploring that question, The Dogs of Babel remains at its core a humanistic parable of the heart's confusions." Author Stephen King, also writing for Entertainment Weekly, wrote in a 2007 column on his likes and dislikes, "I believe that 70 percent of the fiction and nonfiction best-seller lists is dreck... I also believe that a book that sells a million copies--as The Dogs of Babel, by Carolyn Parkhurst, may eventually do--is not automatically trash."

== See also for allusions ==
- Tam Lin
- Tower of Babel (through the title)
