= The Light at Tern Rock =

1951 novel by Julia Sauer

- First edition
- Author: Julia Sauer
- Illustrator: Georges Schreiber
- Genre: Children's Realistic Fiction
- Publisher: Viking Press
- Publication date: 1951
- ISBN: 9780140368574

The Light at Tern Rock is a children's novel by Julia Sauer. Illustrated by Georges Schreiber, it was first published in 1951 and received a Newbery Honor award in 1952.

When Ronnie and his aunt agree to take care of the lighthouse at Tern Rock while the keeper takes a break, they do not expect to be spending Christmas there.

== See also ==
Fog Magic, Sauer's other Newbery Honor book
