= Blue Willow =

1940 novel by Doris Gates

- First edition
- Author: Doris Gates
- Illustrator: Paul Lantz
- Language: English
- Genre: Children's novel
- Publisher: Viking Press
- Publication date: 1940
- Publication place: United States
- Media type: Print (Hardcover)
- Pages: 172pp

Blue Willow is a realistic children's fiction book by Doris Gates, published in 1940. Called the "juvenile Grapes of Wrath", it was named a Newbery Honor book in 1941. Written by a librarian who worked with migrant children in Fresno, California, this story of a migrant girl who longs for a permanent home was considered groundbreaking in its portrayal of contemporary working-class life in America.

== Plot ==
Janey Larkin is the ten-year-old daughter of a migrant family in San Joaquin Valley, California, in the late 1930s when America is still suffering the effects of the Great Depression. Her most treasured possession is a Blue Willow plate that had once belonged to her great-great-grandmother. The picture of a bridge and a stream and a little house on the willow pattern plate represents the permanent home she dreams of.

Janey can barely remember her old home, a farm in Texas, and now that her father is an itinerant worker she has no place to call her own and no lasting friends, as the family has to move constantly. Despite their poverty, the family participates in many activities together, as when Janey and her friend Lupe attend the county fair, and when the family goes fishing beside the river.

When Janey's mother falls sick, they have difficulty paying the rent. The rent-collector, Bounce Reyburn, is unsympathetic, and Janey is faced with having to sacrifice her one treasure. However, after she tells Bounce's boss what is happening, he fires Reyburn and hires Janey's dad. The boss and Lupe's brothers then build Janey's dream house for her family.

== Symbolism ==
Janey's blue willow plate is her one prized possession. It belonged to her great-great-grandmother, and reminds Janey of her birth mother, who died so long ago Janey can hardly remember her. The fragile plate holds both her past and her future. To Janey the plate symbolizes the home she had before they lost their land and became migrant farmers. The plate represents Janey's hope for a better life and a real home. When Janey, somewhat nervously, shows it to Lupe and her friend understands how important and beautiful it is to Janey, the girls' friendship is solidified.

== Significance ==
Blue Willow has been called "the first social- or realistic-problem novel for children". It was well received but not without criticism for its topic. The character of Janey Larkin became a symbol for proponents of realistic fiction for children. At the time of the book's publication there was a debate about whether children's literature should be imaginative or realistic. In fact, though, Blue Willow combines realism and imagination. The setting is almost brutally realistic, but Janey's devotion to the plate and the home it represents depends upon her ability to look beyond her circumstances and believe in a dream. Blue Willow was seen to have the literary quality and positive values sought by librarians and educators as well as appealing to children. It was considered a breakthrough book for its contemporary working-class setting and for the rounded portrayal of Janey's Mexican-American friend, Lupe Romero, and her family. Because of the success of Blue Willow there was an "expansion of the range of subjects which could be explored in books for children."

Many writers of the realist school preferred setting their books in foreign countries or in the past, possibly to avoid any suggestion of leftist propaganda. In Horn Book magazine Howard Pease's essay "Without Evasion" mentions Doris Gates as one of the rare exceptions: "Only at infrequent intervals do you find a story intimately related to this modern world, a story that takes up a modern problem and thinks it through without evasion. Of our thousands of books, I can find scarcely half a dozen that merit places on this almost vacant shelf in our libraries; and of our hundreds of authors, I can name only three who are doing anything to fill this void in children's reading. These three authors - may someone present each of them with a laurel wreath - are Doris Gates, John R. Tunis, and Florence Crannell Means."

The Blue Willow manuscript is held in the May Massee Collection at Emporia State University.

== Awards and reception ==
Blue Willow was a Newbery Honor book in 1941, won the Lewis Carroll Shelf Award in 1961, and was named one of the Best Books of the Year by Horn Book Magazine; It also won the silver Commonwealth Club of California Book Award. It has continued to be well received. Choosing Books for Kids says of it, "Family life in the thirties in a poignant story that has outlasted the era it tells about." Children's literature expert May Hill Arbuthnot calls Blue Willow "a tender and beautifully written book". Another reviewer wrote "One sees in Blue Willow a perfect combination of realistic depiction of setting, careful study of character, and the structural patterns of romance, the linear journey to fulfillment. The book is Gates's major literary achievement and an important contribution to American children's literature."

== See also ==
- Migrant Workers in 1930s
- Lois Lenski, also known for her realistic children's regional fiction
- Julia Sauer and her article "Making the World Safe for the Janey Larkins"
