= Fairy Ointment =

English fairy tale

Fairy Ointment or "The Fairy Nurse" is an English fairy tale collected by Joseph Jacobs in his English Fairy Tales. It has been told in many variants. Andrew Lang included one in The Lilac Fairy Book.

The ointment itself, as a substance allowing a human to see fairies, occasionally appears in fantasy literature. Folk-tales about such an ointment are found in Scandinavia, France and the British Isles.

== Synopsis ==
A midwife is summoned to attend a childbed. The baby is born, and she is given an ointment to rub in its eyes. Accidentally, or through curiosity, she rubs one or both her own eyes with it. This enables her to see the actual house to which she has been summoned. Sometimes a simple cottage becomes a castle, but most often, a grand castle becomes a wretched cave.

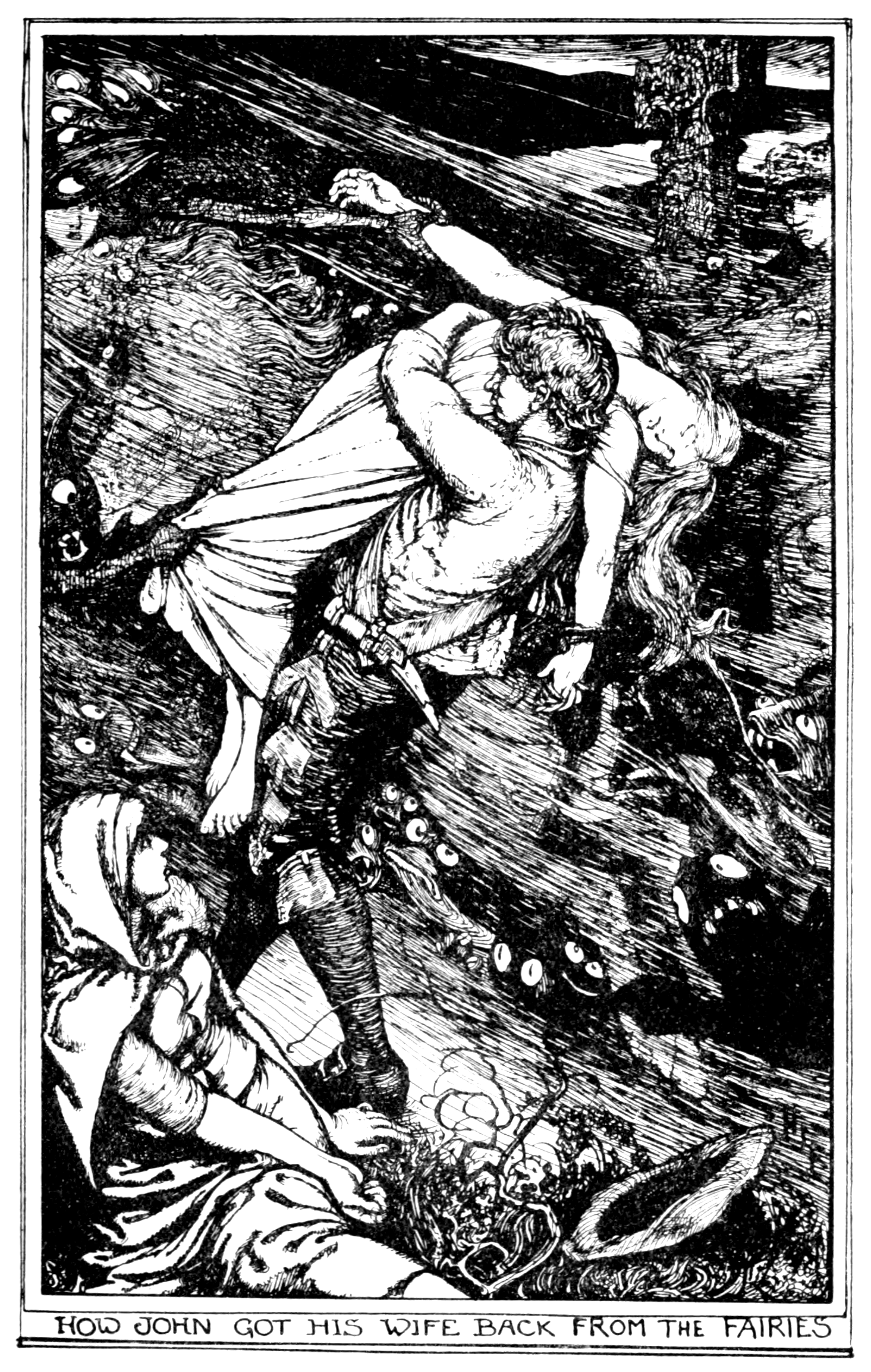
Illustration to The Lilac Fairy Book

In the variant Andrew Lang included, the woman saw a neighbor of hers, kept prisoner as a nurse, and was able to tell her husband how to rescue her, pulling her down from riding fairies as in Tam Lin.

Soon, the midwife sees a fairy and admits it. The fairy invariably blinds her in the eye that can see him, or both if she put the ointment in both eyes.

In a Cornish tale a woman, Joan, is going to market to buy shoes, and calls on a neighbour, Betty, who has a reputation for witchcraft, to see if she will go along. Joan sees Betty rub an ointment into her children's eyes. When Betty is out of the room she rubs some of the ointment into right eye out of curiosity. Betty returns with a glass of brandy, and when Joan drinks the brandy she is amazed to see that the cottage is full of little people dancing and playing games. Betty says she won't go to market, so Joan goes alone.

At the market, Joan sees Betty's husband, Thomas Trenance, taking "whatever took his fancy" from the market stalls and putting it into a bag, apparently unnoticed by the stall holders. She challenges him as a thief. He asks which eye she sees him with, and when she points to her right eye he touches it with his finger and she is instantly blinded.

== Other uses ==
Fairy ointment also appears in many other fairy tales and books of fantasy, usually as a method for seeing through a fairy's magic. For example, in Eloise McGraw's The Moorchild, the protagonists enter a fairy hill in search of a stolen child, but are confused and hypnotized by the fairies' glamour until they smear their eyes with stolen fairy ointment. These tales, of the fairy or magic ointment, come under type: ML 5070 "Midwife to the fairies" (see also The Queen of Elfan's Nourice) It is Aarne-Thompson type 476*.
