= Doris Gates =

American children's writer, librarian

- Born: Doris Gates; November 26, 1901; Mountain View, California
- Died: September 3, 1987 (aged 85); Carmel, California, USA
- Occupations: Writer, librarian
- Writing career
- Genre: Realistic children's literature
- Notable work: Blue Willow
- Notable awards: Lewis Carroll Shelf Award

Doris Gates (November 26, 1901 – September 3, 1987) was one of America's first writers of realistic children's fiction. Her novel Blue Willow, about the experiences of Janey Larkin, the ten-year-old daughter of a migrant farm worker in 1930s California, is a Newbery Honor book and Lewis Carroll Shelf Award winner. A librarian in Fresno, California, Gates lived and worked among the people described in her novels. She is also known for her collections of Greek mythology.

== Life ==
Doris Gates was born on November 26, 1901, in Mountain View, California, the oldest daughter of Charles Obed and Bessie Louise (Jones) Gates. Her father was a small-town doctor; her mother had a BA from Milton College in classical studies. When she was seven they moved to Charles' parents' prune ranch outside San Jose. It was there, at the age of eight, that Doris began school. According to Gates, her childhood, "even for those times, was unusually happy." She wrote about it in The Elderberry Bush. Later the Gates family moved to Los Gatos. After graduating from high school, Gates found work in a library and a grocery store. Her father then moved the family to Fresno, and in 1924 she enrolled in Fresno State Teachers College.

Two years later Gates attended Los Angeles Library School. She then became the assistant in the children's department of the Fresno County Free Library. After one year Gates took a leave of absence to study library science at Western Reserve University, (now Case Western Reserve) in Cleveland. She returned to Fresno to work as the children's librarian at the Fresno County Library in central California from 1930 to 1940. (Note: Some sources give the dates as 1931-1940.)

While in Fresno, Gates had a radio program telling stories to children. She also visited the schools erected for the children of workers displaced by the Dust Bowl, telling stories and sharing books. Budget constraints caused the library to cut back its hours, so Gates used her extra day off to begin writing. Her first published book, Sarah's Idea (1938), is about a girl who wants to buy a burro and helps with the harvest on her family's prune ranch to earn the money she needs. Two years later Blue Willow, a book about the daughter of a migrant farmer like those she worked with, appeared. Also in 1940, Gates began working for San Jose State College, teaching children's literature and storytelling.

Gates was a visiting lecturer at the University of California, Berkeley; the University of Southern California, Los Angeles; and the University of San Francisco. She also spoke around the country to groups of librarians and teachers. In the 1960s she worked for the textbook publishers Ginn and Company editing the Ginn Basic Readers, a series of reading textbooks for elementary schools. Married and later divorced, she moved to Carmel, where she bought and rode horses. Several of her later books reflect this interest, including A Morgan for Melinda.

In 1971 and 1972 Gates made two trips to Greece, in preparation for a series of books retelling Greek mythology. As she later said, "I had a storyteller's knowledge rather than a scholar's knowledge of the myths". In 1972 she published the first two in a series of books based on Greek myths. She returned to Greece in 1983.

Doris Gates died in Carmel, California, on September 3, 1987. (Note: Some sources say Monterey, CA.) The children's room at the Central Fresno Library has been named the Doris Gates Room in her honor. Gates' papers are held at the University of Oregon and the University of Minnesota.

== Influence ==
Blue Willow was a ground-breaking children's novel. "Many consider Blue Willow to have been the first realistic, problem novel for children, and it was recognized both for its lasting literary merit and for its expansion of the range of subjects which could be explored in books for children." Children's literature expert Anita Silvey says its realistic handling of modern social issues is a "significant contribution to children's literature". Christine Jenkins writes in Literary Trends that librarians for children especially appreciated its "combination of literary quality, child appeal, and positive values." The working class setting and portrayal of migrant families conditions were firsts for children's literature, and the fact that Gates made Janey's best friend a Mexican American was also groundbreaking. Jenkins says "the publication and professional recognition accorded Blue Willow was an affirmation of the value of both imaginative and realistic literature for children."

When Blue Willow was published there was an ongoing debate among teachers and librarians about whether children's literature should be imaginative or realistic. Blue Willow was both; but the story of Janey, her father and step-mother, living in a shack in central California while working in the fields, was generally more recognized for its realism. Julia Sauer, head children's services librarian in Rochester, New York, was commissioned by the American Library Association to address the divisive issue. In Making the World Safe for the Janey Larkins, Sauer wrote "We need many more books about the Janey Larkins in our literature for children. And when we get them we will need the courage to give them to our children." In Horn Book, Jan/Feb 1945, Howard Pease's essay "Without Evasion" says this: "Only at infrequent intervals do you find a story intimately related to this modern world, a story that takes up a modern problem and thinks it through without evasion. Of our thousands of books, I can find scarcely half a dozen that merit places on this almost vacant shelf in our libraries; and of our hundreds of authors, I can name only three who are doing anything to fill this void in children's reading. These three authors - may someone present each of them with a laurel wreath - are Doris Gates, John R. Tunis, and Florence Crannell Means."

== Awards and reception ==
Several of Gates' books were recognized with awards. Blue Willow was one runner-up for the annual Newbery Medal, was named to the Lewis Carroll Shelf Award list in 1961, and was named one of the Best Books of the Year by Horn Book Magazine. It also won the silver Commonwealth Club of California Book Award. Sarah's Idea and The Cat and Mrs. Cary were also named Horn Book Best Books of the Year, and Little Vic was given the William Allen White Award by the school children of Kansas.

Gates' work was appreciated especially for its characterization and sense of place. Twentieth-Century Children's Writers praises her use of traditional story elements and strong sense of structure. According to another reviewer "Gates writes with integrity, combining strength of story line with well-developed characters, authentic settings, and themes of consequence." The reviewer goes on to say her excellent characterization and sensitivity toward her characters make her books "a solid contribution to American children's literature".

== Selected works ==
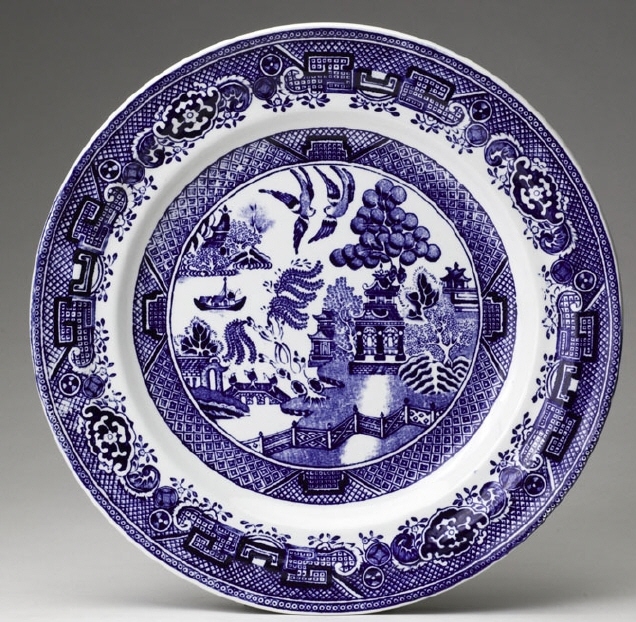
Plate with a blue willow pattern like Janey Larkin's in Blue Willow

=== Children's novels ===
- Sarah's Idea, Viking Press, 1938 (illustrated by Marjorie Torrey)
- Blue Willow, Viking Press, 1940 (illustrated by Paul Lantz)
- Sensible Kate, Viking Press, 1943 (illustrated by Marjorie Torrey)
- Trouble for Jerry, Viking Press, 1944 (illustrated by Marjorie Torrey)
- North Fork, Viking Press, 1945 (illustrated by Wesley Dennis)
- My Brother Mike, Viking Press, 1948 (illustrated by Wesley Dennis)
- River Ranch, Viking Press, 1949 (illustrated by Jacob Landau)
- Little Vic, Viking Press, 1951 (illustrated by Kate Seredy)
- Becky and the Bandit, Ginn & Co., 1955 (illustrated by Paul Lantz)
- The Cat and Mrs. Cary, Viking Press, 1962 (illustrated by Peggy Bacon (US) and Shirley Hughes (UK))
- The Elderberry Bush, Viking Press, 1967 (illustrated by Lilian Obligado)
- A Morgan for Melinda, Viking Press, 1980
- A Filly for Melinda, Viking Press, 1984

=== Myths and legends ===
- Lord of the Sky: Zeus, Viking Press, 1972 (illustrated by Robert Handville)
- The Warrior Goddess: Athena, Viking Press, 1972 (illustrated by Don Bolognese)
- The Golden God: Apollo, Viking Press, 1973 (illustrated by Constantinos Coconis)
- Two Queens of Heaven: Aphrodite and Demeter, Viking Press, 1974 (illustrated by Trina Schart Hyman)
- The Mightiest of Mortals: Hercules, Viking Press, 1975 (illustrated by Richard Cuffari)
- A Fair Wind for Troy, Viking Press, 1976 (illustrated by Charles Mikolaycak)

=== Textbooks ===
- Roads to Everywhere, Ginn, 1961;
- Trails to Treasure, Ginn, 1961;
- Wings to Adventure, Ginn, 1961;
- Along Story Trails, Ginn, 1962;
- Down Story Roads, Ginn, 1962;
- On Story Wings, Ginn, 1962.

== See also ==
- Lois Lenski, also known for her realistic children's regional fiction
