= The Computer Nut =

1984 children's novel by Betsy Byars

- First edition (UK)
- Author: Betsy Byars
- Language: English
- Genre: Children's novel, Sci-Fi
- Publisher: Viking Kestrel (US); The Bodley Head (UK)
- Publication date: 1984
- Dewey Decimal: 813
- LC Class: PZ7.B9836Co

The Computer Nut is a 1984 children's novel written by Betsy Byars. It was the first novel Betsy Byars wrote on her new computer.

== Plot summary ==
Kate Morrison, the title character, is receiving messages on her computer purportedly from an extraterrestrial, BB-9, who claims he can monitor and control all computers on Earth. At first, she and her friend Linda investigate the communication as a prank; their suspects are Willie Lomax and Frank Wilkins.

== Reception ==
The novel won the 1986–1987 Charlie May Simon Children's Book Award. A reviewer from Kirkus Reviews stated the "who's-on-the-computer? gambit, and the true-to-character humor holds up well enough to keep readers going--even if the thwarted space-comedian bombs out." Caroline Ward from the School Library Journal did not view the book as positively, commenting that the book's "[p]lot and characterization fall short of Byars' usual perceptive fare" and it is "not convincing as either an alien-from-another-world story or as an addition to the plethora of computer fiction." Zena Sutherland, writing for Bulletin of the Center for Children's Books, stated the book was "at times funny," but that "it's not up to Byars' usual high standard in plot or cohesion of content." Julia Briggs, writing in The Times Literary Supplement, felt the book failed to "exploit the intriguing if unpoetic possibilities of computer language."
