= The Sherwood Ring =

1958 novel by Elizabeth Marie Pope

- First edition
- Author: Elizabeth Marie Pope
- Illustrator: Evaline Ness
- Language: English
- Genre: Young adult
- Publisher: Houghton Mifflin
- Publication date: 1958
- Media type: Print (Hardcover and Paperback)
- Pages: 272 pp (1958 Hardcover edition), 256 pp (paperback edition)
- ISBN: 978-0-618-17737-0 (2001 Hardcover edition)
- OCLC: 48203680

The Sherwood Ring is a 1958 young adult novel by Elizabeth Marie Pope.

The story of Peggy Grahame, and how she is forced to relocate to her uncle's estate when she is orphaned. Along the way she meets the ghosts of many characters from the Revolutionary Period.

== Plot summary ==
When seventeen-year-old Peggy Grahame's father dies, she has no choice but to reside in the home of her only remaining relative, her uncle Enos. She journeys to her family's ancestral estate, "Rest-and-be-thankful," in Orange County, New York, and soon finds her uncle to be an eccentric and rather crochety man who is obsessed with his family's history. While Peggy strikes up a tentative friendship with a young British man called Pat, who is doing some research in America, her uncle is quick to forbid the two from seeing each other. Peggy is forced to spend much of her time alone in the large, Colonial house, and soon discovers it to be haunted by the ghosts of her eighteenth-century ancestors and their contemporaries. The ghosts relate their stories in first-person narratives throughout the book which are interwoven with the narrative of the present day. With the help of the ghosts' stories, Peggy is able to unravel a centuries-old family mystery, win the affection of her uncle and find a romance of her own.

== Characters in the present day ==
- Peggy Grahame: An independent young woman who, when orphaned, is sent to live with her uncle Enos in an old, colonial house, and she views this change apprehensively. She soon meets with a young man named Pat, and they develop a promising acquaintance. Her uncle, however, forbids her to see him, and Peggy is left wondering why. Her uncle most often ignores her, treating her like a child when she does interfere, and she begins to be very lonely. Then the spirits of her Colonial ancestors visit her, filling some of her rather dull and uneventful days. She eagerly awaits their visits, as well as the secret communications she keeps up with Pat. She learns more of her history as she listens to her predecessors and roams around the old house, unravelling the mysteries of the past. In many ways she is like her ancestor Barbara Grahame, who visits her most often.
- Enos Grahame: A mean-tempered old man, obsessed with history and nothing else. He is selfish and thinks himself above everyone, and cannot stand failing in anything. Though he shows a fairer side, both by taking Peggy in and eventually offering to accept the relationship and connections with Pat. Though not a character to appear in a goodly amount of the book, he plays a pivotal role in the Colonial mystery, trying to keep all he knows to himself and furiously berating anyone who dares ask him anything about it. He is the brother of Peggy's father.
- Pat Thorne: A charming young man who kindly offers Peggy a ride when she is lost. He is agreeable and laughs easily. He has a tendency to be rather lazy in manner, though it is said of him that he works harder than the rest of his family. He is very poor, and is in America to try to unravel the mystery of his own past, some of which he is ashamed of, keeping parts of it hidden. He plans to be a teacher back in England, and is partial to his dilapidated car which he has lovingly christened 'Betsy.'

== Characters in the past ==
- Richard Grahame: Originally a pompous, ambitious man, Colonel Richard Grahame, or rather, 'Dick,' is sent back to his home town to hunt for the notorious marauder Peaceable Drummond Sherwood, who has been terrorizing the area with his band of guerrilla soldiers for some time. Dick is very proud to have been chosen for the job, but is very upset at learning that he and his troops will be staying at Shipley Farm—the home of his childhood acquaintance, Eleanor Shipley, whom he still despises and considers an insufferable brat. Once there, however, Dick devotes every moment to attempting to capture Peaceable Sherwood, though to no avail. All his tricks fail, and Dick begins to think he is about to go mad with the strain of it. Finally, he finds a clue as to where he can find the criminal, and recklessly pushes on alone. He is sorely beaten, and Peaceable Sherwood escapes. Humbled and sore, Dick returns to Shipley Farm, where he is met by a worried Eleanor. They declare their feelings for each other, and the future looks more promising for a new, less proud and wiser, Dick.
- Eleanor Shipley: Eleanor is a small woman, often described as moving and looking like a butterfly. She is witty and bright, and in her childhood would do anything to get Dick's attention. She has a very bad temper, though is more often very caring and generous. One day, when another man, Colonel Van Spurter, arrives to take Dick's post as the army thinks he has been taking too long, a letter arrives by way of one of the spies, stolen from one of Peaceable Sherwood's very own men. It is in code, and Eleanor and Dick try to hurry to look for the real message. There is a false note, and Colonel Van Spurter—not being the most clever—runs off in pursuit, while Eleanor and Dick continue to pore over the paper, finally revealing the true message. Dick gathers his troops and they almost manage to capture Peaceable Sherwood, but he escapes. Dick comes back bruised and battered, and Eleanor helps nurse him back to health, after her usual rather bossy manner.
- Barbara Grahame: As Dick's little sister, she has grown up looking up to him, and loves him dearly. But when he and their father go into the army, she has no choice but to stay with her horrible Aunt Susanna, a tyrant of the meanest nature, ruling her house to the point of tangible misery in the very air. When Barbara asks to spend Christmas with Dick and Eleanor at Shipley Farm, Aunt Susanna absolutely refuses, and promptly pretends to fall ill to prevent Barbara's leaving. Luckily, however, on Christmas Day, Aunt Susanna runs out of her headache drops, and sends Barbara to fetch more from the apothecary. Barbara takes the opportunity to visit her brother, but gets caught in an awful snowstorm on the way. Nearly dead, she runs into a small band of men, who take her to shelter. She had fainted, and awakens to find herself in her old home—Rest-and-Be-Thankful, with the last person she expected to spend any time whatsoever with—Peaceable Sherwood. He is polite and welcoming, but is thoroughly surprised at Barbara's strength of mind and refusal to panic. He takes her to see Dick—who was now locked in the prison in the cellar—and the brother and sister use a code they had devised to send messages to each other while feigning real conversation. Dick insists that Barbara not meddle, worrying that she'll get herself in trouble.
- Peaceable Drummond Sherwood: Dashing British officer and tactical genius, Peaceable Sherwood is the antagonist and hero of this novel. His lazy personality and wit masks his real strength and intelligence. The novel begins with his group of secret guerrilla's terrorizing the countryside in a shockingly effective manner.
