= Burd Ellen and Young Tamlane =

Traditional song

Burd Ellen and Young Tamlane (Roud 3962, Child 28) is a traditional English-language folk song. Despite similarity in names, it appears to have no connection with Tam Lin, nor with the tale of Childe Rowland, though they both have characters named Burd Ellen; indeed, Francis James Child was unable to connect this ballad with any other tradition or ballad.

== Synopsis ==
Burd Ellen is weeping. Young Tamlane tells her to rock her son. She tells him to rock the child himself, she has done more than her share. Instead, he goes to sea, with her curse.

== Lyrics ==
Burd Ellen sits in her bower windowe,
With a double laddy double
And for the double dow
Twisting the red silk and the blue
With the double rose and the May-hay.

And whiles she twisted and whiles she twan
And whiles the tears fell down amang.

Till once thee by cam Young Tamlane
"Come light, oh light, and rock your young son."

"If you winna roack him, you may not let him rair,
For I hae rockit my share and more."

Young Tamlane to the seas he's gane,
And a' women's curse in his company gane.

== See also ==
- List of the Child Ballads
