= The Perilous Gard =

1974 novel by Elizabeth Marie Pope

- First edition
- Author: Elizabeth Marie Pope
- Illustrator: Richard Cuffari
- Language: English
- Genre: Young adult novel
- Publisher: Houghton Mifflin Harcourt
- Publication date: 1974
- Publication place: United States
- Media type: Print (Paperback)
- Pages: 288 pp
- ISBN: 0618150730
- OCLC: 790324

The Perilous Gard is an American young adult novel by Elizabeth Marie Pope, published in 1974. It was awarded the Newbery Honor in 1975.

== Plot summary ==
The Perilous Gard takes place in England during the 1550s. The lead character, Kate Sutton, is a lady-in-waiting to Princess Elizabeth (the later Queen Elizabeth I of England). Her sister, Alicia, inadvertently gets her exiled to a castle named Elvenwood Hall, also known as the Perilous Gard, where she finds that the daughter of Sir Geoffrey Heron, the master of the hall, vanished under mysterious circumstances that implicate his brother, Christopher Heron. Kate soon discovers that, although the seeming death of little Cecily was an accident, Christopher is still so overwhelmed with grief that he has exiled himself from castle life. When Kate learns of the local villagers' fears that the "Fairy Folk" will kidnap their children, she guesses that Cecily might not be dead after all. She tells Christopher of her suspicions, and he, unbeknownst to Kate, comes up with a desperate plan to save Cecily. Meanwhile, Kate stumbles into the underground world of the Fairy Folk, who intend to use Christopher's desperation to their own advantage. The Fairy Folk are ruled by the Lady in Green, who believes that only a sacrifice can help her people hold their own against the advancing modern world.

Kate detests the Lady in Green at first, but the two of them have much in common. Both are strong-willed, highly independent, and capable of enormous self-discipline. Kate's refusal to be drugged or manipulated in other ways soon gains her a measure of respect among the Fairy Folk. Little by little she gains knowledge of their underground kingdom, while her view of the Lady in Green gradually changes. Kate begins to understand and even to respect the Lady in Green. In the end, however, Kate chooses to leave the Fairy Folk in order to save Christopher, destroying the fairy kingdom in the process. Christopher then takes Cecily to London to live with his sister Jennifer. When Christopher returns he proposes to Kate, and she accepts. Kate is granted freedom when Queen Elizabeth I ascends the throne.

== Characters ==
- Kate Sutton—Kate, short for Katherine, is a lady-in-waiting to Princess Elizabeth. Kate is intelligent, clever, stubborn, and direct. She views herself as a realist and has little use for ballads (like "Tam Lin") or the Arthurian romances. Outwardly, she appears cold and confident: inwardly, she feels plain and uncertain of herself. Kate has frequently been compared (negatively) with her younger sister. Her time in the Elvenwood, her first experience without Alicia at her side, helps give her confidence that her gifts, while different from Alicia's, are no less important. It helps that, in the underground realm of the Fairy Folk, she is taught to move as the Fae do by one assigned to instruct her in grace and suppleness. In Kate's secret search for Christopher, she finds favor in the sight of The Fairy Queen.
- Christopher Heron—Christopher, a young man in his early twenties, has a caring nature that he sometimes masks with sarcasm and outward hostility. He does not want Kate or his brother to recognize how distraught he is at Cecily's disappearance. Kate's relationship with him is initially stormy, but their mutual captivity by the Fairy Folk — Christopher for the paying of the teind, followed by Kate who's made a servant to the Fae — helps Christopher to become more open with her. During his "death-time," Kate secretly visits the imprisoned Christopher and they discuss in detail his manor and plans for it, sitting shoulder-to-shoulder on opposite sides of an impenetrable woven door. By doing so, Kate gives him a grounding in reality when he most needs it.
- Sir Geoffry Heron—Upright and unimaginative, Sir Geoffrey had no idea that his wife's family had ties to a secret cult beneath Elvenwood Hall. He, with Christopher, initially believes that his daughter is dead. Busy with his service to Queen Mary, he also does not realize just how deeply Christopher is grieving Cecily, or that Christopher might put himself in danger to save her.
- Master John—The steward of Elvenwood Hall, Master John is both greedy and unscrupulous. He does not believe in the religion of the Fairy Folk, but he aids them because of the money they offer him.
- Old Dorothy—Like many longtime castle servants, Old Dorothy is aware of Sir John's dealings with the Fairy Folk. She probably suspects Cecily's real fate, but she is too frightened of the Fairy Folk to tell Sir Geoffrey.
- The Fairy Queen—Also known as the Lady in Green, she is honest (but in a deceptive way), scrupulous, and cold. She is never intentionally cruel, but she will take extreme measures when she believes the overall good of her people is at stake.
- Alicia Sutton—Pretty but featherbrained, Alicia is several years younger than Kate. She has good intentions but frequently does not realize that actions she views as innocent can have serious consequences.
- Princess Elizabeth—Later Queen Elizabeth I, the princess is strong-willed but realistic. She understands that fighting with her older half-sister Queen Mary will not help her situation, but she intends to right Mary's wrongs as soon as she becomes queen, including the wrong done to Kate.
- Cecily Heron—Four years old, Cecily is little affected by her long months with the Fairy Folk, during which she lived as one of them. Fortunately for Cecily, they considered children unable to go through the harsh teind training that Christopher later underwent, nor did children have the strength and power of a fit, grown man that the Fairy folk needed transferred to them through the ritual sacrifice of the teind that would sustain them for centuries thereafter.

== Themes ==
The story is structured around the ballad of Tam Lin. The sacrifice of the "teind," or "tenth," which plays a major role in the novel as well as the ballad, is based on Scottish fairy lore. According to these legends, the fairies live beneath mounds or barrows under the earth. Since Hades was considered to be a place beneath the ground by many early Christians--Hippolytus, for instance, called it "a locality beneath the earth, in which the light of the world does not shine"—many Scottish ballads considered the fairies to essentially be vassals of Satan. As such, they had to periodically pay the devil for their use of the land. Paying at the correct time of year was considered essential. Since half-yearly rents in Scotland were due on All Saints' Day, or "Hallowmas," local laws may have contributed to this tradition. In the novel, however, the Fairy Folk believe they are offering the teind to their gods; or, more correctly, in order to absorb the power from the teind offered in sacrifice, in order to empower and enable them and their realm to continue for many centuries more.

The Perilous Gard also contains references to the Thomas the Rhymer ballad and to the Arthurian legends, as well. Kate initially dislikes British folklore because she believes that it is unrealistic. As the story unfolds, however, she finds that the folklore she once despised is based on fact, and that understanding it may allow her to save Christopher from the Fairy Queen.

Author J.B. Cheaney, in her review of the book in 2011, writes that "The Perilous Gard combines a love story with issues central to Christianity and paganism" in which Christians "seem to be the good guys" which indeed, for the most part, they are. The "paganism" is, rather, the "Fairy Tale" realm of the Fae (Fay), or Fairies (Faeries). On an historical note: Edmund Spenser's epic poem The Faerie Queen was written in celebration of Queen Elizabeth I at the end of the 1500s; and Shakespeare includes fairies or references to fairies in several of his plays. Thus, it can be said that the realm of faerie was of common interest in the Tudor time period. And so, remarkably, The Perilous Gard is both fantasy and historical fiction.

For some readers, the name Elvenwood might call up vague echos of Elves, Tolkien-style, but no more than that. Cheaney declares that "the 'fairies', as Ms. Pope presents them, are scrupulously just in their dealings with humans and any bargain struck they will keep, no matter the cost to anyone. But, as Kate perceives, humans don’t need justice from fairies: 'We’re all of us under the mercy [i.e., of Christ].'"

Cheaney, in keeping with her view of paganism rather than the fairy tale aspect of fantasy, says of the ages-long-ago historical pagans, theirs was a "nature-worship paired with blood sacrifice, mindless ecstasy marred by fear, a relentless eye-for-eye accounting system that left no room for compassion." Except for the lack of compassion, this description doesn't apply the Fairies in The Perilous Gard.

Kate's freeing of Christopher from death as the teind sacrifice dooms the Fairy Realm of Elvenwood (the last bastion of the Fae) to destruction, and the Fae to a wandering life, with little power, shadows of their former selves. She regrets their loss, and in some ways misses their way of life.

== Publication history ==
The Perilous Gard was first released in 1974 by Houghton Mifflin Harcourt. It was reprinted in 2001, and RecordedBooks produced an audiobook version that same year. The audiobook is narrated by Jill Tanner.
