= The Cartoonist (book) =

1978 book by Betsy Byars

- First edition
- Author: Betsy Byars
- Illustrator: Richard Cuffari
- Cover artist: Richard Cuffari
- Language: English
- Genre: Children's literature
- Publisher: Viking Children's Books (US); The Bodley Head (UK)
- Publication date: April 3, 1978
- Publication place: United States
- Pages: 119
- ISBN: 978-0670205561
- Preceded by: The Pinballs
- Followed by: The Winged Colt of Casa Mia

The Cartoonist is a 1978 book by Betsy Byars.

== Summary ==
Alfie's grandfather is becoming senile, his sympathetic older sister is usually working, and his immature, TV-watching mother is chiefly a nuisance to be avoided. But Alfie has his attic room, where he draws and hangs up the cartoons — Super Bird, Super Caterpillar, Super Ring — that constantly occupy his mind and inspire his dreams of future fame.

Then Bubba, Alfie's married older brother and his mother's obvious favorite, loses his job on the gas pump, and mom, delighted, plans to fix up the attic room for him and the pregnant Maureen. The others are shocked, no one but Mom ever cared for the no-good Bubba, but she insists. (Only he can "make her laugh.") And so Alfie takes to the attic, securing the trap door and refusing to answer even the call of his friend Tree, until, after 24 hours, a furious Mom reports that Bubba and wife are moving in with her parents, who offer better accommodations.

"You've won," she calls to Alfie, but he knows it is not so. Still, on the ladder coming down, he surprises himself by thinking up a cartoon based on the experience.
