= Old Ben =

1970 book by Jesse Stuart

- Author: Jesse Stuart
- Illustrator: Richard Cuffari
- Cover artist: Richard Cuffari
- Language: English
- Genre: Children's literature
- Publisher: McGraw-Hill
- Publication date: January 1970
- Publication place: United States
- ISBN: 978-0070622081

Old Ben is a 1970 book by Jesse Stuart, illustrated by Richard Cuffari. It was selected for the 1970 Lewis Carroll Shelf Award.

== Summary ==
The story of Shan, a Kentucky boy, and the friendship he forms with a big bull black snake.
