= Fog Magic =

- Author: Julia Sauer
- Illustrator: Lynd Ward
- Genre: Children's Fantasy
- Publisher: Viking Press
- Publication date: 1943
- ISBN: 978-0140321630

Fog Magic by Julia L. Sauer is a children's fantasy novel set in Nova Scotia. It was a Newbery Honor recipient in 1944. Fog Magic tells the story of a young girl who, on foggy days, travels back in time to enter the past life of an abandoned village. Lynd Ward illustrated the book, which was published by Viking.

== Plot ==
The fantasy story centers on eleven-year-old Greta Addington. One child in every generation of Addingtons is able to experience the special magic of Blue Cove, Nova Scotia. In fair weather, ruined buildings are all Greta sees, but when the fog rolls in she can travel back in time to visit the village and its inhabitants. While there she has a friend to play with, and the people refer to her as coming "from over the mountain". Greta is especially eager to go there on her twelfth birthday, but she has to wait till night for it to become foggy. That night in Blue Cove her friends give her a kitten, and Greta leaves, realizing she will never be able to return.

The setting is based on Little River, Nova Scotia and the nearby, abandoned coastal settlement of Whites Cove; for many years, Sauer summered in a cabin on the ridge above Little River.

== Themes ==
Fog Magic portrays the mingling of reality and imagination that Sauer considered important for children. According to Twentieth-Century Children's Writers the story shows that Sauer "cares about people, their inner fantasies and their outer behavior. The coexistence of fantasy and reality... is seen most clearly..." Sauer stated plainly that she values both realism and imagination in an article she wrote for the American Library Association called "Making the World Safe for the Janey Larkins". In it she said "The need for modern realism does not negate the need for the classics and imaginative literature. Both are important; both have their place."

Fog Magic is also a coming-of-age story detailing Greta's realization that she is growing up and will no longer be able to visit her friends in the town. Her passage into adulthood on her twelfth birthday is her passage into the "real" world, where the past and present are no longer mingled. As children's literature expert May Hill Arbuthnot said of the ending of Fog Magic, "Maturity lies ahead and reality must be accepted".

== Critical reception ==
Besides winning the Newbery Honor designation, Fog Magic was well received by critics. Horn Book called it "A poignant and distinguished story". According to the Saturday Review, "Miss Sauer's feeling for Nova Scotia and its people gives the past as well as the present warmth and humor and reality…" Sauer's ability to write thoughtfully about nature was also praised by Kirkus Reviews in a starred review, for "books of remarkable merit" wrote that "The magic of woods and sea are in the story, as well as a sympathetic and true understanding of the imaginative child's private world, which is never confused with reality, and which sheds a warmth over the rest of life." .

== See also ==
The Light at Tern Rock, Julia Sauer's other Newbery Honor book.
