= Keeper of the Doves =

- Author: Betsy Byars
- Language: English
- Publication date: 2002

Keeper of the Doves is a 2002 American children's novel by Betsy Byars. Set in turn-of-the-century Kentucky, the novel is written in a series of episodes of first-person narratives about the emerging awareness of a girl, her place in her family and world, and the tremendous power of words for good and bad. Reflecting the narrator's love of words is the fact that each chapter begins with a succeeding letter of the alphabet.

== Plot ==
Amen McBee is born in 1891, the disappointing sixth daughter of a wealthy family; but grows up well-loved and into an awareness of everyone's strengths and weaknesses. Her twin sisters Arabella and Annabella teach her boldness and humour; older sisters Augusta and Abigail inspire more kindness. Her father is stern but loving, her mother loving but frail, and she also lives with her father's cold spinster sister. Amen's maternal grandmother, a progressive spirit bearing gifts of cameras, arrives during her daughter's new pregnancy, which culminates with long-awaited arrival of a son. Amen is also learning of the more secret parts of the family history, especially the death of an infant sister, and the mysterious Mr. Tominski, who might have saved her father's life as a child, but now inspires only fear in the children. He lives as a hermit on their property, caring for trained doves, until a misunderstood word brings tragedy and changes the lives of Amen's family. Amen starts to write poems.

== Reception ==
Publishers Weekly called the novel "jewel-like" and Kirkus Reviews said it has "prose that ripples with clarity and sweetness and an underlying evolution of spirit."
