= Tam Lin =

Scottish border ballad

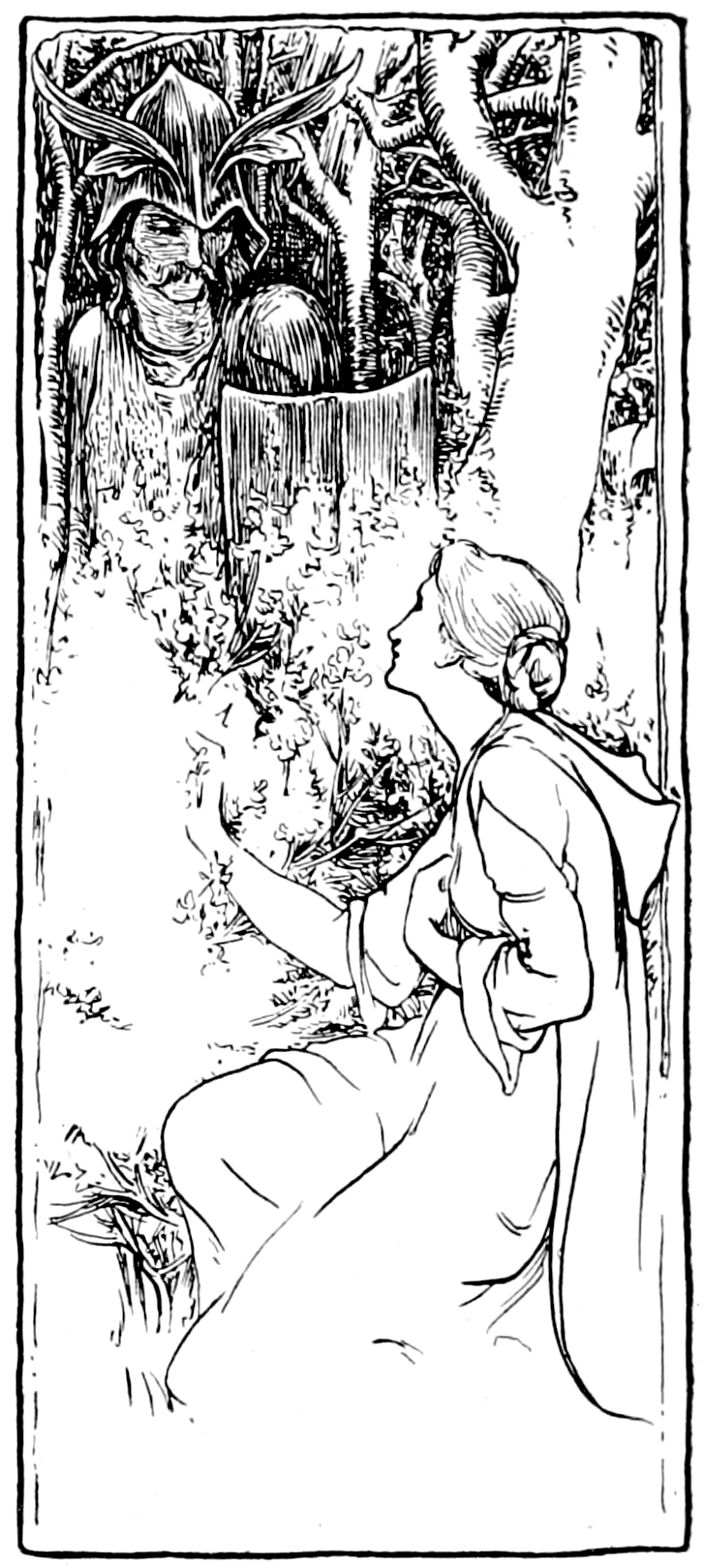
- Illustration by John D. Batten for Tamlane in More English Fairy Tales.
- Author: Anonymous
- Translator: Robert Burns
- Illustrator: John D. Batten
- Cover artist: Pamela Dean
- Language: Classical Scottish
- Series: 1
- Genre: Ballad
- Publisher: Scots Musical Museum
- Publication date: 1796
- Publication place: Scotland
- English publication date: 1796
- Pages: 1

Tam Lin, also known as Tamas-Lin, Tamlane, Tamlene, Tamlin, Tambling, Tomlin, Tam-Lien, Tam-a-Line, Tam-Lyn or Tam-Lane, is a character in the legendary ballad originating from the Scottish Borders.

== History ==
The story of Tam Lin revolves around the rescue of Tam Lin by his true love from the Queen of the Fairies. The motif of winning a person (or subduing an enemy) by holding him through all forms of transformation is found throughout Europe in folktales.

The story has been adapted into numerous stories, songs, and films. It is also associated with a reel of the same name, which is also known as the Glasgow Reel.

Tam Lin is listed as the 39th Child Ballad and number 35 in the Roud Folk Song Index.

=== Synopsis ===
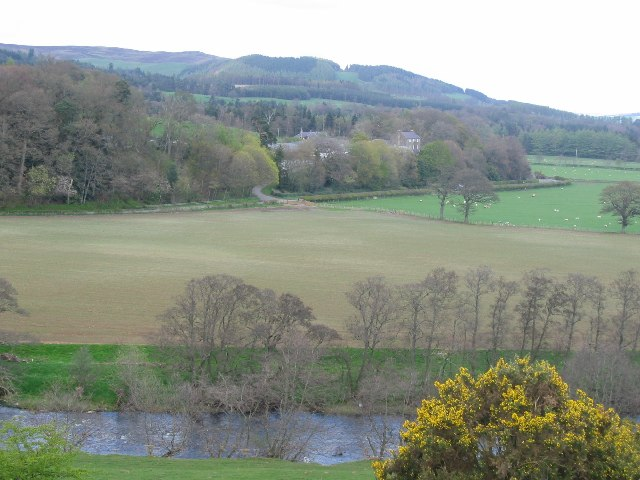
Carterhaugh, near the confluence of the Yarrow Water and the Ettrick Water

Most variants begin with the warning that Tam Lin collects either a possession or the virginity of any maiden who passes through the forest of Carterhaugh. When a young woman, usually called Janet or Margaret, goes to Carterhaugh and plucks a double rose, Tam Lin appears and asks her why she has come without his leave and taken what is his. She states that she owns Carterhaugh because her father has given it to her.

In most variants, Janet then goes home and discovers that she is pregnant; some variants pick up the story at this point. When asked about her condition, she declares that her baby's father is an elf whom she will not forsake. In some versions, she is informed of a herb that will induce abortion; in all the variants, when she returns to Carterhaugh and picks a plant, either the same roses as on her earlier visit or the herb, Tam Lin reappears and challenges her action.

She asks him whether he was ever human, either after that reappearance or, in some versions, immediately after their first meeting resulted in her pregnancy. Tam Lin reveals that, though he was once a mortal man, he was imprisoned in Carterhaugh by the Queen of Faeries after she kidnapped him by catching him when he fell from his horse. He goes on to tell Janet that the fairies give one of their people as a teind (tithe) to Hell at midnight on every seventh Hallowe'en. He asks Janet for her help in freeing him, and receives her agreement; he then instructs her to come to the forest at the time of the tithe, during which he'll be in the company of numerous faerie knights -- he tells her that she'll recognize him by his white horse. Janet must pull him down from his horse, thus making her the one to "catch" him this time, and hold him tightly: he warns her that the fairies will attempt to make her drop him by turning him into all manner of beasts (see Proteus), but states that none of these forms will actually cause her harm. Tam Lin will eventually take the shape of burning coal; when this occurs, Janet is to throw him into a well, whereupon he will reappear as a naked mortal man whom Janet must hide. She does as she is asked and wins her knight; though her success angers the Queen of Faeries, the latter accepts her defeat.

In different variations, Tam Lin is reportedly the grandson of the Laird of Roxburgh, the Laird of Foulis, the Earl of Forbes, or the Earl of Murray. His name also varies between versions (Tam Lin being the most common) as Tom Line, Tomlin, Young Tambling, Tam-a-line and Tamlane.

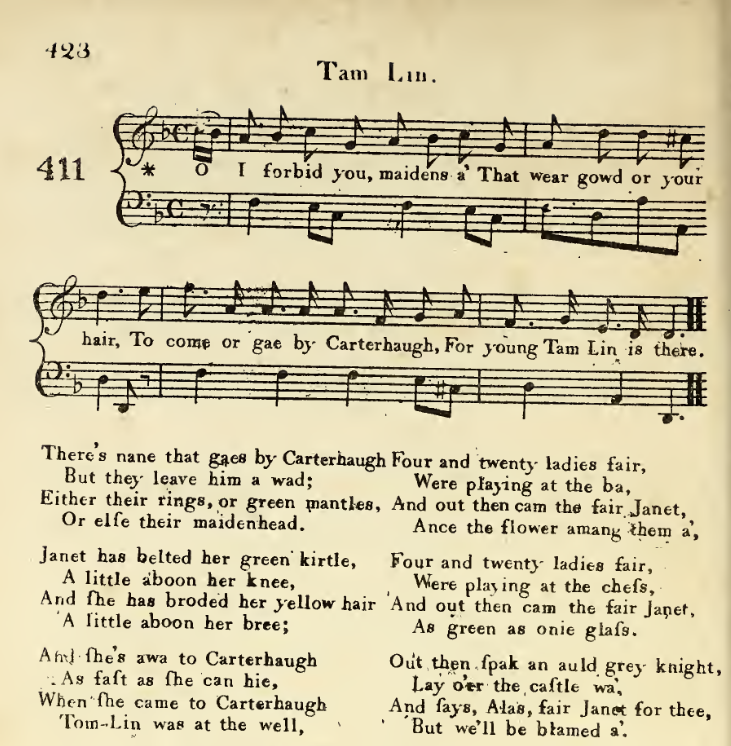
Robert Burns' Tam Lin, printed in James Johnson's Scots Musical Museum (1796).

=== Early versions ===
The ballad dates to at least as early as 1549 (the publication date of The Complaynt of Scotland that mentions "The Tayl of the Ȝong Tamlene" ('The Tale of the Young Tamelene') among a long list of medieval romances). Michael Drayton's narrative poem Nimphidia (1627) includes a character called Tomalin who is a vassal and kinsman of Oberon, King of the Fairies. Robert Burns wrote a version of Tam Lin based on older versions of the ballad, which was printed in James Johnson's Scots Musical Museum (1796).

The story featured in several nineteenth century books of fairy tales under different titles :

- "Elphin Irving, the Fairies' Cupbearer" in Traditional Tales of the English and Scottish Peasantry by Allan Cunningham (1822) (Note: The full text of Elphin Irving, the Fairies' Cupbearer at Wikisource)
- "Wild Robin" in Little Prudy's Fairy Book by Sophie May (1866). (Note: The full text of Wild Robin at Wikisource)
- "Tamlane" in More English Fairy Tales by Joseph Jacobs (1893).

Francis James Child collected fourteen traditional variants in The English and Scottish Popular Ballads in the nineteenth century. (Another Child ballad, Burd Ellen and Young Tamlane, has no connection with this ballad except for the similarity of the heroes' names.)

=== Motifs ===
Child took the threat to take out Tam Lin's eyes as a common folklore precaution against mortals who could see fairies, in the tales of fairy ointment. Joseph Jacobs interpreted it as rather a reversal of the usual practice; the Queen of Faeries would have kept him from seeing the human woman who rescued him.

In some variants, "Hind Etin" has verses identical to this for the first meeting between the hero and the heroine.

== Influences ==
=== Field recordings ===
The ballad has been recorded several times from Scottish and Northern Irish people who learned it in the oral tradition. Eddie Butcher of Magilligan, County Londonderry knew a fragment of the ballad which can be heard via the Irish Traditional Music Archive, and Paddy Tunney of Mollybreen, County Fermanagh sang a version to Hugh Shields in 1968. In Scotland, Duncan Williamson of Auchtermuchty, Fifeshire, William Whyte of Aberdeen and Betsy Johnston of Glasgow all had traditional versions recorded, the latter two by Hamish Henderson.

=== Popular recordings of the ballad ===
Following are some of the notable recordings of the ballad, including their artists, titles, albums, and years:

Artist	Title	Album	Year
Frankie Armstrong	"Tam Lin"	I Heard a Woman Singing	1984
Anne Briggs	"Young Tambling"	Anne Briggs	1971
Blood Ceremony	"The Devil's Widow"	Lord of Misrule	2016
Current 93	"Tamlin"	Tamlin	1994
Daniel Dutton	"Tam Lin"	Twelve Ballads	2006
Fairport Convention	"Tam Lin"	Liege & Lief	1969
Archie Fisher	"Tam Lin"	Big Bend Killing: The Appalachian Ballad Tradition	2017
Bob Hay	"Tam Lin"	Tam Lin and More Songs by Robert Burns	2006
The Imagined Village (Benjamin Zephaniah, Eliza Carthy, et al.)	"Tam Lyn Retold"	The Imagined Village	2007
Bill Jones	"Tale of Tam Lin"	Panchpuran	2001
Alastair McDonald	"Tam Lin"	Heroes & Legends of Scotland	2007
Mediæval Bæbes	"Tam Lin"	Mirabilis	2005
Anaïs Mitchell & Jefferson Hamer	Tam Lin (Child 39)	Child Ballads	2013
Pete Morton	"Tamlyn"	Frivolous Love	1984
Mrs. Ackroyd Band	"Tam Lin"	Gnus & Roses	1995
Ian Page	"Tam Lin"	Folk Music of Scotland	2008
Pentangle	"Tam Lin"	The Time Has Come	2007
Steeleye Span	"Tam Lin"	Tonight's the Night, Live!	1992
Tempest	"Tam Lin"	Serrated Edge	1992
Tricky Pixie (Betsy Tinney, S. J. Tucker, Alexander James Adams)	"Tam Lin"	Mythcreants	2009
Mike Waterson	"Tam Lyn"	For Pence and Spicy Ale (reissue)	1993
Kathleen Yearwood	"Tam Lin"	Book of Hate	1994
Faun	"Tamlin"	Pagan	2022

Benjamin Zephaniah was awarded Best Original Song in the Hancocks 2008, Talkawhile Awards for Folk Music (as voted by members of Talkawhile.co.uk) for Tam Lyn Retold. He collected the award at The Cambridge Folk Festival on 2 August 2008.

=== Popular instrumental recordings ===
Following are some of the notable instrumental recordings, including their artists, titles, albums, and years:

Artist	Title	Album	Year
Davey Arthur (with Three Fingered Jack)	"Tam Lin" (with 2 other reels)	Bigger Than You Think	2010
Séamus Egan	"Tamlin" (with 2 other reels)	In Your Ear	1998
Elephant Revival	"Tam Lin Set"	It's Alive	2012
Tania Elizabeth	"Tam Lynn's"	This Side Up	2000
Fiddler's Green	"Tam Lin"	Wall of Folk	2011
Joe Jewell	"Tam Lin"	Bluebells of Scotland	1997
King Chiaullee	"Tam Lin" (with 3 other reels)	Reel: Ode	2003
Jeremy Kittel	"Tamlin"	Celtic Fiddle	2003
Catriona MacDonald & Ian Lowthian	"Tam Lin" (with 2 other reels)	Opus Blue	1993
Trent Wagler & The Steel Wheels	"Tam Lin"	Blue Heaven	2006

== Adaptations ==
Thomas Canty's cover art for Tam Lin by Pamela Dean

=== Prose ===
- John Myers Myers tells a variant in Silverlock (1949)
- The Armourer's House, by Rosemary Sutcliff (1951) -- includes a telling of the Tam Lin tale, which parallels the novel's theme of a girl struggling to obtain her dreams.
- Scottish Folk-Tales and Legends, by Barbara Ker Wilson (1954)
- Thursday, by Catherine Storr (1971)
- Red Shift, by Alan Garner (1973)
- The Queen of Spells, by Dahlov Ipcar (1973)
- The Perilous Gard, by Elizabeth Marie Pope (1974)
- Fire and Hemlock, by Diana Wynne Jones (1985)
- Tam Lin by Joan D. Vinge, in Imaginary Lands edited by Robin McKinley (1986)
- Nattens demon (translated from Norwegian as Demon of the Night), by Margit Sandemo (1987)
- Tam Lin: An Old Ballad, by Jane Yolen, illustrated by Charles Mikolaycak (1990)
- Hold Me Fast, Don't Let Me Pass, by Alice Munro, in Friend of My Youth (1990)
- Tam Lin by Susan Cooper, illustrated by Warwick Hutton (1991)
- Tam Lin, by Pamela Dean (1991)
- Tam Lin, in the graphic novel series Ballads and Sagas edited by Charles Vess (1995)
- Winter Rose, by Patricia McKillip (1996)
- Never Let Go, by Geraldine McCaughrean, illustrated by Jason Cockcroft (1999)
- Burd Janet, by Jane Yolen, in Not One Damsel in Distress (2000)
- Tam Lin (a version in Scots), by Ian MacFadyen, in The Eildon Tree, Special Double Issue 4-5: Winter 2001, edited by Tom Bryan
- "Cotillion", by Delia Sherman, in Firebirds, edited by Sharyn November (2003)
- The Dogs of Babel (UK edition: Lorelei's Secret), by Carolyn Parkhurst (2003)
- Tithe: A Modern Faerie Tale by Holly Black (2004)
- "He Said, Sidhe Said" by Tanya Huff, in Faerie Tales ed. Russell Davis and Martin H. Greenberg (2004)
- An Earthly Knight, by Janet McNaughton (2005)
- Blood and Iron, by Elizabeth Bear (2006)
- Summer's Lease, by Eluki bes Shahar (Rosemary Edghill)
- "The Lady and the Fox," by Kelly Link, in My True Love Gave to Me, ed. Stephanie Perkins (2014)
- Roses and Rot, by Kat Howard (2016)

=== Theatre ===
- The Thyme of the Season by Duncan Pflaster (incorporates elements and allusions to the story)
- Tamlane by Edwin Stiven

=== Film ===
- Tam Lin (1970 movie) directed by Roddy McDowall, and starring Ava Gardner.
- Tam Lin (1982 short film) directed by Michael Korolenko but never distributed.
- An Old Ballad (1988 animated film) directed by Valentyna Kostyleva, Kyїvnaukfilm.

=== Novels ===
- In Carolyn Parkhurst's novel The Dogs of Babel (also known as Lorelei's Secret in the UK), a section of Tam Lin plays a pivotal role in the story. In it the narrator, Paul Iverson, discovers that his recently deceased wife left an encrypted message to him in their bookshelf, quoting Tam Lin.
- The multi-faceted novel Red Shift by Alan Garner can be read as a subtle reworking of the ballad.
- In the fantasy novel The Battle of Evernight by Cecilia Dart-Thornton, the story of Tam Lin is told as the story of Tamlain Conmor.
- Tamlin appears in the fantasy novel Rumors of Spring by Richard Grant.
- In Jim Butcher's novel Cold Days, Tam Lin is referenced as a former Knight of the Winter Court.
- A Court of Thorns and Roses by Sarah J. Maas (2015) has a fairy character named Tamlin whom the protagonist saves from an evil fairy queen, though the novel's plot resembles Beauty and the Beast.

=== Comic books ===
- Tam-Lin, a closet drama written by Elaine Lee and illustrated by Charles Vess, appears in The Book of Ballads and Sagas, Vess's collection of adaptations of traditional songs, mostly into comics form.
- In the Vertigo comic book, Fables, Tam Lin died in the defence of the last stronghold of the Fables against the forces of the Adversary. He is claimed to be the knight loved by the queen of the faeries, who had a reputation of a scoundrel, but gave up his chance of freedom to his page.
- In the Vertigo comic book series, The Sandman by Neil Gaiman, the notion that Faerie pays a sacrificial tithe to Hell is mentioned in the storyline "Season of Mists".
- In the Vertigo comic book series The Books of Magic, The Names of Magic, and The Books of Faerie, Tamlin is the father of the protagonist Timothy Hunter, potentially the greatest sorcerer in the world. In The Books of Faerie: The Widow's Tale, the story of Tamlin's romance with Queen Titania of Faerie is revealed.

=== Other ===
- In the mobile game Fate/Grand Order, Tam Lin are used to refer to Fairy Knights in the English Translation of the game.
- In the Shin Megami Tensei series of video games, Tam Lin is a recurring demon that can often be recruited relatively early and is one of the very few demons whose design share an exact model with another demon – its brother model being another northern European mythological hero, Cu Chulainn.
- This ballad was one of 25 traditional works included in Ballads Weird and Wonderful (1912) and illustrated by Vernon Hill.
- The Rose, The Knight, and The Faery Host are paintings by Stephanie Pui-Mun Law depicting various parts of the Tam Lin legend.
- The Choose Your Own Adventure book Enchanted Kingdom has an ending in which the reader/player's character is rescued from the fairies by a girl whom the character has befriended, who has to hold onto the character through three transformations.
  - Seanan McGuire' An Artifical Night draw in the scottish ballad of 'Tam lin'.
- Alastair White's fashion-opera WOAD adapts the ballad to explore the implications of multiverse theory.
- An animated adaptation was originally meant to be one of Sony Pictures Animation's starter line-up of films in the works, but for unknown reasons, the film never saw the light of day.

== See also ==
- Barbara Allen
- Gil Brenton
- List of the Child Ballads
- The Sprig of Rosemary
- Thomas the Rhymer
