= Winter Rose (novel) =

1996 novel by Patricia A. McKillip

- First edition cover
- Author: Patricia A. McKillip
- Cover artist: Kinuko Y. Craft
- Language: English
- Genre: Fantasy
- Publisher: Ace Books
- Publication date: July 1, 1996
- Publication place: United States
- Media type: Print
- Pages: 262
- ISBN: 0-441-00334-6
- OCLC: 33333954
- Dewey Decimal: 813/.54 20
- LC Class: PS3563.C3812 W56 1996
- Followed by: Solstice Wood

Winter Rose is a 1996 fantasy novel by American writer Patricia A. McKillip. It was nominated for the 1996 Nebula Award and 1997 Locus Award for Best Fantasy Novel, and was a finalist for the 1997 Mythopoeic Fantasy Award for Adult Literature. In 2006, McKillip published its sequel, Solstice Wood.

== Plot summary ==
When Rois Melior, the wild daughter of a widowed father, first sees Corbet Lynn step from the woods, she is attracted to him despite a sense that he is not what he appears to be. As he rebuilds his family's decaying estate, Rois and her sister Laurel both befriend and eventually fall in love with Corbet. The seasons progress as calm, sensible Laurel begins to change, forgetting her earlier betrothal and becoming obsessed with Corbet.

In the winter, Corbet mysteriously disappears and Laurel begins to waste away, much as her mother did. The town believes that the curse that Corbet's grandfather laid upon his descendants has claimed him.Only Rois, who has been able to slip in and out of the woods since she was a child, is able to chase after Corbet and save him and her sister. But the power of the fey is a tricky magic, and even as Rois untangles him from his past, she is in constant danger of being ensnared herself.

== Nominations ==
- 1997 Mythopoeic Fantasy Award for Adult Literature finalist
- 1997 Locus Award for Best Fantasy Novel
- 1996 Nebula Award

== See also ==
- Tam Lin
- Elfland
