= Elizabeth Marie Pope =

American writer

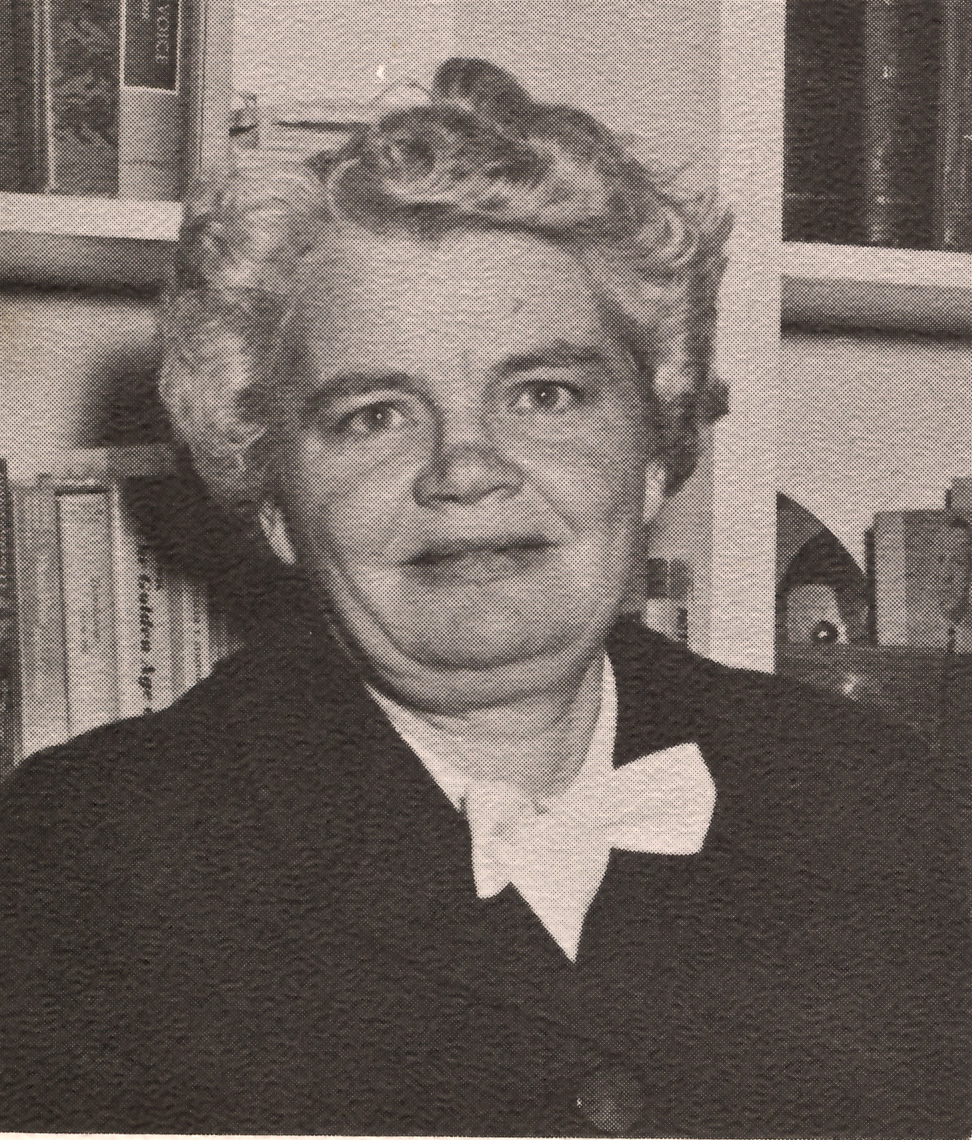
- Pope in 1965
- Born: May 1, 1917; Washington, DC, USA
- Died: August 4, 1992 (aged 75); Biddeford, Maine, USA
- Education: PhD Johns Hopkins University
- Alma mater: Bryn Mawr College
- Occupations: Academic, writer
- Writing career
- Genre: Young adult historical fiction
- Subject: English literature
- Notable works: The Sherwood Ring; The Perilous Gard
- Notable awards: Newbery Honor

Elizabeth Marie Pope (1917–1992) was an American author and educator specializing in Elizabethan England and the works of John Milton and William Shakespeare. She received the Newbery Honor.

== Early life and education ==
Elizabeth Marie Pope was born on May 1, 1917 in Washington, D.C., to Christopher Herman Pope, a banker, and Florence Anna Thompson Pope. She had two younger siblings, Wilmot T. Pope and Mary Frances Pope.

Elizabeth Pope received her B.A. from Bryn Mawr College in 1940. She completed graduate studies at Johns Hopkins University, where in 1944 she was awarded a Ph.D.

== Career ==
In the fall of 1944, she accepted a teaching position at Mills College in Oakland, CA. She served as assistant professor until 1955, when she was promoted to associate professor. In 1962 she became professor of English and was soon Head of the Department of English. She taught English at Mills for thirty-eight years before retiring on June 30, 1982.

=== Classroom teaching ===
Elaine B. Johnson, in her book Contextual Teaching and Learning, fondly describes her memories of studying Shakespeare and Milton with Dr. Pope (pages 50–51). Johnson recalls a teacher who was courteous, humorous, compassionate, lively, and excellent at drawing connections between her students' lives and the moral lessons of Shakespeare and Milton. Johnson also includes the comment that Dr. Pope was "weighed down by a heavy brace on one leg" and was white-haired, indicating that she took courses from Dr. Pope toward the end of her tenure as professor. For Johnson, Dr. Pope was not only an engaging lecturer, but facilitated class discussion with open-ended questions and interest in her students' comments.

=== Interest in mythology ===
For many years Elizabeth Pope taught a course on Basic Myths. In response to an invitation to speak at the annual Mills College Alumnae Association meeting in 1958, Elizabeth Pope elaborated the topic of "Mythology and the Modern Mind."

The fact is that on the mythological level modern man has actually achieved what he is only beginning to dream of on the political level – – a real coming together of races and nations. Perhaps we should not make too much of this phenomenon – – but there is no need to underestimate it either. In the past hundred years, the resources of our imaginative life have been enormously broadened, deepened, strengthened, and enriched; it is a great achievement, and one of which the modern mind may legitimately be proud.

Pope proceeded to discuss four distinct approaches to origins of mythology. The first is the "historical-archaeological" approach, that myth "is a distorted and fantastic version of something that actually happened." The second approach is "psychological", presenting "in symbolic form the unconscious desires and loathings which lie buried deepest in the most hidden recesses of the psyche." Third is the "anthropological theory," emphasizing "phases of the agricultural year and the important stages of human development (birth, coming-of-age, marriage, death) "marked by elaborate ceremonials and rites by means of which the whole community participates in the occasion," and where a ceremony may linger on "even when the participants no longer understand exactly what it means." Fourth is "analytic study", viewed as more scientific. These scholars "break the story down into its component parts and classify them according to type — or... 'motif.'" Pope concluded with a probing question: "we have always known that the modern mind is capable of scientific study: is it also capable of the sort of creative imagination that produced myths in the first place?"

=== Author ===
Her Newbery Honor-winning novel for young adults, The Perilous Gard, is an imaginative retelling of the ballad of Tam Lin set in the latter days of Queen Mary I of England and the early days of Queen Elizabeth I, featuring a strong, independent, clever young heroine, Kate. It also sympathetically discusses remnants of ancient pagan Britain driven into hiding by the coming of Christianity. Many of its themes will be familiar from the Arthurian legends, which are referred to at the opening of the novel.

She also wrote The Sherwood Ring, published by Puffin Books in 1958. ISBN 0-14-034911-1

== Affiliations ==
She held memberships in the American Association of University Professors, the Renaissance Society, the Mediaeval Society of America, and the Society for Creative Anachronism.

== Bibliography ==
=== Novels ===
- The Sherwood Ring, 1958
- The Perilous Gard, 1974

=== Non-fiction ===
- Paradise Regained: The Tradition and the Poem, 1947
