= Carolyn Parkhurst =

American author (born 1971)

- Born: January 18, 1971 (age 55); Manchester, New Hampshire
- Writing career
- Genre: Fiction

Carolyn Parkhurst (born January 18, 1971, Manchester, New Hampshire) is an American author who has published five books. Her first, the 2003 best-seller The Dogs of Babel also known as Lorelei's Secret in the UK, was a New York Times Notable Book and on The New York Times Best Seller list.

She followed that effort with The New York Times bestselling Lost and Found in June 2006 and The Nobodies Album in June 2010. Her first children's book, written with Dan Yaccarino, Cooking with Henry and Elliebelly, was released in Fall, 2010. Parkhurst's novel Harmony was published in 2016 by Pamela Dorman / Viking.

Parkhurst says she wrote her first story at age three by dictating The Table Family to her mother. An only child, she grew up in Waltham, Massachusetts; her parents separated when she was two years old. Parkhurst spent so much time reading as a child, she had to be sent outside to play. She attended Belmont Day School and the Winsor School in Boston. Her first story in print was for a Halloween contest by a local newspaper.

Her first job in publishing came at age 15, writing record reviews for Star Hits magazine. Parkhurst received her B.A. degree from Wesleyan University and an M.F.A. in creative writing from American University. Married since 1998 and the mother of two children, she currently lives in Washington, D.C.
