= Newark Castle, Selkirkshire =

Tower house in Selkirkshire, Scottish Borders, Scotland

Coordinates: 55.554800°N 2.919691°W

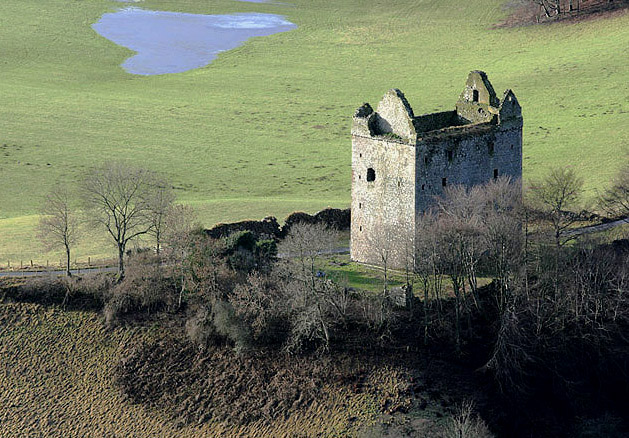
Newark Tower ruins

Newark Tower is a large, ruined tower house standing in the grounds of Bowhill House, in the valley of the Yarrow Water three miles west of Selkirk in the Scottish Borders. In addition to the keep, sections of a gatehouse and wall survive. It has been designated a scheduled monument by Historic Environment Scotland.

== History ==
Around 1406 Archibald Douglas, the 4th Earl of Douglas, Duke of Touraine, moved his principal residence in the Selkirk Forest from Edibertshiels to a prominence a kilometre to the west. This became known as the New Wark (castle) while the old site decayed and became known as Auld Wark.

Forest courts were held at Newark twice yearly at the festivals of Beltane (1 May) and All Hallows (1 November) where justice, for crimes such as illegal hunting and deforestation, was served. John Turnbull was installed as the first keeper of Newark Castle.

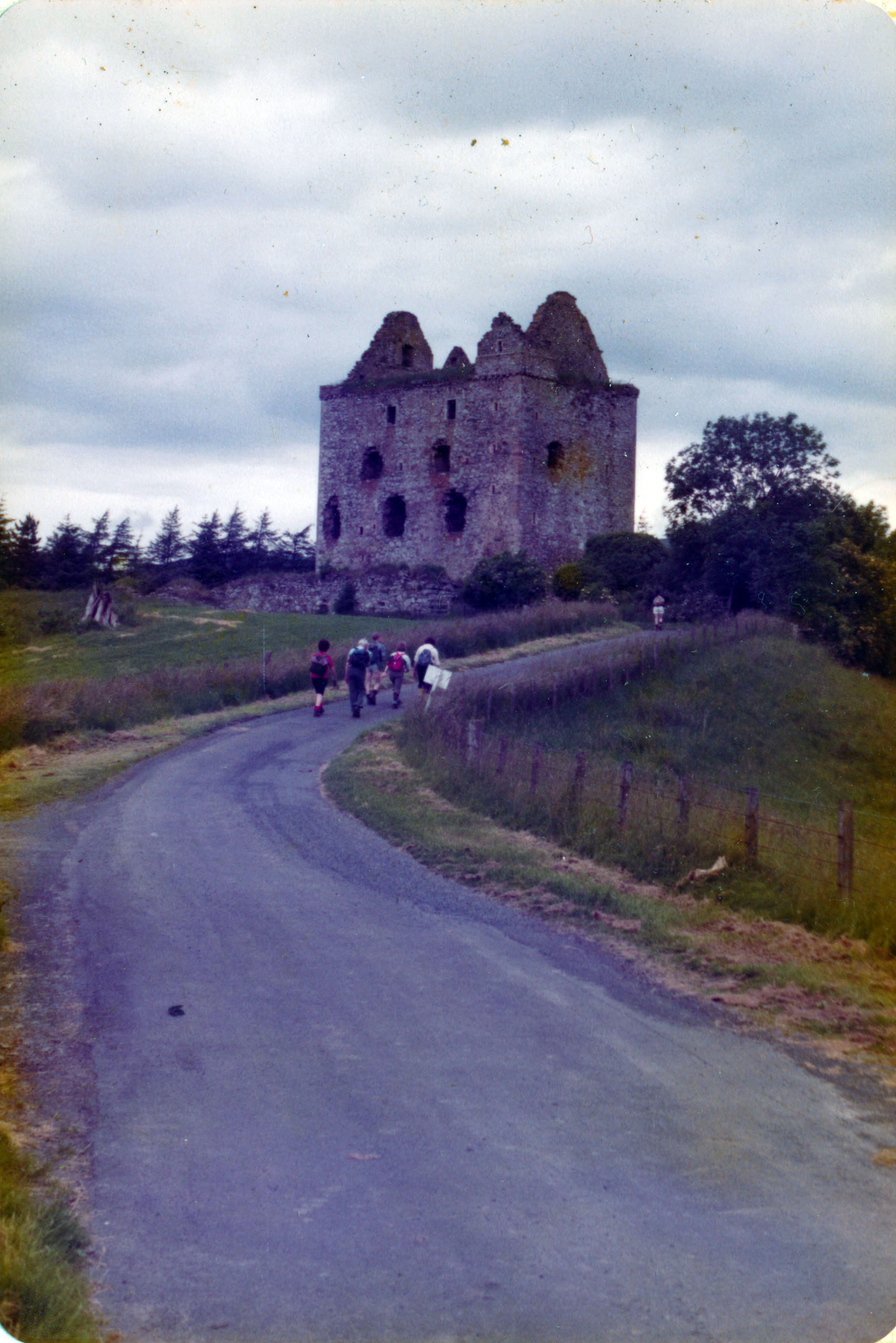
Newark castle near Selkirk in the Scottish borders

After the fall of the Black Douglases in 1455 the Tower was held by the crown. The exchequer rolls include payments for repairs, and in the 1460s Thomas Joffrey was master of the castle's fabric. In 1473 it was given to Margaret of Denmark, wife of James III. The royal arms are visible on the west gable. The castle became the administrative centre of the Royal Forest of Ettrick, and the seven-storey tower house was built in these years. Alexander, Lord Home, was keeper of the castle and forest from 1490.

Margaret Tudor, wife of James IV and mother of James V, was given the tower of Newark with the lands and lordship of Ettrick forest as part of her marriage gift on 1 June 1503. She came to Newark in June 1532 to keep the Forest Court of Ettrick. The Laird of Buccleuch refused to give her the keys, until James V who was hunting at Cramalt in Meggotland sent confirmation. Margaret gave the keys to her husband Lord Methven.

Newark was unsuccessfully besieged by an English army in 1547, but was burnt the following year. Regent Arran stayed at Newark from 30 September to 4 October 1548. Sir Walter Scott of Branxholme was made Keeper and Captain of Newark, and Baillie and Chamberlain of Ettrick Forest in December 1573.

In 1645, during the Wars of the Three Kingdoms, 100 royalist followers of the Marquis of Montrose were shot in the barmkin of Newark after the Battle of Philiphaugh. The Tower is believed to be haunted by the souls of the 300 slaughtered women and children also murdered at the site after the battle, whose cries are heard each year on 13 September.

The Tower was altered for Anne Scott, 1st Duchess of Buccleuch at the end of the 17th century. It was visited by Sir Walter Scott and William and Dorothy Wordsworth in 1831.

Walter Scott framed the story of The Lay of the Last Minstrel there.

== See also ==
- Treasure Houses of Britain – 1985 TV series that shows the castle as backdrop to introduction of Buccleuch family in Programme 2

== Bibliography ==
- Coventry, Martin (2005). towers of Scotland. Goblinshead. p. 88. ISBN 1-899874-24-0.
- Salter, Mike (1985). Discovering Scottish towers. Shire Publications Ltd. pp. 12–13. ISBN 0-85263-749-7.
