= Betsy Byars =

American children's books author (1928–2020)

- Born: Betsy Cromer; August 7, 1928; Charlotte, North Carolina, U.S.
- Died: February 26, 2020 (aged 91); Seneca, South Carolina, U.S.
- Education: Furman University; Queens College
- Occupations: Children's author, novelist, freelance writer
- Writing career
- Period: 1962–2010
- Genres: Children's fiction, Young adult fiction, Historical fiction, Realistic fiction
- Notable works: Summer of the Swans; The Night Swimmers
- Notable awards: Newbery Medal; 1971; National Book Award; 1981
- Website: betsybyars.com

Betsy Byars (born Cromer; August 7, 1928 – February 26, 2020) was an American author of children's books. Her novel Summer of the Swans won the 1971 Newbery Medal. She has also received a National Book Award for Young People's Literature for The Night Swimmers (1980) and an Edgar Award for Wanted... Mud Blossom (1991).

Byars has been called "one of the ten best writers for children in the world" by Nancy Chambers, editor of the British literary journal Signal, and in 1987 Byars received the Regina Medal for lifetime achievement from the Catholic Library Association. Due to the popularity of her books with children, she was listed as one of the Educational Paperback Association's top 100 authors.

== Biography ==
Betsy Cromer Byars was born August 7, 1928, in Charlotte, North Carolina to George Guy, a cotton mill executive, and Nan (née Rugheimer) Cromer, a homemaker. Her childhood was spent during the Great Depression. She attended Furman University in Greenville, South Carolina, from 1946 to 1948, before transferring to Queens College in Charlotte, where she graduated in 1950 with a bachelor's degree in English.

After graduating, Cromer met Edward Ford Byars, a graduate student in engineering at Clemson University, and they married on June 24, 1950. They had three daughters and a son between 1951 and 1958: Laurie, Betsy Ann, Nan, and Guy. In 1956, the family moved from Clemson, South Carolina, to Urbana, Illinois, where Edward pursued further graduate work at the University of Illinois Urbana-Champaign, eventually becoming a professor of engineering at West Virginia University in 1960. While her husband was busy during the day with his studies, Betsy began writing for magazines. Her work was eventually featured in The Saturday Evening Post, Look, Everywoman's Magazine, and TV Guide. Her first novel, Clementine, was published in 1962. Betsy and Ed Byars are both licensed aircraft pilots and lived on an airstrip in Seneca, South Carolina, the bottom floor of their house being a hangar.

Daughters Betsy Duffey and Laurie Myers are also children's writers.

Byars moved back to Seneca in 1980 and retired in 1990. She died in Seneca on February 26, 2020.

== Works ==
- 1962 Clementine
- 1965 The Dancing Camel
- 1966 Rama, the Gypsy Cat
- 1967 The Groober
- 1968 The Midnight Fox
- 1970 Summer of the Swans
- 1971 Go and Hush the Baby
- 1972 The House of Wings
- 1973 The Eighteenth Emergency —winner of the Dorothy Canfield Fisher Children's Book Award
- 1974 After the Goat Man
- 1975 The Lace Snail
- 1976 The TV Kid
- 1977 The Pinballs
- 1978 The Cartoonist
- 1978 The Winged Colt of Casa Mia
- 1979 Good-bye, Chicken Little
- 1979 Trouble River
- 1980 The Night Swimmers —National Book Award, Children's Fiction
- 1981 The Cybil War
- 1982 The Animal, The Vegetable, and John D. Jones
- 1982 The Two-Thousand-Pound Goldfish
- 1983 The Glory Girl
- 1984 The Computer Nut
- 1985 Cracker Jackson ISBN 978-0-8050-8817-5
- 1991 The Seven Treasure Hunts
- 1992 Coast to Coast
- 1993 McMummy
- 1995 Growing Up Stories
- 1996 The Joy Boys
- 1996 Tornado (illustrated by Doron Ben-Ami)
- 2000 Me Tarzan
- 2002 Keeper of the Doves
- 2004 Top Teen Stories (contribution)

=== Series ===
Ant

- 1996 My Brother, Ant
- 1997 Ant Plays Bear

Bingo Brown

- 1988 The Burning Questions of Bingo Brown
- 1991 Bingo Brown and the Language of Love
- 1992 Bingo Brown, Gypsy Lover
- 1992 Bingo Brown's Guide to Romance

Boo

- 2006 Boo's Dinosaur
- 2009 Boo's Surprise

Blossom Family

- 1986 The Not-Just-Anybody Family
- 1986 The Blossoms Meet the Vulture Lady
- 1987 The Blossoms and the Green Phantom
- 1987 A Blossom Promise
- 1991 Wanted...Mud Blossom

Golly Sisters

- 1985 The Golly Sisters Go West
- 1990 Hooray for the Golly Sisters
- 1994 The Golly Sisters Ride Again

Herculeah Jones

- 1994 The Dark Stairs
- 1995 Tarot Says Beware
- 1996 Dead Letter
- 1997 Death's Door
- 1998 Disappearing Acts
- 2006 King of Murder
- 2006 The Black Tower

=== Collaborations with daughters Betsy Duffey and Laurie Myers ===
- 2000 My Dog, My Hero
- 2004 The SOS File
- 2007 Dog Diaries
- 2010 Cat Diaries

=== Memoir ===
- 1991 The Moon and I

=== Short stories ===
- Look Back at the Sea
