= 1001 Children's Books You Must Read Before You Grow Up =

Book by Julia Eccleshare

- Author: Julia Eccleshare
- Language: English
- Genre: Non-fiction
- Published: 2009 (Universe/Rizzoli International)
- Publication place: United Kingdom
- Media type: Print (Hardcover)
- Pages: 960
- ISBN: 978-0-7333-2562-5
- Dewey Decimal: 011.62 22
- LC Class: Z1037 .A255 2009

1001 Children's Books You Must Read Before You Grow Up is a literary reference book compiled by Julia Eccleshare, children's book editor at British newspaper The Guardian. It was published in 2009 by Universe/Rizzoli International.

== Contents ==
Noted for listing a variety of international works, 1001 Children's Books You Must Read Before You Grow Up features stories originally written in a multitude of languages, which includes Japanese, Slovak, Italian, Chinese, Swedish, Russian and Dutch. Among the commentaries, there are reviews from notable figures such as Wayne Mills and Lorraine Orman, as well as some by famous children's writers such as Michael Morpurgo, Judy Blume, Lois Lowry, Jamila Gavin, Philip Pullman and 25 others. These appear in a different style from the other reviews by contributors. Along with the reviews, there are short excerpts from some of the works, which appear in bold alongside the review. Each listing includes a summary with information on the author as well; each picture book title is accompanied by colourful illustrations. Some of the genres included are fantasy, adventure, history, contemporary life, and others. It appears in hardcover, with 960 pages and weighs roughly 2.2 pounds (1.00 kg). 1001 Children's Books contains preface by children's illustrator and fiction writer Quentin Blake and introduction by editor Julia Eccleshare. There is an index of titles, arranged alphabetically, and an index by author/illustrator, arranged alphabetically by surname. Listings are organized primarily by reading level: age ranges 0–3, 3+, 5+, 8+ and 12+.

== Complete list from 2nd edition (2010) ==
English title	Original title	Author	Illustrator	Language	Year	Age
The Little Engine That Could		Watty Piper	Lois Lenski	English	1930	0–3
Pat the Bunny		Dorothy Kunhardt		English	1940	0–3
Make Way for Ducklings		Robert McCloskey		English	1941	0–3
The Runaway Bunny		Margaret Wise Brown	Clement Hurd	English	1942	0–3
The Three Railway Engines		Reverend W. Awdry	William Middleton	English	1945	0–3
Thomas the Tank Engine		Reverend W. Awdry	Reginald Payne	English	1946	0–3
Goodnight Moon		Margaret Wise Brown	Clement Hurd	English	1947	0–3
Lavender's Blue		Kathleen Lines	Harold Jones	English	1954	0–3
Bedtime for Frances		Russell Hoban	Garth Williams	English	1960	0–3
Miffy	Nijntje	Dick Bruna		Dutch	1963	0–3
Rosie's Walk		Pat Hutchins		English	1968	0–3
The Elephant and the Bad Baby		Elfrida Vipont	Raymond Briggs	English	1969	0–3
The Very Hungry Caterpillar		Eric Carle		English	1969	0–3
Mr. Gumpy's Outing		John Burningham		English	1970	0–3
Meg and Mog		Helen Nicoll	Jan Pieńkowski	English	1972	0–3
Good Night, Alfie Atkins	God natt Alfons Åberg	Gunilla Bergström		Swedish	1972	0–3
Little Brown Bear	Petit ours brun	Claude Lebrun	Danièle Bour	French	1975	0–3
Little Spook's Baby Sister	Lilla spöket Laban får en lillasyster	Inger Sandberg	Lasse Sandberg	Swedish	1977	0–3
Fly, Little Bird	Vola, uccellino!	Francesco Tullio Altan		Italian	1977	0–3
Each Peach Pear Plum		Allan Ahlberg	Janet Ahlberg	English	1978	0–3
Where's Spot?		Eric Hill		English	1980	0–3
The Baby's Catalogue		Allan Ahlberg	Janet Ahlberg	English	1982	0–3
Dear Zoo		Rod Campbell		English	1982	0–3
Good Dog, Carl		Alexandra Day		English	1985	0–3
Bathwater's Hot		Shirley Hughes		English	1985	0–3
Tickle, Tickle		Helen Oxenbury		English	1987	0–3
Elmer		David McKee		English	1989	0–3
We're Going on a Bear Hunt		Michael Rosen	Helen Oxenbury	English	1989	0–3
Bunny Bath	Kanin-bad	Lena Anderson		Swedish	1990	0–3
Kipper		Mick Inkpen		English	1991	0–3
Maisy Goes to Playschool		Lucy Cousins		English	1992	0–3
Owl Babies		Martin Waddell	Patrick Benson	English	1992	0–3
Handa's Surprise		Eileen Browne		English	1994	0–3
Alvin Says Good Night	Albin säger godnatt	Ulf Löfgren		Swedish	1996	0–3
The Bear Went Over the Mountain		John Prater		English	1999	0–3
Humphrey's Corner		Sally Hunter		English	1999	0–3
Julian the Rabbit	Giulio coniglio: storie per un anno	Nicoletta Costa		Italian	2001	0–3
The Quangle Wangle's Hat		Edward Lear		English	1876	3+
Mother Goose		Kate Greenaway		English	1881	3+
Marigold Garden		Kate Greenaway		English	1885	3+
The Jolly Aunt	Die lustige Tante	Lothar Meggendorfer		German	1891	3+
Peter in Blueberry Land	Puttes äventyr i blåbärsskogen	Elsa Beskow		Swedish	1901	3+
The Tale of Peter Rabbit		Beatrix Potter		English	1902	3+
The Tale of Mr. Jeremy Fisher		Beatrix Potter		English	1906	3+
The Story of the Root Children	Etwas von den Wurzelkindern	Sibylle von Olfers		German	1906	3+
The Tale of Jemima Puddle-Duck		Beatrix Potter		English	1908	3+
The Children of the Forest	Tomtebobarnen	Elsa Beskow		Swedish	1910	3+
Clever Bill		William Nicholson		English	1926	3+
Winnie-the-Pooh		A. A. Milne	Ernest Shepard	English	1926	3+
The Story of Babar	Histoire de Babar le petit éléphant	Jean de Brunhoff		French	1931	3+
The Story About Ping		Marjorie Flack	Kurt Wiese	English	1933	3+
Blinky Bill		Dorothy Wall		English	1933	3+
The Story of Ferdinand		Munro Leaf	Robert Lawson	English	1936	3+
Orlando		Kathleen Hale		English	1938	3+
Little Toot		Hardie Gramatky		English	1939	3+
Madeline		Ludwig Bemelmans		English	1939	3+
Mike Mulligan		Virginia Lee Burton		English	1939	3+
Curious George		Margret Rey	H. A. Rey	English	1941	3+
The Little House		Virginia Lee Burton		English	1942	3+
The Little Red Lighthouse		Hildegarde Swift	Lynd Ward	English	1942	3+
Moomin, Mymble and Little My	Hur gick det sen? Boken om Mymlan, Mumintrollet och lilla My	Tove Jansson		Swedish	1952	3+
My Naughty Little Sister		Dorothy Edwards	Henrietta Garland	English	1952	3+
Martine	Martine à la ferme	Gilbert Delahaye	Marcel Marlier	French	1954	3+
Eloise		Kay Thompson	Hilary Knight	English	1955	3+
Harry the Dirty Dog		Gene Zion	Margaret Bloy Graham	English	1956	3+
The Cat in the Hat		Dr. Seuss		English	1957	3+
The Cow Who Fell in the Canal		Phyllis Krasilovsky	Peter Spier	English	1957	3+
A Bear Called Paddington		Michael Bond	Peggy Fortnum	English	1958	3+
Little Blue and Little Yellow		Leo Lionni		English	1959	3+
Green Eggs and Ham		Dr. Seuss		English	1960	3+
Go, Dog. Go!		P. D. Eastman		English	1961	3+
The Berenstain Bears		Stan Berenstain and Jan Berenstain		English	1962	3+
Ivor the Engine		Oliver Postgate	Peter Firmin	English	1962	3+
Clifford the Big Red Dog		Norman Bridwell		English	1963	3+
Where the Wild Things Are		Maurice Sendak		English	1963	3+
Lyle, Lyle, Crocodile		Bernard Waber		English	1965	3+
Brown Bear, Brown Bear, What Do You See?		Bill Martin, Jr.	Eric Carle	English	1967	3+
What Does the Mouse Think on Thursday?	Was denkt die Maus am Donnerstag?	Josef Guggenmos	Günther Stiller	German	1967	3+
What Do People Do All Day?		Richard Scarry		English	1968	3+
Corduroy		Don Freeman		English	1968	3+
The Wonderful Tree	Det underbara trädet	Ulf Löfgren		Swedish	1969	3+
In the Night Kitchen		Maurice Sendak		English	1970	3+
Barbapapa	Barbapapa	Talus Taylor and Annette Tison		French	1970	3+
Mr. Tickle		Roger Hargreaves		English	1971	3+
Lotta's Bike	Visst kan Lotta cykla	Astrid Lindgren	Ilon Wikland	Swedish	1971	3+
Little I Am I	Das kleine Ich-bin-ich	Mira Lobe	Susi Weigel	German	1972	3+
The Church Mouse		Graham Oakley		English	1972	3+
The Sea-Thing Child		Russell Hoban	Abrom Hoban	English	1972	3+
Father Christmas		Raymond Briggs		English	1973	3+
My Cat Likes to Hide in Boxes		Eve Sutton	Lynley Dodd	English	1973	3+
Who's Seen the Scissors?	¿Quién ha visto las tijeras?	Fernando Krahn		Spanish	1975	3+
Morris's Disappearing Bag		Rosemary Wells		English	1975	3+
Uppo the Bear	Uppo-Nalle	Elina Karjalainen	Hannu Taina	Finnish	1977	3+
Burglar Bill		Allan Ahlberg	Janet Ahlberg	English	1977	3+
Dogger		Shirley Hughes		English	1977	3+
Up in the Tree		Margaret Atwood		English	1978	3+
The Snowman		Raymond Briggs		English	1978	3+
Freight Train		Donald Crews		English	1978	3+
Is That a Monster, Alfie Atkins?	Alfons och odjuret	Gunilla Bergström		Swedish	1978	3+
Ox-Cart Man		Donald Hall	Barbara Cooney	English	1979	3+
Mister Magnolia		Quentin Blake		English	1980	3+
Peace at Last		Jill Murphy		English	1980	3+
Mr. Archimedes' Bath		Pamela Allen		English	1980	3+
Léo and Popi	Léo et Popi	Marie-Agnès Gaudrat	Helen Oxenbury	French	1980	3+
Postman Pat's Treasure Hunt		John Arthur Cunliffe	Celia Berridge	English	1981	3+
Ernest and Celestine Have Lost Simon	Ernest et Célestine ont perdu Siméon	Gabrielle Vincent		French	1981	3+
Alfie Gets In First		Shirley Hughes		English	1981	3+
One Woolly Wombat		Rod Trinca	Kerry Argent	English	1982	3+
Avocado Baby		John Burningham		English	1982	3+
Gorilla		Anthony Browne		English	1983	3+
Angelina Ballerina		Katharine Holabird	Helen Craig	English	1983	3+
Dusty Wants to Help	Hjälpa till, sa Pulvret	Inger Sandberg	Lasse Sandberg	Swedish	1983	3+
We Are the Triplets	Som les tres bessones	Roser Capdevila		Spanish	1983	3+
Hairy Maclary from Donaldson's Dairy		Lynley Dodd		English	1983	3+
Possum Magic		Mem Fox	Julie Vivas	English	1983	3+
Felix and Alexander		Terry Denton		English	1985	3+
Pancakes for Findus	Pannkakstårtan	Sven Nordqvist		Swedish	1985	3+
Love You Forever		Robert Munsch	Sheila McGraw	English	1986	3+
This Is the Bear		Sarah Hayes	Helen Craig	English	1986	3+
Old Bear		Jane Hissey		English	1986	3+
Owl Moon		Jane Yolen	John Schoenherr	English	1987	3+
Winnie the Witch		Valerie Thomas	Korky Paul	English	1987	3+
Can't You Sleep, Little Bear?		Martin Waddell	Barbara Firth	English	1988	3+
Crocodile Beat		Gail Jorgensen	Patricia Mullins	English	1988	3+
Stina	Storm-Stina	Lena Anderson		Swedish	1988	3+
Fire-Engine Lil		Janet McLean	Andrew McLean	English	1989	3+
One Snowy Night		Nick Butterworth		English	1989	3+
The Mousehole Cat		Antonia Barber	Nicola Bayley	English	1990	3+
Amazing Grace		Mary Hoffman	Caroline Binch	English	1991	3+
Window		Jeannie Baker		English	1991	3+
Slinky Malinki		Lynley Dodd		English	1991	3+
T'choupi	T'choupi	Thierry Courtin		French	1992	3+
Frog in Winter	Kikker in de kou	Max Velthuijs		Dutch	1992	3+
Where's My Teddy?		Jez Alborough		English	1992	3+
Okilélé	Okilélé	Claude Ponti		French	1993	3+
Sleep Well, Little Bear	Schlaf gut, kleiner Bär	Quint Buchholz		German	1993	3+
Poems for the Very Young		Michael Rosen	Bob Graham	English	1993	3+
Guess How Much I Love You		Sam McBratney	Anita Jeram	English	1994	3+
The Story of the Little Mole	Vom kleinen Maulwurf, der wissen wollte, wer ihm auf den Kopf gemacht hat.	Werner Holzwarth	Wolf Erlbruch	German	1994	3+
Garden of Little Creatures	Droles de petites betes	Antoon Krings		French	1994	3+
Clown		Quentin Blake		English	1995	3+
Runaway Train		Benedict Blathwayt		English	1995	3+
Bad Habits!		Babette Cole		English	1998	3+
Pumpkin Soup		Helen Cooper		English	1998	3+
Molly Goes Shopping	Malla handlar	Eva Eriksson		Swedish	1998	3+
The Magic Pocket	ふしぎなポケット	Michio Mado	Mitsumasa Anno	Japanese	1998	3+
Rosa Goes To Daycare	Rosa på dagis	Barbro Lindgren	Eva Eriksson	Swedish	1999	3+
Jamela's Dress		Niki Daly		English	1999	3+
Harry and the Bucketful of Dinosaurs		Ian Whybrow	Adrian Reynolds	English	1999	3+
The Gruffalo		Julia Donaldson	Axel Scheffler	English	1999	3+
Crispin		Ted Dewan		English	2000	3+
Max		Bob Graham		English	2000	3+
Olivia		Ian Falconer		English	2000	3+
Madlenka	Madlenka	Peter Sís		Czech	2000	3+
Marc Just Couldn't Sleep	De verdad que no podía	Gabriela Keselman	Noemí Villamuza	Spanish	2001	3+
The Widemouthed Frog	La grenouille à grande bouche	Francine Vidal	Elodie Nouhen	French	2001	3+
Tatu and Patu in Helsinki	Tatu ja Patu Helsingissä	Aino Havukainen and Sami Toivonen		Finnish	2003	3+
Don't Let the Pigeon Drive the Bus!		Mo Willems		English	2003	3+
Knuffle Bunny: A Cautionary Tale		Mo Willems		English	2004	3+
The Secret Lives of Princesses	Les Princesses oubliées ou inconnues	Philippe Lechermeier	Rébecca Dautremer	French	2004	3+
Lost and Found		Oliver Jeffers		English	2005	3+
Traditional Chinese Folktales	Chinese: 山海經; pinyin: Shānhǎi jīng	unknown		Chinese	221 BC	5+
Tales of Otogizōshi	Japanese: 御伽草子, romanized: Otogi-zōshi	unknown		Japanese	1392	5+
The Adventures of Peach Boy	Japanese: 桃太郎, romanized: Momotarō	unknown		Japanese	1603	5+
Fairy Tales from the Past	Histoires ou contes du temps passé	Charles Perrault		French	1696	5+
Grimms' Fairy Tales	Kinder- und Hausmärchen	Jacob und Wilhelm Grimm		German	1812	5+
A Visit from St. Nicholas		Clement Clarke Moore		English	1822	5+
Fifty Fables for Children	Fünfzig Fabeln für Kinder	Wilhelm Hey	Otto Speckter	German	1833	5+
The Emperor's New Clothes	Keiserens nye Klæder	Hans Christian Andersen		Danish	1837	5+
The Little Mermaid	Den lille Havfrue	Hans Christian Andersen		Danish	1837	5+
The Ugly Duckling	Den grimme Ælling	Hans Christian Andersen		Danish	1843	5+
Book of Nonsense		Edward Lear		English	1846	5+
Max and Moritz	Max und Moritz	Wilhelm Busch		German	1865	5+
The Magic Fishbone		Charles Dickens	John Gilbert	English	1868	5+
The House That Jack Built		unknown	Randolph Caldecott	English	1878	5+
Cole's Funny Picture Book		Edward William Cole		English	1879	5+
A Child's Garden of Verses		Robert Louis Stevenson	Charles Robinson	English	1885	5+
The Blue Fairy Book		Andrew Lang	Henry Justice Ford	English	1889	5+
The Jungle Book		Rudyard Kipling	John Lockwood Kipling	English	1894	5+
Perez the Mouse	El Ratón Pérez	Luis Coloma		Spanish	1894	5+
Just So Stories		Rudyard Kipling		English	1902	5+
The Dutch Twins		Lucy Fitch Perkins		English	1911	5+
The Adventures of Maya the Bee	Die Biene Maja und ihre Abenteuer	Waldemar Bonsels		German	1912	5+
Josephine and Her Dolls		H. C. Cradock	Honor C. Appleton	English	1916	5+
The Magic Pudding		Norman Lindsay		English	1918	5+
Tales of Snugglepot and Cuddlepie		May Gibbs		English	1918	5+
Ameliaranne and the Green Umbrella		Constance Heward	Susan Beatrice Pearse	English	1920	5+
Rupert the Bear		Mary Tourtel		English	1921	5+
Velveteen Rabbit		Margery Williams	William Nicholson	English	1922	5+
Come Hither		Walter de la Mare	Alec Buckels	English	1923	5+
When We Were Very Young		A. A. Milne	Ernest Shepard	English	1924	5+
Now We Are Six		A. A. Milne	Ernest Shepard	English	1927	5+
Milly-Molly-Mandy Stories		Joyce Lankester Brisley		English	1928	5+
Millions of Cats		Wanda Gág		English	1929	5+
The Squirrel, the Hare and the Little Grey Rabbit		Alison Uttley	Margaret Tempest	English	1929	5+
All About Doggie and Pussycat	Povídání o pejskovi a kočičce	Josef Čapek		Czech	1929	5+
The Wonderful Farm	Les Contes du Chat Perché	Marcel Aymé	Natalie Parain	French	1934	5+
Little Tim and the Brave Sea Captain		Edward Ardizzone		English	1936	5+
Elsie Piddock Skips in Her Sleep		Eleanor Farjeon		English	1937	5+
Mr. Popper's Penguins		Richard Atwater	Robert Lawson	English	1938	5+
The Little Wooden Horse		Ursula Moray Williams	Joyce Lankester Brisley	English	1938	5+
Caps for Sale		Esphyr Slobodkina		English	1938	5+
Michka	Michka	Marie Colmont	Feodor Rojankovsky	French	1941	5+
The Little Red Engine Gets a Name		Diana Ross	Jan Le Witt and George Him	English	1942	5+
Tweet Tweet	Čin-Čin	Ľudmila Podjavorinská		Slovak	1943	5+
Tales and Legends	Cuentos y Leyendas	Javier Villafañe	Tabaré	Spanish	1945	5+
Pippi Longstocking	Pippi Långstrump	Astrid Lindgren		Swedish	1945	5+
Stone Soup		Marcia Brown		English	1947	5+
The Doll's House		Rumer Godden		English	1947	5+
My Father's Dragon		Ruth Stiles Gannett	Ruth Chrisman Gannett	English	1948	5+
Blueberries for Sal		Robert McCloskey		English	1948	5+
Apoutsiak	Apoutsiak	Paul-Émile Victor		French	1948	5+
Foxie		Ingri D'Aulaire and Edgar Parin D'Aulaire		English	1949	5+
Peanuts		Charles M. Schulz		English	1950	5+
Roule Galette	Roule Galette	Natha Caputo	Pierre Belvès	French	1950	5+
One Morning in Maine		Robert McCloskey		English	1952	5+
The Bears on Hemlock Mountain		Alice Dalgliesh	Helen Sewell	English	1952	5+
The Biggest Bear		Lynd Ward		English	1952	5+
The Little Horse Bus		Graham Greene	Dorothy Craige	English	1952	5+
Charlotte's Web		Elwyn Brooks White	Garth Williams	English	1952	5+
Marlaguette	Marlaguette	Marie Colmont	Gerda Muller	French	1952	5+
Jip and Janneke	Jip en Janneke	Annie M. G. Schmidt		Dutch	1953	5+
Teddy Robinson Stories		Joan G. Robinson		English	1953	5+
Detectives in Togas	Caius ist ein Dummkopf	Henry Winterfeld	Charlotte Kleinert	German	1953	5+
Harold and the Purple Crayon		Crockett Johnson		English	1955	5+
Clever Polly and The Stupid Wolf		Catherine Storr	Marjorie-Ann Watts	English	1955	5+
A Toad Who Wanted to be a Star	El sapo que quería ser estrella	Oscar Alfaro		Spanish	1955	5+
Italian Folktales	Fiable Italiane	Italo Calvino		Italian	1956	5+
A Tree Is Nice		Janice May Udry	Marc Simont	English	1956	5+
Captain Pugwash		John Ryan		English	1957	5+
Crictor		Tomi Ungerer		English	1958	5+
Chanticlear and the Fox		Barbara Cooney		English	1958	5+
Little Old Mrs. Pepperpot	Kjerringa som ble så lita som ei teskje	Alf Prøysen	Björn Berg	Norwegian	1958	5+
Little Nicholas	Le petit Nicolas	René Goscinny	Jean-Jacques Sempé	French	1959	5+
Are You My Mother?		P. D. Eastman		English	1960	5+
The Orange Cow	La Vache orange	Nathan Hale	Lucile Butel	French	1961	5+
The Three Robbers	Die drei Räuber	Tomi Ungerer		German	1961	5+
Old Master Q	Chinese: 老夫子; Jyutping: lou5 fu1 zi2; pinyin: Lao Fu Zi	Wong Chak		Chinese	1962	5+
The Robber Hotzenplotz	Der Räuber Hotzenplotz	Otfried Preußler	Franz Josef Tripp	German	1962	5+
The Snowy Day		Ezra Jack Keats		English	1962	5+
Mr. Rabbit and the Lovely Present		Charlotte Zolotow	Maurice Sendak	English	1962	5+
Borka		John Burningham		English	1963	5+
Swimmy		Leo Lionni		English	1963	5+
Amelia Bedelia		Peggy Parish	Fritz Siebel	English	1963	5+
The Dreams of the Toad	Los sueños del sapo	Javier Villafañe	Tabaré	Spanish	1963	5+
The Black Smurfs	Le Schtroumpfs Noirs	Peyo		French	1963	5+
Flat Stanley		Jeff Brown	Tomi Ungerer	English	1964	5+
The Giving Tree		Shel Silverstein		English	1964	5+
Dailan Kifki	Dailan Kifki	María Elena Walsh	Sandra Lavandeira	Spanish	1966	5+
Gumdrop	The Adventures of a Vintage Car	Val Biro		English	1966	5+
Frederick		Leo Lionni		English	1967	5+
Cion Cion Blue	Cion Cion Blu	Pinin Carpi	Iris de Paoli	Italian	1968	5+
The Tiger Who Came to Tea		Judith Kerr		English	1968	5+
The Best Nest		P. D. Eastman		English	1968	5+
Kangaroo for All	Cangura para todo	Gloria Fuertes		Spanish	1968	5+
Ramona the Pest		Beverly Cleary	Louis Darling	English	1968	5+
A Necklace of Raindrops		Joan Aiken	Jan Pieńkowski	English	1968	5+
The Duck in the Gun		Joy Cowley	Edward Sorel	English	1969	5+
Sylvester and the Magic Pebble		William Steig		English	1969	5+
A Lion in the Meadow		Margaret Mahy	Jenny Williams	English	1969	5+
Joseph's Yard		Charles Keeping		English	1969	5+
Frog and Toad are Friends		Arnold Lobel		English	1970	5+
Mog the Forgetful Cat		Judith Kerr		English	1970	5+
Figgie Hobbin		Charles Causley	Pat Marriott	English	1970	5+
Hodja from Port	Hodja fra Pjort	Ole Lund Kirkegaard		Danish	1970	5+
Tow Truck Pluck	Pluk van de Petteflet	Annie M. G. Schmidt	Fiep Westendorp	Dutch	1971	5+
Leo the Late Bloomer		Robert Kraus	José Aruego	English	1971	5+
Amos & Boris		William Steig		English	1971	5+
Balloon Cat		Keiko Sena		Japanese	1972	5+
Alexander and the Terrible, Horrible, No Good, Very Bad Day		Judith Viorst	Ray Cruz	English	1972	5+
The Giant Jam Sandwich		Janet Burroway	John Vernon Lord	English	1972	5+
Dinosaurs and All That Rubbish		Michael Foreman		English	1972	5+
The Companions	Os colegas	Lygia Bojunga Nunes		Portuguese	1972	5+
The Real Thief		William Steig		English	1973	5+
Mind Your Own Business		Michael Rosen	Quentin Blake	English	1974	5+
Where the Sidewalk Ends		Shel Silverstein		English	1974	5+
The Worst Witch		Jill Murphy		English	1974	5+
Strega Nona		Tomie dePaola		English	1975	5+
Why Mosquitoes Buzz in People's Ears		Verna Aardema	Leo and Diane Dillon	English	1975	5+
Mr. and Mrs. Pig's Evening Out		Mary Rayner		English	1976	5+
John Brown, Rose, and the Midnight Cat		Jenny Wagner	Ron Brooks	English	1977	5+
Come Away From the Water, Shirley		John Burningham		English	1977	5+
The Lighthouse Keeper's Lunch		Ronda Armitage	David Armitage	English	1977	5+
Teo Discovers the World	Teo Descubre El Mundo	Violeta Denou		Spanish	1977	5+
On the Antilles Sea in a Paper Boat	Por el Mar de las Antillas	Nicolás Guillén	Rapi Diego	Spanish	1977	5+
Fungus the Bogeyman		Raymond Briggs		English	1977	5+
Loon's Necklace		William Toye	Elizabeth Cleaver	English	1977	5+
A Walk in the Park		Anthony Browne		English	1977	5+
Miss Nelson is Missing		Harry Allard	James Marshall	English	1977	5+
Anno's Journey	Tabi no Ehon	Mitsumasa Anno		Japanese	1977	5+
The Cat That Lived a Million Times	Hyakumankai ikita neko	Yōko Sano		Japanese	1977	5+
The Battle of Bubble and Squeak		Philippa Pearce	Alan Baker	English	1978	5+
Cloudy with a Chance of Meatballs		Judi Barrett	Ron Barrett	English	1978	5+
The Girl Who Loved Wild Horses		Paul Goble		English	1978	5+
A Pocket for Corduroy		Don Freeman		English	1978	5+
The Quinkins		Percy Trezise and Dick Roughsey		English	1978	5+
The Enormous Crocodile		Roald Dahl	Quentin Blake	English	1978	5+
Haunted House		Jan Pieńkowski		English	1979	5+
The Prince of Motordu	La belle lisse poire du prince de Motordu	Pierre Élie Ferrier		French	1980	5+
Not now, Bernard		David McKee		English	1980	5+
The Paper Bag Princess		Robert Munsch	Michael Martchenko	English	1980	5+
Jumanji		Chris Van Allsburg		English	1981	5+
Mr. Fox		Gavin Bishop		English	1982	5+
A Chair for My Mother		Vera B. Williams		English	1982	5+
Doctor De Soto		William Steig		English	1982	5+
Two Little Bears		Hanna Muschg	Käthi Bhend	English	1983	5+
The Big Sister	Den stora systern	Siv Widerberg	Cecilia Torudd	Swedish	1984	5+
Dragon Ball	Doragonbōru	Akira Toriyama		Japanese	1984	5+
Mr. Majeika		Humphrey Carpenter	Frank Rodgers	English	1984	5+
The New Kid on the Block		Jack Prelutsky	James Stevenson	English	1984	5+
Katie Morag Delivers the Mail		Mairi Hedderwick		English	1984	5+
If You Give a Mouse a Cookie		Laura Numeroff	Felicia Bond	English	1985	5+
The People Could Fly		Virginia Hamilton	Leo and Diane Dillon	English	1985	5+
Not So Fast Songololo		Niki Daly		English	1985	5+
Linnea in Monet's Garden	Linnea i Målarens Trädgård	Christina Björk	Lena Anderson	Swedish	1985	5+
The Polar Express		Chris Van Allsburg		English	1985	5+
The Jolly Postman		Allan Ahlberg	Janet Ahlberg	English	1986	5+
Animalia		Graeme Base		English	1986	5+
Hey, Al		Arthur Yorinks	Richard Egielski	English	1986	5+
The Hound of the Mound and the Frog of the Bog	El Perro del Cerro y la Rana de la Sabana	Ana Maria Machado	Irene Savino	Spanish	1986	5+
Lend me Your Wings		John Agard	Adrienne Kennaway	English	1987	5+
Henry and Mudge		Cynthia Rylant	Suçie Stevenson	English	1987	5+
My Place		Nadia Wheatley	Donna Rawlins	English	1987	5+
The Hodgeheg		Dick King-Smith	Ann Kronheimer	English	1987	5+
A Balloon for Grandad		Nigel Gray	Jane Ray	English	1988	5+
Anancy-Spiderman		James Berry	Joseph Oiobu	English	1988	5+
Drac and the Gremlin		Allan Baillie	Jane Tanner	English	1988	5+
Matilda		Roald Dahl	Quentin Blake	English	1988	5+
The Keeping Quilt		Patricia Polacco		English	1988	5+
Lon Po Po		Ed Young		English	1989	5+
Loulou	Loulou	Grégoire Solotareff		French	1989	5+
The True Story of the Three Little Pigs		Jon Scieszka	Lane Smith	English	1989	5+
Oh, the Places You'll Go		Dr. Seuss		English	1990	5+
Else-Marie and Her Seven Little Daddies	Else-Marie och småpapporna	Pija Lindenbaum		Swedish	1990	5+
My Friend Percy's Magical Gym Shoes	Min vän Percys magiska gymnastikskor	Ulf Stark	Olof Landström	Swedish	1991	5+
Tar Beach		Faith Ringgold		English	1991	5+
The Stinky Cheese Man		Jon Scieszka	Lane Smith	English	1992	5+
The Little Bird		Paro Anand		English	1993	5+
Friends From the Other Side	Amigos del Otro Lado	Gloria Anzaldúa	Consuelo Méndez	Spanish	1993	5+
Stellaluna		Janell Cannon		English	1993	5+
Horrid Henry		Francesca Simon	Tony Ross	English	1994	5+
Old Tom		Leigh Hobbs		English	1994	5+
Jennifer Jones Won't Leave me Alone		Frieda Wishinsky	Linda Hendry	English	1995	5+
Math Curse		Jon Scieszka	Lane Smith	English	1995	5+
Moka the Cow	La mucca Moka	Agostino Traini		Italian	1995	5+
Lilly's Purple Plastic Purse		Kevin Henkes		English	1996	5+
The Sea at the End of the Forest	Il mare in fondo al bosco	Pinin Carpi		Italian	1997	5+
My Kingdom For a Horse	Mi reino por un caballo	Ana Maria Machado	Elisabeth Teixeira	Spanish	1997	5+
The Great Escape from City Zoo		Tohby Riddle		English	1997	5+
Henry and Amy		Stephen Michael King		English	1998	5+
A Bad Case of Stripes		David Shannon		English	1998	5+
Rumpelstiltskin and Other Grimm Tales		Carol Ann Duffy	Markéta Prachatiká	English	1999	5+
The Death Book	Dödenboken	Pernilla Stalfelt		Swedish	1999	5+
I will Not Ever Never Eat a Tomato		Lauren Child		English	2000	5+
Fox		Margaret Wild	Ron Brooks	English	2000	5+
The Three Pigs		David Wiesner		English	2001	5+
Dodo Gets Married		Petra Mathers		English	2001	5+
Ug: Boy Genius of the Stone Age		Raymond Briggs		English	2001	5+
The Love Book	Kärlekboken	Pernilla Stalfelt		Swedish	2001	5+
That Pesky Rat		Lauren Child		English	2002	5+
Beegu		Alexis Deacon		English	2003	5+
Bridget and the Moose Brothers	Gittan och älgbrorsorna	Pija Lindenbaum		Swedish	2003	5+
The Day the Babies Crawled Away		Peggy Rathman		English	2003	5+
The Biggest Kiss in the World	El beso más largo del mundo	Ricardo Chávez Castañeda	Mary Rodríguez	Spanish	2003	5+
I Hate School		Jeanne Willis	Tony Ross	English	2003	5+
Skippyjon Jones		Judy Schachner		English	2003	5+
Constable Sniffler	Komisario Nuusku ja makkaratehtaan arvoitus	Asko Sirkiä	Pirjo Lipponen	Finnish	2003	5+
The Girl and the Jackdaw Tree	Tyttö ja naakkapuu	Riitta Jalonen	Kristiina Louhi	Finnish	2004	5+
You're All My Favourites		Sam McBratney	Anita Jeram	English	2004	5+
Are We There Yet?		Alison Lester		English	2004	5+
The Sea Monster		Christopher Wormell		English	2005	5+
Zen Shorts		Jon J Muth		English	2005	5+
Leonardo, the Terrible Monster		Mo Willems		English	2005	5+
Llama, Llama, Red Pajama		Anna Dewdney		English	2005	5+
Wolves		Emily Gravett		English	2005	5+
The Boy Who Grew Flowers		Jen Wojtowicz	Steve Adams	English	2005	5+
Snip Snap!		Mara Bergman	Nick Maland	English	2005	5+
The Night Pirates		Peter Harris	Deborah Allwright	English	2005	5+
Flotsam		David Wiesner		English	2006	5+
In Mr. Thunder's House	Nella casa del signor Tuono	Guido Quarzo	Fabrizio Monetti	Italian	2006	5+
The Adventures of the Dish and the Spoon		Mini Grey		English	2006	5+
Aesop's Fables		Aesop		Greek	550 BC	8+
Arabian Nights	Arabic: أَلْفُ لَيْلَةٍ وَلَيْلَةٌ, romanized: Alf Laylah wa-Laylah	unknown		Arabic	1400	8+
Fairy Tales	Les Contes des Fées	Marie Catherine Baronne d’Aulnoy		French	1697	8+
Robinson the Younger	Robinson der Jüngere	Joachim Heinrich Campe		German	1779	8+
Tales from Shakespeare		Charles Lamb and Mary Anne Lamb		English	1807	8+
The Swiss Family Robinson	Der Schweizerische Robinson	Johann David Wyss	Johann Emmanuel Wyss	German	1812	8+
The Nutcracker and other Tales	Nussknacker und Mausekönig	E. T. A. Hoffmann		German	1816	8+
The Pied Piper of Hamelin		Robert Browning		English	1842	8+
A Christmas Carol		Charles Dickens	John Leech	English	1843	8+
Struwwelpeter	Der Struwwelpeter	Heinrich Hoffmann		German	1845	8+
Morality Tales	Cuentos morales para niños formales	Rafael Pombo		Spanish	1854	8+
The Water-Babies		Charles Kingsley	Edward Linley Sambourne	English	1863	8+
Sophie's Misfortunes	Les malheurs de Sophie	Sophie Rostopchine	Horace Castelli	French	1864	8+
Alice's Adventures in Wonderland		Lewis Carroll	John Tenniel	English	1865	8+
Through the Looking Glass		Lewis Carroll	John Tenniel	English	1871	8+
At the Back of the North Wind		George MacDonald	Arthur Hughes	English	1871	8+
The Adventures of Tom Sawyer		Mark Twain		English	1876	8+
Black Beauty		Anna Sewell		English	1877	8+
The Cuckoo Clock		Mrs. Molesworth	Walter Crane	English	1877	8+
The Princess and the Goblin		George MacDonald	Arthur Hughes	English	1878	8+
Nobody's Boy	Sans famille	Hector Malot	Émile Bayard	French	1878	8+
Simple National Slovak Tales	Prostonárodnie slovenské povesti	Pavol Dobšinský		Slovak	1880	8+
Uncle Remus Stories		Joel Chandler Harris		English	1881	8+
The Prince and the Pauper		Mark Twain	Frank T. Merrill, John Harley and Ludvig Sandöe Ipsen	English	1881	8+
Bevis		Richard Jefferies		English	1882	8+
Pinocchio	Le avventure di Pinocchio	Carlo Collodi	Enrico Mazzanti	Italian	1883	8+
Treasure Island		Robert Louis Stevenson		English	1883	8+
Adventures of Huckleberry Finn		Mark Twain	Edward W. Kemble	English	1884	8+
Little Lord Fauntleroy		Frances Hodgson Burnett	Reginald Birch	English	1886	8+
The Canterville Ghost		Oscar Wilde	Frederick Henry Townsend	English	1887	8+
The Happy Prince		Oscar Wilde	Walter Crane and George Percy Jacomb-Hood	English	1888	8+
Carrot Top	Poil de carotte	Jules Renard	Félix Vallotton	French	1894	8+
Moonfleet		J. Meade Falkner		English	1898	8+
The Black Corsair	Il Corsaro Nero	Emilio Salgari	Pipein Gamba	Italian	1898	8+
The Story of the Treasure Seekers		E. Nesbit	Gordon Browner and Lewis Baumer	English	1899	8+
The Wonderful Wizard of Oz		Lyman Baum	William Wallace Denslow	English	1900	8+
Queen of the Caribbean	La regina dei Caraibi	Emilio Salgari	Pipein Gamba	Italian	1901	8+
Sussi and Biribissi	Sussi e Biribissi	Collodi Nipote		Italian	1902	8+
Five Children and It		E. Nesbit	H. R. Millar	English	1902	8+
Rebecca of Sunnybrook Farm		Kate Douglas Wiggin	Helen Mason Grose	English	1903	8+
The Bobbsey Twins		Laura Lee Hope	Martha E. Miller	English	1904	8+
A Little Princess		Frances Hodgson Burnett	Harold Piffard	English	1905	8+
Captain Storm	Il Capitan Tempesta	Emilio Salgari	Alberto della Valle	Italian	1905	8+
Bécassine	Bécassine	Jacqueline Rivière	Joseph Pinchon	French	1905	8+
Paul Street Boys	A Pál-utcai fiúk	Ferenc Molnár		Hungarian	1906	8+
Peter Pan in Kensington Gardens		J. M. Barrie	Arthur Rackham	English	1906	8+
Cautionary Tales for Children		Hilaire Belloc	Basil Temple Blackwood	English	1907	8+
Arsène Lupin, Gentleman-Burglar	Arsène Lupin, gentleman-cambrioleur	Maurice Leblanc		French	1907	8+
The Wonderful Adventures of Nils	Nils Holgerssons underbara resa genom Sverige	Selma Lagerlöf		Swedish	1907	8+
The Wind in the Willows		Kenneth Grahame		English	1908	8+
Anne of Green Gables		Lucy Maud Montgomery	May Claus and William Claus	English	1908	8+
The Extraordinary Adventures of Massagran	Las aventuras extraordinarias de Massagran	Josep Maria Folch i Torres	Joan García Junceda i Supervia	Spanish	1910	8+
The Secret Garden		Frances Hodgson Burnett	Charles Robinson	English	1911	8+
The Adventures of Gian Burrasca	Il giornalino di Gian Burrasca	Vamba		Italian	1911	8+
Nesthäkchen	Nesthäkchen und ihre Puppen	Else Ury		German	1913	8+
Pollyanna		Eleanor Hodgman Porter		English	1913	8+
Platero and I	Platero y yo	Juan Ramón Jiménez		Spanish	1914	8+
The Young Visiters		Daisy Ashford		English	1919	8+
The Story of Doctor Dolittle		Hugh Lofting		English	1920	8+
Just William		Richmal Crompton	Thomas Henry	English	1922	8+
The Boxcar Children		Gertrude Chandler Warner		English	1924	8+
The School at the Châlet		Elinor Brent-Dyer	Nina K. Brisley	English	1925	8+
The Hardy Boys: The Tower Treasure		Franklin W. Dixon		English	1927	8+
Tintin in the Land of the Soviets	Tintin au pays des Soviets	Hergé		French	1929	8+
Emil and the Detectives	Emil und die Detektive	Erich Kästner	Walter Trier	German	1929	8+
What Celia Says	Celia lo que dice	Elena Fortun	Molina Gallent	Spanish	1929	8+
Swallows and Amazons		Arthur Ransome		English	1930	8+
The Secret of the Old Clock		Carolyn Keene		English	1930	8+
Kubula and Kuba Kubikula	Kubula a Kuba Kubikula	Vladislav Vančura	Ondřej Sekora	Czech	1931	8+
The Red U: A Story for Lads	Das rote U: eine Jungengeschichte	Wilhelm Matthießen		German	1932	8+
Little House in the Big Woods		Laura Ingalls Wilder	Garth Williams	English	1932	8+
Farmer Boy		Laura Ingalls Wilder	Garth Williams	English	1933	8+
Professor Branestawm		Norman Hunter	William Heath Robinson	English	1933	8+
Night on the Galactic Railroad	Japanese: 銀河鉄道の夜, romanized: Ginga Tetsudō no Yoru	Kenji Miyazawa	Bryn Barnard	Japanese	1934	8+
Mary Poppins		P. L. Travers	Mary Shepard	English	1934	8+
Little House on the Prairie		Laura Ingalls Wilder	Garth Williams	English	1935	8+
The Good Master		Kate Seredy		English	1935	8+
The Box of Delights		John Masefield		English	1935	8+
A Pony for Jean		Joanna Cannan	Anne Bullen	English	1936	8+
Ballet Shoes		Noel Streatfeild	Ruth Gervis	English	1936	8+
Worzel Gummidge		Barbara Euphan Todd	Elizabeth Alldridge	English	1936	8+
Pigeon Post		Arthur Ransome		English	1936	8+
The Adventures of the Wishing Chair		Enid Blyton	Hilda McGavin	English	1937	8+
The Far-Distant Oxus		Katherine Hull	Pamela Whitlock	English	1937	8+
The Family from One End Street		Eve Garnett		English	1937	8+
The Hobbit		J. R. R. Tolkien		English	1937	8+
The Red Pony		John Steinbeck		English	1937	8+
My Friend Mr. Leakey		J. B. S. Haldane		English	1937	8+
The Circus Is Coming		Noel Streatfeild	Steven Spurrier	English	1938	8+
The Sword in the Stone		T. H. White		English	1938	8+
Old Possum's Book of Practical Cats		T. S. Eliot	Nicolas Bentley	English	1939	8+
The Ship That Flew		Hilda Lewis	Nora Lavrin	English	1939	8+
A Traveller in Time		Alison Utley		English	1939	8+
Lassie Come-Home		Eric Knight	Marguerite Kirmse	English	1940	8+
Betsy-Tacy		Maud Lovelace	Lois Lenski	English	1940	8+
The Black Stallion		Walter Farley	Keith Ward	English	1941	8+
The Swish of the Curtain		Pamela Brown		English	1941	8+
The Little Grey Men		B.B.		English	1942	8+
Five on a Treasure Island		Enid Blyton	Eileen Soper	English	1942	8+
The Little Prince	Le Petit Prince	Antoine de Saint-Exupéry		French	1943	8+
The Hundred Dresses		Eleanor Estes	Louis Slobodkin	English	1944	8+
Brendon Chase		B.B.		English	1944	8+
Rabbit Hill		Robert Lawson		English	1944	8+
Wind on the Moon		Eric Linklater	Nicolas Bentley	English	1944	8+
Stuart Little		Elwyn Brooks White	Garth Williams	English	1945	8+
The Bears' Famous Invasion of Sicily	La famosa invasione degli orsi in Sicilia	Dino Buzzati		Italian	1945	8+
Lucky Luke — Arizona 1880	Arizona 1880	Morris		French	1946	8+
The Little White Horse		Elizabeth Goudge	C. Walter Hodges	English	1946	8+
Mistress Masham's Repose		T. H. White	Fritz Eichenberg	English	1946	8+
Comet in Moominland	Kometjakten	Tove Jansson		Finnish	1946	8+
The School for Cats		Esther Averill		English	1947	8+
Misty of Chincoteague		Marguerite Henry	Wesley Dennis	English	1947	8+
Billy Bunter of Greyfriars School		Frank Richards		English	1947	8+
The Twenty-One Balloons		William Pène du Bois		English	1947	8+
Hurrah for St. Trinian's		Ronald Searle		English	1948	8+
The Fantastic Antoñita	Antoñita La Fantastica	Borita Casas	Mariano Zaragüeta	Spanish	1948	8+
Autumn Term		Antonia Forest		English	1948	8+
Finn Family Moomintroll	Trollkarlens hatt	Tove Jansson		Finnish	1948	8+
Amazon Adventure		Willard Price		English	1949	8+
Children on the Oregon Trail	De Kinder Karavaan	Anna Rutgers van der Loeff	Carl Hollander	Dutch	1949	8+
The Thirteen Clocks		James Thurber	Marc Simont	English	1950	8+
The Lion, the Witch and the Wardrobe		C. S. Lewis	Pauline Baynes	English	1950	8+
The Princess Who Had Magic Fingers	La princesita que tenía los dedos mágicos	María Luisa Gefaell	Pilarín Ballés	Spanish	1950	8+
Adventurous Tales of Machu Picchu	Las aventuras de Machu Picchu	Ciro Alegria		Spanish	1950	8+
Tales of Uncle Rabbit	Cuentos del picaro tio conejo	Euclides Jaramillo		Spanish	1950	8+
Kimba	Jyangeru taitei	Osamu Tezuka		Japanese	1950	8+
Prince Caspian		C. S. Lewis	Pauline Baynes	English	1951	8+
Little Onion	Le avventure di Cipollino	Gianni Rodari	Raul Verdini	Italian	1951	8+
The Voyage of the Dawn Treader		C. S. Lewis	Pauline Baynes	English	1952	8+
The Borrowers		Mary Norton	Diana Stanley	English	1952	8+
Astro Boy (Mighty Atom)	Japanese: 鉄腕アトム, romanized: Tetsuwan Atomu	Osamu Tezuka		Japanese	1952	8+
Marcelino, Bread and Wine	Marcelino, pan y vino	José María Sánchez-Silva	Lorenzo Goñi	Spanish	1952	8+
Jennings and Darbishire		Anthony Buckeridge		English	1952	8+
Down with Skool!		Geoffrey Willans	Ronald Searle	English	1953	8+
A Kid for Two Farthings		Wolf Mankowitz		English	1953	8+
Half Magic		Edward Eager	N. M. Bodecker	English	1954	8+
The Children of Green Knowe		Lucy Boston	Peter Boston	English	1954	8+
A Child's Christmas in Wales		Dylan Thomas	Edward Ardizzone	English	1954	8+
The Wheel on the School		Meindert DeJong	Maurice Sendak	English	1954	8+
Hobberdy Dick		Katharine Mary Briggs	Jane Kingshill	English	1955	8+
Little Bookroom		Eleanor Farjeon	Edward Ardizzone	English	1955	8+
Minnow on the Say		Philippa Pearce	Edward Ardizzone	English	1955	8+
A Hundred Million Francs	Le Cheval sans tête	Paul Berna	Richard Kennedy	French	1955	8+
Old Yeller		Fred Gipson		English	1956	8+
The Hundred and One Dalmatians		Dodie Smith	Janet and Anne Grahame Johnstone	English	1956	8+
The Warden's Niece		Gillian Avery	Dick Hart	English	1957	8+
Thorn Castle	Tüskevár	István Fekete		Hungarian	1957	8+
Gaston	Gaston	André Franquin		French	1957	8+
Tom's Midnight Garden		Philippa Pearce	Susan Einzig	English	1958	8+
Warrior Scarlet		Rosemary Sutcliff	Charles Keeping	English	1958	8+
Mort and Phil	Mortadelo y Filemón	Francisco Ibáñez		Spanish	1958	8+
Walkabout		James Vance Marshall		English	1959	8+
The Boy, the Swallow, and the Cat	El niño, la golondrina y el gato	Miguel Buñuel	Lorenzo Goñi	Spanish	1959	8+
My Great-Grandfather and I	Mein Urgroßvater und ich	James Krüss	Jochen Bartsch	German	1959	8+
The Cricket in Times Square		George Selden	Garth Williams	English	1960	8+
The Bonny Pit Laddie		Frederick Grice	Brian Wildsmith	English	1960	8+
Knight's Fee		Rosemary Sutcliff	Charles Keeping	English	1960	8+
Jim Button and Luke the Engine Driver	Jim Knopf und Lukas der Lokomotivführer	Michael Ende	Franz Josef Tripp	German	1960	8+
Astérix the Gaul	Astérix le Gaulois	René Goscinny	Albert Uderzo	French	1961	8+
The Incredible Journey		Sheila Burnford		English	1961	8+
James and the Giant Peach		Roald Dahl	Nancy Ekholm Burkert	English	1961	8+
Fantômette	Fantômette	Georges Chaulet	Jeanne Hives	French	1961	8+
Six Companions	Les Six Compagnons	Paul-Jacques Bonzon	Albert Chazelle	French	1961	8+
The Phantom Tollbooth		Norton Juster	Jules Feiffer	English	1961	8+
Where the Red Fern Grows		Wilson Rawls		English	1961	8+
D'Aulaires' Book of Greek Myths		Ingri and Edgar Parin d'Aulaire		English	1962	8+
The Winged Watchman		Hilda van Stockum		English	1962	8+
A Dog So Small		Philippa Pearce	Jules Feiffer	English	1962	8+
The Garden	Zahrada	Jiří Trnka		Czech	1962	8+
The Wolves of Willoughby Chase		Joan Aiken	Pat Marriott	English	1962	8+
The Little Pot Boiler		Spike Milligan		English	1963	8+
How the Whale Became		Ted Hughes	George Adamson	English	1963	8+
The Seasons in the City	Marcovaldo	Italo Calvino		Italian	1963	8+
Stig of the Dump		Clive King	Edward Ardizzone	English	1963	8+
Uncle		J. P. Martin	Quentin Blake	English	1964	8+
Chitty Chitty Bang Bang		Ian Fleming	John Burningham	English	1964	8+
The White Stone	Den vita stenen	Gunnel Linde	Eric Palmquist	Swedish	1964	8+
Harriet the Spy		Louise Fitzhugh		English	1964	8+
The Adventures of Rupert the Toad	Las aventuras del sapo Ruperto	Roy Berocay	José Miguel Silva Lara	Spanish	1964	8+
Charlie and the Chocolate Factory		Roald Dahl	Joseph Schindelman	English	1964	8+
Shy Violet	Violetta la timida	Giana Anguissola		Italian	1964	8+
The Book of Three		Lloyd Alexander		English	1964	8+
Nurse Matilda		Christianna Brand	Edward Ardizzone	English	1964	8+
Elidor		Alan Garner	Charles Keeping	English	1965	8+
The Little Fox	Vuk	István Fekete		Hungarian	1965	8+
The Mouse and the Motorcycle		Beverly Cleary	Louis Darling	English	1965	8+
Telephone Tales	Favole al telefono	Gianni Rodari	Bruno Munari	Italian	1965	8+
The King of Copper Mountains	Het Sleutelkruid	Paul Biegel		Dutch	1965	8+
Ash Road		Ivan Southall	Clem Seale	English	1965	8+
The Magic Finger		Roald Dahl	William Pène du Bois	English	1966	8+
Graveyard Kitaro	Hakaba Kitaro	Shigeru Mizuki		Japanese	1966	8+
The Hedgehog Tree	L'albero del riccio	Antonio Gramsci		Italian	1966	8+
The Mouse and His Child		Russell Hoban	Lillian Hoban	English	1967	8+
From the Mixed-Up Files of Mrs. Basil E. Frankweiler		E. L. Konigsburg		English	1967	8+
The Goalkeeper's Revenge		Bill Naughton		English	1967	8+
D'Aulaires' Norse Gods and Giants		Ingri and Edgar Parin D'Aulaire		English	1967	8+
Tales of Rue Broca	Contes de la rue Broca	Pierre Gripari	Claude Lapointe	French	1967	8+
A Wizard of Earthsea		Ursula K. Le Guin		English	1968	8+
The Iron Man: A Children's Story in Five Nights		Ted Hughes	George Adamson	English	1968	8+
My Sweet-Orange Tree	O meu pé de laranja lima	José Mauro de Vasconcelos		Portuguese	1968	8+
Doraemon: Gadget Cat from the Future	ドラえもん	Fujiko Fujio		Japanese	1968	8+
A Pair of Jesus Boots		Sylvia Sherry		English	1969	8+
Charlotte Sometimes		Penelope Farmer		English	1969	8+
The Little Captain	De kleine kapitein	Paul Biegel	Carl Hollander	Dutch	1970	8+
Are You There God? It's Me, Margaret.		Judy Blume		English	1970	8+
When Hitler Stole Pink Rabbit		Judith Kerr		English	1971	8+
Friday, or the Savage Life	Vendredi ou la vie sauvage	Michel Tournier	Georges Lemoine	French	1971	8+
The Shrinking of Treehorn		Florence Parry Heide	Edward Gorey	English	1971	8+
The Carpet People		Terry Pratchett		English	1971	8+
Mrs. Frisby and the Rats of NIMH		Robert C. O’Brien		English	1971	8+
The Cucumber King	Wir pfeifen auf den Gurkenkönig	Christine Nöstlinger	Werner Maurer	German	1972	8+
Watership Down		Richard Adams		English	1972	8+
Efrem the Knight	Efrem il cavaliere	Mino Milani		Italian	1972	8+
The Ghost of Thomas Kempe		Penelope Lively	Anthony Maitland	English	1973	8+
Stradbroke Dreamtime		Oodgeroo Noonuccal	Bronwyn Bancroft	English	1972	8+
The Eighteenth Emergency		Betsy Byars		English	1973	8+
Chlorophyll from the Blue Sky	Clorofilla dal cielo blu	Bianca Pitzorno	Gianna Santini Valeriani	Italian	1973	8+
The Brothers Lionheart	Bröderna Lejonhjärta	Astrid Lindgren	Ilon Wikland	Swedish	1973	8+
Crusade in Jeans	Kruistocht in spijkerbroek	Thea Beckman		Dutch	1973	8+
Grinny		Nicholas Fisk		English	1973	8+
The Fib		George Layton		English	1975	8+
Conrad: The Factory-Made Boy	Konrad oder Das Kind aus der Konservenbüchse	Christine Nöstlinger	Frantz Wittkamp	German	1975	8+
Granny	Oma	Peter Härtling	Peter Knorr	German	1975	8+
The Stone Book		Alan Garner	Michael Foreman	English	1976	8+
Ordinary Jack		Helen Cresswell		English	1977	8+
Bridge to Terabithia		Katherine Paterson	Donna Diamond	English	1977	8+
The Turbulent Term of Tyke Tiler		Gene Kemp	Carolyn Dinan	English	1977	8+
Storm Boy		Colin Thiele		English	1977	8+
Charmed Life		Diana Wynne Jones		English	1977	8+
The Little Man Dressed in Gray	El Hombrecito Vestido de Gris	Fernando Alonso	Ulises Wensell	Spanish	1978	8+
The Kaziranga Trail		Arup Kumar Dutta		English	1978	8+
Under the Mountain		Maurice Gee		English	1979	8+
Fray Perico and His Donkey	Fray Perico y su borrico	Juan Muñoz Martín	Antonio Tello	Spanish	1979	8+
Anastasia Krupnik		Lois Lowry	Diane deGroat	English	1979	8+
Jacob Have I Loved		Katherine Paterson		English	1980	8+
Night Swimmers		Betsy Byars		English	1980	8+
Superfudge		Judy Blume		English	1980	8+
The Indian in the Cupboard		Lynne Reid Banks	Robin Jacques	English	1980	8+
Nothing to be Afraid Of		Jan Mark	David Parkins	English	1980	8+
Jules's Rat	Jules Ratte	Peter Hacks	Klaus Ensikat	German	1981	8+
Goodnight Mister Tom		Michelle Magorian		English	1981	8+
Ronia, the Robber's Daughter	Ronja rövardotter	Astrid Lindgren		Swedish	1981	8+
The BFG		Roald Dahl	Quentin Blake	English	1982	8+
The Haunting		Margaret Mahy		English	1982	8+
The Rattle Bag		Seamus Heaney and Ted Hughes		English	1982	8+
When the Wind Blows		Raymond Briggs		English	1982	8+
Me in the Middle	Bisa Bia, Bisa Bei	Ana Maria Machado	Regina Yolanda	Portuguese	1982	8+
Schoolboy Jia Li	Chinese: 男生贾里全传; lit. 'The Complete Story of Jia Li'	Qin Wenjun		Chinese	1982	8+
The Demon Headmaster		Gillian Cross		English	1982	8+
Max and Sally	Mach a Šebestová	Miloš Macourek	Adolf Born	Czech	1982	8+
War Horse		Michael Morpurgo		English	1982	8+
The Sheep-Pig		Dick King-Smith	Mary Rayner	English	1983	8+
Sunday's Child	Sonntagskind	Gudrun Mebs	Rotraut Susanne Berner	German	1983	8+
Please Mrs. Butler		Allan Ahlberg	Fritz Wegner	English	1983	8+
Mouth Open, Story Jump Out		Grace Hallworth	Art Derry	English	1984	8+
The Eye of the Wolf	L'œil du loup	Daniel Pennac		French	1984	8+
Tomb Raiders	Les pilleurs de sarcophages	Odile Weulersse	Gaëtan Brizzi and Paul Brizzi	French	1984	8+
Pirate's Heart	Das Herz des Piraten	Benno Pludra	Gerhard Großmann	German	1985	8+
Storm		Kevin Crossley-Holland	Alan Marks	English	1985	8+
Sarah, Plain and Tall		Patricia MacLachlan		English	1985	8+
Journey to Jo'burg		Beverley Naidoo		English	1985	8+
The Valley of the Fireflies	El valle de los Cocuyos	Gloria Cecilia Díaz	Francisco Meléndez	Spanish	1985	8+
Why the Whales Came		Michael Morpurgo		English	1985	8+
Gargling with Jelly		Brian Patten	David Mostyn	English	1985	8+
The Hounds of the Morrigan		Pat O’Shea		English	1985	8+
Redwall		Brian Jacques		English	1986	8+
The Snow Spider		Jenny Nimmo		English	1986	8+
Whipping Boy		Sid Fleischman	Peter Sís	English	1987	8+
I am Susannah		Libby Gleeson		English	1987	8+
Quirky Tails		Paul Jennings		English	1987	8+
Mufaro's Beautiful Daughters: An African Tale		John Steptoe		English	1987	8+
A Thief in the Village		James Berry		English	1987	8+
My Friend the Painter	O meu amigo pintor	Lygia Bojunga Nunes		Portuguese	1987	8+
The Whale Rider		Witi Ihimaera		English	1987	8+
Pit Pony		Joyce Barkhouse		English	1989	8+
Two Weeks With the Queen		Morris Gleitzman		English	1989	8+
Hayflower and Quiltshoe	Heinähattu ja Vilttitossu	Sinikka Nopola and Tiina Nopola	Markus Majaluoma	Finnish	1989	8+
Merryll of the Stones		Brian Caswell		English	1989	8+
Bill's New Frock		Anne Fine	Philippe Dupasquier	English	1989	8+
Truckers		Terry Pratchett		English	1989	8+
Haroun and the Sea of Stories		Salman Rushdie		English	1990	8+
The Painted House	La casa pintada	Montserrat del Amo	Francisco Solé	Spanish	1990	8+
Maniac Magee		Jerry Spinelli		English	1990	8+
Shiloh		Phyllis Reynolds Naylor		English	1991	8+
The Story of Tracy Beaker		Jacqueline Wilson	Nick Sharratt	English	1991	8+
Only You Can Save Mankind		Terry Pratchett		English	1992	8+
The Last Giants	Les derniers Géants	François Place		French	1992	8+
Almost Everyone Could Topple	Bijna iedereen kon omvallen	Toon Tellegen		Dutch	1993	8+
The Giver		Lois Lowry		English	1993	8+
Manolito Gafotas	Los trapos sucios	Elvira Lindo	Emilio Urberuaga	Spanish	1994	8+
A Mole Always Turns Up On Its Own	Ein Maulwurf kommt immer allein	Hanna Johansen		German	1994	8+
The Bed and Breakfast Star		Jacqueline Wilson	Nick Sharratt	English	1994	8+
Way Home		Libby Hathorn	Gregory Rogers	English	1994	8+
Stories to Fernando	Historias a Fernández	Ema Wolf	Jorge Sanzol	Spanish	1994	8+
Halinka	Wenn das Glück kommt, muss man ihm einen Stuhl hinstellen	Mirjam Pressler		German	1994	8+
Watch Out For the Cat	Occhio al gatto	Silvana Gandolfi	Giulia Orecchia	Italian	1995	8+
Poordog The Starved	Casiperro del Hambre	Graciela Montes	Oscar Rojas	Spanish	1995	8+
45 & 47 Stella Street and Everything that Happened		Elizabeth Honey		English	1995	8+
Tashi		Anna Fienberg and Barbara Fienberg	Kim Gamble	English	1995	8+
Clockwork		Philip Pullman	Peter Bailey	English	1995	8+
The View from Saturday		E. L. Konigsburg		English	1996	8+
Johnny and the Bomb		Terry Pratchett		English	1996	8+
The Story of a Seagull	Historia de una gaviota y del gato que le enseñó a volar	Luis Sepúlveda	Miles Hyman	Spanish	1996	8+
Harry Potter and the Philosopher's Stone		Joanne K. Rowling		English	1997	8+
Fire, Bed and Bone		Henrietta Branford		English	1997	8+
Matthias and Grandpa	Mattia e il nonno	Roberto Piumini	Cecco Mariniello	Italian	1997	8+
Toby		Graciela Beatriz Cabal	Alberto Pez	Spanish	1997	8+
The Composition	La composición	Antonio Skármeta	Alfonso Ruano	Spanish	1998	8+
Skellig		David Almond		English	1998	8+
Just Annoying!		Andy Griffiths	Terry Denton	English	1998	8+
My Girragundji		Meme McDonald and Boori Monty Pryor		English	1998	8+
The Sterkarm Handshake		Susan Price		English	1998	8+
The Dog With the Yellow Heart	Der Hund mit dem gelben Herzen	Jutta Richter		German	1998	8+
Clarice Bean: That's Me		Lauren Child		English	1999	8+
A Series of Unfortunate Events		Lemony Snicket	Brett Helquist	English	1999	8+
Harry Potter and the Prisoner of Azkaban		Joanne K. Rowling		English	1999	8+
Kensuke's Kingdom		Michael Morpurgo	Michael Foreman	English	1999	8+
Hitler's Daughter		Jackie French		English	1999	8+
Something's Fishy, Hazel Green!		Odo Hirsch	Andrew McLean	English	2000	8+
Harry Potter and the Goblet of Fire		Joanne K. Rowling		English	2000	8+
The Day I Learned to Tame Spiders	Der Tag, als ich lernte die Spinnen zu zähmen	Jutta Richter		German	2000	8+
Cirque du Freak: A Living Nightmare		Darren Shan		English	2000	8+
Because of Winn-Dixie		Kate DiCamillo		English	2000	8+
Father Grew Wings in Spring	Keväällä isä sai siivet	Tomi Kontio		Finnish	2000	8+
Alex Rider: Stormbreaker		Anthony Horowitz		English	2000	8+
The Papunya School Book		Nadia Wheatley	Mary Malbunka	English	2000	8+
The Vile Village		Lemony Snicket	Brett Helquist	English	2001	8+
Rupert the Rapper and Aunt Deep Freeze	Risto Räppääjä ja pakastaja-Elvi	Sinikka Nopola and Tiina Nopola	Aino Havukainen and Sami Toivonen	Finnish	2001	8+
Mortal Engines		Philip Reeve		English	2001	8+
Artemis Fowl		Eoin Colfer		English	2001	8+
Aldabra	Aldabra: la tartaruga che amava Shakespeare	Silvana Gandolfi	Fabian Negrin	Italian	2001	8+
Journey to the River Sea		Eva Ibbotson		English	2001	8+
City of the Beasts	La Ciudad de las bestias	Isabel Allende		Spanish	2002	8+
Utterly Me, Clarice Bean		Lauren Child		English	2002	8+
The Wolves in the Walls		Neil Gaiman	Dave McKean	English	2003	8+
The Field Guide		Holly Black	Tony DiTerlizzi	English	2003	8+
The Naming Of Tishkin Silk		Glenda Millard	Caroline Magerl	English	2003	8+
Inkheart	Tintenherz	Cornelia Funke		German	2003	8+
Three Fairy Tales	Tres cuentos de hadas	Gustavo Martín Garzo	Jesús Gabán	Spanish	2003	8+
The Tale of Despereaux		Kate DiCamillo	Timothy Basil Ering	English	2003	8+
Millions		Frank Cottrell Boyce		English	2004	8+
Wolf Brother		Michelle Paver		English	2004	8+
Ark Angel		Anthony Horowitz		English	2005	8+
Rabbit and Coyote	Conejo y Coyote	Beatriz Donnet		Spanish	2005	8+
The Cat, or How I Lost Eternity	Die Katze oder wie ich die Ewigkeit verloren habe	Jutta Richter	Rotraut Susanne Berner	German	2006	8+
The Boy in the Striped Pyjamas		John Boyne		English	2006	8+
The Arrival		Shaun Tan		English	2006	8+
The Invention of Hugo Cabret		Brian Selznick		English	2007	8+
The Graveyard Book		Neil Gaiman	Chris Riddell	English	2008	8+
Bertoldo, Bertoldino, and Cacasenno	Bertoldo, Bertoldino e Cacasenno	Giulio Cesare Croce and Adriano Banchieri		Italian	1620	12+
Robinson Crusoe		Daniel Defoe		English	1719	12+
Gulliver's Travels		Jonathan Swift		English	1726	12+
The Adventures of Baron Münchhausen	Wunderbare Reisen zu Wasser und zu Lande – Feldzüge und lustige Abenteuer des Freiherrn von Münchhausen	Gottfried August Bürger		German	1786	12+
The Three Musketeers	Les Trois Mousquetaires	Alexandre Dumas		French	1844	12+
The Children of the New Forest		Frederick Marryat		English	1847	12+
The Scarlet Letter		Nathaniel Hawthorne		English	1850	12+
The Rose and the Ring		William Makepeace Thackeray		English	1855	12+
Tom Brown's Schooldays		Thomas Hughes		English	1857	12+
The Coral Island		Robert Michael Ballantyne		English	1857	12+
Eric, or Little by Little		Frederic Farrar		English	1858	12+
Captain Fracasse	Le Capitaine Fracasse	Théophile Gautier		French	1863	12+
Journey to the Center of the Earth	Voyage au centre de la Terre	Jules Verne		French	1864	12+
The Good Little Devil	Un bon petit diable	Sophie de Ségur	Horace Castelli	French	1865	12+
Little Women		Louisa May Alcott	May Alcott	English	1868	12+
20,000 Leagues Under the Sea	20.000 lieues sous les mers	Jules Verne		French	1869	12+
What Katy Did		Susan Coolidge		English	1872	12+
Around the World in 80 Days	Le Tour du monde en 80 jours	Jules Verne		French	1873	12+
Heidi	Heidis Lehr- und Wanderjahre	Johanna Spyri		German	1880	12+
The Fifth Form at St. Dominic's		Talbot Baines Reed		English	1881	12+
With Clive in India		George Alfred Henty		English	1884	12+
Kidnapped		Robert Louis Stevenson		English	1886	12+
Heart	Cuore	Edmondo De Amicis		Italian	1886	12+
Seven Little Australians		Ethel Turner		English	1894	12+
The Prisoner of Zenda		Anthony Hope		English	1894	12+
The Treasure in Silver Lake	Der Schatz im Silbersee	Karl May		German	1894	12+
Eclipse of the Crescent Moon	Egri csillagok	Géza Gárdonyi		Hungarian	1899	12+
The Tigers of Mompracem	Le Tigri di Mompracem	Emilio Salgari	Pipein Gamba	Italian	1900	12+
The Hound of the Baskervilles		Arthur Conan Doyle		English	1902	12+
The Call of the Wild		Jack London		English	1903	12+
Jolanda, Daughter of the Black Corsair	Jolanda la figlia del Corsaro Nero	Emilio Salgari	Alberto della Valle	Italian	1905	12+
White Fang		Jack London		English	1906	12+
The Railway Children		E. Nesbit		English	1906	12+
The Fortunes of Philippa		Angela Brazil		English	1906	12+
Jock of the Bushveld		James Percy FitzPatrick	Edmund Caldwell	English	1907	12+
The Mystery of the Yellow Room	Le mystère de la chambre jaune	Gaston Leroux		French	1907	12+
A Girl of the Limberlost		Gene Stratton-Porter	Władysław T. Benda	English	1909	12+
The War of the Buttons	La Guerre des boutons	Louis Pergaud		French	1912	12+
Tales of the Jungle	Cuentos de la selva	Horacio Quiroga		Spanish	1918	12+
The Cave Children	Die Höhlenkinder	Alois Theodor Sonnleitner		German	1918	12+
The Dark Frigate		Charles Boardman Hawes	Aiden Lassell Ripley	English	1923	12+
In Medeleni	La Medeleni	Ionel Teodoreanu		Romanian	1925	12+
Emily Climbs		Lucy Maud Montgomery		English	1925	12+
Tarka the Otter		Henry Williamson	Charles Tunnicliffe	English	1927	12+
Ede and Unku	Ede und Unku	Alex Wedding		German	1931	12+
Biggles: The Camels Are Coming		William Earl Johns		English	1932	12+
The Children from Number 67	Die Kinder aus Nummer 67	Lisa Tetzner		German	1933	12+
Missing from Saint-Agil	Les Disparus de Saint-Agil	Pierre Véry		French	1935	12+
Caddie Woodlawn		Carol Ryrie Brink	Kate Seredy	English	1935	12+
The Happy Return		Cecil Scott Forester		English	1937	12+
The Yearling		Marjorie Kinnan Rawlings	N. C. Wyeth	English	1938	12+
Cue for Treason		Geoffrey Trease	Beatrice Goldsmith	English	1940	12+
Red Zora	Die rote Zora und ihre Bande	Kurt Held		German	1941	12+
We Couldn't Leave Dinah		Mary Treadgold	Stuart Tresilian	English	1941	12+
My Friend Flicka		Mary O'Hara	John Steuart Curry	English	1941	12+
Johnny Tremain		Esther Forbes		English	1943	12+
Woods of Windri		Violet Needham	Joyce Bruce	English	1944	12+
The Otterbury Incident		Cecil Day-Lewis	Edward Ardizzone	English	1948	12+
I Capture the Castle		Dodie Smith		English	1949	12+
Metropolis	メトロポリス	Osamu Tezuka		Japanese	1949	12+
The Path	El Camino	Miguel Delibes		Spanish	1950	12+
Big Tiger and Christian	Großer-Tiger und Christian	Fritz Mühlenweg	Raffaello Busoni	German	1950	12+
The Catcher in the Rye		J. D. Salinger		English	1951	12+
The Wool-Pack: A Tale of Adventure		Cynthia Harnett		English	1951	12+
The Sons of Great Bear	Die Söhne der Großen Bärin	Liselotte Welskopf-Henrich		German	1951	12+
Adventures of the Ingenious Alfanhuí	Industrias y andanzas de Alfanhuí	Rafael Sánchez Ferlosio		Spanish	1951	12+
The Cloven Viscount	Il visconte dimezzato	Italo Calvino		Italian	1952	12+
King Arthur and His Knights of the Round Table		Roger Lancelyn Green	Arthur Henderson Hall	English	1953	12+
Fahrenheit 451		Ray Bradbury		English	1953	12+
Eagle of the Ninth		Rosemary Sutcliff	C. Walter Hodges	English	1954	12+
The Fellowship of the Ring		J. R. R. Tolkien		English	1954	12+
Lord of the Flies		William Golding		English	1954	12+
Carry on, Mr. Bowditch		Jean Lee Latham		English	1955	12+
Viking's Dawn		Henry Treece	Christine Hilda Price	English	1955	12+
Captain Thunder	El Capitán Trueno	Víctor Mora	Ambrós	Spanish	1956	12+
Neitah: A Girl in the Far North	Neitah, ein Mädchen im hohen Norden	Edith Klatt		German	1956	12+
The Silver Sword		Ian Serraillier	C. Walter Hodges	English	1956	12+
The Cherry Kids	Cireșarii	Constantin Chirita		Romanian	1956	12+
Rifles for Watie		Harold Keith		English	1957	12+
The Baron in the Trees	Il barone rampante	Italo Calvino		Italian	1957	12+
The Witch of Blackbird Pond		Elizabeth George Speare		English	1958	12+
The Silver Brumby		Elyne Mitchell		English	1958	12+
Marianne Dreams		Catherine Storr	Marjorie-Ann Watts	English	1958	12+
The Lion	Le lion	Joseph Kessel		French	1958	12+
Friday's Tunnel		John Verney		English	1959	12+
Zazie in the Metro	Zazie dans le métro	Raymond Queneau		French	1959	12+
My Side of the Mountain		Jean Craighead George		English	1959	12+
The Nonexistent Knight	Il cavaliere inesistente	Italo Calvino		Italian	1959	12+
To Kill a Mockingbird		Harper Lee		English	1960	12+
The Weirdstone of Brisingamen		Alan Garner		English	1960	12+
Island of the Blue Dolphins		Scott O’Dell		English	1960	12+
Tangara		Nan Chauncy		English	1961	12+
Friedrich	Damals war es Friedrich	Hans Peter Richter		German	1961	12+
A Wrinkle in Time		Madeleine L’Engle		English	1962	12+
The Letter for the King	De brief voor de koning	Tonke Dragt		Dutch	1962	12+
The Twelve and the Genii		Pauline Clarke		English	1962	12+
Time of Trial		Hester Burton		English	1963	12+
I Am David		Anne Holm		English	1963	12+
Pastures of the Blue Crane		Hesba Fay Brinsmead		English	1964	12+
The Stowaway of the Ulysses	El polizón del Ulises	Ana María Matute		Spanish	1965	12+
Gentle Ben		Walt Morey	John Schoenherr	English	1965	12+
The Min-Min		Mavis Thorpe Clark	Genevieve Melrose	English	1966	12+
The Owl Service		Alan Garner		English	1967	12+
The Outsiders		Susan E. Hinton		English	1967	12+
Flambards		K. M. Peyton		English	1967	12+
Smith		Leon Garfield	Antony Maitland	English	1967	12+
The Dolphin Crossing		Jill Paton Walsh		English	1967	12+
Picnic at Hanging Rock		Joan Lindsay		English	1967	12+
The Pigman		Paul Zindel		English	1968	12+
A Kestrel for a Knave		Barry Hines		English	1968	12+
Chocky		John Wyndham		English	1968	12+
The Cay		Theodore Taylor		English	1969	12+
Sounder		William H. Armstrong		English	1969	12+
Where the Lilies Bloom		Vera Cleaver and Bill Cleaver	James J. Spanfeller	English	1969	12+
The Edge of the Cloud		K. M. Peyton		English	1969	12+
Oscar at the South Pole	Oscar en el Polo Sur	Carmen Kurtz		Spanish	1970	12+
The Summer of the Swans		Betsy Byars	Ted CoConis	English	1970	12+
The Lark and the Laurel		Barbara Willard		English	1970	12+
Grover		Vera Cleaver and Bill Cleaver		English	1970	12+
I'm the King of the Castle		Susan Hill		English	1970	12+
A Long Way from Verona		Jane Gardam		English	1971	12+
Winter in Wartime	Oorlogswinter	Jan Terlouw	Jan Wesseling	Dutch	1972	12+
No Way of Telling		Emma Smith		English	1972	12+
Across the Barricades		Joan Lingard		English	1972	12+
The Summer Book	Sommarboken	Tove Jansson		Finnish	1972	12+
Julie of the Wolves		Jean Craighead George	John Schoenherr	English	1972	12+
Stories From the Year One Thousand	Storie dell'anno mille	Tonino Guerra	Adriano Zannino	Italian	1972	12+
The Spirit Wind		Max Fatchen	Trevor Stubley	English	1973	12+
Fly Away Home	Maikäfer, flieg!	Christine Nöstlinger		German	1973	12+
The Nargun and the Stars		Patricia Wrightson	Robert Ingpen	English	1973	12+
The Slave Dancer		Paula Fox	Eros Keith	English	1973	12+
The Friends		Rosa Guy		English	1973	12+
The Dark is Rising		Susan Cooper	Alan E. Cober	English	1973	12+
Carrie's War		Nina Bawden		English	1973	12+
M. C. Higgins		Virginia Hamilton		English	1974	12+
Nobody's Family Is Going to Change		Louise Fitzhugh		English	1974	12+
The Trouble with Donovan Croft		Bernard Ashley	Fermin Rocker	English	1974	12+
Who Does this Kid Take After?	Kire ütött ez a gyerek?	Éva Janikovszky	Lázsló Réber	Hungarian	1974	12+
The Chocolate War		Robert Cormier		English	1974	12+
Twopence a Tub		Susan Price		English	1975	12+
Tuck Everlasting		Natalie Babbitt		English	1975	12+
The Machine Gunners		Robert Westall	John Williamson	English	1975	12+
The Peppermint Pig		Nina Bawden	Charles Lilly	English	1975	12+
Crisis on Conshelf Ten		Monica Hughes	G. Humphreys	English	1975	12+
The October Child		Eleanor Spence	Malcolm Green	English	1976	12+
Dragonsong		Anne McCaffrey		English	1976	12+
Bilgewater		Jane Gardam		English	1976	12+
Roll of Thunder, Hear My Cry		Mildred D. Taylor	Jerry Pinkney	English	1976	12+
Thunder and Lightnings		Jan Mark		English	1976	12+
First of Midnight		Marjorie Darke	Anthony Morris	English	1977	12+
Underground to Canada		Barbara Smucker	Imre Hofbauer	English	1977	12+
The Westing Game		Ellen Raskin		English	1978	12+
Hey, Dollface		Deborah Hautzig		English	1978	12+
After the First Death		Robert Cormier		English	1979	12+
Tulku		Peter Dickinson		English	1979	12+
The Neverending Story	Die unendliche Geschichte	Michael Ende	Roswitha Quadflieg	German	1979	12+
My One-Legged Friend and Me	Ykä Yksinäinen	Anna-Liisa Haakana		Finnish	1980	12+
Playing Beatie Bow		Ruth Park		English	1980	12+
The Sentinels		Peter Carter		English	1980	12+
Homecoming		Cynthia Voigt	Sharon Scotland	English	1981	12+
The Scarecrows		Robert Westall		English	1981	12+
Agnes Cecilia	Agnes Cecilia - en sältsam historia	Maria Gripe		Swedish	1981	12+
The Island on Bird Street	Hebrew: האי ברחוב הציפורים, romanized: Ha-I bi-Reḥov ha-Zipporim	Uri Orlev		Hebrew	1981	12+
The Secret Diary of Adrian Mole		Sue Townsend	Caroline Holden	English	1982	12+
The Village by the Sea		Anita Desai		English	1982	12+
Nausicaä	Japanese: 風の谷のナウシカ, romanized: Kaze no Tani no Naushika	Hayao Miyazaki		Japanese	1982	12+
Handles		Jan Mark	David Parkins	English	1983	12+
A Parcel of Patterns		Jill Paton Walsh		English	1983	12+
Talking in Whispers		James Watson		English	1983	12+
Hating Alison Ashley		Robin Klein		English	1984	12+
Brother in the Land		Robert Swindells		English	1984	12+
Badger on the Barge		Janni Howker		English	1984	12+
The Changeover		Margaret Mahy		English	1984	12+
The Ruby in the Smoke		Philip Pullman		English	1985	12+
Johnny, My Friend	Janne, min vän	Peter Pohl		Swedish	1985	12+
Hatchet		Gary Paulsen		English	1986	12+
Taronga		Victor Kelleher		English	1986	12+
The Ghost Drum		Susan Price		English	1987	12+
Madame Doubtfire		Anne Fine		English	1987	12+
Strollers		Lesley Beake		English	1987	12+
The Cloud	Die Wolke	Gudrun Pausewang		German	1987	12+
Alex		Tessa Duder		English	1987	12+
The Devil's Arithmetic		Jane Yolen		English	1988	12+
A Pack of Lies		Geraldine McCaughrean		English	1988	12+
Caperucita in Manhattan	Caperucita en Manhattan	Carmen Martín Gaite		Spanish	1989	12+
Number the Stars		Lois Lowry		English	1989	12+
Thunderwith		Libby Hathorn		English	1989	12+
Strange Objects		Gary Crew		English	1990	12+
Redwork		Michael Bedard		English	1990	12+
Rocco		Sherryl Jordan		English	1990	12+
The Visits	Las Visitas	Silvia Schujer		Spanish	1991	12+
Dear Nobody		Berlie Doherty		English	1991	12+
Listen to My Heart	Ascolta il mio cuore	Bianca Pitzorno		Italian	1991	12+
Memoirs of a Basque Cow	Behi euskaldun baten memoriak	Bernardo Atxaga		Basque	1991	12+
Looking for Alibrandi		Melina Marchetta		English	1992	12+
There Will be Wolves		Karleen Bradford		English	1992	12+
Pagan's Crusade		Catherine Jinks		English	1992	12+
Flour Babies		Anne Fine		English	1992	12+
Titeuf	Titeuf	Zep		French	1992	12+
See Ya, Simon		David Hill		English	1992	12+
Heart's Delight	Hjärtans fröjd	Per Nilsson		Swedish	1992	12+
Tomorrow, When the War Began		John Marsden		English	1993	12+
Some of the Kinder Planets		Tim Wynne-Jones		English	1993	12+
Rowan of Rin		Emily Rodda		English	1993	12+
The Gathering		Isobelle Carmody		English	1993	12+
Gold Dust		Geraldine McCaughrean		English	1993	12+
Dougy		James Moloney		English	1993	12+
Stone Cold		Robert Swindells		English	1993	12+
Foxspell		Gillian Rubinstein		English	1994	12+
Walk Two Moons		Sharon Creech		English	1994	12+
Switchers		Kate Thompson		English	1994	12+
Whispers in the Graveyard		Theresa Breslin		English	1994	12+
See How They Run		David McRobbie		English	1994	12+
A Jump into the Other World	Salto nell'Ultramondo	Bruno Tognolini	Roberto Luciani	Italian	1994	12+
When the World Was Still Young	Als die Welt noch jung war	Jürg Schubiger	Rotraut Susanne Berner	German	1995	12+
Northern Lights		Philip Pullman		English	1995	12+
When the Snow Fell	Pojken som sov med snö i sin säng	Henning Mankell		Swedish	1996	12+
Peeling the Onion		Wendy Orr		English	1996	12+
The Gifting		Sophie Masson		English	1996	12+
Out of the Dust		Karen Hesse		English	1997	12+
Deadly, Unna?		Phillip Gwynne		English	1997	12+
River Boy		Tim Bowler		English	1997	12+
Pig-Heart Boy		Malorie Blackman		English	1997	12+
Holes		Louis Sachar		English	1998	12+
The Crowstarver		Dick King-Smith		English	1998	12+
I Am Not Esther		Fleur Beale		English	1998	12+
Bud, Not Buddy		Christopher Paul Curtis		English	1999	12+
Stony Heart Country		David Metzenthen		English	1999	12+
The Illustrated Mum		Jacqueline Wilson	Nick Sharratt	English	1999	12+
Not Chicago. Not Here	Nicht Chicago. Nicht hier.	Kirsten Boie		German	1999	12+
Postcards from No Man's Land		Aidan Chambers		English	1999	12+
Thursday's Child		Sonya Hartnett		English	2000	12+
The Wind Singer		William Nicholson		English	2000	12+
Troy		Adèle Geras		English	2000	12+
Witch Child		Celia Rees		English	2000	12+
Oh, Boy!	Oh, Boy!	Marie-Aude Murail		French	2000	12+
Arthur		Kevin Crossley-Holland		English	2000	12+
Coram Boy		Jamila Gavin		English	2000	12+
Refugee Boy		Benjamin Zephaniah		English	2001	12+
Noughts & Crosses		Malorie Blackman		English	2001	12+
I am Polleke	Ik ben Polleke hoor!	Guus Kuijer	Alice Hoogstad	Dutch	2001	12+
Walking Naked		Alyssa Brugman		English	2002	12+
The Slightly True Story of Cedar B. Hartley		Martine Murray		English	2002	12+
Across the Nightingale Floor		Lian Hearn		English	2002	12+
Parvana's Journey		Deborah Ellis		English	2002	12+
The Messenger		Markus Zusak		English	2002	12+
Dragonkeeper		Carole Wilkinson		English	2003	12+
Crispin		Avi		English	2002	12+
Four Sisters	Quatre soeurs	Malika Ferdjoukh		French	2003	12+
Slaves of Quentaris		Paul Collins		English	2003	12+
The Keys to the Kingdom: Mister Monday		Garth Nix		English	2003	12+
The Curious Incident of the Dog in the Night-time		Mark Haddon		English	2003	12+
The Fire-Eaters		David Almond		English	2003	12+
Private Peaceful		Michael Morpurgo		English	2003	12+
Keeper		Mal Peet		English	2003	12+
The Amulet of Samarkand		Jonathan Stroud		English	2003	12+
The Running Man		Michael Gerard Bauer		English	2004	12+
By the River		Steven Herrick		English	2004	12+
A Boat in the Forest	Una barca nel bosco	Paolo Mastrocola		Italian	2004	12+
How I Live Now		Meg Rosoff		English	2004	12+
Memories of Idhún: The Resistance	Memorias de Idhún: La Resistencia	Laura Gallego García		Spanish	2004	12+
Twilight		Stephenie Meyer		English	2005	12+
Grimpow	Grimpow	Rafael Ábalos		Spanish	2005	12+
New Policeman		Kate Thompson		English	2005	12+
My Big Birkett		Lisa Shanahan		English	2006	12+
The Red Shoe		Ursula Dubosarsky		English	2006	12+
Toby Alone	Tobie Lolness	Timothée de Fombelle	François Place	French	2006	12+
Monster Blood Tattoo: Foundling		David Cornish		English	2006	12+
Winter Song	Le Combat d'hiver	Jean-Claude Mourlevat		French	2006	12+
The Silver Jaguar	Der silberne Jaguar	Hermann Schulz		German	2007	12+
Finding Violet Park		Jenny Valentine		English	2007	12+

== Reviews ==
Julie Just of The New York Times said of 1001 Children's Books You Must Read Before You Grow Up that the reader will "be grateful to discover or revisit and many more that have been all but forgotten." Similarly, Meghan Cox Gurdon of The Wall Street Journal said that "and, happily, what the Internet taketh, by tempting children away from reading, it giveth back to parents, by making it easy for them to locate obscure books that might be otherwise be impossible to find." Roger Ebert tweeted about it, saying "with bright pictures and easy prose, this could be the first."

== See also ==
- 1001 Books You Must Read Before You Die
- 1001 Albums You Must Hear Before You Die
- 1001 Movies You Must See Before You Die
