= Uppo-Nalle =

1977 children's novel by Elina Karjalainen

Front cover, 1977 edition

Uppo-Nalle is a children's novel by the Finnish author Elina Karjalainen. It was first published in 1977, and was followed by 21 other novels about the same characters. Hannu Taina is the illustrator.

The main character in the books is Uppo-Nalle, an animate teddy bear who loves poetry. The bear was named Uppo-Nalle (Finnish for "sunken bear") because he was originally found underwater during a river cruise. Other characters in the books are a girl named Reeta, her grandmother, and their dog named Laulava Lintukoira (Finnish for "singing bird dog").

In 1980 a play based on the books was shown in a Kuopio theatre, and a film was brought out in 1991.

Uppo-Nalle has been honoured with a postage stamp and by having a children's hospital named after him.
