= The Boy Who Grew Flowers =

2005 picture book by Jennifer Wojtowicz

- Author: Jennifer Wojtowicz
- Language: English
- Genre: children's picture book
- Publisher: Barefoot Books
- Publication date: October 5, 2005
- Publication place: United States
- Pages: 32 pgs
- ISBN: 1841486868

The Boy Who Grew Flowers is a children's picture book written by Jennifer Wojtowicz and illustrated by Steve Adams. Wojtowicz has stated that she was inspired to write the book due to her relationship with her autistic brother. The book has been adapted into a stage play.

== Plot ==
The Boy Who Grew Flowers follows the character of Rink Bowagon, a little boy disliked among his peers that has the ability to sprout flowers on his body on full moons. This changes one day when a new girl named Angelina starts attending his class, causing Rink to become enamored of her. Rink has no way of knowing that like him, Angelina also has something special about her that he will eventually discover during the school's full moon dance.

== Reception ==
Critical response to the book was positive. Reviewers for the School Library Journal called it "A lovely story about celebrating differences." In addition, the School Library Journal praised the "luminous scenes and soulful relationship between Rink and Angelina". The Stage wrote that the book's message might be "a little sophisticated and hidden away for the lower end of the target age group." However, The Stage liked that the book expressed "the mother’s dialogue solely in musical phrases and the giant school satchel which Rink uses to hide his blushes - and his petunias." Booklist praised the book, calling it an "odd, lovely offering". Publishers Weekly positively reviewed the book, citing "If the narrative doesn't follow through on its early promise of helping young readers understand the beauty of being different, it will remind them of the power of kindness." Wired News praised the book's artwork while saying that "the fantasy on which the story is based prevents, I think, most little kids from realizing the message is there, even while they absorb it."
