= Rafael Ábalos =

Spanish writer

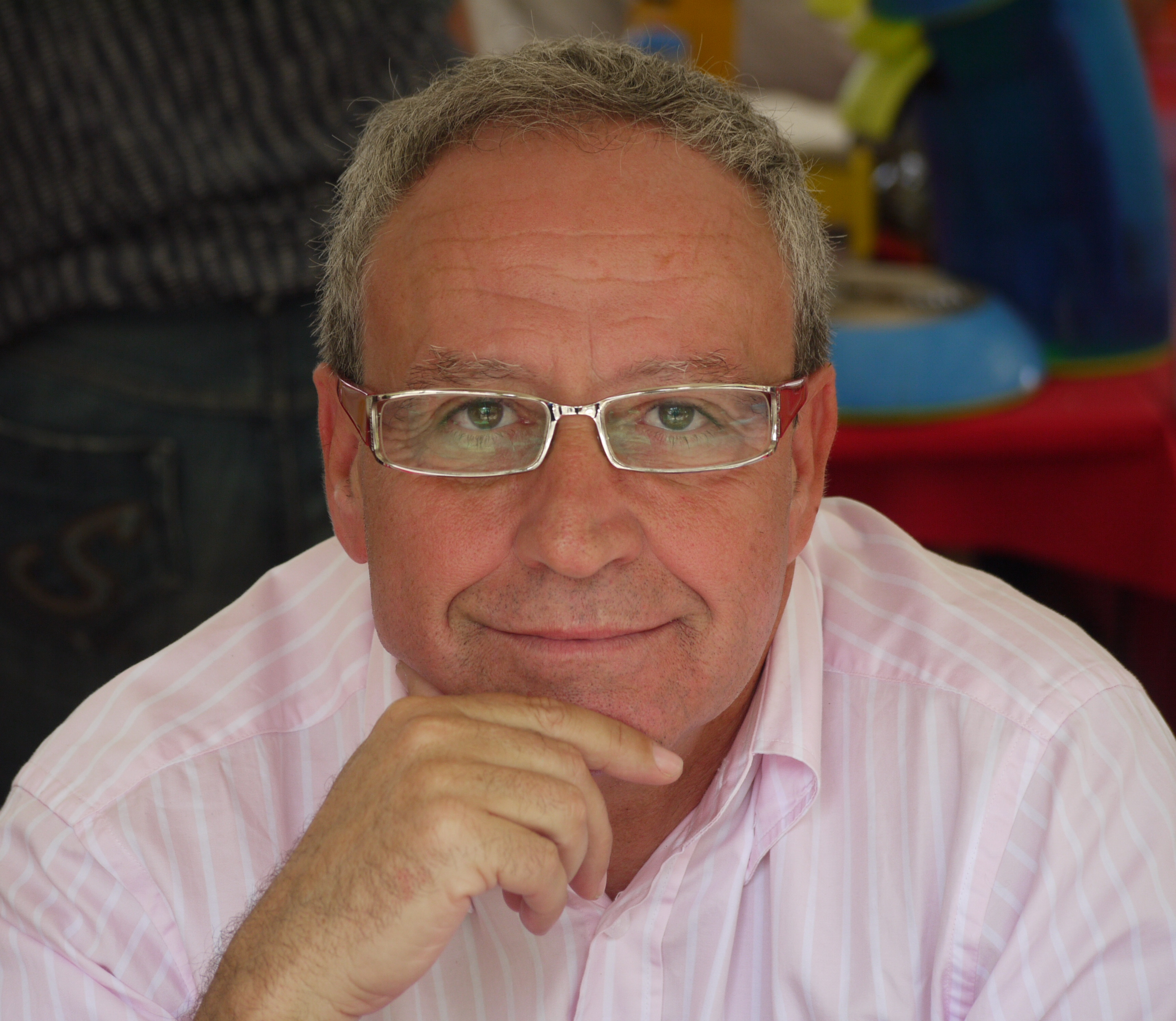
- Rafael Ábalos at the 'Comédie du Livre' of Montpellier, France, 2009.
- Born: 12 October 1956 (age 69); Archidona, Málaga, Spain
- Occupation: Novelist
- Writing career
- Language: Spanish
- Genres: Fantasy, Children's Literature
- Notable work: Grimpow: The Invisible Road

Rafael Ábalos (born 12 October 1956) is a Spanish author of the bestseller book Grimpow: The Invisible Road (ISBN 0385733747) published in 2007. The children's fantasy novel was about a boy finding a mysterious amulet in France who becomes a focus of a "centuries-old mission" to enlighten humanity. According to a review in Publishers Weekly, Ábalos "blends the grand-scale storytelling prowess and epic quest element of Tolkien’s The Lord of the Rings with the cryptographic intrigue of Dan Brown’s The Da Vinci Code", and gave it a positive review. The book was published by Random House.

== See also ==
- Fantasy literature
