= Ulf Löfgren =

Swedish writer and illustrator

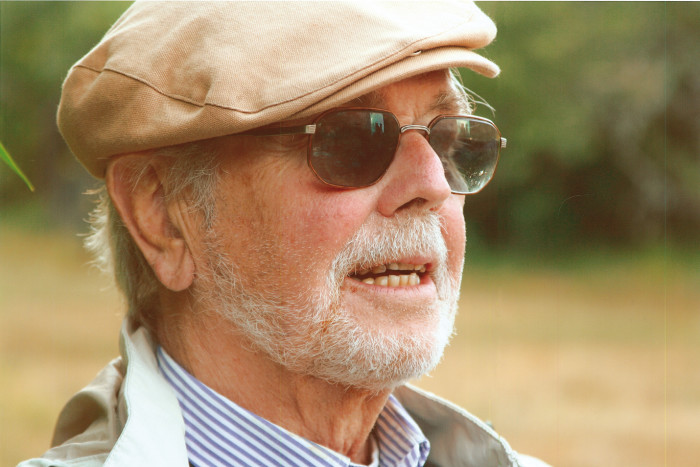
- Ulf Löfgren
- Born: October 13, 1931
- Died: October 10, 2011 (aged 79)
- Occupations: Illustrator, writer
- Writing career
- Pen name: Dr. Gyckel, och Doktor, Gyckel
- Notable work: Ludde

Ulf Löfgren (October 13, 1931, Umeå – October 10, 2011) was a Swedish illustrator and author.

== Biography ==
Ulf Löfgren studied literature history and art history at Uppsala University and obtained a Bachelor of Arts degree in 1957. He then studied graphic design and advertising at the Market Communication Program IHR from 1957 to 1958. In 1959, he made his debut as an illustrator with illustrations for Leif Krantz's Barnen i djungeln (Children in the Jungle) and was awarded the Elsa Beskow Plaque the following year for this work. He cocreated the Swedish children's program Pellepennan and Suddagumman together with Gunnel Linde. Löfgren both wrote and illustrated children's books, which were translated into twenty languages. His most well known book series are about Ludde for children aged three to five and about Albin. He also created book covers for fiction, textbooks, and other books in the 1950s, before focusing on children's literature. Löfgren's drawings are characterized by intricate details and decorative elements.

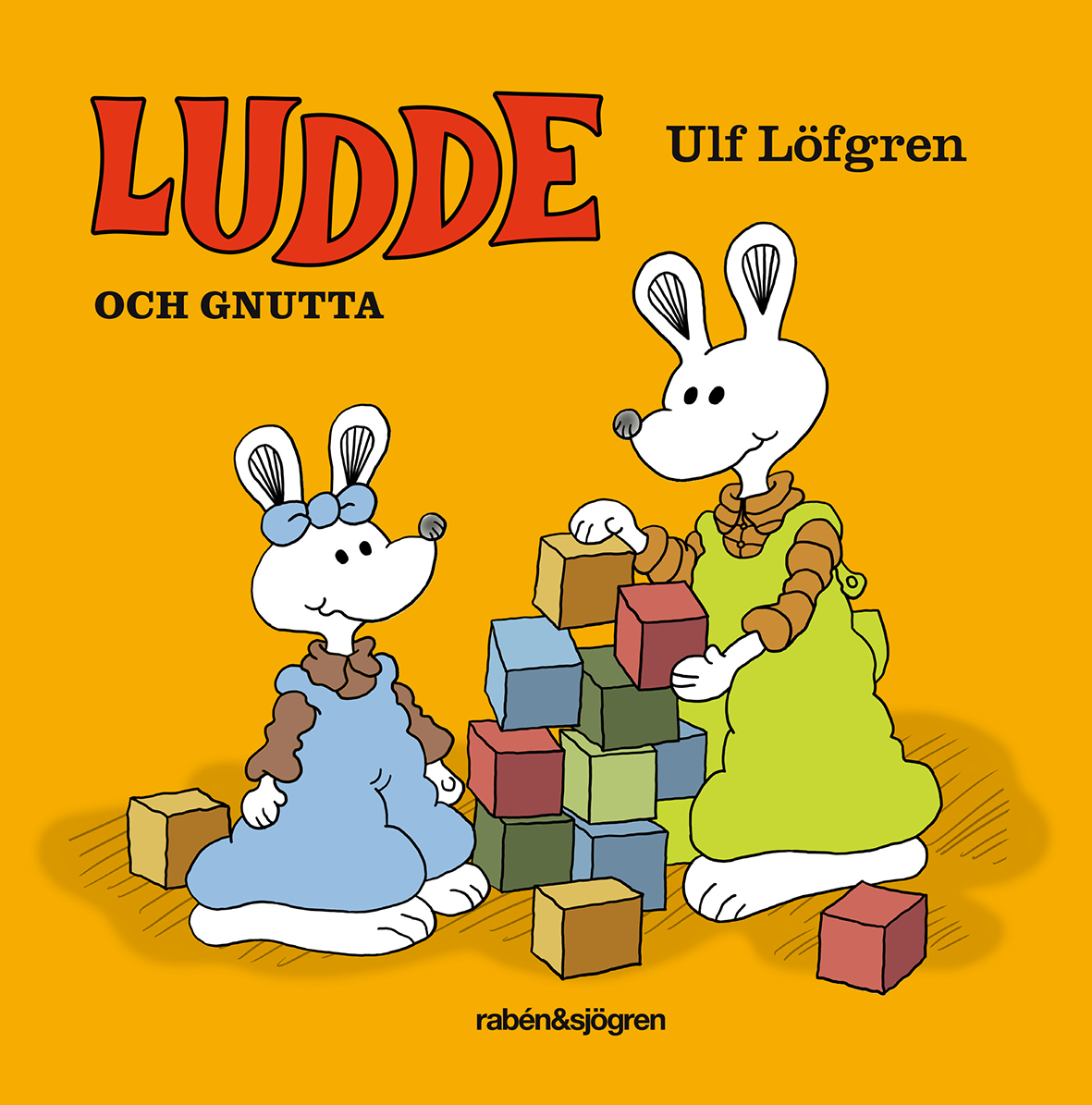
Ludde and Gnutta

He served as the chairman of the Swedish Illustrators Association from 1971 to 1974 and vice chairman of the International Board on Books for Young People (IBBY) from 1982 to 1989. Löfgren's works can be found in institutions such as the National Museum of Fine Arts in Stockholm.

== Bibliography ==
- Barnen i djungeln (Children in the Jungle) – 1959 (together with Leif Krantz)
- Goddag kung Kasper (Good day, King Kasper) – 1962
- Kung Kasper och kamelen (King Kasper and the Camel) – 1963
- Barnen i luften (Children in the Air) – 1963 (together with Leif Krantz)
- Barnen i vattnet (Children in the Water) – 1964 (together with Leif Krantz)
- Bara på skoj (Just for Fun) – 1964
- Gabriel glömmer (Gabriel Forgets) – 1965
- Den fantastiske professor Knopp (The Fantastic Professor Knopp) – 1966
- Patrik och flygmaskinen (Patrik and the Flying Machine) – 1966
- Hurra – det blev en baby! (Hooray – it's a Baby!) – 1966
- Pellepennan och Suddagumman (Pellepennan and Suddagumman) (text by Gunnel Linde) – 1968
- Patriks snabbverkstad (Patrik's Speed Workshop) 1969
- Pellepennan, Suddagumman och kluddabarnen (Pellepennan, Suddagumman, and the Scribble Children) – 1969
- Färgtrumpeten (The Color Trumpet) – 1969
- Den flygande orkestern (The Flying Orchestra) – 1969
- Det underbara trädet (The Wonderful Tree) – 1969
- 1, 2, 3 – 1970
- Vi åker året runt (We Travel All Year Round) – 1970
- Mina bokstäver (My Letters) – 1970
- Precissomduvill (Just Like You Want) –1971
- Patriks cirkus (Patrik's Circus) – 1971
- Den förtrollade draken (The Enchanted Dragon) – 1973
- Vem stoppar trafiken? (Who Stops the Traffic?) – 1973
- Albin hjälper till (Albin Helps Out) – 1975
- Tuffa gumman (Tough Granny) – 1975
- Albin är aldrig rädd (Albin Is Never Scared) – 1975
- Det finns massor med jobb! (There Are Lots of Jobs!) – 1976
- Herr Konradssons trädgård (Mr. Konradsson's Garden) – 1976
- Albin och den snurriga cykeln (Albin and the Wobbly Bicycle) – 1977
- Albin och det märkvärdiga paraplyet (Albin and the Remarkable Umbrella) – 1977
- Harlekin – 1978 (awarded the Grand Prix at the Biennal of Illustrations in Bratislava 1977)
- Tjuven (The Thief) – 1981
- Sagan om Hom (The Tale of Hom) – 1982
- Albin och trollstaven (Albin and the Magic Wand) – 1983
- Albin och regnbågen (Albin and the Rainbow) – 1983
- Albin och hans vän Ali Baba (Albin and His Friend Ali Baba) – 1983
- Albin och papegojan (Albin and the Parrot) – 1983
- Amiralen som tappade sandalen (The Admiral Who Lost His Sandal) – 1984
- Tant Ellen som åt upp karamellen (Aunt Ellen Who Ate the Caramel) – 1984
- Baronen som sköt med kanonen (The Baron Who Shot with the Cannon) – 1984
- Ludde – 1984
- Ludde och någon (Ludde and Someone) – 1984
- Kung Ludde (King Ludde) – 1984
- Sagan om de två trollstavarna (The Tale of the Two Magic Wands) – 1985
- Ludde och alla djuren (Ludde and All the Animals) – 1986
- Ludde och Gnutta – 1986
- Ludde och busiga Nalle (Ludde and Naughty Teddy) – 1986
- Barnen på La Pacanda–ön (Children on La Pacanda Island) – 1986
- Ludde får besök (Ludde Gets a Visit) – 1987
- Påhittiga Ludde (Imaginative Ludde) – 1987
- Ludde rimgissar (Ludde's Rhyme Riddles) – 1987
- Häxan Tipp och hennes elaka häxkatt (Witch Tipp and Her Mean Witch Cat) – 1987
- Ludde letar efter Nalle (Ludde Looks for Teddy) – 1988
- Ludde och vagnen (Ludde and the Carriage) – 1988
- Ludde blir glad (Ludde Gets Happy) – 1988
- Albin sjörövare (Albin the Pirate) – 1988
- Ludde och de vilda djuren (Ludde and the Wild Animals) – 1989
- Ludde och otursdagen (Ludde and the Unlucky Day) – 1989
- Ludde och telefonen (Ludde and the Telephone) – 1989
- Albin riddare (Albin the Knight) – 1989
- Ludde och flugan (Ludde and the Fly) – 1990
- Ludde kan flyga (Ludde Can Fly) – 1990
- Ludde och musen Göte (Ludde and Mouse Göte) – 1990
- Albin djurskötare (Albin the Animal Keeper) – 1990
- Kärleken förvandlar allt (Love Transforms Everything) – 1990
- Ludde och den förtrollade skogen (Ludde and the Enchanted Forest) – 1991
- Albin och de busiga tomtarna (Albin and the Mischievous Elves) – 1991
- Sagan om Tor (The Tale of Tor) – 1992
- Ludde och födelsedagen (Ludde and the Birthday) – 1993
- Ludde lagar soppa (Ludde Makes Soup) – 1993
- Ludde bygger koja (Ludde Builds a Hut) – 1993
- Cirkus Ludde (Circus Ludde) – 1993
- Ludde och orkestern (Ludde and the Orchestra) – 1994
- Ludde och utflykten (Ludde and the Excursion) – 1994
- Ludde och lådbilen (Ludde and the Boxcar) – 1994
- Bibel för barn (Bible for Children) (text Karin Karlberg, Inga Wernolf, Lisa Östh) – 1995
- Albin viking (Albin the Viking) – 1995
- Albin har en hemlighet (Albin Has a Secret) – 1996
- Snögubben Frasse (Snowman Frasse) – 1996
- Albin går till affären (Albin Goes to the Store) – 1996
- Albin säger godnatt (Albin Says Goodnight) – 1996
- Albin och tigern (Albin and the Tiger) – 1996
- Petronella och äventyret i tavlan (Petronella and the Adventure in the Painting) – 1997
- Snögubben Frasse blir konstnär (Snowman Frasse Becomes an Artist) – 1997
- Doktor Ludde (Doctor Ludde) – 1997
- Ludde och Hugo (Ludde and Hugo) – 1997
- Ludde och Gnutta i sagolandet (Ludde and Gnutta in Fairyland) – 1998
- Ludde och Hasse åker tåg (Ludde and Hasse Take a Train Ride) – 1998
- Ludde och hans vänner (Ludde and His Friends) – 1998
- Petter och den gåtfulla trädgården (Petter and the Mysterious Garden) – 1999
- Lillekatt kan många gåtor (Little Cat Knows Many Riddles) – 2000
- Gabriel och äventyret (Gabriel and the Adventure) – 2001
- Min första bok om Jesus (My First Book About Jesus) – 2002
- En bok om Jesus (A Book About Jesus) – 2002
- Ludde och café Bullen (Ludde and Café Bullen) – 2004
- Ludde leker kurragömma (Ludde Plays Hide and Seek) – 2004
- Ludde tvättar (Ludde Washes) – 2006
- Lilla stora Luddeboken (The Little Big Book of Ludde) – 2006

== Awards and honors ==
1960 – Elsa Beskow plaque

Plaques at the Biennal of Illustrations, Bratislava 1971, 1973, and 1975

Grand Prix, Biennal of Illustrations in Bratislava 1977 (for the book "Harlequin")

1991 – Knut V. Pettersson scholarship
