= Pierre Gripari =

French writer (1925–1990)

Pierre Gripari (7 January 1925, Paris – 23 December 1990, Paris) was a French writer.

== Life ==
Born to a Greek father and a mother, he was orphaned in 1944 and had to interrupt his studies and support himself with various jobs. He served in the airborne troops, from 1946 to 1949. From 1950 to 1957, he was employed by Mobil Oil, and was a delegate of the CGT trade union. He took up writing at an early age but did not consider his works fit for publishing until the late 1950s.

In 1959, he published his autobiography, Pierrot-la-lune, which was a critical success. He gained notoriety with his 1962 play Lieutenant Tenant, but his later works were commercially unsuccessful. Pierre Gripari kept publishing his books thanks to the support of publisher L'Age d'Homme, but only gained real fame and success in the late 1970s, thanks to the publishing of his children's book Contes de la rue Broca. Until his death, he was more known to French audiences as a children's author.

He was also theatre critic for the newspaper Écrits de Paris.

A member of the French communist party in the 1950s, Gripari strongly distanced himself from communism after the 1956 Khrushchev report and gradually evolved towards unconventional political ideas which could be considered far right. He was often critical of the political and religious influence of the Jews, and was branded by some critics as anti-Semitic.

Gripari was openly gay and often wrote on gay themes, but his work often borders on the surreal and includes several parodies of literary genres.

He died at St. Joseph hospital in Paris, following surgery, he was cremated at the cemetery of Pere-Lachaise 4 January 1991.
