= Keiko Sena =

Japanese children's author and illustrator (1932–2024)

Keiko Sena (Keiko Kuroda)
- せな けいこ (黒田 恵子)
- Born: December 3, 1932; Tokyo-fu, Japan
- Died: October 23, 2024 (aged 91); Kanagawa Prefecture, Japan
- Occupations: Writer; illustrator
- Writing career
- Period: 1969 – 2019
- Genre: Children's literature
- Notable works: Don't Want to Go to Bed?; I Don't Want to!; Gracie Meets a Ghost

Keiko Kuroda (黒田 恵子, Kuroda Keiko; December 3, 1932 – October 23, 2024), known by her pen name Keiko Sena (せな けいこ, Sena Keiko), was a Japanese illustrator, children's book writer, and kamishibai artist. She wrote approximately 100 books, largely published by Poplar and Fukuinkan Shoten.

Born in interwar Tokyo, Sena graduated from the all-girls Ochanomizu University Senior High School and went on to study painting under Takeo Takei, one of Japan's most prominent children's illustrators of the 20th century. She was known for her distinctive use of collage to illustrate her work. A "master storyteller", her books have been described to reveal "a deep understanding of children" and feature "charming simplicity with the satisfying bite of fairy tale grim."

== Life and work ==
Sena made her debut in 1969 at the age of 37 with her first book, Iya da iya da (いやだいやだ; lit. 'No way, no way'); it was a runaway success, and led to three more publications in the same year, including her most famous work, Nenai ko dare da (ねないこだれだ; lit. 'Who's the child who doesn't sleep?') which has sold over 3.5 million copies to-date. Along with Megane usagi (めがねうさぎ; lit. 'Glasses-wearing rabbit'), published in 1975, Sena's early books introduced many recurring characters which appear throughout her works, including Lulu, Rabbit, and Ghost. These three books, among others, were later published in English by R.I.C. Publications under the titles I Don't Want to!, Don't Want to Go to Bed?, and Gracie Meets a Ghost.

Sena often featured yōkai and obake as characters in her books. Throughout her life, she also wrote children's songs, and in 2016 published an autobiography.

Her daughter, Kaoru Kuroda, is also a children's book writer and illustrator, many of which feature her mother's characters.

== Death ==
Sena died at her home in Kanagawa Prefecture on October 23, 2024, at the age of 91.

== Awards and exhibitions ==
Sena was a member of the Japan Children's Book Artists Society and was awarded the 17th Sankei Children's Book Award in 1970. Her books are considered classics in Japan. Many remain on bestseller lists decades after publication, and can be found in bookstores across the country.

Between 2019 and 2020, an exhibition celebrating the 50th anniversary of Don't Want to Go to Bed? was held across Osaka, Aichi, Kanagawa, Hiroshima, Okayama, and Hokkaido Prefectures, hosted by The Asahi Shimbun Company. In 2020, her artwork was featured in a solo exhibition at the Hiroshima Museum of Art.
