= H. C. Cradock =

English children's writer

H.C. Cradock (born Augusta Whiteford, 1863) was an English children's book writer. She is best known for her Adventures of Josephine and Teddy Bear book series.

== Biography ==
The daughter of a Church of England clergyman, she married Rev Henry Cowper Cradock, also a Church of England clergyman and took his initials as well as his surname as her pen name. Their only child, Aline Mary, named after her mother-in-law Aline, was born in 1905.

Cradock died after suffering a stroke in Dorking on 15 October 1941.

== Bibliography ==
=== Non fiction ===
- The Care of Babies, a Reading Book for Girls (1908)
- The Training of Children from Cradle to School, a Guide for Young Mothers, Teachers and Nurses (1909)

=== The Adventures of Josephine ===
- Josephine and Her Dolls (1915)
- Josephine Keeps School
- Josephine Keeps House
- Josephine's Pantomime
- Josephine's Christmas Party
- Josephine Goes Travelling
- Josephine, John, and the Puppy
- The Bonny Book of Josephine

=== Adventures of a Teddy Bear ===
- Adventures of a Teddy Bear (1934)
- More Adventures of a Teddy Bear
- In Teddy Bear's House
- Teddy Bear's Shop
- Teddy Bear's Farm
- Pamela's Teddy Bears
