= Josep Maria Folch i Torres =

Spanish writer (1880–1950)

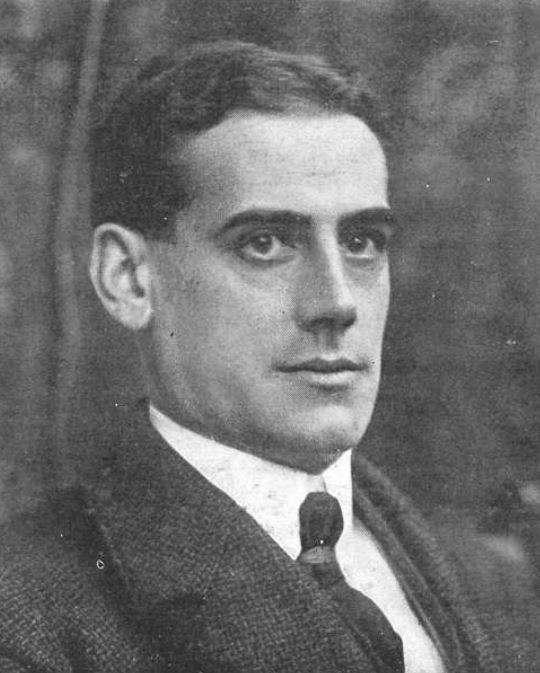
- 1912
- Born: 29 February 1880; Barcelona, Spain
- Died: 15 December 1950 (aged 70); Barcelona, Spain

Josep Maria Folch i Torres (29 February 1880 – 15 December 1950) was a Catalan language author.

He was one of the most influential authors of children's literature in Catalonia.
