= Tabaré Gómez Laborde =

Uruguayan cartoonist and illustrator (1948–2023)

- Born: 21 August 1948; La Paz, Canelones, Uruguay
- Died: 4 July 2023 (aged 74); Turdera, Lomas de Zamora, Argentina
- Other names: Tabaré
- Occupation: Cartoonist

Tabaré Gómez Laborde (21 August 1948 – 4 July 2023), also known just as Tabaré, was a Uruguayan cartoonist, caricaturist and illustrator.

== Life and career ==
Born in La Paz, Canelones, before starting his artistic career Gómez Laborde worked several years in a pizzeria and later in an advertising agency. He made his professional debut in the 1960s, as a caricaturist for the Montevideo newspaper Hechos. After collaborating with several publications, in 1974 he moved to Argentina, first collaborating with the newspaper Noticias and with the magazine Satiricón.

Gómez Laborde was best known for the comic strip Diógenes y el Linyera, which starting from 1977 ran for over 45 years and over 9,000 strips in the back cover of the newspaper Clarín. Other successful Tabaré's comics include Bicherío, Vida Interior and El Cacique Paja Brava. He also illustrated children books, created a series of over 50 animated short cartoons (Tabaré se mueve) and collaborated with French, Italian and Spanish publications.

During his career Gómez Laborde received several awards and honours, notably a Morosoli Award for his career in 2003. He was Honorary Professor of Graphic Humor at the University of Alcalá. He died of pancreatic cancer on 4 July 2023, at the age of 74.
