= Arthur Henderson Hall =

English painter

Arthur Henderson Hall (Sedgefield, County Durham, 1906 - London, 1983); ARCA (1930), RE (1961), RWS (1970), Prix de Rome in Engraving (1931), MSIA; was an English painter in oil and water-colour, draughtsman, etcher and illustrator, and glass designer.

He was educated at Sedgefield, Accrington and Coventry Schools of Art, The Royal College of Art and The British School, Rome. He was also Instructor of Drawing at London Central School of Art, in 1947–1952; Head of School of Graphic Design at the Kingston School of Art, in 1965-1971 (Senior Lecturer in charge 1952–1965). He was illustrator of children's books and books on gardening.

== Education and honors ==
- Alumnus of the Royal College of Art (1930)
- Prix de Rome in engraving (1931)
- Royal Watercolour Society (1970)
