= Eileen Browne (author) =

British writer

Eileen Browne is an author and illustrator best known for being the author of the Handa books.

== Biography ==
Browne was born in Birmingham, United Kingdom. She lived in London for more than 20 years before moving to the county of Wiltshire. Browne has worked as a school teacher and a youth worker before becoming a full-time writer and illustrator.

== Work ==
Browne's books have been praised by Early Childhood Review for including diverse characters and properly presenting different cultures, such as Kenyan life in Handa's Surprise. The Guardian also recognized Handa's Surprise as one of the "50 best culturally diverse children's books." Handa's Surprise is also noted for the use of illustrations to provide the reader with information the main character doesn't have. In 1995, Handa's Surprise was on the shortlist for the Sheffield Children's Book Award. Handa's Surprise has also been adapted into a theatre production using song and puppetry.

Browne continues to fight for diversity in children's books and media, commenting for example, on the lack of female characters in children's television. The narrative that Browne creates is a sense of inclusion, where "colour seems merely incidental."

Browne has related that she was first interested in exploring diversity in the 1980s when she lived in the Finsbury Park area of London. She was running a junior youth club that had a diverse group of children and when the children from her club asked her to put people like them in her books, Browne to realised "how important it was for them to see pictures of themselves."

== Books ==
- Boo Boo Baby and the Giraffe
- Caraway and the Cup Final
- Handa's Hen
- Handa's Surprise
- Handa's Surprising Day
- Handa's Noisy Night
- In a Minute
- Mary Had a Dinosaur
- Nicki
- No Problem
- Through My Window
- Tick Tock
- Up the Tree
- Wait and See
- Wait for Me!
- Where's That Bus?
- Winnie Wagtail
