= Nicoletta Costa =

Italian writer, illustrator and cartoonist

- Born: Nicoletta Costa; 1953 (age 72–73); Trieste, Italy
- Occupations: Writer, illustrator, cartoonist
- Years active: 1970s–present
- Known for: her children's books
- Awards: Andersen Prize (1989, 1994, 2010)

Nicoletta Costa (Italian pronunciation: [nikoˈletta ˈkɔsta]; born 1953) is an Italian writer, illustrator and cartoonist, famous for her works of children's literature. She is the creator of characters Olga the Cloud and Julian Rabbit. Costa is renowned for her distinctive drawing style, distinguished by "characterized forms and bright colours." She is the recipient of many awards, including three Andersen Prizes. Her books have been translated into several languages, including English, Spanish, and Japanese.

An animated TV series, based on Costa's Giulio Coniglio and authored by Costa, debuted on Rai YoYo on September 29, 2017. Costa is one of the most published authors of children's books in Italy. Her characters Olga the Cloud and Julian Rabbit (Giulio coniglio) are considered two of the most popular characters among Italian children today, alongside Pimpa and Peppa Pig. It has been stated that Olga the Cloud was "a worldwide editorial success since its conception [in the early 1980s], not only in Italy, but allover the world, particularly China, Russia, Spain, and the United States." After Julian Rabbit, another TV series by Costa is currently in production. Nina & Olga, centred on Costa's Olga the Cloud, is set to debut on RAI in the spring of 2021.

== Biography ==
Costa was born in Trieste, Friuli-Venezia Giulia, Italy, in 1953. She enjoyed drawing ever since her childhood, and at twelve she illustrated her first book, titling it Il pesciolino piccolo. The work was first published in Trieste for the series Il Zibaldone.

She earned a degree in architecture from the University of Venice in 1978. Upon earning her degree, she started working in the study of her father. Costa said that she liked her job, but she soon found out that her true passion was writing and illustrating children's books, so, after publishing a number of children's books, she decided to pursue her passion.

Costa started her career as an illustrator two years after graduation. As of today, she has illustrated and written dozens of children's books.

Costa has also collaborated with several companies in the creation of stationery, toys, and clothes. She collaborated with UNICEF for the illustration of Christmas cards, and designed several baby clothes lines for Benetton. Costa has also collaborated with Italian supermarket chain Coop; with her characters, notably Olga the Cloud, appearing on Coop's baby products.

A TV series based on Costa's character Julian Rabbit debuted on Rai YoYo in 2017. The character was already well known to Italian children and in the Italian literary world, and it was created by Costa several years earlier. After the release of the TV series, the character became the "beniamino dei bambini." Beside appearing in Costa's books, such as Julian Rabbit and the Chicks, or Julio Bunny and the Chicks (Giulio coniglio e i pulcini), Julian Rabbit is also the title character of a play written by Costa. The production debuted in 2010 and was warmly received. It returned to Italian theatres the following year.

Costa still lives and works in her city of birth, Trieste.

== Works ==
Costa's direct style is characterized by "smooth lines, black stroke as an outline, bright colours, and happy and radiant characters." She has completed over 400 books. Her best known characters are Olga the Cloud (La nuvola Olga), Blue Bear (Orso Blu), Catherine the Goose (L'oca Caterina), Theodora the Witch (La strega Teodora), John the Tree (L'albero Giovanni or El árbol Juan), Margaret the Teacher (La maestra Margherita), Cats (I gatti), Mr Kite (Il signor Aquilone), and Julio Bunny, or Julian Rabbit. Olga the Cloud appears in Costa's sketches dating from the time she was studying at the university. Olga is described as a cloud who lets go of rain that she can't hold. Julian Rabbit, who is the title character of the series airing on Rai YoYo, has been described as "an antihero par excellence," who is shy and awkward, but "loves to surround himself with friends." He is "scared of water, of darkness, and is very shy, but also capable of building relationships. Around him moves a kind of tribe, wherein the typology typical of any group of kids is to be found: there is the awkward kid, the bully, the know-it-all; every one has their particular personality, to which is easy for kids to relate, and perhaps not only just for them." Speaking of the TV series, whose key message is mutual aid, Costa has stated: "[Julian the Rabbit's] stories teach kids that you get things done only with the help of friends." Julian Rabbit's stories started in books, were later adapted to play, and later still became a TV series. In 2014, a magazine dedicated to Julian Rabbit reached its 100th issue. In 2018 Julian Rabbit's stories were published in a series of 25 bundles of coloring books with stickers published by Repubblica and sold as supplement with the newspaper across 25 weeks.

After Julian Rabbit, another TV series on Costa's characters is currently in production at RAI. The series, titled Nina & Olga, centred on Costa's character Olga the Cloud, is set to be released in the spring of 2021.

Costa has also created books illustrating the alphabet, which she represented with her "unmistakable and unique style." The latter books are appreciated especially by Italian teachers. Costa's books are often used to introduce kids to reading in Italy, and have been used for this purpose to some extent also in other countries, including the United States, in Chicago's Italo-American community.

== Awards ==
Costa has received several awards, including the 1989, 1994 and 2010 Andersen Prize. Her awards include:

Year	Title
1986	Premio Catalonia d’Illustraciòn (Barcelona)
1988	Golden Pen of Belgrade
1989	Andersen Prize Baia delle favole for her series Libri tuttofare
1994	Andersen Prize for best author
1998	Andersen Prize Baia delle favole for her series Per cominciare
1998	Alpi Apuane Award for the book Martino, un gatto e un violino (story by Silvia Camodeca)
2002	Grinzane Junior Award for the book Un anno con Giulio coniglio
2010	Andersen Prize Baia delle favole for best author
