= Rod Campbell =

Scottish author and illustrator

Rod Campbell (born 4 May 1945) is a Scottish author and illustrator of several popular children's books including the classic lift-the-flap board book Dear Zoo.

Born in Scotland in 1945, he was brought up in Zimbabwe and returned to Britain where he completed a doctorate in organic chemistry. In 1980 he became involved in children's publishing where he began designing innovative books with interactive elements and repetitive phrases.

In 1987 he founded Campbell Blackie Books in partnership with his publisher Blackie. Campbell Books (as it became in 1989) was sold in 1995 to Macmillan Publishers.

== Dear Zoo ==
Campbell's most famous work is Dear Zoo, first published in 1982. Campbell says that he was inspired by seeing other early lift-the-flap books, such as Spot the Dog, and wanted to incorporate the flaps into a story so that they made sense. He then thought of explorers sending animals to zoos years ago in crates, and hit upon the structure of each flap being a container holding a different animal.

Popular among the under 5s in Britain, the book has been translated into Albanian, Arabic, Bengali, Chinese, Persian, French, Gujarati, Hindi, Panjabi, Portuguese, Russian, Simplified Chinese, Somali, Spanish, Turkish, Urdu, and Vietnamese, as well as being published in a number of formats and alongside various merchandise.

A spin-off Christmas title, Dear Santa, was first published in 2004 and follows the same format, with different gifts being considered by Santa hidden under flaps.

In 2017, the 35th anniversary of Dear Zoo was celebrated through a partnership with London Zoo and the publication of an Anniversary Edition in a slipcase format.

== Notable works ==
- Dear Zoo
- Dear Santa
- ABC Zoo
- Oh Dear!
- It's Mine!
- I'm Hungry!
- I Won't Bite!
- Baby's Busy Book
- My Presents
- Noisy Farm
- Farm 123
- Farm Babies
- Buster's Day
- Buster's Zoo
- Here's Buster, But Where's Teddy?
- Buster Goes To Playschool
- Buster Gets Dressed
- Buster Keeps Warm
- Buster's Bedtime
- The Pop-Up Farm
- The Pop-Up Jungle
