= Elina Karjalainen =

Aili Elina Karjalainen (née. Saraste, 3 June 1927 Viipuri – 14 August 2006 Kuopio) was a journalist and author from Finland. She is best known for books for children.

The protagonist of many of Karjalainen's books is Uppo-Nalle, a teddybear who loves poetry. The first Uppo-Nalle book was published in 1977. It was followed by 21 other Uppo-Nalle books. Karjalainen wrote also biographies, a crime novel and other books, in total around 40 books.

As a journalist Karjalainen worked for Savon Sanomat and Suomen Kuvalehti as well as a freelancer. She was interested in people, and wrote many reportages about life of ordinary people outside of big cities.

Karjalainen got the passion to read from her childhood home in Viipuri. Her need to write emerged from series of crisis she encountered in age of eleven: First her mother died, then Winter War started and all Finns had to leave Viipuri.
