= Paro Anand =

Indian writer

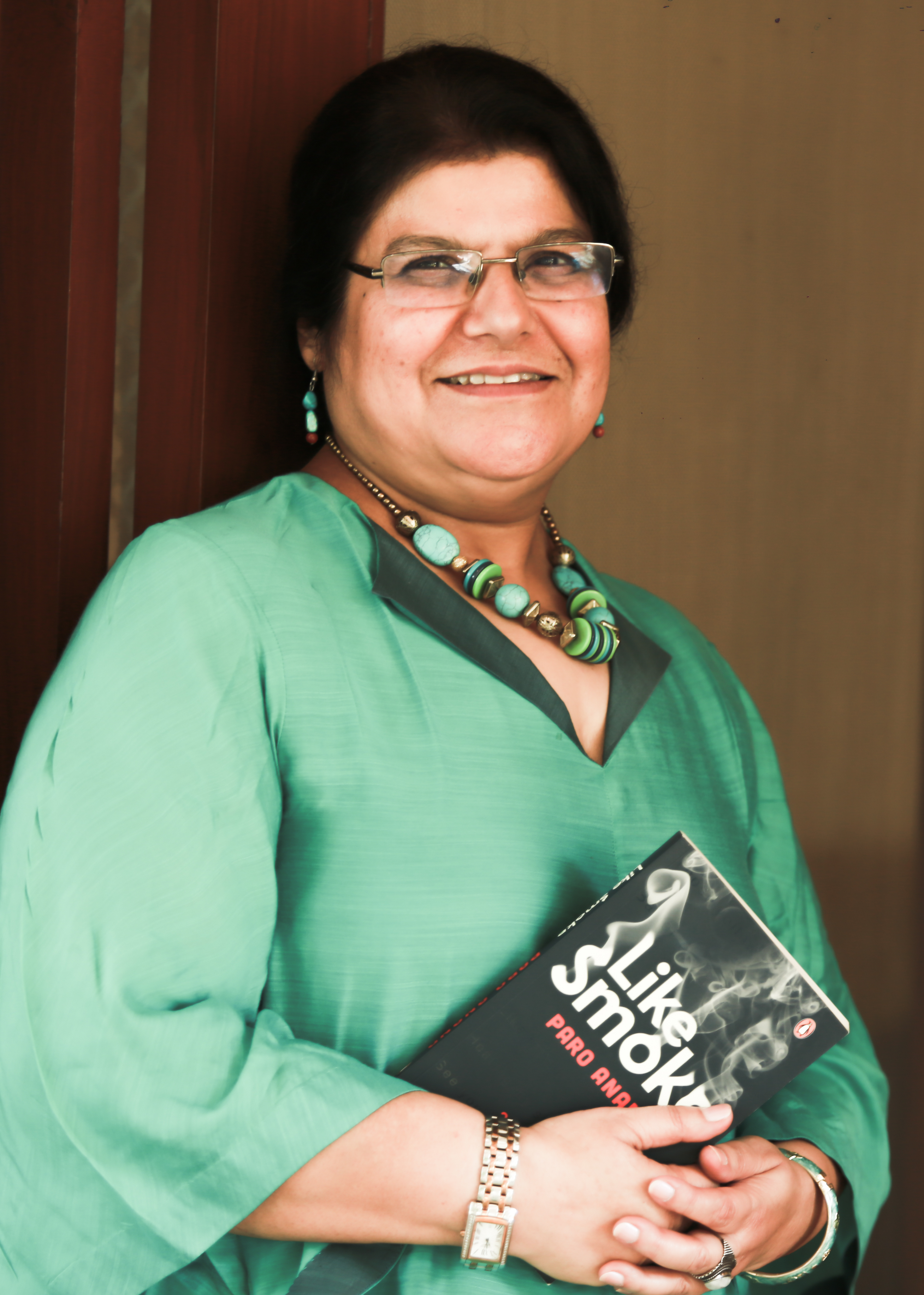
- Anand at a Talking Books event in 2019
- Occupation: Novelist
- Writing career
- Genres: Children's literature, young adult
- Notable awards: Sahitya Akademi Bal Sahitya Puraskar
- Website: paroanand.com

Paro Anand is an Indian author of books for children, young adults and adults including novels, short stories and plays.She did her Bachelor's in Sociology from Miranda House, University of Delhi. She won the Sahitya Akademi Bal Sahitya Puruskar in 2017 for her anthology Wild Child and Other Stories (now published as "Like Smoke: 20 Teens 20 Stories"). She has spoken about and written extensively on children's literature in India. She headed the National Centre for Children's Literature at the National Book Trust India, the apex body for children's literature in India. She also runs a podcast on Hubhopper called Literature in Action, and was an invitee to the India Conference at the Harvard Business School in 2018.

== Writing ==
In an interview with The Hindu, Anand said that she was working as a drama teacher when she realized that there were not many Indian works for Indian students to adapt. "There were only very archaic or Western scripts for performance. I couldn’t find the kind of plays I wanted to do with today's Indian children, so I started writing them and then found there weren’t many storybooks that fitted my brief either. So I started writing those."

Anand's writing covers topics such as communal hatred, failure, sexual abuse and being different, and is often intended for a young audience.

== Translations ==
Anand's book No Guns at My Son's Funeral made it to the IBBY Honors List of 2006 and has been translated into Spanish and German.

== Awards and recognitions ==
Anand won the National Sahitya Akademi Bal Sahitya Puraskar in 2017 for her collection of short stories, Wild Child and Other Stories (now published as "Like Smoke: 20 Teens 20 Stories"). In 2019, she was conferred the Kalinga Karubaki Award of the Kalinga Literary Festival.
