= Fernando Krahn =

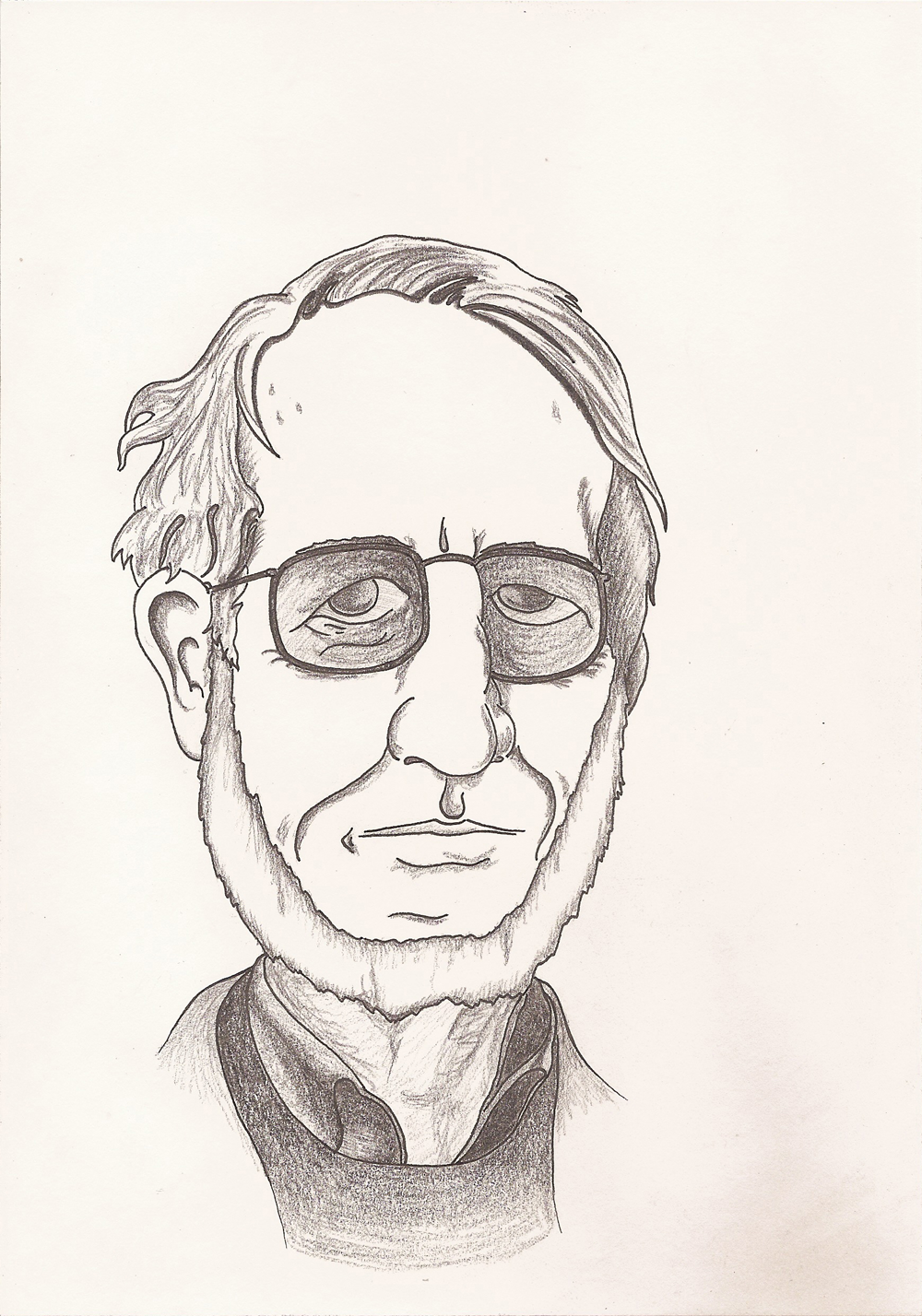
- Portrait of Fernando Krahn
- Born: 1935; Santiago de Chile
- Died: 18 February 2010 (aged 74–75); Barcelona
- Occupations: Painter, cartoonist, plastic artist
- Spouse: María de la Luz Uribe
- Children: Fernanda, Mathias, Santiago
- Parent: Otto Krahn
- Website: www.krahnfactory.com

Fernando Krahn (1935 – 18 February 2010) was a Chilean cartoonist and plastic artist. A celebrated cartoonist, his works were published in Esquire, The New Yorker, The Atlantic and The Reporter. In 1973 he was forced to flee his native country Chile to escape persecution after the 1973 Chilean coup d'état. Upon moving to Spain, he had over 40 children's books published, which earned him the SM Ediciones' International Illustration Prize in 2001.

== Biography ==
Krahn was born in Santiago de Chile. His first drawings date from the period between 1952 and 1956, but his professional career, as a cartoonist and artist, did not start until 1961, in New York City, where he lived until 1969; during this time he had his cartoons published in magazines such as Esquire, The New Yorker, The Atlantic (then The Atlantic Monthly) and The Reporter He would return to his country in 1971, where he worked for the magazine Ercilla, but in 1973 had to move to Sitges, Spain, in order to escape from the September 11 coup d'état. After receiving a fellowship from the John Simon Guggenheim Memorial Foundation, he was able to produce his first animated film, El crimen perfecto, in 1976. In 1984, he began to work for the Barcelona's newspaper La Vanguardia, where he would publish cartoons and works of animation for the rest of his life.

Krahn contributed to newspapers such as El País, International Herald Tribune, Die Zeit and La Repubblica. He authored and illustrated more than forty children's books published in the United States, Spain, Chile and Venezuela; this work earned him the SM Ediciones' International Illustration Prize in 2001. Besides his work as an illustrator, he led Krahnfactory, an animated motion studio where he acted as scriptwriter and producer. There have been a few exhibitions devoted to his work: in 2006 Sabadell held one which was focused on his early work and Lleida hosted another one in 2008.

== Personal life and death ==
Fernando had a daughter, called Fernanda, and two sons Santiago and Matias and he was married to Chilean writer María de la Luz Uribe, who died in 1994. Some of his wife's books were illustrated by him and her death is said to have influenced his later work. Krahn died in Barcelona on 18 February 2010 of an intestinal ischemia.
