= Honor C. Appleton =

British illustrator of children's books

Illustration by Honor C. Appleton from Dumpy Proverbs, 1903

Honor Charlotte Appleton (1879–1951) was a British illustrator of children's books, including The Children's Alice. She had a delicate watercolour style, influenced by Kate Greenaway and others.

== Biography ==
She was born in Brighton, on the south coast of England, on 4 February 1879, to John Hoblyn Appleton (1833-1881), a parish priest, and Georgina Rachel Maud Appleton nee Wilkie (1856-1939) and lived in nearby Hove most of her life. She had two sisters and a brother. She studied art at the Kensington School, Frank Calderon's School of Animal Painting and the Royal Academy of Arts.

She died at the Brooklands Nursing Home at Haywards Heath on 30 December 1951. She never married. Appleton left an estate valued at £9302 15s 5d.

== Works ==
Appleton illustrated more than 150 books in the course of her career. They included the fairytales of Charles Perrault and Hans Christian Andersen, William Blake's Songs of Innocence and a retold version of Alice's Adventures in Wonderland, The Children's Alice.

Her watercolours were exhibited at the Royal Academy, and there was a memorial exhibition of her work at Hove Library in 1952.
