= Frederick Grice =

British children's writer

- Born: 21 June 1910; Brandon, County Durham, England
- Died: 8 February 1983 (aged 72)
- Education: King's College, London; Durham University
- Occupations: Writer, teacher
- Writing career
- Language: English
- Genre: Children's literature
- Notable work: The Bonny Pit Laddie (1960)

Frederick Grice (21 June 1910 – 8 February 1983) was a British author who specialised in children's literature. Grice wrote 20 books, the best known of which is The Bonny Pit Laddie (1960).

== Early life and education ==
Born in Brandon and educated in Durham at Johnston School, Grice read English at King's College, London (1928–1931), where he graduated with a first-class degree.

He subsequently returned to Durham to complete his teacher training at the local university (1931–1932). He was employed as an assistant master at A.J. Dawson School in County Durham from 1934 to 1940. During the Second World War he served in the Royal Air Force as a Flight Lieutenant in a small mobile radar unit (Unit 606) that was attached to the Eighth Army in North Africa and operated out of a single lorry.

== Career ==
Set in the northern England of the 1920s, The Bonny Pit Laddie is the story of an aspirational teenage boy in a County Durham mining village experiencing a pit strike. Standing out for its realism and "unsentimental" style, it was runner-up for the 1961 Carnegie Medal. Working-class children's stories were notably rare at the time of its publication.

Concurrent to his writing career, Grice lectured in English at Worcester Teacher Training College. Before his death he had taken an interest in the clergyman diarist Francis Kilvert, which culminated in the publication of Francis Kilvert and his World. Water Breaks Its Neck, a "simple but eventful" story of a shepherd boy set in the Radnorshire hills Grice became familiar with during his research on Kilvert, was published posthumously in 1986.

In 2015, Grice's wartime diaries and notebooks were published as War's Nomads: A Mobile Radar Unit in Pursuit of Rommel During the Western Desert Campaign, 1942–3, edited by his daughter Gillian Clarke and her husband, Colin Clarke.

=== Critical reception ===
For his body of work Grice received the 1977 Children's Rights Workshop Other Award. His best known book, The Bonny Pit Laddie, was praised for being a story of the "ordinary working man" and featuring a "raw sense of injustice" reminiscent of Geoffrey Trease.

As a writer, he was singled out for his ability to create interesting characters and atmosphere, though his plot construction and "maintenance of tension" was less successful. He also received criticism for his perceived lack of interest in depicting female characters, especially in Aidan and the Strollers, which is a theatrical story set among a troupe of travelling actors and where the strong presence of an actress character might be expected.

== Personal ==
Grice married Gwendoline Simpson in 1939, with whom he had two daughters. He was an active member of the Hatfield Association — the Hatfield College, Durham alumni society.

He died on 8 February 1983.

== Selected publications ==
=== Fiction ===
- Grice, Frederick (1960). Aidan and the Strollers. London: Jonathan Cape.
- ——— (1960). The Bonny Pit Laddie (1st ed.). London: Oxford University Press.
- ——— (1962). The Moving Finger. London: Oxford University Press. ISBN 9780192711953.
- ——— (1964). A Severnside Story (1st ed.). London: Oxford University Press.
- ——— (1968). The Oak and the Ash. London: Oxford University Press. ISBN 9780192712790.
- ——— (1969). The Courage of Andy Robson (1st ed.). London: Oxford University Press. ISBN 9780192712929.
- ——— (1972). Young Tom Sawbones. London: Oxford University Press. ISBN 9780192713391.
- ——— (1976). Nine Days' Wonder. London: Oxford University Press. ISBN 9780192713940.
- ——— (1986). Water Breaks Its Neck. Oxford: Oxford University Press. ISBN 9780192715357.

=== Non-fiction ===
- Grice, Frederick (1967). Dildrum, King of the Cats, and Other English Folk Stories. London: Oxford University Press.
- ——— (1982). Francis Kilvert and His World. London: Caliban. ISBN 9780904573787.
