= The Bed and Breakfast Star =

1994 novel by Jacqueline Wilson

- First edition
- Author: Jacqueline Wilson
- Illustrator: Nick Sharratt
- Cover artist: Nick Sharratt
- Language: English
- Genre: Children's novel
- Published: 1994 Doubleday
- Publication place: United Kingdom
- Media type: Print
- Pages: 208 pp
- ISBN: 978-0-440-86324-3

The Bed and Breakfast Star is a children's novel by British author Jacqueline Wilson.

== Plot ==
The Bed and Breakfast Star is narrated by Elsa, a cheerful ten-year-old girl loves to tell jokes, particularly to cheer up the people around her. As a child, Elsa lived happily with her mother until her mother fell in love with "Mack the Smack," a Scotsman whom Elsa dislikes because he is extremely short-tempered and, as the nickname suggests, frequently uses smacking as a punishment. Elsa's mother married Mack and they had two children: Pippa, Elsa's five-year-old half-sister, and Hank, her infant half-brother.

Mack is unable to keep a job for more than a short period. As a result, the family are often evicted and must move house several times, including in with Mack's mother in Scotland. Eventually, they are forced to move into a bed and breakfast ironically named "The Royal Hotel", which used to be a grand palace but has become poorly maintained by ambivalent staff. Elsa nicknames the hotel "The Oyal Htl" due to the missing lettering on the hotel front. Elsa watches her family become increasingly disheartened and downtrodden as they are forced to live in one room and stigmatized due to their status. She tries to help by making jokes, but this is not usually appreciated.

Elsa joins the local school but dislikes it and sometimes plays truant with Funny-Face, a boy at the hotel whom she grudgingly becomes friends with. Elsa also grows close to a girl called Naomi, who later gets the Royal Hotel in trouble due to a TV interview that was arranged by Mack.

One night, Elsa discovers that a fire has broken out in the hotel. She saves the guests by waking them up, with her loud voice finally becoming a strength. Elsa becomes a star and is interviewed by many reporters. Because of the damage caused by the fire, Elsa and her family temporarily move into "The Star Hotel", a very well-managed place. The book ends with Elsa telling jokes to the readers.

== Characters ==
=== Main ===
- Elsa – The book's narrator, aged ten years old. She constantly tells jokes, and dreams of being a comedian when she is older. Her best friends are Naomi and Funny-face, and she is close to her half-sister Pippa. She is named after Elsa the lioness and has a lion's mane of ginger hair.
- Pippa – Elsa's younger half-sister, aged four. She often misses the point in Elsa's jokes and cannot remember the words or tune to any song.
- Mack – Elsa's stepfather, whom Elsa calls "Mack the Smack" due to his verbal and physical abuse. He is described as a physically imposing Scotsman with sticking-up blond hair. After losing his job and being unable to find work, he and his family are forced to live at the Royal Hotel.
- Mum – Elsa's unnamed mother, who becomes depressed after her family's move to the Royal Hotel. She is described as a slim brunette with a ponytail.
- Naomi – Elsa's first friend at the Royal Hotel. At the start of the book, she has lived in the Royal Hotel for six months, with her mother and younger brothers. She loves reading scary vampire books under the guise of the dust jacket of Little Women.
- "Funny-face" – A boy who is part of the "Famous Five" group of hard lads in the hotel. He laughs at Elsa's jokes and lives with his mother on the fourth floor. His real name is never mentioned.
- Hank – Elsa's baby half-brother, nicknamed "Hank the Hunk" by Elsa as he is large for his age.

=== Other ===
- The Manager – The manager of The Royal Hotel, who does not care about the guests or their wellbeing.
- The "Bunny" Receptionist – The receptionist, who constantly flirts with the manager and shares his attitude regarding the guests. She is nicknamed by Elsa for her fluffy sweaters.
- Mrs. "Hoover" McPherson – The cleaner, who expresses care for the guests. She is fond of Elsa and Pippa, both of whom help her with the housework.
- "The Famous Five" – The gang that Elsa plays truant with after she struggles to settle in her new school.
- "Simple" Simon – A five-year-old boy who tags along with the Famous Five.
- Ms. Fisher – The teacher of the special class in the local primary school, described as mean and uninspiring.
- Nicky, Neil, and Nathan – Naomi's younger brothers.
- Naomi's mother – Described by Elsa as kind and a good cook.
- The Switchboard – A woman who is polite but unhelpful, sharing the attitude of the manager and receptionist towards guests. She enjoys Jackie Collins and sweets.

== Additional Information ==
The book was originally named Elsa, Star of the Shelter, but it was renamed in reprints.
