= Fritz Mühlenweg =

German painter (1898–1961)

Fritz Mühlenweg (also Fritz Muhlenweg; 11 December 1898 – 13 September 1961) was a German painter and author. His most famous book is In geheimer Mission durch die Wüste Gobi (part one in English Big Tiger and Compass Mountain), published in 1950. It was later shortened and translated into English under the title Big Tiger and Christian.

== Early life ==
Fritz Mühlenweg was born in 1898 as a son of a chemist in Konstanz. He was educated as a chemist in Bielefeld and took over the family business after his father died. He left Konstanz in 1926 for Berlin. There, Mühlenweg began to work as an accountant for Deutsche Luft Hansa, a newly formed airline company.

== Work with Luft Hansa ==
In 1927, Luft Hansa contributed to the Sino-Swedish expedition to Central and South Asia, following plans for an airline connection between Berlin and Beijing. With Sven Hedin as their guide, the expedition would check out meteorological conditions. Mühlenweg joined to expedition as the financial and materials manager from 1927 to 1928. He returned for a second trip to Central Asia in the winter of 1929-1930. In 1931, Mühlenweg took his last and longest trip to the area, to observe weather conditions with a German meteorologist in the Gobi Desert.

== Career in art ==
In 1932, Mühlenweg joined the Academy of Fine Arts in Vienna and studied painting, but soon dropped out. In Vienna he met his future spouse, Elisabeth Kopriva. In 1934, after their wedding, the couple moved to Allensbach, where both worked as independent artists. During World War II, Mühlenweg was drafted as a customs officer guarding the Swiss border. The Mühlenwegs had seven children.

He started publishing literary works in 1946. His greatest success, In geheimer Mission durch die Wüste Gobi, was published in 1950 as the two parts Großer-Tiger und Kompaß-Berg and Null Uhr fünf in Urumtschi. The juvenile adventure novel was set in China and Mongolia, and was based on the experiences Mühlenweg collected during his expeditions.

Mühlenweg died in Allensbach in 1961 from the effects of a stroke. His wife survived him less than two days.

== Works ==
- In geheimer Mission durch die Wüste Gobi (heute Großer-Tiger und Christian), Freiburg
  - Teil 1. Großer-Tiger und Kompaß-Berg, 1950
  - Teil 2. Null Uhr fünf in Urumtschi, 1950
- Das Tal ohne Wiederkehr oder Die Reise von Magog nach Gog, Freiburg 1952
- Nuni, Freiburg 1953
- Das kleine Buch vom Bodensee, Konstanz 1954 (zusammen mit Lotte Eckner)
- Kasperl mit der Winduhr, Freiburg 1956
- In jenen Tagen, Freiburg i.Br. 1957
- Der Familienausflug, Freiburg i.Br. 1960
- Das Schloß des Drachenkönigs, Freiburg i.Br. 1961
- Echter und falscher Zauber, Freiburg i. Br. 1963
- Kleine mongolische Heimlichkeiten, Bottinghofen am Bodensee 1992
- Fremde auf dem Pfad der Nachdenklichkeit, Lengwil am Bodensee 1992
- In geheimer Mission durch die Wüste Gobi, Lengwil am Bodensee 1993 (ungekürzte Neuauflage)
- Malerei, Lengwil 1999
- Mongolische Heimlichkeiten, Lengwil 2002
- Drei Mal Mongolei: Dampignak und andere Erzählungen; Reisetagebücher und Briefe aus der Sven-Hedin-Expedition durch die Innere Mongolei, Hrsg. Ekkehard Faude und Regina Mühlenweg, Lengwil 2006

=== As editor ===
- Magdalena Steinerin: Clara und Franciscus von Assisi, Konstanz 1959

=== Translations ===
- Dino Buzzati: Das Königreich der Bären, Freiburg i. Br. 1962
- Louise Fatio: Der glückliche Löwe, Freiburg 1955
- Louise Fatio: Der glückliche Löwe in Afrika, Freiburg 1956
- Louise Fatio: Das glückliche Löwenkind, Freiburg i.Br. 1960
- Louise Fatio: Eine Puppe für Marie, Freiburg i. Br. 1959
- Louise Fatio: Zwei glückliche Löwen, Freiburg 1957
- Janice: Die Ente Angelina, Freiburg i. Br. 1961
- Nicholas Kalashnikoff: Turgen, der Jäger, Freiburg 1957
- Nancy Lord: Ich und mein Hund, Freiburg i. Br. [u.a.] 1959
- Tausendjähriger Bambus, Hamburg 1946 / Neuauflage, Lengwil 1994

=== Exhibition catalogue ===
- Ausstellungskatalog Das Land des Blauen Himmels – Fritz Mühlenweg in der Mongolei. Libelle Verlag Lengwil am Bodensee 2005. ISBN 3-905707-02-0.
