= Claude Ponti =

French children's author and illustrator

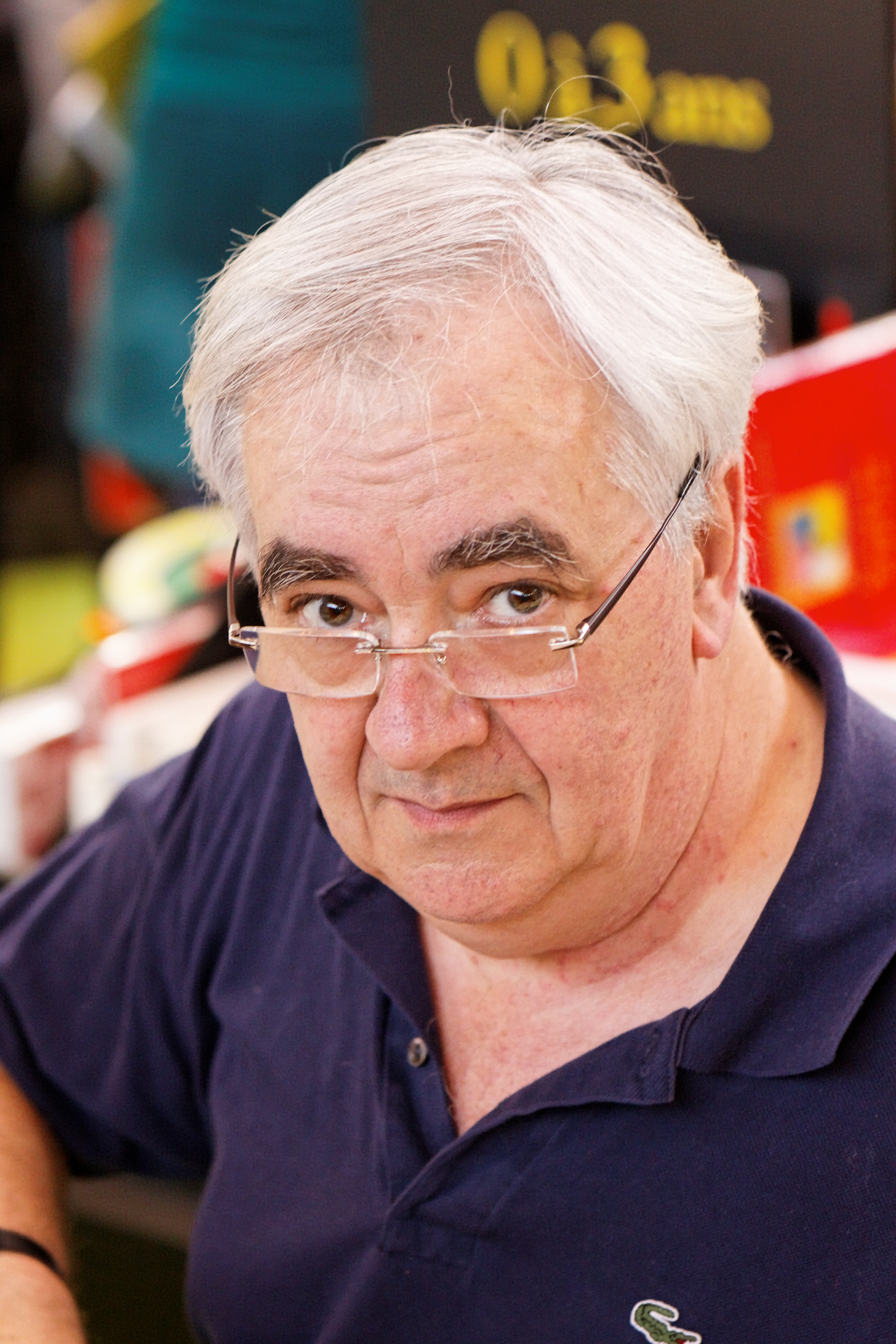
- Claude Ponti in March 2011
- Born: Claude Ponticelli; November 22, 1948; Lunéville, Lorraine, France
- Education: Art school - Literature and archaeology studies
- Known for: Children's author and illustrator
- Children: Adèle Ponticelli
- Awards: Prix Sorcières (2006); SGDL Grand Prix pour l'Œuvre (2025)

Claude Ponticelli, known as Claude Ponti, was born on November 22, 1948, in Lunéville (Lorraine, France). He is a French children’s author and illustrator. His books feature detailed illustrations and imaginative narratives. Several recurring characters, such as Blaise the masked chick, have become recognizable within French children’s literature.

== Early life ==
Claude Ponti was born as the middle of three boys, between his older brother Alain, and younger brother Michel. His father was a “chrono-analyst” (or Time-motion study analyst), and his mother was a teacher. He later recalled his time in kindergarten, with a teacher trained on the Germaine Tortel method, where a teacher trained in the Germaine Tortel method encouraged drawing, and additional activities were organized by the teacher’s husband.

At six years old, Claude Ponti was raped by his maternal grandfather, a World War 1 veteran. He disclosed the abuse years later, at the age of 25. His parents refused to believe him and asked him to leave the family home. At the age of eight, his family moved to the Vosges countryside, where he lived in a rural environment and spent time around farm animals. He is left-handed, and mildly dyslexic.

After obtaining his diploma in 1967, Claude Ponti then attended a Fine Arts school in Aix-en-Provence. He later studied literature and archaeology in Strasbourg, before moving to Paris.

From 1968 to 1984, he worked for the French newspaper L’Express, initially as a courier and later as a cartoonist. During this period, he exhibited paintings at a gallery in Paris between 1972 and 1978. He also produced illustrations for children’s literature publishers. In the early 1980's, he was the artistic director of the Imagerie of Épinal.

== Career ==
The birth of his daughter, Adèle, in 1985, marked the beginning of his career as a children’s author. His earliest works were created for his daughter. In 1986, after Gallimard editor Geneviève Brisac reviewed his work, L’Album d’Adèle was published. Brisac later became a publisher at L’École des loisirs, where Ponti subsequently published most of his books. Adèle Ponticelli later became a podcast producer for Le Monde and has collaborated with her father on projects, including a fiction podcast produced for ARTE Radio.

Many illustrators, including Claude Ponti in 2000 and 2001, created original artwork for Françoise Mouly and Art Spiegelman's Little Lit children's book anthology. Mouly and Spiegelman's Toon Books have published some of Ponti's work, starting in 2012. That same year, Ponti and Spiegelman, along with Lorenzo Mattotti, drew a six-handed lithographe illustration together, at the Salon du livre.

In 2009, with some friends, Ponti created Le Muz (later renamed La Venture - Le Muz), an online virtual museum and voluntary association, which displays children's works from across the world, as well as aids and announces many real-life events revolving around child art, and projects by Claude Ponti and other artists, educators, psychologists and researchers. Le Muz's mission statement is “To valorise the creativity of children and their works, as well as collect and broadcast them” and that “Children's works should be visible, preserved, valued, accessible to everyone, children and adults, anytime and anywhere in the world”. As of 2025, Le Muz has over eighty people listed as having helped contribute to its founding and/or continued development, and its site hosts nearly 5000 artworks by children.

While known more for children's books, Claude Ponti has also written for adult audiences. His first adult-readers novel, Les Pieds-Bleus, is about a rural boy named Hercule, in the 1960's, who is harassed, physically and sexually abused, but nonetheless enjoys playing, running wild, and being full of imagination.

In a 2014 article for Libération, Ponti criticised Jean-François Copé, then-president of the center-right UMP political party, for Copé's remarks against Claire Franek's children's book Tous à Poil! (English translation: All Naked!), on nakedness and human bodies. Copé said that reading it made his blood stop flowing, that UMP leaders had to say “enough!”, and wrongfully-claimed the book was part of official recommended teaching aids for primary education teachers. Ponti said “Criticising a children's book without understanding it is dumb”, and added that this insulted the adult family members and librarians who read and understood the books, and who chose to give them to children in their family or library.

The Institut Français' November 2015 South Ken Kids Festival, in London, hosted a drawing panel with both Claude Ponti and Tony Ross, around the topic of Alice in Wonderland during the book's 150th anniversary.

Ponti illustrated the inside of the 2022 album Consolation for singer Pomme, who had been a huge fan of Ponti from her childhood, and whose mushroom hat, worn for the album's cover, references the author's work.

A couple of Claude Ponti's earliest children's books, are credited as written by Mona Ponti (or Monique Ponticelli), and illustrated by Claude.

== Works ==
=== Writing ===
Claude Ponti creates stories which are articulated like dreams, often with a touch of humour.

He frequently invents new words, inspired by kids (bad pronunciation, or their imaginations). He also plays with the language, by use of subtle and poetic puns. Hence, the content is both for kids and adults, especially in his last few works.

Puns contribute to the writing dynamic, and characters are created through associating ideas. The whole book, story and images, is a base to imagine and create new psychological interpretations. Besides, a lot of books tells the adventure of characters who live initiatory journeys.

Ponti says the following on his own books :

“ My stories are like tales, always in the fantasy, they talk about the ' inside life ' and childhood feelings, so each child can put what he wants into the images : dreams and characters of his own. ”

=== Illustration ===
In Ponti's albums, text is tied to images. The gorgeous illustrations are full-blown elements, symbolic and independent. The attentive reader can discover details, easter eggs, hidden messages, or facts not mentioned in the text.

As for technique, tools and materials, Ponti switches between a mixture of watercolor, gouache and China ink, occasionally using photocopying, collages or a light table, for scenery and elements frequently reused throughout a book, or for changing the size of an element.

=== Inspirations ===
Claude Ponti is notably inspired by Lewis Carroll's wacky universe, and introduces references to Alice's Adventures in Wonderland and Through the Looking-Glass in his own books.

Furthermore, children's imagination inspired him, their ideas, their wishes, to create appreciated books :

“ When my daughter had a dream or a nightmare, the next day, I asked her to tell me about it, I was taking notes then I went to my office, and I worked. ”

== Legacy ==
According to Anne Dupin, co-editor-in-chief of the CRDP's Argos magazine, speaking for the CRDP of Créteil in 2007:

Claude Ponti is to my mind a vital author in the whole children’s production, including the abundant creativity and the fanciful graphic nearly brings kids infatuation. His universe, with these multiple artistic and cultural references, themes and a languages proper to the childhood, his originality through forms, colors, typography, or pagination, brings narrative content that suits to the children’s emotional, and their expectations. They can find a new knowledge or word, which let them choose easily their destinies.

Catherine Renaud from Uppsala University, published a thesis on Claude Ponti's work in 2008, titled Les ‘ incroyabilicieux ’ mondes de Ponti – Une étude du double lectorat dans l’œuvre de Claude Ponti (English translation: The 'incrediblicious' worlds of Ponti: A study of dual-readership in Claude Ponti's work). The study focuses on reading and analysing Ponti's books as an adult, from the books aimed squarely at children to Ponti's more mature works, and the recurring themes across both.

Ponti was interviewed in 2019, for a documentary on himself, titled Claude Ponti, un art de l'enfance (English translation: an art of childhood), by Thierry Kubler and Stéphanie Molez.

In 2025, Claude Ponti received the SGDL's Grand Prix pour l'Œuvre, for the entirety of his works.

=== International ===
Nowadays, Claude Ponti's albums are translated into 13 languages, including English, Spanish, German, Greek and Swedish. Russian publishing houses are starting to pay attention to the author, while Chinese and Korean people are nearly fanatical concerning him. His 1992 book, L'Arbre Sans Fin, was published by Bir for South Korea in 2001, with Korean translation by Jung-im Yoon.

According to Isabelle Darthy, who was the author's publisher in 1990:

“The works of Claude Ponti present specific challenges for translation because of their linguistic density and a frequent use of wordplay. The albums aimed to the international public required multiple readings to identify the underlying semantic layers, because Claude Ponti's puns and expressions are complex, and often subtle. Translating those books required very experienced translators, and even fans of the author.”

Claude Ponti's books have also hit the USA market, via the not-for-profit publisher Archipelago Books (under their foreign children's titles imprint, Elsewhere Editions), starting with My Valley in 2017, translated by Alyson Waters.

=== Awards ===
- 1988: (France) Prix Sorcières Toddlers category, for Adèle s’en mêle
- 1992: (France) Prix Sorcières First Readings category, for Broutille
- 1994: (France) Chrétien de Troyes Award for Okilélé
- 1997: (France) Prix Sorcières Toddlers category, for Sur la branche
- 2000: IBBY “Honour List”, Illustration category, for Ma vallée
- 2000: (France) SGDL Grand Prize winners of children's books for Sur l'île des Zertes
- 2006: (France) A Prix Sorcières award for all his works.
- 2008: (Norway) Selection for the Hans Christian Andersen Award, Illustration category
- 2022: (Sweden) Selection for the Astrid Lindgren Memorial Award
- 2023: (Sweden) Selection for the Astrid Lindgren Memorial Award
- 2025: (France) SGDL's Grand Prix pour l'Œuvre, for all his works.

== Bibliography ==
Year	Title	Publisher	Notes
1986	L'Album d'Adèle	Gallimard jeunesse	English translation: Adele's Album
1987	Adèle s’en mêle	Gallimard	
1989	Ma Vallée	Gallimard	
1987	La Colère de Monsieur Dubois	Gallimard	
1988	Adèle et la pelle	Gallimard	
1989	La Lune, la Grenouille et le Noir	Gallimard	Illustrations by Claude Ponti, text by Monique Ponticelli
1990	Pétronille et ses 120 petits	l'École des Loisirs	
1991	Blaise et la tempêteuse bouchée	l'École des Loisirs	
1991	Le jour du mange-poussin	l'École des Loisirs	
1992	Blaise dompteur de taches	l'École des Loisirs	
1992	L'arbre sans fin	l'École des Loisirs	
1993	Okilélé	l'École des Loisirs	
1993	La Tempête	l'École des Loisirs	Illustrations by Claude Ponti, text by Florence Seyvos
1993	Tromboline et Foulbazar : La Fenêtre	l'École des Loisirs	
1993	Tromboline et Foulbazar : Les Épinards	l'École des Loisirs	
1993	Tromboline et Foulbazar : La Voiture	l'École des Loisirs	
1994	Blaise et le robinet	l'École des Loisirs	
1994	Parci et Parla	l'École des Loisirs	
1994	Dans la pomme	l'École des Loisirs	
1994	Dans le gant	l'École des Loisirs	
1994	Dans le loup	l'École des Loisirs	
1994	Derrière la poussette	l'École des Loisirs	
1994	Pochée	l'École des Loisirs	Illustrations by Claude Ponti, text by Florence Seyvos. Awarded the Bernard Versele prize in Belgium.
1994	Sur le lit	l'École des Loisirs	
1995	L'Écoute-aux-portes	l'École des Loisirs	
1995	Le Bébé bonbon	l'École des Loisirs	
1995	Tromboline et Foulbazar : Les Masques	l'École des Loisirs	
1995	Tromboline et Foulbazar : La boîte	l'École des Loisirs	
1995	Le Chien invisible	l'École des Loisirs	Won the 1995 Totem prize, from Telerama and Salon du Livre de Jeunesse.
1996	Sur la branche	l'École des Loisirs	
1996	Dans la voiture	l'École des Loisirs	
1996	Au fond du jardin	l'École des Loisirs	
1996	Le Tournemire	l'École des Loisirs	
1997	Zénobie	l'École des Loisirs	
1997	Le Nakakoué	l'École des Loisirs	
1998	Tromboline et Foulbazar : Le Nuage	l'École des Loisirs	
1998	Tromboline et Foulbazar : Le A	l'École des Loisirs	
1998	Tromboline et Foulbazar : Le Cauchemar	l'École des Loisirs	
1999	Monsieur Monsieur et Mademoiselle Moiselle : Bizarre... Bizarre	l'École des Loisirs	
1999	Monsieur Monsieur et Mademoiselle Moiselle : Les Chaussures neuves	l'École des Loisirs	
1999	Monsieur Monsieur et Mademoiselle Moiselle : Le Chapeau à secrets	l'École des Loisirs	
1999	Monsieur Monsieur et Mademoiselle Moiselle : Une semaine de Monsieur Monsieur	l'École des Loisirs	
1999	Sur l'île des Zertes	l'École des Loisirs	Awarded the SGDL 2000's Youth Book Grand Prize.
2000	Le Doudou méchant	l'École des Loisirs	
2001	Tromboline et Foulbazar : Le petit Frère	l'École des Loisirs	
2001	Le Chien et le Chat	l'École des Loisirs	
2001	Tromboline et Foulbazar : Le Non	l'École des Loisirs	
2001	Georges Lebanc	l'École des Loisirs	
2002	Petit Prince Pouf	l'École des Loisirs	Illustrations by Claude Ponti, text by Agnès Desarthe
2002	Schmélele et l'Eugénie des larmes	l'École des Loisirs	
2003	La Revanche de Lili Prune	l'École des Loisirs	
2004	Monsieur Monsieur et Mademoiselle Moiselle : Les Montres molles	l'École des Loisirs	
2004	Monsieur Monsieur et Mademoiselle Moiselle : Le Réfrigogérateur	l'École des Loisirs	
2004	Monsieur Monsieur et Mademoiselle Moiselle : Un thé d'été	l'École des Loisirs	
2004	Blaise et le château d'Anne Hiversère	l'École des Loisirs	Awarded the SNCF 2005 Youth Book Grand Prize.
2005	Mille secrets de poussins	l'École des Loisirs	
2006	La Nuit des Zèfirottes	l'École des Loisirs	
2007	Almanach Ouroulboulouck	l'École des Loisirs	
2008	Catalogue de parents pour les enfants qui veulent en changer	l'École des Loisirs	
2009	Bih-Bih et le Bouffron-Gouffron	l'École des Loisirs	
2009	Tromboline et Foulbazar : Dans rien	l'École des Loisirs	
2009	Tromboline et Foulbazar : L'avion	l'École des Loisirs	
2010	Sœurs et frères	l'École des Loisirs	
2011	Mô-Namour	l'École des Loisirs	
2012	La Venture d’Isée	l'École des Loisirs	
2014	L’Avie d’Isée	l'École des Loisirs	
2014	Blaise et le kontrôleur de Kastatroffe	l'École des Loisirs	
2015	L'Affreux moche Salétouflaire et les Ouloums-Pims	l'École des Loisirs	
2016	Le Mystère des Nigmes	l'École des Loisirs	
2017	La course en livre	l'École des Loisirs	
2018	Le fleuve	l'École des Loisirs	
2018	Enfances	l'École des Loisirs	English translation: Childhoods. Illustrations by Claude Ponti. Written by Marie Desplechin. Biographies of various important real, fictional and legendary children, throughout history and culture.
2019	Mouha	l'École des Loisirs	
2020	Voyage au pays des monstres	l'École des Loisirs	
2021	Blaise, Isée et le Tue-planète	l'École des Loisirs	
2023	Le Chemin	l'École des Loisirs	
2023	Les mêmes, on rit !	l'École des Loisirs	A memory card-matching game, starring Ponti's chicklets.
2024	À l'aise, Blaise !	l'École des Loisirs	
2025	Olie-Boulie : Ma doudoue	l'École des Loisirs	
2025	Olie-Boulie : Les papillonnes	l'École des Loisirs	
2025	Olie-Boulie : La promenade	l'École des Loisirs	
2025	Est-ce qu'on voit mieux les rêves si on dort avec ses lunettes ?	l'École des Loisirs	English translation: Do we see dreams better if we sleep with our glasses? A compilation of humorous philosophical Q&A's for small children.

=== Novels for adults ===
- Les Pieds-Bleus (1995); Published by Éditions de l'olivier
- Est-ce qu'hier n'est pas fini ? (1999); Published by Éditions de l'Olivier
- Le monde, et inversement (2006); Published by Éditions de l'Olivier
- Questions d'importance (2011); Published by publie.net

=== Novels for children ===
- Broutille (1991); Published by L'École des loisirs (Mouche collection)
- Pochée (1994); Illustrations by Claude Ponti, written by Florence Seyvos, Published by L'École des loisirs (Mouche collection)
- Zénobie (1997); Published by L'École des loisirs (Neuf collection).

=== Theater plays ===
- La Trijolie 1 - La Pantoufle (2006); Published by L'École des loisirs
- La Trijolie 2 - Bonjour - Où sont les mamans ? (2006); Published by L'École des loisirs
- La Table (2011); Published by publie.net.
- La Tente (2012); Published by L'École des loisirs.
- Pluie Visage Soleil (2016); Published by L'École des loisirs.
