= Prix Sorcières =

French literary award

The Prix Sorcières (French pronunciation: [pʁi sɔʁsjɛʁ]) is an annual literary prize awarded in France since 1986 to works of children's literature in a number of categories. The categories were renamed in 2018.

The prizewinners are decided jointly by the ALSJ (Association des Librairies Spécialisées Jeunesse) and the ABF (Association des Bibliothécaires de France).

Qualifying works must be written in French or translated into French from the original language. Authors from outside France who have won the prize include Anthony Browne, Anne Fine, Michael Morpurgo and J. K. Rowling.

== The Prix Sorcières 2020 ==
=== Carrément Beau Mini category. ===
- Emmanuel Lecaye et Marc Majewski, Les mots peints. Ed. L'école des loisirs
- Gaëtan Doremus, Quatre Pattes. Ed. Rouergue
- Jérôme Ruillier, Où va Mona? Ed. L'Agrume
- Raphaële Enjary et Olivier Philipponneau, Alis. Ed. Albin Michel

=== Carrément Beau Maxi category ===
- Winner: Loren Capelli, Cap! Ed. Courtes et Longues
- Matthias Picard, Jim Curious : voyage a travers la jungle. Ed. 2024
- Victoire de Changy et Marine Schneider, L'ours Kintsugi. Ed. Cambourakis
- Emma Adbage, Le repaire. Ed. Cambourakis
- Irène Bonacina, Nos chemins. Ed. Albin Michel

=== Carrément Passionnant Mini category ===
- Winner: Agnès Debacker et Anaïs Brunet, L'arrêt du coeur ou comment Simon découvrit l'amour dans une cuisine. Ed. MéMo
- Susin Nielsen, Partis sans laisser d'adresse. Ed. Hélium
- Caroline Solé et Gaya Wisniewski, Akita et les grizzlys. Ed. L'école des loisirs
- Nicolas Deleau et Irène Bonacina, Maskime et les petites choses. Ed. des éléphants
- Marjolaine Nadal et Marianne Pasquet, Du vent dans la tête. Ed. Voce Verso

=== Carrément Passionnant Maxi category ===
- Winner: Flore Vesco, L'estrange Malaventure de Mirella. Ed. L'école des loisirs
- Lauren Wolk, Longtemps j'ai rêvé de mon île. Ed. L'école des loisirs
- Marion Brunet, Sans foi ni loi. Ed. PKJ
- Gary D. Schmidt, Autour de Jupiter. Ed. Bayard
- Marie Pavlenko, Un si petit oiseau. Ed. Flammarion

=== Carrément Sorcière Fiction category ===
- Winner: William Grill, Le dernier roi des loups : l'histoire vraie de Lobo le loup et d'Ernest Seton le chasseur. Ed. Sarbacane
- Cornelius (Davide Cali) et Tommaso Carozzi, Le jour des baleines. Ed. Chocolat!
- Shaun Tan, Cigale. Ed. Gallimard
- Stéphane Kiehl, Vert : une histoire dans la jungle. Ed. De la Marinière
- Laura Bellini, Les puces et le renard. Ed. Atelier du Poisson Soluble

=== Carrément Sorcière Non-Fiction category ===
- Winner: Philippe Nessmann et Régis Lejonc, Dans tous les sens. Ed. Seuil
- Morgane Soularue et Camille de Cussac, Cheveux et autres poils. Ed. Gallimard
- Monika Vaicenaviciene, Qu'est-ce qu'un fleuve? Ed. Cambourakis
- JR, Les rides. Ed. Phaidon
- Delphine Perret, Kaleidescopage. Ed. Rouergue

== The Prix Sorcières 2019 ==
=== Carrément Beau Mini category ===
- Winner: Delphine Perret, Une super histoire de cow-boy. Ed. Fourmis rouges
- Elis Wilk, L'appel de la lune. Ed. Versant Sud
- Laetitia Bourget et Alice Gravier, Ma maison. Ed. Grandes personnes
- Emilie Vast, Moi, j'ai peur du loup. Ed. MeMo
- Kitty Crowther, Petites histoires de nuits. Ed. EDL

=== Carrément Beau Maxi category ===
- Winner: Pierre-Jacques Ober, Jules Ober et Felicity Coonan, Petit soldat. Ed. Seuil
- Marion Duval, Toi-même. Ed. Albin Michel
- Carmen Chica et Manuel Marsol, La montagne. Ed. Fourmis rouges
- Marie Dorléans, Nous avons rendez-vous. Ed. Seuil
- Rebecca Dautremer, Les riches heures de Jacominus Gainsborough. Ed. Sarbacane

=== Carrément Passionnant Mini category ===
- Winner: Kieran Larwood, La légende de Podkin le brave, Tome 1. Ed. Gallimard
- Adrien Albert, Claude et Morino. Ed. EDL
- Alexandre Chardin, Mentir aux étoiles. Ed. Casterman
- Audren, La petite épopée des pions. Ed. MeMo
- Céline Claire et Clémence Pollet, Un chien comme ça. Ed. Voce verso

=== Carrément Passionnant Maxi category ===
- Winner: Nastasia Rugani, Milly Vodovic. Ed. MeMo
- Lauren Wolk, La combe aux loups. Ed. EDL
- Davide Morosinotto, Le célèbre catalogue Walker & Dawn. Ed. EDL
- Marie-Sophie Vermot, Soixante-douze heures. Ed. Thierry Magnier
- Severine Vidal, Pëppo. Ed. Bayard

=== Carrément Sorcière Fiction category ===
- Winner: Manuel Marsol, Duel au soleil. Ed. Agrume
- Tom Haugomat, À travers. Ed. Thierry Magnier
- Riccardo Bozzi, Violeta Lopiz et Valerio Vidali, La forêt. Ed. Gallimard
- Raphaële Frier et Julien Martinière, Le tracas de Blaise. Ed. Atelier du Poisson soluble
- Joanna Concejo et Olga Tokarczuk, Une âme égarée. Ed. Format

=== Carrément Sorcière Non-Fiction category ===
- Winner: Fanny Pageaud, Musée des museaux amusants. Ed. Poisson soluble
- Sylvain Azial et Hélène Rajcak, Panthera tigris. Ed. Rouergue
- Claire Cantais, Big Bang Pop! Ed. Poisson soluble
- Alexandra Litvina et Ania Desnitskaïa, L’appartement : un siècle d’histoire russe. Ed. Globe
- Alexandre Galand et Delphine Jacquot, Monstres & Merveilles. Ed. Seuil

== The Prix Sorcières 2018 ==
=== Carrément Beau Mini category ===
- Winner: Giovanna Zoboli, illus. Mariachiara Di Giorgio, Profession Crocodile. Ed. Les Fourmis rouges
- Gaëtan Dorémus, Minute papillon! Ed. Rouergue
- Margaux Othats, Blanc. Ed. Magnani
- Coralie Bickford-Smith et Marie Ollier, Le renard et l’étoile. Ed. Gallimard
- Isabelle Simler, Doux rêveurs. Ed. Courtes et longues

=== Carrément Beau Maxi category ===
- Winner: Chiara Mezzalama, illus. Régis Lejonc, Le jardin du dedans dehors. Ed. Les éditions des éléphants
- Gilles Baum, illus. Thierry Dedieu, D’entre les ogres. Ed. Seuil
- Anne-Margot Ramstein et Matthias Arégui, Dedans-Dehors. Ed. Albin Michel
- Michaël Escoffier, illus. Kris Di Giacomo, La leçon. Ed. Frimousse
- Pierre Zenzius, L’ascension de Saussure. Ed. Rouergue

=== Carrément Passionnant Mini category ===
- Winner: Sara Pennypacker, illus. Jon Klassen, Pax et le petit soldat. Ed. Gallimard
- Peter Brown, Robot sauvage. Ed. Gallimard Jeunesse
- Jonathan Garnier, illus. Rony Hotin, Momo T.1. Ed. Casterman
- Michelle Montmoulinex, Baleine rouge. Ed. Hélium
- Mauri Christophe, illus. Marie Caudry, Le Petit Poucet, c’est moi! Ed. Casterman

=== Carrément Passionnant Maxi category ===
- Winner: Stéphane Servant, Sirius. Ed. Rouergue
- Danielle Younge-Ullman, Toute la beauté du monde n’a pas disparu. Ed. Gallimard
- Gary-D Schmidt, Jusqu’ici tout va bien. Ed. École des Loisirs
- Eric Pessan, Dans la forêt de Hokkaido. Ed. École des Loisirs
- Anne-Laure Bondoux, illus. Coline Peyrony, L’aube sera grandiose. Ed. Gallimard

=== Carrément Sorcière Fiction category ===
- Winner: Henri Meunier et Régis Lejonc, Cœur de bois. Ed. Notari
- Christian Lagrange, De la terre à la pluie. Ed. Seuil
- Nina Wehrle et Evelyne Laube, Marta & moi. It’s raining elephants. Ed. Notari
- Jeanne Macaigne, L’Hiver d’Isabelle. Ed. MeMo
- Thomas Vinau, illus. Bertrand Salé, L’aube appartient aux pies. Ed. Motus

=== Carrément Sorcière Non-Fiction category ===
- Winner: Cruschiform, Colorama. Ed. Gallimard
- Liuna Virardi, Comment tout a commencé. Ed. MeMo
- Marie Desplechin, illus. Betty Bone, Ta race, moi et les autres. Ed. Courtes et longues
- Pablo Salvaje, Âme animale. Ed. Nathan
- Marie-Eve de grave, illus. Jean-Jacques de Grave, L’histoire de Ned Kelly. Ed. Hélium

== Winners of the Toddlers (Tout-Petits) category, 1987–2017 ==
- 1987 : Christian Bruel, illustrated by Anne Bozellec, Liberté Nounours, Le sourire qui mord, "Plaisirs" coll.
- 1988 : Claude Ponti, Adèle s'en mêle, Gallimard Jeunesse
- 1989 : Marie-Claire Bruley, Lya Tourn, illustrated by Philippe Dumas, Enfantines, L'École des loisirs
- 1990 : Jan Ormerod, Une casserole pour jouer, Milan
- 1991 : Michèle Nikly and Jean Claverie, L’art du pot, Albin Michel Jeunesse
- 1992 : Grégoire Solotareff, Les bêtises de Bébé Ours, Hatier
- 1993 : Julie, Pas vu, pas pris, Mango
- 1994 : Charlotte Mollet, Une souris verte, Didier Jeunesse
- 1995 : Sam Mac Bratney, illustrated by Anita Jeram, Guess How Much I Love You, L'École des loisirs
- 1996 : Trish Cooke and Helen Oxenbury, Très, très fort !, Flammarion
- 1997 : Claude Ponti, Sur la branche, L'École des loisirs
- 1998 : Jeanne Ashbé, Et dedans il y a..., L'École des loisirs, "Pastel" coll.
- 1999 : Christian Bruel, illustrated by Nicole Claveloux, Alboum, Éditions Être
- 2000 : Antonin Louchard and Katy Couprie, Tout un monde, Éditions Thierry Magnier
- 2001 : Voutch, Pourquôôââ, Éditions Thierry Magnier
- 2002 : Ruth Brown, Dix petites graines, Gallimard Jeunesse
- 2003 : Chantal Groléziat, Paul Mindy and Élodie Nouhen, Comptines et berceuses du baobab, Didier Jeunesse
- 2004 : Martine Perrin, Méli-Mélo, Milan
- 2005 : Jean Gourounas, Grosse légume, Éditions du Rouergue
- 2006 : Martine Perrin, Qui où quoi, Milan
- 2007 : Audrey Poussier, Mon Pull, L'École des loisirs
- 2008 : Claire Dé, Ouvre les yeux, Éditions du Panama
- 2009 : Anne Crausaz, Raymond rêve, Éditions MeMo
- 2010 : Cécile Boyer, Ouaf miaou cui-cui, Albin Michel Jeunesse
- 2011 : Hervé Tullet, Un livre, Bayard jeunesse
- 2012 : Chris Haughton, Un peu perdu, éditions Thierry Magnier
- 2013 : Lucie Félix, Deux yeux, Éditions Les Grandes Personnes
- 2014 : Julie Safirstein, Le jour la nuit tout autour, Hélium
- 2015 : Édouard Manceau, Le petit curieux, Ed. Milan Jeunesse
- 2016 : Corinne Dreyfuss, Pomme, pomme, pomme, Éditions Thierry Magnier
- 2017 : 'Delphine Chedru, Paul a dit! Tourne la page et découvre la surprise, Hélium

== Winners of the Album (Albums) category, 1986–2017 ==
- 1986 : Toshi Yoshida, La querelle, L'École des loisirs
- 1987 : Michael Palin, Richard Seymour, illustrated by Alan Lee, La pierre de cristal, Casterman
- 1988 : Anne Quesemand, Laurent Berman, La mort marraine, Ipomoea
- 1989 : Claude Clément, Frédéric Clément, Le luthier de Venise, L'École des loisirs
- 1990 : Michael Rosen and Helen Oxenbury, La chasse à l’ours, Ouest-France
- 1991 : Philippe Corentin, L'Afrique de Zigomar, L'École des loisirs
- 1992 : Joan Manuel Gisbert, illustrated by Alfonso Ruano, Le gardien de l’oubli, Syros
- 1993 : François Place, Les derniers géants, Casterman
- 1994 : Werner Holzwarth and Wolf Erlbruch, De la petite taupe qui voulait savoir qui lui avait fait sur la tête, Milan
- 1995 : Thierry Dedieu, Yakouba, Seuil jeunesse
- 1996 : Philippe Corentin, L’ogre, le loup, la petite fille et le gâteau, L'École des loisirs
- 1997 : Fred Bernard and François Roca, La reine des fourmis a disparu, Albin Michel Jeunesse
- 1998 : Christian Voltz, Toujours rien, Éditions du Rouergue
- 1999 : Anthony Browne, Une histoire à quatre voix, Kaleidoscope
- 2000 : Michael Morpurgo, illustrated by Christian Birmingham, La sagesse de Wombat, Gautier-Languereau
- 2001 : Peter Sís, Madlenka, Grasset Jeunesse
- 2002 : David Wiesner, Les trois cochons, Circonflexe
- 2003 : Rascal and Stéphane Girel, Ami-Ami, L'École des loisirs, "Pastel" coll.
- 2004 : Rébecca Dautremer, L'amoureux, Gautier-Languereau
- 2005 : Wolf Erlbruch, La Grande question, Éditions Être
- 2006 : Magali Le Huche, Les Sirènes de Belpêchao, Didier jeunesse
- 2007 : Christian Voltz, La Caresse du papillon, Éditions du Rouergue
- 2008 : Jean-Luc Fromental, Joëlle Jolivet, 365 Pingouins, Éditions Naïve
- 2009 : Stian Hole, L'été de Garmann, Albin Michel Jeunesse
- 2010 : Isabelle Carrier, La petite casserole d'Anatole, Bilboquet
- 2011 : Germano Zullo and Albertine, Les oiseaux, La Joie de Lire
- 2012 : Anne Herbauts, De quelle couleur est le vent ?, éditions Casterman
- 2013 : Kenya Hirata, illustrated by Kunio Katô, La maison en petits cubes, éditions nobi nobi !
- 2014 : Roberto Innocenti and Aaron Frisch, La petite fille en rouge, Gallimard
- 2015 : Edward Van de Vendel, Le chien que Nino n'avait pas, Didier Jeunesse
- 2016 : Frédéric Marais, Yasuké, Éd. Les fourmis rouges
- 2017 : Nada Matta, Petite Pépite, Éditions MeMo

== Winners of the Early readers (Premières lectures) category, 1989–2017 ==
- 1989 : Marie-Aude Murail, Le chien des mers, L'École des loisirs
- 1990 : Marie-Aude Murail, illustrated by Michel Gay, Le hollandais sans peine, L'École des loisirs
- 1991 : Ann Cameron, illustrated by Thomas B. Allen, Le plus bel endroit du monde, L'École des loisirs
- 1992 : Claude Ponti, Broutille, L'École des loisirs
- 1993 : Christophe Donner, illustré par Philippe Dumas, Le cheval qui sourit, L'École des loisirs
- 1994 : Elzbieta, Flon-Flon et Musette, L'École des loisirs
- 1995 : Danielle Fossette, illustrated by Véronique Boiry, Je ne veux pas aller au tableau, Rouge et Or
- 1996 : Xavier-Laurent Petit, Colorbelle-ébène, L'École des loisirs
- 1997 : Didier Lévy and Coralie Gallibour, Peut-on faire confiance à un crocodile affamé ?, Albin Michel Jeunesse
- 1998 : Anne Fine, Journal d'un chat assassin, L'École des loisirs
- 1999 : Thierry Lenain, Mademoiselle Zazie a-t-elle un zizi ?, Nathan
- 2000 : Susie Morgenstern, illustrated by Mireille d’Allancé, Joker, L'École des loisirs
- 2001 : Rascal, illustrated by Stéphane Girel, Côté cœur, L'École des loisirs, "Pastel" coll.
- 2002 : Hubert Ben Kemoun, illustrated by François Roca, Terriblement vert !, Nathan
- 2003 : Jean-François Chabas, Le Père Tire-Bras, Éditions Thierry Magnier
- 2004 : Claude Helft, illustrated by Jiang Hong Chen, Hatchiko chien de Tokyo, Éditions Desclée de Brouwer
- 2005 : Hanno, Sur le bout des doigts, Éditions Thierry Magnier
- 2006 : Mathis, Cinq, six bonheurs, Éditions Thierry Magnier
- 2007 : Delphine Bournay, Grignotin et Mentalo, L'École des loisirs
- 2008 : Gustave Akakpo, Le Petit monde merveilleux, Grasset jeunesse
- 2009 : not awarded
- 2010 : Valérie Zenatti, illustrated by Audrey Poussier, Vérité, vérité chérie, L'École des loisirs
- 2011 : Mélanie Rutten, Oko, un thé en hiver, Éditions MeMo
- 2012 : Colas Gutman, L'enfant, L'École des loisirs
- 2013 : Vincent Cuvellier, illustrated by Ronan Badel, Émile est invisible, édition Gallimard Jeunesse, collection Giboulées
- 2014 : Agnès Domergue et Cécile Hudrisier, Il était une fois... Contes en haïkus, Thierry Magnier
- 2015 : Hélène Rice (text), Ronan Badel (illustrator), Le meilleur livre pour apprendre à dessiner une vache, Thierry Magnier
- 2016 : Jacques Goldstyn, L'arbragan, La pastèque
- 2017 : Delphine Perret, Björn: six histoires d'ours, Éd. Les fourmis rouges

== Winners of the Novels (Romans) category (until 1997) ==
- 1986 : Bethan Roberts, Manganinnie et l’enfant volé, Flammarion
- 1987 : Azouz Begag, Le gône du châaba, Éditions du Seuil
- 1988 : Natalie Babitt, Les yeux de l’amaryllis, Gallimard Jeunesse
- 1989 : Thierry Lenain, Un pacte avec le diable, Syros
- 1990 : Claude Gutman, La maison vide, Gallimard Jeunesse
- 1991 : Feng Jicai, Que cent fleurs s’épanouissent, Gallimard Jeunesse
- 1992 : Valérie Dayre, C’est la vie, Lili, Syros
- 1993 : Michael Morpurgo, illustrated by François Place, Le roi de la forêt des brumes, Gallimard Jeunesse
- 1994 : Thierry Lenain, La fille du canal, Syros
- 1995 : Michel Honaker, Le chevalier de Terre Noire, Book 1 : L’adieu au domaine and Book 2 : Le bras de la vengeance, Rageo
- 1996 : Marie Brantôme, Avec tout ce qu’on a fait pour toi, Seuil Jeunesse
- 1997 : Luis Sepulveda, illustrated by Miles Hyman, Histoire d’une mouette et du chat qui lui apprit à voler, Métailié et Éditions du Seuil

== Winners of the Junior novels (Romans juniors) category, 1998–2017 ==
- 1998 : Yaël Hassan, Un Grand-père tombé du ciel, Casterman
- 1999 : J. K. Rowling, Harry Potter à l'école des sorciers, Gallimard
- 2000 : Jean-Claude Mourlevat, L'Enfant Océan, Pocket Junior
- 2001 : Michael Morpurgo, illustrated by François Place, Le Royaume de Kensuké, Gallimard Jeunesse
- 2002 : Sylvie Weil, Le Mazal d'Elvina, L'École des loisirs, "Medium" coll.
- 2003 : Dominique Sampiero, illustrated by Monike Czarnecki, P’tite mère, Rue du monde, "Roman du Monde" coll.
- 2004 : Brigitte Smadja, Il faut sauver Saïd, L'École des loisirs
- 2005 : Anne Vantal, Chère Théo, Éditions Actes Sud Junior
- 2006 : Thomas Lavachery, Bjorn le Morphir, L'École des loisirs
- 2007 : Timothée de Fombelle, Tobie Lolness, Gallimard
- 2008 : Jerry Spinelli, Z comme Zinkoff, L'École des loisirs
- 2009 : Ulrich Hub, L'Arche part à 8 heures, Alice Jeunesse
- 2010 : Maria Parr, translated by Jean-Baptiste Coursaud, Cascades et gaufres à gogo, Éditions Thierry Magnier
- 2011 : Stéphanie Bonvicini and Marianne Ratier, La petite taiseuse, Éditions Naïve
- 2012 : Hermann Schulz, Mandela et Nelson, L'École des loisirs
- 2013 : Brian Selznick, Black out, Bayard jeunesse
- 2014 : Pam Muñoz Ryan, Le rêveur, illustrated by Peter Sis, Bayard jeunesse
- 2015 : Katherine Rundell, Le ciel nous appartient (Trad. Emmanuelle Ghez), Les grandes personnes
- 2016 : Michael Morpurgo, Le mystère de Lucy Lost, Gallimard jeunesse
- 2017 : Jakob Wegelius, Sally Jones, Éditions Thierry Magnier

== Winners of the Adolescent novels (Romans ados) category, 1998–2017 ==
- 1998 : Berthe Burko-Falcman, L’enfant caché, Le Seuil
- 1999 : Janine Teisson, Au cinéma Lux, Syros
- 2000 : Malika Ferdjoukh, Sombres citrouilles, L'École des loisirs, "Medium" coll.
- 2001 : Louis Sachar, Le Passage (translation of Holes), L'École des loisirs, "Medium" coll.
- 2002 : Anne-Lise Grobéty, Le temps des mots à voix basse, La Joie de lire
- 2003 : Celia Rees, Journal d'une sorcière, Le Seuil
- 2004 : Anne-Laure Bondoux, Les Larmes de l’assassin, Bayard, Millézime coll.
- 2005 : Michael Morpurgo, Soldat Peaceful, Éditions Gallimard Jeunesse
- 2006 : Marie-Sabine Roger, Le Quatrième soupirail, Éditions Thierry Magnier
- 2007 : Guillaume Guéraud, Je mourrai pas gibier, Éditions du Rouergue
- 2008 : Jean-Claude Mourlevat, Le Combat d'hiver, Gallimard Jeunesse
- 2009 : Xavier-Laurent Petit, Be safe, L'École des loisirs, "Medium" coll.
- and 2009 : Silvana de Mari, Le Dernier Orc, Albin Michel Jeunesse
- 2010 : Bernard Beckett, translated by Laetitia Devaux, Genesis, Gallimard Jeunesse
- 2011 : David Almond, illustrated by Dave McKean, Le Sauvage, Gallimard Jeunesse
- 2012 : Silvana Gandolfi, L'Innocent de Palerme, Éditions des grandes personnes
- 2013 : Sarah Cohen-Scali, Max, Gallimard Jeunesse, "Scripto" coll.
- 2014 : Jacqueline Kelly, Calpurnia, L'Ecole des loisirs, "Medium" coll.
- 2015 : Anne Fine, Le Passage du diable (The devil walks, trad. Dominique Kugler), L'école des loisirs
- 2016 : Clémentine Beauvais, Les petites reines, Sarbacane
- 2017 : Xavier-Laurent Petit, Le fils de l'Ursari, L'école des loisirs

== Winners of the Non-fiction (Documentaires) category, 1986–2017 ==
- 1986 : Joanna Cole, Kenneth Lily, Animaux de jour, grandeur nature and Animaux de nuit, grandeur nature, Casterman
- 1987 : Michel Pierre, with Antoine Sabbagh, illustrated by Morgan, L’Europe du Moyen Âge, Casterman
- 1988 : Thierry Benardeau and Marcel Pineau, Histoire de la musique, la musique dans l’histoire, Hatier
- 1989 : David Burnie, Le nid, l’œuf et l’oiseau, Gallimard Jeunesse
- 1990 : Sophie Curtil, Giacometti, Centre Pompidou
- 1991 : Musée en herbe, Sylvie Girardet, Claire Merleau-Ponty, Anne Tardy, illustrated by Fernando Puig Rosado, Les grands méchants loups, Bayard Jeunesse
- 1992 : Renée Kayser, Bernard Kayser, Copain des villes, Milan
- 1993 : Jean-Michel Rodrigo, illustrated by Hélène Perdereau, Pérou, destination bidonvilles, Albin-Michel jeunesse
- 1994 : Éric Chevallier, illustrated by Pef, Le préservatif, trois mille ans d'amour protégé, Casterman
- 1995 : Dominique Gaussen, Louis XIV et Versailles, Mango
- 1996 : Brigitte Govignon (under the dir.), La petite encyclopédie de l’art, Réunion des musées nationaux and Éditions du Regard
- 1997 : Stephen Johnson, Alphabetville, Circonflexe
- 1998 : Marie Lagier, Le livre du loup, Nathan
- 1999 : Pef, Zappe la guerre, Rue du monde
- 2000 : Chrystel Proupuech, Yapa le petit aborigène d’Australie, Mila Éditions
- 2001 : Marie Sellier, illustrated by Marion Lesage, L'Afrique, petit Chaka..., Réunion des musées nationaux
- 2002 : Elizabeth Combres, Florence Thinard, Emmanuel de la Grange, Mondes Rebelles : junior, Éditions Michalon
- 2003 : Claire D'Harcourt, Du coq à l’âne : Les animaux racontent l’art, Le Seuil - Man on Wire
- 2004 : Ursus Wehrli, L’art en bazar, Milan
- 2005 : Véronique Antoine-Andersen, L’art pour comprendre le monde, Actes Sud Junior
- 2006 : Catherine Louis, calligraphy by Shi Bo, Mon imagier chinois, Éditions Philippe Picquier
- 2007 : Carole Saturno, Enfants d'ici, parents d'ailleurs : histoire et mémoire de l'exode rural et de l'immigration, Gallimard
- 2008 : Claire Didier and Roland Guarrigue, Le livre des trous, Nathan
- 2009 : Caroline Laffon, Costumes, Éditions du Panama
- 2010 : Marie-Sabine Roger, illustrated by Anne Sol, À quoi tu joues ?, Éditions Sarbacane
- 2011 : Isabelle Bournier, illustrated by Jacques Ferrandez, Des hommes dans la guerre d'Algérie, Casterman
- 2012 : Julie Lannes, Chimères génétiques, L'atelier du poisson soluble
- 2013 : Aleksandra Mizielinska and Daniel Mizielinski, Cartes : voyages parmi mille curiosités et merveilles du monde, Rue du monde
- 2014 : Thierry Lenain and Benoît Morel, C'est ta vie ! L'encyclopédie qui parle d'amitié, d'amour et de sexe aux enfants, Oskar
- 2015 : Yvan Pommaux (text and illustration) and Christophe Ylla-Somers, Nous, notre histoire, L'école des loisirs
- 2016 : Pascale Hédelin, Cité Babel, Éd. des éléphants
- 2017 : Julie Guillem, Atlas des nuages, Ed. Actes Sud Junior

== Winners of the Special prize, 1989–2014 ==
- 1989 : Prix spécial Révolution for Hervé Luxardo and Gérard Finel, Douze idées qui changèrent le monde : la Révolution française, Hachette Jeunesse
- 1991 : Grand prix spécial for ten years of the Pef association
- 1993 : Daniel Pennac, Comme un roman, Gallimard
- 1997 : Claude Boujon, La chaise bleue, L'École des loisirs
- 2001 : François Place, Du pays des amazones aux îles Indigo, Du pays de Jade à l’île Quinookta, De la rivière rouge au pays des Zizotls, Casterman and Gallimard
- 2002 : Robert Cormier
- 2006 : Claude Ponti
- 2007 : Pef
- 2010 : Thierry Dedieu
- 2012 : Elzbieta
- 2014 : Tomi Ungerer

== See also ==
- List of literary awards
