= Jeram (disambiguation) =

Jeram is a mukim in Kuala Selangor District, Selangor, Malaysia.

Jeram may also refer to:

- Jeram, California, former settlement in Mendocino County
- Jeram (state constituency), in Selangor, Malaysia
- Anita Jeram (born 1965), English author and illustrator of picture books
- Praven Jeram (fl. 1971–1977), New Zealand football goalkeeper
