= Michèle Petit =

French anthropologist (born 1946)

Michèle Petit (born in 1946, in Paris) is a French anthropologist, specialising in literacy. A member of the French National Centre for Scientific Research, she was the recipient of the Astrid Lindgren Memorial Award in 2023.
