= Véronique =

Véronique can refer to:

- Véronique (given name), a French female name
- Véronique River, a river in the Côte-Nord region of the province of Quebec, Canada.
- Véronique (rocket), a French sounding rocket
- Véronique (operetta), composed by André Messager in 1898
- Véronique (film), a 1950 French historical musical comedy film
- Véronique, the stage name of French Canadian singer Véronique Béliveau
- the principal character in The Double Life of Veronique, a 1991 film by Krzysztof Kieślowski
- Véronique, a song from the musical On the 20th Century, 1978
- Véronique, a song by Pink Martini from their 2004 album Hang On Little Tomato
- RTL Véronique, a Dutch television channel, later renamed RTL 4
