= Banco del Libro =

Venezuelan non-profit organization

Coordinates: 10.4907°N 66.8497°W

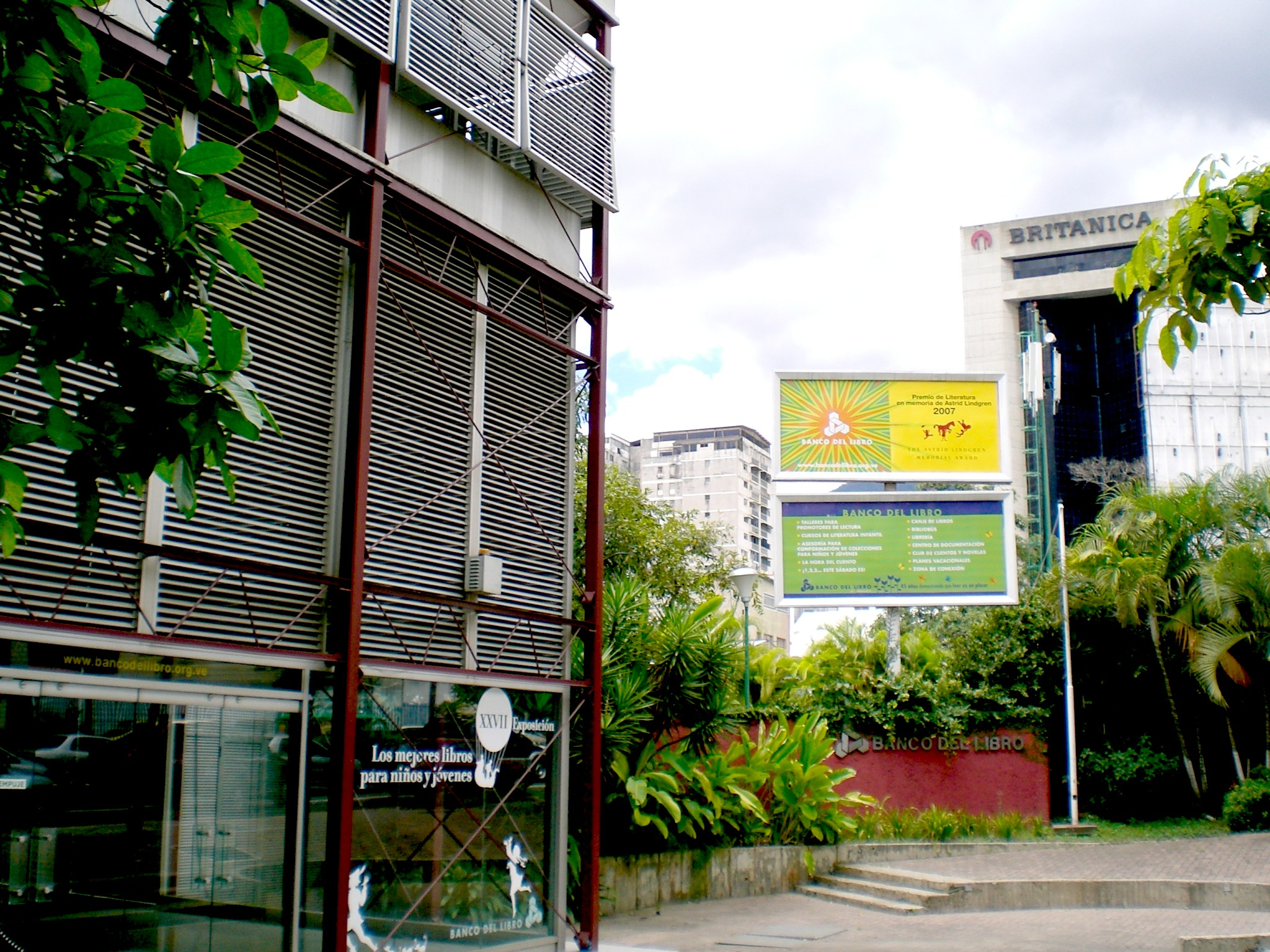
Banco del Libro in Caracas, Venezuela

Banco del Libro is a non-profit organization for the promotion of children's literature, with headquarters in Caracas, Venezuela. It was established in 1960 as a centre for the exchange of textbooks – hence the name Banco del Libro (Book Bank). As it has grown it has diversified to promote reading in Venezuela, in every conceivable arena and genre of children’s literature.

In 2007 Banco del Libro won the biggest prize in children's literature, the Astrid Lindgren Memorial Award from the Swedish Arts Council, recognising its "long-term sustainable work" as a promoter of reading. It is one of two institutions to win the award (2003 to 2012).

Since 1980, the organization has annually nominated and awarded the best children's and young adult literature books published in Spanish. These awards, which have become a benchmark of literary quality, are among the most prestigious awards in the Spanish-language literary world.

== Awards ==
- Reading Promotion Award, IBBY, 1988
- Guust van Wesemael Prize, IFLA, 2003
- Astrid Lindgren Memorial Award, 2007
