= Sam McBratney =

Northern Irish writer (1943–2020)

- Born: 1 March 1943; Belfast, Northern Ireland
- Died: 18 September 2020 (aged 77); County Antrim, Northern Ireland
- Occupation: Author
- Spouse: Maralyn McBratney (married 1964-his death)

Samuel McBratney (1 March 1943 – 18 September 2020) was a writer from Northern Ireland. He wrote more than fifty books for children and young adults, and is best known as the author of the best-selling children's book Guess How Much I Love You, which has sold more than 30 million copies worldwide, and been translated into 53 languages.

== Biography ==
=== Personal life ===
McBratney was born in Belfast, Northern Ireland on 1 March 1943. He was educated at Friends School, Lisburn. After earning a degree in history from Trinity College Dublin, he worked as a primary and secondary school teacher from 1970 until 1990, when he took early retirement to focus on writing. McBratney and his wife Maralyn, a teacher, had three children, who are now adults, who then went on to have children in their own right, including Jack McBratney.

=== Publishing career ===
McBratney wrote his first novel, Mark Time, in 1969. Initially, he was unable to find a publisher for the book, which he has described as semi-autobiographical, and as a "pre-puberty love story." The book was ultimately published by Abelard-Schuman in 1976. Writing part-time while also pursuing his career as a teacher, McBratney had published twenty-three novels by the time he retired from teaching in 1990, most of them targeted at young adult readers. One of his most successful works in this genre was The Chieftain's Daughter (1993), a historical novel set in the 5th century, which won a Bisto Book of the Year Merit Award in 1994. Other notable works include The Lough Neagh Monster, (1994) and Put a Saddle on a Pig (1991), which was republished as You Just Don't Listen in 1993.

After his editor suggested he write a picture book for younger readers, McBratney began working with illustrator Anita Jeram on Guess How Much I Love You, which was first published by Walker Books in 1994. The book became popular quickly, selling more than 150 thousand copies within four months of its publication. By September 1995, it had sold more than a million copies worldwide. Popular as a gift for new parents, weddings, and other special occasions, the book has become a modern classic and sales have continued to climb. It is frequently listed among the most popular and best selling children's books of all time. A sequel to Guess How Much I Love You titled Will You be my Friend was posthumously published in late September 2020.

=== Reception ===
McBratney has been called "a highly skilled but somewhat uneven" author, and he himself commented that many of his earlier works sold "just a few hundred copies," and were remaindered. He won considerable praise from critics for The Chieftain's Daughter, however, and widespread admiration for Guess How Much I Love You. Booklist reviewer Stephanie Zvirin, for example, suggested that there was "not a note wrong" in the book, and predicted that it would become "an enduring bedtime favorite – right up there with Goodnight Moon" shortly after its publication.

=== Death ===
McBratney died on 18 September 2020, at the age of 77.

== Select bibliography ==
- Mark Time. London: Abelard-Schuman, 1976.
- Jimmy Zest. Illustrated by Thelma Lambert. London: Hamish Hamilton, 1982.
- Zesty. Illustrated by Susan Hallard. London: Hamish Hamilton, 1984.
- Put a Saddle on the Pig. London: Methuen, 1992.
- The Chieftain's Daughter. Dublin: O'Brien Press, 1993.
- Guess How Much I Love You. Illustrated by Anita Jeram. London: Walker Books, 1994.
- The Dark at the Top of the Stairs. Illustrated by Ivan Bates. Cambridge, MA: Candlewick Press, 1996.
- Just You and Me. Illustrated by Ivan Bates. Cambridge, MA: Candlewick Press, 1998.
- I'm Not Your Friend. Illustrated by Kim Lewis. London: Collins, 2001.
- You're All My Favorites. Illustrated by Antia Jeram. Cambridge, MA: Candlewick Press, 2004.
- I Love it When You Smile. Illustrated by Charles Fudge. New York : HarperCollins, 2005.
- I'm Sorry. Illustrated by Jennifer Eachus. New York : HarperCollins, 2006.
- When I'm Big. Illustrated by Anita Jeram. Cambridge, MA: Candlewick Press, 2007.
- Colors Everywhere. Illustrated by Anita Jeram. Cambridge, MA: Candlewick Press, 2008.
- Let's Play In the Snow. Illustrated by Anita Jeram. Cambridge, MA: Candlewick Press, 2008.
- The Adventures of Little Nutbrown Hare. Somerville, MA: Candlewick Press, 2012.
- There, There. Illustrated by Ivan Bates. Somerville, MA: Candlewick Press, 2013.

== Awards ==
- Bisto Book of the Year Award for Teenage Fiction (1993), awarded for Put a Saddle on the Pig.
- Bisto Book of the Year Merit Award (1994), awarded for The Chieftain's Daughter.
- Griffel Award Children's Books Association of the Netherlands (1995)
- American Library Association Notable Children's Books (1996), for Guess How Much I Love You.
