= Celia Rees =

English author

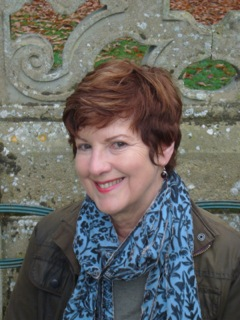
- Born: 17 June 1949 (age 77); Solihull, West Midlands, England, United Kingdom
- Education: University of Warwick University of Birmingham
- Occupation: Author
- Writing career
- Period: 1993 – present
- Genres: Young adult fiction, children's literature, horror, fantasy
- Website: www.celiarees.com

Celia Rees (born 17 June 1949) is an English author.

Celia Rees was born in Solihull, West Midlands and attended Tudor Grange Grammar School for Girls. She studied History and Politics at Warwick University and has a PGCE and a master's degree in Education from Birmingham University.

She became a teacher after leaving university and taught English in comprehensive schools in Coventry for sixteen years and this is when she began to write. Her intention was to ‘write for teenagers, books that they would want to read, almost adult in style and content.’ She left teaching in 1989. After working part-time in Further Education and as an Open Studies Lecturer for Warwick University, she became a full-time writer in 1997.

Celia is a regular tutor for the Arvon Foundation, is a member of the Society of Authors, and has been Chair of the Children's Writers and Illustrators Group. She is a member of the Scattered Authors Society and a Fellow of the English Association.

Celia lives with her husband, Terence Rees in Leamington Spa. She has one daughter, Catrin, who is a lawyer in London.

== Writing ==
Celia Rees writes mainly for young adults and has written across a range of genre from thrillers, including her first novel, Every Step You Take (1993) to This Is Not Forgiveness (2012) to gothic and speculative fiction, beginning with the vampire novel, Blood Sinister (1996)) and ending (for the time being) with The Stone Testament (2007).

She is perhaps best known for her historical fiction. Witch Child (2000) was shortlisted for the Guardian Children's Fiction Prize (2001) and won the Prix Sorcières in France (2003). The sequel, Sorceress (2002), was shortlisted for the Whitbread (Costa) Children's Book Award; and Pirates! (2003) was shortlisted for the W.H. Smith Children's Book Award. Sovay followed in 2008 and The Fool’s Girl in 2010

Celia Rees's novels have been translated into 28 languages. Her books for younger readers include The Bailey Game (1994) and the Trap in Time Trilogy (2001/2).

== List of works ==
- Every Step You Take (1993)
- The Bailey Game (1994)
- Colour her Dead (1994)
- Blood Sinister (1996) *Anthologized with other Point Horror in Decayed (2001)
- Midnight Hour (1997)
- Ghost Chamber (1997)
- The Vanished (1997)
- H Is for Haunting (1998) (Note: Out of print)
- A Is for Apparition (1998)
- U Is for Unbeliever (1998)
- N Is for Nightmare (1998)
- T Is for Terror (1998)
- S Is for Shudder (1998)
- Soul Taker (1998)
- Truth or Dare (2000)
- The Cunning Man (2000)
- Witch Child (2000)
- Trap in Time Trilogy: Trap in Time (2001), City of Shadows (2002), and The Host Rides Out (2002)
- Sorceress (2002)
- Pirates! (2003)
- Wish House (2005)
- Stone Testament (2007)
- Sovay (2008)
- The Fool’s Girl (2011)
- This Is Not Forgiveness (2012)
- Daughters of Time (2014)
- Glass Town Wars (2019)
