= Witch Child =

2000 novel by Celia Rees

- First edition
- Author: Celia Rees
- Cover artist: Wolfgang Mustain (photography)
- Language: English
- Publisher: Bloomsbury Publishing (UK)
- Publication date: 2000
- Publication place: United Kingdom
- Pages: 234
- ISBN: 978-0-747-54639-9

Witch Child is a historical novel by English author Celia Rees and published in 2000 by Bloomsbury Publishing. It was shortlisted for the Guardian Children's Fiction Prize (2001), won two French prizes, the Prix Sorcières (2003). and the Prix Roman Millepages (2002) and in Italy it was runner up for the Cento Literary Prize.

== Inspiration ==
Celia Rees was inspired by visiting the American Museum near Bath, recalling her studies of American History at University. She recounts that "I remember being struck by the isolation of the first settlers who founded New England and thinking about how they must have felt, surrounded by vast forests, on the edge of an unexplored continent, an ocean away from home. Many years later I was reading a book about 17th century witch persecutions. One of the accounts was of the Salem witch trials, and those fearful isolated communities came back to me. In the same book I found a description of the activities of one Matthew Hopkins, Witch Finder, at work in the English Civil War period. At about this time, I also read a book about shamanism, and it suddenly occurred to me that the beliefs and skills which would have condemned a woman to death in one society would have been revered in another. In North America, at that time, two communities with these sharply differing values could have been living side by side – Native Americans were, broadly speaking, a shamanistic people. That got me thinking, what if there was a girl who could move between these two worlds? … Mary came into my head and Witch Child began ..."

Rees loosely based Mary's mother on Lucy Hutchinson, the wife of Colonel John Hutchinson who was a Parliamentarian and commander of the New Model Army during the English Civil War.

== Plot ==
Beginning: Fourteen-year-old Mary's grandmother was suspected to be a witch, she was 'walked' until she could no longer hobble, pricked and then tested if she could float. Then she was hanged as a witch. Mary was plucked from the crowd and taken down a steep alley to a carriage, where a lady sat inside waiting for her.
Journey 1: They travelled to an inn where Mary had a bath and was given new clothes. The lady told her that she was going to America with Puritans, sailing from Southampton shortly. The lady had to stand by her husband as he had put his name to King Charles' death warrant. Mary then recognised the lady as her mother.
Journey 2: the voyage: The Puritans set sail on The Annabel, and Mary was befriended by Martha. Pastor Cornwell suffered from seasickness asked Mary to be his scribe. The ship passes many icebergs and whales and see the Northern Lights. In a violent storm one of the women is in labour and Mary helps giving mouth-to-mouth resuscitation to the baby afterwards. Eventually they arrive at Salem.
New World:The Puritans do not see their families in Salem as they believe their forerunners have moved inland. Widow Hesketh in Salem suspects that Mary has 'second sight'. The majority of the puritan group follow them including Mary, and after much discussion they take native guides.
Journey 3: wilderness: They travel inland through great forests as the track narrows and becomes almost impassable as two Pennacooks guide them as they reach Beulah.
Settlement: Mary settles in to the community as they build cabins in preparation for the hard winter. Mary often walks in the forest and sometimes meets Jaybird a native boy who provides her with medicine. Jaybird brings Mary to his grandfather where he senses Mary's grandmother as a hare. Martha warns Mary not to wander into the forest as rumours about her spread.
Witness: Mary is accused of being a witch and manages to flee into the forest.
Testimony: Another narrator writes about Mary's departure as they plan to move away from the settlement.

== Reception ==
- Glasgow's Sunday Herald writes that "Rees has always been able to turn on the suspense for her readers. With this novel she ups the ante, breaking new ground with a superbly plotted and gripping historical novel...A brilliant portrayal of Puritan zeal and paranoia, Witch Child flawlessly evokes the claustrophobic precariousness of early settler America. But what elevates the novel beyond the genre is the ambiguous, enigmatic voice of Mary herself. Rees perfectly captures the haunting tone of a young girl who is both less and more than she seems.
- Lucy Mangan in The Guardian praises the novel: "It's a completely absorbing account of what happens when suspicion and rumour fuel secret agendas, prejudices and politics. A book to make you sigh with satisfaction."
- Emma Poulsen from Brisbane's The Courier-Mail says "Celia Rees writes a compelling story of love, trust, history and old superstitions. Ancient beliefs and the descriptions of harsh punishments for those who step outside the bonds of Christianity also give the book its torment and flavour...This tragic start to the novel is written in the style of an irregularly kept journal. The dates are rough but still the tale takes a rhythm and flows smoothly.
- Kirkus Reviews is quite positive: "The text is haunting despite a lack of antiquity in the language. Perhaps wisely, Rees forgoes emphasizing historical or theological accuracy and instead focuses on providing immediate characters. With its theme of religious intolerance and its touches of the supernatural, this is sure to be in high demand for a long time."
- Publishers Weekly has reservations: "Though the story is filled with authentic-seeming historic detail, Mary behaves more like a 21st-century teenager with a penchant for things New Age than a product of her own era...Hampered by wandering story lines and some stereotyped supporting cast members, this seductive material never quite comes together."

== Sequel ==
Rees decided to split Witch Child as it was becoming too unwieldy. She created the sequel called Sorceress, although it continues Mary's story, it is experienced through Agnes, her present day descendant. The novel was published in 2002.
