= Philippe Corentin =

French author and illustrator (1936–2022)

- Born: Philippe Le Saux; 16 February 1936; Boulogne-Billancourt, France
- Died: 7 November 2022 (aged 86); Saint-Lubin-de-la-Haye, France
- Occupations: Author illustrator

Philippe Corentin, pseudonym of Philippe Le Saux, (February 16, 1936 – November 7, 2022) was a French youth author and illustrator.

== Biography ==
After spending his childhood in Quimper with his twin brother, artist Alain Le Saux, Corentin began publishing comics in the magazine L'Enragé in 1968.

Corentin used cheeky and malicious humor in his books, such as his story to help children overcome their fear of wolves, Patatras, fear of the dark with Papa !, and relations with others in Mademoiselle tout-à-l'envers.

Corentin died in Saint-Lubin-de-la-Haye on 7 November 2022 at the age of 86.

== Books ==
- Conte no 3 (1973)
- Ah ! si j'étais un monstre (1979)
- Le Loup blanc : conte à régler (1980)
- Les Avatars d'un chercheur de querelle (1981)
- Totor et Lili chez les moucheurs de nez (1982)
- Al Capone : le crime organisé (1983)
- C'est à quel sujet ? : questions idiotes (1984)
- Nom d'un chien (1985)
- Porc de pêche et autres drôles de bêtes (1985)
- Papa n'a pas le temps (1986)
- Guide SAS (1988)
- Mademoiselle tout-à-l'envers (1988)
- Pie, thon et python : rébus (1988)
- La Flèche du Parthe : ou comment suivre à la lettre les mots grecs et latins de notre langue (1989)
- Le Père Noël et les fourmis (1989)
- Le Chien qui voulait être chat (1989)
- 365 devinettes, énigmes et menteries (1990)
- L'Afrique de Zigomar (1990)
- Pipioli la terreur (1990)
- Plouf ! (1991)
- L'Ogrionne (1991)
- Zigomar n'aime pas les légumes (1992)
- Biplan, le rabat-joie (1992)
- Le Roi et le roi (1993)
- Zigomar n'aime pas du tout les légumes et il a bien raison (1993)
- Patatras ! (1994)
- Papa ! (1995)
- L'Ogre, le loup, la petite fille et le gâteau (1995)
- Papa, maman, ma sœur et moi (1996)
- Les Deux Goinfres (1996)
- Mademoiselle Sauve-qui-peut (1996)
- Tête à claques (1998)
- L'Arbre en bois (1999)
- Machin chouette (2002)
- Zzzz...zzzz... : d'après une histoire vraie (2007)
- N'oublie pas de te laver les dents ! (2009)
- Zigomar et zigotos (2012)
- Questions idiotes (2017)

== Awards ==
- Prix Sorcières for L'Afrique de Zigomar (1991)
- Prix Sorcières for L'Ogre, le loup, la petite fille et le gâteau (1996)
- Kinderbuchpreis des Landes Nordrhein-Westfalen for Plouf ! (1996)
- Grand Prix du Livre de Jeunesse of the Société des gens de lettres for Mademoiselle Sauve-qui-peut (1997)
- "List of Honor" of the International Board on Books for Young People for Mademoiselle Sauve-qui-peut (1997)
- Schnabelsteherpreis for Papa ! (1998)
- "List of Honor" of the International Board on Books for Young People for Mademoiselle Sauve-qui-peut (1998)
