= Véronique (given name) =

Véronique is a French feminine given name (etymologically derived from the Latin name Veronica). It may refer to:

- Véronique Ançay (born 1970), Swiss ski mountaineer
- Véronique Augereau (born 1957), French voice actress
- Véronique Béliveau (born 1955), Canadian actress and pop/rock singer
- Veronique Belleter (born 1977), Belgian cyclist
- Véronique Besse (born 1963), French politician
- Véronique Boiry (born 1948), French illustrator
- Véronique Bonnecaze, French pianist
- Veronique Branquinho (born 1973), Belgian fashion designer
- Véronique Brisy (born 1960), Belgian swimmer
- Véronique Brouquier (born 1957), French fencer
- Véronique Chankowski (born 1971), French historian
- Véronique Cloutier (born 1974), French Canadian TV and radio personality
- Véronique Delobel (born 1978), French retired competitive ice dancer
- Véronique Genest (born 1956), French actress
- Véronique Gens (born 1966), French soprano
- Véronique Jannot (born 1957), French actress and singer
- Véronique Leu-Govind, Mauritian politician
- Véronique Louwagie (born 1961), French politician
- Véronique Mang (born 1984), track and field sprint athlete
- Véronique Marot (born 1955), English former elite long-distance runner
- Véronique Mathieu (born 1955), French politician and Member of the European Parliament
- Véronique Müller (born 1948), Swiss singer
- Véronique Romagnoli (born 1966), French footballer
- Véronique Sanson (born 1949), French singer
- Véronique Silver (1931–2010), French actress
- Véronique Tadjo (born 1955), Ivorian writer, poet, novelist and artist
- Véronique Vendell (born 1942), French actress

== See also ==
- Veronica (name)
