= Ryōji Arai =

Japanese illustrator (born 1956)

Ryōji Arai (荒井 良二) (born 1956) is a Japanese illustrator. For his career contribution to "children's and young adult literature in the broadest sense" he won the Astrid Lindgren Memorial Award from the Swedish Arts Council in 2005, one of the largest cash prizes in children's literature.

== Life ==
Arai was born in Yamagata in 1956 and educated at Nihon University Yamagata Junior & Senior High School. He studied art at Nihon University and he lives in Tokyo. His first published work was the picture book Melody in 1990. That year he won the "Grand Award for new illustrators" (quoting the Swedish Arts Council).
