= Brigitte Smadja =

Tunisian-born French author (1955–2023)

- Born: 12 May 1955; Tunis, French protectorate of Tunisia
- Died: 15 February 2023 (aged 67); Paris, France
- Education: École normale supérieure de Fontenay-Saint-Cloud
- Occupation: Author

Brigitte Smadja (12 May 1955 – 15 February 2023) was a Tunisian-born French author.

== Biography ==
Born in Tunis in 1955 to a Jewish family, Smadja was eight years old when her family left for France, settling first in Sarcelles and next in Goutte d'Or. As a child, she dreamed of becoming an airline pilot, but instead pursued literary studies at the École normale supérieure de Fontenay-Saint-Cloud. She subsequently became a French teacher in a secondary school, a profession she continued alongside her writing career. She also taught French at the Duperré School of Applied Arts.

Smadja's novels mainly discussed love, friendship, justice, differences, racism, and others. Occasionally, her novels had autobiographical elements, as seen in Quand papa était mort and Ne touchez pas aux idoles. She wrote around thirty novels for L'École des loisirs and Actes Sud. For her works, she received numerous prizes, such as the Prix de l'Été du livre in Metz and the Meilleur livre pour la jeunesse of Haute-Loire.

Smadja died in Paris on 15 February 2023.

== Works ==
=== Youth novels ===
- Billie (1991)
- J'ai décidé de m'appeler Dominique (1991)
- Maxime fait de la politique (1991)
- Maxime fait des miracles (1992)
- Marie est amoureuse (1992)
- Marie souffre le martyre (1992)
- J'ai hâte de vieillir (1992)
- Drôles de zèbres (1992)
- Maxime fait l'idiot (1993)
- Ma princesse aime les saucisses (1993)
- Ne touchez pas aux idoles (1994)
- Halte aux livres ! (1994)
- Pauline n'a pas sa clé (1994)
- Qu'aimez-vous le plus au monde ? (1994)
- Une Bentley boulevard Voltaire (1995)
- Ma princesse se déguise en casserole (1995)
- La tarte aux escargots (1995)
- Laisse-moi tranquille (1996)
- Quand papa était mort (1996)
- Le cabanon de l'oncle Jo (1996)
- Ma princesse collectionne les nuages (1996)
- La vérité toute nue (1997)
- Ma princesse disparaît dans le couloir (1997)
- Ma princesse n'est plus ma princesse (1998)
- Rollermania (1999)
- Superglu (1999)
- Un trésor bien caché (1999)
- Ce n'est pas de ton âge ! (2000)
- La plus belle du royaume (2000)
- Maxime fait un beau mariage (2000)
- Une histoire à dormir debout (2001)
- Un poisson nommé Jean-Paul (2001)
- J’ai rendez-vous avec Samuel (2002)
- Bleu blanc gris : théâtre (2002)
- Adieu Maxime (2003)
- Il faut sauver Saïd (2003)
- Le ventre d'Achille (2003)
- Mon zamie (2006)
- Dans la famille Briard, je demande... Jenny (2006)
- Dans la famille Briard, je demande... Joseph (2006)
- Dans la famille Briard, je demande... Margot (2006)
- Lilou (2007)
- Ted et Bill (2007)
- Nina Titi (2008)
- Un week-end d'enfer (2009)
- Oublie-moi un peu, papa ! (2012)
- Le cœur est un muscle fragile (2016)

=== Collaboration ===
- Mon royaume est un cheval (with Susie Morgenstern, Christian Oster & Yann Coridian, 2011)

=== Youth series ===
- Les Pozzis (2009–2015)

=== Adult novels ===
- Le Jaune est sa couleur (1997)
- Des cœurs découpés (1999)
- Mausolée (2001)
- Une éclaircie est annoncée (2003)
- Natures presque mortes (2006)
- Le Jour de la finale (2008)

== Awards ==
- "Honour List" of the International Board on Books for Young People for La Tarte aux escargots (1998)
- Prix Sorcières for Il faut sauver Saïd (2004)
