= My Afternoons with Margueritte =

- Theatrical release poster
- Directed by: Jean Becker
- Screenplay by: Jean Becker; Jean-Loup Dabadie
- Story by: Amélie Bérard
- Based on: My Afternoons with Margueritte by Marie-Sabine Roger
- Produced by: Louis Becker; Gérard Depardieu
- Starring: Gérard Depardieu; Gisèle Casadesus
- Cinematography: Arthur Cloquet
- Edited by: Jacques Witta
- Music by: Laurent Voulzy
- Production companies: ICE3; K.J.B. Production
- Distributed by: StudioCanal
- Release date: 5 September 2010
- Running time: 82 minutes
- Country: France
- Language: French
- Budget: $9 million
- Box office: $17.1 million

My Afternoons with Margueritte (French: La Tête en friche) is a 2010 French film directed by Jean Becker, based on the book of the same name by Marie-Sabine Roger. It stars Gérard Depardieu, Gisèle Casadesus, Claire Maurier, Maurane, and François-Xavier Demaison. The film tells the story of an illiterate man who bonds with an older, well-read woman.

== Plot ==
Germain is a 45-year-old, illiterate handyman. In flashbacks during the film he is seen as a child, bullied at school for being a slow reader, by both the teachers and other students, and constantly reminded by his mother that he was clumsy and unwanted, and not given much love by her although she protects him when slapped by one of her boyfriends. He is a loyal man, with a good heart but lacking self-esteem. He lives in a trailer parked by his mother's house, where he cultivates a vegetable garden. He earns some extra money by selling his vegetables at the weekly farmers' market, borrowing a truck from the bar where he is a regular customer with his friends. His girl friend Annette is a younger woman who drives the local bus; she truly loves this sweet, simple and loving man.

One afternoon Germain meets Margueritte, a delicate, 95-year-old woman who sits on the same bench with him to feed pigeons. He has observed the 19 birds so often that he knows each and has named them. He discovers that she is highly educated, and learns she had worked as a scientist with the World Health Organization. She lives in a retirement home in the village and reads frequently. They connect over a text from The Plague by Albert Camus. Because Germain is barely literate, Margueritte starts to read the book aloud to him. Slowly he starts to appreciate the beauty of words and sentences, because he is a good listener and he has a vivid imagination. Germain is affected by the symbolism Camus uses in this philosophical novel, expanding his horizons. The pair meet every day to continue their reading sessions. A friendship develops. Margueritte eventually gives him her old dictionary. In it he tries to find words that he's interested in, but because he can't spell, he finds the dictionary too frustrating. He decides to return it when Margueritte invites him to her place for tea.

She tells him that her eyesight is gradually fading, and that she will soon no longer be able to walk unassisted. Germain decides to reverse roles and try to read to her, but first he must improve his reading skills. With Annette's support he learns to read a story aloud to Margueritte. Shortly thereafter, Germain finds his mother dead at home, and is distraught.

At the notary, he learns that his mother owned her house, which he had thought she rented. She had accumulated a sizeable fortune from strict saving, and always intended to bequeath that to him, but had never told him. Meanwhile, Annette announces she is pregnant. Germain had hesitated to have children, believing he could not offer them enough. Annette tells him not to worry: he can give love. When Margueritte is forced to leave her retirement home for a lesser one in Flanders, she puts aside her dictionary for Germain. He traces her down and brings her back to live with him at his mother's house. On their return, he reads her a poem written for her.

== Cast ==
- Gérard Depardieu as Germain Chazes
- Gisèle Casadesus as Margueritte
- Claire Maurier as Jacqueline
- Maurane as Francine
- François-Xavier Demaison as Gardini, the younger Jacqueline's lover
- Anne Le Guernec as Jacqueline
- Amandine Chauveau as a younger Jacqueline
- Sophie Guillemin as Annette
- Florian Yven as Germain as a child
- Patrick Bouchitey as Landremont
- Régis Laspalès as M. Bayle
- Jean-François Stévenin as Joseph, the cook
- Lyes Salem as Youssef
- Matthieu Dahan as Julien
- Bruno Ricci as Marco
- Mélanie Bernier as Stéphanie

== Background ==
In the final credits the following towns are acknowledge as locations of filming: Pons, Rochefort, Cozes, Cognac and Chateaubernard.

Novels used as reading matter for Margueritte and Germain are La Peste by Albert Camus, La Promesse de l'aube by Romain Gary and L'Enfant de la haute mer by Jules Supervielle.

== Reception ==
On review aggregator website Rotten Tomatoes, the film holds an approval rating of 85% based on 60 reviews, and an average rating of 6.4/10. The website's critical consensus reads, "It's sentimental and treacly, but that's not enough to prevent My Afternoons with Margueritte from being truly affecting." On Metacritic, the film has a weighted average score of 59 out of 100, based on 16 critics, indicating "mixed or average reviews".
