= Sylvie Weil =

French writer

Sylvie Weil (born 1942) is a French professor and writer. She is known for her novels for children and her writing about her prominent intellectual family, which includes André Weil and Simone Weil.

== Biography ==
Weil was born in the United States in 1942. Her family moved to Brazil when she was three and then to Chicago when she was five. Much of her education took place in Paris.

Weil is the daughter of mathematician André Weil and the niece of the philosopher Simone Weil. Weil never met her aunt, who died in England shortly after Sylvie was born in the US. It is said that the two women shared "an uncanny physical resemblance". Weil's memoir about her family, Chez les Weil: André et Simone, was translated into English as At Home with André and Simone Weil.

In 2002, Weil won the Prix Sorcières, a prize for French-language children's literature, for her novel Le Mazal d'Elvina. The English translation, My Guardian Angel, was named a Sydney Taylor Honor Book for Older Readers in 2004, and the sequel Elvina's Mirror was named a Sydney Taylor Notable Book for Older Readers in 2010. The Sydney Taylor awards recognize distinguished contributions to Jewish children's literature.
