= Rébecca Dautremer =

French illustrator (born 1971)

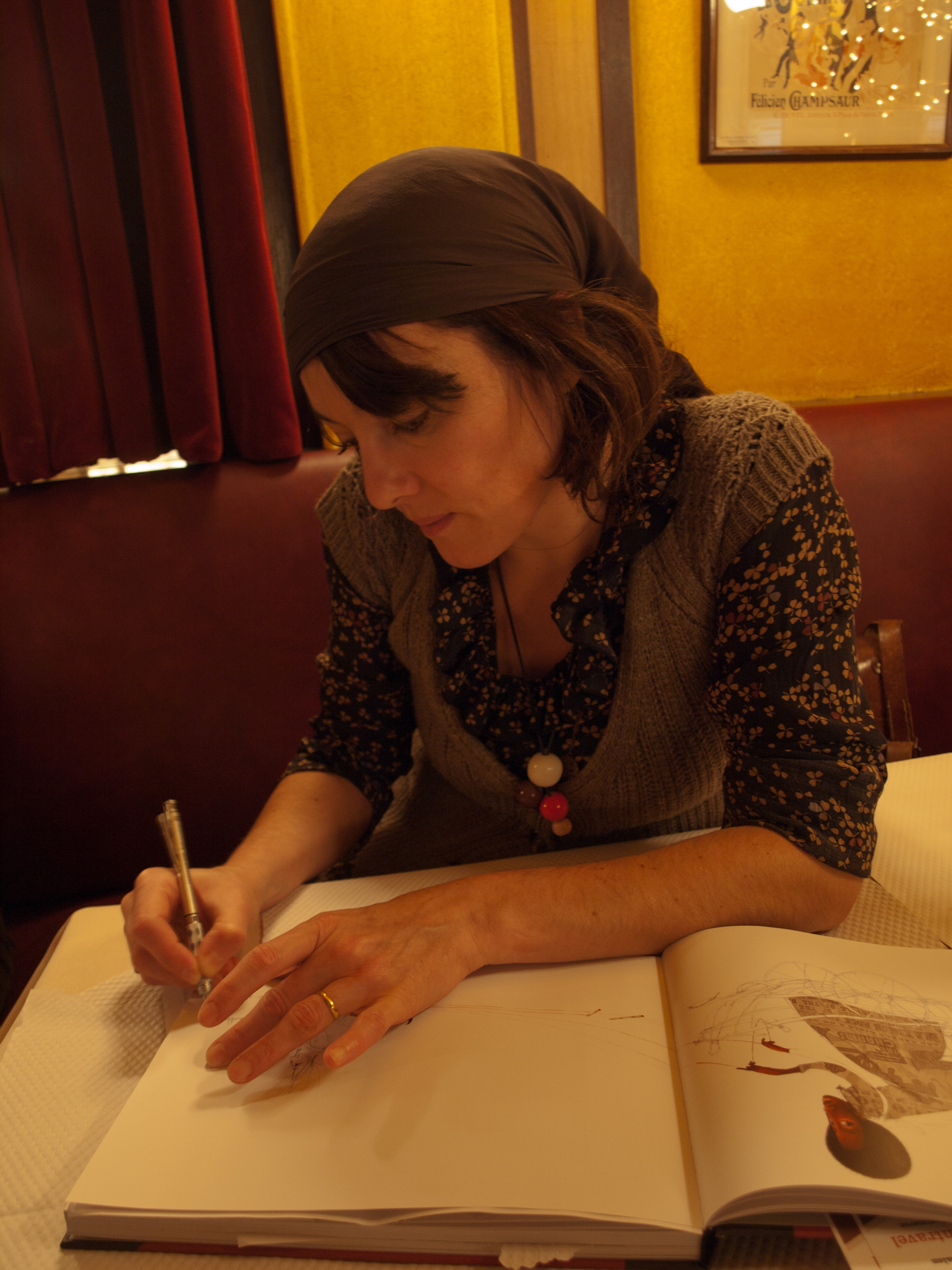
Rébecca Dautremer in 2012

Rébecca Dautremer (born 1971) is a French illustrator and children's literature author.

Dautremer was born in Gap, Hautes-Alpes in 1971. She studied graphic design at the École nationale supérieure des arts décoratifs. She is married to author Taï-Marc Le Thanh, with whom she collaborates professionally. Dautremer began publishing children's books in 2003 with L'Amoureux, for which she won the Prix Sorcières. Her illustrations are typically paintings done with gouache. She took an early interest in photography, but she switched to illustration in 1996. Photography heavily influenced Dautremer's work in illustration, particularly in her emphasis on lighting. Her work was cited as a major influence on the art style of The Magician's Elephant.

== Published works ==
- L'Amoureux (transl. The Lover) (2003)
- Princesses oubliées ou inconnues (transl. The Secret Lives of Princesses) (2004)
- Une bible (transl. The Bible) (2014)
- Les Riches Heures de Jacominus Gainsborough (transl. The Rich Hours of Jacominus Gainsborough) (2018)
- Midi pile (transl. High Noon) (2019)
