= Marie-Sabine Roger =

French writer (born 1957)

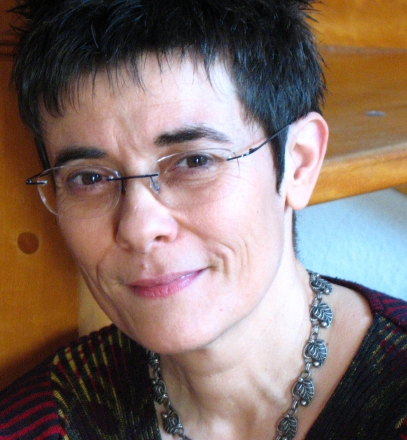
Marie-Sabine Roger in 2007

Marie-Sabine Roger (born 19 September 1957, Bordeaux) is a French writer.

== Biography ==
Published for the first time in 1989 in youth literature, Marie-Sabine Roger has not stopped writing since, in very varied registers, picture books and story books for children, novels for adolescents and adults, short stories for adults, and more recently, collaboration with scenarios for the cinema, with Jean Becker. For the past few years, she has been targeting mainly adult readers, while continuing to write picture books for very young readers.

== Works ==
=== Children's literature ===
==== Picture books ====
- 1989: 3 histoires de moutons - Éditions Lito
- 1991: 3 histoires d'extraterrestres - Éditions Lito
- 1993: Philomène Chontard sorcière ! - Éditions Epigones
- 1993: 3 histoires de magicien, de dragons et de sorcière - Éditions Lito
- 1994: Un dragon drôlement pénible
- 1994: Titoine et tante Ursule
- 1994: Titoine Dradeli, fantôme
- 1994: L’Inquiétante Madame Crochu
- 1994: L’Île du Prince Jamal
- 1994: Les Draps de Titoine
- 1995: Une souris très enrhumée - Éditions Lito
- 1995: Mystères et chuchotis
- 1995: Le Vampire de l'abribus
- 1995: Le Coup de foudre
- 1995: La Fée de juillet
- 1995: La Chose du 2e sous-sol
- 1996: Zibeline n°1 : Gare à l'ogre
- 1996: Voisin rime avec assassin
- 1996: Titoine, l'abominable Grignoton
- 1996: Titoine, les horribles monstres
- 1996: Titebulle et Cailloupatte
- 1997: Titoine, quel cirque !
- 1998: Petitpain le Lutin
- 1998: J’apprends à lire avec les images : Le grand voyage du Roi Minuscule
- 1999: Mon papa ne veut pas de chien à la maison
- 1999: La Souris des dents
- 2000: J’apprends à lire avec les images : La sorcière Sorciflette
- 2000: J’apprends à lire avec les images : Le clown Pantoufle est en retard
- 2000: Coton, le petit mouton
- 2001: Je veux tous mes doudous
- 2001: Comment se débarrasser de ses voisins
- 2001: Bleu silence
- 2002: Un volcan en pétard
- 2002: Tanguy l'Azur
- 2002: Pitié pour les voleurs !
- 2002: Monsieur Noël
- 2002: Chocottons d'avoir si trouille
- 2002: 1...2...3... Noël !
- 1994: Onésime et le diable
- 1997: Bon anniversaire Philomène
- 1997: Le Piège à fées

==== Novels ====
- 1997: Le Vent de la colère - Éditions Hachette
- 1997: Le Mystère Esteban - Éditions Hachette
- 1998: À la vie, à la... - Éditions Nathan
- 1999: Sauve-toi, sauve-nous - Éditions Nathan
- 1996: Voisin rime avec assassin
- 1997: Les Sources du mal - Éditions Hachette
- 1997: Bon anniversaire Philomène
- 1997: Le Piège à fées
- 1998: Pitié pour les voleurs
- 2000: Attention fragiles - Ado
- 2000: Dakil le magnifique - Fantasy
- 2001: Le Château de Pierre
- 2002: La Moitié gauche de la lune - Nouvelles
- 2002: La Saison des singes
- 2002: Attention fragiles ! - Ado
- 2003: Dakil, roi des gnomes - Fantasy
- 2004: Le Quatrième Soupirail - Ado
- 2004: Le Royaume des reines - Ado
- 2004: Une poignée d’argile - Ado
- 2007: L’Odyssée de Dakil le Grand - Fantasy
- 2008: Et tu te soumettras à la loi de ton père - Éditions Thierry Magnier

=== Adult literature ===
==== Novels ====
- 2001: Le ciel est immense - Éditions Le Relié
- 2004: Un simple viol - Éditions Grasset
- 2009: La tête en friche - Éditions du Rouergue (published in English as Soft in the Head, Pushkin Press 2016, translated by Frank Wynne)
- 2010: Vivement l’avenir - Éditions du Rouergue
- 2012: Bon Rétablissement - Éditions du Rouergue (published in English as Get Well Soon, Pushkin Press 2017, translated by Frank Wynne)
- 2014: Trente-six chandelles - Éditions du Rouergue
- 2016 : Dans les prairies étoilées - Éditions du Rouergue

==== Short stories ====
- 2003: La Théorie du chien perché - Éditions Thierry Magnier
- 2007: Les Encombrants - Éditions Thierry Magnier
- 2010: Il ne fait jamais noir en ville - Éditions Thierry Magnier

== Cinematographic adaptations ==
- 2010: My Afternoons with Margueritte, movie directed by Jean Becker, with Gérard Depardieu (Germain) and Gisèle Casadesus (Margueritte).
- 2014: Get Well Soon, movie directed by Jean Becker, with Gérard Lanvin (Pierre).

== Distinctions ==
- 2006: Prix Sorcières in the adolescent novels category for Le Quatrième soupirail.
- 2008: Prix de la nouvelle francophone Nanterre for Les Encombrants (éditions Thierry Magnier)
- 2009: Prix Inter-CE for La tête en friche (éditions du Rouergue)
- 2009: Cezam Prix Littéraire Inter CE for La tête en friche (éditions du Rouergue)
- 2010: Prix Marguerite Audoux for Vivement l'avenir (éditions du Rouergue)
- 2011: Prix des lycéens allemands for La tête en friche (éditions du Rouergue)
- 2011: Prix littéraire des Hebdos en Région for Vivement l'avenir, éditions du Rouergue)
- 2011: Prix Handilivres for Vivement l'avenir (éditions du Rouergue)
- 2012: Prix des lecteurs de l'Express for Bon rétablissement (éditions du Rouergue)
