= Lucy Lost =

2026 French film by Olivier Clert

- Theatrical film poster
- French: Le mystère Lucy Lost
- Directed by: Olivier Clert
- Screenplay by: Olivier Clert; Helen Blakeman
- Based on: Listen to the Moon by Michael Morpurgo
- Produced by: Marc du Pontavice; Lucie Bolze
- Starring: Charlie Rosenzweig; Zach Valentin-Dattas; Jessica Monceau; Quentin Faure; Keanu Peyran
- Edited by: Ivy Buirette; Guillaume Vantroys
- Music by: Anne-Sophie Versnaeyen
- Production company: Xilam Animation
- Distributed by: Le Pacte
- Release dates: 19 May 2026 (Cannes); 28 October 2026 (France)
- Running time: 89 minutes
- Country: France
- Language: French
- Budget: €8,5 million

Lucy Lost (French: Le mystère Lucy Lost) is a 2026 French animated mystery-historical film directed by Olivier Clert, co-written with Helen Blakeman, and adapted from 2014 children's novel Listen to the Moon by British author Michael Morpurgo. It is produced by Xilam Animation. Set during World War I, it follows the young girl Lucy, who is raised by a clan of fishermen on small remote island.

The film had its world premiere in the Special Screenings section of the 2026 Cannes Film Festival on 19 May. It was theatrically released in France by Le Pacte on 28 October.

== Plot ==
Lucy lives with her family in a village on a small, isolated island. Her extraordinary gifts are met with rejection by the villagers. When she meets Milly, a little girl only she can see, Lucy embarks on a great adventure to uncover the secret of her mysterious powers.

== Voice cast ==
Character	French
Lucy	Charlie Rosenzweig
Milly McKenzie	Charlie Rosenzweig
Alfie	Zach Valentin-Dattas
Mary	Jessica Monceau
Jim	Quentin Faure
Zeb	Keanu Peyran
Dave	Benjamin Penamaria
Willy	Gustave Briere
Polly	Haïly Yseembourg
Elizabeth	Léonie Didier-Chiara
Miss Nightgale	Leslie Lipkins
Doctor Crow	Luc Antoine Diquero
Mr. Beagley	Nicolas Marie
Kenny	Rafael Didier-Chiara
Child	Titouan Daviaud
Mr. Jenkins	Serge Biavan
Officer	Jochen Haegele
Mrs. McKenzie	Marie Diot
Amos	Marc-Antoine Frederic
Abel	Vincent Paillier
Silas	Thierry Jahn
Villager	Béatrice Michel
Matron	Juliette Poissonnier
Passenger	Bénédicte Bosc
Steward	Lionel Laget
Nurse	Sophie Ouaknine

The English dub of the film will be recorded in the United Kingdom.

== Production ==
Marc du Pontavice first read Listen to the Moon in 2017, when he was having a drink with an artist Xilam collaborated with, and he recommended it to du Pontavice and that he thought the "themes of family, love and memory against a backdrop of vivid landscapes, would translate beautifully to the screen". After acquiring the rights to the book, his original idea was to adapt the novel into a 10-episode television miniseries as announced in 2019, which was originally to be directed by Jean-Christophe Dessaint and it would be fully animated in CGI, with a final 2D rendering. Helen Blakeman came on board for the script of the project then a miniseries in 2020.

Du Pontavice struggled due to its bifurcated structure, which was across two parallel narrative threads and that the crew had great difficulty adapting the story, which worked very well in the novel but was hard to translate to the screen. The original budget as a miniseries was $6 million. Olivier Clert had just returned from the United States, where he had worked on several films, and was looking to find out what was happening in France when a friend of the director showed him the initial research for the project, which he found fascinating. He wanted to be involved in the film, as the project had stalled. The contact who assisted him in the process seemed interested in his suggestions. After Clert met du Pontavice in 2022, he convinced him to turn the project into a theatrical film instead, by deciding that they would tell Lucy's story and by uniting the different narrative strands of the book by bringing Milly, who exists in another plot of the novel, directly into the Lucy's world, which du Pontavice really liked, where Clert developed it by creating a complete storyboard, editing it with voice acting and music, making it look like a movie. Clert joined the project later, after seeing some early visual materials at Xilam, as he was drawn to their timeless quality. Originally, he was only going to contribute as a storyboard artist, but he soon became more deeply involved in developing the story.

The film was fully animated in a mix of traditional animation and 3D, with some parts of the animation were done at Gao Shan Pictures in Réunion in the Indian Ocean and cleanup and color were carried out at Xilam's studio in Vietnam. Olivier Clert personally created the storyboard for the entire film, single-handedly drawing and planning the staging for its 1,800 shots. Adobe After Effects was used to create the wind in the feature film, while the voices were recorded before the animation was completed and voice casting tests were conducted for the film's child roles. The crew chose to incorporate suggestions from the child actors rather than imposing a rigid style of performance. The film's art direction of the production was directed by Joyce Colson, with graphics created by Jade Khoo and animation direction by Carlo Toselli. The film's crew conducted extensive research, primarily in the Isles of Scilly, the setting for the story, traveling there to take numerous photographs. Clert created his storyboards before heading to the islands.

The film's team did not show the visuals to the book's author Michael Morpurgo until they had a completed animatic, which was a first animated version of the storyboard and they received a compliment from Morpurgo, who said he wished to have seen the film before he wrote the book. Du Pontavice noted that, during the writing, storyboarding and production of the film, the story and the book upon which it was based took on new relevance given the conflicts in Ukraine, Gaza and Iran between 2022 and 2026, unfolding in a world becoming increasingly polarized and rife with suspicion, hatred and rejection. He also said the film is a response to the fear of artificial intelligence in animation, given that it is a feature film that is absolutely impossible to create using AI, both technically and artistically and that artificial intelligence is incapable of venturing into this territory. One element not originally in the book was Lucy having white hair caused by trauma; this detail was absent from the original novel. When the film's director, Olivier Clert, began developing the story, he read a book on the folktales and legends of the Isles of Scilly and came across the story the children tell in the film, that white hair is the mark of a witch and cited by Marc du Pontavice as a well-identified psychological phenomenon, given that people of all ages experience a total loss of hair pigmentation due to trauma. Although this was not in the book and was added for the film, Morpurgo liked it. Regarding the theme of violence in Lucy's story, Clert noted that, as a child, he witnessed examples of resilience, courage, and mutual support in the face of adversity, experiences that proved helpful to him. He wanted to create a film in that same vein, one that had resonated with him during his own childhood. Du Pontavice, meanwhile, argued that it would be a mistake to view going to the cinema merely as an escape from the real world; rather, encountering the mechanisms of violence through a story is an integral part of a child's development. It offers them a potential framework for interpreting and coping with violence, and can also foster dialogue between children and their parents. The final budget as a feature film was €8,5 million.

The film's original score was composed by Anne-Sophie Versnaeyen; the first phase of recording took place at Studio Polyson in Montreuil. For the session, Jean-Michel Tavernier assembled a small 14-piece string section, conducted by Gisèle Gérard-Tolini, alongside a 6-piece woodwind group and an 8-piece brass section. Several soloists joined the orchestral ensemble, chosen for their unique timbres and ability to enrich the film's soundscape, including singer Isabel Sörlig, Marc Chouarain on the Cristal Baschet, and a nyckelharpa player. The viola and ukulele parts were recorded by Versnaeyen herself. The second phase took place at Studio British Grove in London; the session involved recording a larger string section with 33 musicians conducted by Andrew Skeet, known for his work with the band The Divine Comedy. The Trinity Boys & Girls Choir, a group of 15 young singers, was also recorded in London, lending the soundtrack a choral dimension. Orchestration was handled by the film's composer Anne-Sophie Versnaeyen and Ben Foskett, while recording and mixing were carried out by Fiona Cruikshank, Vincent Joinville, and Cédric Culnaërt.

== Release ==
The film was released in France on 28 October 2026 by distributor Le Pacte, it was previously provisionally scheduled for release in early 2027. Canal+ and Ciné+ OCS signed on for the French pay television rights. It first premiered at the 2026 Cannes Film Festival as a Family Screening on 19 May 2026 and at the Annecy International Animation Film Festival on 24 June 2026. It made its UK premiere on 10 November 2026, at the Manchester Animation Festival.

The film's soundtrack was released by Milan Records in digital, CD, and vinyl formats, with the vinyl version featuring exclusive cover art. The CD and vinyl editions were released on 30 October, while the digital album was launched two days earlier, coinciding with the film's premiere, on 28 October.

== Reception ==
=== Box office ===
The film opened on 28 October 2026 with 37,063 admissions during its opening week in France, having a modest box-office debut in its first week. By the second week of its run, it had 16,055 admissions, seeing a slight increase to a total of 53,117. In its third week in theaters, it saw an increase of 19,358, bringing the total to 72,476.

=== Critical reception ===
The film received a positive reception with the critics. In his review for Variety, Guy Lodge praised the film's visual style, noting the influence of classic Studio Ghibli, particularly in the character designs and drawing parallels to When Marnie Was There. He also mentioned the liberties director Olivier Clert and co-screenwriter Helen Blakeman took with Michael Morpurgo's original novel, changes that worked well from a cinematic standpoint, but noted that "children much younger than the book's preteen target audience may be left a little adrift." Lodge notes that the film takes its time revealing its hand during a leisurely paced first half, but he says is not a bad thing.

Wendy Ide, writing for Screen Daily, praised the character design, noting that it evokes certain female protagonists from Studio Ghibli, but she pointed out that it represents a missed opportunity to give the film a more distinctive visual identity. Ide praised Anne-Sophie Versnaeyen's score for the feature film, noting how it tells its own story, such as at the beginning of the film, where the use of the harp lends Lucy's journey a delicate yet unsettling quality, while also gaining body and substance through richer orchestration as Lucy's friendship with Milly develops.

Samuel Douhaire for the Télérama magazine, described the film as a "subtle and profound poetic tale", and noted its visual richness, with compositions that call to mind the films of Hayao Miyazaki. Elise Lépine of Le Point described the film's plot as a grand story about humanity, resilience, and adventure, wrapped in magnificent imagery and its soundtrack as superb. Pauline Croquet of Le Monde deemed the film "unmissable" and appreciated the adaptation of the powerful imagery from Morpurgo's original novel, thanks to the work done on the backgrounds and lighting.

=== Accolades ===
Award	Date of ceremony	Category	Recipients	Result	Ref.
Golden Goblet Awards	20 June 2026	Best Animated Film	Olivier Clert	Won	
Annecy International Animation Film Festival	27 June 2026	Cristal for a Feature Film	Olivier Clert	Nominated	
TAURON Young Horizons	4 October 2026	People's Choice Award	Olivier Clert	Won	
TAURON Young Horizons	4 October 2026	Jury Prize in the Main Competition	Olivier Clert	Won	
Mauvais Tours Festival	19 October 2026	Audience Award	Olivier Clert	Won	
Animazur Festival	19 October 2026	Kids' Jury Prize	Olivier Clert	Won	
Juniorfest	10 November 2026	10-13 years Special Mention	Olivier Clert	Won	
European Film Awards	16 January 2027	European Animated Film	Olivier Clert	Pending	
European Film Awards	16 January 2027	European Film	Olivier Clert	Pending	
