= Listen to the Moon =

2014 British children's novel

- Author: Michael Morpurgo
- Language: English
- Genre: Children's literature
- Set in: World War I
- Publisher: HarperCollins
- Publication date: 25 September 2014
- Publication place: Great Britain
- Pages: 437
- ISBN: 978-0-00-794401-9
- OCLC: 892669678

Listen to the Moon is a British children's novel written by Michael Morpurgo. It was originally published in Great Britain by HarperCollins in September 2014, to coincide with the centenary commemorations of World War I, in which the novel's time period is set in. The inspiration for the novel was the sinking of the British civilian liner, the Lusitania, which was torpedoed by a German U-boat in 1915.

The book was short-listed for the Costa Book Award, and also short-listed for the UK Children's Book Award. In 2016, under the French title, Le mystère de Lucy Lost, it was awarded the Prix Sorcières in the junior novels category. In 2024, French animation studio Xilam Films announced they would be adapting the novel into a family feature film titled Lucy Lost, which was released in 2026.

== Synopsis ==
The story takes place in the Scilly Isles, off the coast of Cornwall, in 1915 during World War I, when German U-boats are constantly patrolling the sea in that region, looking to sink British ships. Young Alfie Wheatcroft, his parents Jim and Mary and Uncle Billy live on the island of Bryher, and make a living by fishing and farming. One day Alfie skips school to go fishing for mackerel with his dad, as mackerel is a preference of his mother, and if they catch some, it might take the sting out of the scolding he is sure to get for skipping school.

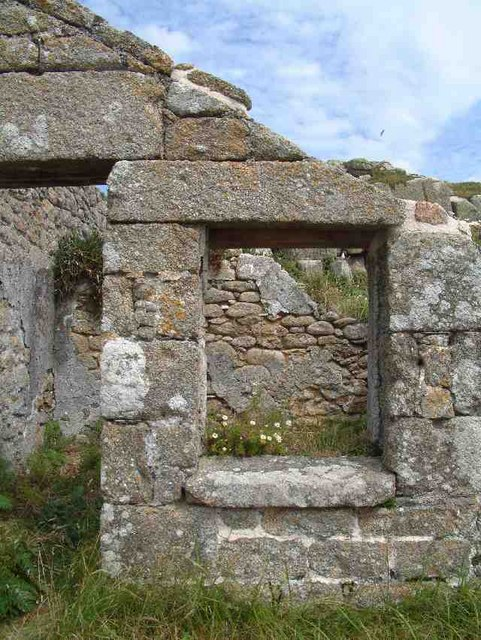
The actual ruined pest house on St Helen's, where the fictional character Lucy is found in the book.

Alfie suggests they row over to St Helen's, an abandoned island, where he is sure there are mackerel to be caught. After catching three fish, Alfie hears what he believes to be crying coming from the island, so they row over to the island to investigate. What they find is a young girl hiding out in a dilapidated pest house, a quarantine building that previously housed diseased sailors, who arrived on visiting ships to the Scilly Isles. She is clutching a teddy bear and a blanket with a German name sewn on it, and is obviously sick and traumatised, and she can't speak other than to utter the name "Lucy". Father and son take her back to their home, where she is taken in and cared for by Mary and the kindhearted village doctor. Lucy Lost, as they now call her, slowly starts to regain her physical health, but she still remains silent. As she gets better, they discover she likes to draw, and has a knack for taming their grumpy workhorse named Peg.

As the months go by, they still don't know her real identity or how she got to the abandoned island in the first place. She starts to attend school with Alfie, but she still does not speak. Initially, the villagers are just intrigued with her presence, but when word gets out around town,that she was found with a blanket with a German name sewn on it, the villagers become paranoid and suspicious, thinking she might actually be a German spy sent to the island, and the family and doctor begin to be shunned and ostracised by the folks in town. Towards the end of the story, Uncle Billy has sailed off, with no one knowing where he was headed to. He eventually returns to the island with a German sailor named Willhelm Kreuz, whom he found and saved from drowning. When the sailor sees Lucy, he recognises her, and tells the story of how she was a survivor of the sinking of the Lusitania, and they came across Lucy lying on the ships piano in the middle of the ocean, so they rescued her, and brought her to St. Helen's, and he is the one who had given Lucy his blanket.

Miraculously, Lucy recovers her voice finally, and thanks Wilhelm for saving her, and announces to the stunned crowd that has gathered – I am not Lucy Lost, I am Merry Macintyre. So she begins to tell them the story of her family and friends; being from New York, and how they boarded the doomed ship that day, and how her family had drowned when the ship was torpedoed. When asked why she uttered the name Lucy when she was found, she replies that she was referring to the Lusitania's nickname, which was "Lusy". Merry finally returns to New York, where she is reunited with her remaining relatives who are ecstatic that she is still alive.

== Background ==
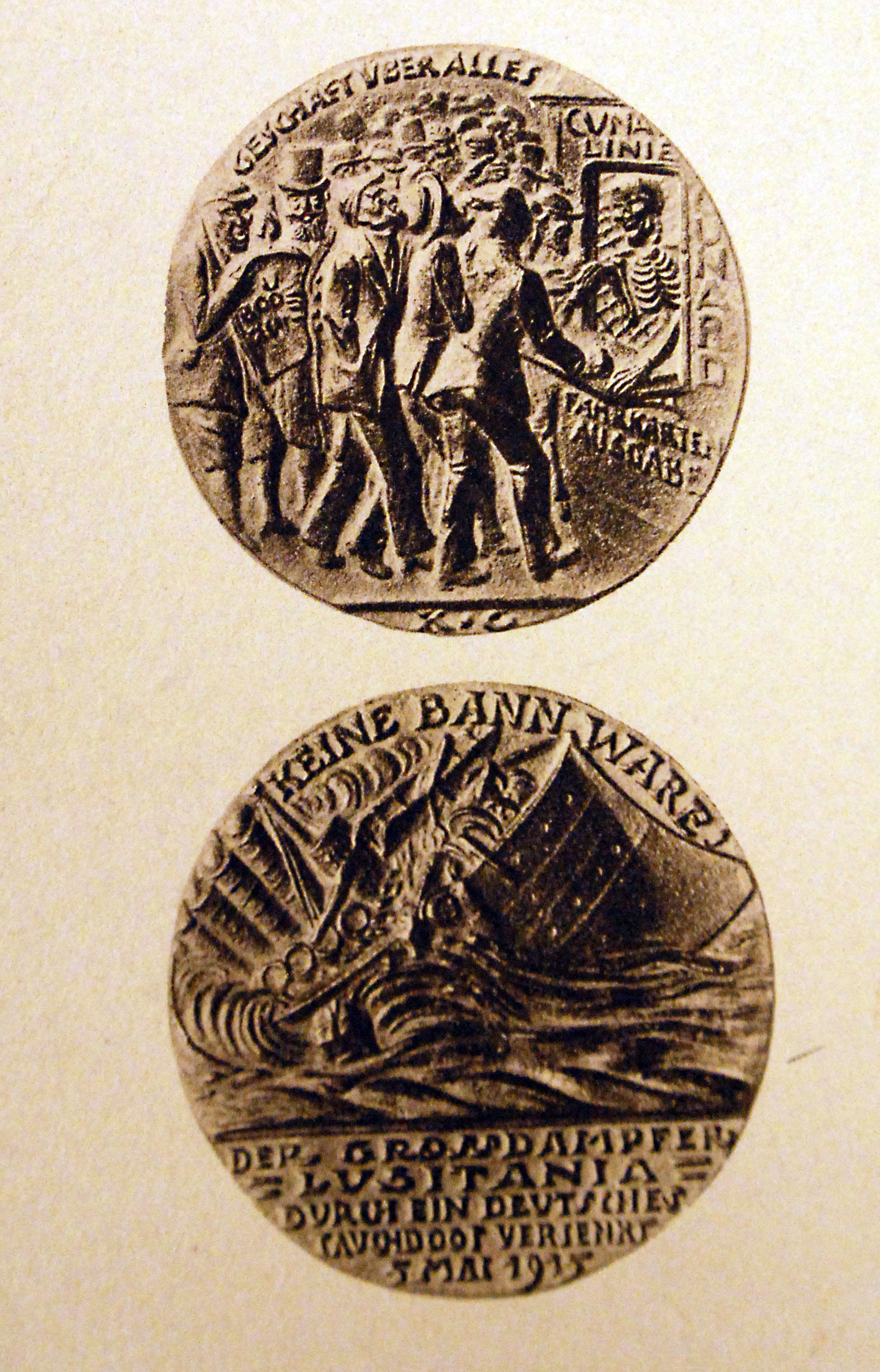
Goetz medal, which Morpurgo refers to, commemorating the sinking of the Lusitania

Morpurgo said the sinking of the Lusitania was what inspired him to write this book. In one instance, he explains that his wife told him a story of when she was around seven-years-old, she had gotten chickenpox, and her family quarantined her in a separate room to avoid infecting other members of the family. And she starting rooting around in a chest of drawers, and found a Lusitania medal hidden amongst her fathers socks. On one side of the medal, there is a skeleton selling tickets to the passengers standing in line, and on the other side, there is the ship depicted going down. He said, "ever since, those two images stayed with him".

He also states that additional research led him to the stories of how the people of Kinsale in southern Ireland, a town near where the ship went down, went out in their boats to rescue some of the passengers, and to retrieve the dead bodies. Morpurgo says he learned from some of those stories that the townspeople had found the ship's grand piano from the dining room of the passenger ship, floating in the ocean, and lying on top of the piano was a child they rescued. He goes on to say that "no one knows who that child was, but I wanted to write the story of who that child might have been and who that child might have become". Morpurgo says these two stories combined, "was the trigger that set it all going".

=== Sinking of the Lusitania ===
RMS Lusitania was a British-registered ocean liner that was torpedoed by an Imperial German Navy U-boat during the First World War on 7 May 1915, about 11 nautical miles (20 kilometres) off the Old Head of Kinsale, Ireland. The attack took place in the declared maritime war-zone around the UK, three months after unrestricted submarine warfare against the ships of the United Kingdom had been announced by Germany following the Allied powers' implementation of a naval blockade against it and the other Central Powers. The passengers had been notified before departing New York of the general danger of voyaging into the area in a British ship, but the attack itself came without warning. From a submerged position 700 m (2,300 ft) to starboard, the German U-20 launched a single torpedo at the Cunard liner. After the torpedo struck, a second explosion occurred inside the ship, which then sank in only 18 minutes. In the end, there were only 763 survivors (39%) out of the 1,960 passengers, crew and stowaways aboard.

== Release ==
Le mystère de Lucy Lost
- Translator: Diane Ménard
- Cover artist: François Place
- Language: French
- Publisher: Gallimard Jeunesse
- Publication date: 2015
- ISBN: 978-2-07-507725-5

The book was originally published in Great Britain by HarperCollins in September 2014, to coincide with the centenary commemorations of the conflict. In 2014, it was short-listed for the Costa Book Award for Children's Book, and also short-listed for The North Herts Book Award. In 2016, it was short-listed for the UK Children's Book Award.

In 2015, it was published by Gallimard Jeunesse in France as Le mystère de Lucy Lost, where it was awarded the Prix Sorcières the following year in the junior novels category. In his review of Le mystère de Lucy Lost, Laurence Bertels wrote in La Libre that "torpedoed during the First World War, it [Lusitania] suffered a fate almost as tragic as the Titanic; Morpurgo slips this documentary dimension with skill into a novel which does not lack breath and whose reading will certainly make young readers grow; another masterpiece".

== Reception ==
Ann Moore wrote in the School Library Journal that "this is a superbly written, gripping novel of friendship, family, healing, and war; this is one of Morpurgo's best works to date". Kirkus Reviews wrote "Morpurgo returns to World War I in a beautifully crafted, multivoiced novel about the sinking of the Lusitania, the strength of family bonds, the vicissitudes of memory, and the fear and bigotry of neighbors; Alfie's third-person tale provides the main storyline, supported by other voices, including excerpts from the doctor's journal and the narrow-minded school principal's records of his horrible teaching theories; it is through Lucy's voice that all the elements of the tale weave together both beautifully and dramatically".

Gail Bush from The Booklist said that "chapters intertwined with the narrative describing Merry’s interests in music, drawing, horses, and the moon help readers understand the girl; while back matter duly describes the tale’s historic and geographic significance, it is Morpurgo’s finely woven tapestry of community, trust, endurance, and unconditional family love that keep the Lusitania best remembered". Anita Lock wrote in BookPage "Morpurgo pens a spellbinding story within a story; the book is nothing short of extraordinary, a masterfully woven tale of history, the negative aspects of war and a subtle yet persistent message that love prevails; Morpurgo closes with background historical information, the perfect endnote to this outstanding piece of literature". Ysenda Graham wrote in Country Life that "Morpurgo's novels are reliably good and annoyingly unputdownable; many usual Morpurgo ingredients are here: the Isles of Scilly, likeable children free to roam and a nasty schoolteacher".

Alison Hurst of the School Librarian said, "it is hardly surprising that this book screams out as a 'must read'; this complex and original story enthrals from page one; the narrative links the calamitous, yet fascinating, sinking of the Lusitania, a little girl discovered, quite wild, on an uninhabited isle in the Scillies, daily life on the Isles of Scilly during that period and personal tragedies; informative, enlightening and, above all, highly enjoyable". Publishers Weekly wrote that "a framing device, built around the research of Lucy's future grandson, allows Morpurgo to shift among multiple narrators: Morpurgo offers powerful descriptions of shipwreck, mass drowning, and devastation, as well as healing and growth".

English writer Tony Bradman opined that "the story has its faults; at 437 pages it is way too long, especially for a 'middle-grade' novel; tt starts well, but the first half is slow and should have been trimmed; and the lengthy extracts from the journal of the local doctor who treats Lucy could easily have been cut: several of the secondary characters – a bully, a nasty headteacher and a crazy uncle – feel rather perfunctory; this might not be vintage Morpurgo, but it is still a pretty good read". Susan Elkin wrote in The Independent that "it's a thoughtful look at the effect of the war on civilians, in Morpurgo's usual sentimental style".

== Film adaptation ==
In 2024, French animation studio Xilam Films announced they would be adapting the novel into a family feature film titled Lucy Lost (Le mystère Lucy Lost), being released on October 28, 2026. The film was produced by Marc du Pontavice, with co-production by Lucie Bolze, and directed by Olivier Clert, in his feature film directorial debut. Helen Blakeman, along with Clert, are the co-writers on the project, while the art direction of the production was directed by Joyce Colson, with graphics created by Jade Khoo, animation direction by Carlo Toselli and the soundtrack was composed by Anne-Sophie Versnaeyen. Gebeka International, a France-based sales company, handles the international sales; Le Pacte is the distributor in France; and Canal+ and Ciné+ signed on for the pay television rights.

Producer Marc du Pontavice said he first read Listen to the Moon in 2017, when he was having a drink with an artist Xilam collaborated with, and he recommended it to du Pontavice and that he thought the "themes of family, love and memory against a backdrop of vivid landscapes, would translate beautifully to the screen". He also said that the original idea was to adapt the novel into a 10-episode television miniseries as announced in 2019, which was originally to be directed by Jean-Christophe Dessaint and it would be fully animated in CGI, with a final 2D rendering, while Blakeman came on board for the script of the project then a miniseries in 2020, but du Pontavice struggled due to its bifurcated structure, which was across two parallel narrative threads and that the crew had great difficulty adapting the story, which worked very well in the novel but was hard to translate to the screen. The original budget as a miniseries was $6 million. After meeting Clert in 2022, he convinced him to make it into a theatrical movie instead, by deciding that they would tell Lucy's story and by uniting the different narrative strands of the book by bringing Milly, who exists in another plot of the novel, directly into the Lucy's world, which du Pontavice really liked, where Clert developed it by creating a complete storyboard, editing it with voice acting and music, making it look like a movie. Olivier Clert joined the project later, after seeing some early visual materials at Xilam, as he was drawn to their timeless quality. Originally, he was only going to contribute as a storyboard artist, but he soon became more deeply involved in developing the story. The film was fully animated in a mix of traditional animation and 3D, with some parts of the animation were done at Gao Shan Pictures in Réunion in the Indian Ocean and cleanup and color were carried out at Xilam's studio in Vietnam. Olivier Clert personally created the storyboard for the entire film, single-handedly drawing and planning the staging for its 1,800 shots. Adobe After Effects was used to create the wind in the feature film, while the voices were recorded before the animation was completed and voice casting tests were conducted for the film's child roles. The French cast features Charlie Rosenzweig as Lucy and Milly, Zach Valentin-Dattas as Alfie, Jessica Monceau as Mary, Quentin Faure as Jim and Keanu Peyran as Zeb. The English dub of the film will be recorded in the United Kingdom. The final budget as a feature film was €8,5 million.

The film's team did not show the visuals to the book's author Michael Morpurgo until they had a completed animatic, which was a first animated version of the storyboard and they received a compliment from Morpurgo, who said he wished to have seen the film before he wrote the book. Du Pontavice noted that, during the writing, storyboarding and production of the film, the story and the book upon which it was based took on new relevance given the conflicts in Ukraine, Gaza and Iran between 2022 and 2026, unfolding in a world becoming increasingly polarized and rife with suspicion, hatred and rejection. He also said the film is a response to the fear of artificial intelligence in animation, given that it is a feature film that is absolutely impossible to create using AI, both technically and artistically and that artificial intelligence is incapable of venturing into this territory.

Screened at the 2026 Cannes Film Festival and Annecy International Animation Film Festival, the film received a positive reception with the critics. Lucy Lost won three awards for Best Animated Film at the 28th Golden Goblet Awards of the Shanghai International Film Festival, as well for People's Choice Award and Jury Prize in the Main Competition at the 13th TAURON Young Horizons Festival.
