= Swedish Arts Council =

Swedish administrative authority

The Swedish Arts Council (Swedish: Statens kulturråd) is a government authority under the Ministry of Culture. Its role is to promote culture and ensure access to culture across Sweden.

The council distributes government grants in line with national cultural policy set by the Riksdag. It also provides the Swedish Government with data to support cultural policy decisions.

Sharing knowledge and supporting development are also key parts of the council’s work. The council encourages more people to read books, works to ensure that more children and young people can attend schools of culture, and promotes equal rights and opportunities for everyone within the cultural sector.

The Swedish Arts Council promotes artistic development in:

- music, theatre, dance and other performing arts
- literature, cultural magazines, reading promotion and libraries
- visual arts and crafts as well as museums and exhibitions
- regional cultural activities
- the culture of the Sami people and the cultures of other national minorities

== History ==
The Swedish Arts Council was established in 1974, following the cultural policy decision of that year. Its mission is to implement the cultural policies decided by the Riksdag and the Government. (Note: Förordning (1974:644) med instruktion för statens kulturråd) (Note: Kungl. Maj:ts proposition angående den statliga kulturpolitiken (Prop. 1974:28)).

== Organisation ==
The council is governed by a board appointed by the Government. The board is responsible for the agency’s overall operations, including strategy, budget and certain grant decisions. It also appoints the Director General. As of 1 April 2026, the agency is led by Acting Director General Klara Tomson.

Since 2021, the Swedish Arts Council has hosted the National School of Culture Coordination Centre (Kulturskolecentrum). In January 2026, the National Council for Handicrafts (Nämnden för hemslöjdsfrågor) was incorporated into the agency.

The council employs around 100 people and is based at Filmhuset in Stockholm.

== International work and awards ==
The Swedish Arts Council plays an important role in international cultural cooperation. It awards grants for international exchange and acts as Sweden’s national contact point for the EU’s Creative Europe programme and UNESCO’s 2005 Convention on cultural diversity of cultural expressions. .

The council administers the Astrid Lindgren Memorial Award, established by the Swedish Government in 2002. It is the world’s largest international award for literature for children and young people and is presented annually.

== See also ==
- Ministry of Culture
- Culture of Sweden
- Arts council
