= Guess How Much I Love You =

1994 children's book by Sam McBratney

- Cover of the original book
- Author: Sam McBratney
- Audio read by: Kevin Whately (audiobooks)
- Illustrator: Anita Jeram
- Language: English
- Publisher: UK: Walker Books; US: Candlewick Press
- Publication date: 1994
- Publication place: United Kingdom
- Media type: Print
- Pages: 32
- Followed by: When I'm Big: A Guess How Much I Love You Storybook
- Website: Official website

Guess How Much I Love You is a British children's book written by Sam McBratney and illustrated by Anita Jeram, published in 1994, in the United Kingdom by Walker Books and in 1995, in the United States by its subsidiary Candlewick Press. The book was a 1996 ALA Notable Children's Book. In addition to the ALA award and numerous other awards, it has sold more than 43 million copies worldwide and been published in 57 languages.

Based on a 2007 online poll, the National Education Association in the U.S. listed the book as one of its "Teachers' Top 100 Books for Children". Guess How Much I Love You has been published in several different formats, suitable for children from age 1½ to 8. In 2011, the book was adapted as a television cartoon show in the U.S.

== Plot summary ==
Guess How Much I Love You follows the story of two hares, Big Nutbrown Hare and Little Nutbrown Hare. It does not state that they are father and son, but it is implied. Little Nutbrown Hare asks Big Nutbrown Hare the question, "Guess how much I love you?". The book continues as the two use larger and larger measures to quantify how much they love each other.

== Subsequent Nutbrown Hare books ==
In 2007, two additional Nutbrown Hare books were published: When I'm Big: A Guess How Much I Love You Storybook and Colors Everywhere: A Guess How Much I Love You Storybook, later released as a set. In 2008, Let's Play in the Snow: A Guess How Much I Love You Storybook was published. In 2009, A Surprise for the Nutbrown Hares: A Guess How Much I Love You Storybook was published. The Adventures of Little Nutbrown Hare, a 72-page, four-story compilation, was released in August 2012. It features the tales "The Hiding Tree", "On Cloudy Mountain", "The Far Field", and "Coming Home". Its illustrations were provided by Andy Wanger and Debbie Tarbett, "in the style of Anita Jeram".

== Animated TV series ==
In 2011, an animated adaptation of Guess How Much I Love You began airing through Canada's TVOKids and the United States' Disney Junior. The show is produced by SLR Productions Australia and Scrawl Studios and distributed by CCI Entertainment. Reception for the show has been positive, and in 2013 it received an AACTA Award nomination for "Best Children's Television Series".
