= Véronique Boiry =

French illustrator

Véronique Boiry is the pseudonym of Véronique Cau (born 1948), a French illustrator.

She was born in Toulon and studied at the École nationale supérieure des arts appliqués et des métiers d'art. Since 1972, she has been illustrating youth literature and magazines, especially those of Bayard Presse. She lives in Tournus.

She provided the illustrations for Je ne veux pas aller au tableau, text by Danielle Fossette, which received a Prix Sorcière in 1995.

== Selected work ==
Sources:

- Une nuit au grand magasin (2001)
- Le chat de l'empereur de Chine (2002)
- La Grenouille amoureuse (2003)
- Le Magicien se fâche (2003)
- Sur la piste du grand chef (2004)
