= Jean-Claude Mourlevat =

French writer (born 1952)

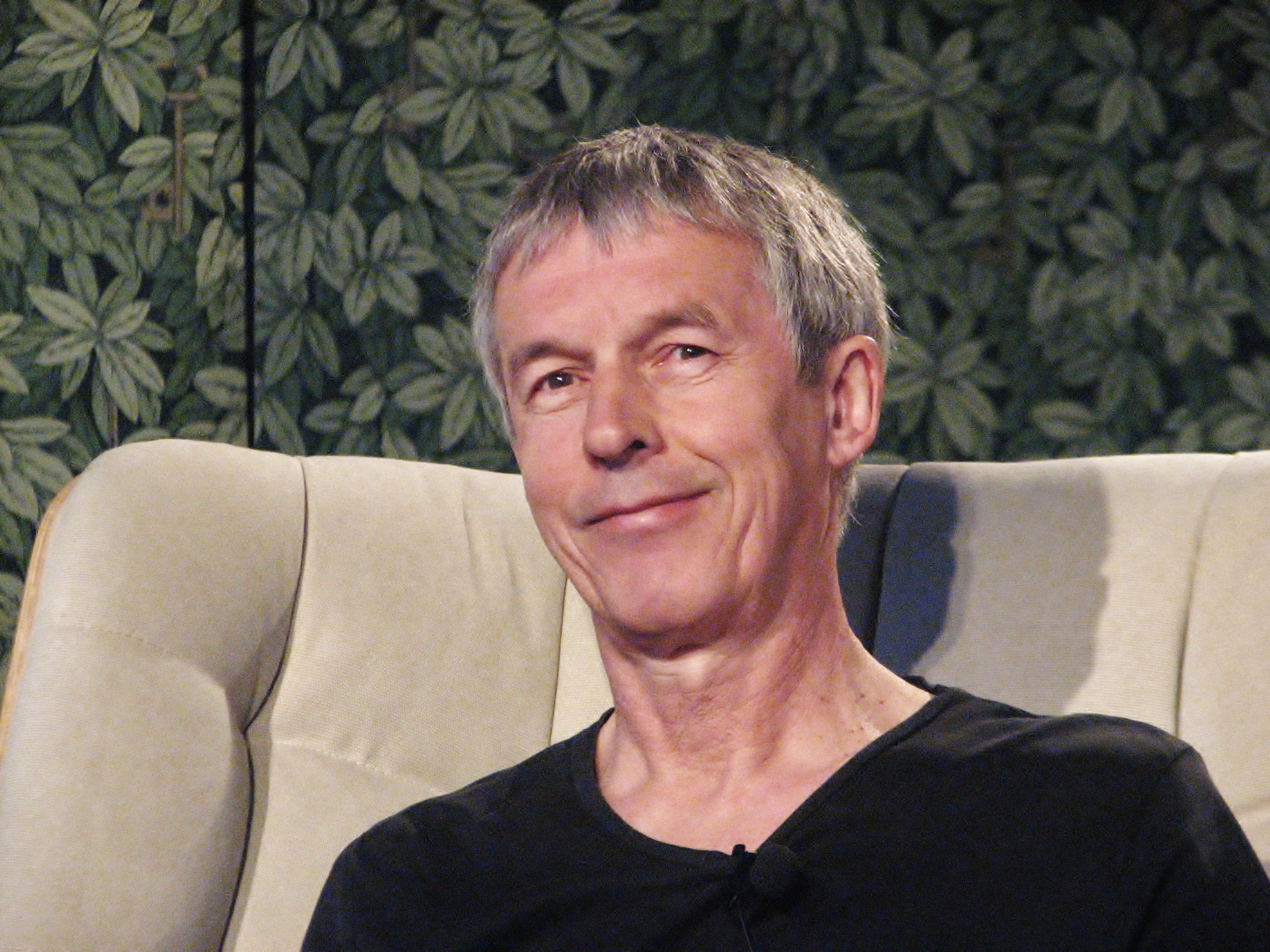
Jean-Claude Mourlevat

Jean-Claude Mourlevat (born March 22, 1952) is a French writer, known for his fairy-tale, fable, and fantasy-inspired novels intended for young people, for which he has won multiple awards, including the Astrid Lindgren Memorial Award. He also wrote a French novel named "La rivière a l'envers 1. Tomek" which also has a second version called "La rivière a l'envers 2. Hannah".

== Biography ==
Mourlevat was born March 22, 1952, in Ambert, the fifth of six children, and the son of a miller and homemaker. He spent his childhood in Auvergne, where he "helped tend the family farm, where they raised cows, pigs, rabbits, and hens."

Beginning in 1962, he attended the Blaise Pascal boarding school, where he "spent eight years at a boarding school...[;] the rules were harsh, the teachers strict and he felt constantly homesick and unhappy. He has said in interviews that literature became his salvation." He later evoked this part of his life in an autobiographical novel Je voudrais rentrer à la maison.

He continued his higher education in Strasbourg, Toulouse, Bonn, and Paris. He obtained a secondary degree in German, a language he taught from 1976 to 1985, first at a school in La Bourboule, then in Hamburg, and finally at a college in Cany-Barville, where he remained for 5 years.

Following his time in Cany-Barville, Mourlevat devoted himself to theatre. After spending time performing as a mime, clown, and actor, he moved on to directing plays before devoting himself to writing.

In 1997, Mourlevat published his first novel, Histoire de l'enfant et de l'œuf. He is the author of La Rivière à l'envers, L'Enfant Océan, La Balafre, Le Combat d'Hiver, and Le Chagrin du roi mort, among others. Several of Mourlevat's novels have won literary prizes from juries of young readers or adults, such as the Prix des Incorruptibles and the Prix Sorcières. Mourlevat's books have been translated into nearly thirty languages, including Braille.

In late 2019, Mourlevat attended a six-week "Room with a View" writing residency in San Francisco, funded by the Institut français.

Mourlevat presently lives near Saint-Étienne with his wife (Rachel) and their two children.

== Awards and honors ==
In 2021, Mourlevat won the Astrid Lindgren Memorial Award.

Awards for Mourlevat's writing
Year	Title	Award	Ref.
2000	L’Enfant océan	Prix Sorcières	
2002	La rivière à l’envers	Prix des incorruptibles	
2005	La balade de Cornebique	Prix Bernard Versele	
2006	Le Combat d’hiver	Prix jeunesse France Télévisions	
2007	Winter's End	Prix Saint-Exupéry for Prix Roman	
2007	The Pull of the Ocean	Mildred L. Batchelder Award	
2011	Terrienne	Prix Utopiales Europen Jeuness	
2013	Terrienne	Prix Ados Rennes Ille-et-Vilaine	
2019	Jefferson	Prix des libraires du Québec	

== Publications ==
=== Original publications ===
- Histoire de l’enfant et de l’oeuf, Illustrated by Fabienne Teyssèdre, Mango, 1997
- La Balafre, Pocket Junior, 1998
- A comme voleur, Pocket Jeunesse, 1998
- Le jeune loup qui n’avait pas de nom, Illustrated by Jean-Luc Bénazet, Milan, 1998
- Kolos et les quatre voleurs, Illustrated by Isabelle Chatellard, Flammarion, 1998
- L’Enfant océan, Pocket Jeunesse, 1999
- Le voyage de Zoé, Bordas, 1999
- Le petit royaume, Mango, 2000
- La rivière à l’envers: Tomek, Pocket Junior, 2000
- Regarde bien, Nathan, 2001
- La rivière à l’envers: Hannah, Pocket Junior, 2002
- La ballade de Cornebique, Gallimard Jeunesse, 2004
- Sous le grand banian, Rue du Monde, 2005
- Le combat d’hiver, Gallimard Jeunesse, 2006
- La prodigieuse aventure de Tillman Ostergrimm, illustrated by Marcelino Truong, Gallimard Jeunesse, 2007
- Les billes du diable, Bayard Poche, 2008
- Le chagrin du roi mort, Gallimard Jeunesse, 2009
- Terrienne, Gallimard Jeunesse, 2011
- Silhouette, Gallimard, 2013
- Sophie Sholl: Non á la lâcheté, Actes Sud Junior, 2013
- Aristide, Bordas, 2014
- Le garçon qui volait, illustrated by Marcelino Truong, Gallimard Jeunesse, 2015 (previously published under the title La troisième vengeance de Robert Poutiffard, 2003)
- L'homme qui levait les pierres, Thierry Magnier, 2015
- L'homme qui ne possédait rien, Thierry Magnier, 2015
- Jefferson, Illustrated by Antoine Ronzon, Gallimard Jeunesse, 2018

=== Translations ===
Mourlevat's books have been translated to over twenty languages, including Catalan, Chinese, English, Estonian, Georgian, German, Italian, Japanese, Korean, Lithuanian, Romanian, Russian, and Spanish. The following is an incomplete list of English translations.

- The Pull of the Ocean (Original title: L'enfant océan), Translated by Y. Maudet, Delacorte Press, 2006.
- Winter Song (Original title: Le combat d’hiver), Translated by Anthea Bell, Walker Books, 2008 (Also published as Winter’s End, Candlewick, 2009).
- Jefferson, Illustrated by Antoine Ronzon, Translated by Ros Schwartz, Andersen Press, 2020
