= Florence Seyvos =

French novelist, and screenwriter (born 1967)

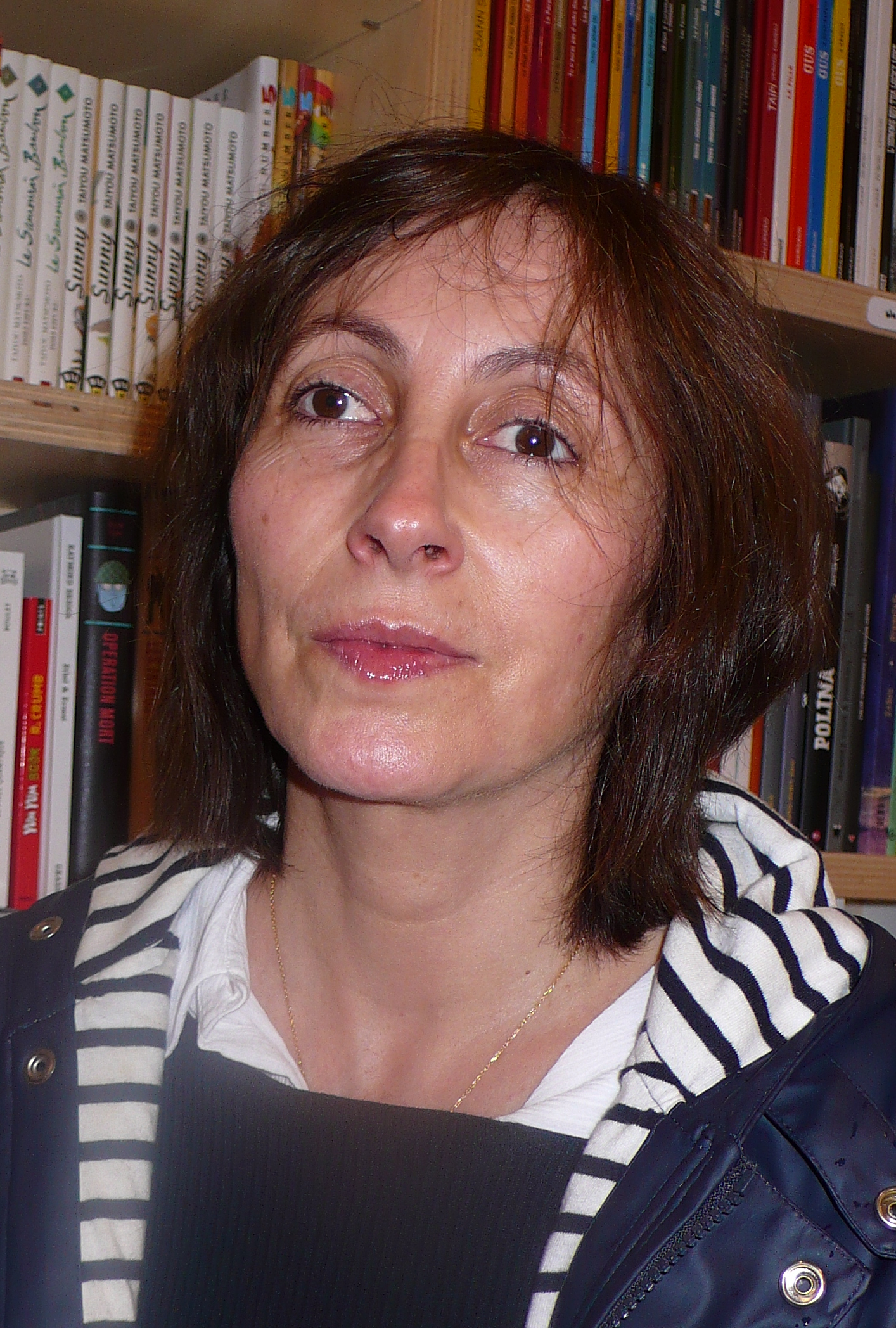
- Seyvos on 30 September 2016
- Born: 25 January 1967 (age 59); Lyon
- Occupations: Novelist, screenwriter

Florence Seyvos (born 1967) is a French novelist, and screenwriter. Her films have been successful in French and in English.

== Life ==
Seyvos was born in Lyon in 1967 and lived in northern France. Seyvos published her first book for children after winning first prize in a short story competition. She has also written novels including Les Apparitions which was awarded the Prix Goncourt (du premier roman) and Un Garçon Incassable.

Seyvos collaborates on many of her screenplays with Noémie Lvovsky, including Sentiments (no) and Camille Redouble.

She has lived in the Ardennes, in Ivory Coast, Le Havre and Paris.

== Awards ==
- 1987 Lauréate du PJE
- 1995 Prix Goncourt First Novel
- Prix France Télévision

== Works ==
- Gratia, Éditions de l'Olivier, 1992, ISBN 9782879290362
- Les Apparitions, Éditions de l'Olivier, 1995, ISBN 9782879290737
- L'Abandon, Éditions de l'Olivier, 2002, ISBN 9782879293530

=== Young adult ===
- Nanouk et moi, L'Ecole des Loisirs, 2010, ISBN 9782211098038
- L'Ami du Petit Tyrannosaure, l'École des loisirs, 2005, ISBN 9782211081757
- Pochee, l'École des loisirs, 1998, ISBN 9782211044387

== Filmography ==
- 1997 Les années lycée: Petites (TV)
- 1999 Life Doesn't Scare Me
- 2003 Feelings
- 2007 Faut que ça danse!
