= Claire Franek =

French children's writer and illustrator (1966–2016)

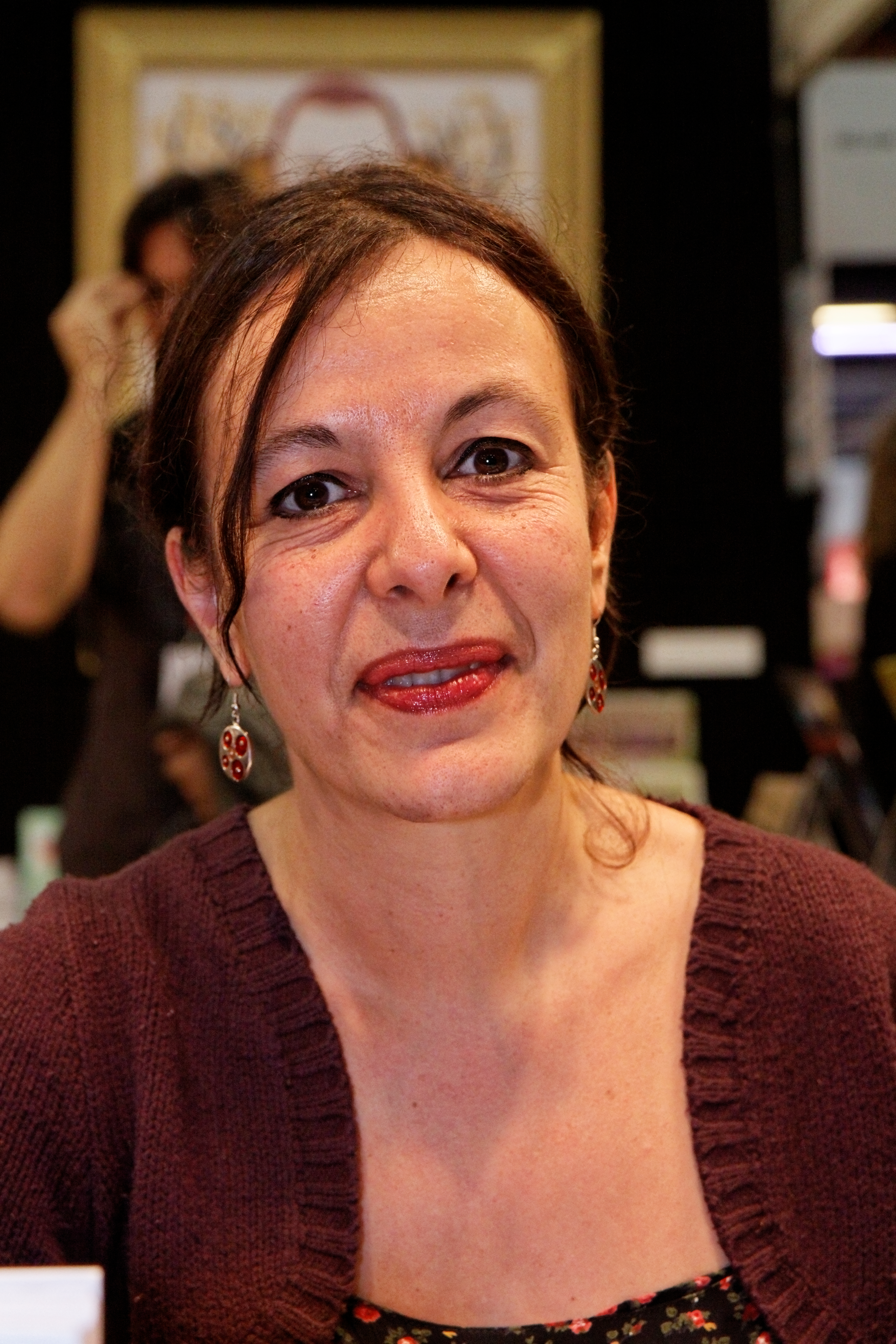
Claire Franek

Claire Franek (28 July 1966 – 9 March 2016) was a French writer and illustrator best known for her children's books.

She was born in Paris and studied plastic arts at the École des Arts Appliqués, scenography at the École nationale supérieure des arts décoratifs and puppetry at the École de marionnettes de Prague. In 1996, she published her first book Qui est au bout du fil ?.

Franek also created post cards, art cards and T-shirts, as well as painting backgrounds for the theatre.

Her book Tous à poil ! was the target of criticism by Jean-François Copé, at the time president of the Union for a Popular Movement, who was upset that the work was included in a list of books recommended for use by primary school teachers. The book had earlier received an award in Belgium for best French language book and the Prix Libbylit at the Salon du livre de la jeunesse de Namur. The book's creators stated that their intent was to provide an uninhibited look at nudity. The controversy helped generate new interest in the book.

Franek died at the age of 49 following a long illness.

== Selected works ==
- Le drame (2000)
- Rendez-vous à quatre heures et demie (2004)
- Non-Non et Grand Ours blond, comics (2005)
- Le facteur n'est pas passé (2007)
- O comme (2008)
- Tous à poil (2011), illustrated by Marc Daniau
- La fabrique à théatre (2011), illustrator, text by Ghislaine Beaudout
- Tout le monde à dos ! (2011), illustrator, text by Annie Agopian
- Grand Spectacle (2016), received the Prix Brindacier
