= Anita Jeram =

English author and illustrator (born 1965)

- Born: 1965 (age 60–61)
- Education: Manchester Polytechnic
- Occupations: Author; illustrator
- Writing career
- Genre: Children's literature

Anita Jeram (born 1965) is an English author and illustrator of picture books for children.

== Life and career ==
Growing up in Portsmouth, England, Jeram always enjoyed drawing, but worked a variety of jobs before pursuing a degree course in illustration at Manchester Polytechnic (now Manchester Metropolitan University). Soon after graduation she wrote her first book, Bill's Belly Button, which was published by Walker Books in 1991. Other books she has written include Contrary Mary (1995), Bunny, My Honey (1999), and I Love My Little Storybook (2002). As an illustrator, Jeram received recognition for her illustrations in Sam McBratney's Guess How Much I Love You (1994), which was a picture-book best seller as well as a 1996 ALA Notable Children's Book. She has also illustrated several books by Dick King-Smith and Amy Hest.

In addition to her work on picture books Jeram also publishes greeting cards through Two Bad Mice Publishers Ltd.

Jeram lives with her family in Northern Ireland.
