= Astrid Lindgren Memorial Award =

Literary award

The Astrid Lindgren Memorial Award (Swedish: Litteraturpriset till Astrid Lindgrens minne) is an international children's literary award established by the Swedish government in 2002 to honour the Swedish children's author Astrid Lindgren (1907–2002). The prize is five million SEK, making it the richest award in children's literature and one of the richest literary prizes in the world. The annual cost of 10 million SEK (in 2008) is financed with tax money.

The Lindgren Award annually recognises one or more living people and extant institutions (twelve in the first ten years) – people for their career contributions and institutions for their long-term sustainable work. Specifically they should be "authors, illustrators, oral storytellers and promoters of reading" whose "work is of the highest quality, and in the spirit of Astrid Lindgren." The object of the award is to increase interest in children's and young people's literature, and to promote children's rights to culture on a global level.

The award is administered by the Swedish Arts Council funded solely by the central government. Officially it is called "An award by the Swedish people to the world". The award ceremony is presided over by Crown Princess Victoria of Sweden.

"The award recipients are chosen by a jury with broad expertise in international children's and young adult literature, reading promotion and children's rights. The 12 members include authors, literary critics and scholars, illustrators and librarians. One member represents Astrid Lindgren's family."

The annual cycle begins no later than December about 9 months before nominees are announced, 15 months before the winner is announced and 18 months before the presentation.

== Winners ==
In the first 23 annual cycles through 2025 there were 25 recipients, twenty-one people and four institutions. There were two inaugural awards in 2003 and two again in 2005.

Astrid Lindgren Memorial Award winners
Year	Author	Country	Ref.
2003	Christine Nöstlinger	Austria	
2003	Maurice Sendak	United States	
2004	Lygia Bojunga Nunes	Brazil	
2005	Ryōji Arai	Japan	
2005	Philip Pullman	United Kingdom	
2006	Katherine Paterson	United States	
2007	Banco del Libro	Venezuela	
2008	Sonya Hartnett	Australia	
2009	Tamer Institute for Community Education	Palestine	
2010	Kitty Crowther	Belgium	
2011	Shaun Tan	Australia	
2012	Guus Kuijer	Netherlands	
2013	Isol	Argentina	
2014	Barbro Lindgren	Sweden	
2015	Project for the Study of Alternative Education in South Africa (PRAESA)	South Africa	
2016	Meg Rosoff	United States/United Kingdom	
2017	Wolf Erlbruch	Germany	
2018	Jacqueline Woodson	United States	
2019	Bart Moeyaert	Belgium	
2020	Baek Hee-na	South Korea	
2021	Jean-Claude Mourlevat	France	
2022	Eva Lindström	Sweden	
2023	Laurie Halse Anderson	United States	
2024	Indigenous Literacy Foundation	Australia	
2025	Marion Brunet	France	
2026	Jon Klassen	Canada	

Five of the Lindgren Award winners have also, and much earlier, won the older, international Hans Christian Andersen Award for their lifetime contributions to children's literature: Sendak and Erlbruch as illustrators; Nöstlinger, Nunes, and Paterson as authors. Lindgren herself won the Andersen Award in 1958. In 2020, Woodson also won the Andersen Award as an author, two years after winning the Lindgren Award.

== See also ==
- List of literary awards
