= Close to Home =

Close to Home may refer to:

== Film and television ==
- Close to Home (film), a 2005 Israeli movie
- Close to Home (2001 film), an American TV movie starring Gabrielle Union
- Close to Home (1975 TV series), a New Zealand soap opera
- Close to Home (1989 TV series), a UK sitcom
- Close to Home (2005 TV series), an American crime drama

Television episodes

- "Close to Home" (All Saints)
- "Close to Home" (The Bill)
- "Close to Home" (Canada's Worst Driver)
- "Close to Home" (Casualty)
- "Close to Home" (The Cosby Show)
- "Close to Home" (Under Cover)
- "Close to Home" (Wildfire)
- "Close to Home" (Wycliffe)

== Music ==
- Close to Home (Beverley Craven album), an album by Beverley Craven
- Close to Home (band), an American post-hardcore band
- "Close to Home", a 1999 song by The Get Up Kids from their album Something to Write Home About
- "Close to Home", a 2002 song by Blue Six from their album Beautiful Tomorrow
- Close to Home (Aitch album), 2022

== Books ==
- Close to Home (Magee novel), a 2023 novel by Michael Magee
- Close to Home (Moggach novel) a 1979 novel by Deborah Moggach
- Close to Home (Robinson novel) a 2003 novel by Peter Robinson
- Close to Home: A Materialist Analysis of Women's Oppression, a 1984 book by Christine Delphy
- Close to home (Hunter novel), a 2020 novel by Cara Hunter

== Other media ==
- Close to Home (comic strip), a syndicated comic strip by John McPherson

== See also ==
- Closer to Home, an album by Grand Funk Railroad
  - "I'm Your Captain (Closer to Home)", the title song
- So Close to Home, an album by The Gathering Field
- Too Close to Home, a novel by Linwood Barclay
