= Seesaw (disambiguation) =

Seesaw typically refers to a playground piece of equipment.

Seesaw or See-Saw may also refer to:

== Arts ==
=== Music ===
- Seesaw (album), 2013 album by Beth Hart and Joe Bonamassa
- See-Saw (group), a Japanese pop group
- See-Saw, a 1919 Broadway musical with music by Louis Hirsch
- Seesaw (musical), a 1973 Broadway musical
- "See Saw" (Don Covay song), a 1965 song by Don Covay, covered by Aretha Franklin in 1968
- "See-Saw" (song), a 1968 song by Pink Floyd
- "See Saw", a 2018 song by Loona from Go Won
- "Seesaw", a 2025 song by Twice from This Is For

=== Television and film ===
- SeeSaw (Internet television), a former Internet television venture by Arqiva
- See-Saw (TV programme), a strand of programmes shown in the UK during the 1980s
- "See-Saw", a 1997 episode of the series Teletubbies
- Seesaw (Bluey), an episode of the animated series Bluey
- See-Saw Films, a British-Australian film and television production company
- Seesaw (TV series), an adaptation of the Moggach novel
- Seesaw (film), a 2025 Indian Tamil-language crime thriller film

=== Other media ===
- Seesaw (Moggach novel) a 1996 novel by Deborah Moggach (also its 1998 television adaptation)
- Seesaw (Ogene novel), a 2021 novel by Timothy Ogene
- See saw, an uncommon contra dance move, similar to a dosido

== Science ==
- Seesaw mechanism, a theoretical mechanism in particle physics
- Seesaw molecular geometry in chemistry
- Seesaw theorem in mathematics

== Other ==
- Seesaw (chess), a tactic in chess

== See also ==
- "Ride My See-Saw", a song from The Moody Blues' 1968 album In Search of the Lost Chord
- "See Saw Margery Daw", a nursery rhyme
