= Something to Hide =

Something to Hide may refer to:

- Something to Hide (film), a 1972 British thriller film
- Something to Hide (novel), a 2015 novel by Deborah Moggach
- "Something to Hide", a song by Grandson, from the album I Love You, I'm Trying
- "Something to Hide", a song by Of Mice & Men, from the album Restoring Force
- "Something to Hide", a song by The Streets, from the album The Darker the Shadow the Brighter the Light
