= Call Me Elizabeth =

Book by Dawn Annandale

Call Me Elizabeth: Wife, Mother, Escort
- First edition
- Author: Dawn Annandale
- Language: English
- Subject: Prostitution
- Publisher: Sphere
- Publication date: 2005
- Publication place: England
- Pages: 304
- ISBN: 978-0-7515-3698-0

Call Me Elizabeth: Wife, Mother, Escort is an autobiographical book by Dawn Annandale which chronicles how she turned to prostitution in order to support her family. The story provides a first-person account of a mother's struggle to provide a good life for her children and husband in 1980s Britain. It was published in 2005.

== Summary ==
When full-time legal secretary Dawn Annandale notices an advertisement in a magazine which states that attractive girls can earn up to £300 per night by engaging in escort work, her curiosity is piqued. At first, she thinks that the work would be in dissonance to her own life which consists of having six children between the ages of two and twelve, having a nice home in Kent and a husband, Paul. The struggle to maintain a privileged middle class existence led to Dawn's realisation that herself and her husband 'were very probably guilty of trying to live a champagne lifestyle on an orange juice budget.' The author's account of her subsequent actions attempt to explain to the reader that she was motivated by her fervent desire to give to her children a happy and stable beginning in life.

From the start of Dawn's marriage, Paul leaves the running of the house and the sorting of finances to Dawn. He assures Dawn that he is happy for her to do what she thinks is best for the family. When she enrols her first child at a private primary school, she feels that this sets a precedent for her other children to be educated up to the same standards. Financial matters are further complicated by the additional costs of after-school clubs, school uniforms and music lessons.

Her impecunious situation prompts her to make an appointment with Jimmy, a man in charge of the escort operation. Jimmy comments that Dawn is very different from his other girls. This adds to Dawn's anxiety because she worries that she will not experience financial success. When Jimmy asks her the reasons as to why she is seeking to pursue this form of work, Dawn replies honestly that she is motivated by the fact that she has 'six kids to feed and educate and a mountain of debts to pay.'

When Dawn sees her first client, she introduces herself as Elizabeth. Although she is overwhelmed by trepidation, uncertainty and anxiety during her experience, her fears soon dissipate when she visits subsequent clients. Many of the men she sees are exceptionally protective of her in that they give Dawn/ Elizabeth advice on the best means by which to conduct herself so that she can decrease the chances of finding herself in a dangerous situation. She is also struck by how many of her clients are lonely men who feel ignored by their wives. Many of her clients request her on multiple occasions because of her ability to engage in intellectual conversations.

When it dawns upon the author how lucrative her newfound position is, she leaves her job as a legal secretary and works as a full-time escort. She joins a new agency and becomes acquainted with Trish, who runs the switchboard. Elizabeth becomes more adept in her role and her confidence increases. When she rings a local radio station which asks listeners to provide an account of what they are doing late at night, Elizabeth reveals the activities in which she has been engaged. She is happy and pleased at the amount of public support she receives.

Her comfort level becomes challenged when one of her male friends discovers the double life that she has been leading.

== Call Me Elizabeth TV production ==
In 2005, ITV brought the television rights to the book. Deborah Moggach was to write the TV adaption.

== Sequel ==
Call Me Elizabeth was followed in 2007 with Call Me Madam, an account of the author setting up an escort agency.
