= Flour Babies =

1992 young adult novel by Anne Fine

- First edition
- Author: Anne Fine
- Language: English
- Genre: Children's novel
- Publisher: Hamish Hamilton
- Publication date: 19 November 1992
- Publication place: United Kingdom
- Media type: Print (hardcover)
- Pages: 155 pp (first edition)
- ISBN: 0-241-13252-5
- OCLC: 27149572
- LC Class: PZ7.F495673 Fl 1994

Flour Babies is a day school novel for young adults, written by Anne Fine and published by Hamilton in 1992. It features a group "science experiment" in a classroom full of underachieving students - according to the publisher's description:

When his class of underachievers is assigned to spend three torturous weeks taking care of their own "babies" in the form of bags of flour, Simon makes amazing discoveries about himself while coming to terms with his long-absent father.

Fine won two major British children's book awards for Flour Babies, the 1992 Carnegie Medal and the 1993 Whitbread Award for Children's Book, as well as receiving two American honours.

Little, Brown published the first U.S. edition in 1994. The teachers were renamed and the students were moved from "Class 4C" to "Room 8" for the American audience. Some libraries report the title Flour Babies and the Boys of Room 8.

== Synopsis ==
The story centres on Simon Martin, a pupil in class 4C at an unnamed school. 4C is the class reserved for the school's worst students. The school science fair is coming up, and the boys are choosing their contribution. The available topics are regarded by the boys as boring and "girls' stuff". They wish they could work on one of the more exciting experiments – Exploding Custard Tins, Soap Factory, or Maggot Farm, for example – but these have been reserved for those who passed their science exams. They end up with "Child Development".

The experiment that Dr Feltham (an eccentric science teacher who organizes the fair) has chosen for child development is 'Flour Babies'. Each boy is given a six-pound bag of flour, in rags to form the look of a baby, and he must care for it at all times as if it were a real baby. They must also write a diary explaining how they cope with this responsibility. Needless to say, the boys are not happy with this experiment, and neither is their teacher. But Simon misunderstands a conversation he overhears between Dr Feltham and Mr Cartright. Mr Cartright decides to pick another topic, but Simon has already mistakenly informed the class that they will get to kick the babies to bits at the end of the experiment; they like the idea and press-gang the teacher into letting them do the experiment.

Simon becomes fond of his flour baby, while the others complain. Simon reflects on his own childhood: his Dad left home when Simon was just six weeks old, and never came back. His relationship with his mother has always been precarious, and Simon now begins to learn about the pressures of parenthood. Through the experiment, he comes to value his mother's care and understand his father's desertion.

== Awards ==
Fine won the annual Carnegie Medal from the Library Association, recognising the year's best children's book by a British subject. She is one of eight writers with two such honours (no one has won three), having won the 1986 Medal for Goggle-Eyes. The earlier book also uses a day school frame to recount a story of family life.

In addition, Flour Babies was chosen for the 1993 Whitbread Award for Children's Book, an award that considered enjoyment and popular appeal as well as literary merit.

After the novel was published in America, it was named as Boston Globe/Horn Book Award Honor Book for 1994. It was also listed as an American Library Association Notable Children's Book.

Flour Babies was one of the books included in the 1001 Children's Books You Must Read Before You Grow Up by Julia Eccleshare.

== Reception ==
Kirkus recommends the novel as a "tender, funny study in child development—but the child is Simon, not the flour 'daughter'". The review notes that the physical comedy in the book is prevented from descending into slapstick by the ably-drawn cast.

Julia Eccleshare, in a review of the audio edition for Books for Keeps, described the novel as "flawlessly structured" so that the story can "unfold elegantly and thoughtfully".

A "classic story which is funny, touching and insightful" is the verdict of the BookTrust recommendation.

The literacy charity Bringing Words to Life includes Flour Babies among its Best Books for ages 10–14. The reviewer observes that the novel is "profound enough for an adult reader" and that "Not many books about teenage boys could be described as sweet, but this is definitely one that fits the bill."

A lengthy review by Karen Argent for the Letterpress Project reflects on the development of Simon through his engagement with the experiment and gives some quotations from Anne Fine on her approach to writing for young people. Argent expresses the opinion that Fine's skill lies in "telling eventful, authentic stories that are multi-layered and often very funny".

Awards
Preceded by Dear Nobody	Carnegie Medal recipient 1992	Succeeded by Stone Cold
