= Porky (novel) =

1983 novel by Deborah Moggach

- First edition
- Author: Deborah Moggach
- Cover artist: Sue Wilks
- Language: English
- Publisher: Jonathan Cape
- Publication date: 12 May 1983
- Publication place: United Kingdom
- Media type: Print & ebook
- Pages: 236
- ISBN: 0-224-02948-7

Porky, is the fifth novel by the English author Deborah Moggach, first published in 1983 by Jonathan Cape and recommended in OUP's Good Fiction Guide.

== Plot introduction ==
"Porky" is Heather's nickname because her father keeps pigs in a field at their ramshackle bungalow just off the A4 near Heathrow Airport. Heather is eleven when her mother has an extended stay in hospital over the birth of her second child, leaving Heather alone with her father at home. He begins to abuse her sexually.

Heather is already a troubled child, bullied at school with few friends. As the abuse continues, she becomes more troubled and takes to thieving and promiscuity.

== Reception ==
- An "extraordinarily skilful account of a childhood blasted by what is now acknowledged to be a more widespread offence than was previously recognised: incest", Anita Brookner, London Review of Books.
- "Deborah Moggach conveys with chilling skill the process by which a fundamentally bright, decent child becomes infested by corruption.", The Spectator
- Gay Firth writing in The Times warns "readers of despairing disposition or dainty susceptibilities will pass by on the other side, shuddering" but goes on to praise the author for "sustaining a first-person register so level in its tone of quiet desperation, so careful to avoid blatant shock, as to hold back the tidal wave of revulsion and pity which threatens, but never quite engulfs the reader".
