= The Carer =

The Carer may refer to:

- The Carer (film), a 2016 British-Hungarian comedy film
- The Carer (novel), a 2019 novel by Deborah Moggach
