= Ivan the Terrible (novel) =

2007 children's book by Anne Fine

- First edition
- Author: Anne Fine
- Illustrator: Philippe Dupasquier
- Language: English
- Genre: Children's
- Publisher: Egmont
- Publication date: 4 June 2007
- Publication place: United Kingdom
- Pages: 128 pp
- ISBN: 978-1-4052-3324-8
- OCLC: 85898151

Ivan the Terrible is a 2007 children's novel by Anne Fine. It won the Nestlé Children's Book Prize Silver Award.

== Plot ==
It is Ivan's first day of school. He can only speak Russian and it's Boris's job to look after him and translate for him. St Edmund's is a civilized school, but Ivan isn't civilized. Boris knows that he is going to have trouble teaching Ivan.

== Reception ==
Chris Stephenson, of Carousel, reviewed the book saying "To work successfully, the book required a delicate balancing-act and Anne Fine, a consummate high-wire performer, doesn't put a foot wrong." Vanessa Curtis, of The Herald, reviewed the book saying ""Fine's writing is comic, her characters are well-drawn and there is a neat twist at the end..." Nicolette Jones, of Sunday Times, reviewed the book saying "...delightfully spiky... ...irreverent comedy..."
