= Richard Hough =

British author and historian (1922–1999)

Richard Alexander Hough (/haʊ/; 15 May 1922 – 7 October 1999) was a British author and historian specializing in maritime history.

== Life ==
After leaving school, he joined the Royal Air Force at the beginning of World War II and received his initial flight training at an airfield not far from Hollywood. He later flew Hurricanes and Typhoons.

Hough married the author Charlotte Woodyatt, whom he had met when they were pupils at Frensham Heights School, and they had five children, including the author Deborah Moggach, the children's author Sarah Garland, Alexandra Hough, author of the textbook Hough’s Cardio Respiratory Care and Bryony Driver, artist and blacksmith.

== Literary career ==
Hough won the Daily Express Best Book of the Sea Award in 1972. He wrote around 90 books in total, including books for children and young adults under the nom de plume Bruce Carter.

== Bibliography as Richard Hough ==
- Six Great Railwaymen (1955) (about George Stephenson, George Hudson, Edmund Denison, Mark Huish, George Stephen and Nigel Gresley)
- Tourist Trophy: The History of Britain's Greatest Motor Race (1957)
- The Fleet That Had to Die (1958) (about Zinovy Rozhestvensky's mission)
- British Grand Prix: A History (1958)
- Admirals in Collision (1959) (about the Sinking of HMS Victoria)
- The Potemkin Mutiny (1960)
- Book of the Racing Campbells (1960) (about Malcolm Campbell and Donald Campbell)
- A History of the World's Sports Cars (1961)
- A History of the World's Classic Cars (with co-author Michael Frostick, 1963)
- First and Fastest: A Collection of the World's Greatest Motor Races (editor, 1963)
- The Hunting of Force Z (1963)
- The Fighter (1963) (novel)
- Motor Car Lover's Companion (editor, 1965)
- Dreadnought: A History of the Modern Battleship (1965)
- The Big Battleship or the Curious Career of HMS Agincourt (1966)
- Racing Cars (1966)
- Rover Memories (with co-author Michael Frostick, 1966)
- A History of the World's High-Performance Cars (with co-author Michael Frostick, 1967)
- Fighting Ships (1969)
- The Pursuit of Admiral von Spee: A Study in Lonliness and Bravery (1969)
- First Sea Lord: An Authorized Biography of Admiral Lord Fisher (1969)
- The Battle of Midway: Victory in the Pacific (1970)
- A History of the World's Motorcycles (with co-author L. J. K. Setright, 1971; revised ed. 1973)
- The Blind Horn's Hate: Cape Horn and the Uttermost South (1971)
- Captain Bligh & Mr. Christian: The Men and the Mutiny (1972)
- Louis and Victoria: The First Mountbattens (1974)
- Advice to a Grand-daughter: Letters from Queen Victoria to Princess Victoria of Hesse (editor, 1975)
- One Boy's War (1975); also Pen & Sword, 2008 ISBN 978-1-84415-690-0 (WW2 autobiography)
- Galapagos: The Enchanted Islands (1975)
- The Great Admirals (1977) ISBN 0-688-03183-8
- Angels One-five (1978) aka Wings Against the Sky (novel)
- The Murder of Captain James Cook (1979)
- The Fight of the Few (1979) aka The Raging Sky (novel)
- The Fight to the Finish (1979) aka Wings of Victory (novel)
- Man o War: The Fighting Ship in History (1979)
- Mountbatten: Hero of Our Time (1980)
- Nelson: A Biography (1980)
- Buller's Guns (1981) (novel)
- Buller's Dreadnought (1982) (novel)
- The Great War at Sea: 1914-1918 (1983) ISBN 0-19-215871-6
- Edwina: Countess Mountbatten of Burma (1983)
- Buller's Victory (1984) (novel)
- Former Naval Person: Churchill and the Wars at Sea (1985)
  - US edition: The Greatest Crusade: Roosevelt, Churchill and the Naval Wars (1986)
- The Ace of Clubs: A History of the Garrick (1986)
- The Longest Battle: The War at Sea 1939-1945 (1986)
- Born Royal: The Lives and Loves of the Young Windsors (1988)
- The Battle of Britain: The Jubilee History (with co-author Denis Richards, 1989)
- Winston & Clementine: The Triumph of the Churchills (1990)
- Bless Our Ship: Mountbatten and the Kelly (1991)
- Other Days Around Me: A Memoir (1992) (autobiography)
- Edward and Alexandra: Their Private and Public Lives (1992) ISBN 0-340-55825-3
- Captain James Cook: A Biography (1994) ISBN 0-340-82556-1
- Victoria and Albert: Their Love and Their Tragedies (1996)
- Sister Agnes: The History of King Edward VII's Hospital for Officers 1899–1999 (1998) ISBN 0-7195-5561-2
- Naval Battles of the Twentieth Century (1999) ISBN 0-094-79910-5

== Bibliography as Bruce Carter ==
- Into a Strange Lost World (1952) aka The Perilous Descent into a Strange Lost World (Children's)
- Speed Six! (1953) (Children's)
- Peril on the Iron Road (1953) (Children's)
- Motor Racing: A Guide for the Younger Enthusiast (with co-author Michael Frostick, 1955)
- Target Island (1956) (Children's)
- Tim Baker: Motor Mechanic (1957)
- The Kidnapping of Kensington (1958) aka The Children Who Stayed Behind (Children's)
- Four Wheel Drift (1959) (Children's)
- Great Motor Races (editor, 1960)
- The Motorway Chase (1961) (Children's)
- The Playground (1964) (Children's)
- The Airfield Man (1965) (Children's)
- The Gannet's Nest (1966) (Children's)
- Jimmy Murphy and the White Duesenberg (illustrated by Raymond Briggs, 1968) (Children's)
- Nuvolari and the Alfa Romeo (illustrated by Raymond Briggs, 1968) (Children's)
- B Flight (1972) (Children's)
- Upley United (1972) (Children's)
- Ballooning Boy (1974) (Children's)
- The Deadly Freeze (1976) (Children's)
- Buzzbugs (1977) (Children's)
- Miaow (1978) (Children's)
- Razor Eyes (1981) (Children's)
