= Dupasquier =

Dupasquier is a surname. Notable people with the surname include:

- Ivan Dupasquier (born 1961), Swiss tennis player
- Jason Dupasquier (2001–2021), Swiss motorcycle rider
- Pierre Dupasquier (born 1937), French engineer
- Philippe Dupasquier (born 1955), author and illustrator
