= Step by Wicked Step =

1995 novel by Anne Fine

- First edition
- Author: Anne Fine
- Language: English
- Genre: Children's novel
- Publisher: Hamish Hamilton
- Publication date: 26 Jan 1995
- Publication place: United Kingdom
- Media type: Print
- Pages: 135 pp
- ISBN: 9780241001615
- OCLC: 859022982

Step By Wicked Step is a children's novel by Anne Fine, first published in 1995. In the novel five unrelated children talk about their difficulties with their parents' being separated and with their stepfamilies. The title makes reference to the fictional tradition of the wicked stepmother.

== Plot summary ==
Five children on a school trip stay overnight in Old Harwick Hall, a reputedly haunted house. They find the dusty diary of a boy called Richard Clayton Harwick and read that after Richard ran away to sea to escape his stepfather, he returned to an empty house. His mother had died of grief while his sister had also died in childbirth. This sparks a discussion of Richard's actions between the children. The discussion leads to each of them divulging their own family problems.

Claudia reveals that her parents had divorced after several fights. The 'scarlet woman', a pleasant woman named Stella, tries but fails to win Claudia's approval. However, after a dinner party with her father's friends who also ignore Stella, Claudia attempts to get attention by wearing beautiful green pyjamas bought by Stella in front of the guests, shocking them into politeness.

Colin reveals that his 'Dad' (who was his mother's partner but not his biological father) was left behind by his mother after they had absconded one day. While his mother was frustrated with Jack (Dad)'s unemployed state, Colin, who loved him very much, attempted to keep in contact with Jack. Failing to do so, he plans to find him in the future.

Pixie recounts her parents' separation and her father's second marriage. She dislikes both her stepsisters. In a quarrel with her stepmother Lucy, Pixie unburdened herself of her grievances. Lucy aired her frustrations as well, and they made up.

Ralph entertains the children with a comical description of his extended step-family, spanning two previous stepmothers and their children, one stepfather and one future stepmother, whom he is infatuated with.

Robbo's story is about his stepfather, The Beard, and his sister Callie, who cannot get along. This had caused much trouble for the family especially after the birth of stepbrother Dumpa. Callie finally moved in with her father instead.

Before going to bed, the other children secretly place a broken wooden cow made by Richard Harwick into Colin's bag, as a reminder to him to make the best of what he faces.
