= Philippe Dupasquier =

Author and illustrator of children's books

- Born: September 27, 1955 (age 69); Neuchâtel, Switzerland
- Occupation: Author and illustrator of children's books
- Notable works: Bill's New Frock (1989)
- Notable awards: Smarties Book Prize (1989)
- Spouse: Sylvie Grandin
- Children: 2

Philippe Dupasquier (born September 27, 1955, in Neuchâtel, Switzerland) is an author and illustrator of children's books. Bill's New Frock, which he illustrated, won the 1989 Smarties Book Prize for Ages 6-8 and was commended for the Carnegie Medal.

== Biography ==
Dupasquier was born September 27, 1955, in Neuchâtel, Switzerland to Fernand and Christiane Dupasquier. He attended art school in Lyon, France from 1976–79, after which he became a freelance illustrator in London, England.

The detailed crowd-scenes of Dupasquier's "Busy Places" series were an inspiration for the creation of Martin Handford's popular Where's Wally? series.

Dupasquier married Sylvie Grandin on June 16, 1979, and the couple has two children: Timothy and Sophie.

== Awards ==
Anne Fine's Bill's New Frock, which Dupasquier illustrated, won the 1989 Smarties Book Prize for Ages 6-8 and was commended for the 1989 Carnegie Medal from the British Library Association. The following year, it received the Oak Tree Award from Nottinghamshire Libraries.

== Publications ==
=== As author ===
- Dear Daddy, Bradbury, 1985
- Robert and the Red Balloon, Walker Books, 1985
- Robert the Great, Walker Books, 1985
- Robert the Pilot, Walker Books, 1986
- Jack at Sea, Andersen, 1986
- Our House on the Hill, Andersen, 1987, Viking Press, 1990
- The Great Escape, Houghton,1988, revised edition, Candlewick Press, 1996
- I Can't Sleep, Walker Books, 1989, Orchard Books, 1990
- A Robot Named Chip, Andersen, 1990, Viking Press, 1991
- My Dad, Andersen, 1991
- Paul's Present, Andersen, 1992
- Follow That Chimp, Walker Books, 1993
- Tom's Pirate Ship, Andersen, 1993
  - Republished as Andy's Pirate Ship, Holt, 1994
- No More Television, Andersen, 1995
- My Busy Day, Anderson, 1996, HarperCollins, 1997
- A Sunday with Grandpa, Andersen, 1998
- Quack, Quack!, Andersen, 2001
- One, Two, Three, Follow Me!, Candlewick Press, 2002
- Red, Blue, Color Zoo, Candlewick Press, 2002

==== "Busy Places" series ====
- The Airport, Grosset & Dunlap, 1984
  - Republished as A Busy Day at the Airport, Walker Books, 1994.
- The Building Site, Grosset & Dunlap, 1984
  - Republished as A Busy Day at the Building Site, Walker Books, 1994.
- The Factory, Grosset & Dunlap, 1984
  - Republished as A Busy Day at the Factory, Walker Books, 1994, Candlewick Press, 1996.
- The Service Station, Grosset & Dunlap, 1984
  - Republished as The Garage, Walker Books, 1984
  - Republished as A Busy Day at the Garage, Walker Books, 1994.
- The Train Station, Grosset & Dunlap, 1984
  - Republished as The Railway Station, Walker Books, 1984
  - Republished as A Busy Day at the Railway Station, Walker Books, 1994
  - Republished as A Busy Day at the Train Station, Candlewick Press, 1996.
- The Harbor, Grosset & Dunlap, 1984
  - Republished as The Harbour, Walker Books, 1984
  - Republished as A Busy Day at the Harbour, Walker Books, 1994
  - Republished as A Busy Day at the Harbor, Candlewick Press, 1996.

=== As illustrator ===
- The Great Green Mouse Disaster by Martin Waddell, Andersen, 1981
- The Great Ice-Cream Crime by Hazel Townson, Andersen, 1981
- The Siege of Cobb Street by Hazel Townson, Andersen, 1981
- The Incompetent Dragon by Janice Elliott, Blackie, 1982
- Going West by Martin Waddell, Harper, 1983
- The Vanishing Gran by Hazel Townson, Andersen, 1983
- Haunted Ivy by Hazel Townson, Andersen, 1984
- Old Farm, New Farm by Felicia Law, G. Stevens, 1986
- Fireworks Galore! by Hazel Townson, Andersen, 1988
- Follow That Pharaoh by Derek Sampson, Methuen, 1988
- Bill's New Frock by Anne Fine, Methuen, 1989
- The Country Pancake by Anne Fine, Methuen, 1989
- Who's Afraid of Swapping Spiders? by Mary Welfare, Methuen, 1989
- Digger by Angela Royston, Kingfisher, 1990
- Helicopter by Angela Royston, Kingfisher, 1990
- Stanley in Space by Jeff Brown, Methuen, 1990
- Whizzkid by Tessa Krailing, Paperbird, 1990
- Design a Pram by Anne Fine, Heinemann, 1991
- Gobbo the Great by Gillian Cross, Methuen, 1991
- Charlie the Champion Liar by Hazel Townson, Methuen, 1993
- Fizzy Hits the Headlines by Michael Coleman, Orchard Books, 1993
- Keep on Chomping! by Nigel Gray, Andersen, 1993
- Stanley's Christmas Adventure by Jeff Brown, Methuen, 1993
- The Busy Digger by Angela Royston, Kingfisher, 1993
- Fizzy Steals the Show by Michael Coleman, Orchard Books, 1994
- Henry Seamouse by Sam McBratney, Longman, 1994
- The Peckthorn Monster by Hazel Townson, Methuen, 1994
- Twin Trouble by Jacqueline Wilson, Methuen, 1994
- Charlie the Champion Traveller by Hazel Townson, Methuen, 1995
- Danger Zoom by Hazel Townson, Ginn, 1995
- Downhill Zoom by Hazel Townson, Ginn, 1995
- Fizzy by Michael Coleman, T.V. Star, 1995
- Football Zoom by Hazel Townson, Ginn, 1995
- Meet Ziggy by Hazel Townson, Ginn, 1995
- Party Zoom by Hazel Townson, Ginn, 1995
- Pop-Star Zoom by Hazel Townson, Ginn, 1995
- Robber Zoom by Hazel Townson, Ginn, 1995
- Skateboard Zoom by Hazel Townson, Ginn, 1995
- How to Write Really Badly by Anne Fine, Methuen, 1996
- Are We Nearly There Yet? by Richard Kidd, Bloomsbury Publishing, 1997
- Charlie's Champion Chase by Hazel Townson, Mammoth, 1997
- Fizzy in the Spotlight by Michael Coleman, Orchard Books, 1997
- Sophie's Nu-Pet by Chris Powling, Ragged Bears, 1998
- Lift Off by Hazel Townson, Barrington Stoke, 1999
- High Five Henry by Alan MacDonald, Oxford University Press, 2002
- Bombs and Blackberries: A World War II Play by Julia Donaldson, Hodder Wayland, 2003
- Brick-A-Breck by Julia Donaldson, A&C Black, 2003
- A Country Far Away by Nigel Gray, Andersen, 1988, Orchard, 1989
- The Sandal by Tony Bradman, Andersen, 1989, Viking, 1990
- The Chicken Gave It to Me by Anne Fine, Methuen, 1992

==== "Lenny and Jake Adventure" series ====
The "Lenny and Jake Adventure" books are written by Hazel Townson and published by Andersen in London, England.

- The Crimson Crescent, 1986.
- The Staggering Snowman, 1987.
- Walnut Whirl, 1989.
- Hopping Mad, 1991.
- The Kidnap Report, 1992.
- A Night on Smuggler's Island, 1993.
- The Sign of the Crab, 1994.
- Cats and Burglars, 1995.
- The Clue of the Missing Cuff-Link, 1996.
- Trouble on the Train, 1997.

==== "Read and Explain" series ====
The "Read and Explain" books are written by Ray Wild and published by Collins Publishers in London, England.

- A Car Called Maurice, 1982.
- A Telephone Called Tim, 1982.
- A Clock Called Kate, 1983.
- A Television Called Sammy, 1983.
