= Goggle-Eyes =

1989 children's novel by Anne Fine

- First edition
- Author: Anne Fine
- Language: English
- Genre: Children's novel
- Publisher: Hamish Hamilton
- Publication date: 23 March 1989
- Publication place: United Kingdom
- Media type: Print (hardcover, paperback)
- Pages: 140 pp (first edition)
- ISBN: 0-241-12617-7
- OCLC: 411138475
- LC Class: PZ7.F495673 Go 1989

Goggle-Eyes, or My War with Goggle-Eyes in the US, is a children's novel by Anne Fine, published by Hamilton in 1989. It features a girl who thinks she hates her mother's boyfriend. In the frame story, set in a Scottish day school, that girl Kitty tells her friend Helen about hating her mother's boyfriend.

Fine won the annual Carnegie Medal from the Library Association, recognising the year's best children's book by a British author. She also won the Guardian Children's Fiction Prize, a similar award that authors may not win twice. Six books have won both awards in 45 years through 2011. (Note: Alternatively, six authors have won the Carnegie Medal for their Guardian Prize-winning books. Professional librarians confer the Carnegie and select the winner from all British children's books. The Guardian newspaper's prize winner is selected by British children's writers, "peers" of the author who has not yet won it, for one children's (age 7+) or young-adult fiction book. Details regarding author and publisher nationality have varied.)

Goggle-Eyes was adapted for television by the BBC in 1993.

Little, Brown published a US edition under its Joy Street Books imprint in 1989, entitled My War with Goggle-Eyes.

== Plot summary ==
The story is told in the first person, by Kitty Killen. It is set in Scotland in the 1980s, when anti-nuclear protests were prominent in the news.

When Helen runs out of the classroom in distress, Mrs Lupey sends Kitty after her, despite the two not being particular friends. Kitty soon realises that Helen dislikes the man her mother is going to marry, so she tells her the story of how she first loathed Gerald, her mother's boyfriend, and how she gradually got used to him, despite his anti-CND views. "Goggle-Eyes"' is the nickname Kitty gives Gerald, because of the way he stares ("goggles") at Kitty's mother. The story is told in a cloakroom cupboard during one morning, with occasional interruptions from Liz and Mrs Lupey.

== The characters ==
- Kitty Killen, a Scottish schoolgirl, the narrator
- Rosalind "Rosie" Killen, Kitty's mother, a nurse
- Judith "Jude" Killen, Kitty's younger sister
- Gerald "Goggle-Eyes" Faulkner, Rosalind's boyfriend
- Helen "Helly" Johnston, a classmate of Kitty's
- Liz, Helen's best friend
- Mrs Lupey, the form teacher
- Josie, Beth, Ben and others, CND protesters
- Inspector McGee, head of the police presence at the protest
- Mr Killen, Rosalind's ex-husband
- Mrs Harrison, Kitty's and Jude's babysitter
- Simon, one of Rosalind's boyfriends
- Floss, the Killens' cat

== Literary significance and reception ==
Goggle-Eyes was awarded the Carnegie Medal for 1989 and the Guardian Prize in 1990, the two most prestigious British awards for children's literature. It was also shortlisted for the Smarties Award in 1990 and the German Youth Literature Prize in 1993.

== Television adaptation ==
Goggle-Eyes was adapted for television by the BBC as a four-episode mini-series, which was broadcast in 1993. It starred Honeysuckle Weeks as Kitty. The screenwriter, Deborah Moggach, won the Writer's Guild Award for Best Adapted TV Serial. Anti-nuclear protests had diminished after the 1991 close of the Cold War so the story was revised to feature a more timely issue, Green politics.

== Notes ==
Awards
Preceded by A Pack of Lies	Carnegie Medal recipient 1989	Succeeded by Wolf
