= Bill's New Frock =

1989 children's book by Anne Fine

- First edition
- Author: Anne Fine
- Illustrator: Philippe Dupasquier
- Language: English
- Genre: Children's
- Publisher: Methuen
- Publication date: 1989
- Publication place: United Kingdom
- Media type: Print (Hardcover)
- Pages: 96
- ISBN: 0-416-12152-7

Bill's New Frock is a fiction book for younger readers, written by Anne Fine and illustrated by Philippe Dupasquier. First published in 1989, and reissued in 2002, it concerns a young boy, Bill Simpson, who wakes up one morning to find he has transformed into a girl. Now forced to go to school in a pink dress, Bill discovers one of the worst days in his life is about to unfold. Baffled by the way things are just different for girls, Bill falls headlong into trouble. The book was adapted into a television special, which first aired on 6 June 1998.

The book has been used in United Kingdom schools to challenge gender stereotyping among primary school students. A 2002 study by the Social Science Research Unit, University of London, found evidence of children considering ‘the different treatment that boys and girls receive’, after reading the book.

In 1989, Bill's New Frock was awarded a Nestlé Smarties Book Prize in the 6 to 8 years category.
