= Raking the Ashes =

2005 novel by Anne Fine

- First edition
- Author: Anne Fine
- Language: English
- Genre: Romance
- Publisher: Bantam Books
- Publication date: 2005
- Publication place: United Kingdom
- Media type: Print
- Pages: 409
- ISBN: 0593054121
- OCLC: 937246336

Raking the Ashes is a 2005 novel by Anne Fine. It is narrated in the first person by Tilly. Tilly has always been adept at knowing and getting what she wants out of life. Until she meets Geoffrey, gentle and generous to a fault, with his two little children and an ex-wife who can only think of Tilly in terms of stereotypes.

== Plot summary ==
After an initial meeting on the beach years earlier, Tilly meets the long divorced Geoffrey at a party. She soon divorces her husband and Geoffrey moves in with her. Tilly very much enjoys having another person in the house to help cook and clean, and who loves and accepts her entirely, especially as she recognises that she is not a very nice person. However, Tilly has problems with Geoffrey's fundamental dishonesty and his refusal to share his family with her and Tilly is resentful at simply being a 'pleat' in the family economy, there to be taken in and then let out (let down) when she is not needed. Tilly is good enough to help look after the children for months on end while their mother is in America to treat her cancer, yet when it comes to choosing a school for Harry she can be safely left out while granny, who is barely part of their lives, is invited to help choose the school. Though it is fine for Tilly to spend hours in the middle of the night at Harry's bedside listening to his nightmares and the gruesome stories he hears at school, her suggestion to Geoffrey that he see a counselor is rubbished as Geoffrey thinks 'I know my own child', and Geoffrey even fails to mention the letter from school describing Harry's destructive behaviour.

Time and again Tilly is driven to dislike, and even hate Geoffrey over his dishonesty, Geoffrey's refusal to listen to her hints about his children ('Minna's persistent truancy, Harry's strange, quiet slidings on and off the rails'), or to live in the real world, his refusal to tell her about major financial decisions (selling his late fathers cottage, getting a second mortgage, giving his ex-wife significant financial help for various cancer treatments that even he believes cannot work).

When Tilly finds that Geoffrey's desire to be nice resulted in his agreeing to his son's wedding at a time when it was impossible for Tilly to come, merely to save the mother of the bride the loss of the deposit on her holiday, and that he then lied to Tilly about it, pretending that they were never consulted about the date, she is finally given the impetus to leave, and to exact revenge.
