= A Pack of Liars =

1988 children fiction novel by Anne Fine

- First edition cover
- Author: Anne Fine
- Language: English
- Genre: Children's
- Publisher: Hamish Hamilton
- Publication date: 1988
- Publication place: United Kingdom
- Media type: Print (Hardcover)
- Pages: 160 pages
- ISBN: 0-241-12229-5

A Pack of Liars is a children fiction novel by Anne Fine, first published by Hamish Hamilton in 1988. It won the Dillons/Puffin Birmingham Book Award in 1991.
