= The Road of Bones =

2006 young adult novel by Anne Fine

- First edition
- Author: Anne Fine
- Language: English
- Publisher: Doubleday
- Publication date: 1 June 2006
- Publication place: United Kingdom
- Media type: Print (Hardback)
- Pages: 224 pp
- ISBN: 0-385-61063-7
- OCLC: 64312672

The Road of Bones is a 2006 young adult novel written by Anne Fine. It was shortlisted for the 2007 Carnegie Medal. The judges described it as being "incredibly well-written" and having "political resonance for young people".

== Setting ==
The story is set in Stalinist Russia, a totalitarian state with prison camps in the icy north. The author has said that it was inspired by Anne Applebaum's Gulag.

== Plot summary ==
The story centres on a Russian boy named Yuri who in school is taught that the revolution liberated his country, and that the new leaders are always working for greater good. But the life for his family and people around him is full of poverty and misery, and the government only punishes those who protest. And one day Yuri is considered an 'enemy of the state' for saying a few careless words, and is sent to a camp in the frozen wastelands of Siberia.

== Literary significance and reception ==
Reviewers commented on the power and intelligence of the book while noting its appropriate bleakness. The Scotsman rated it "without doubt one of the top novels of the year" and the Sunday Times reviewer wrote: "This ambitious book is a rare achievement... This book is subtle, stimulating and morally complex, but it is also evocative and convincing: we feel keenly the chill of both soulless hegemony and its frozen wastes".

== See also ==
- R504 Kolyma Highway known as "Road of Bones" as more than 250 000 prisoners died during construction
