= The Other Darker Ned =

1979 novel by Anne Fine

The Other, Darker Ned
- First edition (publ. Methuen)
- Author: Anne Fine
- Language: English
- Publication date: 1979

The Other, Darker Ned is a 1979 novel written by author Anne Fine. The story is about a girl called Ione who hears her blind father, Professor Muffet, complaining to his secretary that she only ever 'mopes' and he wishes that she would do something. She then goes to an Oxfam shop and is shocked when she learns about poverty in India.

Ione holds a jumble sale in the village to buy a bullock for farmers in India who are dying. The title The Other, Darker Ned refers to the character she sees in her head who has a resemblance of her friend Ned. She becomes so shaken by the image that she decides to stop at nothing to hold the jumble sale. She is extremely successful and manages to buy two bullocks, get Ned, and his girlfriend (Professor Muffet's secretary) to stop quarrelling and fall in love.
