= Driving in the Dark (novel) =

Novel by Deborah Moggach

- First edition
- Author: Deborah Moggach
- Language: English
- Publisher: Hamish Hamilton
- Publication date: 1988
- Publication place: United Kingdom
- Media type: Print
- Pages: 247
- ISBN: 0-241-12499-9

Driving in the Dark is a novel by English writer Deborah Moggach published in 1988 by Hamish Hamilton.

== Plot ==
Coach driver Desmond's Greek wife Eleni has thrown him out. Desmond decides to look for his son Edward, the result of a short relationship with CND supporter Lesley while he taught her to drive. Once Lesley was pregnant she told Desmond to leave and that the child did not need a father. Desmond sets off from Orpington in his Volvo coach, via Leicester, the M6, Windermere, Spalding, Reading and Greenham Common, as he learns more about Edward and Lesley. Eventually Desmond finds them in Deal in Kent.

== Reception ==
Philip Howard writing in The Times reveals that 'There are only ten basic plots for fiction. Driving in the Dark is the primeval quest one, modernized for out Thatcherite England...This knight errant is a long-distance coach-driver from Orpington called Desmond...The clues are nebulous. The quest takes the knight by motorway and lay-by through the romantic heartlands of modern England...meeting en route all kinds of characteristic persons and adventures.' and concludes that 'This is a charming parable, with a happy ending for the eighties.'

Penny Perrick from The Sunday Times is also positive: 'Desmond's cross-country ride in search of his son is a deftly described odyssey that places the battle of the sexes in a new arena. This novel manages to be both disturbing and witty.'

The Irish Times writes that 'Moggach, for the purposes of the book, has turned herself into a bloke. His monologue throughout strikes me as totally authentic, but not only does Moggach get his lingo right, she thinks through his head, dramatizing his confusion, decency, wit, pain and determination. This is not just ventriloquism, but empathy so complete as to be phenomenal.'
