= Seesaw (TV series) =

British television crime drama, written by Deborah Moggach

- Genre: Crime drama
- Written by: Deborah Moggach
- Directed by: George Case
- Starring: Jonathan Firth; Murray Head; Cheryl Campbell; Bob Peck; John Shrapnel; Abigail Cruttenden
- Composer: Carl Davis
- Country of origin: United Kingdom
- Original language: English
- No. of series: 1
- No. of episodes: 3

Production
- Executive producers: Davina Belling; Philip Hinchcliffe; Clive Parsons
- Producer: Gillian Gordon
- Cinematography: Chris Seager
- Editor: Ardan Fisher
- Running time: 60 minutes
- Production companies: Film and General Productions; Scottish Television

Original release
- Network: ITV
- Release: 12 March – 26 March 1998

Seesaw is a three-part British television crime drama, written by Deborah Moggach and directed by George Case, first broadcast on ITV on 12 March 1998. The series, based upon Moggach's own novel of the same name, stars David Suchet and Geraldine James as Morris and Val Price, an upper-middle class couple whose daughter, Hannah, is kidnapped and held to ransom for £500,000. Forced to sell everything they own to ensure the safe return of their daughter, Morris and Val are further shattered by the revelation that Hannah is pregnant with the kidnapper's baby.

Notably, Moggach altered the ending of Seesaw for the television production, claiming this was for "various reasons" and citing that as a complete piece, "the book in itself works better". For the television adaptation, Moggach continued her tradition of having a walk-on cameo in each of her productions, managing to break her own personal record by appearing six times through the three episodes as various different characters.

The series was later released on Region 1 DVD in the United States and Region 2 DVD in the Netherlands, although remains unreleased in the United Kingdom. When later re-broadcast on True Entertainment, the series was re-edited into two feature-length episodes.

== Cast ==
- David Suchet as Morris Price
- Geraldine James as Val Price
- Amanda Ooms as Eva
- Neil Stuke as Jon
- Joanna Potts as Hannah Price
- Jade Davidson as Becky Price
- Joseph Beattie as Theo Price
- Chloe Tucker as Emma
- Christopher Benjamin as Malcolm Green

== Episodes ==
No.	Title	Directed by	Written by	Original release date
1	"Episode 1"	George Case	Deborah Moggach	12 March 1998
Morris and Val Price are thrown into turmoil by the disappearance of their teenage daughter, Hannah, and the arrival of a ransom note demanding £500,000.
2	"Episode 2"	George Case	Deborah Moggach	19 March 1998
Hannah is released, but her ordeal has left scars that may never heal, and even though parents Val and Morris are elated to have her back, their joy is tempered by the realisation that for them, the good life is well and truly over.
3	"Episode 3"	George Case	Deborah Moggach	26 March 1998
On top of everything they've been through, the Price family are dealt another crushing blow when Val discovers Morris is having an affair. Worse still, it becomes clear daughter Hannah's ordeal is far from over as one of her former kidnappers, by now completely unhinged, begins stalking her.
