= To Have and to Hold (Moggach novel) =

1986 novel by Deborah Moggach

- First US edition
- Author: Deborah Moggach
- Language: English
- Publisher: Viking (UK); E.P. Dutton (US)
- Publication date: 1986
- Publication place: United Kingdom
- Media type: Print
- Pages: 320
- ISBN: 0-670-80812-1

To Have and to Hold, is a novel by English author Deborah Moggach, first published in 1986 by Viking. The novel started as the script for an eight-part television drama for London Weekend Television, screened in September 1986.

== Plot introduction ==
Liberated Viv, happily married to Ollie, decides to bear a surrogate baby for her sterile sister Ann, but instead of artificial insemination conceives naturally with her brother-in-law Ken, who falls in love with her.

== Reception ==
- According to Nicholas Shakespeare in The Times, "A very good novel indeed – contemporary in its subject, compassionate in its treatment of the four central characters, and intelligent in its pursuit of the many hares they start." but goes on to write "While going a bundle on images of fecundity, Moggach does have an instinctive eye for the tell-tale gestures people use to hurt or avoid each other. Nevertheless, there is a sense she only realises half way through quite what she is taking on."
- Its origins as a television script are exposed by Jill Neville writing in The Sunday Times, "A VERY 'hot' subject like surrogate motherhood seems suspiciously commercial for a novel of quality. And each scene in Deborah Moggach's To Have and to Hold is written, frame by frame, as if set up for a TV camera, starring the Stringalongs, circa 1985." but she goes on to write "Despite the journalistic breeziness of her style, Moggach paces her sexual minuet with craft and conveys the authentic hot rush of maternal passion."

== Television drama ==
- Viv – Amanda Redman
- Ann – Marion Bailey
- Ollie – Brian Protheroe
- Ken – Eamon Boland
