= The Ex-Wives =

1993 novel by Deborah Moggach

- First edition
- Author: Deborah Moggach
- Language: English
- Publisher: William Heinemann Ltd
- Publication date: 1993
- Publication place: United Kingdom
- Media type: Print
- Pages: 272
- ISBN: 0-434-47351-0

The Ex-Wives, is a 1993 novel by English author Deborah Moggach.

== Plot introduction ==
The book is set in London and concerns Buffy, a 61-year old actor as his third marriage breaks down and he is left with only his dog George for company in his cluttered flat off the Edgware Road. Then he meets and falls in love with Celeste, newly arrived in London from Melton Mowbray who takes a keen interest in not just Buffy, but in his ex-wives, children and step-children and sets out to meet them all.

== Inspiration ==
On her website the author explains that at the time she wrote the novel her partner was cartoonist Mel Calman, and that the books main character Russell Buffery "isn’t based on Mel but has some of his problems, including a bad back, assorted step-children and a tendency to find himself in vaguely humiliating situations"

== Reception ==
- Peter Kemp, writing in The Sunday Times calls it a "whirligig of a novel", and that "casting a keen eye over contemporary customs is where it comes into its own". He concludes "the book nips around commenting on curiosities, in its jaunty, noticing style. Meanwhile, alongside this zesty documentary, the stresses and lonelinesses resulting from changing social patterns are registered and the plucky, inventive and resilient ways in which people cope with them are applauded. Likeably, The Ex-Wives marries comedy and canniness into a novel that's warm, tolerant, shrewd and exuberant."
- Hugh Barnes from The Independent has reservations: "A cleverly messy-seeming novel mostly about the increasingly mutinous ex-wives and offspring of a superannuated actor. The structure, as so often in Moggach, is of a domestic symmetry placed in jeopardy and then patted back into temporary balance. But here her talent for describing family love struggles to find expression as the narrative meanders towards a jarringly melodramatic climax. 'We're not a mini-series, dear,' says one of the ex-wives at the end. Not yet, anyway."

== Sequel ==
Buffy returns as the main protagonists in Moggach's 2013 novel Heartbreak Hotel where he runs 'Courses for Divorces' in a hotel in Wales.
