= Penny Dale =

English illustrator and writer

- Occupations: Illustrator; author
- Years active: 1987–present
- Notable work: Ten in the Bed
- Awards: Oppenheim Toy Portfolio Award; Kate Greenaway Medal (commended)
- Website: pennydale.co.uk

Penny Dale is an English illustrator and writer of children's books.

== Background ==
Dale studied Fine Arts and graduated from Exeter College of Art and Design. She moved to South East Wales in 1982, and currently resides in Caerleon, a village in Newport. Dale is married and has one daughter.

== Career ==
Her picture books as author-illustrator include Ten in the Bed, which won the Oppenheim Toy Portfolio Award in 2002, Wake Up Mr. B! which was commended for the Kate Greenaway Medal, and more recently her Dinosaur series with Nosy Crow.

She has also illustrated books by other writers, including Anne Fine and Martin Waddell.

Dale's illustrations for Rosie's Babies, a picture book written by Waddell which aims to introduce children to the idea of a new sibling, were shortlisted for the Kate Greenaway Medal in 1990.

In 2003, Dale illustrated Anne Fine's Jamie and Angus, a book of short stories for young readers rooted in the domestic concerns of one child. The book won the Boston Globe–Horn Book Awards.

Ten in the Bed is Dale's best-known book. According to her publisher, as of 2013 the book had sold "nearly two million copies". It led to two sequels, Ten Out of Bed and Ten Play Hide and Seek.

In 2018, Ten in the Bed became the first CBeebies bedtime story to be signed in Makaton. It was performed by Rob Delaney and aired on the BBC channel in November.

== Books ==
=== As writer and illustrator ===
- Bet You Can't! (1987)
- Ten in the Bed (1988)
- Wake Up Mr. B! (1988) —a runner-up for the Greenaway Medal
- The Elephant Tree (1991)
- All About Alice (1992)
- Ten Out of Bed (1993)
- Daisy Rabbit's Tree House (1995)
- Big Brother, Little Brother (1997)
- Ten Play Hide and Seek (1998)
- Princess Princess (2003)
- Boy on the Bus (2007)
- Princess Fairy (2009)
- Dinosaur Dig! (2011)
- Dinosaur Zoom! (2012)
- Dinosaur Rescue! (2014)
- Dinosaur Rocket! (2015)
- Dinosaur Pirates! (2016)
- Dinosaur Farm! (2019)

=== As illustrator only ===
- The Stopwatch, written by David Lloyd (1986)
- Rosies Babies, Martin Waddell (1990) —on the Greenaway Medal shortlist
- Once There Were Giants, Waddell (1994)
- The Mushroom Hunt, Simon Frazer (1994)
- When the Teddy Bears Came, Waddell (1994)
- Night Night Cuddly Bear, Waddell (2000)
- My Shadow, Robert Louis Stevenson (2001)
- Jamie and Angus, Anne Fine (2002)
- Time to Say I Love You, Jane Kemp & Clare Walters (2006)
- Jamie and Angus Together, Fine (2007)
- Jamie and Angus Forever, Fine (2009)
