= Paul Howard (illustrator) =

British book illustrator (born 1967)

Paul Howard (born 1 April 1967) is a British children's illustrator. He provided the illustrations for The Bravest Ever Bear, written by Allan Ahlberg, which won a Blue Peter Book Award. He has also worked with such well-known authors as Anne Fine, Gene Kemp, Joan Lingard, Penelope Lively, Jan Mark and Jenny Nimmo, among others, as well as illustrating several volumes in the Animal Ark Pets series.

Howard's illustrations in The Bravest Ever Bear were praised by The School Librarian and The Horn Book Magazine. His illustrations in "Esmeralda and the Children Next Door" were praised by The School Librarian. and The Horn Book Magazine.
