= Net Bandits =

1998 novel by Michael Coleman

First edition (publ. Macmillan)

Net Bandits is the first of the fictional series Internet Detectives by Michael Coleman. It was first published in 1996. The story is accompanied by illustrations of some of the applications of the Internet. A movie based on the book and retaining the title was made by Eric Wotila in 2004

== Plot summary ==
A couple of teenagers start exploring the Internet in order to submit a school report on the advantages and disadvantages of using it. A friendly netizen, using the id, ZMASTER corresponds with one of them through email. The same person, after some time, sends an email appealing for urgent help. A series of email exchanges to find out the identity of the sender follow, as the sleuths race with time
