= Hot Water Man =

1982 novel by Deborah Moggach

- First edition (UK)
- Author: Deborah Moggach
- Cover artist: Shirley Tuckley
- Language: English
- Publisher: Jonathan Cape (UK); William Morrow (US)
- Publication date: 1982
- Publication place: United Kingdom
- Media type: Print
- Pages: 251
- ISBN: 0-224-01994-5

Hot Water Man, is the fourth novel by the English author Deborah Moggach, first published in 1982 by Jonathan Cape and set in Karachi, Pakistan.

== Inspiration ==
Deborah Moggach explains: 'Five years after I returned home from Karachi I wrote a novel that was set there. Maybe it takes that long for experiences to be absorbed and reassembled into fiction. I loosely based one of the characters on myself, an English woman who rebels against the ex-pat community in Pakistan and lands in trouble. This novel, however, has a large ensemble cast consisting of Pakistanis, Brits, Americans. And a holy man. I wanted to explore the culture clash between Islam and the West, run with it and have some fun with it, and drew on my memories of living there.'

== Plot introduction ==
Donald Manley and his wife Christine move from England to sweltering Karachi. Donald is trying to recapture his exploits of his Grandfather's army past. Christine is determined to 'go native' as she attempts to immerse herself in the culture of Pakistan; trying to form her ideals in a strict Islamic society, much to Donald's embarrassment. The couple are also struggling to conceive, where Christine learns that the 'Hot Water Man' can help their struggles. Meanwhile, American businessman Duke Hanson, is tempted by a smart, rich Pakistani girl whose uncle is a minister in charge of the planning permission that Duke requires to build a hotel where both a donkey sanctuary and shrine are situated.

== Reception ==
- Harriet Waugh in The Spectator has mixed views about Moggach that 'even though her characters are merely well-drawn stereotypes - and not very interesting ones at that - she succeeds in creating a lively satire on the cross-fertilization of two cultures...None of the characters are original creations. They are there to represent certain common attitudes to India. This prevents the novel from rising much above the moral fable, which is a pity because the author has succeeded in giving the exact flavour of British ex-patriot life, its attitudes, and the almost inevitable archaic role it is forced to play.
- James Campbell from New Statesman also has reservations, he says of Moggach that 'understanding is at the heart of her perceptive, entertaining fourth novel' and that she 'moves the story along at in an accomplished fashion, managing to develop a surprising number of themes and only occasionally caricaturing the figures she mostly succeeds in satirising.' her 'neat prose does not evoke the East as one might have hoped, but my main complaint is that the ending left me wanting a few more clues about the shape that Christine's life would be taking'
- Daily Mail writes 'Wincingly funny...a tragi-comedy of manners and errors....Ms Moggach has lived there, and it shows. She's sound on the heat, squalor and frustrations, the feel and pulse of a place where Europeans can't really go native since so many natives have half-taken to European ways. It's an ambitious book showing Asia through British and American eyes; compassionate, yet never sloppy, it notes the flaws and frailties of East and West without mockery'.
