= Ten in the Bed =

Book by Penny Dale

- Author: Penny Dale
- Illustrator: Penny Dale
- Language: English
- Genre: Children's picture book
- Publisher: Walker Books
- Publication date: 1988
- Publication place: United Kingdom
- Media type: Hardcover
- ISBN: 1406353094

Ten in the Bed is a picture book for young children, written and illustrated by Penny Dale and published in 1988 by Walker Books. It is an adaptation of the well-known counting nursery rhyme of the same name. The familiar refrain "roll over!" is intact, but it features one central child character and their nine soft toys, instead of the ten children implied in the original.

== Origin ==
''Ten in the Bed'', ''There were Ten in a bed'' or ''There Were Ten in a bed'' is an English-language nursery rhyme, counting-out rhyme, action song and a children's song.

The first version of the song lyrics are:

There were ten in the bed, and the little one said:
"Roll over! Roll over!”
So they all rolled over and one fell out.

The song then mentions "nine in a bed" and continues to repeat until "one in the bed". The "little one" then says "I'm lonely" or "Goodnight".

== Adaptation ==
In 2018, comedian and actor Rob Delaney read and signed Ten in the Bed in Makaton, a particular form of sign language. Broadcast on the BBC children’s channel CBeebies, it was the first of their regular bedtime stories series to use the language, which Delaney had learnt to communicate with his late son. Producer Claire Taylor described the feedback as "overwhelming", and said plans were in the works for more signed stories.

== Legacy ==
Ten in the Bed won the Oppenheim Toy Portfolio Award in 2002. It was followed by sequels Ten Out of Bed and Ten Play Hide and Seek. In 2014, the Birmingham Mail noted the book was number 48 in Birmingham’s most borrowed library books.

According to the 25th anniversary edition, it has sold “almost 2 million copies".
