= A Quiet Drink =

1980 novel by Deborah Moggach

- First edition
- Author: Deborah Moggach
- Language: English
- Publisher: Collins
- Publication date: 1980
- Publication place: United Kingdom
- Media type: Print
- Pages: 224
- ISBN: 0-00-221678-7

A Quiet Drink is the third novel by the English author Deborah Moggach, first published in 1980. Unlike her previous novels it departs from the autobiographical.

== Plot introduction ==
The book is set in London and concerns Claudia, a magazine editor whose husband has just left her, Steve Mullen, a cosmetics representative, and his wife June. Claudia is still yearning after her husband but then finds herself a lodger, the mysterious Alistair, a librarian who keeps a diary which Claudia is desperate to read. Steve is realising his marriage to June is beginning to lose its sparkle, while June has given up her job and is spending time at the library trying to educate herself. Eventually Steve and Claudia meet and go for "a quiet drink" which has far-reaching consequences.

== Publication history ==
- 1980, UK, Collins, hardcover, ISBN 0-00-221678-7
- 1985, US, St. Martin's Press, hardcover, ISBN 0-312-66106-1
- 1991, UK, Mandarin/Arrow, publication date 1 July 1991, paperback, ISBN 0-7493-0924-5
