= The Tulip Touch =

1996 children's novel by Anne Fine

- First edition (UK)
- Author: Anne Fine
- Language: English
- Genre: Children's literature
- Publisher: Hamish Hamilton
- Publication place: United Kingdom

The Tulip Touch is a children's novel written by Anne Fine and published in 1996. The book raises questions of morality and accountability, as well as exploring the question of nature versus nurture. It won the Whitbread Award and was Highly Commended for the Carnegie Medal.

== Plot ==
The story begins as Natalie Barnes, a girl who lived in hotels all her life, and her parents move to stay permanently in The Palace Hotel, where her father will be the manager. They meet Tulip Pierce, a charming, introverted girl who tells imaginative yet unbelievable stories, with embellishments which Natalie's father refers to as "the Tulip touch; small details which almost made you wonder if she was telling the truth.

Tulip is seldom seen in Natalie's new school. As their relationship grows, Natalie notices the slight change in her friend's behaviour. Tulip was always unpopular and disliked amongst the other children, but that wasn't all. Soon, her games change from awkward and annoying to sadistic and often dangerous, such as tormenting strangers or endangering Natalie's younger brother Julius. Natalie finds out that Tulip's father is abusive to Tulip and her mother. Natalie's family are initially sympathetic towards Tulip, knowing the extent of the abuse to which Tulip and her mother are subjected. However, as her behaviour becomes more dangerous and erratic, Natalie's parents encourage her to end the friendship for their own good.

Eventually, when Tulip sets fire to an old shed, Natalie realises Tulip's behaviour is out of control- suppose one day she sets fire to a building with someone in it? Although other people seem mundane in comparison to Tulip's spontaneity and wild imagination, Natalie makes new friends. Meanwhile, Tulip's behaviour has grown more violent, stabbing bus seats and burning litter bins. When Tulip is not invited to the big Christmas party at The Palace, she manages to burn down the hotel, endangering Natalie's family and their guests.

At the close of the novel, Natalie has moved to a new hotel with her family and things are going well for them. Her family, teachers, and the community all criticise Tulip, but Natalie feels immense guilt over what happened. Although she was too young to recognise the signs of abuse, Natalie wonders why the adults in their lives never helped Tulip.

== Major themes ==
The book was inspired by the highly publicised murder of James Bulger, a two-year-old boy who was kidnapped, tortured and killed by a pair of ten-year-olds. Like the case, the story raises the question of nature versus nurture - in other words, are some children born bad, or are evil children the product of their circumstances? Fine stated in a 1998 interview that "it was not just the murder itself" that inspired her, "but the ghastly British response to it: 'Lock 'em up and throw away the key'".

== Reception ==
The book received some criticism, along with others on the 2021 Carnegie Medal shortlist, for being too "grim" for children.
