= Ione Fine =

Visual neuroscientist

- Education: University of Rochester
- Scientific career
- Workplaces: University of Washington
- Thesis: Perceptual learning for discriminating complex gratings (1999)
- Website: www.finelab.org

Ione Fine is a neuroscientist and professor in the psychology department at the University of Washington, Seattle. She is known for her research examining how people adapt to sensory loss.

== Early life and education ==
Ione Fine is the daughter of writer Anne Fine and philosopher Kit Fine.

She received her BS in Philosophy, Physiology, and Psychology from Merton College, Oxford in 1993. She received an M.A. in 1996 from the University of Rochester, and then earned her Ph.D. in 1999 from the Center for Vision Science within the Department of Brain and Cognitive Sciences at the University of Rochester. Fine then pursued post-doctoral work with Professors Donald MacLeod and Karen Dobkins at the University of California, San Diego.

Between 2004–2007, she held a joint appointment at Second Sight Medical Products LLC and the Doheny Eye Institute and Zilkha Neurogenetic Institute at USC. In 2007, she moved to the Department of Psychology at the University of Washington, where she was promoted to full professor in 2014.

== Work ==
Fine's research focuses on the perceptual, neural, and cognitive mechanisms underlying adaptation to sensory loss, including deafness and blindness. She has also worked on the development of computational models for new technologies for sight recovery, such as 'bionic eyes'. Fine's research has examined how people who regain their sight interpret visual cues.

Fine has also advocated for better inclusion of female scientists in high-profile journals.

== Selected publications ==
- Finney, Eva M.; Fine, Ione; Dobkins, Karen R. (2001). "Visual stimuli activate auditory cortex in the deaf". Nature Neuroscience. 4 (12): 1171–1173. doi:10.1038/nn763. ISSN 1097-6256. PMID 11704763.
- Fine, I.; Jacobs, R. A. (2002-04-01). "Comparing perceptual learning across tasks: A review". Journal of Vision. 2 (2): 190–203. doi:10.1167/2.2.5. ISSN 1534-7362. PMID 12678592.
- Fine, Ione; Wade, Alex R; Brewer, Alyssa A; May, Michael G; Goodman, Daniel F; Boynton, Geoffrey M; Wandell, Brian A; MacLeod, Donald I A (2003). "Long-term deprivation affects visual perception and cortex". Nature Neuroscience. 6 (9): 915–916. doi:10.1038/nn1102. ISSN 1097-6256. PMID 12937420.
- Fine, Ione; Finney, Eva M.; Boynton, Geoffrey M.; Dobkins, Karen R. (2005-10-01). "Comparing the Effects of Auditory Deprivation and Sign Language within the Auditory and Visual Cortex". Journal of Cognitive Neuroscience. 17 (10): 1621–1637. doi:10.1162/089892905774597173. ISSN 0898-929X. PMID 16269101.

== Honors and awards ==
In 2010, she was elected fellow of the Optical Society of America in recognition of her service and academic achievement.
