= Charlotte Hough =

British author (1924–2008)

- Born: Helen Charlotte Woodyatt; 24 May 1924; Brockenhurst, Hampshire
- Died: 31 December 2008 (aged 84)
- Occupation(s): Writer, illustrator
- Spouse: Richard Hough
- Children: Deborah Moggach

Charlotte Hough (24 May 1924 – 31 December 2008) was a British author of over thirty illustrated children's books.

== Early life ==
Helen Charlotte Woodyatt (or Woodyadd) was born in Brockenhurst, Hampshire. Her father was a doctor in his fifties. Her mother, an actress, singer and pianist, was widowed in World War I with a son. Her parents divorced; Charlotte was raised by her mother. Her older half-brother, Roger Roughton, died by suicide in 1941. She served in the Women's Royal Navy Service (WRNS) during World War II.

== Career ==
Hough's wrote and illustrated over thirty children's books. Her subjects were often stories about children and animals; their titles included Jim Tiger (1956), The Hampshire Pig (1958), The Animal Game (1959), Algernon (1961), Anna and Minnie (1962), Three Little Funny Ones (1962), The Owl in the Barn (1964), The Trackers (1966), Educating Flora and Other Stories (1968), Sir Frog and Other Stories (1968), The Homemakers (1968), Abdul the Awful and Other Stories (1970), A Bad Child's Book of Moral Verse (1970), My Aunt's Alphabet (1971), Queer Customer (1972), Wonky Donkey (1975), Pink Pig (1975), Bad Cat (1975), The Holiday Story Book (1976), The Mixture as Before (1976), and Verse and Various (1979). Kirkus Reviews found Hough's Red Biddy and Other Stories (1966) to offer "original fairy tales with a sunny disposition".

Hough also illustrated works by others, including editions of Anna Sewell's Black Beauty, M. E. Atkinson's Castaway Camp (1952) and The Barnstormers (1953), Susan Coolidge's What Katy Did (1958), Marjorie M. Oliver's Land of Ponies (1951), April Jaffe's The Enchanted Horse (1953), and several books by Anita Hewett.

She wrote one book for adults, a detective novel, The Bassington Murder (1980).

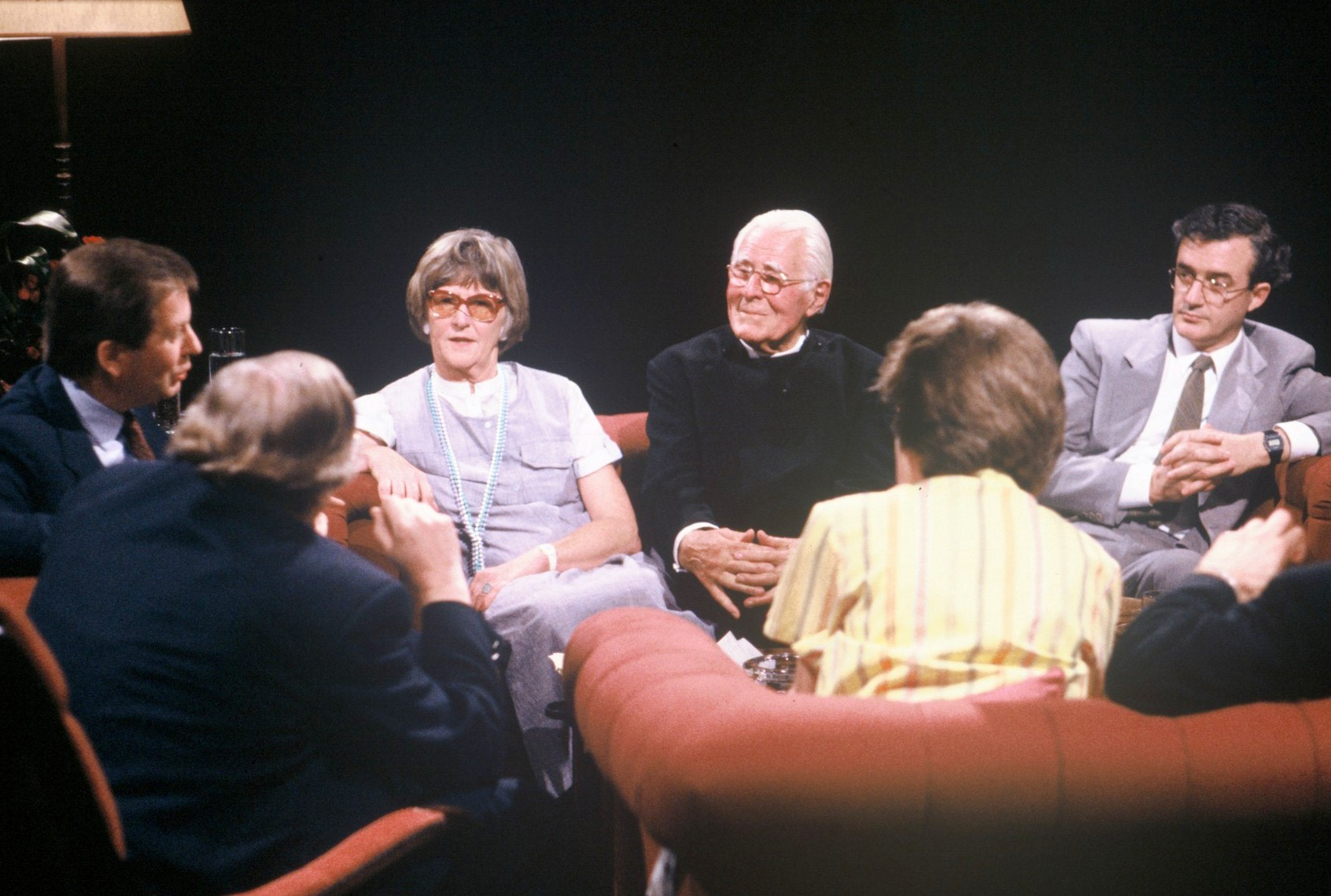
Charlotte Hough appearing on a television discussion programme After Dark in 1987. Others in the photograph are (pictured from left) host Ian Kennedy, Lord Soper, and John Finnis.

== Assisted suicide case ==
In 1985, at age 60, Hough was convicted of attempted murder, for assisting the suicide of a friend, Annetta Harding, aged 85 years, who was depressed, blind, deaf, and in chronic pain from arthritis. Hough was sentenced to nine months imprisonment, and served six months at Holloway Prison and Sutton Park prison. Her daughter recalled that, afterwards, "She was always saying, 'When I was in prison' and bringing dinner parties to a shuddering halt."

== Personal life ==
Charlotte Woodyatt married author Richard Hough in 1943; they raised four children, including the author Deborah Moggach. In 1997, Charlotte Hough married Dr Louis Ackroyd, a widower formerly in the Colonial Engineering Service and University of Nottingham. She died in 2008, aged 84 years, after two years of dementia. In 2009, her daughters donated two boxes of her original book illustrations to the Seven Stories Archive in Gateshead.
