= Kit Fine =

British philosopher (born 1946)

- Born: 26 March 1946 (age 80)
- Spouse: Anne Fine (divorced)
- Children: Cordelia Fine; Ione Fine

Education
- Education: University of Oxford (B.A., 1967); University of Warwick (Ph.D., 1969)
- Thesis: For Some Proposition and So Many Possible Worlds (1969)
- Doctoral advisor: A. N. Prior

Philosophical work
- Era: Contemporary philosophy
- Region: Western philosophy
- School: Analytic
- Institutions: New York University
- Main interests: Philosophical logic, metaphysics, philosophy of language
- Notable ideas: Defense of modal actualism, ontological dependence, arbitrary objects, defence of semantic relationism (Note: Semantic relationism is the thesis that the content of utterances is not entirely a matter of their intrinsic semantic features.) against semantic intrinsicalism (Note: Semantic intrinsicalism is the thesis that the content of utterances is fully determined by semantic features intrinsic to them.)

Kit Fine (born 26 March 1946) is a British philosopher who is the Silver Professor of Philosophy and Mathematics at New York University. Prior to joining the philosophy department of NYU in 1997, he taught at the University of Edinburgh, University of California, Irvine, University of Michigan and UCLA. The author of multiple books and over 100 articles in international academic journals, he has made notable contributions to the fields of philosophical logic, metaphysics, and the philosophy of language and also has written on ancient philosophy, in particular on Aristotle's account of logic and modality.

He is also a distinguished research professor in the Department of Philosophy, University of Birmingham, England. Since 2018, Fine is visiting professor at the University of Italian Switzerland.

== Education, family and career ==
After graduating from Balliol College, Oxford (B.A. in Philosophy, Politics, and Economics, 1967), Fine received his Ph.D. from the University of Warwick in 1969, under the supervision of A. N. Prior. He then taught at the University of Edinburgh, University of California, Irvine, University of Michigan, and UCLA, before moving to New York University as the Silver Professor and University Professor of Philosophy and Mathematics.

He was elected a Corresponding Fellow of the British Academy in 2005 and a Fellow of the American Academy of Arts & Sciences in 2006. He has held fellowships from the John Simon Guggenheim Memorial Foundation and the American Council of Learned Societies and is a former editor of the Journal of Symbolic Logic.

Fine has two daughters from his former marriage to Anne Fine. Anne Fine is an author of children's books; Cordelia Fine is a professor of philosophy at the University of Melbourne; Ione Fine is a professor at the University of Washington.

== Philosophical work ==
In addition to his primary areas of research, he has written papers in ancient philosophy, linguistics, computer science, and economic theory.

Fine has described his general approach to philosophy as follows: "I’m firmly of the opinion that real progress in philosophy can only come from taking common sense seriously. A departure from common sense is usually an indication that a mistake has been made."

== Awards ==
In 2013, Fine held the Gödel Lecture, titled Truthmaker semantics.

== Bibliography ==
- Worlds, Times, and Selves (with A. N. Prior). University of Massachusetts Press, 1977. ISBN 0-87023-227-4
- Reasoning With Arbitrary Objects. Blackwell, 1986. ISBN 0-631-13844-7
- The Limits of Abstraction. Oxford University Press, 2002. ISBN 0-19-924618-1
- Modality and Tense: Philosophical Papers. Oxford University Press, 2005. ISBN 0-19-927871-7
- Semantic Relationism. Blackwell, 2007. ISBN 978-1-4051-0844-7
- Vagueness: A Global Approach, Oxford University Press, 2020. ISBN 978-0-1975-1495-5

For a full 2023 listing of publications see "Bibliography of Kit Fine" (back matter from Kit Fine on Truthmakers, Relevance, and Non-classical Logic).

== Sources ==
- Silver Dialogues: Kit Fine
- Kit Fine's CV
