= Gay Firth =

Northern Irish author, journalist and political campaigner

- Born: Virginia Arabella Turtle; 9 January 1937; Belfast, Northern Ireland
- Died: 9 January 2005 (aged 68); London

Gay Firth (9 January 1937 – 9 January 2005) was a Northern Irish author, journalist and political campaigner.

== Early life and family ==
Gay Firth was born Virginia Arabella Turtle on 9 January 1937 in Belfast. Her parents were Lancelot Turtle, a Belfast businessman and stockbroker, and Helen Ramsey Turtle (1911–1946), born in Denver, Colorado, United States. She had two younger sisters. Firth's mother died from breast cancer when Firth was 9 years old. The Helen Ramsey Turtle scholarship in the Queen's University Belfast was established in her memory by her friends to foster friendship between Northern Ireland and the United States. The Turtle family were Quakers, and Firth attended The Mount, York, a Quaker boarding school. She entered Trinity College Dublin to study history, classics and politics, and graduated with a BA in 1959. She then moved to Cambridge to train as a teacher. She was active in both TCD and Cambridge societies, in the DU Players and the Cambridge Union.

== Career ==
Firth worked as a history teacher for a time, publishing a book on the joy of old furniture, Antiques anonymous (1964). Her husband, Tony Firth, a Cambridge graduate as well, was a journalist and broadcaster. They had one son and one daughter. The couple moved to Glasgow in 1970, when he took a position as the programmes controller in Scottish Television, the Firths also spent some time in the United States. Firth was appointed office manager and speechwriter at the new Equal Opportunities Commission in 1976. She is credited with aiding to convince UK legislators, and policy makers, on the importance of women's equality in employment and all other aspects of life. She co-authored What's for lunch, Mum? (1976) with Jane Donald.

When she was widowed in 1980, Firth worked freelance as a writer and journalist. She reviewed plays and books for The Times and the Financial Times, also working on foreign news, working as the letters editor on the Financial Times from 1980 to 1995. She was a member of the Athenaeum Club, served on a number of Quaker committees, and as chair of the Quaker House in London. She was one of the organisers of the "Quaker conferences for diplomats", an annual international meeting.

Firth was one of the founders of the Alliance Party of Northern Ireland in 1970. She and her husband, as Quakers, supported the party by writing letters to newspapers as well as briefings and other documentation on the party's goals and to increase its profile. She served as the party's first press officer. Firth joined the current affairs essay magazine, Prospect, after retirement where she helped to form its house style. Her contacts assisted the editor, whom she had worked with at the Financial Times. She died in London on 9 January 2005 from cancer.
