= Close to Home (Moggach novel) =

1979 novel by Deborah Moggach

- First edition
- Author: Deborah Moggach
- Language: English
- Publisher: Collins
- Publication date: 1979
- Publication place: United Kingdom
- Media type: Print & Audio
- Pages: 224
- ISBN: 0-00-222424-0

Close to Home, is the second novel by English author Deborah Moggach, first published in 1979 by Collins. It is mentioned in the 6th edition of the Bloomsbury Good Reading Guide. Like her first novel You Must Be Sisters it is semi-autobiographical and relates to a time when she was living in Camden Town with two small children, a husband who was often away on business, and struggling to write a novel.

== Plot introduction ==
The book is set in the long hot summer of 1976 in a suburban London street and concerns the occupants of two adjacent houses. In one lives Kate Cooper who struggles with her two young children and the domestic chores whilst keeping up appearances for her high-flying husband who works as a eurocrat in Brussels, spending little time at home. In the other lives Sam Green is struggling to write a novel whilst his wife goes out to work running a psychiatric practice and his angst-ridden teenage daughter binge eats in her bedroom. Kate and Sam are drawn together whilst their families are seemingly unaware...

== Reception ==
'Funny, affectionate and unpretentious...always a pleasure to read. Moggach has acute things to say about young married life, about looking after children, about the secret places behind noisy North London streets.' (New Statesman, Mar 30, 1979)

== Publication history ==
- 1979, UK, Collins, ISBN 0-00-222424-0, Pub date 29 Mar 1979, Hardback
- 1980, UK, Coronet, ISBN 0-340-26016-5, Pub date 01 Nov 1980, Paperback
- 1986, UK, Penguin, ISBN 0-14-008143-7, Pub date 30 Oct 1986, Paperback
- 1993, UK, Isis, ISBN 1-85695-423-4, Pub date Sep 1993, Audio cassette, read by Garard Green
- 1998, UK, Arrow, ISBN 0-7493-1229-7, Pub date 21 Oct 1998, Paperback
- 2001, US, Thorndike, ISBN 0-7862-3485-7, Pub date Nov 2001, Paperback
- 2002, UK, Chivers, ISBN 0-7540-1640-4, Pub date 01 Feb 2002, Large print (h/b)
- 2002, UK, Chivers, ISBN 0-7540-2494-6, Pub date 01 Nov 2002, Large print (p/b)
