= Something to Hide (novel) =

2015 novel by Deborah Moggach

- First edition (UK)
- Author: Deborah Moggach
- Language: English
- Publisher: Chatto and Windus
- Publication date: 2015
- Publication place: United Kingdom
- Media type: Print
- Pages: 247
- ISBN: 1784740462

Something to Hide is a novel by English author Deborah Moggach, published in 2015 by Chatto & Windus. Moggach wrote a short story called 'The Woman Who Carried a Shop on Her Head' in the 2010 collection Because I am a Girl by charity Plan International. The short story appears in the prologue at the beginning of the novel and is set in Ghana and includes Asaf who charges weekly mobile phones to spread malicious gossip. The main character in the novel is Petra who is loosely based on Moggach herself.

== Plot introduction ==
Petra lives in Pimlico in London, is single in her sixties, and her romantic life has not panned out as expected. She has been divorced and dabbled with internet dating without success. But now finds herself falling herself in love Jeremy who is married to her best friend Bev and lives in West Africa. Jeremy meets up with Petra and spends a spends a couple of weeks in London and decides to divorce Bev. Petra has always believed that Bev has the perfect marriage but has to face Bev as things spiral out of control and visits Bev in West Africa...

Meanwhile, Lorrie lives in Texas and falls for an internet scam and loses her savings of $48,000. Her husband Todd suspects nothing and is assigned to Iraq with the US Army. Lorrie decides to become a surrogate to a Chinese businessman Weng Lei and does not tell Todd. The drugs (from West Africa) suppress her appetite and her pregnancy should not prove too obvious.

In West Africa, Jeremy is possibly involved in criminal activity and Petra is told that Asaf knows about Jeremy. Wang Lei then disappears and so Lorries heads to West Africa as her pregnancy looms...

== Reception ==
- Shirley Whiteside writes in The Independent, "Skilfully, Moggach draws these disparate strands together, showing that even the most unlikely people can be connected in unexpected ways. In spite of their differences in age, lifestyle and geography, these women share a common characteristic; they are willing to betray their nearest and dearest in order to keep their secrets from being discovered. The women are all fully rounded characters who are easy to care for, particularly Petra whose warmth and humour, with some dark flourishes, is appealing. This is an absorbing read, with surprises and moments of tension that make it a genuine page-turner."
- Lucy Scholes in The Guardian concludes "The tangled lives of the first three lie at the heart of the novel, with the likable Petra as the central ballast, though I was eager to find out more about Lorrie. Despite some rather crazy plot twists towards the end, it's a gentle, easy-reading tale of happenstance and second chances.
