= Michael Coleman (author) =

British author of children's and young adult fiction

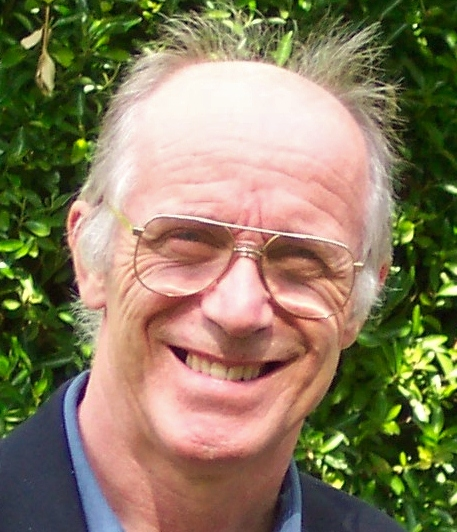
- Born: 12 May 1946 (age 80); Forest Gate, London, England
- Education: City University, London (Applied Mathematics)
- Occupation: Author
- Writing career
- Language: English
- Period: 1964–68
- Genres: Fiction and non-fiction for ages 0 - 14
- Website: www.michael-coleman.co.uk

Michael Coleman (born 12 May 1946) is a British author of children's and young adult fiction whose book, Weirdo's War, was shortlisted for the 1996 Carnegie Medal. One of his books, Net Bandits, has been adapted to film.

Coleman is a published author of children's books and young adult books. Some of the published credits include Football Stories, The Ups and Downs of the Premier League (Foul Football), Flaming Olympics 2008 with Quiz Book. A native of Forest Gate in the London Borough of Newham, Coleman has written nearly a hundred books, including fifteen titles in the Angels FC series and five titles, The Cure, Going Straight, The Snog Log, Tag and Weirdo's War for "10 and older" readers.

== Biography ==
Coleman was born in Forest Gate, a suburb in east London. Not long after he was born, his family moved a few miles east to Barking. At the time of his arrival, the area was just starting to recover from the damage it had received during World War II. He lived in a house on Bevan Avenue, named after Aneurin Bevan the architect of the National Health Service. He lived in that estate for 20 years. The area helped develop Coleman's love of sport due to the oblong shaped lanes of grass leading up the estate, which could be used as mini-stadiums. He pretended to play at various sporting events of the time, e.g. the Melbourne Olympics of 1956, the soccer Cup Final at Wembley Stadium, and the games at Lord's Cricket ground. He still has medals he won for being school champion in the 100m sprint and the long jump. As said by Coleman himself "My information series Foul Football tries to convey some of the magic I felt about the game of soccer by relating the weird and wonderful history of the game and the personalities it has seen over the years. On the fiction side, my series about a junior soccer team called Angels FC tries to bring out the humour and sheer fun that you’ll find at the heart of the game when it’s played by youngsters who don’t even know how to spell the word cynicism." Coleman had his first children's book published when he was 46 years of age. He has also said: "I didn't [want to become a writer] at first. I used to teach computer science at a university and my first book was a boring one about computers. I livened it up by putting a few jokes in. At the end I thought I'd try writing a few more things, but this time forgetting about the computers and concentrating on the jokes. After lots of failures I realised that youngsters enjoy jokes more than adults and started writing for them. Eighty books later, I'm still doing it...I write both fact and fiction. The Foul Football series are favourite fact books, simply because they're about football. On the fiction side, I'm just finishing a trilogy called The Bearkingdom. They're dark and scary, quite different to anything I've written before.

== Additional information ==
His favourite footballer is Trevor Brooking - having been neighbours with him and versing his a couple of times as a child. He has a wife and four children. His favourite team is West Ham. Apart from sport, his favourite subjects at school were Maths and Physics. His favourite author is Enid Blyton, and his favourite illustrators are those of the Roy of the Rovers comic strip in the Tiger magazine.

== List of publications ==
=== Picture books ===
- The Mum Who Was Made Of Money (Magi Publications)
- Lazy Ozzie (Magi Publications)
- Ridiculous! (Magi Publications)
- One, Two, Three, Oops! (Magi Publications)
- George and Sylvia: A Tale of True Love (Little Tiger Press)
- Hank The Clank (OUP)
- Hank Clanks Again (OUP)
- Hank Clanks Back (OUP)

=== Young fiction ===
- Fizzy Hits the Headlines (Orchard Books)
- Fizzy Steals the Show (Orchard Books)
- Fizzy TV Star (Orchard Books)
- Fizzy in the Spotlight (Orchard Books)

=== Angels FC series (all published by Orchard) ===
- Touchline Terror!
- Dirty Defending!
- Handball Horror!
- Gruesome Goalkeeping!
- Midfield Madness!
- Goal Greedy!
- Frightful Fouls!
- Dazzling Dribbling!
- Fearsome Free-Kicks!
- Awesome Attacking!
- Wicked Wingers!
- Shocking Shooting
- Suffering Substitutes!
- Crafty Coaching!

=== Junior fiction ===
- Triv in Pursuit (The Bodley Head and Red Fox)
- Gizzmo Lewis, Fairly Secret Agent (Random House and Red Fox)
- Lexy Boyd and the Spadewell Sparklers (Random House and Red Fox)
- Madame Retsmah Predicts (Scholastic Publications)
- Shoot, Dad! (Scholastic)
- Danger Signs (Barrington Stoke)
- Kuoktelėję kompiuteriai

=== The Bearkingdom Trilogy (Orchard Books) ===
- The Howling Tower
- The Fighting Pit
- The Hunting Forest

=== Older fiction ===
- Weirdo's War (Orchard Books); and as Barjo (Editions Rouergue, France)
- Tag (Orchard Books)
- Going Straight (Orchard Books); and as On The Run (USA), Filer Droit (Editions Rouergue, France)
- The Snog Log (Orchard Books and Marshall Cavendish, USA)
- The Cure (Orchard Books)

=== Non-Fiction (all Scholastic) ===
- Flaming Olympics
- Flaming Olympics Quiz Book
- Top Ten Bible Stories
- Top Ten Fairy Stories
- Crashing Computers

=== The Foul Football Series (Scholastic) ===
- Foul Football
- Wicked World Cup
- Furious Euros
- Come On, England!
- The Ups and Downs of the Premier League
- Phenomenal FA Cup
- Legendary Leagues
- Prize Players
- Triumphant Teams
- Even Fouler Football
- Ultimate Fan's handbook
- Kickin' Quiz Book
- The World Cup Quiz Book

=== Internet Detectives (Macmillan Children's Books) ===
- Net Bandits
- Escape Key
- Speed Surf
- Cyber Feud
- System Crash
- Web Trap
- Virus Attack (with Alan Frewin Jones)
- Access Denied (with Alan Frewin Jones)

=== Junior fiction written as 'Fiona Kelly' ===
- Mystery Kids 3: Treasure Hunt (Hodder Children's Books)
- Mystery Kids 6: Funny Money (Hodder Children's Books)
- Mystery Kids 9: Wrong Number (Hodder Children's Books)

=== Older fiction for low-reading-age children ===
- Double Trouble (Learning Development Aids)
- Grounds for Suspicion/Race against Time (10 minute thrillers) (Learning Development Aids)
- Thrilling Comprehension Support material for use with 5 & 10 minute Thrillers (Learning Development Aids)
