= Close to Home (Magee novel) =

2023 novel by Michael Magee

- Cover of the 2023 Hamish Hamilton edition
- Author: Michael Magee
- Language: English
- Publisher: Hamish Hamilton
- Publication date: May 16, 2023
- Pages: 280
- Awards: Nero
- ISBN: 9780241582978

Close to Home (2023) is the debut novel of Irish author Michael Magee. Set in 2013, it is a coming-of-age story that explores modern working-class masculinity, poverty, and the lingering generational trauma of "The Troubles" in post-conflict Belfast.

== Plot ==
Twenty-two-year-old Sean Maguire returns to Belfast after graduating with an English degree from a university in Liverpool. With no professional jobs available, Sean lives hand-to-mouth in a mouldy apartment with his friend Ryan, cheats supermarket self-checkouts for food, and works a dead-end job as a nightclub bartender. He quickly falls back into old routines of heavy drinking and drug-fueled weekend binges with his childhood friends.

At a house party, an exhausted and intoxicated Sean randomly assaults another young man named Daniel Jackson. Following his arrest, Sean loses his job, is evicted from his flat, and is sentenced to 200 hours of community service along with a heavy financial fine.

With nowhere else to go, Sean moves back in with his mother. He spends his days completing his community service by clearing overgrown graveyards. He witnesses his older half-brother, Anthony, struggle severely with alcoholism and the psychological aftermath of childhood abuse inflicted by Sean's father.

At times trying to avoid his old destructive habits, Sean reconnects with former girlfriend Mairéad, who has is now part of a cultured student crowd living in the south of the city. Sean feels both animosity and jealousy for that life he fathoms as just out of his reach. Mairéad's plans to escape to Berlin and work in the film industry and their honest friendship encourage Sean and he begins to distance himself from his turbulent social circle and slowly starts channelling his experiences into writing, seeking a way to move forward with his life in Belfast.

== Characters ==
=== Sean ===
Sean Maguire is the 22-year-old narrator of Close to Home. After studying English in Liverpool, he returns to a poor West Belfast community still affected by the Troubles. He feels trapped between his working-class roots and his university education, struggling to find a proper job. Sean is smart and observant and emphatetic, but he carries a lot of anger and shame about his background. To escape his reality, he turns to partying and drugs, even though he knows it ruins his future. He wants to improve his life but feels like the odds are against him. Sean's relationships clearly show his inner struggles through his own eyes. He views his loyal friend Ryan as a safe space where he feels understood, but this comfort ultimately keeps Sean trapped in his destructive partying habits. In contrast, Sean looks up to Mairéad as a role model; though he sometimes feels uncomfortable with her blunt honesty, her reality checks push him to stop wasting his talent and face his future. At home, Sean feels a heavy mix of love and guilt toward his mother, as he constantly watches her bear the painful weight of their family's poverty. Meanwhile, he looks at his older brother Anthony with deep affection but also fear, because Anthony's severe alcoholism serves as a terrifying warning of how easily their environment can break a person, showing Sean exactly what he might become if he gives up.

At first, Sean is passive and just lets bad things happen to him. However, getting into trouble with the law forces him into community service, which becomes a major turning point. He slows down, gets a steady job, and uses writing to process his feelings. By the end of the story, he hasn't solved all his problems, but he gains the self-awareness to stop hurting himself and finally move forward.

=== Mairéad ===
Mairéad is Sean's childhood sweetheart, whom he meets again in a nightclub at the beginning of the novel. Over the course of the story she evolves into his closest friend. She has a difficult relationship with her alcoholic mother and no contact with her father. Her time at Queen's University Belfast offers her the chance to surround herself with different people, who have a positive impact on her personal development. At the beginning of "Close to home" she works in a clothing shop and sells shots in nightclubs to earn enough money to fulfil her dream of moving to Berlin and starting a new life. After realising she can no longer live with her mother, Mairéad becomes homeless. She stays with various friends, sometimes feeling forced to enter romantic relationships with them to secure a place to stay. She lives with Sean for some time, sleeping with him once before clarifying she does not have romantic feelings for him. Later, when Sean is forced to move out of his apartment, Mairéad stays with a girl called Julia. The two start dating, but Mairéad later confirms her feelings for Julia weren't genuine. She maintained the relationship mainly because she needed somewhere to live. As soon as she has saved enough money, Mairéad moves to a flat in Berlin, hoping for a fresh start.

Mairéad is presented as a very confident, reliable and supportive character. She listens to Sean's problems and acts as a source of emotional support and perspective for him in moments such as his court appearance and his search for employment. She is well-liked by those around her and is determined to achieve her goals, particularly her ambition to move to Berlin. Furthermore, she is depicted as strong-willed and unafraid to state her opinion. However, Mairéad comes across as rather restless and somewhat indecisive. This is reflected in her unstable living situation and her uncertainty about whether she wants to move to Germany alone or with a friend. Sean describes her as someone for whom "whole years could go by without hearing a word from […], then she would appear out of nowhere and slip back into your life like no time had passed at all". For him, Mairéad acts as something of a role model, since they come from similar backgrounds, but respond differently to their circumstances. By actively seeking change and new opportunities, she serves as an inspiration to Sean.

=== Anthony Quinn ===
Anthony Quinn is Sean's older half-brother. He grew up in working-class West Belfast. Anthony had a difficult childhood, which was shaped by a transgenerational trauma. His father was abusive towards him, which left deep marks on his personality. As a result he often got into fights and struggled at school. He is known to be aggressive and loud, and finds it difficult to express his feelings in a healthy way. Instead, he shows his feeling through anger and aggression. Anthony has serious problems with alcohol and drugs, which he uses as a way to cope with stress and frustration. He also beats his wife, making him an abusive partner. Despite his chaotic behavior, Anthony loves Sean very deeply and tries to protect him. At the same time, Sean sees Anthony as a warning of what his own future could become, which makes their relationship complicated.

=== Mother of Sean ===
Another important character in the developing story of Sean is his mother. She cares deeply about her three sons, Gerard, Anthony and Sean, and would die for them if necessary. Although she wants them to live their best lives and stop spending money on life-threatening things like drugs, she doesn't take any action to prevent them from doing so.

This is because she has her own battles to fight and is still haunted by her own past. She grew up on the Falls, a Catholic neighbourhood, where she experienced The Troubles first-hand, alongside gunshots and terrible incidents. Consequently, she has developed anxiety around new, loud or overwhelming things. As a result, she tries to keep her daily routine as simple and consistent as possible, eating the same dinner every day — "fish fingers grilled in butter and salad if she's feeling fancy" — and following the same night routine. She has been in two toxic relationships with the fathers of Anthony, Gerard and Sean. She eventually left them to try and provide a better life for her children.

Nevertheless, she's barely getting by on the money she makes from cleaning other people's mansions. To cope with everything that has happened and the chaos in her life because of her sons, she escapes reality by painting pictures found on the internet and selling them to make a little extra money. Her best friend Mary helps her to change her view on life from time to time.

She's presented as a woman who hasn't let go of her past and struggles to live a "normal" life. Yet, despite of her own struggles, she worries about her sons and tries to help them as much as she can. Despite wanting a better life for her sons, she remains unable to confront her own past and the problems she has experienced, carrying a lot of emotional scars from it.

== Themes ==
Reviews emphasized the novel's portrayal of Belfast, which Kirkus described as a "bleak setting". The New York Times called it "a dark but illuminating portrait of Belfast, painted by a man who knows the lads, the bars, the bookstores and back alleys that litter his birthplace". Spectrum Culture says the novel "captured the way that economic hopelessness permeates generations and poisons an entire society as well as this one." The novel deals with "complex thems such as masculinity, trauma, and the impact of societal issues on personal lives." Especially the weight of the past is a pivotal part of the story. "The dead memorialized by murals that still dominate the lanes of Belfast" are a burden. The decades of violence, rebel tunes, and post-traumatic stressors have left Sean's generation with bleak prospects, and parents "sniffing glue", or going "to bed with a hammer."

== Style ==
The novel is written in the first person. The New York Times writes, "By presenting dialogue without quotation marks and employing single-line, staccato paragraphs, Magee's yarn unspools like a story told over a couple of pints." What characterizes the style of Close to Home are unpunctuated dialogue sections that flow directly into the prose.

== Publication and reception ==
Close to Home was published by Hamish Hamilton in 2023. It won the Rooney Prize and the Nero Book Award for debut fiction. It was reviewed favorably in The New York Times, where Eli Cranor described it as "universal" and wrote that "Magee's yarn unspools like a story told over a couple of pints", in The Guardian, where Keiran Goddard called it "a genuinely necessary book" and praised its "staggeringly humane and tender" portrayal of class and belonging, Spectrum Culture, and Kirkus, which described it as "an impressive coming-of-age tale enriched by its bleak setting". "His exploration of family life, friendship and modern masculinity has a poignancy and sharp sense of place that marks him out as a writer to watch." writes Cathy Brown.
