= William Blight =

British Royal Navy captain

Captain William Blight
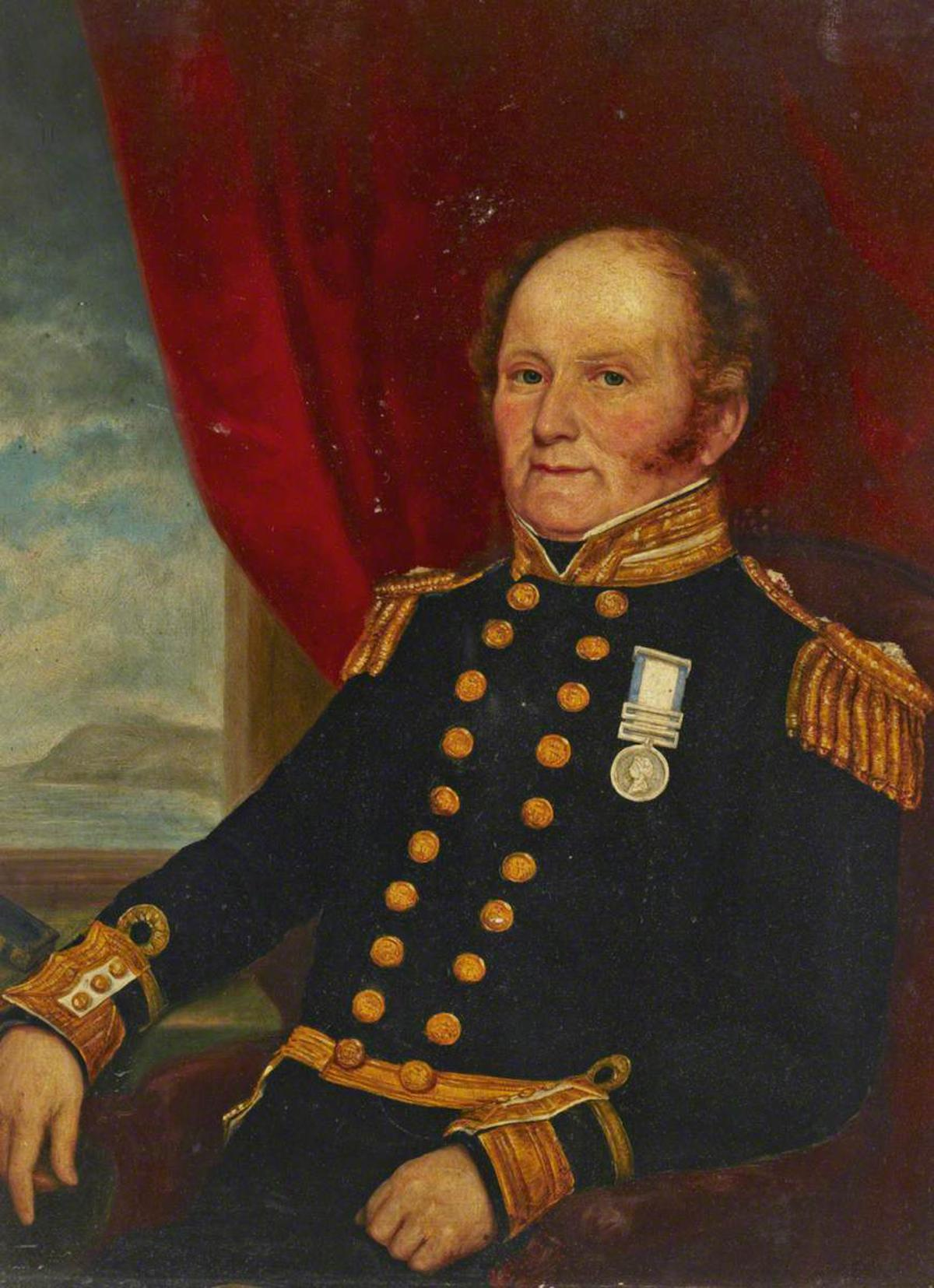
- Born: 1785
- Died: 22 July 1862 (aged 76–77)
- Occupation: Royal Navy captain

William Blight (1785 – 22 July 1862) was a British Royal Navy captain.

== Biography ==
Blight was entered 9 May 1793, as a volunteer on board the Intrepid, 64 guns, under the command of Captain the Hon. Charles Carpenter. In that ship he continued as midshipman, masters mate, and acting lieutenant, most of the time in the East and West Indies, until confirmed as lieutenant, 15 April 1803, and appointed to the Britannia of 100 guns, with Captain, and afterwards Rear-admiral, the Earl of Northesk. In the Britannia he had his share in the glory of Trafalgar, and was sent to take possession of the French Aigle of 74 guns, which was lost in the gale immediately after the battle. Blight, however, was fortunately rescued in time, and in the spring of 1806 followed Lord Northesk into the Dreadnought. In August 1806 he was appointed to the Néréide, 36 guns, with Captain Robert Corbet, and served in the attack on Buenos Ayres July 1807. The Néréide afterwards went to the East Indies, and in February 1809, when Captain Corbet was tried for cruelty, Blight, then first lieutenant, was the principal witness in defence. He was afterwards, 1812–14, agent for transports at Palermo; in 1819-21 first lieutenant of the Queen Charlotte, flagship at Portsmouth; and 12 February 1821 was promoted to the rank of commander. In May 1828 he was appointed to the Britannia, carrying the flag of Lord Northesk as commander-in-chief at Plymouth, from which he was transferred to the St. Vincent, and was posted from her on 22 July 1830. He held no further appointment in the navy, and retired with the rank of rear-admiral 27 September 1855. He died 22 July 1862.
