= The Carer (novel) =

English novel by Deborah Moggach

- First edition
- Author: Deborah Moggach
- Language: English
- Publisher: Tinder Press
- Publication date: 2019
- Publication place: United Kingdom
- Media type: Print

The Carer is a novel by English author Deborah Moggach published in 2019, exploring the care of the elderly.

== Inspiration ==
Moggach describes her experiences with caregivers who helped look after her own mother:

I became very close to them, I was very, very grateful that they were doing the work that I wasn’t prepared to do... I was also slightly jealous that my mother seemed to prefer their company more than mine.

It was a very complicated and interesting relationship. Because you re-examine stuff, you start to question the whole relationship and the mother becomes, because one’s parent becomes like a child and dependent, it not only brings out the stuff from the past, but it turns the whole thing upside down because you start to look after them – or in this case look after them but also get someone else to do the dirty work.

== Plot ==
Phoebe and Robert's father, James a widower has broken his hip and needs full time care. The sixty-something siblings argue about who should visit him in times of crises. After unsuitable carers, Mandy seemed to be ideal, but gradually the siblings feel suspicious about her. Within weeks Mandy has inveigled her way into their father’s affections: calling him pet names, taking him on outings he would not previously have enjoyed and taking an apparently unhealthy interest in his personal paperwork...

== Reception ==
- Hannah Beckerman in The Guardian praises the novel:"Moggach astutely conveys the complex emotional and transactional dynamics of outsourcing the care of a loved one. And yet when the revelation about Mandy’s true motivation is delivered, a third of the way into the story, it is unexpected. Moggach successfully subverts our expectations, taking the novel into unforeseen territory, exploring themes of desire, expectation and the ownership of collective family history."
- Kate Saunders in The Times says "Deborah Moggach addresses this all too common modern nightmare with ruthless honesty and sublime wit — The Carer is among the funniest novels I have read for ages. Moggach is one of the very few writers (like Posy Simmonds and Howard Jacobson) with an unfailing eye for middle-class absurdity...The Carer is truthful and often moving with joyous flashes of comedy. I have already cast the inevitable film."
- Alastair Mabbott in The Herald is also positive "it’s an absorbing, bittersweet novel with an irrepressible thread of sly satirical comedy running through it. Moggach seems to be having the most fun when portraying the contemporary rural world in which her characters live. Moggach does tongue-in-cheek with such firm conviction that one just goes along with it."
- Brian Martin in The Spectator writes "this extremely clever novel consists of many plot twists and turns. Its narrative devices constantly urge us on to the denouement — ‘but then something happened that changed it all’; ‘he was going to find out in the weeks ahead’"..."It’s this that Moggach tells with insight, acute observation of character and mordant humour."
