= Hazel Townson =

English author

- Townson, circa 1970
- Born: 12 April 1928; Nelson, Lancashire, England
- Died: 11 October 2010 (aged 82)
- Occupation: Author
- Writing career
- Genre: Children's

Hazel Townson (12 April 1928 – 11 October 2010) was an English children's-literature author. She had over seventy books published from 1975 onwards, including in countries such as the Netherlands, Spain, France and Japan.

Townson released three series of books: The Lenny and Jake series (between 1981 and 1997), Tiger Young Readers' series (1989–1992) and The Speckled Panic series (1982–1995). Her final release, two years before her death in 2010, was Deathwood Damian Strikes Again.

== Career ==
Hazel Townson began her writing career with Punch magazine, for which she was a regular contributor for many years. The magazine invited her to write reviews of children's books, which would eventually lead to her writing her own material. She also worked as Chief Assistant Librarian for part of Greater Manchester, a role that included responsibility for libraries in 110 schools, eleven public children's libraries, and four colleges.

Her first book, entitled Looking for Lossie, was published in 1975. By 1998, Townson published books totalled 55. These ranged from picture books to teenage novels. Some of Townson's books, such as The Speckled Panic and Terrible Tuesday, have been adapted for television. She also had stories commissioned for Granada Television's Time for a Story, Tickle on the Tum and Story World programmes.

In an article for Books for Keeps, Townson wrote: "I've been lucky with my illustrators. For instance, Philippe Dupasquier and Tony Ross both have the exact measure of childhood, felicitous touches of humour and an apparently total recall of their own early days. Each of their illustrations can be dwelt upon lovingly to extract from it more and more delicious detail—such as one of Tony Ross's illustrations for Terrible Tuesday, which shows gunmen threatening a bank manager on the steps of his bank. Not only does the bank manager have his hands up in surrender, but also the passing baby in its pram and the statue in the road outside. Even a dog has raised its front paws, and the birds their wings."

She frequently visited schools, libraries, colleges and writers' groups to talk about children's literature and to assist with creative writing. Following its formation in 1985, Townson chaired the panel for the annual "Lancashire Children's Book of the Year" award.

In 2005, Virgin Atlantic selected her most-recent book The Adventures of a Lottery Winner for inclusion in around 50,000 children's on-board goodie bags.

== Personal life ==
Born in Nelson, Lancashire, Townson was brought up in the Pendle valley. She attended Accrington High School and then studied English at the University of Leeds. She was married to Kenneth Smith; they had two children. Townson died on 11 October 2010, aged 82, of Alzheimer's disease. She had been living in Prestwich Hills, Greater Manchester.

== Bibliography ==
=== The Lenny and Jake series ===
- The Great Ice-Cream Crime (1981)
- The Siege of Cobb Street School (1983)
- The Vanishing Gran (1983)
- Haunted Ivy (1984)
- The Crimson Crescent (1986)
- The Staggering Snowman (1987)
- Fireworks Galore! (1988)
- Walnut Whirl (1989)
- Hopping Mad (1991)
- The Kidnap Report (1992)
- A Night on Smugglers' Island (1993)
- The Sign of the Crab (1994)
- Cats and Burglars (1995)
- The Clue of the Missing Cuff-link (1996)
- Trouble on the Train (1997)

=== Tiger Young Readers' series ===
- Through the Witch's Window (1989)
- Amos Shrike, the School Ghost (1990)
- Snakes Alive (1991)
- Blue Magic (1992)

=== The Speckled Panic series ===
- The Speckled Panic (1982)
- The Choking Peril (1985)
- Hot Stuff (1991)
- The One-Day Millionaires (1995)
- Coughdrop Calamity (1995)

=== Picture books ===
- The Clatterbang Clock (1985)
- Present Time (1985)
- Terrible Tuesday (1985)
- What on Earth...? (1990)

=== Other titles ===
- Looking for Lossie (1975)
- Walk over My Grave (1981)
- The Witch's Daughter (1982)
- The Mop with a Mind of its Own (1984)
- The Shrieking Face (1984)
- A Wakeful Night (1986)
- Two of a Kind (Time for a Story) (1986)
- Danny - Don't Jump (1987)
- Pilkie's Progress (1988)
- Gary Who? (1989)
- Toffee Tina (1989)
- The Barley Sugar Ghosts (1990)
- The Moving Statue (1990)
- The Secret of Celia (1993)
- Disaster Bag (1994)
- Who's Afraid of the Evil Eye (1994)
- Charlie the Champion Liar (1994)
- Charlie the Champion Traveller (1995)
- Rumpus on the Roof (1995)
- One Green Bottle (1995)
- The Peckthorn Monster (1995)
- Victor's Party (1995)
- Charlie's Champion Chase (1997)
- Chain of Fear (1998)
- The Tale of the Terrible Teeth (1998)
- The Armband Band (1998)
- Boy Missing (1999)
- Trouble Doubled (2000)
- The Magic Pen (2001)
- Lift Off (2002)
- The Deathwood Letters (2003)
- Two Weird Weeks (2003)
- Your Dad, My Mum (2001)
- Ignorance is Bliss (2001)
- The Invisible Boy (2002)
- Diamond Hunt (2003)
- The Adventures of a Lottery Winner (2004)
- Shots in the Dark (2004)
- The Secret Room (2004)
- Snakes Alive! and Other Stories (2005)
- Dark Deeds at Deathwood: Deathwood Letters 2 (2006)
- On the Run (2006)
- Vanishing Village (2007)
- Deathwood Damian Strikes Again (2008)
