= Seesaw (Moggach novel) =

1996 novel by Deborah Moggach

- First edition
- Author: Deborah Moggach
- Language: English
- Publisher: Heinemann
- Publication date: 11 Mar 1996
- Publication place: United Kingdom
- Media type: Print & Audio
- Pages: 320
- ISBN: 0-434-00312-3

Seesaw, is a 1996 novel by English author Deborah Moggach, first published in 1996 by Heinemann and recommended in OUP's Good Fiction Guide.

== Plot introduction ==
Hannah, the seventeen-year-old daughter of upper middle class Morris and Val Price, is kidnapped with a half-million-pound ransom. The novel focuses on both the Price family and the kidnappers in the time leading up to the abduction. The book also focuses on the relationships between Jon and Eva, the two kidnappers, and Hannah as well as what happens to all characters following her release.

== Television adaptation ==
Deborah Moggach also wrote the script for a three-part television adaptation of the novel, first broadcast in March 1998 on ITV.
