= Anne Fine =

British children's and adult writer (born 1947)

Anne Fine OBE FRSL
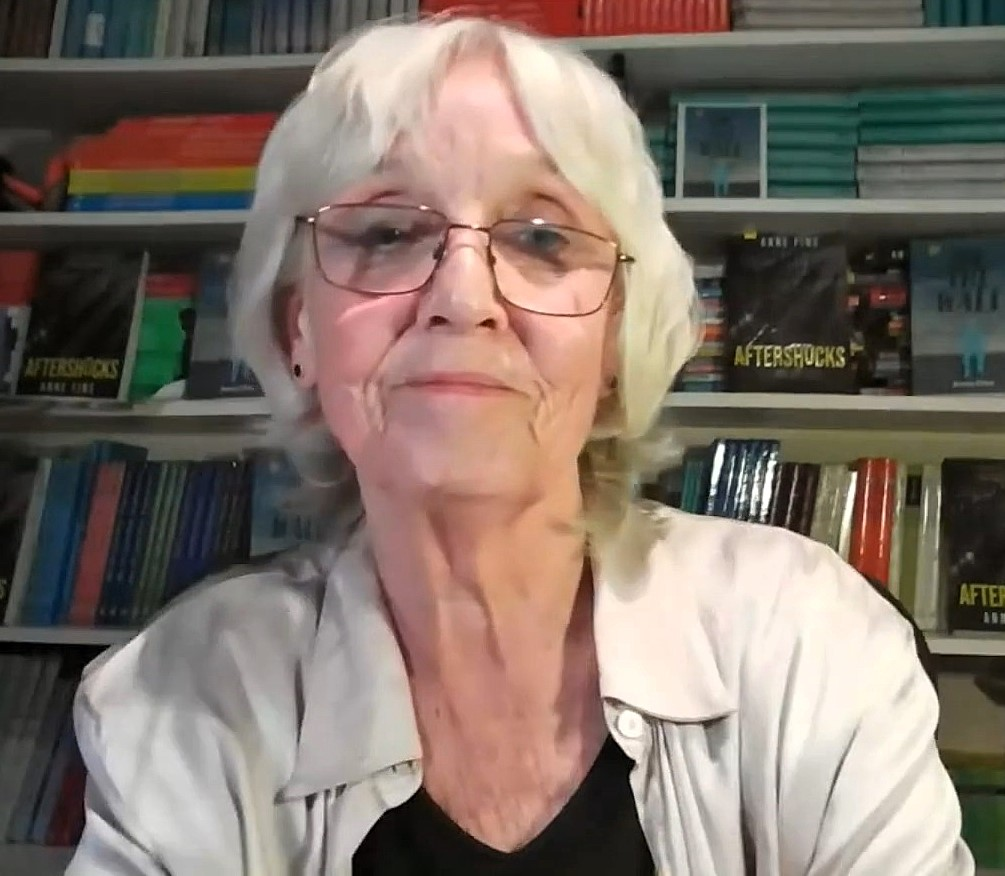
- Fine in 2024
- Born: 7 December 1947 (age 78); Leicester, Leicestershire, England
- Education: University of Warwick
- Occupation: Writer
- Spouse: Kit Fine (divorced)
- Partner: Dick Warren
- Children: Cordelia Fine; Ione Fine
- Writing career
- Period: 1978–present
- Genres: Children's literature (all ages), black comedy
- Notable works: Madame Doubtfire; Goggle-Eyes; Flour Babies
- Notable awards: Carnegie Medal; 1989, 1992; Guardian Prize; 1990
- Website: www.annefine.co.uk

Anne Fine (born 7 December 1947) is an English writer. She is best known for writing children's books, although she also writes for adults. She is a Fellow of the Royal Society of Literature and she was appointed an OBE in 2003.

Fine has written more than seventy children's books, including two winners of the annual Carnegie Medal and three highly commended runners-up. (Note: Today there are usually eight books on the Carnegie shortlist. CCSU lists 32 "Highly Commended" runners-up for the Carnegie Medal from 1966 to 2002 but only three before 1979 when the distinction became approximately annual. There were 29 "HC" books in 24 years including two in 1989 and one each in 1996 and 2002. (The "Commended" distinction was used about 135 times from 1954 to 2002.) • No one has won three Carnegies. Among the seven authors with two Medals, six were active during 1966–2002 and all wrote at least one highly commended runner-up, led by Anne Fine with three.) For some of those five books she also won the Guardian Prize, one Smarties Prize, two Whitbread Awards, and she was twice the Children's Author of the Year. Her book Madame Doubtfire (1987) was adapted into Mrs. Doubtfire, the second-best grossing American feature film of 1993.

For her contribution as a children's writer, Fine was a runner-up for the Hans Christian Andersen Medal in 1998. From 2001 to 2003, she was the second Children's Laureate in the UK.

== Early life ==
Fine was born and raised in Leicester and educated in neighbouring midland counties of England. She attended Northampton High School and earned a degree in politics from the University of Warwick. She was married to the philosopher Kit Fine until they were divorced and have two daughters named Cordelia Fine and Ione Fine. She has now been with her partner Dick Warren for more than twenty years. She currently lives in Barnard Castle, County Durham, England.

She has four sisters; her father was an electrical engineer and she grew up in Fareham, Hampshire. The eldest of the sisters is Elizabeth Arnold who also writes books for children; the three younger sisters were triplets. She studied History and Politics at university. At age 24, she wrote her first book.

== Career ==
Describing the start of her writing career, Fine has written: "In 1971 my first daughter was born. Unable to get to the library in a snowstorm to change my library books, in desperation I sat down and started to write a novel. Clearly this was the right job for me, for I have never stopped writing for more than a few weeks since". In September 2010, Fine told The Daily Telegraph's Jessica Salter that this first book lay under her bed after being rejected by two publishers, adding "Five years later I unearthed it and entered it in a competition where I was runner-up, and it was finally published in 1978".

Her books for older children include Madame Doubtfire (1987), a satirical novel that Twentieth Century Fox filmed as Mrs. Doubtfire, starring Robin Williams. Goggle-Eyes (Hamish Hamilton, 1989) was adapted for television by Deborah Hall for the BBC.

Her books for middle children include Bill's New Frock (Methuen, 1989) and How to Write Really Badly (1996).

Her work has been translated into 45 languages.

In March 2014, Fine lent her support to the campaign Let Books Be Books, which aims to persuade publishers of children's books to stop labelling and promoting books as "for boys" or "for girls". She told UK newspaper The Guardian: "You'd think this battle would have been won decades ago. But even some seemingly bright and observant adults are buying into it again […] There are girls of all sorts, with all interests, and boys of all sorts with all interests. Just meeting a few children should make that obvious enough. But no, these idiotic notions are spouted so often they become a self-fulfilling societal straitjacket from which all our children suffer".

== Awards and nominations ==
The biennial Hans Christian Andersen Award conferred by the International Board on Books for Young People is the highest recognition available to a writer or illustrator of children's books. In 1998, Fine was one of five finalists for the writing award.

She won the 1989 Carnegie Medal from the Library Association, recognising Goggle-Eyes as that year's best children's book, and she was one of two highly commended runners-up for the same Medal with Bill's New Frock. She also won the once-in-a-lifetime Guardian Prize for Goggle-Eyes and the Smarties Prize in ages category 6–8 years for Bill's New Frock.

Three years later, she won the Carnegie Medal again for Flour Babies (Hamilton, 1992), which was also named the Whitbread Children's Book of the Year. The Tulip Touch (Hamilton, 1996) was her second Whitbread winner and her second highly commended for the Carnegie.

Up on Cloud Nine (Doubleday, 2002) was the last highly commended Carnegie runner-up, a distinction then used 29 times in 24 years. Fine is one of seven authors to win two Carnegie Medals (1936–2012) and the only author of three Highly Commended books.

Fine was the second Children's Laureate (2001–03) and received the OBE for services to literature in the 2003 Queen's Birthday Honours List.

=== Awards ===
- 1989 Carnegie Medal – Goggle-Eyes
- 1990 Guardian Children's Fiction Prize – Goggle-Eyes
- 1990 Nestlé Smarties Book Prize, ages 6–8 – Bill's New Frock
- 1990 Children's Author of the Year Award, Publishing News
- 1991 Children's Author of the Year, British Book Awards
- 1992 Carnegie Medal – Flour Babies
- 1993 Whitbread Award, Children's Book – Flour Babies
- 1993 Children's Author of the Year Award, Publishing News
- 1994 Children's Author of the Year, British Book Awards
- 1996 Whitbread Award, Children's Book – The Tulip Touch
- 1998 Prix Sorcières, best children's book translated into French – Journal d'un chat assassin (Diary of a Killer Cat)

=== Runners-up, nominations, etc. ===
- 1984 Guardian shortlist – The Granny Project
- 1987 Guardian shortlist – Madame Doubtfire
- 1987 Whitbread shortlist – Madame Doubtfire
- 1989 Carnegie, highly commended – Bill's New Frock
- 1993 Carnegie shortlist – The Angel of Nitshill Road
- 1996 Carnegie, highly commended – Tulip Touch
- 2002 Carnegie, highly commended – Up on Cloud Nine
- 2004 shortlist for the Red House Children's Book Award, Younger Readers – The More The Merrier
- 2006 Carnegie shortlist – The Road of Bones
- 2007 Nestlé Smarties Book Prize, ages 6–8, second place – Ivan the Terrible
- 2014 Carnegie shortlist – Blood Family

== Selected works ==
=== Picture books ===
- Poor Monty (1991) ISBN 1-4052-1097-4
- Ruggles (2001, ISBN 0-86264-895-5), illustrated by Ruth Brown
- Big Red Balloon (2012)
- Hole in the Road (2014)
- Under the Bed (2015)

=== For younger children ===
- Scaredy-Cat (1985) ISBN 1-4052-0251-3
- Stranger Danger? (1989, ISBN 0-14-130913-X), illus. Jean Baylis
- Only a Show (1990, ISBN 0-14-038843-5), illus. Valerie Littlewood
- The Worst Child I Ever Had (1991, ISBN 0-14-034799-2), illus. Clara Vullianny
- Design a Pram (1991, ISBN 1-4052-0137-1), illus. P. Dupasquier
- The Same Old Story Every Year (1992, ISBN 0-14-130275-5), illus. Vanessa Julian-Ottie
- The Haunting of Pip Parker (1992) ISBN 0-7445-8294-6
- Press Play (1994, ISBN 1-4052-0185-1), illus. Terry McKenna
- The Diary of a Killer Cat (1994, ISBN 0-14-036931-7), illus. Steve Cox —in French translation, winner of the 1998 Prix Sorcières
- Care of Henry (1996, ISBN 0-7445-8270-9), illus. Paul Howard
- Jennifer's Diary (1996, ISBN 0-14-038060-4), illus. Kate Aldous
- Countdown (1996, ISBN 0-7497-4672-6), illus. David Higham
- Roll Over Roly (1999, ISBN 0-14-131504-0), illus. P. Dupasquier
- Notso Hotso (2001) ISBN 0-241-14138-9
- The Jamie and Angus Stories (2002, ISBN 0-7445-5965-0), illus. Penny Dale
- A Shame to Miss 1: Perfect poems for young readers, selected by Anne Fine (2002) ISBN 0-552-54867-7 —anthology
- How to Cross the Road and Not Turn into a Pizza (2002, ISBN 0-7445-9001-9), illus. Tony Ross
- The Return of the Killer Cat (2003) ISBN 0-14-131719-1
- Nag Club (2004) ISBN 0-7445-9796-X
- It Moved! (2006) ISBN 1-4063-0013-6
- Jamie and Angus Together (2007), illus. Penny Dale
- The Killer Cat Strikes Back (2007)
- The Killer Cat's Birthday Bash (2008)
- Jamie and Angus Forever (2009), illus. Penny Dale
- Under a Silver Moon (2012)
- Out for the Count (2016)

=== For middle children ===
- Anneli the Art Hater (1986) ISBN 1-4052-0186-X
- A Pack of Liars (1988) ISBN 0-14-032954-4
- Crummy Mummy and Me (1988, ISBN 0-14-032876-9), illus. David Higham
- A Sudden Puff of Glittering Smoke (1989)
- A Sudden Swirl of Icy Wind (1990)
- A Sudden Glow of Gold (1991)
  The three "Sudden" books were reissued as one, Genie, Genie, Genie (2004) ISBN 1-4052-1202-0.
- The Country Pancake (1989, ISBN 1-4052-0062-6), illus. Philippe Dupasquier – also published as Saving Miss Mirabelle
- Bill's New Frock (1989, ISBN 1-4052-0060-X), illus. P. Dupasquier —winner of the Smarties Prize, ages 6–8
- The Chicken Gave It To Me (1992, ISBN 1-4052-0078-2), illus. P. Dupasquier
- The Angel of Nitshill Road (1993, ISBN 1-4052-0184-3), illus. P. Dupasquier
- How To Write Really Badly (1996, ISBN 1-4052-0061-8), illus. P. Dupasquier
- Loudmouth Louis (1998, ISBN 0-14-130205-4), illus, Kate Aldous
- Charm School (1999, ISBN 0-440-86400-3), illus. Ros Asquith
- Telling Tales (Interview/Autobiography) (1999) ISBN 1-4052-0053-7
- Bad Dreams (2000) ISBN 0-440-86424-0
- A Shame to Miss 2: Ideal poems for middle readers, selected by Anne Fine (2002) ISBN 0-552-54868-5 —anthology
- The More the Merrier (2003) ISBN 0-440-86585-9; in the US, The True Story of Christmas
- Frozen Billy (2004) ISBN 0-385-60769-5
- Ivan the Terrible (2007) ISBN 1-4052-3324-9
- Eating Things on Sticks (2010)
- Trouble in Toadpool (2012)
- On Planet Fruitcake (2013)
- Aftershocks (2022)
- On the Wall (2024)

=== For older children ===
- The Summer-House Loon (Methuen, 1978) (Note: Anne Fine's first two books, The Summer-House Loon and The Other Darker Ned, published by Methuen Children's Books in 1978 and 1979, were updated, linked by new text, and published by Corgi Children's Books in 2006 under the title On The Summerhouse Steps.)
- The Other Darker Ned (1979)
- The Stone Menagerie (1980) ISBN 0-7497-4603-3
- Round Behind the Ice-House (1981) ISBN 0-14-037363-2
- The Granny Project (1983) ISBN 0-7497-4832-X
- Madame Doubtfire (1987) ISBN 0-14-037355-1; in the US, Alias Madame Doubtfire
- Goggle-Eyes (1989) ISBN 0-14-034071-8; in the US, My War with Goggle-Eyes —winner of the Carnegie Medal and Guardian Prize
- The Book of the Banshee (1991) ISBN 0-14-034704-6
- Flour Babies (1992) ISBN 0-14-036147-2 —winner of the Carnegie Medal and Whitbread Award
- Step by Wicked Step (1995) ISBN 0-14-036647-4
- The Tulip Touch (1996) ISBN 0-14-037808-1 —winner of the Whitbread Award
- Very Different (2001) ISBN 0-7497-4370-0 —short story collection
- Up on Cloud Nine (2002) ISBN 0-385-60372-X
- A Shame to Miss 3: Irresistible poetry for young adults, selected by Anne Fine (2002) ISBN 0-552-54869-3 —anthology
- On the Summerhouse Steps (2006, ISBN 0-552-55269-0)
- The Road of Bones (2006) ISBN 0-385-61063-7
- Fly in the Ointment (2008) ISBN 978-0-552-77467-3
- The Devil Walks (2011)
- Blood Family (2013) –shortlisted for the Carnegie Medal
- Blue Moon Day (2014) –short story collection
- Shades of Scarlet (2021) ISBN 9781788451352

=== For adults ===
- The Killjoy (1986) ISBN 0-14-023842-5
- In Cold Domain (1994) ISBN 0-670-85609-6
- Taking the Devil's Advice (1990) ISBN 0-670-83191-3
- Telling Liddy (1998) ISBN 0-593-04235-2
- All Bones and Lies (2001) ISBN 0-593-04725-7
- Raking the Ashes (2005) ISBN 0-593-05412-1
- Our Precious Lulu (2009) ISBN 0-593-06361-9
- "Walk on Water, Walk on Air", Sunday Times, 18 January 2009 (online edition)

== Notes ==
Cultural offices
Preceded by Quentin Blake	Children's Laureate of the United Kingdom; 2001–2003	Succeeded by Michael Morpurgo
