= Deborah Moggach =

English playwright, novelist and screenwriter (born 1948)

Deborah Moggach OBE FRSL
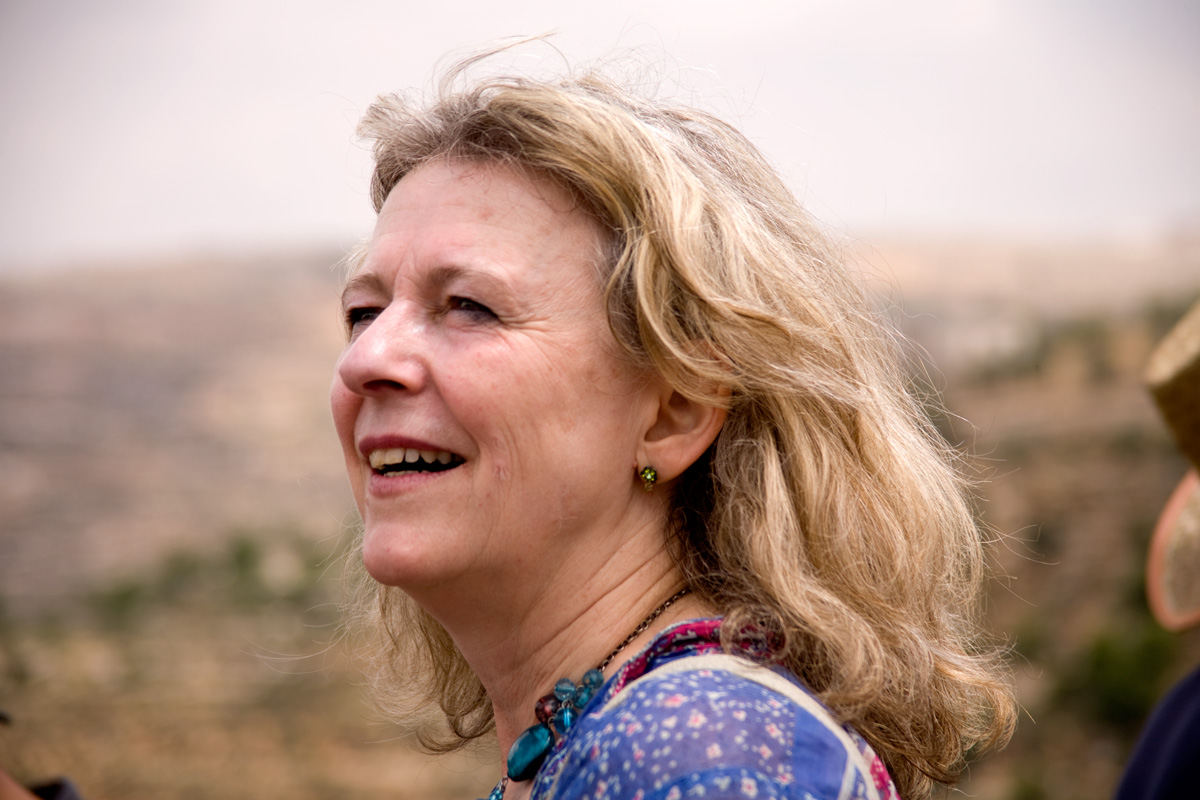
- Moggach in 2009
- Born: Deborah Hough; 28 June 1948 (age 78); Middlesex, England
- Education: University of Bristol
- Occupations: Playwright, novelist, screenwriter
- Writing career
- Genres: Contemporary, historical
- Website: www.deborahmoggach.com

Deborah Moggach OBE FRSL (née Hough; born 28 June 1948) is an English playwright, novelist and screenwriter. She has written nineteen novels, including The Ex-Wives (1993), Tulip Fever (1999; made into the 2017 film of the same name), These Foolish Things (2004; made into the 2011 film The Best Exotic Marigold Hotel) and Heartbreak Hotel (2013). Her film scripts include Pride and Prejudice (2005).

== Early life and career ==
Moggach is one of four daughters of writers Charlotte Hough (née Woodyadd) and Richard Hough. Moggach was brought up in Bushey, Hertfordshire, and St John's Wood in London, and was educated at Camden School for Girls and Queen's College, London.

She graduated from the University of Bristol in 1971 with a degree in English, and then trained as a teacher before going to work at Oxford University Press. She lived in Pakistan for two years in the mid-1970s and in the United States.

== Original works ==
Most of her novels are contemporary, tackling family life, divorce, children and the confusions and disappointments of relationships. She has an ear for comedy but has also written a dark thriller set in America, The Stand-In (1991); a bleak story of incest set near London Heathrow Airport, Porky (1983); and a novel pitting Muslim versus English family values, Stolen (1990).

Her two historical novels are Tulip Fever (1999), set in Vermeer’s Amsterdam, and In The Dark (2007), set in a boarding house during the First World War. Her 2015 novel, Something to Hide, is set in Texas, London, Beijing, and West Africa. The Indian subcontinent has featured frequently in her work.

Her other work includes two collections of short stories and a stage play.

== Adaptations for film and TV ==
=== By Moggach ===
She has adapted many of her novels as TV dramas.

She has written acclaimed adaptations of other people's work, including

- Nancy Mitford's Love in a Cold Climate
- The Diary of Anne Frank.
- Pride and Prejudice (2005), starring Keira Knightley, for which she was nominated for a BAFTA award,
- Goggle-Eyes, from Anne Fine's novel, which won a Writers Guild Award.

=== By other writers of Moggach works ===
Other writers have adapted novels by Moggach, including

- These Foolish Things, her comic novel about elderly people moving to India to obtain affordable care, was made into the successful film The Best Exotic Marigold Hotel.
- Tulip Fever was made into a film.

== Honours ==
In 2005, she was awarded an honorary doctorate by the University of Bristol; she is a Fellow of the Royal Society of Literature, a former Chair of the Society of Authors and was on the executive committee of English PEN. She was appointed Officer of the Order of the British Empire (OBE) in the 2018 New Year Honours for services to literature.

== Personal life ==
At Oxford University Press, she met the man who became her first husband, Tony Moggach; the couple later divorced. He died in November 2015.

For ten years, her partner was the cartoonist Mel Calman.

After Calman's death in 1994, she lived for seven years with Hungarian painter Csaba Pásztor.

From 2013-2021 she was married to Mark Williams, a journalist, editor and magazine publisher. They lived in the Welsh border town of Presteigne, and also had a maisonette in Kentish Town, north London.

She has two adult children: Tom, a teacher, and Lottie, a journalist and novelist.

In 1985, Moggach's mother was sent to prison for helping a terminally ill friend kill herself. Moggach is a patron of Dignity in Dying and campaigns for a change in the law on assisted suicide.

=== Habits ===
Moggach writes for 3 hours every morning, and smokes 3 roll-up cigarettes per day.

== Works ==
=== Novels ===
- You Must Be Sisters (1978)
- Close to Home (1979)
- A Quiet Drink (1980)
- Hot Water Man (1982)
- Porky (1983)
- To Have and to Hold (1986)
- Driving in the Dark (1988)
- Stolen (1990)
- The Stand-In (1991)
- The Ex-Wives (1993)
- Seesaw (1996)
- Close Relations (1997)
- Tulip Fever (1999)
- Final Demand (2001)
- These Foolish Things (2004) (was adapted into the movie The Best Exotic Marigold Hotel)
  - Also available as a "movie tie-in" book, with the same title as the movie.
- In the Dark (2007)
- Heartbreak Hotel (2013)
- Something to Hide (2015)
- The Carer (2019)
- The Black Dress (2021)

=== Short story collections ===
- Smile and Other Stories (1987)
- Changing Babies and Other Stories (1995)

=== Screenplays ===
- Pride & Prejudice (2005)
- Tulip Fever (2017)

=== Teleplays ===
- To Have and to Hold (mini-series) (1986)
- Goggle Eyes (adaptation of an Anne Fine novel) (1993) (winner of a Writers' Guild Award for Best Adapted TV Serial)
- Seesaw (adaptation of her own novel) (1998)
- Close Relations (adaptation of her own novel) (1999)
- Love in a Cold Climate (adaptation of two Nancy Mitford novels) (2001)
- Final Demand (adaptation of her own novel) (2003)
- The Diary of Anne Frank (2009)
- Stolen (adapted from her own novel) (1991)

=== Stage play ===
- Double-Take
- The Best Exotic Marigold Hotel (based on her novel These Foolish Things)

== See also ==
- List of British playwrights since 1950
