= Conrad Heighton Leigh =

English painter

Conrad Heighton Leigh (27 May 1883 – 20 March 1958) was an English artist, illustrator and member of Brighton Arts Club.

== Life and work ==
Conrad Leigh was born in Brighton, Sussex. His father was Thomas Leigh M.R.C.P.S., L.R.C.P. a surgeon. He attended Rostellan House School, Brighton and the Old Brighton Grammar School before studying at the Brighton school of art (much later merged into Brighton University) under William H. Bond (1861–1918) He went on to study at the Slade School of Art in London and the Académie Julian in Paris. He is particularly well known for his sporting and military subjects, many of which were used as illustrations for books, periodicals and popular postcards in the early half of the 20th century. His work featured regularly in the Strand Magazine, The Daily Mirror, Wide World and the Windsor Magazine.

During the first decade of the 20th century Conrad Leigh was commissioned to paint a panel for the luncheon room at the Hall of the Carpenters' Company in London Wall, a livery company of the City of London. The hall was completely burnt out during an air raid of 10 May 1941, when a gas main in London wall ignited, however most of the pictures survived. In 1915 Leigh was commissioned by the wallpaper manufacturers John Gilkes and Sons to provide designs for their wallpaper range and additionally designed their celebrated promotion poster in 1920 which has been reproduced and is retailed by many modern print and poster stores. The original period 1920 printing is highly sought after and exchanges hands for hundreds of pounds sterling. A further celebrated poster was designed by Leigh for the Brighton Carnival (24 June to 1 July c.1920s, actual year is unknown), again this poster has been recently reproduced and retailed in print and poster stores. Conrad Leigh worked at 68 Grand Parade, Brighton, now the site of the Brighton University The Faculty of Arts and Architecture.

He died in Brighton in 1958.

== Collections ==
Brighton University (Aldrich Collection); Hull Museums Collections.

== Partial bibliography ==
Illustrations for Books:

- The Young Buglers: A Tale of the Peninsular War (1910) (written by George Alfred Henty)
- The Strand Magazine (Jan-Jun 1928) (Published by George Newnes)
- The Windsor Magazine (1939)
- Sara Sat-Upon At School (1927) (written by Marjory Royce and Celia Damon)
- Nuts and Crackers (1914) (written by C. M. Masterman)
- King Edward VII: His Life & Reign; the Record of a Noble Career (1910) (written by Edgar Sanderson and Lewis Saul Benjamin)
- Nelson's Jolly Book for Girls (c.1930) (eds. Edwin Chisholm)
- Herbert Strang's Annual Volume 3 (1910)
- Blackie's Girl Annual (1928)
- Blackie's Girl Annual (1923)
- Love Among The Ruins (1934) (written by Warwick Deeping)
- Pan: A Journal For Saints and Cynics (1920)
- London Lavender (1927) (written by E. V. Lucas)
- The Story Of An African Farm (1914) (written by Olive Schreiner)
- John Gilkes and Sons Wallpapers and Decorations (1915) (pub. J.J. Keliher, London)

Illustrations for Postcards:

- Coldstream Guards, Bank of England Picket (Published by Valentine & Sons Ltd)
- Regimental Pipe Band, The Black Watch (Published by Valentine & Sons Ltd)
- Royal Horse Guards, Changing of the Guard (Published by Valentine & Sons Ltd)
- The Life Guards, The Drummer and Band in State Dress (Published by Valentine & Sons Ltd)
