= Alison Bruce (physicist) =

British physicist

Alison Mary Bruce
- Education: University of Manchester
- Scientific career
- Fields: nuclear physics
- Workplaces: Niels Bohr Institute; University of Brighton
- Thesis: Studies of the Interacting Boson-Fermion Model in the W-Os-Pt nuclei (1985)

Alison Bruce is a British physicist who is a professor of nuclear physics at the University of Brighton. Her research considers the shape of atomic nuclei. She developed arrays of scintillation gamma-ray detectors for the determination of electromagnetic transition rates. She was awarded the 2024 Ernest Rutherford Medal and Prize from the Institute of Physics.

== Early life and education ==
Bruce completed her doctoral research at the University of Manchester. She studied W-Os-Pt nuclei and developed Interacting Boson-Fermion Models. She worked at the Niels Bohr Institute, where she used electric dipoles to understand the shapes of deformed nuclei. She used boson model symmetries to predict the spectra of odd-odd N=Z nuclei.

== Research and career ==
Bruce was made a professor at the University of Brighton in 2005. She was the first woman to hold such a position, and developed Brighton's programme on nuclear physics. She created experimental strategies to measure transition rates in rare-earth nuclei. Bruce develops scintillation gamma-ray detectors for measuring electromagnetic transition rates with high precision. These detectors can be assembled in arrays and engineered to have sub-nanosecond timing capabilities.

Bruce has led UK efforts in international programmes, including Riken's Radioactive Beam Factory, Germany's Facility for Antiproton and Ion Research and the Decay SPECtroscopy. At Riken she performed the first fast-time measurements of the most neutron-rich zirconium isotopes (^{104,106}Zr), and found that they had deformed quadrupole shapes.

Bruce was awarded the 2024 Ernest Rutherford Medal and Prize from the Institute of Physics.

== Selected publications ==
- T. Byrski; F. A. Beck; D. Curien; et al. (1 April 1990). "Observation of identical superdeformed bands in N=86 nuclei". Physical Review Letters. 64 (14): 1650–1653. Bibcode:1990PhRvL..64.1650B. doi:10.1103/physrevlett.64.1650. ISSN 0031-9007. PMID 10041452. Wikidata Q57814046.
- M.A. Riley; D.M. Cullen; A. Alderson; et al. (May 1990). "Multiple superdeformed bands in 194Hg and their dynamical moments of inertia". Nuclear Physics A. 512 (1): 178–188. doi:10.1016/0375-9474(90)90010-j. ISSN 1873-1554. Wikidata Q57814041.
- Bracco A; Jens-Jorgen Gaardhoje; Alison Bruce; et al. (1 May 1989). "Saturation of the width of the giant dipole resonance at high temperature". Physical Review Letters. 62 (18): 2080–2083. doi:10.1103/physrevlett.62.2080. ISSN 0031-9007. PMID 10039851. Wikidata Q74494576.
