= Janet Burroway =

American author

- Born: September 21, 1936 (age 90); Tucson, Arizona, U.S.
- Education: University of Arizona; Columbia University (BA); University of Cambridge (BA); Yale University (MFA)
- Occupation: Writer
- Spouse: Peter Ruppert
- Children: 3
- Writing career
- Genres: fiction poetry plays
- Notable works: Writing Fiction: A Guide to Narrative Craft; The Buzzards; Raw Silk
- Website: janetburroway.com

Janet Burroway (born September 21, 1936) is an American author. Burroway's published oeuvre includes eight novels, memoirs, short stories, poems, translations, plays, two children's books, and two how-to books about the craft of writing. Her novel The Buzzards was nominated for the 1970 Pulitzer Prize. Raw Silk is her most acclaimed novel thus far. While Burroway's literary fame is due to her novels, the book that has won her the widest readership is Writing Fiction: A Guide to Narrative Craft, first published in 1982. Now in its 10th edition, the book is used as a textbook in writing programs throughout the United States.

== Early life and education ==
Burroway was born in Tucson, Arizona. The second child and only daughter of tool and die worker Paul Burroway and his wife Alma (née Milner). Janet Burroway was educated in Phoenix. Burroway's intelligence and gift for words resulted in one of her elementary school teachers tutoring her in poetry after class. She was educated at the University of Arizona, Barnard College of Columbia University, Cambridge University, and the Yale School of Drama.

Her first scholarships were courtesy of local men's clubs, the Elks and the Knights of Pythias, and allowed her to attend the University of Arizona. After studying there for a year (1954–55), Burroway won the Mademoiselle Magazine College Board Contest and spent part of the summer of 1955 in New York City as the magazine's Guest Editor.

Burroway's first poem to be published in a national magazine was “The Rivals,” which appeared in Seventeen when Burroway herself was eighteen (June 1954). In 1955, her first play, Garden Party, was produced at Barnard College. Seventeen also published Burroway's first short story, “I Do Not Love You, Wesley,” in January 1957. In August of that same year, The Atlantic published Burroway's poem “Song.”

After receiving her M. A. from Cambridge, Burroway taught at the University of Sussex from 1965 to 1970.

== Personal life ==
Burroway married Belgian theatre director Walter Eysselinck and lived in Belgium for two years where she worked as a costume designer. The couple's oldest son, Timothy Alan Eysselinck, was born in Ghent in 1964 and committed suicide in Windhoek, April 21, 2004. After Eysselinck took a theatre job in Sussex, the family moved to England, where Burroway had their second child in 1966. She left Eysselinck in 1971.

She married William Dean Humphries, an artist, in 1978, but the marriage did not last. The two divorced in 1981.

In 1993, Burroway married her long-time partner, Utopian scholar Peter Ruppert. The two live in Chicago.

== Writing career ==
While in England, Burroway finished her first novel, Descend Again. Often overlooked by critics because it was not published in the United States, the book is structured around the myth of Plato's “Cave.” The novel was reissued in 2022 by the UK publisher Michael Walmer--followed in turn in 2024 by The Dancer from the Dance and in 2026 by Eyes. Walmer's intention is to re-publishng her whole oeuvre.In 1961, Burroway's first book of poetry, But to the Season, was published by Keele University Press. Burroway spent 1960–1961 in New Haven, Connecticut after receiving an RCA/NBC scholarship in playwriting from the Yale School of Drama.

Her fourth novel, The Buzzards, came out in 1969. It was nominated for the Pulitzer Prize. Critic Elisabeth Muhlenfeld said, “The Buzzards is a political novel of unusual artistry. Its controlling metaphor is adopted from the first chorus of the Oresteia . . . . [when] warrior-birds swoop upon a pregnant hare, tearing out the unborn brood.”

That same year the first of Burroway's two children's books, The Truck on the Track, came out in England. The American edition was published the following year by Bobbs-Merrill. The book enjoyed a long print run,

Her second children's book The Giant Jam Sandwich with illustrations by John Vernon Lord was first published in 1972 and had enduring popularity. In 2008, composer Philip Wharton set it to music for narrator and orchestra, and the piece had its debut performance with the Iowa City Symphony.

Burroway completed her fourth play, Hoddinott Veiling, in 1970; it was performed that year by ATV Network Television in London. Another play, The Fantasy Level, was first produced in 1961 at the Yale School of Drama, and again in 1968 by the Gardner Center for the Arts for the Brighton Festival in Sussex. The Beauty Operators was also produced by the Gardner Center for the Arts, then by the Armchair Theatre, Thames Television in London in 1970.

In 1971, her marriage had finally collapsed. She came back to America with her sons after landing a position at the University of Illinois. Depressed and distraught, Burroway contemplated suicide.

In 1972, Burroway accepted a position as Associate Professor of English Literature and Writing at Florida State University in Tallahassee. Except for brief stints at other institutions as a visiting professor, Burroway taught at Florida State University until her retirement in 2002.

Burroway received a National Endowment for the Arts Creative Writing Fellowship in 1976, which was followed by two resident fellowships at Yaddo (in Saratoga Springs, New York), one in 1985 and again in 1987.

Burroway's fifth novel, Raw Silk took seven years to research and write, but it was responsible for introducing her to a wide popular audience. The book was also important for her personally, since she had incorporated chunks of her own life into it, a practice she had tentatively begun in The Buzzards. Burroway wrote about eighty pages in a two-day period, then revised the material down to nine pages that “worked perfectly well as narrative. And it forced me to see that if I was avoiding my real concerns and trying to write Great Literature, I would likely not be able to write.” After that, Burroway looked over the books she had written and realized that the threads she consistently wove through her narrative and kept returning to—in particular, mentor relationships, the abandonment of children, race, and suicide—were in fact themes. “That's why I began Raw Silk with, ‘This morning I abandoned my only child.’”

Another book of poetry, Material Goods, was published in 1980 by the University Presses of Florida. In 1982, the first edition of Burroway’s “how-to” book, Writing Fiction: A Guide to Narrative Craft, was published. Burroway wrote two more novels, Opening Nights (Antheum, 1985), which draws on her background in theatre, and Cutting Stone, set, like her first novel, in a small Arizona town of another era. Cutting Stone became a Book-of-the-Month Club alternate selection, and in 1993-94 Burroway was awarded the Lila Wallace-Reader's Digest Fellowship. A collection of essays-as-memoir, Embalming Mom, came out in 2002. By 2004, Burroway was working on another novel, Paper, which dealt with the love affair between a white woman and a black mill worker.

In 2004, Burroway's eldest son committed suicide. For a while, his suicide was all she could write about. Writing about Tim helped her cope with her grief. Her memoir of him, Losing Tim, was published in 2014

Eventually, she returned to the subject matter of Paper. Re-conceived and re-christened Bridge of Sand, the novel explores what happens when a white woman falls in love with a black man in the contemporary American South.

Known for her complex female protagonists, Burroway is adept at assuming the speech and thought patterns of characters of another gender, race, or age. The authors she most admires (and continues to reread) are Jane Austen, George Eliot, Joseph Conrad, and Henry James.

Burroway's ninth novel Simone in Pieces (2025) tells the story of a refugee girl rescued during WWII. Because her memory is damaged and she must gradually reconstruct her self, her story comes from others that she meets, in a variety of British, American, and Hungarian voices, until she can take over in her own voice.

== Reception ==
Burroway's work has been greeted with approval, enthusiasm, and, on occasion, rave reviews. Critic Elisabeth Muhlenfeld has called her “a writer of wide range and many voices” who has “consciously avoided current trends.” Author Joan Fry referred to her as “a writer’s writer, a prodigiously talented all-American girl.” Critic Thomas Rankin observed that Burroway's fiction is known for “its stylistic excellence and tragicomic tone, portraying evil as the result of emotional blindness.” He also notes that Burroway “has been called a Renaissance woman for her achievements as a novelist, teacher, playwright, [poet], columnist, and critic,” but that her most important achievement “may be the encouragement and role modeling she provides for young women who aspire to write.”

== Awards and recognition ==
In 1995 she was awarded the highest accolade at The Florida State University, the Robert O. Lawton Distinguished Professorship.

www.janetburroway.comIn 2014, she was named as the recipient of the Florida Humanities Council's 2014 Lifetime Achievement Award for Writing.

== Publications ==
=== Books ===
- Descend Again, novel, Faber and Faber, London, 1960. OCLC 5194614; Michael Walmer Publisheer, Sandness, 2022
- But to the Season, poems, Keele University Press, 1961. OCLC 19251794
- The Dancer from the Dance, novel, Faber and Faber, 1965 OCLC 436695; Little, Brown and Co., Boston, 1967; Michael Walmer 2024
- Eyes, novel, Faber and Faber, 1966; Little, Brown, 1966. OCLC 1275802; Michael Walmer 2026
- "Poenulus, or The Little Carthaginian," adaptation from the Latin, in Five Roman Comedies, ed. Palmer Bovie, E. P. Dutton & Co., New York, 1970; reprinted in The Complete Roman Drama series, Johns Hopkins University Press, ed. David Slavitt and Palmer Bovie, 1995.
- The Buzzards, novel, Little, Brown, 1969 (nominated for the Pulitzer Prize, 1970); Faber and Faber, 1970. OCLC 28379
- The Truck on the Track, children's book, Jonathan Cape, London, 1970; Bobbs-Merrill, Indiana, 1971 OCLC 135976; Jr. Literary Guild Selection, 1971; Pan paperback edition, London, 1972; Televised by the BBC, London, 1975.
- The Giant Jam Sandwich, children's book, Jonathan Cape, London, 1972; Houghton Mifflin, Boston, 1973 OCLC 736837; German translation, Das Riesen-Marmeladenbrot, K. Thienmanns, Stuttgart, 1974; Pan paperback edition, 1975; National Scholastic Publications, "Lucky Club" choice; Televised by the BBC, London, 1977; Weekly Reader Children's Book Club, Fall 1978; Paperback edition Sandpiper, Boston, 1987; Read on Dutch and Belgian television in Dutch translation 1988; Paperback edition, Piccolo, London, 1988; Cassette edition, Houghton Mifflin, 1990; Houghton Mifflin Harcourt board book edition 2010; paperback edition Red Fox (Random House), New York 2011; included in A Classic Story for Every Day, London, Hutchinson-Random House, 2014.
- Raw Silk, novel, Little, Brown, 1977, ISBN 0316117676; Victor Gollancz, Ltd., London, July 1977; condensed in Redbook Magazine, Jan. 1976; condensed in Cosmopolitan (London), July 1977; serialized in Cleo (Australia), 1977–78; paperback edition, Pocket Books, New York, March 1979. Second paperback edition Bantam Books, N.Y., June 1986; e-book, Open Road Media, N.Y., March 2014.
- Material Goods, poems, University Presses of Florida, Sept. 1980. ISBN 0813006708
- Writing Fiction: A Guide to Narrative Craft; Little, Brown & Co, College Division, Boston, 1982; Second Edition Oct. 1986; first selection, Writer's Digest Book Club, Jan. 1987; Third edition, HarperCollins, New York, Sept. 1991; Fourth Edition, HarperCollins, 1995; Fifth Edition, Addison Wesley Longman, 1999, Seventh Edition, Longman, 2006; 8th Edition, Longman, 2011, ISBN 9780205750344; Ninth Edition, Pearson, 2014, ISBN 9780321923165; Tenth Edition, University of Chicago Press, 2019,
- Opening Nights, novel, Atheneum, New York, June 1985, and Gollancz, July 1985; Paperback Edition, Bantam Books, New York, June 1986; Book-of-the-Month-Club alternate selection from Jan. 1986.; Swedish translation, Plats pa Scen, Bonniers, Stockholm, 1987; Radio adaptation in production from Arts Repertory Theatre and the FSU School of Motion Picture, Television and Recording Arts, transmitted on WFSU summer 1996.
- Cutting Stone, novel; Houghton Mifflin, Boston, April 1992, and Victor Gollancz, London, July 1992; paperback edition Pinnacle Books (division of Zebra, Inc.) Oct. 1993; paperback edition, Indigo Books, Victor Gollancz June 1996.
- Embalming Mom, essays, Iowa City: University of Iowa Press, 2002; paperback edition, 2003.
- Imaginative Writing: the Elements of Craft, New York: Longman and Penguin Academics, 2002; second edition 2006; third edition, Pearson, 2011; fourth edition, Pearson, 2014.
- From Where You Dream: The Process of Writing Fiction, ed. (the lectures of Robert Olen Butler). Grove Press, New York, 2005. ISBN 0802117953
- Bridge of Sand, New York and Boston, Houghton Mifflin Harcourt, 2009; and Sydney, Australia, Murdoch Books 2009. ISBN 9780151015436
- Losing Tim: the Life and Death of an American Contractor in Iraq, A Memoir Think Piece Publishing, 2014. ISBN 0989235238
- Simone in Pieces, University of Wisconsin Press, 2025.

=== Poetry ===
- "The Rivals," Seventeen, June 1954.
- "Song," The Atlantic, August 1957.
- "Song" and "Owed to Dickens," New Poems by American Poets, ed. Rolfe Humphries, Ballantine, New York, 1957.
- "Introduction" and "Epithalamion," Granta (Cambridge, England), 29 November 1958.
- "Aubade," Granta, 24 January 1959.
- "Prolegomenon," Granta, 7 March 1959.
- "Footnote," Granta, 6 June 1959
- "Piecework," Delta, October 1959.
- "Benevolence," Granta, 7 November 1959.
- "Aubade" and "Epithalamion," Universities Poetry 2, Keele University Press, 1959.
- "D'Accord" and "The Scientist," Granta, 23 January 1960.
- "Solo," Granta, 14 May 1960.
- "James's Park," "D'Accord," and "The Scientist," Universities Poetry 3, Keele University Press, 1961.
- "The Scientist," New Poems 1961, A P.E.N. Anthology, ed. Plomer, Cork and Thwaite, Hutchinson, London, 1961; The Guinness Book of Poetry, Putnam, London, 1962; Sound and Sense: An Introduction to Poetry, Fourth Edition, ed. Laurence Perrine, Harcourt Brace Jovanovich, New York, 1973, and following editions; "set" for the 1994-95 American high school "Academic Decathelon."
- "A Few Particulars," Twenty-Seven Poems, ed. Woolf and Taylor, University of Sussex Press, Brighton, 1966.
- "Nuns at Birth," New Statesman (London), July 1970; Best Poems of 1970: Borestone Mountain Poetry Awards 1971; Articulations: Poetry about Illness and the Body, anthology, ed. Jon Mukland, U. Iowa Press, 1995.
- "Lievre aux Capres," Cafe at St. Marks, ed. Van K. Brock, Anhinga Press, Tallahassee, 1975.
- "Separation," New Statesman, 16 May 1975; MS. Magazine, November 1975.
- "Hole," Sun Dog, Florida State University, Spring 1979.
- "Lines to King's Cross Terminal," Critical Quarterly, Manchester, Spring 1980; Sarajevo: An Anthology for Bosnian Relief, Elgin Community College, fall 1993.
- "Material Goods" and "Appleyard Odyssey," Sun Dog, Spring 1980.
- "Mother Hood," Konglomerati, Spring 1983; North of Wakulla, an anthology, Anhinga Press, 1990.
- "Catcher," Florida Review (First prize winner, Florida Poetry Contest), Fall 1983.
- "Maternal Line," Red Bass, Nos. 8/9, Fall 1985.
- "This Is," Apalachee Quarterly, Fall 1985, and Yearbook of American Poetry, Monitor, Beverly Hills, 1987.
- "Florida Hard Freeze," Caprice, 1990.
- "This Hammock is for Peter," The Chattahoochee Review, fall, 1992.
- "Text/tile," memoir, produced as a text for dance, performed by the Dance Theatre, FSU, and published in Writing in Education, National Association of Writers in Education, Huddersfield, England, winter 1993.
- "Three Ideas" ("Democracy," "Shame," "Heaven"), Caprice, Nov. 1995, Wichita, Kansas.
- "Workout" ("Biceps," "Triceps," "Forceps"), Caprice, April 1996.
- “Four Deadly Sins,” Chelsea, 2001.
- “The Tim Poems: Roadkill, Scuppernong, Monologue, Airport, Plenty, Post,” Prairie Schooner, Fall 2006; "Monologue," The Power of the Feminine I, 2024.
- "Timeless," Prairie Schooner, 2023.
- "A Pantoum for Alex," Narrative Magazine," 2023, In the Tempered Dark," 2025.
- "Mother Hood," The Power of the Feminine I, 2024.
- "Terra Cotta," In the Tempered Dark, 2025.

=== Stories ===
- "I Do Not Love You, Wesley," Seventeen, January 1957.
- "A Letter to Remember not to Mail," Granta (Cambridge, England), 8 November 1958.
- "The Fantasy Level," Granta, 17 October 1959; The Yale Review, summer 1961.
- "The Rest of It, July," Granta, 30 April 1960.
- "Extra Days," Story Quarterly, winter 1976; reprinted in The Best of Story Quarterly, 1990.
- "Disaster," Apalachee Quarterly, Fall 1980.
- "Embalming Mom," Apalachee Quarterly, Spring 1985; reprinted in The Source of the Spring, Conari Press, Spring 1998.
- "Winn Dixie," New Letters on the Air, Winter 1985, and New Letters, Winter 1986; reprinted in New Visions, an anthology of Florida writers, Arbiter Press, 1989.
- "Uncle Ben's," novella, New Letters, March 1987.
- "Growth," New Virginia Quarterly, Winter 1990.
- "I'toi," Prairie Schooner, Spring 1991.
- "Pool," for the Florida Humanities Council project "Making Florida Home," 1993.
- "Dad Scattered," in anthology The Day My Father Died, Running Press, N.Y. 1994.
- "Tea Leaves," in Microfiction, anthology ed. Jerome Stern for W.W. Norton & Co., fall 1996.
- "Report on Professional Activities," Black Warrior Review, Fall 1997 (with interview by Joan Fry). Nominated for a Pushcart Prize.
- “Deconstruction,” Prairie Schooner, Winter 1999 (winner of the Lawrence Foundation Award).
- “Regular,” New Letters, spring 2001.
- “The Mandelbrot Set,” Five Points, Winter 2002; 2003 Pushcart Prize XXVII; Best of the Small Presses, ed. Bill Henderson.
- “Oracles,” Prairie Schooner, fall 2004, winner of the Prairie Schooner “Readers’ Choice” award.
- “Sublet,” Ninth Letter, Spring 2005.
- “Chronotope,” Prairie Schooner, Summer 2006, winner of PS “Readers Choice” Award.
- Excerpt from Devil’s Play, Iron Horse Review, Winter 2007.
- Excerpt from Indian Dancer, “Blackout,” (winner of third prize, Love Story Competition), Narrative Magazine, Spring 2008.
- Excerpts from Bridge of Sand, Prairie Schooner, Winter, 2008; and Narrative Magazine Autumn 2008.
- "White Space," (winner of first prize, Winter Contest), Narrative Magazine, Winter 2009.
- "Saving Bambi," Medium, 2016.
- "Home Help," (first prize, story contest) Narrative Magazine, 2017.
- "Lady Lazarus and "Transit, District of Columbia," New Letters Magazine, 2020.
- "Newcomer," Narrative Magazine, 2022.
- "Straight Home," (first prize, story contest, Narrative Magazine, 2022.
- "Basic Training," Tusculum Review, 2025.

=== Plays and performance texts ===
- Garden Party, Barnard College, 1955.
- The Fantasy Level, Yale School of Drama, 1961; Roberson Memorial Center, Binghamton, N.Y., 1963; Belgian National Television (in Dutch translation), 1965; Gardner Center for the Arts, for the Brighton Festival, Sussex, 1968. Playwrights' Theatre, Tallahassee, 1979.
- The Beauty Operators, Gardner Center for the Arts, 1968; Armchair Theatre, Thames Television, London, 1970; Belgian National Television (in Dutch translation), 1971.
- Hoddinott Veiling, ATV Network Television, London, 1970; British Independent Television's entry in the 1970 Monte Carlo Festival "Best Television Drama" category.
- Due Care and Attention, ATV Network Television, London, 1973.
- Dadadata: Homage to John Cage, text for dance, FSU Dance Dept., Oct. 1990.
- Text/Tile, text for dance, FSU Dance Department for "Twelve Days of Dance", Nov. 1991. Reprise, Florida Museum of History, R.A. Gary Building, Oct. 5, 1997.
- Medea with Child, staged reading, Playwright's Theatre, London, June 1994; and International Women's Day, Tallahassee, 1995; Winner of the Reva Shiner Award, Bloomington Playwrights' Project; production October 1997.
- The Empty Dress, text for dance, "Gendered Space," Florida Women's Studies Conference, FSU Oct. 1994, and "Twelve Days of Dance," FSU Dance Department, Nov. 1994, Center for Professional Development and Public Service, Jan. 1995.
- Opening Nights, radio adaptation (with Charles Olsen), production by the Actors’ Repertory Theatre; sponsored by WFSU-TV and the FSU School for the Production of Film, Television and the Recording Arts; Tallahassee transmission summer 1997.
- Yazoo City Station, text for dance, FSU Dance Repertory Theatre, collaboration with Lynda Davis, March 1998.
- Sweepstakes, a play, Reading at the Playwrights’ Center of San Francisco, Oct. 1998 (finalist in the annual Dramarama competition); production by the Actors’ Repertory Theatre at Tallahassee Little Theatre, Feb. 11–21, 1999; reading, the Royal National Theatre Studio, London, Nov. 1999; and at Women's Playwright's Initiative, Orlando, Feb, 2006.
- Quiltings: Text/tile Opus Three, text for dance, Birdsong Nature Reserve, Oct. 1999; reprise for Dance Repertory Theatre in Concert, Feb. 25–26, 2000.
- Division of Property, winner of the 2002 Arts & Letters Prize (chosen by Lanford Wilson), produced at Milledgeville, GA, April 2002, published in the Spring 2002 issue of Arts & Letters. Produced for the Imago One-Act Festival at the Stella Adler Academy and Theatre, Los Angeles, summer 2002.
- Parts of Speech, readings with Jane Alexander in a staging by Edwin Sherin, FSU Conradi Theatre, March 2004; Women's Playwright's Initiative, directed by Ellen Jones, Orlando, January, 2007; and Chicago Dramatists, Dec. 2008; winner of the Br!nk playwriting competition, Renaissance Theatreworks, Milwaukee, WI, 2014.
- Long Time No See, produced at Bloomington Playwrights’ Theatre, Bloomington, Indiana, July 31 – Aug.2, 2008.
- Winn Dixie, film adaptation by Ana Silverlinck, USC Film School, 2008.
- Morality Play, musical, adapted from the novel by Barry Unsworth, with composer Matthew M. Kiedrowski, concert reading (Midwest New Musicals, Light Opera Works and NEA), Athenaeum Theatre, Chicago, Feb. 2012; third prize winner, New Musicals Incorporated (Los Angeles, CA) international new musicals search, 2015.
- Boomerang, commissioned by the Sideshow Theatre Company as part of their Freshness Initiative, Chicago, 2015.
- The Perfect Pig, score by Philip Wharton, On Site Opera, Little Island, Hudson River Park, 2025.
- "Seven Songs for a Dead Son," music by Philip Wharton, performed by Carla Thelen Hanson, Knoxville,, TN, 2025.
