= University of Brighton School of Art =

Art school at the University of Brighton

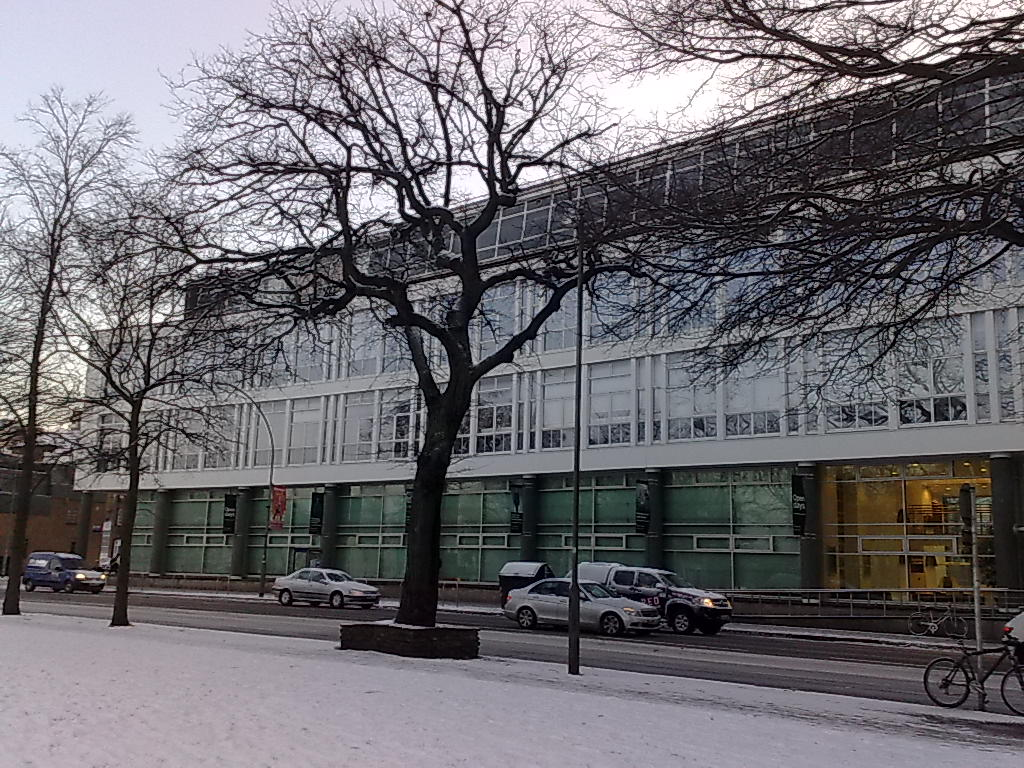
Grand Parade in Snow 2010 University of Brighton Faculty of Arts

Founded as the Brighton School of Art in 1859, the University of Brighton School of Art and Media is an organisational part of the University of Brighton, with courses in the creative arts, visual communication, media, craft and fashion and textile design.

The oldest part of the university, it has operated with a changing portfolio of disciplines throughout its history. Further to its current provision, those subjects that have been primary in its make-up and ethos include: art education, design, art and design history, photography and performance arts.

As the school became the core of more extensive faculty or college structures, these disciplines, along with other arts and humanities at the university, were organised under names that reflected new provision and changing policy: Faculty of Art and Design (1992–1999), the Faculty of Art and Architecture (1999–2009), the Faculty of Arts (2009–2014), the College of Arts and Humanities (2014–2017), the School of Art (2017-2020), and the School of Art and Media (2021-).

The University of Brighton has supported the arts in its widest sense for many decades. In 2009, its 150th anniversary celebrated the work of numerous artists, designers, historians, photographers and architects who had studied and taught at the institution.

== Alumni, staff and associates ==
The university has educated many key figures in the arts. In 2009 an Exhibition, From Art School to University: Art and Design at Brighton 1859–2009, paid tribute to many of them and included Turner Prize winners, design work, dance for camera and rock and pop imagery.

Turner Prize winners Keith Tyson and Rachel Whiteread studied there, as did artists Alison Lapper, Keith Coventry, Sylvia Sleigh, designer Julien Macdonald and writer-illustrator Emily Gravett.

Students, lecturers and researchers once at Brighton include sculptor Anthony Gormley, Alexandra Gage, Viscountess Gage, Clive Gardiner, Kate Greenaway Medal winners Emily Gravett, Raymond Briggs and Quentin Blake; artist Mike Chaplin; children's writer-illustrator Lucy Cousins; Magnum photographer Mark Power; fashion designers Barbara Hulanicki and Julien Macdonald.

Contributions made to modern visual culture by university members in the arts include Royal Designer for Industry George Hardie's cover designs for Pink Floyd's The Dark Side of the Moon, and several series of Royal Mail stamps, and John Vernon Lord's sleeve for Deep Purple's Book of Taliesyn.

The longer history of the school of art in Brighton includes artists Conrad Heighton Leigh and Helen Chadwick, and poster designer John Bellany.

See Categories:Alumni of the University of Brighton

== History ==
=== 19th century, Brighton School of Art ===
Ideas for the establishment of a School of Art in Brighton resulted from a public meeting in 1858 which led to the formation of a Committee to raise subscriptions and donations. The Committee sought to “instruct working people to do their work better by turning it out of hand neatly and handsomely as well as usefully, and thus enable them to command the best price for their labour, and to compete more successfully with the foreign workman”. Most of the art schools that had been established in Britain by the 1840s and 1850s were linked to local and regional industries. Brighton was not an industrial centre in the most obvious sense but, according to Henry Cole her "industries" were "health, recreation, education and pleasure".

On Monday 17 January 1859 Brighton School of Art opened its doors to more than fifty pupils and was situated in a room off the Royal Pavilion Kitchen provided by the Town Council. The first Art Master was John White, who brought with him experience of a similar post at Leeds School of Practical Art and ran classes for several different constituencies: those of independent means who attended the Day Classes and were segregated by gender; artisans who were provided with evening classes at a low fee rate; and teachers, for whom fees were lower still.

New premises for Brighton School of Science and Art were purpose-built in Grand Parade, Brighton, in 1877, in a Romanesque Revival style, with the façade in brick with Bath stone coping and cornices. The columns flanking the main entrance were in polished red granite, and the façade enriched by a series of terracotta panels and lunettes that had been designed by the Art Master Alexander Fisher, and executed by Messrs Johnson at the nearby Ditchling Pottery Workshop. Princess Louise, Duchess of Argyll, the most artistic of Queen Victoria’s children, and an accomplished sculptor in her own right, was present, as was Victorian art educational tsar, Sir Henry Cole.

=== 20th century ===
As a result of new openings for local authorities, a new Municipal School of Science and Technology, designed by F. C. May, the Borough Surveyor and Engineer, was opened on 20 September 1897. This allowed for an expansion of activities in the School in Grand Parade. At Brighton before World War I, the portfolio of courses at the School of Art included typography, silversmithing, jewellery, leatherwork, woodcarving, embroidery and lace making.

In 1915, the Design and Industries Association (DIA) was established, a national non government-funded organisation that set out to establish stronger relationships between British designers and manufacturers. The Head Master at Brighton, William H. Bond, played an important role in promoting the aims of the DIA in the town, explaining how Britain lagged behind her competitors such as Germany and America, claiming that the typographer "Edward Johnston was far better known in Germany than he was in England five years ago". During the First World War, the School of Art provided opportunities for a number of disabled soldiers at the Brighton Pavilion Hospital, offering training for such occupations as letter cutting in wood and stone, mechanical draughtsmanship, die-cutting and other related subjects that required instruction in industrial arts. Bond was also concerned with the appearance of Brighton, reacting negatively to many aspects of the urban environment, a theme that a number of his British arts and crafts antecedents such as John Ruskin and William Morris had pursued with zeal. Bond complained about the "gruesome horror" of the New England Road railway arch and commented on plans to render it an ‘attractive entrance to the town’. He also argued for the preservation of the ‘distinctive soul’ of Georgian Brighton (cf Georgian Architecture)and that the Town Council should desist from painting the Royal Pavilion "workhouse yellow" as it represented the "last despairing cry of colour on its deathbed, and in its raucous tones some devilish influences might be traced". The School of Art was well regarded in the international arena. The Daily Telegraph reported that at the 1925 Paris Exposition Internationale des Arts Décoratifs et Industriels Modernes, it received a Diploma of Honour for technical instruction, a Gold Medal for technical instruction in ceramics, and Silver Medals for technical instruction in textiles and metal.

Mural art was a field in which Brighton staff were widely recognised, bringing together the fine arts and interior design. A notable example was the interior of the Regent Cinema, Brighton, which included murals by Lawrence Preston of Brighton School of Art and Walter Bayes, Head of the Westminster School of Art. Lawrence Preston's other mural schemes included his First World War mural at St Luke's School, Brighton, restored in 2007 after a £30,000 fund-raising campaign. Dorothy Sawyers, another member of staff at the School was also widely known as a muralist who worked on cinema schemes.

Following the appointment in 1934 of E. A. Sallis Benney as its Principal, Brighton School of Art became involved with presenting its own fresh, modern and international profile. During World War II, the School of Art was able to demonstrate its usefulness to the wider community through involvement with the propaganda campaigns, in which the Women's Crafts Department provided a particular focus, especially in the "Make Do and Mend" ethos following the introduction of clothes rationing in the United Kingdom in 1941.

Brighton College of Art did not have specific industrial links in the way that similar educational institutions in Manchester and Birmingham did. Nonetheless, in the 1950s it was well placed to provide expertise in commercial and industrial design and worked with industry through a number of Advisory Committees alongside local, regional and national arts associations. Such activities found their applications in the development of the curriculum. In 1951, for example, the first cohort of students completed the National Retail Association of Furniture Retailers Diploma, launched at the College in 1949 as the first such course outside London.

=== Polytechnic ===
Following the 1963 Robbins Report on Higher Education and the White Paper, "A Plan for Polytechnics", there emerged proposals for Brighton Polytechnic, along with Brighton College of Technology. Brighton's Education Committee took the view that the Brighton College of Art should be preserved as a specialist institution of art and design. However, despite the uneasy accommodation of different standpoints at Brighton, the wider national campaigns against the absorption of art colleges into polytechnics continued into the 1970s, an outlook typified by painter Patrick Heron's article in The Guardian in October 1971, entitled "Murder in the Art Schools".

The Town Council decided to employ the municipal architect, Percy Billington, for the new building, rejecting the Education Committee's earlier enquiries into the possibility of bringing in outside architects sympathetic to the Regency style. Considerable local anger had been expressed about the possibility of demolishing a Grade II-listed terrace of Regency houses, against the advice of the Royal Fine Art Commission. Michael Viney, however, was more positive: "Decisively modern and pseudo anything, the building nonetheless makes gradual easy transition from the Regency bow-fronts adjacent in Grand Parade to the sharper, cleaner, more functional lines of 1958."

From its earliest days the School of Art (and its successors) sought involvement with the town and regional community, in areas such as the annual displays of student work and in a close relationship with many of the trades in the town. On a wider cultural front staff and students' participation in public performances began in the 1860s and constantly punctuated its history, whether the Carnivals and "Vision of Empire" for Empire Week in the 1920s, innovative performance and "live art" at The Zap club in the 1980s, or a variety of more recent manifestations such as "Dance for Camera" and "Smudged" at Tate Modern led by Alice Fox.

The Art College Basement Club was an important catalyst in the development of live and performing arts at Brighton. It hosted a wide range of performances, such as those associated with the innovative Brighton Contemporary Festival Arts (1977–79) organised by Roger Ely and Neil Butler. Dave Reeves, with Butler, was one of the founding directors of The Zap club.

A fresh diet of courses and innovations were rolled out during Robin Plummer's headship. During this period the range of courses included Fashion & Textiles with Administration, Graphic Design & Illustration, Expressive Arts (including music, dance, performance, theatre and visual studies) and History of Design, with the development of a number of postgraduate courses including Printmaking and Narrative and Sequential Illustration. A new Department of Art History was formed and headed by Robert Haynes in 1977. David Vaughan was appointed as course leader for the BA (Hons) Wood, Metal, Ceramics and Plastics degree in 1979, later becoming head of the department of Three Dimensional Design. Another key appointment made in these years was that of Bill Beech who was appointed as the head of the department of Fine Art following the retirement of Gwyther Irwin in 1984. In September 1986 the Department of Humanities joined the Faculty thereby setting in place the opportunity to develop fresh curricular initiatives.

=== Research Development ===
Robin Plummer was quick to see the importance of research for art and design, arguing for it nationally and implementing it locally, notably in the Brighton Design History: Fad or Function? Conference in 1977. Evelyn Goldsmith's PhD, completed in 1978, led to her book entitled Research into illustration: an approach and a review, published by Cambridge University Press in 1984. The merging of the Polytechnic with the Brighton College of Education in 1976 resulted in the transfer of the Department of Art Education to the Polytechnic's newly created Faculty of Education, long a distinctive aspect of the School of Art in its rite of passage from School of Art to Faculty of Art & Design. However, a number of academics specialising in the visual and performing arts joined the Faculty of Art and Design. This in turn led to the formation of a new Department of Combined Arts under the leadership of Peter Rose. Despite some misgivings on the part of a number of practitioners in the more established disciplinary fields in the Faculty, this proved to be a dynamic, challenging and highly productive initiative, with Liz Aggiss and Billy Cowie playing key roles in the areas of performance.

=== New University ===
A number of highly significant steps have been taken at Brighton since the 1960s, sustained by enhanced and developing intellectual and material resources. These include the establishment of Screen Archive South East, the Design Archives and the establishment of the Centre for Research & Development; the hosting of the CTI (Computers in Teaching Initiative) Centre for Art and Design, the Brighton Photo Biennial, Cinecity and the National Subject Centre for Learning & Teaching in Art, Design & Communications and its successor, the Higher Education Academy: Art, Design Media Subject Centre, and the establishment of the Centre for Excellence in Teaching and Learning through Design (CETLD). Many other networks, national and international, formal and informal have also been set in place

The institution's re-designation as the University of Brighton in 1992, with Professor David Watson as Vice-Chancellor, resulted in a number of fresh opportunities. Since 1992 there has been a discernible change in the ways in which the school/Faculty views itself and how the rest of the university, in turn, sees it. Success in art and design in the first round of the RAE which the University was able to enter confirmed two lingering prejudices: from the art and design perspective, there was still an aura of the notion of excellence as something that had been known since pre-polytechnic, independent art college days; from the standpoint of some other parts of the university there was still a lingering view that it was somehow easier for art and design to achieve academic and research success.
