= Aubrey Hammond =

English theater practitioner (1893–1940)

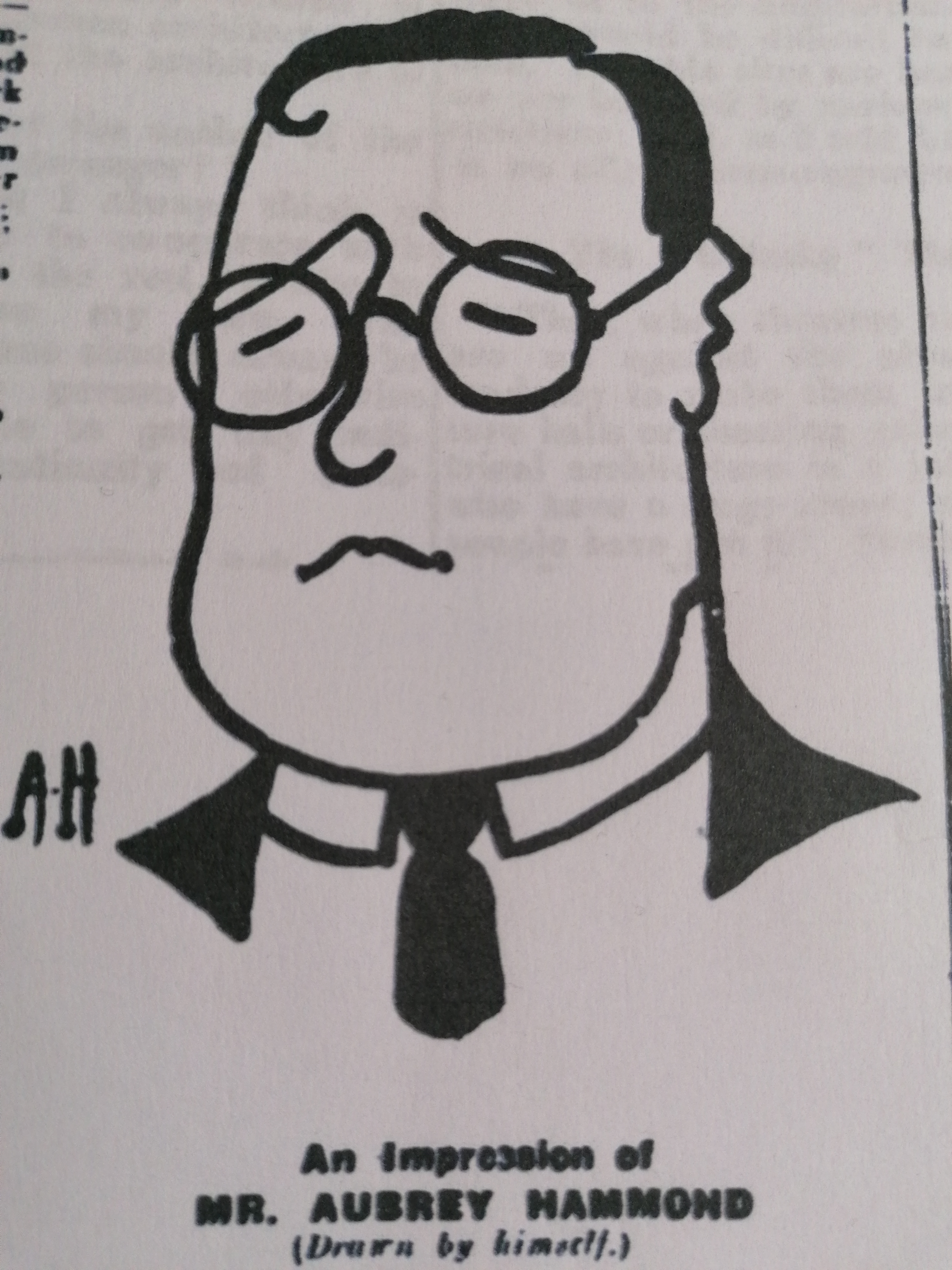

Aubrey Hammond (September 18, 1893 – March 19, 1940), was an English theatre practitioner. He worked as a set and costume designer in theatre and film and was a humourist, a book illustrator and commercial poster and advertising designer.

== Early life ==
Hammond was born in Folkestone, Kent, England on September 18, 1893. His father was Lindsay Hammond, son of a corn merchant, and his mother was Edith Elmore, an artist.

He boarded as a student in Westbourne House in Folkestone in 1911. Hammond later studied at the Byam Shaw School of Art and the Académie Julian, Paris. He taught commercial and theatrical art at the Westminster School of Art.

Hammond was involved in World War I from 1914 until his demobilisation in 1919. He served as a probationary Second Lieutenant in the 5th Battalion of the Dublin Fusiliers in 1915 but achieved the rank of Brigade Major by the end of the war. He was in Dublin with the 5th Royal Dublin Fusiliers during the 1916 Easter Rising. During the war, Hammond invented a form of camouflage and illustrated military magazines. A number of his obituaries referred to him as ‘a pioneer of camouflage.’ He was attached to the camouflage section of the army shortly after the outbreak of World War II.

Hammond was noted in London social circles for his height of over 6 ft 5in and his breadth. The Western Gazette described Hammond as an artist whose appearance belied his profession, “You will often see him, broad of shoulder and brawny of arm, strolling along Fleet Street, with his ‘sailor’s gait’ looking for all the world like a prize fighter – a naval welterweight.” His membership of The Savage Club led to his being often mentioned in press social columns. When Hammond holidayed on the island of Brioni in the Adriatic with boxer, Gene Tunney; the press noted that the weight of Tunney and Hammond represented a “considerable displacement” for the ship they would be travelling on to deal with.

The Commercial Art Magazine published a feature article reviewing Hammond’s advertising work in 1927. The author of the feature, R.P. Gossop, asserted that Hammond’s posters ‘have those qualities of design that are bringing this country back to the position that it held in the early days of poster.’

== Career ==
=== Theatrical costume and scenery design ===
After the war, he began work in Covent Garden as a paint room assistant. Hammond’s designs were always well received by the press, often overshadowing or even rescuing the drama from negative reviews. Topaze, written was by Marcel Pagnol and adapted by Benn Levy for the New Theatre, London, and it was reported that “the scenery was perhaps the most effective part of the production.” Mr. Pickwick, based on The Pickwick Papers, which the critic Harris Dean deemed a failure as a play also noted that it was only worth going to see because of Hammond’s “gorgeous” scenery. Another review stated that Hammond’s scenery designs ‘were worthy of a modern Hogarth.’ In a review of Now and Then the critic Ashley Dukes stated that the actors ‘were not good enough for the graceful costumes’ designed by Hammond.

Hammond's theatre designs were compared with and could even surpass work by Edward Gordon Craig and Claud Lovat Fraser. In the earlier half of his post-war career, Hammond worked on many productions with the playwright Ashley Dukes and the theatre impresarios Jose Levy and C.B. Cochran. Hammond was listed in The Oxford Companion to the Theatre where he was described as ‘among the most successful scenic designers of the nineteen-twenties.’ In 1932, Hammond designed the costumes and stage setting for the Irish Hospitals' Sweepstake.

From the early 1930s Hammond was a regular scenery designer for productions at the Stratford-upon-Avon Festival. In the 1934 season he designed for four of the opening eight plays performed in the first eleven weeks of the Festival. By 1935 Hammond had become the’ general scenic supervisor’ for the Shakespeare Memorial Theatre.

=== Film and television scenic design ===
During the mid-1930s Hammond designed sets for numerous film including what was called ‘a remarkable feat of scenic construction’ at Ealing Studios for the production of Take a Chance. The ‘feat’ involved the overnight re-construction of parts of Goodwood Racecourse in the studios based on designs by Hammond. . His designs for The Cardinal were described as those of ‘a genius.’ The live television broadcast of the opera based on Mr. Pickwick from Alexandra Palace studios on November 13, 1936 just eleven days after the BBC made its first broadcast were the first ever opera scenes to appear live on television. Hammond was very much involved in the production, not alone did he design the sets for the theatre production but he also devised the revolving stage for the television broadcast allowing the scenes to be presented with continuity.

=== Book illustrations ===
Hammond illustrated books and designed book covers during his career. Many were for British authors such as Lewis Melville but perhaps his most noted book cover design was for the 1927 English translation of Thea Gabriele von Harbou's Metropolis. According to The Illustrated Dust Jacket ‘Hammond’s design [for Metropolis] juxtaposes delicate colour harmony with nightmarish vision’. A number of his book illustrations were of a commercial nature such as the Brighton Official Handbook and Sands Across the Sea. Hammond was a frequent contributor to The Graphic where he illustrated D.B. Wyndham Lewis’ columns along with once off caricatures dealing with events of the day.

=== Poster designs ===
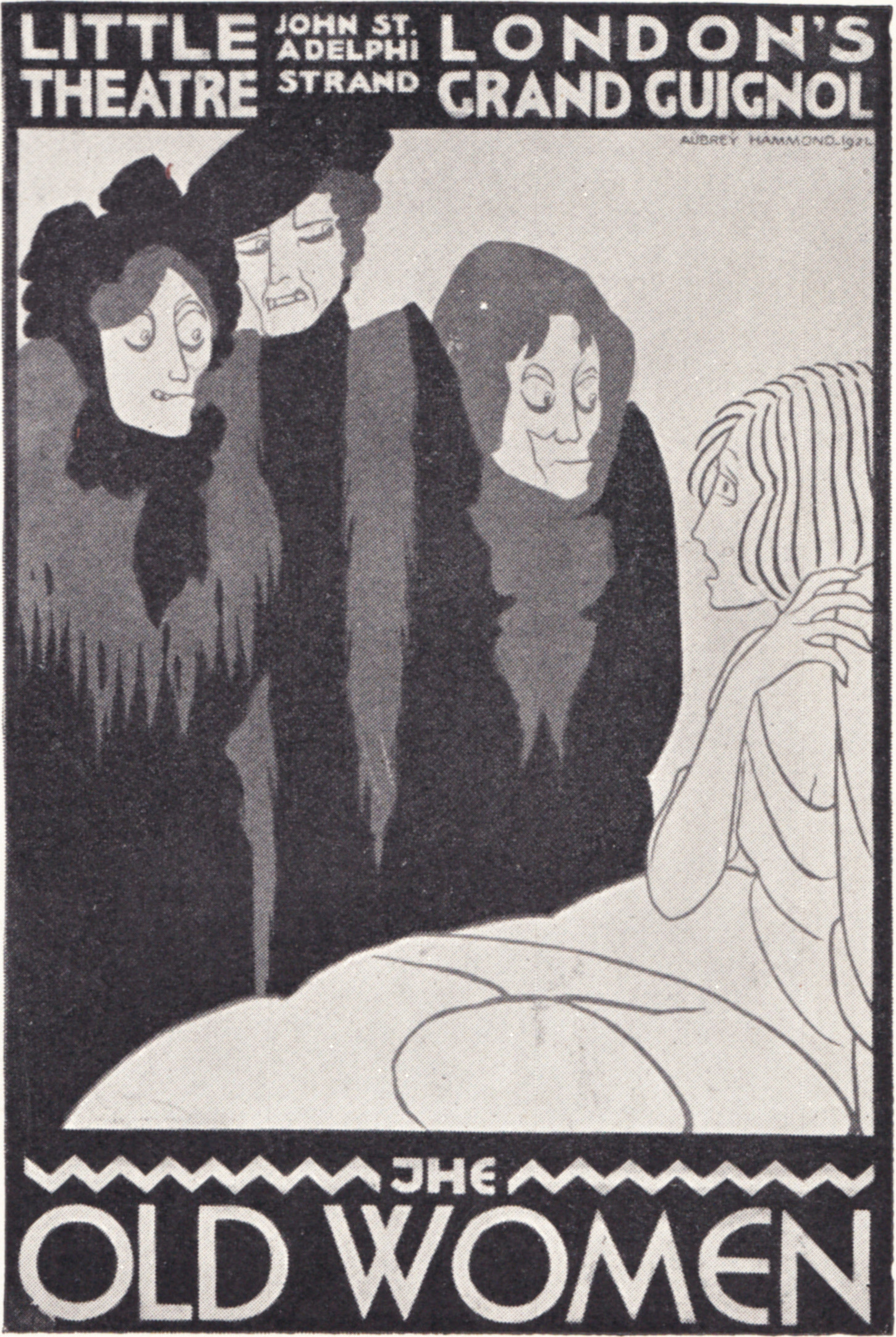
Cinema poster for The Old Women at The Little Theatre, London, 1922.

Many of Hammond’s poster designs were related to the theatre. Hammond featured in exhibitions of advertising posters at the V&A in 1931 and 1935 and his posters for The Little Theatre were still being discussed for their impact on the viewer. Earlier, in 1927, an exhibition dedicated solely to advertising posters also featured Hammond and commentators remarked on how the “atrocities which used to adorn our hoardings are now giving place to works of art.” When the state of British posters were compared negatively to American productions by the advertising consultant Sir Charles Higham, Hammond defended the British designers saying that “France is the only country turning out better posters than Great Britain and she is not far ahead and we will soon catch up with her.” Many of Hammond’s posters were used on the London Underground and by the London Underground Company; advertisements for resorts, holidays, cruises, theatre productions and consumable commodities by the artist were abundant throughout the transport system. In 1936 one writer remarked that who could forget “An Aubrey Hammond strip on a bus or in an underground train.” Hammond’s poster for The Old Women at The Little Theatre was rejected by London Underground Company as unsuitable for display.

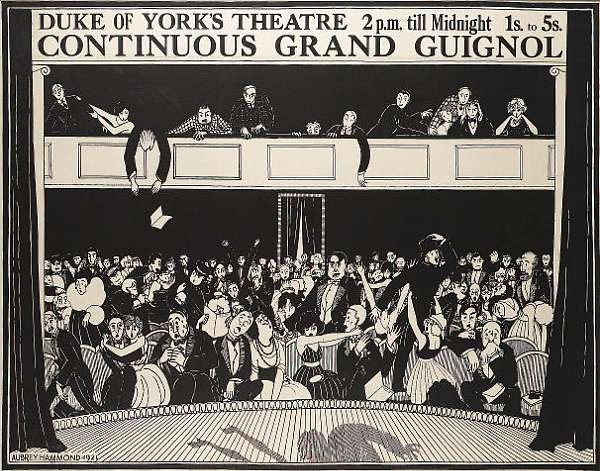
Continuous Grand Guignol

The posters designed by Hammond for The Little Theatre Grand Guignol focused on both audience and stage to reflect the violence and the macabre in the productions. Hammond’s design for the Unionist (Conservative) Party’s campaign poster for the 1924 U.K. general election was most unusual for the period and was hailed as ‘novel, arresting and fresh’ and ‘unlike any ever used before in all history of election “literature”.’ The English Journal reported that it was ‘the most popular of the many that were used during the campaign.’ and that ‘no explanation was necessary for this picture to give up its message at once.’

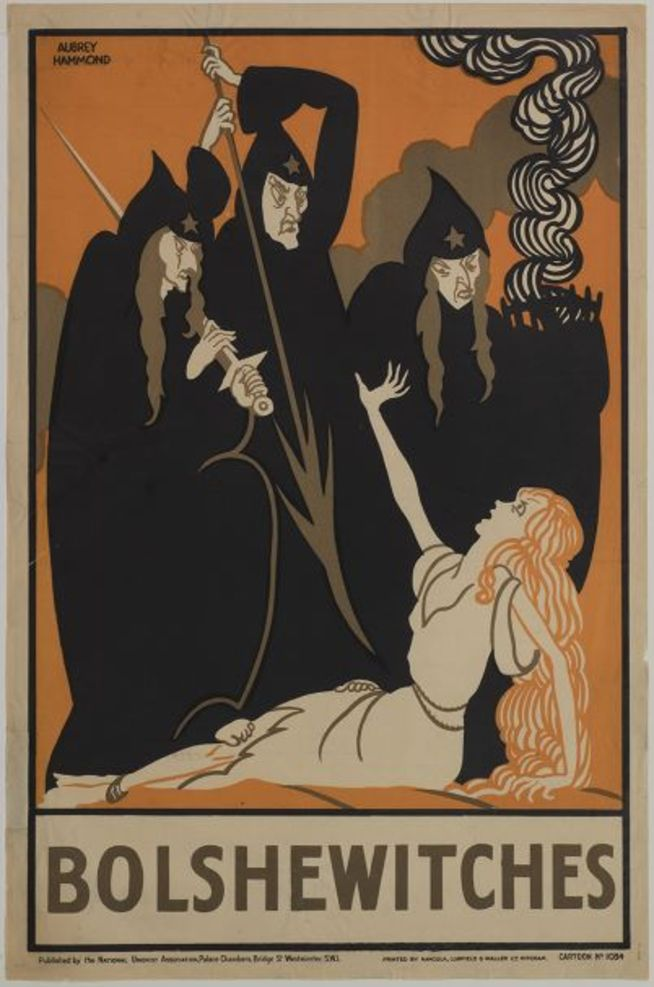
Bolshewitches. Conservative Party's Campaign Poster for the 1924 U.K. General ElectionDesigned by Aubrey Hammond

Hammond himself was critical of the style of cinema posters being used in the 1920s. He characterised them as being crude and sensationalist. However In a letter to the press he was particularly scathing of imported American Film posters and deemed British film companies to offer a less banal and trivial approach to film advertising posters.

=== Hiram Walker – Canadian Club whisky sample rooms ===
Hiram Walker commissioned Hammond to decorate rooms in their London office at Cockspur Street as a sampling and tasting rooms for their Canadian Club whisky. The murals that covered all four walls of the sample rooms were daring and eccentric in both appearance and colour for the time and place where they were to function. The décor combined art with function as the depictions of streetlamps, moons and suns operated electrically to cast their light upon the clientele of the bar. Each wall featured a different scene and location adding to the global essence of the brand - a Parisian street, complete with chat noir and cloaked flaneur, a terrace overlooking the deep azure of the Mediterranean Sea on the French Riviera, New York harbour and a winter mountain scene in Canada.

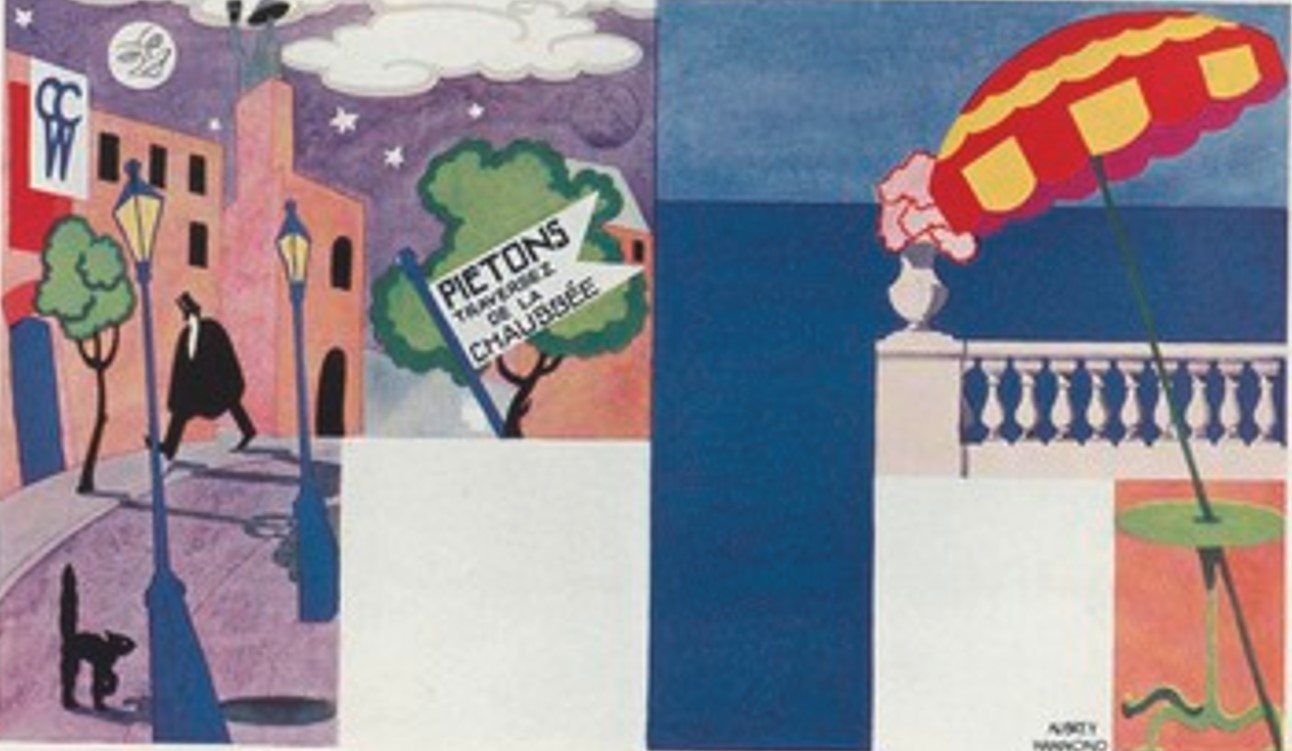
Mural for Interior of Canadian Club Rooms.

The ceiling was a display of sunshine and storm; the sun illuminated the whisky drinkers below. The Commercial Art magazine carried a four page article on the murals in 1927 where illustrations of some of the paintings are preserved.

=== Exhibitions ===
Hammond’s work was shown at a number of exhibitions including a 1924 solo show early in his career in Piccadilly, where his work was well received. The Aberdeen Press and Journal review of the exhibition stated that it was ‘One of the most interesting shows…the bold way in which he handles and harmonises deep lustrous blues, staring yellows and glaring reds is startling yet very pleasing.’ The Stage described Hammond as ‘the master of this quaint style of décor’[in theatre scenery]. While drama critic J.T. Grein said it was ‘a vivid demonstration of how rich is the fantasy and enterprise of young artists’

== See also ==
- List of works by Aubrey Hammond
