= List of works by Aubrey Hammond =

This is a list of works by the illustrator and theatrical designer Aubrey Hammond.

== List of plays featuring scenery and/or costumes designed by Hammond ==
- Oh!Hell!!, Reginald Arkell, Russell Thorndike, Jose Levy, Little Theatre (Grand Guignol), London, 1920.
- Just Fancy-A Revue, C.B. Cochran, London, 1921.
- In the Street, The Kingsway Theatre, London, 1921.
- Now and Then, The Vaudeville, London, 1921.
- The Man with a Load of Mischief, Ashley Dukes, The Haymarket, London, 1921. Also New York, 1925.
- The Rose and The Ring, The Playhouse, Liverpool, 1923.
- The Magic Sword, The Playhouse, Liverpool, 1923.
- Man and the Masses, The New Theatre, London, 1924.
- Puppets, André Charlot, The Vaudeville, London, 1924.
- Husband Love, Folkestone, 1924.
- Tess of the D’Urbervilles, Barnes Theatre, 1925
- The London Review, Norman Lee, Lyceum Theatre, 1925.
- The Forcing House, The Little Theatre, London, 1926.
- The Yellow Mask, Theatre Royal, Birmingham, 1927.
- Sylvia, The Vaudeville, London, 1927.
- The White Chateau, Everyman Theatre, Hampstead, London, 1927.
- One More River, New Theatre, London, 1927.
- One Dam Thing After Another, London Pavilion, London, 1927.
- Such Men Are Dangerous, Ashley Dukes, The Duke of York's Theatre, London, 1928.
- No Other Tiger, A.E.W. Mason, Prince of Wales Theatre, Birmingham, 1928.
- The Fountain Head, Ashley Dukes, The Arts Theatre, London, 1928.
- Song of the Sea, Arthur Wimperis & Lauri Wylie, His Majesty's Theatre, London, 1928.
- A Man with Red Hair, Benn W. Levy, Little Theatre, London, 1928.
- Mr. Pickwick, Cosmo Hamilton & Frank C. Reilly, The Haymarket, London, 1928.
- Her Past, Frederick Jackson, Lewisham Hippodrome, London, 1928.
- The Devil's Host, Carl Glick/Archibald Nettlefold, The Comedy Theatre, London, 1928.
- Red Rust, Frank Vernon, Little Theatre, London, 1929.
- The Roof, John Galsworthy, Basil Dean, The Vaudeville, London, 1929.
- Coo-Ee, Laurie Wylie/Melvin Gideon, Kingston Theatre, Kinston-Upon-Thames, London, 1929.
- Measure for Measure, Haymarket, London, 1929.
- Quality Street, J. M. Barrie, Haymarket, London, 1929.
- The Ivory Door, A.A. Milne, Haymarket, London, 1929.
- Jew Suss, Ashley Dukes/Lion Feuchtwanger, Her Majesty's Opera House, Blackpool, 1929.
- Bees and Honey, H. F. Maltby, New Theatre, London, 1929.
- Yesterday's Harvest, Margaret Pedlar(?)/Gladys St. John-Loe(?), The Apollo, London, 1929,
- The Circle of Chalk, James Laver/Basil Dean, New Theatre, London, 1929.
- French Leave, Archie de Bear/Reginald Berkeley, The Vaudeville, London, 1929.
- The House that Jack Built, Jack Hulbert, Adelphi Theatre, London, 1929.
- Charivaria, Melville Gideon, Prince of Wales Theatre, Birmingham, 1929.
- The Stag, Beverley Nichols, The Globe, London, 1929.
- The First Mrs. Fraser, St. John Ervine, The Haymarket, London, 1929.
- The Co-Optimists of 1930, Greatrex Newman, The Hippodrome, London, 1930.
- Down Our Street/Belle, Ernest George, The Vaudeville, London, 1930.
- Topaze, Marcel Pagnol/Benn Levy, King's Theatre, Glasgow, 1930.
- Hamlet, Horace Watson/Shakespeare, The Haymarket, London, 1930.
- Machines, Reginald Berkeley, The Arts Theatre Club, London, 1930.
- Little Catherine, Alfred Savior/Virginia & Frank Law, The Phoenix Theatre, London, 1931.
- Colonel Satan, Booth Tarkington, The Haymarket, London, 1931.
- Off the Map, Herbert Jones/Jose Levy, The Little Theatre, London, 1931.
- Frailties, Dion Titheradge, The Phoenix, London, 1931.
- Shanghai Nights, B.A. Mayer, The Empire Theatre, London, 1931.
- Vile Bodies, Evelyn Waugh/Nigel Playfair, The Arts Club, London, 1931.
- Kong, Harold Kingsley/Oscar Ashe, Cambridge Theatre, Cambridge, 1931.
- O.H.M.S., Reginald Berkeley, The New Theatre, London, 1931.
- Max and Mr. Max, Cecil Madden/Jose Lopez Rubio, The Vaudeville, London, 1931.
- Take Two from One, Harley Granville-Barker, The Haymarket, London, 1931.
- Wild Violets, Bruno Hardt-Warden, Drury Lane Theatre, London, 1932.
- Once a Husband, Margot Neville & Brett Haye, The Haymarket, London, 1932.
- Julius Caesar and Twelfth Night, William Shakespeare, The Shakespeare Memorial Theatre, Stratford-Upon-Avon, 1932.
- Wild Violets, Hassard Short, Drury Lane Theatre, London, 1932.
- The Last of Mrs. Cheyney, Frederick Lonsdale, The Tower Arms, Iver, Buckinghamshire, 1932.
- Merchant of Venice, William Shakespeare, The Shakespeare Memorial Theatre, Stratford-Upon-Avon, 1932.
- The Dubarry, Eric Maschwitz, His Majesty's Theatre, London, 1932.
- Double Harness, Edward Poor Montgomery, Leeds Grand Theatre, Leeds, 1933.
- The Ace, Hermann Rossman/Miles Malleson, Lyric Theatre, London, 1933.
- Ballerina, Rodney Ackland, The Gaiety Theatre, London, 1933.
- After Dark, Ronald Jeans, The Vaudeville, London, 1933.
- This Side Idolatry, Talbot Jennings, The Lyric Theatre, London, 1933.
- Acropolis, Robert E. Sherwood, The Lyric Theatre, London. 1933.
- The Rats of Norway, Keith Winter, The Playhouse, 1933.
- On Approval, Frederick Lonsdale, The Strand Theatre, London, 1933.
- Mr. Whittington, Jack Waller and Jack Buchanan, The Alhambra, Glasgow, 1933.
- Before Sunset, Gerhardt Hauptmann/Miles Malleson, The Shaftesbury Theatre, London, 1933.
- The Tempest, Love's Labour Lost, Julius Caesar, Henry V, Shakespeare Memorial Theatre, Stratford-upon-Avon, 1934.
- Touch Wood, C.L. Anthony (Dodie Smith), The Haymarket Theatre, London, 1934.
- The Shinning Hour, Keith Winter, St. James's Theatre, London, 1934.
- The Wise Woman, Leslie Storm, The Criterion, London, 1934.
- Anthony and Cleopatra, The Merchant of Venice, As You Like It, Henry IV, The Tempest, All's Well That Ends Well, Shakespeare Memorial Theatre, Stratford-Upon-Avon, 1935.
- Accidentally Yours, Maurice Hennequin/Richard Grey, Theatre Royal Birmingham, 1935.
- The Ringmaster, Keith Winter, Shaftesbury, London, 1935.
- Vintage Wine, Seymour Hicks/Ashley Dukes, The Victoria Palace Theatre, London, 1935.
- Worse Things Happen at Sea, Keith Winter, Opera House, Manchester, 1935.
- Much Ado About Nothing, The Merchant of Venice, The Taming of the Shrew, Shakespeare Memorial Theatre, Stratford-Upon-Avon, 1936.
- Winter Opera Season, Sir Thomas Beecham/Music Drama Company, Convent Garden, 1936.
- Heart's Content, W. Chetham Strode/Raymond Massey, The Shaftesbury Theatre, London, 1936.
- The Amazing Dr. Clitterhouse, Barré Lyndon, The Haymarket Theatre, London, 1936.
- Wise Tomorrow, Stephen Powys, The Lyric Theatre, London, 1937.
- London After Dark, Walter Hackett, The Apollo Theatre, London, 1937.
- The Laughing Cavalier, Reginald Arkell/Stafford Byrne, The Adelphi Theatre, London, 1937.
- Orchard Walls, Merton Hodge, St. James’ Theatre, London, 1937.
- Don Juan de Manara, Eugene Goossen, Convent Garden, London, 1937.
- Henry V, Shakespeare Memorial Theatre, Stratford-Upon-Avon, 1937.
- To Have and To Hold, Lionel Brown, The Haymarket, 1937.
- I Can Take It, Theatre Royal, Birmingham, 1939.
- Giving the Bride Away, St. Martin's Theatre, London, 1939.
- Come to Play, Jessie Matthews/Sonnie Hale, The Phoenix Theatre, 1940.

== List of cinema and television productions designed by Hammond ==
- Hyde Park Corner, Walter C. Hackett/Sinclair Hill, Grosvenor Films, Welwyn Studios, U.K., 1935.
- The Cardinal, D.B. Wyndham-Lewis/Sinclair Hill, Grosvenor Films, Welwyn Studies, U.K., 1936.
- Mr. Pickwick, Albert Coates, BBC, Alexandra Palace, London, 1936.
- Housemaster, Ian Hay, The Apollo Theatre, London, 1936.
- Take A Chance, Sinclair Hall/D.B. Wyndham-Lewis, Grosvenor Films, 1936.
- The Gay Adventure, Monty Banks/D.B. Wyndham-Lewis, Grosvenor Films, 1936.
- Books Containing Illustrations and/or Covers Designed by Hammond
- Louis Golding, Seacoast of Bohemia, 1923.
- Lewis Melville, Beau Brummell: His Life and Letters, 1924.
- Lewis Melville, The London Scene, 1926.
- Lewis Melville, Regency Ladies, 1926.
- Lewis Melville, The Star of Piccadilly, 1927.
- Lewis Melville, Maids of Honour, 1927.
- Lewis Melville, The Windsor Beauties, 1928.
- Lewis Melville, Not All the Truth, 1928.
- Hayter Preston, Collisions, 1924.
- Peter Triall, Under the Cherry Tree, 1926.
- Magdalen King-Hall, I Think I Remember, 1927.
- Nash's and Pall Mall, Magazine, Illustrations by Hammond, 1926.
- Annual Stage Guild Ball, (Programme Illustrations)), 1927.
- Malcolm Douglas Lyon, A Village Match and After, (London: Eveleigh, Nash & Grayson) 1929.
- Henry Savage, How to Manage Our Women, (London: Humphrey Toulmin) 1930.
- Reginald le May, Siamese Tales: Old and New, (London: Noel Douglas) 1930.
- William Henry Leverton, Through the Box-Office Window: Fifty Years at the Haymarket Theatre,(London: T.W. Laurie Ltd), 1932.
- Maynard Greville, A Diary of Mister Niggs, (London: Ivor Nicholson & Watson), 1932.

== Selected exhibitions ==
- Poster Exhibition, Solo, Bond Street,
- Poster Exhibition, Solo, Derby Art Gallery, 1927.
- Poster Exhibition, Contributor, Victoria and Albert Museum, 1931.
- Exhibition of Stage and Costume Designs, The Redfern Gallery, Cork Street, London, 1938.
- International Theatre Art, Imperial Palace, Vienna, Austria, 1936.
- The Theatre Art Exhibition, Winnipeg, Canada, 1938.

== Selected posters and advertising ==
- Ramsgate, Hoarding and Rail tourism advertisement, 1926.
- Bolshewitches, Unionist Party,
- Advert for London Underground- To the Concert Hall,
- Curtain for the Lyceum Theatre, 1925, caricatures of well-known men and women, including Lloyd George, Churchill, Balfour, and Lady Astor and Oxford. Illustrated in the Sphere
- Advert for Sarony Cigarettes (graphic illustration of dancers)
- Surround Window Poster, James Moon’s shop, London, 1925.
- Canadian Club Whiskey, Newspaper Advertisement Series, ‘In Victoria’s Days’, 1926. And Others.
- Barclay’s Lager, Print Advertisement, 1925.
- Illustrations for The Bystander,
- Illustrations for The Graphic,
- Canadian Club Whiskey, 27 Cockspur Street, ‘distinctive to the nth degree’
- Model Scenery and Costume Design, Blackfriars Theatre, London, 1927.
- The Pow-Pow, (Hector Powe Ltd), Illustrations, 1930.
- Ideal homes Exhibition, ‘Famous Rooms from Literary Fiction.’, Olympia, London, 1931.
- Theatre Advertising Poster, ‘Millie’ and ‘The Queen’s Husband’, London Underground, 1931.
- Cadbury’s Chocolate Box Design, 1932.
- Sands Across the Sea, Southern Railway Company. Holiday Guide/Travel Guide, 1938.
- Brighton Official Handbook, Brighton Corporation Publicity Department, 1938-9.
