= The Giant Jam Sandwich =

1972 picture book

- Author: John Vernon Lord and Janet Burroway
- Illustrator: John Vernon Lord
- Cover artist: John Vernon Lord
- Genre: Children's picture book
- Publisher: Houghton Mifflin
- Publication date: 1972
- Publication place: United Kingdom
- Media type: Hardback and Paperback
- Pages: 32
- ISBN: 0-395-44237-0
- OCLC: 21135386
- Dewey Decimal: [E] 22
- LC Class: PZ8.3.L88 Gi 1972

The Giant Jam Sandwich is a children's picture book, with story and pictures by John Vernon Lord and verses by Janet Burroway. The rhyming story tells how the fictional town of Itching Down was invaded by four million wasps. At first, the villagers are unsure what to do, until Bap, the town baker, points out that wasps like strawberry jam, so they decide to build a gigantic jam sandwich to trap the pesky insects. It works, even though only 3,999,997 of them get trapped while the last three fly off in fear, never to return. The villagers celebrate, and the sandwich is carried off by the birds.

A narrated orchestral work on the book was written in 2008 by composer Philip Wharton. Janet Burroway was at its premier and has since been the narrator at other performances. An adaptation by New Perspectives Theatre premiered in 2017.
