= Centre for Excellence in Teaching and Learning through Design =

British higher education initiative

The Centre for Excellence in Teaching and Learning through Design (CETLD) is a higher education initiative that seeks to advance higher education through design.

CETLD was created in 2005, a Higher Education Funding Council for England (HEFCE)-funded partnership between the University of Brighton Faculty of Arts and Architecture, the Royal College of Art, the Royal Institute of British Architects and the Victoria & Albert Museum.

The centre was established as a five-year project, developed to enhance learning and teaching in design through research that brings together resources and expertise from Higher Education and collections-based partners.

Its objectives included the advance of understanding, practice-based learning, interdisciplinarity in design education, student voice and student-centred approaches to learning, use and application of collections.

The Centres for Excellence in Teaching and Learning respond to the British Department of Education and Science and the Department for Education and Employment visions for "purposefully linking learning institutions and providers--including universities, libraries, museums and galleries--in the development of a `learning society.'"

There are 74 British national Centres for Excellence in Teaching and Learning.
