= University of Brighton =

University in England

- Type: Public
- Established: 1858; 168 years ago (as Brighton College of Art); 1992; 34 years ago (university status)
- Affiliations: University Alliance; Universities UK
- Endowment: £0.1 million (2022)
- Budget: £193.5 million (2021–22)
- Vice-Chancellor: Donna Whitehead
- Total staff: 2,400
- Students: 17,405 (2024/25)
- Undergraduates: 14,150 (2024/25)
- Postgraduates: 3,255 (2024/25)
- Location: Brighton, England
- Website: brighton.ac.uk

The University of Brighton is a public university based in Brighton on the south coast of England. Its roots can be traced back to 1858 when the Brighton School of Art was opened in the Royal Pavilion. It achieved university status in 1992.

The university focuses on practical, creative, and professional education, with the majority of degrees awarded also recognised by professional organisations or leading to professional qualifications. Subjects include pharmacy, engineering, ecology, computing, art, architecture, geology, nursing, teaching, sport science, journalism, criminology and business. It has around 18,000 students and 2,400 staff. The QS World University Rankings places the university within the top 100 internationally for Art and Design.

== History ==
=== 1858—1900: Early years ===
In 1858 the Brighton School of Art opened its doors to its first 110 students, in rooms by the kitchens of the Royal Pavilion. It moved in 1876 to its own building in Grand Parade, with the Prime Minister, William Gladstone, witnessing the laying of the new building's foundation stone.

The Municipal School of Science and Technology opened in Brighton in 1897 with 600 enrolled students. In the 1960s new buildings were constructed in Moulsecoomb for what had become the Brighton College of Technology. In 1970 the School of Art and Brighton College of Technology merged to form Brighton Polytechnic.

What became known as the Chelsea College of Physical Education opened in 1898 in London under the headship of Dorette Wilkie. A two year course was offered where teachers were taught to teach. The college moved to Eastbourne in 1947. In 1976 it merged with Eastbourne and Seaford Colleges of Education to form the East Sussex College of Higher Education. The same year, Brighton College of Education (the teacher training college) merged with Brighton Polytechnic, giving the Polytechnic a campus at Falmer. It had opened in 1909 as the Municipal Day Training College in Richmond Terrace, Brighton.

=== 1900—2000: University status ===
There was a further merger in 1979, when the East Sussex College of Higher Education merged with the polytechnic, creating a campus in Eastbourne. That institution had opened in London in 1898 as an institution training women and girls in physical education and moved to Eastbourne in 1949.

UK polytechnics were granted university status in 1992 and Brighton Polytechnic became the University of Brighton under the provisions of the Further and Higher Education Act 1992.

In 1994 the Sussex and Kent Institute of Nursing and Midwifery became part of the university, increasing the number of students based in Eastbourne.

=== 2000—present ===
In 2003 the Brighton and Sussex Medical School opened as a partnership between the University of Brighton, the University of Sussex and the Universities Hospitals Trust, the first medical school in South East England outside London.

A Hastings campus was opened in 2003, originally named University Centre Hastings; it was subsequently closed in 2019.

In 2011, the Brighton International College, part of Kaplan International Colleges, opened on the Moulsecoomb campus, to provide international students with English language courses and preparatory academic tuition for undergraduate and postgraduate courses.

In October 2019 the university launched the first new contemporary publics arts space in the city since 1999, named the Brighton Centre for Contemporary Arts. Brighton CCA is accessible to students and the public, hosting public exhibitions, events and commissioned work.

In 2023, students and staff protested in opposition to the university's plans to make 110 staff redundant. The protests ultimately failed to prevent redundancies and 104 lecturers were made redundant, through 82 voluntary redundancies and 22 compulsory redundancies.

In May 2023, the university's Centre for Contemporary Arts was closed, the university says this is due to rising inflation, the "tuition fee freeze", and high energy costs.

== Campuses and facilities ==
The university currently has three campuses: Falmer, City and Moulsecoomb.

In 2018, the University of Brighton gained a first class award in the People & Planet's University League table – UK universities ranked by environmental and ethical performance.

=== Falmer campus, Brighton ===
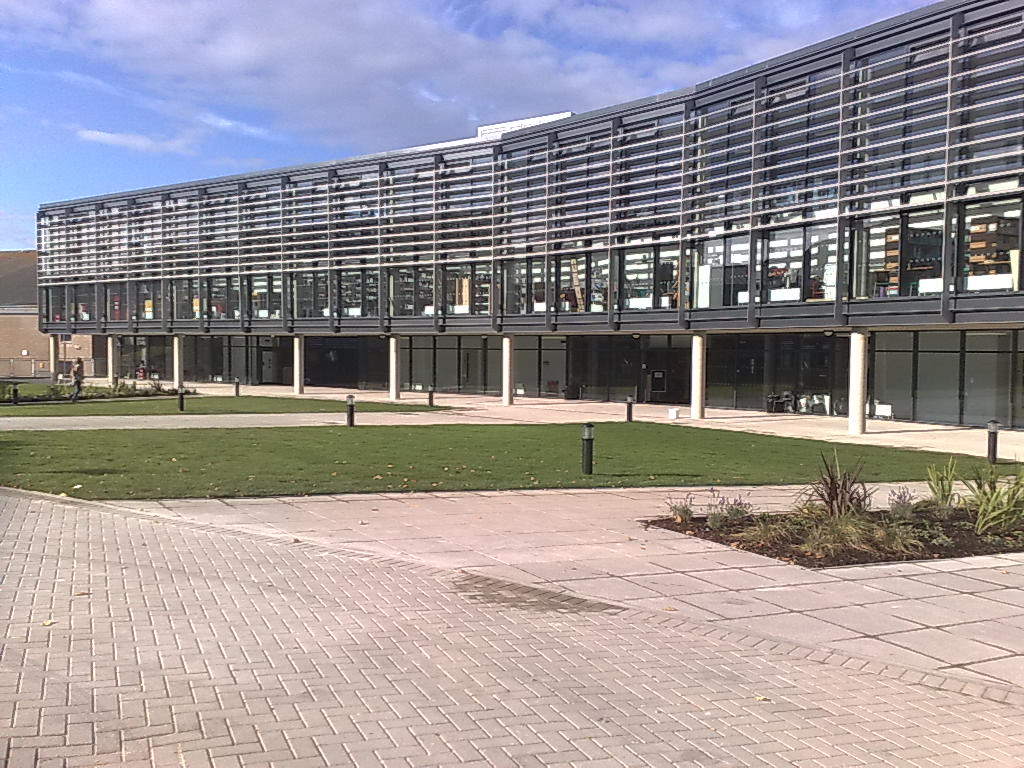
The Checkland Building at Falmer campus opened in 2009

The Falmer campus is approximately three miles from Brighton city centre. The School of Education, School of Humanities and Social Sciences, School of Sport and Health Sciences, Centre for Nursing and Midwifery Research, International Health Development and Research Centre, Social Science Policy and Research Centre, Education Research Centre, the Centre for Learning and Teaching and the Brighton and Sussex Medical School are all based on this campus.

Falmer railway station is immediately adjacent, as is the Falmer Stadium, home to Brighton & Hove Albion FC, which opened in 2011.

Facilities on the Falmer campus include a library, computer pool rooms, restaurant and cafe/bar. Sports facilities on the campus include floodlit 3G AstroTurf pitch, netball and tennis courts, a sports centre with fitness suite, two activity studios and a sports hall with six badminton courts, and a new sports pavilion which opened in 2015.

=== City campus, Brighton ===
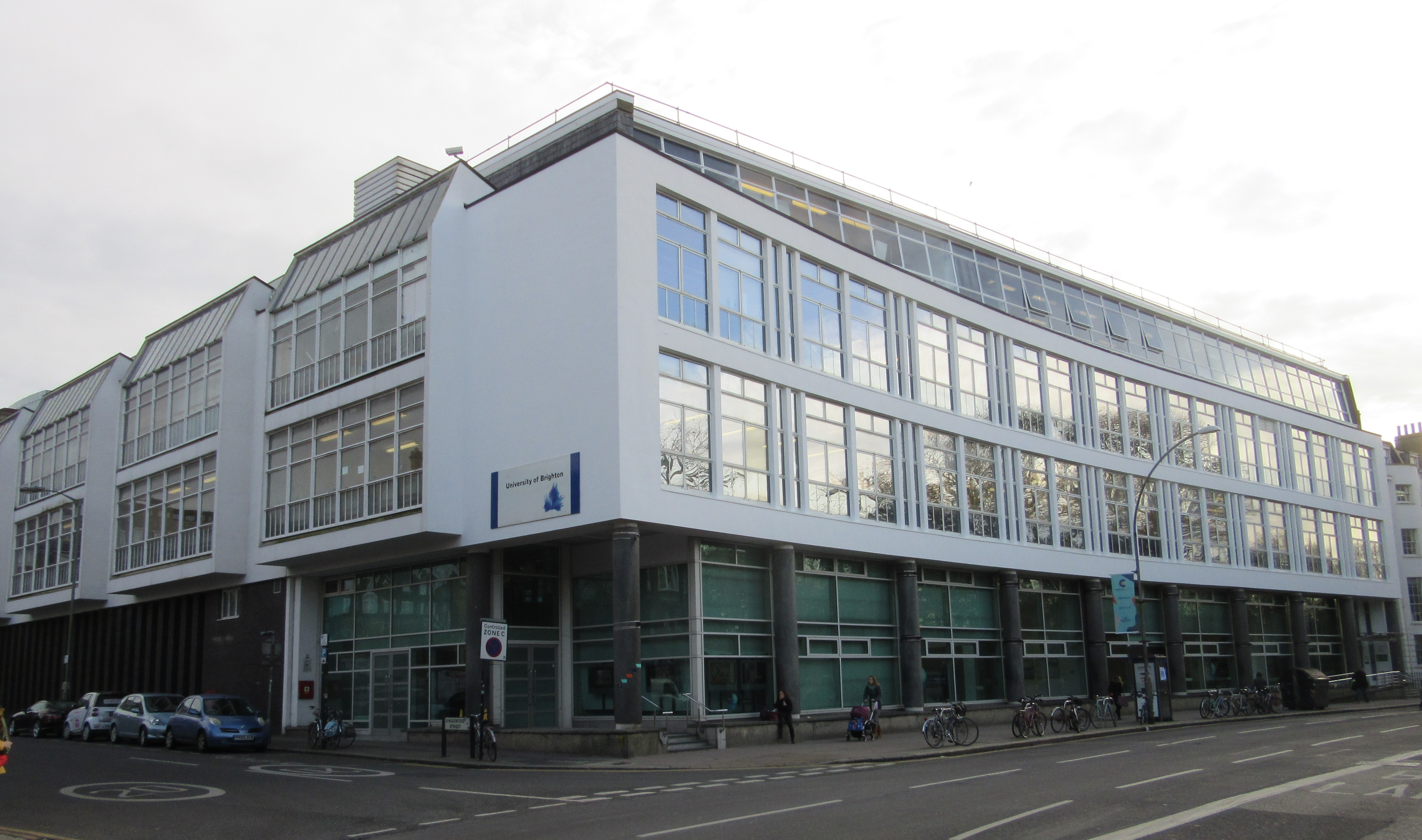
Grand Parade Building, designed by Percy Billington between 1962 and 1967 for Brighton Polytechnic

City campus in Brighton city centre is home to the university's School of Art and Media, (formerly the Faculty of Arts), the School of Humanities and Social Science, the University of Brighton gallery and Sallis Benney Theatre (presumably named after E. A. Sallis Benney, former principal of the Brighton School of Art).

The university's archives include the University of Brighton Design Archives, which houses collections from the Design Council and other British and global design organisations, and the moving image archive Screen Archive South East. Facilities include the specialist humanities, art and design library at St Peter's House, computer pool rooms, a media centre, a restaurant and cafe.

=== Moulsecoomb campus, Brighton ===
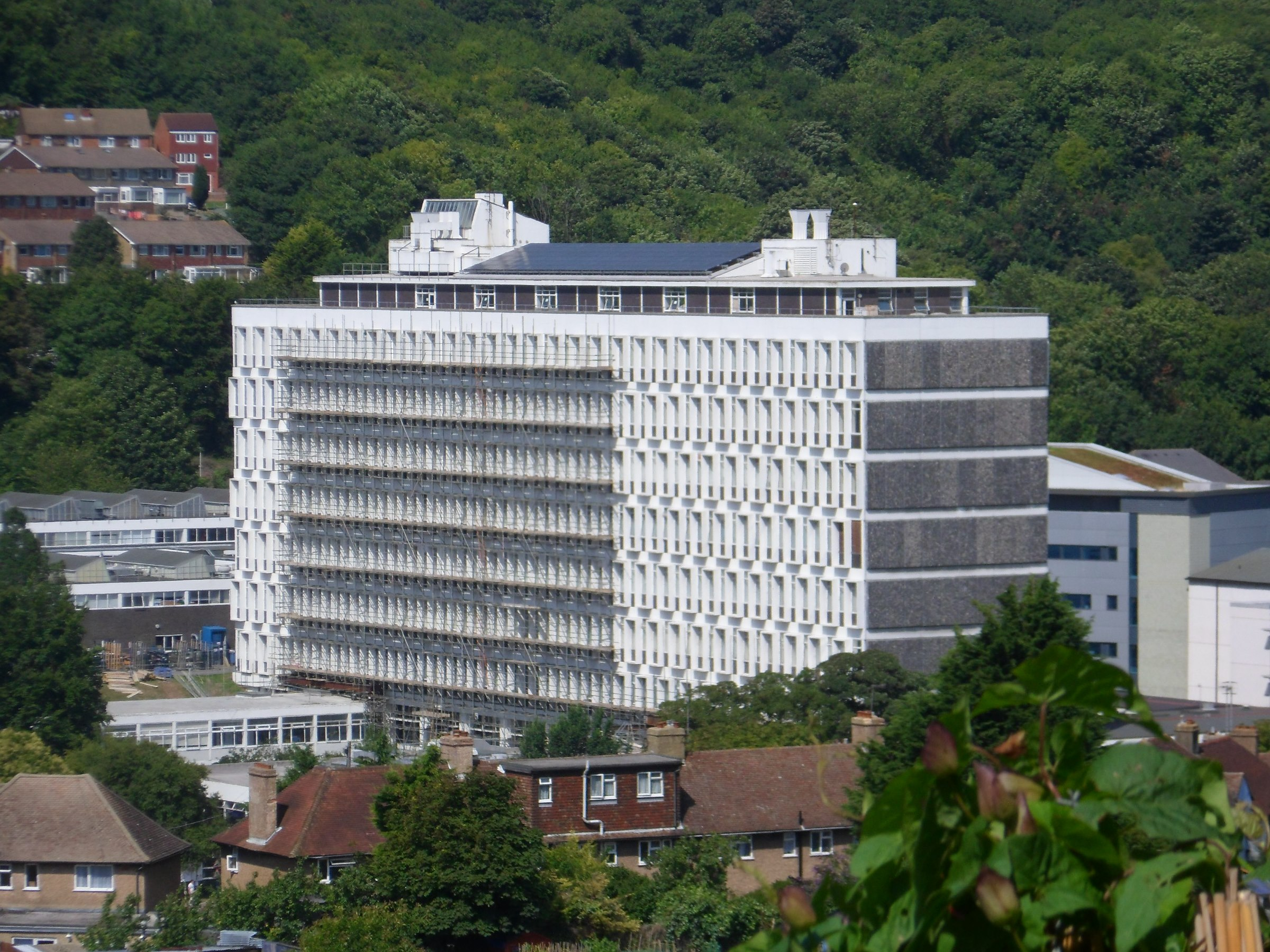
Built in 1962–63 for Brighton Polytechnic (now the University of Brighton), the Cockcroft Building is now one of the university's main buildings.

The Moulsecoomb campus is to the north of Brighton city centre on Lewes Road. Moulsecoomb railway station is nearby. It is the largest of the three campuses with over 8,000 students based there in the School of Applied Sciences; the School of Architecture, Technology and Engineering; and the School of Business and Law.

Teaching and learning resources include rapid prototyping and design equipment including 3D scanners, CNS lathes and laser cutters, clinical skills and molecular biology laboratories, specialist labs for structural dynamics, geotechnics, thermal dynamics, hydraulics and avionics, a flight simulator, real-time trading room, and architecture and interior architecture studios. Facilities include Aldrich Library, computer pool rooms, two restaurants and five cafes. The new advanced engineering building opened in September 2017, and Elm House opened in 2021.

The University of Brighton and Ricardo UK jointly opened the Sir Harry Ricardo Laboratories on 14 November 2006. The laboratories are one of the largest UK research teams dedicated to internal combustion engines, the development of laser-based measurement techniques, fundamental modelling and computational simulation.

The University of Brighton Students' Union has its main offices in Cockcroft Building.

=== Eastbourne ===
The Eastbourne campus was in the south-western part of the town of Eastbourne, and had almost 3,000 students before its closure in 2024.

Teaching and learning facilities at Eastbourne campus included exercise physiology laboratories, an environmental chamber, a human movement laboratory and the Leaf Hospital podiatry and physiotherapy clinic. Study facilities in Eastbourne included Queenwood library, computer pool rooms, a learning technologies suite, restaurants, and a students' Union shop. Sports facilities included a 25-metre swimming pool, sports hall, artificial outdoor pitch and dance studio.

The university closed this campus in 2024.

=== Libraries ===
The university has three libraries spread around its campuses.

- Aldrich Library (Moulsecoomb campus)
- Falmer Library
- St. Peter's House Library (City campus)

Each library is typically open between 55 and 68 hours per week, including evenings and weekends.

== Organisation and administration ==
The university is organized in academic schools:

- School of Applied Sciences
- School of Architecture, Technology and Engineering
- School of Art and Media
- Brighton and Sussex Medical School – joint with University of Sussex
- School of Business and Law
- School of Education
- School of Humanities and Social Science
- School of Sport and Health Sciences

=== Medical school ===
The Brighton and Sussex Medical School is one of four medical schools to have been created as part of the UK government's strategy of increasing the number of qualified doctors from the UK working in the NHS. The school is a joint school of the University of Brighton and the University of Sussex. The University of Brighton provides professional aspects of the course while the University of Sussex provides biological science teaching.

=== School of Business and Law ===
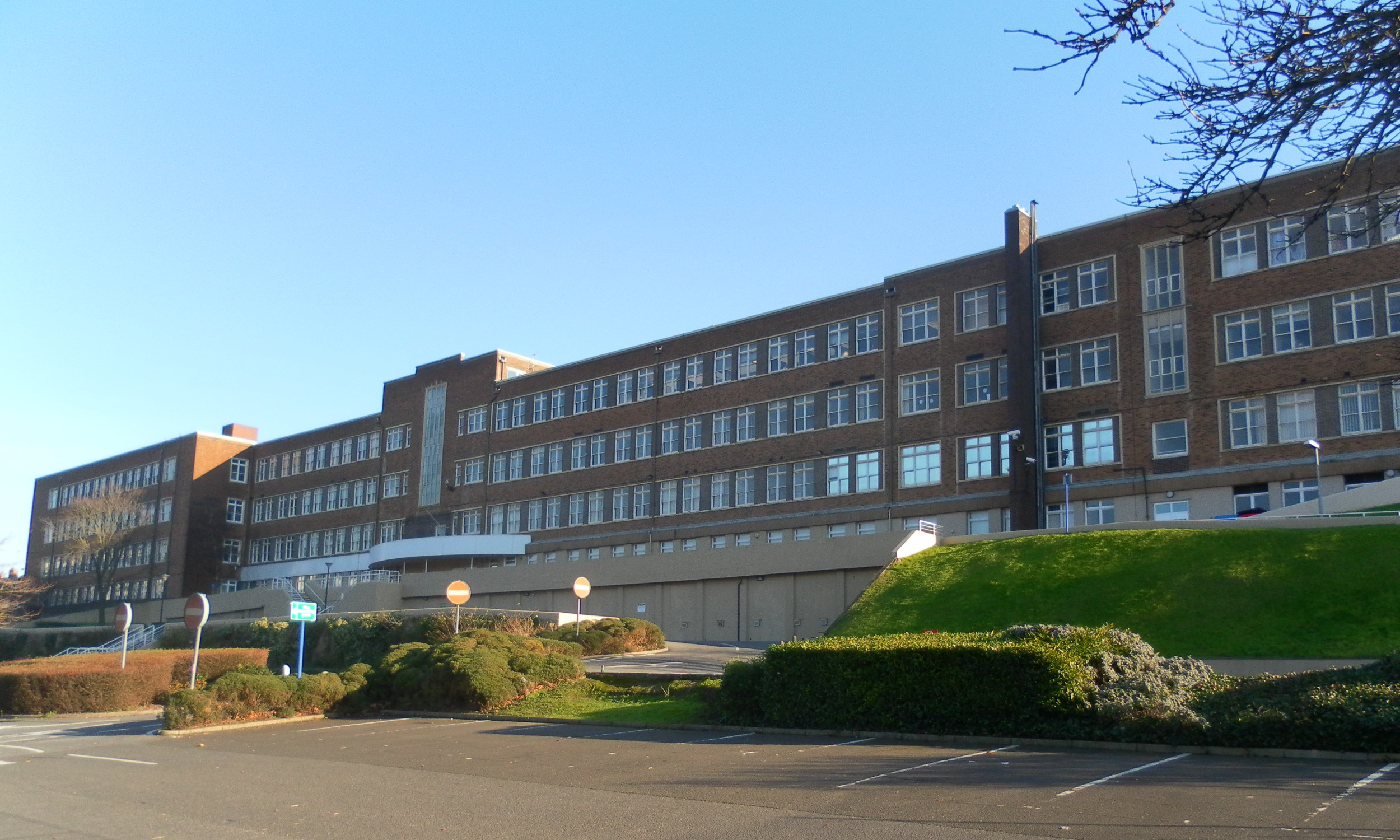
Mithras House, built as an administrative and design office for the Allen West electrical engineering company

The School of Business and Law delivers a wide range of undergraduate and postgraduate degrees, part-time courses for professionals, and programmes for commercial organisations. Formerly part of Brighton Technical College, the school has been teaching business and management courses since the 1960s. It took its current name in 1986. The school is in Elm House on the Moulsecoomb campus, following a large redevelopment.

The University of Brighton is accredited by the Association to Advance Collegiate Schools of Business (AACSB) – an accreditation achieved by fewer than 6% of business schools globally.

== Academic profile ==
The University of Brighton offers over 400 courses in a wide range of subjects.

University of Brighton's International College provides academic preparatory programmes for students outside the EU. On successful completion of their programme and achievement of the required grades, students can progress to undergraduate and postgraduate degrees offered at the university.

University of Brighton Doctoral College provides academic, administrative and practical support for the university's community of postgraduate research students. There are Doctoral College campus centres on the Eastbourne and each of the Brighton campuses.

=== Partnerships ===
The university validates degree-level courses taught at a number of partner colleges.

- East Sussex College Group
- Greater Brighton Metropolitan College
- Plumpton College

The University of Brighton also validates higher education courses taught at the KLC School of Design, London.

=== Reputation and rankings ===
Rankings
National rankings
- Complete (2027): 104
- Guardian (2026): 110
- Times / Sunday Times (2026): 90=

Global rankings
- QS (2027): 901–950
- THE (2026): 601–800

The university's Community University Partnership Programme received an honourable mention at the 2010 Community-Campus Partnerships for Health awards and was highly commended in the Social Responsibility category at the 2009 Green Gown Awards.

Brighton is in the top 50 universities in England for graduate prospects in the Complete University Guide league tables – reflecting the number of graduates who are in highly skilled employment or further study 15 months after they graduate.

The university gained a Silver award in the national Teaching Excellence Framework 2023, recognising the quality of their teaching and student outcomes.

The 2008 Research Assessment Exercise confirmed that 79% of the University of Brighton's research output is of international standing. Taking the top three grades, the results show that 15 per cent of the research is 'world-leading' (the highest grade), 29 per cent is internationally excellent (the second highest grade) and 35 per cent is internationally recognised (the third highest grade). The university's RAE ranking rose from 80th place in 2001 to 59th in 2008, leading it to be described as one of the "rising stars" in the UK. Sixty-five per cent of research in art and design at the Faculty of Arts was classified as either "world-leading" or "internationally excellent". This places Brighton amongst the leading research centres in the country for art and design and Research Fortnight ranked the submission second in terms of the volume and quality of research. Brighton is also ranked as one of the leading modern universities in terms of the quality of its research by the Research Fortnight newsletter.

== Research centres and groups ==
- Advanced Engineering Centre: The university is known for its contributions in automotive engineering, for example developing the 2/4 SIGHT Engine. The automotive engineering course is offered jointly with the University of Sussex. In the 2008 Research Assessment Exercise, the Automotive Engineering research group had 70% of its research rated internationally excellent or world leading and 95% deemed to be internationally recognised.

== Student life ==
Students on each campus have access to services including a careers advisory service, counselling service, student advice service, disability and dyslexia service, and chaplaincy.

Brighton Students' Union is the representative body for students. The BSU is a charity and is headed up by four full-time elected student officers. The BSU represent the student voice at the university, ensuring that they're using student feedback to make positive changes that make student life better. They support students with appeals, mitigating circumstances and other academic issues that may occur.

The BSU also organises a variety of activities and events throughout the year; including societies, student media and more. Buzz Radio is a student-led campus radio station with studios in Brighton. There are a number of shops and cafés across University of Brighton campuses that are run by the BSU.

== Notable alumni, staff and associates ==
Many prominent figures in the arts have attended the university, or the institutions from which it was formed. These include Turner Prize winners Keith Tyson and Rachel Whiteread (1982–85) studied at the Faculty of Arts, Brighton, as did Keith Coventry, the winner of 2010 John Moores Painting Prize, the photographer Ewen Spencer, the artist Alison Lapper, the designer Julien Macdonald and the writer-illustrator Emily Gravett.

Former students also include the artists Paine Proffitt, cartoonist and musician Jonathan Lemon, Cliff Wright, illustrator of the Harry Potter books, the designer Julien Macdonald OBE, and musicians Natasha Khan, (who performs as Bat for Lashes), and The Haxan Cloak

The list of students, lecturers and researchers once at Brighton includes Kate Greenaway Medal winners Emily Gravett, Raymond Briggs and Quentin Blake; children's writer-illustrator Lucy Cousins; Magnum photographer Mark Power; fashion designer Barbara Hulanicki; world champion bridge player Sandra Landy; and adventurer and conservationist Holly Budge.

Liz Aggiss, the live artist, dance performer, choreographer and film maker, taught visual performance at Brighton from 1982. She became an Emeritus Professor of Visual Performance. Alison Bruce is the Professor of nuclear physics.

Contributions made to modern visual culture by Brighton Faculty of Arts and Architecture members include Royal Designer for Industry George Hardie's cover designs for Pink Floyd's The Dark Side of the Moon, and several series of Royal Mail stamps, and John Vernon Lord's sleeve for Deep Purple's Book of Taliesyn.

In 2000 a group of graduates from the BA Illustration course formed the successful Peepshow Collective.

The longer history of the school of art in Brighton includes the artists Conrad Heighton Leigh, and poster designer John Bellany. The artist Helen Chadwick took the sculpture course at Brighton Polytechnic (1973–76) and later returned to the institution to teach. The artist Cherryl Fountain also attended the polytechnic. The sculptor/woodcarver Robert Koenig, author of the woodcarving project Odyssey also studied on the sculpture course at the same time as Helen Chadwick. The sculptor Antony Gormley formerly taught at Brighton. Alexandra Gage, Viscountess Gage is a fine arts senior lecturer at Brighton.

=== List of vice-chancellors ===
- Sir David Watson (1992 to 2005)
- Julian Crampton CBE (2005 to 2015)
- Debra Humphris (2015 to 2025)
- Donna Whitehead (2025 to present)

== See also ==
- Armorial of UK universities
- List of universities in the United Kingdom
- Post-1992 universities
- University of Brighton Academies Trust
