= Angela Bracco =

Italian physicist

Angela Bracco (born 1955) is an Italian experimental nuclear physicist whose research has applied gamma spectroscopy to the study of nuclear structure. She is a professor of physics at the University of Milan, the president of the Italian Physical Society, and the president of the Centro Ricerche Enrico Fermi, a physics museum and research center in Rome.

== Education and career ==
Bracco was born in 1955 in Lecco. She earned a laurea (then the equivalent of a master's degree) in 1979 from the University of Milan, and completed a Ph.D. in 1983 in Canada, through a joint program of the TRIUMF national particle accelerator center in Vancouver and the University of Manitoba in Winnipeg.

She returned to the University of Milan as an assistant professor in 1983. She was promoted to associate professor in 1988 and full professor in 2002. She became president of the Italian Physical Society in 2000, and president of the Centro Ricerche Enrico Fermi in 2024.

== Book ==
Bracco is a coauthor of the book Giant Resonances: Nuclear Structure at Finite Temperature (with P.F. Bortigan and R.A. Brogila, Harwood Academic Publishers 1998 and Routledge 2019), on the topic of giant resonances.

== Recognition ==
Bracco was named to the Academia Europaea in 2016. She was elected as a Fellow of the American Physical Society (APS) in 2024, after a nomination from the APS Forum on International Physics, "for outstanding experimental research in the field of nuclear physics, and for remarkable leadership in organising, managing, and advancing physics on an international dimension". She is also a member of the Istituto Lombardo Accademia di Scienze e Lettere and of the Academy of Sciences of the Institute of Bologna.
