= Edgar Sanderson =

English cleric, schoolteacher & historical writer (1838-1907)

Edgar Sanderson (1838–1907) was an English cleric, schoolteacher and historical writer.

== Life ==
Born at Nottingham on 25 January 1838, he was son of Edgar Sanderson by his wife Eliza Rumsey; his father owned a lace-factory in Nottingham, and later kept schools at Stockwell and Streatham Common. The younger Sanderson was educated at the City of London School and at Clare College, Cambridge from 1856, where he won a scholarship. He graduated B.A. in 1860, proceeding M.A. in 1866.

After holding a mastership at King's Lynn grammar school, Sanderson was ordained deacon in 1862 and priest in 1863. At first curate of St. Dunstan's, Stepney, while master of Stepney grammar school, he held successively curacies at Burcombe-cum-Broadway in Dorset (with a mastership at Weymouth school), and at Chieveley, Berkshire. From 1870 to 1873 Sanderson was headmaster of Stockwell grammar school; from 1873 to 1877 of Macclesfield grammar school; and from 1877 to 1881 of Huntingdon grammar school.

Subsequently, Sanderson lived at Streatham Common, writing educational manuals and popular historical works. He died at 23 Barrow Road, Streatham Common, on 31 December 1907, and was buried at Norwood cemetery.

== Works ==
The British Empire in the 19th Century: its Progress and Expansion at Home and Abroad; comprising a description and history of the British colonies and dependencies, Volume VI

Sanderson's major works, which sold well, were:

- History of the British Empire, 1882; 20th edit. 1906. A handbook.
- Outlines of the World's History, Ancient, Mediaeval and Modern, 1885, issued both in four parts and in one volume; revised edit. 1910.
- History of the World from the Earliest Historical Time to 1898, 1898.
- The British Empire in the 19th Century: its Progress and Expansion at Home and Abroad, 6 vols. 1898-9 (with engravings and maps); reissued in 1901 as The British Empire at Home and Abroad.
- King Edward VII: His Life & Reign. The Record of a Noble Career, 6 vols. posthumously published 1910; completed by Lewis Melville.

== Family ==
Sanderson married in 1864 Laetitia Jane, elder daughter of Matthew Denycloe, surgeon, of Bridport. She died in October 1894, leaving two sons and four daughters.

== Notes ==
Attribution

This article incorporates text from a publication now in the public domain: Lee, Sidney, ed. (1912). "Sanderson, Edgar". Dictionary of National Biography (2nd supplement). Vol. 3. London: Smith, Elder & Co.
