= John Vernon Lord =

British artist

- Born: 9 April 1939 (age 87); Glossop, Derbyshire, England
- Occupations: Illustrator, writer, teacher
- Spouse: Lorna Deanna Trevelyan
- Children: Three

John Vernon Lord is an illustrator, author and teacher. He is widely recognized for his illustrations of various texts such as Aesop's Fables,The Nonsense Verse of Edward Lear; and the Folio Society's Myths and Legends of the British Isles. He has also illustrated classics of English literature, including the works of Lewis Carroll and James Joyce.

Lord has written and illustrated several books for children, which have been published and translated into multiple languages. His book The Giant Jam Sandwich has been in print since 1972.

He was head of various departments, including the Head of the School of Design, at Brighton Art School, Polytechnic and University. He is now Professor Emeritus at the University of Brighton where he was Professor of Illustration 1986-99. An Honorary D.Litt. was conferred upon him by the University of Brighton in 2000. He was the chair of the Graphic Design Board of the Council for National Academic Awards 1981-84.

== Background and education ==
John Vernon Lord was born in 1939 in Glossop, Derbyshire. He is the son of a baker and a ship's hairdresser. He attended Salford School of Art, now the University of Salford in Lancashire (1956–60); and completed his formal education at the Central School of Arts and Crafts in London, where he was taught by the modernist writer and artist Mervyn Peake and the surrealist Cecil Collins, amongst others. In his 2007 retrospective, Drawing Upon Drawing he states that,

"During (his) student days, in the late 1950s the work of Gerard Hoffnung, André François, Ronald Searle and Saul Steinberg...and, to a certain extent..the work of Paul Klee"

as was "an abiding interest" in Victorian steel engraving.

== Drawing for a living ==
In 1961, Lord began work as a freelance illustrator, joining the agents Saxon Artists, in New Oxford Street, London. This required him to draw on demand, day in and out, often for long hours. He described the difference between life as an art student and life as a professional illustrator in the following terms:

"As well as drawing the insides of stomachs, I tackled everything that came my way. I carried out portraits of company directors for their retirement dinner menu covers, buildings for brochures, strip cartoons, maps and humorous drawings for advertisements....gardens and their plants, vegetables, mazes, refrigerators, dishwashers, totem poles, kitchen utensils, resuscitation diagrams, all kinds of furniture, typewriters, agricultural crop spraying machines, door locks, folded towels, decorative letters, Zodiac signs, animals....When you are a student there is a tendency at first to limit yourself to draw only what you like drawing. This ultimately shackles you and limits your repertoire ...(it) narrows the margin of what you can depict in an image and consequently stifles imagination and ideas."

As a commercial artist, in 1968 Lord designed the album cover for The Book of Taliesyn by the band Deep Purple. The brief from the artist's agent is detailed in Drawing upon Drawing as follows:

"the agent gave me the title saying that the art director wanted a 'fantasy Arthurian touch' and to include hand lettering for the title and the musicians' names. I mainly drew from The Book of Taliesin, a collection of poems, said to be written by the sixth century Welsh bard Taliesin."[3]

== Brighton ==
In 1968, Lord became a teacher at Brighton College of Art (now the Faculty of Arts). He concentrated on the illustration of books. He was commissioned to illustrate the Adventures of Jabotí on the Amazon and Reynard the Fox and so began a love affair with narrative illustration. During the 1970s, while a teacher at Brighton, he wrote The Giant Jam Sandwich, The Runaway Roller Skate and Mr Mead and his Garden, and illustrated Conrad Aiken's Who's Zoo Lord produced several illustrations for Punch and the Radio Times. He wrote articles and gave public lectures on illustration as an art form. He began to work in black and white. In an article on cross hatching Lord writes:

"The whiteness of the paper already exists before you proceed to draw. It has established itself as a fundamental entity; a ground to tread on. What marks you make on the paper are as important as the marks you don't make; or is the opposite the case? The editing and selection of gap-making is fundamental to drawing. Nothingness, therefore, allows something else to exist. Planets move in space. Planets need space to move about in. Space doesn't need planets. The pencil (or whatever other drawing instrument you are using) clothes the naked surface of the paper with a network of marks and the paper often peeps through the drawing. A picture is made up of a balancing between the making, the removing, and the not-making of marks. Somehow a drawing represents the trails of a journey like, as Klee put it – 'taking a line for a walk', which is a far more conducive activity than taking a dog for a walk."

In 1986, he was appointed Professor of Illustration at University of Brighton and his inaugural lecture Illustrating Lear's Nonsense was published a few years later. Robert Mason reviewing Lord's lecture A Journey of Drawing An Illustration of a Fable writes:

Lord's fastidious verbal dissection of the process of making a single pen and ink illustration, The Crow And The Sheep, over a period of 11 hours and 11 minutes on the 10th and 11th of February 1985, was intimate and unique. Its very length, and its combination of intense focus interspersed with frequent digressions – about how to avoid actually working, the tendency of Rotring pens to clog, contemporary news topics (mortgage rate increases / African famines / American defence spending…) and the maximum and minimum temperatures of the days in question (minus 3 and minus 7 degrees Fahrenheit) made the audience feel at one with the process..."

== Gallery ==
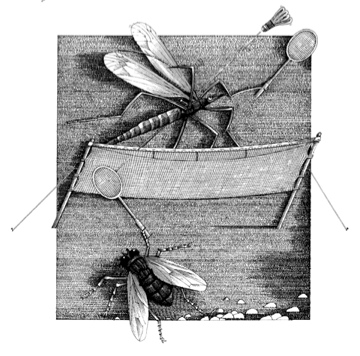
'The Daddy Long-legs and the Fly', The Nonsense Verse of Edward Lear, Jonathan Cape,1984.

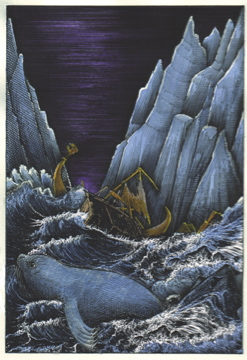
'The seal circles the boat all day', The Icelandic Sagas, The Folio Society, 2002.

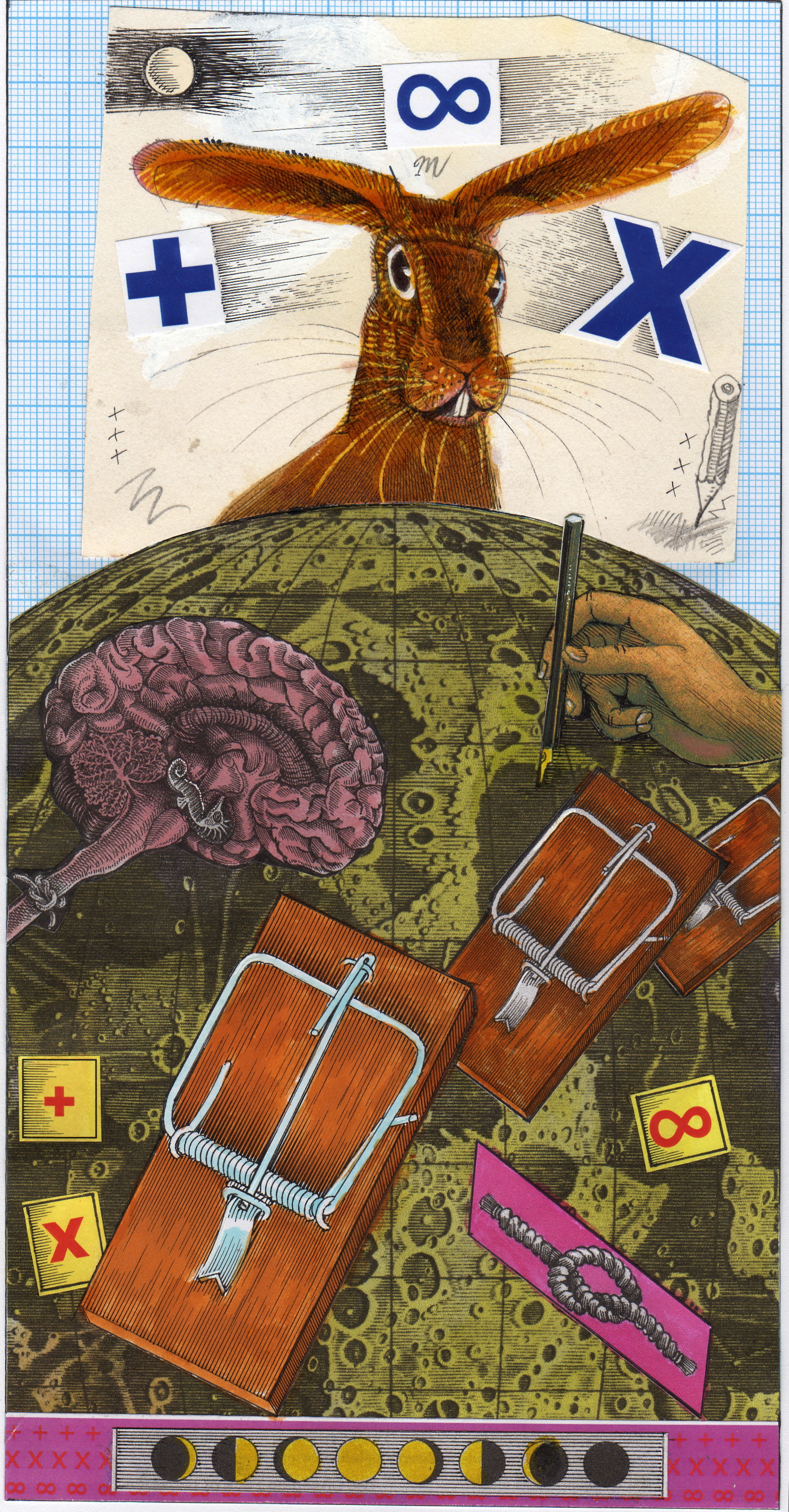
'A drawing of things beginning with M and Muchness', Alice's Adventures in Wonderland, Inky Parrot Press, 2009.

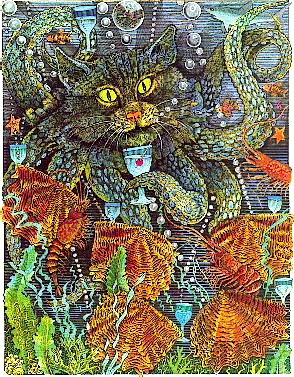
'Octopuss', Who's Zoo by Conrad Aiken, Jonathan Cape,1977.

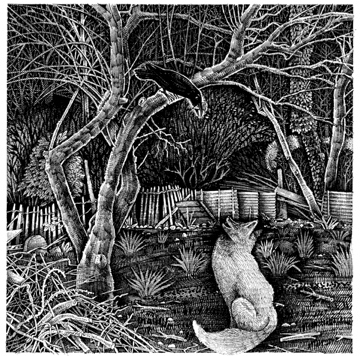
'The Fox and the Crow', Aesop's Fables, Jonathan Cape, 1989.

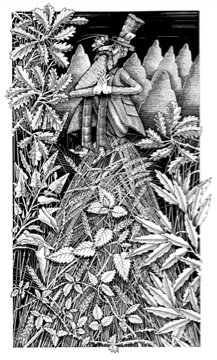
'Uncle Arly', The Nonsense Verse of Edward Lear, Jonathan Cape, 1984.

== Selected publications as an illustrator ==
- 1965 A Visit to Bedsyde Manor, by Stanley Penn, Guinness Publications.
- 1968 Adventures of Jabotí on the Amazon, by Lena F. Hurlong, Abelard-Schuman.
- 1969 Reynard the Fox, by Roy Brown, Abelard-Schuman.
- 1970 A Natural History of Man, by J.K. Brierley, Heinemann.
- 1970 The Truck on the Track, by Janet Burroway, Jonathan Cape.
- 1970 Dinosaurs Don't Die, by Ann Coates, Longman.
- 1972 The Adventures of Brer Rabbit, after Joel Chandler Harris, BBC Jackanory.
- 1975 Sword at Sunset, by Rosemary Sutcliff, (Edito-Service), Geneva.
- 1977 Who's Zoo, poems by Conrad Aiken, Jonathan Cape.
- 1984 The Nonsense Verse of Edward Lear, Jonathan Cape.
- 1989 The Song that Sings the Bird, poems chosen by Ruth Craft and illustrated by JVL, Collins.
- 1989 Aesop's Fables, verses by James Michie, Jonathan Cape.
- 1994 The Squirrel and the Crow, by Wendy Cope, 'Prospero Poets' series for the Clarion Press.
- 1995 King Arthur's Knights, by Henry Gilbert, Macmillan.
- 1998 Myths and Legends of the British Isles, edited by Richard Barber, The Folio Society.
- 2002 Icelandic Sagas, Volume 2, translated by Magnus Magnusson, The Folio Society.
- 2005 Epics of the Middle Ages, edited by Richard Barber, The Folio Society.
- 2006 The Hunting of the Snark, by Lewis Carroll, Artists' Choice Editions, The Foundry, Church Hanborough.
- 2009 Alice's Adventures in Wonderland, by Lewis Carroll, Artists' Choice Editions.
- 2011 Through the Looking-Glass and What Alice Found There, by Lewis Carroll, Artists' Choice Editions
- 2014 Finnegans Wake, by James Joyce, The Folio Society
- 2017 Ulysses, by James Joyce, The Folio Society
- 2020 Wagner’s Ring of the Nibelung: A Companion, English translation by Stewart Spencer, The Folio Society

== Books ==
- 1972, The Giant Jam Sandwich, set to verse by Janet Burroway, Jonathan Cape.
- 1973, The Runaway Roller Skate, Jonathan Cape.
- 1974, Mr Mead and his Garden, Jonathan Cape.
- 1979, Miserable Aunt Bertha, set to verse by Fay Maschler, Jonathan Cape.
- 1986, The Doodles and Diaries of John Vernon Lord, Camberwell Press.
- 2007, Drawing Upon Drawing: 50 Years of Illustrating, University of Brighton.
- 2009, John's Journal Jottings, Inky Parrott Press.
- 2014, Drawn to Drawing, by John Vernon Lord, Nobrow Press
- 2018, A Drawing a Day in 2016, by John Vernon Lord, with 366 illustrations by John Vernon Lord, Inky Parrott Press, Oxford, 2018
- 2018 John Vernon Lord: Illustrating Carroll and Joyce, catalogue to accompany an exhibition with a foreword by Chris Riddell and an introduction with 46 illustrations by JVL, The House of Illustration, London, 2018.
- 2019 John Lord’s Notebooks: DCC:451, a Keepsake for the Double Crown Club, Including 36 pages of notebook images by John Vernon Lord, Coventry and Warwickshire Print Ltd, December 2019.
- 2023 Random Notes about Doodling, Sketching, Drawing and Illustrating, by John Vernon Lord, with 6 short essays and many pages from sketchbooks and notebooks. Introduction by Brian Sibley, Studio 245, Unseen Sketchbooks, 2023.

== Awards ==
In 1985 his The Nonsense Verse of Edward Lear won the ‘Redwood Burn Award’ sponsored by the NBL and Publishers’ Association; and it also won the ‘General Selectors’ Award’ by the British Federation of Master Printers. In 1990 his illustrations for Aesop’s Fables won the overall prize in the ‘V&A/W.H Smith Illustration Awards’. In 2018 his illustrations for Ulysses won the ‘V&A Illustration Award for Book Illustration’ and the winner of the ‘2018 Moira Gemmill Illustrator of the Year Prize’.
