= Lewis Melville =

English author

Melville in 1927.

Lewis Saul Benjamin (pen name, Lewis Melville; 1874–1932) was an English author, born into a Jewish family in London, England and educated privately in England and Germany. From 1896 to 1901 he was known as an actor, though part of his time even then was devoted to literature. His publications include:

- The Life of William Makepeace Thackeray (two volumes, 1899)
- 20 vol. edition of Thackeray's works (editor, 1901–07)
- In the World of Mimes: A Theatrical Novel (1902)
- The Thackeray Country (1905)
- Victorian Novelists (1906)
- The First Gentleman of England (two volumes, 1906)
- Bath under Beau Nash (1907)
- The Beau of the Regency (1908)
- King Edward VII: His Life & Reign. The Record of a Noble Career (six volumes, 1910; with Edgar Sanderson)
- The Life and Letters of Laurence Sterne (two volumes, 1911; American edition, 1912)
- The Life and Letters of William Cobbett (two volumes, 1912; American edition, 1913)
- The Life and Writings of Philip, Duke of Wharton (1913)
- Lady Mary Wortley Montagu: Her Life and Letters (1689–1762), London: Hutchinson & Co., 1925
- Trial of the Duchess of Kingston (editor, 1927) Notable British Trials series
