= Little Golden Book Land =

1989 film

- Developed by: Phil Harnage
- Written by: Phil Harnage
- Directed by: Al Zegler
- Voices of: Tony Ail; Graham Andrews; Tony Balshaw; Dillan Bouey; Tony Dakota; Lelani Marrell; Imbert Orchard; Emily Perkins; Chiara Zanni
- Composers: Haim Saban; Shuki Levy
- Country of origin: United States
- Original language: English

Production
- Executive producers: Andy Heyward; Robby London
- Producer: Richard Raynis
- Editor: Lars Floden
- Running time: 24 minutes
- Production companies: DIC Animation City; Western Publishing

Original release
- Network: First-run syndication
- Release: March 24, 1989

Little Golden Book Land is an animated syndicated special produced by DIC Animation City and Western Publishing in 1989. The special stars many popular characters from the Little Golden Books, a beloved children's book series. It was possibly a pilot episode because of the theme song and credits at the beginning and end, for an animated TV show that never came to fruition. Its full title is Little Golden Book Land: The Great Harbor Rescue.

== Synopsis ==
Scuffy the Tugboat and his friends race against time to help fix the hole in the breakwater at Harbortown before the next storm arrives.

== Plot ==
Beamer the Old Lighthouse is worried because previous storms have battered the breakwater so much that the last storm broke a hole in it. He calls a meeting with the big ships. Overhearing the meeting and learning what's wrong, Scuffy the Tugboat promises to help fix the breakwater. The big ships laugh at him and Beamer orders them to stop. Scuffy is determined to prove that a little tugboat can do big things.

Later, Scuffy and explains the problem to his friends, Tootle, Katy Caboose, Poky Little Puppy, and Shy Little Kitten. Despite their fears about getting into trouble, they agree to help Scuffy. They have adventures on the way to get materials to fix the breakwater, during which Poky Little Puppy and Scuffy meet and tell Saggy Baggy Elephant about the breakwater and he agrees to help. He offers them his coconuts to fix the breakwater, but after Scuffy points out they need a rock, Saggy Baggy Elephant takes his friends along a path to Cavetown. Meanwhile, Tootle, Shy Little Kitten and Katy meet Tawny Scrawny Lion, who agrees to help. He offers them a big carrot to fix the breakwater, but Katy points out they need a big rock, and Tawny Scrawny Lion joins them on their journey to Cavetown.

They all make it through Cavetown Tunnel where they meet Baby Brown Bear, who helps his new friends by leading them to a big round rock perched on a mountaintop. Just as a storm starts, all friends with arms and legs push the rock off the mountaintop right down to Tootle. The rock blocks Katy and Tootle's passage on the tracks. After everybody gets back on board Tootle starts making a run for it. The rock then chases the friends down the track, creating a trail of destruction behind it.

Just as the storm is starting to batter the breakwater at Harbortown even further, Beamer catches sight of Tootle and orders the cargo ship to take action. The cargo ship puts some mattresses from his hold on the ground. Tootle then slams on her brakes and sends everything flying out of her cars. They all land on the mattresses, except for Scuffy who lands back in the water. The big rock lands squarely in the hole in the breakwater, plugging it up and preventing Harbortown from being flooded.

Eventually, the storm passes and Beamer hosts holds a party for Scuffy. He congratulates Scuffy for saving the day, but Scuffy gives the credit to all his friends. After Tawny Scrawny Lion makes a toast to Scuffy, Shy Little Kitten catches everybody's attention by spotting a rainbow in the sky.

== Themes ==
This special contained two themes. The first one was that even little people can do big things. Scuffy was little, but he did a big thing by saving Harbortown from getting flooded and Beamer from getting washed away. The second theme was the power of friendship. Scuffy knew he could not save the day alone, so he called on the help of his friends to help him put things right. The song "Get Up and Go" teaches the power of self-confidence.

== Advertisement ==
On every VHS release of Little Golden Book Land, a commercial for the bath toy Water Pets from Playskool is included in the middle of the story.

== Cast and characters ==
(in order of appearance)

- Imbert Orchard as Beamer the Old Lighthouse
- Tony Ail as Scuffy the Tugboat
- Dillian Bouey as Tootle the Train
- Chiara Zanni as The Poky Little Puppy
- Tony Balshaw as Shy Little Kitten
- Emily Perkins as Katy Caboose
- Graham Andrews as Tawny Scrawny Lion
- Lelani Marrell as Saggy Baggy Elephant
- Tony Dakota as Baby Brown Bear

== Crew ==
- Story: Phil Harnage
- Animation director: Shingo Kaneko
- Producer: Andy Heyward
- Music: Haim Saban and Shuki Levy
- Lyrics: Phil Harnage
- Director: Al Zegler

== Songs ==
This special featured three songs as listed below:

- "Little Golden Book Land Theme"
- "Get Up and Go"
- "Friends to the End"

== Aftermath ==
Little Golden Book Land was released on VHS in the 1990s by Golden Book Video. Shortly after the special's airing, a series of new Little Golden Books featuring the characters were written, based on the film:

- Welcome to Little Golden Book Land
- Tootle and Katy Caboose: A Special Treasure
- Poky Little Puppy's Special Day
- Shy Little Kitten's Secret Place
- Tawny Scrawny Lion Saves the Day
- Saggy Baggy Elephant: No Place for Me
- Scuffy's Underground Adventure
- Baby Brown Bear's Big Bellyache
- Saggy Baggy Elephant's Birthday
