= Poky and Friends =

- Written by: Bruce Talkington
- Directed by: Ramon Modiano
- Voices of: Rhonda Miller; Dan Russell; Barbara Barnes
- Composer: Terry Scabrook
- Countries of origin: Hungary; United Kingdom; United States
- Original language: English
- No. of seasons: 1
- No. of episodes: 15

Production
- Executive producer: Lauren Levine
- Producer: Andras Erkel
- Running time: 5 minutes
- Production companies: Varga Studio; TVC London; Golden Books Family Entertainment

Original release
- Network: Direct-to-video; Disney Channel (Playhouse Disney)
- Release: July 18 – July 27, 1999

Poky and Friends is a series of animated videos and books produced by Varga TVC Productions and Golden Books Family Entertainment that ran from 1998 until 2003.

== Summary ==
It is a spin-off of classic Little Golden Books characters (The Poky Little Puppy, The Shy Little Kitten, etc.), just like the animated special Little Golden Book Land, although the series featured different character designs for the characters to fit the animated series.

== Videos ==
Three Poky and Friends VHS tapes, each consisting of five episodes, were released on July 27, 1999 by Sony Wonder. Individual episodes were also shown on Disney Channel's Playhouse Disney block as post-show interstitials from 1999 to 2003.

- Poky and Friends – Poky Little Puppy
- Poky and Friends – Saggy Baggy Elephant
- Poky and Friends – Scuffy the Tugboat

The videos were also released on DVD by Classic Media.

== Books ==
- Poky and Friends – Tails of Friendship
- Poky and Friends – Lucky Ducks
- Poky and Friends – Out and About (Coloring Book)
- Poky and Friends – The Haunted Tracks
- Poky and Friends – The Truth About Kittens and Puppies
- Poky and Friends – Big River Rescue
- Poky and Friends – Friends and Fun
- Poky and Friends – Come Play with Us
- Poky and Friends – Poky's Bathtime Adventure
