= Signal (disambiguation) =

A signal is any variation of a medium that conveys information.

Signal or signaling may also refer to:

== Science and technology ==
- Analog signal
- Audio signal
- Digital signal
  - Digital signal (signal processing)
- Cell signaling, in biology
- Signalling (economics), in economics theory
- Signal processing, subfield of electrical engineering
- Signalling theory, in evolutionary biology
- Time signal

=== Computing ===
- SIGNAL (programming language), a synchronous programming language
- Signal (IPC), a form of inter-process communication used in Unix and related operating systems
  - C signal handling, a way for handling signals received by programs during their execution
- Signals and slots, a form of communication among objects in the Qt environment
- A term in functional reactive programming

=== Communications ===
- Military communications, often called "signals"
  - Signal corps, military branch responsible for military communications
- Recognition signal in human, technical or biological communications
- Signal (software), an end-to-end encrypted messaging application
  - Signal Protocol, a cryptographic protocol used by the Signal application
- Signaling protocol to establish or tear down a connection, and to identify the state of the connection
- Signaling (telecommunications), a part of some communication protocols
- Smoke signal, an ancient form of communication
- Telegraphic signal, in telegraphy

==== Communication for transport ====
- International Code of Signals, a standard for sending signals by displaying flags
  - Maritime flag signalling, generally flaghoist signalling, by which ships communicate with each other
  - Naval flag signalling, covers various forms of flag signalling, such as semaphore or flaghoist
- Railway signal
- Traffic light (traffic signal)

== Arts and entertainment ==
=== Books and magazines ===
- Signal (magazine), a Wehrmacht propaganda magazine which was published in occupied Europe during World War II
- SIGNAL (US magazine), publication of the Armed Forces Communications and Electronics Association
- Signal, a New York Yiddish-language literary monthly published from 1933 to 1936 by the Communist Party USA
- Signal (novel), a 2009 children's novel about a boy who helps a girl from another planet signal her parents

=== TV and movies ===
- Signal (South Korean TV series), a 2016 South Korean police procedural TV series
- Signal (Japanese TV series), a 2018 Japanese police procedural TV series based on the 2016 South Korean series of the same name
- Signal, Wyoming, a fictional town from the 2005 film Brokeback Mountain
- "Signals", a 2005 episode of the animated television series 12 oz. Mouse

=== Music ===
- Signal (band), a Bulgarian rock band
- Signal – The Southeast Electronic Music Festival, an annual music festival held in the US

==== Albums ====
- Signal, a 2005 album by Casiopea
- Signals (Mal Waldron album), 1971
- Signals (Mallory Knox album), the début album of the Mallory Knox band
- Signals (Rush album), 1982
- Signals (Wayne Krantz album), 1990
- Signals, an album by American band Devour the Day
- Signal (EP), a 2017 extended play by South Korean girl group Twice
- Signals (Bini EP), 2026
- Signals (Madeline Kenney EP), 2016

==== Songs ====
- "Signal" (KAT-TUN song), a 2006 song by KAT-TUN
- "Signal" (Twice song), a 2017 song by Twice
- "Signals" (song), a 2021 song by Regard and Kwabs
- "Signal", a song by General Degree
- "Signal", a single by Stan Getz
- "Signal", a song from the 2006 Bollywood film Bhagam Bhag
- "Signal", a song by Sara Groves from the album Floodplain

== Places ==
=== United States ===
- Signal, Arizona, a ghost town
- Signal, Missouri, a ghost town
- Signal, Ohio, an unincorporated community

== Organizations ==
- Signal Foundation, a non-profit organization
- Signal Entertainment Group, a South Korean company

== Other uses ==
- Signal (bridge), a permitted means of conveying information to partner through the play of cards in contract bridge
- Citation signal, in law
- Signal (toothpaste)
- USS Signal, several US Navy ships
- Signals (Finnish Defence Forces), a service branch

== See also ==
- Cignal, a satellite pay TV provider in the Philippines
- Cignal TV, Philippine media and telecommunications company
- Cygnal, an audio and video server
- Digital signal (disambiguation)
- Signaal, former name of the Dutch defense company Thales Nederland
- Signal Awards, awards for podcasts
- Signal 1, a radio station
- Signal 2, a radio station
- The Signal (disambiguation)
- Singal, a surname
- Signal Mountain (disambiguation)
- Virtue signalling, the conspicuous expression of moral values
