= Ingri and Edgar Parin d'Aulaire =

Wife-and-husband illustrator and children's writer duo

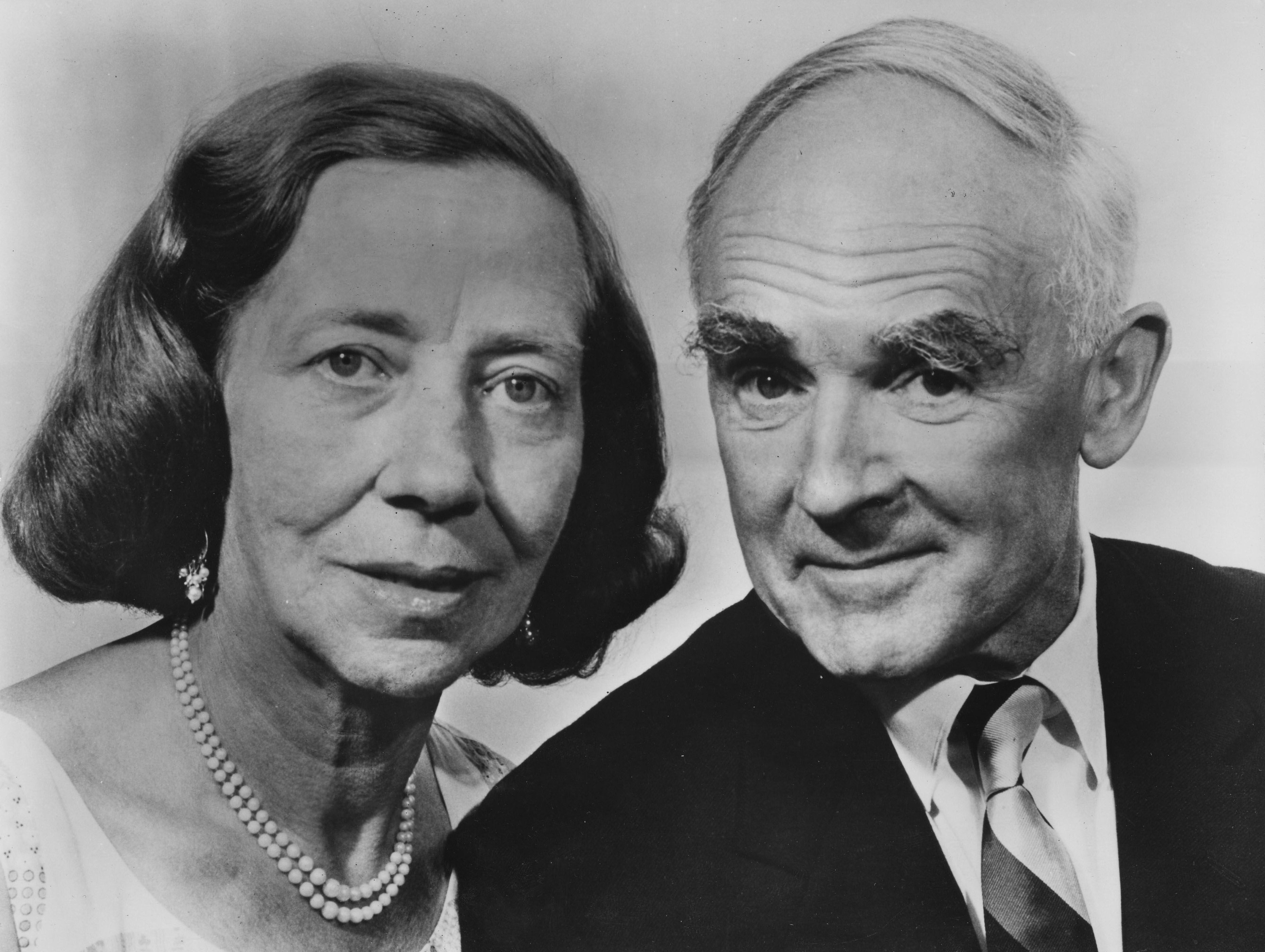
Ingri and Edgar Parin d'Aulaire (circa 1961)

Ingri d'Aulaire (December 27, 1904 – October 24, 1980) and Edgar Parin d'Aulaire (September 30, 1898 – May 1, 1986) were writers and illustrators of children's books who worked primarily as a team, completing almost all of their well-known works together. The couple immigrated to the United States from Europe and worked on books that focused on history such as Abraham Lincoln, which won the 1940 Caldecott Medal. They were part of the group of immigrant artists composed of Feodor Rojankovsky, Roger Duvoisin, Ludwig Bemelmans, Miska Petersham and Tibor Gergely, who helped shape the Golden Age of picture books in mid-twentieth-century America.

== Background ==
Edgar Parin, originally of Swiss citizenship, was born in Munich, Germany to an Italian portrait painter Gino Parin and Ella Auler, a talented artist and musician who had moved from St. Louis to Paris. His parents separated when Parin was six years old and he grew up spending time with each, travelling around Europe with his father. Edgar Parin took his mother's maiden name when she changed it from Auler to d'Aulaire. After studying architecture for a year in Munich, he began art studies at its School of Arts and Crafts (German:Kunstgewerbeschule). Edgar, a pupil of Hans Hofmann and Henri Matisse, studied fresco in Florence, painted murals in France and Norway, and exhibited in Paris, Berlin and Oslo. He illustrated many books in Germany from 1922 to 1926 and painted frescoes in Norway from 1926 to 1927.

Ingri Mortenson was born in Kongsberg, Norway into an artistic family. Her uncle, for instance, was a clergyman and poet who translated the Icelandic Eddas into Norwegian and set his own poetry to music by Edvard Grieg. When she was 15, the Norwegian painter Harriet Backer encouraged her to pursue art as a career, and Ingri later studied at art schools in Norway, Germany and France.

Ingri and Edgar met in Munich when Ingri was an art student. They were married in 1925. A modest insurance settlement following a near-fatal bus–trolley collision in Paris provided the seed money for Edgar's steerage-class voyage to the U.S. to scout for opportunities. He garnered enough commissions illustrating books to send for Ingri and they moved into a cold-water walk-up flat in Brooklyn in 1929.

At first they pursued separate careers. Edgar concentrated on illustrating books using wood block engravings and stone lithography; Ingri garnered commissions to paint portraits of prominent businessmen.

Their work caught the eye of the director of the New York Public Library. Acting on her suggestion, the d'Aulaires decided to turn their talents to children's books and collaborated to create The Magic Rug in 1931. Shortly thereafter they became U.S. citizens. They lived and worked in Wilton, Connecticut, from 1941 until their deaths in the 1980s. They also had a farm in Royalton, Vermont.

== Literary works ==
Many of the d'Aulaires' early books depict the scenery and folktales of Norway: Ola, Children of the Northlights, East of the Sun and West of the Moon. Later their attention shifted to their adopted country and they produced books about American heroes such as Pocahontas, Benjamin Franklin, and Buffalo Bill.

Using their research and travel experiences as inspiration, the husband-and-wife team produced 27 illustrated books for children including many picture books. Edgar illustrated Children of the Soil: A Story of Scandinavia by Nora Burglon, who was a 1932 Newbery Medal runner-up for that work.

The d'Aulaires won the third annual Caldecott Medal in 1940 for Abraham Lincoln, a picture-book life of the 16th U.S. President. They won the 1953 Boy's Club award for their version of Buffalo Bill (1952).

Ingri and Edgar Parin d'Aulaires' Book of Greek Myths, published by Doubleday in 1962, was an elaborately illustrated compendium of Greek mythology, 192 pages in 46 chapters.

In 1967, they published Norse Gods and Giants, based on the Prose Edda and Poetic Edda. The 154-page book presents 30 Norse myths and includes most of the basic stories of the Norse pantheon.

D'Aulaires' Trolls was one of The New York Times Book Review outstanding books of 1972. It was also a National Book Award finalist. They completed a sequel in 1976, The Terrible Troll Bird, an adaptation of one of their earlier works, Ola and Blakken.

=== Reprints ===
In 2005, New York Review Books reissued Norse Gods and Giants under the name d'Aulaires' Book of Norse Myths. This volume was carefully printed to reproduce the vibrant color and texture of the original lithographs, and includes a glowing foreword by Michael Chabon. Its immediate popularity prompted NYRB to reissue d'Aulaire's Trolls in 2006, which likewise was a meticulous reprint of the 1972 original pressing. That was followed by a reprint of The Terrible Troll Bird.

Animals Everywhere was reprinted and retitled d'Aulaires' Book of Animals in late April 2007, followed by a new edition of The Two Cars, then by Too Big and Foxie, a retelling of Anton Chekhov's short story "Kashtanka".

In 2016, University of Minnesota Press reissued East of the Sun and West of the Moon under the title d'Aulaires' Book of Norwegian Folktales.

=== Translations ===
In 2007 and 2008, respectively, the Italian publisher Donzelli Editori reissued smaller-format Italian language editions of Norse Myths, retitled Miti Del Nord, and Trolls, retitled Il Libro Dei Troll. Several of the d'Aulaires' books are also available in Korean and Japanese language editions.

== Awards ==
The d'Aulaires received the Catholic Library Association Regina Medal for "continued distinguished contribution to children's literature" in 1970. They were the 1974 U.S. nominee for the biennial, international Hans Christian Andersen Award for children's illustrators.

The d'Aulaires and Abraham Lincoln won the Caldecott Medal from the American Library Association in 1940, recognizing the previous year's "most distinguished American picture book for children". Buffalo Bill (1952) won the 1953 Boy's Club award. D'Aulaires' Trolls (1972) was a finalist for the annual National Book Award, Children's Literature and a New York Times Book Review "outstanding book" for 1972.

== Works ==
- The Magic Rug, Doubleday, 1931
- Ola, Doubleday, 1932 * %%
- Ola and Blakken, Doubleday, 1933
- The Conquest of the Atlantic, Viking Press, 1933
- The Lord's Prayer, Doubleday, 1934
- Children of the Northlights, Viking Press, 1935 * %
- George Washington, Beautiful Feet Books, 1936 * ∗
- East of the Sun and West of the Moon, Viking Press, 1938 * %%%
- Abraham Lincoln, Doubleday, Doran, 1939 * ∗
- Animals Everywhere, Doubleday, 1940 | * ∗
- Leif the Lucky, Doubleday, Doran, 1941 * ∗
- The Star Spangled Banner, Doubleday, Doran, 1942
- Don’t Count Your Chicks, Doubleday, 1943
- Wings for Per, Doubleday, 1944
- Too Big, Doubleday, 1945 *
- Pocahontas, Doubleday, 1946 * ∗
- Nils, Doubleday, 1948
- Foxie, Doubleday, 1949 *
- Benjamin Franklin, Doubleday, 1950 * ∗
- Buffalo Bill, Doubleday, 1952 * ∗
- The Two Cars, Doubleday, 1955 *
- Columbus, Doubleday, 1955 * ∗
- The Magic Meadow, Doubleday, 1958
- d'Aulaire's Book of Greek Myths, Doubleday, 1962 * ∗ (Also available as an unabridged audio CD narrated by Paul Newman, Sidney Poitier, Kathleen Turner, and Matthew Broderick.)∗
- Norse Gods and Giants, Doubleday, 1967 * † ∗
- Trolls, Doubleday, 1972 * # ∗
- The Terrible Troll Bird, Doubleday, 1976 * ‡

* Currently in print
| Reissued as d'Aulaire's Book of Animals, New York Review Books, 2007
# Reissued as d'Aulaires' Trolls, New York Review Books, 2006
† Reissued as d'Aulaires' Book of Norse Myths, New York Review Books, 2005
‡ Based on the earlier Ola and Blakken
% Reissued by the University of Minnesota Press, 2012
%% Reissued by the University of Minnesota Press, 2013
%%% Reissued as d'Aulaires Book of Norwegian Folktales, University of Minnesota Press, 2016
