= The New York Review Children's Collection =

Publication series of children's books

The New York Review Books Children's Collection (currently published under the label NYRB Kids) is a series of children's books released under the publishing imprint New York Review Books. The series was founded in 2003 to reintroduce some of the many children's books that have fallen out of print, or simply out of mainstream attention. The series includes more than 80 titles, ranging from picture books to young adult novels. Often reissued with new introductions, writers such as Michael Chabon, Neil Gaiman, and Philip Pullman have all introduced titles in this series.

The titles include the Caldecott Medal–winning picture book D'Aulaires' Book of Norse Myths; the Newbery Honor Book Pecos Bill; Wee Gillis, a Caldecott Honor Book; the 1944 winner of the Carnegie Medal, The Wind on the Moon; Esther Averill's Jenny and the Cat Club series; The House of Arden; The 13 Clocks; The Wonderful O; The Peterkin Papers; and holiday favorites The Midnight Folk and The Box of Delights.

== Titles in the series ==
- Alfred Ollivant's Bob, Son of Battle by Alfred Ollivant
- Alphabetabum by Vladimir Radunsky and Chris Raschka
- An Episode of Sparrows by Rumer Godden
- Arthur by Rhoda Levine
- Beyond the PawPaw Trees by Palmer Brown
- Bel Ria: Dog of War by Sheila Burnford
- Captains of the City Streets by Esther Averill
- Carbonel: The King of Cats by Barbara Sleigh
- Carbonel & Calidor by Barbara Sleigh
- Catlantis by Anna Starobinets
- Charlotte Sometimes by Penelope Farmer
- Cheerful by Palmer Brown
- D'Aulaires' Book of Animals by Ingri and Edgar Parin d'Aulaire
- D'Aulaires' Book of Norse Myths by Ingri and Edgar Parin d'Aulaire
- D'Aulaires' Book of Trolls by Ingri and Edgar Parin d'Aulaire
- Donkey-Donkey by Roger Duvoisin
- Fletcher and Zenobia by Victoria Chess and Edward Gorey
- Foxie: The Singing Dog by Ingri and Edgar Parin d'Aulaire
- Harrison Loved His Umbrella by Rhoda Levine
- Jenny and the Cat Club by Esther Averill
- Jenny Goes to Sea by Esther Averill
- Jenny's Birthday Book by Esther Averill
- Jenny's Moonlight Adventure by Esther Averill
- Krabat and the Sorcerer’s Mill by Otfried Preußler
- Mistress Masham's Repose by T.H. White
- Mouse House by Rumer Godden
- Pecos Bill by James Cloyd Bowman
- The 13 Clocks by James Thurber
- The Bear and the People by Reiner Zimnik
- The Bears' Famous Invasion of Sicily by Dino Buzzati
- The Box of Delights by John Masefield
- The Complete Polly and the Wolf by Catherine Storr
- The Crane by Reiner Zimnik
- The Hotel Cat by Esther Averill
- The Island of Horses by Eilís Dillon
- The House of Arden by E. Nesbit
- The Little Bookroom by Eleanor Farjeon
- The Lost Island by Eilís Dillon
- The Magic Pudding by Norman Lindsay
- The Marzipan Pig by Russell Hoban
- The Midnight Folk by John Masefield
- The Peterkin Papers by Lucretia P. Hale
- The School for Cats by Esther Averill
- The Two Cars by Ingri and Edgar Parin d'Aulaire
- The Wind on the Moon by Eric Linklater
- The Wonderful O by James Thurber
- Three Ladies Beside the Sea by Rhoda Levine
- Too Big by Ingri and Edgar Parin d'Aulaire
- Uncle by J. P. Martin
- Uncle Cleans Up by J. P. Martin
- Wee Gillis by Munro Leaf
- Wolf Story by William McCleery
