= Golden Book Encyclopedia =

Set of children's encyclopedias

The Golden Book Encyclopedia is a set of children's encyclopedias published by Western Printing and Lithographing Company under the name Golden Press. Advertised with circulars in newspapers, the encyclopedias were sent out in weekly or bi-weekly installments. Supermarket chains, such as Acme Markets, used these encyclopedias as a promotional hook to lure shoppers.

The front page of every volume describes the books as, "Fact-filled Volumes Dramatically Illustrated with More Than 6,000 Pictures. The Only Encyclopedia for Young Grade-school children. Accurate and Authoritative. Entertainingly written and illustrated to make learning an adventure." Subjects covered in the series included nature, science, history, geography, literature, and the arts.

== Editions ==
An earlier single-volume encyclopedia entitled The Golden Encyclopedia was published in a joint venture between Simon & Schuster and Western Printing and Lithographing Company in 1946. The author of that edition was Dorothy A. Bennett and the illustrator was Cornelius De Witt. The Golden Book Encyclopedia, a 16-volume hardcover edition, was published from 1959 to 1969; these sets were written by Bertha Morris Parker, formerly of the Laboratory Schools at the University of Chicago and research associate at the Chicago Natural History Museum. The 1988 edition lists the author as "Golden Press," and contains 4 extra volumes, making it a 20-volume set.

== Volumes ==
1959 Edition

- Volume 1 - Aardvark to Army
- Volume 2 - Arthur to Blood
- Volume 3 - Boats to Cereal
- Volume 4 - Chalk to Czechoslovakia
- Volume 5 - Daguerreotype to Epiphyte
- Volume 6 - Erosion to Geysers
- Volume 7 - Ghosts to Houseplants
- Volume 8 - Hudson to Korea
- Volume 9 - Labor Day to Matches
- Volume 10 - Mathematics to Natural Gas
- Volume 11 - Navy to Parasites
- Volume 12 - Paricutin to Quicksand
- Volume 13 - Rabbits to Signaling
- Volume 14 - Silk to Textiles
- Volume 15 - Thailand to Volcanoes
- Volume 16 - Wales to Zoos

== Other versions ==
Besides publishing an encyclopedia for children, Golden Press has also published similar reference material, which includes The Golden Book Encyclopedia of Natural Science and The Golden Home and High School Encyclopedia.

== Sales ==
60 million copies of individual Encyclopedia volumes were sold between 1959 and 1961.

== Translations ==
In French: edited in 1960 by "éditions des deux coqs d'or" under the name: "Encyclopédie du livre d'or pour garçons et filles" in 16 volumes
