= Doctor Dan the Bandage Man =

Children's book

- First edition cover
- Author: Helen Gaspard
- Audio read by: Ann Gladys Lloyd, Dick Byron
- Illustrator: Corinne Malvern
- Language: English
- Series: Little Golden Books
- Release number: 111
- Subject: adhesive bandages
- Genre: children's literature
- Publisher: Simon & Schuster, Penguin Random House
- Publication date: 1950
- Media type: hardback
- Pages: 24
- ISBN: 0-375-82880-X
- OCLC: 1019733909
- LC Class: PZ7.G214

Doctor Dan the Bandage Man is a children's book first published in 1950, which promotes adhesive bandages. It was originally sold with six Band-Aid brand bandages inside (later editions contained two). The book was conceived by publisher Simon & Schuster, and published as part of their Little Golden Books series, with the cooperation of Band-Aid manufacturer Johnson & Johnson. It was written by Helen Gaspard, with illustrations by Corinne Malvern.

== Plot ==
The book follows a child named Dan who, while playing, gets a scratch on his finger, to which his mother applies a Band-Aid. Dan then provides Band-Aids to his injured sister, her doll, their dog, and his father, leading the latter to nickname him "Doctor Dan".

== Popularity ==
Following an initial print run of 1.75 million copies (the largest first printing in the Little Golden Books series to that date), Doctor Dan quickly became and remains one of the series' most popular titles, and remains in print as of 2018 under the Little Golden Books series' current publisher, Penguin Random House. The book is in the collection of the National Museum of American History.

== Related media ==
An audio edition of the book was also published by Golden Records and distributed by Simon & Schuster in 1950. The publisher released a similar book containing Band-Aids aimed at girls, Nurse Nancy, in 1952. A sequel, Doctor Dan at the Circus, written by Pauline Wilkins and illustrated by Katherine Sampson, was published in 1960 by Golden Press.

== Translations ==
A Dutch translation by novelist Nicolaas Matsier was published in 2011.

== See also ==
- Product placement
