= Varga Studio =

Defunct Hungarian animation studio

Coordinates: 47°32′46″N 19°02′43″E

Varga Studio, Ltd. was an animation studio located in Budapest, Hungary. It operated from 1988 to 2005 and was one of Europe's nine leading animation houses. While most of its work was for European animation, it occasionally animated for American series as well. Varga has animated the following series and films:

- Amazing Animals (2D segments only)
- The Animal Train (co-produced with TVC London)
- Animaniacs (When You're Traveling skit only)
- Angelina Ballerina
- As Told by Ginger (pilot only)
- Baby Blues
- Kipper
- Percy the Park Keeper
- Poky and Friends (co-produced with TVC London, Little Golden Books and Golden Books Family Entertainment. Distributed by Sony Wonder)
- Preston Pig (co-produced with Link Entertainment (later acquired by Entertainment Rights))
- Mr. Bean: The Animated Series (2002–2004)
- Sheeep
- The Thief and the Cobbler (additional ink and paint)

In addition, Varga worked on many early advertisements for Butterfinger featuring The Simpsons, as well as music videos of The Simpsons such as "Do the Bartman" and "Deep, Deep Trouble". They were subcontracted for these specials so that the regular Simpsons studios like AKOM, Rough Draft Studios, and Anivision were not burdened with extra work and could concentrate on animating full episodes.

From 2000, the studio produced cartoons as a subcontractor to Varga Holdings, which was established at the time, and to its owner, Varga Holdings Ltd., which was registered in the United Kingdom. The 2002 Mr. Bean cartoon series reached nearly four million views at its premiere on ITV1 in the UK. The production cost was more than six million dollars.

Varga Studios Budapest worked on the pilot of the Animated Credits, (1999) and Varga Holdings later in 2002–2004.

In 2005, Varga Studio shut down due to financial problems
