= Earnest C. Watson =

American physicist (1892–1970)

Earnest Charles Watson, Jr. (June 18, 1892 – December 5, 1970) was an American physicist. He helped establish the physics department at the California Institute of Technology, where he worked for 40 years. He was the head of faculty for his last 14 years until he left in 1959 to become the science attaché to the United States Embassy in India. He oversaw the development of a large number of rockets for WWII. He was married to Jane Werner Watson, author of the Little Golden Books series for young children.

== Early life and education ==
Earnest C. Watson was born on June 18, 1892 in Sullivan, Illinois, where his father was a Presbyterian minister. He moved with his family to San Francisco in 1906 and attended Lafayette College in Easton, Pennsylvania, graduating in 1914. He did his graduate studies in physics at the University of Chicago, leaving for service in World War I to do anti-submarine research.

== Academic career ==
Watson returned to the University of Chicago after the war as an assistant professor. He was sent to Pasadena, California by physicist Robert A. Millikan to oversee the construction of the first physics laboratory on the Caltech campus, then called the Throop Polytechnic Institute. When Millikan joined Caltech in 1917, Watson followed him. Millikan was the first president, and he won Nobel for measuring the charge of an electron in 1923. Watson worked closely with Millikan, Arthur Noyes and George Ellery Hale to build the school's physics department into a premier research institutions. His preferred research subject was x-ray photoelectrons.

=== Watson lecture series ===
In 1922, Watson was approached by a group of local high school science teachers who were struggling to understand the latest developments in physics. Watson began giving weekly physics lectures for the public. The lectures would repeat the weekly laboratory demonstrations he gave to his first and second-year physics students, offering digestible explanations of theory without the complex mathematics underpinnings. Watson inaugurated the lecture series in 1922 with his signature demonstration of super-cooled liquid air. His Friday evening demonstration lectures featured eminent scientists from all fields and attracted large crowds. Two years after Watson's death in 1970, the Caltech Lecture Series was eponymously renamed in his honor.

=== University administration ===
From 1945 until his retirement in 1959, Earnest Watson was dean of the Caltech faculty, and he served as acting chairman of Caltech's division of physics, mathematics and astronomy from 1946 to 1946. During World War II, he was a member of the National Defense Research Committee established by President Franklin Delano Roosevelt in 1940, and he directed research on artillery rockets, torpedoes and other ordnance. The project that developed the majority of military artillery rockets for the United States Navy.

In 1960, Watson was appointed science attaché to the U.S. Embassy in New Delhi. He and his wife, Elsa Jane Werner (whom he married in 1954), amassed a large collection of Indian art during his term of service. The collection of about 300 paintings covering four centuries was called "one of this country's most important collections of Indian miniature paintings". Owing to his experiences in India and background in science and education, he became a consultant to the Ford Foundation on educational projects in India and Pakistan. He was active in that work to the end of his life.

== Personal life ==
In 1954 at the age of 62, Watson married Elsa Jane Werner, author of more than 175 books, including about a third of the Little Golden Books line. He inspired her to write a book for children called "The World of Science" in 1956 and it was published with an introduction by Watson in 1958. The couple met in Greece and traveled frequently throughout their relationship, including a six month tour through the Middle East in 1956 and a South America trip in 1958.

Watson died at his home in Santa Barbara, California on December 5, 1970. Upon Watson's death, Elsa Werner donated the couple's collection of Indian art to the University of Wisconsin-Madison, where it was put on display in 1971.
