= The World of Science =

Science book for youth (1958)

- Author: Jane Werner Watson
- Illustrator: Photographs by Wilson & MacPherson Hole et al, Charts and Drawings by Fred Kopp Studios
- Cover artist: William Dugan
- Language: English
- Series: Golden Books
- Subject: Science
- Genre: Textbook
- Publisher: Western Publishing
- Publication date: 1958
- Publication place: United States
- Pages: 216

The World of Science was a youth-oriented science book first published in 1958 under the Golden Books imprint. The principal author was Jane Werner Watson, but the science material was contributed by contemporary scientists, many of whom worked at the California Institute of Technology, including the author's husband Earnest C. Watson (1892-1970), who was Dean of the Faculty from 1945 to 1959.

Rather than being an introduction to science in the usual sense, The World of Science concentrated on describing the activities of scientists at the time of publication. Topics included geology and other Earth sciences, biology including plant genetics and embryonic development, physics including high energy particle physics and theoretical physics, chemistry with electron and X-ray diffraction analysis, modern mathematics including set theory, astronomy (both visual and radio), and aerodynamics including supersonic wind tunnels and Schlieren photography.

The book was illustrated in color, presenting charts, images from scientific instruments and photographs of scientists and engineers at work in the field and inside laboratories. Some of the pictures were unusual for a publication of the time, including pictures of an African-American researcher at work in a chemistry laboratory. One notable topic, covered in the section on theoretical physics, was the recently discovered phenomenon of parity violation in beta decay, a subject almost unknown outside the world of physics. One photograph, of two unnamed theoretical physicists in front of a blackboard, actually depicts Richard Feynman talking to Murray Gell-Mann. In 1958 both were relatively unknown. Feynman won the Nobel Prize in 1965 while Gell-Mann won in 1969.

The book is cited by some as their inspiration for a scientific career.

== Summary of contents ==
- Geology : Glaciers, Seismology, Dating rocks, Finding and analyzing fossils.
- Astronomy : Modern telescopes, Study of Galaxies, History of Astronomy, Spectroscopy and Red Shift, Radio Astronomy.
- Mathematics : Calculations, Set theory, Computers, Statistics and Probability.
- Physics : Cosmic Rays, "Atom Smashers", Cryophysics (incl. Helium II), Theoretical Physics.
- Chemistry : Atmospheric reactions and smog, Organic Chemistry (incl. sugars), Physical Chemistry (incl. crystallography), "Giant Molecules" (proteins).
- Biology : Plant Ecology, Genetics and Virology, Immunology, the Human Brain.
- Engineering : Hydraulic & Civil Engineering, Aerodynamics (incl. supersonic flight), Communications and Automation.

== Notable Contributors ==
- Geology: Clair Cameron Patterson, Frank Press.
- Physics: Carl David Anderson, Robert Bacher, Felix Boehm, Richard Feynman, Murray Gell-Mann, Robert Walker.
- Chemistry: Linus Pauling
- Biology: George Wells Beadle, Roger Wolcott Sperry
- Engineering: Hans W. Liepmann
