= Gustaf Tenggren =

Swedish illustrator (1896–1970)

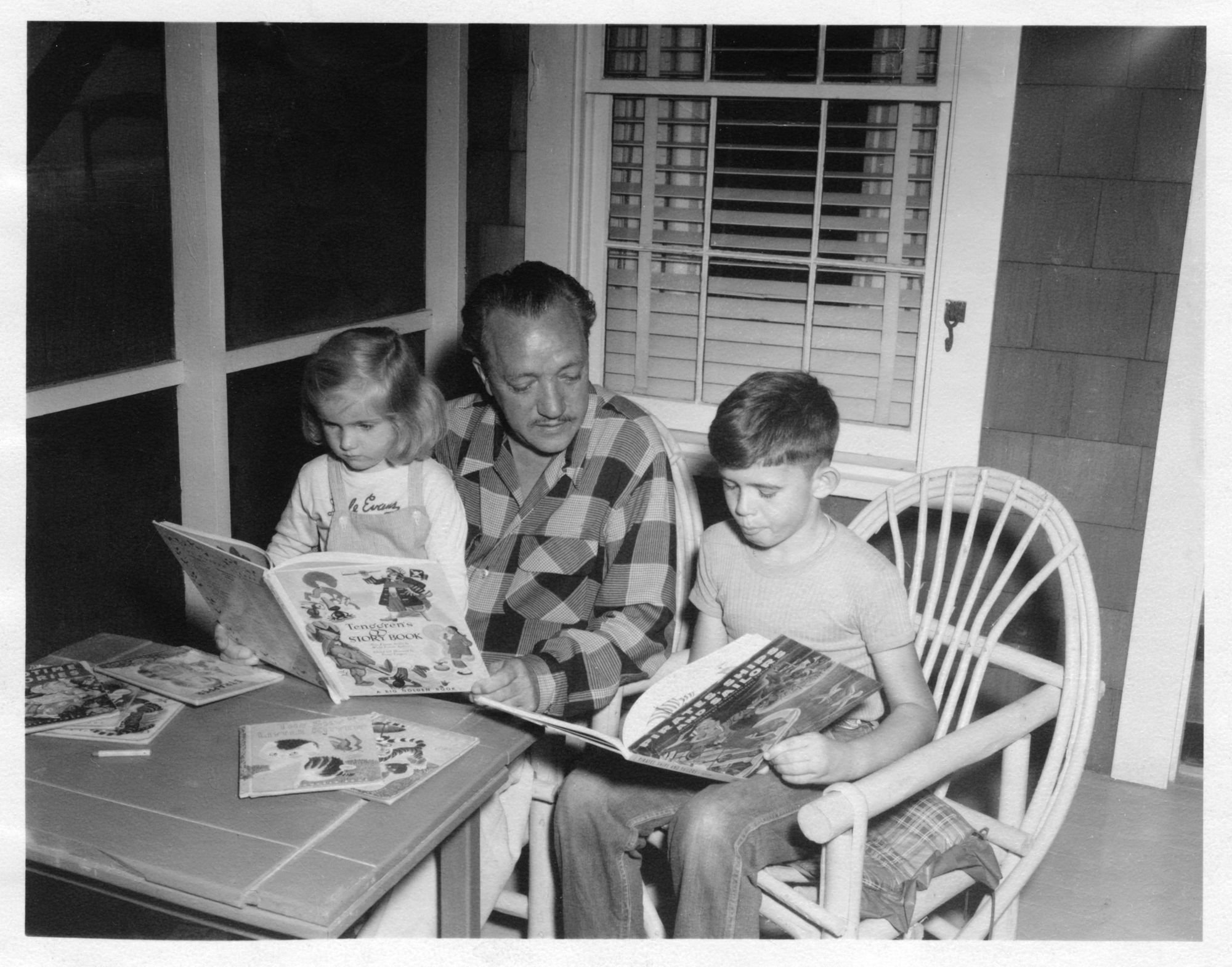
- Gustaf Tenggren with children 1950
- Born: Gustaf Adolf Tenggren; November 3, 1896; Alingsås, Sweden
- Died: April 9, 1970 (aged 73); Maine, United States
- Burial place: Spruce Lawn Cemetery, Lincoln County, Maine, US
- Occupations: Illustrator, animator
- Years active: 1927–1970

Gustaf Adolf Tenggren (November 3, 1896 – April 9, 1970) was a Swedish illustrator and animator. He is known for his Arthur Rackham-influenced fairy-tale style and use of silhouetted figures with caricatured faces. Tenggren was a chief illustrator for The Walt Disney Company in the late 1930s, in what has been called the Golden Age of American animation, when animated feature films such as Snow White and the Seven Dwarfs, Fantasia, Bambi and Pinocchio were produced.

== Early career ==
Gustaf Tenggren was born in 1896 in Magra parish (now part of Alingsås Municipality), in Västra Götaland County, Sweden. In 1913 he received a scholarship to study painting at Valand, the art school in Gothenburg, Sweden. Tenggren's early schooling and artistic influences were solidly grounded in Scandinavian techniques, motifs and myths; he worked with illustrating in the popular Swedish folklore and fairy tales annual Bland Tomtar och Troll ("Among Gnomes and Trolls"), where he succeeded illustrator John Bauer.

After his first exhibition in 1920, Tenggren immigrated to the U.S. where he joined his sister in Cleveland, Ohio. Moving to New York City in 1922, he made a name for himself in magazine illustration and advertising, while continuing to illustrate children's books.

== Disney Company ==
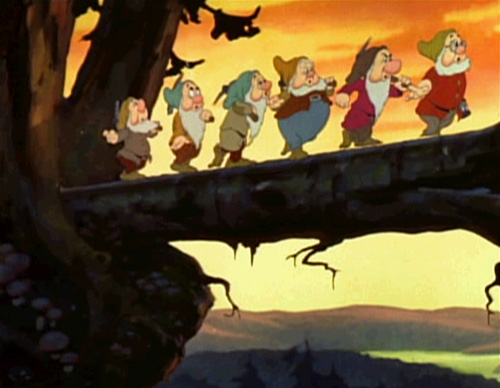
In Snow White and the Seven Dwarfs (1937), Tenggren's presentation drawing depicts the major characteristics of each of the seven dwarves.

In the 1920s, while continuing to illustrate a large number of children's books, Tenggren worked consistently in advertising up until the Great Depression; in 1936, he was hired by Walt Disney Productions, to work as a chief illustrator with Snow White and the Seven Dwarfs. Tenggren was not only a concept artist on this movie, but he did much of the illustrations for the non-animated tie-ins to the film, most notably the serialized version of Snow White which was featured in two successive issues of Good Housekeeping just prior to the film's release. He later worked with productions such as Bambi and Pinocchio, as well as backgrounds and atmospheres of films such as The Ugly Duckling and The Old Mill. In January 1939, during the early stages of Bambi, he left the studio and returned to New York, where he had lived before being hired by Disney.

== Children's books ==
The Poky Little Puppy (1942). Tenggren gave up his Rackham-esque fairy tale illustration style after he left Disney in 1940.

Although his work for the studio was still that way, Tenggren never painted in the Rackham fairy-tale illustration style again after he left Disney. From 1942 to 1962, Tenggren worked for Little Golden Books with illustrations for children's books such as Saggy Baggy Elephant, Tawny Scrawny Lion, The Shy Little Kitten, Little Black Sambo, and The Poky Little Puppy, which became the single all-time best-selling hardcover children's book in English; and "King Arthur and the Knights of the Round Table," Emma Gelders Sterne's retelling of the Arthurian Legend. During these years his production increased, as did the marketability of his name with a stream of Tenggren books.

After he moved to the United States in 1920, he never returned to Sweden again. Gustaf Tenggren died in 1970 at Dogfish Head in Southport, Maine.

== Legacy ==
Although the name Gustaf Tenggren remains relatively unknown, his work is widely recognized, both that in the Disney films and his work in the Little Golden Books. After his death, much of his non-Disney art was donated to the University of Minnesota to be included in the Kerlan Collection, a special library focusing on children's literature.

In memory of Gustaf Tenggren, a 9-meter (30 ft) bronze sculpture of Pinocchio, designed by the American pop artist Jim Dine, has been erected in downtown Borås, a city south of Tenggren's birthplace. At the cost of SEK 9.5 million, the Pinocchio sculpture was supposed to be paid for by private donations. The statue was erected on a tiered pedestal at the beginning of Allégatan, a main street in the center of Borås at the start of the Borås Festival of the Arts on May 16, 2008.

Gustaf Tenggren's atmospheric painting of Snow White listening as the Prince sings One Song was sold for $85,400 at Heritage Auctions' Disney Sales (totaled $3.4m).

== Filmography ==
=== Illustrations ===
- Snow White and the Seven Dwarfs (1937)
- Pinocchio (1940)
- Fantasia (Night on Bald Mountain/Ave Maria segment)(1940)
- Bambi (1942)

=== Background illustrations ===
- Little Hiawatha (1937)
- The Old Mill (1937)
- The Ugly Duckling (1939)

== Illustrated works ==
1923

- D'Aulnoy's fairy tales

1925

- A Dog of Flanders

1926

- Juan and Juanita, Frances Courtenay Baylor

1927

- Small Fry and the Winged Horse, Ruth Campbell

1928

- Dickey Byrd, Elizabeth Woodruff

1932

- The Ring of the Nibelung, Gertrude Henderson

1938

- Stories from a Magic World, Elizabeth Woodruff

1942

- Runaway Home, Elizabeth Coatsworth
- Bedtime Stories, Gustaf Tenggren
- The Poky Little Puppy, Janette Sebring Lowrey
- The Tenggren Tell-it-Again Book, Katharine Gibson

1943

- The Lively Little Rabbit, George Duplaix
- The Story of England, Beatrice Curtis Brown
- Stories from the Great Metropolitan Opera, Helen Dike
- Sing for Christmas, Opal Wheeler

1944

- Little Match Girl, Hans Christian Andersen
- Sing For America, Opal Wheeler
- Tenggren's Story Book, Gustaf Tenggren

1946

- Farm Stories, Kathryn and Byron Jackson
- The Shy Little Kitten, Cathleen Schurr

1947

- The Big Brown Bear, George Duplaix
- The Saggy Baggy Elephant, Kathryn and Byron Jackson

1948

- Little Black Sambo, Helen Bannerman
- Cowboys and Indians, Kathryn and Byron Jackson

1950

- The Little Trapper, Kathryn & Byron Jackson
- Pirates, Ships and Sailors, Kathryn and Byron Jackson

1951

- The Night Before Christmas, Clement C. Moore

1952

- The Tawny Scrawny Lion, Kathryn and Byron Jackson

1953

- Thumbelina, Hans Christian Andersen
- Topsy Turvy Circus, George Duplaix
- Jack and the Beanstalk, English Folk Tale

1954

- The Golden Goose, Jacob and Wilhelm Grimm

1955

- The Giant with the Three Golden Hairs, Jacob and Wilhelm Grimm
- Snow White and Rose Red, Jacob and Wilhelm Grimm

1957

- Golden Tales from Arabian Nights, Margaret Seifer and Irving Shapiro

1959

- The Lion´s Paw: A Tale of African Animals, Jane Werner Watson

1961

- The Canterbury Tales, A. Kent Hieatt and Constance Hieatt

1962

- King Arther and the Knights of the Round Table, Emma Gelders Sterne and Barbara Lindsay
