= Gertrude Crampton =

American writer

- Born: June 26, 1909; Brooklyn, New York, US
- Died: June 25, 1996 (aged 86); Green Valley, Arizona, US
- Education: University of Michigan (1928), Ann Arbor
- Writing career
- Genre: Children's literature
- Notable works: Tootle, Scuffy the Tugboat

Gertrude Crampton (June 26, 1909 – June 25, 1996) was an author of children's books, including Tootle (1945) and Scuffy the Tugboat (1946).

== Biography ==
Gertrude Crampton was born on June 26, 1909, in Brooklyn, New York, to Faust Crampton and Ruby O'Mally Crampton. She received her teaching credentials from the University of Michigan, Ann Arbor in 1928 and taught in the Mason Consolidated Schools in Erie, Michigan in the 1950s and 1960s.

Her books Tootle and Scuffy were published in the popular Little Golden Books series of Simon & Schuster. As of 2001, Tootle was the all-time third best-selling hardback children's book in English; Scuffy was eighth. She also wrote The Large and Growly Bear, published in the Golden Beginning Reader series in 1961, and illustrated by John P. Miller.
