= NYRB =

NYRB can refer to:

- New York Red Bulls, a soccer team
- New York Review Books, publishing house of The New York Review of Books
- The New York Review of Books, a literary magazine
