= Mary Katharine Reely =

American playwright (1881–1959)

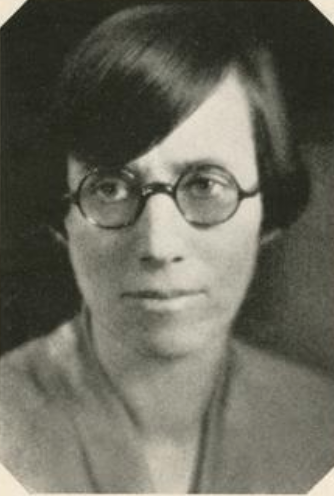
- Reely, from the 1930 yearbook of the University of Wisconsin
- Born: September 20, 1881; Spring Green, Wisconsin, U.S.
- Died: June 10, 1959 (aged 77); Minneapolis, Minnesota, U.S.
- Other name: Kate Reely
- Occupations: Playwright, writer, clubwoman

Mary Katharine Reely (September 20, 1881 – June 10, 1959) was an American playwright, writer, editor, and pacifist. She taught at the University of Wisconsin–Madison from 1921 to 1947.

== Early life and education ==
Reely was born in Spring Green, Wisconsin, the daughter of George G. Reely and Artie Bibb Reely. She graduated from the University of Minnesota in 1912.

== Career ==
Reely taught school as a young woman, and worked at the Unity Settlement House in Minneapolis from 1906 to 1908. She was an editor of Book Review Digest, and wrote debaters' handbooks, compiling source documents, research, and analysis on various controversial issues for use in community groups and classrooms. She published her first play, Anyman: A Modern Morality Play in One Act, in 1913, with at least a dozen more to follow.

Reely returned to Wisconsin after World War I, and taught in the library school at the University of Wisconsin–Madison, where she also edited the Wisconsin Library Bulletin. She spoke to radio audiences and community groups about libraries, books and reading. She resigned from the Wisconsin Free Library Commission in 1947.

Reely was secretary of the Madison branch of the Women's International League for Peace and Freedom (WILPF) from 1925 to 1933. She attended the WILPF meeting in Dublin in 1926. She was a member of the American Association of University Women and the National League of American Pen Women.

Reely died in 1959, at the age of 77, in Minneapolis.

== Publications ==
=== Current affairs guides ===
- Selected articles on world peace (1914)
- Selected articles on immigration (1915)
- Selected articles on minimum wage (1917)
- Country life and rural problems: A study outline (1918)
- Selected articles on disarmament (1921)

=== Plays ===
- Anyman (1913)
- The Helpmeet: A Domestic Comedy (1914, The Masses)
- Daily Bread, A Window to the South, and The Lean Years (1919)
- Solidarity: A Rural Drama of Today (1920)
- Early Ohios and Rhode Island Reds (1921)
- The House Can't Build the Barn (1923)
- Uncle Sam brings it to your door (1923)
- They Just Won't Talk! and To Be Dealt with Accordingly (1924)
- Flittermouse (1927)
- Cave Stuff and Trails (1928)
- Bringing Up Nine (1930)

=== Children's literature ===
- Through Golden Windows: Children's Poets and Story-tellers (1934, with her sister, Ada M. Randall)
- The Blue Mittens (1936, children's book)
- "Thumbs Up Farm" (1946)
- Seatmates (1949, children's book illustrated by Eloise Wilkin)

=== Essays and articles ===
- "O. Henry vs. Scott" (1922)
- "Outstanding books for Wisconsin libraries" (1927)
- "Now is the time to read old books" (1931)
- "Book selection, positive and negative; Some reflections on discarding, building, and replacing" (1942)

=== Short fiction ===
- "Doctor Goes North" (1917)
- "Mother's Day" (1917)
- "A Pot of Bulbs" (1930)

=== Poetry ===
- "He is a King" (1915)
- "Lilacs Stay On" (1925)
- "Epitaph" (1927)
