= The Little Red Caboose =

Children's picture book

- First edition, A Little Golden Book (publ. Simon & Schuster)
- Author: Marian Potter
- Illustrator: Tibor Gergely
- Language: English
- Genre: Fiction
- Published: 1953
- Publisher: Little Golden Books
- Pages: 24

The Little Red Caboose is a children's book by Marian Potter and illustrated by Tibor Gergely, first published by Little Golden Book in 1953. Hardcover book contains 24 pages.

== Plot ==
It tells the story of a caboose who longs to be as popular as the steam engine at the front of the train, and gains the respect and admiration of all when it saves the train from rolling down a steep hill.

== In popular culture ==
The book was featured in season 6 premiere of This is Us, in which Rebecca reads the story to her children when they are young, but is unable to remember the title late in life due to her progressing dementia.

== Book sources ==
- ISBN 0-307-02152-1
