= The Shy Little Kitten =

Children's book by Cathleen Schurr, published 1946

- Author: Cathleen Schurr
- Illustrator: Gustaf Tenggren
- Language: English
- Series: Little Golden Books
- Genre: Children's books
- Publisher: Golden Books
- Publication date: 1946
- Publication place: United States

The Shy Little Kitten is a famous Little Golden Book written by Cathleen Schurr and illustrated by Gustaf Tenggren, noted for his illustrations featured in fellow Little Golden Book The Poky Little Puppy. Originally published in 1946, the storybook has earned a reputation as one of the most iconic, classic Little Golden Books ever written and as a popular children's picture book.

== Premise ==
A cat gives birth to a litter of kittens, including a bashful, timid kitten who winds up wandering away from the rest of her family. Along the way, she winds up encountering a mole, whom she accompanies for a stroll through the grass, and the pair stumble upon a friendly toad. The meek kitten also befriends a frisky black puppy, and manages to return to her mother and sisters in time to join them and all of her new friends on a picnic. After a rather comedic incident involving the frog being stung by a bee and all of the attendants dining at the picnic winding up leaping into a nearby pond to safety, the kitten declares that she has experienced "the best day ever."

== Popularity ==
Although it is not as well known as The Poky Little Puppy, The Shy Little Kitten and its main protagonist have achieved recognition and fame as a popular Little Golden Book. The character of the Shy Little Kitten has also been featured in animated television adaptions or direct-to-video children's films.
