= The Signal =

The Signal may refer to:

== Film and television ==
- The Signal (2007 American film), a horror film
- The Signal (2007 Argentine film), a neo-noir mystery
- The Signal (2014 film), an American science fiction thriller
- "The Signal" (The Amazing World of Gumball), a 2016 TV episode
- "The Signal" (Ted Lasso), a 2021 TV episode

== Music ==
- The Signal (Sandra Nasić album), 2007
- The Signal (Urthboy album), 2007
- The Signal (soundtrack), from the 2014 film

== Newspapers ==
- The Santa Clarita Valley Signal, Santa Clarita, California, U.S.
- The Signal (college newspaper), Georgia State University
- The Signal, The College of New Jersey

== Other uses ==
- The Signal (podcast), a Firefly and Serenity podcast
- The Signal (radio program), a 2007–2017 Canadian music program
- Duke Thomas (The Signal), a superhero in DC Comics
- The Signal, a downloadable episode of the 2010 video game Alan Wake

== See also ==
- Signal (disambiguation)
