= Scuffy the Tugboat =

Book by Gertrude Crampton

First edition

Scuffy the Tugboat is a children's book written by Gertrude Crampton and illustrated by Tibor Gergely. The book was first published in 1946 as part of the Little Golden Books series.

== Plot ==
Scuffy is a toy tugboat who wishes for "bigger things" than sailing in the bathtub. The Man with the Polkadot Tie (who owns a toy store) and his son take Scuffy to a small brook in a pasture, and soon the current carries him away. At first Scuffy is pleased. The brook grows into a stream which turns into a small river and finally a larger river. Scuffy is overwhelmed by the sheer size of things around him. As he is just about to sail off into the endless ocean, he is rescued by the man and his boy and returned to the bathtub where Scuffy is now content to remain.

== Notes ==
- Scuffy does not have a series of books like The Poky Little Puppy, The Saggy Baggy Elephant, and Tawny Scrawny Lion.
