= Feodor Stepanovich Rojankovsky =

Russian painter

- Фёдор Степанович Рожанковский
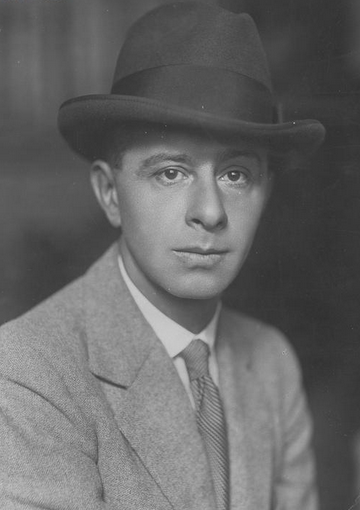
- Rojankovsky, c. 1925
- Born: Mitava, Courland Governorate, Russian Empire; December 24, 1891
- Died: October 12, 1970 (aged 78); Bronxville, New York, US
- Notable work: Frog Went A-Courtin
- Awards: Caldecott Medal (1956)

Feodor Stepanovich Rojankovsky (Russian: Фёдор Степа́нович Рожанкóвский, romanized: Fyodor Stepanovich Rozhankovsky; December 24, 1891 – October 12, 1970), also known as Rojan, was a Russian émigré illustrator. He is well known both for children's book illustration and for erotic art. He won the 1956 Caldecott Medal for U.S. picture book illustration from the American Library Association, recognizing Frog Went A-Courtin' by John Langstaff.

== Biography ==
Rojankovsky was born in Mitava, in Courland Governorate of the Russian Empire (present-day Latvia) on December 24, 1891, to Lydia Kiprianova and Stepan Fedorovich Rojankovsky. After Stephan's death in 1897, the family moved to St. Petersburg to be closer to his older married sister. There, Rojan's interest in books grew, particularly natural history picture books and illustrated classics. He studied two years at the private Moscow School of Painting, Sculpture and Architecture but left in 1914 to serve in the Imperial Russian Army during World War I where he served as Staff Captain of one of the first motorized units until 1917. His first work appeared in the May 1915 issue of the magazine Lukomor’e where he depicted war scenes during his bed rest after being wounded in battle.

After the war, Rojankovsky joined his siblings in Ukraine and worked as an artist for the local district council where some of his projects were illustrating books for local schools. He was conscripted by the White Army in 1919, soon to be a prisoner of war in Poland. After the war, he stayed in Poland working with Polish bookseller and publisher Rudolf Wegner designing book covers and illustrating whole books. After the Rapallo Treaty of 1922 recognized the new Soviet Union, he was unable to return to Russia with his Tsarist papers and became a stateless person and moved to France in 1925 where he worked as an art director for Lecram Press. His work for Lecram caught Esther Averill's attention and he began collaborating with Averill and her business partner, Lila Stanley. With their insight, Rojankovsky created Daniel Boone in 1931 featuring fauvist-inspired lithographs celebrating Boone and the American West. The plates were prohibitive to print, so Averill and Stanley started their own Domino Press to print the book. Daniel Boone set a new direction in children's books, but was not a commercial success. In 1933, he began working with Paul Faucher on the Père Castor series. The series integrated bold coloring with games, stories or projects designed to stimulate a child's curiosity and imagination.

In 1941, he moved to the US and began a career of illustrating more than a hundred books, most featuring animals or nature with Little Golden Books. From 1943 to 1970, Rojan illustrated 35 children's books under the imprint. Rojankovsky also wrote books, such as The Great Big Animal Book, published in 1952. In 1956, Frog Went A-Courtin' by John Langstaff won the Caldecott Medal for U.S. picture book illustration from the American Library Association. In the 1950s and 60s, he began working with a new female editor, Margaret McElderry of Simon & Schuster, and produced Over in the Meadow, The Little River, So Small, and A Crowd of Cows.

Rojan died on October 12, 1970, in Bronxville, New York.

== Quote ==
"Two great events determined the course of my childhood. I was taken to the zoo and saw the most marvelous creatures on earth: bears, tigers, monkeys and reindeer, and, while my admiration was running high, I was given a set of color crayons. Naturally, I began immediately to depict the animals which captured my imagination. Also when my elder brothers, who were in schools in the capital, came home for vacation, I tried to copy their drawings and to imitate their paintings."

== Books ==
=== As writer and illustrator ===
- Daniel Boone: les adventures d'un chasseur americain parmi les peaux-rouges (1931)
- The Tall Book of Mother Goose (Simon & Schuster, 1942)
- Grandfather’s Farm Panorama: Ten Feet Long (Platt and Munk, 1943)
- Choo-choo Panorama (Platt and Munk, 1945)
- The Three Bears (Little Golden Books, 1948)
- Favorite Fairy Tales (Simon & Schuster, 1949)
- Farm Animals (Merrigold Press, 1950)
- The Great Big Animal Book (Simon & Schuster, 1950)
- The Great Big Wild Animal Book (Simon & Schuster, 1951)
- The Great Big Animal Book (1952)
- Little Golden Mother Goose (Golden Press, 1957)
- The Outside Cat (Morrow, 1957)
- Animals on the Farm (Knopf, 1962, 1967)
- Animals in the Zoo (1962)
- The Dog and Cat Book (Golden Pleasure Books, 1963)
- An Alphabet of Many Things (Golden Press, 1970)
- The Tall Book of Mother Goose (Harper and Brothers, 1942)

=== With other writers ===
- Flash: The Story of a Horse, a Coach-Dog and the Gypsies, written by Esther Averill (Domino Press, 1934)
- Bourru, the Brown Bear, Written by Rose Fyleman and Lida (George Allen & Unwin, 1936)
- Fluff, the Little Wild Rabbit, written by Lida, translated by Georges Duplaix (Harper & Brothers, 1937)
- The Children’s Year, written by Y. Lacôte (Harper & Brothers, 1937)
- Adventures of Dudley and Gilderoy, written by Algernon Blackwood and Marion B. Cothren (EP Dutton & Co, 1941)
- Cuckoo, written by Lida (Harper & Brothers, 1942)
- How the Camel Got His Hump, written by Rudyard Kipling (Garden City Publishing Co., 1942)
- How the Leopard Got His Spots, written by Rudyard Kipling (Garden City Publishing Co., 1942)
- How the Rhinoceros Got His Skin, written by Rudyard Kipling (Garden City Publishing Co., 1942)
- The Cat That Walked by Himself, written by Rudyard Kipling (Garden City Publishing Co., 1942)
- The Elephant’s Child, written by Rudyard Kipling (Garden City Publishing Co., 1942), Junior Literary Guild Award
- The Golden Book of Birds, written by Hazel Lockwood (Simon & Schuster, 1943)
- Animal Stories, written by Georges Duplaix (Simon & Schuster, 1944)
- Cortez the Conqueror, written by Covelle Newcomb (Random House, 1947)
- The Butterfly that Stamped, written by Rudyard Kipling (Garden City Publishing Co., 1947)
- Big Farmer Big and Little Farmer Little, written by Byron and Kathryn Jackson (Simon & Schuster, 1948)
- Gaston and Josephine, written by Georges Duplaix (Simon and Schuster, 1948)
- Our Puppy, written by Elsa Ruth Nast (Simon & Schuster, 1948)
- The Big Elephant, written by Kathryn Jackson (Golden Book, 1949)
- All Alone, written by Claire Huchet Bishop (Viking Press, 1953), Newbery Honor Book
- The Giant Golden Book of Cat Stories, written by Elizabeth Coatsworth (Simon & Schuster, 1953)
- The Giant Golden Book of Dog Stories, written by Elizabeth Coatsworth (Simon & Schuster, 1953)
- Horse Stories, written by Kate Barnes and Elizabeth Coatsworth (Simon & Schuster, 1954)
- Frog Went A-Courtin', written by John Langstaff (1955)
- I Play at the Beach, written by Dorothy Koch (Holiday House, 1955)
- Balboa, Swordsman and Conquistador, written by Felix Riesenberg, Jr. (Random House, 1956)
- Cartier Sails the St. Lawrence, written by Esther Averill (Harper & Row, 1956)
- I Like the City, written by James L. Mursell (Silver Burdett Company, 1956)
- I Like the Country, written by James L. Mursell (Silver Burdett Company, 1956)
- Over in the Meadow, written by John Langstaff (Harcourt, Brace and Company, 1957)
- The Giant Golden Book of Dogs, Cats and Horses, written by Kate Barnes and Elizabeth Coatsworth (Simon & Schuster, 1957)
- The White Bunny and His Magic Nose, written by Lily Duplaix (Golden Press, 1957)
- Baby Wild Animals, written by John Wallace Purcell (Simon & Schuster, 1958)
- The Cabin Faced West, written by Jean Fritz (Puffin Books, 1958)
- The Little River, written by Ann Rand (Harcourt, Brace and Company, 1959)
- Animal Dictionary, written by Jane Werner Watson (Golden Press, 1960)
- The Defender, written by Nicholas Kalashnikoff (Oxford University Press, 1961), Newbery Honor Book
- The Whilry Bird, written by Dimitry Varley (Knopf, 1961)
- Cricket in a Thicket, written by Aileen Fisher (Scribner, 1963)
- I Can Count, written by Carl Memling (Merrigold Press, 1963)
- The Cow Went Over the Mountain, written by Jeanette Krinsley (Golden Press, 1963)
- Hop, Little Kangaroo, written by Patricia Scarry (Golden Press, 1965)
- Christmas Bear, written by Marie Colmont, translated by Constance Hirsch (Golden Press, 1966)
- I Am a Fox, written by Ole Risom (Golden Press, 1967)
- A Crowd of Cows, written by John Graham (Harcourt, Brace and World, 1968)
- The Falcon Under the Hat: Russian Merry Tales and Fairy Tales, selected and translated by Guy Daniels (Funk & Wagnalls, 1969)
- To Make a Duck Happy, written by Carol E. Lester (Harper & Row, 1969)
- The Giant Golden Bible, written by Elsa Jane Werner (Simon & Schuster, 1946)
- Firkin & The Grey Gangsters, written by Ann Scott-Moncrieff (re-issued by Scotland Street Press, 2021)

=== Wordless Novels ===
- Idylle printanière. no publisher listed. 1934
- Idylle printanière. Pirate edition, no publisher listed. 1938

== See also ==
- Korney Chukovsky
