= Esther Averill =

American children's book writer and illustrator (1902–1992)

- Born: Esther Holden Averill; July 24, 1902; Bridgeport, Connecticut, United States
- Died: May 19, 1992 (aged 89); New York City, New York, United States
- Education: Vassar College (1923)
- Occupations: Illustrator, Publisher, Writer
- Writing career
- Genre: Children's picture books
- Notable work: The Cat Club series
- Notable awards: New York Times Best Children's Book of the Year, for Jenny's Birthday Book (1954)

Esther Averill (July 24, 1902 – May 19, 1992) was an American writer and illustrator best known for the Cat Club picture books, a collection of 13 stories featuring Jenny Linsky, a small black cat who always wears a red scarf. She was also an editor and publisher.

== Life ==
Averill was born in Bridgeport, Connecticut on July 24, 1902, daughter of Charles Ketchum and Helen (Holden) Averill, where she was a teenage cartoonist for a local newspaper. After graduating from Vassar College with honors in 1923, she joined the editorial staff of Women's Wear Daily. In 1925 she moved to Paris, France to work as a photojournalist's assistant. In 1931, Averill founded the Domino Press, which specialized in "children's picture books illustrated by gifted young artists and reproduced by means of the excellent color processes that were available". Domino's first publication was a book entitled Daniel Boone : les adventures d'un chasseur americain parmi les peaux-rogues, illustrated by Feodor Rojankovsky (who later won a U.S. Caldecott Medal for picture book illustration). Averill worked on an English edition of the same title also released in 1931. Domino published several other children's books before it ceased operations in 1938.

Averill returned to the United States in 1941, continuing with Domino Press until it ceased operations and then working in the children's department at the New York Public Library. In 1944, she wrote and illustrated The Cat Club, the first in a series of stories about a cat, Jenny Linsky, who lived in New York City with her master, the benevolent Captain Tinker. Between 1944 and 1972, Averill wrote and illustrated a dozen more stories about Jenny Linsky and her cat friends, all of whom were based on cats Averill owned or knew. The cat club books proved to be Averill's most popular works, and were eventually translated into six languages. Starting in 2003, a series of reissues by the New York Review Children's Collection brought all the Cat Club titles except for Jenny's Bedside Book back into print.

Averill died in New York City on May 19, 1992.

== Cat Club series ==
- The Cat Club, 1944
- The School for Cats, 1947
- Jenny's First Party, 1948
- Jenny's Moonlight Adventure, 1949
- When Jenny Lost Her Scarf, 1951
- Jenny's Adopted Brothers, 1952
- How the Brothers Joined the Cat Club, 1953
- Jenny's Birthday Book, 1954
- Jenny Goes to Sea, 1957
- Jenny's Bedside Book, 1959
- The Fire Cat, 1960
- The Hotel Cat, 1969
- Captains of the City Streets, 1972

== Other works ==
- Daniel Boone, 1931 (with Lila Stanley; illustrated by Feodor Rojankovsky)
- Powder: The Story of a Colt, a Duchess, and the Circus, 1933 (with Lila Stanley; illustrated by Feodor Rojankovsky)
- Fable of a Proud Poppy, 1934 (as John Domino; illustrated by Emile Lahner)
- Flash: The Story of a Horse, a Coach-Dog, and the Gypsies, 1934 (illustrated by Feodor Rojankovsky)
- Political Propaganda in Children's Books of the French Revolution, 1935
- The Voyages of Jacques Cartier, 1937 (illustrated by Feodor Rojankovsky)
- The Adventures of Jack Ninepins, 1944
- Daniel Boone, 1945 (new text for the 1931 title, same illustrations by Feodor Rojankovsky)
- King Philip: The Indian Chief, 1950 (illustrated by Vera Belsky)
- Cartier Sails the St. Lawrence, 1956 (new text of the 1937 title, same illustrations by Feodor Rojankovsky)
- Eyes on the World: The Story and Work of Jacques Callot, 1969

== See also ==
- The New York Review Children's Collection
