= Jane Werner Watson =

American writer

- Born: July 11, 1915; Fond du Lac, Wisconsin, U.S.
- Died: 2004 (aged 88–89)
- Education: University of Wisconsin
- Occupation: Writer
- Writing career
- Pen name: Elisa Jane Werner Watson; Jane Werner; Annie North Bedford; Monica Hill; Elsa Ruth Nast; W.K. Jasner, A.B. Bedford
- Genre: Children's literature
- Notable work: Little Golden Books

Jane Werner Watson, born Elsa Jane Werner (July 11, 1915 – 2004) was an American children's author. She also wrote under the names Elsa Jane Werner Watson, Jane Werner, Annie North Bedford, Monica Hill, Elsa Ruth Nast, W. K. Jasner, and A. N. Bedford.

== Biography ==
Jane Werner was born on July 11, 1915, in Fond du Lac, Wisconsin, the daughter of Henry Charles Werner, a physician, and Elsa, née Nast. She earned a B.A. degree from the University of Wisconsin in 1936. She was one of the original editors of the Little Golden Books series, which were published by Western Publishing in conjunction with Simon and Schuster. She went on to write approximately 150 books in the Little Golden Books series.

In 1954 she married Earnest C. Watson, a Caltech physicist on sabbatical leave, at Tarbert in Scotland. Until his retirement from Caltech in 1959, the couple spent weekends and holidays in Santa Barbara. From 1960 to 1962 Earnest Watson worked as a science attaché to the United States Embassy in New Delhi. While they lived in New Delhi, the couple formed a large collection of Indian miniatures.

Papers are held at the University of Minnesota.

== Works ==
- Noah's Ark (1943) illustrated by Tibor Gergely
- The Golden Book of Poetry (1947)
- The Little Golden Book of Hymns (1947) illustrated by Corinne Malvern
- The Fuzzy Duckling (1949) illustrated by Alice and Martin Provensen
- Walt Disney's Cinderella (1950)
- Frosty the Snow Man (1950) illustrated by Corinne Malvern
- Albert's Zoo: A Stencil Book (1951)
- The Giant Golden Book of Elves and Fairies: With Assorted Pixies, Mermaids, Brownies, Witches and Leprechauns (1951)
- Mickey Mouse and His Spaceship (1952)
- Walt Disney's Snow White and the Seven Dwarfs (1952)
- The Christmas Story (1952) illustrated by Eloise Wilkin
- The Golden Geography: a child's introduction to the world (1952) illustrated by Cornelius DeWitt
- Animal Friends (1953) illustrated by Garth Williams
- Walt Disney's Cinderella and Other Stories (1953) with Steffi Fletcher
- Walt Disney's Pinocchio and Other Stories (1953) with Steffi Fletcher
- The Golden Book of Stories from the New Testament (1953) illustrated by Alice and Martin Provensen
- Walt Disney's Living Desert (1954)
- The Golden Mother Goose (1954) illustrated by Alice and Martin Provensen
- The Giant Golden Book of Elves and Fairies: With Assorted Pixies, Mermaids, Brownies, Witches and Leprechauns (1954) illustrated by Garth Williams
- The Golden Book of Bible Stories from the Old Testament (1954) illustrated by Feodor Rojanovsky
- Land Nearest the Stars: A Journey by Taxi Across Australia (1955) as Monica Hill
- Walt Disney's Vanishing Prairie (1955)
- The True Story of Smokey the Bear (1955) illustrated by Feodor Rojanovsky
- The Iliad and the Odyssey: The Heroic Story of the Trojan War, the Fabulous Adventures of Odysseus (1956) illustrated by Alice and Martin Provensen
- My Little Golden Book About God (1956) illustrated by Eloise Wilkin
- The World We Live In (1956) adapted from the original version by Lincoln Barnett
- Walt Disney's Sleeping Beauty (1957)
- The World of Science (1958)
- The Giant Golden Book of Dinosaurs and Other Prehistoric Reptiles (1960)
- Sometimes I'm Afraid (1971)
- Sometimes I'm Jealous (1971)
- Sometimes I Get Angry (1971)
- My friend the Doctor (1972)
- My friend the Dentist (1972)
- The Volga (1972)
- A Parade of Soviet Holidays (1974)
- Whales: Friendly Dolphins and Mighty Giants of the Sea (1975)
- Alternate Energy Sources (1979)
- The First Americans: Tribes of North America (1980)
- Deserts of the World: Future Threat or Promise? (1980)
- The Case of the Vanishing Spaceship (1982)
