= Norse Gods and Giants =

Children's book by Ingri and Edgar Parin d'Aulaire

- Author: Ingri and Edgar Parin d'Aulaire
- Illustrator: The d'Aulaires
- Genre: Children's literature, mythology
- Publisher: Doubleday
- Publication date: 1967
- Publication place: United States
- Media type: Print (hardcover)
- Pages: 154 pp
- ISBN: 978-0385072359 (1967); ISBN 0385049080 (1986); ISBN 159017125X (2005)
- OCLC: 303177
- Dewey Decimal: 293/.13
- LC Class: BL860 .D355 1967; BL860 .D355 1986; BL860 .D355 2005

Norse Gods and Giants is a children's book written and illustrated by Ingri and Edgar Parin d'Aulaire and published by Doubleday in 1967. It was reissued by Doubleday in 1986 as d'Aulaires' Norse Gods and Giants and by New York Review Books in 2005 as d'Aulaires' Book of Norse Myths.

The 154-page book is organized as a collection of 30 Norse myths, with color illustrations throughout, from "The first gods and giants" and "The creation of the world" to "Ragnarokk, the destiny of the gods" and "A new world". The 2005 Library of Congress catalog summary called it a companion to Ingri and Edgar Parin d'Aulaire's Book of Greek myths, published by Doubleday in 1962, a 192-page collection of 46 Greek myths. The Greek and Norse collections are the couple's second and third most widely held works in WorldCat libraries, after their Caldecott Medal-winning picture book Abraham Lincoln (Doubleday, 1957).

== See also ==
- Norse mythology
- Norse pantheon
