= Cinderella, or the Little Glass Slipper =

1954 picture book by Marcia Brown

- Author: Marcia Brown
- Illustrator: Marcia Brown
- Cover artist: Urpatz
- Genre: Children's book
- Publisher: Scribner Press
- Publication date: 1954
- Publication place: United States

Cinderella, or the Little Glass Slipper is a book adapted and illustrated by Marcia Brown. Released by Charles Scribner's Sons, the book is a retelling of the story of Cinderella as written by Charles Perrault, and was the recipient of the Caldecott Medal for illustration in 1955. The book takes place in France, in a palace similar to other Cinderella stories.

== Plot ==
A widower marries a haughty woman with two daughters of her own. The woman and the two daughters hate the man's gentle and beautiful daughter, who they call Cinderella, and treat her cruelly. Cinderella is always assigned to do the chores around the house and forced to sleep in the attic.

One day, it is announced that the prince will hold a royal ball and he invites all the ladies of quality in the kingdom. Cinderella wants to attend, but her stepmother makes her stay home to clean the whole house. Cinderella cries as her stepsisters leave, but then is surprised by the appearance of her fairy godmother. After Cinderella explains her dilemma, her fairy godmother uses her magic power to help Cinderella. The fairy godmother transforms all the mice, lizards, and rats into horses and coachmen for a golden coach, and creates for Cinderella a gown made of gold and silver and slippers made of glass. The only thing her fairy godmother asks is for Cinderella to return home by midnight before the magic ends.

Entering the ball, Cinderella is unrecognized by her stepsisters and dazzles everyone there, especially the prince. The prince pays her special attention because he has never seen her before. As Cinderella dances with the prince, she loses track of time. When the clock strikes midnight, Cinderella flees from the ball and the prince, accidentally leaving one of her glass slippers behind. The prince finds the glass slipper and vows to marry the girl whose foot it fits. As soon as Cinderella gets home, her gown turns back to rags, the horse and the coachmen turn back to animals, but the glass slipper remains as is.

The next morning, the stepsisters tell her that the prince is in love with some unknown lady that was at the ball last night. The prince goes house to house to see who fits the glass slipper, and finally arrives at the home of Cinderella. The stepsisters try to fit their feet into the glass slipper but are unsuccessful. Cinderella then tries the slipper and it is a perfect fit. A few days later, the prince marries Cinderella as promised. Cinderella forgives her stepsisters for their past cruelty.

== Theme ==
Morality and grace are primary themes and are shown through the main character's (Cinderella) ability to achieve success through perseverance and positive behavior when faced with negative circumstances.

== Reception ==
Kirkus Reviews praised Cinderella as having "the smoothness of a good translation and a unique charm to her (Brown's) feathery light pictures." and concluded that it was "Gentle."

Awards
Preceded by Madeline's Rescue	Caldecott Medal recipient 1955	Succeeded by Frog Went A-Courtin'
