= Bertha Morris Parker =

American science writer (1890–1980)

Bertha Morris Parker (1890–1980) was an American educator, science writer, and children's author best known as the principal author of the 16-volume Golden Book Encyclopedia (1959). She worked for many years at the Chicago Museum of Science and Industry, where she was involved in the development of educational materials for young readers. Parker wrote or co-wrote numerous books on natural science, general knowledge, and early childhood learning.

== Early life and education ==
Bertha Morris Parker was born in 1890 in Rochester, Illinois. She attended a small school there until it was time for high school at which point she attended Springfield High School since there was no high school in Rochester at the time. She spent a year at Oberlin College, followed by a summer at Columbia University, before moving to the University of Chicago in 1912. She earned a B.S. from the University of Chicago in 1914, an S.B. in 1915, and an M.S. in 1923. For her master's she worked under Henry Chandler Cowles and completed a thesis on The Ecology of Crop Rotation.

== Career ==
Parker started teaching in 1909 in Springfield, Illinois and then moved to the University of Chicago Laboratory School where she taught and served as department chair until 1955.

Parker was the editor of Science News Notes, which was published by the National Council on Elementary Science, from 1934 until 1938.

After a conversation with Charles Hubbard Judd in the 1930s, she began to write a series of books first on social science and then moving into different science topics. The first of the books was published in 1941; the books were aimed for children between grade 1 and grade 8. Ultimately she wrote over 80 books, some of which were published into other languages including Japanese, Korean, Greek, Italian, and French. Her written work included serving as principal author and editor of the first edition of The Golden Book Encyclopedia that was published beginning in 1959 by Western Publishing (Golden Press).

== Legacy ==
Parker died in 1980.

== Selected works ==
Many of Parker's books on individual science books were reviewed including Dinosaurs, Water, Saving Our Wildlife, Electricity, Plants, and Natural History.
