= Sheilah Beckett =

American illustrator

- Born: September 5, 1913; Vancouver, British Columbia
- Died: November 17, 2013 (aged 100); Ossining, New York
- Known for: Illustration
- Notable work: Little Golden Books
- Partner: J. Frederick Smith

Sheilah Beckett (September 5, 1913 - November 17, 2013) was an American illustrator, known for her work on the Little Golden Books series. She illustrated more than 70 classic fairy-tale titles for Little Golden Books, among them The Twelve Days of Christmas, The Twelve Dancing Princesses, and Snow White and Rose Red. She also illustrated several contemporary volumes of poetry, and a variety of 18th and 19th century adult works, including Lowell Baird's 1959 translation of Candide and a 1940 adaptation of Gilbert and Sullivan's HMS Pinafore. At the time of her death, Beckett resided and worked in Ossining, New York. Her final works done at the age of 99 were on the computer. Becket lived to be 100 years old.

Beckett got her professional start upon graduation from high school, creating advertising artwork for The Doyle Conte Co., a Portland, OR based department store. She quickly moved onto a job in Los Angeles, “illustrating a series of Gilbert & Sullivan books.” A series of events led her to New York where she obtained an artist representative and found work illustrating children's books. Shortly thereafter, Beckett joined the Charles E Cooper studio as the first female illustrator. As an illustrator with the Charles E. Cooper Studio, Beckett continued illustrating children's books as well as taking on advertising jobs. When television became popular, there wasn’t as much illustration happening as before. This led to the loss in business of the Charles E. Cooper Studio. She had steady assignments with Necco Wafers and Whitman's Chocolates but preferred illustrating children's books and Christmas cards. One of her longest running clients was the American Artist Group greeting cards. They too lost business when the price of stamps increased.
