= Revels =

American seasonal stage performances

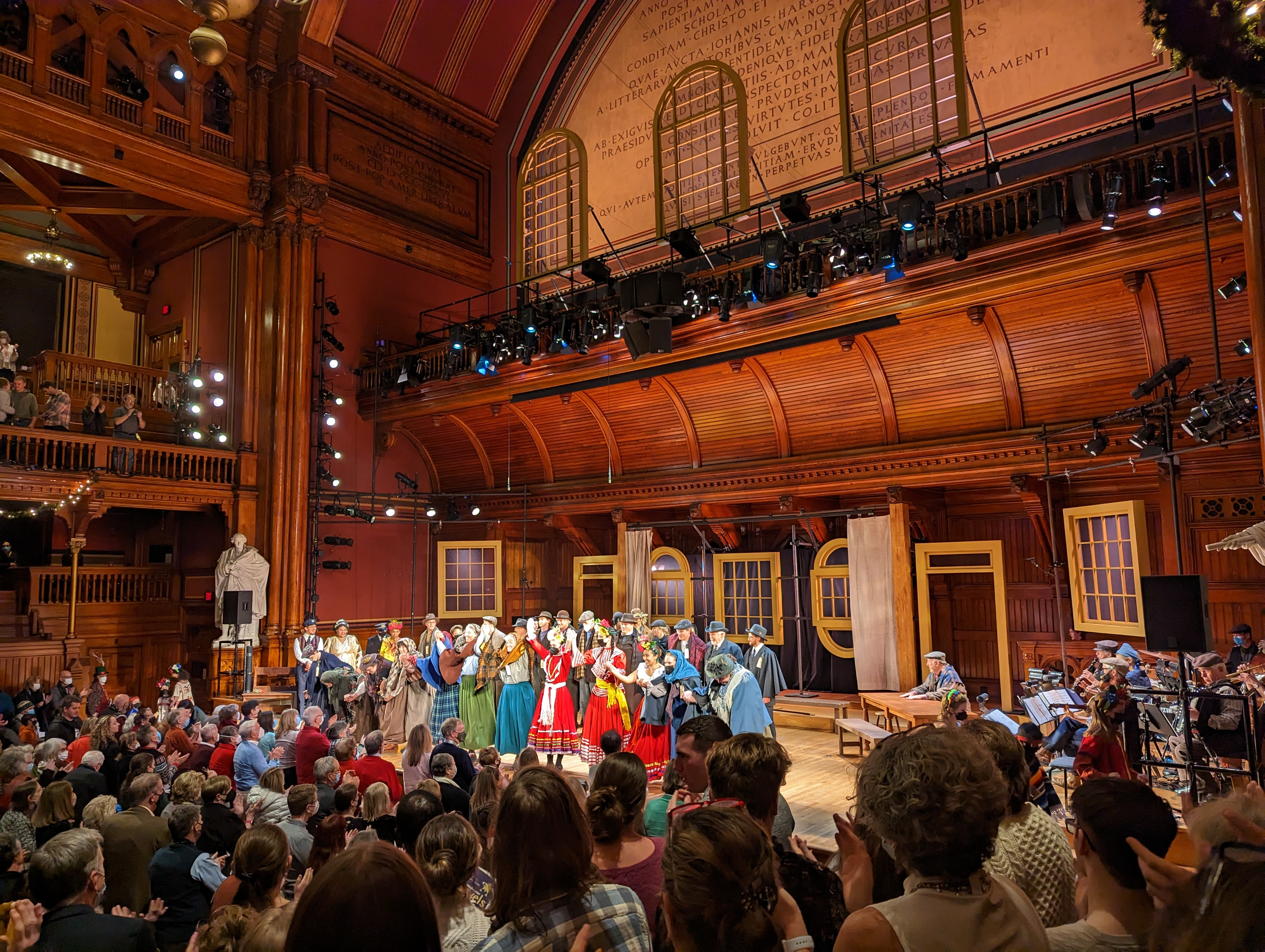
A 2022 Revels performance at Sanders Theatre at Harvard University

Revels is a contemporary series of American seasonal stage performances, incorporating singing, dancing, recitals, and theatrics loosely organized around a central theme or narrative. The folk-tradition-based performances started in 1957, were restarted in 1971, and now occur in multiple cities around the US.

== History ==
Performances were initially given at Christmas time as the Christmas Revels at Town Hall in New York City in 1957, which involved singing, dancing, recitals, theatrics (usually as brief skits, often humorous), and usually some audience participation, all appropriate to the holiday season. Performers were usually local, often non-professional, and frequently young.

The events were founded by John Langstaff as Christmas entertainments; he and his daughter Carol later started producing The Christmas Revels in Cambridge, Massachusetts in 1971, at Harvard University's Sanders Theater, where it has frequently played to sold-out houses.

Until his death in 2005, Langstaff, assisted by members of his family, led or fostered several similar Revels organizations in various American cities. His ability to "get it done" as well as his teaching and performing style, was admired by children's television producer Jonathan Meath, who was a tenor on two of their CD albums entitled Welcome Yule and Victorian Revels.

The present organization, Revels Inc, produces events in ten cities across the United States, including four in the northeast region of the country. Additional seasonal celebratory events mark spring and summer in some cities.

== Format ==
The productions echo English theatrical precedents of the 16th century and earlier. Professional singers, actors and musicians are mixed with talented amateurs and tradition-bearers, often brought in to share a featured culture's music, dance, or ritual in an authentic manner. There is almost always a children's chorus, which performs songs, dances, and games from the themed period or location. Traditional English Morris dancing is often incorporated, adapted somewhat to the cultural theme of any particular year.

Reviewers have especially mentioned the dance and the upbeat nature of the performance.

Each year's Christmas Revels draws upon a different era or culture's Christmas and winter solstice traditions. For example, the 2008 Christmas Revels in Cambridge were based on music, songs, and dance inspired by writer Thomas Hardy's beloved Wessex. The earliest performances drew from medieval English traditions; the Mummers' Play is retained (albeit sometimes altered) no matter what time period or culture is being featured.

There usually is audience singing encouraged during several parts of the performance. Other traditions include ending every first half of the production with Sydney Carter's "Lord of the Dance" hymn. After the last verse, the audience is encouraged to dance along with the cast, out into the lobby of Memorial Hall at the Cambridge Revels performances. Author Susan Cooper wrote a poem for the Christmas Revels production that is recited near the end of the second half of each performance.

The annual celebrations have been expanded to several other American cities, and there exist songbooks, production guides, and commercial recordings to assist those unfamiliar with ancient folk music and dancing. The recordings have sometimes included noted performers in the particular folk tradition featured in a given year, such as Appalachian dulcimer player and singer Jean Ritchie, who appeared on 1982's Wassail! Wassail! An Early American Christmas Revels.

The events combine professional paid performers with unpaid volunteers, who often participate in choruses, dances, and crowd scenes. Both adults and children spanning a wide range of ages are present on stage and in the audience. In addition, a large number of volunteers help with behind-the-scenes work, such as costumes, set building, promotion, and fund-raising.

== Locations ==
As of 2019, at least ten independent Revels organizations are active in the US:

- Cambridge Revels: Cambridge, Massachusetts
- Revels North: Hanover, New Hampshire- Closing at the end of 2025 on December 31 EST
- New York Revels: New York, New York
- Washington Revels: Washington, DC
- Revels Houston: Houston, Texas
- Rocky Mountain Revels: Boulder, Colorado
- Santa Barbara Revels: Santa Barbara, California
- California Revels: Oakland, California
- Portland Revels: Portland, Oregon
- Puget Sound Revels: Tacoma, Washington

== See also ==
- Dickens fair
- Master of the Revels
- Renaissance Fair
