= Gladys Malvern =

American novelist

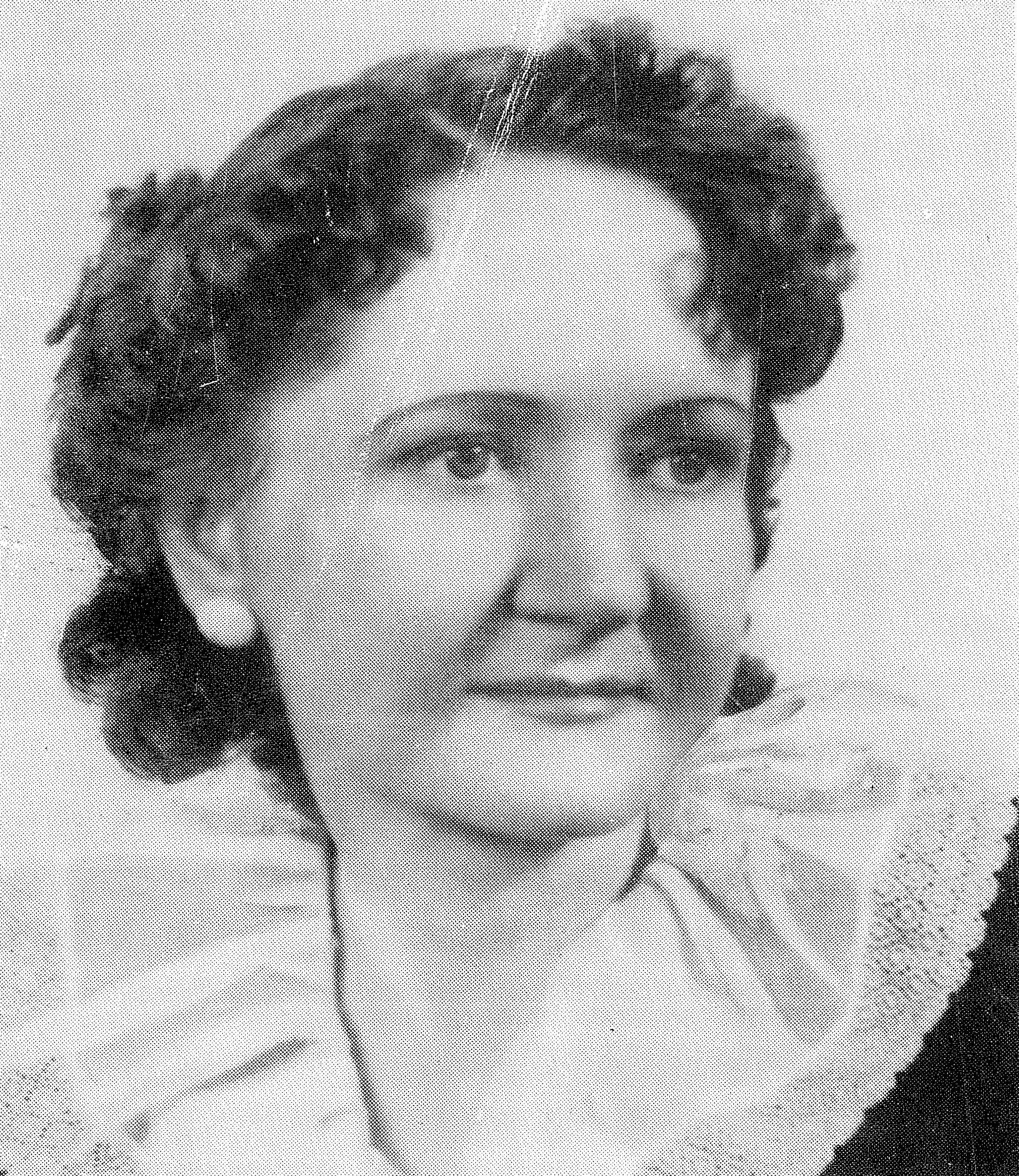
Gladys Malvern, actress and author of Behold Your Queen!

Gladys Malvern (July 17, 1897 – November 16, 1962) was an American vaudeville and Broadway actress, radio script writer, and novel writer. As a child actress, she appeared in the 1908 Broadway production of The Man Who Stood Still. Gladys often collaborated on stage with her younger sister Corinne Malvern, who also illustrated her books. Gladys Malvern is perhaps best remembered for her prolific writing of historical and biographical novels for young adults, including The Foreigner, According to Thomas and Behold Your Queen!.

== Biography ==
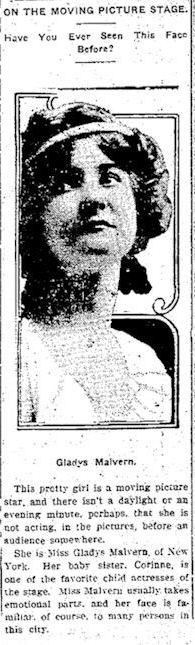
Gladys Malvern in 1910 newspaper article

Gladys Malvern was born in Newark, New Jersey on July 17, 1897, the daughter of Edward Malvern and Cora Lillian Malvern, a theater company wardrobe mistress. She was raised as a stage child by her mother in New York, New Jersey, Virginia, and California.

=== Theater years (1900–1920) ===
Young Gladys Malvern won her first role on a New York stage at the age of three. In 1908, at age 11, Gladys appeared at the Circle Theater on Broadway in The Man Who Stood Still. By 1910, the two Malvern sisters were working regularly in traveling vaudeville productions, as well as in the burgeoning New York movie industry; Gladys as an ingenue and Corinne as "fairies, babies, witches, and other funny little people." By the age of 14, Gladys began playing leading roles in traveling stock theater companies. Her fellow troupers called her "the youngest stock leading woman in the business." When interviewed about this period in her life, Malvern is quoted as saying:

…until I was twenty-one, home to me was anywhere—hotels, trains, boarding houses; for my sister, Corinne Malvern, and I were ‘stage children.’ When I stopped being a ‘stage child,’ I became what they called an ingenue, and then a leading lady. But by this time I had decided I didn't like wandering about, and I began to think how nice it would be to have a home like other people.

=== Life in Los Angeles (1921–1933) ===
During the 1920s, the Malvern family moved to Los Angeles, where Corinne worked as a fashion artist, and Gladys began working at a department store. Later, Gladys began writing copy for advertising agencies, while her sister Corinne studied art under Theodore Lukits. According to census records, at some point during this time period Gladys married, and subsequently divorced. After the publication and success of her first few novels, Gladys moved back to New York with her sister; both of them working from an apartment which overlooked the Hudson River. Of this period in her life, Malvern was quoted as saying:

Advertising is a very good business. I liked it immensely and stuck with it for about twelve years. But after work, being very stubborn in this matter, I continued to write. And I wrote. And I wrote. Finally—oh, after I'd torn up any number of manuscripts—I sold a book… And somehow or other I began to feel encouraged. In fact, after I'd sold three novels, I felt so brave I gave up my advertising job. We sold the lamps and the easy chairs and most of the books, and came blithely to New York.

=== Novels for young adults (1934–1962) ===
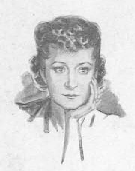
Gladys Malvern, sketched by Corinne Malvern, appearing on dust jackets of early books

Having learned the discipline of writing from her 12 years as an advertising writer and copy editor, Malvern produced several successful novels for young adults in the first years following her return to New York. In 1943, Gladys Malvern penned Curtain Going Up, a widely read biography of 20th-century actress and legend, Katharine Cornell. The same year, Malvern won the Julia Ellsworth Ford Foundation Award for the historical novel, Valiant Minstrel: The Story of Sir Henry Lauder. Gladys Malvern continued writing biographies of other performers, including Joseph Jefferson, Anna Pavlova and Rossini. She also occasionally wrote under the pseudonyms Vahrah von Klopp and Sabra Lee Corbin.

Malvern corresponded with actress Helen Hayes in 1944 about a potential biographical story for American Girl magazine, but never published her story. It is now available as a 12-page part of the Malvern Papers, currently held at the New York Public Library in the "Performing Arts Research Collection".

In 1958, Malvern's Behold Your Queen!, a story of the Biblical character of Esther, was a main selection of the Junior Literary Guild. Malvern wrote several other Biblical stories, including The Foreigner - A Story of Ruth, According to Thomas, Tamar and Saul's Daughter.

Gladys Malvern never returned to the stage, but she would go on to write more than 40 successful historical novels, including Patriot's Daughter - The Story of Anastasia Lafayette and Dear Wife - A Story of the American Revolution, many of them illustrated by her sister Corinne, who died in 1956. Gladys moved to Weston, Connecticut, where she continued to write until her own death in November 1962.

=== Posthumous editions ===
Several novels were published posthumously by Vanguard Press in 1971, including The Six Wives of Henry VIII and The World of Lady Jane Grey. However, by 1990, most of the books authored by Gladys Malvern had gone out of print, and could only be found in auctions and the rare book market. In 2011, several Malvern titles were re-issued by publisher Special Edition Books. In 2012, many Malvern titles were re-issued as interactive ebooks by YA publisher Beebliome Books, including titles such as Stephanie and So Great a Love.

== Selected bibliography ==
- According to Thomas. 1947. New York, R.M. McBride & Co.
- Ann Lawrence of Old New York. 1947. New York, Julian Messner
- Behold Your Queen! 1951. New York, Longmans, Green & Co., New York
- Blithe Genius; The Story of Rossini. 1959. New York, Longmans, Green
- Dancing Star: the Story of Anna Pavlova. 1942. New York, J. Messner
- Dear Wife. 1953. New York, Longmans, Green & Co.
- Eric's Girls. 1949. New York, J. Messner
- Foreigner, The. 1954. New York, Longmans, Green & Co.,
- Gloria, Ballet Dancer. (A Romance for Young Moderns; also pub. in German as Gloria). 1946. New York, J. Messner, Inc.
- Heart's Conquest. 1962. Philadelphia, McRae Smith Company
- Hollywood Star. (A Romance for Young Moderns). 1953. New York, J. Messner
- Jonica's Island. 1945. New York, Julian Messner, Inc.
- Kin. 1931 New York, Dodd, Mead. (written as Vahrah von Klopp)
- Mamzelle. 1955. Philadelphia, McRae Smith
- Patriot's Daughter. 1960. Philadelphia, McRae Smith Company
- Prima Ballerina. (A Romance for Young Moderns.) 1951. New York, J. Messner
- Queen's Lady, The. 1963. McRae Smith Company, Philadelphia (posthumous)
- Rhoda of Cyprus. 1958. Philadelphia, McRae Smith Company
- Rogues and Vagabonds. 1959. Philadelphia, McRae Smith Company
- Saul's Daughter. 1956. New York, Longmans, Green & Co.
- Secret Sign, The. 1961. Abelard-Schuman, New York
- Six Wives of Henry VIII, The. 1972. Vanguard Press, Inc., New York (posthumous)
- Stephanie. 1956. Philadelphia, McRae Smith
- Tamar. 1952. New York, Longmans, Green & Co.
- The World of Lady Jane Grey. 1964. New York, Vanguard Press (posthumous)
- There's Always Forever. 1957. New York, Longmans, Green
- Valiant Minstrel, the Story of Sir Harry Lauder. 1943. New York, J. Messner, Inc.

== See also ==
- Corinne Malvern
- Vaudeville
- Book of Ruth
- Esther
- Young adult fiction

== Additional sources ==
- News of the Theaters, Chicago Daily Tribune, January 22, 1907
- Autobiographical Sketch of Gladys Malvern, The Junior Book of Authors, Second Edition, H.W. Wilson Publishers, 1951 ISBN 978-0-8242-0028-2
- Barbara Sicherman, Carol Hurd Gree, Notable American Women: the Modern Period, Volume 4, Harvard University Press, 1986 ISBN 978-0-674-62733-8
- John T. Gillespie, Historical Fiction for Young Readers, Greenwood Publishing Group, 2008, ISBN 978-1-59158-621-0
