= Frog Went A-Courtin' (book) =

1955 picture book by John Langstaff

- First edition
- Author: John Langstaff
- Illustrator: Feodor Rojankovsky
- Genre: Children's picture book
- Publisher: Harcourt
- Publication date: 1955
- Publication place: United States

Frog Went A-Courtin' is a book by John Langstaff and illustrated by Feodor Rojankovsky. Released by Harcourt, it was the recipient of the Caldecott Medal for illustration in 1956. It is based on the folk song "Frog Went a-Courting". In 1961, Weston Woods Studios made an iconographic version of the story produced and directed by Morton Schindel, narrated by the author with music by Arthur Kleiner, culminating in a sing-along, sung by the story's narrator. In 2007, the film has been remade with narration and music by Jack Sundrud and Rusty Young.

Awards
| Preceded by Cinderella, or the Little Glass Slipper | Caldecott Medal recipient 1956 | Succeeded by A Tree Is Nice |
