= The Signal (soundtrack) =

The Signal (Original Motion Picture Soundtrack)

Film score by Nima Fakhrara
- Released: June 10, 2014
- Recorded: 2013–2014
- Studio: Sound & Visions Creatives, Los Angeles; Skywalker Sound, Lucas Valley
- Genre: Film score
- Length: 49:30
- Label: Varèse Sarabande
- Producer: Nima Fakhrara; William Eubank

Nima Fakhrara chronology
Gatchaman (2013)	The Signal (Original Motion Picture Soundtrack) (2014)	The Pyramid (2014)

The Signal (Original Motion Picture Soundtrack) is the film score soundtrack to the 2014 film The Signal, directed by William Eubank. The film's original score was written by Nima Fakhrara featuring 22 tracks with a runtime of 49 minutes released under the Varèse Sarabande label on June 10, 2014.

== Development ==
In December 2013, it was announced that Iranian composer and experimental musical instrument designer Nima Fakhrara would provide the industrial score for The Signal. Fakhrara, who has a background as a dulcimer player and student of Persian classical music, approached the production seeking to contribute, having been a fan of Eubank's earlier film Love. Eubank recalled that he would discuss with Fakhrara at his studio discussing about the films and the sequences they liked and played few cues under his supervision which he was impressed with.

As half of the film takes place indoors, he produced a number of custom instruments for the film designed to limit resonance, including a pagoda made of ceramic insulators, gongs, a number of bowed instruments, a steel marimba, and a tenor violin fashioned with viola strings. When the characters journey outdoors, the music and instruments change. A number of the custom instruments had to be transported to Skywalker Ranch, where Fakhrara was mastering the score. The sounds from those instruments were sampled and implemented in his keyboard, where he would also manipulate those non-familiar sounds to add more effects.

Aminé Ramer served as the film's music supervisor, who selected various classical pieces to be used in the film. Fakhrara and Eubank went through 45 versions of the music for the opening credits scene before they chose a final version.

== Release ==
A soundtrack album was released by Varèse Sarabande on June 10, 2014. The album artwork was also issued after its release, featuring the teaser poster of an astronaut walking in multiple doors; it is further pressed in a limited edition vinyl LP scheduled to be released later.

== Reception ==
=== Critical reception ===
Pete Simons of Synchrotones while calling it as a "slick, minimalistic electronic score", he found it to be "atmospheric and mesmerizing at best, yet a little underwhelming". Heather Phares of AllMusic rated the album three out of five calling it as an "engrossing score". Matt Patches of IGN wrote "The Signal is a satisfying sensory experience, its chilling-if-not-standard mood music from Nima Fakhrara amplifying its geometrically inclined photography." jfriar of The Victoria Advocate wrote "The ambient score by composer Nima Fakhrara is the perfect accompaniment to the film's aesthetic style." Roger Moore of The Oklahoman called it as "eerie", and William Goss of The Austin Chronicle described it as "half-melancholy, half-foreboding".

=== Post-release ===
The score was shortlisted as one among the 114 contenders for the Best Original Score category at the 87th edition of the Academy Awards. The Italian dark wave band Confrontational mentioned The Signal's score on their best scores at that time it was fond of, calling it as a "brilliantly haunting score that really worked well with the movie".

== Track listing ==
The Signal (Original Motion Picture Soundtrack) track listing
No.	Title	Length
1.	"Good Luck"	2:42
2.	"Get the Pony"	1:30
3.	"Penly Ln."	2:07
4.	"Clocks"	1:14
5.	"4, 5, 6"	0:51
6.	"Hallway Roll"	4:48
7.	"Agitate"	1:16
8.	"Wake Up"	3:01
9.	"Door Kick"	1:54
10.	"Your Protection"	1:27
11.	"Hailey"	1:19
12.	"What's Wrong with You"	1:00
13.	"Road"	0:56
14.	"Reunion"	1:46
15.	"Visitor Center"	4:28
16.	"Check Point"	1:21
17.	"Jonah"	2:31
18.	"Goodbye"	4:37
19.	"I Am Sorry"	2:35
20.	"Nomad"	1:32
21.	"The End"	2:48
22.	"2.3.5.41" (Free the Robots, featuring William Grundler)	3:47
Total length:		49:30

== Additional music ==
Other songs featured in the film include:

- "La villa dei delitti" by Gabriele Bazzi Berneri
- "Tell Me Now" by Generationals
- "Union" by Deptford Goth
- "Piano Piece in A Major" by Mark Gordon
- "Pace, Pace, Mio Dio (From La forza del destino)" by Emilie De Voght
- "I'll Pretend" by Glen Morris
- "Ever Night Lulu" by Johnny Appleseed
- Charles Gounod's "Ave Maria" (which he arranged from Johann Sebastian Bach's 1st keyboard Prelude in C major from the Well-Tempered Clavier.)

== Personnel ==
Credits adapted from liner notes.

- Music – Nima Fakhrara
- Producer – Nima Fakhrara, William Eubank
- Programming – Ramin Kousha, Sam Murphy
- Sampler – Lewis Meyer
- Mastered By – Patricia Sullivan
- Musical assistance – Maxwell Sterling
- Music supervisor – Aminé Ramer
- Music co-ordinator – Drew Denton
- Executive producer – James Gibb
- Guitar – Blake Straus
- Strings – Navid Hejazi
- Vocals – William Grundler

== Chart performance ==
Chart performance for The Signal (Original Motion Picture Soundtrack)
Chart (2014)	Peak position
UK Soundtrack Albums (OCC)	48
US Top Soundtracks (Billboard)	25
