= Digital signal (disambiguation) =

A digital signal is a signal that transfers digital data.

Digital signal may also refer to:

- Digital signal (signal processing), a discrete time, quantized representation of an analog signal
- Digital data signal
- Signals in digital broadcasting
- Signals in digital electronics
- Signals in digital data transmission
- Signals in digital telephony
