= Tootle =

Book by Gertrude Crampton

First edition

Tootle (ISBN 0307020975) is a children's book written by Gertrude Crampton and illustrated by Tibor Gergely in 1945. It is part of Simon & Schuster's Little Golden Books series. As of 2001, it was the all-time third best-selling hardcover children's book in English, in the USA.

== Plot ==
The protagonist is Tootle, a baby 4-4-2 locomotive attending train school. Tootle hopes to grow up to be the Flyer on the New York-Chicago route. His schoolwork includes tasks such as stopping at red flags and pulling a dining car without spilling the soup. His most important lesson is that he must always stay on the rails. Bill, his good friend and teacher, tells Tootle that trains are not professional unless they get 100 A+ on staying on the rails, no matter what.

One day, when Tootle is practicing this lesson, a horse challenges him to a race to the river. Tootle is faster than the horse, but loses his lead when he turns a curve, so he gets off the tracks to tie with the horse. In the days that follow, Tootle becomes fond of playing in the meadow and not staying on the rails. Bill quickly discovers what Tootle has been doing. Not wanting to take away Tootle's chance at being a Flyer, Bill concocts a plan with the mayor to put Tootle back on the tracks.

One day when Tootle is rolling down the tracks, he hops off to play in the meadow, but sees red flags everywhere in the grass. He grows frustrated at having to stop at red flags, as trains hate nothing more than stopping. Tootle then sees Bill with a green flag over the rails. Having learned his lesson, Tootle gets back on the track and says that playing in the meadow only brings red flags to trains. In response to the lesson learned, the town cheers for him and rewards Tootle the Flyer the route to Chicago. Many years later, an older and wiser Tootle teaches some new locomotives lessons, including "Stay on the rails no matter what".

== See also ==
- The Little Engine That Could
- The Railway Series
