= Signal, Missouri =

Extinct hamlet in Missouri, U.S.

Coordinates: 38°01′52″N 91°48′56″W

Signal is an extinct town in northern Phelps County, in the U.S. state of Missouri.

A post office was established at Signal in 1903, and remained in operation until 1905. It is unknown why the name "Signal" was applied to this community.
