= Dorothy A. Bennett =

American anthropologist, astronomer and author (1909–1999)

Dorothy Agnes Bennett
- Born: August 31, 1909; Minneapolis, Minnesota, US
- Died: February 9, 1999 (aged 89); Taos, New Mexico, US
- Education: University of Minnesota
- Occupations: anthropologist, astronomer, author, curator, publisher
- Employer(s): American Museum of Natural History, Little Golden Books, Simon and Schuster

Dorothy Agnes Bennett (August 31, 1909 – February 9, 1999) was an American anthropologist, astronomer, curator, publisher, and author. She was the first assistant curator of the Hayden Planetarium, and co-created the Little Golden Books franchise.

== Early life and education ==
Born in Minneapolis, Dorothy Bennett was the only child of architect Daniel Bennett (born 1869) and wife Marion (born 1879). Bennett studied astronomy and anthropology at the University of Minnesota, where she also participated in the Women's Athletic Association. Upon graduating with a B.A. in English in 1930, she moved to New York, having been denied the chance to study in Africa with an anthropology professor on account of her gender.

== Career ==
=== The American Museum of Natural History ===
Having been given a timeframe of 30 days to find a job in New York by her mother, Bennett was hired as an assistant by the American Museum of Natural History's Department of Public Education. Within a year, she was promoted to Assistant Curator, and she organized high-attending programs for the Evening Elementary School Students' Association (which consisted of international adult students), as well as for the Museum's Junior Astronomy Club. Nobel Prize winner Roy J. Glauber was a member of the club and credited it for inspiring his passion in science. In the evenings, Bennett attended anthropology classes at Columbia University, taught by Margaret Mead, Ruth Benedict, and Alfred Radcliffe-Brown. Bennett substitute-taught one of Mead's courses in 1931.

Upon the opening of the Hayden Planetarium in 1935, Bennett was promoted to assistant curator of astronomy and the Hayden Planetarium, where she delivered over 1,000 lectures between 1935 and 1939. In 1937, she created and spearheaded the Hayden Planetarium-Grace Peruvian Eclipse Expedition to Cerro de Pasco, Peru to view a particularly long solar eclipse on June 8.

=== Publishing ===
Bennett's success in the Museum's education department led her to writing books for children and adolescents, with her first co-authored book on astronomy being published in 1935, staying in print for 60 years. In 1939, she left the Museum for a position as sales and promotion manager at University of Minnesota Press, publishing a bestselling biography of the Mayo brothers.

Bennett returned to New York in 1941, where she worked with Georges Duplaix to develop the Little Golden Books. Under Duplaix, Bennett became the editor of the Golden Books franchise, producing books by such authors and illustrators as Margaret Wise Brown, Clement Hurd, Edith Thacher Hurd, and Garth Williams. Bennett authored several Golden Books, as well as introducing some of the first recorded books for children with Little Golden Records in 1948. She was also involved with the production of the Golden Nature Guides and regional guides in 1949.

=== Leaving publishing ===
After leaving Simon & Schuster in 1954, Bennett enrolled in a Foreign Service Institute Course on the Middle East at the American University of Beirut and then in V. Gordon Childe's archaeology courses at UCL Institute of Archaeology. Bennett then moved to University of California, Berkeley to become senior anthropologist at the Lowie Museum of Anthropology, where she managed collections.

In the 1960s, Bennett worked with the Berkeley Unified School District to create an interdisciplinary multimedia course called Educational Programming of Cultural Heritage (EPOCH), which lasted until 1969.

== Retirement ==
After the end of EPOCH, Bennett and her companion, child psychologist Rosamund Gardner, moved to Taos, New Mexico where they built an adobe home. They associated with artists and painters like Erik Bauersfeld, Dorothy Brett, and others. Bennett died in Taos in 1999.

== Selected publications ==
- Handbook of the Heavens, Sponsored by the American Museum of Natural History with Hubert Jay Bernhard (McGraw-Hill 1935)
- "A Planetarium for New York."(November, 1935) The Scientific Monthly 41 (5): 474–477
- The Book of the Hayden Planetarium, the American Museum of Natural History (The Museum, 1935)
- Sold to the Ladies! Or, the Incredible But True Adventures of Three Girls on a Barge (Cadmus Books, 1940)
- The Golden Almanac (Simon & Schuster, 1944)
- The Golden Encyclopedia (Simon & Schuster, 1946)
