= Singal =

Singal is a surname. Notable people with the surname include:

- George Z. Singal (born 1945), American jurist
- Jesse Singal (born 1983), American journalist

== See also ==
- Singal-dong, province of South Korea
- Singal Junction
- Singal station
