= John Langstaff =

American singer and educator (1920–2005)

- Born: John Meredith Langstaff; December 24, 1920
- Died: December 13, 2005 (aged 84)
- Instrument: Voice (baritone)

John Meredith Langstaff (December 24, 1920 – December 13, 2005), a concert baritone, and early music revivalist was the founder of the tradition of the Christmas Revels, as well as a respected musician and educator. He attended the Curtis Institute of Music as well as Juilliard.

== Career ==
Langstaff's lifelong project, the Christmas Revels, began in 1957 with a show in New York. In 1971 began the longest-running Revels, at Cambridge, Massachusetts. The Revels, an eclectic mix of medieval and modern music and dance (primarily English in basis), involves the audience and the community in a continuation of pagan and older Christian traditions. Revels shows, now spread over the USA and the world, draw on local talent. Morris dancing, mummers, bagpipers and large choruses of men, women and children celebrate the turning of the Winter Solstice in a cheerful fashion.

Throughout his adult life, Langstaff was a dedicated music educator. In 1955 he became the music director at The Potomac School in Washington, DC, and later taught at Shady Hill School in Cambridge, Massachusetts. He wrote twenty-five books, including the Caldecott Medal-winning Frog Went A-Courtin'. He hosted the BBC-TV Schools programme Making Music for five years, and produced a series of videos called Making Music with John Langstaff for parents and teachers. He also published songbooks, teacher's guides, and production guides for the Revels.

In 1964, he was a soloist with the Naumburg Orchestral Concerts, in the Naumburg Bandshell, Central Park, in the summer series.

In the later 1970s and early 1980s, Jack, as he was known by some, was associated with the Young Audiences organization in the United States, which creates and presents performance arts in educational settings. Langstaff was Executive Director of Young Audiences of Massachusetts, and collaborated with many cultural, educational, health and community organizations in the Greater Boston area and New England.

Langstaff's recording career was varied and long. Beginning with English traditional music in the 1950s, he continued with the founding of Revels Records, recording primarily children's and traditional music. Several of his early recordings were made in London with noted producer George Martin.

== Personal life ==
Langstaff was the son of B. Meredith Langstaff. His grandmother, Sarah Josephine Meredith Langstaff, was the founder of the Daughters of the British Empire.

In 1943 Langstaff married Diane Hamilton. They divorced in 1947. He was later married to Nancy Woodbridge, a pianist.

Langstaff died on December 13, 2005, of a stroke.

On May 17, 2006 David Nath's documentary film To Drive The Dark Away, which chronicles Langstaff's life and work with the Christmas Revels, had its world premiere in Arlington, Massachusetts.

== See also ==
- Revels
