= Janette Sebring Lowrey =

American children's writer (1892-1986)

- Born: Janette Sebring; March 2, 1892; Orange, Texas, U.S.
- Died: March 17, 1986 (aged 94); San Antonio, Texas
- Occupation: Author
- Spouse: Fred V. Lowrey
- Writing career
- Years active: 1930s-1970s
- Genres: Children, young adults
- Notable work: The Poky Little Puppy

Janette Sebring Lowrey (March 2, 1892 – March 17, 1986) was an American children's writer, best known for the book The Poky Little Puppy. As of 2001, The Poky Little Puppy was the single all-time best-selling hardcover children's book in the U.S., having sold nearly 15 million copies. While the book has outsold many other famous books such as Dr. Seuss' Green Eggs and Ham, Lowrey herself (who also wrote stories about children in her home state of Texas) remained in relative obscurity until her death.

== Life ==
Lowrey was born in Orange, Texas. She wrote dozens of books for children and young adults from the 1930s to the 1970s. The Poky Little Puppy remains her best known, selling over 15 million copies worldwide. Another well-known work of hers was Margaret, a historical fiction young adult novel, which was published in 1950. It was adapted into Walt Disney Presents: Annette, a TV serial that aired on The Mickey Mouse Club in 1958.

Despite her success as an author, Lowrey largely remained out of the public limelight.

== Works ==
- Rings on Her Fingers (Harper & Bros., 1941)
- Janette Sebring Lowrey (1942). The Poky Little Puppy. Illustrated by Gustaf Tenggren. Western Publishing Co. ISBN 978-0-307-30099-7.; Random House Digital, Inc., 2011, ISBN 978-0-375-86129-1
- In the Morning of the World: Some of the Greek Myths (Harper, 1944)
- Margaret (Harper & Row, 1950)
