= Eloise Wilkin =

American illustrator (1904–1987)

- Born: Eloise Margaret Burns; March 30, 1904; Rochester, New York, US
- Died: October 4, 1987 (aged 83); Brighton, New York, US
- Resting place: Holy Sepulchre Cemetery, Rochester, New York, US
- Education: Rochester Athenaeum and Mechanics Institute
- Known for: illustrator of Little Golden Books
- Spouse: Sidney Wilkin

Eloise Margaret Wilkin (née Burns; March 30, 1904 – October 4, 1987), was an American illustrator. She was best known as an illustrator of Little Golden Books. Many of the picture books she illustrated have become classics of American children's literature. Jane Werner Watson, who edited and wrote hundreds of Golden Books, called Eloise Wilkin "the soul of Little Golden Books", and Wilkin's books remain highly collectible. Her watercolor and colored pencil illustrations are known for their glowing depiction of babies, toddlers, and their parents in idyllic rural and domestic settings.

== Early life ==
Wilkin was born on March 30, 1904, in Rochester, New York, the third of four children. At age 2, Eloise moved with her family to New York City, but spent every summer with her siblings at a relative's home in western New York State. Memories forged there of family togetherness and the outdoors would influence her famous illustrations of nature, children, and family life. Wilkin won a drawing contest for New York schoolchildren at age 11 and graduated from the Rochester Athenaeum and Mechanics Institute, now the Rochester Institute of Technology, in 1923.

== Career ==
Soon after college graduation, Wilkin and her friend Joan Esley opened an art studio in Rochester, New York, but struggling to find work, the pair moved to New York City, where Century Company gave Wilkin her first book to illustrate, The Shining Hours. Many of her early illustrations were for school books. Early in her career, she illustrated paper dolls for Samuel Gabriel & Sons, Playtime House and Jaymar. Wilkin often illustrated the titles of her sister, children's author Esther Burns Wilkin, who married Eloise's brother-in-law. The first of the Wilkins' collaborations was Mrs. Peregrine and the Yak, published by the Henry Holt Company.

=== Golden Books Illustrator ===
In 1944, Wilkin signed an exclusive contract with original Little Golden Books publisher Simon & Schuster requiring her to illustrate three books each year. She often used her children and grandchildren and their friends as models for her illustrations. A devout Christian, Wilkin frequently illustrated religious picture books including several compilations of prayers for children.

Wilkins occasionally revised her illustrated works to reflect changing cultural norms. The New Baby, first published in 1948, depicted an expectant mother just days away from birth with no visible signs of pregnancy. For the 1975 reprinting, Wilkin decided to more realistically portray the mother and her pregnant form. The 1954 cover of "The New Baby" shows an infant sleeping on her tummy, which Wilkins changed for the 1975 edition after increasing societal awareness of sudden infant death syndrome. The original 1956 edition of My Little Golden Book about God featured Caucasian children only, and Wilkin re-illustrated several pages to include children of other races in 1974.

Many of Wilkin's illustrations for Golden Books appeared on calendars, puzzles, and record sleeves of Little Golden Records, and were also found on china plates, Hallmark Cards, and in Child's Life, Story Parade, and Golden magazines. Wilkin's Golden Books have been published in French, Hebrew, Portuguese, Spanish and Swedish.

=== Doll Designer ===
In 1960, Vogue Dolls, Inc. launched the first doll designed by Eloise Wilkin. "Baby Dear" came in 12 and 18 inch-sizes and sold for $6 and $12 respectively. Nikita Khrushchev saw the doll in the window of FAO Schwarz during his 1960 visit to New York City and purchased 13 to take back to the Soviet Union. In all, Eloise designed eight dolls for Vogue and Madame Alexander. Baby Dear and So Big, both written by Esther Wilkin and illustrated by Eloise Wilkin, feature the Eloise Wilkin dolls.

== Family ==
Wilkin married Sidney Wilkin on August 18, 1930. She took a decade off from illustrating in order to raise her four children: Ann Wilkin Murphy, Sidney, editor Deborah Wilkin Springett, and Jeremy.

== Death ==
Eloise Wilkin died of cancer in Brighton, New York, on October 4, 1987, at the age of 83. She is buried in Holy Sepulchre Cemetery in Rochester, New York.

== Books ==
Among the 47 Golden Book titles illustrated by Wilkin are:

- Good Little Bad Little Girl
- My Little Golden Book About God
- Poems to Read to the Very Young
- The Christmas Story
- Evening Prayer
- A Giant Little Golden Book Of Birds
- Wonders of Nature
- The Wonders of the Seasons
- We Like Kindergarten
- Prayers for Children
- The Goodnight Book
- Baby Dear
- Baby Listens
- Baby Looks
- Baby's Mother Goose
- Baby's Christmas
- The Christmas ABC
- Babies
- This World of Ours
- We Help Daddy
- We Help Mommy
- The Visit
- Play With Me
- Baby's Birthday
- The Treasury of Prayers From Around the World
- So Big
- A Baby is Born
- Hansel and Gretel
- The Tune Is In the Tree
- The Boy With a Drum
- Busy Timmy
- Guess Who Lives Here
- Where Did the Baby Go?
- The Little Book
- A Child's Garden of Verses
- My Dolly and Me
- Eloise Wilkin's Book of Poems.
