= Corinne Malvern =

American actress (1901–1956)

- Born: December 13, 1901; Accomack County, Virginia
- Died: November 9, 1956 (aged 54); Weston, Connecticut
- Known for: Illustration
- Notable work: Little Golden Books

Corinne Malvern (December 13, 1901 – November 9, 1956) was an American commercial artist, active as a fashion advertising artist and illustrator of children's books between the early 1930s and her death in 1956. She painted magazine covers and worked as Art Editor of Ladies' Home Journal magazine. She is best known for her illustrations in the Little Golden Books series, including Heidi, Frosty the Snow Man (also known, incorrectly, as Frosty the Snowman), The Night Before Christmas, Doctor Dan the Bandage Man, and Nurse Nancy. She illustrated 32 books, 17 for Little Golden Books. She also wrote and illustrated at least one children's book (How Big, later republished as How Big Are You, Little Golden Books, 1949). Her last book, Five Pennies To Spend, was published in 1955.

== Biography ==
Malvern was born in Accomack County, Virginia, and raised in Newark, New Jersey. Her mother, Cora Malvern, worked as wardrobe mistress for theater companies, and Corinne and her older sister Gladys Malvern (born July 17, 1903, or 1897) worked as child actresses in plays vaudeville, and operas. She claimed to have been born in 1906, but the 1920 United States Census, photographs of her on stage in 1907 (portraying a character supposed to be three years old), a 1907 New York Evening Telegram article and ships' passenger records, make it clear she was born in 1901.

Malvern performed in the Henry W. Savage New English Grand Opera Company in the American premiere of Puccini's opera Madama Butterfly in the role of the child "Dolore" ("Sorrow," or "Trouble" in English), Butterfly's son, in front of an audience that included the Viscount Aoki, Japanese Ambassador to the United States, and John Luther Long, author of the novella on which the opera was based on October 15, 1906 (the Metropolitan Opera premiere followed, in February of the following year), and subsequently toured with the production across the United States and Canada.

By 1910 the two sisters were working regularly in traveling vaudeville productions, as well as in the burgeoning New York movie industry, Gladys as an ingenue and Corinne as "fairies, babies, witches, and other funny little people." In 1915 Corinne appeared in a motion picture, The Luring Lights, as the character Rose Malleen.

After being injured in a railroad accident during a vaudeville tour, probably when she was in her early teens, she retired from her stage career and was sent to a boarding school while her mother and sister continued their itinerant careers. Encouraged by her family, she studied for four years at the Art Students League of New York In 1930 Corinne (now an advertising illustrator for a milliner and single), Gladys (now a sales manager for a department store and divorced), and their mother (listed in the census as a widow, employed as a stage costumer) were living together in Los Angeles, where Corinne worked as a fashion illustrator and continued her art studies as a pupil of Theodore Lukits. By 1932, she was working as a commercial artist and establishing her reputation as an illustrator. Working primarily in tempera, pencil, pastel, and watercolor, she created magazine covers and fashion illustrations, and exhibited her work, mostly portraits and figure studies, in galleries. She collaborated with her sister, Gladys, who was becoming established as a professional writer, and the two of them launched their careers in the field of children's books.

Corinne Malvern never married. She moved to New York sometime between 1934 and 1936 with Cora and Gladys, and continued to collaborate professionally with Gladys. They published Land of Surprise in 1938, Brownie, the Little Bear Who Liked People in 1939, and The Land of Look And See in 1940 with McLoughlin Bros., Inc. Their 1943 book Valiant Minstrel, a biography of the Scottish entertainer Sir Harry Lauder, won the $1250 Julia Ellsworth Ford Prize. Corinne illustrated Nursery Songs, one of the initial offering of twelve Little Golden Books, issued in 1942 (but not the cover painting, which was by Louise Alston). She worked as Art Editor for the Ladies Home Journal, and was a prolific and influential advertising illustrator who helped create the iconic 'fifties "look." She and Gladys shared a studio overlooking the Hudson River. They were living together at Slumber Corners in Weston, Connecticut when Corinne's health failed. She moved to a convalescent home in Weston, where she died on November 9, 1956, after a long illness.
