= Tibor Gergely =

Hungarian-American artist

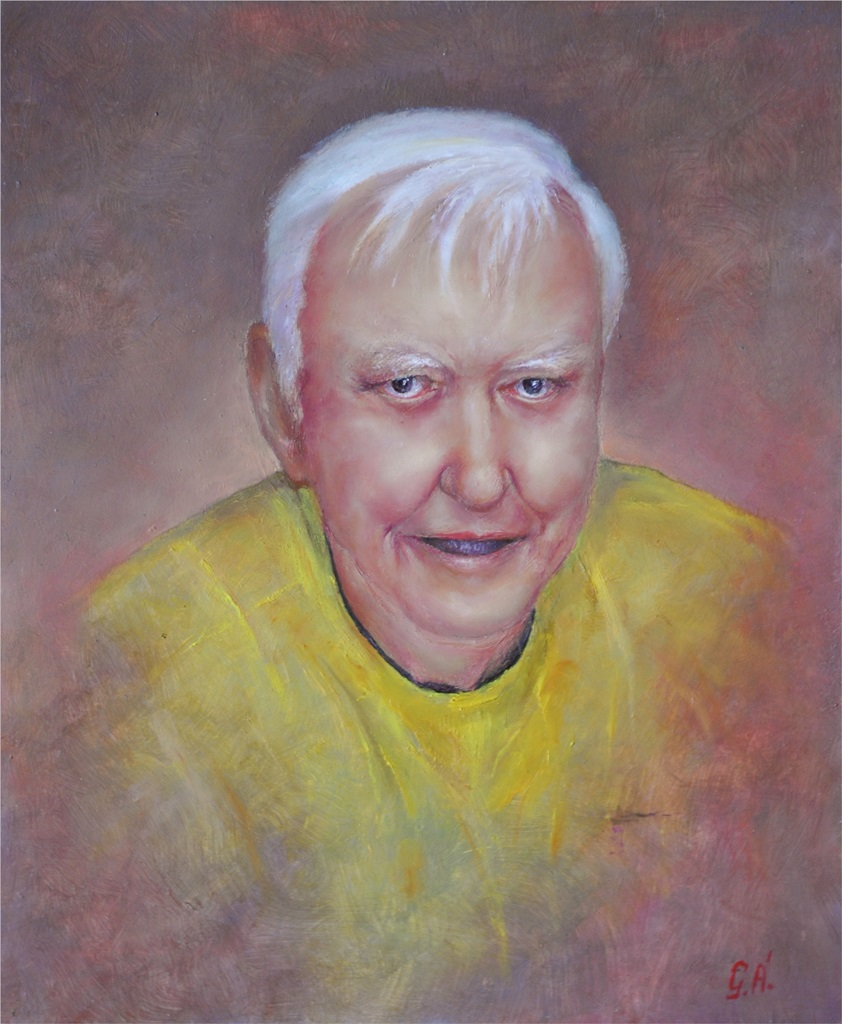
- Born: Tibor Grünstein; August 3, 1900; Budapest, Kingdom of Hungary
- Died: January 13, 1978 (aged 77); New York City, New York, U.S.
- Occupation: Illustrator
- Spouse: Anna Lesznai

Tibor Gergely (August 3, 1900 – January 13, 1978) was a Hungarian-American artist best known for his illustration of popular children's picture books. His work was part of the painting event in the art competition at the 1928 Summer Olympics.

== Biography ==
Gergely was born Tibor Grünstein in Budapest in 1900 into a middle-class Jewish family. With the collapse of the Hungarian Soviet Republic in 1919, he fled Hungary for Vienna, where his social circle included other Jewish exiles such as the Hungarian Red Army commander Jenő Landler and the communist politician József Révai. He studied art briefly in Vienna and drew newspaper caricatures there before immigrating to the United States in 1939, where he settled in New York City.

== Career ==
Gergely's early works were influenced by Paul Cézanne and Cubism. He created oil paintings of landscapes and portraits, often with a somber tone.

Largely a self-taught artist, he also contributed several covers of The New Yorker, mostly during the 1940s. Among the most popular children's books Gergely illustrated are The Happy Man and His Dump Truck, Busy Day Busy People, The Magic Bus (by Maurice Dolbier), The Little Red Caboose, The Fire Engine Book, Tootle, Five Little Firemen, Five Hundred Animals from A to Z, and Scuffy the Tugboat. Many of his better known books were published by Little Golden Books. His best work is collected in The Great Big Book of Bedtime Stories. He became a U.S. citizen in 1948.

== Death ==
Gergely died in 1978, in New York.

As of 2001, Tootle was the all-time third best-selling hardcover children's book in English, and Scuffy the Tugboat was the eighth all-time bestseller.
