= New York Review Books =

American publishing house

- Parent company: The New York Review of Books
- Founded: 1999
- Founder: Edwin Frank
- Country of origin: United States
- Headquarters location: New York City
- Distribution: Penguin Random House Publisher Services
- Publication types: Books
- Official website: nyrb.com

New York Review Books (NYRB) is the publishing division of The New York Review of Books. Its imprints are New York Review Books Classics, New York Review Books Collections, The New York Review Children's Collection, New York Review Comics, New York Review Books Poets, and NYRB Lit.

== Description ==
The division was started in the fall of 1999. It grew out of another enterprise called the Reader's Catalog (subtitle: "The 40,000 best books in print"), which sold books through a catalog. Founder Edwin Frank and his managing editor discovered that many of the books they wanted were out of print, so they decided to republish titles in fiction and non-fiction.

=== Series and collections ===
NYRB Classics is a series of fiction and non-fiction works for all ages and from around the world. Since its first volume, a 1999 reissue of Richard Hughes's 1929 novel A High Wind in Jamaica, NYRB Classics has published hundreds of titles. Occasionally, it has published translations of works previously unavailable in English by writers including Euripides, Dante, Balzac and Chekhov. It also publishes fiction by more contemporary writers such as Vasily Grossman, Mavis Gallant, Upamanyu Chatterjee, Georges Simenon, Kenneth Fearing, and J. R. Ackerley. Most of the books include an introduction by a writer or literary critic. Edwin Frank is the editor of the Classics imprint. It has been called "a marvellous literary imprint ... that has put hundreds of wonderful books back on our shelves."

NYRB Collections is a series of books that collect essays by frequent contributors to The New York Review of Books. With works by writers such as Larry McMurtry, Frank Rich, Mary McCarthy, Freeman Dyson and others, NYRB Collections present treatments of major intellectual, political, scientific, and artistic developments and debates. The NYRB Lit series was established in July 2012 with the specific goal of publishing contemporary works of noteworthy fiction and non-fiction from around the world. It is an e-book-only series that strives to publish titles considered too low in profitability for traditional publishers. The first-announced titles were The Water Theatre by Lindsay Clarke (September 2012); Beirut, I Love You by Zena El Khalil (October 2012); 1948 by Yoram Kaniuk (November 2012); Ravan and Eddie by Kiran Nagarkar (December 2012), and On the Edge by Markus Werner (January 2013).

The New York Review Children's Collection was founded in 2003 to reintroduce children's books that have fallen out of print, or simply out of mainstream attention. The series includes more than 30 titles, ranging from picture books to young adult novels. NYRB Kids was founded in 2015; titles are "drawn from The New York Review Children's Collection and reissued as stylish paperback editions designed to be especially attractive to young readers".

Other collections and series include New York Review Comics, NYRB Poets, and Calligrams, a "series of writings from and on China".
