= Little Golden Books =

Children's book series

- A typical example of the Little Golden Books logo.
- The Poky Little Puppy; Tootle; Scuffy the Tugboat; The Little Red Hen; many others
- Author: Margaret Wise Brown; Edith Thacher Hurd; Janette Sebring Lowrey; Phyllis Fraser; many others
- Illustrator: Corinne Malvern; Tibor Gergely; Gustaf Tenggren; Feodor Rojankovsky; Richard Scarry; Eloise Wilkin; Garth Williams; many others
- Country: United States
- Language: English
- Discipline: nature; science; Bible stories; nursery rhyme; fairy tales; toys; comics; cartoons; movies; television
- Publisher: Simon & Schuster (1942–1958); Western Publishing (1942–2001); Golden Press (1958–2001); Random House (2001–present); Penguin Random House (2013–present)
- Published: 1942–present
- Media type: hardcover
- Website: www.penguinrandomhouse.com/series/LGB/little-golden-book

The Little Golden Books is an American series of children's books, published since 1942. The Poky Little Puppy, the eighth release in the series, is the top-selling children's book of all time in the United States. Many other Little Golden Books have become bestsellers, including Tootle, Scuffy the Tugboat, The Little Red Hen, and Doctor Dan the Bandage Man.

Several of its illustrators later became influential in the children's book industry, including Corinne Malvern, Tibor Gergely, Gustaf Tenggren, Feodor Rojankovsky, Richard Scarry, Eloise Wilkin, and Garth Williams. Many books in the Little Golden Books series deal with nature, science, Bible stories, nursery rhymes, and fairy tales. Christmas titles are published every year.

Some Little Golden Books and related products have featured popular characters from other media, such as Nickelodeon, Cartoon Network, Disney, Looney Tunes, The Muppets, Sesame Street, Woody Woodpecker, Super Mario, Sonic the Hedgehog, Barbie, Power Rangers, Star Trek, Star Wars, Doctor Who, Thomas the Tank Engine, and others. Film, television, and movie properties have been particularly popular source material. Hopalong Cassidy, Cheyenne, Lassie, Rin Tin Tin, Captain Kangaroo, Mister Rogers, and Donny and Marie Osmond have also appeared in Little Golden Books. The line has also published occasional biographies; examples include The Beatles, Bee Gees, Taylor Swift, Betty White, Dolly Parton and Ruth Bader Ginsburg.

The series started with publishing firm Simon & Schuster; Western Printing and Lithographing Company in Racine, Wisconsin was Simon & Schuster's partner in the Little Golden Books venture, with Western handling print operations. Ownership and control of the series have changed several times since; today, Penguin Random House is its current publisher.

Despite changes in detail, the Little Golden Books maintain a distinctive appearance. A copy of The Poky Little Puppy bought today is essentially the same as one printed in 1942. Both are readily recognizable as Little Golden Books. At the time of the series' golden anniversary in 1992, Golden Books claimed that a billion and a half Little Golden Books had been sold. Although the Little Golden Books have remained the backbone of the product line, the enterprise that produced them has created a variety of children's books in various forms of media, including records, tapes, videos, and toys and games. Some titles have appeared in several different formats (including "A Golden Book").

== History ==
Little Red Hen cover

Georges Duplaix, head of Artists and Writers Guild Inc. (a division of Western Publishing), came up with an idea for a new imprint as he was developing books for children. Meanwhile, a shared printing plant led Western and Simon & Schuster to develop a close relationship. In 1938, Western and Simon & Schuster released their first joint creation, A Children’s History.

Duplaix had the idea to produce a colorful children's book that was more durable and affordable than those being published at that time, which often sold for US$2 to $3 (approximately $50 to $70 now). With the help of his fellow Guild colleague Lucile Olge, Duplaix contacted Albert Leventhal and Leon Shimkin with his idea (Albert and Leon worked for Simon & Schuster, and Albert served as the company's vice president and sales manager).

The team agreed to launch twelve titles simultaneously under the banner of the Little Golden Books Series. Each book would consist of 42 pages, with 28 pages printed in two colors and 14 pages in four colors. The books would be bound with staples. Initially considering a price of 50 cents per book, there was hesitation due to existing competition in that price range. By increasing the print run to 50,000 copies per title instead of 25,000, they calculated that the books could be sold affordably at 25 cents each (equivalent to approximately $5 today).

Mary Reed, Ph.D., a professor at the Teachers College, Columbia University, served as initial editor of the series.

The first 12 titles were printed in September 1942 and released to stores in October:

1. Three Little Kittens, by Marie Simchow Stern
2. Bedtime Stories, illus. Gustaf Tenggren
3. Mother Goose, by Phyllis Fraser, illus. Gertrude E. Espenscheid
4. Prayers for Children, by Rachel Taft Dixon
5. The Little Red Hen, illus. Rudolf Freund
6. Nursery Songs, by Leah Gale, illus. Corinne Malvern
7. The Alphabet from A to Z, by Leah Gale, illus. Vivienne Blake and Richard Peck
8. The Poky Little Puppy, by Janette Sebring Lowrey, illus. Gustaf Tenggren
9. The Golden Book of Fairy Tales, by Winfield Scott Hoskins
10. Baby's Book of Objects
11. The Animals of Farmer Jones, by Leah Gale, illus. Rudolf Freund
12. This Little Piggy and Other Counting Rhymes, by Phyllis Cerf Wagner, illus. Roberta Harris Pfafflin Petty

Three editions totaling 1.5 million books sold out within five months of publication in 1942.

Simon & Schuster editor Dorothy A. Bennett also worked with Duplaix on the Little Golden Books. Bennett became the editor of the franchise, producing books by such authors and illustrators as Margaret Wise Brown, Clement Hurd, Edith Thacher Hurd, and Garth Williams. Bennett authored several Golden Books, and introduced some of the first recorded books for children with Little Golden Records in 1948.

The series underwent an expansion when Lucy Sprague Mitchell (educator and founder of Bank Street Nursery School now Bank Street College of Education) joined. A strong supporter of realistic children's literature, Mitchell created the Bank Street Writer's Laboratory. Works coming from this institution became the new basis for the Little Golden Book series, with characters and situations often inspired by the very locale of the Bank School.

As historian Leonard S. Marcus writes:

Mitchell had been in discussions with Georges Duplaix and Lucille Ogle as early as 1943 about the possibility of a special series of Little Golden Books written by members of Bank Street Writer’s Laboratory. Wartime shortages had delayed the launch of the series until 1946. The first two titles appeared that year: Lucy Sprague Mitchell's The New House in the Forest, illustrated by Eloise Wilkins, and The Taxi That Hurried, coauthored by Irma Simonton Black and Jessie Stanton, with illustrations by Tibor Gergely.

In 1958, Simon & Schuster sold its interest in Little Golden Books to Western Publishing. The price of Little Golden Books rose to 29¢ in 1962.

Western introduced a line of Big Little Golden Books for slightly older children aged five and up. Some titles from this series range from brand new stories (such as The House That Had Enough) to reprints (such as The Monster at the End of This Book).

In the 1980s, Golden Books introduced Golden Melody Books. Titles from this series included a long-lasting electronic chip that played music when readers open those books. Songs featured in this series range from popular children's songs such as Twinkle, Twinkle Little Star, to songs from children's TV and family movies including People in Your Neighborhood from Sesame Street and Heigh-Ho from Disney's Snow White and the Seven Dwarfs.

In the year 2000, Encore Software produced a series of "Little Golden Books" titles for CD ROM, including The Poky Little Puppy, Mother Goose, Jack and the Beanstalk, The Velveteen Rabbit, Tootle, and The Saggy Baggy Elephant. These six individual titles were some of the first major software releases to be produced entirely in Macromedia Flash.

In 2001, Random House acquired Little Golden Books for about $85 million, after their parent company filed for bankruptcy twice in two years. At that point, nearly 15 million copies of The Poky Little Puppy had been sold, including copies in various languages.

In 2015, with the release of Little Golden Book adaptations of the first six installments of the Star Wars saga on August 25, the Little Golden Book adaptation of Star Wars: Episode III – Revenge of the Sith became the first-ever Little Golden Book in history to come from a film that was rated PG-13 by the MPAA. Months later, on April 12, 2016, a Little Golden Book adaptation of Star Wars: The Force Awakens, the next film in the saga, also rated PG-13, was released. This release opened the door for further Little Golden Books that drew upon PG-13 rated licensed film properties; some adaptations in this criterion include the 2016 reboot of Ghostbusters, characters and storylines from the Marvel Cinematic Universe, and Jurassic Park.

In 2023, a biography about singer-songwriter Taylor Swift became the fastest-selling in the series' history, selling one million copies in seven months.

== Writers and illustrators ==
Many popular authors and illustrators have worked on Little Golden Books and related products, including:

- Aurelius Battaglia
- Sheilah Beckett
- Brian Biggs
- Mary Blair
- Ann Braybooks
- Margaret Wise Brown
- Kathleen N. Daly
- Sue Fliess
- Tibor Gergely
- Florence Johnson
- Elizabeth Orton Jones
- Phyllis Krasilovsky
- Lucy Sprague Mitchell
- Corinne Malvern
- Jim McDermott
- Ann McGovern
- Jean Miller
- Barbra Mills
- Alice Provensen and Martin Provensen
- Seymour Reit
- Feodor Stepanovich Rojankovsky
- Patricia and Richard Scarry
- Bob Staake
- Cyndy Szekeres
- Gustaf Tenggren
- Charles Spain Verral
- Jan Wahl
- Jane Werner Watson
- Eloise Wilkin
- Garth Williams
- Herbert Zim

== In popular culture ==
=== Contemporary art ===
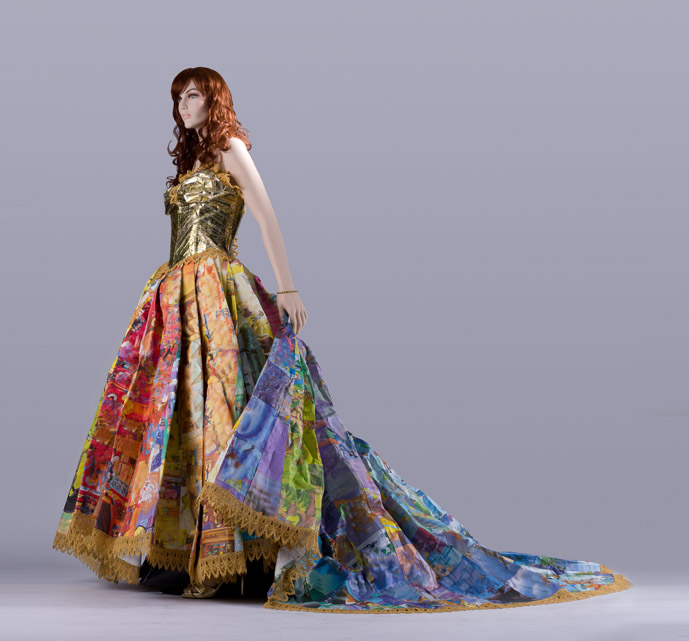
The Golden Book Gown

In 2010, Ryan Jude Novelline revealed the "Golden Book Gown", a "one-of-a-kind fairytale-inspired gown almost entirely from Golden Books...[featuring] a 22,000-square-inch page-turning skirt and a form-fitting bodice made from the spines".

=== Homages ===
In 2015, during the Diamond celebration at Disneyland, the Disney Imagineers brought the 1955 Little Golden Book story Little Man of Disneyland to life by featuring a recreation of Patrick Begorra's home in a tree trunk somewhere in Adventureland at the park for visitors to find.

== See also ==
- Everything I Need to Know I Learned from a Little Golden Book
- Golden Book Encyclopedia
- Little Golden Book Land
- Poky and Friends
