= The Poky Little Puppy =

1942 book by Janette Sebring Lowrey

- Author: Janette Sebring Lowrey
- Illustrator: Gustaf Tenggren
- Language: English
- Series: Little Golden Books
- Genre: Children's books
- Publisher: Golden Books
- Publication date: June 28, 1942
- Publication place: United States
- Pages: 24
- ISBN: 978-0307021342

The Poky Little Puppy is a children's book written by Janette Sebring Lowrey and illustrated by Gustaf Tenggren. It was first published in 1942 as one of the first twelve books in the Simon & Schuster series Little Golden Books. The copyright was renewed in October 1969.

The Poky Little Puppy is a story about five puppies of undetermined breed. As of 2001, The Poky Little Puppy was the single all-time best-selling hardcover children's book in the U.S., having sold nearly 15 million copies. While the book has outsold many other famous books such as Dr. Seuss' Green Eggs and Ham, Lowrey herself remained in relative obscurity until her death.

== Synopsis ==
The Poky Little Puppy lags behind to explore while his siblings sneak out to play. When his siblings are caught for digging holes under the fence, the puppy escapes punishment by being away. He (not knowing he is going to be punished) secretly avoids punishment, eats the rice pudding, and crawls into bed happy as a lark. (However, the other puppies were denied. And they did not notice the Poky Little Puppy.)

The next day, someone filled the hole. Then a sign was made. The sign said: "DON'T EVER DIG HOLES UNDER THIS FENCE!". But the puppies dug a hole under the fence and went for a walk in the wide, wide, world.

This pattern then repeats itself, only with chocolate custard for dessert instead of rice pudding. But their mother was greatly displeased. She (again) punishes the Poky Little Puppy's siblings. (That is, as she says, "So you are the little puppies who are going to dig holes under fences! No chocolate custard tonight!".) Once again, the Poky Little Puppy avoids punishment while everyone else is asleep. He eats up the chocolate custard withheld because of the fence digging incident. Then he (again, not knowing he is going to be punished) secretly avoids punishment, eats the chocolate custard too, and again crawls into bed happy as a lark. (Again, the other puppies were denied. And they—again—did not notice the Poky Little Puppy.)

The next day, someone filled the hole. Then a sign was made. The sign said: "DON'T EVER, EVER DIG HOLES UNDER THIS FENCE!". But in the spite of that, the puppies dug a hole under the fence and went for a walk in the wide, wide, world.

At the end of the book does fate catch up with the Poky Little Puppy. The mother (the third time) almost punishes the Poky Little Puppy's siblings. (That is, as she says to them, "So you are the little puppies who dug a hole under that fence again! No strawberry shortcake for supper tonight!".) When the puppies are sent to bed without dessert a third time (this time being strawberry shortcake), they wait until they think their mother is sleeping. Then they sneak out of bed, make up for their mistake, and fill in the hole they had dug under the fence. The mother sees them doing this, rewards them to have strawberry shortcake, and tells them to come have strawberry shortcake. The Poky Little Puppy not only arrives too late to get any strawberry shortcake, but is forced to squeeze between the fence boards since the hole has been filled in. Then when he sees his four brothers and sisters licking the last crumbs from their saucers (last crumbs from the shortcake), his mother notes her sympathy about Poky's behavior. She (in comfort) says to him, "Dear me...! What a pity, you are so poky! Now the strawberry shortcake is all gone!". The book concludes with Poky Little Puppy having to go to bed without a single bite from the shortcake, gets a taste of his own medicine, and (since he is forced to go to bed while he watches his siblings eat strawberry shortcake) feels "very sorry for himself". But the incident makes him understand how his brothers and sisters must have felt (that is, from both the "rice pudding" and "chocolate custard" incidents).

On the last page, the next day there is a sign outside. That is, to which the puppies read (including the Poky Little Puppy). Reading it, the sign says: "NO DESSERTS EVER...! ...UNLESS PUPPIES NEVER DIG HOLES UNDER THIS FENCE AGAIN!".

== Adaptations ==
A Christmas television special, The Poky Little Puppy's First Christmas, aired on the Showtime network on December 13, 1992.

== See also ==
- Poky and Friends
