= W. R. Scott (publisher) =

Children's literature publisher

- Status: Acquired by Addison-Wesley, c. 1972
- Founded: 1938
- Founder: William Rufus Scott
- Country of origin: United States
- Headquarters location: New York City
- Key people: Ethel McCullough Scott, John C. McCullough, Margaret Wise Brown
- Publication types: Children's books
- Imprints: Young Scott Books

W. R. Scott was a children's literature publisher based in New York City that specialized in visually striking books with a contemporary educational philosophy. W. R. Scott's first editor was Margaret Wise Brown; the company also published a number of her books.

== History ==
The company was founded in 1938 by William Rufus Scott (1911–1997), who was assisted by his wife Ethel McCullough Scott, and her brother, John C. McCullough.

With small children of their own, the Scotts had connections to the Bureau of Educational Experiments (later known as the Bank Street College of Education), which was promoting a new approach to children's education and literature, emphasizing the real world and the "here and now". In keeping with the Bank Street philosophy, W. R. Scott's initial list included art books for the very young, poetry, essays, and reissues.

The Scotts' link to Bank Street led them to Margaret Wise Brown, who worked at the Bank Street Experimental School and had just published her first children's book. Brown was hired as the company's first editor, and one of her first projects was to recruit contemporary authors to write children's books for the company. Ernest Hemingway and John Steinbeck neglected to respond, but Brown's hero Gertrude Stein accepted the offer. Stein's book The World is Round, was illustrated by Clement Hurd, who had previously teamed with Brown on W. R. Scott's Bumble Bugs and Elephants, considered "perhaps the first modern board book for babies". Brown and Hurd later teamed on the children's book classics The Runaway Bunny and Goodnight Moon, though they were released by a different publisher.

In addition to publishing a number of her own books, under Brown's editorship W. R. Scott published Edith Thacher Hurd's first book, Hurry Hurry, and Esphyr Slobodkina's classic Caps for Sale.

In the 1960s most of the publisher's titles were released under the Young Scott Books imprint. W. R. Scott was acquired by Addison-Wesley c. 1972. Most of W. R. Scott's titles went out of print, though some were re-issued by HarperCollins and Shoe String Press's imprint Linnet.

== Selected titles ==
=== Margaret Wise Brown ===
- Bumble Bugs and Elephants: a Big and Little Book, illus. Clement Hurd (1938)
- The Little Fireman, illus. Esphyr Slobodkina (1938)
- The Noisy Book, illus. Leonard Weisgard (1939)
- The Country Noisy Book, illus. Leonard Weisgard (1940)
- The Seashore Noisy Book, illus. Leonard Weisgard (1941)
- The Indoor Noisy Book, illus. Leonard Weisgard (1942)
- The Winter Noisy Book, illus. Charles Green Shaw (1947)
- A Child's Good Night Book, illus. Jean Charlot (1944)
- The Little Fisherman, illus. Dahlov Ipcar (1945)
- The Man in the Manhole and the Fix-It Men, illus. Bill Ballantine (1946), written by Brown and Edith Thacher Hurd as "Juniper Sage", OCLC 1698467
- The Little Cowboy, illus. Esphyr Slobodkina (1948)
- The Little Farmer, illus. Esphyr Slobodkina (1948)
- A Child's Good Morning Book, illus. Jean Charlot (1952)
- Willie's Adventures: Three Stories, illus. Crockett Johnson (1954)
- Nibble Nibble: Poems for Children, illus. Leonard Weisgard (1959)

=== Other authors ===
- Daniel Brustlein. One, Two, Three, Going to Sea: an Adding and Subtracting Book (1975)
- Brenner, Barbara. A Snake-Lover's Diary (1970)
- Garelick, May (May McClintock). Where Does the Butterfly Go When It Rains? (1961)
- Hurd, Edith Thacher. Hurry Hurry, illus. Mary Pepperrell Dana (1938)
- Iger, Eve Marie. John Brown: His Soul Goes Marching On (1969)
- Joslin, Sesyle. What Do You Say, Dear?, illus. Maurice Sendak (1958)
- Lear, Edward. The Dong with a Luminous Nose, illus. Edward Gorey (1969)
- Merrill, Jean.
  - Shan's Lucky Knife: A Burmese Folk Tale (1960)
  - The Superlative Horse: A Tale of Ancient China (1961)
  - The Pushcart War (1964)
- Oppenheim, Joanne. Have You Seen Trees?, illus. Irwin Rosenhouse (1967)
- Rees, Ennis. Brer Rabbit and His Tricks (1967)
- Slobodkina, Esphyr. Caps for Sale (1940)
- Stein, Gertrude. The World Is Round, illus. Clement Hurd (1939) OCLC 10175454
