= Thacher Hurd =

American writer

- Born: March 6, 1949 (age 77); Burlington, Vermont, U.S.
- Education: California College of Arts and Crafts
- Occupations: Children's book author; painter
- Notable work: Mama Don't Allow; Art Dog
- Spouse: Olivia
- Children: 2
- Parents: Clement Hurd (father); Edith Thacher Hurd (mother)

John Thacher Hurd (born March 6, 1949) is an American artist and the creator of children's picture books including Mama Don't Allow and Art Dog.

== Biography ==
Thacher Hurd was born in Burlington, Vermont, the son of children's book creators Clement Hurd and Edith Thacher Hurd. He has referred in an interview to the "wonderful aura of creativity" surrounding his father and the Vermont farm that was their home.

Margaret Wise Brown's 1949 My World is dedicated by Brown to the recently born Thacher. (The original dedication "to Hiram Hurd" was altered just before press to read "to John Thacher Hurd when he comes (he's here)".)

After attending the California College of Arts and Crafts, he turned his talents to picture books. His first book was The Old Chair, published in 1978.

In 2001, Hurd re-colored the re-issued edition of My World, by Margaret Wise Brown and Thacher's father Clement Hurd. In 2008, he used his father's artwork from Goodnight Moon to produce Goodnight Moon 123: A Counting Book. Hurd's work, as well as that of his father and mother, was featured at the Stamford Museum & Nature Center in the 2004 exhibition "From Goodnight Moon to Art Dog: The World of Clement, Edith and Thatcher Hurd."

In 2012, Hurd's book Zoom City inspired the name of the American technology company Zoom Video Communications. Zoom City was a New York Times Best Illustrated Book of the Year.

His book together with John Cassidy, Watercolor for the Artistically Undiscovered, originally published in 1992 by Klutz, was reissued in 2017 by The Experiment, a New York publishing house.

Hurd and his wife, Olivia, live in Berkeley, California. They have two sons, Manton and Nicholas. In 1983, Thacher and his wife built their own publishing house, Peaceable Kingdom Press, which prints cards and posters from children’s books.

== Books ==
- The Old Chair (Greenwillow Books, 1978)
- The Quiet Evening (Greenwillow Books, 1978)
- Hobo Dog (Scholastic, 1980)
- Axle the Freeway Cat (Harper & Row, 1981)
- Hobo Dog's Christmas Tree (Scholastic, 1983)
- Mystery on the Docks (Harper & Row, 1983)
- Hobo Dog in the Ghost Town (Scholastic, 1985)
- Mama Don't Allow (Reading Rainbow Books, 1984)
- The Pea Patch Jig (Crown, 1986)
- Blackberry Ramble (Crown, 1989)
- Tomato Soup (Crown, 1992)
- Watercolor for the Artistically Undiscovered (Klutz Press, 1992) — with John Cassidy
- Art Dog (HarperCollins, 1996)
- Santa Mouse and the Ratdeer (HarperCollins, 1998)
- Little Mouse's Birthday Cake (HarperCollins, 1992)
- Zoom City (HarperCollins, 1998)
- Cat's Pajamas (HarperFestival, 2001)
- Moo Cow Kaboom! (HarperCollins, 2003)
- Sleepy Cadillac: A Bedtime Drive (HarperCollins, 2005)
- Bad Frogs (Candlewick Press, 2009)
- The Weaver (Farrar Straus Giroux, 2010) — with Elisa Kleven
- Bongo Fishing (Henry Holt & Co., 2011)
