= Monkey see, monkey do =

Pidgin-style saying

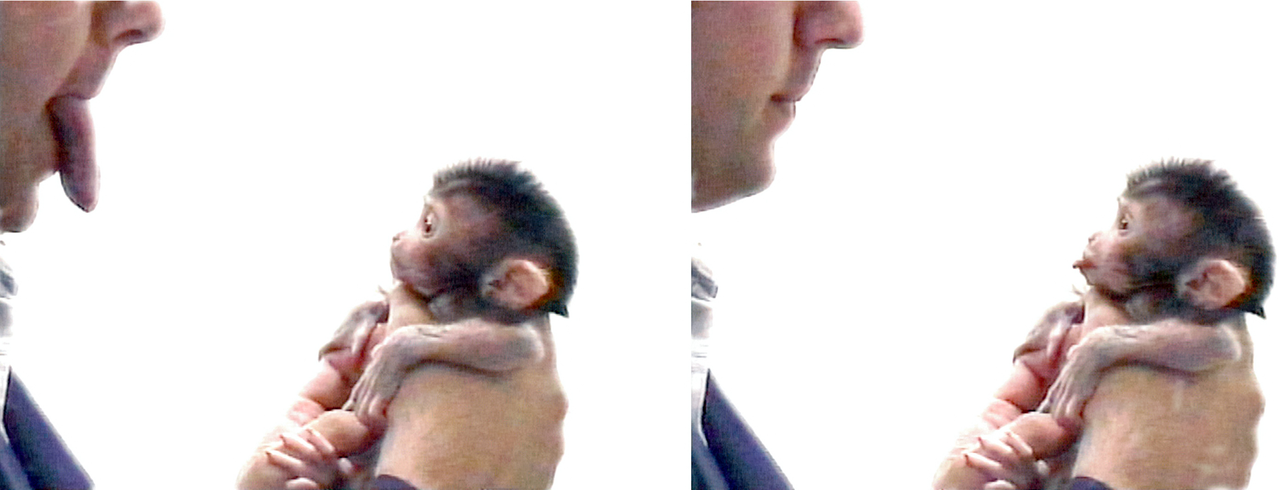
Baby macaque imitating facial expressions

Monkey see, monkey do is a pidgin-style saying that was already called an "old saying" in 1900, and assumed to be an old saying in the 1890s.

== Meaning ==
The saying refers to learning a process without understanding why it works. Another definition implies the act of imitation, usually with limited knowledge or concern for the consequences.

== Versions ==
Versions of the saying that appeared in U.S. commercial advertisements for shoes and other apparel in the 1890s suggested it was popularly established by then, and an article in Sharpe's London Magazine half a century earlier had pointed to the monkeys' habit of mimicry: "Whatever [a monkey] sees men do, he must affect to do the like himself."

== In folklore ==
The West African folk tale of a peddler whose wares are ransacked by monkeys that proceed to imitate his gestures of outrage has been retold by Esphyr Slobodkina in Caps for Sale (A Tale of a Peddler, Some Monkeys and Their Monkey Business) and by Baba Wagué Diakité in The Hatseller and the Monkeys. Diakité notes that versions of his tale also are found in Egypt, Sudan, India, and England, and indeed have existed in Europe since the Middle Ages.

== See also ==
- Cargo cult science
- Echolalia
- Hypercorrection
- Imitation
- Mimic octopus
- Mirror neurons in monkeys
- Three wise monkeys
