= Richard M. Hurd =

American economist and activist(1865–1941)

Richard Melancthon Hurd
- Born: Richard Melancthon Hurd; June 14, 1865; Brooklyn, New York, United States
- Died: June 6, 1941 (aged 75); New York City, New York, United States
- Education: Yale University; St. Paul's School
- Occupations: Real estate economist, Banker, Political activist, New York State Prison Commissioner
- Employer(s): U.S. Mortgage & Trust Company; Mortgage Bond Company of New York; Lawyers Mortgage Trust
- Board member of: American Defense Society
- Children: Mary (Hurd) Lawrence; Eleanor (Hurd) Lee; Richard Melancthon Hurd, Jr. Clement Hurd; Lucy Lee Hurd
- Parent(s): Melancthon Montgomery; Clara Hatch Hurd

Richard Melancthon Hurd (June 14, 1865 – June 6, 1941) was a pioneer real estate economist and political activist.

Hurd was born in New York City and attended St. Paul's School. He graduated from Yale University in 1888, where he was a member of Skull and Bones and an editor of The Yale Record. Particularly in his youth he was an avid hiker and mountain climber and visited Europe during summer with his father to enjoy the activity. In 1889, Hurd was the referee of the very first University of Washington football game in Seattle.

He headed the mortgage department of the U.S. Mortgage & Trust Company in 1895. He married Lucy Gazzam of Seattle, Washington, in Mobile, Alabama, in 1898 and had five children. He was president of the Lawyers' Mortgage Insurance Company in 1903 when he published Principles of City Land Values.

During the First World War he was active as an officer of the American Defense Society, an organization that promoted America's entry into World War I and civilian initiatives to suppress dissent during the conflict. He was a close friend of Theodore Roosevelt. In 1917, when he was vice-president and director of the Mortgage Bond Company of New York, he was appointed a New York State Prison Commissioner. He was later President of Lawyers Mortgage Trust, a securitizer of urban commercial property mortgages. The company suffered financial losses and closed during the Great Depression.

His son Clement Hurd was an illustrator, known for the children's book Goodnight Moon.

He died at the Columbia Presbyterian Medical Center in New York City. He had been ill for more than a month.

== Sources ==
- "German Boycott Efforts". The New York Times. November 18, 1918.
- "Attacks German Insurance". The New York Times. November 12, 1917.
- "Wants No Credit Given to Germany". The New York Times. November 22, 1918.
