= Emily Wheelock Reed =

American librarian and civil rights activist

- Born: Nov 4, 1910; Asheville, North Carolina, U.S.
- Died: May 19, 2000 (aged 89); Cockeysville, Maryland, U.S.
- Education: Indiana University Bloomington; University of Michigan
- Occupation: Librarian
- Known for: civil rights activism

Emily Wheelock Reed (Nov 4,1910 – May 19, 2000) was a librarian in Alabama who served as director of the Alabama Public Library Service Division during the civil rights movement. She stood up to segregationists seeking to remove books such as the 1958 Garth Williams children's book, The Rabbits' Wedding, from state libraries.

== Early life, education, and career ==
Emily Wheelock Reed was born in Asheville, North Carolina, in 1910. A year following her birth, her family moved to the Midwest, where she was raised and educated in Culver, Indiana. She received her undergraduate degree from Indiana University Bloomington in 1937, where she was a member of Phi Beta Kappa. She completed her library degree at the University of Michigan.

Over the span of her career, Reed worked in various librarian capacities for numerous public and academic libraries including the University of Michigan, Florida State University, the Detroit Public Library, Hawaii State Public Library System in Kauaʻi County, the State Library of Louisiana, Alabama Public Library Service Division, the District of Columbia Public Library System, and the Enoch Pratt Free Library in Baltimore.

== The Rabbits' Wedding controversy ==
In 1957, Reed was appointed Director of the Alabama Public Library Service Division. In this role, she made budget requests to the legislature, and was responsible for selections and purchases of library materials across the state. Soon after she assumed the position, Reed found herself at odds with state politicians.

In 1959, segregationist Alabama citizens and legislators, led by Alabama State Senator Edward Oswell Eddins and the Citizens' Councils, initiated intense attack efforts against the 1958 Garth Williams children's book, The Rabbits' Wedding. The picture book, aimed towards children aged 3 to 7, depicted animals in a moonlit forest attending the wedding of a white rabbit to a black rabbit. Due to this content, the book was accused of promoting racial integration and interracial marriage, and demands were made to ban it from public library shelves. Eddins went so far as to suggest that "this book and many others should be taken off the shelves and burned".

Reed reviewed the book and, finding no objectionable content, determined it was her ethical duty to defend the book against an outright ban. Reed did not personally see the book as controversial and had not sought conflict by its inclusion in the library collections. If it was to be seen as pro-integration, however, Reed argued that it was the library agency's responsibility to provide balanced information regarding racial integration. Rather than remove the book from all library agency collections, Reed made the concession to have it placed on special reserve shelves where it would remain available to the interested public. Libraries with their own copies, not provided by the library agency, were not affected and could keep the book on the shelves.

Eddins was not pleased with this course of action and continued to challenge Reed, going so far as to threaten approval of her budget, bringing her before the Alabama legislature for questioning, and demanding her resignation. Rather than give in to threats and intimidation, Reed held her ground and the book remained in Alabama libraries. Later in that same year, she again angered segregationists when she distributed a reading list including other controversial titles such as Martin Luther King Jr.'s book, Stride Toward Freedom: The Montgomery Story.

== Last years and death ==
In 1960, Reed left Alabama to become coordinator of adult services for the District of Columbia Library System. Six years later, she became director of adult services at the Enoch Pratt Free Library in Baltimore, Maryland, a position she held until her retirement in 1977. Reed died on May 19, 2000, at her retirement community in Cockeysville, Maryland, at the age of 89.

== Legacy ==
During the time of The Rabbits' Wedding controversy, the American Library Association (ALA) remained silent on the issue and provided Reed no immediate assistance. Over time, however, the ALA has become much more outspoken and firmly committed to protecting intellectual freedom. Reed was awarded with the Freedom to Read Foundation Roll of Honor award in July 2000, a month after her death.

The story of The Rabbits' Wedding controversy was given dramatic treatment in a new play by Kenneth Jones, entitled Alabama Story. The play was given its first major reading in May 2013 as part of the Southern Writers' Project at Alabama Shakespeare Festival. Following further readings in Salt Lake City and New York City, Alabama Story received its world premiere at Pioneer Theatre Company, January 9–24, 2015, earning enthusiastic reviews.

Garth Williams, Emily Whitlock Reed, and Senator E.W. Higgins (inspired by Senator E.O. Eddins) are major characters in the six-actor play, which the playwright sets in "the Deep South of the Imagination." The play was a finalist in the 2014 National Playwrights Conference of the Eugene O'Neill Theater Center and (by fall 2025) has been produced in more than 80 cities.

Its second American staging was produced in spring 2016 by Florida Studio Theatre in Sarasota, Florida. Florida Studio Theatre artistic director Richard Hopkins called it "probably the best Southern play I’ve read in 10 or 20 years". It made its Montgomery, Alabama premiere in a full production by the Alabama Shakespeare Festival in March 2020, but the run was cut short by the week due to the dawning COVID pandemic that would shut down Broadway and theaters across the U.S. for 18 months. In summer 2021, the play was published by Dramatists Play Service, which also administers performance licenses to theaters.
