= The Rabbits' Wedding =

Children's picture book by Garth Williams

- First hardcover edition, 1958
- Author: Garth Williams
- Illustrator: Garth Williams
- Cover artist: Garth Williams
- Language: English
- Genre: Juvenile fiction
- Published: April 30, 1958
- Publisher: HarperCollins
- Publication place: United States
- Pages: 32
- OCLC: 60097060

The Rabbits' Wedding is a children's picture book created and illustrated by American author and illustrator Garth Williams, who came to the fore as a writer after his success as an illustrator with Stuart Little. The Rabbits' Wedding was published on April 30, 1958, and depicted the love affair and wedding of two bunnies, one white and one black. The following year it became the center of a controversy in the state of Alabama when Edward Oswell Eddins, State Senator from Marengo County, claimed the book was "propaganda for integration and intermarriage". Alabama's State Library Agency director, Emily Wheelock Reed, faced censorship challenges over the book at the height of the Civil Rights Movement in the American South.

Williams illustrated more than 70 books, the majority by other authors; The Rabbits' Wedding was the last of those he wrote. As of 2000, according to the Los Angeles Times, it remained in print.

== Plot summary ==
The rabbits live in the forest, where they go on journeys. The black rabbit (male) feels conflicted; finally he reveals why he has been depressed and thoughtful, conveying to the white rabbit (female) that he wishes she will stay by his side forever. The white rabbit accepts the black rabbit's wish and love. A wedding is celebrated and the bunnies dance under the moonlight with the other creatures of the forest.

== Censorship ==
The White Citizens Council of Montgomery, Alabama, attacked the book, claiming that it promoted interracial marriage in defiance of the laws against miscegenation. Against such attacks, the book found an advocate in Emily Wheelock Reed, director of the Alabama Public Library Service Division, whose job it was to provide libraries throughout the state with the books they requested.

Representative E. O. Eddins of Marengo County, Alabama, together with the White Citizen's Council, led the battle against Williams' book, and suggested Reed "put stock in racial incorporation": "This book and many others should be taken off the shelves and burned". As a result, the library system banned the book from all libraries in Alabama.

Reed (who said she enjoyed the book) complied to the extent that she moved it away from general circulation and instead put it on reserve, available upon request; this made the book still accessible to local librarians and thus was not a ban of the book: "We have had difficulty with the book, but we have not lost our integrity". Before the year was over, segregationists again found fault with Reed, who distributed a reading list that included various controversial titles including Martin Luther King Jr.'s book Stride Toward Freedom.

During an interview with The New York Times in 1959, Williams said, "[The Rabbits' Wedding] was not written for adults who will not understand it, because it is only about a soft, furry love and has no hidden messages of hate." Williams denied that his story, intended for children ages 3 to 7, was a purposeful anecdote of racial integration. "I was completely unaware that animals with white furs, such as white polar bears and white dogs and white rabbits, were considered blood relations of white human beings," Williams commented. Williams further explained to The New York Times: "I was only aware that a white horse next to a black horse looks very picturesque—and my rabbits were inspired by early Chinese paintings of black and white horses in misty landscapes."

A play about the censorship controversy, titled Alabama Story, was written by Kenneth Jones and first staged in 2015. Jones said he was inspired by Reed's obituary in The New York Times.
