= Margaret Wise Brown =

American writer (1910–1952)

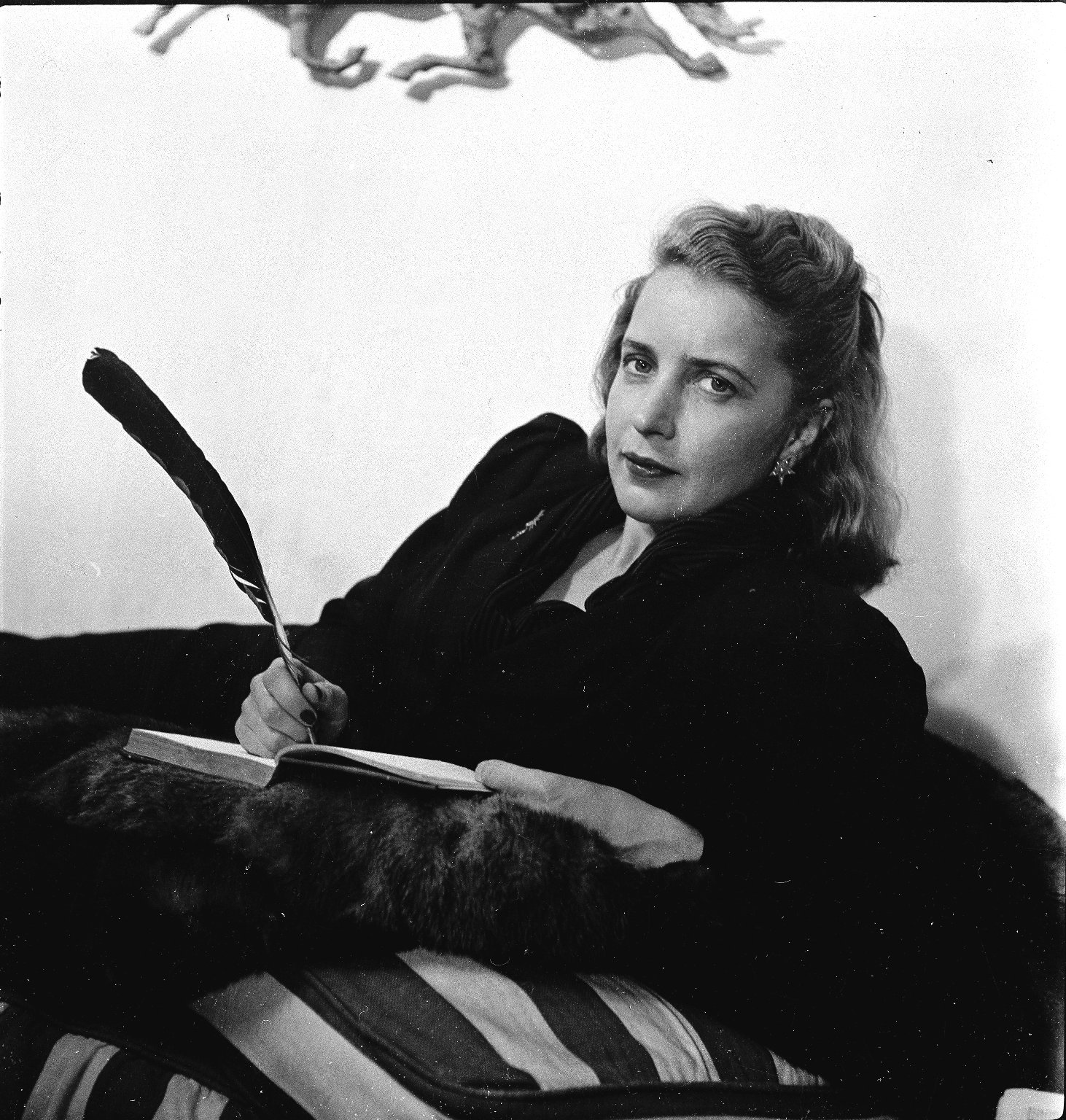
- Brown, c. 1940s-1950s
- Born: May 23, 1910; New York City, U.S.
- Died: November 13, 1952 (aged 42); Nice, France
- Education: Hollins College, 1932
- Occupations: Writer; editor
- Partners: Blanche Oelrichs; James Stillman 'Pebble' Rockefeller Jr.
- Writing career
- Pen name: Timothy Hay; Golden MacDonald; Juniper Sage
- Genre: Children's literature
- Notable works: Goodnight Moon; The Runaway Bunny; The Color Kittens

Margaret Wise Brown (May 23, 1910 – November 13, 1952) was an American writer of children's books, including Goodnight Moon (1947) and The Runaway Bunny (1942), both illustrated by Clement Hurd. She has been called "the laureate of the nursery" for her achievements. Besides her real name, she also used the noms-de-plume Golden MacDonald for Doubleday and Company, Timothy Hay for Harper & Brothers and Juniper Sage (her collaboration with Edith Thacher Hurd) for William R. Scott, Inc.

== Early life and education ==
Brown was born in the Brooklyn borough of New York City, the middle child of three children of Maude Margaret (Johnson) and Robert Bruce Brown. She was the granddaughter of politician Benjamin Gratz Brown. Her parents had an unhappy marriage. She was initially raised in Brooklyn's Greenpoint neighborhood, and later attended Chateau Brilliantmont boarding school in Lausanne, Switzerland, in 1923.

In 1925, Brown attended The Kew-Forest School. She began attending Dana Hall School in Wellesley, Massachusetts, in 1926, where she did well in athletics. After graduation in 1928, Brown went on to Hollins College in Roanoke, Virginia.

Brown was an avid, lifelong beagler and was noted for her ability to keep pace, on foot, with the hounds.

== Literary career ==
Following her graduation with a B.A. in English from Hollins in 1932, Brown worked as a teacher and also studied art. While working at the Bank Street Experimental School in New York City she started writing books for children. Bank Street promoted a new approach to children's education and literature, emphasizing the real world and the "here and now". This philosophy influenced Brown's work; she was also inspired by the poet Gertrude Stein, whose literary style influenced Brown's own writing.

Brown's first published children's book was When the Wind Blew, published in 1937 by Harper & Brothers. Impressed by Brown's "here and now" style, W. R. Scott hired her as his first editor in 1938. Through Scott, she published the Noisy Book series among others. As editor at Scott, one of Brown's first projects was to recruit contemporary authors to write children's books for the company. Ernest Hemingway and John Steinbeck neglected to respond, but Brown's hero, Gertrude Stein, accepted the offer. Stein's book The World is Round was illustrated by Clement Hurd, who had previously teamed with Brown on W. R. Scott's Bumble Bugs and Elephants, considered "perhaps the first modern board book for babies". Brown and Hurd later teamed on the children's book classics The Runaway Bunny and Goodnight Moon, published by Harper. In addition to publishing a number of Brown's books, under her editorship, W. R. Scott published Edith Thacher Hurd's first book, Hurry Hurry, and Esphyr Slobodkina's classic Caps for Sale.

For decades the New York Public Library did not include Goodnight Moon in its catalog due to the influence of retired librarian Anne Carrol Moore, who reportedly "hated" the book. It wasn't until 1972 that the book was finally made available to patrons.

From 1944 to 1946, Doubleday published three picture books written by Brown under the pseudonym "Golden MacDonald" (coopted from her friend's handyman) and illustrated by Leonard Weisgard. Weisgard was a runner-up for the Caldecott Medal in 1946, and he won the 1947 Medal for Little Lost Lamb and The Little Island. Two more of their collaborations appeared in 1953 and 1956, after Brown's death. The Little Fisherman, illustrated by Dahlov Ipcar, was published in 1945. The Little Fur Family, illustrated by Garth Williams, was published in 1946. Early in the 1950s, she wrote several books for the Little Golden Books series, including The Color Kittens, Mister Dog, and Scuppers The Sailor Dog.

== Personal life and death ==
While at Hollins, Brown was briefly engaged. She dated, for some time, an unknown "good, quiet man from Virginia", had a long-running affair with William Gaston, and had a summer romance with Preston Schoyer.

In the summer of 1940, Brown began a long-term relationship with Blanche Oelrichs (pen name Michael Strange), poet/playwright, actress, and the former wife of John Barrymore. The relationship, which began as a mentoring one, eventually became romantic and included cohabiting at 10 Gracie Square in New York, beginning in 1943. As a studio, they used Cobble Court, a wooden house later moved to Charles Street. Oelrichs, who was almost 20 years Brown's senior, died in 1950 of leukemia.

In 1952, Brown met James Stillman 'Pebble' Rockefeller Jr. at a party, and they became engaged.

Later that year, while on a book tour in Nice, France, she died at 42 of an embolism shortly after surgery for what was either an ovarian cyst or a ruptured appendix. The death occurred after she kicked up her leg to show the doctor how well she was feeling.

Brown went by various nicknames in different circles of friends. To her Dana Hall and Hollins friends she was "Tim", as her hair was the color of timothy hay. To Bank Street friends, she was "Brownie". To William Gaston she was "Goldie", in keeping with the use of Golden MacDonald as the author of The Little Island.

A 2022 profile in the New Yorker, titled "The Radical Woman Behind 'Goodnight Moon'", featured a trip through Brown's "Only House" island cottage in Vinalhaven, Maine, which still retains elements of her picture books. The profile includes an interview with Rockefeller, noting that he was one of the few living people who'd known Brown well. They had planned to marry in Panama and honeymoon aboard his boat, the Mandalay, but she did not recover. Rockefeller told the interviewer:

"She was so full in her own life. And yet there must have been a lack, somewhere along the line. But whether she would like an ordinary marriage, with children—I just couldn't really see her in that."

In 2018, Rockefeller released a memoir called Wayfarer, about his own long life of adventure, including his memories of Brown.

By the time of her death, Brown had authored well over 100 books. Her ashes were scattered at her island home, "The Only House", in Vinalhaven, Maine.

== Legacy ==
Brown bequeathed the royalties to many of her books including Goodnight Moon and The Runaway Bunny to Albert Clarke, the son of a neighbor who was nine years old when she died. In 2000, reporter Joshua Prager detailed in The Wall Street Journal the troubled life of Clarke, who squandered the millions of dollars the books had earned him and who believed that Brown was his mother, a claim others dismiss. Clarke died in 2018. His four children now hold the royalty rights, which will expire in 2043.

Brown left behind over 70 unpublished manuscripts. After unsuccessfully trying to sell them, her sister Roberta Brown Rauch kept them in a cedar trunk for decades. In 1991, a future biographer, Amy Gary of WaterMark Inc., rediscovered the paper-clipped bundles, more than 500 typewritten pages in all, and set about getting the stories published.

Many of Brown's books have been re-issued with new illustrations decades after their original publication. Many more of her books are still in print with the original illustrations. Her books have been translated into several languages. Full-length biographies on Brown have been written by Leonard S. Marcus (Harper Paperbacks, 1999) and by Amy Gary (Flatiron Books, 2017). There are also several biographies for children, including by Carol Greene (Rookie Biographies, 1994), Jill C. Wheeler (Checkerboard Books, 2006), Mac Barnett (HarperCollins, 2019), and Candice Ransom (William B Eerdmans, 2021). Claudia H. Pearson published a Freudian analysis of Brown's "classic series" of bunny books, titled Have a Carrot (Look Again Press, 2010).

In 2016, Hollins University honored her by establishing the Margaret Wise Brown Prize in Children’s Literature.

== Selected works ==
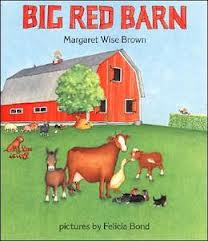
Big Red Barn (reissue), illustrated by Felicia Bond

During her lifetime, Brown essentially had four publishers: Harper & Brothers, W. R. Scott, Doubleday, and Little Golden Books. The books written for Doubleday were published under the pseudonym "Golden MacDonald". All were unpaged picture books illustrated by Leonard Weisgard. Two appeared after her death.

- When the Wind Blew, illus. Rosalie Slocum (Harper & Brothers, 1937); re-issued by HarperCollins in 1986 illus. Geoffrey Hayes
- Bumble Bugs and Elephants: a Big and Little Book, illus. Clement Hurd (W. R. Scott, 1938)
- The Little Fireman, illus. Esphyr Slobodkina (W. R. Scott, 1938)
- Noisy Book series
  - The Noisy Book, illus. Leonard Weisgard (W. R. Scott, 1939)
  - The Country Noisy Book, illus. Leonard Weisgard (W. R. Scott, 1940)
  - The Seashore Noisy Book, illus. Leonard Weisgard (W. R. Scott, 1941)
  - The Indoor Noisy Book, illus. Leonard Weisgard (W. R. Scott, 1942)
  - The Noisy Bird Book, illus. Leonard Weisgard (W. R. Scott, 1943)
  - The Winter Noisy Book, illus. Charles Green Shaw (W. R. Scott, 1947)
  - The Quiet Noisy Book, illus. Leonard Weisgard (Harper, 1950)
  - The Summer Noisy Book, illus. Leonard Weisgard (Harper, 1951)
- Baby Animals, illus. Mary Cameron (Random House, 1941)
- The Runaway Bunny, illus. Clement Hurd (Harper, 1942)
- Don't Frighten the Lion, illus. H. A. Rey (Harper, 1942)
- Big Dog, Little Dog, illus. Leonard Weisgard (Doubleday, Doran and Company, 1943) ‡
- Horses, illus. Dorothy F. Wagstaff (Harper, 1944), as by "Timothy Hay" and "Wag", OCLC 5047734
- Red Light Green Light, illus. Leonard Weisgard (Doubleday, 1944) ‡
- A Child's Good Night Book, illus. Jean Charlot (W. R. Scott, 1944)
- They All Saw It, illus. Ylla (Harper, 1944)
- The Little Fisherman, illus. Dahlov Ipcar (W. R. Scott, 1945). Reissued 2015.
- Little Lost Lamb, illus. Leonard Weisgard (Doubleday, 1945) ‡
- The Little Island, illus. Leonard Weisgard (Doubleday, 1946) ‡
- Little Fur Family, illus. Garth Williams (Harper, 1946)
- The Man in the Manhole and the Fix-It Men, illus. Bill Ballantine (New York: W. R. Scott, 1946), written by Brown and Edith Thacher Hurd as "Juniper Sage", OCLC 1698467
- Goodnight Moon, illus. Clement Hurd (Harper, 1947)
- The Golden Egg Book, illus. Leonard Weisgard (Little Golden Books, 1947)
- The Sleepy Little Lion, illus. Ylla (Harper, 1947)
- The Golden Sleepy Book, illus. Garth Williams (Golden Classic, 1948)
- The Little Cowboy, illus. Esphyr Slobodkina (W. R. Scott, 1948)
- The Little Farmer, illus. Esphyr Slobodkina (W. R. Scott, 1948)
- Wait till the Moon is Full, illus. Garth Williams (Harper, 1948)
- The Important Book, illus. Leonard Weisgard (Harper, 1949)
- The Color Kittens, illus. Alice and Martin Provensen (Little Golden Books, 1949)
- Two Little Miners, with Edith Thacher Hurd, illus. Richard Scarry (Little Golden Books, 1949)
- My World, illus. Clement Hurd (Harper, 1949)
- A Pussycat's Christmas, illus. Helen Stone (Thomas Y. Crowell Co., 1949)
- O Said the Squirrel, illus. Ylla (London: Harvill Press, 1950)
- The Dark Wood of the Golden Birds, illus. Leonard Weisgard (Harper, 1950)
- Fox Eyes, illus. Garth Williams (Pantheon Books, 1951)
- The Train to Timbuctoo, illus. Art Seiden (Little Golden Books, 1951)
- The Duck, illus. Ylla (Harper; Harvill, 1952)
- Mister Dog: The Dog Who Belonged to Himself, illus. Garth Williams (Little Golden Books, 1952)
- Doctor Squash, The Doll Doctor, illus. David Hitch (Random House, 1952)

=== Published posthumously ===
- Little Frightened Tiger, illus. Leonard Weisgard (Doubleday, 1953) ‡
- Scuppers The Sailor Dog, illus. Garth Williams (Little Golden Books, 1953)
- Big Red Barn, illus. Rosella Hartman (W. R. Scott, 1956); re-issued by HarperCollins in 1989 illus. Felicia Bond
- The Little Brass Band, illus. Clement Hurd (Harper & Brothers, 1955)
- Three Little Animals, illus. Garth Williams (Harper, 1956)
- Home for a Bunny, illus. Garth Williams (Golden Press, 1956)
- Whistle for the Train, illus. Leonard Weisgard (Doubleday, 1956) ‡
- The Dead Bird, illus. Remy Charlip (Addison-Wesley Publishing, 1958), re-issued in 2016 with illustrations by Christian Robinson
- Under the Sun and the Moon and Other Poems, illus. Tom Leonard (Hyperion, 1993)
- Sleepy ABC, illus. Esphyr Slobodkina (HarperCollins, 1994)
- Another Important Book, illus. Christopher Raschka (Joanna Cotler Books, 1999)
- Bunny's Noisy Book, illus. Lisa McCue (Hyperion, 2000)
- The Fierce Yellow Pumpkin, illus. Richard Egielski (HarperCollins, 2003)
- The Fathers Are Coming Home, illus. Stephen Savage (Margaret K. McElderry Books, 2010)
- Count to 10 with a Mouse, illus. Kirsten Richards (Parragon, 2012)
- Goodnight Little One, illus. Rebecca Elliott (Parragon, 2012)
- Away in My Airplane, illus. Henry Fisher (Parragon, 2013)
- The Diggers, illus. Antoine Corbineau (Parragon, 2013)
- Sleep Tight, Sleepy Bears, illus. Julie Clay (Parragon, 2013)
- One More Rabbit, illus. Emma Levey (Parragon, 2014)
- The Noon Balloon, illus. Lorena Alvarez (Parragon, 2014)
- Goodnight Songs, multiple illustrators (Sterling Children's Books, 2014)
- Goodnight Songs: a Celebration of the Seasons, (Sterling Children's Books, 2014)
- Love Song of the Little Bear, illus. Katy Hudson (Parragon, 2015)
- The Find It Book, illus. Lisa Sheehan (Parragon, 2015)
- Goodnight Little One, illus. Rebecca Elliot (Parragon, 2016)
- Good Day, Good Night, illus. Loren Long (HarperCollins, 2017)
- Be Brave, Little Tiger!, illus. Jeane Claude (Parragon, 2017)
- The Happy Little Rabbit, illus. Emma Levey (Parragon, 2017)

‡ Published under the pen name "Golden MacDonald."

== Bibliography ==
- "Beyond the Top 50: Toddler Tales", USA Today (September 12, 1996).
- "Brown, Margaret Wise 1910-1952". Something About the Author vol. 100 (1999), pp. 35–39.
- Churnin, Nancy. "Goodnight and Sweet Dreams", The Dallas Morning News (January 5, 2001).
- Fleischman, John. "Shakespeare of the Sandbox Set", Parents vol. 63 (July 1988), pp. 92–96.
- Gary, Amy. In the Great Green Room: The Brilliant Bold Life of Margaret Wise Brown, Flatiron Books (2017) ISBN 978-1-25006536-0
- Gaston, Bibi. The Loveliest Woman in America: A Tragic Actress, Her Lost Diaries, and Her Granddaughter's Search for Home, William Morrow (2008). ISBN 978-0-06-085770-7
- Groth, Chuck. "An Heirloom for Fans of Goodnight Moon", St. Louis Post-Dispatch (February 19, 1995).
- Hurd, Clement. "Remembering Margaret Wise Brown", Horn Book (October 1983).
- Marcus, Leonard S., Margaret Wise Brown: Awakened by the Moon, Beacon Press (February 1992). ISBN 978-0-8070-7048-2
- Mainiero, Lina. "Margaret Wise Brown." American Women Writers: Volume 1. Frederick Unger Press. (1979), pp. 254 - 257.
- Mitchell, Lucy Sprague Mitchell. "Margaret Wise Brown, 1910-1952", Bank Street (1953).
- Pate, Nancy. "Good Gosh: Goodnight Moon is 50", Orlando Sentinel (February 24, 1997).
- Pearson, Claudia (2010). Have a Carrot: Oedipal Theory and Symbolism in Margaret Wise Brown's Runaway Bunny Trilogy. Look Again Press. ISBN 978-1-4524-5500-6.
- Pichey, Martha. "Bunny Dearest", Vanity Fair (December 2000), pp. 172–87.
