= Little Fur Family =

1946 picture book by Margaret Wise Brown

- First edition
- Author: Margaret Wise Brown
- Illustrator: Garth Williams
- Language: English
- Genre: Children's literature
- Publisher: Harper & Brothers
- Publication date: 1946
- Publication place: United States
- Media type: Print
- Pages: 32
- ISBN: 978-0-06-051898-1
- OCLC: 10872645

Little Fur Family is a 1946 picture book written by Margaret Wise Brown and illustrated by Garth Williams. It tells the story of a little fur child's day in the woods. The day ends when his big fur parents tuck him in bed "all soft and warm," and sing him to sleep with a bedtime song.

== Publication history ==
This book is the first Brown and Williams collaboration; Harper's answer to Simon & Schuster's hugely popular Pat the Bunny. Other books Brown and Williams worked on together include Wait till the Moon is Full (1948), Fox Eyes (1951), Mister Dog: The Dog Who Belonged to Himself (1952), Scuppers The Sailor Dog (1953), Three Little Animals (1956), and Home for a Bunny (1956).

Little Fur Family is notable for its front cover, which features a patch of "fur" on the fur child's body that the reader can touch. The original edition of the book was entirely wrapped in real rabbit fur. At 50,000 copies printed, it has been estimated that 15,000 rabbits were killed and skinned to provide enough fur. The fur-covered original edition also—perhaps unintentionally—references Méret Oppenheim's well-known Surrealist art piece Breakfast in Fur (Object Le Déjeuner en fourrure), a fur-covered teacup, saucer and spoon.

Editor Ursula Nordstrom knew the book would be a success when a mother wrote to tell her that her little boy had held open his copy at the dinner table and tried to feed it his supper.

== Plot summary ==
A little fur family (mother, father, and a child) live in a cozy house in a tree trunk. Secure in his cozy home, the fur child goes out to explore his world. He finds some creatures that are like him and others that are very different, including fish, a flying bug, and in one of the book's most memorable sequences, a tiny version of himself (which he kisses and sends it on its way). Even in the fur child's comfortable, familiar surroundings, there are just enough unfamiliar things to make his day interesting. At the end of the day, the child's parents and his dinner are waiting for him at home.

== Themes ==
The fur family are unidentifiable mammals. The book examines themes of exploration and discovery, the familiar and unfamiliar, and the simultaneous excitement and fear of the unknown. It has also been suggested that the book is a story of life and death, and "... the power struggles implicit in growing up.... By sparing the lives of the fish, the bug, and his miniature counterpart, the fur child shows that he knows how to use his new-found power benignly and well. In the poignant logic of the tale, acquiring that knowledge is recognizing the power of love."

Brown's text, always lyrical, alternates between rhyme and straight prose; as well as making much use of onomatopoeia.
