= Clement Hurd =

American artist (1908–1988)

- Born: Clement Gazzam Hurd; January 12, 1908; New York City, U.S.
- Died: February 5, 1988 (aged 80); San Francisco, California, U.S.
- Education: St. Paul's School; Fernand Léger
- Known for: Illustration, Painting
- Notable work: Runaway Bunny series
- Spouse: Edith Thacher Hurd
- Children: John Thacher Hurd
- Father: Richard Melancthon Hurd

Clement Gazzam Hurd (January 12, 1908 – February 5, 1988) was an American artist. He is known for illustrations of children's picture books, especially collaborations with writer Margaret Wise Brown, including Goodnight Moon (1947) and The Runaway Bunny (1942).

== Biography ==
=== Early life ===
Hurd was born in New York City, the son of Richard Melancthon Hurd, an economist and mortgage banker, and his wife Lucy Gazzam Hurd. He was educated at St. Paul's School in Concord, New Hampshire, then studied architecture at Yale University and painting with Fernand Léger in Paris.

=== Career ===
Hurd returned to New York in 1933 to work as a commercial artist. There, Margaret Wise Brown was an editor at W. R. Scott, as well as a writer of picture book texts. On seeing two of his paintings, she asked him if he would consider illustrating children's books. She wrote a text herself, for what became Bumble Bugs and Elephants (1938) —"perhaps the first modern board book for babies." Hurd's next collaboration with Brown, The Runaway Bunny, has been in print continuously since its 1942 publication. Their next book, Goodnight Moon (1947), is considered classic children's literature in North America; by 1990, the total number of copies sold was more than four million. In 2007, the National Education Association listed Goodnight Moon as one of its "Teachers' Top 100 Books for Children". In 2012 it was ranked number four among the "Top 100 Picture Books" in a survey published by School Library Journal.

Hurd also illustrated over fifty books written by his wife, Edith Thacher Hurd (a friend of Brown's), as well as a children's book written by Gertrude Stein, The World Is Round. Hurd wrote and illustrated the book Run, Run, Run.

Hurd died of Alzheimer's disease at a San Francisco hospital in 1988.

=== Personal life ===
His son, Thacher Hurd, is also a children's book author and illustrator, and referred in an interview to the "wonderful aura of creativity" surrounding his father and the Vermont farm that was their home.

== Legacy ==
A doctored/altered photo of Hurd was included in the 60th anniversary republication of Goodnight Moon with a cigarette removed from his hand, an incident of tobacco bowdlerization that caused controversy over publication standards. HarperCollins had the reluctant permission of Hurd's son Thacher Hurd, but he said the photo of his father with one arm extended, holding nothing, "looks slightly absurd to me".

Hurd's work, as well as that of his wife and son, were featured at the Stamford Museum & Nature Center in the 2004 exhibition "From Goodnight Moon to Art Dog: The World of Clement, Edith and Thatcher Hurd."

== Selected works ==
- The World Is Round (New York: W. R. Scott, 1939), words by Gertrude Stein, OCLC 10175454
- The Merry Chase (Random House, 1941)
- The Race Between the Monkey and the Duck (Wonder Books, 1946)
- Run Run Run: Story of Black Cat and Dog (Harper, 1951), OCLC 1412335
- Margaret Wise Brown
  - Bumble Bugs and Elephants (W. R. Scott, 1938)
  - The Runaway Bunny (Harper, 1942)
  - Goodnight Moon (Harper, 1947)
  - My World (Harper, 1949), Brown – a Goodnight Moon book
  - Good-night Moon Room (Harper, 1984) — pop-up book version
  - Goodnight Moon's 123: A Counting Book (HarperCollins, 2007)
  - Goodnight Moon's ABC: An Alphabet Book (HarperCollins, 2010)
- Edith Thacher Hurd
  - Benny the Bulldozer (Lothrop, Lee & Shepard Co., 1947)
  - Little Brass Band (Harper, 1955)
  - Windy and the Willow Whistle (Sterling, 1956)
  - Mr. Charlie, the Fireman's Friend (Lippincott, 1958)
  - Last One Home is a Green Pig (Harper, 1959)
  - Hurry Hurry (Harper, 1960)
  - Come and Have Fun (Harper, 1962)
  - Christmas Eve (Harper, 1962)
  - No Funny Business (Harper, 1962)
  - The Day the Sun Danced (Harper, 1965)
  - Johnny Lion's Book (Harper, 1965)
  - What Whale? Where? (Harper, 1966)
  - The Blue Heron Tree (Viking, 1968)
  - This is the Forest (Coward-McCann, 1969)
  - Catfish (Viking, 1970)
  - Johnny Lion's Bad Day (Harper, 1970)
  - Wilson's World (Harper, 1971)
  - Johnny Lion's Rubber Boots (Harper, 1972)
  - The Mother Owl (Little, Brown, 1974)
  - The Mother Kangaroo (Little, Brown, 1976)
  - Look for a Bird (Harper, 1977)
  - The Mother Chimpanzee (Little, Brown, 1978)
  - Under the Lemon Tree (Little, Brown, 1980)
