= A Visit to William Blake's Inn =

1981 picture book by Nancy Willard

- Front cover including Newbery Medal and Caldecott Honor seals
- Author: Nancy Willard
- Illustrator: Alice and Martin Provensen
- Cover artist: Provensen
- Language: English
- Genre: Poetry, picture book
- Publisher: Harcourt Brace & Company
- Publication date: 1981
- Publication place: United States
- Pages: 44 pp
- ISBN: 0-15-293823-0
- OCLC: 7573231
- LC Class: PS3573.I444 V5 1981

A Visit to William Blake's Inn: Poems for Innocent and Experienced Travelers is a children's picture book written by Nancy Willard and illustrated by Alice and Martin Provensen, published by Harcourt Brace in 1981. The next year Willard won the annual Newbery Medal and the Provensens were one runner-up for the Caldecott Medal from the professional children's librarians. William Blake's Inn was the first Newbery-winning book to also be named a Caldecott Honor Book. (Note: Chris Van Allsburg won the 1982 Caldecott Medal for Jumanji and there were four runners-up including the Provensens for A Visit to William Blake's Inn.) Last Stop on Market Street later won the 2016 Newbery Medal and a Caldecott Honor.

The title alludes to Willard's inspiration by William Blake's Songs of Innocence and of Experience.

== Content ==
In a prose introduction, Willard tells how she was introduced to the poetry of William Blake when she was ill as a seven-year-old. She asked her babysitter, Miss Pratt, for a story "about lions and tigers" and Miss Pratt responded with Blake's "The Tyger". Two days later she received a copy of "Songs of Innocence and of Experience" inscribed "Poetry is the best medicine. Best wishes for a speedy recovery. yrs, William Blake."

The sixteen poems that follow, including an epilogue, describe the events of a day and a half of a child's visit to William Blake's Inn. Inhabited by such creatures as the Rabbit, the Rat, the Wise Cow, the King of Cats, the Tiger, the Man in the Marmalade Hat, and of course William Blake himself, it is a place of wonder and magic.

Poems

- William Blake’s Inn for Innocent and Experienced Travelers
- Blake’s Wonderful Car Delivers Us Wonderfully Well
- A Rabbit Reveals My Room
- The Sun and Moon Circus Soothes the Wakeful Guests
- The Man in the Marmalade Hat Arrives
- The King of Cats Orders an Early Breakfast
- The Wise Cow Enjoys a Cloud
- Two Sunflowers Move into the Yellow Room — frequently misattributed to Blake
- The Wise Cow Makes Way, Room, and Believe
- Blake Leads a Walk on the Milky Way
- When We Come Home, Blake Calls for Fire
- The Marmalade Man Makes a Dance to Mend Us
- The King of Cats Sends a Postcard to His Wife
- The Tiger Asks Blake for a Bedtime Story
- Blake Tells the Tiger the Tale of the Tailor
- Epilogue

== Style ==
Willard's poetry is metrical and rhyming, simple in many ways but never simplistic. Hints of a larger universe or magical forces at work are never far from the surface. In the central "Blake Leads a Walk on the Milky Way", most of the characters express wonder and awe at the eternal beauty around them and are rewarded by Blake with gifts of stars, while the rat, sullen and cynical, receives only "a handful of dirt".

The illustrations are whimsical, iconic gouache paintings, making great use of the architecture of Blake's England.

== Reception ==
At the time of the book's publication, Kirkus Reviews said, "It's just as well that the Provensens' manner is poles apart from the visionary intensity of Blake's, but one wonders how Blake's work would inspire Willard to invoke his image and meter to such whimsical purpose." In a retrospective essay about the Newbery Medal-winning books from 1976 to 1985, literary critic Zena Sutherland wrote, "The poems, sometimes playful or even humorous, are just as often thoughtful, and they have fresh, felicitous phrasing to bring vision as a complementary component to writing that shows good control of rhyme, rhythm, and form."

== Derivative work ==
A Visit to William Blake's Inn has been set to music as a song cycle by American composer Dale Lyles.

== Misattribution ==
All fifteen poems were written by Willard for the book. One of them, "Two Sunflowers Move into the Yellow Room", has been attributed to Blake many times, especially since 2001 as the error has proliferated online. It has been analysed as Blake's work and across the English-speaking world "many schools have been teaching the poem as an example of Blake's work."

The mistake was discovered by Thomas Pitchford, a secondary school librarian in Hertfordshire, who "thought the style bore little relation to the poet's other work" and traced the poem to A Visit to William Blake's Inn.

== Notes ==
Awards
Preceded by Jacob Have I Loved	Newbery Medal recipient 1982	Succeeded by Dicey's Song
