= Alice and Martin Provensen =

American wife-and-husband illustrator duo

Alice Rose Provensen (née Twitchell; 1918–2018) and Martin Provensen (1916–1987) were an American couple who illustrated more than 40 children's books together, 19 of which they also wrote and edited. According to Alice, "we were a true collaboration. Martin and I really were one artist."

== Biographies ==
Alice Rose Twitchell was born August 14, 1918. Martin Provensen was born July 10, 1916.

Their early lives were similar. Both were born in Chicago and moved to California when they were twelve. Both received scholarships to the Art Institute of Chicago, and both attended the University of California, though at separate campuses. After college, Alice went to work with Walter Lantz Studio, the creators of Woody Woodpecker, and Martin took work with the Walt Disney Studio, where he collaborated on Pinocchio, Fantasia, and Dumbo.

The pair met in 1943 when Martin, working as a creator of training films for the American military, was assigned to the Walter Lantz Studio. They were married in 1944 and settled in Washington, D.C., where they worked on war-related projects. After the war, they moved to New York City where a friend helped them get their first job, illustrating The Fireside Book of Folk Songs. They illustrated several Little Golden Books including The Color Kittens by Margaret Wise Brown (1949). In 1952, Tony the Tiger, designed by Martin, debuted as a Kellogg's mascot.

The Provensens were a runner-up for the 1982 Caldecott Medal as illustrators of A Visit to William Blake's Inn by Nancy Willard (who won the companion Newbery Medal). Two years later they won the Caldecott for The Glorious Flight, the story of aviator Louis Blériot, the first man to fly solo across the English Channel, which they also wrote. The annual award by U.S. professional librarians recognizes the year's "most distinguished American picture book for children". Eight of their books were named to The New York Times annual Ten Best Illustrated Books, including Our Animal Friends at Maple Hill Farm (1974) and An Owl and Three Pussycats (1981). The couple were collaborative illustrators for Donald Waxman's "Pageants for Piano," a series of pedagogical primers.

The couple lived for many years at Maple Hill Farm in Dutchess County, New York, which they portrayed in A Year at Maple Hill Farm (1978) as well as Our Animal Friends. Martin died of a heart attack on March 27, 1987, in Staatsburg. Alice continued to live and work at Maple Hill Farm, publishing solo work such as The Buck Stops Here: The Presidents of the United States (1990) and My Fellow Americans: A Family Album (1995), two presentations of people and events from American history (juvenile nonfiction).Punch in New York, published in 1991, received several honors and is dedicated to her grandson, Sean.

After turning ninety, Alice moved to San Clemente, California, to live with her daughter, Karen Mitchell, and her family. Provensen continued working (an addition was added to her daughter's house for a studio) well into her nineties. She died April 23, 2018, at age 99.

== Books ==
- The Fuzzy Duckling, by Jane Werner Watson (Little Golden Book 1949)
- Katie the Kitten, by Kathryn & Byron Jackson
- The Little Fat Policeman, by Margaret Wise Brown and Edith Thacher Hurd (Little Golden Book 1950)
- Tales from the Ballet, selected by Louis Untermeyer (Golden Press, 1968)
- The Mother Goose Book (Random House, 1976)
- The Provensen Animal Book (Golden Press, 1952), a.k.a. The Animal Fair
- A Horse and a Hound, A Goat and A Gander ~Maple Hill Farm content
- Town & Country
- My Little Hen (Random House, 1973) ~Maple Hill Farm content
- A Child's Garden of Verses (Simon and Schuster, 1951)
- Leonardo da Vinci (Paper engineering by John Strejan, The Viking Press,1984)
- The Golden Bible: The New Testament (Golden Press, 1953)
- The Golden Treasury of Myths and Legends by Anne Terry White (Golden Press, 1959)
- Aesop's Fables (Golden Press)
- The Iliad and the Odyssey by Jane Werner Watson (Golden Press, 1956)
- What Is a Color?
- The Book of Seasons (Random House)
- Golden Book of Fun and Nonsense
- The Provensen Book of Fairy Tales
- The Color Kittens, by Margaret Wise Brown (Little Golden Books, 1949)
- Alfred Lord Tennyson's Charge of the Light Brigade (Golden; Paul Hamlyn, 1964) — an edition of Tennyson's 1854 poem
- Our Animal Friends at Maple Hill Farm (Random House, 1974) ~Maple Hill Farm content
- A Peaceable Kingdom: the Shaker abecedarius (Viking, 1978) — an edition of "Rhymes of Animals", Shaker Manifesto, July 1882
- The Year at Maple Hill Farm (Atheneum, 1978) ~Maple Hill Farm content
- An Owl and Three Pussycats (Atheneum, 1981) ~Maple Hill Farm content
- A Visit to William Blake's Inn: poems for innocent and experienced travelers, by Nancy Willard (Harcourt Brace, 1981)
- The Glorious Flight: Across the Channel with Louis Bleriot, July 25, 1909 (Viking, 1983)
- The Voyage of the Ludgate Hill: travels with Robert Louis Stevenson, by Nancy Willard (Harcourt Brace, 1987)
- Shaker Lane (Viking, 1987)
- Come, Lord Jesus (~1965)
- Funny Bunny by Rachel Learnard (Golden)
- Fireside Book of Folk Songs
- Fireside Book of Love Songs
- Fireside Cookbook
- Roses Are Red, Are Violets Blue? (Random House)
- Instruments of the Orchestra, by Jane Bunche
- Ten Great Plays, by William Shakespeare (Hamlyn, 1963)
- Who's in the Egg? (Golden, 1970)
- A Play on Words (Random House, 1970)
- The Golden Serpent by Walter Dean Myers (Viking, 1980)
- Birds, beasts, and the third thing: poems by D.H. Lawrence (Viking, 1982) — an edition of Lawrence's 1925 collection
- Karen's Opposites (Golden, 1963)
- Karen's Curiosity (Golden, 1963)
- "The Old-Fashioned Cookbook" by Jan McBride Carlton (Weathervane Books, 1975)

Publications by Alice Provensen after 1988

- The Buck Stops Here: the presidents of the United States (Harper & Row, 1990)
- Punch in New York (Viking, 1991) ‡
- My Fellow Americans: a family album (San Diego: Browndeer Press, 1995)
- Count on me (Harcourt Brace, 1998) — set of 10 board books ‡
- The Master Swordsman & The Magic Doorway: two legends from ancient China, retold and illus. Alice Provensen (Simon & Schuster Books for Young Readers, 2001) ‡
- A Day in the Life of Murphy (S&S BYR, 2003) ‡ ~Maple Hill Farm content
- Klondike Gold (S&S BYR, 2005) ‡

‡ unpaged picture books
