= John Strejan =

Children's pop-up book artist and paper engineer

- Born: John Strejan; March 7, 1933; Detroit, Michigan
- Died: March 26, 2003 (aged 70); Los Angeles, California
- Other name: Silverblade

John Strejan (March 7, 1933 – March 26, 2003) was a children's pop-up book artist and paper engineer.

== Biography ==
Strejan was born in Detroit, Michigan on March 7, 1933, and died in Los Angeles, California on 26 March 2003.

He grew up in Portland, Oregon, and attended Portland State University. He began his career in the city as an illustrator and designer in advertising, moving to Los Angeles in 1958. As well as working for advertising agencies, he was art director for Teen magazine and Bullock's department store. In 1965 he began working on the design of pop-up books for Elgin Davis at Graphics International. He went on to participate in the creation of more than 50 books, as a freelance author, illustrator and designer of pop-up mechanisms. He also created pop-up models of the Cinderella Castle and Getty Centre, designed posters for Toy Story, and is credited as a production designer on a short animated film, Pinocchio (1987).

"You have to think like a child, that's your marketplace, to think like a child would think," said freelance paper engineer John Strejan, 54, known by his peers as "the Blade," "Silverblade" or "the Maestro" for his masterful skill with an X-Acto knife, the tool of the paper engineer's trade.

— Chris Christensen, Los Angeles Times

Compared to earlier pop-ups, Strejan's work was noted for a dynamic use of motion, using the unfolding of the mechanism to animate the design.

== Works ==
- Charles M. Schulz; John Strejan (1984). Snoopy and the Twelve Days of Christmas. Determined Productions. OCLC 12513772.
- Jonathan Miller; David Pelham; John Strejan (1984). The Facts of Life. Viking. OCLC 1962109140.
- Alice and Martin Provensen; John Strejan (1984). Leonardo da Vinci. Viking.
- Ron Van der Meer; Alan McGowan; Borje Svensson; John Strejan; David Rosendale (1984). Sailing Ships. Viking. p. 16. OCLC 11434060.
- Michaël Welply; Dawn Bentley; John Strejan (1998). Choo-Choo Charlie, The Littletown Train. Kansas City, MO: Piggy Toes. OCLC 39399495.
