= The Sailor Dog =

1953 children's book by Margaret Wise Brown and Garth Williams

- First edition
- Author: Margaret Wise Brown
- Illustrator: Garth Williams
- Language: English
- Genre: Children's literature
- Publisher: Little Golden Books
- Publication date: 1953
- Publication place: United States
- Media type: Print
- Pages: 28
- ISBN: 978-0-307-00143-6
- OCLC: 933597

Scuppers The Sailor Dog (or simply The Sailor Dog) is a children's book written by Margaret Wise Brown and illustrated by Garth Williams.

== Publication history ==
The book was originally published in 1953 by Little Golden Books, the year after Brown's death.

An interactive CD-ROM version was published in 1996.

The 2001 edition lacks four pages of color illustrations and text found in the original 1953 edition as well as the cover illustration from the original (replaced by the illustration from Page 23).

== Plot summary ==
Scuppers the dog has an irresistible urge to sail the sea. His little gaff-rigged sailing boat hardly looks seaworthy, with colorful patches on its sails. Though not a luxurious boat, Scuppers keeps it neat and "ship-shape." He has a hook for his hat, his rope, and his spyglass. Scuppers gets shipwrecked after a big storm. Being a resourceful dog, he soon makes a house out of driftwood.

Eventually, Scuppers repairs his ship and sails away, arriving at a seaport in a foreign land. The street scene is straight from a canine Kasbah. There are lady dogs dressed in full-length robes with everything but their eyes, paws, and tails covered, balancing jars on their heads. Scuppers needs new clothes after all his travels. He tries on various hats and shoes of different shapes and colors.

Life at sea soon calls Scuppers back to his boat. After stowing all his gear in its right place, he is back "where he wants to be — a sailor sailing the deep green sea."

It is believed the story is based on the real-life dog, Scuppers, who resided in the South-Eastern United States and had frequent interactions with Margaret Wise Brown.

== Reception ==
Kirkus Reviews wrote of the book: "Funny, sagacious pictures by Garth Williams go with the one-dog, he-dog adventures of Scuppers."
