= The Color Kittens =

1949 children's book by Margaret Wise Brown

- First edition
- Author: Margaret Wise Brown
- Illustrator: Alice and Martin Provensen
- Language: English
- Genre: Children's literature
- Publisher: Little Golden Books
- Publication date: 1949
- Publication place: United States
- Media type: Print
- Pages: 24
- ISBN: 0-307-10234-3
- OCLC: 42383466
- Dewey Decimal: [E] 21
- LC Class: PZ7.B8163 Cm 2000

The Color Kittens is a children's book by Margaret Wise Brown, illustrated by Alice and Martin Provensen, and published, as part of the Little Golden Books series, in 1949.

== Plot ==
The story revolves around two kittens, "Hush" and "Brush," who attempt to create their favorite color green by mixing the primary colors red, yellow and blue, and black and white. Their attempts lead to pink, orange and purple before "almost by accident," they mix yellow and blue to successfully create green. Now they have the colors to paint everything they see around them. Later when they fall asleep, they dream about things in various colors.

== Publication history ==
- The Color Kittens, 1949, USA, Simon and Schuster OCLC 1392362
- The Colour Kittens, 1973, Australia, Golden Press OCLC 607091308
- The Color Kittens, (Kathi Ember, illustrator) 1994, USA, Western Publishing ISBN 9780307302175
- The Color Kittens, 2003, USA, Random House ISBN 9780307021410

== Reception ==
Children's book author and illustrator Paul O. Zelinsky, for whom the book was a childhood favorite and inspiration, said that, "In a way, the book was written to teach facts about color, but its real subject is the huge pleasure to be found in the seeing and feeling of color [...]". Suzanne Rahn notes that Hush and Brush's active creativity and exploration have some parallels among Brown's other cat characters, such as the drastically less-humanized Pussycat, who are much more passive in their representation of the creative state Brown called “Cat Life”.
