= Nancy Willard =

American writer

Nancy Willard (June 26, 1936 – February 19, 2017) was an American writer: novelist, poet, author and occasional illustrator of children's books. She won the 1982 Newbery Medal for A Visit to William Blake's Inn.

== Biography ==
Willard was born in Ann Arbor, Michigan, where she later received the B.A. and Ph.D. from the University of Michigan and won five Hopwood Awards for creative writing. She also studied at Stanford University, where she received her M.A.

Her first novel, Things Invisible to See (1985), is set in her home town of Ann Arbor in the 1940s. Two brothers become involved with a paralyzed young woman, and it "ends with a baseball game that anticipates the film Field of Dreams in its player lineup of baseball luminaries. Susan Fromberg Schaeffer said the novel 'has the quality of a fairy tale ... a paradigm of life as a Manichean conflict between good and evil'."

Willard moved to Poughkeepsie, New York in 1964 and married Eric Lindbloom. In 1965 she became first a professor at Vassar College and later a lecturer, giving up her tenure to focus on writing. She retired from Vassar in 2013.

== Anatole trilogy ==
All three volumes of Anatole stories were published by Harcourt Brace Jovanovich with illustrations by David McPhail. A collected reissue will be published by New York Review Books’ YA imprint NYRB Kids in November 2018.

- Sailing to Cythera, and other Anatole Stories (1974)
- The Island of the Grass King: The Further Adventures of Anatole (1979)
- Uncle Terrible: More Adventures of Anatole (1982)

== A Visit to William Blake's Inn ==
A Visit to William Blake's Inn, illustrated by Alice and Martin Provensen, was published by Harcourt Brace in 1981. The text is a collection of poems with prose introduction and epilogue, all by Willard. (Note: All fifteen poems in A Visit to William Blake's Inn were written by Willard for the book. One of them, "Two Sunflowers Move into the Yellow Room", has been attributed to Blake many times and analysed as his work occasionally, especially since 2001 when the error has proliferated online.) It features a child's overnight stay at "William Blake's Inn", inhabited by Blake and several wonderful creatures.

Willard won the Newbery Medal for the work and the Provensens were one runner-up for the Caldecott Medal. The two annual awards by professional children's librarians recognize the year's "most distinguished contribution to American children's literature" and "most distinguished American picture book for children".

== Awards ==
The first two books of the Anatole trilogy were named to the Lewis Carroll Shelf Award list in 1977 and 1979. The University of Wisconsin–Madison School of Education from 1958 to 1979 annually named several "all time" books that belong on the same shelf as Carroll's Alice in Wonderland.

- Devins Award for Poetry, 1967
- O. Henry Award, 1970
- Newbery Medal, 1982
- National Endowment for the Arts, Literature Fellowship, 1976 and 1987

== Selected works ==
=== Children's books ===
- Sailing to Cythera and other Anatole Stories (Harcourt Brace Jovanovich, 1974), illustrated by David McPhail — first in the Anatole trilogy
- The Merry History of a Christmas Pie: With a Delicious Description of a Christmas Soup (1974)
- The Snow Rabbit (1975)
- All on a May Morning (1975)
- The Well-Mannered Balloon (1976)
- Shoes Without Leather (1976)
- Simple Pictures Are Best (1977)
- Strangers' Bread (1977)
- The Highest Hit (1978)
- The Island of the Grass King: The Further Adventures of Anatole (Harcourt, 1979), ill. David McPhail — second in the Anatole trilogy
- Papa's Panda (1979)
- The Marzipan Moon (1981)
- A Visit to William Blake's Inn: Poems for Innocent and Experienced Travelers (Harcourt, 1981), illustrated by Alice and Martin Provensen — winner of the Newbery Medal and runner-up for the Caldecott Medal
- Uncle Terrible: More Adventures of Anatole (Harcourt, 1982), ill. David McPhail — third in the Anatole trilogy
- The Nightgown of the Sullen Moon (1983)
- Night Story (1986)
- The Voyage of the Ludgate Hill: Travels with Robert Louis Stevenson (1987)
- The Mountains of Quilt (1987)
- Firebrat (1988)
- East of the Sun and West of the Moon: A Play (1989)
- Ballad of Biddy Early (1989)
- The High Rise Glorious Skittle Skat Roarious Sky Pie Angel Food Cake (1990)
- Pish, Posh Said Hieronymus Bosch (1991) (Illustrated by Leo and Diane Dillon)
- Beauty and the Beast (1992) (Illustrated by Barry Moser)
- The Sorcerer's Apprentice (1993) (Illustrated by Leo and Diane Dillon)
- A Starlit Somersault Downhill (1993)
- An Alphabet of Angels, (1994, also illus.)
- Gutenberg's Gift (1995)
- The Good-Night Blessing Book, (1996, also illus.)
- Cracked Corn and Snow Ice Cream: A Family Almanac (1997)
- The Magic Cornfield, (1997, also illus.)
- The Tortilla Cat (1998)
- The Tale I Told Sasha (1999)
- Shadow Story (1999)
- The Moon & Riddles Diner and the Sunnyside Café (2001)
- Cinderella's Dress (2003)
- The Mouse, the Cat, and Grandmother's Hat (2003)
- The Tale of Paradise Lost: Based on the Poem by John Milton (2004)
- Sweep Dreams (2005), illustrated by Mary GrandPré
- The Flying Bed (2007)
- A Starlit Snowfall (2011)
- The Three Mouths of Little Tom Drum (2015)
- Gum (2017)

=== Poetry ===
- In His Country (1966)
- Skin of Grace (1967)
- A New Herball (1968)
- 19 Masks for the Naked Poet (1971)
- Carpenter of the Sun (1974)
- Household Tales of Moon and Water (1987)
- Water Walker (1989)
- Poem Made of Water (Brighton Press, 1992)
- Among Angels with Jane Yolen (1995)
- Swimming Lessons: New and Selected Poems (1996)
- When There Were Trees (Brighton, 1999)
- The River That Runs Two Ways (Brighton, 2000) - photographs by Eric Lindbloom
- Swimming Lessons, special edition (Brighton, 2001)
- In the Salt Marsh (2004)
- Diana in Sight (Brighton, 2009) — photographs by Eric Lindbloom with poems by Willard
- The Sea at Truro (2012)
- Waves (Brighton, 2014), poems and works by three artists
- Skin of Grace, special edition {Brighton, 2016}

=== Fiction ===
- The Lively Anatomy of God: Stories (1968)
- Childhood of the Magician (1973)
- Things Invisible to See (1985)
- Sister Water (1993)

=== Nonfiction ===
- "Testimony of the Invisible Man" (1970) - essays
- "Angel in the Parlor: Essays and Stories" (1983) - essays
- "Telling Time: Angels, Ancestors, And Stories" (1993) - essays
- "The Left-handed Story: Writing and the Writer's Life" (2008) — essays

=== Selections ===
- "A Nancy Willard Reader" (1991) - poetry and prose
