= The Important Book =

1949 picture book by Margaret Wise Brown

- First edition
- Author: Margaret Wise Brown
- Illustrator: Leonard Weisgard
- Language: English
- Genre: Children's literature
- Publisher: Harper & Brothers
- Publication date: 1949
- Publication place: United States
- Media type: Print
- Pages: 24
- ISBN: 978-0064432276

The Important Book is a 1949 children's picture book written by American author Margaret Wise Brown and illustrated by Leonard Weisgard. The book describes various common entities and describes some of their major attributes in brief poetic passages, beginning and ending with what Brown considers the key attribute:

The important thing about rain is
that it is wet.
It falls out of the sky,
and it sounds like rain,
and makes things shiny,
and it does not taste like anything,
and is the color of air.
But the important thing about rain is
that it is wet.

— Margaret Wise Brown, The Important Book

== Reception ==
Kirkus Reviews wrote "A perfect book for very small children, one that will go on long after the printed word has been absorbed, for the text establishes a word game which tiny children accept with glee. The text is a series of word songs, the child's first conception of poetry, dealing simply and repetitively with each object pictured, whether grass or sky, an apple, shoes, rain, or what have you. Children go on from there, picking out the important thing about other familiar objects around."

In a retrospective review on the 75th anniversary of the book's publication, Matthew Kaplowitz wrote, "It’s shocking to realize how descriptive these passages are, profound from the perspective of an adult, and innocently natural to the way a child interprets their surroundings. There’s a naivety to the language, yet these simple summaries create perfect visualizations of a personal experience rather than what the story dictates you should think about. Brown doesn’t clutter the reader with fancy wordplay, but wants them to open their minds to their own memories that each page brings them."

Mark Frauenfelder, calling the book Brown's magnum opus, described it as "true poetry about perceiving the world around us" that "rekindles the sense of wonder we were born with". The book has remained in print since its initial publication, and is frequently used in early writing education since the simple pattern is easy for young children to mimic; Crista Boske and Autumn Tooms further attributed the book's popularity in education to "the value of working with a book that overtly invites the reader to think for themselves in the midst of learning the concrete and abstract simultaneously"

The American National Education Association listed the book at #92 in its "Teachers' Top 100 Books for Children" list, compiled in 2007.
