= My World (book) =

1949 picture book by Margaret Wise Brown

My World: A Companion to Goodnight Moon
- The cover of the book. Artwork by Clement Hurd
- Author: Margaret Wise Brown
- Illustrator: Clement Hurd
- Cover artist: Clement Hurd
- Language: English
- Genre: Children's literature
- Publisher: Harper & Brothers
- Publication date: Dec. 1949
- Publication place: United States
- Pages: 36
- ISBN: 0-06-024798-3
- Preceded by: Goodnight Moon
- Followed by: N/A

My World: A Companion To Goodnight Moon is an American children's picture book written by Margaret Wise Brown and illustrated by Clement Hurd. The third book in Brown and Hurd's "classic series" (or "Runaway Bunny" series), it is the "companion" to Brown & Hurd's Goodnight Moon. My World was published in December 1949.

== Publication history ==
My World was published in 1949, just two years after Goodnight Moon. It is dedicated to Clement Hurd's son, Thacher Hurd, who was born shortly before the book was published.

My World was out of print by the 1970s, with some speculating that one scene showing the mother, father, and child sharing the bathroom may have been scandalous for that time period. In 2001, HarperFestival republished the book, recolored by Thacher Hurd.

In addition to multiple octavo and duodecimo paperback editions, My World is available in a board book edition, a book whose pages are actually stiff cardboard to make it suitable to give to a very young child.

My World, The Runaway Bunny, and Goodnight Moon have been published together as a collection titled Over the Moon.

== Synopsis ==
My World features what appears to be the same rabbit child from its predecessor, but the bunny's consciousness now expands in scope beyond the green bedroom to a wide world. The child's understanding of the world exists in relation to his parents: "My slippers. / My pajamas. / Daddy's pajamas," and "Mother's chair. / My chair. / A low chair. / A high chair. / But certainly my chair." The child engages in various activities in parallel to his parents: brushing his teeth, playing with his toy car, etc. The book ends with his parents sitting nearby as the rabbit child swings from a tree branch, thinking "Your world. / My world. / I can swing / Right over the world."

As with Goodnight Moon, Brown's text is minimal, with a dreamlike quality and a narrative that conforms to a child's sense of logic. The artwork is composed of alternating spreads, mostly black-and-white with occasional color spreads.

== Reception ==
Upon its release in 1949, the New York Times wrote of the book,

My World is for the very youngest readers, onlookers, and listeners of 2 to 4, who will recognize in the snug bunny home many of those first objects they are learning to call by name. ... [T]he book does furnish a pleasant mnemonic device while interest lasts, and there are cozy pictures by Clement Hurd full of familiar, recognizable details to help give a small child a comfortable sense of belonging.

Publishers Weekly wrote of the re-issued edition, "The volume's words and pictures stretch the boundaries of its time-honored predecessor, affirming that there is, indeed, a warm and welcoming world beyond the great green room."

Hillary Williamson of BookLoons wrote that although, "the author's poetic style and the illustrator's familiar scenes convey the same charm and subtle comfort as the original," My World lacked "... the focus of ... Goodnight Moon."

In Claudia Pearson's Have a Carrot: Oedipal Theory and Symbolism in Margaret Wise Brown's Runaway Bunny Trilogy, the author posits that "My World ... explores the bunny-boy's competitive approach to the father he simultaneously resents, admires and loves, while the mother rabbit slips from prominence in his life and into the shadows."
