= Shadow (Brown book) =

1982 children's picture book by Marcia Brown

- Author: Blaise Cendrars
- Translator: Marcia Brown
- Illustrator: Marcia Brown
- Genre: Children's picture book
- Publisher: Charles Scribner's Sons
- Publication date: 1982
- Publication place: United States
- Media type: Print (hardcover)
- Pages: 40
- ISBN: 0684172267
- LC Class: PQ2605.E55 F4713 1982

Shadow is a children's picture book created by Marcia Brown and published by Scribner in 1982. The text is Brown's translation of the poem La Féticheuse by French writer Blaise Cendrars.

Brown won the annual Caldecott Medal for illustration of an American children's picture book in 1983, her third. The book was also a finalist for the National Book Award for Young People's Literature in the hardcover picture book category.

Awards
| Preceded by Jumanji | Caldecott Medal recipient 1983 | Succeeded by The Glorious Flight |
