= Vladimir Bobri =

Ukrainian-American artist

- Bobri with guitar in 1950
- Born: Volodymyr Bobritskiy; May 13, 1898; Kharkiv, Russian Empire
- Died: November 3, 1986 (aged 88); Rosendale, New York, U.S.
- Known for: Illustration; Music history Classical guitar

Vladimir Bobri (Ukrainian: Володимир Бобрі), born Volodymyr Bobritskiy (Ukrainian: Володимир Бобрицький, romanized: Volodymyr Bobrytskyi; May 13, 1898 – November 3, 1986), was an American-Ukrainian illustrator, writer, composer, educator and guitar historian. Celebrated for his prolific and innovative graphic design work in New York since the mid-1920s, Bobri was also a founder of the New York Society of The Classic Guitar in 1936, and served as editor and art director of its magazine, Guitar Review, for nearly 40 years.

== Early life and education ==
Born in Kharkiv, Russian Empire (now Ukraine) on May 13, 1898, Vladimir Bobritsky studied at the rigorous Kharkiv Imperial Art School. By 1915 he had begun designing sets for the Great Dramatic Theatre of Kharkiv, introducing the methods of theatrical designer Gordon Craig. Swept up in the Russian Revolution, Bobritsky fought on various sides in the civil war before managing to escape in 1917.

"After the Revolution came a long and enforced period of travel and a kind of montage of activity," wrote Bobritsky's friend and fellow artist Saul Yalkert in a biographical sketch printed in Forty Illustrators and How They Work (1946):

As a refugee he traveled on a handmade passport, eight closely printed pages in Polish, so skillfully wrought that it left no doubt as to his talent and feeling for calligraphy, since it successfully passed the expert examination of the English, French, Italian and Greek consular authorities. ... In the mountainous, peninsular Crimea he worked as a wine presser for the Tartar fruit and wine growers. Later he came in contact with Russian, Hungarian and Spanish gypsies, studied their lore, the peculiarities of the different tribes. Having met with a band of gypsies in the Crimea he earned his way as a guitar player in their chorus.

Bobritsky painted icons in the Greek islands, played the piano in a nickelodeon in Pera, painted signs in Constantinople (now Istanbul), discovered an important Byzantine mural in an abandoned Turkish mosque, and earned his passage to America by designing sets and costumes for the Russian ballet in Constantinople.

"Through all those wanderings his knapsack always had a watercolor box, a drawing pad," Yalkert wrote. "The record was kept with constant sketching of people, stories, folklore, folk music and crafts."

== Career ==
Bobritsky emigrated to the United States in 1921.

In his artist profile in Forty Illustrators and How They Work, Ernest W. Watson reports that Bobritsky began operating his own textile printing establishment soon after arriving in New York. "In 1925 he was called in by the art director of Wanamaker's, in an experiment with modern advertising," Watson wrote. "His radically different newspaper layouts were more than the establishment could stomach and both artist and art director were dismissed. But Saks Fifth Avenue saw, admired and beckoned." Saks offered Bobri the position of art director.

"His newspaper and magazine layouts represented a fresh departure," wrote Walt Reed, scholar and historian of illustration art. "Bobri soon found himself with enough clients to embark on a freelance career, largely for advertising illustrations, and strongly influenced by his background of classical training and theatrical designing."

The first of Bobritsky's seven covers for The New Yorker magazine was dated February 6, 1926. By the 1930s, Bobritsky — or Bobri, as he signed his name with greater frequency — had become a leading illustrator in the burgeoning world of advertising. His accounts included Hanes, Koret and Avon; his work was prominent in the Annual of Advertising Art. He also gained renown as an illustrator of children's books.

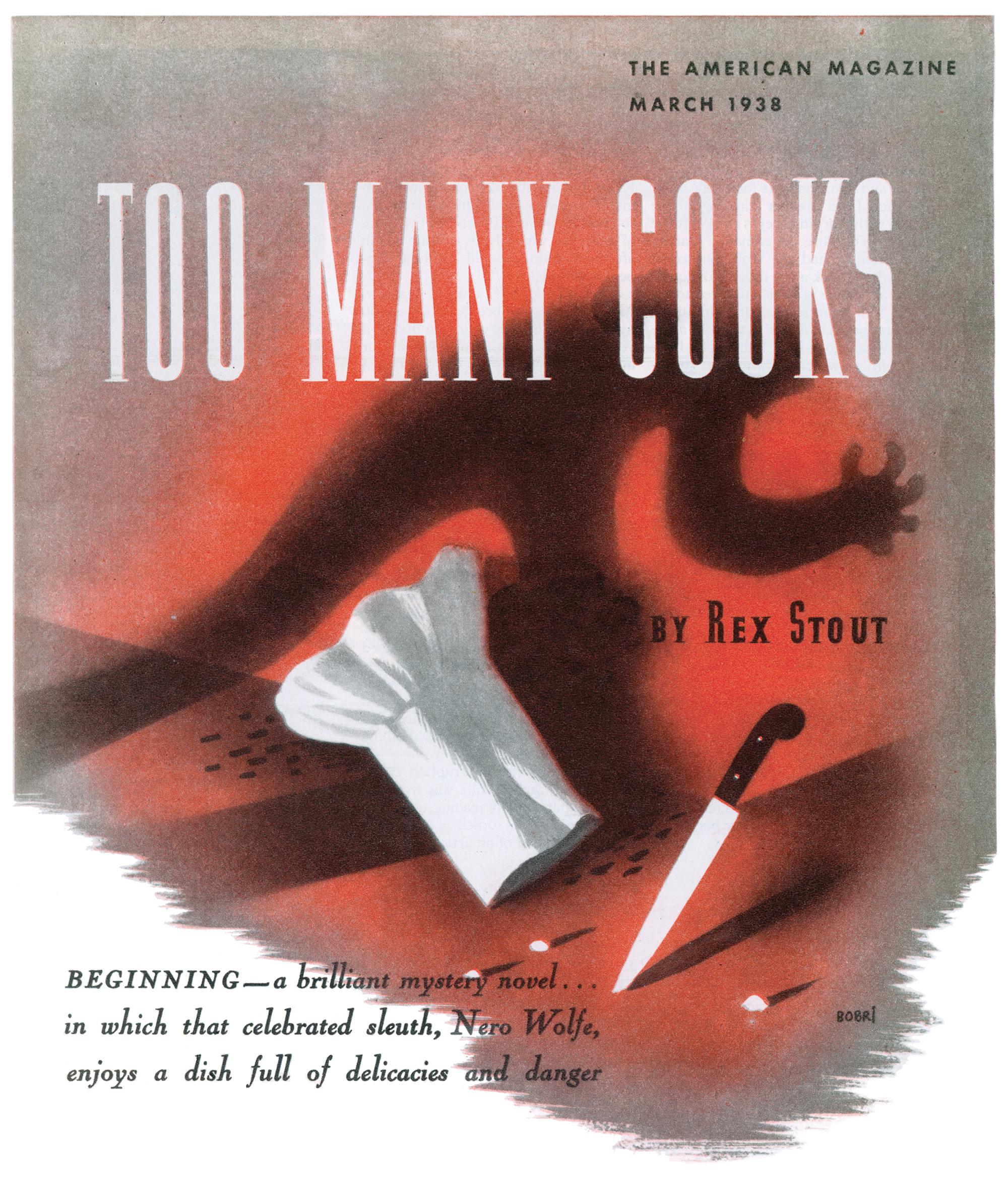
Bobri created the title illustration for Too Many Cooks, a Nero Wolfe mystery serialized in six issues of The American Magazine beginning in March 1938

Bobri frequently contributed to Vogue, Harper's Bazaar, McCall's and many other magazines. As well as appearing in the March 1938 issue of The American Magazine, Bobri's title illustration for Too Many Cooks, a Nero Wolfe mystery by Rex Stout, adorns a recipe box that is one of the most sought-after pieces of Stoutiana.

Bobri continued his study of the guitar. In 1936, he and a small group began meeting informally, forming the first major classical guitar society in New York City, the New York Society of the Classic Guitar.

"The Society's beginnings were somewhat modest, but Bobri, through a seemingly small act, would ensure the Society's preeminence for decades to come," wrote Lester S. Long in NYlon Review, the official newsletter of the New York City Classical Guitar Society:

An illustrator by trade, Bobri presented Andrés Segovia with an offer to paint his portrait. Segovia accepted. In the process the pair began a decade-long friendship and Segovia accepted the position of honorary president of the Society. Already a star in Europe and starting his career in the United States, Segovia would be no mere figurehead; instead, he would influence the artistic direction of the Society for nearly 50 years as chairman of the advisory committee.

In 1946, the society began publishing The Guitar Review. Bobri served as editor and art director of the quarterly magazine until 1985.

As well as designing a number of album covers for Segovia recordings, Bobri wrote and illustrated the influential book, The Segovia Technique (1972).

In 1972, Bobri was decorated with the Cross of Isabel la Catolica with the rank of Knight-Commander, recognizing his lifelong achievements as a designer, painter, art director, composer, and writer, and his use of those talents to increase awareness of Spanish culture. The award was presented by the consul general of Spain in New York, at a ceremony attended by Spanish dignitaries including Andrés Segovia.

== Personal life and death ==
On November 3, 1986, Vladimir Bobri lost his life in a house fire in Rosendale, New York, one that consumed the house he designed, built and lived in with his second wife, Margaret Rinaudo Garcia, for nearly 50 years, together with his art, correspondence and collection of guitars. Introducing a memorial tribute in its Winter 1987 issue, The Guitar Review wrote, "In the midst of our inability to accept so great a loss, we are seduced by a possible validity in the old Viking philosophy: the belief that the helmsman and his pyre are sent resurrected into the unknown, to sail the sea of eternity. May we hope it's true that our dear friend Bobri has indeed embarked on that mythical journey, still in possession of all he took with him."

== Archival collection ==
While most of Bobri's possessions were destroyed in the fire that took his life, a small archive of photographs from his trip to Spain in 1971 and 1972 when he visited his friend Andrés Segovia are preserved in Special Collections and Archives at the University Library at California State University, Northridge as part of the International Guitar Research Archive.

== Bibliography ==
=== Author ===
- 1967 130 Daily Studies for the classic guitar (Franco Colombo, Inc.)
- 1972 The Segovia Technique (Macmillan Publishing Company, Hardcover; 1990, The Bold Strummer, Paperback ISBN 978-0-933224-49-0)
- 1972 Two Guitars - a galaxy of duets for guitar; 88 songs and dances from 47 countries (with Carl Miller)(Collier Books, Paperback)
- 1972 Complete Study of Tremolo for the Classic Guitar (Franco Colombo Publications, Belwin-Mills Publishing Corp.)
- 1974 A Musical Voyage with Two Guitars: 64 Duets from 34 Countries (with Carl Miller)
- 1985 Complete Study of Tremolo for the Classic Guitar (Alfred Publishing Company, Paperback ISBN 978-0-7692-1295-1)

=== Illustrator ===
- 1929 The Crimson Circle by Edgar Wallace (The Crime Club, Doubleday, Doran and Company, Garden City, New York, hardcover; dust jacket design)
- 1929 The Face in the Night by Edgar Wallace (The Crime Club, Doubleday, Doran and Company, Garden City, New York, hardcover; dust jacket design)
- 1930 The Day the World Ended by Sax Rohmer (The Crime Club, Doubleday, Doran and Company, Garden City, New York, hardcover; dust jacket design)
- 1931 The Law of the Three Just Men by Edgar Wallace (The Crime Club, Doubleday, Doran and Company, Garden City, New York, hardcover; dust jacket design)
- 1932 Philippine by Maurice Bedel (E. P. Dutton and Company, New York, hardcover; dust jacket design)
- 1937 Five Proud Riders by Ann Stafford
- 1938 The House at Cherry Hill by Mary H. Weik
- 1953 Paris Cuisine by James A. Beard and Alexander Watt
- 1953 Let's Talk About God by Dorothy K. Kripke
- 1955 Let's Talk About Right and Wrong by Dorothy K. Kripke
- 1957 Let's Talk About Judaism by Dorothy K. Kripke
- 1957 The March Wind by Inez Rice
- 1958 Sleepy Book by Charlotte Zolotow
- 1958 The Whiskers of Ho Ho by William Littlefield
- 1961 What Is Red? by Suzanne Gottlieb
- 1963 What the Moon Is Like by Franklyn M. Branley
- 1964 Boris and His Balalaika by Esphyr Slobodkina
- 1964 Icebergs by Roma Gans
- 1969 A Kiss Is Round by Blossom Budney
