= A Starlit Somersault Downhill =

1993 book by Nancy Willard

- Author: Nancy Willard
- Illustrator: Jerry Pinkney
- Language: English
- Genre: Children's literature, Children's poetry, picture book
- Published: 1993 (Little, Brown and Company)
- Publication place: USA
- Media type: Print (hardback)
- Pages: 32 (unpaginated)
- ISBN: 9780316941136
- OCLC: 24010468
- Calligraphy by Barbara Bash

A Starlit Somersault Downhill is a 1993 book by Nancy Willard and illustrator Jerry Pinkney about a rabbit that is invited by a bear to share a cave over winter but instead of hibernating decides to enjoy the outside.

== Publication history ==
1993 A Starlit Somersault Downhill, (Little, Brown and Company)
2011 A Starlit Snowfall, (Little, Brown and Company)

== Reception ==
Publishers Weekly, in a review of A Starlit Somersault Downhill, wrote "Willard's typically sophisticated language gains meaning through repeated readings, and her sonorous rhyming couplets impart liveliness to nature's sleeping season. Lavishly detailed, full-spread watercolors afford views of untidy woods and tousled fur--they bristle with energy even as they suggest the restlessness youngsters may experience in the deep of night, wide awake and alone."

A Starlit Somersault Downhill has also been reviewed by Booklist, Kirkus Reviews, The Horn Book Magazine, School Library Journal, and the Cooperative Children's Book Center.
