= The Glorious Flight =

1983 picture book by Alice and Martin Provensen

The Glorious Flight: Across the Channel with Louis Blériot
- The Glorious Flight: Across the Channel with Louis Blériot
- Author: Alice and Martin Provensen
- Illustrator: Alice and Martin Provensen
- Cover artist: Provensen
- Genre: Children's picture book
- Publisher: Viking Press
- Publication date: 1983
- Publication place: United States
- ISBN: 978-0-670-34259-4
- OCLC: 8430315
- Dewey Decimal: 629.13/092/4 B 19
- LC Class: TL721.B5 P76 1983

The Glorious Flight: Across the Channel with Louis Blériot is a children's picture book written by Alice and Martin Provensen. The book is a biography of the French aviator Louis Blériot, who built the Blériot XI and flew it across the English Channel in 1909.

Released by Viking Press, in 1983, it was the recipient of the Caldecott Medal for illustration in 1984.

Awards
Preceded by Shadow	Caldecott Medal recipient 1984	Succeeded by Saint George and the Dragon
