= Caps for Sale =

1940 children's picture book by Esphyr Slobodkina

- The cover of a late edition of Caps for Sale.
- Author: Esphyr Slobodkina
- Illustrator: Esphyr Slobodkina
- Cover artist: Esphyr Slobodkina
- Language: English
- Genre: Children's literature
- Publisher: W. R. Scott
- Publication date: 1940
- Publication place: United States
- Media type: Print
- Pages: 48
- ISBN: 978-0064431439
- OCLC: 13008528
- Website: capsforsale.org

Caps for Sale is a children's picture book, written and illustrated by Esphyr Slobodkina and published by W. R. Scott in 1940.

== Summary ==
Based on a folktale, the story follows a mustachioed cap-selling peddler (unnamed in the book, he is known as Pezzo in the sequel, Circus Caps for Sale) who wears his entire stock of caps on his head. When the peddler goes to sleep under a tree, a troop of monkeys steal all the caps, except his own checked cap, and put them on. The peddler tries in vain to get the monkeys to return the caps (first shaking his pointer finger, then shaking both of his hands, then stamping one of his feet, and finally stamping both feet), but they only imitate his actions. Finally, he waves his own cap in the air, throws it on the ground in disgust and walks away, causing the monkeys to do the same. The peddler then collects all the caps off the ground and goes on his way.

== Popularity ==
It is Slobodkina's best-known work, and has sold more than two million copies. Caps for Sale is a popular read-aloud book, because its repetitive text permits children to speak the lines and thus join in the reading experience.

It won a Lewis Carroll Shelf Award in 1958.

== History ==
The earliest known account of the story may be found in The Wilmington Centinel, published in Wilmington, North Carolina on January 8, 1789:

According to the following relation from a person just returned from the Labrador coast, the imitative faculty in monkeys seems to exceed every thing short of human — A sailor having a number of red woolen caps and care to dispose of among the natives, went on shore for that purpose; his way to a settlement lying through a woods very copiously inhabited by the species mentioned above, and it being midday, put a cap on his head, and laying the others by his side, he determined upon a little repose under the shade of a plantain tree. To his utter astonishment, when he awoke, from the specimen he had given his imitative observers of the use of his caps, he beheld a number of them upon the heads of the monkeys on the trees, round about him, while the wearers were chattering in an unusual manner. Finding every attempt to regain them fruitless, he at length in a fit of rage and disappointment, and under the supposition the one he retained was not worth taking away, pulled the same from his head, and throwing it upon the ground exclaimed — "here d--n you, take it among ye", which he had no sooner done, than to his great surprise, the observant monkeys did the same, by which means he regained the greatest part of his property.

== Sequels ==
Slobodkina published a sequel, Pezzo the Peddler and the Circus Elephant, in 1967, twenty-seven years after the publication of Caps for Sale. It was reissued in 2002, after Slobodkina's death, as Circus Caps for Sale. A direct sequel bringing back the monkeys, More Caps for Sale, was published in 2015, credited jointly to Slobodkina and her long-time personal assistant Ann Marie Mulhearn Sayer. This was followed by Caps for Sale and the Mindful Monkeys in 2017. The illustrations for the latter two books were created by scanning and editing images from Slobodkina's original artwork.

== Other media ==
Caps for Sale was included as one of five stories on the 1986 VHS release Five Stories for the Very Young from Weston Woods Studios, animated using illustrations from the book. A remake was released on Weston Woods's 2007 collection Picture Book Classics on DVD, narrated by Rex Robbins.

Caps for Sale was read periodically on Captain Kangaroo.

== See also ==
- Monkey see, monkey do
