= Garth Williams =

American children's book illustrator (1912–1996)

- An undated photo of Garth Williams.
- Born: April 16, 1912; New York City, U.S.
- Died: May 8, 1996 (aged 84); Marfil near Guanajuato, Mexico
- Education: Westminster School of Art, Royal College of Art, British School at Rome
- Known for: Illustrating children's books
- Notable work: Illustrations for Charlotte's Web and Stuart Little by E. B. White; Illustrations for The Cricket in Times Square by George Selden; illustrations for the Little House series by Laura Ingalls Wilder
- Style: Line drawing
- Awards: British Prix de Rome

Garth Montgomery Williams (April 16, 1912 – May 8, 1996) was an American artist who came to prominence in the American postwar era as an illustrator of children's books. Many of the books he illustrated have become classics of American children's literature.

In Stuart Little, Charlotte's Web, and in the Little House series of books of Laura Ingalls Wilder, Williams['s] drawings have become inseparable from how we think of those stories. In that respect ... Williams['s] work belongs in the same class as Sir John Tenniel's drawings for Alice in Wonderland, or Ernest Shepard's illustrations for Winnie the Pooh.

His friendly, fuzzy baby animals populated a dozen Little Golden Books.

Mel Gussow in The New York Times wrote, "He believed that books 'given, or read, to children can have a profound influence!' For that reason, he said, he used his illustrations to try to 'awaken something of importance ... humor, responsibility, respect for others, interest in the world at large!'"

== Early life ==
Born in New York City in 1912, he was the son of Hamilton Williams and Florence Stuart Davis. Williams's father was a cartoonist for Punch and his mother was a landscape painter. He described them by saying, "Everybody in my home was always either painting or drawing." He grew up on farms in New Jersey and Canada until the family relocated to the United Kingdom in 1922, where his parents were from.

Williams studied architecture there, and worked for a time as an architect's assistant. When the Great Depression came, he made up his mind to be an artist instead of an architect. He began his studies at Westminster School of Art in 1929 and, in 1931, was awarded a four-year scholarship to the Royal College of Art where he created a sculpture that was awarded the British Prix de Rome. He continued his education at the British School at Rome in Germany and Italy, until the outbreak of World War II in Europe.

In London, he volunteered with the British Red Cross Civilian Defense ambulances, and helped collect the dead and injured from the streets. After a bomb blast vaporized a friend who had been walking next to him, he sent his wife and daughter to Canada, and reunited with them in New York in 1942.

== Career ==
An illustration from Charlotte's Web showing Williams' energetic line, his penchant for detail, emotion and action, as well as his use of texture and shading.

In the United States, Williams worked making lenses at a war plant, applied for work as a camouflage artist, contributed war-effort posters to the British-American Art Center in New York, and brought his portfolio around to the major publishing houses. He drew for The New Yorker for a mutually unfulfilling period of time. Then, in 1945, he received his first commission as an illustrator, from editor Ursula Nordstrom of Harper's Department of Books for Boys and Girls. The story is that Nordstrom "told him she was expecting a manuscript that he might illustrate. By coincidence, when the manuscript arrived the author had pinned a note to it: 'Try Garth Williams'. The author was E. B. White; the book was Stuart Little." The Whites had wanted Robert Lawson to work on the project, but had burned through eight illustrators. The book became a success with adults as well as children. Williams later said that seeing grownups on buses and trains reading Stuart Little persuaded him to continue as a freelance illustrator.

Soon after, he began collaborating with Margaret Wise Brown with The Little Fur Family, Harper's answer to Simon & Schuster's Pat the Bunny. Nordstrom knew that the book would be a success when a mother wrote to tell her that her little boy had held open his copy at the dinner table, and tried to feed it his supper. In all, Williams illustrated eleven of Brown's books.

In 1951 he illustrated Charlotte's Web (1952); his eldest child Fiona, who was a toddler when the family escaped the Blitz, was his model for Fern Arable.

In the latter part of his life, Williams lived primarily in Marfil, a small town west of Guanajuato, Mexico. He was part of a colony of expatriates who built or rebuilt homes in the ruins of the silver mines of colonial Mexico. At 81, he estimated that he had illustrated 97 books.

=== Little House illustrations (1953) ===
Williams received the commission to illustrate the new Little House edition in about 1947. To know the worlds of Laura's childhood, Williams, who had never been west of the Hudson River, traveled the American Midwest to the places the Ingalls family had lived 70 years before, photographing and sketching landscapes, trees, birds and wildlife, buildings and towns.

The trip culminated in a search along the riverbank along Plum Creek where the family had once built their dugout home. Williams writes, in his 1953 account "I did not expect to find the house, but I felt certain that it would have left an indentation in the bank. A light rain did not help my search, and I was about to give up when ahead of me I saw exactly what I was looking for, a hollow in the east bank of Plum Creek. I felt very well rewarded, for the scene fitted Mrs Wilder's description perfectly...." [He] wanted to ... be able to see the house on Plum Creek ... as Laura would have done, as a happy, flower bedecked refuge from the elements, with the music of the nearby stream. Which is how he drew it.

Ursula Nordstrom's initial plan was for Williams to produce eight oil paintings for each book, sixty-four in all. This proved to be not cost-efficient. Williams illustrated the Little House books with a simple pencil, charcoal, and ink. Much of his work was accomplished in Italy.

Williams later illustrated the first edition of The First Four Years (1971), which is commonly considered the last of nine books in the Little House series.

=== The Rabbits' Wedding controversy (1958) ===
In 1958, Garth Williams wrote and illustrated a picture book that caused a small uproar: The Rabbits' Wedding. Aimed at children aged 3 to 7, it depicted animals in a moonlit forest attending the wedding of a white rabbit to a black rabbit. In 1959, Alabama Senator E. O. Eddins and Alabama State Library Agency director Emily Wheelock Reed took the lead in a controversy over the book. Senator Eddins, with the support of the White Citizens' Council and other segregationists, demanded that it be removed from all Alabama libraries because of its perceived themes of racial integration and interracial marriage. Reed reviewed the book and, finding no objectionable content, determined it was her ethical duty to defend the book against an outright ban. A battle ensued between Reed and her supporters, and the segregationist faction in the legislature. In the end, the book was not banned outright, but rather placed on special reserve shelves in the state library agency-run facilities. Libraries that had purchased their own copies were not required to make this change.

About the controversy, Williams stated, "I was completely unaware that animals with white fur, such as white polar bears and white dogs and white rabbits, were considered blood relations of white human beings. I was only aware that a white horse next to a black horse looks very picturesque." Williams said his story was not written for adults, who "will not understand it, because it is only about a soft furry love and has no hidden message of hate".

== Personal life ==
Williams was married four times. The first three marriages ended in divorce; he remained in his fourth marriage until his death. He had five daughters: Fiona and Bettina from his first marriage; Jessica and Estyn from his second; Dilys from his fourth; and a son, Dylan, from his third marriage.

He met his first two wives while living in England. His first wife was Gunda Lambton (née von Davidson) a German artist and writer with whom he had two daughters. His second wife Dorothea (née Dessauer), formerly his children's nanny, was an Austrian Jewish artist whose affluent parents died in the Holocaust. He and Dorothea also had two daughters. A few years after their eventual divorce she died of a drug overdose.

Williams met his third and fourth wives while living in Mexico. Four months after his second divorce in 1962, he married Alicia Rayas, his nineteen-year-old Mexican housekeeper. Several years later they had a son. His last marriage was to Leticia Vargas Arredondo, from a prominent family in Guanajuato. He and Leticia had a daughter together when he was sixty-six years old. His youngest daughter was 17 when Williams died.

At 84 Williams died at his home in Marfil, and was buried in Aspen, Colorado.

For the last 40 years of his life Williams divided most of his time between a restored hacienda in Guanajuato and in his home in San Antonio, Texas.

== Techniques ==
In a 1999 interview, Williams described his approach to illustrating stories by other writers. His initial reading of the material usually would suggest thirty or forty potential pictures. "To compose the pictures is very hard ... I look for all the action in the story; then I arrange forms and color. I always try to imagine what the author is seeing. Of course, I have to narrow down my ideas to the number of drawings I'm allowed, which might be as few as ten per book. I make a list of illustrations. When I see a picture, I write down the idea and a page number while I read the manuscript."

Williams drew few straight lines. He used charcoal and graphite pencils, from fine to very soft, to illustrate the Little House books. The "youngest" book in the series, Little House in the Big Woods, is nearly lamplit in its coziness, almost an echo of the small-animal sensibilities of The Fur Family or his deeply colored Little Golden Books. He used pen and ink for The Cricket in Times Square, the Rescuers books, Charlotte's Web, and Stuart Little. The Giant Golden Book of Elves and Fairies, a 1951 anthology, is noteworthy for Williams' extensive use of colored pencil. In the Golden Books and Little Golden Books, he favored oil pastels, ink washes, and watercolor. The Rabbits' Wedding (1958), which employed a limited palette of only a few delicate colors, contained some of the best-reproduced examples of his ability to convey hair, hide, grass, and fur textures.

== Published books ==
=== As writer and illustrator ===
- (1946). The Chicken Book: A Traditional Rhyme. New York: Delacorte. ISBN 0-440-40600-5.
- (1951). Adventures of Benjamin Pink. New York: Harper.
- (1952). Baby Animals. New York: Simon & Schuster.
- (1953). Baby Farm Animals. New York: Simon & Schuster.
- (1954). The Golden Animal ABC. New York: Simon & Schuster (republished as Animal ABC, Golden Press (1957); My Big Animal ABC, Golden Pleasure Books, London (1957); Bunnies' ABC, Western Publishing, Racine, Wisconsin (1985)).
- (1955). Baby's First Book. New York: Simon & Schuster.
- (1958). The Rabbits' Wedding. New York: Harper. ISBN 0-06-026495-0.
- (1986). Self-Portrait. Reading, Mass.: Addison-Wesley Publishing Co. ISBN 0-201-08314-0.

=== With other writers ===
- Andrieux, Raymond (1945). Tux'n'Tails. New York: Vanguard.
- Baylor, Byrd. (1963). Amigo.
- Brown, Margaret Wise. (1946). Little Fur Family. New York: Harper.
- Brown, Margaret Wise (1948). Wait 'til the Moon Is Full.
- Brown, Margaret Wise (1951). Fox Eyes.
- Brown, Margaret Wise (1952). Mister Dog: The Dog Who Belonged to Himself.
- Brown, Margaret Wise (1953). The Sailor Dog.
- Brown, Margaret Wise (1954). The Friendly Book.
- Brown, Margaret Wise (1956). Home for a Bunny.
- Brown, Margaret Wise (1956, Harper). Three Little Animals.
- Kunhardt, Dorothy. (1949). Tiny Nonsense Stories. New York: Simon and Schuster.
- Kunhardt, Dorothy (1949). Happy Valentine.
- Kunhardt, Dorothy (1949). Mrs. Sheep's Little Lamb.
- Kunhardt, Dorothy (1949). The Two Snow Bulls.
- Kunhardt, Dorothy (1949). Roger Mouse's Wish.
- Kunhardt, Dorothy (1949). The Wonderful Silly Picnic.
- Kunhardt, Dorothy (1949). The Naughty Little Guest.
- Kunhardt, Dorothy (1949). Uncle Quack.
- Kunhardt, Dorothy (1949). April Fool!
- Kunhardt, Dorothy (1949). The Cowboy Kitten.
- Kunhardt, Dorothy (1949). The Easter Bunny.
- Kunhardt, Dorothy (1948). Shame on You, Baby Whale!
- Kunhardt, Dorothy (1948). Good Housekeeping collaborations
- Carlson, Natalie Savage. The Family Under the Bridge.
- Carlson, Natalie Savage. A Happy Orpheline.
- Carlson, Natalie Savage (1959). A Brother for the Orphelines.
- Hoban, Russell Bedtime for Frances.
- Jarrell, Randall (1964) The Gingerbread Rabbit.
- Le Gallienne, Eva (1949) Flossie and Bossie
- Leader, Pauline 1946 A Room for the Night Vanguard.
- Lindquist, Jennie D (1955) The Golden Name Day.
- Lindquist, Jennie D (1959). The Little Silver House.
- Minarik, Else H. (1963). The Little Giant Girl and the Elf Boy.
- Prelutsky, Jack Ride a Purple Pelican.
- Prelutsky, Jack (1990). Beneath a Blue Umbrella.
- Moore, Lilian (1957). My First Counting Book.
- Norton, Miriam (1954). The Kitten Who Thought He Was a Mouse.
- Runyon, Damon (1946). In Our Town: Twenty Seven Slices of Life. New York: Creative Age Press.
- Selden, George New York: Farrar, Straus & Giroux.
- Selden, George (1960). The Cricket in Times Square.
- Selden, George (1981). Chester Cricket's Pigeon Ride.
- Selden, George (1983). Chester Cricket's New Home.
- Selden, George (1986). Harry Kitten and Tucker Mouse.
- Selden, George (1974). Harry Cat's Pet Puppy.
- Selden, George (1969). Tucker's Countryside.
- Selden, George (1987). The Old Meadow.
- Sharp, Margery. The Rescuers: A Fantasy.
- Sharp, Margery. Miss Bianca.
- Sharp, Margery (1966). Miss Bianca in the Salt Mines.
- Sharp, Margery (1963). The Turret.
- Stoltz, Mary. Emmet's Pig.
- Stoltz, Mary. King Emmett the Second.
- Wahl, Jan (1968). Push Kitty.
- Werner, Jane (ed.) (1950). The Tall Book of Make-Believe.
- Werner, Jane (ed.) (1951). The Giant Golden Book of Elves and Fairies.
- White, E. B. (1945). Stuart Little.
- White, E. B. (1952). Charlotte's Web.
- Wilder, Laura Ingalls (1953). The first eight Little House books. New York: Harper.
- Wilder, Laura Ingalls, with a foreword by Roger McBride (1971). The First Four Years. New York: Harper & Row.
- Zolotow, Charlotte (1957). Over and Over.
- Zolotow, Charlotte. Do You Know What I'd Do?
- Zolotow, Charlotte (1963). The Sky Was Blue.
