= The Runaway Bunny =

Children's picture book (1942)

- Author: Margaret Wise Brown
- Illustrator: Clement Hurd
- Language: English
- Genre: Children's literature
- Publisher: Harper
- Publication date: 1942
- Publication place: United States
- Media type: Print
- Pages: 48
- ISBN: 978-0-06-077582-7
- OCLC: 314185

The Runaway Bunny is a 1942 picture book written by Margaret Wise Brown and illustrated by Clement Hurd. The plot deals with a small rabbit, who wants to run away. His mother, however, tells him that "if you run away, I will run after you."

This book is the first in Brown and Hurd's "classic series," which also includes Goodnight Moon and My World. The picture of a cow jumping over the Moon, which features prominently in Goodnight Moon, first appeared in The Runaway Bunny. A copy of The Runaway Bunny appears in Goodnight Moon, as does the illustration of the mother fishing for the bunny child. The three books have been published together as a collection titled Over the Moon.

An animated special based on the book was released on HBO Max on March 25, 2021. The special is narrated by Tracee Ellis Ross.

== Synopsis ==
A little bunny tells his mother that he is going to run away, thereby becoming a fish in a "trout stream", a rock on a mountain, a crocus in a hidden garden, a bird, a sailboat, a circus acrobat, and finally a little boy, until he resigns himself to stay where he is and remain her little bunny. Mother Bunny appears as a fisherman, a mountain climber, a gardener, a tree, a cloud, a trapeze walker, and finally the mother herself.

The illustrations alternate between two-page black-and-white line images and accompanying text, and two-page painted spreads. Similar alternation of black-and-white spreads and color spreads occur in all three books in the series.

== Publication history ==
The call and response structure of Brown's text provides an emotionally compelling depiction of a small child's first burst of independence and a mother's affirmation of unconditional love.

The closing line of the book, "'Have a carrot,' said the mother bunny," was added after Ursula Nordstrom, the director of Harper's Department of Books for Boys and Girls, told Brown that the ending needed work. The line was cabled in to Harper's from Maine, where Brown was on vacation. There have been two different final illustrations for this book.

The book has been in print continuously since 1942.

== In popular culture ==
The Runaway Bunny has been adapted into a concerto for violin, reader and orchestra by the contemporary American composer Glen Roven, with text from the book.

The Runaway Bunny was referenced in season 11, episode 12 of the television show Cheers. Carla Tortelli states that she's read the book to her eight kids over a thousand times and it 'made her bawl each time.' It is also referenced in the Pulitzer Prize-winning plays, Wit and Rabbit Hole, as well as the film adaption of Wit.

The Runaway Bunny was also referenced in the Korean drama, Mother. A musical adaptation of The Runaway Bunny, by Paul Lewis (book, music, lyrics) and Gabriel Carbajal (book) had its world premiere at Boston Children's Theatre in February 2019.

The Runaway Bunny was also in season 6, episode 4 of Virgin River.
