= Parragon =

British publishing house

Parragon Books
- Parent company: Cottage Door Press
- Founded: 1988
- Founder: Guy Parr and Paul Anderson
- Country of origin: United Kingdom
- Headquarters location: Bath, England
- Distribution: Europe, North America, Asia, Australia
- Publication types: Books
- Official website: none

Parragon Books Ltd, a United Kingdom publishing company, was formed in 1988 by friends Guy Parr and Paul Anderson. In 2001, it became part of D. C. Thomson & Co.

== History ==
Parragon began its early years by developing business through overstocks and reprinting dormant titles from key publishers archives such as Penguin Books and HarperCollins.

In 1992, Parragon shifted focus through a trial bargain book table placed in Asda's grocery store in Nuneaton. Following the trial's success, Parragon extended their bargain book strategy to other key retailers such as Tesco and Woolworths. As sales increased, these retailers employed Parragon to distribute titles from other major publishers. The distribution business continued until the mid to late 1990s before Parragon decided to concentrate on their own publishing. The distribution business was offloaded to Cork International, who continued to service the grocers until 2004 before their demise.

In the late 1990s, Parragon's publishing business increased, and the company opened new offices in New York and Cologne before DC Thomson took a controlling stake in 2001. Their acquisition of Funtastic gave them significant distribution into the Australian market before further sales offices were opened in India and China, bringing the Parragon brand global.

In 2005, Parragon signed a deal with Disney to publish books into the UK book trade, hiring new staff to oversee the Disney brand license. Significant licensing activity, including brands such as Looney Tunes and Bratz followed. Parragon also expanded focus across the children's, adult reference, and cooking categories.

In 2007, Parragon launched its global cookbook imprint, 'Love Food'. Parragon has sold over 100 million Love Food books worldwide. Core series include Step by Step, 100 Best Recipes, Food Heroes as well as stand alone titles.

In 2011, Parragon renewed their existing license with Discovery Kids which included rights to publish titles in eBook format. Parragon later signed a deal for a new series of activity and novelty books for the 'Squinkies' toy brand, and a new license for a range of books based on the Power Rangers Samurai brand.

In 2012 Parragon launched its stationery imprint, Life Canvas. In February 2013, the Giftware Association 'Highly Commended' the Life Canvas 'Story of Me and My...' range of keepsake journals in the finals of the 2013 Gift of the Year Awards. Later in August 2013, Life Canvas was awarded 3 awards at the 2013 UK Stationery Awards including the 'Special Judges Award'. In 2014, Parragon published two Life Canvas collections called 'Wild' and 'Paris'.

In May 2012, Nickelodeon, Viacom Consumer Products and Parragon announced Parragon's acquisition of master publishing rights for the Nickelodeon entertainment brand portfolio.

In 2013, Parragon announced a licensing partnership with Mattel for publishing rights to their Monster High brand in the UK, North America and Germany. In 2014, Parragon acquired publishing rights for Mattel brand 'Ever After High'.

In 2017, Parragon revealed a redesign of the in-house imprint Start Little Learn Big.

In 2018, Parragon announced its closure. Cottage Door Press acquired the US and UK rights of the company.
