= Edith Thacher Hurd =

American children's writer

- Born: Edith Thacher; September 14, 1910 (Note: Some sources state Edith Thacher's date of birth to be September 13, 1910. Others, including her brother, cite September 14, 1910.); Kansas City, Missouri, U.S.
- Died: January 25, 1997 (aged 86); Walnut Creek, California, U.S.
- Education: Radcliffe College; Bank Street College of Education
- Occupation: Writer
- Spouse: Clement Hurd (m. 1939; died 1988)
- Children: John Thacher Hurd
- Writing career
- Years active: 1938–1983

Edith Thacher Hurd (September 14, 1910 – January 25, 1997) was an American writer of children's books. She published 70 books in her lifetime, fifty of them illustrated by her husband, Clement Hurd.

== Biography ==
Edith Thacher was born in Kansas City, Missouri, in 1910 to John Hamilton Thacher and Edith Gilman Thacher. She had one older brother, John Jr., and one younger brother, Nicholas, who served as the United States Ambassador to Saudi Arabia from 1970 to 1973.

She attended Radcliffe College and the Bank Street College of Education, where she first met Clement Hurd and Margaret Wise Brown. She taught for four years at New York's Dalton School, and during World War II, worked as a news analyst at the United States Office of War Information in San Francisco. Thacher and Hurd married in 1939, collaborated on over fifty books, and had a son, John Thacher Hurd, who later became a children's book writer as well. Hurd also co-wrote with Brown, under the pseudonym "Juniper Sage."

She died on January 25, 1997, in Walnut Creek, California, aged 86.

Hurd's work, as well as that of her husband and son, was featured at several museums in the traveling exhibition "From Goodnight Moon to Art Dog: The World of Clement, Edith, and Thacher Hurd."

== Selected works ==
- Hurry Hurry illus. Mary Pepperrell Dana (W. R. Scott, 1938)
- The Wreck of the Wild Wave: Being the True Account of the Wreck of the Clipper Ship Wild Wave of Boston illus. Josiah Nickerson Knowles (Oxford University Press, 1942)
- Jerry the Jeep illus. Theodore Friday (Lothrop, 1945)
- The Galleon from Manila (Oxford University Press, 1949)
- Mr. Shortsleeves' Great Big Store illus. Bernice Myers (Simon & Schuster, 1952)
- The Golden Hind, illus. Leonard Everett Fisher (Crowell, 1960)
- Sandpipers illus. Lucienne Bloch (Crowell, 1961)
- Starfish illus. Lucienne Bloch (Crowell, 1962)
- Sailers, Whalers and Steamers: Ships that Opened the West illus. Lyle Galloway (Lane, 1964)
- Who Will Be Mine? illus. by photographs (Golden Gate, 1966)
- The White Horse illus. Tony Chen (Harper, 1970)
- Come With Me to Nursery School illus. Edward Bigelow (Coward, 1970)
- Dinosaur, My Darling illus. by Don Freeman (Harper & Row, 1978)
- The Black Dog Who Went into the Woods illus. Emily Arnold McCully (Harper, 1980)
- I Dance in My Red Pajamas illus. Emily Arnold McCully (Harper, 1982)
- Song of the Sea Otter illus. Jennifer Dewey (Pantheon, 1983)

=== with Margaret Wise Brown ===
- The Man in the Manhole and the Fix-It Men, illus. Bill Ballantine (New York: W. R. Scott, 1946), written as "Juniper Sage", OCLC 1698467
- Five Little Firemen, illus. Tibor Gergely (Little Golden Books, 1948)
- The Little Fat Policeman, illus. Alice and Martin Provensen (Little Golden Books, 1950)

=== Illustrated by Clement Hurd ===
- Benny the Bulldozer (Lothrop, Lee & Shepard Co., 1947)
- Caboose (Lothrop, Lee & Shepard Co., 1950)
- Little Brass Band (Harper, 1955)
- Windy and the Willow Whistle (Sterling, 1956)
- Mr. Charlie, the Fireman's Friend (Lippincott, 1958)
- Last One Home is a Green Pig (Harper, 1959)
- Hurry Hurry (Harper, 1960) — re-issue of a book published in 1938 by W. R. Scott with illustrations by Mary Pepperrell Dana
- Come and Have Fun (Harper, 1962)
- Christmas Eve (Harper, 1962)
- No Funny Business (Harper, 1962)
- The Day the Sun Danced (Harper, 1965)
- Johnny Lion's Book (Harper, 1965)
- What Whale? Where? (Harper, 1966)
- The Blue Heron Tree (Viking, 1968)
- This is the Forest (Coward-McCann, 1969)
- Catfish (Viking, 1970)
- Johnny Lion's Bad Day (Harper, 1970)
- Wilson's World (Harper, 1971)
- Johnny Lion's Rubber Boots (Harper, 1972)
- The Mother Owl (Little, Brown, 1974)
- The Mother Kangaroo (Little, Brown, 1976)
- Look for a Bird (Harper & Row, 1977)
- The Mother Chimpanzee (Little, Brown, 1978)
- Under the Lemon Tree (Little, Brown, 1980)
