= Esphyr Slobodkina =

American artist, author, and illustrator (1908–2002)

- Slobodkina seated in front of Irish Elegy, c.1948-50
- Born: September 22, 1908; Chelyabinsk, Russia
- Died: July 21, 2002 (aged 93); Glen Head, New York, U.S.
- Citizenship: American (naturalized)
- Education: National Academy of Design
- Occupations: Artist, author
- Spouse(s): Ilya Bolotowsky (m. 1933–1938); William Urquhart (m. 1960–1963)
- Writing career
- Pen name: Phyra Slobodkina
- Genre: Children's literature
- Notable work: Caps for Sale
- Notable awards: Lewis Carroll Shelf Award, 1958
- Movement: abstraction

Esphyr Solomonovna Slobodkina (Russian: Эсфирь Соломоновна Слободкина; September 22, 1908 – July 21, 2002) was a Russian-born American artist, author, and illustrator, best known for her classic children's picture book Caps for Sale. Slobodkina was a celebrated avant garde artist and feminist in the middle part of the 20th century.

== Biography ==
Esphyr Slobodkina (ESS-phere sloh-BOD-kee-nah) was born in Chelyabinsk, Russian Empire in 1908. The Russian Revolution of 1917 created an unstable and dangerous climate for their Jewish family and she emigrated with her family to Harbin, Manchuria (China), where she studied art and architecture. Slobodkina immigrated to the United States in 1928. She enrolled at the National Academy of Design. It was there that she met her future husband, Russian-born Ilya Bolotowsky (they divorced in 1938). Along with Ilya, Slobodkina was a founding member of the American Abstract Artists group, which began amid controversy in 1936. Like other Russian modernists, surrounded by ancient icons and a rich craft tradition, Slobodkina developed a lifelong appreciation of clear, rich colors, and flat, stylized forms.

According to her biography on the HarperCollins website,

In 1938 Slobodkina met the children's author Margaret Wise Brown. In an effort to find work as an illustrator, Slobodkina wrote and illustrated a story with collage called Mary And The Poodies to present to Brown. This began a new career for Slobodkina, who illustrated many children's stories for Ms. Brown (including Sleepy ABCs and the Big and Little series) while still continuing her work as an abstract artist.

Front cover of Caps for Sale, 1940

In the late 1930s, Slobodkina began to write and illustrate her own children's books. Among her 24 published works, Caps for Sale (1940) is considered a children's book classic; it has sold more than 7.5 million copies and has been translated into more than a dozen languages. Caps for Sale won the Lewis Carroll Shelf Award in 1958. Her other children's works include The Wonderful Feast (written in 1928, first published in 1955), The Clock (1956), The Long Island Ducklings (1961), and Pezzo the Peddler and the Circus Elephant (1967), reissued as Circus Caps for Sale (2002).

In 1948, feeling the need to get out of New York City and having saved some money, Slobodkina built a house in Great Neck, New York and moved there with her mother; they remained in the house until 1977. According to the Sullivan Goss art gallery website,

during this period she was invited back to the Yaddo artist’s colony and also accepted a residency at the MacDowell Colony in New Hampshire. In 1960, Slobodkina married William Urquhart, a business owner whom she had met in 1942 at an American Abstract Artists show. They were married for three years, but in 1963, Urquhart died after suffering from a prolonged illness. Slobodkina stated that “it took me some six years to just recover from the grief and life in general was never the same”... In 1967, Slobodkina and her mother began travelling to Florida to be close to her sister. Annual trips to the southern state soon became impractical because of her mother’s failing health and in 1979, they permanently relocated to Hallandale, Florida. After the death of Slobodkina's brother-in-law in 1974 and her mother in 1975, her sister Tamara joined her in her Hallandale home. The two sisters continued to live together for the rest of Slobodkina's life, moving from Hallandale to West Hartford, CT, then back to Great Neck before settling in Glen Head, Long Island.

Slobodkina died in 2002.

== Work ==
Through the 1930s, Slobodkina developed her unique method of working in oils; a flattened, abstracted style that incorporated line, suspended or interlocking forms. But by the late 30s and 40s, Slobodkina was using a variety of techniques and materials. Many of her works were collages and constructions, integrating paint, wood, plastic, and metal with everyday objects such as parts of disassembled typewriters and computers into amusing and often great art. Slobodkina's work eventually received high acclaim. In 1943, Slobodkina was included in Peggy Guggenheim's show Exhibition by 31 Women at the Art of This Century gallery in New York.

“Her life’s work pulled imagery and objects together into magnificent compositions time and time again," stated Harold Porcher, an authority on Slobodkina's art. "I equate an artist like Esphyr to the American mockingbird. A mockingbird borrows and embellishes the songs of other birds around him. Often he changes the phrasing as he incorporates each element into an orchestration of birdsong. The abstract expressionist movement shifted the center of the art world from Paris to New York City, where it remains today. Slobodkina was a member of the early founders of American Abstract Artists which help to establish abstraction as a viable form of expression in America.

In the last years of the 20th century, Slobodkina continued her productivity, alternating serious work on abstract paintings with the more relaxing activities — to her — of creating sculpture, wall hangings, multimedia constructions, dolls and jewelry, often made out of old typewriter and computer parts.

As Anne Cohen DePietro wrote, "Traversing nearly a century of inspiration, it is Slobodkina’s enduring delight in the creative act and her single-minded pursuit of her aesthetic vision in a multiplicity of media that continues to enchant."

== Legacy ==
In April 2000, at age 91, Slobodkina established the Slobodkina Foundation, dedicated to the conservation, preservation, and exhibition of art. The Slobodkina Foundation was designed to educate the public about Slobodkina's work and encourage others to pursue their dreams through awareness of Slobodkina's accomplishments.

Before her death in 2002, Slobodkina redesigned her home in Long Island, New York, as a mini-museum and reading room for children, a place where guests viewed more than 500 works of art for more than ten years. Although the Slobodkina Home was sold in 2011, the Slobodkina Foundation continues to preserve the legacy of Slobodkina's career.

Her paintings, sculptures and literary works are part of the collections of The Metropolitan Museum, New York; the Smithsonian; the Philadelphia Museum of Art; the Heckscher Museum of Art; Hillwood Art Museum, the Whitney Museum, New York; the Northeast Children's Literature Collection, Thomas J. Dodd Research Center, University of Connecticut, Storrs, Connecticut; the Corcoran Gallery, Washington, DC; the Museum of Fine Arts, Boston; the de Grummond Children's Literature Collection, The University of Southern Mississippi; the New York Public Library; among others.

From October 3, 2025 – January 11, 2026, the Arkansas Museum of Fine Arts exhibited Architects of Being: Louise Nevelson and Esphyr Slobodkina. The show examined “the ways in which they constructed their identities in a midcentury American art world.” The show will travel to Chrysler Museum of Art and the New Britain Museum of American Art. The catalog, Architects of Being: The Creative Lives of Louise Nevelson and Esphyr Slobodkina, was edited by Catherine Walworth. (ISBN 978-1-68226-280-1)

== Bibliography ==
Written and illustrated by Esphyr Slobodkina unless otherwise noted

- The Little Fireman, written by Margaret Wise Brown (W. R. Scott, 1938) — illustrator
- Caps for Sale (W. R. Scott, 1940)
- The Little Cowboy, written by Margaret Wise Brown (W. R. Scott, 1948) — illustrator
- The Little Farmer, written by Margaret Wise Brown (W. R. Scott, 1948) — illustrator
- Sleepy ABC, written by Margaret Wise Brown (Lothrop, 1953) — illustrator
- The Clock (Abelard-Schuman, 1956)
- Little Dog Lost, Little Dog Found (Abelard-Schuman, 1956)
- Behind the Dark Window Shade (Lothrop, Lee and Shepard Co., 1958)
- The Little Dinghy (Abelard-Schuman, 1958)
- Pinky and the Petunias (Abelard-Schuman, 1959)
- Moving Day for the Middlemans (Abelard-Schuman, 1960)
- Jack and Jim (Abelard-Schuman, 1961)
- The Long Island Ducklings (Lantern Press, 1961)
- Boris and His Balalaika, illustrated by Vladimir Bobri (Abelard-Schuman, 1964)
- Pezzo the Peddler and the Circus Elephant (Abelard-Schuman, 1967) — later retitled Circus Caps for Sale
- The Wonderful Feast (E. M. Hale, 1967)
- The Flame, the Breeze, and the Shadow (Rand McNally and Co., 1967)
- Billy, the Condominium Cat (Addison-Wesley, 1980)
- Spots, Alias Prince (E. Slobodkina, 1987)
- Mary and the Poodies (E. Slobodkina, 1994)
- More Caps for Sale with Ann Marie Mulhearn Sayer (HarperCollins, 2015) — published posthumously
- Caps for Sale and the Mindful Monkeys with Ann Marie Mulhearn Sayer (HarperCollins, 2017) — published posthumously

== Other sources ==
- Esphyr Slobodkina, Notes for a Biographer, a three-volume, limited edition autobiography.
- Gail Stavitsky and Elizabeth Wylie, The Life and Art of Esphyr Slobodkina, Tufts Univ Art Gallery (1992), ISBN 99927-786-4-4.
- Ann Marie Sayer et al., Rediscovering Slobodkina: A Pioneer of American Abstraction, Hudson Hills Press (2009), ISBN 1-55595-312-3.
- JoAnn Conrad, Esphyr Slobodkina – Modernist (Children’s Book) Illustrator/Author, https://blogs.lib.uconn.edu/archives/2015/09/29/esphyr-slobodkina-modernist-childrens-book-illustratorauthor/
