= Stride Toward Freedom =

1958 book by Martin Luther King Jr.

- First edition
- Author: Martin Luther King Jr.
- Language: English
- Genre: Non-fiction
- Publication date: 1958
- Publication place: United States
- OCLC: 1016627
- Dewey Decimal: 301.451
- LC Class: E185.89.T8 K5

Stride Toward Freedom: The Montgomery Story (published 1958) is Martin Luther King Jr.'s historic account of the 1955–1956 Montgomery bus boycott. The book describes the conditions of African Americans living in Alabama during the era, and chronicles the events and participants' planning and thoughts about the boycott and its aftermath.

== Pilgrimage to Nonviolence ==
In the chapter "Pilgrimage to Nonviolence", King outlined his understanding of nonviolence at the time, which seeks to win an opponent to friendship, rather than to humiliate or defeat him. The chapter draws from an address by Wofford, with Rustin and Stanley Levison also providing guidance and ghostwriting.

== See also ==
- Martin Luther King and the Montgomery Story

== External sources ==
- Stanford University Encyclopedia entry on the volume
