= Goodnight Moon =

1947 American children's picture book

- Book cover
- Author: Margaret Wise Brown
- Illustrator: Clement Hurd
- Language: English
- Genre: Children's literature
- Publisher: Harper & Brothers
- Publication date: September 3, 1947
- Publication place: United States
- Pages: 32pp
- ISBN: 0-06-443017-0
- OCLC: 299277
- Dewey Decimal: [E] 21
- LC Class: PZ7.B8163 Go 1997
- Preceded by: The Runaway Bunny
- Followed by: My World

Goodnight Moon is an American children's book written by Margaret Wise Brown and illustrated by Clement Hurd. It was published on September 3, 1947, and is a highly acclaimed bedtime story.

This book is the second in Brown and Hurd's "classic series," which also includes The Runaway Bunny and My World. The three books have been published together as a collection titled Over the Moon.

== Background ==
In 1935, author Margaret Wise Brown enrolled at the Bank Street Experimental School in New York City. At Bank Street, Brown studied childhood development alongside the school's founder, Lucy Sprague Mitchell, who believed that children preferred stories about everyday topics rather than fantasies. Mitchell's ideas combined with Brown's observance of what children enjoyed formed the foundation for Brown's writing, including the familiar world depicted in Goodnight Moon.

Brown drew inspiration for the book from childhood bedtime rituals in which she and her sister said goodnight to toys and other objects in their nursery. In 1945, the memory reappeared to Margaret Wise Brown in a dream, inspiring the book that became Goodnight Moon. She wrote down the story in the morning, with the original title of the book being Goodnight Room. Brown gave illustrator Clement Hurd very little direction on the illustrations, and the characters in Goodnight Moon are depicted as rabbits because Hurd was better at drawing rabbits than humans. This was among several decisions made regarding the illustrations over the course of the book's creation. Other revisions include replacing a framed map on the wall with a scene from The Runaway Bunny and blurring the udder of the "cow that jumped over the moon."

== Publication history ==
Goodnight Moon had poor initial sales: only 6,000 copies were sold upon initial release in the fall of 1947. Anne Carroll Moore, the influential children's librarian at the New York Public Library (NYPL), regarded it as "unbearably sentimental". The NYPL and other libraries did not acquire it at first. During the post-World War II Baby Boom years, it slowly became a bestseller. Annual sales grew from about 1,500 copies in 1953 to almost 20,000 in 1970; by 1990, the total number of copies sold exceeded four million. As of 2007, the book sells about 800,000 copies annually, and by 2017 had cumulatively sold an estimated 48 million copies. Goodnight Moon has been translated into at least fifteen other languages.

In 1952, at the age of 42, Margaret Wise Brown died following a routine operation, and did not live to see the success of her book. Brown bequeathed the royalties to the book (among many others) to Albert Clarke, who was the nine-year-old son of a neighbor when Brown died. Clarke, whose rights to the book earned him millions of dollars, said that Brown was his mother, a claim others dismiss.

Illustrator Clement Hurd said in 1983 that initially the book was to be published using the pseudonym "Memory Ambrose" for Brown, with his illustrations credited to "Hurricane Jones".

In 2005, publisher HarperCollins digitally altered the photograph of illustrator Hurd, which had been on the book for at least twenty years, to remove a cigarette. HarperCollins' editor-in-chief for children's books, Kate Jackson, said: "It is potentially a harmful message to very young [children]." HarperCollins had the reluctant permission of Hurd's son, Thacher Hurd, but the younger Hurd said the photo of Hurd with his arm and fingers extended, holding nothing, "looks slightly absurd to me". HarperCollins has said it will likely replace the picture with a different, unaltered photo of Hurd in future editions.

=== Other editions ===
In addition to several octavo and duodecimo paperback editions, Goodnight Moon is available as a board book and in "jumbo" edition designed for use with large groups.

- 1991, US, HarperFestival ISBN 0-694-00361-1, publication date September 30, 1991, board book.
- 1997, US, HarperCollins ISBN 0-06-027504-9, publication date February 28, 1997, Hardback 50th anniversary edition.
- 2007, US, HarperCollins ISBN 0-694-00361-1, publication date January 23, 2007, Board book 60th anniversary edition.

In 2008, Thacher Hurd used his father's artwork from Goodnight Moon to produce Goodnight Moon 123: A Counting Book. In 2010, HarperCollins used artwork from the book to produce Goodnight Moon's ABC: An Alphabet Book.

In 2012, Loud Crow Interactive Inc. released a Goodnight Moon interactive app.

== Synopsis ==
The text is a rhyming poem, describing an anthropomorphic rabbit's bedtime ritual of saying "good night" to various inanimate and living objects in the rabbit's bedroom; a red balloon, a pair of socks, the rabbit's dollhouse, a bowl of mush, an old woman (an older female anthropomorphic rabbit) who apparently says "hush", the Moon outside the window, and two kittens, among others; despite the kittens, a mouse is present in each spread. The book begins at 7:00 PM, and ends at 8:10 PM, with each spread being spaced 10 minutes apart, as measured by the two clocks in the room and reflected (improbably) in the rising Moon. The illustrations alternate between 2-page black-and-white spreads of objects and 2-page color spreads of the room, like the other books in the series (a common cost-saving technique at the time).

== Allusions and references ==
Goodnight Moon contains a number of references to Brown and Hurd's The Runaway Bunny, and to traditional children's literature. For example, the room of Goodnight Moon generally resembles the next-to-last spread of The Runaway Bunny, where the little bunny becomes a little boy and runs into a house, and the mother bunny becomes the little boy's mother; shared details include the fireplace and the painting by the fireplace of "The Cow Jumping Over the Moon", though other details differ (the colors of the walls and floor are switched, for instance). The painting is itself a reference to the nursery rhyme "Hey Diddle Diddle," where a cow jumps over the moon. However, when reprinted in Goodnight Moon, the udder was reduced to an anatomical blur to avoid the controversy that E.B. White's Stuart Little had undergone when published in 1945. The painting of three bears, sitting in chairs, alludes to "Goldilocks and the Three Bears" (originally "The Story of the Three Bears"), which also contains a copy of the cow jumping over the moon painting. The other painting in the room, which is never explicitly mentioned in the text, portrays a bunny fly-fishing for another bunny, using a carrot as bait. This picture is also a reference to The Runaway Bunny, where it is the first colored spread, when the mother says that if the little bunny becomes a fish, she will become a fisherman and fish for him. The top shelf of the bookshelf, below the Runaway Bunny painting, holds an open copy of The Runaway Bunny, and there is a copy of Goodnight Moon on the nightstand.

== Literary significance and reception ==
In a 2007 online poll, the National Education Association listed the book as one of its "Teachers' Top 100 Books for Children." In 2012 it was ranked number four among the "Top 100 Picture Books" in a survey published by School Library Journal.

When Goodnight Moon was first published, it was considered controversial for such reasons as its lack of educational message and its narrative being confined to a single room. From the time of its publication in 1947 until 1972, the book was "banned" by the New York Public Library due to the then-head children's librarian Anne Carroll Moore's hatred of the book. According to children's literature expert Betsy Bird, Moore criticized Goodnight Moon due to the fact that she believed it lacked a meaningful narrative structure and educational value. Moore was considered a top taste-maker and arbiter of children's books not only in the New York Public Library, but for libraries nationwide in the United States, even well past her official retirement. The book was stocked on the library's shelves only in 1972, at the time of the 25th anniversary of its publication. The NYPL explains the book's absence from its 2020 list of the 10 most-checked-out books in the library's history as due to this long period of exclusion.

Children's author Susan Cooper describes the book as possibly the only "realistic story" to gain the universal affection of a fairy-tale, while describing its narrative as a "deceptively simple ritual" rather than a story. Other authors have suggested that the book creates an atmosphere of peace and calm, teaches children that life is stable, and can be trusted, and that unlike stories that merely use the night as a theme it can be helpful in putting children to sleep.

== Analysis ==
In his article Bedtime Books, the Bedtime Story Ritual, and Goodnight Moon, Daniel Pereira analyzes the function of Goodnight Moon as a "bedtime book" that is not only beneficial to children at bedtime, but is beneficial to parents as well. Pereira first defines a "bedtime book" as a book that both "represents" bedtime and is about bedtime, and is meant to be read by a parent and child together. Pereira further argues that bedtime books such as Goodnight Moon serve parental interests since they help parents carry out their duty of being an "entertainer, educator, enchanter" at bedtime while also maintaining a sense of independence between the child and the parent. Pereira analyzes the effectiveness of Goodnight Moon's illustrations in assisting parents at bedtime through discussing Joseph Stanton's evaluation of the role of the "old lady", who is treated as another "feature of the landscape" rather than as a character herself. Stanton notes that the objectification of the old lady contributes to a sense of independence in the child, who lacks a true parental figure in the "great green room". Pereira asserts that despite this objectification, the old lady still conveys a message when she whispers "hush". He notes that in doing so, the old lady "delivers the parent's bedtime message for them," which reminds the child reader to be quiet.

In the article "Goodnight Nobody': Comfort and the Vast Dark in the Picture-Poems of Margaret Wise Brown and Her Collaborators", author Joseph Stanton discusses a motif present in Goodnight Moon that he refers to as "child-alone-in-the-wide-world". According to Stanton, this motif is present in much of Brown's work and is characterized by a child character finding resolution in being left alone. Further contributing to this motif, Stanton argues that the child is at the center of both the words and the illustrations in Goodnight Moon due to a lack of any parental figure. He states that the voice in Goodnight Moon is not the child's voice, but rather an omniscient voice that knows and understands what the child sees. Additionally, Stanton comments that each illustration focuses on what the child is looking at, which corresponds to what is being named in each scene.

In his article 'Goodnight Moon' was once banned: Classic children's book marks 75th anniversary, Jim Beckerman presents analysis about why children enjoy Goodnight Moon. Beckerman references professor Julie Rosenthal's point that Goodnight Moon acts as a "scavenger hunt" for children, as they are able to search the illustrations for each object mentioned in the book. Beckerman also mentions some of professor April Patrick's ideas, such as how the rhyming scheme fascinates children, as well as how children feel comfort in reading a book about real things.

== Animated adaptation ==
In 1985, Weston Woods released a filmstrip adaptation of the book.

On July 15, 1999, Goodnight Moon was announced as a 26-minute animated family video special/documentary, which debuted on HBO Family in December of that year, and was released on VHS on April 15, 2000, and DVD in 2005, in the United States. The special features an animated short of Goodnight Moon, narrated by Susan Sarandon, along with six other animated segments of children's bedtime stories and lullabies with live-action clips of children reflecting on a series of bedtime topics in between, a reprise of Goodnight Moon at the end, and the Everly Brothers' "All I Have To Do Is Dream" playing over the closing credits. The special is notable for its post-credits clip, which features a boy being interviewed about dreams but stumbling over his sentence, which soon became a meme in 2011 when it was uploaded on YouTube. He was referencing a line from the 1997 Disney animated film Hercules. The boy's identity was unknown until July 2021, when he came forward as Joseph Cirkiel in a video interview with YouTuber wavywebsurf.

Here are the other tales and lullabies featured in the video:

- Lullaby: "Hit the Road to Dreamland" sung by Tony Bennett (This lullaby plays in the opening credits, right before Goodnight Moon.)
- Lullaby: "Hush, Little Baby" sung by Lauryn Hill
- Story: There's a Nightmare in My Closet narrated by Billy Crystal
- Story: Tar Beach narrated by Natalie Cole
- Lullaby: "Brahms' Lullaby" sung by Aaron Neville
- Lullaby: "Twinkle, Twinkle, Little Star" sung by Patti LaBelle

== Musical adaptation ==
In 2012, American composer Eric Whitacre obtained the copyright holder's permission to set the words to music. He did so initially for a soprano, specifically his then wife Hila Plitmann, with harp and string orchestra. He subsequently arranged it for soprano and piano, SSA (two soprano lines plus alto; commissioned by the National Children's Chorus), and SATB (commissioned by a consortium of choirs).

In 2019 the Denver Center For The Performing Arts put on a 3-month production of Goodnight Moon as part of their Theatre For Young Audiences program. The 50 minute show included whimsical song and dance and had a second run just recently in 2025.

== Exhibit adaptations ==
In 2006, an exhibit titled "From Goodnight Moon to Art Dog: The World of Clement, Edith and Thacher Hurd" was on display at the Rhode Island School of Design in Providence, Rhode Island. This exhibit featured 3-D displays of Clement Hurd's artwork, as well as artwork from his wife, Edith Hurd, and his son, Thacher Hurd. Included in the displays was the "great green room" scene from Goodnight Moon. Providence was the exhibit's final stop in the United States. The exhibit had also featured shows in Vermont, Michigan, Florida and South Carolina.

In 2022, a Canadian artist Matthew-Robin Nye created a solo art installation "Goodnight Moon: a Rhythm, a Tempo" which was displayed at Beaverbrook Art Gallery first and then began its journey over other museums in Canada. The exhibit depicts the scene where "Goodnight Moon" story takes place, representing the room with all the featured subjects in it. The exhibit is interactive: children are allowed to enter the space, touch the objects, lie on the bed, and play with the toys. Matthew-Robin Nye argues that the atmosphere created in the book is what makes it unique: "The book deviates from the standard fairy tale in that it does not have a moral, but a rhythm, a tempo. Because of this, it represents a major shift in how stories are told to us as we are developing; changing, in turn, how we develop. I believe that Goodnight Moon is the story of the environmental static around every fairy tale, the backgrounded processes vital to an experience, providing the lively textures from which a story stands out: in other words, experience for and of itself".
