= Polish Publishing House R. Wegner =

Polish publishing house active from 1917 to 1950

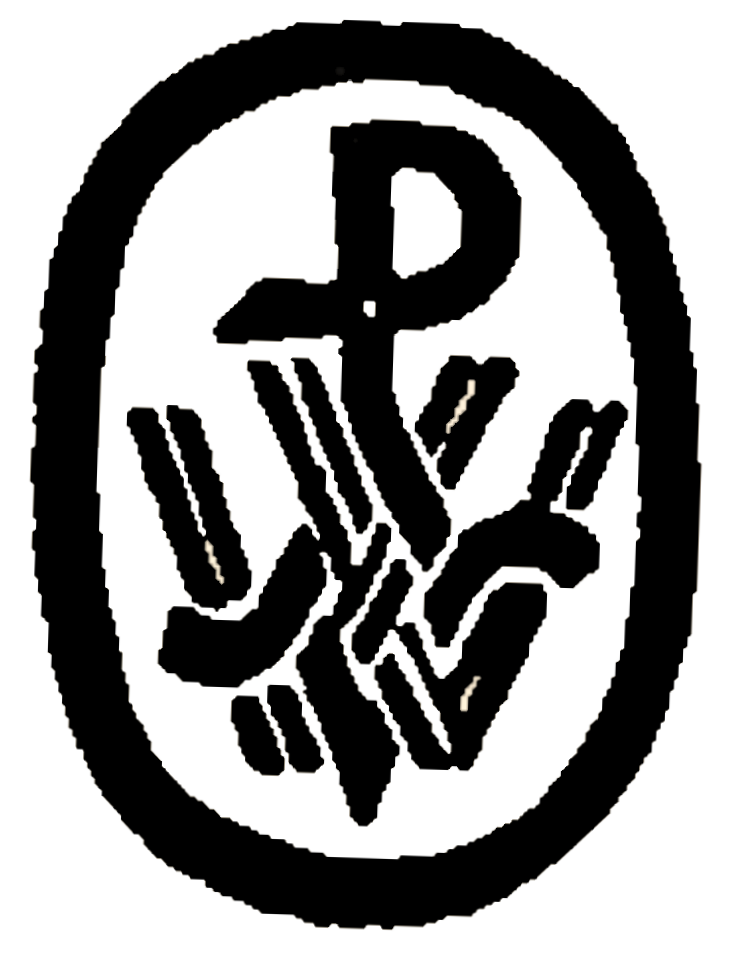

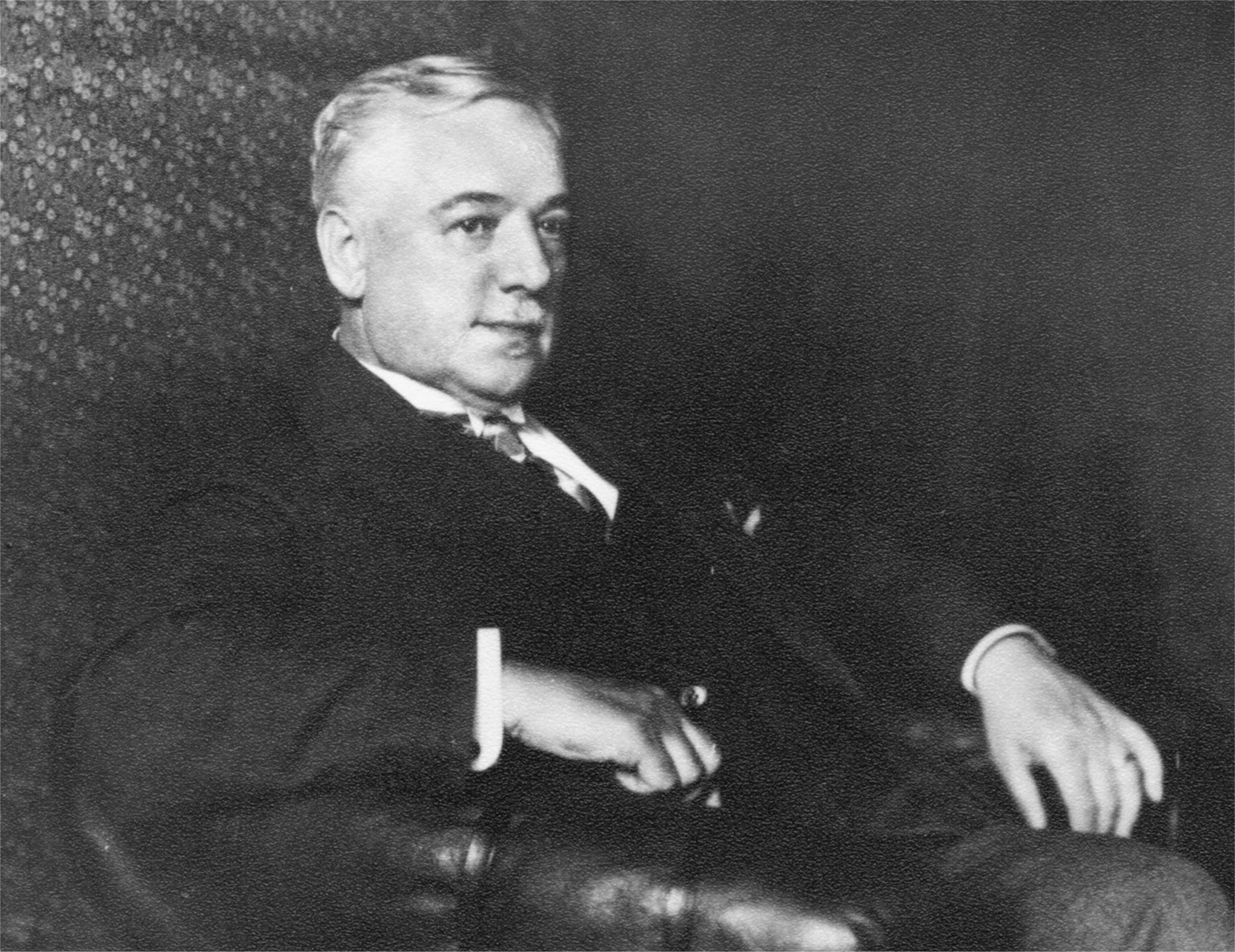
- Rudolf Wegner
- Native name: Wydawnictwo Polskie R. Wegnera
- Industry: publishing
- Founded: 1917 (as a joint-stock company Polish Publishing House)
- Defunct: 1950
- Headquarters: Poznań, Poland
- Key people: Ignacy Mościcki; Antoni Jakubski; Marian Kukiel; Tadeusz Kutrzeba; Roman Odzierzyński; Aleksander Litwinowicz
- Owner: Rudolf Wegner

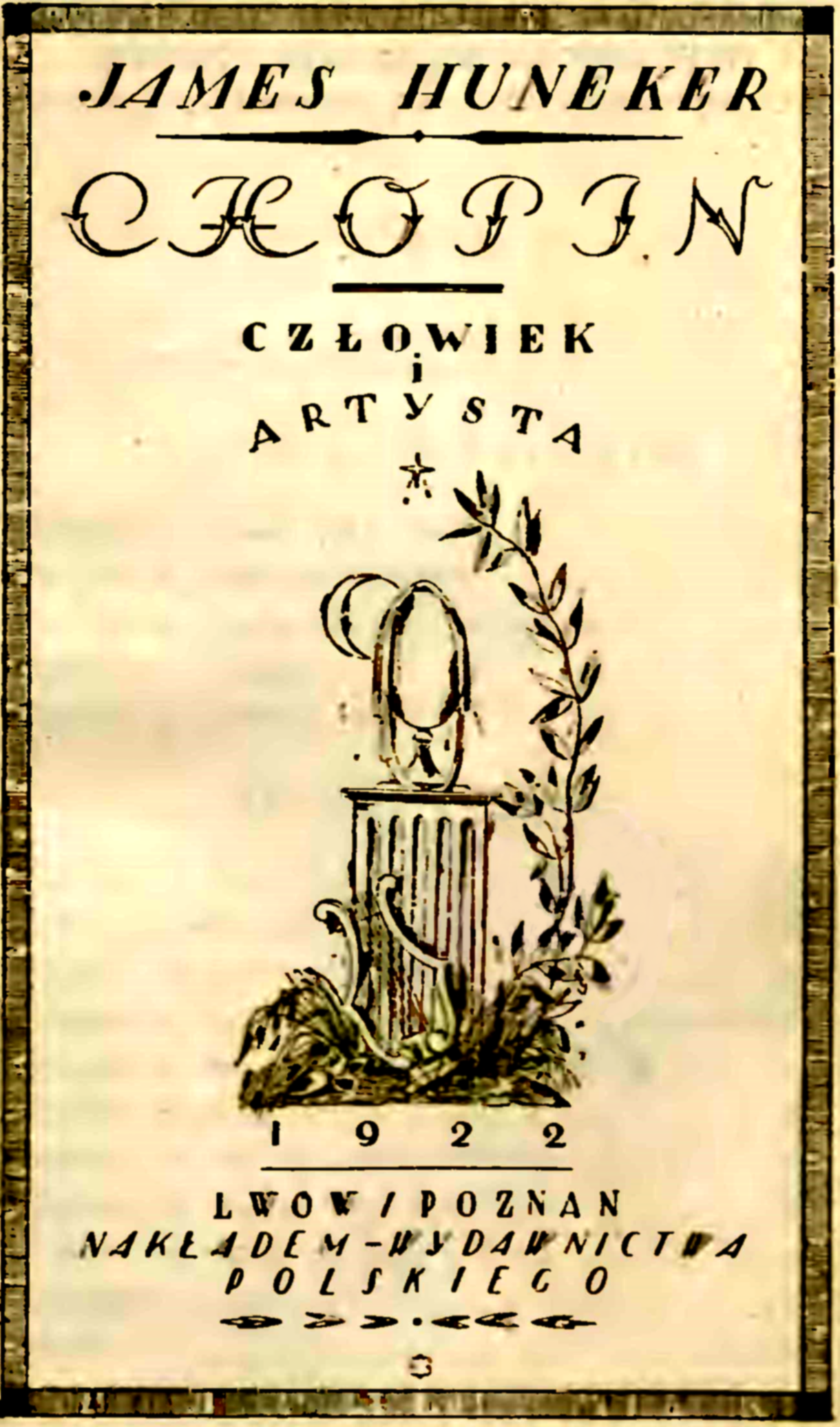
James Huneker: Chopin: The Man and His Music (Polish edition from 1922)

Polish Publishing House R. Wegner (Polish: Wydawnictwo Polskie R. Wegnera) was a Polish publishing house active from 1917 to 1950. It was founded as a joint-stock company by Rudolf Wegner as Polish Publishing House (Polish: Wydawnictwo Polskie), headquartered in Lviv, and later in Poznań. In 1926, Wegner took over ownership and changed the name to Polish Publishing House R. Wegner. It was mainly focused on Polish and foreign literature. It had a number of publishing series, the most famous being the Nobel Laureates Library and Wonders of Poland. It was characterized by great attention to the technical, literary, and graphic quality of its books, especially luxury bibliophile editions. The production output reached 300 new titles annually. During World War II, it was relocated to Warsaw and sold its warehouse stocks. In 1941, the owner, Rudolf Wegner, died, and the company passed into the hands of his wife, Wanda, and daughter, Irena Rybotycka. The assets of the publishing house were practically completely destroyed during the Warsaw Uprising. After the war, it resumed operations, but in 1950, it was nationalized and liquidated. Its activity was continued on a relatively small scale by the emigrant Tern (Rybitwa) Book Polish Publishing House in London until the 1970s.

== History ==
=== From 1901 to 1914: origins ===
Rudolf Wegner began his publishing activity by founding a partnership with Zygmunt Rychliński in 1901 and acquiring a bookstore on Piotrkowska Street in Łódź, which was a branch of the Gebethner i Wolff publishing house. The company conducted intensive publishing activities, offering scientific and popular science books, textbooks, sheet music, fiction, as well as magazines such as the humorous Łodzianka and the professional Czasopismo Lekarskie. In 1905, Wegner, probably due to political reasons (suspicions by the authorities of involvement in the Russian Revolution of 1905 and distribution of books outside censorship), had to immediately leave the territory of the Russian partition. He settled in Lviv and started working at the Altenberg and Ossolineum publishing houses.

=== From 1917 to 1928: Polish Publishing House ===
In 1917, Wegner formed a joint-stock company, whose shareholders included Ignacy Mościcki, Antoni Jakubski, Marian Kukiel, Tadeusz Kutrzeba, Roman Odzierzyński, and Aleksander Litwinowicz. The capital obtained allowed the establishment of the Polish Publishing House in November 1917, with Wegner as its director. The headquarters of the new publishing house was established in Lviv at 15 Zyblikiewicza Street. In 1920, Wegner moved it to Poznań, initially to premises at 5 Freedom Square, lent by Jan Jachowski, and then to 48 St. Martin Street. In the Polish Booksellers' Association, the publishing house was registered at 6 Zwierzyniecka Street.

Poznań was a calm city, much less destroyed by the war than Lviv and Warsaw, with a well-developed printing and publishing industry. In these conditions, Wegner led the company to rapid development. Close cooperation was established with Stanisław Wasylewski. From 1920, publishing series began to appear. In 1921, Stanisław Lam became the manager and literary advisor of the publishing house. The first volume of the largest series of the publishing house, the Library of Nobel Laureates, was published at that time. The publishing house intensified its activities, gradually reaching a level of about 300 titles per year. Its production was presented, among others, at the book exhibition in Poznań (1924) and the 2nd International Book Exhibition in Florence (1925). In 1926, Stanisław Wasylewski took over the editing of the Library of Nobel Laureates, and a year later, he became the editor of the publishing house.

=== From 1939 to 1945: World War II ===
After the Germans occupied Poznań in 1939, Wegner's publishing house was closed by the occupation authorities, and the owner was expelled from Poznań. The books from the publishing house's warehouses in Poznań and Lviv were earmarked for destruction by the occupiers. Valuable private collections were burned by the Germans in the Wolności Square in Poznań.

Wegner settled in Warsaw and continued his activities under the name Polish Publishing House R. Wegner. First, he undertook efforts to save the publishing house's resources in Poznań. Initial attempts, including those by the bookseller and publisher Gustaw Tetzlaw, failed. (Note: Gustaw Tetzlaw was co-owner of one of the 3 largest bookselling and publishing companies in pre-war Poznań, W. Górski and G. Tetzlaw Bookstore. Tetzlaw's efforts to get permission from the occupying German authorities to export his own company's books to Warsaw were also unsuccessful.) Wegner then sought help from Stefan Szpinger, who had previously successfully organized the transportation of collections from the Poznań Printing House and Bookstore of St. Adalbert to Warsaw by rail. All materials from the warehouse of Polish Publishing House were requisitioned by the Germans and haphazardly transferred to a railway warehouse. The entire stock was seized by the German Bank, which took over the pre-war credit of the publishing house. (Note: The value of the seized 300 tons of books destined for milling at a paper mill in Czerwonak near Poznań was estimated by the bank at 4,000 German marks (about 8,000 PLN).) Wegner managed to quickly repay the entire debt, regaining the ability to dispose of the warehouse's resources, and Szpinger, with great difficulty, obtained approvals from the Propaganda Abteilung, Presse Amt, and Gestapo for the removal of books. A condition imposed by the Gestapo was Szpinger's personal commitment to organize the collections after transportation to Warsaw and to hand over to the German authorities the titles listed as banned books. The transport to Warsaw was carried out by the transportation company C. Hartwig.

In addition to the warehouse resources, Wegner had substantial stocks of books ready for sale in the basement of his house on Słowacki Street, which, coincidentally, escaped the attention of the Germans. Szpinger organized a group of friendly booksellers from the Bookstore of St. Adalbert to pack the hidden books and then conducted a daring operation to transport them (also with the help of C. Hartwig) to the railway warehouse and mostly include them in the transport to Warsaw. Part of the stock was allocated for sale in Poznań, obtaining funds to cover the Poznań expenses related to the operation (Wegner's funds from Warsaw could not be used for this purpose, as the transport of cash from the General Government to the Reich territories was prohibited). In total, about 300 tons of books, loose printer's sheets, and supplies of clean paper were transported from Poznań, occupying 15 railway wagons. In this venture, Szpinger was assisted by Julian Stefański, Teodor Bielawski, and Stefan Szczypiński, as well as volunteer booksellers from the Bookstore of St. Adalbert. In Warsaw, the recovered materials were placed in a warehouse at 6/8 Okrąg Street. The books were distributed both in the official circulation and supplied to underground bookstores. The publishing house also printed small quantities of missing parts of Ossendowski's books on salvaged paper.

Stefan Szpinger earned recognition and friendship from Wegner with his selfless transport action, who appointed him as the manager of the publishing house and granted him full authority to conduct all affairs. On 13 July 1941, Rudolf Wegner died of a heart attack. The publishing house was taken over by his wife, Wanda, and daughter, Irena Rybotycka, and was still managed by Stefan Szpinger, who, among other things, concluded negotiations with Maria Rodziewiczówna, obtaining exclusivity for Polish Publishing House to publish her works. The most valuable part of the preserved books was transferred to a new warehouse at New World Street. The publishing house's activities during the occupation were profitable due to the high demand for Polish books. Apart from patriotic motives, they were treated as a capital investment and fetched very high prices on the secondary market; for example, the price of Disslowa's cookbook reached up to 1,000 PLN per copy. Several tens of thousands of stockpiled volumes were excluded from sale, deemed by Szpinger and the company's owners as assets intended to restart the publishing house after the war.

The German authorities hindered Polish bookselling activities, further harassing Wegner's company with inspections in bookstores. They also established a company with the misleading name Polish Publishing House – Polnische Verlag, publishing, among other things, books of a pornographic nature, aiming to discredit the real Wegner publishing house. The Germans also enforced Szpinger's Poznań obligation to hand over the banned books of the publishing house to the authorities. However, only one incomplete "platform" of some titles by Bandrowski and Rodziewiczówna was likely handed over.

During the Warsaw Uprising, books from the Wegner publishing house's warehouse on Okrąg Street were distributed to the insurgents for reading. Soon, the remaining books were used to build barricades, where they were destroyed. The warehouse on Okrąg Street was hit by a bomb and burned down; likewise, the second warehouse on New World Street burned down with all the books. As a result, the publishing house lost all its resources.

=== Post-war period ===
==== From 1945 to 1948: Germany ====
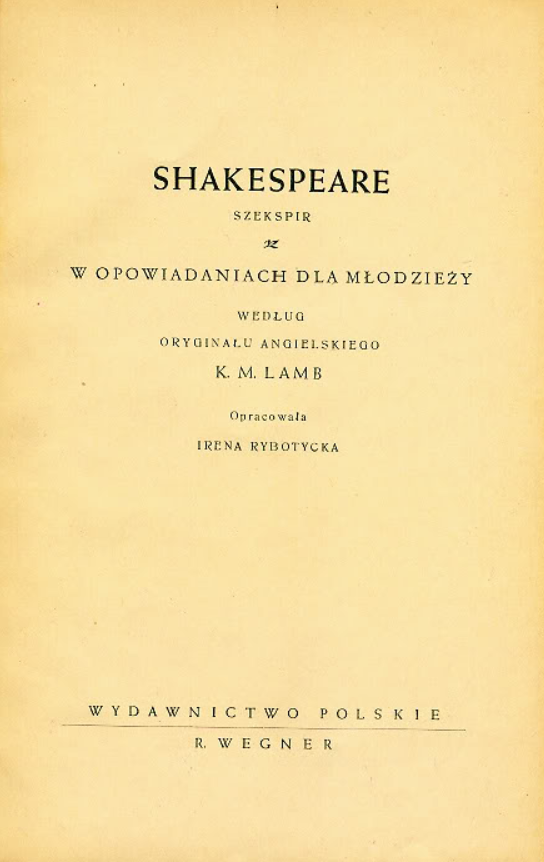
Title page of the book Tales from Shakespeare edited by Irena Rybotycka, Germany 1947/1948

In November 1945, Irena Rybotycka left Poland for the American occupation zone in Germany, where she reunited with her husband, Colonel Tomasz Rybotycki, a liaison officer of the Polish Military Mission. Both of them then began efforts to resume the activities of Polish Publishing House R. Wegner to provide access to Polish books for Polish war refugees. Tomasz Rybotycki became the head of the Welfare and Printing Team established within the Polish Military Mission, and Irena Rybotycka, working with the Polish Red Cross, obtained an allocation of paper from the United Nations Relief and Rehabilitation Administration. The Rybotyckis obtained permission to print books on religious and educational topics; the proposed set included 12 titles. They also managed to recover the old printing plates from Nuremberg, where Rudolf Wegner printed children's books. The resumed Polish Publishing House R. Wegner began its operations in Nuremberg in 1945, and books started to be published at the beginning of 1946. After a few months, the Rybotycki couple had to suddenly leave Germany due to the takeover of Polish facilities by the communist government. However, Tomasz Rybotycki managed to complete the printing of the planned titles, which were published until 1948.

==== From 1947 to 1974: England ====
After leaving Germany, the Rybotycki couple relocated to London. There, they received royalties for books published by Polish Publishing House R. Wegner during the war by the emigrant Ministry of Education. Together with Wanda Rybotycka, in 1947 they founded Tern (Rybitwa) Book Co. Ltd., (Note: Rybitwa (English: Tern) was an acronym for the surname and first names of the founders of the publishing house: Rybotycki, Irena, Tomasz, Wanda.) primarily publishing old titles from Polish Publishing House R. Wegner, including selected books from the Library of Nobel Laureates and Wonders of Poland series. The reissue of Maria Disslowa's cookbook Jak gotować achieved the greatest success, also published in English as Continental European Cooking. New titles included Zofia Kossak-Szczucka's Heritage and Sir Philip Gibbs' political novel No Price For Freedom to commemorate the 10th anniversary of the Warsaw Uprising. (Note: Philip Gibbs wrote this novel on the initiative of Irena Rybotycka. The original title, No Price for Freedom, and translations have circulated in a total print run of nearly 500,000 copies.) Rybitwa Publishing ceased its operations in 1974 after the death of T. Rybotycki.

==== From 1947 to 1950: Poland ====
Since 1947, Polish Publishing House R. Wegner resumed its operations in Poland. In the absence of the owners, the company was managed by a representative, Anna Łempicka. The headquarters were located in Warsaw at 10 Cecylia Śniegocka Street. They resumed the publication of several volumes from the Library of Nobel Laureates series, novels by Rodziewiczówna, as well as books for children and youth. The new editions were illustrated by Edward Kuczyński and Jan Marcin Szancer.

In 1950, the publishing house was liquidated by the decision of the Polish authorities at the time, and the publishing rights were taken over by the State Publishing Institute PIW.

== Description of activity ==
The primary goal of Polish Publishing House was to offer high-quality books. They were carefully crafted during a long publishing cycle, sometimes lasting from 4 to 6 years, and in some cases even up to 10 years (such as Maria Disslowa's Jak gotować). The books were visually appealing, with numerous illustrations usually done using the copper-plate technique. They had artistic bindings and a consistent appearance within each publishing series or for a particular author. Leading Polish writers were employed for translations from foreign languages and for book editing. The high level of illustration and graphic design was ensured by artists such as Edward Kuczyński, Ernest Czerper, Rafał Malczewski, Kamil Mackiewicz, Tadeusz Lipski, Feodor Rojankovsky, Leon Wyczółkowski, Jan Kilarski, and Jan Bułhak.

Printing was done on good quality paper, with later editions using special wood-free paper. Bibliophile albums were printed on handmade or Chinese paper. To enhance production, various font styles, typographic layouts, and formats were used, with colorful dust jackets. The quality of the books from Polish Publishing House is evidenced by letters received by Rudolf Wegner:

Thank you for the two beautiful copies of Dusza Zaczarowana, kindly sent to me. I would like us to have in France the Library of Nobel Laureates so artistically and diversely published.

— Romain Rolland, October 11, 1924

I have finally received a copy of the Polish edition of Julius Caesar [...]. Unable to judge the value of the translation, I admire the magnificence of the publication. In terms of printing, paper, and illustrations, it is the most splendid edition of my works. It has brought me much satisfaction, and I extend my congratulations to you.

— Guglielmo Ferrero, December 21, 1935

Speaking about this publication [Dzieje Papieży], I can only note that this edition makes an extraordinary impression. The paper, printing, binding are very good. Special commendation should be given to the illustrations, which are excellent in both selection and execution technique. I must confess frankly that this book in terms of illustration far surpassed the German edition.

— Franz Xaver Seppelt, January 9, 1937

The books were usually offered in two versions, paperback and "bound" (also known as "luxury"). Their prices were relatively high, up to 14 PLN for a hardcover book and 4–5 PLN cheaper for the paperback version. The cost of purchasing Wonders of Poland was even higher, reaching up to 20 PLN, which, however, considering the particularly attractive format and very high quality of the books, was often seen as a moderate price. Despite the high prices, the books sold quickly and were often reprinted. It was not until 1928 that high-volume printing of cheaper books (3 PLN per copy) intended for less demanding readers began.

In addition, Polish Publishing House offered luxury albums, priced at 100–200 PLN per copy. They were mostly purchased by the Ministry of Foreign Affairs of the Republic of Poland for representational purposes, as well as by bibliophiles.

The publishing house did not have its own bookstore. The editions were distributed mainly through Gebethner i Wolff bookstores, as well as by the Książnica-Atlas company, and also through the Dom Książki Polskiej in Warsaw.

== Printer's mark of the publishing house ==
The printer's mark of the publishing house underwent several changes. Initially, it had a circular shape, similar in style to the printer's mark of Edward Wende (which was Wegner's first place of employment). From the mid-1920s, the marks took the form of intertwined letters P and W, positioned one above the other. In some books, the mark was not included (for example, in the Wonders of Poland series).

Examples of printer's marks in books of the Polish Publishing House

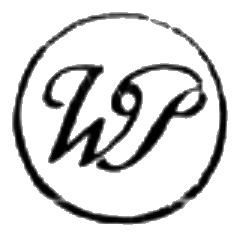
Stanisław Baczyński, Sztuka Walcząca, 1923

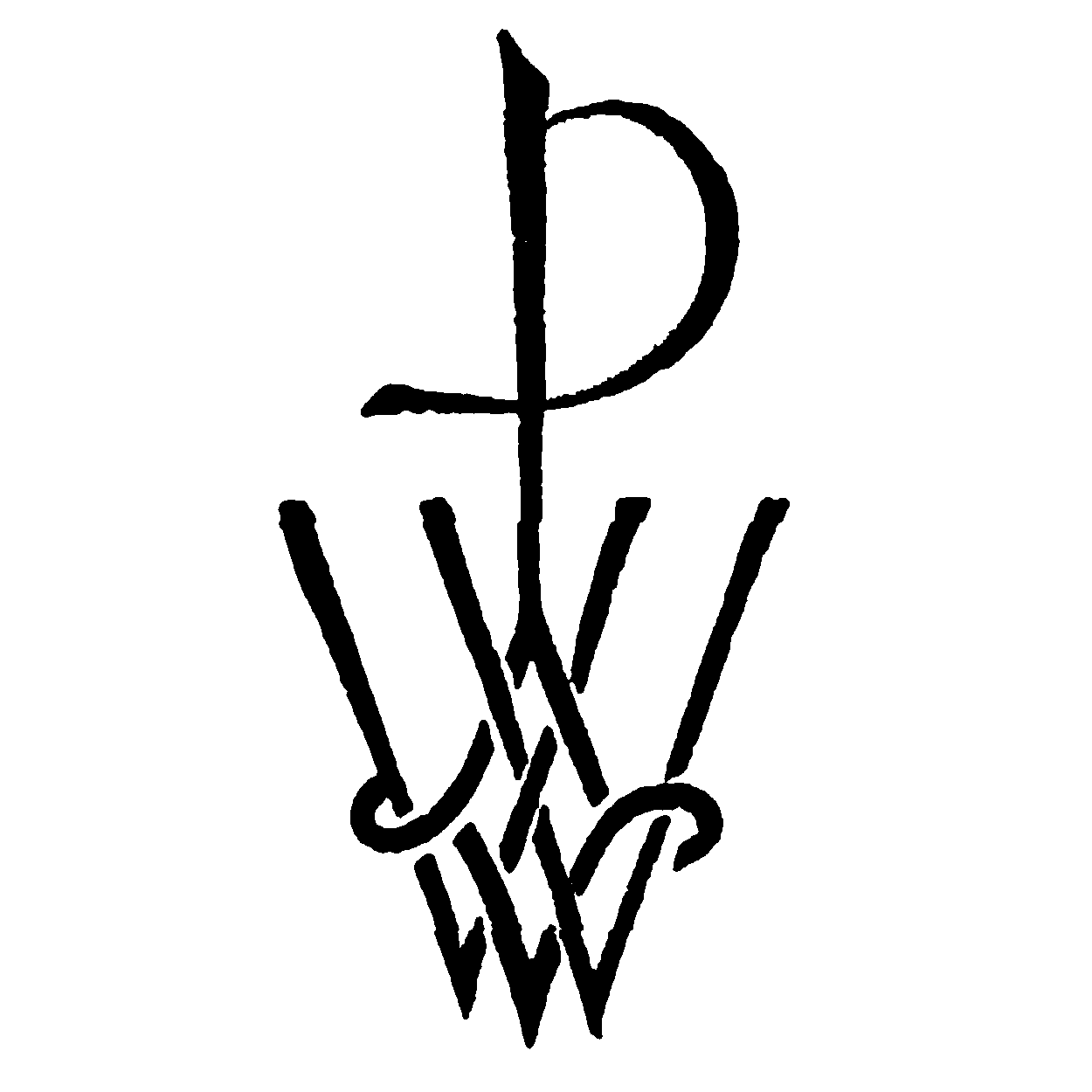
Karol Hubert Rostworowski, Antychryst. Tragedja w trzech aktach, 1925

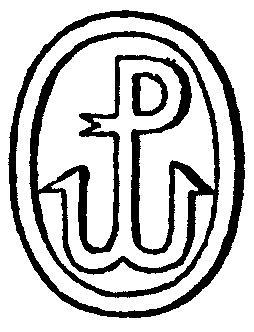
Benito Mussolini, Memoir of the War, 1931 (pre-title page)

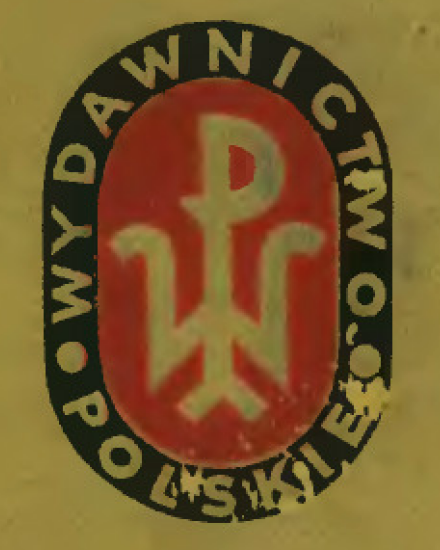
Marian Gawalewicz, Plotka, 1931

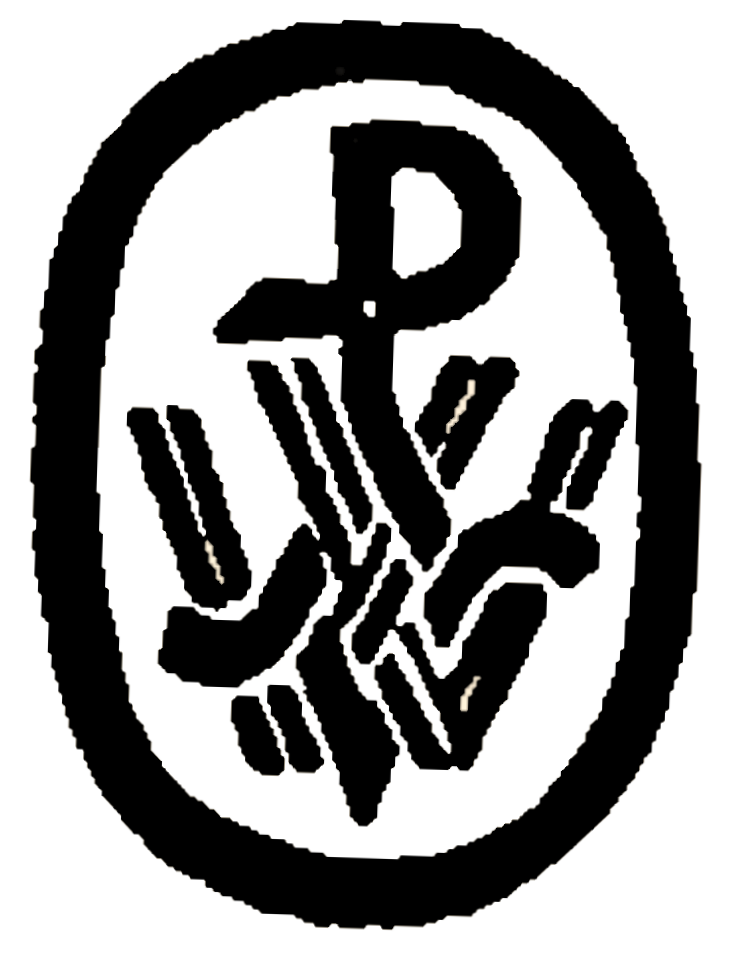
Stanisław Mycielski, W sercu dżungli, 1935

=== Kotwica symbol ===
Sign of Fighting Poland on the badge of the Zośka Battalion	Printer's mark from the back cover of the book ''Hunting Sea Monsters'', 1927
Sign of Fighting Poland on the badge of the Zośka Battalion	Printer's mark from the back cover of the book Hunting Sea Monsters, 1927

In the early years of the German occupation, Jerzy Jabłonowski (former aide-de-camp to Marshal Józef Piłsudski) approached Irena Rybotycka with a request to use the publishing house's printer's mark displayed on the cover of the book Polowanie na potwory morskie (English: Hunting Sea Monsters) as a symbol of Poland's resistance against the occupant:

[Jerzy Jabłonowski]: You know... Poland is fighting – that's clear, but we still need our own symbol, emblem, crest, or recognizable sign, like a signature or seal. These two initials PW artistically intertwined as our own sign. Your company, Polish Publishing House, has the same initials WP as our PW. Look at your mark on the cover: the initials stylized into the shape of an anchor (an anchor is a symbol of hope). I can't imagine a better combination of these two letters, as on the cover of your book. What would you say if we used it as the emblem of Fighting Poland? Even the title of the book fits. After all, we're only hunting monsters in the name of historical justice.

— Irena Rybotycka, Znak Polski Walczącej

During the war, part of the Polish population unequivocally associated the graphic design of the Kotwica symbol with the printer's mark of Polish Publishing House. The similarity – even the identity – of both symbols also caught the attention of the Gestapo, who conducted a raid on the publishing house and ordered the obfuscation of the printer's mark in all books intended for distribution.

== Publisher's profile ==
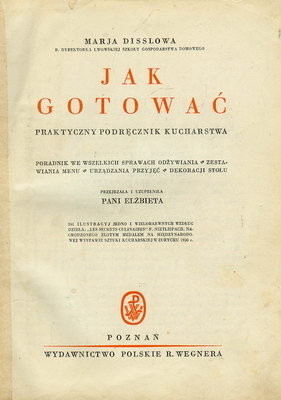
Maria Disslowa: Jak gotować (1931 or 1938)

The publishing house primarily focused on literature, both Polish and foreign. In its early years, it mainly published contemporary novels by Polish authors, including Jerzy Bandrowski, Marian Gawalewicz, Stefan Grabiński, Maria Rodziewiczówna, Wacław Sieroszewski, Jerzy Turnau, and Stanisław Wasylewski. Additionally, it released textbooks and books covering diverse topics such as veterinary science, agriculture, industry, and politics. Series with thematic focuses became a hallmark of the company's publishing plans. The first series, Gawędy o Dawnym Obyczaju. Wybór ciekawych pamiętników XVIII i XIX w. (English: Conversations on Old Customs: Selection of Interesting Memoirs from the 18th and 19th Centuries), began in 1920. The following year, Stanisław Lam initiated the editing of the extensive series Library of Nobel Laureates, which showcased the works of the most outstanding foreign writers from 1921 to 1939.

Children's literature was represented by series such as Książki Obrazkowe (English: Picture Books), Bajki i Baśnie (English: Fables and Fairy Tales), or the very popular Bajki Polskie Wujka Czesia (English: Polish Tales by Uncle Czesio) by Czesław Kędzierski. Numerous travel and adventure books were aimed at young adults, such as the series Świat Podróży i Przygód (English: World of Travel and Adventures).

Among the many books published outside of series, some notable titles include:

- Maria Disslowa's Jak gotować (English: How to Cook), Poznań, 1930, a comprehensive guide to cooking and entertaining.
- Complete works of:
  - Maria Rodziewiczówna – 36 volumes (during World War II, the publishing house obtained exclusive rights to publish the author's works)
  - Józef Weyssenhoff – only 3 volumes were released, numbers 1, 2, and 7.

Luxurious bibliophile albums included:

- Camille Mauclair's Florence translated by L. Staff, Lviv – Poznań, 1926.
- Jerzy Mycielski and S. Wasylewski's Polish Portraits of Elisabeth Vigée-Lebrun 1755–1842, Lviv – Poznań, 1927. The book with 24 illustrations produced by the heliograph technique was issued in an edition of 1,100 numbered copies, in a format of 31×24 cm, on handmade paper. This paper was supplied to the publishing house and bore watermarks from the manufacturer – Mirkowski Paper Factory. Two other editions of the book were also released in different formats, one on Chinese paper, and the other described as a "copy of the luxury edition" (1928).
- Joseph Gregor and René Fülöp-Miller's American Theater and Cinema: Two Images from the History of Culture translated by S. Wasylewski, Poznań, 1931.
- Franz Xaver Seppelt and Klemens Löffler's History of Popes, Poznań, 1936.

=== Publishing series ===
==== Conversations on Old Customs: Selection of Interesting Memoirs from the 18th and 19th Centuries ====
This was the first series of the Polish Publishing House, published in 1920–1930, and was compiled and edited by Stanisław Wasylewski.

==== Library of Nobel Laureates ====
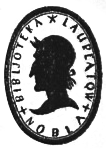
Logo of the series

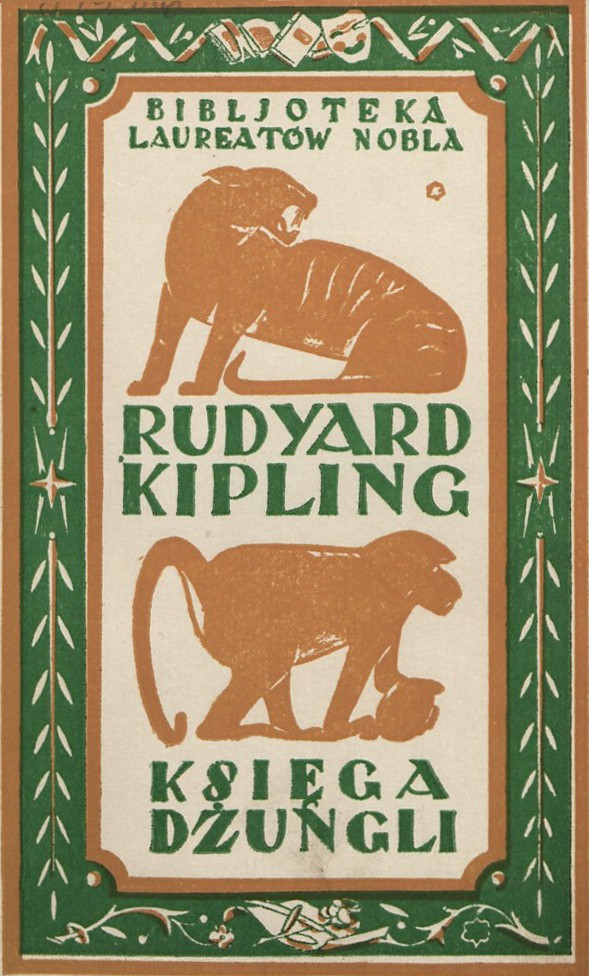
Rudyard Kipling: The Jungle Book (Polish edition from 1923)

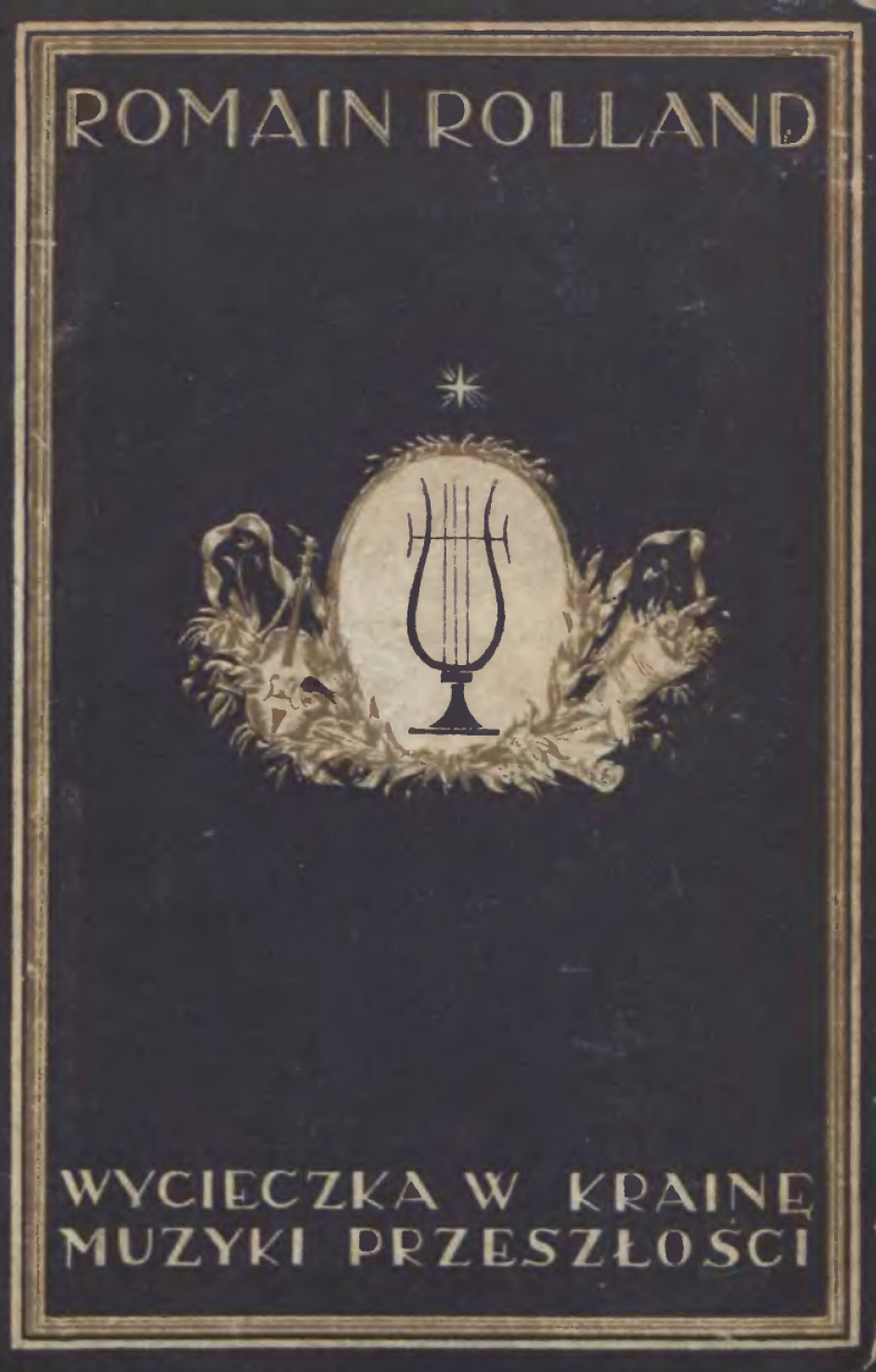
Romain Rolland: Musicians of the Past (Polish edition from 1924)

Polish Publishing House made its mark with the groundbreaking series titled Library of Nobel Laureates, initiated in 1921 with the publication of Romain Rolland's novel Colas Breugnon. The idea for the series stemmed from Wegner's observation that most authors he intended to publish in Polish translations were Nobel laureates. From 1921 to 1926, the series was edited by Stanisław Lam, with later editorial oversight by Stanisław Wasylewski. Tadeusz Lipski and Jan Marcin Szancer were responsible for the graphic design, while illustrations were executed by Ernest Czerper and Feodor Rojankovsky, and covers were designed by Edward Kuczyński. Translators included Józef Birkenmajer, Czesław Kędzierski, Leopold Staff, Jerzy Bandrowski, Florian Sobieniowski, Franciszek Mirandola, and Stanisław Wasylewski. This selection of translators and editors allowed for the publication of books that were not inferior in quality, appearance, or literary value to the originals. The thoughtful selection of authors and their works, along with the scale of the series, made it unique on a European scale. In Poland, which had only regained independence a few years earlier, the series was particularly valuable due to the very limited availability of foreign-language literature in Polish.

The series included works by the following Nobel laureates in literature:

- Maurice Maeterlinck – 11 titles, totaling 18 editions
- Knut Hamsun – 9 titles, totaling 15 editions
- Rudyard Kipling – 8 titles, totaling 15 editions (Polish Publishing House had exclusive rights to publish Kipling in Poland)
- Rabindranath Tagore – 8 titles, totaling 9 editions
- Selma Lagerlöf – 6 titles, totaling 9 editions (Note: Selma Lagerlöf was convinced that publishing her book in Poland would be scarce, and she waived her salary on the first edition.)
- Karl Gjellerup – 5 titles, totaling 8 editions
- Paul Heyse – 3 titles
- Henrik Pontoppidan – 3 titles, totaling 4 editions
- Romain Rolland – 3 titles, totaling 14 volumes and editions (Dusza zaczarowana was originally published in 3 volumes, later as one volume; Jan Krzysztof – 4 volumes)
- Bjørnstjerne Bjørnson – 2 titles, totaling 3 editions
- Carl Spitteler – 2 titles, totaling 3 editions
- Grazia Deledda – 2 titles
- Gerhart Hauptmann – 2 titles
- Stanisław Reymont – 1 title, 4 editions
- Jacinto Benavente – 1 title
- Rudolf Eucken – 1 two-volume title
- Anatole France – 1 title
- Verner von Heidenstam – 1 title
- Thomas Mann – 1 title
- George Bernard Shaw – 1 title
- William Butler Yeats – 1 title

By 1939, 80 volumes of the series had been published. All were numbered, had the same 8° format, graphic design, content layout on covers, and a unique graphic symbol. The entire edition was bound by the Przesławski i Cierniak Company, and in 1929, it was showcased at the Universal National Exhibition in Poznań.

After the war, some books from the series were reissued in Warsaw (1947–1950) and London. In 1992, Irena Rybotycka offered to waive royalties if the series were resumed and continued in Poland, under the condition that books include a note about Rudolf Wegner and the origin of the series.

==== Monographic studies ====
- Kowalska, Marzena (2008). "Literackie serie wydawnicze w latach 1921–1999". In Gaziński, Radosław (ed.). Dokąd Zmierzamy? Książka i jej czytelnik (PDF). Bibliotekarz Zachodniopomorski (in Polish). Vol. IV. Międzyzdroje: Książnica Pomorska im. Stanisława Staszica. pp. 109–126. ISBN 978-83-87879-70-9. Archived from the original (PDF) on 2013-06-01.

==== World of Travel and Adventures ====
The highly popular series World of Travel and Adventures was published from 1925 onwards, with Czesław Kędzierski serving as its editor. True to its title, the series featured travel and adventure novels, most often with a maritime theme. Authors included Robert Louis Stevenson, Mark Twain, James Fenimore Cooper, Edgar Allan Poe, and Ferdynand Ossendowski.

==== Epics and Legends ====
A short series published between 1926 and 1927, comprising 3 titles concerning St. Francis of Assisi, Antarah ibn Shaddad, and Buddha.

==== Library of Polish Authors ====
This series, started in 1928, was intended to present the works of young, contemporary Polish authors to readers. Among them were Jerzy Bandrowski, Jerzy Kossowski, Kornel Makuszyński, Stanisław Wasylewski, Ferdynand Ossendowski, Jan Wiktor, Maria Rodziewiczówna, and Julian Wołoszynowski. Within the series, books authored by Wacław Berent, Marian Gawalewicz, Ignacy Maciejowski, Adam Krechowiecki, and Aleksander Świętochowski were also reissued.

==== Monographs of Great Figures and Historical Periods ====
This series, published between 1928 and 1935, comprised 10 volumes containing monographs of historical figures, well-known Polish and foreign authors, as well as historical novels and studies. These included works on:

- Historical figures:
  - Emil Ludwig, Napoleon (translated by L. Staff), Poznań, 1928
  - Kazimierz Waliszewski, Catherine II (translated by S. Wasylewski), Poznań, 1929
  - Ferdynand Ossendowski, Lenin, Poznań, 1930
  - Louis Bertrand, Louis XIV (translated by S. Wasylewski), Poznań, 1931
- Literary figures:
  - Tadeusz Pini, Krasiński. Life and Works, Poznań, 1928
  - Stanisław Adamczewski, Insatiable Heart. Book about Żeromski, Poznań, 1930.
  - Andrzej Tretiak, Lord Byron, Poznań, 1930
- Historical periods:
  - Julian Wołoszynowski, The Year 1863, Poznań, 1931
  - Guglielmo Ferrero, The Greatness and Fall of Rome; Vol. 1 Conquest, Vol. 2 Julius Caesar (translated by L. Staff), Poznań, 1935

==== Wonders of Poland ====
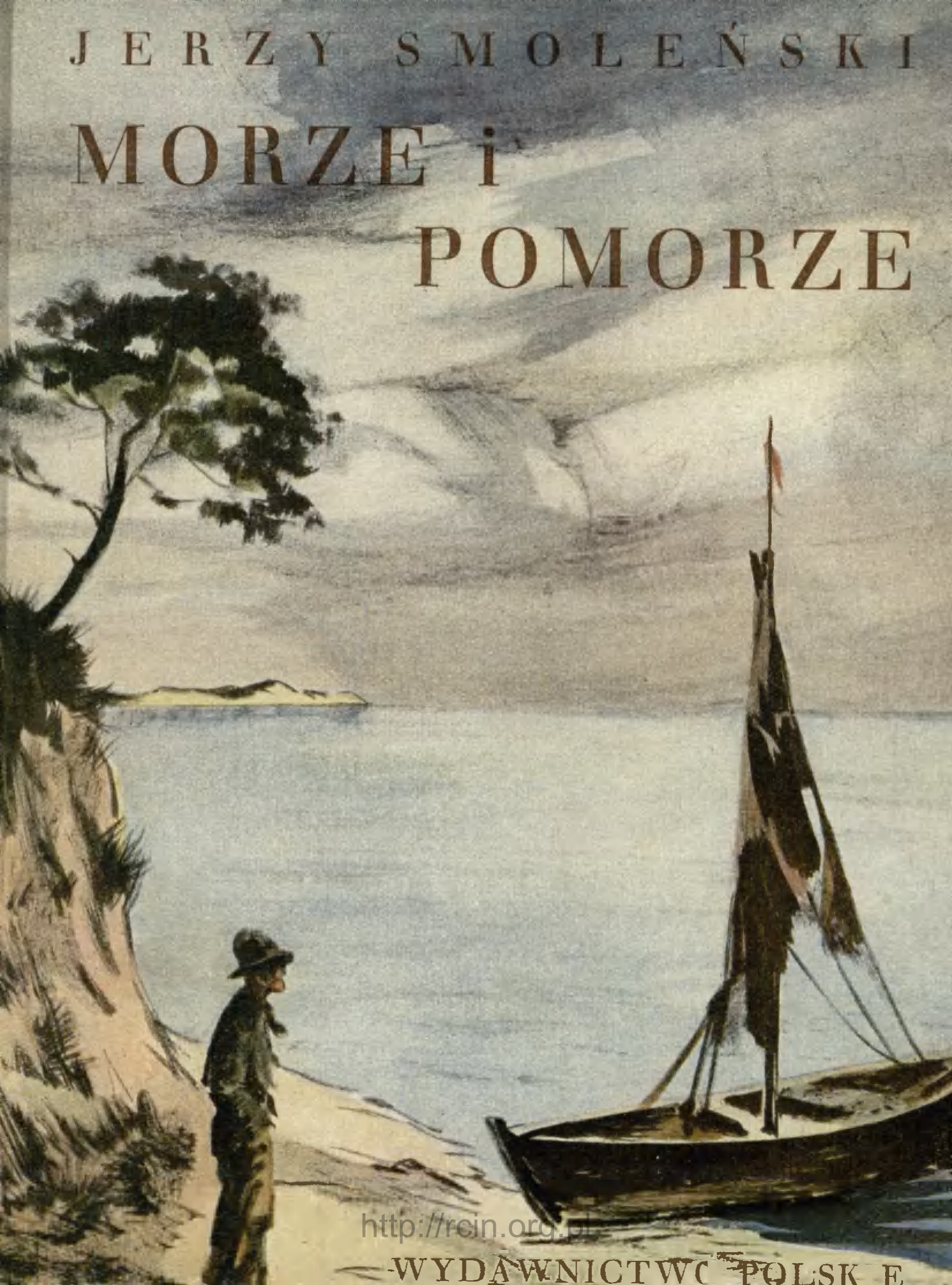
Jerzy Smoleński: Sea and Pomerania (1928)

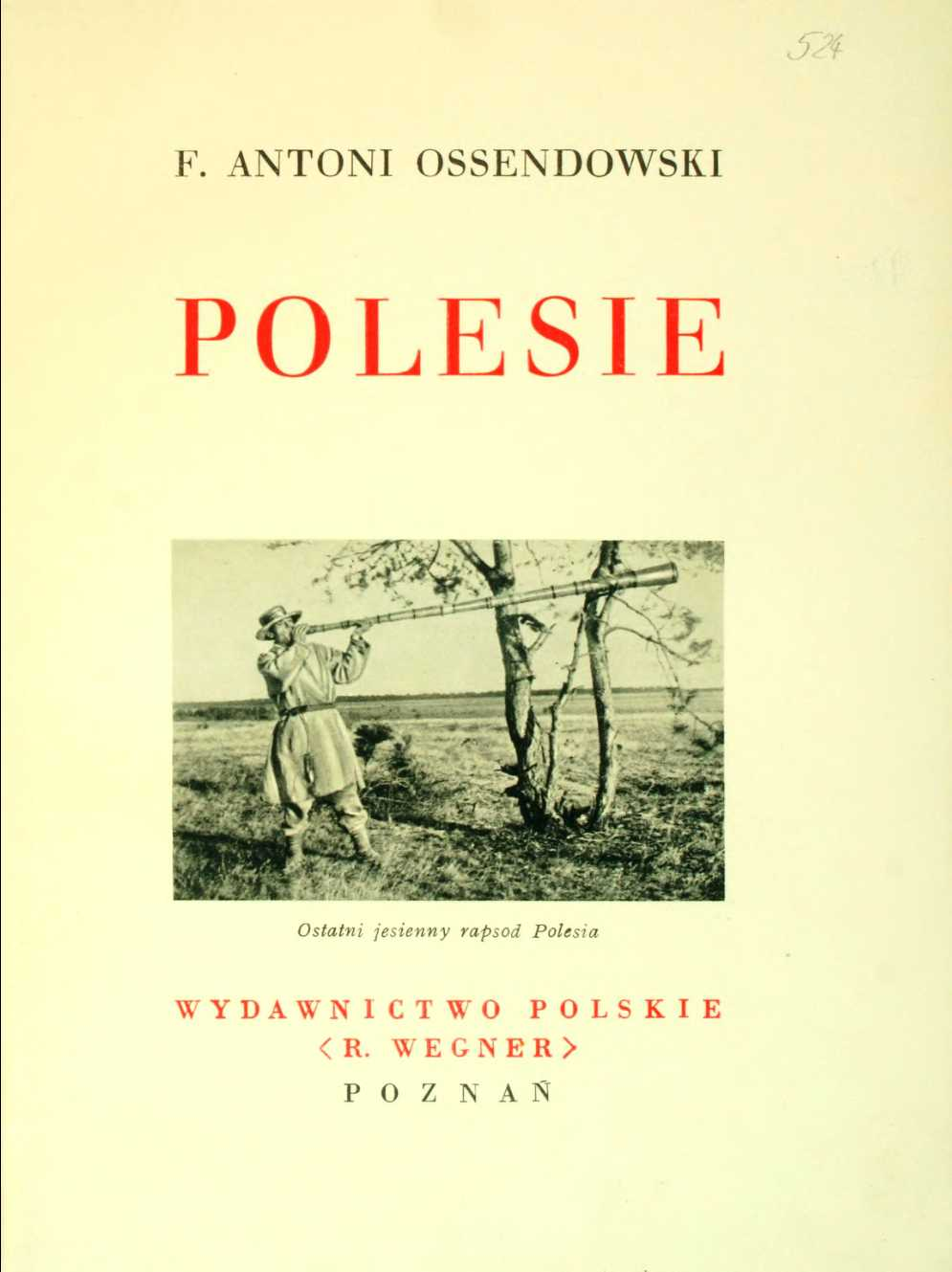
Ferdynand Ossendowski: Polesie (1934)

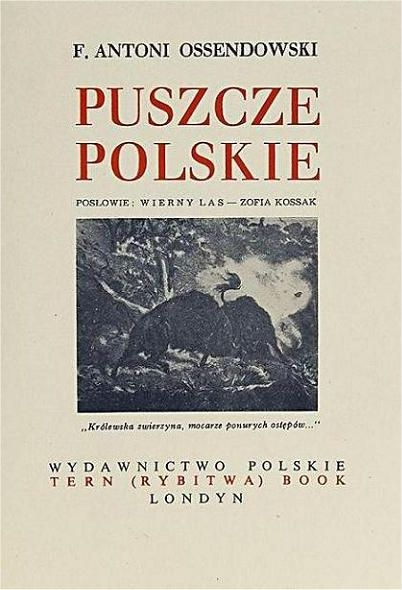
Ferdynand Ossendowski: Polish Forests (1936)

The full name of the series was Miracles of Poland – Natural Monuments – Monuments of Labor – Historical Landmarks (Polish: Cuda Polski – Pomniki Przyrody – Pomniki Pracy – Zabytki Dziejów) and it had a geographical character. Alongside the Library of Nobel Laureates, it was the prestigious and most popular series of the publishing house. It was the result of Wegner's extensive analysis of the global publishing market. The French Collection les Beaux Pays published by J. Rey in Grenoble had the greatest influence on the final shape of the series.

The motto of the series was This is Poland – our homeland (Aleksander Fredro). Its goal was to promote patriotic values in Poland, so the publishing house was not focused on financial gain in this case, and the books were distributed largely outside the market. Government agencies used Wonders of Poland (like the publisher's bibliophilic items) to create a positive image of Poland abroad. It began in 1928, planned for 20 volumes, and 14 were published before the outbreak of the war. In 1939, volume 15 titled Volhynia was being prepared.

The Wonders of Poland were produced with particular care and attractiveness. All volumes had a consistent format (21×16 cm), graphic layout designed by Jan Bułhak, and a style of binding (designed by Ernest Czerper) and illustrations. They were printed in uniform font on the same special wood-free paper. Bułhak was also responsible for preparing the photographs – many of his own – illustrating the books. They were produced using the labor-intensive heliography technique. The maps were authored by Rudolf Wegner's son-in-law, Colonel Tomasz Rybotycki. Jan Kilarski, Kamil Mackiewicz, Rafał Malczewski, Feodor Rojankovsky, and Leon Wyczółkowski's works were used for the covers. Each volume took about 4–6 years to prepare.

The production process was quite complex because printing was done by 4 different printing houses: Concordia in Poznań (text), Zakłady Graficzne Biblioteki Polskiej in Bydgoszcz (heliographic illustrations, rotogravure printing), and Saint Adalbert Printing House in Poznań and National Printing House in Kraków (covers).

The Wonders of Poland were highly popular, frequently reissued and reprinted, but the lack of volume numbering and publication dates complicates bibliographic analysis. The print runs of individual editions are also unknown. Selected volumes were reissued by units under the jurisdiction of the Polish government-in-exile (Lviv, Jerusalem 1944; Sea and Pomerania, Jerusalem 1946), and later by the Rybotycki couple, both in Nuremberg (fragments) and London (Polish Forests with an afterword Faithful Forest by Zofia Kossak about the Polish partisan movement 1940–1944, London 1953; Between the Niemen and the Dzvina with an afterword Faithful Land by Antoni Bogusławski, London 1955), as well as in Poland – through Anna Łempicka.

The series included 4 monographs of Polish cities and 10 monographs of regions:

- Cities:
  - Aleksander Janowski: Warsaw (1930)
  - Stanisław Wasylewski: Lviv (1931)
  - Jerzy Remer: Vilnius (1934)
  - Jan Kilarski: Gdańsk (1938), also published in English
- Regions:
  - Jerzy Smoleński: Sea and Pomerania (1928), also published in English
  - Jerzy Smoleński: Greater Poland (1930)
  - Gustaw Morcinek: Silesia (1933), also published in English
  - Ferdynand Antoni Ossendowski: Polesie (1934)
  - Rafał Malczewski: Tatra Mountains and Podhale (1935)
  - F. Antoni Ossendowski: Polish Forests (1936)
  - F. Antoni Ossendowski: Hutsul Region, Gorgany, and Chornohora (1936)
  - Aleksander Patkowski: Sandomierz Region. Świętokrzyskie Mountains (1938)
  - Tadeusz Łopalewski: Between the Niemen and the Dzvina. Vilnius and Novogrudok Region (1938)
  - F. Antoni Ossendowski: Carpathian Mountains and Subcarpathia (1939)
- Unpublished:
  - Ksawery Pruszyński: Volhynia
  - Stanisław Wasylewski: Polish Life in the 19th Century

During the Polish People's Republic era, books in the series concerning the Eastern Borderlands were put on an index. War losses were compounded by library policies, which disposed of "inconvenient" titles. Some books were also stolen, and the surviving copies are often damaged. As a result, books in good condition became very valuable, with auction prices for some series reaching up to 500 PLN in the early 21st century. Many volumes of the series were reissued after 1989 by several publishing houses, but the quality of these books differs significantly from the original versions.

==== Monographic studies ====
- Rausz, Monika (2006). ""Cuda Polski" Rudolfa Wegnera: historia edycji". Annales Universitatis Paedagogicae Cracoviensis Studia ad Bibliothecarum Scientiam Pertinentia (in Polish). 4: 156–166.
- Nowak, Adam (2008-12-12). ""Cuda Polski", czyli Rudolf Wegner rediviva". Wiadomości Księgarskie (in Polish). 57 (4): 80–85.

==== Collected Works by Maria Rodziewiczówna ====
The Polish Publishing House released all the works of the highly popular Maria Rodziewiczówna. By 1939, 36 volumes had been published. During the occupation, the publishing house obtained exclusive rights to publish the author's works. The books were reissued by the emigrant government during the war, and later by the Rybotyckis – in Nuremberg, London, and Warsaw.

==== Yellow Books ====
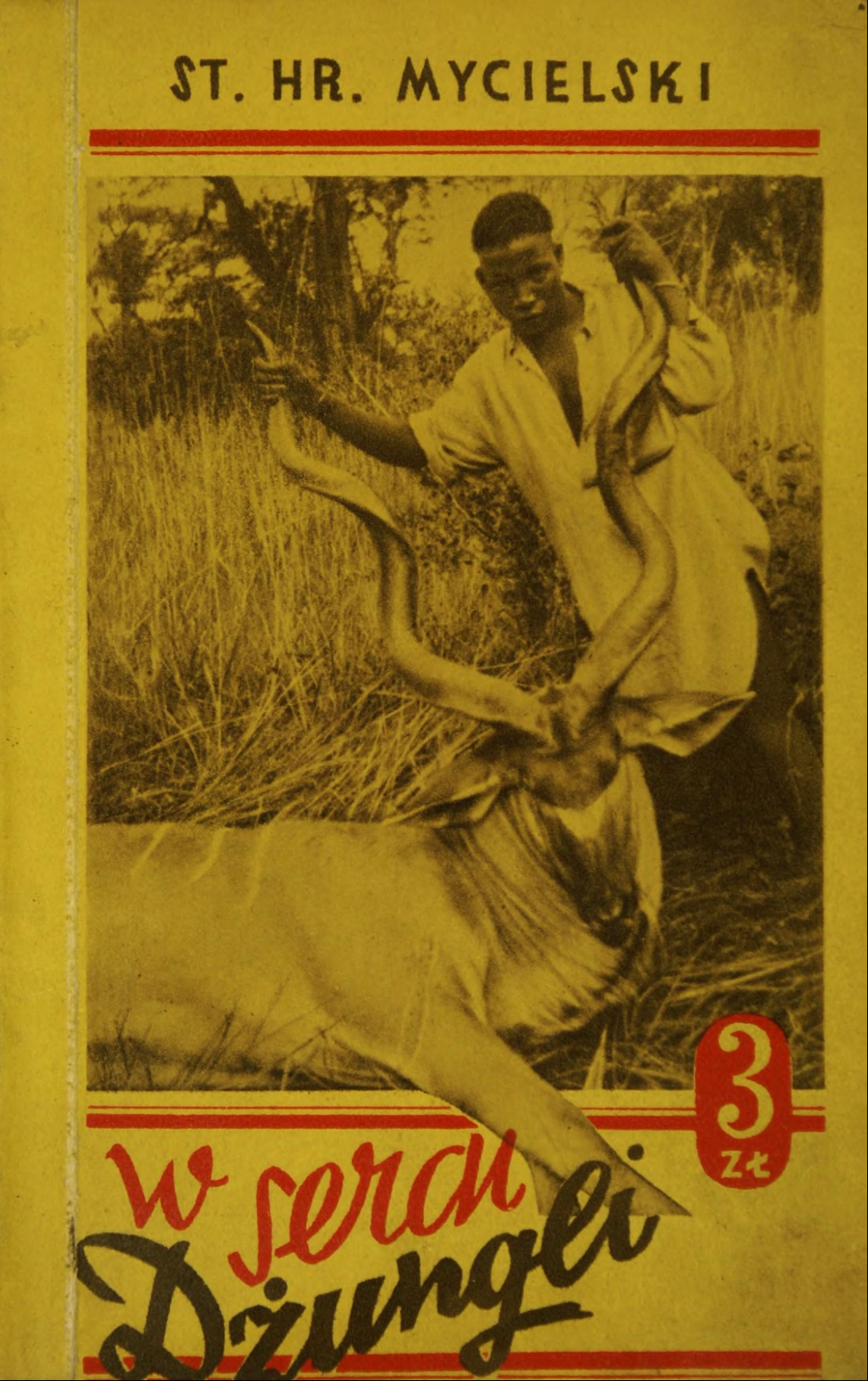
Stanisław Mycielski: In the Heart of the Jungle (1933)

This series consisted of cheaper crime novels by contemporary Polish and foreign authors, inspired by the German Die Gelben Bücher (Ullstein Verlag). Despite their lighter, often criminal themes, they were positively reviewed. Between 1928 and 1934, over 40 volumes were published in print runs of up to 10,000 copies. Unlike the publications discussed above, the Yellow Books were only available in paperback.

==== Film – Romance. Illustrated Novel Weekly ====
A series of 20 weekly volumes edited by F. Antoni Ossendowski, published in 1938. These short, 16-page brochures, priced at 0.20 PLN, illustrated with stills from films, popularized film works, especially foreign ones.

== Printing houses ==
The publishing house collaborated with the best Polish printing houses, allowing for the production of high-quality products. In Lviv, it utilized its own printing plant, the Polish Publishing House Press, since 1921. In Poznań, the main printing house for the publishing house became Concordia. Additionally, it collaborated with other printing establishments, including the Graphic Works of the Polish Library in Bydgoszcz, the Kraków-based National Printing House and Printing House of Ludwik Anczyc and Company, as well as several printing houses in Poznań: St. Adalbert Printing House, Printing House of "Poradnik Gospodarczy" of Jan Kuglin, Printing House of the Union of Youth, Polish Printing House, and Poznań Printing House and the National Plant T. A. Some illustrations were printed in Nuremberg. In post-war Poland, printing was mainly conducted at the Toruń Graphic Works. During the war, matrices of illustrations for children's books survived in Nuremberg, and possibly some matrices of the Wonders of Poland were taken from Poznań to Warsaw at the beginning of the occupation.

== Bibliography ==
- Szpinger, Stefan (1974). Na szerokiej drodze (in Polish). Łódź: Wydawnictwo Łódzkie.
