= Ferdynand Ossendowski =

Polish explorer and writer (1876–1945)

Ferdynand Antoni Ossendowski
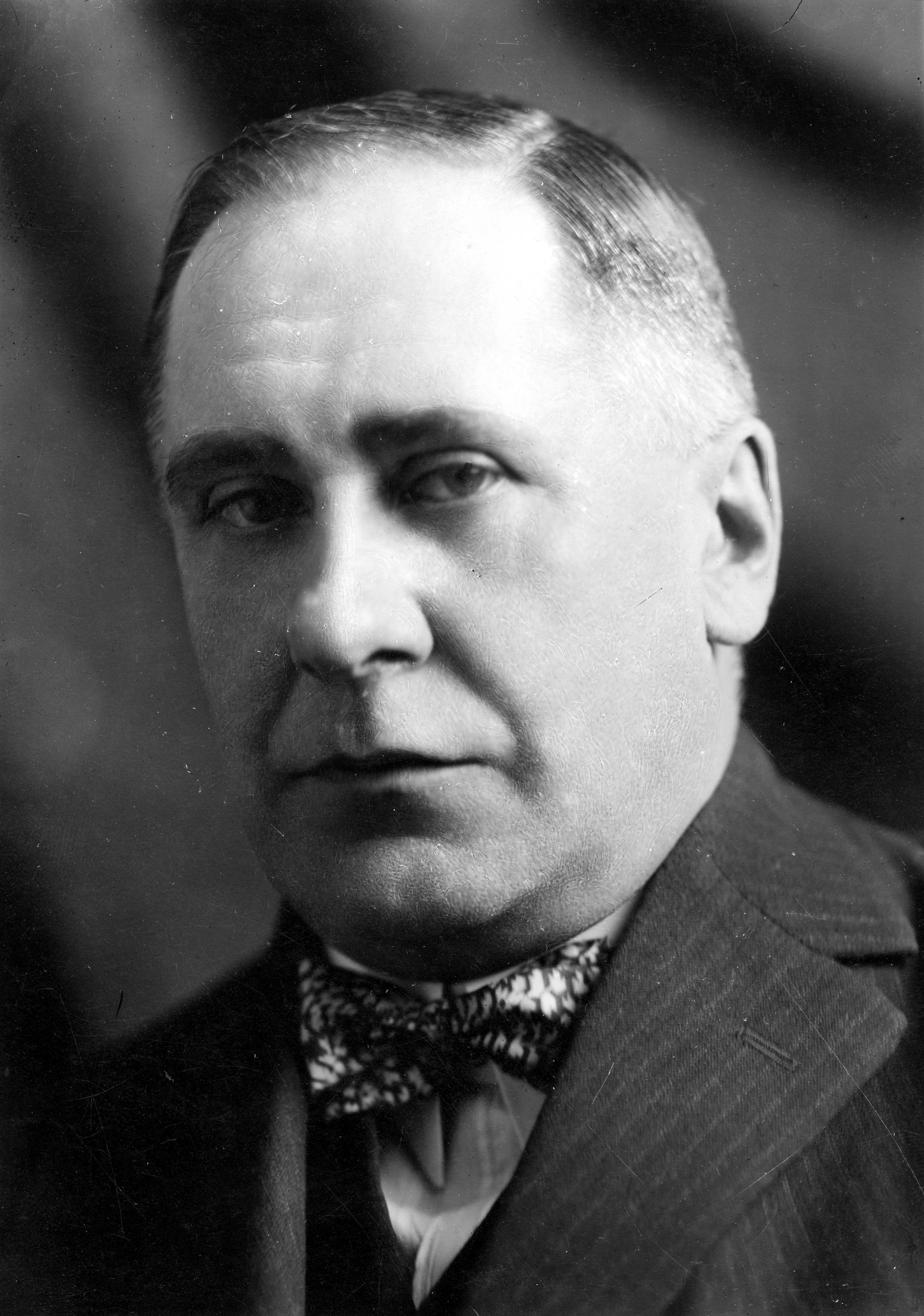
- Ossendowski in 1933
- Born: 27 May 1876; Ludza, Russian Empire (now Latvia)
- Died: 3 January 1945 (aged 68); Grodzisk Mazowiecki, Republic of Poland (Note: The information on the tombstone, which mentions Żółwin as his death place, is incorrect.)
- Resting place: Milanówek
- Occupations: Writer, journalist, traveler
- Writing career
- Language: Polish
- Notable works: Beasts, Men and Gods; Lenin; Cień Ponurego Wschodu

Ferdynand Antoni Ossendowski (Polish pronunciation: [fɛrˈdɨnant anˈtɔɲi ɔssɛnˈdɔfskʲi]; 27 May 1876 – 3 January 1945) was a Polish writer, explorer, university professor, and anticommunist political activist. He is known for his books about Lenin and the Russian Civil War in which he participated.

== Early years ==
Ossendowski was born on 27 May 1876, at his family's manorial estate near Ludza, in what was then the Vitebsk Governorate and is now Latvia. His family was Protestant with Lipka Tatar roots. He studied at the famous gymnasium in Kamieniec Podolski, but he moved with his father, a renowned doctor, to Saint Petersburg, where he graduated from a Russian language school. Then he joined the mathematical-physics faculty of the local university, where he studied chemistry. As an assistant to professor Aleksander Zalewski, he traveled to many distant areas, including Siberia, the Caucasus and the Altay Mountains. During the summer, he was frequently enrolled as a ship's writer on the Odessa-Vladivostok line, a job that allowed him to visit many parts of Asia, including Japan, Sumatra, China, Malaya and Indonesia. For his description of his trip to Crimea and Constantinople, he received his first royalty. His record of a trip to India (Chmura nad Gangesem: A Cloud Over the Ganges) gained the prestigious Petersburg Society of Literature prize.

In 1899, after a students' riot in Saint Petersburg, Ossendowski was forced to leave Imperial Russia and move to Paris, where he continued his studies at the Sorbonne, his professors being Maria Curie-Skłodowska and Marcelin Berthelot. It is possible that he received a doctorate back in Russia, but no documents have survived. In 1901 he was allowed to return to Russia, where professor Zalewski invited him to the newly founded Institute of Technology of the Tomsk State University. There, he gave lectures on chemistry and physics. At the same time he also gave lectures at the Agricultural Academy and published numerous scientific works on hydrology, geology, physical chemistry, geography and physics.

After the outbreak of the Russo-Japanese War (1904–1905) Ossendowski moved to Harbin in Manchuria, where he founded a Central Technical Research Laboratory, a Russian-financed institution for development of the ore deposits in the area. At the same time, he headed the local branch of the Russian Geographic Society in Vladivostok. As such he made numerous trips to Korea, Sakhalin, Ussuri and the shores of the Bering Strait. In Manchuria, he also became one of the leaders of the considerable Polish diaspora and published his first novel in Polish, Noc (Night). He also got involved in the Main Revolutionary Committee, a leftist organisation that tried to take power in Manchuria during the Revolution of 1905. After the failure of the revolution, Ossendowski organised a strike against the brutal repressions in Congress Poland for which he was arrested. A military tribunal sentenced him to death for conspiracy against the tsar, but his sentence was later commuted to several years' hard labour.

== St. Petersburg to China ==
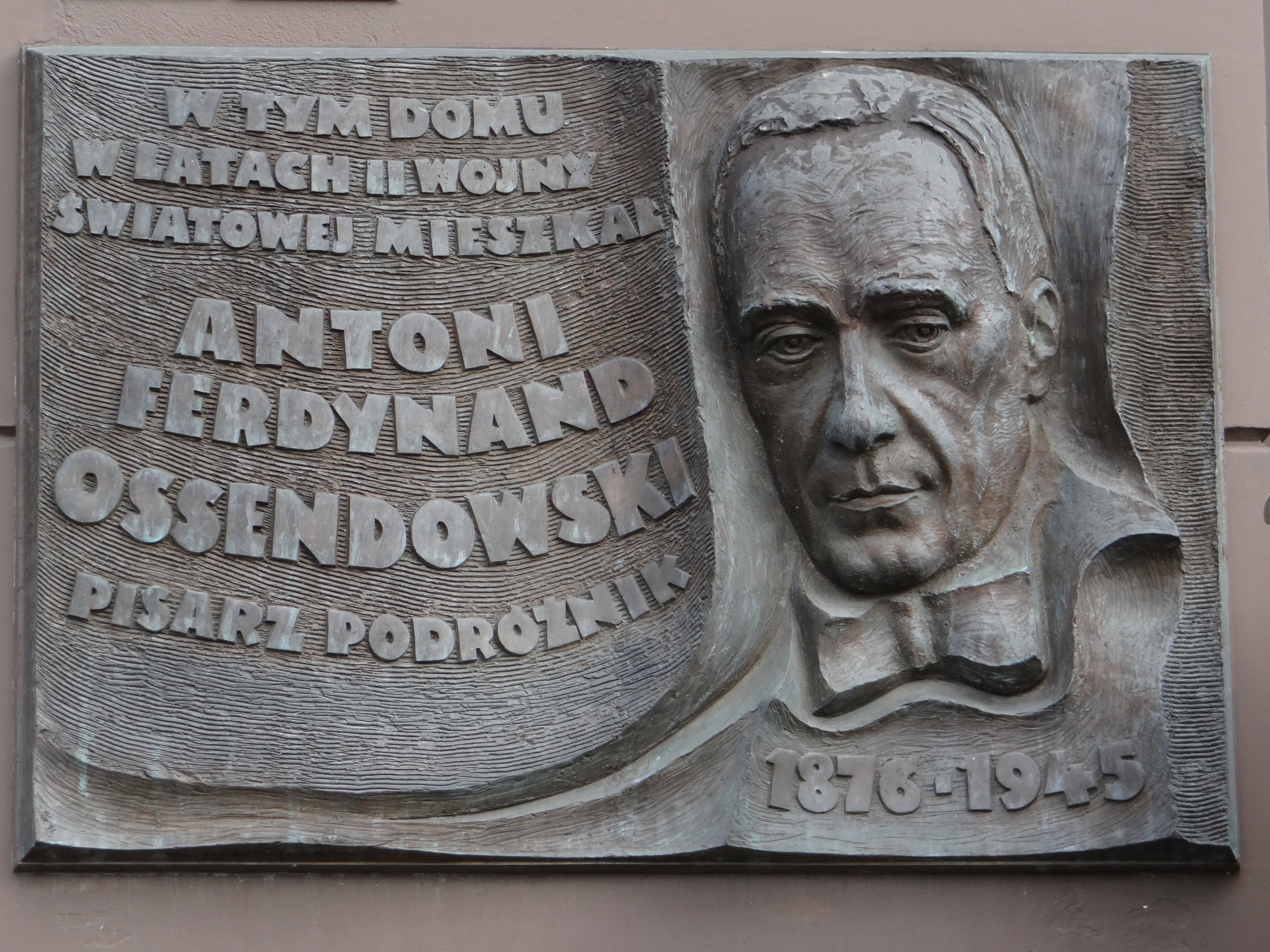
A plaque commemorating Ossendowski, Grójecka Street, Warsaw

In 1907, he was released from prison with a so-called wolf ticket, which prevented him from finding a job or leaving Russia. At that time he devoted himself to writing. His novel V ludskoi pyli (In Human Dust), in which he described his several years' stay in Russian prisons, gained him much popularity in Russia. His popularity allowed him to return to St Petersburg in 1908. There he continued to write books and at the same time headed the Society of the Gold and Platinum Industry and several newspapers and journals, both in Russian and in Polish. After the outbreak of World War I, Ossendowski published several more books, including a science fiction novel, a propaganda novel on German spies in Russia and a brochure describing German and Austro-Hungarian war crimes.

After the outbreak of the February Revolution of 1917, Ossendowski moved yet again, to Siberia, this time to Omsk, where he started giving lectures at the local university. After the October Revolution and the outbreak of the Russian Civil War, he also got involved in the counterrevolutionary Russian government led by Supreme Governor Admiral Aleksandr Kolchak. He served at various posts, among others as an intelligence officer, an envoy to the intervention corps from the United States and an assistant to the Polish 5th Rifle Division of Maj. Walerian Czuma. In 1918 he was responsible for the transfer of many tsarist and White Russian documents to the Entente, including proofs (many apparently forged) of German support (confirmed later from German archives) for Lenin and his Bolsheviks (so-called Sisson Documents).

After Kolchak's defeat in 1920, Ossendowski joined a group of Poles and White Russians trying to escape from communist-controlled Siberia to India through Mongolia, China and Tibet. After a journey of several thousand miles, the group reached Chinese-controlled Mongolia, only to be stopped there by the takeover of the country led by mysterious Baron Roman Ungern von Sternberg. The Baron was a mystic who was fascinated by the beliefs and religions of the Far East such as Buddhism and "who believed himself to be a reincarnation of Kangchendzönga, the Mongolian god of war." Ungern-Sternberg's philosophy was an exceptionally muddled mixture of Russian nationalism with Chinese and Mongol beliefs. However, he also proved to be an exceptional military commander, and his forces grew rapidly.

Ossendowski joined the baron's army as a commanding officer of one of the self-defense troops. He also briefly became Ungern's political advisor and chief of intelligence. Little is known of his service at the latter post, which adds to Ossendowski's legend as a mysterious person. In late 1920, he was sent with a diplomatic mission to Japan and then the US, never to return to Mongolia. Some writers believe that Ossendowski was one of the people who hid the semimythical treasures of Baron Roman von Ungern-Sternberg.

After his arrival in New York City, Ossendowski started to work for the Polish diplomatic service and possibly as a spy. At the same time, in late 1921 he published his first book in English: Beasts, Men and Gods. The description of his travels during the Russian Civil War and the campaigns led by the Bloody Baron became a striking success and a bestseller. In 1923, it was translated into Polish and then into several other languages.

== Back to Poland ==
In 1922, Ossendowski returned to Poland and settled in Warsaw. Immediately upon his return, he started giving lectures at the Wolna Wszechnica Polska, Higher War School and School of Political Sciences at the Warsaw University. At the same time, he remained an advisor to the Polish government and an expert sovietologist.

He continued to travel to different parts of the world, and after each journey he published a book or two. In the interwar period, he was considered the creator of a distinct genre called the traveling novel. With over 70 books published in Poland and translated almost 150 times into 20 other languages, Ossendowski was also the second most popular Polish author abroad, after Henryk Sienkiewicz. He repeated the success of his Beasts, Men and Gods with a book on Lenin in which he openly criticized Soviet communist methods and policies as well as the double face of the communist leaders. In Poland, three of his books were being filmed at the moment World War II started.

== World War II ==
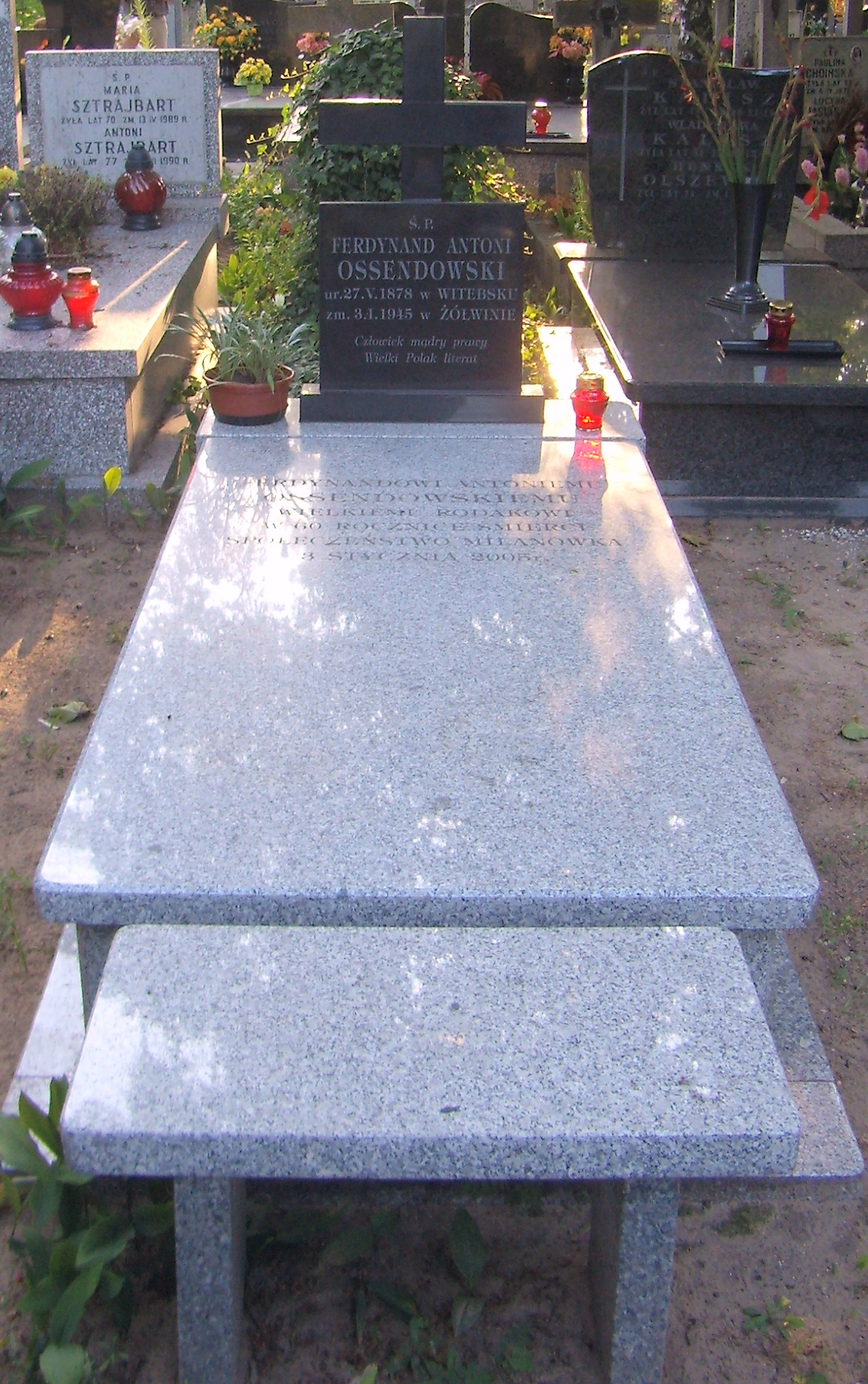
Ossendowski's grave in Milanówek

After the 1939 Invasion of Poland and the outbreak of World War II, Ossendowski remained in Warsaw, where he lived at 27 Grójecka Street. In 1942 he converted to Catholicism (previously being a Lutheran), and the following year, he joined the ranks of the underground National Party. He worked in the structures of the Polish Secret State and cooperated with the Government Delegate's Office in preparation of the underground education in Poland during World War II and postwar learning programmes.

After the Warsaw Uprising, Ossendowski, now seriously ill, moved to the village of Żółwin, near the Warsaw suburb of Milanówek. On 2 January 1945, he was taken to the hospital in Grodzisk Mazowiecki where he died on 3 January 1945. He was buried the following day in the local cemetery in Milanówek.

== Aftermath ==
Two weeks after Ossendowski's death, on 18 January, the area was seized by the Red Army. It turned out that Ossendowski was being sought by the NKVD, and was being considered an enemy of the people for his book on Lenin and the Soviet system, which was considered an act of anti-Soviet agitation. The Soviet agents exhumed his body to confirm his identity and that he was really dead.

After the war, the new communist Soviet-led authorities of Poland issued a ban on all books by Ossendowski. Many of his books were confiscated from the libraries and burnt. It was not until 1989 that his books were again published openly in Poland.

== Bibliography ==
The relative obscurity of much of Ossendowski's output means that many books have been published twice under different names or with no date of publication. The following list is an approximate and incomplete bibliography only.

- "Chmura nad Gangesem: A Cloud Over the Ganges"
- "Noc" (Night)
- "V ludskoi pyli" (In Human Dust)
- Beasts, Men and Gods. 1922. – 1922
- Black Magic of Mongolia – 1922
- "With Baron Ungern in Urga" – 1922
- Man and Mystery in Asia (PDF). Archived from the original (PDF) on 30 March 2016. – 1923
- From President to Prison – 1925
- The Shadow of the Gloomy East: A Moral History of the Russian People. E. P. Dutton & Company. 1925.– 1925
- The Fire of Desert Folk: The Account of a Journey Through Morocco. 1926. – 1926
- The Breath of The Desert: Oasis and Simoon: The Account of a Journey Through Algeria and Tunisia – 1927
- Slaves of the Sun: Travels in West Africa – 1928
- Life Story of a Little Monkey: The Diary of the Chimpanzee Ket – 1930
- Lenin: God of the Godless. 1931. – 1931
- Noc – Władywostok 1905
- W ludzkim pyle
- Cień ponurego Wschodu: za kulisami życia rosyjskiego – Warszawa 1923, Warszawa 1990
- W ludzkiej i leśnej kniei – Warszawa 1923
- Zwierzęta, ludzie, bogowie lub Przez kraj ludzi, zwierząt i bogów. Konno przez Azję Centralną – Warszawa 1923, Poznań 1927, repr. Białystok 1991, ISBN 83-85183-04-3.
- Cud bogini Kwan-Non: z życia Japonji – Poznań 1924
- Najwyższy lot – "Książki ciekawe", Warszawa 1923; Wydawnictwo Polskie R. Wegnera, Poznań 1929 (wydanie II), 1935 (wydanie III); reprint: Wydawnictwo LTW, Łomianki 2011, ISBN 978-83-7565-164-5
- Nieznanym szlakiem: nowele – Poznań 1924,.
- Za Chińskim Murem – Warszawa 1924
- Od szczytu do otchłani: wspomnienia i szkice – Warszawa 1925
- Orlica – Bibl. Dzieł Wyborowych, Warszawa 1925; kolejne wydania: Wydawnictwo Polskie R. Wegnera, Poznań 1928, 1929, 1930, 1932, Norymberga 1948; reprint: Iskry, Warszawa 1957
- Po szerokim świecie – Warszawa 1925
- Toreador w masce i inne opowieści – Poznań 1925
- Zbuntowane i zwyciężone – Warszawa 1925
- Czarny czarownik: relacja z wyprawy do Afryki – Warszawa 1926
- Płomienna Północ – Wydawnictwo Polskie, Lwów 1926, 1927
- Pod smaganiem samumu. Podróż po Afryce Północnej. Algierja i Tunisja – Wydawnictwo Polskie, Poznań 1926, Lwów 1927
- Huragan – Warszawa 1927
- Niewolnicy słońca: podróż przez zachodnią połać Afryki podzwrotnikowej w l. 1925/26 r. – Wydawnictwo Polskie R. Wegnera, Poznań 1927, 1928
- Wśród Czarnych – Lwów 1927
- Na skrzyżowaniu dróg: nowele i szkice – Tczew 1928
- Pięć minut po północy – Wydawnictwo Polskie R. Wegnera, Poznań 1928
- Pod polską banderą – Lwów 1928
- Sokół pustyni – Poznań 1928 – na jej podstawie nakręcono film kinowy Głos pustyni (1932)
- Szkarłatny kwiat kamelii – Poznań 1928
- Wańko z Lisowa – Lwów 1928
- Życie i przygody małpki – Lwów 1928
- Krwawy generał – Wydawnictwo Polskie (R. Wegner), Poznań 1929; reprint: Agencja Wydawnicza "BS", Warszawa 1990
- Lisowczycy: powieść historyczna – Wydawnictwo Polskie R. Wegnera, Poznań 1929; reprint: Libra, Warszawa 1990
- Męczeńska włóczęga – Wydawnictwo Polskie (R. Wegner), Poznań 1929; reprinty: "Słowo", Warszawa 1986, Agencja Wydawnicza "BS", Warszawa 1990
- Przez kraj szatana – Wydawnictwo Polskie (R. Wegner), Poznań 1929; reprint: Agencja Wydawnicza "BS", Warszawa 1990
- Lenin – Wydawnictwo Polskie R. Wegnera, Poznań 1930 (3 wydania), liczne tłumaczenia, reprinty: Wydawnictwo Alfa, 1990, ISBN 83-7001-354-6, Wydawnictwo Maj, 1990, Wydawnictwo LTW 2011, ISBN 978-83-7565-132-4
- Mali zwycięzcy: przygody dzieci w pustyni Szamo – Lwów 1930, Warszawa 1991, repr. Gdańsk [1991]
- Miljoner „Y”: powieść o dzielnym Murzynku-sierocie – Warszawa [ok. 1930]
- Nieznanym szlakiem – Wydawnictwo Polskie R. Wegnera, Poznań 1930
- Czao-Ra – Warszawa 1931
- Gasnące ognie: podróż po Palestynie, Syrji, Mezopotamji – Wydawnictwo Polskie R. Wegnera, Poznań 1931
- Trębacz cesarski – Miejsce piastowe [1930]
- Zagończyk – Lwów 1931
- Zwierzyniec – Wydawnictwo Polskie R. Wegnera, Poznań 1931
- Okręty zbłąkane – Kraków 1932
- Syn Beliry – Warszawa 1932, następne wydania pt. Tajemnica płonącego samolotu
- Daleka podróż boćka – Warszawa 1932
- Narodziny Lalki – Warszawa 1932
- Przygody Jurka w Afryce – Warszawa 1932
- Słoń Birara – Kraków 1932, Warszawa 1958 i 1990, a także ok. 2006 jako szósty tom kolekcji „Cała Polska Czyta Dzieciom”
- Staś emigrant – Warszawa 1932
- W krainie niedźwiedzi – Warszawa 1932
- Afryka, kraj i ludzie – Warszawa 1934
- Polesie – Wydawnictwo Polskie R. Wegnera, seria Cuda Polski, Poznań 1934
- Pożółkły list – Warszawa 1934
- Mocni ludzie – Lwów, Warszawa [1935], Wrocław, Warszawa [ok. 1946]
- Nauczycielka – Poznań 1935
- Skarb Wysp Andamańskich – Warszawa 1935
- Tajemnica płonącego samolotu – Warszawa 1935, pierwsze wydanie z 1932 jako Syn Beliry
- W polskiej dżungli – Warszawa 1935
- Aldo – Wydawnictwo Polskie R. Wegnera, Poznań 1936
- Bajeczki niebajeczki – Częstochowa 1936
- Czarnoskórka – Wydawnictwo Polskie R. Wegnera, Poznań 1936
- Dimbo – Wydawnictwo Polskie R. Wegnera, Poznań 1936
- Drobnoludki i inne dziwy – Częstochowa 1936
- Grzmot – Wydawnictwo Polskie R. Wegnera, Poznań 1936
- Huculszczyzna: Gorgany i Czarnohora – Wydawnictwo Polskie R. Wegnera, seria Cuda Polski, Poznań 1936; reprint Zakład Narodowy im. Ossolińskich, Wrocław 1990, ISBN 83-04036-39-8
- Iskry spod młota – Poznań 1936
- Kosmacz – Wydawnictwo Polskie R. Wegnera, Poznań 1936
- Kraczka – Wydawnictwo Polskie R. Wegnera, Poznań 1936
- Kruszenie kamienia – Wydawnictwo Polskie R. Wegnera, Poznań 1936
- Miś i Chocha – Wydawnictwo Polskie R. Wegnera, Poznań 1936
- Ogień wykrzesany – Wydawnictwo Polskie R. Wegnera, Poznań 1936
- Popielatka – Wydawnictwo Polskie R. Wegnera, Poznań 1936
- Puszcze polskie – Wydawnictwo Polskie R. Wegnera, seria Cuda Polski, Poznań 1936; Wydawnictwo Tern (Rybitwa) Book, Londyn 1953; reprint: Sejneńskie Towarzystwo Opieki Nad Zabytkami, 2008, ISBN 83-922743-4-2
- Rudy zbój – Wydawnictwo Polskie R. Wegnera, Poznań 1936
- Szympansiczka – Wydawnictwo Polskie R. Wegnera, Poznań 1936
- W krainie niedźwiedzi – Warszawa, 1932 i wydania kolejne, 1935–1939
- Młode wino – Warszawa 1937
- Postrach gór – Warszawa 1937
- Szanchaj – Wydawnictwo Polskie R. Wegnera, Poznań 1937
- Biesy – Poznań 1938
- Orły podkarpackie – Przemyśl 1938
- Pierścień z krwawnikiem – Kraków 1938
- Pod sztandarami Sobieskiego – Warszawa 1938
- Zygzaki – Poznań 1938
- Biały kapitan – Wydawnictwo Polskie R. Wegnera, Poznań 1939; reprint Oficyna Cracovia Kraków 1990
- Cztery cuda Polski – Warszawa 1939
- Karpaty i Podkarpacie – Wydawnictwo Polskie R. Wegnera, seria Cuda Polski, Poznań 1928, 1939; reprint Libra, ISBN 83-89183-30-7
- Jasnooki łowca – Kraków 1946
- Wacek i jego Pies – Poznań 1947
- Dzieje burzliwego okresu (od szczytu do otchłani) – Wydawnictwo Polskie (R. Wegner), Poznań [ok. 1934]
- Cadyk ben Beroki – Białystok 1992, ISBN 83-85174-19-2.

== See also ==
- Sławomir Rawicz
- Tiziano Terzani
- Roman von Ungern-Sternberg
- Polish-Mongolian literary relations
