= Boris Vladimirtsov =

Russian scientist (1884–1931)

- Борис Яковлевич Владимирцов
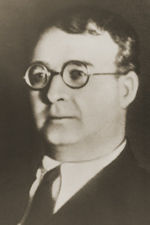
- Born: 20 July 1884; Kaluga, Russian Empire
- Died: 17 August 1931 (aged 47); Siverskaya, Leningrad Oblast, USSR
- Education: St. Petersburg University (1909)
- Awards: Academician of the Academy of Sciences of the USSR (1929)
- Scientific career
- Fields: Oriental studies, Mongolian studies, Linguistics, Ethnography
- Workplaces: Leningrad University
- Doctoral students: Nicholas Poppe

Boris Yakovlevich Vladimirtsov (Russian: Борис Яковлевич Владимирцов; 20 July [O.S. 8 July] 1884 – 17 August 1931) was a Russian and Soviet orientalist, Mongolist, and linguist. He became a member of the Academy of Sciences of the USSR in 1929. Vladimirtsov was a specialist in Mongolian linguistics and literature, as well as the history and ethnography of the Mongolian peoples.

== Life and career ==
In 1909, Vladimirtsov graduated from the Faculty of Oriental Languages at St. Petersburg University (Chinese-Manchu section). He remained at the university to work in the Department of Mongolian and Kalmyk Literature.

His mentors in Mongolian studies were Andrey Rudnev (1878–1958) and Władysław Kotwicz (1872–1944). He also studied under Vasily Radlov and Vasily Bartold. Vladimirtsov received broad scientific training: he studied comparative historical linguistics of Indo-European languages, attended lectures on the history of the Russian language by Aleksey Shakhmatov (1854–1920), comparative linguistics by Jan Niecisław Baudouin de Courtenay, and philosophy by Fyodor Shcherbatskoy.

In 1911, after receiving his master's degree, he traveled to the Kobdo district of Western Mongolia to collect information on the languages of the Derbets and Bayads, a task he had begun as a student. From 1911 to the autumn of 1915, with a brief interruption, Vladimirtsov conducted linguistic and ethnographic research while traveling through Western and Central Mongolia. He returned to St. Petersburg with extensive materials on Mongolian dialects, epics, shamanism, and Buddhism, as well as a large collection of Mongolian and Oirat books.

He began preparing publications while simultaneously lecturing at the university and organizing the collection of Mongolian-Oirat manuscripts at the Asiatic Museum of the Academy of Sciences. In December 1918, Vladimirtsov was awarded the academic title of professor.

Prior to his magnum opus Comparative Grammar of the Mongol Written Language and the Khalkha Dialect (1929), he published notable works such as the article co-authored with Nicholas Poppe, "On the Vocalism of the Mongol-Turkic Proto-Language" (1924).

Vladimirtsov was one of the first to understand the importance of studying later borrowings in Mongolian and Turkic languages, which are mutual and bidirectional. This perspective was influenced by Vasily Radlov's Dictionary of Turkic Dialects (completed in 1911), which noted many Mongolian loanwords in Turkic languages. Vladimirtsov devoted his article "Turkish Elements in the Mongolian Language" (1911) to this issue. In his article "On Two Mixed Languages of Western Mongolia" (1923), he described situations of language mixing, providing a clear example distinct from the lexical and morphological similarities found generally in the Altaic family.

He died on August 17, 1931, at his dacha in Siverskaya (Gatchinsky District). He was buried at the Smolensky Lutheran Cemetery in Saint Petersburg.

== Scientific legacy ==
In his book Comparative Grammar of the Mongol Written Language and the Khalkha Dialect (1929), Vladimirtsov outlined the main trends in the evolution of Altaic languages: the loss of medial and final vowels, changes in consonant groups, transformations of diphthongoid combinations, and variations in vowel and consonant reflexes across language groups. He also identified deviations from standard correspondences. His attempts to reconstruct Proto-Altaic vocalism retain their value. Assuming the genetic relationship of Altaic languages, his work on identifying mutual borrowings between Mongolian and Turkic languages and distinguishing them from common Altaic vocabulary is of great significance. According to A. A. Burykin, Vladimirtsov used a theoretical apparatus in his work comprising elements of historical phonology (specifically accounting for changes in auxiliary morphemes and their influence on phoneme changes in root morphemes), placing him far ahead of his colleagues, especially Turkologists, even in subsequent generations.

Vladimirtsov's book The Social System of the Mongols: Mongolian Nomadic Feudalism (1934) received positive evaluations from Soviet orientalists, although it was labeled "not entirely Marxist." Its undoubted merits include the author's use of a vast number of Mongolian primary sources, which he understood not only as a historian but also as a linguist and philologist. His extensive time spent as a "field researcher" in Mongolia allowed him to grasp nuances in these materials that were impossible to understand through cabinet study alone. The diversity of documents and facts covered in this monograph made it a handbook for specialists in the history of nomadic societies during the feudal era.

== Bibliography ==
Boris Vladimirtsov's scientific legacy consists of 69 publications. Notable collected works include:

- Vladimirtsov, B. Y. (2002). Works on the History and Ethnography of the Mongolian Peoples [Работы по истории и этнографии монгольских народов]. Classics of Russian Oriental Studies. Moscow: Vostochnaya Literatura. ISBN 5-02-018184-6.
- Vladimirtsov, B. Y. (2003). Works on the Literature of Mongolian Peoples [Работы по литературе монгольских народов]. Classics of Russian Oriental Studies. Moscow: Vostochnaya Literatura. ISBN 5-02-018185-4.
- Vladimirtsov, B. Y. (2005). Works on Mongolian Linguistics [Работы по монгольскому языкознанию]. Classics of Russian Oriental Studies. Moscow: Vostochnaya Literatura. ISBN 5-02-018186-2.
