= Polish–Mongolian literary relations =

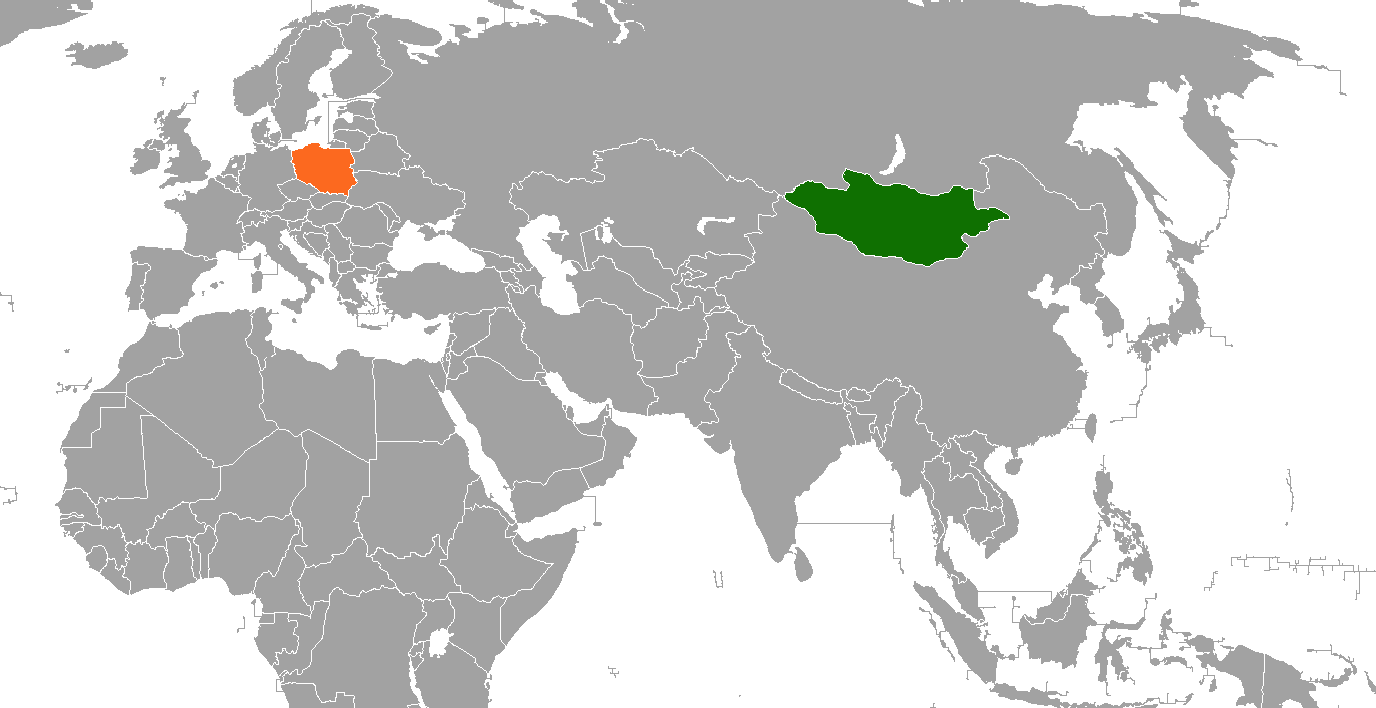
Location of Mongolia and Poland in Eurasia

Polish–Mongolian literary relations are the interrelationships between Polish and Mongolian literature that date to the late Middle Ages. There are also links between Polish and Mongolian philology and literary studies. Their first manifestations were reports about Mongols in the Polish chronicles and in the relations of medieval Polish travelers to Asia. Knowledge about Mongolia in Poland became more vivid in the 19th century, when many Polish adventurers, prisoners in Siberia (see sybirak), learned people and businessmen of the part of Poland under Russian rule engaged heavily in Siberian, Mongolian, and Chinese affairs. Interest in Polish matters in Mongolia is smaller and dates mainly to the 20th century. There are also literary works (mainly adventure novels) about Mongolia in the Polish literature and a few translations of Polish literature into Mongolian, or Mongolian literature into Polish.

== Early works ==
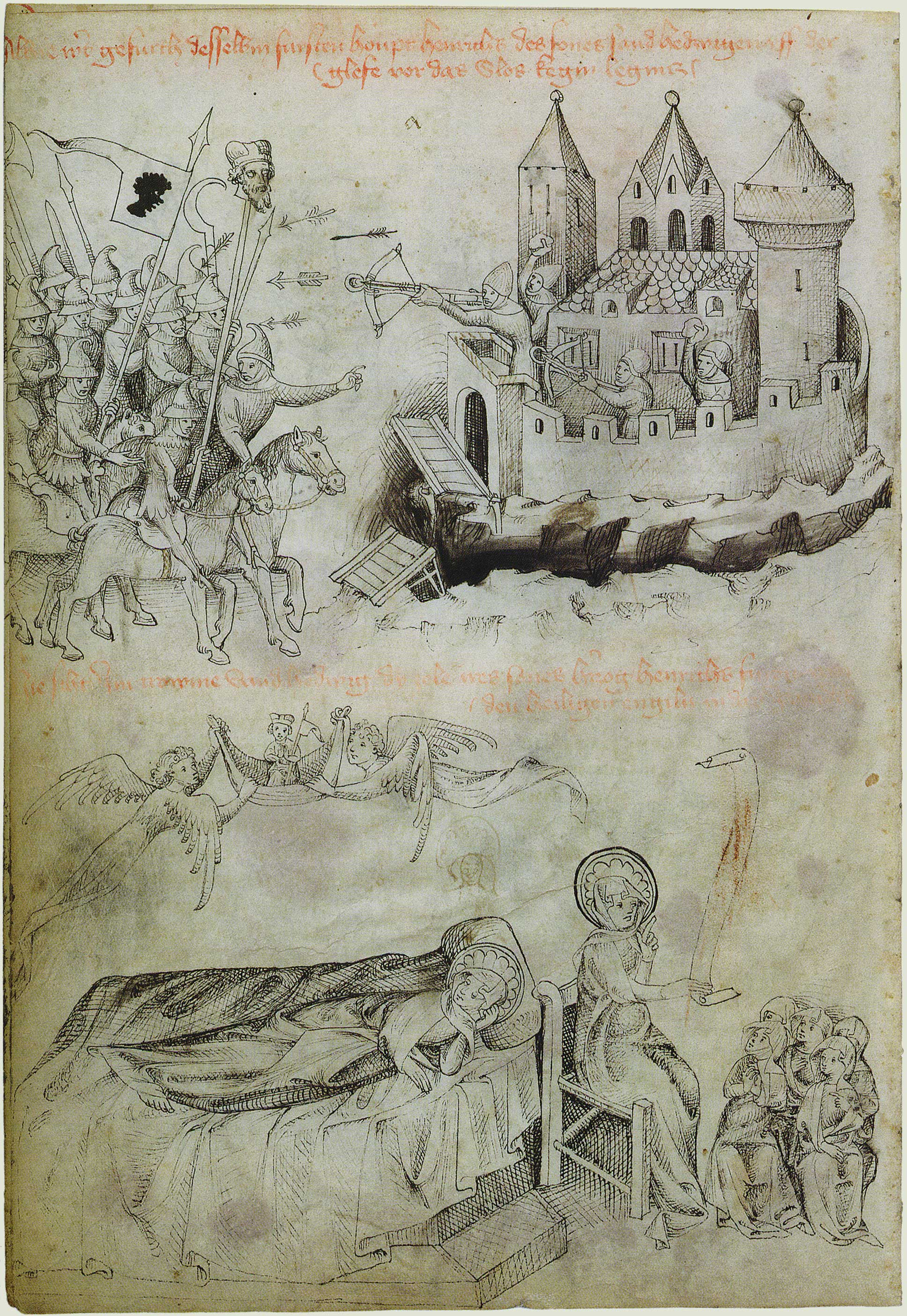
The Mongols at Legnica. A medieval manuscript about the legend of Jadwiga, 1451. Wrocław University Library

There are numerous mentions of the Mongols in the writings of virtually all Polish chroniclers, notably Jan Długosz. From the 15th to the 18th centuries, Mongolian affairs were connected or identified in Poland directly with the severe devastation wrought on the country by the Mongol invasions from 1240–1241, 1259–1260 and 1287–1288. Mongol tumen under Orda Khan devastated most of central Poland, besieged and sacked Lublin, Sandomierz, Wolbórz, Łęczyca, then turned south towards Sieradz and Wrocław. All the while, the armies of Baidar and Kadan ravaged the southern part of Poland including Chmielnik, the royal city of Kraków, Bytom, Opole, Legnica and others. Panic spread through the Polish lands. In 1259, mere 18 years after the first attack, two tumens of 40,000 men from the Golden Horde under the leadership of Berke, attacked Poland again. Most towns in Galicia and Volhyinia were burned to the ground. The Rus soldiers under Daniel's son, Lev, and brother, Vasily, joined the Mongol expedition. Here's where the Mongolian affairs became connected and identified in Poland with the Tatar issues. More death and destruction was unleashed on the cities of Lublin, Sieradz, Sandomierz, Zawichost, Kraków and Bytom. The Golden Horde remained very important in the literary tradition of Poland dating back to the Middle Ages. It inspired such works as a treatise on the origin of the Tatars by Mikołaj Rozembarski (1499).

Until the 19th century Polish–Mongolian relations were sporadic. Some of the earliest European mentions about the life, history and culture of the Mongols come from the travel reports from the journey to the Great Khan in the years 1245–47, written by Franciscan friars, members of the expedition prepared by the pope Innocent IV and headed by Giovanni da Pian del Carpine. One of the members of this expedition was Benedict of Poland. He wrote a short account of his journey, De Itinere Fratrum Minorum ad Tartaros. An author of the more extensive account of this journey, based on Benedict's oral narrative, Hystoria Tartarorum, was C. de Bridia, probably also a Pole. Hystoria Tartarorum contains an important description of the Battle of Legnica, one of the most important events during the first Mongol invasion of Poland.

== 19th century ==
The first nineteenth-century Polish traveler to Mongolia was Jan Potocki (1761–1815), who visited Mongolia during his journey to China and wrote a travel report in French (Polish translation Podróże, 1959). The father of the Polish Mongolian philology was Józef Kowalewski, who visited Mongolia several times (1829, 1831–33). Kowalewski was a former filomata, a friend of Adam Mickiewicz, a professor of Mongolian philology at the University of Kazan, an author of several works devoted to very diverse aspects of Mongolian culture and language, often pioneering. His most important work is a Mongolian–Russian–French dictionary in three volumes (1844–49). Polish research on the geography and culture of Mongolia intensified after the January Uprising, when many Poles became political prisoners in neighboring Siberia – one of the most famous among Poles participating in the research expeditions to Mongolia was Aleksander Czekanowski.

== 20th century ==
World-famous among turkologists and mongolists was a Polish scholar Władysław Kotwicz, author of many works devoted to Mongolia and Mongolian literature, the discoverer (1912) of the old-Mongolian stone inscriptions in the Erdene Zuu Monastery. Other well-known Polish mongolists were Marian Lewicki, Stanisław Kałużynski and Stanisław Godziński. Lewicki prepared editions of many monuments of the classical Mongolian literature.

In 20th-century Mongolia there was interest in Polish literature, strengthened by the fact that both communist Mongolia and communist Poland belonged to the same political bloc. Many translations of Polish literary works into Mongolian were published, although they were usually translated indirectly, through the Russian language. Especially a large number of Polish children's literature was translated into Mongolian. However, most of these texts were published in magazines and not as books. Some Mongolian citizens studied Polish philology at Polish universities. Some translators translated literary works directly from Polish into Mongolian. Among the most important were D. Biambaa (poems of Władysław Broniewski and Konstanty Ildefons Gałczyński), B. Bandi (Polish folk literature), P. Biambasan and D. Kim (novels by Ewa Szelburg-Zarembina). The most important translator was Byambyn Rinchen (1905–77): writer, historian, ethnographer and linguist, who translated into Mongolian many main literary works of many world literatures, including (directly from Polish) works of Adam Mickiewicz, Wanda Wasilewska, Jarosław Iwaszkiewicz and Jerzy Andrzejewski. There are translations of his ethnographical books into Polish.

The number of translations of contemporary Mongolian literature into Polish is not very big. As in the case of translations from Polish to Mongolian, many texts were translated through the Russian language. To the most important belong Opowiadania mongolskie [Mongolian Stories] by Tsendiin Damdinsüren (1953), Wiersze [Poems] by Begzin Yavuuhulan (1962) and the novel Przejrzysty Tamir [The Crystal Clear Tamir River] by Chadraabalyn Lodoidamba (1980). Translations directly from Mongolian were published mainly in the orientalist journal Przegląd Orientalistyczny, for example poetry and prose of Dashdorjiin Natsagdorj translated by Stanisław Godziński and Adam Latusek. Godziński translated also a selection of Mongolian epic poetry and chronicles (W kręgu lamajskich legend i mitów [Among lamaist legends and myths], 1981). To the most important translators of the classic Mongolian literature belongs Stanisław Kałużynski. He prepared Głosy z Jurty [Voices of the yurts] (1960) – a selection of Mongolian riddles, parables, proverbs, etc.; Tajna historia Mongołów (1970), a translation of the anonymous thirteenth-century Mongolian chronicle The Secret History of the Mongols; Tradycje i legendy ludów Mongolii [Traditions and legends of the peoples of Mongolia] (1978), which include excerpts from the seventeenth-century chronicle Erdeniin Tobchi and Mongolian folk epic poetry. Among Polish writers, whose works were affected by the culture of Mongolia, were Wacław Sieroszewski – especially his novel Dalaj Lama [The Dalai Lama] (1927) and its versions for children W niepodległej Mongolii [In the independent Mongolia] (1937); Ferdynand Antoni Ossendowski – especially his travel novel Przez kraj ludzi, zwierząt i bogów [In the country of people, animals and gods] (1923); Kamil Giżycki (Przez Urianchaj i Mongolię, 1929); Przecław Smolik, an author of the story on the life of Buryats Wśród wyznawców Burchan-Buddhy [Among the believers of Burchan-Buddha] (1925).

== Bibliography ==
- Ludwik Bazylow, Historia Mongolii, Wrocław 1981
- Adam Latusek, chapter Mongolia of the article Orient, in: Literatura polska. Przewodnik encyklopedyczny, vol. 2, Warszawa 1985
- Jerzy Strzelczyk (ed.), Spotkanie dwóch światów. Stolica Apostolska a świat mongolski w połowie XIII wieku. Relacje powstałe w związku z misją Jana di Piano Carpiniego do Mongołów, Poznań 1993
- Robert Urbański, Tartarorum gens brutalis. Trzynastowieczne najazdy mongolskie w literaturze polskiego średniowiecza na porównawczym tle piśmiennictwa łacińskiego antyku i wieków średnich, Wydawnictwo IBL PAN, Warszawa 2007, "Studia Staropolskie. Series Nova", vol. XV (LXXI)
