= Józef Nusbaum-Hilarowicz =

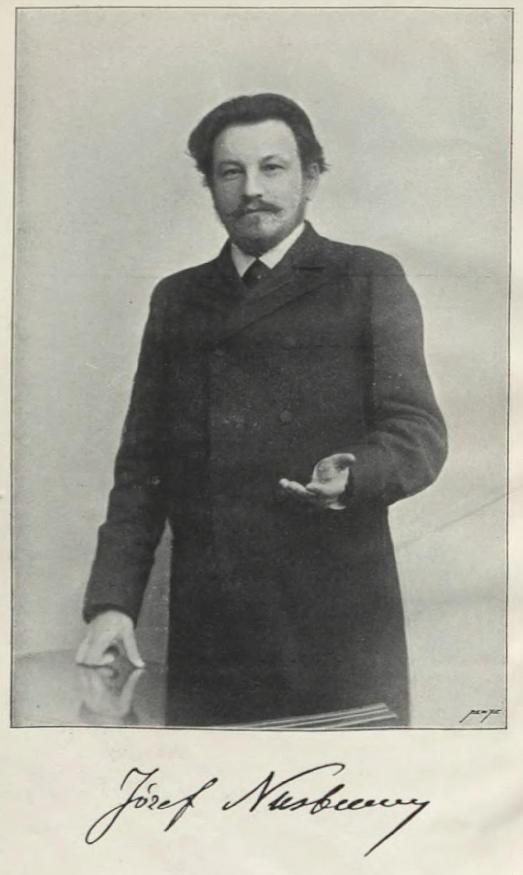

Józef Nusbaum-Hilarowicz (December 11, 1859 – March 17, 1917) was a Polish zoologist who helped establish an evolutionary approach to the study of zoology in Lviv.

Nusbaum was born in Warsaw in the Jewish-origin family of industrialist Hilary Nusbaum and Ewa née Tenenbaum. His brother Henryk Nusbaum became a neurologist. He went to the classical high school in Warsaw and in 1878 joined the Russian Imperial University of Warsaw and received a master's degree in 1886 from the University of Odessa under the guidance of Aleksandr Kovalevsky and Ilya Mechnikov. He received PhD in comparative anatomy from the University of Warsaw in 1888 and habilitated at Lviv under Benedykt Dybowski on comparative anatomy and embryology. He became a professor of anatomy at the veterinary academy at the University of Lviv from 1894. He translated Darwinian ideas into Polish and influenced a school of more than 40 zoologists including Benedykt Fuliński, Jan Grochmalicki, Jan Hirschler, Antoni Jakubski, and Rudolf Weigl. After the retirement of Dybowski in 1906, he resigned from the veterinary academy and moved to the department of zoology, and in 1907 he converted to Catholicism and adopted his name grandfather's name as Nusbaum-Hilarowicz.

He married naturalist Rozalia (1859–1933) and their son Henryk Hilarowicz who became a professor was killed along with several Lviv professorsby the Nazis in the Wuleckie Hills on July 4, 1941. Another son Tadeusz (1887-1958) became a law professor.
