= Antoni Jakubski =

Officer of the Polish Army, Polish zoologist

Antoni Władysław Jakubski (Polish pronunciation: [anˈtɔɲi vwaˈdɨswaf jaˈkupskʲi]; 1885–1962) was a Polish zoologist and explorer.

Jakubski was born in Lemberg (Lwów), Galicia, Austria-Hungary (now Lviv, Ukraine) on 28 March 1885. He studied zoology from Prof. Józef Nusbaum-Hilarowicz at the Lwów University where he received a habilitation in 1917. In 1909–1910, he traveled to East Africa, becoming, on 13 March 1910, the first Pole to climb Mount Kilimanjaro. He crossed Tanganyika on foot, traveling from the Indian Ocean to the lakes Nyasa and Rukwa in order to study their fauna.

During the First World War, Jakubski fought in the Polish Legions. For his military service, he was awarded with a fifth class Virtuti Militari order and a Cross of the Valiant. From 1919 to 1939, he worked at the Poznań University. In 1923, he set up the Maritime Fishing Laboratory at Hel on the Baltic Sea. After the Second World War, during which he was an inmate of Nazi concentration camps, Jakubski settled in the United Kingdom where he was employed in the British Museum. He died in London on 20 May 1962.

Jakubski's area of research comprised faunistics, zoogeography, comparative anatomy and history of zoology. His works include:

- W krainach słońca ["In the lands of the sun"], 1914 – an account of his African journey
- Czerwiec polski ["Polish cochineal"], 1934 – a monograph on the Polish cochineal
- Bibliografia fauny polskiej do roku 1880 ["Bibliography of Polish fauna until 1880"] (with M. Dyrdowska), 1928
