= Rafał Malczewski =

Polish painter and mountaineer (1892–1965)

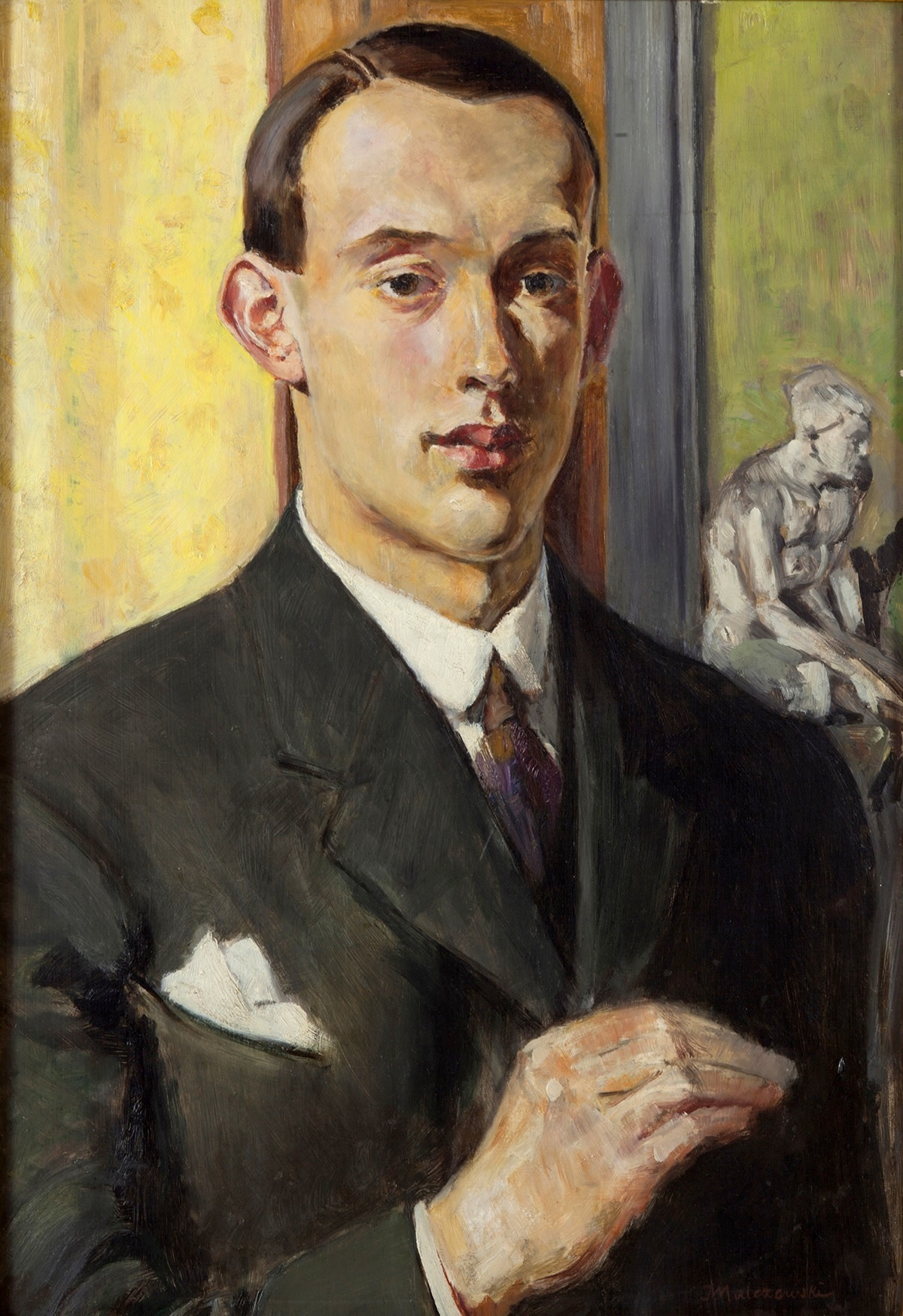
- Portrait by Jacek Malczewski, c. 1912
- Born: 24 October 1892; Kraków, Kingdom of Galicia and Lodomeria
- Died: 15 February 1965 (aged 72); Montreal, Canada
- Father: Jacek Malczewski

Rafał Marceli Ludwik Fortunat Józef Malczewski (24 October 1892 – 15 February 1965) was a Polish landscape and portrait painter, draughtsman, author and columnist. He was a noted Tatra mountaineer, skier and populariser of the Tatra Mountains.

== Life ==
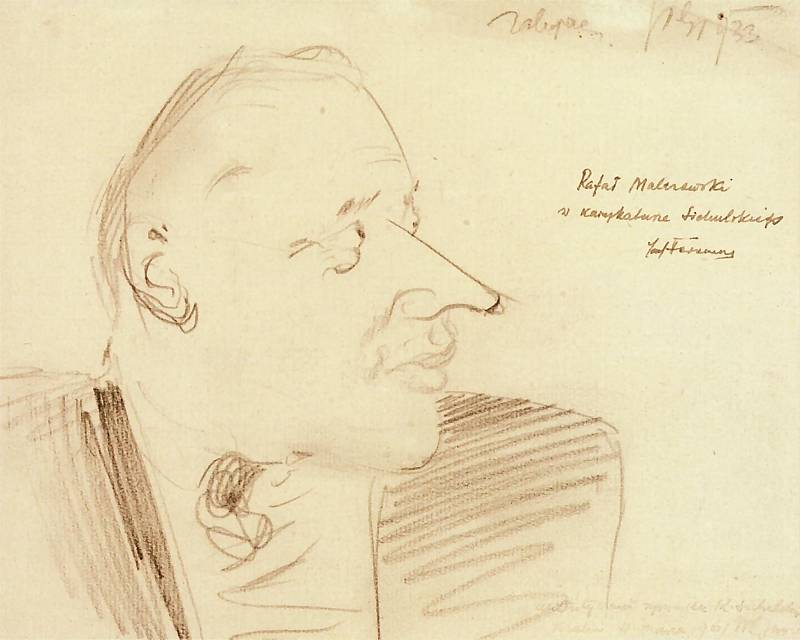
1923 Cartoon of Malczewski by Kazimierz Sichulski

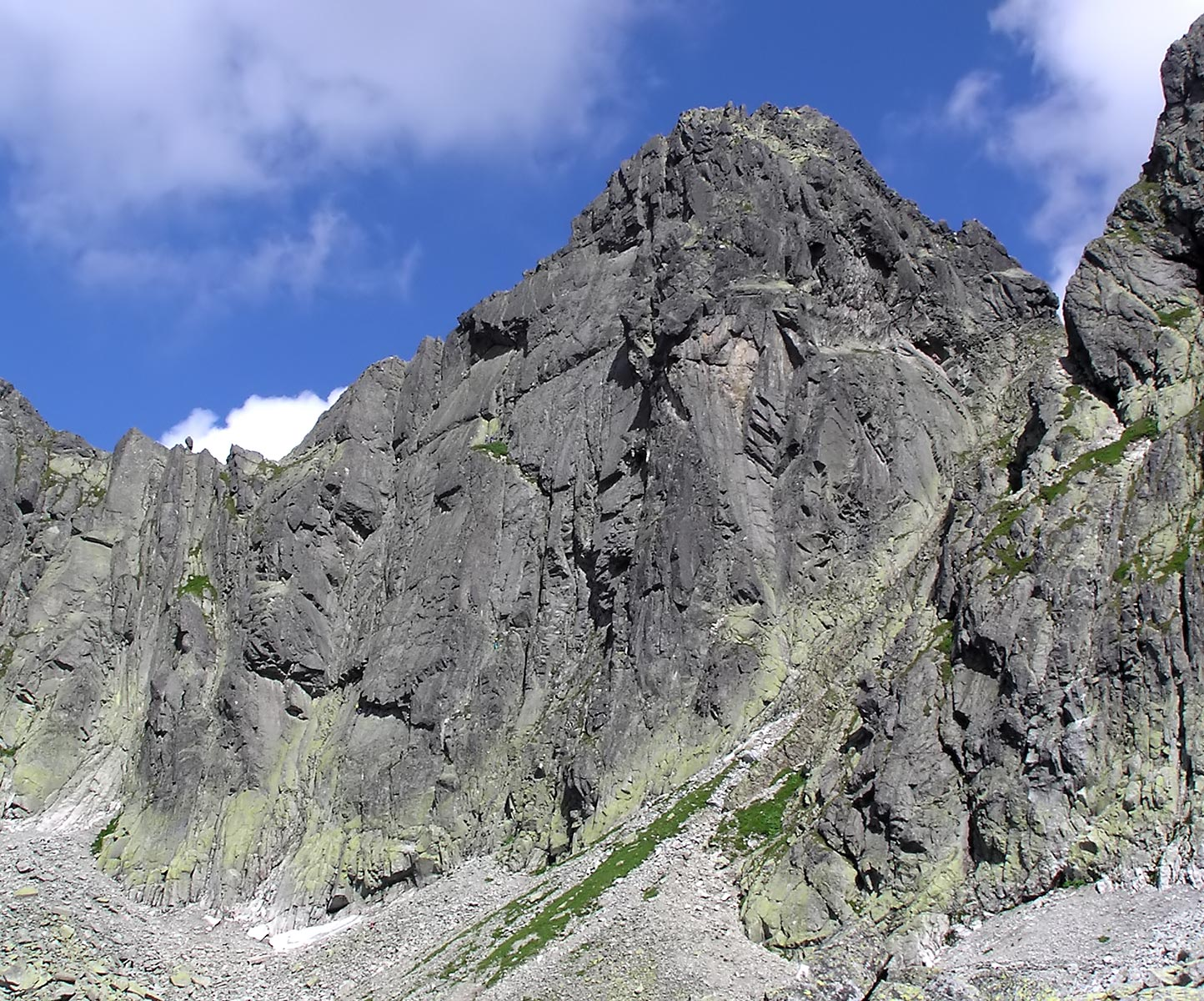
South face of Zamarła Turnia in the Tatra Mountains

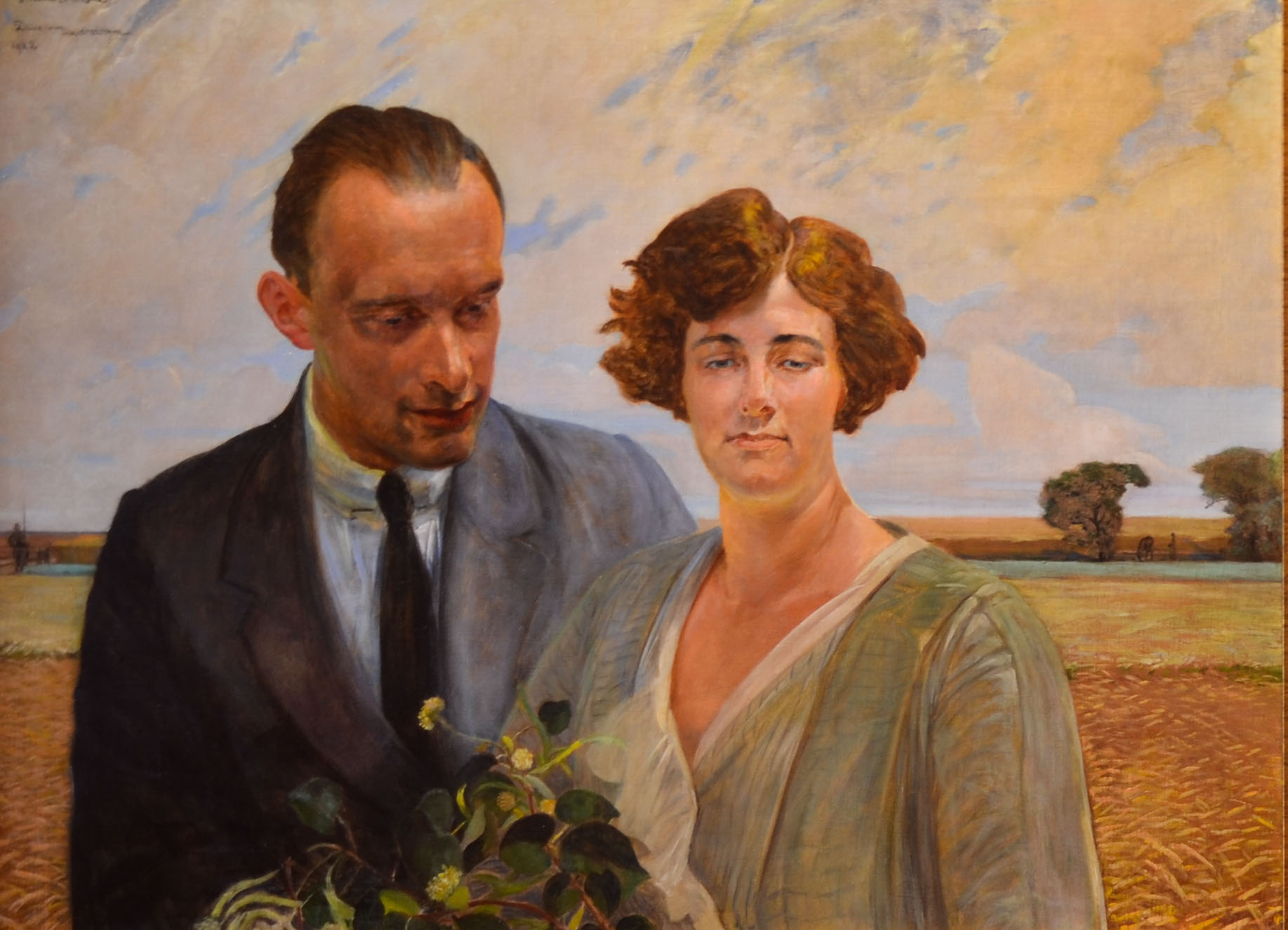
Rafał with his wife, Bronia in 1922 painted by his father, Jacek

He was born in Kraków, four years after his sister, Julia, the son of Maria, née Gralewska, and her husband the celebrated Symbolist painter and professor of Fine Art, Jacek Malczewski. He graduated from the Saint Jacek High School in the city. From 1910 to 1915, he studied at the University of Vienna. He took courses in philosophy, architecture and agronomy. On his return to Kraków he entered the Jan Matejko Academy of Fine Arts, and was also apprenticed in his father's studio. In 1915 he began to travel frequently to Zakopane where he spent extensive periods, to climb, ski and paint, until the outbreak of World War II. He joined the local Mountain rescue team, TOPR. However, in 1917 on the south face of "Zamarła Turnia" he and his climbing companion, Stanisław Bronikowski, were caught in a climbing accident in which his friend died, while Malczewski clung to a hook all night awaiting rescue.

In October 1917, he married Bronisława Dziadosz, an English teacher four years his senior and a US citizen of Polish descent who had immigrated into Poland. In November of the same year, their son Krzysztof was born. Despite an unhappy partnership, the couple went on to have a second child, Zofia. Their poor financial situation led to Rafał's artist father helping them out. In 1923, he bought for them a chalet called "Marysin".

Rafał Malczewski was an associate and friend of a group of artists, musicians and intellectuals who would congregate in the Mountain resort of Zakopane in the early part of the 20th century. They included Stanisław Ignacy Witkiewicz, Karol Szymanowski, Kornel Makuszyński, and Jarosław Iwaszkiewicz. In 1932, he joined the "Rhythm" Association of artists (Stowarzyszenie Artystów Polskich "Rytm") and was a set designer for productions of Strindberg and Stanisław Witkiewicz at the Formistyczny Theatre in Zakopane. In 1937, he was awarded the "Wawrzyn Akademicki" award from the Polska Akademia Literatury "for services to Polish art". In 1938, he donated part of his artistic output to the newly re-opened National Museum of Warsaw to which, several years earlier on account of his material difficulties, he had sold the entirety of his father's work left to him by Malczewski Sr.

== Travels ==
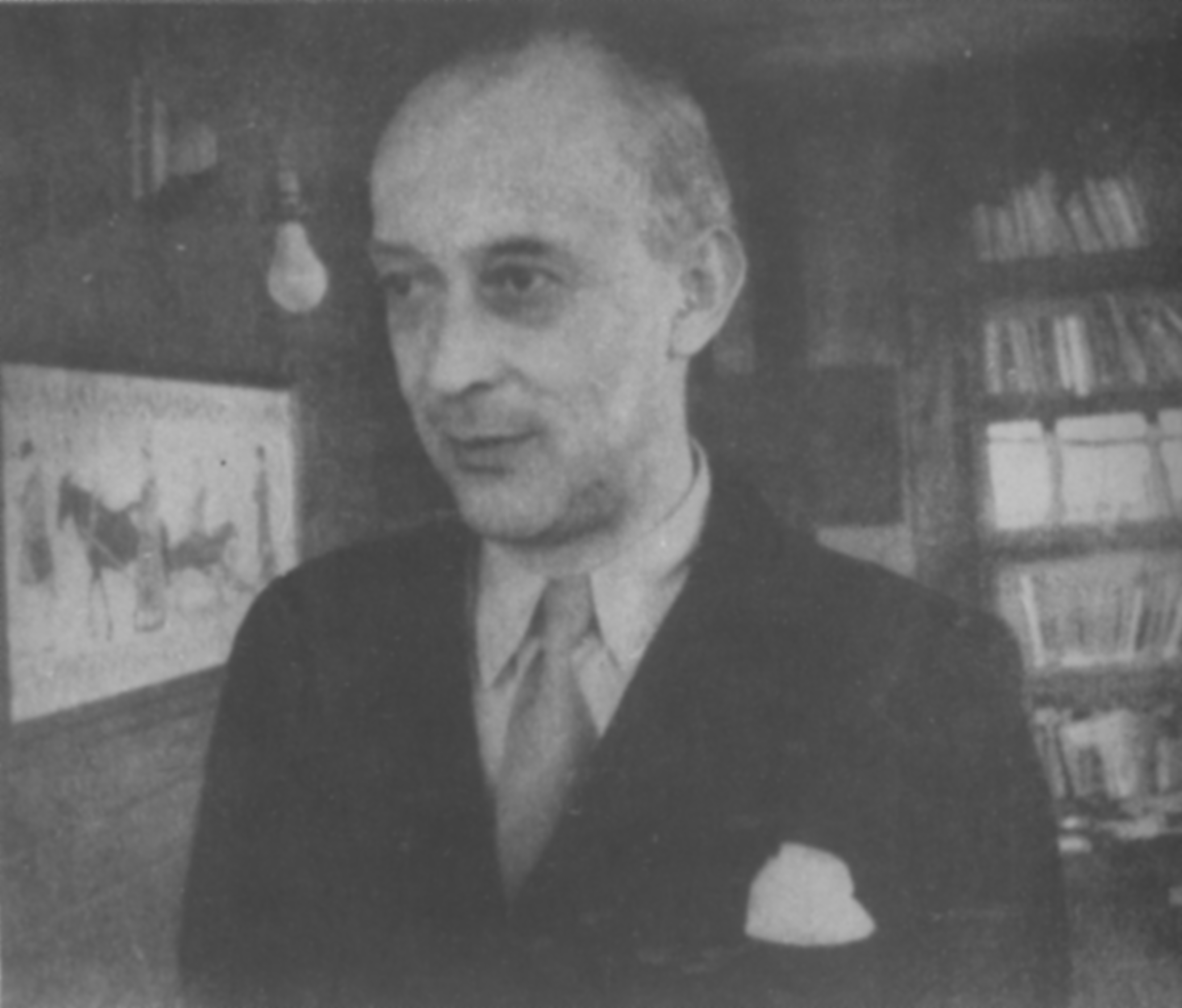
Rafał Malczewski in Ottawa. He settled in Canada in 1942

In 1939, after the outbreak of World War II, having already abandoned his wife and children, he escaped over the Slovak border, with his partner Zofia Mikucka, and via Budapest and Venice made his way to Paris. There he fell on the generosity of the Polish embassy to help him out of another financial difficulty. In 1940, they travelled on to Spain and Portugal, where they stayed for four months. At the beginning of 1941 they moved to Brazil. At first they stayed in Rio de Janeiro where he was able to sell some of his paintings which consisted of water colour landscapes of Rio, Curitiba and of Parana.

In 1942, they moved to Curitiba to stay with his cousin, Maria Bochdan-Niedenthal. Shortly after, he succeeded in obtaining Canadian visas for himself and his girlfriend, Zofia, to travel to Ottawa. By December 1942, he held his first Canadian exhibition in the Montreal Museum of Fine Arts. He managed to persuade the Canadian railways to sponsor him and Zofia to travel across Canada and the United States in search of artistic subjects in exchange for publicity scenery. He spent the winter of 1943 in the Rocky Mountains, which led to a series of canvases that kept him supplied for many exhibitions until 1949. A stay in New York in 1950 was fruitful enough for further sales of his work.

Despite developing problems with his sight, like his father before him, the ensuing years saw a great flowering of his painting and writing. After his wife, Bronislawa died in Warsaw in 1953, he finally married Zofia Mikucka. A stroke in 1957 led to a partial paralysis which obliged him to give up painting in oils, but he was able to continue with water colours. He managed to obtain sponsorship from the CIA-controlled Radio Free Europe and from Quebec City. In 1959, the daughter of Zofia Malczewska-Kondracka invited him to visit Poland. Despite great nostalgia for the south of the country, he resolved to remain in Canada, but his journey was described in his memoir, Wspomnieniach z Polski and serialised in the London émigré paper, Wiadomości. From 1961 he was kept by his daughter, Zofia, and three years later, in 1964 his last exhibition took place in Montreal. He died and was buried there in 1965.

== Characteristics of his art ==
Magdalena Małetko has emphasised several pointers to understand Malczewski's art. His successful artist father wished him to have a more reliable career than his own. While at the University of Vienna Malczewski studied Freud and psychoanalysis as part of the philosophy course, but he failed to complete his degree. He never got over the death of his close friend and climbing partner Bronikowski, who died on a climb they did together in 1917. His first marriage was an attempt to get over his grief and was loveless, and more of a duty due to Bronisława's pregnancy. Painting came to him instinctually as he watched his prolific father working in his studio. Malczewski was an artist difficult to categorise, although he developed his own distinctive style. This has been called "hyper realism" (Witkacy) and "naive". His themes were predominantly empty vistas, mountain scenery, snowscapes and glassy lakes. He also did portraits, cartoons and a series of rally cars and industrial scenery in Silesia. The great hiatus of his life was leaving his family and his beloved Zakopane in 1939. Three years later he had settled in Canada having travelled through Southern Europe and Brazil, where his palette responded to the colour and light. His later life was a struggle with increasing blindness and paralysis which allowed him only to use water colour, alongside his writing, which he managed to do until his death.

His work was part of the art competitions at the 1932 Summer Olympics and the 1936 Summer Olympics.

== Selected exhibitions and awards ==
Malczewski's first public show was with Witkacy at Garlinski's Salon in Warsaw in 1924. Solo shows followed in:

- Zakopane (1926)
- Warsaw (1928, 1929, 1935, 1938)
- Kraków (1930, 1932)
- Łódź (1935)
- Katowice (1938)
- Montreal Museum of Arts ( 1942)
- Corcoran Gallery, Washington, D.C. (1944).
- Dominion Gallery (1949) Washington, D.C.

As a member of the Society for the Propagation of Polish Art Abroad, he participated in the following group exhibitions:

- Prague and Helsinki (1929)
- Vienna and Paris (1928)
- Brussels and The Hague (1929)
- Budapest and Copenhagen (1930)
- Venice (13th Biennale) and Los Angeles (1932)
- Moscow, Edinburgh, and San Francisco (1933)
- New York (1933)
- Berlin (1936)
- Pittsburgh (1938)
- Ottawa (1942)
- Detroit (1945)
- Montreal (1954)

Among the many awards he received were:

- President Ignacy Mościcki prize 1930
- Golden laurel of Polska Akademia Literatury 1937
- Gold Medal for his Wiosna w górach ["Spring in the mountains"] at the Paris Exposition Internationale des Arts et Techniques dans la Vie Moderne 1937
- The Visual Arts Prize of Paris-based Polish-language monthly, Kultura 1962.

== Selected written work ==
In his writing Rafał Malczewski evoked the atmosphere of interbellum Zakopane:

- Od cepra do wariata, [From Lowland Dweller to Madman]
- Narkotyk gór. Nowele tatrzańskie, ["Addicted to mountains. Tatran novellas"] (1928)
- Tatry i Podhale ["The Tatras and their Foothills"] (1935)
- Góry wołają ["The Mountains Beckon"] (1939).
- Pępek świata. Wspomnienia z Zakopanego, ["The Navel of the World. Memories of Zakopane"].
