= Aleksander Zalewski =

Polish botanist (1854–1906)

- Born: 3 May 1854; Radziwie, Congress Poland
- Died: 20 October 1906 (aged 52); Lemberg, Austria-Hungary
- Scientific career
- Fields: Botany
- Institutions: Lviv University.

Aleksander Zalewski (3 May 1854 – 20 October 1906) was a Polish botanist, professor of Lviv University.

Zalewski was an author of mycologic and physiographic works, in which he described flora of Poland.
