= Władysław Kotwicz =

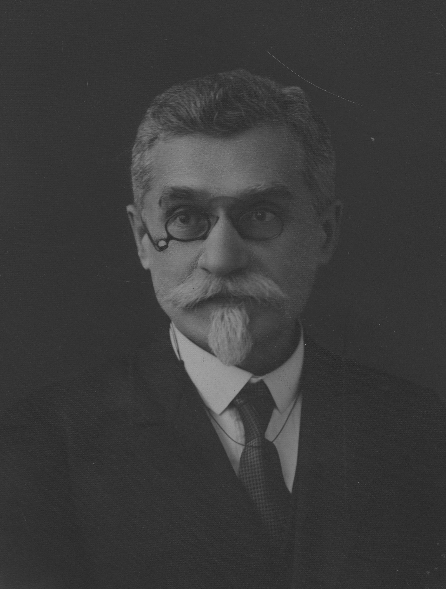
Władysław Kotwicz

Władysław Kotwicz (20 March 1872 – 3 October 1944), also known as Vladislav Lyudvigovich Kotvich (Russian: Владисла́в Лю́двигович Ко́твич) was a Polish-Russian linguist and Orientalist. He mainly studied the Mongolic languages.

== Life and work ==
Kotovich was born on March 20, 1872, in the village of Ossów near Lida. Kotovich began his studies at the Faculty of Oriental Studies at Saint Petersburg University in 1891. He majored in Mongolian but also studied Manchu and Chinese. After graduating in 1895, he worked as a clerk at the Ministry of Finance from 1896.

In 1900, after his doctoral dissertation was approved, Kotovich was appointed Privatdozent and Head of the Department of Mongolian Language and Literature at Saint Petersburg University. He participated in several scientific expeditions to Kalmykia (1894, 1896, 1910, 1917), but the most important scientific journey was the expedition to Northern Mongolia (1912), where he studied the Old Turkic script and the Erdene Zuu Monastery. After the October Revolution, Kotwicz participated in the establishment of the Central Oriental Languages Institute. The establishment work continued until the autumn of 1920, at which time he was appointed director of the newly established institute and held that position until 1922.

In 1922, Kotwich received simultaneous offers for professorships from Jagiellonian University in Krakow and Jan Kazimierz University in Lviv. He chose Lviv, and after acquiring Polish citizenship in 1923, he moved there in 1924 and became the head of the newly established Department of Far Eastern Languages and Literature. The newly established Polish Orientalist Society elected him as its president. In 1927, he became the editor-in-chief of the Polish Journal of Orientalism.

He died on October 3, 1944, in Tsarni Bor near Vilnius. He was buried next to his wife in the Rasos Cemetery in Vilnius.

== Awards ==
- Order of Polonia Restituta Commander's Cross (1936)
- Medal for Long Service (bronze, 1938)
- Order of Saint Stanislaus 2nd class (1904)
- Order of Saint Anna 3rd class (1901)
- Order of Saint Vladimir 4th class
- Romanov Dynasty 300th Anniversary Commemorative Medal (1913)
