= Beaman =

Beaman may refer to:

- Beaman, Iowa, U.S.A.
- Beaman, Missouri, U.S.A.
  - Beaman (cryptid)
- Beaman (surname), English surname
