= Hester C. Jeffrey =

African-American activist (c. 1842–1934)

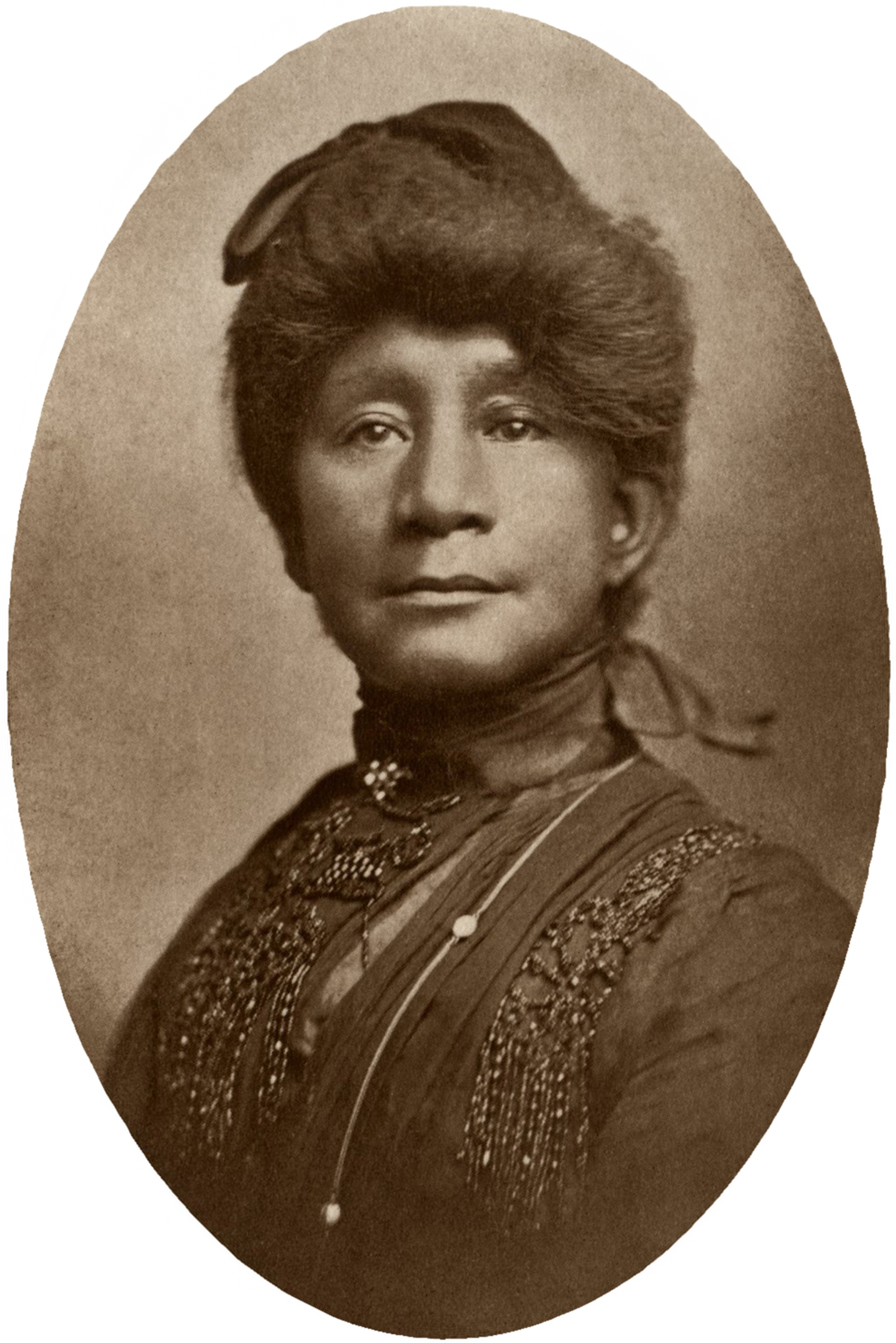
- Born: Hester C. Whitehurst c. 1842; Norfolk, Virginia, U.S.
- Died: January 2, 1934 (aged 91–92); Boston, Massachusetts, U.S.
- Resting place: Everett, Massachusetts, U.S.
- Occupations: Suffragist, political activist, music teacher
- Spouse: Roswell Jerome Jeffrey (m. 1865; died 1908)

Hester C. Jeffrey (née Whitehurst c. 1842 – January 2, 1934), also known as Jeffreys or Jeffries, or Mrs. R. Jerome Jeffrey, after her husband was an American activist, suffragist, and community organizer in Rochester, New York and New York City. She is known for her involvement with the Political Equality Club, the Women's Christian Temperance Union, and the National Association of Colored Women's Clubs.

== Biography ==
Hester C. Whitehurst Jeffrey was born to free black parents, Robert Edward Whitehurst and Martha F (née Pitts) Whitehurst, circa 1843 in Norfolk, Virginia. She was educated, and an accomplished musician. By 1845, Jeffrey and her mother and her sister, Phoebe Whitehurst, had moved to Boston where their half-brother, Manuel Smith, was born in February 1845. In the 1855 Massachusetts Census and in the 1860 U.S. census, the three children are listed in the household of their maternal uncle, Coffin Pitts. In the 1865 Massachusetts Census (dated May 1), the three siblings were living in their own household; Hester and Phoebe worked as dressmakers.

Hester married Roswell Jerome Jeffrey on July 19, 1865, in Boston. Her husband's maternal grandfather was the Rev. Jehiel Beman and his uncle was the Rev. Amos Beman, both noted abolitionists from Connecticut. Her husband's father, the Reverend Roswell Jeffrey, was a real estate investor and political activist in Rochester.

Hester and Jerome Jeffrey lived in Troy, New York, New York, from 1868 to 1872, where he worked as machinist and waiter, according to the 1870 U.S. Census and city directories. They moved back to Boston and lived at 11 Church Street, where their son Jerome was born on April 19, 1874. City death records show he died five days later and was buried in the Central Burying Ground. Her brother Manuel died at their home in June of that year. In the 1910 U.S. Census, Hester reports that she had had four children but none were living. The children do not appear on census records, so presumably all died young.

Her father-in-law died in 1890 in Rochester, New York, and Jerome inherited 1/6 of his father's considerable estate. Hester and Jerome left Boston for Rochester in 1891. In Rochester, she became involved in the Political Equality Club and the Women's Christian Temperance Union (WCTU), She later became a national organizer for the National Association of Colored Women's Clubs (NACWC). She served at various times as the National Organizer of Colored Women's Clubs, New York State President of the Federation of Colored Women's Clubs, County Superintendent of the WCTU, Secretary of the Third Ward WCTU, and Section President of the Needlework Guild of America.

Jeffrey helped create clubs for African-American women, including the Susan B. Anthony Club for black women. This club worked towards women's suffrage and created a Mothers' Council, to help women with small children. Other clubs she created were the Climbers and the Hester C. Jeffrey Club for young black women. The Hester C. Jeffrey Club helped raise money for young black women to take classes at what later became the Rochester Institute of Technology.

She served on the Douglass Monument Committee, which raised funds and commissioned the first monument to an African-American in 1897, a statue of Frederick Douglass, in his hometown of Rochester, New York. She was chosen to direct the music at its unveiling, as well as at the memorial service prior to it that would have included the unveiling, were the statue not delayed.

Jeffrey was friends with Susan B. Anthony and was often seen at Anthony's home in Rochester. Jeffrey was the only layperson to give a eulogy at Anthony's funeral service held in 1906. She had also been selected to represent on "behalf of the negro" at the funeral. The eulogy expressed both sorrow for Anthony's death and also praised her advocacy for women's suffrage. Jeffrey also created the first memorial for Anthony, which was a stained-glass window installed at the AME Zion church in Rochester and unveiled in 1907. Jeffrey's primary religious affiliation was with the AME Zion Church, but she also was a member of the First Unitarian Church of Rochester, the church that Anthony attended.

Her husband died in 1908 in Rochester. By 1915, Jeffrey had moved back to Boston, where she lived with her niece, Georgine (née Glover) Brown, at 418 Newbury St. The women taught music. Hester died on January 2, 1934, in Boston and is buried in an unmarked grave in Woodlawn Cemetery in Everett next to her sister, Phoebe Whitehurst Glover. The family plot also has their brother Manuel, and Phoebe's three children and son-in-law.
