= Beaman (surname) =

Beaman is a surname thought to be either:

- A surname of Norman origin from the English midlands. The name is an Anglicisation of the French Beaumont. It is claimed that English bearers of the name descended from Henry de Beaumont (1280–1340).
- A surname derived from 'ab Edmond' in the mid Anglo-Welsh border regions when surnames became more widely adopted prior to the 1500s. Historic evidence for this is provided by "Welsh Border Surnames from Ab Edmond."

== List of persons with the surname Beaman ==
- Fernando C. Beaman (1814–1882), American politician
- Gerald R. Beaman (born 1952), United States Navy commander
- Gamaliel Waldo Beaman (1852–1937), American painter
- John Beaman (born 1951), British politician
- Lori G. Beaman (born 1963), Canadian scholar of religion and law
- Nathaniel Beaman, co-founder and president of the National Bank of Commerce of Norfolk, Virginia
- Walter B. Jones Jr. (1943–2019), American politician

== List of persons with the surname Beman ==
- Amos Beman (1812–1874), American preacher and abolitionist
- Deane Beman (born 1938), American golfer and golf administrator.
- Jehiel Beman (1791–1858), African-American minister and abolitionist
- Nathan Sidney Smith Beman (1785–1871), president of Rensselaer Polytechnic Institute
- Samuel S. Beman (1822–1882), American lawyer and politician
- Solon Spencer Beman (1853–1914), American architect

== List of persons with the surname Beeman ==
- Edward E. Beeman, inventor of Medicinal Chewing Gum
- Ellen Beeman, American fantasy and science fiction author
- Greg Beeman, American director and producer
- Jen Beeman, American fashion designer and patternmaker
- Joseph H. Beeman (1833–1909), U.S. Representative from Mississippi
- Vanessa Beeman, Grand Bard of the Gorseth Kernow
- William O. Beeman, American anthropologist

== See also ==
- Beamon (disambiguation)
