= Coronation of George V and Mary =

1911 coronation in the United Kingdom

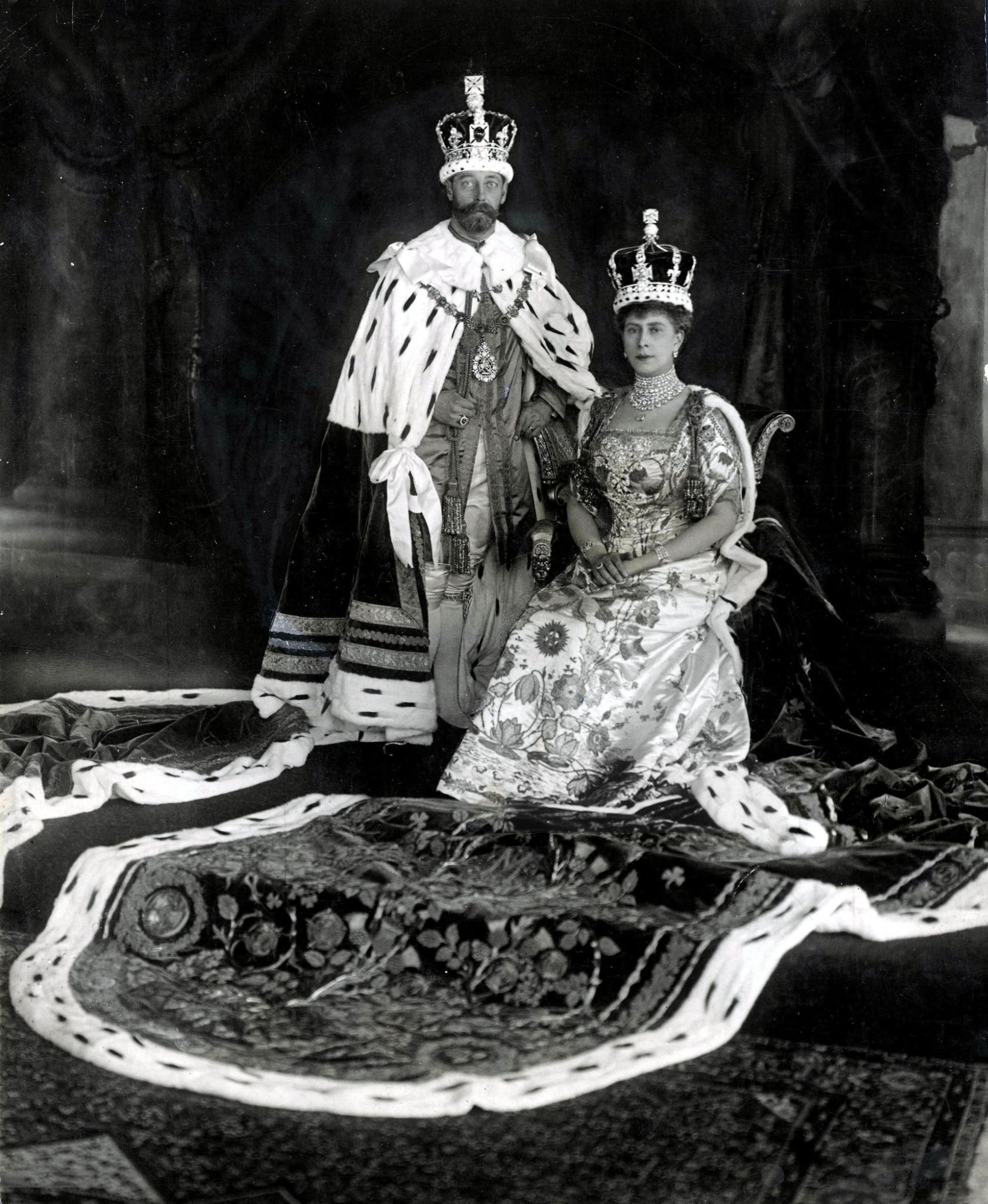
- The King and Queen in their coronation robes, official coronation photograph by Emery Walker
- Date: 22 June 1911; 115 years ago
- Location: Westminster Abbey, London, England
- Participants: King George V; Queen Mary; Great Officers of State; Archbishops and Bishops Assistant of the Church of England; Garter Principal King of Arms; Peers of the Realm; Mistress of the Robes

The coronation of George V and his wife, Mary, as king and queen of the United Kingdom and the British Dominions took place at Westminster Abbey, London, on Thursday 22 June 1911. This was the second of four such events held during the 20th century and the last to be attended by royal representatives of the great continental European empires.

== Preparations ==
=== Planning ===
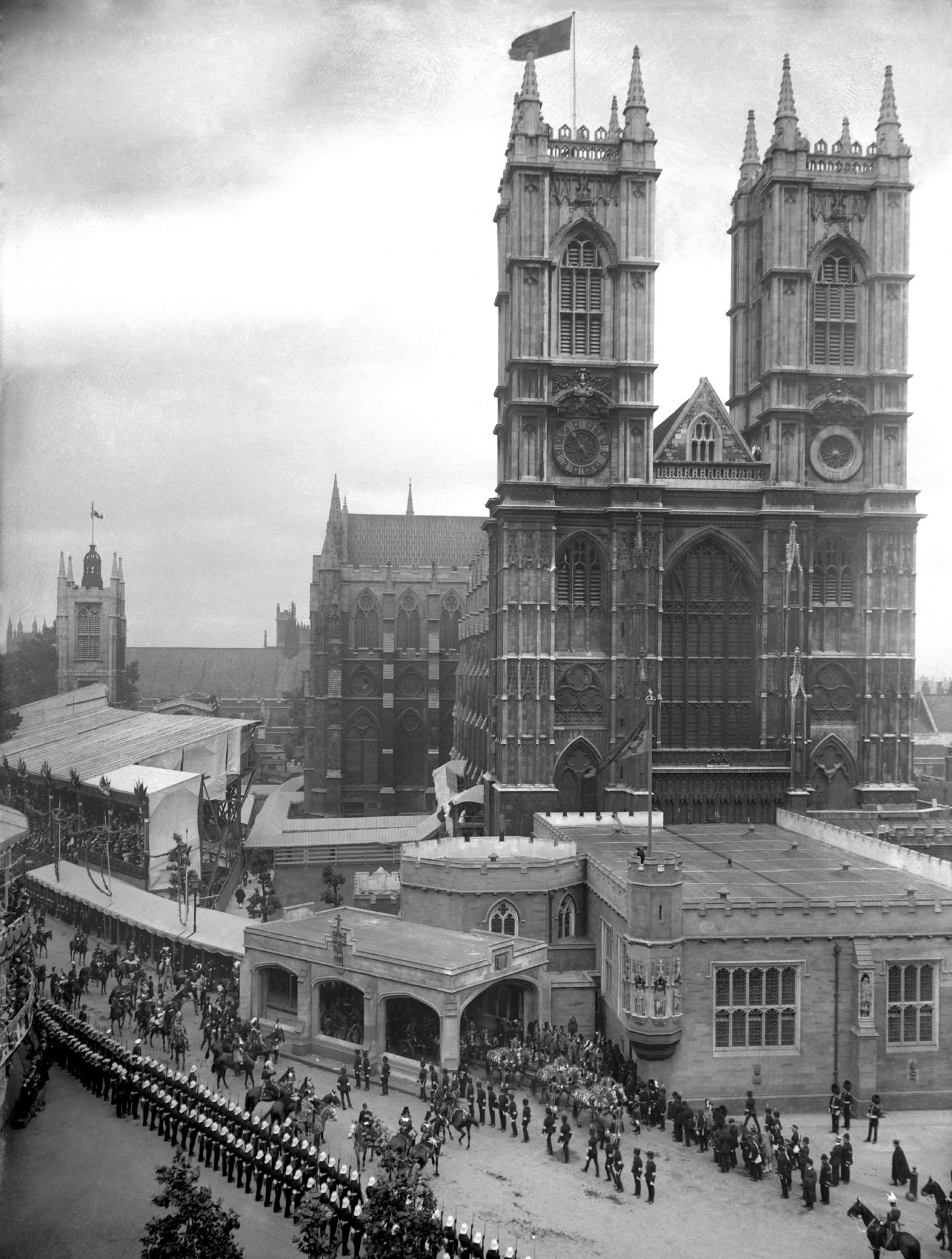
The west front of Westminster Abbey in 1911, showing the temporary Coronation annexe in the Gothic style.

The overall planning of the coronation was theoretically the role of the earl marshal, a hereditary office held by the dukes of Norfolk for several centuries. At the coronation of King Edward VII and Queen Alexandra in 1902, the driving force had been Viscount Esher in his capacity as Secretary to the Office of Works, a position which had since been filled by Sir Schomberg Kerr McDonnell. However, in the interim, the earl marshal, Henry Fitzalan-Howard, 15th Duke of Norfolk, had reasserted his ancient right to organise the great state events, despite having a personal dislike of the ceremonial and having little capability as an organiser. He had no permanent staff and was obliged to appoint a new one for each event. This arrangement had proved highly unsatisfactory for Edward VII's state funeral, when the ceremonial directions were found to be full of errors and had to be rewritten by courtiers on the previous evening, the printed order of service was wrong, and the seating of guests was alleged to be "a mosaic of indecision and confusion". King George described Norfolk as "a charming, honourable, straightforward little gentleman, the finest in the world. But as a man of business he is absolutely impossible."

Despite the objections of the College of Heralds and the Duke of Norfolk, a compromise was reached at the insistence of the prime minister, H. H. Asquith, whereby Norfolk would be chairman of the Coronation Executive Committee, but the detailed work would be done by the professional staff of the Office of Works rather than by Norfolk's appointees.

=== Infrastructure ===
As with all the 20th-century British coronations, a temporary extension or annexe was built at the west front of Westminster Abbey to allow the forming up of the processions before their entry into the church. As in the 1902 coronation, it was designed by the architect Alfred Young Nutt in the Gothic Revival style, matching the architecture of the abbey. Inside the abbey, the traditional ceremonial areas known as the theatre and the sacrarium had to be constructed, along with the galleries and boxes to accommodate the congregation. Following the arrangements for 1902, it was decided to limit the congregation to 6,000, far fewer than at earlier coronations. More than 50 grandstands were erected along the route of the processions, varying in size from seating 250 to 3,500 spectators each. The construction of these required 2,100 Imperial tons (2,134 tonnes) of timber and 70 tons (71 tonnes) of bolts, nails and screws.

=== Festival of Empire ===
The Festival of Empire opened on 12 May 1911 at the Crystal Palace in London, an exhibition of British and Imperial trade and culture to celebrate the upcoming coronation.

=== Attire ===
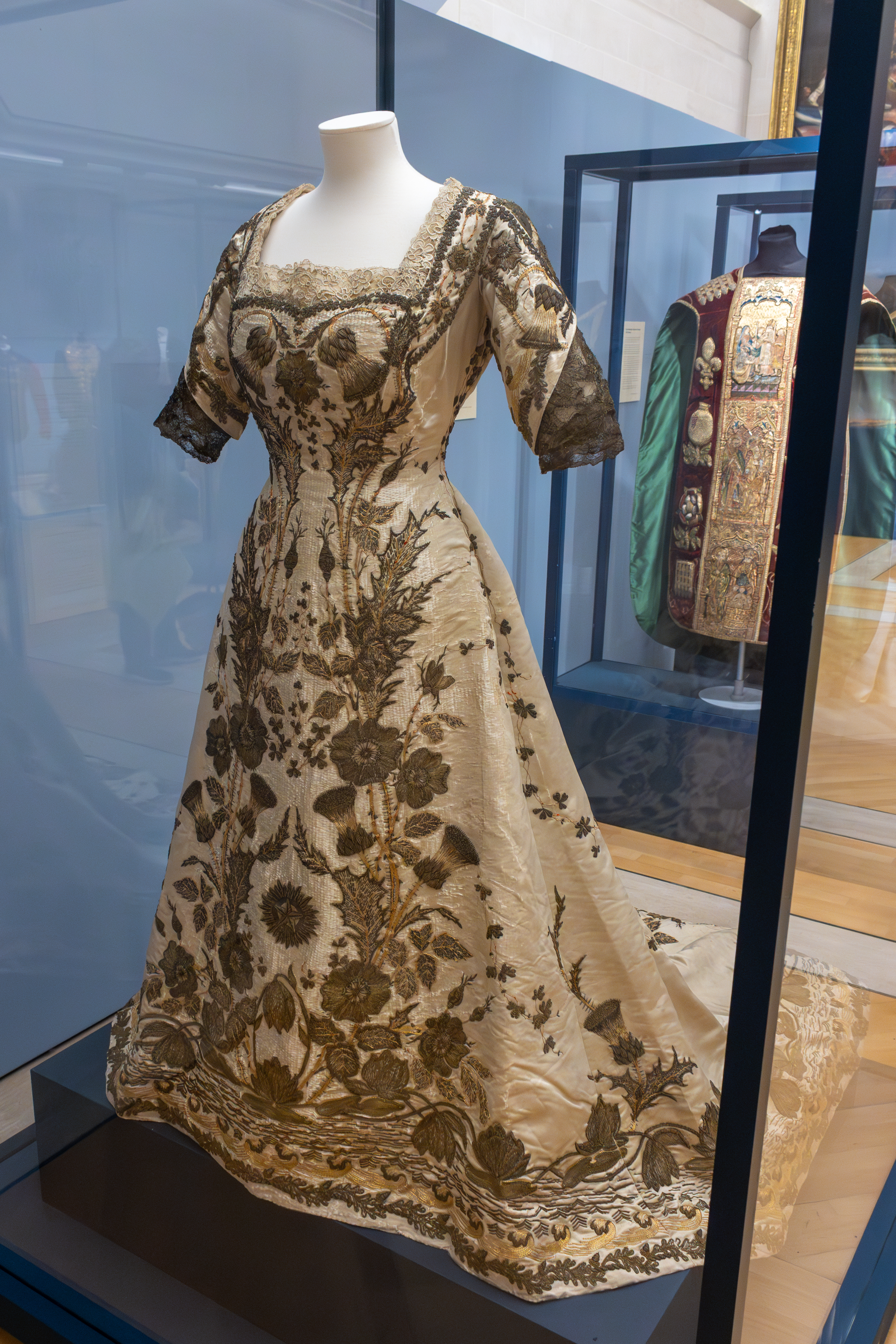
Queen Mary's coronation gown

Queen Mary's coronation gown was made of cream coloured silk satin and incorporated the floral emblems and symbols of Great Britain and the British Empire, namely the Tudor rose, the Scottish thistle, the Irish shamrock, the lotus flower of India, the Star of India, and English oak leaves and acorns, all of which were embroidered by the Princess Louise Needlework School using gold thread. A border of waves at the hem represented the oceans connecting the Empire. Cream silk taffeta was used to make the inner bodice, which was trimmed at neck with handmade Irish needlepoint lace. Reville and Rossiter, a London couture house, designed the gown, while Jessie Charlotte Robinson traced the pattern and embroidery on both the gown and robe.

== The service ==
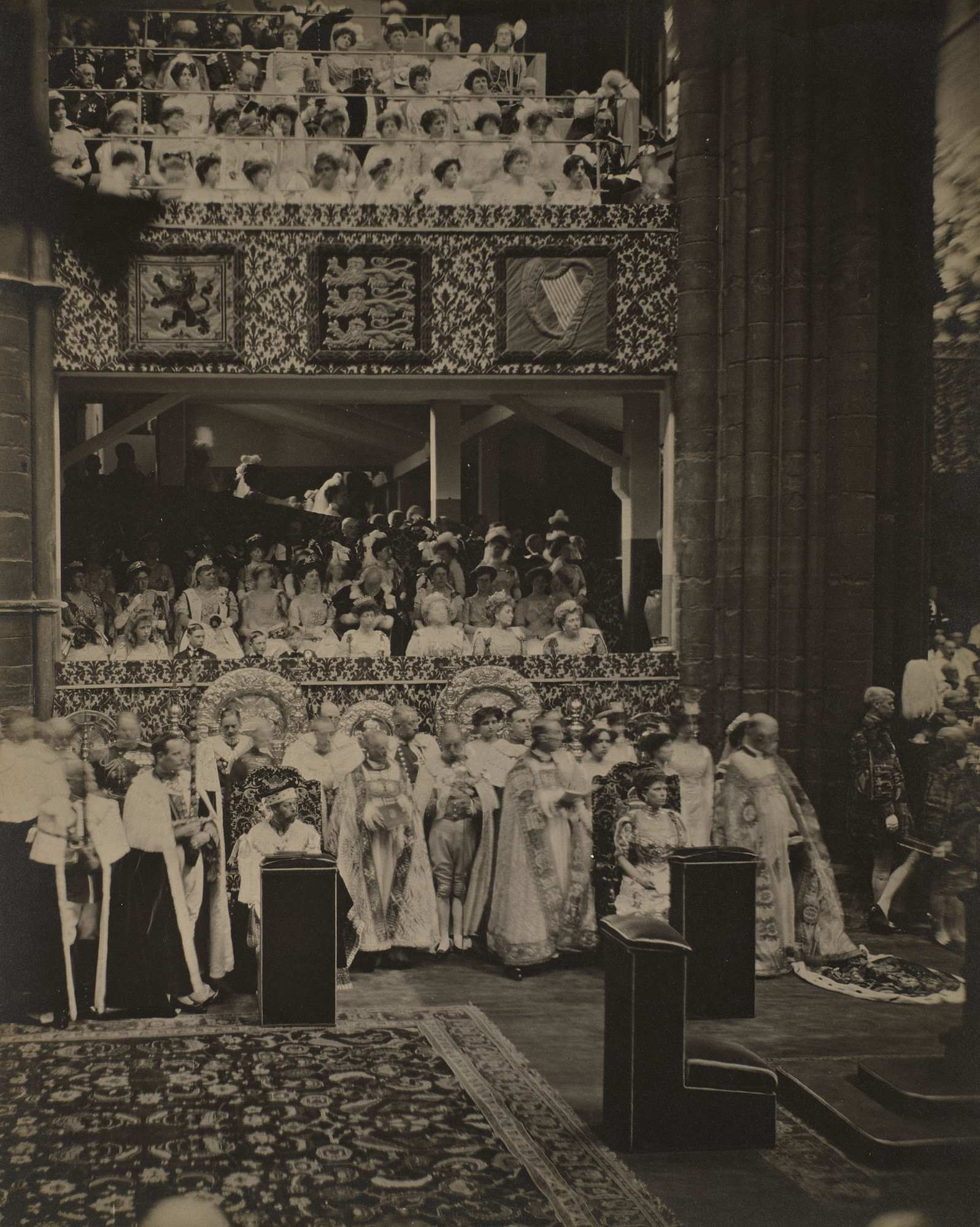
"King George V and Queen Mary occupying their chairs of estate on the south side of the altar during that part of the coronation service which precedes the anointing". An official photograph by Sir John Benjamin Stone (1838–1914).

The order of service was prepared by Claude Jenkins, the Lambeth Palace librarian, an eccentric character who was an antiquarian and patristic scholar. He was supervised by Armitage Robinson, the dean of Westminster, who insisted that innovation be balanced by tradition. In fact, there was little change from the 1902 coronation, or at least that which had been intended, since the service had been shortened because of Edward's poor health. Randall Davidson, who as the bishop of Winchester, had largely compiled the 1902 coronation service, was now archbishop of Canterbury. Davidson sought the advice of Frank Edward Brightman, a liturgist from Magdalen College, Oxford. The main changes were to the words spoken at the actual crowning, which replaced those first used at the coronation of James II and VII and Mary with a translation of the simpler medieval form, and the coronation sermon, which had been omitted in 1902, was reintroduced but in a shorter form. The service was conducted by Davidson, including the crowning of the queen, which in 1902 had been delegated to the archbishop of York. Mary was crowned with a new crown containing the Koh-i-Noor diamond.

=== Music ===
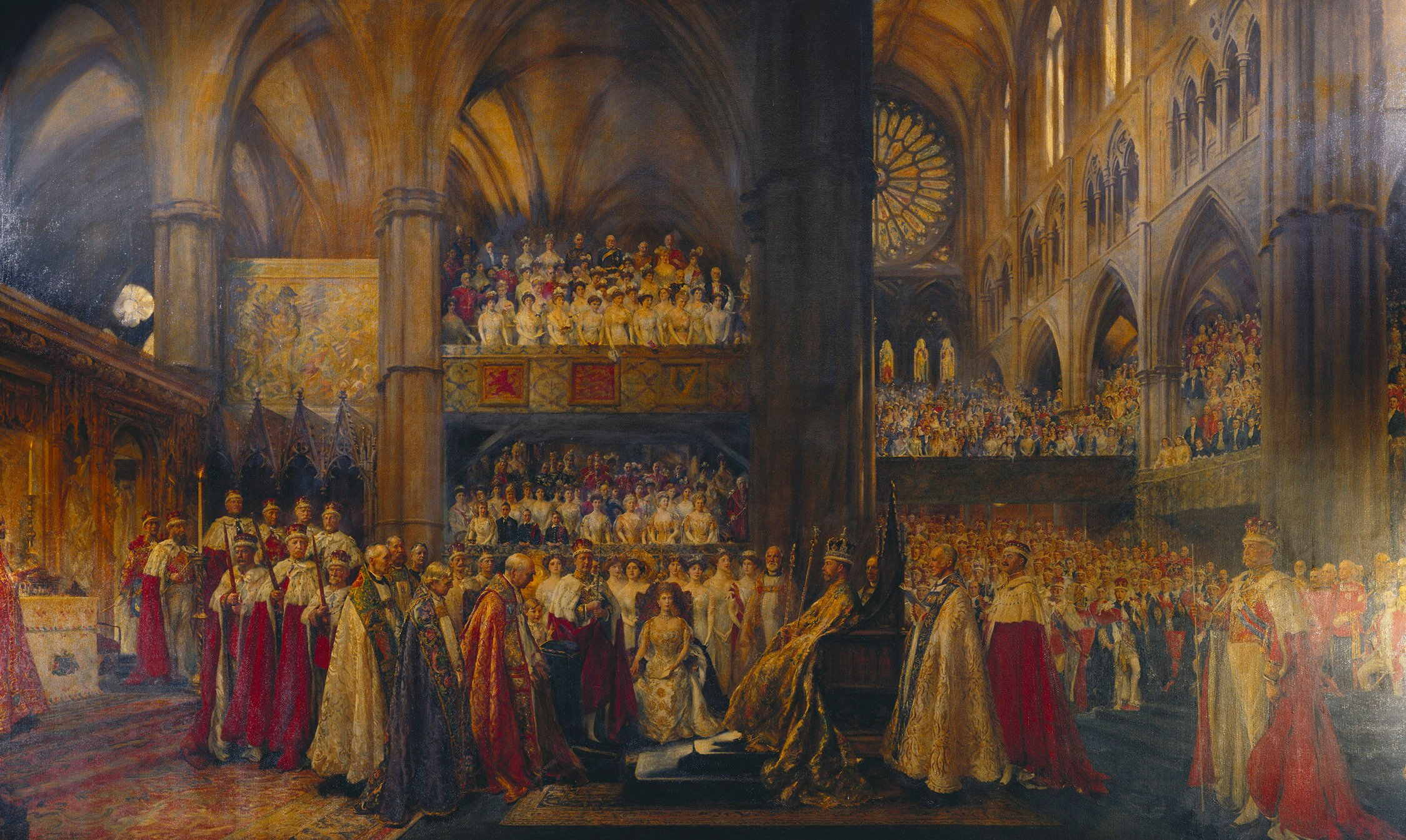
1913 painting by John Henry Frederick Bacon, depicting the coronation service.

The director of music, as in 1902, was Sir Frederick Bridge. As at the previous event, Bridge aimed to produce a celebration of four hundred years of English music, including work by Thomas Tallis, John Merbecke and George Frederick Handel. Bridge himself wrote a new anthem, Rejoice in the Lord, O ye righteous, the tenor solo for which was performed by Edward Lloyd. The organist was Walter Alcock, who also wrote a new setting for the Sanctus. Sir Hubert Parry wrote an orchestral introduction for his setting of Psalm 122, I was glad which had made a great impact at the 1902 coronation, and also a new setting of the Te Deum, which was less well received, perhaps because the choir was exhausted at the end of the three-hour service. More successful was a new setting of the Gloria by Charles Villiers Stanford which was also used at the coronations of 1937 and 1953. New orchestral music included a Coronation March by Edward Elgar, who despite being awarded the Order of Merit in the coronation honours list, inexplicably refused to attend in person.

== The Processions-in-State ==
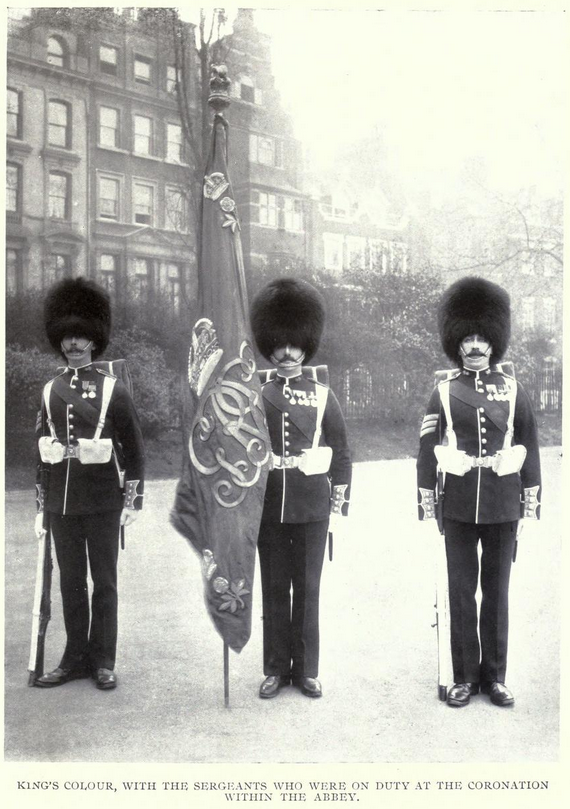
A colour party of the Grenadier Guards with the King's Colour, following the coronation procession.

=== The processions to the Abbey ===
The first of three processions left Buckingham Palace at 9:30 am. It consisted of representatives of foreign royal families and governments, carried in fourteen carriages. The second procession had five state landaus for members of the British royal family; the fifth contained the King and Queen's children, the Prince of Wales, Princess Mary and the young Princes Albert, Henry and George. The third procession brought the officers of state in a further four carriages and the twenty-fifth and final carriage, the Gold State Coach carrying the King and Queen. They were surrounded by equerries, aides-de-camp and the commanders of the armed forces mounted on horseback, all escorted by Yeomen of the Guard, colonial and Indian cavalry and the Royal Horse Guards.

=== The return processions ===
Following the coronation service, the three processions returned to the palace in reverse order and by an extended route, passing through Pall Mall, St James's Street, Piccadilly and Constitution Hill. Some 45,000 soldiers and sailors from across the empire either participated in the procession or lined the route.

After the end of the procession, the King and Queen appeared on the balcony of Buckingham Palace. This created such excitement that the soldiers outside the palace broke ranks and joined in the cheering. According to one account, "some of them put their helmets on their rifles and waved them vigorously aloft". Mary wrote of the day in her diaries: "The ceremony was beautiful & most impressive... Magnificent reception both going & coming back". That evening, the principal buildings in central London were illuminated with strings of electric lights until 12:30 am.

=== The royal progress through the City ===
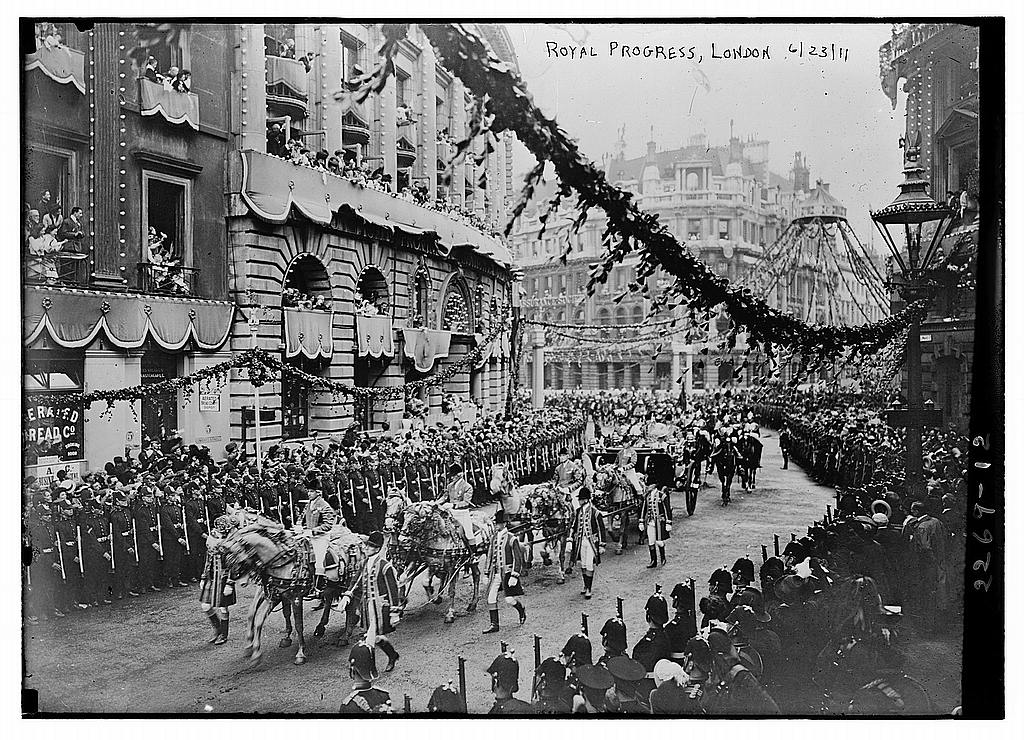
The royal progress in the City of London on 23 June.

On the following day, the return procession was reconstituted for a further parade through the streets of the capital, this time passing along The Strand and into the City of London, past St Paul's Cathedral, across the River Thames by London Bridge, along Borough High Street, back over Westminster Bridge and finally returning up The Mall to Buckingham Palace. Instead of the Gold State Coach, the King and Queen were driven in an open landau. The place of the foreign royalty was taken by Indian princes and colonial rulers. This time, 55,000 troops were on duty.

== The King's account ==
The following extracts are from George's account of the events, which he wrote in his diaries.

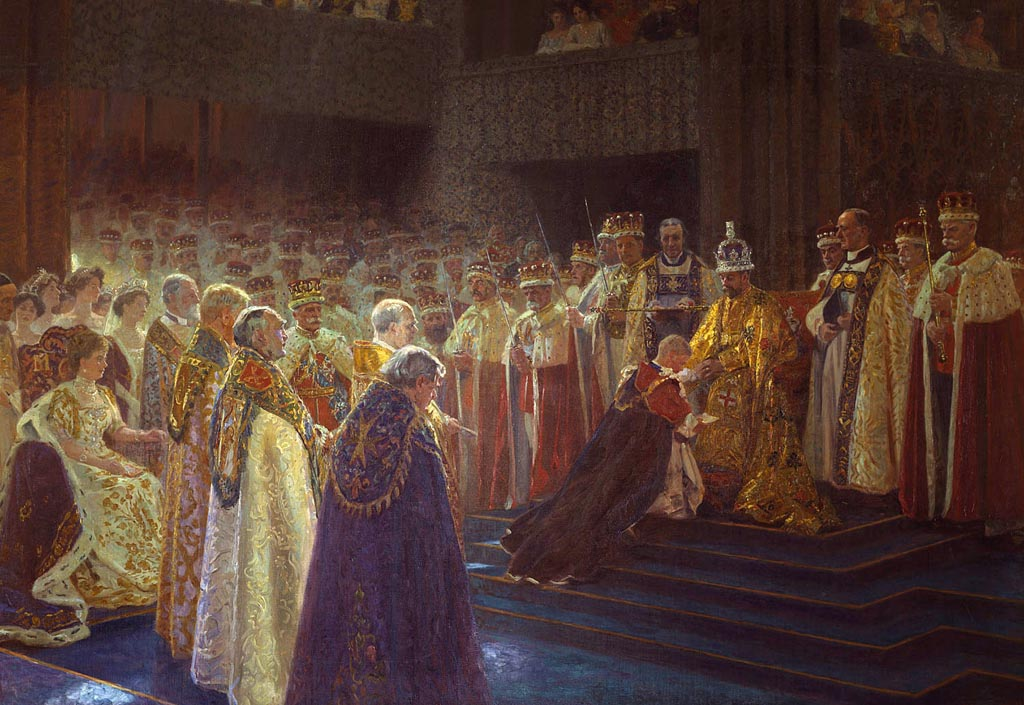
Edward, Prince of Wales pays homage to his father King George V; painting by Laurits Tuxen

It was overcast & cloudy with slight showers & a strongish cool breeze, but better for the people than great heat. Today was indeed a great & memorable day in our lives & one which we can never forget, but it brought back to me many sad memories of 9 years ago when the beloved Parents were crowned. May & I left B.P. in the Coronation coach at 10.30. with 8 cream coloured horses. There were over 50,000 troops lining the streets under the command of Ld. Kitchener. There were hundreds of thousands of people who gave us a magnificent reception. The Service in the Abbey was most beautiful & impressive, but it was a terrible ordeal. It was grand, yet simple & most dignified & went without a hitch. I nearly broke down when dear David came to do homage to me, as it reminded me so much when I did the same thing to beloved Papa, he did it so well. Darling May looked lovely & it was indeed a comfort to me to have her by my side, as she has been ever to me during these last 18 years. We left Westminster Abbey at 2.15. (having arrived there before 11.0) with our Crowns on & sceptres in our hands. This time we drove by the Mall, St James' Street & Piccadilly, crowds enormous & decorations very pretty. On reaching B.P. just before 3.0. May & I went out on the balcony to show ourselves to the people. Downey photographed us in our robes with Crowns on. Had some lunch with our guests here. Worked all the afternoon with Bigge & others answering telegrams & letters of which I have hundreds. Such a large crowd collected in front of the Palace that I went out on balcony again. Our guests dined with us at 8.30. May & I showed ourselves again to the people. Wrote & read. Rather tired. Bed at 11.45. Beautiful illuminations everywhere.

== The Coronation Review of the Fleet ==
A painting by A. B. Cull depicting the arrival of the fleet at Spithead for the Review of the Fleet. In the centre is HMS Neptune (1909), the flagship of Sir Francis Bridgeman, Commander-in-Chief Home Fleet. On the left are the Russian cruiser Rossia and the German battlecruiser SMS Von der Tann.

On 24 June, the King and Queen attended the Coronation Review of the Fleet at Spithead between the naval base of Portsmouth and the Isle of Wight. The Royal Navy had 167 warships in attendance, together with 18 ships from foreign navies; they were arranged in five lines, each 6 miles (10 kilometres) in length, through which the royal party steamed in review, aboard the royal yacht, HMY Victoria and Albert. The crowd of spectators ashore was estimated to number a quarter of a million.

On 29 June, the King and Queen attended a thanksgiving service at St Paul's Cathedral.

== The Delhi Durbar ==
On 11 November 1911, the King and Queen left Portsmouth aboard RMS Medina bound for the Indian Empire. Arriving in Bombay (present day Mumbai) on 2 December, they reached Delhi by train on 7 December for a ceremonial state entry. The durbar itself was on 12 December, attended by an estimated 100,000 people, both watching and participating.

== Guests ==
=== British royal family ===
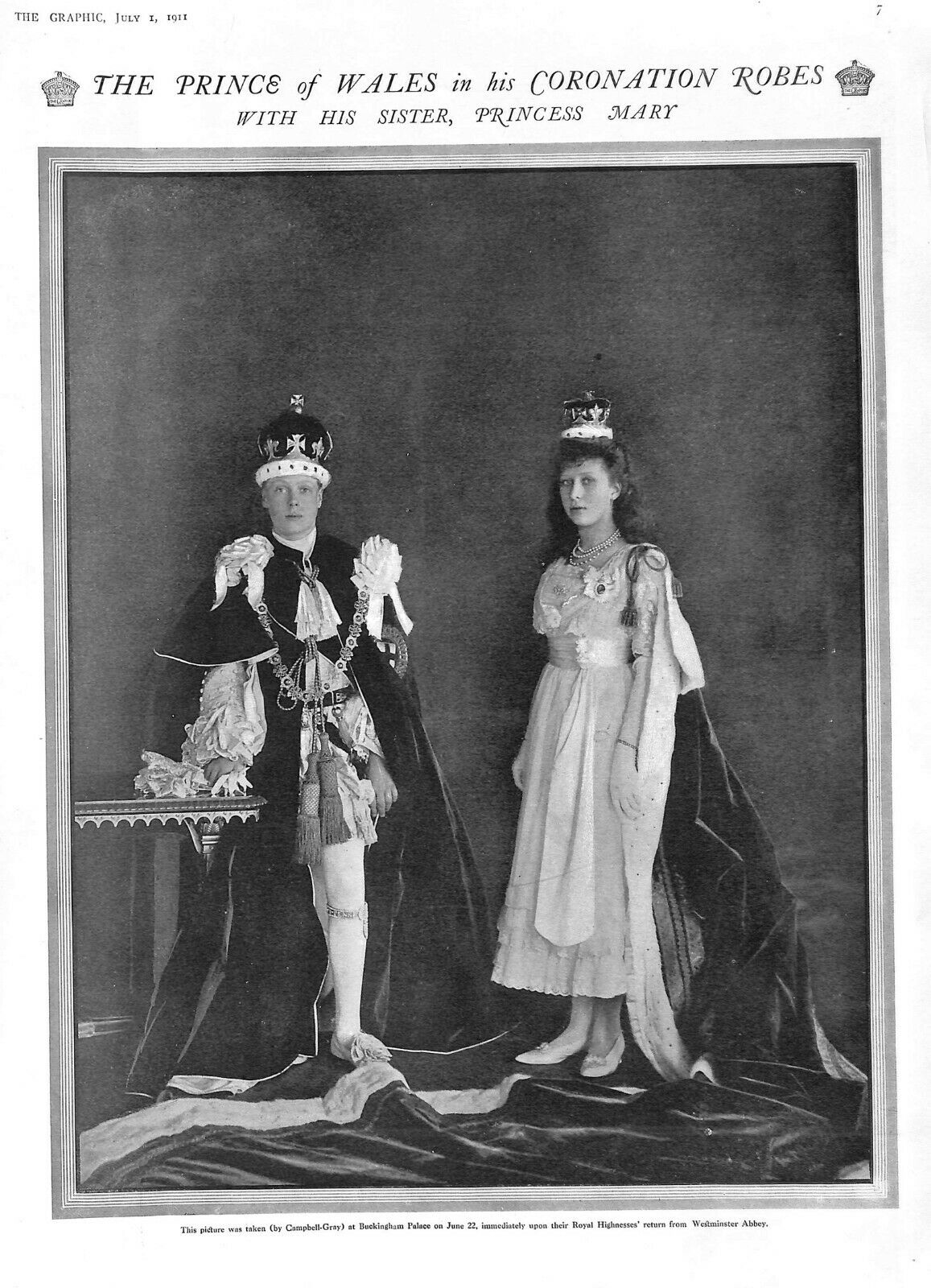
The Prince of Wales in his coronation robes, with his sister, Princess Mary, photographed at Buckingham Palace immediately after their return from the coronation by the Campbell-Gray studio

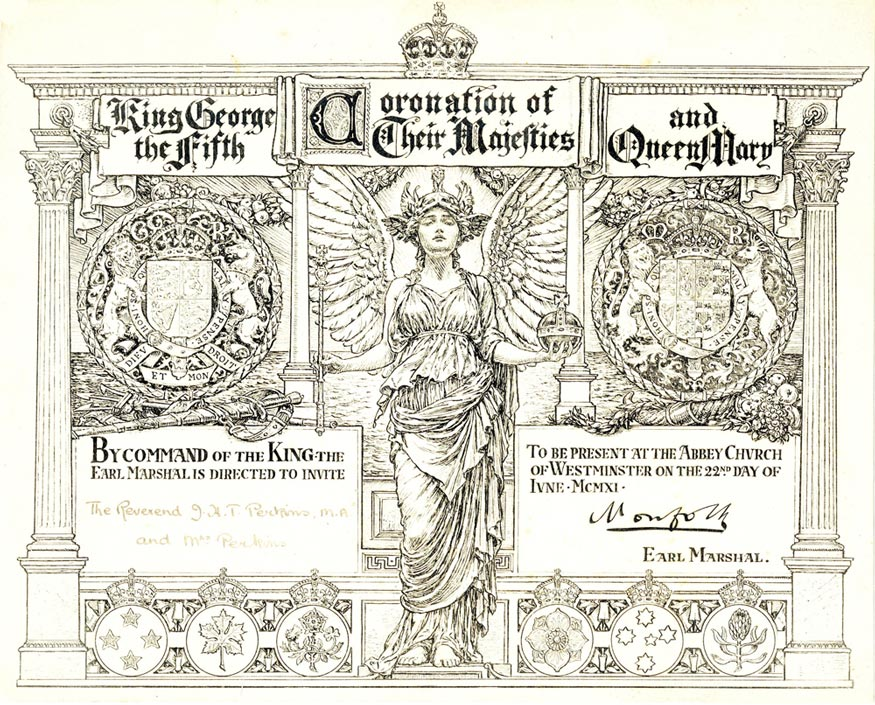
King George V and Queen Mary coronation invitation

- The Prince of Wales, the King and Queen's son
- The Prince Albert, the King and Queen's son
- The Princess Mary, the King and Queen's daughter
- The Prince Henry, the King and Queen's son
- The Prince George, the King and Queen's son
- The Princess Royal and the Duke of Fife, the King's sister and brother-in-law
  - Princess Alexandra, the King's niece
  - Princess Maud, the King's niece
- The Dowager Duchess of Saxe-Coburg and Gotha (Duchess of Edinburgh), the King's paternal aunt by marriage
  - (Kingdom of Romania) The Crown Princess and Crown Prince of Romania, the King's first cousin and the King's third cousin (representing his uncle, the King of the Romanians)
- Princess and Prince Christian of Schleswig-Holstein, the King's paternal aunt and uncle
  - Prince Albert of Schleswig-Holstein, the King's first cousin
  - Princess Helena Victoria of Schleswig-Holstein, the King's first cousin
  - Princess Marie Louise of Schleswig-Holstein, the King's first cousin
- The Princess Louise, Duchess of Argyll and the Duke of Argyll, the King's paternal aunt and uncle
- The Duke and Duchess of Connaught and Strathearn, the King's paternal uncle and aunt
  - The Crown Princess and Crown Prince of Sweden, the King's first cousin and the Queen's third cousin (representing his father, the King of Sweden)
  - Prince Arthur of Connaught, the King's first cousin
  - Princess Patricia of Connaught, the King's first cousin
- The Dowager Duchess of Albany, the King's paternal aunt by marriage
  - Princess and Prince Alexander of Teck, the King's first cousin and the Queen's brother
  - The Duke and Duchess of Saxe-Coburg and Gotha (Duke and Duchess of Albany), the King's first cousin and the King's second cousin
- Princess Henry of Battenberg, the King's paternal aunt
  - Prince Alexander of Battenberg, the King's first cousin
  - Prince Leopold of Battenberg, the King's first cousin
  - Prince Maurice of Battenberg, the King's first cousin
- Princess and Prince Louis of Battenberg, the King's first cousin and her husband
  - Princess Louise of Battenberg, the King's first cousin once removed
  - Prince George of Battenberg, the King's first cousin once removed
- The Duke and Duchess of Teck, the Queen's brother and sister-in-law
  - Prince George of Teck, the Queen's nephew
  - Princess Mary of Teck, the Queen's niece
  - Princess Helena of Teck, the Queen's niece
- Princess Victor of Hohenlohe-Langenburg, widow of the King's half-first cousin once removed
  - Countess Feodora Gleichen, the King's half-second cousin
  - Count Edward Gleichen, the King's half-second cousin
  - Countess Valda Machel, the King's half-second cousin
  - Countess Helena Gleichen, the King's half-second cousin
- The Earl of Munster, the King's third cousin
- Lt. Col. Charles FitzClarence, the King's third cousin

=== Foreign royals ===
- (German Empire) The German Crown Prince and Crown Princess, the King's first cousin once removed and his wife (representing his father, the German Emperor)
- The Hereditary Princess of Saxe-Meiningen, the King's first cousin (representing her father-in-law, the Duke of Saxe-Meiningen)
- (Kingdom of Prussia) Prince Henry of Prussia, the King's first cousin
- The Hereditary Princess and Hereditary Prince of Hesse, the King's first cousin and the King's first cousin once removed
- (Grand Duchy of Hesse) The Grand Duke and Grand Duchess of Hesse and by Rhine, the King's first cousin and his wife
- The Crown Prince of Denmark, the King's first cousin (representing his father, the King of Denmark)
- (Kingdom of Greece) The Duke and Duchess of Sparta, the King's first cousins, (representing his father, the King of the Hellenes)
  - (Kingdom of Greece) Prince George of Greece and Denmark, the King's double first cousin once removed
- (Kingdom of Greece) Prince and Princess George of Greece and Denmark, the King's first cousin and his wife
- (Grand Duchy of Baden) Princess and Prince Maximilian of Baden, the King's first cousin and her husband (representing his first cousin, the Grand Duke of Baden)
- The Hereditary Prince of Hanover, the King's first cousin
- (Grand Duchy of Mecklenburg-Schwerin) The Grand Duchess and Grand Duke of Mecklenburg-Schwerin, the King's first cousin and her husband
- Prince Ernest Augustus of Hanover and Cumberland, the King's first cousin
- (Grand Duchy of Mecklenburg-Strelitz) The Grand Duke of Mecklenburg-Strelitz, the Queen's first cousin
  - (Kingdom of Montenegro) The Crown Princess and Crown Prince of Montenegro, the Queen's first cousin once removed and her husband (representing his father, the King of Montenegro)
  - (Grand Duchy of Mecklenburg-Strelitz) The Hereditary Grand Duke of Mecklenburg-Strelitz, the Queen's first cousin once removed
- Prince Philipp of Saxe-Coburg and Gotha, the King's second cousin once removed
  - Prince Leopold Clement of Saxe-Coburg and Gotha, the King's third cousin
- The Duke of Schleswig-Holstein, the King's half-second cousin
- (Tsardom of Bulgaria (1908–1946)) The Prince of Tarnovo, the King's third cousin (representing his father, the Tsar of the Bulgarians)
- (Kingdom of Württemberg) Duke Albrecht of Württemberg, the King and Queen's mutual third cousin (representing his cousin, the King of Württemberg)
- (Kingdom of Saxony) Prince and Princess Johann Georg of Saxony, the King's third cousin and his wife (representing his brother, the King of Saxony)
- The Crown Prince of the Ottoman Empire (representing his first cousin, the Ottoman Sultan)
- (Austria-Hungary) Archduke Karl of Austria (representing his great-uncle, the Emperor of Austria)
- (Kingdom of Italy) The Duke and Duchess of Aosta (representing his first cousin, the King of Italy)
- (Russian Empire) Grand Duke Boris Vladimirovich of Russia (representing his first cousin, the Tsar of Russia)
- Infante Ferdinand of Spain (representing his brother-in-law, the King of Spain)
- (Empire of Japan) Prince and Princess Higashifushimi of Japan (representing his cousin, the Emperor of Japan)
- (Kingdom of Serbia) The Crown Prince of Serbia (representing his father, the King of Serbia)
- (Thailand) The Prince of Phitsanulok (representing his brother, the King of Siam)
- (Kingdom of Bavaria) Prince Rupprecht of Bavaria (representing his grandfather, the Prince Regent of Bavaria)
- The Prince of the Netherlands (representing his wife the Queen of the Netherlands)
- (Qing dynasty) Prince Zaizhen of China (representing his cousin, the Emperor of China)
- Prince Kassa Haile Darge of Ethiopia (representing his first cousin once removed, the Emperor of Ethiopia)
- (Khedivate of Egypt) Prince Mohammed Ali Tewfik of Egypt (representing his brother, the Khedive of Egypt and Sudan)
- The Hereditary Prince of Monaco (representing his father, the Prince of Monaco)
- Prince Viliami Tungī Mailefihi (representing his cousin, the King of Tonga)
- Madho Rao Scindia, Maharaja of Gwalior
- Pratap Singh, Maharaja of Idar
- Ganga Singh, Maharaja of Bikaner

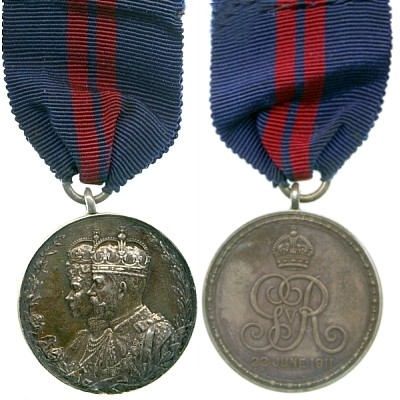
King George V Coronation Medal

=== Other dignitaries ===
- John Hays Hammond (representing the President of the United States)
- Major General Adolphus Greely of the United States Army
- (French Third Republic) Vice-Admiral Fauques de Jonquieres (representing the French Republic)
- (United States) Sarah Josephine Meredith Langstaff (representing the Daughters of the British Empire)
- Monsignor Eugenio Maria Giuseppe Giovanni Pacelli (representing the Holy See)
- Wilfrid Laurier, Prime Minister of Canada

== See also ==
- 1911 Coronation Honours
- Canadian Coronation Contingent
- Coronation of the British monarch
- King George V Coronation Medal
- List of British coronations
- The Marys of the Empire
- Women's Coronation Procession

== Sources ==
=== Books ===
- Beeson, Trevor (2009). In Tuneful Accord: The Church Musicians. SCM Press. ISBN 978-0-334-04193-1.
- Kuhn, William M (1996). Democratic Royalism: The Transformation of the British Monarchy, 1861-1914. Palgrave Macmillan. ISBN 978-0312159559.
- Matthew, H. C. G. (September 2004; online edition May 2009) George V (1865–1936), Oxford Dictionary of National Biography, Oxford University Press, doi:10.1093/ref:odnb/33369, retrieved 1 May 2010 (Subscription required)
- Milne, J Hogarth (1914). Great Britain in the Coronation Year. London: W H Allen & Company Ltd.
- Moore, Jerrold Northrop (1999). Edward Elgar: A Creative Life. Clarendon Press. ISBN 978-0198163664.
- Range, Matthias (2012). Music and Ceremonial at British Coronations: From James I to Elizabeth II. Cambridge University Press. ISBN 978-1-107-02344-4.
- Richards, Jeffrey (2001). Imperialism and Music: Britain, 1876-1953. Manchester University Press. ISBN 0-7190-6143-1.
- Strong, Sir Roy (2005). Coronation: A History of Kingship and the British Monarchy. London: Harper Collins. ISBN 978-0007160549.

=== Articles ===
- "THE CORONATION". The Dominion. Wellington, New Zealand. 21 June 1911. p. 8.
- "The Coronation of King George the Fifth and Queen Mary in Westminster Abbey, June 22, 1911". The Musical Times. 52 (821): 433–437. 1 July 1911. doi:10.2307/907261. JSTOR 907261.
