= Richard W. Hunt =

United States Navy vice admiral (born 1953)

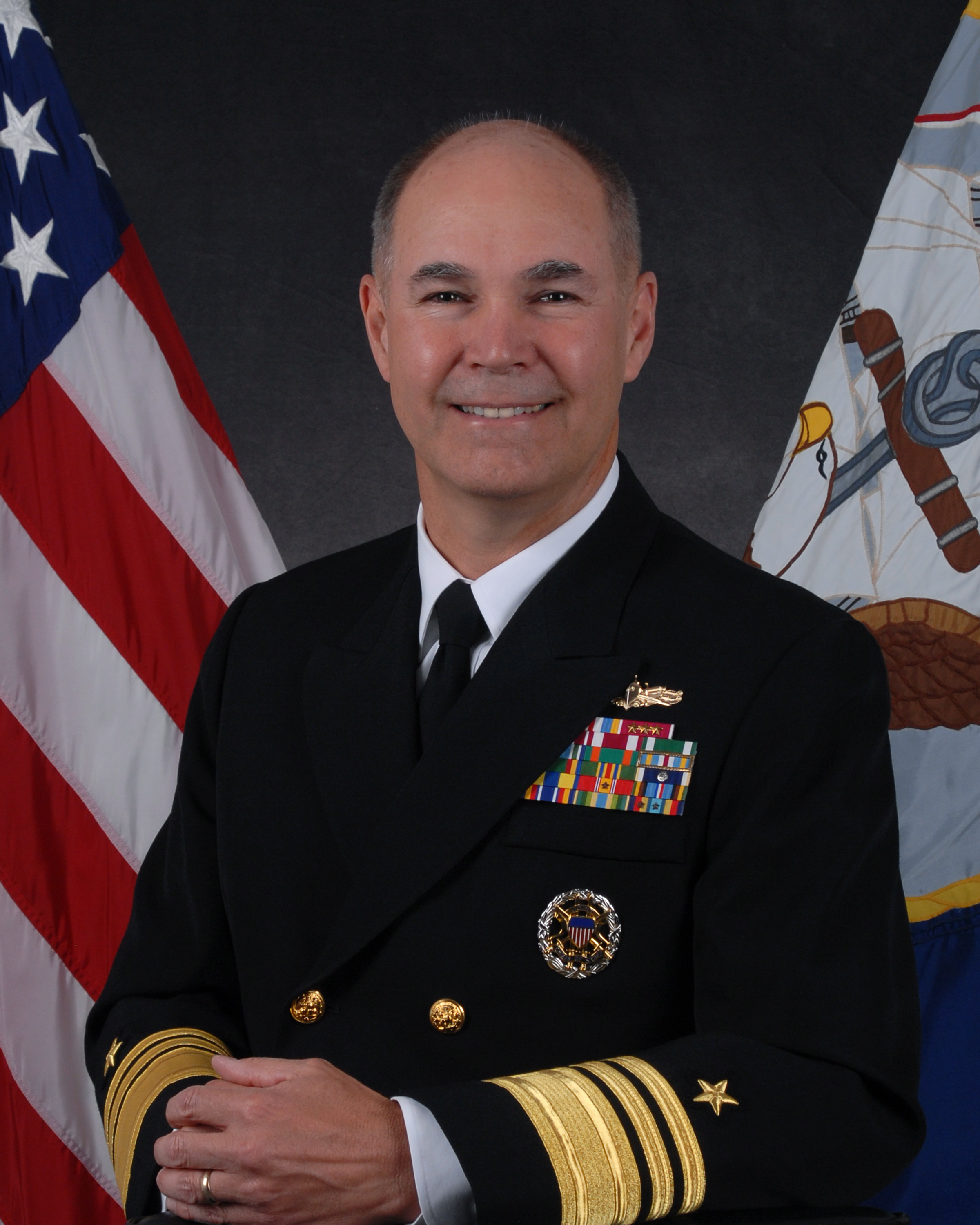
- Born: 1953 (age 72–73)
- Military career
- Allegiance: United States
- Branch: United States Navy
- Service years: 1976–2013
- Rank: Vice Admiral
- Commands: Director, Navy Staff
- Awards: Defense Superior Service Medal; Legion of Merit; Defense Meritorious Service Medal; Meritorious Service Medal; Navy Commendation Medal

Richard Wayne Hunt (born 1953) is a United States Navy vice admiral who served as Director - Navy Staff. He retired from active duty in November 2013.

Hunt graduated from the University of Wisconsin–Madison in 1975 with a Bachelor of Science in Bacteriology. He was commissioned as an ensign in February 1976 through the Officer Candidate School Program in Newport, RI. He attended the Naval Postgraduate School, receiving a Master of Science in Telecommunications Systems Management in March 1988.

Hunt served in USS Sampson (DDG-10), USS Underwood (FFG 36) and USS Roark (FF-1053). As commanding officer of USS Crommelin (FFG 37) from August 1993 to May 1995, deployed as part of the Kitty Hawk Battle Group in support of Korean Contingency Operations. Following his command tour, he served as assistant chief of staff for Operations and Plans for commander, Cruiser-Destroyer Group 2, deploying twice to the Mediterranean Sea/Persian Gulf as part of the George Washington Battle Group. He served as commanding officer, USS Philippine Sea (CG 58) and Air Warfare commander for the Enterprise Battle Group from December 1999 to July 2001. In July 2005 he assumed command of Carrier Strike Group 6. Additionally, he served as commander, Combined Joint Task Force-Horn of Africa, United States Central Command from April 2006 to February 2007. From June 2009 to April 2011 he was the commander, U.S. 3rd Fleet. He became commander, Naval Surface Forces, commander, Naval Surface Force, U.S. Pacific Fleet in June 2011.

Shore assignments include: assistant professor NROTC Unit, Ohio State University; Communications Systems officer for Command, Control, Communications, and Computer Systems Directorate (J6), Joint Staff; executive assistant to director Surface Warfare (N86); executive assistant to deputy chief of staff of Naval Operations for Resources, Requirements and Assessments (N8), and executive assistant to Chairman, Joint Chiefs of Staff. Most recently Hunt served as director, Programming Division (N80) Navy staff.

Personal decorations include the Defense Superior Service Medal, Legion of Merit, Defense Meritorious Service Medal, Meritorious Service Medal, Navy Commendation Medal, Joint Service Achievement Medal, Navy Achievement Medal and various service medals and unit awards.

Military offices
Preceded by Samuel J. Locklear	Commander, United States Third Fleet; 2009–2011	Succeeded by Gerald R. Beaman
