= Hezekiah Hunter =

American teacher, minister and politician (1837–1894)

Hezekiah Hamilton Hunter

Member of the U.S. House of Representatives from South Carolina's Charleston County district
- In office 1870–1872

Personal details
- Born: 1837 Raleigh, NC, USA
- Died: 1894 (aged 56–57)
- Occupation: teacher, minister, politician

Hezekiah Hamilton Hunter (1837 – 1894) was an American teacher, minister and politician. He was an African-American politician during the Reconstruction Era and served in the South Carolina House of Representatives from 1870 to 1872.

== Biography ==
Hunter was born in 1837 in Raleigh, North Carolina, to Isaac H. Hunter, Sr., a shoemaker, and Emily Hunter. He was of mixed African and European ancestry and was born into slavery, his mother and siblings owned by politician and landowner William Boylan. His father, also formerly enslaved in Raleigh, had previously purchased his own freedom with the money he earned from nightwork as a shoemaker, and by 1842 had bought his wife and children out of slavery by raising an even larger sum. The Hunters settled in Brooklyn, New York.

Hezekiah Hunter's siblings included William Hammett Hunter—a Wilberforce University graduate and minister in the AME Church, who became the second African American army chaplain commissioned in the United States (part of the 4th United States Colored Infantry Regiment)—and Isaac H. Hunter, Jr., who became a noted orator and delegate to the 1884 Democratic National Convention, authoring the equal rights plank of the Democratic Party platform adopted at that gathering. In 1864, he married Eliza R. Howell, the stepdaughter of prominent abolitionist Amos Beman.

Hunter was sent to the southern United States as a Presbyterian minister in 1865 by the American Missionary Association to teach at Freedmen's Schools and minister, along with his brother-in-law, politician and educator Francis Lewis Cardozo. He represented Charleston County, South Carolina, in the South Carolina House of Representatives from 1870 to 1872.

He wrote to United States president Ulysses S. Grant in support of a proclamation of martial law in South Carolina counties with Ku Klux Klan activity. He compared murdered president Abraham Lincoln to Moses and Grant to Joshua, calling on him in the future as in the past to protect "all wherever the Starry Banner Floats" and to stop the Klan from making the "night hideous with the cries of poor women and children" pleading for their own lives and those of their natural protectors; — their fathers sons and husbands." Hunter protested the Enterprise Railroad over concerns on its impact on the employment prospects of draymen.

The 1870 census recorded him owning $3,650 in real estate and $230 in personal property.

He died of a stroke in 1894 and is buried in Charleston.

== See also ==
- African American officeholders from the end of the Civil War until before 1900
- African Civilization Society
