= Richard Mason Hancock =

C19 African-American foreman and civil rights activist

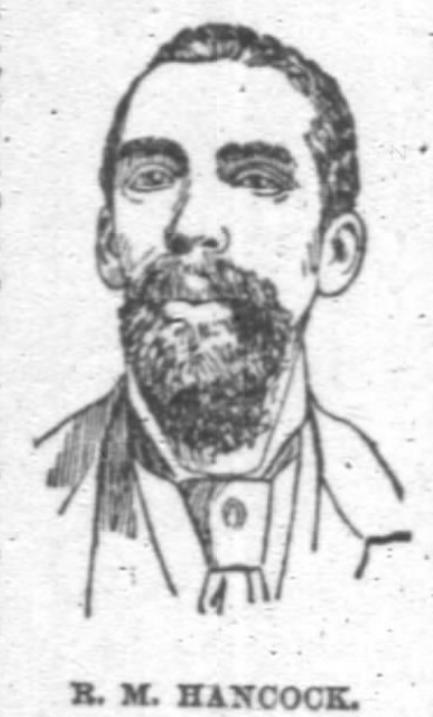
- Hancock in 1890
- Born: November 22, 1832; New Bern, North Carolina, U.S.
- Died: June 5, 1899 (aged 66); Chicago, Illinois, U.S.
- Occupations: carpenter, pattern-maker, shop foreman
- Political party: Republican

Richard Mason Hancock (November 22, 1832 – June 5, 1899) was a carpenter and shop foreman and civil rights activist in the American Northeast and Chicago. He was one of few African-American iron works shop foremen during his era.

== Early life ==
Richard Mason Hancock was born on November 22, 1832, in New Bern, North Carolina. His parents were free blacks. Mason attended private schools, as public schools were barred to black children. When he was thirteen he was apprenticed as a carpenter under his father, William H. Hancock and under builder Uriah Sandy. As an apprentice and in his early jobs he learned the crafts of pattern-making, carpentry, mathematics, and draughting.

== Career ==
As a young adult he moved to New Haven, Connecticut, where he was employed at Atwater & Treat and then Doolittle & Company, both white firms. In New Haven in 1856 he was involved in opposition to the American Colonization Society. He then moved to Lockport, New York, where he worked in ship carpentry, on canal boats. He then took work under Birdsill Holly at Holly Manufacturing Company where he learned pattern-making.

In 1862 he came to Chicago and took work as a pattern-maker for abolitionist P. W. Gates, president of Eagle Works Manufacturing Company. He worked as journeyman for two years before being promoted to foreman of the shops. However, the white employees refused to work under Mason. After three days under these conditions, Mason went to Gates to resign. Instead, Gates hired new pattern-makers to fill the places of the strikers and Hancock continued his role as foreman. In 1873, at the beginning of the Long Depression, Eagle Works went out of business and two superintendents at the company, Thomas Chalmers and David Ross Fraser, formed a new company, Liberty Iron Works. Hancock moved with them, working as foreman. His son, George, also worked as a pattern-maker at Liberty Iron Works.

== Family ==
His first wife, Mary B. Beman, was the eldest daughter of the Reverend Amos Gerry Beman of New Haven CT. Richard and Mary lived in Lockport NY and had two children: Fanny and George. Mary died in Lockport on July 9, 1861.

He married Jane Watkins in Chicago on 6 Jun 1867; she died on 20 April 1879.

On 26 April 1881 in Cincinnati, Ohio, he married Gertrude E. Gross (née Taylor), widow of the Rev. Tabbs Gross, an enslaved man who had purchased his freedom then become a lawyer and newspaper publisher. Richard adopted Gertrude's daughter Constance Gross. In June 1900, "Mrs. R. M. Hancock, widow of Richard M. Hancock" is mentioned as the "president of the Workers for the King circle of the King's Daughters, the oldest society among colored people of this order in the world".

== Public life ==
Mason's work gave him considerable respect and wealth. He was an active republican and vice-president of the Provident Hospital and Training School for African-Americans in Chicago Mason was a freemason and a member of St. Thomas' Episcopal Church.

== Death ==
He died June 5, 1899, in Chicago of stomach cancer, and his funeral was at St. Thomas' Episcopal Church. He is buried in Oak Woods Cemetery in Chicago.
