= Sarah Josephine Meredith Langstaff =

Canadian-American socialite

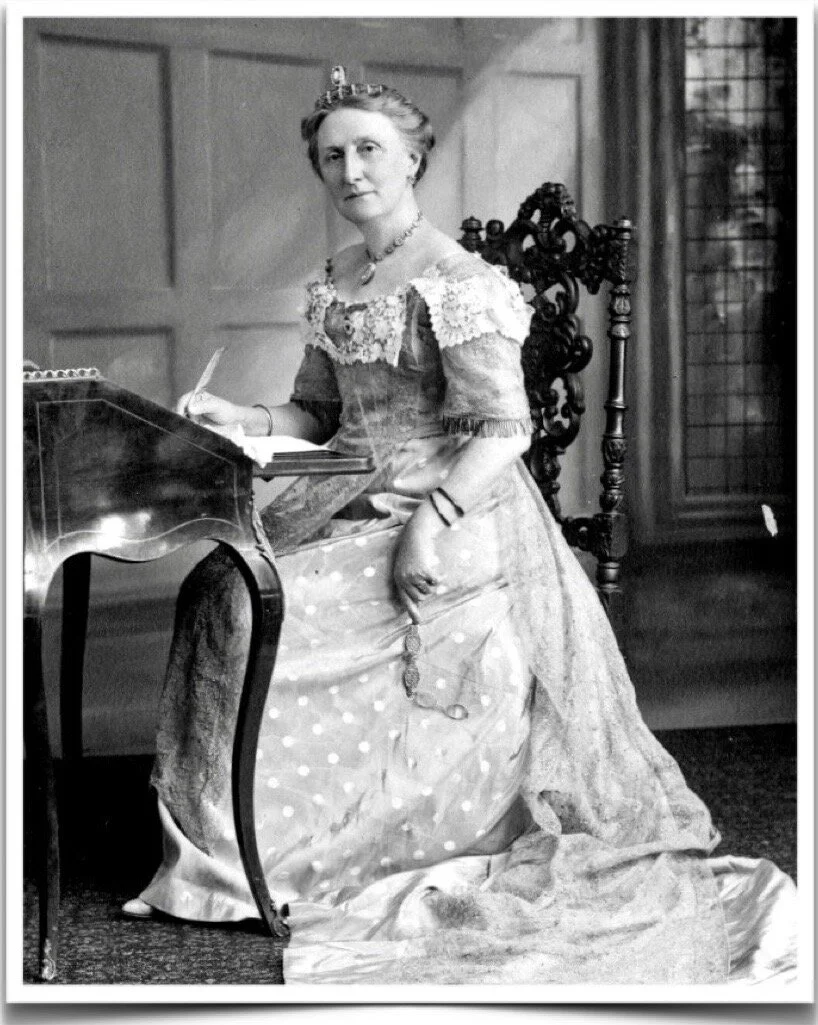
- Langstaff in coronation dress in 1911

President of the Daughters of the British Empire

Personal details
- Born: April 14, 1849 St. Catharines, Ontario, Canada
- Died: June 20, 1933 (aged 84) Stony Brook, New York, U.S.
- Spouse: John Elliot Langstaff
- Children: 2
- Occupation: socialite

Sarah Josephine Meredith Langstaff (April 14, 1849 – June 20, 1933) was a Canadian-American socialite. She was the founder and president of the Daughters of the British Empire and an honorary president of the Needlework Guild of America.

== Early life ==
Langstaff was born on April 14, 1849, to English parents, in St. Catherines, Ontario. She was adopted as an infant by Bridgewater Meredith, a graduate of Magdalen College, Oxford, and his American wife, Caroline Arnold. She grew up in New Jersey, where her adopted mother was from.

== Society and civic activities ==
Langstaff was a socialite who was active in New York society and charitable events. Inspired by the Canadian organization Imperial Order Daughters of the Empire, Langstaff established a service organization in New York for women of British heritage in 1909 called the Imperial Order Daughters of the Empire in the United States of America. She established the first chapter, "King Edward VII", on March 15, 1909. In 1911, she received a special royal invitation to attend the Coronation of George V and Mary. Langstaff was the only American to receive an invitation to the coronation by royal intimation.

Langstaff was an honorary president of the Needlework Guild of America.

== Personal life and death ==
In 1883, she married John Elliot Langstaff, a Canadian physician, and settled in New York City. They had two sons, J. Brett Langstaff and B. Meredith Langstaff. She was the grandmother of military officer and singer John Langstaff.

She died in 1933.
