= Beamon =

Surname list

Beamon may refer to:

- Autry Beamon (born 1953), an American former American football player
- Bob Beamon (born 1946), an American former track and field athlete
- Charlie Beamon (1934–2016), an American former pitcher in Major League Baseball
- Charlie Beamon Jr. (born 1953), an American former first baseman
- Trey Beamon (born 1974), an American baseball player
- Willie Beamon (born 1970), an American former American football cornerback

== See also ==
- Beaman (surname)
