= National Giving Alliance =

American non-profit organization specializing in new clothing acquisition and donation

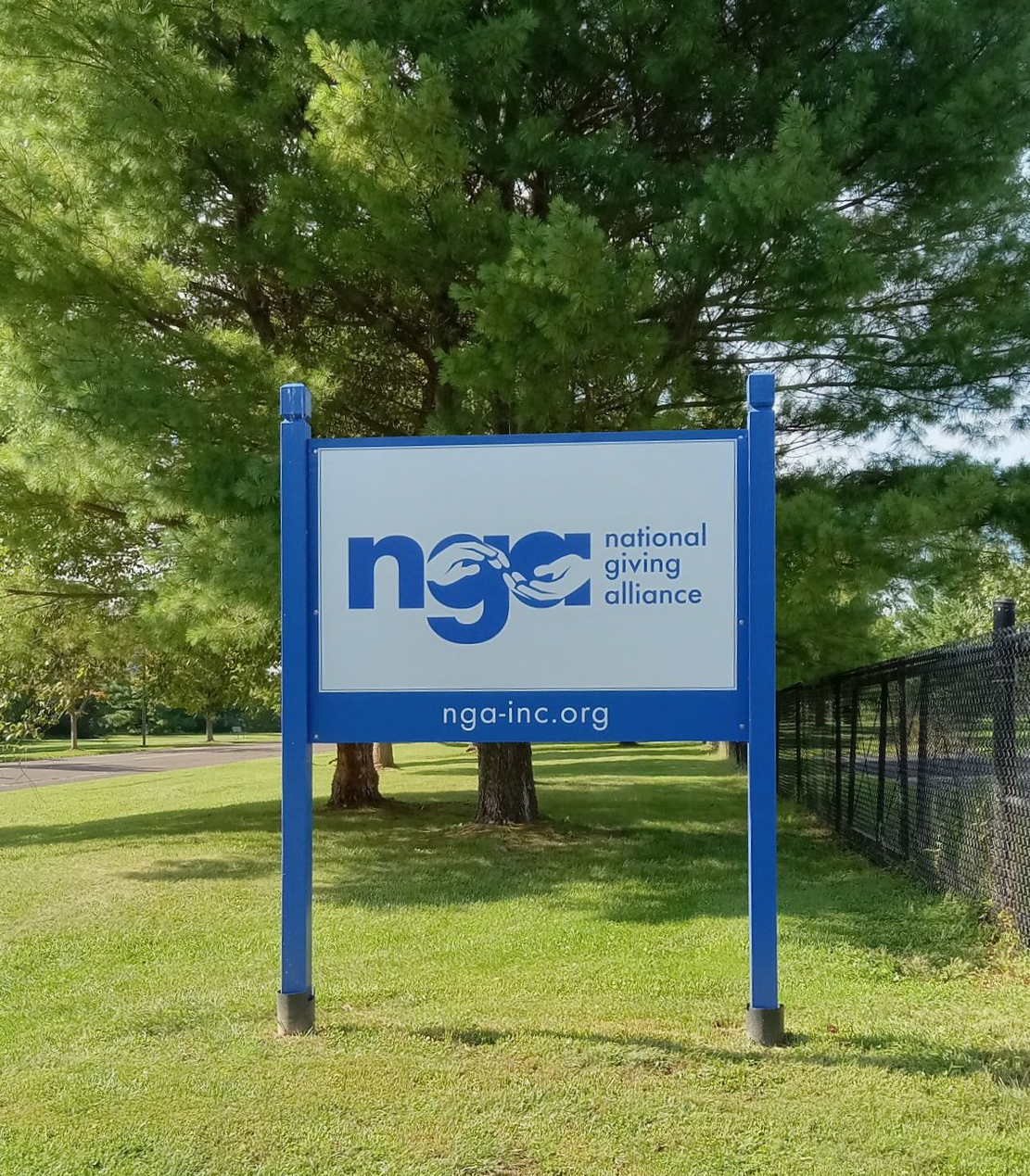
- Formation: 1885; 141 years ago
- Founder: Laura Safford Wood Stewart (1847-1931)
- Founded at: Philadelphia, Pennsylvania
- Type: Non-governmental organization
- Headquarters: 822 Veterans Way, Warminster, PA 18974, United States
- Services: 501(C)(3) Non-Profit, Clothing Charity
- Key people: Lisa Tordo, Executive Director; Chris Rosenbaum, Board President
- Revenue: $472,000 USD (2020)
- Website: https://www.nationalgivingalliance.org/
- Formerly called: Needlework Guild of Philadelphia; Needlework Guild of America; NGA, Inc.

National Giving Alliance, formerly Needlework Guild of Philadelphia, Needlework Guild of America, and NGA, Inc., is an American nonprofit 501(c)(3) organization that provides clothing and other essential living items (all of which are purchased by or donated to the organization new) along with other charitable services to children and families in need in the United States, including unhoused families and those from low and moderate income households.

The organization, traditionally operated by women, was founded in Philadelphia, Pennsylvania, in 1885 and has been headquartered in Warminster, Pennsylvania, since 2001. Some notable figures who worked in leadership positions included First Ladies Edith Roosevelt and Frances Cleveland and abolitionist and suffragist Hester C. Jeffrey.

In its first year, the organization (then named The Needlework Guild) distributed fewer than a thousand items. By 2023, that number increased to over 200,000 per year. Over its nearly 140 years, it has donated close to 130,000,000 new items individuals in need. At its height, National Giving Alliance operated 900 branches across the U.S. As of 2023, it consisted of 15 branches in seven states, and is affiliated with over 170 other domestic non-profit charities and 81 partner schools and agencies.

== History ==
In the wake of a mining disaster in Wales in 1882, British socialite Lady Diana Wolverton gathered a group of women together to aid children at an orphanage in Iwerne, Dorchestershire, who lost a parent in the disaster by knitting and sewing two sets of new clothing for each of the youth, a set to wear and a set to wash, under the philosophy “old garments might pauperize, but new garments equalize.” That British organization was eventually named the Queen Mary's London Needlework Guild.

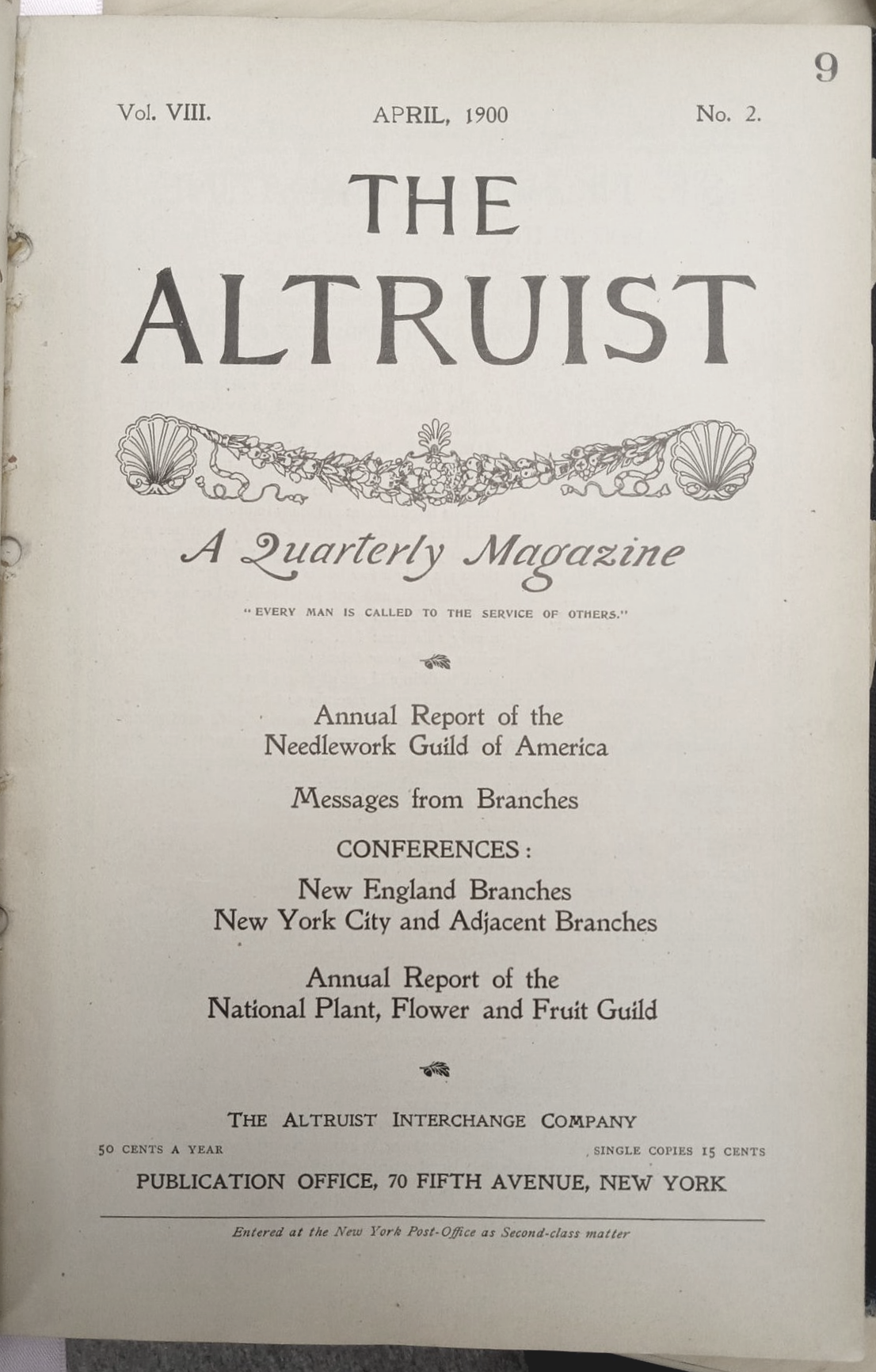
"The Altruist", an Annual Report journal of the Needlework Guild of America, dated April 1900.

In 1885, an American known as Mrs. Alanson Hartpence, travelling through England, found herself so impressed with the work of the Needlework Guild that she enlisted her niece Laura Safford to create a similar organization in the United States. Safford (later Mrs. John Wood Stewart) and six of her friends founded The Needlework Guild of Philadelphia. In their first year, the organization collected 921 new articles of clothing which were donated to hospitals and orphanages around the region. The Guild operated under a principle that new clothing boosted morale of the recipient more than donated used clothing.

By 1891, the organization became so large it changed its name to Needlework Guild of America, and in 1896, the Guild was formally incorporated. Over the next decade, the Guild became affiliated with the American Red Cross, the General Federation of Women's Clubs, and the National Conference of Social Work.

Among the organizations historical leaders were First Ladies Edith Roosevelt (wife of President Theodore Roosevelt) and Frances Cleveland (wife of President Grover Cleveland). Mrs. Roosevelt, who served as chair of the Farmingdale, NY, branch, stated in reference to NGA, “President Roosevelt had once said he knew of no work which accomplished so much with so little individual effort." Mrs. Cleveland volunteered with the organization during the time of The Great Depression. Abolitionist and suffragist Hester C. Jeffrey also volunteered as a Section President.

== Current operations ==
By the early 20th century, the Needlework Guild of America had expanded to over 300 branches across twenty US states. At its peak, nearly 1,000 branches were in operation.

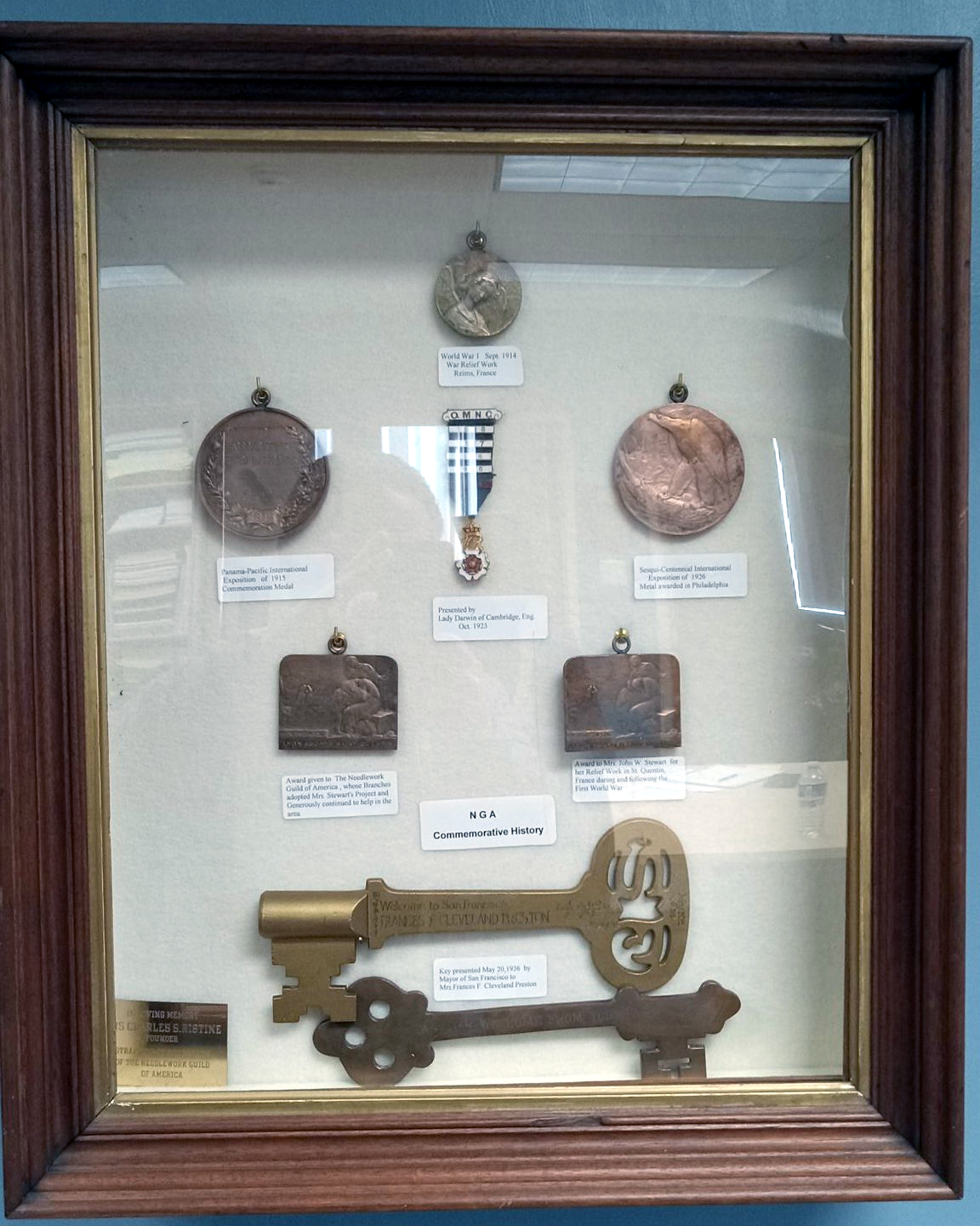
Awards, keys, and ribbons received by the Needlework Guild of America on display at the headquarters of the now-named National Giving Alliance.

In addition to year-round charitable operations, the Guild offers heightened assistance during natural and humanitarian disasters. Some of those events during which the Guild conducted relief operations include the Charleston earthquake (1886), Johnstown flood (1889), San Francisco earthquake (1906), Dayton flood (1913), Hurricane Andrew (1992), Hurricane Floyd (1999), and during the COVID-19 pandemic (2020). During World War II, the Needlework Guild provided clothing to the families of American servicemen.

In 1989, with few items being knitted and sewed from scratch, Needlework Guild of America changed its formal name simply to NGA, Inc. In 2001, NGA moved its headquarters from Center City Philadelphia to a location at the former Naval Air Warfare Center in Warminster, Pennsylvania, which was acquired through a land grant from the U.S. Naval Air Force.

In 2019, the organization, led by new Executive Director Lisa Tordo, changed its official name again, to National Giving Alliance (retaining the familiar NGA initials) to better reflect a wider scope of its mission.

As of 2023, National Giving Alliance and its predecessors had provided over 127 million new garments to individuals and families in need. The organization currently operates 15 branches in seven states, each independent from each other and the national office. Its current operating motto is "New clothes equalize, used clothes pauperize".

== List of branches ==
As of 2023, National Giving Alliance consists of 15 branches, which operate in the following regions:

- Warminster, PA (established 1885)
- Concordville, PA (1894)
- Hancock Park, Los Angeles, CA (1895)
- Salem, NJ (1895)
- Trenton, NJ (1896)
- Fullerton, CA (1900)
- Lansdale-Hatfield, PA (1901)
- Oil City, PA (1903)
- Williamsport, PA (1914)
- Flint, MI (1918)
- Sherman, TX (1929)
- Salem, VA (1932)
- Lakeland, FL (1935)
- Southampton, PA (1938)
- New Hope-Solebury, PA (1959)

As of October 2023, Lisa Tordo is the executive director and Chris Rosenbaum is the board president.

== Notable members ==
- Sarah Josephine Meredith Langstaff
