= Beaman Monster =

In Missouri folklore, the Beaman Monster is an entity named after the town of Beaman. Legends about the monster vary; some describe the creature as the spawn of a 12-foot-tall gorilla said to have escaped from a circus train, whereas others describe the monster as "shaped like a wolf or coyote".

Tales regarding the Beaman Monster have been told for generations in the Sedalia area. One person from Beamon says the legend dates back to the 1900s.
