= Gerald R. Beaman =

United States admiral

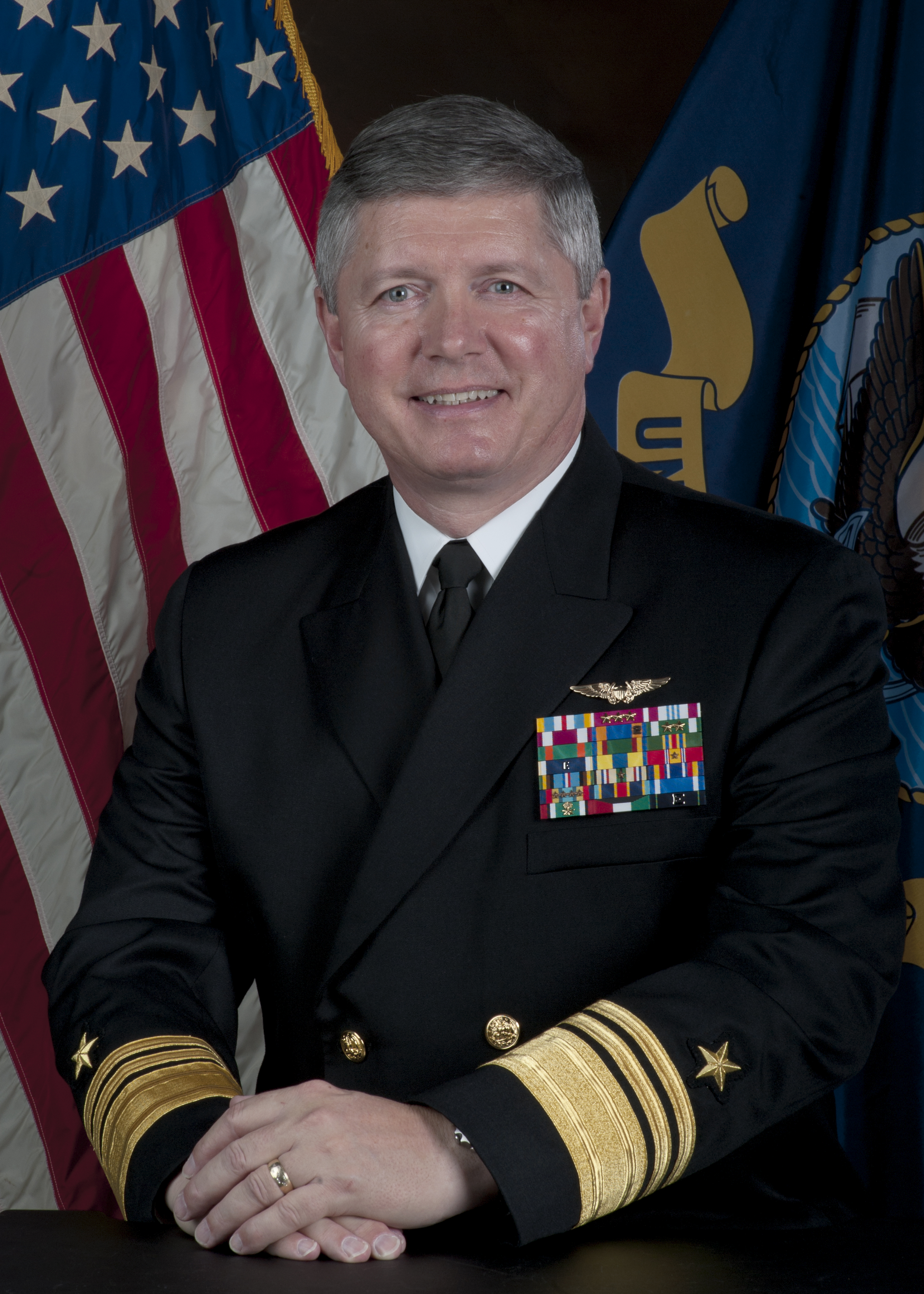
- Born: August 26, 1952 (age 74); Hammond, Indiana
- Military career
- Allegiance: United States
- Branch: United States Navy
- Service years: 1974–1981, 1984–2013
- Rank: Vice Admiral
- Nickname: "Steamer"
- Commands: Commander, U. S. 3rd Fleet
- Awards: Defense Superior Service Medal; Legion of Merit; Defense Meritorious Service Medal; Meritorious Service Medal

Gerald Roger Beaman (born 1952) is a retired Vice Admiral in the United States Navy and an ex Special Agent with the Federal Bureau of Investigation.

His last assignment was as commander of the U. S. 3rd Fleet in San Diego, California. He was relieved by Vice Admiral Kenneth Floyd on June 3, 2013.

Beaman is a native of Hammond, Indiana and is a graduate of Marquette University.

== Military career ==
Beaman was originally commissioned as an ensign in May 1974 and following designation as a Naval Flight Officer flew in the F-4J Phantom II with Fighter Squadron (VF) 121 at NAS Miramar, California before transferring to VF-124 and transitioning to the F-14A Tomcat in 1976. His sea assignments include VF-32 (1976–79), and VF-33 (1986–88), embarked aboard USS John F. Kennedy (CV-67), USS Dwight D. Eisenhower (CVN-69), USS America (CV-66) in support of Operation El Dorado Canyon, and USS Theodore Roosevelt (CVN-71). During Operation Desert Storm, he served as officer in charge of the Navy Fighter Weapons School (TOPGUN) Detachment in Riyadh, Saudi Arabia, and flew combat missions from the Persian Gulf. He commanded the VF-211 Fighting Checkmates (1995–96) aboard USS Nimitz (CVN-68). He was the assistant chief of staff for operations for commander, Carrier Group 7 (1998–99), and he assumed command of Carrier Air Wing 2 (2000–01) aboard USS Constellation (CV-64) in support of Operation Southern Watch.

Beaman's shore tours include flag lieutenant and aide to Commander, Operational Test and Evaluation Force (1979–81), VF-101 program manager for the squadron augmentation unit (1984–86), Navy Fighter Weapons School (TOPGUN) where he served as maintenance officer, operations officer and executive officer (1988–92); U.S. Space Command, as chief, Global Engagement Division; and as commander, Space Control Center, Cheyenne Mountain Operations Center (1996–98). Beaman was selected as a CNO Strategic Studies Group (SSG) Fellow for SSG XXI (2001–02) and was chief of staff to commander, Naval Air Forces (2002–04). He holds a master's degree in National Security and Strategic Studies from the Naval War College at Newport, R.I. (1992–93).

Beaman initially left active duty in the Navy in January 1981 and served as a special agent with the Federal Bureau of Investigation (FBI) (1981–84). During this time, he received seven letters of commendation for his performance, including two from the then-Director of the FBI, the Hon. William H. Webster. Since the FBI restricts its special agents from serving in any of the reserve components of the U.S. armed forces, Beaman was unable to obtain a reserve commission with the Naval Reserve during this period. He later resigned from the FBI and received a reserve commission as a Lieutenant (O-3) in the Naval Reserve in the spring of 1984, assigned as a full-time active duty officer in the Training and Administration of the Reserve (TAR) program, during which time he requalified in the F-14 with VF-101 at NAS Oceana, Virginia. He augmented to the Regular Navy in January 1986.

Selected for flag rank in 2004, Beaman's first flag assignment was as commander, Naval Network and Space Operations Command in Dahlgren, Va., and was then subsequently appointed as the director of operations, Naval Network Warfare Command (2005–06). He assumed command of Strike Force Training Pacific in June, 2006 (2006–08). His next assignment was deputy chief of staff operations, Allied Joint Forces Command-Naples, Italy beginning in January 2008 (2008–2009). In September 2009 (2009–2011), he reported to U.S. Fleet Forces Command as deputy chief of staff Global Force Management, Joint Operations and Fleet/Joint Training (N3/N5/N7). In April 2011, he assumed command of U. S. 3rd Fleet, headquartered in San Diego.

== Awards ==
VADM Beaman wears the Defense Superior Service Medal, Legion of Merit (5), Defense Meritorious Service Medal, the Meritorious Service Medal, the Strike/Flight Air Medal (2), the Navy and Marine Corps Commendation Medal (3), the Navy and Marine Corps Achievement Medal, and various unit, campaign and service awards.

Military offices
Preceded by Richard W. Hunt	Commander, United States Third Fleet; 2011-2013	Succeeded by Kenneth Floyd
