= Daughters of the British Empire =

Lineage society

- Abbreviation: DBE
- Formation: March 15, 1909
- Founder: Sarah Josephine Meredith Langstaff
- Founded at: New York, New York, U.S.
- Type: Nonprofit
- Legal status: Charity
- Region served: United States
- President: Lynda Krupp
- Honorary President: Claire, Lady Turner
- Website: dbenational.org
- Formerly called: Imperial Order, Daughters of the Empire in the U.S.A.

National Society Daughters of the British Empire in the U.S.A. (DBE), formerly known as the Imperial Order, Daughters of the Empire in the U.S.A., is a lineage-based service organization for British women expatriates living in the United States and American women who are of British or Commonwealth descent.

== History ==
The organization, originally called the Imperial Order, Daughters of the Empire in the U.S.A., was founded in New York in 1909 by Sarah Josephine Meredith Langstaff. She was inspired by a Canadian organization, the Imperial Order Daughters of the Empire, to establish a society for women of British and Commonwealth heritage throughout the United States focused on volunteerism, cultural preservation, and community involvement. Langstaff established the first DBE chapter in New York on March 15, 1909. A chapter was established in Ohio in 1914. In 1920, the National Society Daughters of the British Empire in the USA was formally established, at which point state societies began to form under the national organization. The society was formally incorporated in Delaware.

== Functions ==
The DBE supports local and national charities, including food pantries, retirement homes, educational programs, medical organizations, and honor flights for veterans.

The society is led by a president, and the incumbent British Ambassador to the United States, if a woman, or their spouse, serves as the society's honorary president.

== Notable members ==
- Sarah Josephine Meredith Langstaff, socialite and society founder

== See also ==
- Colonial Dames of America
- Daughters of the American Revolution
- National Society Colonial Dames XVII Century
- National Society Daughters of the American Colonists
- National Society of the Colonial Dames of America
