= Amos Beman =

African American pastor, social activist, abolitionist

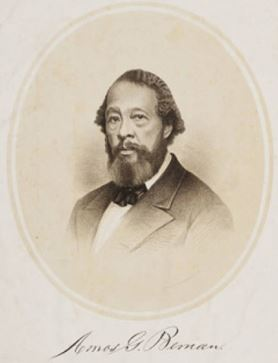
- Born: 1812; Colchester, Connecticut
- Died: 1872 (aged 59–60)
- Occupation: Pastor
- Known for: Abolitionism

Amos Gerry Beman (1812–1872) was a 19th-century African American pastor and social activist from Connecticut. He was a prominent African American abolitionist.

== Early life ==
Beman was born in Colchester, Connecticut, and later moved to Middletown, Connecticut. His grandfather, Cesar, earned his freedom by fighting in the Revolutionary War in place of his master. With his freedom, he took the name Beman, claiming his right to "be a man." Cesar was a shoemaker, a trade he passed down to his son Jehiel, who then passed this on to Jehiel's eldest son Leverett. Unlike Leverett, Amos followed a path of study, enrolling in the Oneida Institute, and was destined to enter the ministry. Jehiel Beman, Amos' father, was the first pastor of the Cross Street AME Zion Church in Middletown, CT, and was later pastor of the Boston AME Zion Church.

Amos Beman was tutored for a short time by Wesleyan University student Samuel Dole, but was driven from the university by a letter from "The Twelve of Us," which threatened his safety. Following this, Beman moved to Hartford, Connecticut, to begin his professional career. Throughout his life, Beman followed in the footsteps of his father, Jehiel Beman. In addition to serving as pastor of an African-American church in Connecticut, Jehiel Beman was heavily involved in several social activist movements. His son would lead a similar life.

== Personal life ==
In about 1835, Beman married Eunice Jeffrey, with whom he had three daughters and two sons: Mary, Amos, Fannie, Charles, and Emma. Their daughter Mary married Richard Mason Hancock on July 20, 1856. Mary, her new husband, and her brother Charles moved to Lockport, New York. In August of that year, Amos's wife and son Amos died of typhoid fever. Six months later, their daughter Fannie died of consumption. In 1858, Beman married Eliza Kennedy Howell, a white woman — a decision that drastically undermined his standing at the Temple Street Church. Eliza's first husband had been John William Howell, a man of color born in the West Indies, and their daughters Eliza and Catherine Romena were listed as mulatto on census records. Both daughters married ministers in 1864: on 1 November, Eliza married the Rev. Hezekiah Hunter, and on 20 December, Catherine married the Rev. Francis Lewis Cardozo, who was the pastor of Temple Street Congregational Church and would go on to become South Carolina's Secretary of State. Eliza Beman died of cancer on 5 November 1864.

Amos's son Charles served in the U.S. Army during the Civil War and died of consumption in 1875. Amos's daughter Emma lived in New Haven, Connecticut, until her death in 1910.

Amos Beman married a third time to an African American named Mary (née Allen), widow of Chester Thomas, but for most of his acquaintances, it was too late for Beman to atone for his decision to marry a white woman.

== Pastoral life ==
In 1841, Beman fulfilled his childhood dream and became pastor of the Temple Street African Church in New Haven, Connecticut. The Temple Street Church was the oldest and most respected African Church in New Haven. Unfortunately, financial difficulties plagued Beman throughout the 17 years that he served the Temple Street Church. Many years, he was unable to take a salary, and he considered resigning from his post on several occasions. Yet, despite these tribulations, Beman's church grew considerably during his time as pastor, adding well over a hundred members to the congregation. Beman was widely recognized as a highly capable pastor, and his followers praised him for his leadership and selflessness. Beman decided to resign as pastor shortly after his second marriage. As pastor of the Temple Street African Church, Beman was a Temperance lecturer, anti-slavery supporter, member of the underground railroad, and an advocate for negro suffrage in Connecticut.

== Abolitionism and social activism ==
Beman served on multiple conventions and councils that promoted anti-slavery causes and African American civil rights. Notably, Beman was a leading advocate of the African American suffrage movement in Connecticut. Yet, his efforts to grant African Americans the right to vote failed, and he subsequently increased his activity writing for Frederick Douglass' North Star and other African American publications. Beman was known for opening up his church to fugitive slaves, but as the Civil War neared, Beman began traveling around the country, lecturing on the anti-slavery movement. His speeches can be found in many newspapers, including the Emancipator, the Weekly Anglo-African, and the anti-slavery Bugle.

Additionally, Beman was a moral activist, highly involved in the temperance movement. He served as president of the Connecticut Society of the Negro Temperance Movement. Beman was also the President of the 1855 Colored National Convention in Philadelphia, held to discuss slavery, suffrage, and moral reform.

Beman kept four scrapbooks of articles documenting important moments and ideas he valued. They can be viewed at the Yale library.
