= Beaman, Missouri =

- Unincorporated community
- Nickname: Show-Me-Town
- Interactive map of Beaman, Missouri
- Coordinates: 38°45′26″N 93°08′01″W
- Country: United States
- State: Missouri
- County: Pettis
- Elevation: 817 ft (249 m)
- Time zone: UTC-6 (Central (CST))
  - Summer (DST): UTC-5 (CDT)
- Area code: 660
- GNIS feature ID: 0729702

Beaman (also Marlin) is an unincorporated community in Pettis County, Missouri, United States.

Beman was originally called "Marlin", and under the latter name was platted in 1873. A post office called Marlin was established in 1873, the name was changed to Beaman in 1878, and the post office closed in 1955. The present name is after Judge J.W. Beaman, an early settler.
