= Jehiel Beman =

African-American minister and abolitionist (1791–1858)

Jehiel C. Beman
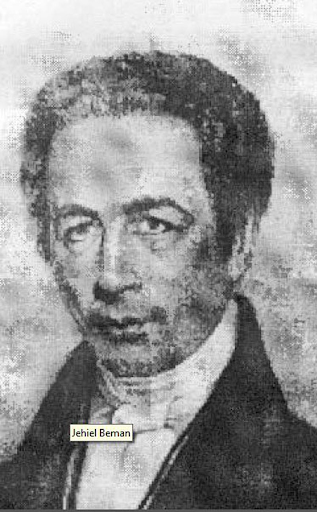
- Jehiel Beman (1843)
- Born: 1791; Colchester, Connecticut, U.S.
- Died: December 27, 1858 (aged 66–67); New York City, New York, U.S.
- Burial place: Middletown, Connecticut
- Other name: J. C. Beman
- Occupations: Methodist minister, abolitionist
- Spouses: Fannie Congdon, Nancy Scott
- Children: 7, including Amos Beman

Jehiel C. Beman (1791–1858) was an African-American 19th-century minister and abolitionist. He was a leader for suffrage and temperance, and he was an agent for the Underground Railroad in Connecticut. His son Amos Beman was also a prominent abolitionist.

== Biography ==
Jehiel C. Beman was born in Colchester in 1791. His parents were Sarah Gerry and Caesar Beman, who, in exchange for serving in the United States Army during the American Revolutionary War, had been manumitted from slavery on 1781 Feb 18 by John Isham.

Jehiel Beman married Fannie Congdon (also spelled Condol) by 1808, and they had seven children. Beman worked as a shoemaker, along with his son Leverett.

In the spring of 1830, the family moved to Middletown, Connecticut. His wife Fanny died on August 11, 1830. Three months later, on October 20, 1830, Beman married Nancy Scott in New Haven, Connecticut.

In Middleton, Beman served as minister for the African Church of Cross Street (now known as the AME Zion Church) from 1830 to 1832. In 1833, he founded a Home Temperance Society in Middletown, and in 1836, he founded the Connecticut State Temperance Society of Colored People. He also began collecting funds to found a Negro College in New Haven, though public opposition to the plan meant no such college was built there. In 1834, he founded the northern Anti-Slavery Society, and his wife Nancy and daughter-in-law Clarissa Campbell (married to Leverett) founded the Colored Female Anti-Slavery Society. Jehiel was also a proponent of voting rights.

He traveled throughout the northeastern states on behalf of these causes, giving speeches, raising funds, and organizing. His writing was frequently published in Lloyd Garrison's The Liberator. His younger son, the Rev. Amos Beman, often collaborated with him in these efforts.

In 1838, Jehiel and Nancy moved to Boston, where he became pastor of Zion's Church.

Jehiel and Nancy moved back to Middletown in 1854, where they were agents on the Underground Railroad. His wife Nancy died in October 15, 1856 in Middletown.

== Death and legacy ==
Beman died in New York City on December 27, 1858, and he was buried in Middletown, Connecticut.

In 2021, the Beman Middle School opened in Middletown, Connecticut, was named in honor of the Beman family.
