= List of works by Maurice Sendak =

The following is the list of works by author and illustrator Maurice Sendak.

== Author and illustrator ==
	Title	Year	Notes	Ref.
1.	Kenny's Window	1956	Harper & Row	
2.	Very Far Away	1957	Harper & Row	
3.	The Sign on Rosie's Door	1960	Harper & Row	
4.	The Nutshell Library: Alligators All Around; Chicken Soup with Rice; One Was Johnny; Pierre	1962	Harper & Row	
5.	Where the Wild Things Are	1963	Harper & Row	
6.	Higglety Pigglety Pop! or There Must Be More to Life	1967	Harper & Row	
7.	In the Night Kitchen	1970	Harper & Row	
8.	Fantasy Drawings	1970	The Rosenbach Foundation	
9.	Ten Little Rabbits: A Counting Book with Mino the Magician	1970		
10.	Some Swell Pup or Are You Sure You Want a Dog?	1976	Co-written with Matthew Margolis. Published by Farrar, Straus & Giroux.	
11.	Seven Little Monsters	1977	Harper & Row	
12.	Outside Over There	1981		
13.	Caldecott and Co: Notes on Books and Pictures	1988	An anthology of essays on children's literature.	
14.	The Big Book for Peace	1990		
15.	We Are All in the Dumps with Jack and Guy	1993		
16.	Maurice Sendak's Christmas Mystery	1995		
17.	Bumble-Ardy	2011		
18.	My Brother's Book	2013		
19.	Presto and Zesto in Limboland	2018	By Arthur Yorinks and Maurice Sendak; released posthumously	
20.	Ten Little Rabbits	2025	Published posthumously	
21.	Hansel and Gretel	2025	By Stephen King and Maurice Sendak; released posthumously	

== Illustrator only ==
	Title	Year	Author	Notes	Ref.
1.	Atomics for the Millions	1947	Maxwell Leigh Eidinoff	McGraw Hill	
2.	The Wonderful Farm	1951	Marcel Aymé	Harper & Row	
3.	Good Shabbos Everybody	1951	Robert Garvey	United Synagogue Commission on Jewish Education	
4.	A Hole Is to Dig	1952	Ruth Krauss	Harper & Row	
5.	Maggie Rose: Her Birthday Christmas	1952	Ruth Sawyer		
6.	A Very Special House	1953	Ruth Krauss		
7.	Hurry Home, Candy	1953	Meindert DeJong		
8.	The Giant Story	1953	Beatrice Schenk de Regniers		
9.	Shadrach	1953	Meindert Dejong		
10.	I'll Be You and You Be Me	1954	Ruth Krauss		
11.	The Tin Fiddle	1954	Edward Tripp		
12.	The Wheel on the School	1954	Meindert DeJong		
13.	Mrs. Piggle-Wiggle's Farm	1954	Betty MacDonald		
14.	Charlotte and the White Horse	1955	Ruth Krauss		
15.	Happy Hanukah Everybody	1955	Hyman Chanover and Alice Chanover	United Synagogue Commission on Jewish Education	
16.	Little Cow & the Turtle	1955	Meindert DeJong		
17.	Singing Family of the Cumberlands	1955	Jean Ritchie		
18.	What Can You Do with a Shoe?	1955	Beatrice Schenk de Regniers	Re-colored in 1997	
19.	Seven Little Stories on Big Subjects	1955	Gladys Baker Bond	Anti-Defamation League, B'nai B'rith	
20.	I Want to Paint My Bathroom Blue	1956	Ruth Krauss		
21.	The House of Sixty Fathers	1956	Meindert De Jong		
22.	The Birthday Party	1957	Ruth Krauss		
23.	You Can't Get There From Here	1957	Ogden Nash		
24.	Little Bear	1957	Else Holmelund Minarik	Part of Little Bear series	
25.	Circus Girl	1957	Jack Sendak		
26.	Along Came a Dog	1958	Meindert DeJong		
27.	No Fighting, No Biting!	1958	Else Holmelund Minarik		
28.	What Do You Say, Dear?	1958	Sesyle Joslin		
29.	Seven Tales by H. C. Andersen	1959	(Translated by) Eva Le Gallienne		
30.	The Moon Jumpers	1959	Janice May Udry		
31.	Father Bear Comes Home	1959	Else Holmelund Minarik	Part of Little Bear series	
32.	Open House for Butterflies	1960	Ruth Krauss		
33.	Windy Wash Day and Other Poems	1960	Dorothy Aldis	From Best in Children's Books: Volume 31, 1960	
34.	Dwarf Long-Nose	1960	Wilhelm Hauff (translated by Doris Orgel)		
35.	The Velveteen Rabbit	1960	Margery Williams	From Best in Children's Books: Volume 41, 1961	
36.	Little Bear's Friend	1960	Else Holmelund Minarik	Part of Little Bear series	
37.	What the Good-Man Does Is Always Right	1961	Hans Christian Andersen	From Best in Children's Books: Volume 41, 1961	
38.	Let's Be Enemies	1961	Janice May Udry		
39.	What Do You Do, Dear?	1961	Sesyle Joslin		
40.	The Big Green Book	1962	Robert Graves		
41.	Mr. Rabbit and the Lovely Present	1962	Charlotte Zolotow		
42.	The Singing Hill	1962	Meindert DeJong		
43.	The Griffin and the Minor Canon	1963	Frank R. Stockton		
44.	How Little Lori Visited Times Square	1963	Amos Vogel		
45.	She Loves Me ... She Loves Me Not ...	1963	Robert Keeshan		
46.	Nikolenka's Childhood: An Edition for Young Readers	1963	Leo Tolstoy		
47.	McCall's: August 1964, VOL. XCI, No. 11	1964	Andrejs Upits	Featuring The Young Crane	
48.	The Bee-Man of Orn	1964	Frank R. Stockton		
49.	The Animal Family	1965	Randall Jarrell		
50.	Let's Be Enemies	1965	Janice May Udry		
51.	Hector Protector and As I Went Over the Water: Two Nursery Rhymes	1965		Traditional nursery rhymes	
52.	Lullabyes and Night Songs	1965	Alec Wilder		
53.	Zlateh the Goat and Other Stories	1966	Isaac Bashevis Singer		
54.	The Golden Key	1967	George MacDonald		
55.	The Bat-Poet	1967	Randall Jarrell		
56.	The Saturday Evening Post'': May 4, 1968, 241st year, Issue no. 9	1968	Isaac Bashevis Singer	Features ''Yash The Chimney Sweep''	
57.	A Kiss for Little Bear	1968	Else Holmelund Minarik	Part of Little Bear series	
58.	The Light Princess	1969	George MacDonald	Farrar, Straus & Giroux	
59.	The Juniper Tree and Other Tales from Grimm: Volumes 1 & 2	1973		Translated by Lore Segal with four tales translated by Randall Jarrell	
60.	King Grisly-Beard	1973	The Brothers Grimm		
61.	Pleasant Fieldmouse	1975	Jan Wahl		
62.	Fly by Night	1976	Randall Jarrell		
63.	Mahler – Symphony No. 3	1976		James Levine conducting the Chicago Symphony Orchestra; album cover artwork "What The Night Tells Me"	
64.	The Big Green Book	1978	Robert Graves		
65.	Singing family of the Cumberlands	1980	Jean Richie		
66.	Nutcracker	1984	E.T.A. Hoffmann		
67.	The Love for Three Oranges	1984	Frank Corsaro	The Glyndebourne version based on L'Amour des Trois Oranges by Serge Prokofiev	
68.	In Grandpa's House	1985	Philip Sendak		
69.	The Cunning Little Vixen	1985	Rudolf Tesnohlidek		
70.	The Mother Goose Collection	1985	Charles Perrault	With various illustrators	
71.	Dear Mili	1988	Wilhelm Grimm		
72.	Sing a Song of Popcorn: Every Child's Book of Poems	1988	Beatrice Schenk de Regniers	With various illustrators	
73.	The Big Book for Peace	1990	Various authors	Various illustrators; cover by Maurice Sendak	
74.	I Saw Esau	1992	Edited by Iona Opie and Peter Opie		
75.	The Golden Key	1992	George MacDonald		
76.	Pierre, or The Ambiguities: The Kraken Edition	1995	Herman Melville		
77.	The Miami Giant	1995	Arthur Yorinks		
78.	Frank and Joey Eat Lunch	1996	Arthur Yorinks		
79.	Frank and Joey Go to Work	1996	Arthur Yorinks		
80.	Penthesilea	1998	Heinrich von Kleist		
81.	Dear Genius: The Letters of Ursula Nordstrom	1998	Ursula Nordstrom		
82.	Swine Lake	1999	James Marshall		
83.	Brundibár	2003	Tony Kushner		
84.	Sarah's Room	2003	Doris Orgel		
85.	The Happy Rain	2004	Jack Sendak		
86.	Pincus and the Pig: A Klezmer Tale	2004		Performed by the Shirim Klezmer Orchestra; narrated by Maurice Sendak	
87.	Bears!	2005	Ruth Krauss		
88.	Mommy?	2006	Arthur Yorinks	Paper engineering by Matthew Reinhert; Maurice Sendak's only pop-up book	

== Collections ==
Title	Year	Author	Ref.
Somebody Else's Nut Tree and Other Tales from Children	1971	Ruth Krauss	
The Art of Maurice Sendak	1980	Selma G. Lanes	
The Art of Maurice Sendak: From 1980 to the Present	2003	Tony Kushner	
Making Mischief: A Maurice Sendak Appreciation	2009	Gregory Maguire	
Maurice Sendak: A Celebration of The Artist and His Work	2013	Justin G. Schiller	
