= Ursula Nordstrom =

American publisher, editor, and writer of children's books (1910–1988)

- Born: February 2, 1910; Manhattan, New York City, U.S.
- Died: October 11, 1988 (aged 78); New Milford, Connecticut, U.S.
- Occupations: Editor, author
- Employer: Harper & Brothers
- Partner: Mary Griffith
- Parent(s): Henry E. Dixey; Marie Nordstrom
- Writing career
- Genre: Children's literature
- Notable awards: Constance Lindsay Skinner Award (Women's National Book Association); Curtis Benjamin Award (Association of American Publishers)

Ursula Nordstrom (February 2, 1910 – October 11, 1988) was publisher and editor-in-chief of juvenile books at Harper & Row from 1940 to 1973. She is credited with presiding over a transformation in children's literature in which morality tales written for adult approval gave way to works that instead appealed to children's imaginations and emotions.

She also authored the 1960 children's book The Secret Language. A collection of her correspondence was published in 1998 as Dear Genius: the Letters of Ursula Nordstrom.

== Early life and education ==
Ursula Nordstrom was born on February 2, 1910, in New York City to vaudeville comedians Henry E. Dixey and Marie Nordstrom. Her father was one of the most famous American actors at the time, and was roughly thirty years older than Marie Ursula Nordstrom; the pair co-starred in the play Mary Jane's Pa and were married in 1910. Ursula was raised in Manhattan until the age of seven, when her parents divorced and she began attending Winnwood School in Lake Grove and later, Northfield Seminary in Massachusetts. Although Nordstrom had hopes of becoming a writer and wanted to continue her education at Bryn Mawr College, she was prevented by her stepfather, Elliott R. Brown, and instead took secretarial and business courses at The Scudder School for Girls.

== Career ==
Nordstrom was first hired at Harper & Brothers (now HarperCollins) in 1931 as a clerk in the College Textbook department. In 1936, she became the assistant of Ida Louise Raymond, the director of Harper Books for Boys and Girls, who helped publish the work of Laura Ingalls Wilder and Clare Turlay Newberry.

In 1940, Raymond announced her plans to adopt a child and retire; at the time, the executive leaders held the small department in low esteem and were nonplussed by Raymond's departure. As her former assistant, Nordstrom was selected to replace her as the editor-in-chief of the Boys and Girls department, a position she would hold for over thirty years. Immediately after accepting the position, she read Little Orphan Annie and Dick Tracy comics to familiarize herself with the things that children enjoyed. In 1954, she became the first woman elected to Harper's board of directors and in 1960, the first female vice president of the company.

The first book Nordstrom edited and published was E. B. White's Stuart Little in 1945, and she went on to edit several more classics of children's literature, including Charlotte's Web (1952), Margaret Wise Brown's Goodnight Moon (1947), Crockett Johnson's Harold and the Purple Crayon (1955), Syd Hoff's Danny and the Dinosaur (1958), Karla Kuskin's Roar and More (1956), and Shel Silverstein's Where the Sidewalk Ends (1974).

In 1950, Nordstrom met Maurice Sendak, who was then working as a window decorator at F.A.O. Schwartz. She was drawn to his "naughty" characters and the complex journeys they embarked on, and helped publish Where the Wild Things Are in 1963. after it had been rejected by other publishing houses. Nordstrom would serve as a lifelong mentor and friend to Sendak; after her death, he told The New York Times: "With her incomparable editorial genius, Ursula Nordstrom transformed the American children's book into a genuine art form."

Nordstrom disliked the genteel, sentimental tone of American children's literature and sought to bring children crimes and punishments of fellow miscreants with books like Maurice Sendak's Where the Wild Things Are and Louise Fitzhugh's Harriet the Spy and The Long Secret. Her unorthodox outlook on publishing and lack of educational pedigree is best summed up by her motto “good books for bad children". This approach often garnered criticism from other publishers and children's librarians, most notably Anne Carroll Moore of the New York Public Library. Many of Nordstrom's publications featured taboo themes and subjects, such as menstruation, same-sex relationships, and racism, and continue to be the target of book ban campaigns today. At some point, she was offered a "promotion" to the adult literature department of Harper, but refused due to her belief that publishing children's books was more interesting and important. She was known as a stubborn but welcoming editor; she disliked both "stuffy" and babyish language, and understood the literary impact that seemingly simple texts for children could have.

Nordstrom and her authors and illustrators felt that the best book is a fruit of a good working relationship between author and illustrator, which gave way to partnerships between Ruth Krauss and Maurice Sendak and Margaret Wise Brown and Clement Hurd. Other authors she edited included Laura Ingalls Wilder, Charlotte Zolotow, John Steptoe, M.E. Kerr, and Arnold Lobel.

In 1957, Nordstrom edited two books that received major awards: Janice May Udry's A Tree is Nice received the Caldecott Medal, and Meindert DeJong's The Wheel on the School was awarded the Newbery Medal. Another double victory occurred in 1964, when Emily Neville's It's Like This, Cat and Sendak's Where the Wild Things Are were awarded the Newbery Medal and the Caldecott Medal, respectively. She is also credited with developing an innovative children's literature genre, sometimes called "concept books" or independent readers, designed for children who have just begun reading on their own. In 1957, she introduced this genre with the I Can Read Books series.

In 1960, Nordstrom published her own children's book, The Secret Language, about a young girl's experiences at a boarding school, possibly based on her own childhood. The book was received positively, despite its inclusion of implicit conversations about lesbian sexuality, and was reprinted in 1988. According to children's literature historian, Leonard S. Marcus, Nordstrom may have written a sequel titled The Secret Choice, but could not decide on the book's ending and ultimately burned the manuscript.

Nordstrom stepped down as publisher in 1973, but continued on as senior editor with her own imprint, Ursula Nordstrom Books, until her retirement in 1979. She was succeeded at Harper's by her protégée, author Charlotte Zolotow, who began her career as Nordstrom's stenographer and to whom The Secret Language was dedicated.

== Awards and legacy ==
Nordstrom's novel, The Secret Language, was named a 1960 Notable Children's Book by the American Library Association. In 1972, Nordstrom was a recipient of the Women's National Book Association's Constance Lindsay Skinner Award. In 1980, she was the first woman and children's publisher to receive the Association of American Publishers' Curtis Benjamin Award.

In 1989, she was posthumously inducted into the Publishing Hall of Fame. In 1998, Nordstrom's personal correspondence was published as Dear Genius: The Letters of Ursula Nordstrom (illustrated by Maurice Sendak), edited by Leonard S. Marcus.

== Personal life and death ==
While working at Harper, Nordstrom met her life partner, Mary Griffith. The pair lived together in Greenwich Village for several years, before moving to Bridgewater, Connecticut after Nordstrom's retirement.

Nordstrom died from ovarian cancer at the age of 78 on October 11, 1988, at the New Milford Hospital in Connecticut, with Griffith at her side.

== Publishing highlights ==
Publishing highlights
Date	Title	Author	Significance
1942	The Runaway Bunny	Margaret Wise Brown, ill. by Clement Hurd	
1945	Stuart Little	E. B. White, ill. by Garth Williams	
1945	The Carrot Seed	Ruth Krauss, ill. by Crockett Johnson	
1947	Goodnight Moon	Margaret Wise Brown, ill. by Clement Hurd	
1949	My World	Margaret Wise Brown, ill. by Clement Hurd	
1952	Charlotte's Web	E. B. White	Newbery Honor Book, Horn Book Fanfare, Massachusetts Children's Book Award
1953	A Very Special House	Ruth Krauss, ill. by Maurice Sendak	Caldecott Honor
1955	Harold and the Purple Crayon	Crockett Johnson	
1956	Harry the Dirty Dog	Gene Zion, ill. by Margaret Bloy Graham	
1956	Roar and More	Karla Kuskin	
1958	Danny and the Dinosaur	Syd Hoff	
1961	The Silly Book	Stoo Hample	
1963	Mr. Rabbit and the Lovely Present	Charlotte Zolotow, ill. by Maurice Sendak	Newbery Honor Book
1963	Where the Wild Things Are	Maurice Sendak	winner of the Caldecott Medal
1964	Harriet the Spy	Louise Fitzhugh	
1964	It's Like This, Cat	Emily Cheney Neville	winner of the Newbery Medal
1964	The Giving Tree	Shel Silverstein	
1965	The Long Secret	Louise Fitzhugh	First mention of menstruation in a novel for girls
1966	Zlateh the Goat and Other Stories	Isaac Bashevis Singer, ill. by Maurice Sendak	Newbery Honor Book
1969	I'll Get There. It Better Be Worth the Trip	John Donovan	First young-adult novel with a gay theme
1969	Stevie	John Steptoe	Written and illustrated by 19 year old African-American author and presented a first-person account, in African-American Vernacular English (AAVE), about the main character's feelings as a foster brother
1970	In the Night Kitchen	Maurice Sendak	First portrayal of full-frontal nudity in a picture book
1974	Where the Sidewalk Ends	Shel Silverstein	

== Bibliography ==
- The Secret Language, 1960

== In popular culture ==
Ursula Nordstrom and her accomplishments are told in Good Books for Bad Children: The Genius of Ursula Nordstrom, a biographical children's book written by Beth Kephart and illustrated by Chloe Bristol.
