= Sendak (surname) =

Sendak is a surname. Notable people with the surname include:

- Jack Sendak (1923–1995), American children's literature author
- Maurice Sendak (1928–2012), American illustrator and children's literature author
- Theodore L. Sendak (1918–1999), American politician
