= Udry =

Udry is a surname. Notable people with this surname include:

- Christopher Udry, American economist
- J. Richard Udry (1929–2012), American sociologist and demographer
- Janice May Udry (born 1928), American author and widow of J. Richard
- Stéphane Udry (born 1961), Swiss astronomer
