= The Moon Jumpers =

1960 Caldecott picture book

- Author: Janice May Udry
- Illustrator: Maurice Sendak
- Publisher: Harper
- Publication date: 1959
- Pages: unpaged
- Awards: Caldecott Honor

The Moon Jumpers is a 1959 picture book written by Janice May Udry and illustrated by Maurice Sendak. The book tells the story of some children playing at night in the summer. The book was a recipient of a 1960 Caldecott Honor for its illustrations.
