= Tell Them Anything You Want: A Portrait of Maurice Sendak =

2009 TV documentary film by Lance Bangs and Spike Jonze

- Directed by: Lance Bangs; Spike Jonze
- Starring: Maurice Sendak; Spike Jonze; Catherine Keener
- Country of origin: United States
- Original language: English

Production
- Producers: Hunter Hill; Vincent Landay; Perry Moore; Allison Sarofim
- Cinematography: Lance Bangs; Jeff Buchanan; Spike Jonze
- Editor: Jeff Buchanan
- Running time: 39 minutes

Original release
- Network: HBO
- Release: October 2, 2009

Tell Them Anything You Want: A Portrait of Maurice Sendak is a 2009 television documentary film directed by Lance Bangs and Spike Jonze about children's author Maurice Sendak.

== Content ==
Starting in 2003 Spike Jonze and his frequent collaborator Lance Bangs began to film a series of interviews with author Maurice Sendak. Sendak spoke about his youth, family, thoughts on death, and his career and some of the controversies that came from his books Where the Wild Things Are and In the Night Kitchen.

== Screenings ==
The film was screened at the Ballard Institute and Museum of Puppetry in 2022.

== See also ==
- Where the Wild Things Are (film), a 2009 adaptation of Sendak's book directed by Jonze, which is also discussed in the film
