= Sandra L. Hofferth =

American sociologist

Sandra L. Hofferth is an American sociologist, professor emerita in the Department of Family Science at the University of Maryland School of Public Health, and research professor in the Maryland Population Research Center. She is the former co-director of the Michigan Panel Study of Income Dynamics and founding Director of its Child Development Supplement.

She is known for her research on family policy, child well-being, and time use, with a particular focus on gender, work, and parenting.

== Biography ==
Hofferth received a Bachelor of Arts degree in sociology and psychology from Swarthmore College in June 1967. She held a National Institute of Mental Health (NIMH) Traineeship in Social Psychology from 1967 to 1968 and again from 1970 to 1972. She earned her Master of Arts in sociology from the University of North Carolina at Chapel Hill in August 1971, with a thesis titled Cooperation and Competition in Peasant Communities under the supervision of Henry A. Landsberger.

Hofferth completed her Ph.D. in sociology at the University of North Carolina at Chapel Hill in August 1976. Her dissertation, titled "Modeling the Contraceptive Behavior of Couples: An Exchange Approach," was chaired by J. Richard Udry.

== Career ==
Currently, Hofferth is Professor Emerita at the School of Public Health and Research Professor at the Maryland Population Research Center, University of Maryland at College Park.

Before joining the University of Maryland, Hofferth was a Senior Research Scientist at the Institute for Social Research at the University of Michigan from 1994 to 2001. During this period, she co-directed the Michigan Panel Study of Income Dynamics and led its Child Development Supplement. She also served as an adjunct professor in the Department of Sociology and a research associate at the Population Studies Center.

Earlier, she was affiliated with the Urban Institute in Washington, DC, where she worked as a Senior Research Associate from 1988 to 1994 and directed major national studies, including the National Child Care Survey of 1990, and collaborated on "A Profile of Child Care Settings." Before that, she served in various capacities within the same organization from 1977 to 1983, focusing on policy research on women and families.

From 1983 to 1988, Hofferth held roles at the National Institute of Child Health and Human Development (NICHD), including Health Scientist Administrator and Expert in the Demographic and Behavioral Sciences Branch.

Hofferth has engaged in research for over four decades in the context of public policy, focusing on child development, family dynamics, and health. From 2012 through 2021, she served as the Principal Investigator on a NICHD-funded grant titled "Time Use Data for Health and Well-Being," a collaborative project with the Minnesota Population Center and the Centre for Time Use Research at University College London.

In 2012, she received the Distinguished Career Award from the American Sociological Association Family Section. She has also served on the Policy Council of the Association for Public Policy Analysis and Management, as Vice President of the Population Association of America, and as Chair of the American Sociological Association's Section on the Sociology of Children.

== Research ==
Sandra Hofferth's academic research spans five principal domains: gender, work, and family; child health and well-being; electronic communication; migration and immigrant adaptation; and public policy.

Hofferth has conducted research over the past four decades on family decision-making, particularly about the evolving roles of mothers and fathers. One of her findings challenged long-standing demographic assumptions regarding maternal employment. Using time-use data, she demonstrated that, contrary to earlier beliefs, employed mothers in the late 1990s were spending as much time with their children as non-employed mothers had in the early 1980s.

Her more recent studies have examined paternal involvement, revealing that fathers have devoted more time to childcare over recent decades, a trend aligned with broader shifts in gender roles.

Her findings also show that father involvement is positively associated with child health outcomes.

Hofferth is known for her contributions to measuring and analyzing child health and developmental outcomes. A significant focus of her research has been the use of time diary data to assess physical and sedentary activities among children. Notably, she directed a National Institutes of Health-funded project titled Measuring Children's Activity in its Social Context, which compared diary-based reports of children's physical activity to objective accelerometer data. Her findings indicated that time diaries are a valid and reliable method for capturing children's activity levels. These insights have influenced subsequent research methodologies, including those used in adult obesity studies. She has also published on methodological issues, including structural equation modeling and measurement bias, and co-edited the Handbook of Measurement Issues in Family Research. Her work has further examined the reliability and validity of well-being indicators in national data sets, including the American Time Use Survey.

Hofferth has conducted research into trends in children's and adolescents’ use of electronic media, including computers and mobile phones. Her studies tracked the rapid increase in digital media engagement from the late 1990s through the 2000s. One of her key contributions was demonstrating that increased computer use was linked to improved verbal test scores, especially among girls and minority children. Further research revealed that texting on mobile phones was associated with higher reading test scores, whereas voice calls showed no such relationship.

Hofferth’s research on immigrant families has emphasized the academic and social integration of children from immigrant backgrounds. Her studies have shown that children of immigrants often demonstrate strong academic performance, sometimes surpassing their non-immigrant peers in reading and mathematics. These findings challenge conventional narratives about immigrant disadvantage and highlight successful trajectories into adulthood for this demographic group.

Hofferth has contributed to policy-relevant scholarship by applying demographic frameworks to issues such as childcare and maternal employment. Her early work examined how families select childcare arrangements and how paid childcare influences maternal employment patterns. By introducing population-based data and demographic methods into policy analysis, she helped clarify the role of childcare access in supporting working parents, especially mothers.

== Honors and awards ==
- In 2012, Hofferth received the Distinguished Career Award from the Family section of the American Sociological Association for her research.
- Author of more than 100 articles and book chapters, with publications in such journals as Journal of Marriage and the Family, Population Research and Policy Review, Child Development, Journal of Policy Analysis & Management, Journal of Family Issues, Demography, Social Science Quarterly, Pediatrics, Work and Occupations, and Young Children.
- Director, Maryland Population Research Center.
- 2005: Research and Development Award, College of Health and Human Performance (now the School of Public Health), University of Maryland
- 1991–1992: Jensen Lectureship, jointly sponsored by the American Sociological Association and Duke University

== Selected publications ==
=== Books authored ===
- Brayfield, April A.; Deich, Sharon Gennis; Hofferth, Sandra L. (1993). Caring for children in low-income families: a substudy of the National child care survey, 1990: a National Association for the Education of Young Children (NAEYC) study. Urban Institute report. National Association for the Education of Young Children, Urban Institute, United States. Washington, D.C.: Lanham, MD: Urban Institute Press; Distributed by University Press of America. ISBN 978-0-87766-586-1.
- Hofferth, Sandra L.; Brayfield, April; Deich, Sharon; Holcomb, Pamela; Glantz, Frederic (1990). "National Child Care Survey 1990: Parent Study". PsycEXTRA Dataset. Archived from the original on 2025-09-27.

=== Books edited ===
- Hofferth, Sandra L.; Clarke, Richard A.; Moran, Emilio F., eds. (2017). The New Big Science: linking data to understand people in context. The annals of the American Academy of Political and Social Science. Los Angeles London New Delhi Singapore Washington, DC Melbourne: Sage. ISBN 978-1-5063-8445-0.
- Hofferth, Sandra; Fisher, Kimberly; Glorieux, Ignace (2015). "Men's family involvement across industrial nations: introduction to special section". Family Science. 6 (1): 240–242. doi:10.1080/19424620.2015.1086206. ISSN 1942-4620. PMC 4858711. PMID 27162562.
- Hofferth, S.; Zeno, T. "How do Children affect the Health and Well-being of Fathers? — Maryland Population Research Center". www.popcenter.umd.edu. Archived from the original on 2024-07-16.
- Hofferth, Sandra L.; Casper, Lynne M., eds. (2012). Handbook of measurement issues in family research (1. iss. in paperback ed.). New York: Psychology Press. ISBN 978-0-415-64821-9.
- Hofferth, Sandra L.; Owens, Timothy J., eds. (2001). Children at the millennium: where have we come from, where are we going?. Advances in life course research (1st ed.). Amsterdam New York: JAI. ISBN 978-0-08-054516-5.
- National Research Council (US) Panel on Adolescent Pregnancy and Childbearing (1987). Hofferth, Sandra L.; Hayes, Cheryl D. (eds.). Risking the Future: Adolescent Sexuality, Pregnancy, and Childbearing, Volume II: Working Papers and Statistical Appendices. Washington (DC): National Academies Press (US). PMID 25032470.

=== Books chapters ===
- Hofferth, Sandra; Goldscheider, Frances (2016), "Family Heterogeneity Over the Life Course", Handbooks of Sociology and Social Research, Cham: Springer International Publishing, pp. 161–178, doi:10.1007/978-3-319-20880-0_7, ISBN 978-3-319-20879-4
- Hofferth, Sandra L.; Pleck, Joseph H.; Goldscheider, Frances; Curtin, Sally; Hrapczynski, Katie (2014), "Family Structure and Men's Motivation for Parenthood in the United States", Handbook of Father Involvement, Routledge, doi:10.4324/9780203101414.ch4, ISBN 978-0-203-10141-4
- Hofferth, S.; Kinney, D; Dunn, J (2009). "The Hurried Child: Myth vs. Reality". In Matuska, Kathleen M.; Christiansen, Charles (eds.). Life balance: multidisciplinary theories and research. Thorofare, NJ: SLACK Inc. pp. 183–206. ISBN 978-1-55642-906-4.
- Hofferth, Sandra L. (2007), "Linking Social Class to Concerted Cultivation, Natural Growth and School Readiness", Disparities in School Readiness, University of California Press, p. 8, doi:10.4324/9780203809754-19 (inactive 5 August 2025)

=== Articles in Refereed Journals ===
- Sandberg, John F.; Hofferth, Sandra L. (2001). "Changes in Children's Time with Parents: United States, 1981-1997". Demography. 38 (3): 423–436. doi:10.2307/3088356. ISSN 0070-3370. JSTOR 3088356. PMID 11523269.
- Hofferth, Sandra L. (2006). "Response Bias in a Popular Indicator of Reading to Children". Sociological Methodology. 36 (1): 301–315. doi:10.1111/j.1467-9531.2006.00182.x. ISSN 0081-1750.
- Hofferth, Sandra L.; Welk, Gregory J.; Treuth, Margarita S.; Randolph, Suzanne M.; Curtin, Sally C.; Valliant, Richard (2008-07-01). "3. Validation of a Diary Measure of Children's Physical Activities". Sociological Methodology. 38 (1): 133–154. doi:10.1111/j.1467-9531.2008.00200.x. ISSN 0081-1750.
- Hofferth, Sandra L. (2010). "Home media and children's achievement and behavior". Child Development. 81 (5): 1598–1619. doi:10.1111/j.1467-8624.2010.01494.x. ISSN 1467-8624. PMC 2941215. PMID 20840243.
- Cabrera, Natasha J.; Hofferth, Sandra L.; Chae, Soo (2011). "Patterns and predictors of father-infant engagement across race/ethnic groups". Early Childhood Research Quarterly. 26 (3): 365–375. doi:10.1016/j.ecresq.2011.01.001. ISSN 0885-2006. PMC 3220616. PMID 22110258.
- Hofferth, Sandra L.; Pinzon, Angela M. (2011). "Do Nonresidential Fathers' Financial Support and Contact Improve Children's Health?". Journal of Family and Economic Issues. 32 (2): 280–295. doi:10.1007/s10834-010-9237-9. ISSN 1058-0476. PMC 3196373. PMID 22022202.
- Hofferth, Sandra L.; Moon, Ui Jeong (2012). "Cell phone use and child and adolescent reading proficiency". Psychology of Popular Media Culture. 1 (2): 108–122. doi:10.1037/a0027880. ISSN 2160-4142. PMC 5036529. PMID 27683624.
- Hofferth, Sandra L.; Moon, Ui Jeong (2012-06-01). "Electronic Play, Study, Communication, and Adolescent Achievement, 2003 to 2008". Journal of Research on Adolescence. 22 (2): 215–224. doi:10.1111/j.1532-7795.2011.00770.x. ISSN 1050-8392. PMC 3438518. PMID 22984336. .
- Hofferth, Sandra; Fisher, Kimberly; Glorieux, Ignace (2015). "Men's family involvement across industrial nations: introduction to special section". Family Science. 6 (1): 240–242. doi:10.1080/19424620.2015.1086206. ISSN 1942-4620. PMC 4858711. PMID 27162562.
- Hofferth, Sandra; Lee, Yoonjoo (2015). "Family structure and trends in US fathers' time with children, 2003–2013". Family Science. 6 (1): 318–329. doi:10.1080/19424620.2015.1082805. ISSN 1942-4620. PMC 4858712. PMID 27162563.
- Moon, Ui Jeong; Hofferth, Sandra L. (2016). "Parental involvement, child effort, and the development of immigrant boys' and girls' reading and mathematics skills: A latent difference score growth model". Learning and Individual Differences. 47: 136–144. doi:10.1016/j.lindif.2016.01.001. ISSN 1041-6080. PMC 4755031. PMID 26900304.
- Hofferth, Sandra L.; Moon, Ui Jeong (2016). "How do they do it? The immigrant paradox in the transition to adulthood". Social Science Research. 57: 177–194. doi:10.1016/j.ssresearch.2015.12.013. PMC 4791592. PMID 26973039.
- Munger, Ashley L.; Hofferth, Sandra L.; Grutzmacher, Stephanie K. (2016-04-02). "The Role of the Supplemental Nutrition Assistance Program in the Relationship Between Food Insecurity and Probability of Maternal Depression". Journal of Hunger & Environmental Nutrition. 11 (2): 147–161. doi:10.1080/19320248.2015.1045672. ISSN 1932-0248. PMC 4962864. PMID 27482302.
- Lee, Yoonjoo; Hofferth, Sandra L.; Flood, Sarah M.; Fisher, Kimberly (2016-04-01). "Reliability, Validity, and Variability of the Subjective Well-Being Questions in the 2010 American Time Use Survey". Social Indicators Research. 126 (3): 1355–1373. doi:10.1007/s11205-015-0923-8. ISSN 0303-8300. PMC 4808299. PMID 27026752.
- Lee, Yoonjoo; Hofferth, Sandra L.; Flood, Sarah M.; Fisher, Kimberly (2016-04-01). "Reliability, Validity, and Variability of the Subjective Well-Being Questions in the 2010 American Time Use Survey". Social Indicators Research. 126 (3): 1355–1373. doi:10.1007/s11205-015-0923-8. ISSN 1573-0921. PMC 4808299. PMID 27026752.
- Hofferth, Sandra L.; Moran, Emilio F.; Entwisle, Barbara; Aber, J. Lawrence; Brady, Henry E.; Conley, Dalton; Cutter, Susan L.; Eckel, Catherine C.; Hamilton, Darrick; Hubacek, Klaus (2017-01-01). "Introduction: History and Motivation". The Annals of the American Academy of Political and Social Science. 669 (1): 6–17. doi:10.1177/0002716216682715. ISSN 0002-7162.
- Entwisle, Barbara; Hofferth, Sandra L.; Moran, Emilio F. (2017). "Quilting a Time-Place Mosaic: Concluding Remarks". The Annals of the American Academy of Political and Social Science. 669 (1): 190–198. doi:10.1177/0002716216683698. ISSN 0002-7162.
- Hofferth, Sandra L.; Bickham, David S.; Brooks-Gunn, Jeanne; Davis-Kean, Pamela E.; Yeung, Wei-Jun Jean (2018). "Contributions of Research Based on the PSID Child Development Supplement". The Annals of the American Academy of Political and Social Science. 680 (1): 97–131. doi:10.1177/0002716218798308. ISSN 0002-7162. PMC 6550474. PMID 31178594.
- Hofferth, Sandra L.; Flood, Sarah M.; Carr, Deborah; Lee, Yoonjoo (2018). "Physical Activity and Perceived Health: Can Time Diary Measures of Momentary Well-Being Inform the Association?". Journal of Time Use Research. 2018: 1–22. doi:10.32797/jtur-2018-1. PMC 6953972. PMID 31930205.
