= Kenny's Window =

Book by Maurice Sendak

First edition (publ. Harper & Brothers)

Kenny's Window is the first children's picture book written and illustrated by Maurice Sendak, and published in 1956. Originally published by Harper and Brothers Inc., it tells the story of a young boy's quest for a garden that he sees in his dream, which involves answering seven questions given to him by a four-legged rooster in that dream. His toys and stuffed animals help him along the way.

== See also ==
- Where the Wild Things Are
- In the Night Kitchen
- Outside Over There
