= Eugene Glynn =

Eugene Glynn may refer to:

- Gene Glynn (born 1956), American professional baseball coach and former minor league manager and second baseman
- Eugene David Glynn (1926–2007), psychoanalyst and partner of Maurice Sendak, the American illustrator and children's book writer
