= Where the Wild Things Are (opera) =

Opera

Where the Wild Things Are, Op. 20, is a fantasy children's opera in one act, nine scenes, by Oliver Knussen to a libretto by Maurice Sendak, based on Sendak's own 1963 children's book of the same title. Knussen composed the music from 1979 to 1983, on commission from the Opèra National, Brussels.

In form and subject matter the work relates to Maurice Ravel's L'enfant et les sortilèges, as well as Stravinsky's The Nightingale. Knussen also included a number of musical quotations, including Debussy's La boîte à joujoux and the bell motif from the coronation scene of Mussorgsky's Boris Godunov. Robin Holloway has noted affinities of the score with aspects of Harrison Birtwistle's Punch and Judy and Benjamin Britten's Death in Venice.

== Performance history ==
The first version of the opera was premiered in Brussels at the Théâtre de la Monnaie, under the title Max et les Maximonstres on 28 November 1980, conducted by Ronald Zollman. Knussen continued work on the score, and the final version was first performed by Glyndebourne Touring Opera at the National Theatre, London on 9 January 1984, with the composer conducting. The first US production was at the Minnesota Opera in September 1985, directed by Frank Corsaro. The same Minnesota production was given at the New York City Opera in November 1987. New York City Opera revived the opera in April 2011. The cast included Danya Katok as Max, Leslie Davis as Mama/Tzippy, and Lawrence Jones as Wild Thing with Beard, Andrew Sauvageau as Wild Thing with Horns, Adam Cannedy as Rooster Wild Thing, and David Salsbery Fry as Bull Wild Thing. Julian Kuerti conducted and Sean Curran was director. This was the first performance where the opera was performed entirely from memory.

== Roles ==
Role	Voice type	Premiere cast, 28 November 1980 (conductor: Ronald Zollman)	Movement
Max	soprano	Jane Manning	
Mama	mezzo-soprano	Gwendoline Neish-Ross	
Tzippy/female Wild Thing	mezzo-soprano	Gwendoline Neish-Ross	Jenny Weston
Moishe/Wild Thing with Beard	tenor	Hugh Hetherington	Perry Davey
Bruno/Wild Thing with Horns	baritone	Jeremy Munro	Cenzig Saner
Emile/Rooster Wild Thing	bass-baritone	Stephen Rhys-Williams	Brian Andro
Bernard/Bull Wild Thing	bass	Andrew Gallacher	Bernard Bennett
Goat Wild Thing	dance-mime, tenor	Hugh Hetherington	Mike Gallant
Sea-Monster Wild Thing	prop	prop	prop

The published score notes that "all the Wild Things should be played by dancers on stage with singers (amplified) off-stage".

== Synopsis ==
Max is a rambunctious boy who dresses in a wolf suit. After he throws a tantrum, Mama (his mother) confines him to his room. Max then escapes in his dreams to a forest, and then to the island of the Wild Things. The Wild Things eventually hail Max as their king, and the "coronation" culminates in a frenzied dance, the Wild Rumpus. In the course of the Rumpus, Tzippy, the female Wild Thing, loses her head, which causes Max to halt the Rumpus. At the end, the dream is over, and Max starts to eat the food his Mama had left for him during his dream time.

== Recordings ==
- Unicorn-Kanchana DKP 9044 / Arabesque 6535-L: Rosemary Hardy, Mary King, Hugh Hetherington, Stephen Richardson, Stephen Rhys-Williams, Andrew Gallacher; London Sinfonietta; Oliver Knussen, conductor
- Deutsche Grammophon 469 556-2: Lisa Saffer, Mary King, Christopher Gillett, Quentin Hayes, David Wilson-Johnson, Stephen Richardson; London Sinfonietta; Oliver Knussen, conductor
