= Seven Little Monsters =

1977 children's picture book by Maurice Sendak

- First edition cover, designed by Maurice Sendak
- Author: Maurice Sendak
- Illustrator: Maurice Sendak
- Cover artist: Maurice Sendak
- Language: English
- Genre: Children's picture book
- Publisher: Diogenes Verlag AG Zurich
- Publication date: 1975
- Publication place: Switzerland
- Media type: Print (chapbook)
- Pages: 16 pp
- ISBN: 0 370 30024 6

Seven Little Monsters is an American children's picture book written and illustrated by American author and illustrator Maurice Sendak. Published by Harper & Row in 1975, it was originally created as an animated short for Sesame Street in 1971 and served as the basis for the Canadian-Chinese-Filipino PBS show of the same name (2000–2003).

== Description ==
Seven Little Monsters is a small format book measuring 8 1/2 by 4 1/2 inches (22 cm x 11.5 cm).

== Plot ==
Seven giant monsters, each named as a number, One through Seven, line up together in the first frame and then start causing mischief. One flies, Two uses his long nose to dig a hole, Three scares a town, Four eats tulip trees, Five drinks the seas, Six sleeps on houses, and Seven unscrews his head. The final frame shows the giant monsters captured and restrained by the relatively tiny townspeople.

== See also ==
- 1977 in literature
- Children's literature
- Where the Wild Things Are
