= Beth Kephart =

American writer

Beth Kephart (born 1960) is an American author of non-fiction, poetry and young adult fiction for adults and teens. Kephart has written and published over 10 books and has received several grants and awards for her writing. She was a National Book Award finalist for her book A Slant of the Sun: One Child’s Courage.

== Early life and education ==
Kephart was first published in Iowa Woman magazine, and has said that she was writing poems from the time she was quite young, when she was influenced by music and the sound of words. In a HarperCollins interview, she stated: "I loved to sing. I loved to perform, with my brother and sister, to the soundtracks of The Music Man or My Fair Lady or Windjammer. I always had rhymes sliding around in my head. So that even as I got older, I would return to Robert Louis Stevenson and Hans Christian Andersen to see how they created what they created. I would read F. Scott Fitzgerald and Ernest Hemingway and Sinclair Lewis, also, to learn about how words fit together. And then, of course, there was Black Beauty.".

Kephart is a graduate of the University of Pennsylvania.

== Career ==
Kephart has been a participant in the Bread Loaf Writing Conference in Middlebury, Vermont with Jayne Anne Phillips, the 1996 Prague Writing Conference in the Czech Republic with William Gass and Jayne Anne Phillips, and the 1995 Spoleto Writing Conference in Spoleto, Italy with Rosellen Brown and Reginald Gibbons, 1994.

Undercover, her first book for young adults, was named a 2007 best book of the year by Amazon.com, Kirkus, and School Library Journal.

Kephart has written for The New York Times, Chicago Tribune, Salon, The Washington Post's Book World, The Wall Street Journal Europe edition, Philadelphia magazine, The Philadelphia Inquirer, Family Circle, Parenting magazine, Real Simple, Reader's Digest, New Jersey Life, the Pennsylvania Gazette, and Main Line Today.

In 2023, Kephart wrote Good Books for Bad Children: The Genius of Ursula Nordstrom, a biographical children's book on editor Ursula Nordstrom's life and accomplishments.

== Honors and awards ==
- Speakeasy Poetry Prize (2005)
- Pew Fellowships in the Arts (2005)
- BookSense Pick (2005)
- National Endowment for the Arts Grant (2000)
- Leeway Grant for Creative Nonfiction (1998)
- Salon Best Book of the Year (1998)
- National Book Award, Nonfiction Finalist (1998)
- Pennsylvania Council on the Arts Top Fiction Grant (1997)
- Bread Loaf Merit Scholar for Fiction (1996)

== Personal life ==
Kephart lives in Philadelphia with her husband and son. She is a writing partner in the marketing communications firm, Fusion Communications, and occasionally teaches and lectures at the University of Pennsylvania.

== Publications ==
- And I Paint It: Henriette Wyeth's World, Cameron Kids, 2021.
- Good Books for Bad Children: The Genius of Ursula Nordstrom, Anne Schwartz Books, 2023
- Dangerous Neighbors, Laura Geringer Books: HarperTeen, 2010
- Anderson, M. T., K. L. Going, Beth Kephart, and Chris Lynch, No Such Thing as the Real World, HarperTeen, 2010
- The Heart is Not a Size, Laura Geringer Books: HarperTeen, 2009
- House of Dance, Laura Geringer Books: HarperTeen, 2008
- Zenobia: The Curious Book of Business, Berrett-Kohler, 2008
- Undercover, Laura Geringer Books: HarperTeen, 2007
- Flow: The Life and Times of Philadelphia’s Schuylkill River, Temple University Press, 2007
- Ghosts in the Garden: Endings, Beginnings, and the Unearthing of Self, New World Library, 2005
- Big Shoes: In Celebration of Dads and Fatherhood, Al Roker and Friends, Hyperion Books for Children, 2005
- Because I Said So, HarperCollins, 2005
- Seeing Past Z: Nurturing the Imagination in a Fast-Forward World, W.W. Norton, 2004
- Best American Sports Writing, Houghton Mifflin, 2003
- New York Times Writers on Writing, Volume II, Times Books, 2003
- The Kindness of Strangers, Lonely Planet, 2003
- Still Love in Strange Places: A Memoir, W.W. Norton, 2002
- Best American Sports Writing, Houghton Mifflin, 2001
- Wanderlust: Real-Life Tales of Adventure and Romance, 2000
- Into the Tangle of Friendship: A Memoir of the Things that Matter, Houghton Mifflin, 2000
- Mothers Who Think, Villard, 1999
- The Leap Years, Beacon Press, 1999
- A Slant of Sun: One Child's Courage, W.W. Norton, 1998
