= A Very Special House =

1953 children's picture book by Ruth Krauss

- Dust jacket of the First Edition, designed by Maurice Sendak
- Author: Ruth Krauss
- Illustrator: Maurice Sendak
- Cover artist: Sendak
- Language: English
- Genre: Picture book, children's literature
- Publisher: HarperCollins
- Publication date: 1953
- Publication place: United States
- Media type: Print
- Pages: 32 pp
- ISBN: 0060286385

A Very Special House, written by Ruth Krauss and illustrated by Maurice Sendak, is a 1953 children's picture book published by HarperCollins. A Very Special House was a Caldecott Medal Honor Book for 1954 and was Sendak's first Caldecott Honor Medal of a total of seven during his career. Sendak later won the Caldecott Medal in 1964 for Where the Wild Things Are, which he both authored and illustrated. A Very Special House was re-issued by HarperCollins in 2001 in hardcover format as part of a project to re-issue 22 Sendak works including several authored by Ruth Krauss.

== Description ==
The story, written by Krauss, is told in present tense from the little boy's point of view (a first-person narrative) and takes the form of a rhymed poem of 62 lines opening with "dee dee dee oh-h-h" and ending with "dee dee dee oh / doh doh doh-h-h-h" and has several lines with words that repeat three times such as "chairs chairs chairs" and "ooie ooie ooie". Nonsense words and phrases and phonetic misspellings of words (or mispronunciations) are scattered throughout the poem. The illustrations by Maurice Sendak, which also precede and follow the text, include occasional supplementary words and phrases.

== Plot ==
An unnamed little boy imagines a "special house" that is "just a house for Me ME" (the cover artwork shows the boy drawing a picture of the house). He then imagines all the special things that make up the house including a special bed, special shelf, special chairs, a special door, special walls, and a special table. He brings to the special house a turtle, a rabbit, a giant, a dead mouse (in a box, according to the illustration), monkeys, and "some skunkeys and a very old lion". The lion proceeds to eat all the stuffing from the "chairs chairs chairs". The boy plays with the creatures "making secrets" and laughing and running and pretending to be chickens and singing until the play becomes frantic and tumultuous and "nobody says stop stop stop". The boy describes how his house is not really anywhere but "root in the moodle of my head head head": a statement which is complemented with images of the boy apparently asleep in a bed equipped with springs under it, his bouncing off the bed, and, on the following blank pages, him somersaulting through space. The illustrations conclude with an image, at the right bottom of the verso of a pair of blank pages, of the little boy looking mischievously over his shoulder.

== Critical reception ==
A Very Special House was published to very strong reviews. The New York Times Book Review called it "a revelation", The New Yorker described it as "original and ebullient", and Kirkus Reviews claimed that "Maurice Sendak's very entertaining pictures are perfect for Ruth Krauss's verses. Together they show just what goes on inside a little boy's mind".

== See also ==
- 1953 in literature
- Children's Literature
- Picture Books
