= Oliver Knussen =

British composer and conductor (1952–2018)

Oliver Knussen CBE
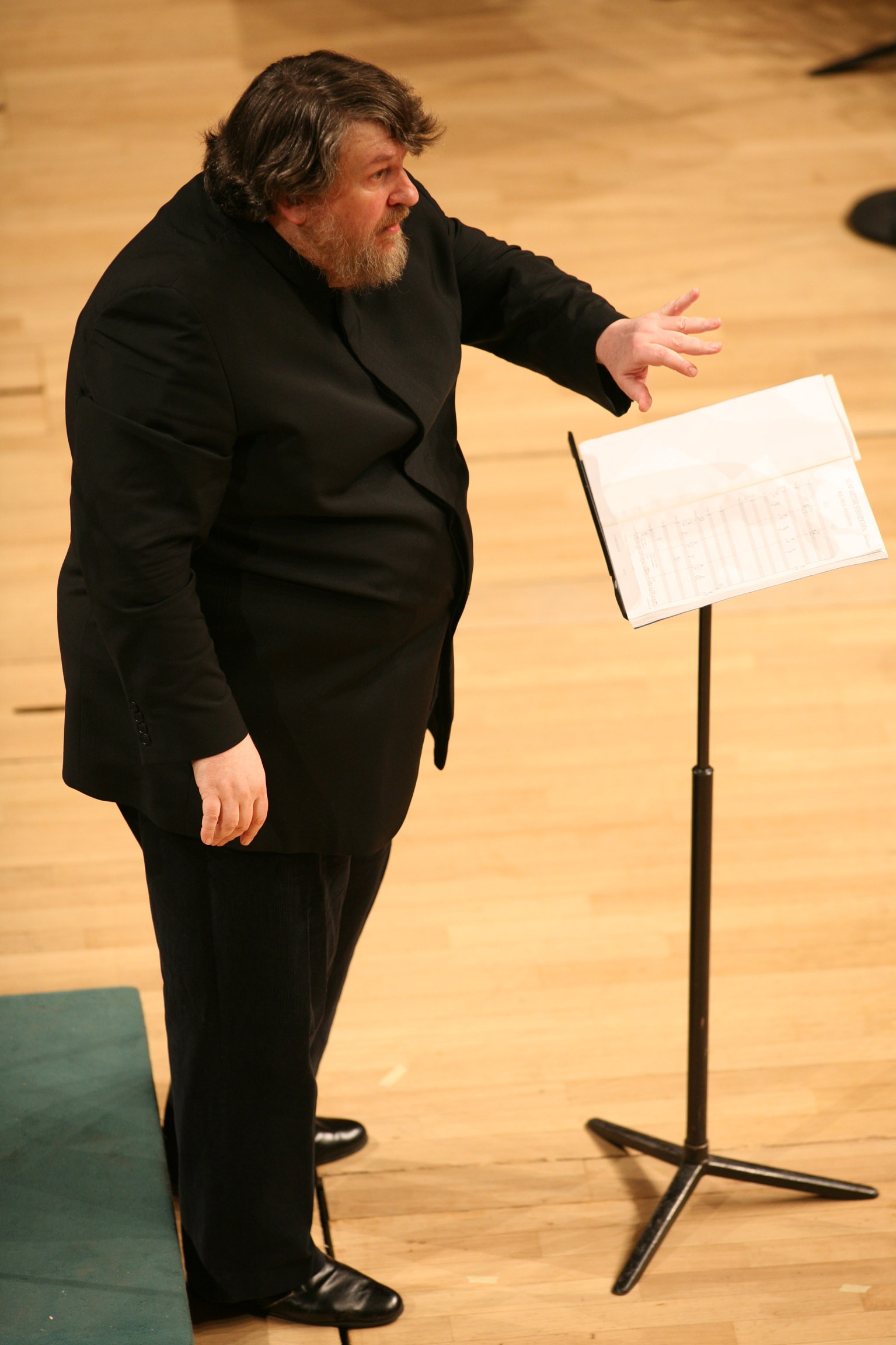
- Knussen in 2008 conducting the Orchestra Mozart
- Born: Stuart Oliver Knussen; 12 June 1952; Glasgow, Scotland
- Died: 8 July 2018 (aged 66); Snape, Suffolk, England
- Occupations: Composer; conductor
- Works: List of compositions

Stuart Oliver Knussen CBE (12 June 1952 – 8 July 2018) was a British composer of contemporary classical music and conductor. Among the most influential British composers of his generation, his relatively few compositions are "rooted in 20th-century modernism, [but] beholden to no school but his own"

== Early life ==
Oliver Knussen was born in Glasgow, Scotland. His father, Stuart Knussen, was principal double bass of the London Symphony Orchestra, and also participated in a number of premieres of Benjamin Britten's music. Oliver Knussen studied composition with John Lambert between 1963 and 1969, and also received encouragement from Britten. He spent several summers studying with Gunther Schuller at Tanglewood in Massachusetts and in Boston.

== Musical life ==
Knussen began composing at about the age of six; an ITV programme about his father's work with the London Symphony Orchestra prompted the commissioning for his first symphony (1966–1967). Aged 15, Knussen stepped in to conduct his symphony's première at the Royal Festival Hall, London, on 7 April 1968, after István Kertész fell ill. After his debut, Daniel Barenboim asked him to conduct the work's first two movements in New York a week later. In this work and his Concerto for Orchestra (1968–1970), he had quickly and fluently absorbed the influences of modernist composers Britten and Berg as well as many mid-century (largely American) symphonists, while displaying an unusual flair for pacing and orchestration.

It was as early as the Second Symphony (1970–1971), that in the words of Julian Anderson, that "Knussen's compositional personality abruptly appeared, fully formed".

His major works from the 1980s were his two children's operas, Where the Wild Things Are and Higglety Pigglety Pop!, both libretti by Maurice Sendak – and based on Sendak's own eponymous children's books. Where the Wild Things Are received its New York premiere in November 1986 by New York City Opera, which also performed the work in April 2011.

Knussen was the head of contemporary music activities at Tanglewood between 1986 and 1993.

A much-admired orchestral work from 1994 is his Horn Concerto written for Barry Tuckwell, which "combines the colorful sound world of early 20th century music with a contemporary approach to time and melody".

He was awarded CBE in the 1994 Birthday Honours.

Knussen was principal guest conductor of The Hague's Het Residentie Orkest (Residentie Orchestra) between 1992 and 1996, the Aldeburgh Festival's co-artistic director between 1983 and 1998 and the London Sinfonietta's music director between 1998 and 2002 – and became that ensemble's conductor laureate.

In 2005, Knussen was the music director of the Ojai Music Festival.

Knussen wrote his Songs for Sue, a setting of four poems for soprano and 15-piece ensemble, as a memorial tribute to his late wife, and the music received its world première in Chicago in 2006. Knussen told Tom Service in The Guardian:

I knew there were a number of Dickinson poems addressed to her sister, Sue, so one week I read all 1,700 poems of Emily Dickinson ... and I copied out about 35 of them by hand, I have no idea where the notes for this piece come from ... It seemed to want to be written ... I wasn't sure whether it ... ought to be let out at all ... because I didn't want it to be a self-indulgent thing. But actually it's very restrained. It's not a huge work – about 13 minutes – but it's a big piece emotionally.

From September 2006, Knussen was artist-in-association to the Birmingham Contemporary Music Group, and from 2009 to the BBC Symphony Orchestra.

As of autumn 2012, Knussen was writing a symphonic adagio for the Philadelphia Orchestra. He was also planning to finish two concertos that he had worked on for several years: one for piano and one for cello.

His recordings as a conductor include works by Modest Mussorgsky, Ruth Crawford Seeger, Elliott Carter, Igor Stravinsky, Hans Werner Henze, Toru Takemitsu, Colin Matthews, Alexander Goehr, Robin Holloway and Poul Ruders.

== Personal life ==
Knussen was married to Sue Knussen, a US-born producer and director of music programmes for BBC television and for the UK's Channel 4 – for which she made Leaving Home, an introduction to 20th-century music presented by Simon Rattle in a series of seven one-hour programmes, which won the 1996 BAFTA award for "Best Arts Series". She ran the Los Angeles Philharmonic's education department in the late 1990s. Oliver and Sue Knussen had a daughter, Sonya Knussen, who is a mezzo-soprano. Sue Knussen died of a blood infection in London in 2003. The Sue Knussen Composers Fund (previously, the Sue Knussen Commissioning Fund) "honours her memory and professional legacy...and...commissions works from emerging composers to be performed by contemporary music ensembles worldwide."

Knussen lived in Snape, Suffolk, Benjamin Britten's base during one of his most creative periods. Snape Maltings concert hall is the home of the Aldeburgh Festival.

Knussen died on 8 July 2018, aged 66.

== Compositions ==
- Symphony No. 1, Op. 1 (1967–68), for orchestra (withdrawn)
- Processionals, Op. 2 (1968/78), for chamber ensemble
- Masks, Op. 3 (1969), for solo flute and glass chimes 'ad lib'
- Concerto for Orchestra (1969)
- Symphony in One Movement, Op. 5 (1969/2002), for orchestra – a revised version of the Concerto for Orchestra
- Hums and Songs of Winnie-the-Pooh, Op. 6 (1970/83), for soprano solo, flute, cor anglais, clarinet, percussion and cello
- Three Little Fantasies, Op. 6a (1970/83), for wind quintet
- Symphony No. 2, Op. 7 (1970–71), for high soprano and chamber orchestra [winner: Margaret Grant Prize, Tanglewood]
- Choral, Op. 8 (1970–72), for wind, percussion and double basses
- Turba, (1971/76), for double bass solo
- Rosary Songs, Op. 9 (1972), for soprano solo, clarinet, piano and viola
- Océan de Terre, Op. 10 (1972–73/76), for soprano and chamber ensemble
- Study for Metamorphosis (1972, rev. 2018), for bassoon solo
- Music for a Puppet Court (after John Lloyd), Op. 11 (1973/83), "puzzle pieces" for two chamber orchestras
- Trumpets, Op. 12 (1975), for soprano and three clarinets
- Ophelia Dances Book 1, Op. 13 (1975), for flute, cor anglais, clarinet, horn, piano, celesta and string trio [Koussevitzky centennial commission]
- Autumnal, Op. 14 (1976–77), for violin and piano
- Cantata Op. 15 (1977), for oboe and string trio
- Sonya's Lullaby Op. 16 (1978–79), for piano solo
- Scriabin Settings (1978)
- Coursing, Op. 17 (1979), for large chamber ensemble
- Symphony No. 3, Op. 18 (1973–79), for orchestra
- Frammenti da Chiara, Op.19a (1975/86), for two antiphonal 'a cappella' female choirs
- Where the Wild Things Are, Op. 20 (1979–83), fantasy opera, libretto by Maurice Sendak
- Songs and a Sea Interlude, Op. 20a (1979–81), for soprano and orchestra
- The Wild Rumpus, Op. 20b (1983), for orchestra
- Higglety Pigglety Pop!, Op. 21 (1984–85, revised 1999), fantasy opera, libretto by Maurice Sendak
- Fanfares for Tanglewood (1986), for thirteen brass and three groups of percussion
- The Way to Castle Yonder, Op. 21a (1988–90), for orchestra
- Flourish with Fireworks, Op. 22 (1988 revised 1993), for orchestra
- Four Late Poems and an Epigram of Rilke, Op. 23 (1988), soprano solo
- Variations, Op. 24 (1989), for piano solo, written for pianist Peter Serkin
- Secret Psalm (1990), for violin solo
- Whitman Settings, Op. 25 (1991/92) for soprano and piano; Op. 25a (1992) version for soprano and orchestra
- Songs without Voices, Op. 26 (1991–92), for flute, cor anglais, clarinet, horn, piano and string trio
- Elegiac Arabesques (in memory of Andrzej Panufnik), Op. 26a (1991), for cor anglais and clarinet
- Two Organa, Op. 27 (1994), for large chamber ensemble
- Horn Concerto, Op. 28 (1994), for horn solo and orchestra
- "...upon one note" (fantasia after Purcell) (1995), for clarinet, piano and string trio
- Prayer Bell Sketch (in memory of Tōru Takemitsu), Op. 29 (1997), for piano solo
- Eccentric Melody (for Elliott Carter's 90th birthday) (1998), for cello solo
- Violin Concerto, Op. 30 (2002), for violin solo and orchestra
- Cleveland Pictures Op. 31 (2003-09, unfinished). First performed at Snape Maltings on June 24 2022 by the BBC Symphony Orchestra
- Ophelia's Last Dance, Ophelia Dances Book 2, Op. 32 (2004/2009–10), for piano solo
- Requiem: Songs for Sue, Op. 33 (2005–6), for soprano and chamber ensemble
- Reflection, Op. 31a (2016) for violin and piano
- O Hototogisu! (fragment of a Japonisme), for soprano, flute and large ensemble (2017)

== Discography (as performer) ==
- Poul Ruders, Hans Abrahamsen – Chamber Works, London Sinfonietta, Paula Records (1985)
- Knussen – Where the Wild Things Are, London Sinfonietta, Arabasque Records (1985)
- Elliott Carter – Chamber Works, The Fires of London London Sinfonietta, Wergo Records (1985)
- Benjamin Britten – The Prince of the Pagodas, London Sinfinietta, Virgin Classics (1990)
- Alexander Goehr – Chamber Works, London Sinfonietta, Unicorn-Kanchana (1991)
- Carter – Orchestral Works, London Sinfonietta, Virgin Classics (1992)
- Goehr – Sing, Ariel, The Mouse Metamorphosed into A Maid, Lucy Shelton, Eileen Hulse, Sarah Leonard, Instrumental Ensemble, Unicorn-Kanchana (1992)
- Ruders – Chamber Works, Capricorn, Bridge Records (1992)
- Harrison Birtwistle – Chamber Works, London Sinfonietta, NMC (1993)
- Aaron Copland – Grohg, etc., The Cleveland Orchestra, London Sinfonietta, Argo Records (1994)
- Igor Stravinsky – The Flood, etc., Charles Wuorinen – A Reliquary for Igor Stravinsky, London Sinfonietta, Deutsche Grammophon (1995)
- Colin Matthews – Broken symmetry, Suns dance, Fourth Sonata, London Sinfonietta, Deutsche Grammophon (1995)
- Goehr – Piano Concerto, Peter Serkin, London Sinfonietta, NMC (1995)
- Knussen – Orchestral, Vocal and Chamber Works, Barry Tuckwell, Lucy Shelton, London Sinfonietta, Deutsche Grammophon (1996)
- Robert Saxton – Orchestral Works, BBC Symphony Orchestra, London Sinfonietta, Oliver Knussen, EMI Classics (1997)
- Hans Werner Henze – Undine, London Sinfonietta, Deutsche Grammophon (1997)
- Stravinsky – The Fairy's Kiss, Faun And Shepherdess, Ode – Lucy Shelton, The Cleveland Orchestra, Deutsche (1997)
- Ruth Crawford Seeger – Portrait, Lucy Shelton, Reinbert de Leeuw, New London Chamber Choir, James Wood, Schönberg Ensemble, Deutsche Grammophon (1997)
- Toru Takemitsu – Quotation of Dream, London Sinfonietta, Deutsche Grammophon (1998)
- Carter – Symphonia, Clarinet Concerto, London Sinfonietta, BBC Symphony Orchestra, Deutsche Grammophon (1999)
- Takemitsu – Riverrun, Water-ways, Paul Crossley, London Sinfonietta, Virgin Classics Digital (1999)
- Magnus Lindberg – Aura, Engine, BBC Symphony Orchestra, London Sinfonietta, Deutsche Grammophon (2000)
- Peter Lieberson – Chamber Works, Asko Ensemble, The Cleveland Orchestra, Deutsche Grammophon (2001)
- Knussen – Higglety Pigglety Pop! & Where The Wild Things Are, London Sinfonietta, Deutsche Grammophon (2001)
- Knussen – Hums And Songs of Winnie-the-Pooh and Other Chamber Works, Chamber Music Society of Lincoln Center, EMI Classics (2002)
- Modest Mussorgsky, orch Leopold Stokowski – Pictures at an Exhibition, Boris Godunov, Khovanschina, Night on a Bare Mountain, The Cleveland Orchestra, Deutsche Grammophon (2004)
- Carter – Orchestral Works, London Sinfonietta, BBC Symphony Orchestra, Asko Ensemble, Bridge Records (2005)
- Julian Anderson – Orchestral Works, BBC Symphony Orchestra, London Sinfonietta, Ondine (2006)
- Takemitsu – Orchestral Works, London Sinfonietta, Rolf Hind, London Sinfonietta Label (2006)
- Knussen – Violin Concerto, Requiem, Songs For Sue, Soloists, BBC Symphony Orchestra, NMC (2012)
- Goehr – Marching To Carcassonne, Peter Serkin, BBC Symphony Orchestra, London Sinfonietta, Naxos Records (2013)
- Britten – The Rape of Lucretia, Kirchschlager, Bostridge, Gritton, Purves, Russell, Coleman-Wright, Summers, Booth, Aldeburgh Festival Ensemble, Virgin Classics (2013)
- Charlotte Bray – Caught in Treetops, Birmingham Contemporary Music Group, NMC (2014)
- Takemitsu – Orchestral Concert (to Mark the 20th Anniversary of his Passing), Tokyo Philharmonic Orchestra, Tower Records (2017)
- Carter – Late Works, Pierre-Laurent Aimard, Colin Currie, Isabelle Faust, Jean-Guihen Queyras, Birmingham Contemporary Music Group, BBC Symphony Orchestra, Ondine (2017)
- Anderson – The Comedy of Change, Heaven Is Shy of Earth, Susan Bickley, BBC Symphony Chorus, London Sinfonietta, BBC Symphony Orchestra, Ondine (2018)
- Henze – Heliogabalus Imperator, Works For Orchestra, BBC Symphony Orchestra, Wergo Records (2019)
- Augusta Read Thomas – Carillon Sky, for solo violin and chamber ensemble - Chicago Symphony Orchestra MusicNOW Ensemble with violinist Baird Dodge. Nimbus Alliance NI 6258

Cultural offices
Preceded by Markus Stenz	Music Director, London Sinfonietta; 1998–2002	Succeeded by no successor
