= The Animal Family =

1965 novel by Randall Jarrell

- original cover
- Author: Randall Jarrell
- Illustrator: Maurice Sendak
- Cover artist: Maurice Sendak
- Language: English
- Genre: children's literature
- Publisher: Harper & Row
- Publication date: 1965
- Publication place: U.S.
- Pages: 180
- ISBN: 0-06-205904-1
- OCLC: 180013285

The Animal Family is a 1965 children's novel by American poet and critic Randall Jarrell and illustrated by noted children's book illustrator Maurice Sendak. It is a 1966 Newbery Honor book and has a significant following among adult readers.

== Plot summary ==
A man, a mermaid, a boy, a bear and a lynx – all orphans – find a home together in a log cabin in the woods by the sea. By sharing experiences and developing narratives regarding their origins, the group establishes a distinct family structure.

== Reception ==
"I had not known that I was waiting for 'The Animal Family'," claimed Mary Poppins author P. L. Travers, "but when it came it was as though I had long been expecting it. That is what happens when one encounters poetry." Reviewing the novel for The New York Times, Travers continues:

There is nothing here of Hans Andersen's mawkish portentousness and nostalgia, no longing for an immortal soul, no craving for a pair of legs. Our mermaid accepts herself as she is, a sea-creature in love with the land, eager to understand its language, willing to submit to its limitations. [...] The story is a medley of lyrical factuality. Never once does its sentiment decline into sentimentality . . . nor our belief into skepticism. There is the truth of fact and the truth of truth, as D. H. Lawrence said, and any child reading this book would know to which category "The Animal Family" belonged.[...] Is it a book for children? I would say Yes because for me all books are books for children. [...] But is any book that these creatures love really invented for them? "I write to please myself," said Beatrix Potter, all her natural modesty and arrogance gathered into the noble phrase. Indeed, whom else, one could rightly ask. And this book bears the same hallmark.

Eleven years later, the Times revisited Jarrell's juvenile works, with novelist John Updike judging The Animal Family the best of his children's books and praising its "exqusite" writing.

[A]ll of Jarell's little juveniles are a cut above the run in intelligence and unfaked feeling. The feeling, however, remains somewhat locked behind the combinative oddness, the mix of pluralism, isolation and warping transposition; these tales of boys active at night and bats active in day bend, as it were, around an unseen center. They are surreal as not even "Alice" is surreal, for the anfractuosities of Carroll's nightmare wind back to the sunny riverbank, while Jarrell's leave us in a mist, in an owl's twilight, without that sense of emergence, of winning through and clearing up, intrinsic to children's classics from "Cinderella" to "Charlotte's Web."

== Adaptation ==
In 2017, Toei Animation launched a crowdfunding campaign under Tomoyasu Murata to create a stop motion animated film adaptation of the story, using its Japanese title: The Story of the Mermaid that went up to Land (陸にあがった人魚のはなし, Riku ni Agatta Ningyo no Hanashi). In two days, the project reached 68% of its goal to create a three-minute pilot to showcase the viability of a one hour film.
