= Eugene David Glynn =

American psychiatrist, writer, and art critic

- Born: February 25, 1926; Passaic, New Jersey
- Died: May 15, 2007 (aged 81); Ridgefield, Connecticut
- Occupations: Psychiatrist; Author
- Partner: Maurice Sendak (1957–2007; Glynn's death)

Eugene David Glynn, M.D. (February 25, 1926 – May 15, 2007) was an American psychiatrist, writer, and art critic. He is best known for his book Desperate Necessity: Writings on Art and Psychoanalysis, which was illustrated by his partner, Maurice Sendak.

== Life ==
Glynn was born in Passaic, New Jersey, and raised by his stepmother, Frieda Helman. A WWII Naval veteran, he attended college and medical school at New York University. He devoted his life to public health in New York, counseling patients, supervising psychiatric care, and training social workers. He was the Director of Clinical Services at the Youth Counseling League and a consulting psychiatrist for the Jewish Board of Family and Children's Services. His writings on psychoanalysis and art were published in Art News and The Print Collector's Newsletter.

== Personal life ==
Glynn's partner, Maurice Sendak, mentioned in a September 2008 article in The New York Times that he had lived with Glynn for 50 years before Glynn's death.

== Death ==
Glynn died May 15, 2007, at the age of 81 due to lung cancer.

After Glynn's death, Sendak donated $1 million to the Jewish Board of Family and Children's Services in memory of Glynn.
