= Sesyle Joslin =

American writer

Sesyle Joslin (pen names, Josephine Gibson, G. B. Kirtland; born August 30, 1929) is a children's literature author. Joslin's book What Do You Say, Dear? was illustrated by Maurice Sendak and it was a Caldecott Medal Honor book in 1959.

== Career ==
Joslin was born in Providence, RI, on August 30, 1929. During the late 1940s and early 1950s, she worked as an editorial assistant and assistant editor in Philadelphia, and was the book columnist at Country Gentleman magazine from 1949 through 1951. In 1950, she married writer Al Hine. The couple had three children. In addition, she served as a production assistant on Peter Brook's Lord of the Flies and worked on location in Puerto Rico.

In addition to writing under her own name, Joslin also used a few pseudonyms. Under the name "Josephine Gibson", she and her husband wrote Is There a Mouse in the House? (Macmillan, 1965). Under the name "G. B. Kirtland", they wrote One Day in Ancient Rome (Harcourt, 1961), One Day in Elizabethan England (Harcourt, 1962), and One Day in Aztec Mexico (Harcourt, 1963).

== Awards ==
- Caldecott Medal Honor, 1959

== Selected works ==
- What Do You Say, Dear? (1958) (illustrated by Maurice Sendak)
- What Do You Do, Dear? (1961) (illustrated by Maurice Sendak)
- Brave Baby Elephant (illustrated by Leonard Weisgard)
- Baby Elephant's Trunk (illustrated by Leonard Weisgard)
- There Is a Dragon in My Bed: and Other Useful Phrases in French and English (1961) (Illustrated by Irene Haas)
- Señor Baby Elephant, the Pirate (1962) (illustrated by Leonard Weisgard)
- Baby Elephant and the Secret Wishes (1962) (illustrated by Leonard Weisgard)
- Baby Elephant Goes to China (illustrated by Leonard Weisgard)
- Baby Elephant's Baby Book (illustrated by Leonard Weisgard)
- The Night They Stole The Alphabet (illustrated by Enrico Arno)
- "Dear Dragon..." (illustrated by Irene Haas)
- Pinkety, Pinkety: A Practical Guide to Wishing (1966) (Illustrated by Luciana Roselli)
