= Mr. Rabbit and the Lovely Present =

Book by Charlotte Zolotow

- Author: Charlotte Zolotow
- Illustrator: Maurice Sendak
- Genre: Children's book
- Publisher: Harper & Row 1962
- Publication place: United States
- ISBN: 978-0064430203

Mr. Rabbit and the Lovely Present, written by Charlotte Zolotow and illustrated by Maurice Sendak, is a 1962 picture book published by HarperCollins. It was a Caldecott Medal Honor Book for 1963 and was one of Sendak's Caldecott Honor Medal of a total of seven during his career. Sendak won the Caldecott Medal in 1964 for Where the Wild Things Are, which he both authored and illustrated. Mr. Rabbit and the Lovely Present was re-issued by HarperCollins in 1999 in hardcover format as part of a project to re-issue 22 Sendak works, including several authored by Zolotow.

== Description ==
The story, written by Zolotow, is told in past tense from the third-person point of view. It does not feature rhyming or nonsense words but makes use of repeating sentence patterns. The illustrations by Sendak support the story by depicting actions not textually described.

== Synopsis ==
An unnamed little girl meets a rabbit and asks for his help in finding her mother a birthday present. The cover art shows the girl asking the Rabbit for help as he sits on a rock. He then takes her on a journey to find the perfect present for her mom. On their journey, the little girl tells Mr. Rabbit that her mother likes "red, green, yellow and blue". Mr. Rabbit then suggests that the little girl should get her mother "red underwear" but the little girl refuses to give her mother such a gift. Mr. Rabbit then takes the girl to an apple tree. She agrees an apple would be a lovely present for her mom. Mr. Rabbit and the little girl then proceed to find another "present" for her mom. Mr. Rabbit suggests that the little girl get her mother something yellow. They both agree that a banana would be the perfect fruit for her mom. Mr. Rabbit and the little girl fill a little brown basket with blue, yellow, green, and red fruits. Mr. Rabbit walks the girl home.
