= The House of Sixty Fathers =

1956 children's novel by Meindert DeJong

- First edition
- Author: Meindert DeJong
- Illustrator: Maurice Sendak
- Language: English
- Genre: Children's novel
- Publisher: Harper & Brothers
- Publication date: 1956
- Publication place: United States
- Media type: Print (Hardback & Paperback)
- OCLC: 172356

The House of Sixty Fathers is a 1956 children's novel by Meindert DeJong with illustrations by Maurice Sendak. The novel was based on the author's own experiences as a military flier in China during the Second World War.

The book won the Josette Frank Award (then named the Children's Book Award of the Child Study Association) in 1956. It was also named a Newbery Honor Book, won the Hans Christian Andersen Award, and was named an ALA Notable Children's Book — all in 1957.

== Plot summary ==
The story is set during the Second Sino-Japanese War. Japan has invaded China, and the Japanese attack the village where young Tien Pao and his family live. The family flees upriver in an abandoned sampan to the town of Hengyang. While the boy's parents go to a nearby American airfield to seek work with his younger sister, Tien Pao spends the day taking care of the sampan as well as three ducklings and the family pig, named Glory of the Republic. During a rainstorm, while Tien Pao is asleep, the sampan breaks loose from its moorings. Tien Pao is swept down the river. After a night in the raging waters, the storm abates, and Tien Pao finds himself floating in the area where his village used to be. He releases the ducklings in the river and heads for higher ground with his pig. He must travel over high mountains and through dangerous Japanese occupied territory to reach Hengyang.

As he journeys home, Tien Pao begins to starve and suffer from exhaustion. He witnesses terrifying scenes of violence. Once, he sees a plane strafe a Japanese military convoy, only to be shot down over the forest. Sitting on a big rock, Tien Pao watches the entire skirmish. He later comes upon the injured American pilot (whom he had met before during his stay at Hengyang river) and helps the man return to his unit. The American pilot is a member of the Flying Tigers, and the sixty men in the unit become the "sixty fathers" who care for Tien Pao. Tien Pao exhibits a strong will to continue to try to find his parents, an incredibly difficult task; with the help of the American pilot he finds an airfield similar to the one his parents once worked on. The pilot only wishes to show Tien Pao an airfield but Tien Pao finds his mother and is at last reunited with his family.

== Awards ==
The novel won the annual Child Study Association of America's Children's Book Award for novels that realistically portray contemporary issues. It was also a Newbery Honor winner for 1957. Meindert DeJong was awarded the Hans Christian Andersen Award for his literary works, including The House of Sixty Fathers, in 1960.
