= Robert Garvey =

American writer

Robert Garvey (1908–1983) was a Jewish author. He served as Executive Secretary of the Jewish Book Publishers Association (1972–1976). Robert Garvey died in New York in 1983.

== Partial bibliography ==
- Good Shabbos, Everybody! (illustrated by Maurice Sendak, 1951)
- A First Chanukah Word Book (1952)
- The Ghosts of Camp J (1955)
- Holidays are Nice: Around the Year With the Jewish Child (illustrated by Arnold Lobel and Ezekiel Schloss, 1960)
- Happy Holiday (1960)
- What Feast? And Other Tales (1974)
- The Hanukah Play (1979)
