= Edward Tripp =

American writer

Edward Tripp (March 9, 1920, National City, California – April 6, 1999, Franklin, North Carolina) lived in Hamden, Connecticut and died in 1999 at the age of 79. He worked as a children's literature author, and an editor at Thomas Y. Crowell before becoming editor-in-chief at Yale University Press. He is best known for his books The Tin Fiddle (1954) (illustrated by Maurice Sendak) and The New Tuba (1955) (illustrated by Veronica Reed), as well as his work on the Meridian Handbook of Classical Mythology (1970), previously titled Crowell's Handbook of Classical Mythology. The Crowell\Meridian Handbook of Classical Mythology functions as a reader's companion to classical mythology and is formatted as an alphabetical encyclopedia that offers direct transliteration of Greek mythology.
