= A Tree Is Nice =

1956 picture book by Janice May Udry

A Tree is Nice
- Front cover
- Author: Janice May Udry
- Illustrator: Marc Simont
- Cover artist: Marc Simont
- Genre: Children's picture book
- Publisher: Harper and Brothers
- Publication date: 1956
- Publication place: United States
- ISBN: 0-06-443147-9
- OCLC: 29000764

A Tree is Nice is a children's picture book written by American writer Janice May Udry and illustrated by American artist Marc Simont. It was published by Harper and Brothers in 1956, and won the Caldecott Medal in 1957. In a retrospective essay about the Caldecott Medal-winning books from 1956 to 1965, Norma R. Fryatt wrote, "The book becomes one of the most convincing sermons on conservation yet done for young children."

The book tells Udry's poetic opinion on why trees are nice using a "kind of poetic simplicity that is innate in small children", according to Kirkus Reviews. Half of the book's illustrations are in full color.

Awards
Preceded by Frog Went A-Courtin'	Caldecott Medal recipient 1957	Succeeded by Time of Wonder
