= The Golden Key (MacDonald book) =

1867 fairy tale by George MacDonald

The Golden Key is a fairy tale written by George MacDonald. It was published in Dealings with the Fairies (1867).

It is particularly noted for the intensity of the suggestive imagery, which implies a spiritual meaning to the story without providing a transparent allegory for the events described.

== Plot summary ==
A young boy listens to his Great-aunt's stories about a magical golden key found at the end of a rainbow. One day, he sees an immense rainbow and sets out to find its end in an enchanted forest. As the forest is in Fairyland where everything has an opposite effect, the rainbow only glows brighter when the sun sets. He finds the key, then it dawns on him that he does not know where the lock is.

In the same village on the border of this forest, a merchant's neglected daughter is frightened by the fairies. Their first attempt fails but when they make her think the three bears are coming into her bedroom, she flees into the woods.

A tree tries to trap her, but a feathered airborne fish frees her, then leads her to a wise woman's cottage. A pot is boiling there, and the air fish flies into it. The lady asks her name; the girl says that the servants always called her Tangle, and the lady decides that although her tangled hair was their fault for not looking after her, Tangle is a pretty name. She says she is called Grandmother, and that it has been three years since Tangle ran away from the "bears". She has the girl washed by fish and dresses her. Then they eat the air fish for dinner after the lady assures her that the air fish had voluntarily gone into the pot to be their food, and the cooking pot produces a little-winged figure, who flies off.

The lady sends another air fish after the young man at the foot of the rainbow. At supper the next day, the young man, Mossy, arrives. The lady tells Mossy that if he searches for the keyhole, he will find it, and sends Tangle with him. In their wanderings, they come across a valley where beautiful shadows fill the air, where they stay, grow old, and then resolve to find the land the marvelous shadows fall from; but they become separated so they each continue their journey alone.

Tangle meets with the winged aëranth (air-flower) that used to be the fish, who leads her to the mountain. There she meets the Old Man of the Sea. He cannot tell her the way to the land from which the shadows fall and sends her to his brother the Old Man of the Earth. He also does not know and sends her to the Old Man of the Fire.

Then the Old Man of the Earth stooped over the floor of the cave, raised a huge stone from it, and left it leaning. It disclosed a great hole that went plumb-down.
"That is the way," he said.
"But there are no stairs."
"You must throw yourself in. There is no other way."

She throws herself in and at the end of the hole, finds the Old Man of the Fire. This Old Man turns out to be youngest of all, a wise child arranging colored spheres in a significant way. After giving her protection from the fiery path, he sends her out following a snake, which will lead her to that land.

Mossy also finds the Man of the Sea, rightly recognizing him as death, and he gains the power to walk across the sea. After climbing a precipice, he enters a chamber where the colors of the rainbow appear as columns of light. Tangle is waiting for him. She shows him another door that his key unlocks, opening onto a glowing stairway to the land they were searching for, from which the shadows fall. As they start to climb, the story ends.

== Interpretation ==
Many of the central symbols of "The Golden Key" revolve around death and the hope of an afterlife. MacDonald draws on Christian, classical, and Norse mythology. Bifrost is a rainbow bridge that reaches between Midgard (Earth) and Asgard, the realm of the gods. This bridge connects to the divine.

== Editions ==
An edition was published in 1967 by Farrar, Straus and Giroux with illustrations by Maurice Sendak and an Afterword by W. H. Auden.

A 2016 edition produced by Eerdmans Books for Young Readers was illustrated by Ruth Sanderson.
