= Outside Over There =

1981 picture book by Maurice Sendak

- Author: Maurice Sendak
- Illustrator: Sendak
- Cover artist: Sendak
- Language: English
- Genre: Picture book
- Publisher: Lothrop, Lee and Shepard Books
- Publication date: October 19, 1981
- Publication place: United States
- Media type: Print
- Pages: 40 pp
- ISBN: 0-06-443185-1

Outside Over There is a picture book for children written and illustrated by Maurice Sendak. It concerns a young girl named Ida, who must rescue her baby sister after the child has been stolen by goblins. Outside Over There has been described by Sendak as part of a type of trilogy based on psychological development from In the Night Kitchen (toddler) to Where the Wild Things Are (pre-school) to Outside Over There (pre-adolescent).

== Synopsis ==
The father of Ida, the main character, is away at sea. She plays her horn each night to make her baby sister sleep. One night while she is playing her horn and not paying attention to the baby, goblins sneak in through the window and steal her baby sister away, replacing her with a changeling made of ice. The changeling melts as Ida cradles it and Ida, realizing what has happened, blows her wonder horn, dons her mother's yellow rain cloak, and sets off after her baby sister. However, because she exits the window backwards she enters Outside Over There where she cannot find the goblins or her sister. She then hears her father's voice telling her to turn around into the rain. She does so and interrupts the goblins, now in the form of babies, in the midst of a wedding. To find her sister among the crying babies, Ida plays a captivating tune on her horn until the goblins dance in a frenzy and fall into a stream. Ida then picks up her sister and heads home to her mother who has received a letter from her father where he promises to come home one day and asks Ida to watch over her sister.

== Inspiration ==
In the documentary Tell Them Anything You Want: A Portrait of Maurice Sendak (2009), Sendak describes his awareness in 1932 (around age 4) of the sensational Lindbergh baby kidnapping case, including a newspaper photograph of the child's remains. That experience showed him the mortality and peril of children, which the adult Sendak expressed in many books. Outside Over There draws more specifically from the Lindbergh case. A child is stolen from its crib through a window, accessed by a ladder, and one of the illustrations of the lost baby is a deliberate portrait of the infant Charles Lindbergh Jr. The theme of a protective sister is drawn from Sendak's own childhood, in which his older sister was his primary caregiver and devoted playmate.

== Awards ==
Some honors for Outside Over There:

- National Book Award for Children's Books, category Picture Books (hardcover) (Note: Picture books were separately recognized for only two years in National Book Awards history, during four years when there were dual hardcover and paperback awards in many categories.)
- School Library Journal Best Book
- Caldecott Honor Book 1982
- Boston Globe–Horn Book Awards 1981
- Library of Congress Children's Books

== In other media ==
Jim Henson's 1986 film Labyrinth has conceptual similarities to the book. The similarities led to Sendak sending a legal complaint to Henson asking to stop production on the film; however, it was eventually settled. The closing credits of the film state "Jim Henson acknowledges his debt to the works of Maurice Sendak".

The book is featured in the 2003 Japanese film Café Lumière. It is used to help the main character, a young Japanese student named Yoko, interpret a dream.

English singer-songwriter Will Varley sings a song of the same title inspired by the book on his 2015 album Postcards from Ursa Minor.

In Victor LaValle's 2017 book The Changeling, the main character recites passages from Outside Over There in an effort to understand his son's disappearance.

Outside Over There plays an enormous role in the last section of Kenzaburo Oe’s The Changeling.

== See also ==
- 1981 in literature
- Children's literature
