= J. Richard Udry =

American sociologist and demographer

- Born: October 12, 1928; Covington, Kentucky, US
- Died: July 29, 2012 (aged 83); Chapel Hill, North Carolina, US
- Other name: Dick Udry
- Education: University of Southern California (Ph.D., 1960)
- Known for: Add Health
- Spouse: Janice May Udry (1950 – his death)
- Children: 2 daughters
- Awards: Inducted into the American Academy of Arts and Sciences (1997); Sierra Club's LeConte Award (2003)
- Scientific career
- Fields: Demography; Public health Sociology
- Workplaces: University of North Carolina at Chapel Hill
- Thesis: The Construction And Empirical Test Of A Theory Based On Selected Variables In Small-Group Interaction (1960)
- Doctoral advisor: Harvey J. Locke

J. Richard Udry (October 12, 1928 – July 29, 2012) was an American sociologist and demographer, known for his work on the biological and sociological factors affecting human behavior.

== Career ==
He was Kenan Distinguished Professor of maternal and child health in the University of North Carolina at Chapel Hill (UNC) Gillings School of Global Public Health and professor of sociology in the UNC College of Arts and Sciences. He joined the faculty at UNC from 1965, and remained there for the rest of his career. He also directed UNC's Carolina Population Center (CPC) from 1977 to 1992. He is known for designing the National Longitudinal Study of Adolescent to Adult Health (originally known as the National Longitudinal Study of Adolescent Health), which he also secured funding for and directed from 1994 to 2004. He served as president of the Population Association of America in 1994, and served two terms as president of the Society for the Study of Social Biology.

In the popular media, he is known for a 1970 study he conducted which concluded that, contrary to popular belief, the Northeast blackout of 1965 had no effect on the number of births in New York City. The study was cited, for example, in a 2009 MSNBC article about claims that the United States' birth rate had increased nine months after the 2008 United States presidential election.
