= Hyman Chanover =

American writer

Hyman Chanover (April 19, 1920 – April 26, 1998) was a Rabbi, educationalist and author. His book Happy Hanukah Everybody (1969) was illustrated by Hans Christian Andersen Award winner Maurice Sendak.

== Life ==
Chanover was born in Markow to Abraham Isaac and Anna Certner Chanover, in Poland but within a year had emigrated to the United States. In 1944 he married Alice S. Fischer and had two sons. He died April 26, 1998.

== Career ==
Chanover studied at the Teachers Institute of Yeshiva University, Yeshiva College and New York University. Initially was a rabbi at Congregation Ahavath Israel in Philadelphia and Temple Israel in Albany, New York. He subsequently devoted himself to Jewish education particularly in association with the American Association of Jewish Education. He was also adjunct professor of education at New York University and later a professor at Baltimore Hebrew College.

== Contribution ==
He developed and wrote textbooks, prayer books, story books for classroom use and curricula and guides for teachers. He was a member of the National Council of the Boy Scouts of America.

== Partial bibliography ==
- Pesah is Here (1956)
- Blessed Event (1956)
- Teaching the Haggadah (1964)
- Happy Hanukah Everybody (1969) (illustrated by Maurice Sendak)
- A Book of Prayer for Junior Congregations (1986)
- Service for the High Holy Days (1996)
