= Jack Sendak =

American writer (1923–1995)

- Born: July 20, 1923
- Died: February 3, 1995 (aged 71) New Jersey
- Occupation: Children's literature author

Jack Sendak (July 20, 1923 – February 3, 1995) was an American children's literature author. He was the brother of Maurice Sendak.

Sendak served in the U.S. Army during the Second World War and later worked for Emerson Radio and Television, where he met his wife, Gussie Weiss. He credited his father with inspiring his storytelling talent through his regular bedtime folk tales. Two of his books, Circus Girl (1957) and The Happy Rain (1956), were illustrated by his brother. Two other books were illustrated by Mitchell Miller Jr. (b. 1947, son of popular conductor Mitch Miller, whom Maurice Sendak described as "one of the most gifted of the new generation of illustrators"). Jack's 1971 book, The Magic Tears, illustrated by Miller, won the Children's Book Showcase award.

Sendak died on February 3, 1995, at the age of 71.

== Selected bibliography ==
- The Happy Rain (1956) (illustrated by Maurice Sendak)
- Circus Girl (1957) (illustrated by Maurice Sendak)
- The Second Witch (1965) (illustrations by Uri Shulevitz)
- The King of the Hermits and Other Stories (1966) (illustrated by Margot Zemach)
- Martze (1968) (illustrated by Mitchell Miller) ISBN 0374348510
- The Magic Tears (1971) (illustrated by Mitchell Miller)
