= The Wheel on the School =

1954 book by Meindert DeJong

- First edition
- Author: Meindert DeJong
- Illustrator: Maurice Sendak
- Language: English
- Genre: Children's novel
- Publisher: Harper & Brothers
- Publication date: 1954
- Publication place: United States
- Media type: Print (Hardback and paperback)
- Pages: 298 pp
- ISBN: 0064400212
- OCLC: 174138

The Wheel on the School is a children's novel by Dutch-born American author Meindert DeJong and illustrated by Maurice Sendak. In the Netherlands fishing village of Shora, storks, a symbol of good luck, never nest; six children set out to change that. The book won the 1955 Newbery Medal and the 1957 Germany Youth Literature Award.

== Plot summary ==
Lina is one of six school children in the small fishing village of Shora in Friesland. When she writes an essay for school that asks why there are no storks in their village, she sets all the others to wondering. Their teacher encourages the class to find out for themselves. The children set out to bring the storks back, but they have to overcome many obstacles. They discovered that the roofs on the village's homes are pitched so steeply that the storks cannot find space to nest on the sharp ridges, and placing a wagon wheel on each roof ridge would give storks a place to nest. The task of finding a wagon wheel in the tiny village proves difficult, and the children meet several interesting personalities during their search. This simple yet compelling plot teaches that when people think and wonder why, things begin to happen, and dreams come true.

The schoolchildren are: Lina, the only girl in the small school; Jella, the biggest of all the children; Auka, an average boy; Eelka, who is fat and awkward; and Pier and Dirk, the inseparable twins. These six kids are aided by their teacher, Grandmother Sibble III, legless Janus, old Douwa, and the "tin man". Other characters include the fathers of the children, who are all fishermen; Lina's aunt, who lives in Nes; Evert, the man living across from Lina's aunt; Lina and Auka's younger siblings, Linda and Jan; Jana, Janus's wife; and the mothers of the children.

Awards
| Preceded by …And Now Miguel | Newbery Medal recipient 1955 | Succeeded by Carry On, Mr. Bowditch |
