= Zlateh the Goat and Other Stories =

Children stories by Isaac Bashevis Singer

- First edition (publ. Harper & Row)
- Author: Isaac Bashevis Singer
- Illustrator: Maurice Sendak
- Publication date: October 11, 1966
- Awards: Newbery Honor (1967)

Zlateh the Goat and Other Stories is a 1966 book of short stories written by Polish-born Jewish-American author Isaac Bashevis Singer. The stories were translated from Yiddish, which was Singer's language of choice for writing, by Singer and Elizabeth Shub. Maurice Sendak provided illustrations for the book. Among other recognition the book received, it was a runner-up for the Newbery Medal (i.e., a Newbery Honor Book) in 1967. It was the first Sinnger's book written specifically for children, under Shub's advice. It has been translated into many languages.

== Contents ==
- Foreword
- Fool's Paradise
- Grandmother's Tale
- The Snow in Chelm
- The Mixed-up Feet and the Silly Bridegroom
- The First Shlemiel
- The Devil's Trick
- Zlateh the Goat

== "Zlateh the Goat" ==
The last short story in the book is set around Hanukkah time in an unnamed Jewish settlement in Poland. Reuven, a local furrier, is having trouble making money to provide his family with Hanukkah supplies and other necessities as the winter has been relatively mild and there has been little need for his services. Further complicating matters is the fact that the family's source of milk, their goat Zlateh, has grown old and is not as capable of producing milk as she used to be.

The town's butcher Feivel has decided to offer to buy Zlateh from Reuven for eight gulden, where he will slaughter her and sell her meat. After some debating and despite the objections of Reuven's wife Leah and his two daughters Anna and Miriam, he decides that the money that will come from the sale of the goat is more important to the family's well-being and sends his son, Aaron, to bring Zlateh into town. Zlateh does not suspect anything about being taken into town, as she has been remarkably well taken care of and has come to trust her owners, but is surprised when the reluctant Aaron (having to "obey his father") begins steering her toward town. On the way Zlateh suddenly wonders where Aaron is taking her when she passes new fields, pastures, and farms, but she soon tells herself that she is a goat that is not supposed to have any questions.

While on the way, the weather suddenly takes a turn for the worse and Aaron and Zlateh are caught in a hail storm. The conditions quickly grow worse and the boy and goat are trapped in a blizzard. Aaron gets lost as the snow covers his path and he quickly begins to look for shelter, with his life and Zlateh's now in severe danger. He finds a pile of hay in a field and digs out a shelter for himself and the goat, which is protected from the weather and is warm enough for both to survive. Aaron pokes a hole in the haystack to allow air to get into the makeshift shelter.

Unfortunately, the food Aaron was carrying with him when sent out runs out quickly and he is in danger of starving to death if he does not find sustenance. Luckily for him, Zlateh is able to produce milk by eating the hay and Aaron survives by drinking it. This process continues for three days, while the snow continues to fall around them. While trapped, Aaron and Zlateh develop a special sort of bond, where Aaron begins to view Zlateh not as simply his pet, but more "like a sister."

Meanwhile, word reaches the family that Aaron has gone missing and sends search parties out to find him. Reuven, Leah, and his sisters assume the worst- that he and Zlateh have frozen to death and that they will never see either of them again.

On the fourth day Aaron decides that he is not going to town to sell Zlateh and begins looking for a way home. He finds it when a passing peasant on his sleigh directs him toward the village. Aaron triumphantly returns home with Zlateh, and his family is elated to see them both. They decide not to sell Zlateh after hearing the story of how Aaron was kept alive by her milk and by snuggling with her, and decide to fix her a special treat to reward her.

Further, with the winter now in full swing Reuven's furrier business drastically improves as, with the cold weather, the villagers need to keep warm. This enables Reuven to make enough money to buy his family's necessities. Zlateh becomes an even more valuable member of the family, and always remembers the time she spent with Aaron in the haystack; she reminds him by simply bleating.

== Recognition ==
- Horn Book Fanfare list, 1967
- Deutscher Jugendliteraturpreis (German Youth Literature Prize, Children's Book category) for the German translation Zlateh, die Geiß und andere Geschichten, 1969
- School Library Journal "One Hundred Books that Shaped the Century," 2000

== Selected translations ==
- Une histoire de Paradis: et autre contes (French, 1966)
- Geden Zlateh og andre historier (Danish, 1967)
- Zlateh, die Geiss, und andere Geschichten (German, 1968)
- Zlateh la capra e altre storie (Italian, 1970)
- Zlateh la chèvre et autres contes (French, 1978, ISBN 2253023353)
- Hölmön paratiisi ja muita satuja (Finnish, 1979, ISBN 9513047857)
- Cuentos judios de la aldea de Chelm (Spanish, 1979)
- 山羊日拉德 / Shan yang Rilade (Chinese, 1989, ISBN 9579691053)
- Zlateh de geit en andere sprookjes (Dutch, 1989, ISBN 9062914985)
- Yagi to shōnen (Japanese, 1993, ISBN 4001157179)

== Adaptation ==
Zlateh the Goat was adapted into a short film by Gene Deitch for Weston Woods Studios. It was named to the ALA Notable Children's Films list in 1973.
