= In the Night Kitchen =

Children's picture book by Maurice Sendak

- Front cover, designed by Maurice Sendak
- Author: Maurice Sendak
- Illustrator: Maurice Sendak
- Cover artist: Sendak
- Language: English
- Genre: Children's literature
- Publisher: Harper & Row
- Publication date: September 18, 1970
- Publication place: United States
- Media type: Print
- Pages: 40
- ISBN: 978-0-0602-5489-6
- OCLC: 103953

In the Night Kitchen is a children's picture book written and illustrated by Maurice Sendak, first published in hardcover in 1970 by Harper and Row. The book depicts a young boy's dream journey through a surreal baker's kitchen where he assists in the creation of a cake to be ready by the morning.

In the Night Kitchen has been described by Sendak as part of a trilogy of books based on psychological development from In the Night Kitchen (toddler) to Where the Wild Things Are (pre-school) to Outside Over There (pre-adolescent). The book received a Caldecott Medal a year after its publication.

== Plot ==
While sleeping, a boy named Mickey is disturbed by noises on a lower floor. He then falls out of bed and into a surreal dreamscape known as the "Night Kitchen", landing in a giant bowl full of cake batter. Three bakers arrive and prepare the batter for baking, unaware (or unconcerned) that Mickey is inside. As they place the bowl in an oven, Mickey protests his inclusion in the recipe and jumps out.

Mickey builds an airplane out of bread dough and pilots it to the mouth of a giant milk bottle. He dives into the bottle and, using a measuring cup, pours milk into the bakers' batter, ensuring the cake is perfected. As dawn approaches, Mickey crows like a rooster and slides back into his bed. The book concludes with the words "and that's why, thanks to Mickey, we have cake every morning".

== Controversy ==
Since its initial release, In the Night Kitchen has been a significant source of controversy in the United States due to the fact that Mickey, the protagonist, is naked for much of the story. Some librarians and booksellers banned the book, while others censored the illustrations by drawing marker-pen shorts or taping paper diapers onto Mickey. The book has been ranked 25th on the "100 Most Frequently Challenged Books of 1990–2000" list compiled by the American Library Association.

== Style and themes ==
Sendak's illustrations here are rather different in style from Where the Wild Things Are, his best known book, which makes much use of cross hatching not found here. However, Sendak continues to utilize specific color tones and drawing a dream environment around a young child. Sendak's unique style captures the spirit and feeling of a dream, as Mickey floats, flies and dances from one panel to the next.

The book may be defined as a comic story, at least if one uses the definition of comics proposed in Scott McCloud's acclaimed Understanding Comics — the storytelling is mainly pictorial (albeit clarified by captions) and the images mainly sequential, and speech balloons are used throughout the entire book.

In fact, the imagery is very similar to Winsor McCay's Sunday comic strip series Little Nemo, from the early 20th century. Maurice Sendak has cited these comics as influential in his work, and on page five of Night Kitchen, one of the ingredients shown has a subtitle saying "Chicken Little, Nemo, mass", a nod to this influence.

In an interview on NPR's Fresh Air in 2006, Sendak said that his depiction of the cooks in In the Night Kitchen (with their Hitler-esque mustaches) and the fact that they tried to cook the boy in their ovens were references to the Holocaust, a subject high in his thoughts, especially due to his Jewish heritage. Sendak also said the story dealt with the things that happen after a child goes to bed.

== Awards received ==
Written in 1970, it has received the following awards:

- 1971 Caldecott Honor Book
- Notable Children's Books of 1940—1970 (ALA)
- Best Books of 1970 (SLJ)
- Outstanding Children's Books of 1970 (NYT)
- Best Illustrated Children's Books of 1970 (NYT)
- Children's Books of 1970 (Library of Congress)
- Carey-Thomas Award 1971—Honor Citation
- Brooklyn Art Books for Children 1973, 1975

== See also ==
- 1970 in literature
- Children's literature
- List of most commonly challenged books in the United States
