= Maurice Sendak =

American author and illustrator (1928–2012)

- Sendak in 2009
- Born: Maurice Bernard Sendak; June 10, 1928; Brooklyn, New York, U.S.
- Died: May 8, 2012 (aged 83); Danbury, Connecticut, U.S.
- Education: Art Students League of New York
- Occupations: Artist; Illustrator; Writer
- Partner: Eugene David Glynn (1957–2007; Glynn's death)
- Parents: Philip Sendak; Sadie Schindler
- Relatives: Jack Sendak (brother)
- Writing career
- Period: 1947–2012
- Genres: Children's literature; picture books

Maurice Bernard Sendak (/ˈsɛndæk/; June 10, 1928 – May 8, 2012) was an American author and illustrator of children's books. Born to Polish-Jewish parents, his childhood was impacted by the death of many of his family members during the Holocaust. Sendak illustrated his own books as well as those by other authors, such as the Little Bear series by Else Holmelund Minarik. He achieved acclaim with Where the Wild Things Are (1963), the first of a trilogy followed by In the Night Kitchen (1970) and Outside Over There (1981). He also designed sets for operas, notably Mozart's The Magic Flute.

In 1987, Sendak was the subject of an American Masters documentary, "Mon Cher Papa". In 1996, he received the National Medal of Arts. Per Margalit Fox, Sendak, "the most important children's book artist of the 20th century", "wrenched the picture book out of the safe, sanitized world of the nursery and plunged it into the dark, terrifying and hauntingly beautiful recesses of the human psyche." His career was chronicled in Lance Bangs's Tell Them Anything You Want: A Portrait of Maurice Sendak (2009).

== Early life ==
Sendak was born on June 10, 1928, in Brooklyn, New York, to Polish-Jewish immigrants Sadie (née Schindler) and Philip Sendak, a dressmaker. Maurice said that his childhood was a "terrible situation" due to the death of members of his extended family during the Holocaust which introduced him at a young age to the concept of mortality. His love of books began when, as a child, he developed health issues and was confined to his bed. He was "enthralled by Mickey Mouse (who was created the year of his birth), by American comics, and by the bright lights of Manhattan." When he was 12 years old, he decided to become an illustrator after watching Walt Disney's Fantasia (1940).

Maurice was the youngest of three siblings, born five years after Jack Sendak and nine years after Natalie Sendak. Jack also became an author of children's books, two of which were illustrated by Maurice in the 1950s. In 2011, Maurice was working on a book about noses, and he attributed his love of the olfactory organ to his brother Jack, who, in Sendak's opinion, had a great nose.

At the New York Art Students League, he took a class from John Groth, who taught him "a sense of the enormous potential for motion, for aliveness in illustration […] He himself […] showed how much fun creating in it could be."

== Career ==
The characters from Where the Wild Things Are caused controversy due to their grotesque appearance which parents alleged to be too scary for children.

=== Author and illustrator ===
Maurice Sendak began his professional career in 1947 with illustrations for a popular science book, Atomics For the Millions. One of Sendak's first professional commissions, when he was 20 years old, was creating window displays for the toy store FAO Schwarz. The store's children's book buyer introduced him to Ursula Nordstrom, children's book editor at Harper & Row, who would go on to edit E. B. White's Charlotte's Web (1952) and Louise Fitzhugh's Harriet the Spy (1964). This led to his first illustrations for a children's book, for Marcel Aymé's The Wonderful Farm (1951). His work appears in eight books by Ruth Krauss, including A Hole Is to Dig (1952), which brought wide attention to his artwork. He illustrated the first five books in Else Holmelund Minarik's Little Bear series. The Maurice Sendak Foundation cites Krauss, Nordstrom and Crockett Johnson as mentors to Sendak. He made his solo debut with Kenny's Window (1956). He published the Nutshell Library (1962), consisting of Alligators All Around, One Was Johnny, Pierre and Chicken Soup With Rice. Sendak said of Nordstrom: "She treated me like a hothouse flower, watered me for ten years, and hand-picked the works that were to become my permanent backlist and bread-and-butter support."

Sendak gained international acclaim after writing and illustrating Where the Wild Things Are (1963), edited by Nordstrom. It features Max, a boy who "rages against his mother for being sent to bed without any supper". The book's depictions of fanged monsters concerned some parents when it was first published, as his characters were somewhat grotesque in appearance. Sendak explained that the title came from the Yiddish phrase vilde chaya, or "wild beast": "It's what almost every Jewish mother or father says to their offspring, 'You're acting like a vilde chaya! Stop it!'" It won the Caldecott Medal, considered the highest honor for picture books in the United states. Humphrey Carpenter and Mari Prichard write that "it is generally considered unequaled in its exploration of a child's fantasy world and its relation to real life." It was adapted into an opera by Oliver Knussen and a film by Spike Jonze.

Sendak later recounted the reaction of a fan:

A little boy sent me a charming card with a little drawing on it. I loved it. I answer all my children's letters–sometimes very hastily–but this one I lingered over. I sent him a card and I drew a picture of a Wild Thing on it. I wrote, "Dear Jim: I loved your card." Then I got a letter back from his mother and she said: "Jim loved your card so much he ate it." That to me was one of the highest compliments I've ever received. He didn't care that it was an original Maurice Sendak drawing or anything. He saw it, he loved it, he ate it.

Sendak illustrated The Bat Poet (1964), a children's book by Randall Jarrell. When Sendak saw a manuscript of Zlateh the Goat and Other Stories, the first children's book by Isaac Bashevis Singer, on the desk of an editor at Harper & Row, he offered to illustrate it. It was first published in 1966 and received a Newbery Honor. Sendak was enthusiastic about the collaboration. He once wryly remarked that his parents were "finally" impressed by their youngest child when he collaborated with Singer.

Higglety Pigglety Pop! or There Must Be More To Life (1967), inspired by Sendak's dog, Jennie, was his favorite of his books. He called it "my requiem for [Jennie]—an unsentimental, even comic requiem to a shrewd, stubborn, loyal, and lovable creature whose all consuming passion was food."

In the Night Kitchen (1970) is "a further exploration of a boy's fantasy world, this time closely based on Sendak's childhood memories of New York life." Fox writes "the huge, flat, brightly colored illustrations" are "a tribute to the New York of Mr. Sendak's childhood, recalling the 1930s films and comic books he adored all his life." Sendak explained: "It was an homage to everything I loved: New York, immigrants, Jews, Laurel and Hardy, Mickey Mouse, King Kong, movies. I just jammed them into one cuckoo book." It has often been censored for its drawings of a young boy prancing naked through the story. The book has been challenged in several U.S. states including Illinois, New Jersey, Minnesota, and Texas. In the Night Kitchen regularly appears on the American Library Association's list of "frequently challenged and banned books". It was listed number 21 on the "100 Most Frequently Challenged Books of 1990–1999".

Outside Over There (1981) the story of a girl named Ida and her sibling jealousy and responsibility. Her father is away, so Ida is left to watch her baby sister, much to her dismay. Her sister is kidnapped by goblins and Ida must go off on a magical adventure to rescue her. At first, she is not really eager to get her sister and nearly passes right by her when she becomes absorbed in the magic of the quest. In the end, she rescues her sister, destroys the goblins, and returns home committed to caring for her sister until her father returns. This rescue story includes an illustration of a ladder leaning out of the window of a home, which according to one report, was based on the crime scene in the Lindbergh kidnapping, "which terrified Sendak as a child." Carpenter and Prichard write, "More dark in subject matter than Where the Wild Things Are and In the Night Kitchen, it was published on both adult and children's book lists, and showed a marked change in illustrative style, entirely away from the comic-strip manner that was always partly apparent in the other two." Sendak included a cameo from one of his favorite composers, Wolfgang Amadeus Mozart. A collection of his essays and lectures were published as Caldecott & Co.: Notes on Books and Pictures (1988).

In 1993, Sendak published We Are All in the Dumps with Jack and Guy, about the AIDS crisis. Later in the 1990s, Sendak approached playwright Tony Kushner to write a new English-language version of the Czech composer Hans Krása's Holocaust opera Brundibár which, remarkably, had been performed by children in the Theresienstadt concentration camp. Kushner wrote the text for Sendak's illustrated book of the same name, published in 2003. The book was named one of The New York Times Book Review's 10 Best Illustrated Books of 2003. Gregory Maguire wrote: "In a career that spans 50 years and counting, as Sendak's does, there are bound to be lesser works. Brundibar is not lesser than anything."

In 2011, Sendak adapted his Sesame Street short Bumble Ardy into a children's book, his first in over thirty years, and ultimately his last published work before his death. My Brother's Book (2013) was published posthumously. Dwight Garner wrote "Its charms are simmering and reflective ones. This moral fable may find its largest audience among adults."

=== Other projects ===
Sendak was an early member of the National Board of Advisors of the Children's Television Workshop during the development stages of the Sesame Street television series. He created two animated stories for the series: Bumble Ardy, an animated sequence with Jim Henson as the voice of Bumble Ardy, and Seven Monsters. Sendak later adapted Seven Monsters into the book Seven Little Monsters, which itself would be adapted into an animated television series.

Sendak wrote an animated musical, Really Rosie, featuring the voice of Carole King and broadcast in 1975. It is available on video (usually as part of video compilations of his work). An album of the songs was also produced. He contributed the opening segment to Simple Gifts, a Christmas collection of six animated shorts shown on PBS in 1977 and later released on VHS in 1993. He adapted Where the Wild Things Are for the stage in 1979. Additionally, he designed sets and costumes for many operas and ballets, including the award-winning Pacific Northwest Ballet 1983 production of Tchaikovsky's The Nutcracker, Glyndebourne Festival Opera's productions of Prokofiev's The Love for Three Oranges (1982), Ravel's L'enfant et les sortilèges and L'heure espagnole (1987) and Knussen's adaptation of Sendak's own Higglety Pigglety Pop! or There Must Be More to Life (1985), Houston Grand Opera's productions of Mozart's The Magic Flute (1981) and Humperdinck's Hansel and Gretel (1997), Los Angeles County Music Center's 1990 production of Mozart's Idomeneo, New York City Opera's production of Janáček's The Cunning Little Vixen (1981) and the Lyric Opera of Kansas City's production of Mozart's The Goose of Cairo (1982).

In 2003, Chicago Opera Theatre produced Sendak and Kushner's adaptation of Brundibár. In 2005, Berkeley Repertory Theatre, in collaboration with Yale Repertory Theatre and Broadway's New Victory Theater, produced a substantially re-worked version of the Sendak-Kushner adaptation. In 2004, Sendak worked with the Shirim Klezmer Orchestra in Boston on their project Pincus and the Pig: A Klezmer Tale. This Klezmer version of Prokofiev's best-known musical story for children, Peter and the Wolf, featured Maurice Sendak as the narrator. He also illustrated the cover art.

Margalit Fox writes that "His art graced the writing of other eminent authors for children and adults, including Hans Christian Andersen, Leo Tolstoy, Herman Melville, William Blake and Isaac Bashevis Singer."

== Personal life ==
Sendak mentioned in a September 2008 article in The New York Times that he was gay and had lived with his partner, psychoanalyst Eugene David Glynn (February 25, 1926 – May 15, 2007), for 50 years before Glynn's death in May 2007. Revealing that he never told his parents, he said, "All I wanted was to be straight so my parents could be happy. They never, never, never knew." Sendak's relationship with Glynn was referenced by other writers before (including Tony Kushner in 2003) and Glynn's 2007 death notice identified Sendak as his "partner of fifty years". After his partner's death, Sendak donated $1 million to the Jewish Board of Family and Children's Services in memory of Glynn, who treated young people there. The money will go to a clinic which is to be named for Glynn.

Sendak was an atheist. In a 2011 interview, he said that he did not believe in God and explained that he felt that religion, and belief in God, "must have made life much easier [for some religious friends of his]. It's harder for us non-believers."

In the early 1960s, Sendak lived in a basement apartment at 29 West 9th Street in Greenwich Village where he wrote and illustrated Wild Things. Later he had a nearby pied-à-terre at 40 Fifth Avenue where he worked and stayed occasionally after moving full-time to Ridgefield, Connecticut.

He said: "I don't really believe that the kid I was has grown up into me. He still exists somewhere in the most graphic, plastic, physical way for me. I have tremendous concern for, and interest in, him. I try to communicate with him all the time. One of my worst fears is losing contact."

=== Influences ===
Maurice Sendak drew inspiration and influences from a vast number of painters, musicians, and authors. Going back to his childhood, one of his earliest memorable influences was actually his father, Philip Sendak. According to Maurice, his father related tales from the Torah; however, he would embellish them with racy details. Not realizing that this was inappropriate for children, young Maurice was frequently sent home after retelling his father's "softcore Bible tales" at school. Gregory Maguire says Sendak "felt he was relative to people like Emily Dickinson and Keats and Henry James and Homer." Margalit Fox wrote: "A largely self-taught illustrator, Mr. Sendak was at his finest a shtetl Blake, portraying a luminous world, at once lovely and dreadful, suspended between wakefulness and dreaming. In so doing, he was able to convey both the propulsive abandon and the pervasive melancholy of children's interior lives. ... His visual style could range from intricately crosshatched scenes that recalled 19th-century prints to airy watercolors reminiscent of Chagall to bold, bulbous figures inspired by the comic books he loved all his life, with outsize feet that the page could scarcely contain. He never did learn to draw feet, he often said."

Sendak had other influences growing up, including Walt Disney's Fantasia and Mickey Mouse. Mickey Mouse was created in the year Sendak was born, 1928, and Sendak described Mickey as being a source of joy and pleasure for him while growing up. He has been quoted as saying, "My gods are Herman Melville, Emily Dickinson, Mozart. I believe in them with all my heart." Of Dickinson, he said: "I have a little tiny Emily Dickinson so big that I carry in my pocket everywhere. And you just read three poems of Emily. She is so brave. She is so strong. She is such a passionate little woman. I feel better." Of Mozart, he said, "When Mozart is playing in my room, I am in conjunction with something I can't explain. ... I don't need to. I know that if there's a purpose for life, it was for me to hear Mozart."

=== Death and tributes ===
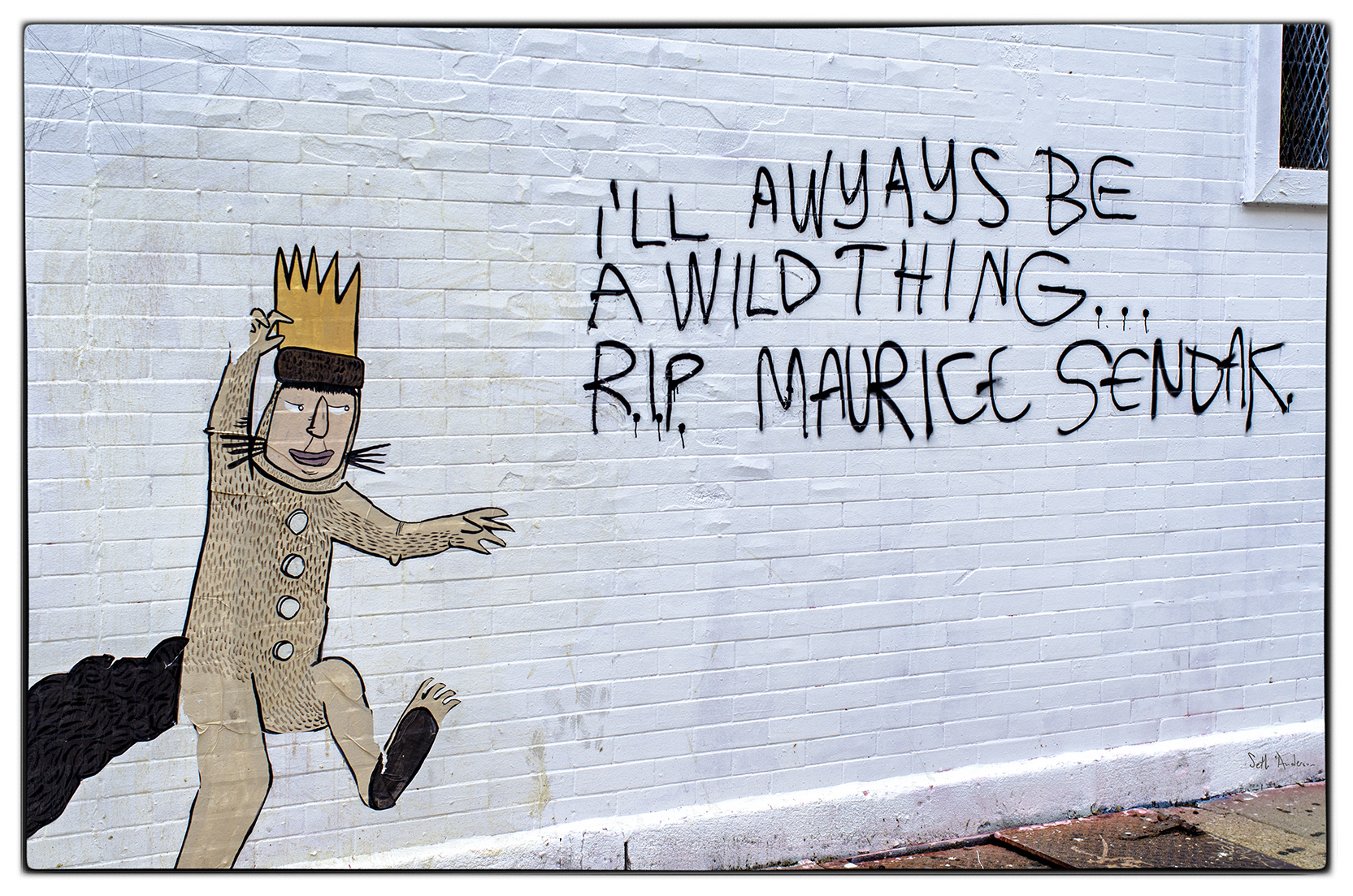
A mural in Wicker Park, Chicago, alludes to Sendak's passing.

Sendak died at Danbury Hospital in Danbury, Connecticut on May 8, 2012, at age 83, due to complications from a stroke. In accordance with his wishes, his body was cremated and his ashes were scattered at an undisclosed location. Spike Jonze recalled "I would look at those pictures—where Max's bedroom turns into a forest—and there was something that felt like magic there." Jonze directed the film adaptation Where the Wild Things Are and the documentary Tell Them Anything You Want: A Portrait of Maurice Sendak (both 2009). Author R. L. Stine called Sendak's death "a sad day in children's books and for the world." Tom Hanks said "Maurice Sendak helped raise my kids—all four of them heard 'The night Max wore his wolf suit...' many times."

Stephen Colbert, who interviewed Sendak in one of his last public appearances, said of Sendak: "We are all honored to have been briefly invited into his world." On a January 2012 episode of The Colbert Report, Sendak taught Colbert how to illustrate and provided a book blurb for Colbert's spoof children's book, I Am a Pole (And So Can You!) The book was published on the day of Sendak's death with his blurb: "The sad thing is, I like it!"

The 2012 season of Pacific Northwest Ballet's The Nutcracker, for which Sendak designed the set and costumes, was dedicated to his memory.

His final book, Bumble-Ardy, was published eight months before his death. A posthumous picture book, My Brother's Book, was published in February 2013. (2009). Jonze's film Her was dedicated in memory of Sendak and Where the Wild Things Are co-star James Gandolfini. Richard Robinson, executive of Scholastic Corporation, said "Maurice Sendak captured childhood in brilliant stories and drawings that will live forever." Gregory Maguire, author of Making Mischief: A Maurice Sendak Appreciation wrote that Sendak realized "Children are full humans, compromised only by their lack of vocabulary and practice in reporting how they live. But they live as fully as Sendak himself lived right up to his last months and weeks and hours. ... [S]ome more sentimental scrap of me (that he would have scorned) hopes he is settling down to some nice bowl of chicken soup with rice with Emily Dickinson or Herman Melville. Though they have been impatient to meet him in person for a very long time, no doubt they'll greet him as a fellow king. By now, Sendak is finding his dinner waiting for him. And it is still hot."

== Awards and honors ==
In 2012, School Library Journal named Where the Wild Things Are as its top picture book based on reader surveys. The librarian who conducted it observed that there was little doubt what would be voted number one and highlighted its designation by one reader as a watershed, "ushering in the modern age of picture books". Another called it "perfectly crafted, perfectly illustrated ... simply the epitome of a picture book" and noted that Sendak "rises above the rest in part because he is subversive." Sendak received the third biennial Hans Christian Andersen Award for Illustration in 1970, recognizing his "lasting contribution to children's literature". He received one of two inaugural Astrid Lindgren Memorial Awards in 2003, recognizing his career contribution to "children's and young adult literature in the broadest sense". The citation called him "the modern picture-book's portal figure" and the presentation credited Where the Wild Things Are with "all at once [revolutionizing] the entire picture-book narrative ... thematically, aesthetically, and psychologically." In the U.S., he received the Laura Ingalls Wilder Medal from the professional children's librarians in 1983, recognizing his "substantial and lasting contributions to children's literature". At the time it was awarded every three years. Only Sendak and the writer Katherine Paterson have won all three of these premier awards.

- Caldecott Medal from the ALA as illustrator of "the most distinguished American picture book for children", Where the Wild Things Are, 1964 (Sendak was one of the Caldecott runners-up seven times from 1954 to 1982, more than any other illustrator, although some won multiple medals)
- The House of Sixty Fathers, a novel by Meindert DeJong, for which Sendak provided the spot, black-and-white illustrations, won the Child Study Association of America's Children's Book Award (now called the Josette Frank Award), 1956
- Hans Christian Andersen Award for children's book illustration, 1970
- National Book Award in category Picture Books for Outside Over There, 1982
- Laura Ingalls Wilder Medal for American children's literature, 1983
- National Medal of Arts, 1996
- Astrid Lindgren Memorial Award for children's literature, 2003
- Honorary doctorate from the University of Connecticut, 1990
- Honorary doctorate from Goucher College, 2004
- Inducted into the New York Writers Hall of Fame in 2013

Sendak has two elementary schools named in his honor, one in North Hollywood, California, and PS 118 in Brooklyn, New York. He received an honorary doctorate from Princeton University in 1984.

On June 10, 2013, Google featured an interactive doodle where visitors could click on the video go triangle to see an animated movie-ette of Max and Sendak's other main characters. On the cusp of the 125th anniversary of the Brooklyn Public Library it was revealed on November 16, 2022 that the most checked-out book in the collection was Sendak's Where the Wild Things Are.

== Selected works ==
=== Author and illustrator ===
- Kenny's Window (1956)
- The Sign on Rosie's Door (1960)
- The Nutshell Library (1962)
- Where the Wild Things Are (1963)
- Higglety Pigglety Pop! or There Must Be More to Life (1967) ISBN 0-06-028479-X
- In the Night Kitchen (1970)
- Some Swell Pup or Are You Sure You Want a Dog? (written by Maurice Sendak and Matthew Margolis, and illustrated by Sendak) (1976)
- Seven Little Monsters (1977)
- Outside Over There (1981)
- Caldecott & Co: Notes on Books and Pictures (an anthology of essays on children's literature) (1988)
- The Big Book for Peace (1990)
- Maurice Sendak's Christmas Mystery (1995) (a box containing a book and a jigsaw puzzle)
- Bumble-Ardy (2011) ISBN 0-06-205198-9, ISBN 978-0-06-205198-1
- My Brother's Book (2013) ISBN 0-06-223489-7, ISBN 978-0-06-223489-6
- Ten Little Rabbits (2025, published posthumously) ISBN 978-0-241-68865-6

=== Illustrator only ===
- Atomics for the Millions (by Maxwell Leigh Eidinoff, 1947)
- The Wonderful Farm (by Marcel Aymé, 1951)
- Good Shabbos Everybody (by Robert Garvey, 1951)
- A Hole Is to Dig (by Ruth Krauss, 1952)
- Maggie Rose: Her Birthday Christmas (by Ruth Sawyer, 1952)
- A Very Special House (by Ruth Krauss, 1953)
- Hurry Home, Candy (by Meindert DeJong, 1953)
- The Giant Story (by Beatrice Schenk de Regniers, 1953)
- Shadrach (by Meindert Dejong, 1953)
- I'll Be You and You Be Me (by Ruth Krauss, 1954)
- The Tin Fiddle (by Edward Tripp, 1954)
- The Wheel on the School (by Meindert DeJong, 1954)
- Mrs. Piggle-Wiggle's Farm (by Betty MacDonald, 1954)
- Charlotte and the White Horse (by Ruth Krauss, 1955)
- Happy Hanukah Everybody (by Hyman Chanover and Alice Chanover, 1955)
- Little Cow & the Turtle (by Meindert DeJong, 1955)
- Singing Family of the Cumberlands (by Jean Ritchie, 1955)
- What Can You Do with a Shoe? (by Beatrice Schenk de Regniers, 1955, re-colored 1997)
- Seven Little Stories on Big Subjects (by Gladys Baker Bond, 1955)
- I Want to Paint My Bathroom Blue (by Ruth Krauss, 1956)
- The House of Sixty Fathers (by Meindert De Jong, 1956)
- The Birthday Party (by Ruth Krauss, 1957)
- You Can't Get There From Here (by Ogden Nash, 1957)
- Little Bear series (by Else Holmelund Minarik)
- Circus Girl (by Jack Sendak, 1957)
- Along Came a Dog (by Meindert DeJong, 1958)
- No Fighting, No Biting! (by Else Holmelund Minarik, 1958)
- What Do You Say, Dear? (by Sesyle Joslin, 1958)
- Seven Tales by H. C. Andersen (translated by Eva Le Gallienne, 1959)
- The Moon Jumpers (by Janice May Udry, 1959)
- Open House for Butterflies (by Ruth Krauss, 1960)
- Windy Wash Day and Other Poems (by Dorothy Aldis, from Best in Children's Books: Volume 31, 1960)
- Dwarf Long-Nose (by Wilhelm Hauff, translated by Doris Orgel, 1960)
- The Velveteen Rabbit (by Margery Williams, from Best in Children's Books: Volume 35, 1960)
- What the Good-Man Does Is Always Right (by Hans Christian Andersen from Best in Children's Books: Volume 41, 1961)
- Let's Be Enemies (by Janice May Udry, 1961)
- The Big Green Book (by Robert Graves, 1962)
- Mr. Rabbit and the Lovely Present (by Charlotte Zolotow, 1962)
- The Singing Hill (by Meindert DeJong, 1962)
- The Griffin and the Minor Canon (by Frank R. Stockton, 1963)
- How Little Lori Visited Times Square (by Amos Vogel, 1963)
- She Loves Me ... She Loves Me Not ... (by Robert Keeshan, 1963)
- Nikolenka's Childhood: An Edition for Young Readers (by Leo Tolstoy, 1963)
- McCall's: August 1964, VOL. XCI, No. 11 (featuring The Young Crane by Andrejs Upits, illustrations by Maurice Sendak, 1964)
- The Bee-Man of Orn (by Frank R. Stockton, 1964)
- The Animal Family (by Randall Jarrell, 1965)
- Let's Be Enemies (written by Janice May Udry) (1965)
- Hector Protector and As I Went Over the Water: Two Nursery Rhymes (traditional nursery rhymes, 1965)
- Lullabyes and Night Songs (by Alec Wilder, 1965)
- Zlateh the Goat and Other Stories (by Isaac Bashevis Singer, 1966)
- The Golden Key (by George MacDonald, 1967)
- The Bat-Poet (by Randall Jarrell, 1967)
- The Saturday Evening Post: May 4, 1968, 241st year, Issue no. 9 (features Yash The Chimney Sweep by Isaac Bashevis Singer, 1968)
- The Light Princess (by George MacDonald, 1969)
- The Juniper Tree and Other Tales from Grimm: Volumes 1 & 2 (translated by Lore Segal with four tales translated by Randall Jarrell, 1973 both volumes)
- King Grisly-Beard (by the Brothers Grimm, 1973)
- Pleasant Fieldmouse (by Jan Wahl, 1975)
- Fly by Night (by Randall Jarrell, 1976)
- The Big Green Book (by Robert Graves, 1978)
- Singing family of the Cumberlands (by Jean Richie, 1980)
- Nutcracker (by E.T.A. Hoffmann, 1984)
- In Grandpa's House (by Philip Sendak, 1985)
- The Mother Goose Collection (by Charles Perrault with various illustrators, 1985)
- Dear Mili (written by Wilhelm Grimm, 1988)
- Sing a Song of Popcorn: Every Child's Book of Poems (by Beatrice Schenk de Regniers with various illustrators including Maurice Sendak, 1988)
- The Big Book for Peace (various authors and illustrators, cover also by Maurice Sendak, 1990)
- I Saw Esau (edited by Iona Opie and Peter Opie, 1992)
- The Golden Key (by George MacDonald, 1992)
- We Are All in the Dumps with Jack and Guy: Two Nursery Rhymes with Pictures (traditional nursery rhymes, 1993)
- Pierre, or The Ambiguities: The Kraken Edition (by Herman Melville, 1995)
- The Miami Giant (by Arthur Yorinks, 1995)
- Frank and Joey Eat Lunch (by Arthur Yorinks, 1996)
- Frank and Joey Go to Work (by Arthur Yorinks, 1996)
- Penthesilea (by Heinrich von Kleist, 1998)
- Dear Genius: The Letters of Ursula Nordstrom (by Ursula Nordstrom, 1998)
- Swine Lake (by James Marshall, 1999)
- Brundibár (by Tony Kushner, 2003)
- Sarah's Room (by Doris Orgel, 2003)
- The Happy Rain (by Jack Sendak, 2004)
- Pincus and the Pig: A Klezmer Tale (performed by the Shirim Klezmer Orchestra and narrated by Maurice Sendak, 2004)
- Bears! (by Ruth Krauss, 2005)
- Mommy? (by Arthur Yorinks, paper engineering by Matthew Reinhert; Maurice Sendak's only pop-up book, 2006)
- Presto and Zesto in Limboland (by Arthur Yorinks and Maurice Sendak, released posthumously, September 4, 2018)
- Hansel and Gretel (by Stephen King and Maurice Sendak, released posthumously, September 2, 2025) ISBN 9780062644695 (US), ISBN 9781444919349 (UK))

- The illustrations by Sendak were the set and costume designs which he had created for his 1998 production of Engelbert Humperdinck's opera Hänsel und Gretel.

=== Music ===
- Mahler – Symphony No. 3, James Levine conducting the Chicago Symphony Orchestra – album cover artwork "What The Night Tells Me", 1976
- The Love for Three Oranges (The Glyndebourne version, by Frank Corsaro, based on L'Amour des Trois Oranges by Serge Prokofiev, 1984)
- The Cunning Little Vixen (by Rudolf Tesnohlidek, 1985)

== Filmography ==
- 1973: Where the Wild Things Are (animated short direct by Gene Deitch, music and narration by Peter Schickele)
- 1975: Really Rosie (director, writer, and story artist)
- 1985: Return to Oz (directed by Walter Murch, preliminary artwork)
- 1986: Sendak (non-story featurette)
- 1987: In the Night Kitchen (Animated short direct by Gene Deitch, narration by Peter Schickele)
- 1995-2001: Little Bear (Based-book co-creator, producer)
- 2000-2003: Seven Little Monsters (Based-book creator, producer)
- 2001: The Little Bear Movie (producer)
- 2002: Last Dance (directed by Mirra Bank)
- 2009: Where the Wild Things Are (producer, story)
- 2009: Tell Them Anything You Want: A Portrait of Maurice Sendak, documentary Lance Bangs and Where the Wild Things Are director Spike Jonze. Released in the US on DVD by Oscilloscope Laboratories.
- 2010: Higglety Pigglety Pop! or There Must Be More to Life (story), an animated/live action short adapted and directed by Chris Lavis and Maciek Szczerbowski (The Clyde Henry Company), co-produced by Spike Jonze, Vincent Landay, and Marcy Page (National Film Board of Canada)

== Selected exhibitions ==
- October 13, 2024 – February 17, 2025. Wild Things: The Art of Maurice Sendak at the Denver Art Museum
- April 18 – September 1, 2024. Wild Things Are Happening: The Art of Maurice Sendak at the Skirball Cultural Center in Los Angeles
- March 25, 2021 – July 10, 2021. Maurice Sendak Exhibit and Sale at the Society of Illustrators in New York
- June 11, 2013 – August 17, 2013. "Maurice Sendak: A Celebration of the Artist and his Work" at the Society of Illustrators in New York
- Permanent. Maurice Sendak Collection at The Rosenbach Museum & Library in Philadelphia
- 2013–"Maurice Sendak; The Memorial Exhibition." April 2013 "Bowers Museum of California" "The New Britain Museum of American Art'"
- September 8, 2009 – January 19, 2010.There's a Mystery There: Sendak on Sendak at The Contemporary Jewish Museum in San Francisco
- October 6, 2009 – November 1, 2009. Where the Wild Things Are: Original Drawings by Maurice Sendak at The Morgan Library & Museum in New York
- October 1–30, 2009 "Sendak in SoHo" at AFA Gallery in New York
- April 15, 2005 – August 14, 2005. Wild Things: The Art of Maurice Sendak at The Jewish Museum in New York
