= Janice May Udry =

American writer (1928–2023)

Janice May Udry (June 14, 1928 – May 12, 2023) was an American author of children's literature, primarily of picture books.

== Life and career ==
Janice May was born in Jacksonville, Illinois on June 14, 1928. She graduated from Northwestern University in 1950. Her first widely-published book, A Tree is Nice, was awarded the Caldecott Medal in 1957 for Marc Simont's illustrations. She was a member of the American Association of University Women and her papers are held at the University of Southern Mississippi.

In 1950, she married Richard Udry. They have two children, Leslie and Susan. Richard died in 2012, at the age of 83. Janice May Udry died on May 12, 2023, at the age of 94.

== Bibliography ==
- Little Bear and the Beautiful Kite (1955), illus. Hertha Depper, Albert Whitman
- A Tree Is Nice (1956), illus. Marc Simont, Harper – Winner of the Caldecott Medal
- Theodore's Parents (1958), illus. Adrienne Adams, Lothrop
- The Moon Jumpers (1959), illus. Maurice Sendak, Harper - Caldecott Honor
- Danny's Pig (1960), illus. Mariana [sic], Lothrop
- Alfred (1960), illus. Judith S. Roth, Albert Whitman
- Let's Be Enemies (1961), illus. Maurice Sendak, Harper
- Is Susan Here? (1962), illus. Peter Edwards, Abelard, re-illus. 1993 by Karen Gundersheimer
- The Mean Mouse and Other Mean Stories (1962), illus. Ed Young, Harper
- End of the Line (1962), illus. Hope Taylor, Albert Whitman
- Betsy-Back-in-Bed (1963), illus. Hope Taylor, Albert Whitman
- Next Door to Laura Linda (1965), illus. Meg Wohlberg, Albert Whitman
- What Mary Jo Shared (1966), illus. Elizabeth Sayles, Albert Whitman
- If You're a Bear (1967), illus. Erica Merkling, Albert Whitman
- Mary Ann's Mud Day (1967), illus. Martha Alexander, Harper
- What Mary Jo Wanted (1968), illus. Eleanor Mill, Albert Whitman
- Glenda (1969), illus. Marc Simont, Harper
- The Sunflower Garden (1969), illus. Beatrice Darwin, Harvey House
- Emily's Autumn (1969), illus. Erik Blegvad, Albert Whitman
- Mary Jo's Grandmother (1970), illus. Eleanor Mill, Albert Whitman
- Angie (1971), illus. Hilary Knight, Harper
- How I Faded Away (1975), illus. Monica De Bruyn, Albert Whitman
- Oh No, Cat! (1976), illus. Mary Chalmers, Coward
- Thump and Plunk (1981), illus. Ann Schweninger, published with new illustrations by Geoffrey Hayes (2000), Harper
- Glenda Glinka, Witch-at-Large (1997), illus. Marc Simont, HarperTrophy
