= Where the Wild Things Are =

1963 children's picture book by Maurice Sendak

- First edition cover
- Author: Maurice Sendak
- Illustrator: Maurice Sendak
- Cover artist: Maurice Sendak
- Language: English
- Genre: Children's picture book
- Publisher: Harper & Row
- Publication date: November 13, 1963
- Publication place: United States
- Media type: Print (wide-format hardcover)
- Pages: 40
- ISBN: 0-06-025492-0 (25th anniversary ed., 1988)
- OCLC: 225496
- LC Class: PZ7.S47 Wh

Where the Wild Things Are is a 1963 children's picture book written and illustrated by American author and illustrator Maurice Sendak, originally published in hardcover by Harper & Row. The story follows Max, a mischievous boy in a wolf suit who causes havoc at home and is sent to his room without supper, where his imagination transforms the room into a jungle and carries him across the sea to an island inhabited by large, monstrous creatures called Wild Things.

The book received the Caldecott Medal in 1964, with librarians recognizing Where the Wild Things Are as the previous year's "most distinguished American picture book for children". It was voted the number one picture book in a 2012 survey of School Library Journal readers, not for the first time. The book has been adapted into other media several times, including an animated short film in 1973 (with an updated version in 1988); a 1980 opera; and a live-action 2009 feature-film adaptation. The book had sold over 19 million copies worldwide as of 2009, with 10 million of those being in the United States.

== Plot ==
The story focuses on a young boy named Max who, after dressing in his wolf suit, wreaks such havoc through his household that he is sent to bed without his supper as punishment. Max's bedroom transforms into a jungle environment, and he sails to an island inhabited by monsters called the Wild Things. The Wild Things try to scare Max, but it is to no avail. After stopping and intimidating the creatures, Max is hailed as the king of the Wild Things and enjoys a playful rumpus with his subjects. Finally, Max stops them and sends them to bed without their supper. However, to the Wild Things' dismay, he starts to feel lonely and decides to abdicate and return home. The creatures do not want Max to go, and they throw themselves into fits of rage as he calmly sails home. Upon returning to his bedroom, Max discovers a hot supper waiting for him.

== Development ==
Sendak began his career as an illustrator, but by the mid-1950s, Sendak had started writing and illustrating his own books. In 1956, he published his first book for which he was the sole author, Kenny's Window (1956). Soon after, Sendak began work on another solo effort. The story was supposed to be that of a child who, after a tantrum, is punished in his room and decides to escape to the place that gives the book its title, the "land of wild horses". Shortly before starting the illustrations, Sendak realized that he did not know how to draw horses and, at the suggestion of his editor, changed the wild horses to the more ambiguous "Wild Things", a term inspired by the Yiddish expression "vilde chaya" ("wild animals"), used to indicate boisterous children.

Sendak replaced the horses with caricatures of his aunts and uncles, caricatures that he had originally drawn in his youth as an escape from their chaotic, weekly visits to his family's Brooklyn home. Sendak, as a child, had observed his relatives as being "all crazy – crazy faces and wild eyes", with blood-stained eyes and "big and yellow" teeth, who pinched his cheeks until they were red. These relatives, like Sendak's parents, were poor Jewish immigrants from Poland, whose remaining family in Nazi-occupied Europe were killed during the Holocaust while Sendak was in his early teens. As a child, he saw them as "grotesques".

When working on the 1983 opera adaptation of the book with Oliver Knussen, Sendak gave the monsters the names of his relatives: Tzippy, Moishe, Aaron, Emile, and Bernard.

== Literary significance ==
=== Analysis ===
In Selma G. Lanes's book The Art of Maurice Sendak, Sendak discusses Where the Wild Things Are along with his other books In the Night Kitchen and Outside Over There as a trilogy centered on children's growth, survival, and fury. He indicated that the three books are "all variations on the same theme: how children master various feelings – danger, boredom, fear, frustration, jealousy – and manage to come to grips with the realities of their lives". Critics have noted that Sendak uses the book's physical form as a storytelling device, with Max's imagined world expanding from a small picture book to a wide landscape that stretches beyond the edges of the page. Fundamental to Sendak's work for over fifty years is his trust in the validity of children's emotions.

Dr. Kara Keeling and Dr. Scott Pollard, both English professors, assess the role that food plays in the book, arguing that food is a metaphor for Max's mother's love based on the idea that Max comes home to a "still hot" supper, which suggests that his mother "loves him best". Going along with this, Mary Pols of Time magazine wrote that "[w]hat makes Sendak's book so compelling is its grounding effect: Max has a tantrum and in a flight of fancy visits his wild side, but he is pulled back by a belief in parental love to a supper 'still hot', balancing the seesaw of fear and comfort".

Where the Wild Things Are is a story that shows children's resilience through their "spirit" and "pluck". Max is able to stand up to the Wild Things with their "terrible teeth" and "terrible claws" using "the magic trick of staring into all their yellow eyes without blinking once".

Professor Liam Heneghan describes Max's dream as one of mastering the wild, from which he also learns to master his "inner tumult". It sets forth the unrestrained rowdiness of the Wild Things and enlightens the reader to the idea that one cannot live in the wild forever. In her words: "In this notion of wilderness, there is a heightened reminder that after our fill of wilderness, one can, or perhaps even should, return, replenished, to the comforts of home". Heneghan concludes that "the overarching thought is an old one: a human engages with Wild Things and in so doing comes into accord with the world and gains a measure of self-mastery".

=== Reception ===
Though the book received some criticism upon its release for being too scary for children, reception of Where the Wild Things Are has been largely positive. It won the 1964 Caldecott Medal, with the committee of librarians describing the wild things as "grotesque, kindly and humorous—never terrifying."

Francis Spufford suggests that Where the Wild Things Are is "one of the very few picture books to make an entirely deliberate and beautiful use of the psychoanalytic story of anger". New York Times writer Bruce Handy suggested that the story may resonate more with parents than with children. New York Times film critic Manohla Dargis noted that "there are different ways to read the wild things, through a Freudian or colonialist prism, and probably as many ways to ruin this delicate story of a solitary child liberated by his imagination". Based on a 2007 online poll, the National Education Association listed the book as one of its "Teachers' Top 100 Books for Children". Five years later, School Library Journal sponsored a survey of readers which identified Where the Wild Things Are as a top picture book. Elizabeth Bird, the librarian from the New York Public Library who conducted the survey, observed that there was little doubt that it would be voted number one and highlighted its designation by one reader as a watershed, "ushering in the modern age of picture books". Another critic called it "perfectly crafted, perfectly illustrated ... simply the epitome of a picture book" and noted that Sendak "rises above the rest in part because he is subversive". President Barack Obama read it aloud for children who were attending the White House Easter Egg Roll in multiple years.

Shortly after the book's release, child psychologist Bruno Bettelheim criticized it for depicting Max being sent to bed without dinner. Deborah Stevenson, a writer for The Horn Book Magazine, described a child who "screamed, apparently not with delight, every time Where the Wild Things Are was read to him. It is quite possible for some young readers or listeners to be moved to alarm by a book, just as they can be moved to joy or excitement or boredom". Sendak responded to this criticism in an interview, asking: "Did she hate her kid? Is that why she was tormenting her with this book?"

Despite the book's popularity, Sendak refused to produce a sequel; four months before his death in 2012, he told comedian Stephen Colbert that a sequel would be "the most boring idea imaginable". Where the Wild Things Are was number four on the list of "Top Check Outs of all time" by the New York Public Library.

== Adaptations ==
An animated short adaptation which had taken five years to complete was released in 1973, directed and animated by Gene Deitch and produced at Krátký film, Prague, for Weston Woods. It had narration by Allen Swift and a musique concrète score composed by Deitch; an updated version, which featured a new musical score and narration both by Peter Schickele, was released in 1988. This revised version was featured in a Children's Circle video titled The Maurice Sendak Library.

In the 1980s, Sendak worked with British composer Oliver Knussen on a children's opera based upon the book. The opera received its first (incomplete) performance in Brussels in 1980; the first complete performance of the final version was given by the Glyndebourne Touring Opera in London in 1984. This was followed by its first U.S. performance in Saint Paul, Minnesota, in 1985 and the New York City premiere by New York City Opera in 1987. A concert performance was given at The Proms in the Royal Albert Hall in London in 2002. A concert production was produced by New York City Opera in 2011.

In 1981, the New England Dinosaur Dance Company turned the book into a dance piece with choreography by Toby Armour and music by Ezra Sims. The piece debuted at Boston's Wilbur Theatre on December 22, 1981.

In 1983, Walt Disney Productions conducted a series of tests of computer-generated imagery created by Glen Keane and John Lasseter using as their subject Where the Wild Things Are.

In the late 1990s the characters appeared in a series of commercials for BellAtlantic.

In 1999, Isadar released a solo piano musical composition titled "Where the Wild Things Are" which appeared on his album Active Imagination, inspired by the Sendak book. The composition was revisited and re-recorded in 2012 on Isadar's album, Reconstructed, with Grammy winner and founder of Windham Hill Records, William Ackerman, producing.

A live-action film version of the book was released on October 16, 2009. Directed by Spike Jonze and co-produced by Sendak, the film stars Max Records as Max and features Catherine Keener as his mother, with Lauren Ambrose, Chris Cooper, Paul Dano, James Gandolfini, Catherine O'Hara and Forest Whitaker providing the voices of the principal Wild Things. The soundtrack was written and produced by Karen O and Carter Burwell. The screenplay was adapted by Jonze in collaboration with Dave Eggers, who also novelized the screenplay as The Wild Things, published in 2009.

== Cameos and inspirations ==
In 2006, the United States Postal Service issued a postage stamp of the book as part of the sheet of stamps "Favorite Children's Book Animals".

In 2012, indie rock quartet alt-J released the song "Breezeblocks", inspired in part by the book. Alt-J keyboardist Gus Unger-Hamilton said the story and the song share similar ideas about parting with a loved one. "Breezeblocks" reached certified ARIA Gold status in Australia.

In 2016, Alessia Cara released her second single, "Wild Things", which charted at number fifty on the Billboard Hot 100. In an interview with ABC News Radio, Cara stated she took inspiration from Where the Wild Things Are, saying "each 'Thing' represents an emotion and [the main character] kinda escapes into this world ... and that's kinda what I wanted to do".

== See also ==
- 1963 in literature
- List of children's books made into feature films
- List of children's classic books

Awards
| Preceded by The Snowy Day | Caldecott Medal recipient 1964 | Succeeded by May I Bring a Friend? |
