= The Little Bear Movie =

2001 film by Nelvana

- Digital release poster
- Directed by: Raymond Jafelice
- Screenplay by: James Still; Raymond Jafelice; Nancy Barr
- Story by: Else Holmelund Minarik
- Based on: Little Bear by Else Holmelund Minarik; Maurice Sendak
- Produced by: Maurice Sendak
- Starring: Kristin Fairlie; Kyle Fairlie; Amos Crawley; Tracy Ryan; Andrew Sabiston; Elizabeth Hanna; Wayne Best; Ray Landry; Janet-Laine Green; Dan Hennessey
- Music by: Lesley Barber
- Production companies: Nelvana Limited; Wild Things Productions Inc.
- Distributed by: Paramount Home Entertainment
- Release date: August 7, 2001
- Running time: 75 minutes
- Country: Canada
- Language: English

Maurice Sendak's Little Bear: The Little Bear Movie, or simply The Little Bear Movie, also known as Maurice Sendak's Little Bear: The Movie or simply Little Bear: The Movie, is a 2001 Canadian direct-to-video children's animated adventure film directed by Raymond Jafelice who co-wrote the screenplay with James Still and Nancy Barr. It is based on the Canadian children's animated television series Little Bear, which in turn is based on the children's book series of the same name written by Else Holmelund Minarik and illustrated by Maurice Sendak.

In the film, Little Bear meets a wild bear cub named Cub during a camping trip. Upon learning that Cub got separated from his parents, Little Bear and his friends embark on a journey to help him reunite with his parents while coming face-to-face with a ferocious mountain lion along the way.

The Little Bear Movie was co-produced by Nelvana Limited and Wild Things Productions Inc. The film was released direct-to-video on August 7, 2001, by Paramount Home Entertainment in the United States and Canada. The film received positive reviews from critics and has Kristin Fairlie reprise her role as Little Bear, while featuring her brother Kyle Fairlie as the voice of Cub.

In addition to Lesley Barber's instrumental track from the series, The Little Bear Movie features two original songs composed by Marc Jordan and Anthony Vanderbilt and performed by Shawn Colvin: "Great Big World" and "Everybody Wants To Paint My Picture."

== Plot ==
Little Bear and Father Bear set out on a camping trip. While camping on a hill Father Bear talks about the wilderness and the time he met an eagle. The next day Little Bear meets another bear in the wilderness called Cub. They both wrestle around in a river, Cub then chases after a moose leaving Little Bear all alone when he is met with a villainous mountain lion named Trouble, but Cub comes back and saves him from being eaten. They then enjoy a grilled fish breakfast together with Father Bear before they decide it's time to start heading home. Little Bear asks Cub if he wants to come with them, Cub agrees.

Back at the house, Cub tries to get used to living in a house. The whole family then makes Pancakes for lunch. Little Bear then wants Cub to meet his friends Cat, Owl, Duck, and Hen. When they learn that Cub got separated from his parents during an intense storm, they decide to go on a journey to search for them. They make missing person posters for Cub's parents and then head back into the wilderness to hang them up, the biggest one being a banner Little Bear made of Cub. However, the signs soon disappear. As they search for them, they meet their friend Moose, who shows that the other wilderness animals have been taking the papers to make nests, and that raccoons have used Little Bear's banner to make a dam, so they can catch the trapped fish in the lake. Little Bear and Cub try to recover the banner, but beavers, angry with the raccoons, break the dam, and in the process, Little Bear and Cub are washed away in a flood, straight over a waterfall. Separated from the rest of the group, they find Duck has wandered downstream as well, looking for Cub's parents, safeguarding their last sign in a canteen. However, Duck ended up dropping the canteen in the river accidentally. They try to grab it, but an eagle spots it and snatches it up. Frustrated and heartbroken, Cub is on the verge of giving up. Little Bear encourages him that they can try again the next day, but as they head back in the direction they were swept down river, night falls, and the three become lost in the dark wilderness, unable to find the rest of the gang. At the same time, Owl searches the woods for hours, but he sadly reports to Cat, Hen, and Moose that he couldn't find them. They all rush back to Little Bear's house to tell Mother and Father Bear what happened, so they can begin a larger search.

As the three try to seek shelter, they run into Cub's best friends Poppy and Pete, two playful and hyperactive red fox twins who took care of Cub after he got separated from his parents. They spend the night in the foxes' den and the next day they keep looking and head towards a canyon.

While trying to help Cub after he gets his foot stuck in some rocks, Duck encounters Trouble the mountain lion, who prepares to eat her. Duck flies away in terror. Trouble leaps high enough to snatch her, but Poppy and Pete tackle him at the last second, saving her, the three of them crashing into the river. After helping Poppy and Pete make it out of the river, Little Bear notices Trouble drowning and tries to help him, only to end up getting cornered. Trouble is about to attack Little Bear, only to get scared off by the arrival of Cub's parents. Cub and his parents are reunited. When Cub asks how they were able to find him, his Mom reveals that they encountered the eagle, who brought them the canteen with Cub's picture in it, indicating that he was close. Just after that, Little Bear is found by his own family and friends, being led by Duck, having flown high enough while fleeing Trouble to see them. After saying goodbye to Cub, Little Bear heads home and on the way back to the house it starts snowing.

Months later in the springtime, Little Bear and his friends play together with Poppy and Pete, a clear indication that Little Bear and Cub still stay in contact.

== Voice cast ==
- Kristin Fairlie as Little Bear
- Kyle Fairlie as Cub
- Amos Crawley as Owl
- Tracy Ryan as Duck
- Andrew Sabiston as Cat
- Elizabeth Hanna as Hen (uncredited)
- Wayne Best as Trouble the Mountain Lion
- Ray Landry as Moose
- Janet Laine-Green as Mother Bear
- Dan Hennessey as Father Bear
- Max Morrow as Little Moose
- Catherine Disher as Mother Moose
- Cole Caplan as Poppy
- Asa Perlman as Pete
- Maurice Dean Wint as Cub's Father
- Alison Sealy-Smith as Cub's Mother

== Release ==
The film was released on VHS and DVD by Paramount Home Entertainment. It also serves as the series finale.

== Reception ==
Tracy Moore of Common Sense Media gave the film a 5 out of 5 star rating, writing:

The Little Bear Movie, based on the TV series Little Bear, is such remarkably gentle, positive programming for children that it feels like an anomaly. Fit for any preschooler, and likely to incite a little nostalgia for organic, free-range play in adults, the film is slower-paced and practically quaint in its simple desire to show the budding friendship between a civilized bear and a wild bear, and the abiding respect they foster for each other's ways of life along the way.

Kids will enjoy the sweet friendships, the silly foxes, and the outdoor adventure. Parents will like the attention paid to the dangers of the outdoors, the free-spirited play driven by imagination and a cardboard box, and the family-friendly themes.

Shawn Colvin (performer) and Marc Jordan and Antony Vanderburgh (composers) were nominated for Best Original Song at the 2001 Video Premiere Awards for the song "Great Big World".
