= Koba Entertainment =

Koba Entertainment is a producer of original musical theatre based in Winnipeg, Manitoba, Canada. To date, they have produced numerous Canadian and U.S. tours for such famous children's properties as Bubble Guppies, Max & Ruby, Toopy & Binoo, The Backyardigans, The Big Comfy Couch, Caillou, The Doodlebops, Franklin the Turtle, and Maurice Sendak’s Little Bear.

== History and Staff ==
Koba was founded in 2004, and is part of the Paquin Entertainment Group, with offices in Winnipeg, Manitoba and Toronto, Ontario. The Executive Producer is Gilles Paquin, and artistic director is Patti Caplette.

== Productions ==
=== The Backyardigans ===
The Backyardigans is a 3-D CGI-animated children's TV series, created by Janice Burgess. It is a co-production of Nick Jr. and the Canadian animation studio Nelvana. It can currently be seen on Treehouse TV in Canada and Nick Jr. in the US.

==== Quest for the Extra Ordinary Aliens ====
The Backyardigans: Quest for the Extra Ordinary Aliens was the first of two live stage shows produced by Koba Entertainment. It originally toured across Canada in January 2008, and again in early 2009.
The Backyardigans: Quest for the Extra Ordinary Aliens was directed and choreographed by Patti Caplette, Artistic Director for KOBA Family Entertainment. An award-winning choreographer, performer and theatrical producer, Patti co-wrote Quest for the Extra Ordinary Aliens with New York-based television writer, Rodney Stringfellow, a contributing writer to the hit TV show. Original tunes from the TV show, composed by musician/composer Evan Lurie (The Lounge Lizards) figure prominently in the stage show.

==== Sea Deep in Adventure ====
The Backyardigans: Sea Deep in Adventure was developed and first toured in 2009. The Director/Choreographer was Patti Caplette, who also co-wrote the show with one of the TV shows' writers Rodney Stringfellow. The shows also feature the original music from the TV show, which was written by Evan Lurie.

The show saw Pablo, Tyrone, Tasha, Uniqua and Austin exploring underwater coral reefs, playing in an octopus's garden, and joining a jellyfish ballet.

=== The Big Comfy Couch ===
In 2007, a live theatrical production of The Big Comfy Couch entitled Molly's Fool Moon Festival toured in Canada. The show included Loonette the Clown, Molly, Granny Garbanzo, Major Bedhead and others.

The production was produced by Koba Entertainment, and presented by Paquin Entertainment Group.

=== Doodlebops ===
The Doodlebops is a Canadian television show for children. Beginning its TV broadcasting run in 2004, the series, produced by Cookie Jar Entertainment airs on the Canadian Broadcasting Corporation (CBC) in Canada in the CBC Kids morning program schedule, on the Disney Channel in the USA as part of the Playhouse Disney Morning programming schedule and on Playhouse Disney (UK) in the UK.

==== Together Forever ====
A live theatrical show entitled The Doodlebops: Together Forever Tour has been developed and toured Canada in early 2009. The show includes musical performances of signature favorites as well as new songs. The live version incorporates giant screens and original sets and costumes.

The show was produced by Koba Entertainment, and presented by Paquin Entertainment.

=== Franklin the Turtle ===
Franklin the Turtle is a Canadian/American children's television series, based on a series of books by Brenda Clark (illustrator) and Paulette Bourgeois (writer). The television series was named after its main character, Franklin the Turtle. In the Canadian French version, the cartoon shorts are presented with the title character of Benjamin and a similar theme song.

==== Franklin’s Family Christmas Concert ====
Franklin's Family Christmas Concert originally toured Canada in 2006, and again in 2008. This live musical production featured Franklin, Fox, Bear, Beaver and others as they throw a Christmas party celebrating the season.

The show was produced by Koba Entertainment, and was presented by Paquin Entertainment.

==== Franklin & The Noble Knights ====
Franklin & the Noble Knights was developed and toured Europe in 2009. It was touring in Canada in early 2010. The show sees Franklin on a quest to recover sister Harriet’s stolen golden necklace. He is joined by his friends Bear, Snail, Beaver, Fox, and Rabbit.

The show was produced by Koba Entertainment and presented by Paquin Entertainment.

==== Franklin’s Carnival of Animals ====
Franklin's Carnival of Animals was a live production featuring Franklin and his friends as they are taken on an outing to visit a Symphony Orchestra. The show featured a chamber orchestra, playing such pieces as The Teddy Bears' Picnic, The Flight of the Bumblebee and the Comedians' Galop.

The show was produced by Koba Entertainment and presented by Paquin Entertainment.

=== Little Bear ===
Little Bear is a children's television series. Originally produced by Nelvana for Nickelodeon, it currently airs on Treehouse TV in Canada and Nick Jr. in the United States.

It is based on the Little Bear series of books which were written by Else Holmelund Minarik, and illustrated by Maurice Sendak.

==== Little Bear: Winter Tails ====
Little Bear: Winter Tails is a live theatrical production, starring Little Bear and his friends as they explore the magical merriment of the Winter Season. All of his friends join him on stage, including Emily, Duck, Cat, Owl and Hen. The show first toured in 2007 and returned in the winter of 2009.

The show is produced by Koba Entertainment and presented by Paquin Entertainment.

== Future ==
The company continues to create new live theatrical shows for children.
