= David Wenzel =

American illustrator (born 1950)

- Wenzel appeared at That's Entertainment in Worcester MA on Free Comic Book Day, May 5, 2012
- Born: November 22, 1950 (age 76)
- Areas: Penciller, Inker, Colourist
- Notable works: The Hobbit: An Illustrated Edition of the Fantasy Classic; The Wizard's Tale; Avengers
- Awards: Eagle Award, 1979

David T. Wenzel (/ˈwɛnzəl/; born November 22, 1950) is an illustrator and children's book artist. He is best known for his graphic novel adaptation of J.R.R. Tolkien's The Hobbit.

== Career ==
Wenzel's first ambition had been to work for one of the big animation houses in California, but his early career path led him instead to work at an advertising agency and as a penciler in the mainstream comic book industry. From the mid-1970s to the early 1980s he worked on such Marvel Comics titles as Avengers and Savage Sword of Conan. He penciled part of The Avengers "Korvac Saga" story arc which won a 1979 Eagle Award for Best Continued Story.

Segueing from comics to children's literature in the 1980s, Wenzel illustrated Robb Walsh's Kingdom of the Dwarfs for Centaur Books, two books in the Little Bear book series, and then illustrated a series of books about American colonial life for Troll Associates.

Gollum, from Wenzel's adaptation of The Hobbit.

A recommendation from college classmate Larry Marder was key to Wenzel's landing his next major project. Marder was working with the people who had secured the rights to adapt The Hobbit to comics, and he knew firsthand that Wenzel had devoted his senior year in college to drawing Tolkien's characters. And so Wenzel provided the fully painted art for The Hobbit: An Illustrated Edition of the Fantasy Classic, a three-part adaptation of The Hobbit, written by Chuck Dixon and Sean Deming. The work was originally published by Eclipse Comics in 1989. Published in a collected edition by Ballantine in 1990, The Hobbit: An Illustrated Edition of the Fantasy Classic is one of the most successful graphic format adaptations of a piece of classic literature. In 2001, it was updated by Del Rey Books with a new cover, larger format, and 32 new pages of artwork.

Another graphic novel project in a similar vein was Wenzel and writer Douglas Wheeler's adaptation of some of the Brothers Grimm's fairytales for NBM in 1995. In 1998 Wenzel teamed with acclaimed comics writer Kurt Busiek on The Wizard’s Tale, the story of Evernight, a land ruled by a consortium of evil wizards who discover that one of their kind harbors a "dangerous" glimmer of good. The Wizard’s Tale was designed to be a crossover book that blended children's book elements with the format and readability of a graphic novel.

Other notable projects Wenzel has done include Robert L. May's Christmas bestseller Rudolph the Red Nosed Reindeer (Grosset and Dunlap, 2001); Max Lucado's A Hat For Ivan (Crossway Books, 2004); and several books in the Little Bear series which were art-directed by Maurice Sendak (HarperFestival, 2003–2004).

Wenzel's non-book related projects include puzzles, greeting cards, and two entire miniature kingdoms of collectible figurines. He also teaches at Lyme Academy College of Fine Arts in Connecticut.

Wenzel cites illustrators like Arthur Rackham, Edmund Dulac, N.C. Wyeth, and Howard Pyle as influences; as well as the Dutch painters Pieter Bruegel and Jan Steen.

== Personal life ==
Wenzel lives in Connecticut with his wife Janice, an artist and high school art teacher. Their sons Brendan and Christopher are both artists, and Wenzel's brother Greg is a book writer and illustrator.

== Awards ==
- 2014 Irma Black Award Honor for The King of Little Things

== Bibliography ==
=== Comics ===
- The Hobbit: An Illustrated Edition of the Fantasy Classic (with writers Chuck Dixon and Sean Deming; Eclipse Comics, 1989; Ballantine Books, 1990; Del Ray Books, 2001) ISBN 0-345-44560-0
- Aliens: Stalker (script and art, one-shot; Dark Horse Comics, 1989)
- Fairy Tales of the Brothers Grimm (with writer Douglas Wheeler; NBM, 1995) ISBN 1-56163-130-2
- The Wizard's Tale (with writer Kurt Busiek; Homage Comics, 1998) ISBN 1-56389-589-7

=== Illustrated books (selected) ===
- Middle Earth: the World of Tolkien Illustrated (with writer Lin Carter; Centaur Books, 1977) ISBN 0-87818-014-1
- Kingdom of the Dwarfs (with writer Robb Walsh; Centaur Books, 1980) ISBN 0-87818-017-6
- Boston Tea Party: Rebellion in the Colonies (with writer James E. Knight; Troll Associates, 1982) ISBN 0-89375-734-9
- Jamestown, New World Adventure (with writer James E. Knight; Troll Associates, 1982) ISBN 0-89375-724-1
- More About Dinosaurs (with writer David Cutts; Troll Associates, 1982) ISBN 0-89375-668-7
- Salem Days: Life in a Colonial Seaport (with writer James E. Knight; Troll Associates, 1982) ISBN 0-89375-732-2
- Pilgrims and Thanksgiving (with writer Rae Bains; Troll Associates, 1985) ISBN 0-8167-0222-5
- Hauntings: Ghosts and Ghouls from Around the World (with writer Margaret Hodges; Little, Brown, and Co., 1991) ISBN 0-316-36796-6
- The Liberty Tree: the Beginning of the American Revolution (with writer Lucille Recht Penner; Random House, 1998) ISBN 0-679-83482-6
- Halloween Night (with writer Arden Druce; Rising Moon, 2001) ISBN 0-87358-762-6
- Sebastian in Central Park (with writer Margaret Hall; Bear & Co., 2001) ISBN 0-9713174-0-2
- Rudolph the Red-Nosed Reindeer (with writer Robert Lewis May; Grosset & Dunlap, 2001) ISBN 0-448-42534-3
- Little Bear's Bad Day (with writer Else Holmelund Minarik; HarperFestival, 2003) ISBN 0-06-053546-6
- Little Bear's Picture (with writer Else Holmelund Minarik; HarperFestival, 2003) ISBN 0-694-01701-9
- Lost in Little Bear's Room (with writer Else Holmelund Minarik; HarperFestival, 2004) ISBN 0-694-01706-X
- Lucky Little Bear (with writer Else Holmelund Minarik; HarperFestival, 2004) ISBN 0-694-01700-0
- A Hat for Ivan (with writer Max Lucado; Crossway Books, 2004) ISBN 1-58134-414-7
- Your Special Gift (with writer Max Lucado; Crossway Books, 2006) ISBN 1-58134-698-0
- Rodeo Time (with writer Stuart J. Murphy; HarperCollins, 2006) ISBN 978-0-06-055778-2
- Baby Loves You So Much! (with writer Eileen Spinelli; Ideals Children's Books, 2007) ISBN 978-0-8249-5550-2
- Kapheus Earth (with writer Marguerite Tonery; TribesPress, 2014) ISBN 978-0-9573812-4-7
- Kapheus Air (with writer Marguerite Tonery; TribesPress, 2015) ISBN 978-0-9573812-6-1
- Kapheus Water (with writer Marguerite Tonery; TribesPress, 2016) ISBN 978-0-9573812-8-5
