= List of Little Bear episodes =

This is a list of episodes of the children's television series Little Bear. There are a total of sixty-five episodes in the show, each consisting of three seven-and-a-half-minute segments.

== Series overview ==
| Season | Segments | Episodes | Originally released | |
| Season | Segments | Episodes | First released | Last released |
|---|---|---|---|---|
| 1 | 39 | 13 | November 6, 1995 | February 12, 1996 |
| 2 | 39 | 13 | September 9, 1996 | December 23, 1996 |
| 3 | 39 | 13 | May 6, 1997 | November 17, 1997 |
| 4 | 39 | 13 | January 4, 1999 | February 12, 1999 |
| 5 | 39 | 13 | February 21, 2000 | June 1, 2001 |

== Episodes ==
=== Season 1 (1995–96) ===
Note: All episodes in this season were directed by Raymond Jafelice.

| No. overall | No. in season | Title | Written by | Original release date |
|---|---|---|---|---|
| 1 | 1 | "What Will Little Bear Wear?" | Neena Beber | November 6, 1995 |
| 1 | 1 | "Hide and Seek" | Neena Beber | November 6, 1995 |
| 1 | 1 | "Little Bear Goes to the Moon" | Neena Beber | November 6, 1995 |
"What Will Little Bear Wear?" – Little Bear wants some clothes to wear outside in the snow, but he realizes he's not at all cold and shows Mother Bear his snow bear.; "Hide and Seek" – Little Bear and his friends play hide and seek. Being the seeker is a little bit hard for Duck so Little Bear assists her.; "Little Bear Goes to the Moon" – Little Bear is disappointed he can't fly to the Moon. He instead pretends to travel to the Moon.
| 2 | 2 | "Birthday Soup" | Suzanne Collins | November 13, 1995 |
| 2 | 2 | "Polar Bear" | Suzanne Collins | November 13, 1995 |
| 2 | 2 | "Gone Fishing" | Peter Parnell | November 13, 1995 |
"Birthday Soup" – It's Little Bear's 6th birthday, but he thinks his mother has forgotten. Little Bear's friends, Hen, Duck, and Cat come over, while he makes his own birthday soup.; "Polar Bear" – When Little Bear goes to paint Hen's house, he gets covered in white paint. Little Bear thinks he's a polar bear from the North Pole until Mother Bear gives him a bath.; "Gone Fishing" – Little Bear goes fishing with Owl. Fishing is hard work for Little Bear that he falls asleep and dreams about big game fishing.
| 3 | 3 | "Up All Night" | Suzanne Collins | November 20, 1995 |
| 3 | 3 | "Little Bear's Bath" | Peter Hume | November 20, 1995 |
| 3 | 3 | "Father Bear Comes Home" | Peter Hume and Neena Beber | November 20, 1995 |
"Up All Night" – Little Bear wants to stay up all night to see the sunrise. Mother Bear finally allows him, but he falls asleep and dreams about the sunrise.; "Little Bear's Bath" – After getting muddy, Little Bear takes a bath. He imagines himself in the deep ocean meeting a mermaid while his father is fishing.; "Father Bear Comes Home" – Father Bear is returning home today. Little Bear invites his friends to see him coming and Father Bear has presents for everyone.
| 4 | 4 | "A Flu" | Peter Parnell | November 27, 1995 |
| 4 | 4 | "Exploring" | Peter Parnell | November 27, 1995 |
| 4 | 4 | "Fishing with Father Bear" | Peter Hume | November 27, 1995 |
"A Flu" – Little Bear wakes up with flu and has to stay in bed all day. His friends, Cat, Duck and Hen come and try to help him. The next morning Little Bear is all better so that he and Mother Bear can do some housework.; "Exploring" – Little Bear, Duck and Cat explore the forest to find a landmark where the Bear parents went together. Along the way, they stumble into Skunk's den.; "Fishing with Father Bear" – Little Bear and Father Bear go fishing together and its Little Bear's first time riding a boat. They soon get their big catch.
| 5 | 5 | "Little Bear's Wish" | Peter Parnell | December 4, 1995 |
| 5 | 5 | "Little Bear's Shadow" | Peter Parnell | December 4, 1995 |
| 5 | 5 | "A Present for Mother Bear" | Peter Parnell | December 4, 1995 |
"Little Bear's Wish" – Little Bear makes a wish from a star. He dreams of wonderful fantasies as he makes wish after wish. Then Mother Bear tells him a bedtime story.; "Little Bear's Shadow" – Little Bear is bored today without any of his friends to play with. He amuses himself by playing with his own shadow.; "A Present for Mother Bear" – Today is Mother Bear's birthday, but Little Bear forgot to get a present. His friends also have presents to give to Mother Bear.
| 6 | 6 | "To Grandmother's House" | Nancy Barr | December 11, 1995 |
| 6 | 6 | "Grandfather Bear" | Nancy Barr | December 11, 1995 |
| 6 | 6 | "Mother Bear's Robin" | Nancy Barr | December 11, 1995 |
"To Grandmother's House" – Little Bear visits his grandparents' house. Along the way, he and his friends eat all the gifts that were meant for Grandmother.; "Grandfather Bear" – Little Bear and Grandfather Bear spend the day together. At first, Grandfather feels energetic but after lunch, he takes a rest.; "Mother Bear's Robin" – Grandmother Bear tells Little Bear a story about Mother Bear who raised a baby robin that was separated from its nest. When the robin grew up, Mother Bear set it free.
| 7 | 7 | "Hiccups" | Alyse Rosenberg | December 18, 1995 |
| 7 | 7 | "Date with Father Bear" | Alyse Rosenberg | December 18, 1995 |
| 7 | 7 | "Pudding Hill" | Story by : Else Holmelund Minarik; Teleplay by : Alyse Rosenberg | December 18, 1995 |
"Hiccups" – Little Bear's friends come to play at his house, but the Bear parents want them to stay quiet. Little Bear then develops hiccups and his friends and Mother Bear try everything.; "Date with Father Bear" – It's the morning of Father Bear's playdate with Little Bear, except that he's fast asleep or so Little Bear thinks.; "Pudding Hill" – Little Bear and Father Bear go hiking through the country to go camping. Little Bear meets some beavers who take him to see Pudding Hill and join in the camping.; Note: Else Holmelund Minarik does not receive a story-by credit on the YouTube version of "Pudding Hill." However, she is credited in the Paramount+ version.
| 8 | 8 | "Little Bear's Mermaid" | Nancy Barr | December 25, 1995 |
| 8 | 8 | "Father's Flying Flapjacks" | Story by : Else Holmelund Minarik; Teleplay by : Nancy Barr | December 25, 1995 |
| 8 | 8 | "Maracas" | Nancy Barr | December 25, 1995 |
"Little Bear's Mermaid" – Little Bear, Mother Bear, Father Bear, Hen, Cat, and Owl go to the lake for a picnic. As he swims by himself, he spots and meets a mermaid.; "Father's Flying Flapjacks" – Little Bear and Father Bear prepare a surprise breakfast for Mother Bear. They have a lot of fun making Flying Flapjacks.; "Maracas" – While Little Bear and his parents remove some old stuff, they look at their memoirs especially a pair of maracas. Little Bear's friends misunderstand the origin of the maracas.
| 9 | 9 | "A Family Portrait" | Neena Beber | January 15, 1996 |
| 9 | 9 | "Little Bear's New Friend" | Neena Beber | January 15, 1996 |
| 9 | 9 | "Emily's Visit" | Neena Beber | January 15, 1996 |
"Family Portrait" – Little Bear invites his friends to see Father Bear's camera. Little Bear uses up most of the film, but Father Bear manages to take a picture of all the family and friends.; "Little Bear's New Friend" – Little Bear meets a girl named Emily and her doll Lucy. Together they go through the forest and find Emily's parents at a campsite. Then Little Bear returns home.; "Emily's Visit" – Emily comes to visit Little Bear and they play dress up.; Note: In "Emily's Visit", Owl knows Emily even though they haven't met, which makes this episode take place after "Duck, Baby Sitter".
| 10 | 10 | "Duck, Baby Sitter" | Suzanne Collins | January 22, 1996 |
| 10 | 10 | "Little Bear's Band" | Suzanne Collins | January 22, 1996 |
| 10 | 10 | "Hop Frog Pond" | Story by : Else Holmelund Minarik; Teleplay by : Suzanne Collins | January 22, 1996 |
"Duck, Baby Sitter" – Emily goes on a picnic to meet Little Bear's friends. Duck has brought her mischievous ducklings. Little Peep goes missing then rejoins the others.; "Little Bear's Band" – Mother Bear is preparing for her parents' 50th wedding anniversary. The gramophone breaks, so Little Bear forms a band for the party.; "Hop Frog Pond" – It's almost time for Emily to go back home for the school year, so she and all her friends go to Hop-Frog Pond. They have a great time swimming with the frogs and otters.
| 11 | 11 | "Little Bear and the Wind" | Michael Thoma | January 29, 1996 |
| 11 | 11 | "The Goblin Story" | John Lazarus | January 29, 1996 |
| 11 | 11 | "Not Tired" | John Lazarus | January 29, 1996 |
"Little Bear and the Wind" – Little Bear gets scared from loud creaking caused by a strong wind. Mother Bear comforts him with a story about Father Bear and the Wind.; "The Goblin Story" – Little Bear lies to Grandfather Bear about a goblin eating some blueberries and Grandfather Bear tells Little Bear a story about a goblin.; "Not Tired" – Little Bear is so interested in his Goldbergian track that he tires himself out and after completing his invention, falls fast asleep.
| 12 | 12 | "Grandfather's Attic" | John Lazarus | February 5, 1996 |
| 12 | 12 | "Little Bear's Egg" | Michael Thoma | February 5, 1996 |
| 12 | 12 | "Party at Owl's House" | Michael Thoma | February 5, 1996 |
"Grandfather's Attic" – Little Bear helps Grandfather Bear to clean out some things from the attic. The items in the attic bring back the memories and Grandfather Bear considers keeping everything.; "Little Bear's Egg" – As Little Bear and Emily pick fruit, they come across a stray robin egg. They manage to find its mother and put it back in the nest moments before it hatches.; "Party at Owl's House" – Owl decides to throw a 'Because Party' for Emily. As the party starts, Mother and Father Bear come and bring chocolate cake and lemonade.
| 13 | 13 | "The Rain Dance Play" | Story by : Else Holmelund Minarik; Teleplay by : Nancy Barr | February 12, 1996 |
| 13 | 13 | "Your Friend, Little Bear" | Nancy Barr | February 12, 1996 |
| 13 | 13 | "Fall Dream" | Nancy Barr | February 12, 1996 |
"The Rain Dance Play" – Little Bear and his friends put on a Rain-Dance Play, hoping that they'll make it rain. And sure enough, it really does after the play.; "Your Friend, Little Bear" – Today Little Bear is very sad that Emily is leaving to go back to school. With the new pen Emily gave him, he soon learns how to write a letter to Emily.; "Fall Dream" – Little Bear falls asleep after raking the leaves and dreams he's playing with his friends through fall, winter, and spring. Emily comes over to visit for the weekend.

=== Season 2 (1996) ===
| No. overall | No. in season | Title | Directed by | Written by | Original release date |
|---|---|---|---|---|---|
| 14 | 1 | "Little Bear the Magician" | Raymond Jafelice and Arna Selznick | Michelle Lowe | September 9, 1996 |
| 14 | 1 | "Doctor Little Bear" | Raymond Jafelice and Arna Selznick | Michael Thoma | September 9, 1996 |
| 14 | 1 | "Bigger Little Bear" | Raymond Jafelice and Arna Selznick | James Still | September 9, 1996 |
"Little Bear the Magician" – Because of his eating habits, Mother Bear jokingly convinces Little Bear he's a magician. Owl tries to prove Little Bear wrong.; "Doctor Little Bear" – Little Bear pretends to be a doctor when Mother Bear catches a chill then takes over doing the laundry. Little Bear's friends show concern for Mother Bear.; "Bigger Little Bear" – Little Bear is excited becoming bigger as he grows up. Not satisfied with his growth rate, he dreams of being a giant bear, which has its disadvantages.
| 15 | 2 | "Little Bear's Trip to the Stars" | Raymond Jafelice and Arna Selznick | Michelle Lowe | September 10, 1996 |
| 15 | 2 | "Little Bear's Surprise" | Raymond Jafelice and Arna Selznick | James Still | September 10, 1996 |
| 15 | 2 | "Little Bear and the North Pole" | Raymond Jafelice and Arna Selznick | Michael Thoma | September 10, 1996 |
"Little Bear's Trip to the Stars" – On a fishing trip with Father Bear, Little Bear takes an interest in the night sky. Then he dreams of a fantastic trip to the stars.; "Little Bear's Surprise" – Little Bear tries to construct his own object out of wood using Father Bear's tools. Then his friends come to help and they end building a lemonade stand.; "Little Bear and the North Pole" – Little Bear goes on a journey to the north pole, taking Duck with him. Their journey ends at a pole in the ground.
| 16 | 3 | "Cat's Short Cut" | Raymond Jafelice and Arna Selznick | Michael Thoma | September 11, 1996 |
| 16 | 3 | "Little Bear's Bad Day" | Raymond Jafelice and Arna Selznick | Nancy Barr | September 11, 1996 |
| 16 | 3 | "Captain Little Bear" | Raymond Jafelice and Arna Selznick | Michael Thoma | September 11, 1996 |
"Cat's Short Cut" – Little Bear and Owl try to take the shortcut Cat always takes, but they get lost and back where they started, so Cat shows them the right path.; "Little Bear's Bad Day" – Today Little Bear is getting accident-prone and taking wrong turns every time. At night, Little Bear sleeps with his parents to forget his troubles.; "Captain Little Bear" – Little Bear and Cat play pirates, then Hen, Duck and Owl join in. They sail to the Lost Island, find the treasure then lose it.
| 17 | 4 | "Little Bear Meets No Feet" | Raymond Jafelice and Arna Selznick | Story by : Else Holmelund Minarik; Teleplay by : Nancy Barr | September 17, 1996 |
| 17 | 4 | "The Camp Out" | Raymond Jafelice and Arna Selznick | James Still | September 17, 1996 |
| 17 | 4 | "Emily's Balloon" | Raymond Jafelice and Arna Selznick | Michelle Lowe | September 17, 1996 |
"Little Bear Meets No Feet" – While picking some vegetables, Little Bear meets a snake called No Feet and decides to adopt him. Little Bear then tries to find a suitable bed for No Feet.; "The Camp Out" – Little Bear and Grandfather Bear go camping outside for the night. They spend much of the time singing.; "Emily's Balloon" – Today is Hen's birthday. Emily is the only one who couldn't make it. Little Bear tries to deliver an orange balloon to Emily.
| 18 | 5 | "Building a House for Emily" | Raymond Jafelice and Arna Selznick | Story by : Else Holmelund Minarik; Teleplay by : James Still | October 8, 1996 |
| 18 | 5 | "Emily Returns" | Raymond Jafelice and Arna Selznick | James Still | October 8, 1996 |
| 18 | 5 | "Little Sherlock Bear" | Raymond Jafelice and Arna Selznick | Suzanne Collins | October 8, 1996 |
"Building a House for Emily" – Little Bear, Father Bear, Grandfather Bear and Uncle Rusty construct a house for Emily and her Granny.; "Emily Returns" – Emily and her Granny come to their new house and meet Little Bear and his friends and family for the first time.; "Little Sherlock Bear" – While Little Bear plays hide and seek, Father Bear's pie vanishes. Little Bear investigates his friends one by one until he finds that the pie was never stolen.
| 19 | 6 | "Little Bear's Tooth" | Raymond Jafelice, Arna Selznick and John Van Bruggen | Suzanne Collins | October 11, 1996 |
| 19 | 6 | "Little Red Riding Hood" | Raymond Jafelice, Arna Selznick and John Van Bruggen | Suzanne Collins | October 11, 1996 |
| 19 | 6 | "Little Bear and the Cupcakes" | Raymond Jafelice, Arna Selznick and John Van Bruggen | Story by : Else Holmelund Minarik; Teleplay by : James Still | October 11, 1996 |
"Little Bear's Tooth" – One of Little Bear's teeth becomes loose, so he tries some methods to get it out, but it comes out easily when he eats a cob of corn.; "Little Red Riding Hood" – On a rainy day, Granny tells Little Bear and his friends the tale of Little Red Riding Hood with Emily portrayed as Little Red Riding Hood and the others with certain roles.; "Little Bear and the Cupcakes" – Little Bear and Emily make some cupcakes. But the cupcakes bake rock hard in the oven. They hide them from Mother Bear, not knowing they forgot the baking powder.
| 20 | 7 | "Snowball Fight" | Raymond Jafelice, Arna Selznick and John Van Bruggen | Nancy Barr | October 21, 1996 |
| 20 | 7 | "Winter Solstice" | Raymond Jafelice, Arna Selznick and John Van Bruggen | Story by : Hasmi Giakoumis and James Still; Teleplay by : James Still | October 21, 1996 |
| 20 | 7 | "Snowbound" | Raymond Jafelice, Arna Selznick and John Van Bruggen | Story by : Else Holmelund Minarik; Teleplay by : James Still | October 21, 1996 |
"Snowball Fight" – Little Bear and Father Bear take a walk through the snow. Little Bear, Father Bear, Cat, Hen, Owl and Duck have a big snowball fight until Mother Bear joins in.; "Winter Solstice" – The Bear family celebrate the Winter Solstice and their friends grow acquainted with the traditions.; "Snowbound" – Little Bear and his parents visit Emily and Granny. Snow surrounds the house forcing the Bear family to stay the night. The next morning Moose clears a path for them to walk home.
| 21 | 8 | "Little Bear's Garden" | Raymond Jafelice, Arna Selznick and John Van Bruggen | Michael Thoma | November 5, 1996 |
| 21 | 8 | "Prince Little Bear" | Raymond Jafelice, Arna Selznick and John Van Bruggen | James Still | November 5, 1996 |
| 21 | 8 | "A Painting for Emily" | Raymond Jafelice, Arna Selznick and John Van Bruggen | Story by : Else Holmelund Minarik; Teleplay by : Suzanne Collins | November 5, 1996 |
"Little Bear's Garden" – Little Bear wants a garden patch of his own, so Mother Bear helps him to plant sunflowers. Little Bear then learns growing plants requires patience.; "Prince Little Bear" – Emily takes the role of princess and Little Bear goes on an adventure to prove he's a prince on King Owl's behalf.; "A Painting for Emily" – While Little Bear babysits Tutu and Lucy for Emily, he paints a picture of Lucy to surprise Emily. However, Tutu gets jealous of being left out of the picture.
| 22 | 9 | "Follow the Leader" | Raymond Jafelice, Arna Selznick and John Van Bruggen | Suzanne Collins | November 20, 1996 |
| 22 | 9 | "Little Scarecrow Bear" | Raymond Jafelice, Arna Selznick and John Van Bruggen | Story by : Else Holmelund Minarik; Teleplay by : Nancy Barr | November 20, 1996 |
| 22 | 9 | "Little Bear and the Baby" | Raymond Jafelice, Arna Selznick and John Van Bruggen | Marlene Matthews | November 20, 1996 |
"Follow the Leader" – On a hot day, Little Bear and his friends play Follow the Leader to get to Hop-Frog Pond. They take it turns to be a leader until they tumble into the pond.; "Little Scarecrow Bear" – When the wind blows down the garden scarecrow, Little Bear unsuccessfully tries to scare some crows himself. Eventually, he befriends them.; "Little Bear and the Baby" – Little Bear helps Mother Bear babysit a baby raccoon. Little Bear names him Ick and plays with him.
| 23 | 10 | "Rafting on the River" | Raymond Jafelice, Arna Selznick and John Van Bruggen | Story by : Else Holmelund Minarik; Teleplay by : Michael Thoma | November 25, 1996 |
| 23 | 10 | "Little Bear's Kite" | Raymond Jafelice, Arna Selznick and John Van Bruggen | Suzanne Collins | November 25, 1996 |
| 23 | 10 | "Night of the Full Moon" | Raymond Jafelice, Arna Selznick and John Van Bruggen | Story by : Else Holmelund Minarik; Teleplay by : Betty Quan | November 25, 1996 |
"Rafting on the River" – Emily and Little Bear are enjoying themselves on a raft. Then the raft drifts down the river. Little Bear's friends then challenge Emily and Little Bear to a race.; "Little Bear's Kite" – It's a windy day, so Little Bear and Grandfather Bear make a kite. While Little Bear flies his kite, he spots another kite that Emily is flying.; "Night of the Full Moon" – Father Bear reads Little Bear a bedtime story about monsters in the moonlight. Then they act out the story and get back home in time to meet Mother Bear.
| 24 | 11 | "Auntie Hen" | Raymond Jafelice, Arna Selznick and John Van Bruggen | Story by : Else Holmelund Minarik; Teleplay by : Nancy Barr | December 3, 1996 |
| 24 | 11 | "Play Ball" | Raymond Jafelice, Arna Selznick and John Van Bruggen | Story by : Else Holmelund Minarik; Teleplay by : Betty Quan | December 3, 1996 |
| 24 | 11 | "Lucy's Okay" | Raymond Jafelice, Arna Selznick and John Van Bruggen | Story by : Else Holmelund Minarik; Teleplay by : Nancy Barr | December 3, 1996 |
"Auntie Hen" – Little Bear brings Hen's nieces and nephews to visit her. They cause much mischief and mess around the house as they play.; "Play Ball" – Little Bear is pretty grouchy that Emily kept his favorite ball and declares he's not speaking to her anymore, but he and his friends begin a game of baseball. Both Little Bear and Emily apologize to each other for being grumpy and become friends again.; "Lucy's Okay" – Emily entrusts Owl to take care of Lucy, but Duck sits on her which shocks Emily. Little Bear, Emily and their friends all hold a funeral, but Lucy seems fine again.
| 25 | 12 | "Between Friends" | Raymond Jafelice, Arna Selznick and John Van Bruggen | Betty Quan | December 16, 1996 |
| 25 | 12 | "The Blueberry Picnic" | Raymond Jafelice, Arna Selznick and John Van Bruggen | Story by : Else Holmelund Minarik; Teleplay by : Michael Thoma | December 16, 1996 |
| 25 | 12 | "Lucy Needs a Friend" | Raymond Jafelice, Arna Selznick and John Van Bruggen | Story by : Else Holmelund Minarik; Teleplay by : Marlene Matthews | December 16, 1996 |
"Between Friends" – Little Bear is sick in bed with Mumps. Emily visits and gives Little Bear a book she wrote about their past events. Soon Emily gets mumps and Little Bear visits her.; "The Blueberry Picnic" – Everyone comes to see the Blueberry play about "The Troll that lived under the bridge" before the Blueberry picnic takes place.; "Lucy Needs a Friend" – On a fishing trip, Emily pays more attention to Lucy than Little Bear, so Little Bear and Mother Bear decide to make Lucy a friend.
| 26 | 13 | "Picnic on Pudding Hill" | Raymond Jafelice, Arna Selznick and John Van Bruggen | Story by : Else Holmelund Minarik; Teleplay by : Betty Quan | December 23, 1996 |
| 26 | 13 | "Little Bear's Walkabout" | Raymond Jafelice, Arna Selznick and John Van Bruggen | Story by : Else Holmelund Minarik; Teleplay by : Michael Thoma | December 23, 1996 |
| 26 | 13 | "Secret Friend" | Raymond Jafelice, Arna Selznick and John Van Bruggen | Raymond Jafelice | December 23, 1996 |
"Picnic on Pudding Hill" – Little Bear and his friends walk to Pudding Hill for a picnic. No Feet joins in. On the top of the hill, Emily's hat blows away and No Feet begins the picnic by himself.; "Little Bear's Walkabout" – Little Bear goes on a walk through the forest to find a mysterious creature to draw. He finds a moth, a tortoise and a woodpecker.; "Secret Friend" – At the coast Little Bear talks with his secret friend Whale. They spend a long time exchanging facts about land and sea.; Note: These episodes were dedicated to the memory of Claude Bede, who died in 1996 before the episodes premiered.

=== Season 3 (1997) ===
Note: All episodes in this season were directed by Arna Selznick.

| No. overall | No. in season | Title | Written by | Original release date |
|---|---|---|---|---|
| 27 | 1 | "Owl's Dilemma" | Story by : Else Holmelund Minarik; Teleplay by : Marlene Matthews and James Still | May 6, 1997 |
| 27 | 1 | "School for Otters" | Story by : Else Holmelund Minarik; Teleplay by : Betty Quan | May 6, 1997 |
| 27 | 1 | "Spring Cleaning" | Betty Quan | May 6, 1997 |
"Owl's Dilemma" – Tired of his noisy neighbors, Owl tries to find another place to sleep. Wherever he goes there's always noise. Owl solves this problem with a couple of cupcakes.; "School for Otters" – Little Bear and Emily's idea for a school attracts the otters to be the students. The otters have more fun and play than learning, but then they form their own school.; "Spring Cleaning" – Today Little Bear and his parents do their annual spring cleaning. Father Bear and Little Bear get carried away with having fun, so they try to surprise Mother Bear with a picnic.
| 28 | 2 | "Whale of a Tale" | James Still | May 15, 1997 |
| 28 | 2 | "Mitzi Arrives" | James Still | May 15, 1997 |
| 28 | 2 | "Granny's Old Flying Rug" | Story by : Else Holmelund Minarik; Teleplay by : Betty Quan | May 15, 1997 |
"Whale of a Tale" – On a voyage to Blue Hill Island, Father Bear tells Little Bear of his old whale friend Mighty who got beached and rescued.; "Mitzi Arrives" – A tomboy monkey named Mitzi is on safari and meets Little Bear and his friends and tries to fit in, joining in their jump rope game.; "Granny's Old Flying Rug" – Granny brings out her old rug. Upon saying the magic word, Little Bear flies with Emily and Tutu on the rug.
| 29 | 3 | "Little Bear Sing a Song" | James Still | May 21, 1997 |
| 29 | 3 | "A House for Mitzi" | James Still | May 21, 1997 |
| 29 | 3 | "Up a Tree" | Story by : Else Holmelund Minarik; Teleplay by : Betty Quan | May 21, 1997 |
"Little Bear Sing a Song" – Little Bear and his friends try to write their own song. The composition goes smoothly while Mother Bear waits for Little Bear to come inside for bed.; "A House for Mitzi" – Little Bear finds Mitzi sleeping on a tree, so he and his friends build a treehouse for her. Mitzi still prefers to sleep on the tree branches.; "Up a Tree" – Little Bear joins Mitzi in a game of tree climbing. Little Bear practices and manages to keep up with Mitzi's great climbing skills.
| 30 | 4 | "The Big Bear Sitter" | Michael Thoma | May 27, 1997 |
| 30 | 4 | "The Top of the World" | Michael Thoma | May 27, 1997 |
| 30 | 4 | "The Campfire Tale" | Michael Thoma | May 27, 1997 |
"The Big Bear Sitter" – Uncle Rusty babysits Little Bear in his parents' absence. Little Bear's friends try to teach Rusty something about babysitting.; "The Top of the World" – Little Bear and Father Bear go with Uncle Rusty on an adventure hiking up a big mountain. By nightfall they reach the summit.; "The Campfire Tale" – On the night of a full moon, Uncle Rusty tells Little Bear and Father Bear a tale about a small bear who wanted to take the Moon with him.
| 31 | 5 | "Mitzi's Little Monster" | Story by : Else Holmelund Minarik; Teleplay by : Betty Quan | June 2, 1997 |
| 31 | 5 | "Simon Says" | James Still | June 2, 1997 |
| 31 | 5 | "Applesauce" | Story by : Else Holmelund Minarik; Teleplay by : James Still | June 2, 1997 |
"Mitzi's Little Monster" – Little Bear, Emily and Mitzi put on a puppet show using their dolls. The show is about a monster that comes to tea.; "Simon Says" – Little Bear and his friends all play Simon Says. First Emily, then Little Bear, then Mitzi and finally Duck play as Simon.; "Applesauce" – Little Bear, Emily and Tutu pick apples for Granny's applesauce. Little Bear gets a large apple that falls on a toad. The toad comes to Granny's for a share of applesauce.
| 32 | 6 | "Father Bear's Nightshirt" | Y York | June 11, 1997 |
| 32 | 6 | "How to Scare Ghosts" | Story by : Else Holmelund Minarik; Teleplay by : Michael Thoma | June 11, 1997 |
| 32 | 6 | "Search for Spring" | Suzanne Collins | June 11, 1997 |
"Father Bear's Nightshirt" – While Little Bear helps Mother Bear with the laundry, Father Bear's nightshirt flies away in the wind. When Little Bear gets it back, he also gets a fish.; "How to Scare Ghosts" – Little Bear finds three ghostly raccoons making music. Little Bear joins them but his mother and father's presence scares them away.; "Search for Spring" – Little Bear, Duck and Cat, tired of the long winter, ask Groundhog to predict the start of Spring. Spring came earlier than they expected.
| 33 | 7 | "Out of Honey" | Y York | October 7, 1997 |
| 33 | 7 | "Message in a Bottle" | Betty Quan | October 7, 1997 |
| 33 | 7 | "Little Bear's Sweet Tooth" | Suzanne Collins | October 7, 1997 |
"Out of Honey" – Little Bear heads to his grandparents' house to get some honey while trying to keep Mitzi out of trouble. Using beekeeper equipment Little Bear and his grandparents get some honey.; "Message in a Bottle" – Little Bear catches a bottle on his rod. He dreams of meeting his mermaid friend again and doing some shell collecting. Soon he catches a large fish for stew. When he arrives back home, Father Bear returns from his fishing trip and gives Little Bear a surprise.; "Little Bear's Sweet Tooth" – Today, Little Bear and his family and friends are celebrating Harvest Day. Little Bear is more interested in the desserts and soon gets a stomach ache.
| 34 | 8 | "Where Lucy Went" | Michael Thoma | October 15, 1997 |
| 34 | 8 | "Monster Pudding" | James Still | October 15, 1997 |
| 34 | 8 | "Under the Covers" | Betty Quan | October 15, 1997 |
"Where Lucy Went" – Little Bear and his friends have fun the tallest tree in the woods, then Lucy vanishes. Everyone thinks goblins took her away, but they find her under a large rock.; "Monster Pudding" – Today Father Bear is grouchy and Little Bear imagines him as a monster. Owl and Mitzi help him to make monster pudding, creating a mess in the process.; "Under the Covers" – Little Bear can't sleep, thinking there are bedbugs. When he wakes up his parents, a tickle fight and game of bedbugs ensue, until they all get drowsy.
| 35 | 9 | "Gingerbread Cookies" | James Still | October 21, 1997 |
| 35 | 9 | "Marbles" | Jeff Stockwell | October 21, 1997 |
| 35 | 9 | "The Garden War" | Suzanne Collins | October 21, 1997 |
"Gingerbread Cookies" – Little Bear, Emily and Granny make some gingerbread cookies. Then the cookies mysteriously runoff. Little Bear and his friends chase them back to Granny's house.; "Marbles" – Father Bear shows Little Bear how to play with marbles. When Little Bear's friends play the game, Mitzi gets all the marbles, but Little Bear manages to win them back.; "The Garden War" – A mole is tunneling in the Bear family's garden. Little Bear and No Feet set a trap, but they find out the mole isn't scary at all and they become friends with him.
| 36 | 10 | "The Red Thread" | Y York | October 30, 1997 |
| 36 | 10 | "Princess Duck" | Story by : Else Holmelund Minarik; Teleplay by : Betty Quan | October 30, 1997 |
| 36 | 10 | "Little Bear Meets Duck" | Story by : Else Holmelund Minarik; Teleplay by : Suzanne Collins | October 30, 1997 |
"The Red Thread" – As Little Bear tries to retrieve Mother Bear's red thread, he imagines himself the size of an ant, following the trail of the thread.; "Princess Duck" – Little Bear and his friends try out some costumes for dress-up. Duck imagines herself as a princess and they all have a parade.; "Little Bear Meets Duck" – Little Bear and Duck reminisce the time when they first met. The duck was with a group of hen chicks and Little Bear taught her how to quack and how to fly.
| 37 | 11 | "Mother Nature" | Story by : Else Holmelund Minarik; Teleplay by : Betty Quan | November 5, 1997 |
| 37 | 11 | "Dance Steps" | James Still | November 5, 1997 |
| 37 | 11 | "Who Am I?" | Suzanne Collins | November 5, 1997 |
"Mother Nature" – Little Bear and Emily collect some interesting small plants from the forest. Mother Bear shows them the wonders of nature.; "Dance Steps" – Little Bear and his friends and family wait eagerly for New Year's. They all spend most of the time dancing. By midnight Little Bear and his friends are awake to see the new year, while the grownups fall asleep.; "Who Am I?" – Little Bear and his friends play "Who Am I", giving impressions of Father Bear, No Feet, Moose and Lucy. Emily's Owl's impression makes Owl feel left out until Little Bear coaxes him.
| 38 | 12 | "Emily's Birthday" | Story by : Else Holmelund Minarik; Teleplay by : James Still | November 11, 1997 |
| 38 | 12 | "The Great Race" | Jeff Stockwell | November 11, 1997 |
| 38 | 12 | "Circus for Tutu" | Betty Quan | November 11, 1997 |
"Emily's Birthday" – Today is Emily's 7th birthday, and Little Bear and his friends come to celebrate at Granny's house. Little Bear is a bit worried about Emily growing up.; "The Great Race" – Little Bear starts up a great race with his friends. Frog gets caught in the excitement. Then Moose also joins the race. At the finish point, Frog wins the race.; "Circus for Tutu" – Little Bear and his friends start up a circus especially for Tutu. Then, the otters come and become the circus clowns.
| 39 | 13 | "Clever Cricket" | Story by : Else Holmelund Minarik; Teleplay by : Michael Thoma | November 17, 1997 |
| 39 | 13 | "Leaves" | Jeff Stockwell | November 17, 1997 |
| 39 | 13 | "Big Bad Broom" | Story by : Else Holmelund Minarik; Teleplay by : Suzanne Collins | November 17, 1997 |
"Clever Cricket" – Tutu brings a piece of firewood inhabited by a cricket. Granny names him Clever Cricket and he decides to settle in the house.; "Leaves" – Little Bear starts collecting leaves and helps Grandmother Bear bake a pie. During his afternoon nap waiting for the pie to be ready, he dreams of his mother as a child. When he wakes up, he finds Mother Bear's missing maple leaf charm.; "Big Bad Broom" – Little Bear cleans up the garden shed, while Grandfather Bear takes a nap. All this time a leaning broom is causing trouble and help for Little Bear, but he manages to clear the shed.

=== Season 4 (1999) ===
Note: All episodes in this season were directed by Charles E. Bastien, except for episode 52, which was directed by Raymond Jafelice.

| No. overall | No. in season | Title | Written by | Original release date |
|---|---|---|---|---|
| 40 | 1 | "Moonlight Serenade" | Michael Thoma | January 4, 1999 |
| 40 | 1 | "Caterpillars" | Suzanne Collins | January 4, 1999 |
| 40 | 1 | "Goblin Night" | Suzanne Collins | January 4, 1999 |
"Moonlight Serenade" – Tonight a harvest moon is in the sky. In a dream, Little Bear dances with the scarecrow under the moon, accompanied by mice, pumpkins, a rake and a shovel.; "Caterpillars" – Little Bear, Duck and No Feet take caterpillars out of Mother Bear's vegetable patch into some grassland. The next day, the caterpillars have turned into butterflies.; "Goblin Night" – On Goblin Night (Halloween), Little Bear, Cat, Owl, Duck and Mitzi dress as scary monsters and then join Mother Bear, Father Bear and other animals for the bonfire.
| 41 | 2 | "Little Bear and the Sea Monster" | Michael Thoma | January 4, 1999 |
| 41 | 2 | "Hat Parade" | Story by : Else Holmelund Minarik; Teleplay by : Michael Thoma | January 4, 1999 |
| 41 | 2 | "Finding Fisherman Bear" | Suzanne Collins | January 4, 1999 |
"Little Bear and the Sea Monster" – A fog covers the sea as Little Bear fishes with Owl. They are encountered by a giant sea dragon. A mermaid assists Little Bear to get his fishing hook out of the creature's mouth.; "Hat Parade" – Little Bears finds a box of hats and tries on several different hats with Emily. Later they give their friends a hat parade and head to Little Bear's house for some cake.; "Finding Fisherman Bear" – Little Bear sifts around his messy bedroom looking for Fisherman Bear. He finds nothing even after tidying up. The last place he looks is under the bedsheets.
| 42 | 3 | "Pillow Hill" | James Still | January 5, 1999 |
| 42 | 3 | "Diva Hen" | James Still | January 5, 1999 |
| 42 | 3 | "Father Bear's Little Helper" | Michael Thoma | January 5, 1999 |
"Pillow Hill" – Little Bear is sick in bed. Father Bear keeps Little Bear content and Mother Bear holds a picnic in the bedroom. At bedtime Little Bear dreams of being the giant of Pillow Hill.; "Diva Hen" – Hen tries to sing opera, but has pitch problems. Little Bear encourages her to perform in front of their friends.; "Father Bear's Little Helper" – Father Bear is so busy in the garden he can't go fishing, so Little Bear helps out by digging a new patch for Mother Bear's tomato plants.
| 43 | 4 | "I'll Be You You'll Be Me" | James Still | January 7, 1999 |
| 43 | 4 | "Frog in My Throat" | Betty Quan | January 7, 1999 |
| 43 | 4 | "The Puddle Jumper" | Michael Thoma | January 7, 1999 |
"I'll Be You You'll Be Me" – Little Bear pretends to be Duck and vice versa. Duck thinks it's her birthday. Then Hen and Cat swap personalities. Soon everyone becomes themselves.; "Frog in My Throat" – As Little Bear tries to yodel, he develops laryngitis. He takes the expression 'frog in my throat' literally. When he gets home, Mother Bear provides the cure.; "The Puddle Jumper" – Little Bear jumps over some puddles, spoiling Duck's favorite one. Frog takes them to a large puddle. Little Bear makes the jump and is proclaimed the great Puddle Jumper.
| 44 | 5 | "Family Bath Time" | Betty Quan | January 11, 1999 |
| 44 | 5 | "Winter Wonderland" | Y York | January 11, 1999 |
| 44 | 5 | "Mitzi's Mess" | Suzanne Collins | January 11, 1999 |
"Family Bath Time" – Father Bear is busy taking a bath. Little Bear joins him and they have fun and get cleaned up. Then, Father Bear, has Mother Bear get inside the bathtub.; "Winter Wonderland" – Little Bear is eager to play in the coming winter. In a dream, Little Bear dances, makes music, has a snowball fight, goes tobogganing and ice skating.; "Mitzi's Mess" – It all starts with Mitzi flying Little Bear's airplane in the house. Mitzi, Owl and Little Bear manage to make more of a mess and they barely hide it from Mother Bear.
| 45 | 6 | "Sleep Over" | James Still | January 13, 1999 |
| 45 | 6 | "Sandcastles" | Y York | January 13, 1999 |
| 45 | 6 | "Happy Anniversary" | Betty Quan | January 13, 1999 |
"Sleep Over" – Duck and Owl come to Little Bear's house for a sleepover. Throughout the night they play games and Father Bear tells them a scary fairytale.; "Sandcastles" – On a relaxing day at the lake, Little Bear builds a sandcastle. Duck, the Otters and Owl join in Little Bear's royal game. Soon they play a game of flattening the castle.; "Happy Anniversary" – Today is Mother and Father Bear's anniversary. Even without Father Bear, Little Bear throws a party for their anniversary. Father Bear turns up later as a surprise.
| 46 | 7 | "The April Fool" | James Still | January 19, 1999 |
| 46 | 7 | "Balloon Heads" | Betty Quan | January 19, 1999 |
| 46 | 7 | "Mother Bear's Button" | Michael Thoma | January 19, 1999 |
"The April Fool" – On April Fools Day, Little Bear tries to trick his parents which don't seem to work, until he gets a little flustered.; "Balloon Heads" – Little Bear shares with the otters and Owl some bubble gum. The otters wind up chasing Owl to burst his large gum balloon and he ends sticky with gum.; "Mother Bear's Button" – While taking a walk, Mother Bear drops one of her dress buttons. Little Bear and Duck look and find a beetle that has the button, using it as an umbrella.
| 47 | 8 | "Little Bear and the Ice Boat" | Michael Thoma | January 21, 1999 |
| 47 | 8 | "Baby Deer" | Suzanne Collins | January 21, 1999 |
| 47 | 8 | "Invisible Little Bear" | Michael Thoma | January 21, 1999 |
"Little Bear and the Ice Boat" – Today is Grandfather Bear's birthday. Little Bear helps Grandfather make an ice boat as a present. When they finish they try it out at the ice lake.; "Baby Deer" – Little Bear finds a lost fawn and takes care of her at home. The fawn is playful and excited. Little Bear and his parents shortly return her to her own family.; "Invisible Little Bear" – Little Bear plays a game with his friends of being invisible, but it doesn't quite fit in hide and seek. Little Bear then gets bored of the game.
| 48 | 9 | "Blue Feather" "Little Bear Meets Blue Feather" | Story by : Else Holmelund Minarik; Teleplay by : Y York | January 25, 1999 |
| 48 | 9 | "Thunder Monster" | James Still | January 25, 1999 |
| 48 | 9 | "Duck Soup" | Betty Quan | January 25, 1999 |
"Blue Feather" – Little Bear meets a bear cub and his brother Big Bear. Big Bear is training his baby brother's sense of smell with a blue feather. Blue Feather then becomes the cub's name.; "Thunder Monster" – The weather becomes rainy with a thunderstorm. Little Bear imagines it as a monster. Eventually, the storm passes.; "Duck Soup" – Little Bear and his friends play a game where Duck gets to be the soup for Mitzi's monster. In the soup, they add mostly Duck's favorite foods.
| 49 | 10 | "Little White Skunk" | Story by : Else Holmelund Minarik; Teleplay by : James Still | January 27, 1999 |
| 49 | 10 | "Mother's Day" | Suzanne Collins | January 27, 1999 |
| 49 | 10 | "Little Footprint" | Story by : Else Holmelund Minarik; Teleplay by : James Still | January 27, 1999 |
"Little White Skunk" – A skunk family has lost their baby. Owl and Little Bear find a lost white baby skunk, but soon discover that the skunks' baby is actually a rabbit.; "Mother's Day" – Today is Mother's Day. While Little Bear picks flowers he helps a distressed rabbit to show him his mother still loves him. Then Little Bear takes flowers to his own mother.; "Little Footprint" – Today is a light snowfall. Little Bear, Duck, Owl and Cat follow a set of small footprints to Marshmallow. They all play together and go to Little Bear's house for hot chocolate and a nap.
| 50 | 11 | "Valentines Day" | Story by : Else Holmelund Minarik; Teleplay by : Suzanne Collins | February 1, 1999 |
| 50 | 11 | "Thinking of Mother Bear" | Betty Quan | February 1, 1999 |
| 50 | 11 | "I Spy" | Betty Quan | February 1, 1999 |
"Valentines Day" – Little Bear receives an anonymous Valentine card. As he delivers letters to his friends he soon finds out his secret admirer is his own mother.; "Thinking of Mother Bear" – Little Bear draws some pictures for Mother Bear. After he shows them to her, she shows him his birthday cake.; "I Spy" – Little Bear and his friends play a game of I Spy. Later No Feet joins in. Cat makes some tricky things to spy and find.
| 51 | 12 | "Rainy Day Friends" | Michael Thoma | February 3, 1999 |
| 51 | 12 | "Little Goblin Bear" | Story by : Else Holmelund Minarik; Teleplay by : James Still | February 3, 1999 |
| 51 | 12 | "Picnic on the Moon" | Betty Quan | February 3, 1999 |
"Rainy Day Friends" – On a rainy day, Little Bear plays with Grandfather Bear's old toys in the attic. He imagines himself and the toys taking a great journey on the train.; "Little Goblin Bear" – Emily makes for Little Bear a goblin costume. During a game of tag, Little Bear meets a real goblin who takes Lucy for himself but later gives her back to Emily.; "Picnic on the Moon" – Little Bear imagines himself having a picnic on the moon and invites his friends over wearing their own space helmets.
| 52 | 13 | "The Painting" | Story by : Else Holmelund Minarik; Teleplay by : James Still | February 12, 1999 |
| 52 | 13 | "The Kiss" | Story by : Else Holmelund Minarik; Teleplay by : James Still | February 12, 1999 |
| 52 | 13 | "The Wedding" | Story by : Else Holmelund Minarik; Teleplay by : James Still | February 12, 1999 |
"The Painting" – Mr. Skunk is upset that no one loves him. Little Bear paints a picture and asks Mr. Skunk to take it to Mother Bear. Mr. Skunk is touched and happy when Mother Bear kisses him.; "The Kiss" – Mr. Skunk kisses Duck to pass it to Little Bear. Soon a kissing tag ensues and Mr. Skunk meets and engages with a lady skunk.; "The Wedding" – Today, Mr. Skunk is to be wed to Ms. Skunk and all Little Bear's friends and relatives are invited. Some of Ms. Skunk's musk causes a stir, but the couple is finally married.; Note: This episode in whole is also known as "A Kiss for Little Bear".

=== Season 5 (2000–01) ===
| No. overall | No. in season | Title | Directed by | Written by | Original release date |
|---|---|---|---|---|---|
| 53 | 1 | "Duck Loses Her Quack" | Daniel Poitras | Jennifer Pertsch | February 21, 2000 |
| 53 | 1 | "Feathers in a Bunch" | Daniel Poitras | Joseph Mallozzi | February 21, 2000 |
| 53 | 1 | "Detective Little Bear" | Daniel Poitras | Betty Quan | February 21, 2000 |
"Duck Loses Her Quack" – As Duck tries to teach the ducklings how to quack, she loses her own. Wherever they look, the ducklings pick up other noises. Duck finds her quack when Little Bear tries.; "Feathers in a Bunch" – Little Bear goes to play with Owl, but he's grumpy and busy just like Father Bear. Little Bear and Duck start up an act to make Owl laugh.; "Detective Little Bear" – Grandfather Bear has lost his pocket watch. Little Bear sums up some clues to conclude a goblin took it, but at lunch he finds it hidden in a loaf of bread.
| 54 | 2 | "The Sky Is Falling" | Daniel Poitras | Jennifer Pertsch | July 3, 2000 |
| 54 | 2 | "Father's Day" | Daniel Poitras | Clive Endersby | July 3, 2000 |
| 54 | 2 | "Fisherman Bear's Big Catch" | Daniel Poitras | Betty Quan | July 3, 2000 |
"The Sky Is Falling" – On a windy day in Mother Bear's garden, Little Bear tells a poem about flying.; "Father's Day" – Little Bear's fishing trip with Father Bear ends up being a time with all his friends too.; "Fisherman Bear's Big Catch" – An octopus takes Fisherman Bear from Little Bear. With Mermaid's help, Little Bear retrieves him from the Octopus' tea party and finds him a new friend.
| 55 | 3 | "The Dandelion Wish" | Daniel Poitras | Jed MacKay | July 10, 2000 |
| 55 | 3 | "The Broken Boat" | Daniel Poitras | Nancy Barr | July 10, 2000 |
| 55 | 3 | "Duck Takes the Cake" | Daniel Poitras | Betty Quan | July 10, 2000 |
"The Dandelion Wish" – Little Bear tries hard to catch a dandelion fluff to make a wish. Duck and Cat assist him hoping for a share of the wish until they all run into a field of dandelions.; "The Broken Boat" – As Mother Bear prepares the table for Harvest Day, Little Bear breaks her gravy boat. Little Bear's friends try to fix it, but Father Bear has the answer.; "Duck Takes the Cake" – Hen has so much to do, that Duck helps her for the tea party. Duck takes Hen's requests too literally. He still manages to start the tea party.
| 56 | 4 | "Little Bear Talks to Himself" | Daniel Poitras | Story by : Else Holmelund Minarik; Teleplay by : Jed MacKay | July 17, 2000 |
| 56 | 4 | "Who Do I Look Like?" | Daniel Poitras | Rhonda Smiley | July 17, 2000 |
| 56 | 4 | "Mister Nobody" | Daniel Poitras | Nancy Barr | July 17, 2000 |
"Little Bear Talks to Himself" – Finding nobody at home and lacking company, Little Bear begins talking to himself, to the great astonishment of his friends. When he finds them hiding in a bush he rejoins them.; "Who Do I Look Like?" – Little Bear sees some resemblances in himself to his parents and grandparents when they tell him he is in some ways like them.; "Mister Nobody" – Little Bear's parents have lost their belongings and imagine Mr. Nobody is behind this. Little Bear is in fact that imaginary mischief-maker.; Note: On DirecTV and other cable systems, "Little Bear Talks to Himself" was the third story and "Mister Nobody" was the first story. But for real, "Little Bear Talks to Himself" was the first story, and "Mister Nobody" was the third story. They never fixed it.
| 57 | 5 | "I Can Do That" | Daniel Poitras | Betty Quan | July 24, 2000 |
| 57 | 5 | "Pied Piper Little Bear" | Daniel Poitras | Thomas LaPierre | July 24, 2000 |
| 57 | 5 | "The Big Swing" | Daniel Poitras | Rhonda Smiley | July 24, 2000 |
"I Can Do That" – Little Bear mimics the actions of other animals, exchanging a lot of imitations with No Feet.; "Pied Piper Little Bear" – Little Bear practices playing the flute being taught a lesson by Grandfather Bear. The music gets the attention of some mice in the attic and Little Bear and Grandfather Bear lead out into the forest.; "The Big Swing" – Little Bear and Emily play on a swing then switch to playing Princess, before returning to the swing by nightfall.; Note: On DirecTV and other cable systems, "I Can Do That" was the third story, "Pied Piper Little Bear" was the first story, and "The Big Swing" was the second story. But for real, "I Can Do That" was the first story, "Pied Piper Little Bear" was the second story, and "The Big Swing" was the third story. They never fixed it.
| 58 | 6 | "The Greatest Show in the World" | Daniel Poitras | Clive Endersby | September 11, 2000 |
| 58 | 6 | "Lucky Little Bear" | Daniel Poitras | Jed MacKay | September 11, 2000 |
| 58 | 6 | "Little Bear's Tall Tale" | Daniel Poitras | Nancy Barr | September 11, 2000 |
"The Greatest Show in the World" – Little Bear and friends perform a circus act in the forest.; "Lucky Little Bear" – Little Bear, Duck, Owl and Cat attempt to find Little Bear's lost lucky clover. Later he realizes that his luck isn't within a clover, but is in the friendships he shares.; "Little Bear's Tall Tale" – During a camping trip, everyone takes turns adding onto Little Bear's scary story about a monster.; Note: On DirecTV and other cable systems, "The Greatest Show in the World" was the second story, and "Lucky Little Bear" was the first story. But for real, "The Greatest Show in the World" was the first story, and "Lucky Little Bear" was the second story. They never fixed it.
| 59 | 7 | "Little Bear Scares Everyone" | Daniel Poitras | Story by : Else Holmelund Minarik; Teleplay by : Jennifer Pertsch | September 11, 2000 |
| 59 | 7 | "The One that Got Away" | Daniel Poitras | Michael Thoma | September 11, 2000 |
| 59 | 7 | "Where Are Little Bear's Crayons?" | Daniel Poitras | Story by : Else Holmelund Minarik; Teleplay by : Nancy Barr | September 11, 2000 |
"Little Bear Scares Everyone" – Little Bear makes himself a leafy mask. With it, he scares his friends. Little Bear then makes a crown for Mother Bear.; "The One that Got Away" – Little Bear tries to catch a large fish, which gets away. He visits Captain Buckle's pirate ship and the Mermaid gives him a conch to call the fish.; "Where Are Little Bear's Crayons?" – Little Bear is looking for his crayons to draw the sunset. By the time he finds all his crayons, the night has come.
| 60 | 8 | "Magic Lemonade" | Daniel Poitras | Nancy Barr | November 20, 2000 |
| 60 | 8 | "Silly Billy" | Daniel Poitras | Betty Quan | November 20, 2000 |
| 60 | 8 | "Goodnight, Little Bear" | Daniel Poitras | Jennifer Pertsch | November 20, 2000 |
"Magic Lemonade" – Little Bear makes some sour lemonade which he imagines is magic. His friends feel better from the heat after drinking the lemonade.; "Silly Billy" – Little Bear tries to get Father Bear to stay in a perfect posture for his picture, but Father Bear is in a silly mood. Still Little Bear gets his picture done.; "Goodnight, Little Bear" – It's bedtime, but Little Bear wants to ensure he stays awake. After some excitement, Little Bear and his parents finally get tired enough to go to bed.; Note: On DirecTV and other cable systems, "Silly Billy" was the third story, and "Goodnight, Little Bear" was the second story. But for real, "Silly Billy" was the second story, and "Goodnight, Little Bear" was the third story. They never fixed it.
| 61 | 9 | "First Frost" | Daniel Poitras | Graham Whitehead | November 27, 2000 |
| 61 | 9 | "Hello Snow" | Daniel Poitras | Clive Endersby | November 27, 2000 |
| 61 | 9 | "Duck and the Winter Moon" | Daniel Poitras | Story by : Else Holmelund Minarik; Teleplay by : Betty Quan | November 27, 2000 |
"First Frost" – While assisting Mother and Father Bear with their chores, Little Bear anticipates the winter arrival of "Old Frost".; "Hello Snow" – Little Bear, Duck, Owl and Cat dream of winter's arrival, and sing to the clouds to make the snow fall.; "Duck and the Winter Moon" – Little Bear and Duck set off into the night sky to inform the moon that its brightness is keeping them awake.
| 62 | 10 | "Opposites Day" | Daniel Poitras | Thomas LaPierre | May 29, 2001 |
| 62 | 10 | "Wish upon a Star" | Daniel Poitras | Rhonda Smiley | May 29, 2001 |
| 62 | 10 | "Sleepy Head Monster" | Daniel Poitras | Betty Quan | May 29, 2001 |
"Opposites Day" – When Little Bear wakes up on the wrong side of the bed, he decides to do impractical opposite things. Little Bear's friends quickly get the idea and play along.; "Wish upon a Star" – As Little Bear waits for the moon to come, he and Mother Bear wish upon the evening star. Little Bear finally sees the moon during his bedtime.; "Sleepy Head Monster" – This morning Little Bear doesn't get up at first, but then he pretends he is the Sleepy Head Monster. When his parents play the game they get tired and fall asleep in Little Bear's bed.; Note: On DirecTV and other cable systems, "Opposites Day" was the third story, "Wish upon a Star" was the first story, and "Sleepy Head Monster" was the second story. But for real, "Opposites Day" was the first story, "Wish upon a Star" was the second story, and "Sleepy Head Monster" was the third story. They never fixed it.
| 63 | 11 | "Little Bear's Favorite Tree" | Daniel Poitras | Betty Quan | May 30, 2001 |
| 63 | 11 | "Something Old Something New" | Daniel Poitras | Jennifer Pertsch | May 30, 2001 |
| 63 | 11 | "In a Little While" | Daniel Poitras | Nancy Barr | May 30, 2001 |
"Little Bear's Favorite Tree" – Little Bear spends some time with his favorite oak tree. Some Blue Jays settle on it. By autumn the tree is blown down.; "Something Old Something New" – Little Bear, Emily, Duck and the ducklings look for special things for Lucy and Fisherman Bear's wedding.; "In a Little While" – Father Bear and Mother Bear are pretty busy and Little Bear gets tired of waiting. Eventually Little Bear teaches Father Bear what it is to be patient.; Note: On DirecTV and other cable systems, "Little Bear's Favorite Tree" was the third story, "Something Old Something New" was the first story, and "In a Little While" was the second story. But for real, "Little Bear's Favorite Tree" was the first story, "Something Old Something New" was the second story, and "In a Little While" was the third story. They never fixed it.
| 64 | 12 | "We're Lost" | Daniel Poitras | Rhonda Smiley | May 31, 2001 |
| 64 | 12 | "Little Little Bear" | Daniel Poitras | Graham Whitehead | May 31, 2001 |
| 64 | 12 | "Duck's Big Catch" | Daniel Poitras | Jed MacKay | May 31, 2001 |
"We're Lost" – On a hot day, Little Bear imagines himself and Duck lost from the North Pole. After a lot of fun in the snow, they go back to the warmer summer outside their imagination.; "Little Little Bear" – Little Bear meets a young raccoon who mimics his actions, getting the name Little Little Bear. Together they play games until the raccoon family arrives.; "Duck's Big Catch" – Having caught nothing, Little Bear, Owl and Duck sail out on the lake. In the middle of a storm, a whale swallows them and they escape out of the blowhole.
| 65 | 13 | "How to Love a Porcupine" | Daniel Poitras | Story by : Else Holmelund Minarik; Teleplay by : Betty Quan | June 1, 2001 |
| 65 | 13 | "A Houseboat for Duck" | Daniel Poitras | Story by : Else Holmelund Minarik; Teleplay by : Jennifer Pertsch | June 1, 2001 |
| 65 | 13 | "How Little Bear Met Owl" | Daniel Poitras | Story by : Else Holmelund Minarik; Teleplay by : Jennifer Pertsch | June 1, 2001 |
"How to Love a Porcupine" – Little Bear and Duck play with a porcupine all the while trying not to get pricked by her quills, but the porcupine finds another one to play with.; "A Houseboat for Duck" – With so many frogs keeping Duck awake late at night, Little Bear makes her a houseboat. Duck doesn't like the houseboat, but all the frogs do.; "How Little Bear Met Owl" – Little Bear tells his parents a bedtime story about the first time he met Owl when he was looking at the moon and they shared their interests in the nighttime.; Note: On DirecTV and other cable systems, "A Houseboat for Duck" was the third story, and "How Little Bear Met Owl" was the second story. But for real, "A Houseboat for Duck" was the second story, and "How Little Bear Met Owl" was the third story. They never fixed it.
