= Nottingham, New Hampshire =

- Town
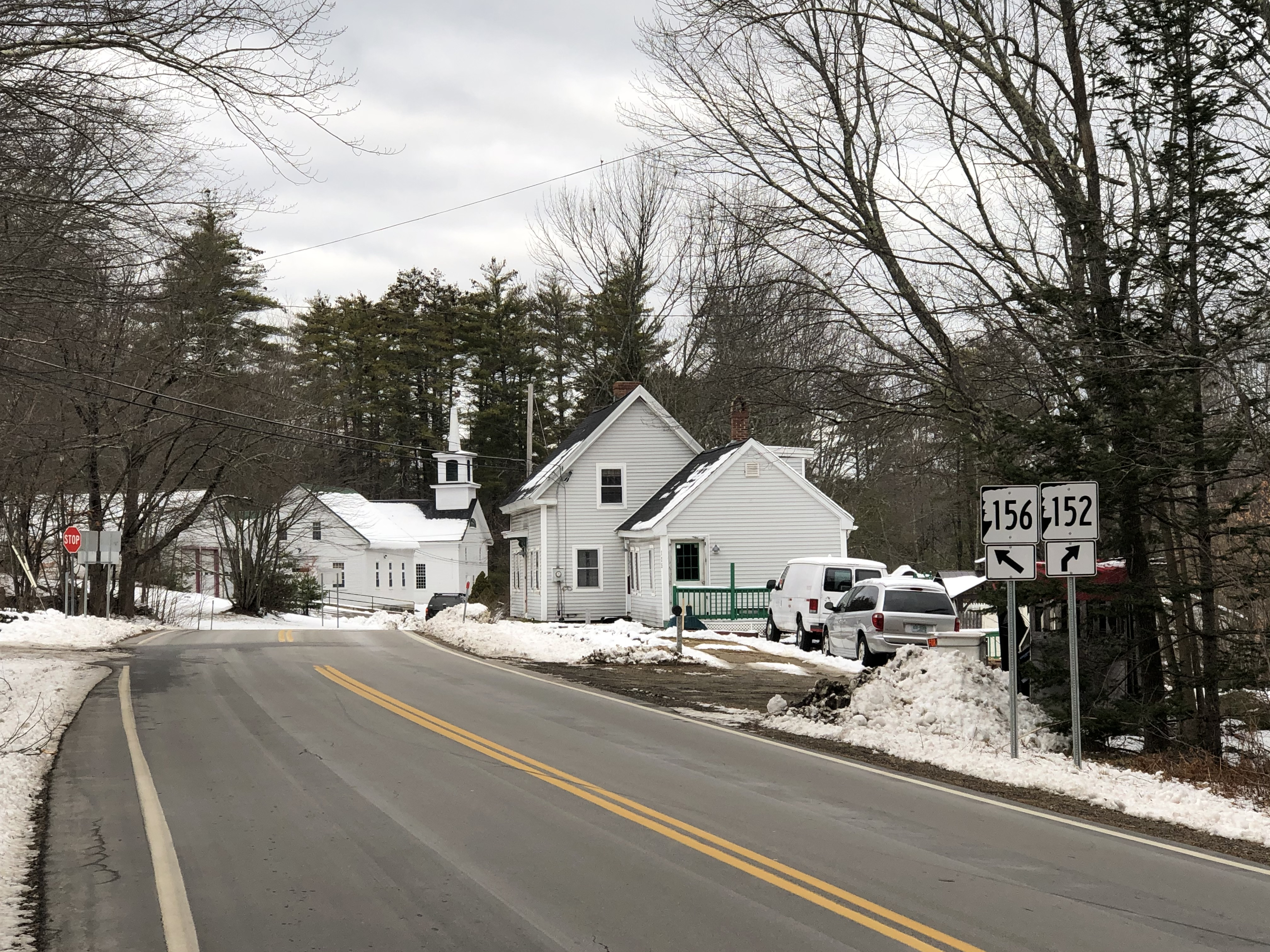
- Road junction in the village of Nottingham

- Seal

- Location in Rockingham County and the state of New Hampshire
- Coordinates: 43°06′52″N 71°05′59″W
- Country: United States
- State: New Hampshire
- County: Rockingham
- Incorporated: 1722
- Villages: Nottingham; Nottingham Square; North Nottingham; West Nottingham

Area
  - Total: 48.4 sq mi (125.4 km^{2})
  - Land: 46.5 sq mi (120.4 km^{2})
  - Water: 1.9 sq mi (5.0 km^{2}) 4.00%
- Elevation: 243 ft (74 m)

Population (2020)
  - Total: 5,229
  - Density: 112/sq mi (43.4/km^{2})
- Time zone: UTC-5 (Eastern)
  - Summer (DST): UTC-4 (Eastern)
- ZIP codes: 03290 (Nottingham); 03291 (West Nottingham)
- Area code: 603
- FIPS code: 33-57460
- GNIS feature ID: 873690
- Website: www.nottingham-nh.gov

Nottingham is a town in Rockingham County, New Hampshire, United States. The population was 5,229 at the 2020 census, up from 4,785 at the 2010 census. It is the location of Pawtuckaway State Park.

== History ==
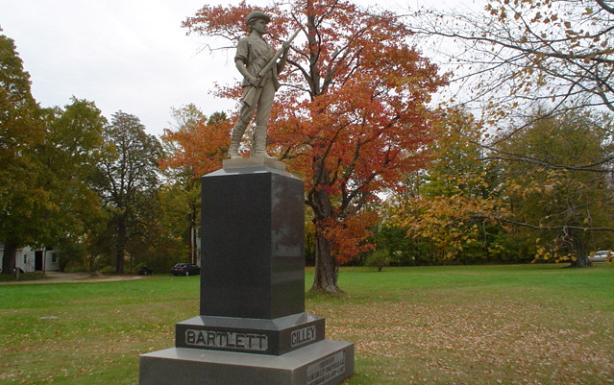
Revolutionary War monument, Nottingham Square

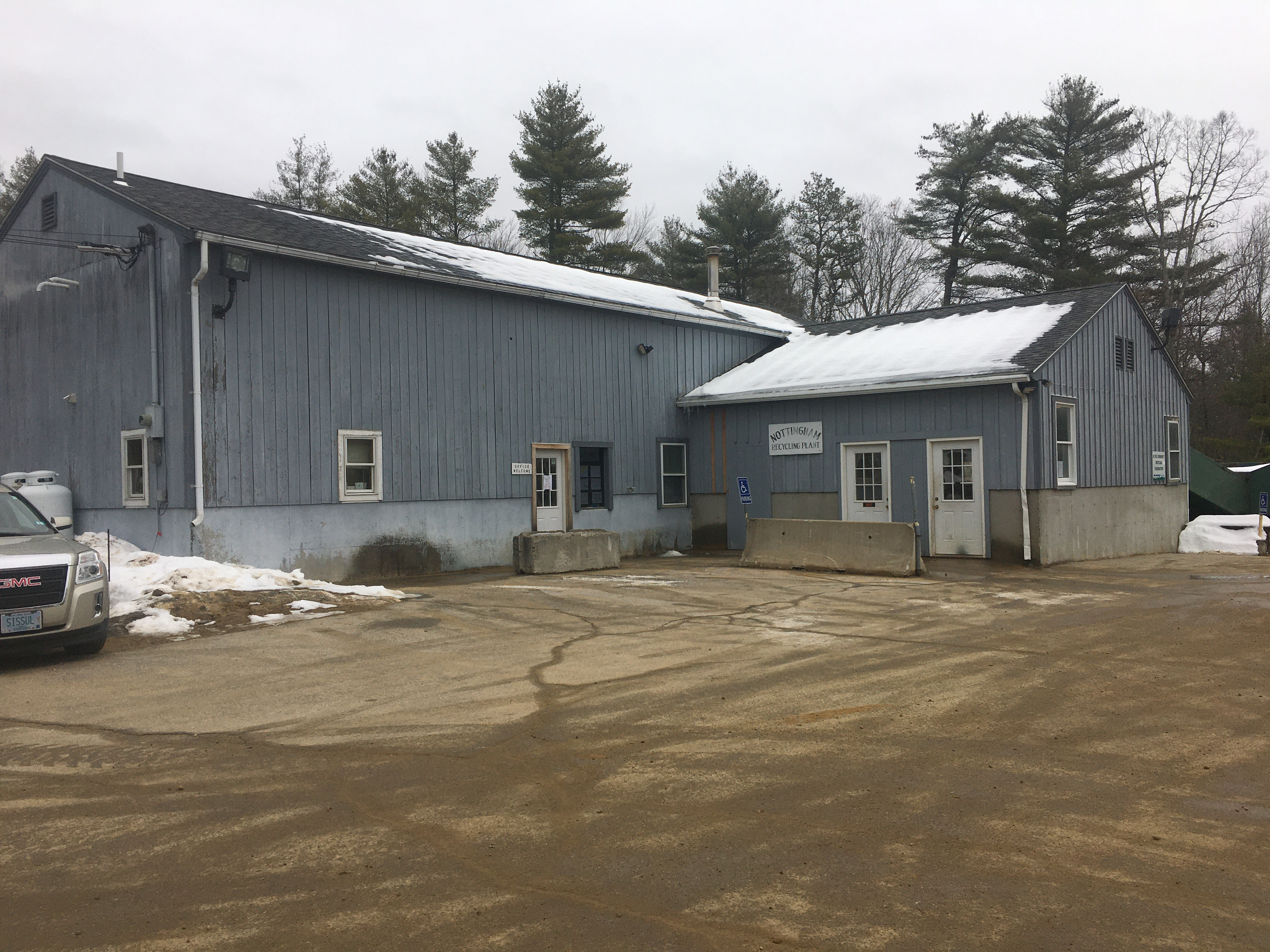
Oldest continuously operated recycling center in the US, Nottingham, NH

Incorporated in 1722 by Lieutenant Governor John Wentworth, Nottingham was named for Daniel Finch, 2nd Earl of Nottingham. The earl was a close friend of Samuel Shute and Joseph Dudley, previous colonial governors of New Hampshire. Among the grantees was Peregrine White, descendant of Peregrine White of the Mayflower, the first child of English parentage born in New England. At one time, the town had 17 watermills in operation.

The town was site of a massacre in September 1747, when Elizabeth Simpson, Robert Beard and Nathaniel Folsom were slain by Indians of the Winnipesaukee tribe.

Nottingham once included Deerfield, incorporated in 1766, and Northwood, in 1773.

Four Revolutionary War generals were from Nottingham: Joseph Cilley, Henry Dearborn, Henry Butler, and Thomas Bartlett.

Nottingham has the oldest continually operating municipal recycling center in the country, and it was the first town in the nation to make recycling mandatory. The recycling center began operation in January 1974.

== Geography ==
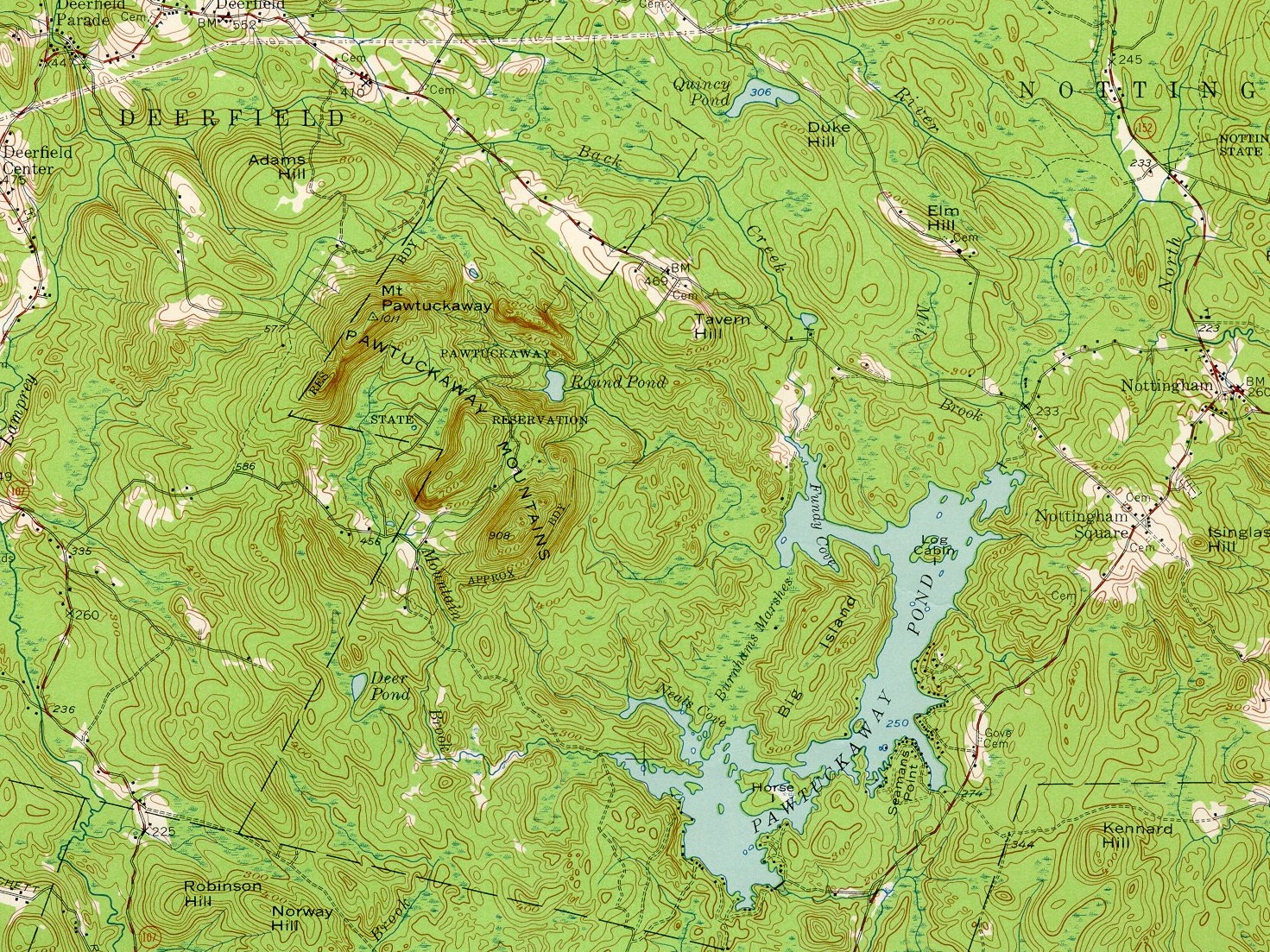
1957 topographic map, showing Pawtuckaway Lake and Pawtuckaway Mountains

According to the United States Census Bureau, the town has a total area of 48.4 square miles (125.4 km^{2}), of which 46.5 square miles (120.4 km^{2}) are land and 1.9 square miles (5.0 km^{2}) are water, comprising 4.00% of the town. Containing 14 lakes and ponds, Nottingham is drained by the Pawtuckaway, North, and Little rivers, all tributaries of the Lamprey River, which passes south and east of the town and flows into Great Bay at Newmarket. The town's highest point is the North Peak of Mount Pawtuckaway, at 995 feet (303 m) above sea level. The circular-shaped Pawtuckaway Mountains are a prime example of what geologists term a ring dike complex.

Named communities in the town include Nottingham village, Nottingham Square, North Nottingham, and West Nottingham.

=== Adjacent municipalities ===
- Barrington (northeast)
- Lee (east)
- Epping (southeast)
- Raymond (southwest)
- Deerfield (west)
- Northwood (northwest)

== Demographics ==
Historical population
Census	Pop.	Note	%±
1790	1,068		—
1800	964		−9.7%
1810	1,063		10.3%
1820	1,126		5.9%
1830	1,157		2.8%
1840	1,193		3.1%
1850	1,268		6.3%
1860	1,297		2.3%
1870	1,130		−12.9%
1880	1,095		−3.1%
1890	988		−9.8%
1900	638		−35.4%
1910	607		−4.9%
1920	520		−14.3%
1930	451		−13.3%
1940	468		3.8%
1950	566		20.9%
1960	623		10.1%
1970	952		52.8%
1980	1,952		105.0%
1990	2,939		50.6%
2000	3,701		25.9%
2010	4,785		29.3%
2020	5,229		9.3%
U.S. Decennial Census

As of the census of 2000, there were 3,701 people, 1,331 households, and 1,048 families residing in the town. The population density was 79.6 inhabitants per square mile (30.7/km^{2}). There were 1,592 housing units at an average density of 34.3 per square mile (13.2/km^{2}). The racial makeup of the town was 98.38% White, 0.19% African American, 0.19% Native American, 0.57% Asian, 0.03% Pacific Islander, 0.27% from other races, and 0.38% from two or more races. Hispanic or Latino of any race were 0.70% of the population.

There were 1,331 households, out of which 40.3% had children under the age of 18 living with them, 68.9% were married couples living together, 6.1% had a female householder with no husband present, and 21.2% were non-families. 15.0% of all households were made up of individuals, and 3.5% had someone living alone who was 65 years of age or older. The average household size was 2.78 and the average family size was 3.09.

In the town, the population was spread out, with 27.8% under the age of 18, 4.3% from 18 to 24, 33.7% from 25 to 44, 27.0% from 45 to 64, and 7.2% who were 65 years of age or older. The median age was 38 years. For every 100 females, there were 102.9 males. For every 100 females age 18 and over, there were 101.7 males.

The median income for a household in the town was $62,423, and the median income for a family was $65,510. Males had a median income of $41,182 versus $29,738 for females. The per capita income for the town was $24,879. About 0.9% of families and 2.5% of the population were below the poverty line, including 1.2% of those under age 18 and 2.3% of those age 65 or over.

== Education ==
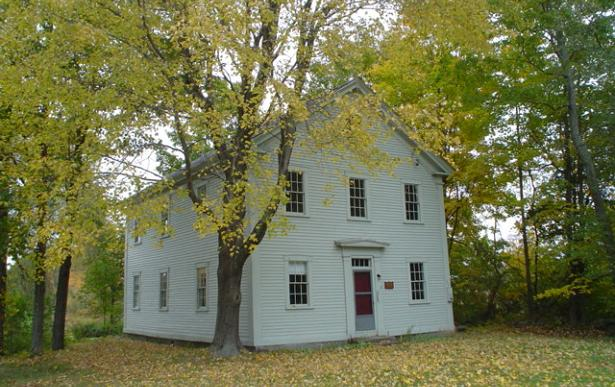
The Nottingham Square Schoolhouse museum is one of the best-preserved mid-19th century schoolhouses in southern New Hampshire.

The town of Nottingham provides kindergarten through 8th grade education at Nottingham Elementary School. The town pays tuition to Dover High School for its high school-aged students, and also has an agreement with Coe-Brown Northwood Academy in neighboring Northwood.

== Notable people ==
- Bradbury Cilley (1760–1831), U.S. congressman
- Jonathan Cilley (1802–1838), U.S. congressman
- Joseph Cilley (1734–1799), state senator, Revolutionary War general
- Joseph Cilley (1791–1887), U.S. senator from New Hampshire
- Henry Dearborn (1751–1829), U.S. congressman from Massachusetts and Revolutionary War general
- James Patrick Kelly (born 1951), science fiction author
- Else Holmelund Minarik (1920–2012), author of children's books
- Annie Bartlett Shepard (1861–1944), anti-suffragist

== Sites of interest ==
- Pawtuckaway State Park
- Square Schoolhouse – historic schoolhouse, now a museum. It is one of the best-preserved mid-19th century schoolhouses in southern New Hampshire.
- Dame School – historic meeting house, school, and now local historical museum
