= West Nottingham, New Hampshire =

Unincorporated community in New Hampshire, United States

- Unincorporated community
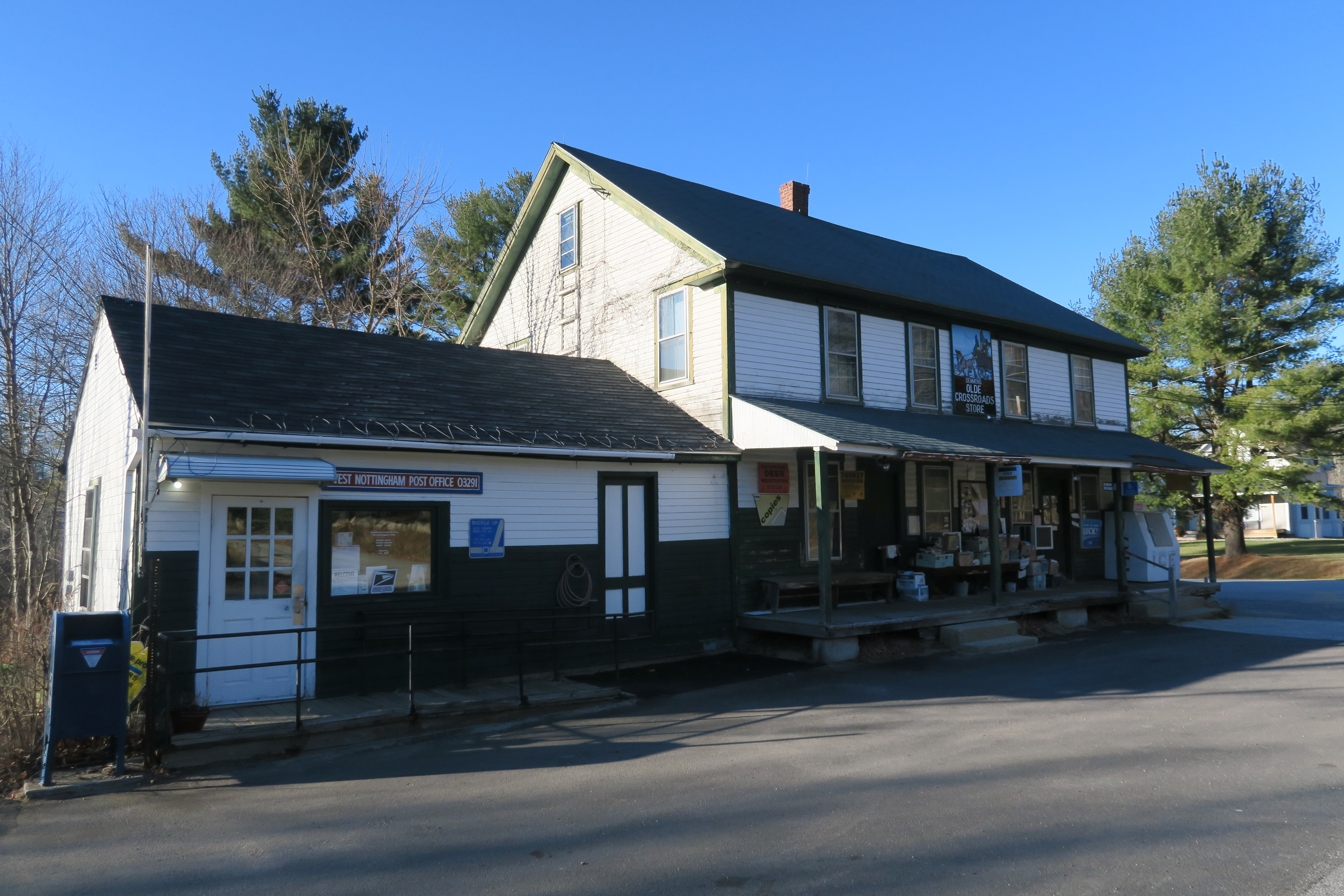
- Post Office and Olde Crossroads Store

- Location within New Hampshire Location within the United States
- Coordinates: 43°10′25″N 71°08′25″W
- Country: United States
- State: New Hampshire
- County: Rockingham
- Town: Nottingham
- Elevation: 358 ft (109 m)
- Time zone: UTC-5 (Eastern (EST))
  - Summer (DST): UTC-4 (EDT)
- ZIP code: 03291
- Area code: 603
- GNIS feature ID: 870783

West Nottingham is an unincorporated community in the town of Nottingham in Rockingham County, New Hampshire, United States. It is located along New Hampshire Route 152, 1 mile (1.6 km) south of U.S. Route 4 and 5 miles (8 km) north of the town center of Nottingham.

West Nottingham has a separate ZIP code (03291) from the rest of Nottingham.

== Notable people ==
- Homer Bigart, Pulitzer Prize winning war correspondent.
- Else Holmelund Minarik (1920–2012), author of children's books
