= Tracy Ryan (actress) =

Canadian actress (born 1971)

- Born: Tracy Leah Ryan; February 8, 1971 (age 55); Kitchener, Ontario, Canada
- Education: Cameron Heights Collegiate Institute
- Alma mater: University of Toronto (BA)
- Occupation: Actress
- Years active: 1993–present
- Known for: Family Passions; Nancy Drew; Young Drunk Punk; Little Bear
- Spouse: Bruce McCulloch (m. 2003)
- Children: 2

Tracy Ryan (born February 8, 1971) is a Canadian actress. She is best known to television audiences for her roles as Calla McDeere in Family Passions, Nancy Drew in the 1995 television series adaptation and Helen McKay in Young Drunk Punk. She also voiced Duck in Little Bear and was the English voice actress of Roll Caskett in the Mega Man Legends series.

She graduated from Cameron Heights in Kitchener, Ontario, Canada. She attended the University of Toronto and graduated with a Bachelor of Arts Degree combined major in Drama and Irish Studies in 1992.

She has been married to actor and comedian Bruce McCulloch of The Kids in the Hall since 2003, and they have two children together.

== Filmography ==
Film
Year	Film	Role	Notes
1999	Cocktailed Confusion	Girl / Sister	
2001	The Little Bear Movie	Duck	Voice role
2002	Stealing Harvard	Toy Store Salesperson	
2006	Comeback Season	Lawyer	

Television
Year	Title	Role	Notes
1993	Family Passions	Calla McDeere	Main role
1995–2001	Little Bear	Duck	Main voice role
1995	Nancy Drew	Nancy Drew	Lead role
1995	The Hardy Boys	Nancy Drew	Episodes: "The Last Laugh" and "No Dice"
1997–2000	Ned's Newt	Linda Bliss	Main voice role
1998–2000	Flying Rhino Junior High	Ruby Snarkis	Main voice role
1998	Mythic Warriors: Guardians of the Legend	Nymph #2	Voice role; episode: "Andromeda: The Warrior Princess"
1999	Tales from the Cryptkeeper	Shauna	Voice role; episode: "Sharon Sharalike"
2001	Twice in a Lifetime	Rachel Storey	Episode: "The Choice"
2001	Anne of Green Gables: The Animated Series	Belle	Episode: "Butterflies!"
2000–01	Timothy Goes to School	Doris	Main voice role; as Tracy Leah Ryan
2002	Dark Angel	Mia	Episode: "Fuhgeddaboudit"; as Tracy Leah Ryan
2003	Firefly	Petaline	Episode: "Heart of Gold"; as Tracy Leah Ryan
2010	The Kids in the Hall: Death Comes to Town	Pretty Wife	Episode: "Death Checks In"
2015	Young Drunk Punk	Helen McKay	Main role
2018	This Blows	Scarlett Mayberry	Web series; main role
2019	TallBoyz	Roxanne; Producer Thea	Episodes: "Hoop hoop hooray!" and "You Always Pick Scissors"
2022	The Kids in the Hall	Bruce's Girlfriend	Episode #1.8
2024-2025	Children Ruin Everything	Sarah	Episodes: "Ego" and "Emergencies"

Video games
Year	Title	Role	Notes
1996	Franklin Learns Math	Otter	
1998	Mega Man Legends	Roll Caskett	
1999	Little Bear Preschool Thinking Adventures	Duck	
1999	Little Bear: Kindergarten Thinking Adventures	Duck	
2000	Little Bear Toddler Discovery Adventures	Duck	
2000	Mega Man Legends 2	Roll Caskett	

== Awards and nominations ==
Year	Award	Category	Production	Result
2016	Canadian Screen Awards	Best Performance by an Actress in a Featured Supporting Role or Guest Role in a Comedic Series	Young Drunk Punk	Nominated
