= Dame School =

- U.S. National Register of Historic Places
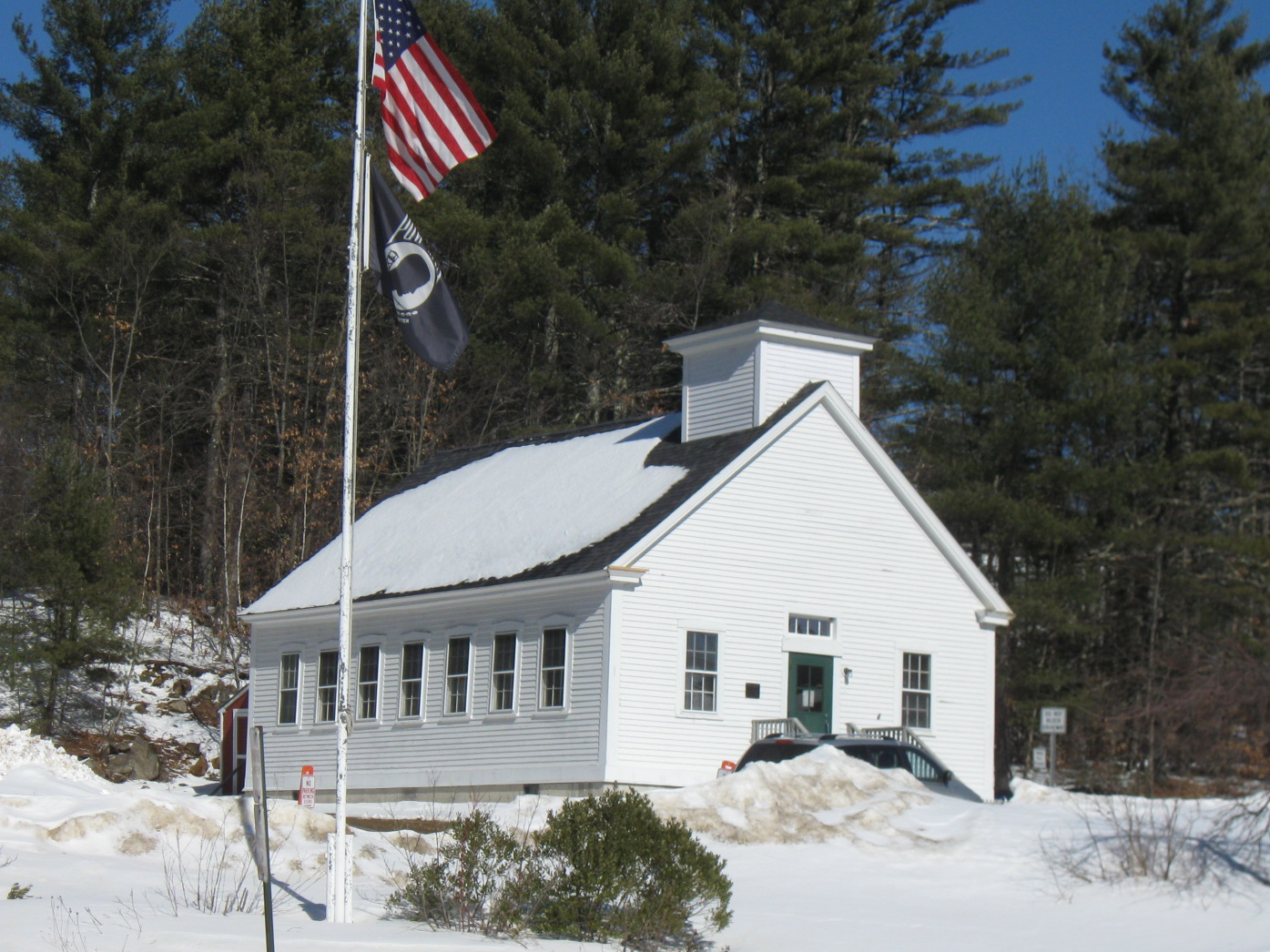

- Location within New Hampshire Location within the United States
- Location: NH 152, Nottingham, New Hampshire
- Coordinates: 43°07′12″N 71°06′09″W
- Area: 9 acres (3.6 ha)
- Built: 1840
- Architectural style: Greek Revival
- NRHP reference No.: 80000298
- Added to NRHP: October 30, 1980

The Dame School is a historic meeting house, school, and now local historical museum, on New Hampshire Route 152 in Nottingham, New Hampshire. The single story wood-frame Greek Revival structure was built in 1840 as a church; according to local legend, timbers from a 1740 church were used in its construction. Its main facade has a simple entrance topped by a transom window, and flanked by a pair of windows. The building is topped by a three-stage tower, whose second stage houses a belfry, and whose spire is topped by a weathervane in the shape of a quill pen. It was used as a meeting house until about 1878, with its dual use as a school beginning c. 1870. It was dedicated for academic use in 1878, after the local Universalist congregation which had been using for services, built its own dedicated building. This building is said to have acquired its distinctive weathervane as a gift in 1870 from schoolmaster Bartholomew Van Dame.

The building was moved closer to the center in 1952, at which time it was mounted on a concrete foundation, and a sympathetic addition was made to increase its capacity. In 1995 a new central elementary school was built, and the addition was converted for use as a police station. This building was again moved to provide parking space for the police, and has been adapted for use as a local history museum and community center.

The building was listed on the National Register of Historic Places in 1980.

== See also ==
- National Register of Historic Places listings in Rockingham County, New Hampshire
