= Arnold Black =

American violinist and composer

Arnold Black (2 May 1923 – 25 June 2000) was an American violinist and composer.

His most senior positions held include assistant concertmaster of the National Symphony Orchestra and concertmaster at the Baltimore Symphony. In his career as a composer he wrote music particularly for stage productions.

Black was notable for maintaining a musical career despite having cerebral palsy from birth. He died at his home in Massachusetts in the summer of 2000.

== Biography ==
=== Early life ===
Black was born on May 2, 1923, in the U.S. City of Philadelphia. He had cerebral palsy from birth, affecting mobility in his right side.

=== Education ===
Black studied at The Juilliard School, graduating with majors in violin and composition.

== Career ==
=== Violin ===
Black held standard violin positions in NBC Symphony and Casals Festival. He was assistant concertmaster of the Baltimore Symphony before becoming concertmaster of the National Symphony Orchestra.

==== Mohawk Trail Concerts ====
In 1969, Black helped to start the Mohawk Trail concerts. He was asked to play a Handel sonata for a Sunday service at the Federated Church in Charlemont, Massachusetts by church organist Alice Parker Pyle. This event adapted into an annual chamber music concert series. He directed the concerts for over thirty years.

=== Composer ===
In the early 1950s, Black was composer in residence at the Circle in the Square Theatre in Manhattan. He worked with director José Quintero to produce scores for various notable productions including Ulysses in Nighttown.

His concert works include a children's opera based on The Phantom Tollbooth, a novel by Norton Juster, and a piece entitled My Country, 1998–1999, commissioned by the St. Petersburg String Quartet.

He composed the soundtrack for Simple Gifts, a holiday special directed by R. O. Blechman on PBS released in 1977, including segments performed by the Renaissance group Calliope.

Black arranged the theme tune for the Canadian children's animated TV series Little Bear. The theme is based on Franz Schubert's Violin Sonata No. 1 in D Major.
