= Little Bear (TV series) =

Canadian children's animated television series

- Genre: Adventure; Fantasy
- Based on: Little Bear by Else Holmelund Minarik and Maurice Sendak
- Voices of: Kristin Fairlie; Janet-Laine Green; Dan Hennessey; Elizabeth Hanna; Tracy Ryan; Andrew Sabiston; Amos Crawley; Sean McCann; Diane D'Aquila; Jennifer Martini; Kay Hawtrey; Tara Charendoff; Ashley Taylor
- Theme music composer: Franz Schubert (Canada); Arnold Black (United States)
- Composer: Lesley Barber
- Countries of origin: Canada; China (season 5)
- Original language: English
- No. of seasons: 5
- No. of episodes: 65 (195 segments) (list of episodes)

Production
- Executive producers: Wild Things Productions: Maurice Sendak; John B. Carls; Nelvana (season 5): Michael Hirsh; Patrick Loubert; Clive A. Smith
- Producers: Michael Hirsh; Patrick Loubert; Clive A. Smith
- Running time: 24 minutes (7.5 minutes per segment)
- Production companies: Nelvana Limited; Hong Guang Animation (Suzhou) Co., Ltd. (season 5); Wild Things Productions; Nick Jr. Productions

Original release
- Network: Nick Jr. (United States); CBC Television (Canada)
- Release: November 6, 1995 – June 1, 2001

Little Bear, also known as Maurice Sendak's Little Bear, is a Canadian children's animated television series produced by Nelvana Limited in association with Wild Things Productions, the Canadian Broadcasting Corporation, and Nickelodeon It is based on the children's book series of the same name written by Else Holmelund Minarik and illustrated by Maurice Sendak. In the United States, the series premiered on Nickelodeon as part of the Nick Jr. block on November 6, 1995, and the final episode aired on June 1, 2001. The series also aired on CBS on Saturday mornings from September 16, 2000, until September 15, 2001.

Every 22-minute long episode of the series is divided into three seven-minute segments. Most segments are new stories, but some are retellings of Else Holmelund Minarik's books (both she and Sendak were "closely involved in the creative process" when developing the new stories). Production began in late 1994.

A direct-to-video feature film titled The Little Bear Movie was released in 2001.

== Premise ==
Set in the late 19th century American wilderness, Little Bear follows the title character as he goes on exciting adventures in the forest and learns new things with his friends, including Duck, Hen, Cat, Owl, and Emily. His parents are Mother Bear, who is always there when he needs her, and Father Bear, a fisherman who is often at sea.

== Episodes ==
Season	Segments	Episodes	Originally released	
Season	Segments	Episodes	First released	Last released
1	39	13	November 6, 1995	February 12, 1996
2	39	13	September 9, 1996	December 23, 1996
3	39	13	May 6, 1997	November 17, 1997
4	39	13	January 4, 1999	February 12, 1999
5	39	13	February 21, 2000	June 1, 2001

== Characters ==
=== Main ===
The main characters

- Little Bear (voiced by Kristin Fairlie) is a 6-year-old small, friendly, smart, curious, and imaginative grizzly bear cub who lives in the forest with his family and friends. Throughout the series, he has grown somewhat, as his voice is slightly deeper, and he rarely takes naps. He is the only character whose parents are shown other than Duck's mother in one episode, who is a chicken, as well as Emily's parents briefly in the episode where they met. Little Bear lives in a stucco, wood, cabined, plaster and brick house. He is always kind and loves to play and explore with his friends. His catchphrase is "Hmmmm... Interesting!"
- Duck (voiced by Tracy Ryan) is a female duck with yellow feathers, an orange beak, and a long neck. Slow and smart at the same time, Duck is one who gets herself into comical situations. She lives in a nest, although in one episode, she expressed longing for a house and tried to live in a houseboat. It floated downriver filled with frogs and Duck lived happily in her nest. She loves playing "princess" and pretend. She was hatched in a nest of chicks, because "some eggs got mixed up", and Little Bear taught her to fly when she was a duckling. Although Duck never has any ducklings of her own, she is sometimes seen babysitting a group of her younger relatives. She also tends to take certain phrases literally such as "fly ball" and "take the cake".
- Cat (voiced by Andrew Sabiston) is a laidback, slothful tuxedo cat who enjoys prowling at night, playing harmless tricks on passersby and his friends, and eating. When he and his friends must get to a certain place in the woods, Cat often leads them through one of his shortcuts. He's often portrayed as the smartest of the group as he can understand most situations better than his friends. His catchphrase is "Boo!"
- Hen (voiced by Elizabeth Hanna) is a fussy, feisty hen who lives in a large chicken coop. She is classy and sophisticated, and enjoys cleanliness, though her several nieces and nephews often mess up her spotless house. However, she never turns down the opportunity for fun. Hen has also been shown to be fond of opera, but she seems to be not good at singing it.
- Owl (voiced by Amos Crawley) is a male owl who is sometimes pompous, yet very sensible. He lives in a treehouse, and can be quite serious at times. Although Owl enjoys fun games, he will only participate if the gameplay is logical and rational; reading is his main hobby.
- Emily (voiced by Jennifer Martini) is a 7-year-old human girl who is Little Bear's best friend. She carries around a doll named Lucy everywhere she goes and is very attached to her. In the summer, Emily vacations with her parents by the river near Little Bear's home. Emily eventually moves to the forest permanently and lives there with her grandmother and her dog Tutu.
- Mother Bear (voiced by Janet-Laine Green) is Little Bear's mother. She enjoys cooking and is always there to help Little Bear if he needs it. She also seems to be very tidy and does not like it when the house becomes messy.
- Father Bear (voiced by Dan Hennessey) is Little Bear's father and Mother Bear's husband. He is a fisherman and sometimes takes Little Bear out fishing. He has been to many places and likes to keep things that are old, even if they have to be thrown away. He can sometimes get grumpy and lose patience occasionally, but he still loves his family dearly.

=== Recurring ===
- No Feet (voiced by Jonathan Wilson) is a friendly green garter snake that lives in Mother Bear's garden. Little Bear gets along with him very well.
- Grandmother Bear (voiced by Diane D'Aquila) is Little Bear's maternal grandmother and Mother Bear's mother. She likes to cook and tell stories.
- Grandfather Bear (voiced by Sean McCann) is Little Bear's maternal grandfather and Mother Bear's father. He once worked at a circus with his wife and sister.
- Rusty (voiced by Dan Lett) is Father Bear's younger brother and Little Bear's uncle. He mentions that he lives in the woods and that he would prefer to live there because it is quiet and peaceful. He is a very large bear, slightly taller and huskier than Father Bear. He has a deep voice, and is only seen in a few of the Little Bear episodes. Little Bear is fascinated with Rusty's outdoor ethic, and whenever he shows up, Little Bear is tempted to emulate his rustic character.
- Granny (voiced by Kay Hawtrey) is Emily's grandmother, with whom she and her parents live with in the summer and then permanently, has traveled the world, and has many odd pieces of furniture. She is the owner of Tutu.
- Tutu (vocal effects provided by Tara Charendoff) is Emily and Granny's Chihuahua. She acts very hyper and she is the only character who speaks exclusively in animal noises. According to Emily, this is because she only speaks French, yet she can understand English.
- Mitzi (voiced by Ashley Taylor Tickell) is a mischievous, sometimes rather unthoughtful, tomboyish brown monkey, who lives in a treehouse in the forest around Little Bear's home. She feels bad after slighting somebody's feelings or misleading them. She sometimes has green or white eyes. Mitzi is the last to join the supporting cast, not appearing until the beginning of season three and making her final appearance in the season four episode "I Spy".
- Moose (voiced by Ray Landry) is an adult Eastern moose bull who sometimes helps Little Bear and his friends when they are in need.
- The Mermaid (voiced by Diane D'Aquila) is a blue-haired, fairy tale character whom Little Bear occasionally meets when he goes to the lake. She is friendly and takes Little Bear to see places underwater. Owl and Emily have also met The Mermaid.

=== Others ===
- 4 river otter siblings sporadically appear; they reside in the local river. They are frequent in episodes focusing on water activities.
- A Green Frog (voiced by George Buza) that dispenses wisdom between his meditations resides at Little Bear's favorite swimming spot, Hop Frog Pond. He is very wise, and a good friend to Little Bear.
- Little Ick (voiced by Terry McGurrin) is a baby raccoon who only appears in an episode where his mother went to visit his grandmother and dropped him off with Mother Bear. Little Bear and Little Ick form a bit of a sibling relationship together, such as Little Bear feeling left out because Mother Bear seems to be paying more attention to Little Ick. Little Ick is the baby raccoon's nickname from Little Bear because "Ick" is the only thing the baby can say.
- Marshmallow is a baby albino striped skunk who is found by Owl and Little Bear in an episode, and she plays with Duck, Little Bear, Owl, and Cat in the episode "Little Footprints". In the episode "The Wedding", she is the flower girl in Mr. and Mrs. Skunk's wedding.
- Mighty (voiced by Dan Lett) is a humpback whale who is an old friend of Father Bear's. He first appears in the episode "Whale of a Tale" where Father Bear takes Little Bear fishing. He tells Little Bear the story of how he met Mighty when he accidentally caught him in his fishing net. A storm appears and Mighty and his son, Little Whale, help pull Father Bear and Little Bear back to shore. Mighty also appears in Little Bear's dream in the episode "Fisherman Bear's Big Catch". Although he only appears in two episodes, Mighty is in the opening sequence of the show.
- Mr. Wind (voiced by Chris Wiggins) is a cloud. He is the cold, angry wind that blows down from the north.
- Cub (voiced by Kyle Fairlie) is a wild bear that lives in the woods and much tougher than Little Bear. He was raised by Poppy and Pete after his parents got separated from him. His only appearance was in The Little Bear Movie.
- Poppy (voiced by Cole Caplan) and Pete (voiced by Asa Perlman) are two foxes who raised Cub after Cub was separated from his parents. Their only appearance was in The Little Bear Movie.

== Telecast and home media ==
In Canada, Little Bear premiered on CBC Television on October 7, 1995, at 8 in the morning. Episodes continued to air on Saturdays at 8 a.m. as well as on weekday mornings during the preschool programming block CBC Playground until 2007. Corus-owned Treehouse TV aired the show from 1998 to 2010.

In the United States, the show premiered on Nickelodeon as part of the Nick Jr. block on November 6, 1995, at noon. The last new episode premiered on Nickelodeon on June 1, 2001, and the final repeat aired on December 25, 2002. The show was also aired on CBS on Saturday mornings from September 16, 2000, until September 15, 2001. Noggin aired repeats (as part of the "Nick Jr. on Noggin" block) from 2001 until 2009. Its replacement, the Nick Jr. Channel, aired repeats from 2009 until 2018.

The series has been re-aired on various foreign channels, including ABC and ABC2 (Australia), RTÉ (Ireland), TV2 (New Zealand), and CBBC and CBeebies (United Kingdom).

=== Streaming ===
On December 15, 2014, Corus Entertainment released all seasons of the show, as well as the movie, free to watch on the Official Little Bear YouTube channel.

In 2015, Little Bear was added to the Noggin app, which streams shows from the classic Noggin channel.

The show was added to Paramount+ (which was called CBS All Access at the time) in January 2021.

=== VHS ===
==== United States ====
Paramount Home Entertainment:

NOTE #1: * = Also available in Canada
NOTE #2: - = Blockbuster exclusive

- Meet Little Bear (May 13, 1997)
- Family Tales (May 13, 1997)
- Winter Tales (October 7, 1997)
- Parties & Picnics (April 7, 1998)
- Favorite Tales (1998)-
- Goodnight Little Bear (September 8, 1998)
- Friends (January 12, 1999)
- More Favorite Tales (1999)-
- Summertime Tales (June 8, 1999)
- Little Goblin Bear (August 24, 1999)
- A Kiss for Little Bear (January 11, 2000)
- Little Bear's Band (March 7, 2000)
- Favorite Tales, Volume 3 (2000)-
- Rainy Day Tales (June 6, 2000)
- Little Sherlock Bear (February 6, 2001)
- The Little Bear Movie (August 7, 2001)*
- Let's Play a Game (November 6, 2001)
- Little Artist Bear (January 29, 2002)
- Campfire Tales (May 7, 2002)
- Favorite Tales, Volume 4 (2002)-
- Snacktime Tales (August 27, 2002)
- Feel Better, Little Bear (October 7, 2003)

Reader's Digest Young Families:

- Fishing Adventures (2002)
- Friendship Tales (2002)
- Pretend Time (2002)
- Imagination Time (2002)
- Sleepy Time Tales (2003)
- Birthday Celebrations (2003)
- Stories to Grow On (2004)
- Lost and Found (2004)
- Camping Adventures (2004)
- All in the Family (2004)
- Special Days (2004)
- Let's Celebrate (2004)
- Seasonal Tales (2004)
- Outdoor Discoveries (2004)
- Not-So-Scary Stories (2004)
- Show Time (2004)
- Just Me Stories (2004)
- Game Time (2004)
- Make-Believe Adventures (2005)
- Weather Tales (2005)
- Indoor Time (2005)

==== Canada ====
Alliance Atlantis:

- The World of Little Bear (1997)
- Grandmother's House (1997)
- Seasons (1998)
- New Friends (1998)
- Meet Mitzi (1999)
- Parties and Picnics (1999)
- Tales for Rainy Days (2000)
- Exploring and Other Adventures (2000)
- Mother and Father Bear (2001)
- Mysterious Moments (2001)
- Dreams and Make Believe (2001)
- Hooray for Little Bear (2002)
- Outdoor Fun (2002)
- At Home (2003)

=== DVD ===
==== United States ====
Paramount Home Entertainment:

NOTE: * = Also available in Canada

- The Little Bear Movie (June 17, 2003)*
- Feel Better, Little Bear (October 7, 2003)
- Rainy Day Tales (June 7, 2005)
- Little Bear's Band (June 7, 2005)
- Halloween Stories (August 22, 2006)

==== Canada ====
Alliance Atlantis:

- Outdoor Fun (2002)
- Mysterious Moments (2002)
- Hooray for Little Bear (2002)
- At Home (2003)
- Dreams and Make Believe (2006)
- Mother and Father Bear (2006)
- Exploring and Other Adventures (2006)
- Seasons (2005)
- New Friends (2005)
- Parties and Picnics (2005)
- Grandmother's House (2005)
- Tales for Rainy Days (2009)
- Meet Mitzi (2009)

Treehouse TV:

- Seaside Adventures (2011)
- Winter Games (2012)
- Mother Bear's Special Day (2012)
- Father's Day (2012)
- Summer Sandcastles (2012)
- Follow the Leader (2012)
- Search for Spring (2013)
- Dress Up Time (2013)

== Film ==
In 2001, the show was adapted into a direct-to-video film, called The Little Bear Movie. It was distributed by Paramount Home Entertainment in the U.S. The film's featured song, "Great Big World", was nominated for Best Original Song at the 2001 Video Premiere Awards.

== Music ==
Austrian composer Franz Schubert's Allegro vivace from his Violin Sonata No. 1 in D Major is used as the theme tune to Little Bear (used in the Canadian broadcast of the series). A separate opening theme consisting of woodwinds, strings, harp, and piano by composer Arnold Black, was used in the American broadcast of the series. The music score in the series is composed by Lesley Barber.

== Other media ==
=== Live show ===
In Canada, Little Bear was adapted into a live theatrical show, Little Bear: Winter Tales. It originally toured across Canada in 2007 and returned in late 2009. Both tours were presented by Paquin Entertainment and produced by Koba Entertainment.

=== Video games ===
In 1999, The Learning Company developed three "edutainment" games based on the Little Bear franchise, "Rainy Day Activities", "Preschool Thinking Adventures", and “Kindergarten Thinking Adventures”. In 2000, the company developed another game, this time for a younger audience, titled "Toddler Discovery Adventures".
