= Young Drunk Punk =

Canadian television sitcom

- Genre: Sitcom
- Created by: Bruce McCulloch
- Starring: Tim Carlson; Atticus Mitchell; Bruce McCulloch; Tracy Ryan; Allie MacDonald
- Composers: Craig Northey; Jim McGrath
- Country of origin: Canada
- Original language: English
- No. of seasons: 1
- No. of episodes: 13

Production
- Executive producers: Tom Cox; Jordy Randall; Susan Canvan; Bruce McCulloch
- Production locations: Calgary, Alberta, Canada
- Running time: 30 minutes
- Production companies: SEVEN24 Films; Accent Entertainment

Original release
- Network: City
- Release: January 21 – April 22, 2015

Young Drunk Punk is a Canadian television sitcom, which debuted on City on January 21, 2015.

Created by Bruce McCulloch based on his autobiographical theatrical show of the same title, the series stars Tim Carlson as Ian McKay, a young punk rocker coming of age in Calgary, Alberta, with the series opening in 1980. The cast also includes McCulloch as Ian's father Lloyd, Tracy Ryan as his mother Helen, and Atticus Mitchell as his best friend Shinky.

The series was part of a production deal between City and CBC Television. Under the deal, the series had a second run on CBC Television in the fall of 2015, while City reciprocated by airing a second run of the CBC Television sitcom Mr. D.

In an interview with the Calgary Herald in May 2016, it was announced the show had not been picked up for a second season but McCulloch was working to find a new outlet for the series.

== Cast ==
- Bruce McCulloch as Lloyd McKay
- Tracy Ryan as Helen McKay
- Tim Carlson as Ian McKay
- Atticus Mitchell as Andrew Shinky
- Allie MacDonald as Belinda McKay

== Episodes ==
No.	Title	Directed by	Written by	Original release date
1	"Pilot"	Bruce McCulloch	Bruce McCulloch	January 21, 2015
2	"Working for Cowboy"	Bruce McCulloch	Kurt Smeaton	January 28, 2015
3	"The Van"	Bruce McCulloch	Jonathan Sobol	February 4, 2015
4	"European Style"	Ron Murphy	Scott Montgomery	February 11, 2015
5	"The Clash is Coming"	Ron Murphy	Scott Montgomery	February 18, 2015
6	"Lure a Flame"	Ron Murphy	Bruce McCulloch	February 25, 2015
7	"Ian and Shrinky Make a Movie"	Kelly Makin	Garry Campbell	March 4, 2015
8	"Yoga Show"	Kelly Makin	Bruce McCulloch	March 11, 2015
9	"First Date Funeral"	Kelly Makin	Bruce McCulloch	March 18, 2015
10	"Sound Judgement"	Kelly Makin	Garry Campbell	April 1, 2015
11	"Space Invaders"	Jonathan Sobol	Kurt Smeaton	April 8, 2015
12	"Rock of Seagulls"	Ron Murphy	Bruce McCulloch & Jason Filiatraut	April 15, 2015
13	"Vancouver"	Ron Murphy	Garry Campbell	April 22, 2015
