= Square Schoolhouse =

- U.S. National Register of Historic Places
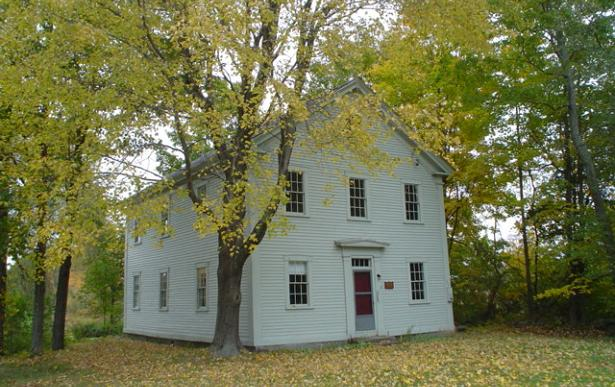

- Location within New Hampshire Location within the United States
- Location: SR 156 and Ledge Farm Rd., Nottingham, New Hampshire
- Coordinates: 43°6′11″N 71°6′34″W
- Area: 1.4 acres (0.57 ha)
- Built: 1850
- Architectural style: Greek Revival
- NRHP reference No.: 80000305
- Added to NRHP: April 17, 1980

The Square Schoolhouse is a historic schoolhouse at the junction of New Hampshire Route 156 and Ledge Hill Road in Nottingham, New Hampshire. Built about 1850, it is one of the best-preserved mid-19th century schoolhouses in southern New Hampshire. It served as a school until 1920, and is now a local museum. It was listed on the National Register of Historic Places in 1980. It is named not for its shape, but for its location in Nottingham Square.

== Description and history ==
The Square Schoolhouse stands southwest of the center of Nottingham in a rural setting, on the north side of Ledge Farm Road just southeast of its junction with New Hampshire Route 156. It is a two-story wood-frame structure, with a gabled roof and modest Greek Revival styling. Its front (gabled) facade is three bays wide, with windows topped by peaked lintels, and a center entrance framed by pilasters and a gabled pediment. The entrance opens into a vestibule area with a central staircase and cloakrooms on the sides, where many original period coathooks remain. The balance of each floor is occupied by a single classroom; that on the upper floor has a selection of student seating types dating from various periods of the school's use.

The school was built in 1850 as the first schoolhouse in the town, not long after the state circulated guidelines for the construction of such buildings. The school served the town until 1920. The schoolhouse is now owned by the Else Cilley Chapter of the Daughters of the American Revolution.

The second floor of the schoolhouse is operated as the Square Schoolhouse Museum by the Nottingham Historical Society. The museum is open by appointment.

== See also ==
- National Register of Historic Places listings in Rockingham County, New Hampshire
