= Little Bear (book series) =

Series of children's picture books written by Else Holmelund Minarik

- Author: Else Holmelund Minarik
- Illustrator: Maurice Sendak (5); David T. Wenzel (12); Chris Hahner (12); Heather Green (2); Teri Lee (2); Dorothy Doubleday (1)
- Country: United States
- Language: English
- Genre: Picture book
- Publisher: Harper & Brothers; Harper & Row; HarperFestival; HarperCollins Publishers
- Published: 1957–2010
- No. of books: 34

Little Bear is a series of children's picture books written by Else Holmelund Minarik that primarily involves Little Bear—an anthropomorphic bear cub—his mother and father, and his friends. Little Bear books have sold millions of copies and achieved multiple awards and recognitions, including a 1962 Caldecott Honor and a place on the ALA Notable Children's Books list and The New York Times Book Review's 1997 list of the best children's books of the previous fifty years.

The first book in the series, titled Little Bear, was published in 1957 by Harper and Brothers, now known as HarperCollins. It was the first entry in the I Can Read! series, a line of beginning reading books for children. Little Bear was followed by four sequels, published in 1959, 1960, 1961, and 1968. Collectively, the first five Little Bear books introduced Little Bear; his parents, Mother Bear and Father Bear; his animal friends, Cat, Duck, Hen, and Owl; Emily, a girl Little Bear meets and befriends; Little Bear's grandparents, Grandmother and Grandfather Bear; and some other friends, including two skunks.

The first five Little Bear books, illustrated by Maurice Sendak, were the basis for a TV series that culminated with a direct-to-video feature film titled The Little Bear Movie. The series was animated by the Canadian studio Nelvana and starred Kristin Fairlie as the voice of Little Bear.

From 2002 to 2004, twenty-eight new Little Bear books were published, authored by Minarik, based on episodes from the TV series, and illustrated by artists chosen by Sendak. David T. Wenzel illustrated twelve of the books, Chris Hahner illustrated another twelve, Heather Green illustrated two, and Teri Lee illustrated another two. In 2010, Minarik's final book, Little Bear and the Marco Polo, was published, featuring pictures by Dorothy Doubleday.

== Characters ==
- Little Bear: A friendly, curious, and imaginative grizzly bear cub who lives in the forest.
- Mother Bear: Little Bear's loving mother, who is always there for her son.
- Father Bear: Little Bear's father, a fisherman who is sometimes away at sea.
- Grandmother Bear: Little Bear's grandmother, a kind old bear who bakes cakes and tells stories.
- Grandfather Bear: Little Bear's grandfather, a jolly old bear who plays with his grandson and tells stories.
- Cat, Duck, Hen, and Owl: Little Bear's animal friends.
- Emily: A girl who Little Bear meets and befriends.

== Author ==
Else Holmelund Minarik had a long career in writing. She wrote many books, including her thirty-four Little Bear books. Minarik was born in Denmark in 1920, then moved to New York when she was four years old. She always loved the fairy tales written by Hans Christian Andersen, inspiring her own writing.

She studied Art and Psychology at Queens College, before working as a reporter for the Daily Sentinel of Rome, New York. Shortly thereafter, however, Minarik took up a job as a first-grade teacher on Long Island. Her teaching career, as well as her daughter, inspired her to finally write Little Bear in 1957.

Before publishing with Harper, Minarik showed Little Bear to Random House, where an editor suggested she replace the bear characters with humans. "I thought to myself, all children of all colors would be reading the stories," Minarik later reflected. "All children love animals. The bear is fine. I love them because Mother took me to the Bronx Zoo every day, and I fell in love with the cubs. My bears were a family."

Minarik died in July 2012 at the age of ninety-one, two years after the publication of Little Bear and the Marco Polo.

== Illustrators ==
Little Bear cover art from each illustrator

Maurice Sendak illustrated the first five Little Bear books. In 1964, he won a Caldecott Medal for his children's picture book, Where The Wild Things Are, becoming known for innovative children's books. He died in May 2012 at the age of eighty-three.

David T. Wenzel illustrated twelve Little Bear books, all based on episodes of the Little Bear TV series, including To Grandmother's House, The Snowball Fight, and Lucky Little Bear.

Chris Hahner illustrated twelve Little Bear books, all based on episodes of the Little Bear TV series, including Little Bear's Loose Tooth, I Miss You, Father Bear, and The Toys' Wedding.

Heather Green illustrated Little Bear's New Friend and Little Bear's Valentine, based on The Little Bear Movie and an episode of the Little Bear TV series respectively. As a painter and printmaker with a Bachelor of Fine Arts degree from the University of Arizona, she has had exhibitions in New York and Arizona.

Teri Lee illustrated Father Bear's Special Day and Mother Bear's Picnic, both based on episodes of the Little Bear TV series.

Dorothy Doubleday illustrated Little Bear and the Marco Polo, the sixth original Little Bear book, dedicating her illustrations "To my daughter Deirdre, who loved Little Bear."

== Installments ==
=== Books ===
No.	Title	Publisher	Date	Illustrator	ISBN
1	Little Bear	Harper & Brothers	1957	Maurice Sendak	9780060242404
Readers are introduced to Little Bear and his mom, Mother Bear. The reader finds out that Mother Bear knows what Little Bear needs by giving him a warm outfit, a good lunch, and plans a wonderful birthday for him. This book shows us the inner life of Little Bear, his family, and friends.
2	Father Bear Comes Home	Harper & Brothers	1959	Maurice Sendak	9780060242305
Little Bear goes on many adventures including fishing, managing the hiccups, seeking out mermaids, and welcoming his father home from being at sea.
3	Little Bear's Friend	Harper & Brothers	1960	Maurice Sendak	9780060242558
Little Bear makes a new friend with a girl named Emily and her doll, Lucy. When Emily has to leave when the summer ends, she leaves a sad Little Bear until they can come up with a solution to stay in touch.
4	Little Bear's Visit	Harper & Brothers	1961	Maurice Sendak	9780060242657
Little Bear visits his grandparents. Grandfather lets him try on his clothes, and grandmother cooks for him. Little Bear hears stories from their past and enjoys his time with them.
5	A Kiss for Little Bear	Harper & Row	1968	Maurice Sendak	9780060242985
Little Bear sends a hand drawn picture to his Grandmother, and she sends him back a kiss through his friends. The kiss goes from Hen to Cat, then to Little Skunk, and eventually to Little Bear.
6	To Grandmother's House	HarperFestival	2002	David T. Wenzel	9780694016884
Little Bear gathers delicious snacks in his wagon to take to his Grandmother's house. He meets many hungry friends while he walks along the way and learns how to share.
7	Little Bear's Loose Tooth	HarperFestival	2002	Chris Hahner	9780694017133
Little Bear has a tooth waiting to come out. His friends, Emily, Cat, Duck, and Owl, work together to help him get his tooth out so he can give it to the tooth fairy.
8	A Present for Mother Bear	HarperFestival	2002	Chris Hahner	9780694017119
Little Bear searches for the perfect present for Mother Bear's birthday. Each of his friends come up with ideas that they think is best, but Little Bear must make a good choice for Mother Bear.
9	Little Bear's New Friend	HarperFestival	2002	Heather Green	9780066238173
Little Bear goes on his first camping trip and makes a new friend: Cub. Cub lives in the woods and helps Little Bear explore his nature-filled home. They go on a wild adventure where Cub shows Little Bear things he's never seen before.
10	The Search for Spring	HarperFestival	2002	Chris Hahner	9780694017102
11	Father's Flying Flapjacks	HarperFestival	2002	David T. Wenzel	9780694016877
12	Little Bear's Scary Night	HarperFestival	2002	David T. Wenzel	9780694016853
13	Little Bear Makes a Scarecrow	HarperFestival	2002	David T. Wenzel	9780694016860
Little Bear uses a scarecrow to keep crows away from his corn, but it is blown away by wind and so he dressed up as a scarecrow himself.
14	Little Bear and the Missing Pie	HarperFestival	2002	Chris Hahner	9780694017058
Little Bear tried to solve the mystery of Father Bear's missing pie with his friends!
15	Little Bear's Valentine	HarperFestival	2002	Heather Green	9780694017126
Love is in the air as Little Bear sends valentines to all his friends and his mother. He also tries to figure out who his secret admirer is that sent him a valentine.
16	April Fools!	HarperFestival	2002	Chris Hahner	9780694016945
17	Get Well Soon, Little Bear!	HarperFestival	2002	David T. Wenzel	9780694017027
18	I Miss You, Father Bear	HarperFestival	2003	Chris Hahner	9780606290753
19	The Snowball Fight	HarperFestival	2003	David T. Wenzel	9780694016938
20	Spring Cleaning	HarperFestival	2003	David T. Wenzel	9780694016969
21	The Cricket Who Came to Dinner	HarperFestival	2003	Chris Hahner	9780694017034
22	Little Bear's Egg	HarperFestival	2003	David T. Wenzel	9780694016914
23	Father Bear's Special Day	HarperFestival	2003	Teri Lee	9780694017041
24	Mother Bear's Picnic	HarperFestival	2003	Teri Lee	9780694016921
25	Little Bear Makes a Mask	HarperFestival	2003	Chris Hahner	9780694016990
26	Little Bear's Picture	HarperFestival	2003	David T. Wenzel	9780694017010
27	Little Bear's Bad Day	HarperFestival	2003	David T. Wenzel	9780060535469
28	The Toys' Wedding	HarperFestival	2004	Chris Hahner	9780060534172
29	The Butterfly Garden	HarperFestival	2004	Chris Hahner	9780694016983
30	Lucky Little Bear	HarperFestival	2004	David T. Wenzel	9780694017003
31	Lost in Little Bear's Room	HarperFestival	2004	David T. Wenzel	9780694017065
32	Asleep Under the Stars	HarperFestival	2004	Chris Hahner	9780694016976
Among his friends, Little Bear camps out in his garden for a Spring night under the stars. He has never slept outside before so he is nervous, and quickly learns that there are many unknowns outside.
33	Emily's Birthday	HarperFestival	2004	Chris Hahner	9780694016952
34	Little Bear and the Marco Polo	HarperCollins Publishers	2010	Dorothy Doubleday	9780060854850
In the concluding book to the series, Little Bear finds his Grandfather's old captain's uniform from when he was at sea. His Grandfather then wanted to show Little Bear something more compelling: his boat.

=== Collections ===
Title	Publisher	Date	Format	Contents	Contributor	ISBN
Little Bear	HarperCollins Publishers	1992	Box set	Little Bear; Father Bear Comes Home; Little Bear's Visit	Unknown	9780064441971
Little Bear	Random House Audiobooks	1996	Audiobook	Little Bear; Little Bear's Visit	Peter Sallis (narrator)	9781860211300
In 1996, British actor Peter Sallis, best known as the voice of Wallace from the Wallace & Gromit franchise, narrated a pair of Little Bear audiobooks: Little Bear and Little Bear's Visit.
The Little Bear Treasury	HarperCollins Publishers	2003	Omnibus edition	Little Bear; Little Bear's Friend; Little Bear's Visit	Unknown	9780060273989
Adventures of Little Bear	Barnes & Noble Books	2005	Omnibus edition	Little Bear; Father Bear Comes Home; A Kiss for Little Bear	Unknown	9780760771051
Little Bear Audio Collection	HarperCollins Publishers	2007	Audiobook	Little Bear; Father Bear Comes Home; Little Bear's Friend; Little Bear's Visit; A Kiss for Little Bear	Sigourney Weaver (narrator)	9780061227431

== Reception ==
Little Bear has been recognized as an ALA Notable Children's Book and named "one of the best children's books of the previous half century" by The New York Times Book Review in 1997. Critics appreciated the "crystalline accessibility" and "evocative warmth" of Else Holmelund Minarik's prose, as well as Maurice Sendak's "Victorian-inflected" illustrations, which Anna K. Reynolds of Inspire Virtue described as "expressive and evocative," not cartoony. In 1962, Little Bear's Visit was awarded a Caldecott Honor. Margalit Fox of The New York Times described the text of Little Bear as embodying "the exquisite simplicity of a haiku poem," citing the opening lines of the first book:

It is cold.

See the snow.

See the snow come down.

Little Bear said, "Mother Bear,

I am cold.

See the snow.

I want something to put on."
