= Playhouse Disney Morning =

Disney Channel television block

- Also known as: Disney Junior Morning

Production
- Running time: 4 hours and 30 minutes

Original release
- Network: Disney Channel Middle East Disney Channel Israel
- Release: April 7, 2003 – present

Playhouse Disney Morning (Now Disney Junior Morning) is a television block that airs on Disney Channel Middle East from 3 a.m. till 6:45 a.m. GMT (6 a.m. till 9:45 a.m. KSA) but in summer from 3 a.m. till 5:50 a.m. GMT (6 a.m. till 8:50 a.m. KSA)in English, Arabic, and Swedish.

== Programming ==
- Handy Manny
- Jungle Junction
- Imagination Movers
- Doc McStuffins'
- Mickey Mouse Clubhouse
- Little Einsteins
- Higglytown Heroes
- Special Agent Oso
- Jake and the Never Land Pirates
- Art Attack

== See also ==
- Disney Channel Middle East
