= Else Holmelund Minarik =

American children's writer (1920–2012)

- Born: Else Holmelund; September 13, 1920 Fredericia, Denmark
- Died: July 12, 2012 (aged 91) Sunset Beach, North Carolina, U.S.
- Education: Queens College, City University of New York (BA)
- Years active: 1957–2010

Else Holmelund Minarik (née Holmelund; September 13, 1920 – July 12, 2012) was an American author of more than 40 children's books. She was most commonly associated with her Little Bear series of children's books, which were adapted for television. Minarik was also the author of No Fighting, No Biting!

== Biography ==
Born in Fredericia, Denmark, Minarik immigrated to the United States at the age of four with her family. As a young child in Denmark, she was introduced to the stories of Hans Christian Andersen. By 1940, Else had married Walter Minarik, who died in 1963. After graduating from Queens College, City University of New York (B.A., 1942), she became a journalist, for the Daily Sentinel newspaper of Rome, New York, during World War II. She subsequently lived on Long Island, where she was employed as a first-grade teacher for the Commack School District. Her first book, Little Bear, was borne out of her desire to write something her students could read on their own.

She later lived in West Nottingham, New Hampshire. Minarik married her second husband, Pulitzer-winning journalist Homer Bigart, in 1970; after his death in 1991, she moved to Sunset Beach in Brunswick County, North Carolina, where she continued writing longhand, as she always had.

Minarik's last book, Little Bear and the Marco Polo, was published in 2010. After having suffered a heart attack at 91, she died at home from complications, on July 12, 2012, at the age of 91

== Selected bibliography ==
- Little Bear series (all original books illustrated by Maurice Sendak, except for the last entry):
  1. Little Bear (1957)
  2. Father Bear Comes Home (1959)
  3. Little Bear's Friend (1960)
  4. Little Bear's Visit (1961)
  5. A Kiss for Little Bear (1968)
  6. Little Bear and the Marco Polo (2010) – illustrated by Dorothy Doubleday
- No Fighting, No Biting! (1958) – illustrated by Maurice Sendak
- Cat and Dog (1960) – illustrated by Fritz Siebel (published with new illustrations by Bryan Langdo in 2005)
- The Little Giant Girl and Elf Boy (1963) – illustrated by Garth Williams
- Percy and the Five Houses (1989) – illustrated by James Stevenson
