= Sappho: Memoir, Text, Selected Renderings, and a Literal Translation =

1885 book by Henry Thornton Wharton

Sappho: Memoir, Text, Selected Renderings, and a Literal Translation is an 1885 book by Henry Thornton Wharton. Wharton, an amateur classicist, translated all of the fragments of Sappho's poetry from Theodor Bergk's edition of the Greek lyric poets into English prose, and compiled these with verse translations by various authors. Wharton's edition was enormously popular and influential, going through four editions between 1885 and 1897; it influenced writers including Ezra Pound, H. D., and Mary Barnard – who went on to publish her own translation of Sappho's poetry, Sappho: A New Translation.

== Translation ==
Immortal Aphrodite of the broidered throne, daughter of Zeus, weaver of wiles, I pray thee break not my spirit with anguish and distress, O Queen.

— Henry Thornton Wharton, Ode to Aphrodite (Sappho 1), lines 1–4

Henry Thornton Wharton had studied natural sciences at Oxford University and worked as a doctor. He was also an amateur classicist, who became interested in Sappho in part due to the Sappho-inspired poetry of Algernon Charles Swinburne.

In 1885, Wharton published the first edition of his Sappho: Memoir, Text, Selected Renderings, and a Literal Translation. The book was aimed at a general audience, not just classical scholars. It includes a biography of Sappho, the Greek texts of all of the fragments of Sappho then known, literal prose translations by Wharton, and a selection of verse translations by a variety of English poets. These verse translations included some by John Addington Symonds made specifically for Wharton's edition. Wharton used the Greek texts as edited by Theodor Bergk, and retained Bergk's numbering of the fragments. On the frontispiece is an engraved portrait of Sappho by John Cother Webb, after Lawrence Alma-Tadema's Sappho and Alcaeus.

Sappho: Memoir, Text, Selected Renderings went through three editions during Wharton's lifetime, in 1885, 1887, and 1895. To the second edition, Wharton added a discussion of the then-recently discovered papyrus fragments from Faiyum in Egypt. Aubrey Beardsley designed the cover for the third edition. A fourth, posthumous edition was published in 1897, which added a biography of Wharton; further reprinted editions were issued in 1907 and 1974.

Wharton's Sappho included the first modern language translations to adopt Theodor Bergk's reading of the Ode to Aphrodite in which the object of Sappho's desire is female. Both Wharton's own prose translation and Symonds' verse translation used feminine pronouns for Sappho's beloved, although for the third edition Symonds emended his translation to use male pronouns. Wharton's prose translation of Sappho 102 Voigt (90 Wharton) also suggests a homosexual Sappho, telling of Sappho's "longing for a maiden". However, in his introduction to the book Wharton implicitly asserts Sappho's heterosexuality, praising Friedrich Gottlieb Welcker's "celebrated refutation of the long-current calumnies against Sappho", and in the later editions he became increasingly concerned with defending her moral character.

== Reception ==
Wharton's edition was popular and influential, both on writers and later translators of Sappho. Until John Maxwell Edmonds published a translation of Sappho for the Loeb Classical Library in 1922, it was the most widely-read English translation of her works.

The lesbian couple Katherine Bradley and Edith Cooper, who wrote together under the pen-name Michael Field, were inspired by Wharton's Sappho for their first volume of poetry, Long Ago. Natalie Clifford Barney and Renée Vivien were influenced by Wharton's translation after Barney acquired a copy on a visit to London. It was part of the impetus for their formation of the literary group "Sapho 1900" (along with Pierre Louÿs's Songs of Bilitis), and was the model for Renée Vivien's own 1903 French translation of Sappho. The modernist poets Ezra Pound and H.D. were also influenced by Wharton, and Thomas Hardy and e.e. cummings owned a copy of his translation. Helena Bantock, the wife of the composer Granville Bantock, was inspired by Wharton to adapt Sappho's poetry; her husband used these adaptations as the text for his song-cycle Sappho.

In the introduction to his 1915 translation of Sappho, the modernist poet Edward Storer recommended Wharton's as the best available, on which he relied in producing his own translation. David Moore Robinson and Marion Mills Miller's 1925 translation, The Songs of Sappho, was modelled after Wharton, as was Edwin Marion Cox's The Poems of Sappho from the same year. Mary Barnard, who published the influential Sappho: A New Translation in 1958, was given a copy of Wharton's edition as a birthday present while she was a student, and was inspired by it to adapt fragments of Sappho into English verse.

== Works cited ==
- Barnsley, Sarah (2013). "Making It New: Sappho, Mary Barnard and American Modernism". Synthesis. 5: 71–93. doi:10.12681/syn.17432.
- DeJean, Joan (1989). Fictions of Sappho: 1546 – 1937. Chicago: University of Chicago Press.
- Goldschmidt, Nora (2018). Fragmentary Modernism: The Classical Fragment in Literary and Visual Cultures, c.1896 - c.1936.
- Prettejohn, Elizabeth (2008). "Solomon, Swinburne, Sappho". Victorian Review. 34 (2).
- Prins, Yopie (1995). "Sappho Doubled: Michael Field". The Yale Journal of Criticism. 8 (1).
- Prins, Yopie (1999). Victorian Sappho.
- Reynolds, Margaret (2003). The Sappho History. Palgrave. ISBN 978-0333971703.
- Rohrbach, Erika (1996). "H.D. and Sappho: 'A Precious Inch of Palimpsest'". In Greene, Ellen (ed.). Re-Reading Sappho: Reception and Transmission. Berkeley: University of California Press.
- Wharton, Henry Thornton (1887). Sappho: Memoir, Text, Selected Renderings, and a Literal Translation (2nd ed.). London: David Stott.
- Whiteman, Bruce (2014). "Sappho; or, on Loss". The Hudson Review. 66 (4): 673–688. JSTOR 43488765.
