= Jean Garrigue =

American poet

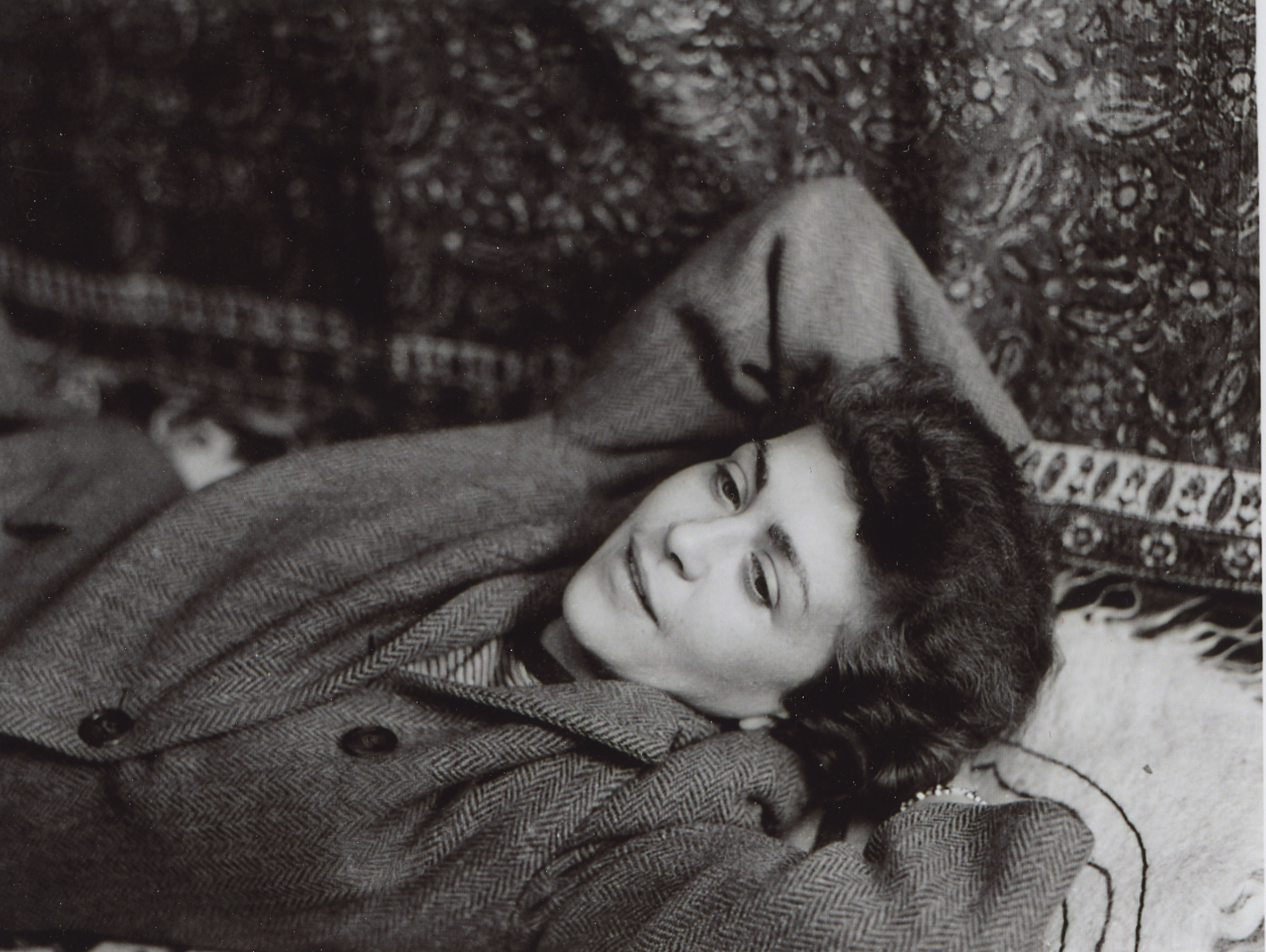
- Born: Gertrude Louise Garrigus; December 8, 1912; Evansville, Indiana
- Died: December 27, 1972 (aged 60); Boston, Massachusetts
- Education: Universities of Chicago & Iowa
- Occupation: Writer
- Writing career
- Pen name: Jean Garrigue
- Genre: Poetry/Fiction/Non-fiction

Jean Garrigue (December 8, 1912 – December 27, 1972) was an American poet. In her lifetime, she received a Guggenheim Fellowship and a nomination for a National Book Award.

== Life ==
Jean Garrigue was born Gertrude Louise Garrigus in Evansville, Indiana, to Allan Colfax and Gertrude (Heath) Garrigus. She was born in 1912 but later gave 1914 as her birth year. She had one sister, Marjorie, and one brother, Ross.

Garrigue lived in Indianapolis for much of her early life, graduating from Shortridge High School in 1931. After attending Butler University, she graduated with a Bachelor of Arts from the University of Chicago, where her roommate was novelist Marguerite Young. She received her Master of Fine Arts from the Iowa Writers Workshop in 1943.

She changed her name to Jean Garrigue in 1940, bringing the name closer to its original French spelling, and making it more gender-ambiguous. Garrigue moved to New York City and spent most of her life in Manhattan, aside from her teaching engagements and travels throughout the United States, Europe, and Asia.

In 1971, Garrigue was diagnosed with Hodgkin's disease.

She died at the Massachusetts General Hospital on December 27, 1972; her funeral was held at the Appleton chapel of Memorial Church at Harvard University.

== Influences and notable relationships ==
Garrigue claimed Chopin, Keats, and Proust as early influences and she admired the English poets Thomas Wyatt, Samuel Taylor Coleridge, William Blake, and W. B. Yeats.

After meeting at Yaddo in 1949, Garrigue maintained a relationship with Josephine Herbst that lasted until Herbst died in 1969. The two exchanged thousands of letters over the years, and Garrigue frequently stayed at Herbst's farm in Erwinna, Pennsylvania. Garrigue also exchanged letters with Marianne Moore and Delmore Schwartz.

== Works ==
Garrigue was first published in 1941 by The Kenyon Review while she worked for Collier's as a researcher, edited a United States Organizations (U.S.O.) publication during World War II, and served as an assistant editor of an aeronautical magazine, The Flying Cadet.

In 1944, James Laughlin, poet and publisher, included her collection Thirty-Six Poems and a Few Songs in the third series of his New Directions collection, Five Young American Poets, along with breakout poets like John Frederick Nims and Tennessee Williams.

Garrigue began teaching poetry and creative writing courses in the 1950s and continued writing poetry, publishing The Monument Rose in 1953 and A Walk by Villa d'Este in 1959. She held a Rockefeller Foundation Fellowship, which allowed her to travel to Paris in 1954, and in 1960, she was a member of the Guggenheim Fellowship.

In the 1960s, Garrigue published collections including Country Without Maps (in 1964) and New and Selected Poems (in 1967). She published a critical study of Marianne Moore in 1965 and a prose publication, Essays and Prose Poems, in 1970. She also contributed to several publications, including The New Leader, The New Republic, Saturday Review of Literature, The Kenyon Review, Tomorrow, Botteghe Oscure, Poetry, Commentary, Arts Magazine, and the New York Herald Tribune.

Garrigue received awards for her works; The Kenyon Review awarded her two of their first prizes, one for a 1944 short story and the other for her 1966 novella The Animal Hotel, which George Plimpton claims was based on people Herbst met while staying at the Hotel Helvetia in Paris but was more likely based on Garrigue's stays at Erwinna with Herbst. She was nominated for a National Book award for Country Without Maps. She was also awarded and honored by the Rockefeller Foundation, Guggenheim Museum, National Academy of Arts and Letters, The Hudson Review, and Radcliffe Institute.

Garrigue was a teacher of English, creative writing, and poetry at several different universities, including the University of Iowa, Bard College, Queen's College, the New School, the University of Colorado, Smith College, and the University of Washington. Along with teaching, Garrigue was poet-in-residence for several institutions, including the University of California, Riverside, where she was resident in the Spring of 1972; she taught at Rhode Island College that fall until her health entered terminal decline.

Garrigue's poems were published posthumously in Studies for an Actress and Other Poems in 1973, which included her poem "The Grand Canyon."

== Reception ==
Garrigue's works were well-received and praised by her contemporaries, including John Ashbery, but her work has not received the same attention since her death, which Alfred Kazin described as one of the literary mysteries of the twentieth century. A critical study of Garrigue's work was published by Lee Upton in 1991. The following year, many of her poems were collected and released as Selected Poems. Garrigue's manuscript archives were acquired by the Berg collection of the New York Public Library, where they now reside.

Of the intensity and challenging nature of her poems, Randall Jarrell said that her work had "the guaranteeing and personal queerness of a diary," and many others have remarked on its uniqueness and strangeness. Her poems often describe a process of seeing and present a tide of images and ideas associated with the object seen. Lee Upton remarked on her "restless eye": "the eye is as the self-pouring over surfaces and in effect 'reading' them," and many critics have observed the extravagance of her imagery.

Stanley Kunitz described Garrigue as one "whose art took the road of excess that leads to the palace of wisdom. She was our one lyric poet who made ecstasy her home." Bonne August wrote that "Garrigue is a 'difficult' poet, difficult in the formal demands she makes on the reader; difficult, too, in the demands she makes on her poetry: to take her past easy formulations, comfortable insights, or glib prescriptions, to the truth of a thing." Jane Mayhall noted her drive to the "dangerously deep levels of self."

Garrigue did not belong to a poetic school or movement; Theodore Roethke stated she trusted her poetic instincts more than any poet he knew. Laurence Lieberman has said, "There are rewards to be secured in reading her best poems of a kind that can be found in no other body of work." Harvey Shapiro wrote, "Her way with language was Mozartean, breathtaking in its ability to ring change after change on a theme, Mozartean bursts of language, never leaving the subject, enabling the eye to see, clearly and more clearly, while delighting the ear with sound."

== Bibliography ==
- (Contributor) Five Young American Poets, third series, New Directions, 1944.
- The Ego and the Centaur (poems), New Directions, 1947, reprinted, Greenwood Press, 1972.
- (Contributor) Edwin Weaver, editor, Cross-Sections, L. B. Fischer, 1947.
- (Contributor) New World Writing, New American Library, 1952.
- The Monument Rose (poems), Noonday Press, 1953.
- A Water Walk by Villa d'Este (poems), St. Martins, 1959.
- Country Without Maps (poems), Macmillan, 1964.
- Marianne Moore, University of Minnesota Press, 1965.
- The Animal Hotel (novella), Eakins, 1966.
- New and Selected Poems, Macmillan, 1967.
- (Editor) Translations by American Poets, Ohio University Press, 1970.
- Studies for an Actress and Other Poems, Macmillan, 1973.
- (Compiler) Love's Aspects: The World's Great Love Poems, Doubleday, 1975.
- Selected Poems, University of Illinois, 1992.
