= W. R. Moses =

American poet

William Robert Moses (1911–2001) was an American poet known for his books Identities, Passage, Double View, Memoir, Edges, Tu Fu Poems, and other works.

== Biography ==
The son of an itinerant newspaperman, Moses lived in Minnesota and Wisconsin, and later in Tennessee and Ohio. (Self-description in Identities.) He was born in Minnesota in 1911.

Moses earned his PhD in English at Vanderbilt University, Nashville, Tennessee, where he studied under poet John Crowe Ransom. In Nashville he married Elizabeth Buttorff Petway (1913–2005) in 1935. In 1940 he was teaching at the University of Illinois. His son, Edwin, was born in Washington, D.C., where Moses, in the Navy from 1942 to 1946, was stationed in WWII as a US Navy officer assigned to communications; after the war he was a civilian employee of the Navy Department. In 1950 the family moved to Manhattan, Kansas, where he taught at Kansas State University, remaining there for 51 years until, in 2001, they rejoined their son, daughter-in-law, and grandchildren in Williamsport, Pennsylvania. Moses died suddenly a few months thereafter.

According to Poetry, Moses "contributed verse and criticism to practically all the literary journals...(over the course of) many years." Regarded as a "notable," poet, Moses was an editor of the Kansas Quarterly at Kansas State University, which Washburn University calls "the finest literary magazine in Kansas." The magazine was "under the auspices of the English Department."

In his poetic homage to poets and writers, "Letter to a Future Lover," the poet Ander Monson wrote to "W.R. Moses, poet and teacher at Kansas State who died a decade ago. I didn't know your poems either until now. There is still so much to be read. I found two copies here of your Collected Poems, too, so I liberated one..... reader, please feel free to take a card, a page, or this book entire: your theft will honor me."

== Works ==
In the book The Wesleyan Tradition: Four Decades of American Poetry, (Wesleyan University Press,: 1993) Michael Collier says in the "history of the Wesleyan University Press poetry program . . . W.R. Moses [et al.] produced an interesting and distinctive poetry."

In the 1935 Trial Balances, edited by Ann Winslow, the work of Moses and other poets were accompanied by critical essays.

Moses was published in the New Directions anthology Five Young American Poets in 1940, his first book, alongside John Berryman, Randall Jarrell, Mary Barnard and George Marion O'Donnell. His poetry was received rather coolly by reviewers who talk of "limp regularity of the lines... little striving to concentrate by means of metaphor, to underscore by a change of cadence, or to thrust home by climax..." and "baffling... unrelieved particularity in verse... He does not generalize, or generalizes barely, or generalizes badly... But since most young poets generalize too easily... his bias is exceptional and something should come of it."

His poem "Further Document on the Human Brain" was commented on by poet Allen Tate in Trial Balances: An Anthology Of New Poetry. Tate states that "the feature of Moses’ work that most forcibly strikes" him is "the conscious control of his material." He notices the juxtaposition of that control with its "shock of immediacy."

Moses was a contributor to The New Yorker with his poems "Sitting in the Woods: A Contemplation", "Boy At Target Practice: A Contemplation", "Suburban Flower Store, Washington, D. C."

Moses' books of poetry include Identities (Wesleyan University Press, 1965), Passage (Wesleyan University, 1976), Double View (Juniper Press, 1984), Memoir (Juniper Press, 1992), Edges (Juniper Press, 1994), Tu Fu Poems (Juniper Press, 1996).

Harriet Zinnes, reviewing Identities in the journal Books Abroad (now called World Literature Today, calls him a "contemporary romantic".

== Sources ==
- "No Music, No Poem": Interviews with W.R. Moses & W.D. Snodgrass, by Roy Scheele (2001, Juniper, ISBN 978-1-55780-164-7)
