= Idyll XXIII =

Poem doubtfully attributed to Theocritus

Idyll XXIII, also called Εραστής ('The Lover'), is a poem doubtfully attributed to the 3rd-century BC Greek poet Theocritus. It tells how a lover hanged himself at the gate of his obdurate darling who, in turn, was slain by a statue of Love.

== Summary ==
The poem purports to be sent by a lover to his neglectful beloved. The author tells how in a like case unrequited friendship led to the suicide of the one, and to the death of the other at the hands of an effigy of Love.

== Analysis ==
'Love stood on a pedestal of stone above the waters. And lo, the statue leaped, and slew that cruel one'

According to J. M. Edmonds, the actual death of a boy through the accidental falling of a statue probably gave rise to a folk-tale which is here put into literary shape.

== Authorship ==
This poem, known to the Latin poets, cannot be attributed with much certainty to Theocritus, and is found in only a small proportion of manuscripts, the text of which is corrupt.

== Sources ==
- Cholmeley, R. J., ed. (1919). The Idylls of Theocritus (2nd ed.). London: G. Bell & Sons, Ltd. pp. 344–47.

Attribution:

- Edmonds, J. M., ed. (1919). The Greek Bucolic Poets (3rd ed.). William Heinemann. pp. 277–85.
- Lang, Andrew, ed. (1880). Theocritus, Bion, and Moschus. London: Macmillan and Co. pp. 113–16.
