= Sappho: A New Translation =

1958 poetry translation by Mary Barnard

- Author: Mary Barnard
- Language: English
- Genre: Poetry
- Publisher: University of California Press
- Publication date: 1958
- ISBN: 0-520-22312-8

Sappho: A New Translation is a 1958 book by Mary Barnard with a foreword by Dudley Fitts. Inspired by Salvatore Quasimodo's Lirici Greci (Greek Lyric Poets) and encouraged by Ezra Pound, with whom Barnard had corresponded since 1933, she translated 100 poems of the archaic Greek poet Sappho into English free verse. Though some early reviewers criticised Barnard's choice not to use a more structured meter, her translation was both commercially and critically successful, and her work has inspired subsequent translators of Sappho's poetry.

== Background ==
Mary Barnard studied at Reed College from 1928 to 1932, where she was one of the few students to study ancient Greek. She already had an interest in Sappho: an early poem, "Impassioned Sonnet", written when she was still in high school, alludes to Sappho, and in a letter to her mother from 1930, Barnard signs as "a would-be Sappho". In 1930 she was given a copy of Henry Thornton Wharton's translation of the poetry of Sappho as a birthday present. This inspired her to adapt fragments of Sappho, such as in "Love Poem", a four-line adaptation of the twenty-eight-line "Ode to Aphrodite". In 1933, she began a correspondence with the poet Ezra Pound, sending him six of her poems.

In the early 1950s Barnard fell seriously ill. (Note: According to her memoir, Barnard began to fall ill following the death of her friend Carl van Doren in June 1950; her condition worsened in January 1951 and she was hospitalised in February.) In the spring of 1951 she returned to her parents' home in Vancouver to recuperate; there she contracted hepatitis B and was bedridden for six months. During this time she returned to studying Greek, and was sent a copy of Salvatore Quasimodo's Italian-language anthology Lirici Greci (Greek Lyric Poets). Inspired by this, and encouraged by Pound, to whom she sent early drafts, Barnard began to produce her own translations of Sappho's poetry. Existing translations of Sappho's works were often inaccurate. In the poem "Static" Barnard complained of their inadequacies, describing them as "whiskered mumble / ment of grammarians: / Greek pterodactyls / and Victorian dodos". She spent about two years working on her translation, recalling in her memoir that each fragment went through "about forty versions". Barnard completed her translation in 1953; it was published in 1958.

== Translation ==
To an army wife, in Sardis:

Some say a cavalry corps,
some infantry, some, again,
will maintain that the swift oars

of our fleet are the finest
sight on dark earth; but I say
that whatever one loves, is.

This is easily proved: did
not Helen—she who had scanned
the flower of the world's manhood—

choose as first among men one
who laid Troy's honour in ruin?
warped to his will, forgetting

love due her own blood, her own
child, she wandered far with him.
So Anactoria, although you

being far away forget us,
the dear sound of your footstep
and light glancing in your eyes

would move me more than glitter
of Lydian horse or armored
tread of mainland infantry

— Mary Barnard,
Sappho 16 Voigt = Sappho 41 Barnard

Sappho: A New Translation was published by the University of California Press. It is dedicated to Douglas and Mary Paige, who had sent Barnard the copy of Lirici Greci which inspired her translation. It comprises a foreword by Dudley Fitts, one hundred poems in translation, a note on the translation by Barnard, (Note: Barnard's research for this "footnote" later became the impetus for her 1966 essay collection The Mythmakers.) a list of sources for the poems, with their corresponding number in John Maxwell Edmonds' Loeb Classical Library edition, a bibliography and index. Barnard's translation is primarily based on the Greek text of Edmonds' Loeb edition, though she sometimes referred to other editions; in some cases she joined separate fragments together.

Barnard groups the poems into six sections, which – rather than following the conventional order – she arranges to give a narrative of Sappho's life from youth to old age. Within Part One, focused on Sappho's youth, Barnard further organises the poems by time of day, with the first poem in the section set at dawn and the last at night. Two poems precede the main six sections as a programmatic preface. A "Collector's Edition" published in 2026 also includes an introduction by Melissa Mueller and Greek texts to accompany Barnard's translations.

Barnard's translations render Sappho's poetry in contemporary language, in contrast to the old-fashioned diction preferred by previous translators. Sarah Barnsley describes Barnard's unadorned style as "late Imagism". In some cases Barnard alters or combines fragments. Where the surviving Greek text is too fragmentary to fully translate, she gives a conjectured reconstruction, for instance in the fourth and fifth stanzas of Sappho 16. The poems are given titles, and translated in free verse. She does not always retain the stanzaic structure of Sappho's poems: she often uses three-line stanzas where Sappho's poems are in four-line Sapphics, while for Sappho 130 she divides a two-line fragment, which survives only through being quoted by the second century AD grammarian Hephaestion, over six lines and three stanzas.

Barnard's free verse was based on her principle of the "balanced line", in which each line could be divided in two, and each half had the same metrical weight. For example, her translation of Sappho 94 Voigt (Sappho 42 Barnard) is headed "I have had not one word from her", which Barnsley scans as ◡ ◡ – – / – – ◡ ◡ : the syllables are exactly symmetrical. The titles added by Barnard are mostly exactly balanced in this manner, while in the body of the poems the balance is more approximate.

== Reception ==
Barnard's translation was both commercially and critically successful. Initially she had difficulty finding a publisher. Both Anchor Books and Viking Press rejected the manuscript because they did not think that it was commercially viable. As Barnard recalled in her memoir, "[Anchor] liked the poems, or so they said, but Sappho would never sell". Despite these difficulties, the translation had sold 100,000 copies by 1994 and as of 2025 had been continuously in print with the University of California Press for 67 years.

Early reviewers criticized Barnard for choosing to translate into free verse. Vivian Mercier, reviewing for Poetry, and W. B. Stanford, in Hermathena, both complained that Barnard had not used more structured meters, while the reviewer in The Classical Outlook suggested that the translations would have been more memorable had they been in rhyming verse. More recent critics have praised Barnard's prosody: in 1978, Anita Helle wrote in The Columbian that this was the "most important innovation" of Sappho: A New Translation. The choice to translate Sappho into free verse rather than attempting a metrical imitation has been followed by many subsequent translators.

In his review of Barnard's translation, Burton Raffel described Barnard's work as "as nearly perfect an English translation as one can find, a great translation, an immensely moving translation, complete, beautiful, deserving of endless praise". The classicist Guy Davenport, who published his own translation of Sappho's work in 1965, called it "surely the best Greek translation in American literature". In a 1994 review, Lorrie Goldensohn said that it was still one of the best English translations of Sappho's poetry. Barnard's translation is particularly influential in the US, where according to Josephine Balmer it is "iconic". It has been set to music twice, by the composers Sheila Silver and David Ward-Steinman.

Barnard's translation has influenced many subsequent writers. Bruce Whiteman identifies the translations of Sappho's works by Davenport and Jim Powell as following in Barnard's poetic lineage. Josephine Balmer acknowledges Barnard as an inspiration for her own translation of Sappho's poetry. The classicist Page duBois has credited reading Sappho: A New Translation as a teenager with inspiring her to learn ancient Greek.

== Works cited ==
- Balmer, Josephine (2013). Piecing Together the Fragments: Translating Classical Verse, Creating Contemporary Poetry. Oxford University Press. ISBN 978-0-19-958509-0.
- Barnard, Mary (1958). Sappho: A New Translation. University of California Press.
- Barnard, Mary (1984). Assault on Mount Helicon: A Literary Memoir. University of California Press.
- Barnard, Mary; Barnsley, Sarah (2025). Mary Barnard: complete poems and selected translations. Albany: State University of New York Press. ISBN 9798855802641.
- Barnsley, Sarah (2013a). "Making It New: Sappho, Mary Barnard and American Modernism". Synthesis. 5: 71–93. doi:10.12681/syn.17432.
- Barnsley, Sarah (2013b). Mary Barnard: American Imagist. State University of New York Press. ISBN 978-1-4384-4855-8.
- Christy, Angela (1994). "The Mary Barnard Translation of Sappho". Paideuma: Modern and Contemporary Poetry and Poetics. 23 (1): 25–63. JSTOR 24726068.
- Donahue, Bill (1 September 2009). "Channelling Sappho". Reed Magazine. Archived from the original on 17 January 2024.
- Englert, Walter (2 August 1999). "The Words She Commands: Translating Sappho From the Heart". Reed Magazine.
- Ewing, Molly O'Hara (1994). "The Poetry of Mary Barnard: A Study in Voice and Verse". Paideuma. 23 (1): 65–108. ISSN 0090-5674. JSTOR 24726069.
- Goff, Barbara; Harloe, Katherine (2021). "Sappho in the 20th Century and Beyond". In Finglass, P. J.; Kelly, Adrian (eds.). The Cambridge Companion to Sappho. Cambridge: Cambridge University Press. ISBN 978-1-316-63877-4.
- Goldensohn, Lorrie (1994). "'The Speech of Her Stringed Shell': Mary Barnard's 'Sappho'". Paideuma: Modern and Contemporary Poetry and Poetics. 23 (1): 13–23. JSTOR 24726067.
- Gordon, David (1994). "Ezra Pound to Mary Barnard: An ABC of Metrics". Paideuma: Modern and Contemporary Poetry and Poetics. 23 (1): 159–179. JSTOR 24726075.
- Grover, Emma (29 October 2017). "Finding Sappho: Four Translations in Conversation". The Stanford Daily.
- Helle, Anita (28 May 1978). "Nothing Will Keep Her From Her Poetry". The Columbian. pp. 25–26.
- Mercier, Vivian (1959). "Ovid and Sappho in Translation". Poetry. 95 (3): 185–189. JSTOR 20587720.
- Mueller, Melissa (2026). "Introduction". Sappho: the Mary Barnard translation. Oakland, California: University of California Press. ISBN 978-0-520-40071-9.
- Piantanida, Cecilia (2021). Sappho and Catullus in 20th Century Italian and American Poetry. Bloomsbury.
- Prins, Yopie (1996). "Sappho's Afterlife in Translation". In Greene, Ellen (ed.). Re-Reading Sappho: Reception and Transmission. University of California Press.
- Raffel, Burton (1965). "Mary Barnard's Sappho". The Hudson Review. 18 (2): 236–241. doi:10.2307/3848520. JSTOR 3848520.
- "Her translation turned Sappho into a modernist icon: Mary Ethel Barnard '32". Reed Magazine. November 2001.
- R. M. (1960). "[Review] Sappho: A New Translation". The Classical Outlook. 38 (3). JSTOR 43929668.
- Stanford, W. B. (1958). "[Review] Folk Tale, Fiction, and Saga in the Homeric Epics and Sappho: A New Translation". Hermathena. 92. JSTOR 23039119.
- Whiteman, Bruce (2014). "Sappho; or, on Loss". The Hudson Review. 66 (4): 673–688. JSTOR 43488765.
