= Idyll XXVI =

Greek poem attributed to Theocritus

Idyll XXVI, also titled Λῆναι ('The Bacchanals') or Βάκχαι ('The Bacchantes'), is a bucolic poem doubtfully attributed to the 3rd-century BC Greek poet Theocritus. This Idyll narrates the murder of Pentheus, who was torn to pieces (after the Dionysiac Ritual) by his mother, Agave, and other Theban women, for having watched the celebration of the mysteries of Dionysus.

== Analysis ==
According to J. M. Edmonds, this poem may have been written to celebrate the initiation of a nine-year-old boy into the mysteries of Dionysus, through a mock slaying-rite. That young children were initiated into these mysteries is, he presumes, clear from a poem by Antistius in the Anthology, which may have been written for a similar occasion; and in Callimachus Artemis asks that her maiden attendants shall be nine years old. In this poem the father describes the slaying of Pentheus by his mother, and takes credit to himself for following her example. Edmonds notes, "The slaying of the boy is the bringing of him to Dionysus, even as the eagles made Ganymede immortal by bringing him to Zeus." The poem is almost certainly not by Theocritus.

== Illustrations ==
Now Pentheus from a lofty cliff was watching all ... Autonoe first beheld him, ... and, rushing suddenly, with her feet dashed all confused the mystic things of Bacchus the wild

'Tis for thee to caress thy kine, not a maiden unwed

== See also ==
- The Bacchae

== Sources ==
Attribution:

- Edmonds, J. M., ed. (1919). The Greek Bucolic Poets (3rd ed.). William Heinemann. pp. 325–9.
- Lang, Andrew, ed. (1880). Theocritus, Bion, and Moschus. London: Macmillan and Co. pp. 135–7.
