= George Thornley =

English translator

George Thornley (1614 – after 1657) was an English writer, known for his oft-reprinted translation of the Greek novel Daphnis and Chloe.

== Life ==
George Thornley was born in 1614. He was the son of Thomas Thornley described as "of Cheshire", and studied at Repton School under Thomas Whitehead, the first master appointed on the re-founding of the school in 1621. Whitehead's usher at the time, John Lightfoot, was afterwards master of St. Catherine's, and was elected Vice-Chancellor of the University of Cambridge in 1655. Whitehead sent many of his scholars to his old college, Christ's, and it was here that Thornley was admitted sizar—sizarships were given to poor students—under Mr. King in 1631. This King is the Edward King who is the subject of Milton’s Lycidas, and Milton resided at Christ's from 1625 to 1632. In 1635 Thornley proceeded Bachelor in Arts, and we hear no more of him, save that in his forty-fourth year he is described upon the title-page of his Daphnis and Chloe as "Gentleman".

=== Daphnis and Chloe ===
Thornley's only known work is his Daphnis and Chloe (1657). In making his translation Thornley had before him the parallel Latin and Greek edition of Jungermann, published in 1605. According to J. M. Edmonds, who revised Thornley's translation for the Loeb Classical Library, "His [Thornley's] English is often suggested by Jungermann's Latin; in one or two places he has made mistakes through paying more attention to the Latin than to the Greek; and he sometimes prefers a reading only to be found in Jungermann's notes." Edmonds gives the following, glowing assessment of Thornley's sole achievement: "There is nothing on Thornley’s title-page to tell us that his book is a translation, and if his 'most sweet and pleasant pastoral romance' ever came into the hands of the 'young ladies' for whom he wrote it, they may well have supposed it to be his original work. For although his rendering is generally close enough to the Greek to satisfy the most fastidious modern scholar, it has all the graces of idiom, rhythm, and vocabulary characteristic of the best English prose of the day. [...] He always shows you that he has a complete grasp of the situation he is describing. He not only sees and hears, but he thinks and feels. He knows what it was like to be there."
