= Arkansas Review =

Humanities journal

- Discipline: Humanities and Social Sciences
- Language: English
- Edited by: Marcus Tribbett

Publication details
- Former name: Kansas Quarterly
- Publisher: Arkansas State University (United States)
- Frequency: Triannually (April, August, December)

Standard abbreviations
- ISO 4: Ark. Rev.

Indexing
- ISSN: 0022-8745

Links
- Journal homepage

Arkansas Review: A Journal of Delta Studies is an interdisciplinary humanities journal that focuses on the seven states of the Mississippi River Delta. Each issue of the journal contains fiction, nonfiction, poetic, and visual art works which offer different perspectives on the Delta region. The journal is assembled and published through the Department of English, Philosophy, and World Languages at Arkansas State University in Jonesboro, Arkansas under the direction of Marcus Tribbett.

== History ==
=== Origins ===
The Arkansas Review was originally known as Kansas Quarterly (1965 until 1993). It was founded at Kansas State University and edited by W. R. Moses, Ben Nyberg and Harold Schneider. After losing several key editorial members at Kansas State and running out of funding in 1995, the publication was moved to the Department of English and Philosophy at Arkansas State University under the editorial direction of Norman Lavers, a creative writing professor at Arkansas State. The publication underwent a name change to Kansas Quarterly/Arkansas Review to reflect both its origin and its current status.

The publication secured funding through the Delta Studies program at Arkansas State University and began dedicating a portion of the journal to literature, essays, and creative materials related to the Mississippi River Delta. In 1997, Norman Lavers stepped away from the general editor position due to an overload of submitted materials. William Clements, a local folklorist, became the general editor of the publication, and he focused on reshaping the publication by including interdisciplinary humanities materials to reflect the new home of the journal, the Delta. In early 1998 under the new vision for the journal, the Kansas Quarterly/Arkansas Review became the Arkansas Review: A Journal of Delta Studies and began including scholarship from multiple humanities fields such as archaeology, art history, geography, history, political science, and sociology in addition to creative scholarship included in previous editions of the journal.

The Arkansas Review continues Clements' vision for the journal and publishes a new issue every April, August, and December. Many issues have a variety of topics, but some special editions focus on a central theme such as particular writers in the Delta or regional events.
