= Michael Field (author) =

Collective pseudonym for Katharine Harris Bradley and Edith Emma Cooper

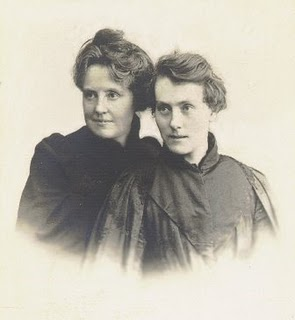
- Portrait of the writers Bradley (left) and Cooper (right), known as Michael Field
- Born: Katherine Harris Bradley; 27 October 1846; Birmingham, Warwickshire, England, UK Edith Emma Cooper; 12 January 1862; Kenilworth, Warwickshire, England, UK
- Died: 26 September 1914 (aged 67); Brereton, Staffordshire, England, UK 13 December 1913 (aged 51); Richmond, Surrey, England, UK
- Resting place: St Mary Magdalen Roman Catholic Church
- Education: Collège de France and Newnham College University College
- Occupation: Writer
- Writing career
- Pen name: Arran Leigh Isla Leigh
- Language: English
- Period: Long nineteenth century
- Movement: Aestheticism

Michael Field was a pseudonym used for the poetry and verse drama of the English authors Katherine Harris Bradley (27 October 1846 – 26 September 1914) and her niece and ward Edith Emma Cooper (12 January 1862 – 13 December 1913). As Field, they wrote around 40 works together, and a long journal Works and Days. Their intention was to keep the pen-name secret, but it became public knowledge, not long after they had confided in their friend Robert Browning.

== Biographies ==
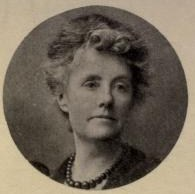
Bradley

Katherine Bradley was born on 27 October 1846 in Birmingham, England, the daughter of Charles Bradley, a tobacco manufacturer, and Emma (née Harris). Her grandfather, also Charles Bradley, was a prominent follower and financial backer of prophetess Joanna Southcott and her self-styled successor John "Zion" Ward. She attended lectures at the Collège de France in 1868, and in 1874 she attended a course at Newnham College, Cambridge specially designed for women; however, she did not receive a degree for it.

Bradley's elder sister, Emma, married James Robert Cooper in 1860 and went to live in Kenilworth, where their daughter, Edith Emma Cooper, was born on 12 January 1862. Emma Cooper became an invalid for life after the birth of her second daughter, Amy, and Katharine Bradley, being her sister, stepped in to become the legal guardian of her niece Edith Cooper.

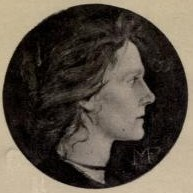
Cooper

Bradley was for a time involved with Ruskin's utopian project. She published first under the pseudonym Arran Leigh, a nod to Elizabeth Barrett. Cooper adopted the name Isla Leigh for their first joint publication, Bellerophôn.

In the late 1870s, when Cooper was at University College, Bristol, they agreed to live together and were, over the next 40 years, lesbian lovers and co-authors. Their first joint publication as Michael Field was "Callirhöe and Fair Rosamund" in 1884. 'The Athenaeum noted that 'the famous Faun song in 'Callirrhoé,' which has found its way into many anthologies, the Fairy songs in 'Fair Rosamund,' and the whole of the poignant drama of 'The Father's Tragedy' were the work of the younger writer while still a girl.'

In 1889, they published Long Ago, a collection of 68 poems that imagined the full collection of Sappho's poetry from the fragments included in Henry Thornton Wharton's Sappho: Memoir, Text, Selected Renderings, and a Literal Translation (1885). Long Ago represented Sappho as a complex figure and included heteroerotic and homoerotic desire. It had a large influence on the next wave of women who represented Sappho in poetry, including the poets Renée Vivien, H.D., and Amy Lowell.

Bradley and Cooper were Aestheticists, strongly influenced by the thoughts of Walter Pater. They developed a large circle of literary friends and contacts; in particular, painters and life partners Charles Ricketts and Charles Shannon, near whom they settled in Richmond, London. Robert Browning was a close friend of theirs — if also the source of their leaked identity — as well as Rudyard Kipling. They also knew and admired Oscar Wilde, whose death they bitterly mourned.

While Bradley and Cooper were always well connected and financially independent, their early critical success was not sustained. (This is often attributed to the joint identity of Field becoming known). They knew many of the aesthetic movement of the 1890s, including Walter Pater, Vernon Lee, J. A. Symonds and also Bernard Berenson. William Rothenstein was a friend. In 1899, the death of Cooper's father enabled them to buy their own house as evidence of their "close marriage" although Cooper saw her father's death as retribution for their lifestyle. She later led the way in establishing the couple as active Catholics.

Bradley and Cooper wrote a number of passionate love poems to each other, and their name, Michael Field, was their way of declaring their inseparable oneness. Friends referred to them as the Fields, the Michaels, or the Michael Fields while they themselves had a range of pet names for each other. They also were passionately devoted to their pets, particularly their dog, Whym Chow, for whom they wrote a book of elegiac poems entitled Whym Chow: Flame of Love. Their joint journal starts with an account of Bradley's passion for Alfred Gérente, an artist in stained glass and brother of Henri Gérente, who was of an English background but worked mostly in France. It goes on to document Michael Field as a figure amongst 'his' literary counterparts and their lives together. When Whym Chow died in 1906, the emotional pattern of the relationship was disturbed; both women became Roman Catholic converts in 1907. Their religious inclinations are reflected in their later works while their earlier writing was influenced by classical and Renaissance culture in its pagan aspects, particularly Sappho as understood by the late Victorians and perhaps Walter Savage Landor.

Bradley found that she had breast cancer in June 1913 and told only her confessor, Vincent McNabb; she never told Cooper, who had been diagnosed with cancer in 1911. Cooper died on 13 December 1913 at their home, The Paragon, Richmond. Bradley died on 26 September 1914, having moved to a cottage near McNabb at Hawkesyard Priory, Rugeley. They are buried together in the cemetery of St Mary Magdalen Roman Catholic Church in Mortlake. Bradley left most of her property to Charles Ricketts with a bequest of letters to the poet Frederick Gurney Salter and jewels and manuscripts to the University of Cambridge.

== Legacy ==
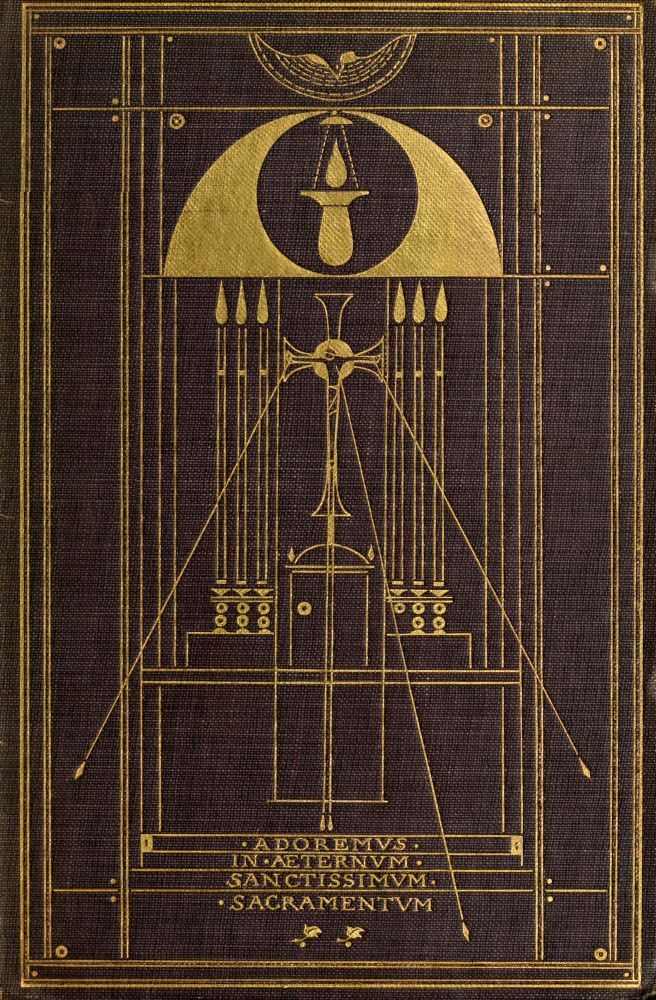
Front cover to Field's 1912 book Poems of Adoration, designed by Charles Ricketts

In 1923, saddened at the lack of a memorial for Bradley and Cooper, Charles Ricketts designed one for them of black stone, for which John Gray wrote the epitaph: 'United in blood, united in Christ'. However, this tombstone at St Mary Magdalen Roman Catholic Church Mortlake cracked irreparably in 1926, the year in which it was installed, and is now lost.

Their extensive diaries are stored in the British Library, and have been digitized and made available by the Victorian Lives and Letters Consortium. Carolyn Dever argues that the diaries contain many novelistic qualities — at least up until the time of Whym Chow's death.

A much-edited selection from the journals, which consists of two dozen annual volumes in ledgers with aspects of scrapbooks combined with a self-conscious literary style of composition, was prepared by T. Sturge Moore, a friend through his mother Marie.

== Reception ==
A review of their poems in 1908 noted that "One of the London weeklies, announcing the new volume, comments on the strange anomaly that a poet of 'Michael Field’s' distinction should have had such slight recognition in this country." A writer in the Academy was quoted as saying that "he is perhaps the greatest of our living lyric poets who are actually writing at this time, and it is claimed that those who are acquainted with the poet's work must agree with this appreciation." "Without entering into the question of comparative merit," said the Yorkshire Observer, "it may be readily admitted that the poems have had a genuine note of distinction". The Athenaeum noted that "Seven years ago both poets were received into the Roman Church, and their definitely Catholic work is represented by two volumes of devotional verse: 'Poems of Adoration,' by the younger, and 'Mystic Trees,' by the elder writer."

== Works ==
- The New Minnesinger and other poems (London: Longmans, Green, and Co., 1875) poems by Arran Leigh.
- Bellerophon (C. Kegan Paul, 1881) by Arran and Isla Leigh.
- Callirrhoe & Fair Rosamund (1884) verse dramas.
- The Father's Tragedy (1885) verse drama.
- William Rufus (1885) verse drama.
- Loyalty Or Love? (1885) verse drama.
- Brutus Ultor (1886) verse drama.
- Canute the Great (1887) verse drama.
- The Cup of Water (1887) verse drama.
- Long Ago (1889) poems.
- The Tragic Mary (1890) verse drama.
- Sight and Song (1892) E. Mathews and J. Lane, poems
- Stephania, a Trialogue (1892) verse drama.
- A Question of Memory (1893) drama.
- Underneath the Bough (1893) poems.
- Attila, My Attila (1896) verse drama.
- World at Auction (1898) Vale Press, verse drama.
- Noontide Branches (1899) verse drama.
- Anna Ruina (1899) verse drama.
- Race of Leaves (1901) Vale Press, verse drama.
- Julia Domna (1903) Vale Press, verse drama.
- Borgia (1905) verse drama.
- Wild Honey from Various Thyme (1908) poems.
- Queen Mariamne (1908) verse drama.
- Tragedy of Pardon (1911) verse drama.
- Tristan de Léonois (1911) verse drama.
- Dian (1911) verse drama.
- The Accuser (1911) verse drama.
- A Messiah (1911) verse drama.
- Poems of Adoration (1912).
- Mystic Trees (1913) poems.
- Whym Chow: Flame of Love (1914) poems.
- Ras Byzance (1918) verse drama.
- Deirdre (1918) verse drama.
- In The Name of Time (1919) verse drama.
- Selection (1923).
- The Wattlefold: Unpublished Poems (1930).
- Works and Days: From the Journal of Michael Field, (1933) edited by T. Sturge Moore (unpublished journals are now available on microfilm) kept from 1888, annual to 1914.
- A Shorter Shırazad: 101 Poems of Michael Field (1999) selection by Ivor C. Treby
- Where the Blessed Feet Have Trod – poem.

== See also ==
- Lesbian poetry

== Bibliography ==
- Dever, Carolyn. Chains of Love and Beauty: The Diary of Michael Field (Princeton UP, 2022).
- Donoghue, Emma. We Are Michael Field (Absolute Press, 1998).
- Ehnenn, Jill. Michael Field's Revisionary Poetics (Edinburgh UP, 2023).
- Prins, Yopie. Victorian Sappho (1999).
- Sturgeon, Mary. Michael Field (George G. Harrap & Co. Ltd., 1922).
- Treby, Ivor C. (ed). The Michael Field Catalogue: A Book of Lists (1998).
- Treby, Ivor C. Music and Silence: The Gamut of Michael Field (2000).
- Vanita, Ruth. Sappho and the Virgin Mary: Same-Sex Love and the English Literary Imagination (1996).
- Vadillo, Ana. Women Poets and Urban Aestheticism: Passengers of Modernity (Palgrave, 2005).
- Thain, Marion and Ana Vadillo. Michael Field, The Poet. Published and Manuscript Materials (Broadview, 2009).
