= Five Young American Poets =

Book by Randall Jarrell

Series' covers

Five Young American Poets was a set of poetry anthologies released from 1940 to 1944. The series was created by James Laughlin and published by New Directions Publishers.

== First Series (1940) ==
Poets

- W. R. Moses
- Randall Jarrell
- George Marion O'Donnell
- John Berryman
- Mary Barnard

Reviews

- Aiken, Conrad. "Review of Five Young American Poets." New Republic, vol. 104, 1941, pp. 670-671.
- Beatty, Richmond Croom. "Five Young Poets". Nashville Banner, vol. 65, no. 220, 24 Dec. 1940, p. 5.
- Craik, Nellie Benson. "Five Young Poets Seeking New Paths." Kansas City Star, vol. 61, no. 144, 08 Feb. 1941, p. 14.
- Daniel, Robert. "A Glimpse of the Future." Sewanee Review, vol. 49, no. 4, Oct.-Dec. 1941, 553-61.
- Frankenberg, L. "Review of Five Young American Poets." New Republic, vol. 153, 1941, pp. 56-57.
- Hoepfner, T. C. "Review of Five Young American Poets." Commercial Appeal, vol. 102, no. 26, 26 Jan. 1941, p. IV-10.
- Miles, Josephine. "Nothing for Granted." Accent, vol. 1, no. 3, Spring 1941, pp. 185-186.
- Ransom, John Crowe. "Constellation of Five Young Poets." Kenyon Review, vol. 3, no. 3, Summer 1941, pp. 377–380.
- Rosenberger, Coleman. "Five Young Voices". Washington Post, 15 Dec. 1940, p.B-6.
- Weismiller, Edward. "Five Young American Poets and How They Grew." Motive, vol. 1, no.3, Apr. 1941, pp. 19-20, 56-58.

== Second Series (1941) ==
Poets

- Clark Mills
- Karl Shapiro
- David Schubert
- Jeanne McGahey
- Paul Goodman

== Third Series (1944) ==
Poets

- Eve Merriam
- John Frederick Nims
- Jean Garrigue
- Tennessee Williams
- Alejandro Carrión
