= Johann Adam Bergk =

German philosopher and publicist

Johann Adam Bergk (1769 – 1834, Leipzig) was a German philosopher and publicist.

Bergk was professor of philosophy and jurisprudence at the University of Leipzig. A Kantian, he defended the French revolution in his Untersuchungen aus dem Natur-, Staats- und Völkerrechte (1796) and translated Beccaria into German.

During the Napoleonic occupation of Saxony he frequently came into conflict with the French censorship, e.g. his journal "Der europäische Aufseher" (i.e. The European Guard) was banned.

He was the father of the philologist Theodor Bergk.

== Quotation ==
- Beautiful works of art engage and invigorate our imagination in the most graceful and educational manner. Charming and gentle feelings are evoked in our soul by the magic of poetry. The beautiful arts make the world a beautiful place, make the people loveable and they enliven and diversify the monotonic and tedious aspects of life. (in: The Art of Reading. Including comments on publications and authors, 1799, page 168)
  - (Schöne Kunstwerke beschäftigen und erquicken die Einbildungskraft auf die anmutigste und lehrreichste Weise. Die reizendsten Gefühle und die lieblichsten Gedanken werden durch die Zaubereien der Dichtkunst in unserm Gemüte hervorgerufen. Die schönen Künste verschönern die Welt, machen die Menschen liebenswert und vermannigfaltigen und beleben das einförmige und träge Schauspiel des Lebens. )

== Works ==
- Untersuchungen aus dem Natur-, Staats- und Völkerrechte, mit einer Kritik der neuesten Konstitution der französischen Republik, 1796
- Briefe über Immanuel Kant's Metaphysische Anfangsgründe der Rechtslehre, enthaltend Erläuterungen, Prüfung und Einwürfe, 1797
- Reflexionen über I. Kant's metaphysische anfangsgrüde der Tugendlehre, 1798
- (tr.) Cesare Beccaria, Enthaltend: die Abhandlungen des Uebersetzers, die Meinungen der berühmtesten Schriftsteller über die Todesstrafe nebst einer Kritik derselben und einem Anhang von der Nothwendigkeit des Geschwornengerichts und von der Beschaffenheit und den Vortheilen desselben in England, Nordamerika und Frankreich, 1798
- Die Kunst, Bücher zu lesen. Nebst Bemerkungen über Schriften und Schriftsteller, 1799 (i.e. The Art of Reading. Including comments on publications and authors)
- Die philosophie des peinlichen Rechtes, 1802
