= Randall Jarrell =

American writer (1914–1965)

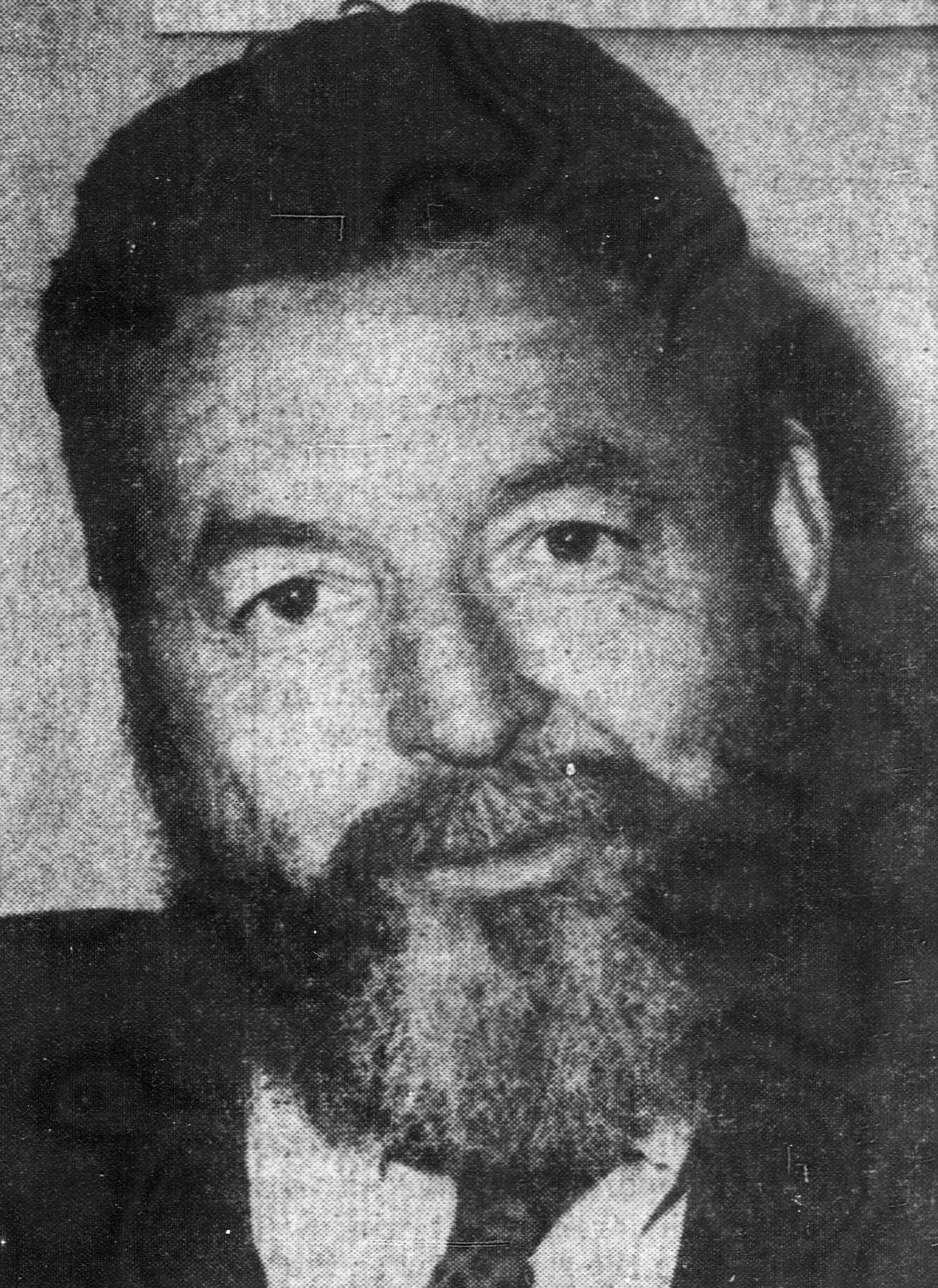
- Jarrell, circa 1962
- Born: May 6, 1914; Nashville, Tennessee, U.S.
- Died: October 14, 1965 (aged 51); Chapel Hill, North Carolina, U.S.
- Education: Vanderbilt University (BA, MA)
- Occupations: Poet; critic; novelist
- Writing career
- Notable works: The Woman at the Washington Zoo, The Lost World, Pictures from an Institution
- Notable awards: National Book Award

Randall Jarrell /dʒəˈrɛl/ jə-REL (May 6, 1914 – October 14, 1965) was an American poet, literary critic, children's author, essayist, and novelist. He was the 11th Consultant in Poetry to the Library of Congress—a position that now bears the title Poet Laureate of the United States.

Among other honors, Jarrell was awarded a Guggenheim Fellowship for the years 1947–48; a grant from the National Institute of Arts and Letters, in 1951; and the National Book Award for Poetry, in 1961.

== Biography ==
=== Youth and education ===
Jarrell was a native of Nashville, Tennessee. He attended Hume-Fogg High School where he "practiced tennis, starred in some school plays, and began his career as a critic with satirical essays in a school magazine." He received his B.A. from Vanderbilt University in 1935. While at Vanderbilt, he edited the student humor magazine The Masquerader, was captain of the tennis team, made Phi Beta Kappa and graduated magna cum laude. He studied there under Robert Penn Warren, who first published Jarrell's criticism; Allen Tate, who first published Jarrell's poetry; and John Crowe Ransom, who gave Jarrell his first teaching job as a Freshman Composition instructor at Kenyon College in Gambier, Ohio. Although all of these Vanderbilt tutors were involved with the conservative Southern Agrarian movement, Jarrell did not become a supporter of the Agrarians himself. According to Stephanie Burt, "Jarrell—a devotee of Marx and Auden— embraced his teachers' literary stances while rejecting their politics." He also completed his master's degree in English at Vanderbilt in 1937, beginning his thesis on A. E. Housman (which he completed in 1939).

When Ransom left Vanderbilt for Kenyon College in Ohio that same year, a number of his loyal students, including Jarrell, followed him to Kenyon. Jarrell taught English at Kenyon for two years, coached tennis, and served as the resident faculty member in an undergraduate dormitory that housed future writers Robie Macauley, Peter Taylor, and poet Robert Lowell. Lowell and Jarrell remained good friends and peers until Jarrell's death. According to Lowell biographer Paul Mariani, "Jarrell was the first person of [Lowell's] own generation [whom he] genuinely held in awe" due to Jarrell's brilliance and confidence even at the age of 23.

=== Career ===
Jarrell went on to teach at the University of Texas at Austin from 1939 to 1942, where he began to publish criticism and where he met his first wife, Mackie Langham. In 1942 he left the university to join the United States Army Air Forces. According to his obituary, he "[started] as a flying cadet, [then] he later became a celestial navigation tower operator, a job title he considered the most poetic in the Air Force." His early poetry, in particular “The Death of the Ball Turret Gunner”, principally concerned his wartime experiences in the Air Force.

The Jarrell obituary goes on to state that "after being discharged from the service he joined the faculty of Sarah Lawrence College in Bronxville, N.Y., for a year. During his time in New York, he also served as the temporary book review editor for The Nation magazine". Jarrell was uncomfortable living in the city and "claimed to hate New York's crowds, high cost of living, status-conscious sociability, and lack of greenery." He soon left the city for the Woman's College of the University of North Carolina where, as an associate professor of English, he taught modern poetry and "imaginative writing".

Jarrell divorced his first wife and married Mary von Schrader, a young woman whom he met at a summer writers' conference in Colorado, in 1952. They first lived together while Jarrell was teaching for a term at the University of Illinois Urbana-Champaign. The couple settled at Greensboro with Mary's daughters from her previous marriage. The couple also moved temporarily to Washington D.C. in 1956 when Jarrell served as the consultant in poetry at the Library of Congress (a position that later became titled Poet Laureate) for two years, returning to Greensboro and the University of North Carolina after his term ended.

=== Depression and death ===
Towards the end of his life, in 1963, Stephanie Burt notes, "Randall's behavior began to change. Approaching his fiftieth birthday, he seems to have worried deeply about his advancing age. . . After President Kennedy was shot, Randall spent days in front of the television weeping. Sad to the point of inertia, Randall sought help from a Cincinnati psychiatrist, who prescribed [the antidepressant drug] Elavil." The drug made him manic and in 1965, he was hospitalized and taken off Elavil. At this point, he was no longer manic, but he became depressed again. Burt also states that in April The New York Times published a "viciously condescending" review by Joseph Bennett of Jarrell's most recent book of poems, The Lost World, which said "his work is thoroughly dated; prodigiousness encouraged by an indulgent and sentimental Mama-ism; its overriding feature is doddering infantilism." Soon afterwards, Jarrell slashed a wrist and returned to the hospital. After leaving the hospital, he stayed at home that summer under his wife's care and returned to teaching at the University of North Carolina that fall.

Near dusk on October 14, 1965, while walking along U.S. highway 15-501 near Chapel Hill, N.C., where he had gone seeking medical treatment, Jarrell was struck by a motorist and killed. In trying to determine the cause of death, "[Jarrell's wife] Mary, the police, the coroner, and ultimately the state of North Carolina judged his death accidental, a verdict made credible by his apparent improvements in health ... and the odd, sidelong manner of the collision; medical professionals judged the injuries consistent with an accident and not with suicide." Nevertheless, because Jarrell had recently been treated for mental illness and a previous suicide attempt, some of the people closest to him were not entirely convinced that his death was accidental and suspected that he had taken his own life.

In a letter to Elizabeth Bishop about a week after Jarrell's death, Robert Lowell wrote, "There's a small chance [that Jarrell's death] was an accident. . . [but] I think it was suicide, and so does everyone else, who knew him well." Jarrell's death being a suicide has since become accepted practically as fact, even by people who were not personally close to him, and perpetuated by some writers. A. Alvarez, in his book The Savage God, lists Jarrell as a twentieth-century writer who killed himself, and James Atlas refers to Jarrell's "suicide" several times in his biography of Delmore Schwartz. The idea of Jarrell's death being a suicide was always denied by his wife.

== Legacy ==
On February 28, 1966, a memorial service was held in Jarrell's honor at Yale University, and some of the best-known poets in the country attended and spoke at the event, including Robert Lowell, Richard Wilbur, John Berryman, Stanley Kunitz, and Robert Penn Warren. Reporting on the memorial service, The New York Times quoted Lowell who said that Jarrell was "'the most heartbreaking poet of our time'. . . [and] had written 'the best poetry in English about the Second World War.'" These memorial tributes formed the basis for the book Randall Jarrell 1914–1965 which Farrar, Straus and Giroux published the following year.

In 2004, the Metropolitan Nashville Historical Commission approved placement of a historical marker in his honor, to be placed at his alma mater, Hume-Fogg High School. A North Carolina Highway Historical Marker was placed near his burial site in Greensboro, North Carolina.

== Writing ==
=== Poetry ===
In terms of the subject matter of Jarrell's work, the scholar Stephanie Burt observed, "Randall Jarrell's best-known poems are poems about the Second World War, poems about bookish children and childhood, and poems, such as 'Next Day,' in the voices of aging women." Burt also succinctly summarizes the essence of Jarrell's poetic style as follows:

Jarrell's stylistic particularities have been hard for critics to hear and describe, both because the poems call readers' attention instead to their characters and because Jarrell's particular powers emerge so often from mimesis of speech. Jarrell's style responds to the alienations it delineates by incorporating or troping speech and conversation, linking emotional events within one person's psyche to speech acts that might take place between persons. . .Jarrell's style pivots on his sense of loneliness and on the intersubjectivity he sought as a response.

Jarrell was first published in 1940 in 5 Young Poets, which also included work by John Berryman. His first separate collection of poetry, Blood for a Stranger, which was heavily influenced by W.H. Auden, was published in 1942 – the same year he enlisted in the United States Army Air Corps. His second and third books, Little Friend, Little Friend (1945) and Losses (1948), drew heavily on his Army experiences. The short lyric "The Death of the Ball Turret Gunner" is Jarrell's most famous war poem and one that is frequently anthologized.

His reputation as a poet was not firmly established until 1960 when his National Book Award-winning collection The Woman at the Washington Zoo was published. Beginning with this book, Jarrell broke free of Auden's influence and the influence of the New Critics and developed a style that mixed Modernist and Romantic influences, incorporating the aesthetics of William Wordsworth in order to create more sympathetic character sketches and dramatic monologues. The scholar Stephanie Burt notes, "Jarrell took from Wordsworth the idea that poems had to be 'convincing as speech' before they were anything else." His final volume, The Lost World, published in 1965, continued in the same style and cemented Jarrell's reputation as a poet; many critics consider it to be his best work. Stephanie Burt states that "in the 'Lost World' poems and throughout Jarrell's oeuvre. . .he took care to define and defend the self [and]. . .his lonely personae seek intersubjective confirmation and . . .his alienated characters resist the so-called social world." Burt identifies the chief influences on Jarrell's poetry to be "Proust, Wordsworth, Rilke, Freud, and the poets and thinkers of Jarrell's era [particularly his close friend, Hannah Arendt]."

=== Criticism ===
From the start of his writing career, Jarrell earned a solid reputation as an influential poetry critic. Encouraged by Edmund Wilson, who published Jarrell's criticism in The New Republic, Jarrell developed his style of critique which was often witty and sometimes fiercely critical. However, as he got older, his criticism began to change, showing a more positive emphasis. His appreciations of Robert Lowell, Elizabeth Bishop, and William Carlos Williams helped to establish or resuscitate their reputations as significant American poets, and his poet friends often returned the favor, as when Lowell wrote a review of Jarrell's book of poems The Seven League Crutches in 1951. Lowell wrote that Jarrell was "the most talented poet under forty, and one whose wit, pathos, and grace remind us more of Pope or Matthew Arnold than of any of his contemporaries." In the same review, Lowell calls Jarrell's first book of poems, Blood for a Stranger, "a tour-de-force in the manner of Auden." And in another book review for Jarrell's Selected Poems, a few years later, fellow-poet Karl Shapiro compared Jarrell to "the great modern Rainer Maria Rilke" and stated that the book "should certainly influence our poetry for the better. It should become a point of reference, not only for younger poets, but for all readers of twentieth-century poetry."

Jarrell is known for his essays on Robert Frost – whose poetry was a large influence on Jarrell's own – Walt Whitman, Marianne Moore, Wallace Stevens, and others, which were mostly collected in Poetry and the Age (1953). Many scholars consider him the most astute poetry critic of his generation, and in 1979, the poet and scholar Peter Levi went so far as to advise younger writers, "Take more notice of Randall Jarrell than you do of any academic critic."

In an introduction to a selection of Jarrell's essays, the poet Brad Leithauser wrote the following assessment of Jarrell as a critic:

[Jarrell's] multiple and eclectic virtues – originality, erudition, wit, probity, and an irresistible passion – combined to make him the best American poet-critic since Eliot. Or one could call him, after granting Eliot the English citizenship he so actively embraced, the best poet-critic we have ever had. Whichever side of the Atlantic one chooses to place Eliot, Jarrell was his superior in at least one significant respect. He captured a world that any contemporary poet will recognize as "the poetry scene"; his Poetry and the Age might even now be retitled Poetry and Our Age.

=== Fiction, translations, and children's books ===
In addition to poetry and criticism, Jarrell also published a satirical novel, Pictures from an Institution, in 1954, drawing upon his teaching experiences at Sarah Lawrence College, which served as the model for the fictional Benton College. He also wrote several children's books, among which The Bat-Poet (1964) and The Animal Family (1965) are considered prominent (and feature illustrations by Maurice Sendak). In 1957 Jarrell began his translation of Goethe‘s Faust Part One for Farrar, Straus and Giroux. It was published in 1976. Jarrell translated poems by Rainer Maria Rilke and others, a play by Anton Chekhov, and several Grimm fairy tales.

== Bibliography ==
=== Poetry ===
- The Rage for the Lost Penny in Five Young American Poets, Volume I, with Mary Barnard, John Berryman, W. R. Moses, and George Marion O’Donnell (New Directions, 1940)
- Blood for a Stranger (Harcourt, 1942)
- Little Friend, Little Friend (Dial, 1945)
- Losses (Harcourt, 1948)
- The Seven-League Crutches (Harcourt, 1951)
- Selected Poems (Knopf, 1955)
- The Woman at the Washington Zoo (Atheneum, 1960)
- The Lost World (Macmillan, 1965)
- The Complete Poems (Farrar, Straus & Giroux, 1969)
- Selected Poems (Farrar, Straus & Giroux, 1990)

=== Children’s books ===
- The Gingerbread Rabbit, illustrated by Garth Williams (Random House, 1964)
- The Bat-Poet, illustrated by Maurice Sendak (Macmillan, 1964)
- The Animal Family, illustrated by Maurice Sendak (Pantheon, 1965)
- Fly by Night, illustrated by Maurice Sendak (Farrar, Straus & Giroux, 1976)

=== Fiction ===
- Pictures from an Institution (Knopf, 1954)

=== Essays ===
- Poetry and the Age (Knopf, 1953)
- A Sad Heart at the Supermarket (Atheneum, 1962)
- The Third Book of Criticism (Farrar, Straus & Giroux, 1969)
- Kipling, Auden & Co.: Essays and Reviews, 1935–1964 (Farrar, Straus & Giroux, 1980)
- No Other Book: Selected Essays (HarperCollins, 1995)

=== Translations ===
- The Golden Bird and Other Fairy Tales of the Brothers Grimm, illustrated by Sandro Nardini (Macmillan, 1962)
- The Rabbit Catcher and Other Fairy Tales of Ludwig Bechstein, illustrated by Ugo Fontana (Macmillan, 1962)
- Anton Chekhov: The Three Sisters (Macmillan, 1969)
- Goethe’s Faust, Part I (Farrar, Straus & Giroux, 1976)

=== Anthologies edited ===
- The Anchor Book of Stories (Doubleday, 1958) aka Randall Jarrell's Book of Stories (New York Review Books, 2002)
- The Best Short Stories of Rudyard Kipling (Doubleday, 1961)
- The English in England (Doubleday, 1963)
- In the Vernacular: The English in India (Doubleday, 1963)
- Six Russian Short Novels (Doubleday, 1963)
