= Ball turret =

Aircraft mounted gun turret

Ball Turret
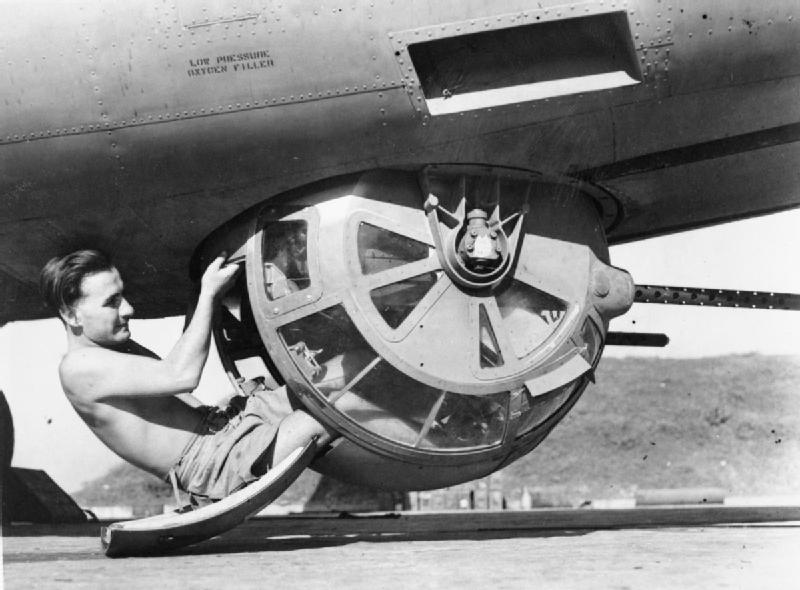
- A crewman poses with the Sperry ball turret of a Royal Air Force B-24, Burma, c.1943-1945

Service history
- Used by: United States, United Kingdom, China
- Wars: World War II

Specifications
- Caliber: .50 BMG

A ball turret is a spherical-shaped, altazimuth mount gun turret, fitted to some American-built aircraft during World War II. The name arose from the turret's spherical housing.

It was a manned turret, as distinct from remote-controlled turrets also in use. The turret held the gunner, two heavy machine guns, ammunition, and sights. The Sperry Corporation designed ventral versions that became the most common version; thus, the term "ball turret" generally indicates these versions.

== Sperry ball turret ==
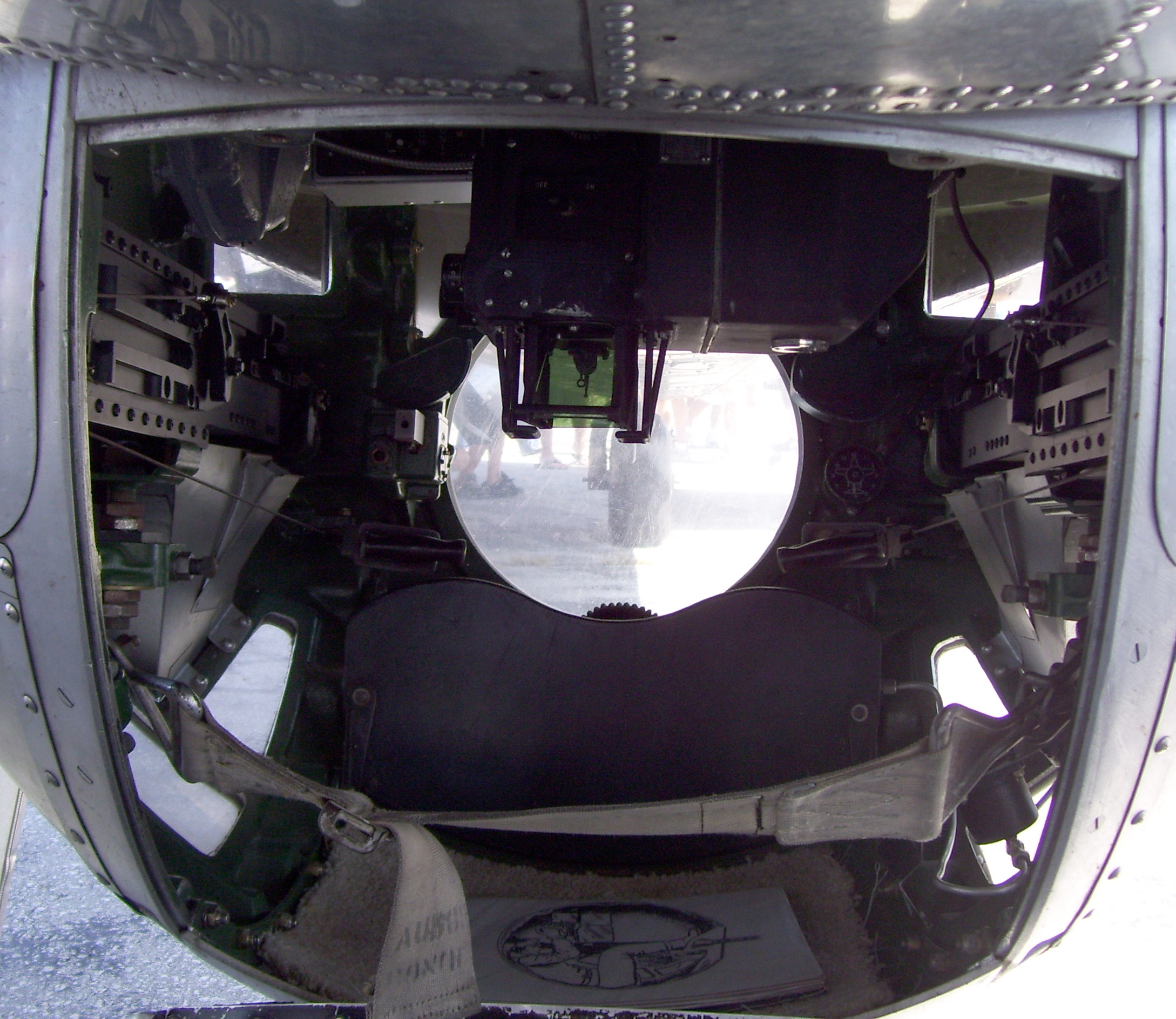
Interior of the Sperry ball turret of a preserved B-17 (2008)

Sperry and Emerson Electric each developed a ball turret, and the designs were similar in the nose turret version. Development of the spherical Emerson was halted. The Sperry nose turret was tested and preferred, but its use was limited due to poor availability of suitable aircraft designs. The Sperry-designed ventral system saw widespread use and production, including much sub-contracting. The design was mainly deployed on the B-17 Flying Fortress and the B-24 Liberator, as well as the United States Navy's Liberator, the PB4Y-1. The ventral turret was used in tandem in the Convair B-32, successor to the B-24. Ball turrets appeared in the nose and tail as well as the nose of the final series B-24.

The Sperry ball turret was 3 and a half feet in diameter in order to reduce drag, and was typically operated by the smallest man of the crew. To enter the turret, the turret was moved until the guns were pointed straight down. The gunner placed his feet in the heel rests and occupied his cramped station. He would put on a safety strap and close and lock the turret door. There was no room inside for a normal (back-worn) parachute, which was left in the cabin above the turret. The ball turret gunner was thus often the only man of the crew to not have a parachute on or next to him, though some gunners wore a chest parachute inside the turret.

The gunner was forced to assume a fetal position within the turret with his back and head against the rear wall, his hips at the bottom, and his legs held in mid-air by two footrests on the front wall. This left him positioned with his eyes roughly level with the pair of light-barrel Browning AN/M2 .50 caliber machine guns which extended through the entire turret, located to either side of the gunner. The charging handles were located too close to the gunner to be operated easily, so a cable was attached to the handle through pulleys to a handle near the front of the turret. Another factor was that not all stoppages could be corrected by charging (cocking) the guns. In many cases, when a stoppage occurred, it was necessary for the gunner to "reload" the gun, which required access to the firing chamber of the guns. Access was severely restricted by the guns' location in the small turret. Normally, the gunner accessed the firing chamber by releasing a latch and raising the cover to a position perpendicular to the gun but this was not possible in the ball turret. To remedy that, the front end of the cover was "slotted". The gunner released the latch and removed the cover which allowed space to clear the action. Small ammunition boxes rested on the top of the turret and additional ammunition belts fed the turret by means of a chute system. A reflector sight was hung from the top of the turret, positioned roughly between the gunner's feet.

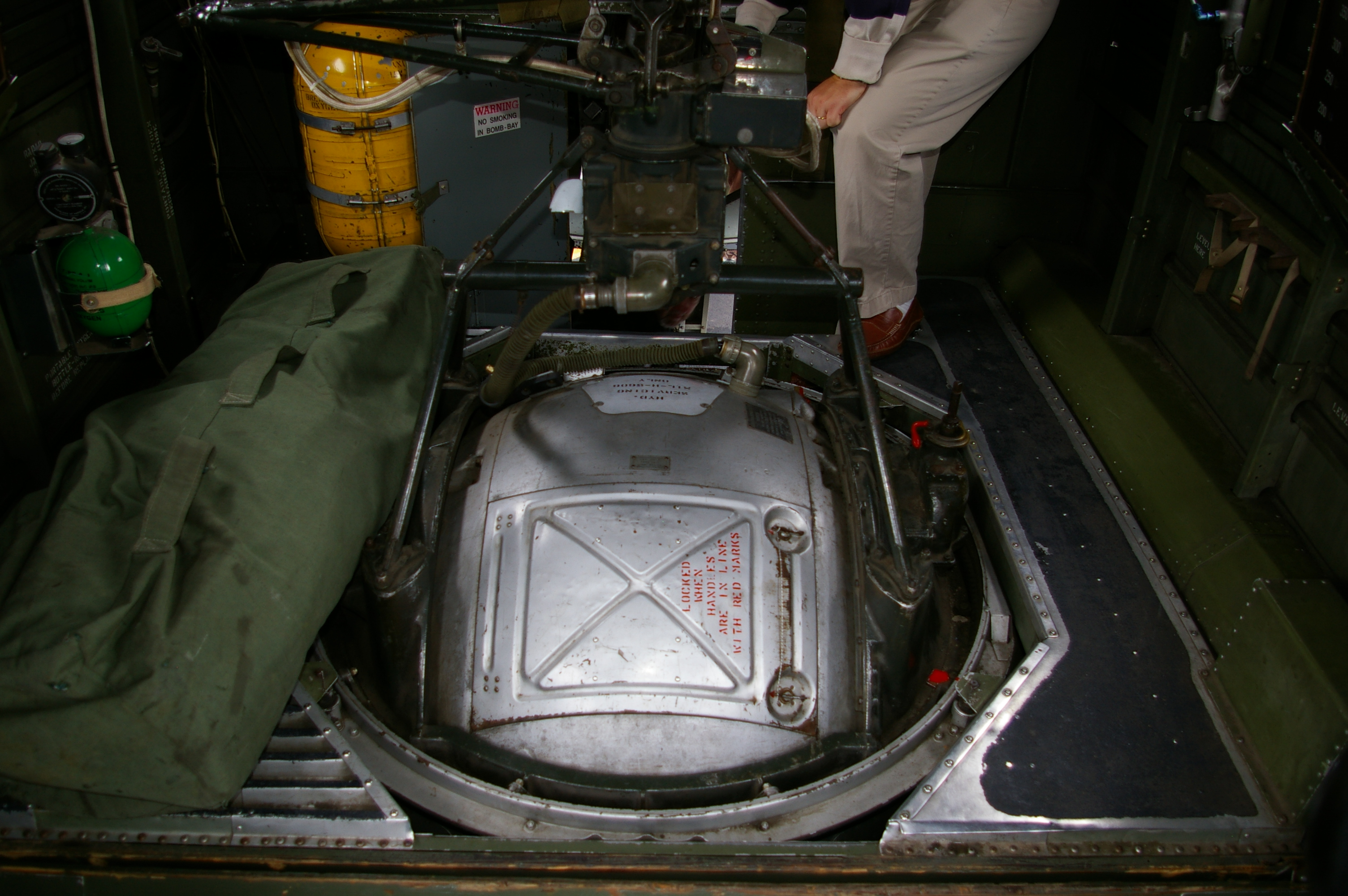
A B-24J's Sperry ventral ball turret in its retracted position for landing, as seen from inside the bomber

In the case of the B-24, the Liberator's tricycle landing gear design mandated that its A-13 model Sperry ball turret have a vertically retractable mount, so that the turret would not strike the ground as the plane pitches up for takeoff or during the landing flare. The conventional landing gear of the B-17 allowed for a non-retractable mount, but if the plane was required to do a belly landing (such as in the case of landing gear system failure), the ball turret would likely be destroyed due to the lack of clearance, meaning anyone occupying the turret would be in a precarious position if unable to escape.

== ERCO ball turret ==
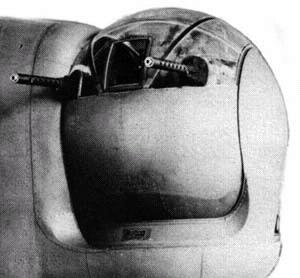
An Erco ball turret

After testing in mid-1943, the ERCO ball turret became the preferred bow installation in the US Navy's Consolidated PB4Y-1 Liberator and PB4Y-2 Privateer patrol bombers although other types continued to be installed. Earlier designs appeared in other patrol seaplanes. It served a double purpose, defense against bow attacks as well as fire suppression and offensive strafing in antisubmarine warfare. Since this turret is of the ball type, the gunner moves with his guns and sight in elevation and azimuth by means of control handles. Among the earlier designs was the Martin 250SH bow turret of the PBM-3 twin-engined patrol flying boat which had many points of similarity in design and action.

== See also ==
- The Death of the Ball Turret Gunner
