= The Death of the Ball Turret Gunner =

Poem by Randall Jarrell

"The Death of the Ball Turret Gunner" is a five-line poem by Randall Jarrell published in 1945. The poem is about the death of a gunner in a Sperry ball turret on a World War II American bomber aircraft.

From my mother's sleep I fell into the State,
And I hunched in its belly till my wet fur froze.
Six miles from earth, loosed from its dream of life,
I woke to black flak and the nightmare fighters.
When I died they washed me out of the turret with a hose.

Jarrell, who served in the Army Air Forces, provided the following explanatory note:

A ball turret was a Plexiglas sphere set into the belly of a B-17, B-24, B-25, B-32 and inhabited by two .50 caliber machine guns and one man, a short small man. When this gunner tracked with his machine guns a fighter attacking his bomber from below, he revolved with the turret; hunched upside-down in his little sphere, he looked like the fetus in the womb. The fighters which attacked him were armed with cannon firing explosive shells. The hose was a steam hose.

Technical/Historical Note: Of these aircraft, only the B-17 and B-24 had ball turrets. Neither the B-25 nor B-32 had them (see cross reference), although attempts were made with the B-32 whose cabin was pressurized like the B-29, and defensive armaments were remote controlled or used periscopes.

== Public reception ==
Reviewer Leven M. Dawson says that "The theme of Randall Jarrell's 'The Death of the Ball Turret Gunner' is that institutionalized violence, or war, creates moral paradox, a condition in which acts repugnant to human nature become appropriate." Most commentators agree, calling the poem a condemnation of the dehumanizing powers of "the State", which are most graphically exhibited by the violence of war.

Due partly to its short length, "The Death of the Ball Turret Gunner" poem has been widely anthologized. In fact, Jarrell came to fear that his reputation would come to rest on it alone.

The poem inspired the play "The Death of the Ball Turret Gunner" by Anna Moench, which premiered in New York City at the New York International Fringe Festival in August 2008 and was extended to play at The Space in Long Island City. A nod to the poem can also be found in John Irving's 1978 novel The World According to Garp, in which the protagonist's father died from a "rather careless lobotomy" by enemy gunfire while serving as a ball-turret gunner in World War II.
