= Pictures from an Institution =

1954 novel by Randall Jarrell

Pictures from an Institution: a Comedy
- First edition
- Author: Randall Jarrell
- Cover artist: John Sandford
- Language: English
- Genre: Satire
- Publisher: Alfred A. Knopf
- Publication date: 1954
- Publication place: United States
- Media type: Print
- Pages: 277
- OCLC: 285285

Pictures from an Institution: a Comedy is a 1954 novel by American poet Randall Jarrell. It is an academic satire, focusing on the oddities of academic life, in particular the relationships between the characters and their private lives. The nameless narrator, a Jarrell-like figure who teaches at a women's college called Benton, makes humorous observations about his students and his fellow academics; especially the latter, and in particular the offensively tactless novelist Gertrude, modeled on Mary McCarthy.

Some believe Benton was modeled after Sarah Lawrence College, where Jarrell had taught. The author was more circumspect, saying in an interview with the New York Times that "Benton is supposed to be just a type ... I've taken things from real places, but mostly have made them up".

== Characters ==
- Unnamed narrator, a professor of literature
- Gertrude Johnson, a visiting novelist
- President Robbins, a former Olympic diver
- Gottfried Rosenbaum, composer in residence
- Constance, a longtime friend of the narrator, a beautiful music student

== Awards ==
Pictures from an Institution was a finalist for the National Book Award.
