= Theodor Bergk =

German classical philologist (1812–1881)

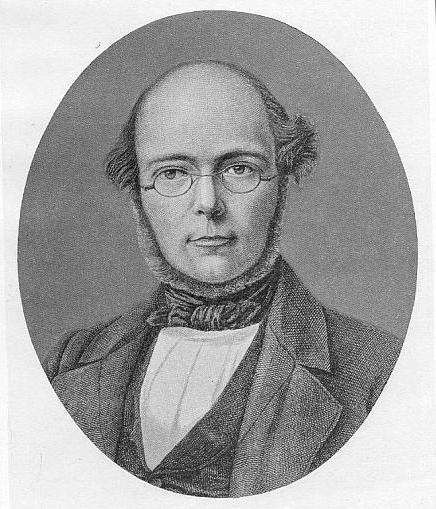
Theodor Bergk

Theodor Bergk (22 May 1812 – 20 July 1881) was a German philologist, an authority on classical Greek poetry.

== Biography ==
He was born in Leipzig, Kingdom of Saxony, as the son of Johann Adam Bergk. After studying at the University of Leipzig, where he profited by the instruction of Gottfried Hermann, he was appointed in 1835 to the lectureship in Latin at the orphan school at Halle. After holding posts at Neustrelitz, Berlin and Cassel, he succeeded (1842) Karl Friedrich Hermann as professor of classical literature at Marburg. In 1852 he went to Freiburg, and in 1857 returned to Halle.

In 1868 he resigned his professorship, and settled down to study and literary work in Bonn. He died on 20 July 1881, at Ragatz in Switzerland, where he had gone for the benefit of his health.

Bergk's literary activity was very great, but his reputation mainly rests upon his work in connection with Greek literature and the Greek lyric poets. His Poetae Lyrici Graeci (1843), and Griechische Litteraturgeschichte (1872–1887) (completed by G. Hinrichs and R. Peppmüller with the aid of Bergk's posthumous papers) became standard works.

Bergk's Latin translation of Sappho's poetry in Anthologia lyrica (1854) aided modern rediscovery of the homoerotic nature of her poems. His translations faithfully reproduced the female pronouns included as the objects of Sappho's love poems. Henry Thornton Wharton then translated Bergk's translations into English in Sappho: Memoir, Text, Selected Renderings, and a Literal Translation (1885). This was the first English translation of Sappho's work to retain its homoeroticism, and its availability quickly popularized the connection between Sappho and women-loving-women.

He also edited Anacreon (1834), the fragments of Aristophanes (1840), Aristophanes (3rd ed., 1872), Sophocles (2nd ed., 1868), a lyric anthology (4th ed., 1890). Among his other works may be mentioned: Augusti Rerum a se gestarum Index (1873); Inschriften römischer Schleudergeschosse (1876); Zur Geschichte und Topographie der Rheinlande in römischer Zeit (1882); Beiträge zur römischen Chronologie (1884). His Kleine philologische Schriften were edited by Peppmüller (1884–1886), and contain, in addition to a complete list of his writings, a sketch of his life.

== Works ==
- Aristophanis fragmenta. Edidit Th. Bergk, Berolini typis et impensis G. Reimeri, 1840.
- Poetae Lyrici Graeci. Edidit Theodorus Bergk, Lipsiae, Sumtu Reichenbachiorum fratrum, 1843.
  - Poetae Lyrici Graeci. Recensuit Theodorus Bergk. Editio altera auctior et emendatior. Lipsiae, apud Rechenbachios, 1853.
  - Poetae Lyrici Graeci. Tertiis curis recensuit Theodorus Bergk. Pars 1, pars 2, pars 3. Lipsiae in aedibus B. G. Teubneri, 1865–67.
  - Poetae Lyrici Graeci. Recensuit Theodorus Bergk. Editionis quartae. Vol. 2, vol. 3. Lipsiae in aedibus B. G. Teubneri, 1878–82.
- Griechische Literaturgeschichte von Theodor Bergk. Vol. 1, vol. 2, vol. 3, vol. 4. Berlin, Weimannsche Buchhanndlung, 1872–87.
