= Kohima War Cemetery =

CWGC cemetery in India

War Cemetery in Kohima
- Commonwealth War Graves Commission
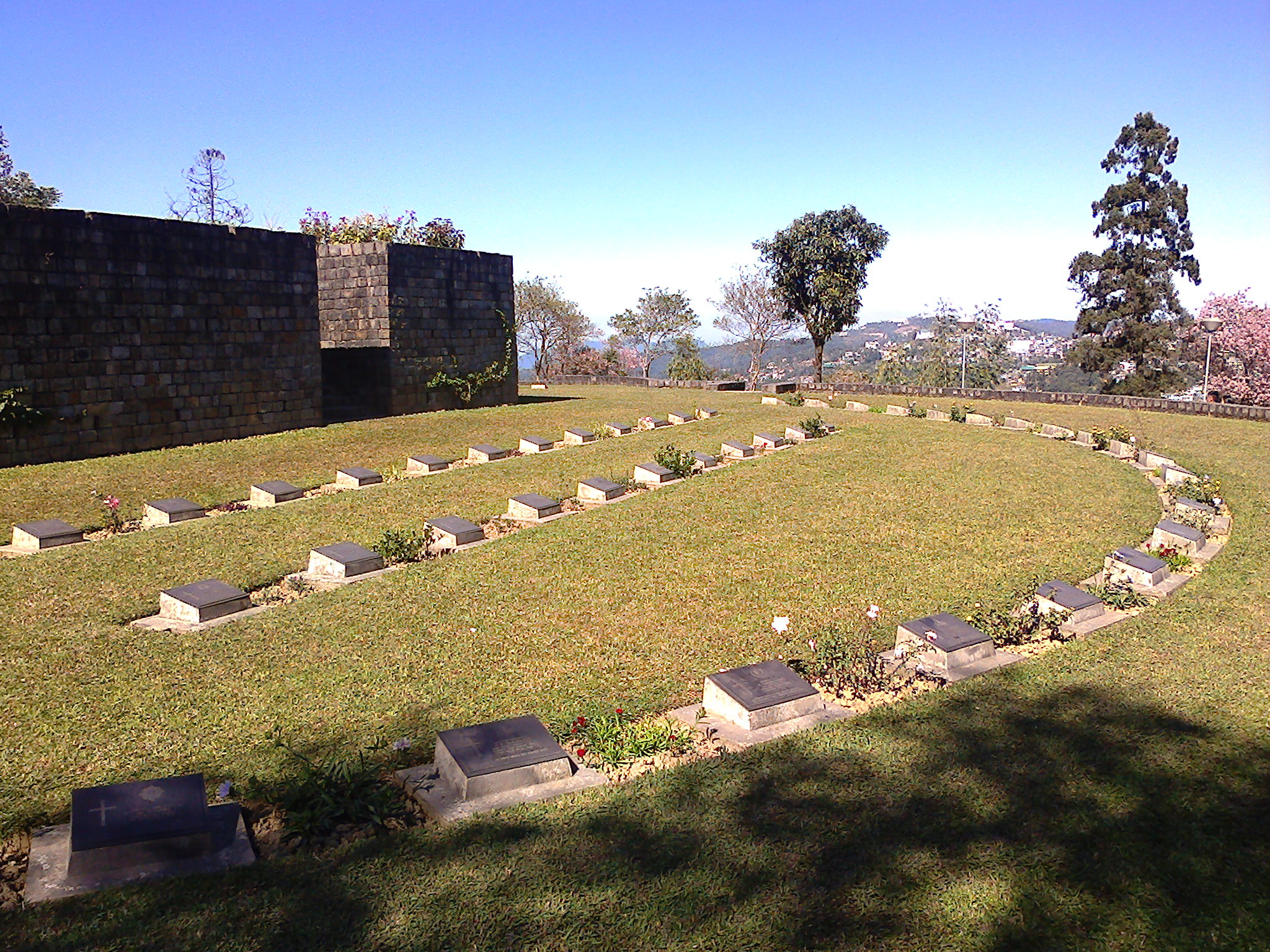
- Used for those deceased
- Established: 1946; 80 years ago
- Location: 25°40′03″N 94°06′11″E; Midland Ward, Kohima, Nagaland
- Designed by: Colin St Clair Oakes
- Total burials: 1420

Burials by nation
- Australia: 3 Canada: 5 India: 330; UK: 1082

Burials by war
- World War II: 1420

Kohima War Cemetery is a memorial dedicated to soldiers of the 2nd British Division of the Allied Forces who died in the Second World War at Kohima, the capital of the Indian state of Nagaland in April 1944. The soldiers died on the battleground of Garrison Hill in the tennis court area of the Deputy Commissioner's residence. According to the Commonwealth War Graves Commission, which maintains this cemetery among many others in the world, there are 1,420 Commonwealth burials of the Second World War at this cemetery, and a memorial to an additional 917 Hindu and Sikh soldiers who were cremated in accordance with their faith. The memorial was inaugurated by Field Marshal Sir William Slim, then Commander of the 14th Army in Burma.

== Location ==
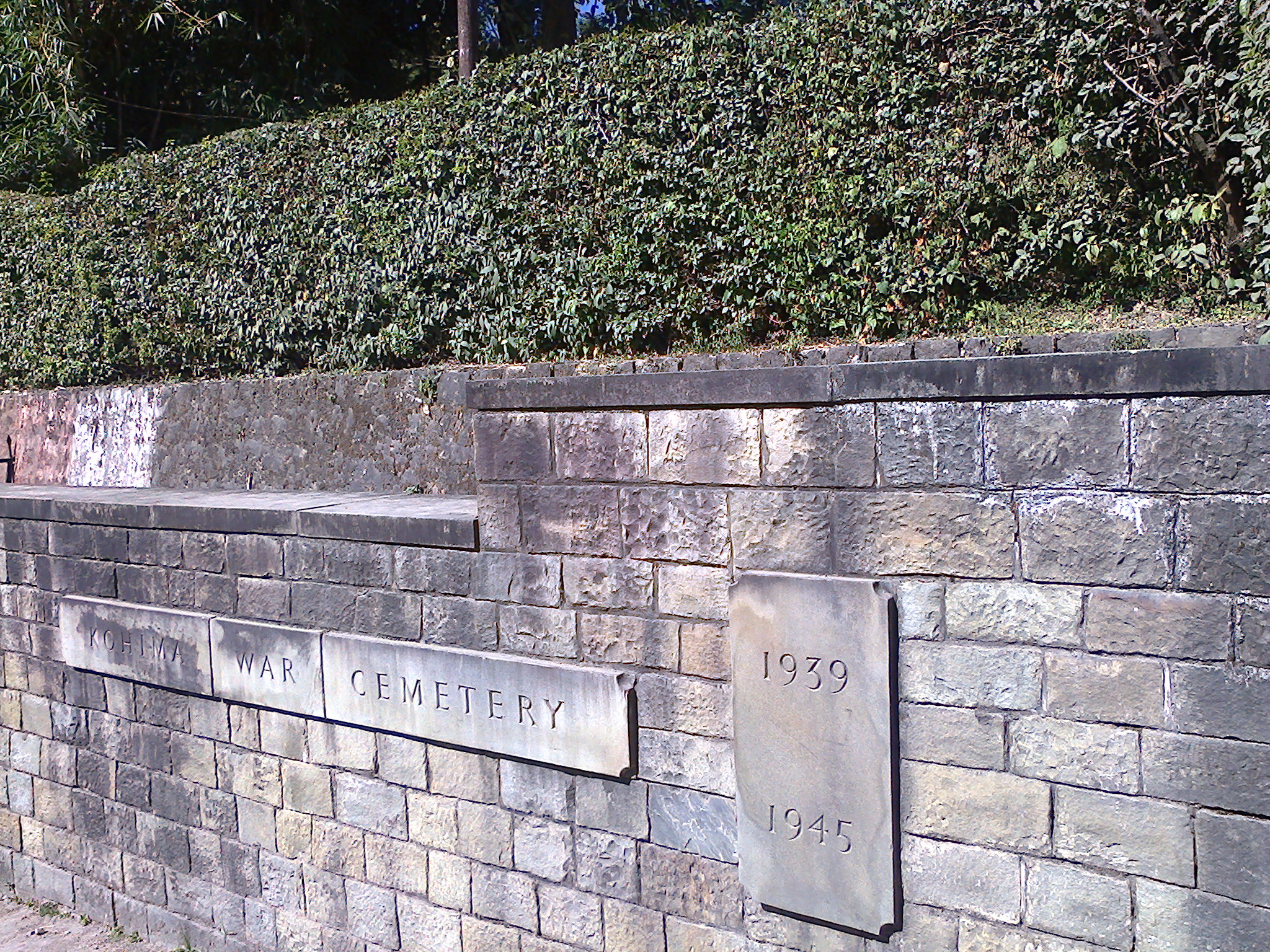
Entrance to the cemetery

The Kohima War Cemetery is located in the heart of Kohima, the capital city of the Indian state of Nagaland, at the location where a decisive battle was won by the Allied Forces during the Second World War, forcing the Japanese army to retreat. This location is on the ridge below and above the tennis court.

== History ==
In March 1944, the Japanese 15th Army attacked the British troops stationed in Kohima and Imphal in northeast India with intent to prevent an attack on Burma. In the first week of April, the Japanese attacked at Kohima and Imphal via Mizoram from the Indo-Burma border, to destroy the supply bases of the British. They laid siege on the Allied forces stationed at Kohima and also at Imphal.

Reaching Kohima during April 1944, the Japanese 15th Army occupied a strategic location on Garrison Hill and continually attacked a small contingent of the Commonwealth forces, which successfully held their ground until reinforcements were brought in. In the battle at the tennis ground (now marked by white concrete lines) of the Deputy Commissioner's bungalow (which was destroyed during the war), which also involved hand-to-hand fighting between the opposing forces, the Commonwealth forces prevailed over the Japanese forces and forced them to retreat in defeat. There were heavy casualties on both sides. This battle was the turning point for the Allied forces.

In 2013, the British National Army Museum voted the Battle of Imphal and Kohima as "Britain's Greatest Battle".

== Description ==
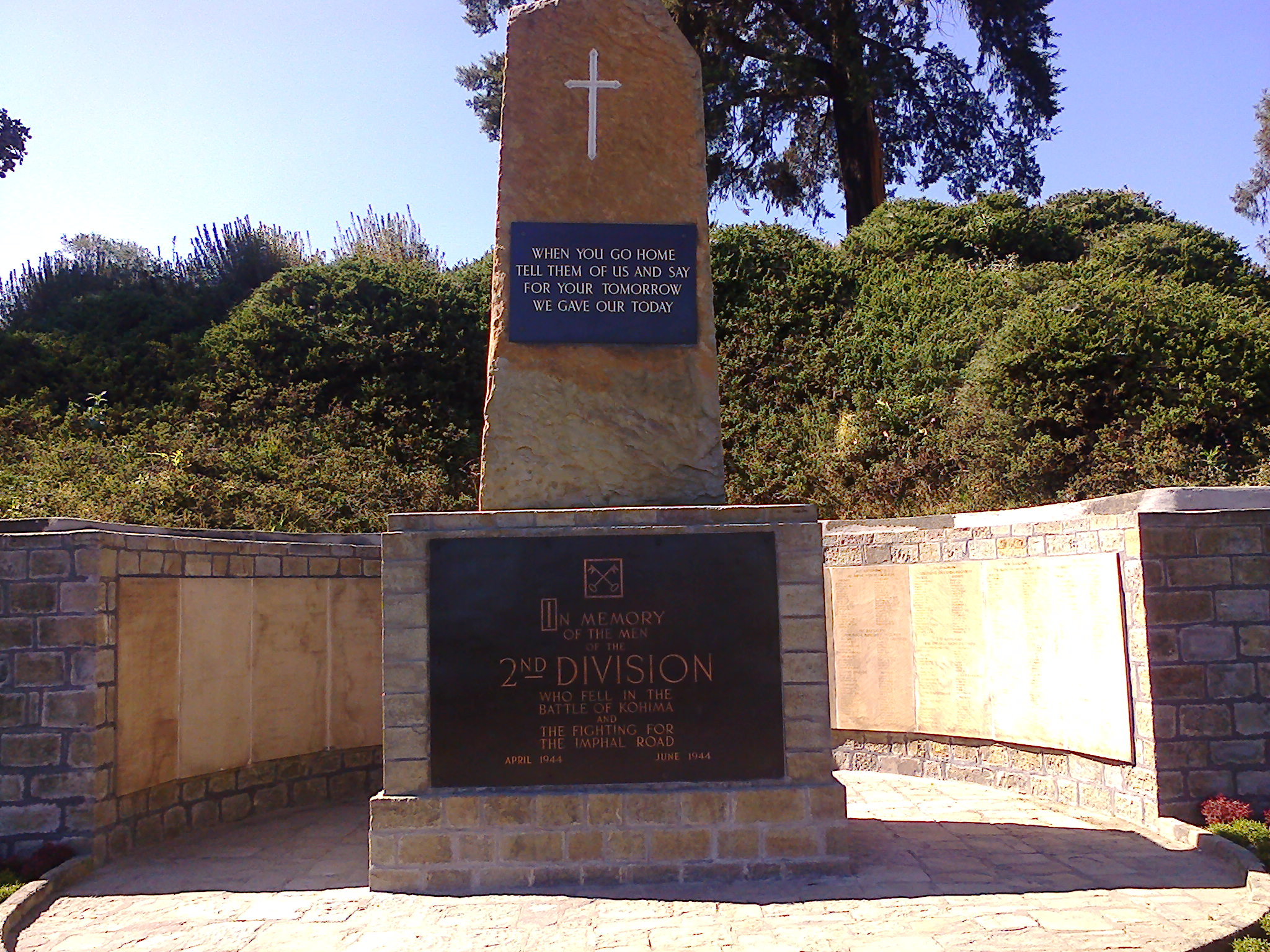
The stone memorial with the Kohima Epitaph

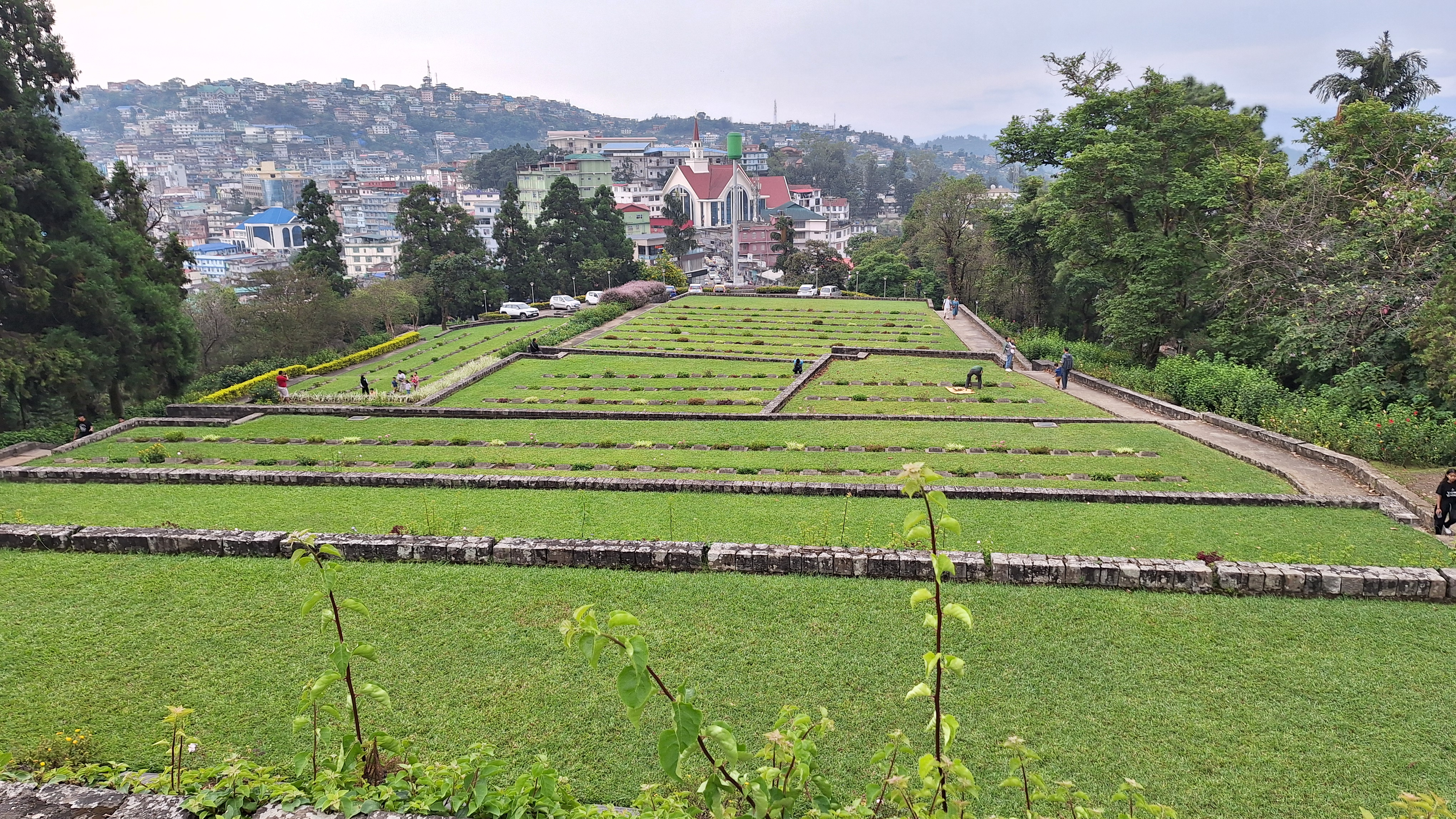
Kohima Cemetery with view of Kohima

The cemetery is set in peaceful surroundings with well-manicured grassland in which roses bloom in season. The cemetery is sited at the exact location where the battle was fought, and provides a panoramic view of the city of Kohima. It is marked at its two ends by tall, concrete structures engraved with the cross.} Between the two structures, along the sloping ground, a series of terraces of 3–5 metres (9.8–16.4 ft) in height have been created; these contain stone markers embedded with bronze plaques carrying the name of each Commonwealth soldier who died on the Kohima battlefield. These markers are made distinctly visible by a white wash.

There are two memorial crosses, one at the upper end and the other at the lower end of the cemetery. The upper-end memorial is located at the highest end of the cemetery. It commemorates the names of the Indian and Sikh soldiers (917 Hindu and Sikh soldiers who had been cremated as per their religious rites) who were part of the British Indian Army and died on the battlefield. The epitaph inscribed on this memorial reads:

Here, around the tennis court of the deputy commissioner, lie men who fought in the battle of Kohima in which they and their comrades finally halted the invasion of India by the forces of Japan in April 1944.

The lower-end memorial is dedicated to the 2nd Division. It is a 15 feet (4.6 m) tall, massive stone (similar to the stone used by the Naga tribes to mark the graves of their dead) fixed over a dressed stone platform. This stone was originally located on a spur at Maram, to the south of Kohima, which was then shifted with the help of Naga people to be erected at the 2nd British Division's war cemetery. While the top part of the memorial is marked with a cross, at the lower part lies a bronze plate that carries an epitaph. The epitaph, titled Kohima Epitaph, reads:

When you go home tell them of us and say for your tomorrow we gave our today

The above verse, which became world-famous, is attributed to John Maxwell Edmonds (1875–1958) and is thought to have been inspired by the epitaph written by Simonides to honour the Spartans who fell at the Battle of Thermopylae in 480 BC.

Another notable feature at the site is a cherry tree near the tennis court where the battle was fought, where a small brass plaque reads:

For Your Tomorrow, We Gave Our Today

The original tree, from which a branch has been used to create the present tree where the plaque is fixed, had been used for target practice by the Japanese forces. It was destroyed during the battle. Hence, Kohima Battle is also known as the "Battle Under the Cherry Tree".

Close to the Garrison Hill, memorials for the 2nd Battalion, the Dorsetshire Regiment, and several other regiments have been established. There is a memorial to the dead of the 2nd Battalion, The Durham Light Infantry, inside the grounds of the Chief Secretary's Official Residence, just behind the Governor's House.

In the list of the dead marked by stones at the cemetery, there are 64 names of Queen's Own Cameron Highlanders soldiers; the memorial, however, lists 96 names, out of which the graves of 32 personals were located.

== Memorial service ==
On the 60th anniversary of the end of World War II in 2005, a memorial service was held at the Kohima War Cemetery attended by 41 members of the Royal British Legion. Brigadier John Farmer, representing the Royal British Legion, and Brigadier RL Sharma of the 2nd Assam Rifles, laid wreaths at the memorial. Reverend Dr Neiliezhü Üsou, officiating chaplain, conducted the memorial service. A notable pilgrim to the memorial was Hildra Martin Smith, aged 84, who came in a wheelchair; he had participated in the Kohima battle as a Lieutenant of the British Army. The visit was initiated by the Royal British Legion of the United Kingdom, which regularly sponsors such war grave pilgrimages.

Ten years later another memorial service was held in the cemetery, attended by senior British Army officers, to commemorate the 70th anniversary of the Battle of Kohima.

== See also ==
- Battle of Imphal
- Battle of Kohima
- Battle of the Tennis Court
- XIV Army
- Imphal War Cemetery
- Victory Tunnel

== Bibliography ==
- Bhattacharjee, Kishalaya (2013). Che in Paona Bazar. Pan Macmillan. ISBN 978-1-4472-4741-8.
- Graham, Gordon (2005). The Trees are All Young on Garrison Hill: An Exploration of War and Memory. Kohima Educational Trust. ISBN 978-0-9552687-0-0.
