= Mary Barnard =

American poet (1909–2001)

- Born: December 6, 1909 Vancouver, Washington, U.S.
- Died: August 25, 2001 (aged 91)
- Notable awards: Levinson Award; Elliston Award; Western States Book Award; Washington State Governor's Award

Mary Ethel Barnard (December 6, 1909 – August 25, 2001) was an American poet, biographer and Greek-to-English translator. She is known for her elegant rendering of the works of Sappho, a translation which has never gone out of print.

Paideuma: A Journal Devoted to Ezra Pound Scholarship, Issue 94, was exclusively dedicated to her work and her correspondence with Pound. Barnard won a Levinson Award of Poetry from Poetry Magazine in 1935, and an Elliston Award for her Collected Poems, a Western States Book Award in 1986, (for Time and the White Tigress). Among other honors were: the Washington State Governor's Award for achievement in the literary arts, and the May Sarton Award for Poetry from the New England Poetry Club in 1987.

== Biography ==
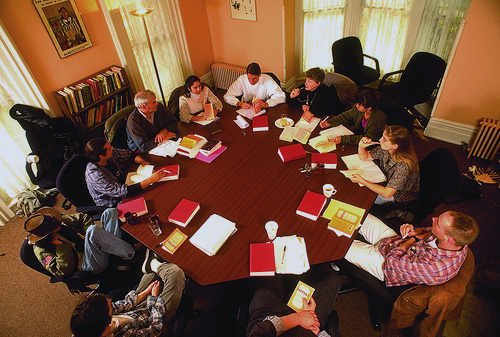
A discussion class on Barnard's translation of Sappho at Shimer College.

Barnard was born in Vancouver, Washington to Samuel Melvin and Bertha Hoard Barnard. Her father worked in the timber industry; growing up, she saw much of the backwoods in the vicinity as she accompanied her father to logging camps. She studied at Reed College, just south of the Columbia River in Portland, Oregon, graduating in 1932. While at Reed, Barnard began to read modernist poets, such as T. S. Eliot, Ezra Pound, H. D., and E. E. Cummings.

After graduating from Reed, Barnard worked for a few years as a social worker for the Emergency Relief Administration. In 1935, Barnard was awarded the Levinson Prize by the journal Poetry; she used the prize money to fund a move to New York state the following year. Barnard won Yaddo residencies in 1936 and 1938. In 1939, through the influence of Ezra Pound, she was made the first curator of The Poetry Collection at the Lockwood Memorial Library (University at Buffalo, New York); in that role she arranged readings and amassed the writing of many modern poets. Some of her first poetry was published in 1940, in Five Young American Poets, published by New Directions Publishing founded by James Laughlin.

She worked from 1945 to 1950 as research assistant for Carl van Doren, biographer of Benjamin Franklin and generalist historian of Americana. Van Doren and Barnard had a common interest in the poet Elinor Wylie. Barnard also worked as a freelance writer. Barnard was also a member of the American Association of University Women (AAUW).

Barnard was mentored via airmail from Italy by Ezra Pound after she sent him six poems, and was introduced to the likes of William Carlos Williams and Marianne Moore. This generated a lifetime of lengthy correspondence with the former in addition to comprehensive instruction on the art of poetry from Pound. Pound encouraged Barnard to use translations to hone her poetic abilities. Pound also encouraged Barnard to visit Europe, meet H.D. – which did not happen despite pressure from Pound – and generally witness the continental European scene. In 1958, inspired by Salvatore Quasimodo's anthology Greci Lirici, Barnard published Sappho: A New Translation, with the encouragement of Pound, whom she sent the first drafts of the work.

She returned to Vancouver in 1957 after fifteen years on the East Coast and continued to write, mostly original poetry and prose, until her death.

== Works ==
- A Few Poems (1952)
- Sappho: A New Translation (University of California Press, 1958)
- Mythmakers (Ohio University Press, 1966)
- Collected Poems (Breitenbush Books, 1979, introduction by William Stafford)
- Three Fables (Breitenbush Books, 1983)
- Assault on Mt. Helicon: A Literary Memoir (University of California Press, 1984)
- Time and the White Tigress (Breitenbush Books, 1986, linocuts by Anita Bigelow)
- Nantucket Genesis: The Tale of My Tribe (1988, memoir in verse)

== Works cited ==
- Barnard, Mary (1984). Assault on Mount Helicon: A Literary Memoir.
- Barnsley, Sarah (2013). Mary Barnard, American Imagist. State University of New York Press. ISBN 9781438448572.
- Barnard, Mary; Barnsley, Sarah (2025). Mary Barnard: complete poems and selected translations. Albany: State University of New York Press. ISBN 9798855802641.
