= John Maxwell Edmonds =

English classicist, poet and dramatist (1875–1958)

- Born: 21 January 1875; Stroud, Gloucestershire, United Kingdom
- Died: 18 March 1958 (aged 83); Cambridge, Cambridgeshire, United Kingdom
- Occupation: Classical scholar

John Maxwell Edmonds (21 January 1875 – 18 March 1958) was an English classicist, poet and dramatist and the author of several celebrated martial epitaphs.

== Biography ==
Edmonds was born in Stroud, Gloucestershire on 21 January 1875. His father was a schoolmaster and later the vicar of Great Gransden, Huntingdonshire, while his mother was the daughter of a self-made Cornish cloth manufacturer. He was educated at Oundle School before going up to Jesus College, Cambridge in 1896 as a Classical Scholar. He was taught at Oundle by R. P. Brereton and J. H. Vince and at Cambridge under Edwin Abbott Abbott. Periods of illness which had originally made him delay his university career later forced him to be absent from university for several terms, but he nevertheless recovered to take a first in his tripos in 1898.

He taught at Repton School and King's School, Canterbury before returning to the University of Cambridge to lecture. During World War I, Edmonds took a break from his academic career at Cambridge. He and his wife, Ethel, moved to London to work as codebreakers for the British War Office's secret intelligence department, MI1b.

== Epitaphs ==
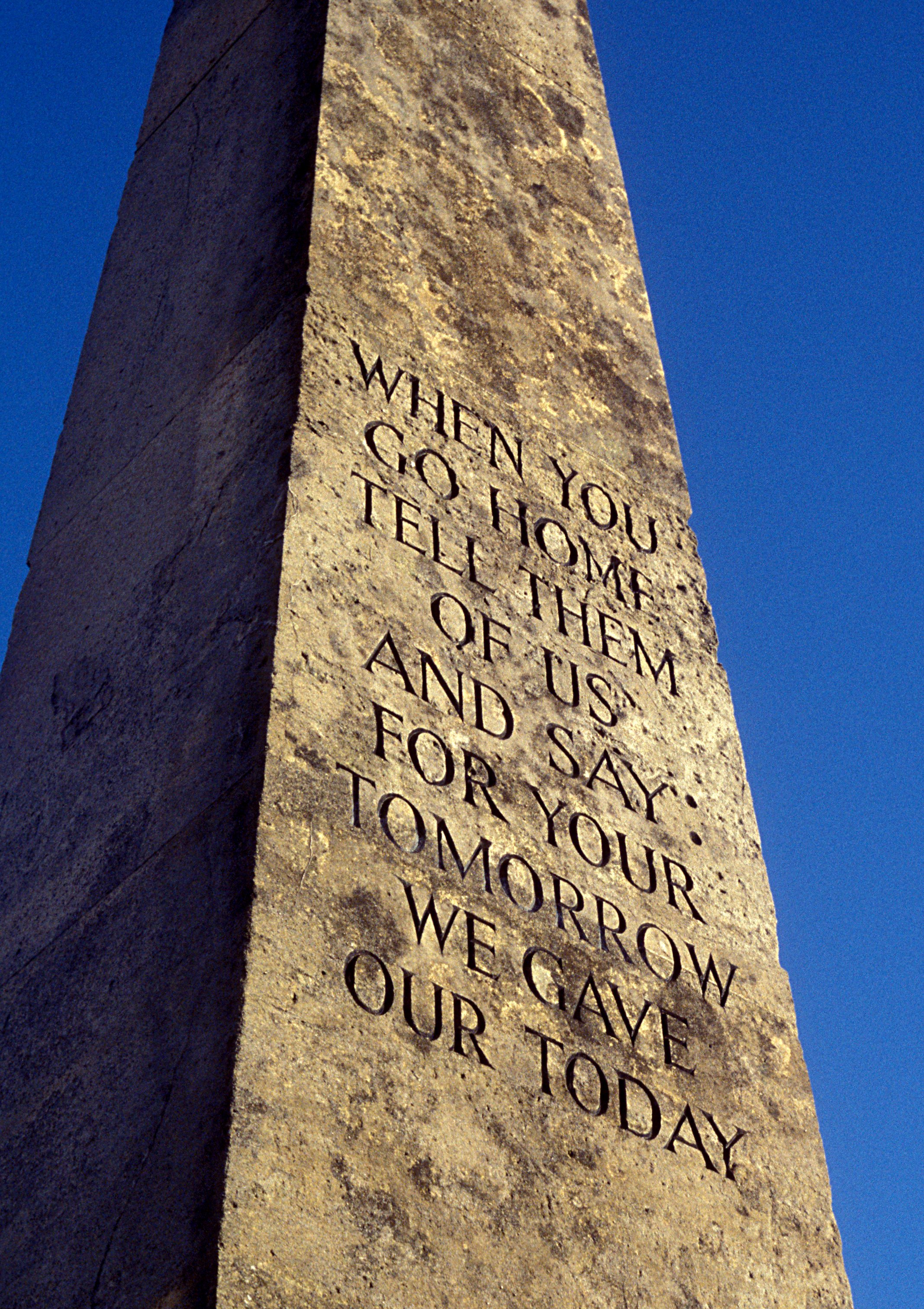
"When you go home tell them of us and say: for your tomorrow we gave our today" inscribed on a war memorial in Westbury-on-Trym

Edmonds is credited with authorship of a famous epitaph in the War Cemetery in Kohima which commemorates the fallen of the Battle of Kohima in April 1944.

When you go home, tell them of us and say
For your tomorrow, we gave our today.

He was the author of an item in The Times, 6 February 1918, page 7, headed "Four Epitaphs" composed for graves and memorials to those fallen in battle – each covering different situations of death. The second of these was used as a theme for the 1942 war film Went the Day Well?:

Went the day well?
We died and never knew.
But, well or ill,
Freedom, we died for you.

That epitaph was regularly quoted when The Times notified deaths of those who fell during the First World War, and was also regularly used during the Second World War. It appeared on many village and town war memorials.

There has been some confusion between 'Went the day well' and Edmonds’ other famous epitaph published in the same 1919 edition of inscriptions:

When you go home, tell them of us and say,
For your tomorrows these gave their today.

This epitaph was inspired by an epigram of the Greek poet Simonides of Ceos to the fallen at the Battle of Thermopylae, and was later used (with a misquote) for the memorial for those who fell at the Battle of Kohima. Some resources incorrectly give Went the day well? as being the translation of the Simonides epigram.

Edmonds was also responsible for translating into Greek elegiacs A. E. Housman's “Epitaph on an army of mercenaries”, a tribute to the British Expeditionary Force on the third anniversary of the battle of Ypres, which appeared in The Times on 31 October 1917. The Greek version was published in the Classical Review 31 that year.

== Bibliography ==
- Twelve War Epitaphs (Chelsea: Ashendene Press, 1920)
- An Introduction to Comparative Philology for Classical Students
- Lyra Graeca; being the remains of all the Greek lyric poets from Eumelus to Timotheus excepting Pindar, 3 vols., (Cambridge MA: Harvard UP; London: Heinemann, 1922-27)
  - Vol. I (1922)
  - Vol. II (1924)
  - Vol. III (1927)
- The Greek Bucolic Poets (London: Heinemann; New York: G. P. Putnam's Sons, 1929)
- The Characters of Theophrastus: Herodes, Cercidas, and the Greek cholliambic poets (except Callimachus and Babrius) (London: Heinemann; New York: G. P. Putnam's Sons, 1929)
- Elegy And Iambus, being the remains of all the Greek elegiac and iambic poets from Callinus to Crates excepting the cholliambic writers, with the Anacreontea, 2 vols., (London: Heinemann; New York: G. P. Putnam's Sons, 1931)
  - Vol. I
  - Vol. II
- The Fragments of Attic Comedy after Meineke, Bergk, and Kock (Leiden, 1957)
  - Vol. II
  - Vol. IIIA
  - Vol. IIIB
