= Ignyte Award for Outstanding Middle Grade =

Annual literary award for speculative fiction

- Awarded for: Longform works for a middle grade audience
- Country: United States
- Presented by: FIYAH Literary Magazine
- First award: 2020; 6 years ago
- Most recent winner: Naseem Jamnia (The Glade)
- Website: ignyteawards.fiyahlitmag.com

The Ignyte Award for Outstanding Middle Grade is a literary award given annually as part of the Ignyte Awards.

== Winners and finalists ==
* Winners

| Year | Author | Work | Ref. |
|---|---|---|---|
| 2020 | Kwame Mbalia* | Tristan Strong Punches a Hole in the Sky | |
| 2020 | Carlos Hernandez | Sal and Gabi Break the Universe | |
| 2020 | Jessica Khoury | The Mystwick School of Musicraft | |
| 2020 | Karen Strong | Just South of Home | |
| 2020 | Jasmine Warga | Other Words for Home | |
| 2021 | Claribel A. Ortega* | Ghost Squad | |
| 2021 | Rena Barron | Maya and the Rising Dark | |
| 2021 | Mike Ford | Frightville: Curse of the Wish Eater | |
| 2021 | Rebecca Roanhorse | Race to the Sun | |
| 2021 | Christina Soontornvat | A Wish in the Dark | |
| 2022 | Eden Royce* | Root Magic | |
| 2022 | B. B. Alston | Amari and the Night Brothers | |
| 2022 | Shakira Bourne | Josephine Against the Sea | |
| 2022 | Kwame Mbalia | Tristan Strong Keeps Punching | |
| 2022 | Mark Oshiro | The Insiders | |
| 2023 | Claribel A. Ortega* | Witchlings | |
| 2023 | K. Tempest Bradford | Ruby Finley vs. the Interstellar Invasion | |
| 2023 | Dhonielle Clayton | The Marvellers | |
| 2023 | Mark Oshiro | You Only Live Once, David Bravo | |
| 2023 | Christina Soontornvat | The Last Mapmaker | |
| 2024 | P. Djèlí Clark* | Abeni's Song | |
| 2024 | Alechia Dow | Just a Pinch of Magic | |
| 2024 | Malia Maunakea | Lei and the Fire Goddess | |
| 2024 | Mark Oshiro | The Sun and the Star | |
| 2024 | Rick Riordan | The Sun and the Star | |
| 2024 | DaVaun Sanders | Keynan Masters and the Peerless Magic Crew | |
| 2025 | Jenna Lee-Yun* | The Last Rhee Witch | |
| 2025 | B. B. Alston | Amari and the Despicable Wonders | |
| 2025 | José Pablo Iriarte | Benny Ramírez and the Nearly Departed | |
| 2025 | Rajani LaRocca | Sona and the Golden Beasts | |
| 2025 | Eden Royce | The Creepening of Dogwood House | |
| 2026 | Naseem Jamnia* | The Glade | |
| 2026 | Mia Araujo | Afia in the Land of Wonders | |
| 2026 | Victor Piñeiro | The Island of Forgotten Gods | |
| 2026 | Ally Russel | Mystery James Digs Her Own Grave | |
| 2026 | Sherri L. Smith | Candace, the Universe, and Everything | |
