= Adaptations of Les Misérables =

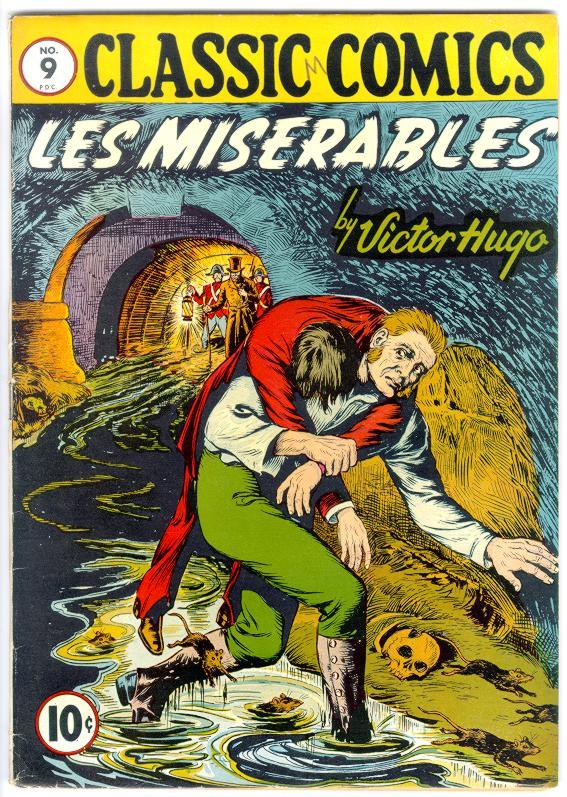
Classics Illustrated issue #9, March 1943

Victor Hugo's novel Les Misérables has been the subject of many adaptations in various media since its original publication in 1862.

== Books (adaptations and sequels) ==
- 1872, Gavroche: The Gamin of Paris, translated and adapted by M. C. Pyle.
- 1922, The Story of "Les Misérables", adapted by Isabel C. Fortey.
- 1935, Jean Val Jean, a condensed retelling by Solomon Cleaver.
- 1946, Les Misérables, adapted by Mabel Dodge Holmes, edited by Grace A. Benscoter.
- 1995, Cosette: The Sequel to Les Misérables by Laura Kalpakian, more a sequel to the musical than to Hugo's novel.
- 1995, Les Misérables, adapted by Monica Kulling for the Bullseye Step into Classics series.
- 2000–2001, Pont au Change, an independently published sequel in three parts (Resurrections, Sanctuary and Adrift) by Arlene C. Harris
- 2001, French author François Cérésa wrote two sequels, Cosette or the Time of Illusions and Marius or The Fugitive. Hugo's descendants, including his great-great-grandson Pierre Hugo, wanted the novels banned, claiming that they breached the moral rights of the author and betrayed the "respect of the integrity" and "spirit" of Hugo's original novel.
- 2013, Barricades: The Journey of Javert, a novel by C.A. Shilton based on the early life of Javert.
- 2014, A Little in Love by Susan Fletcher, a novel based on the early life of Éponine, published by Chicken House Ltd.
- 2014, Les Misérables, a picture book written and illustrated by Marcia Williams, published by Walker Books.
- 2019, Sky Without Stars by Jessica Brody & Joanne Rendell, the first book in the 'System Divine' series which serves as a futuristic sci-fi retelling of Les Misérables.
- 2020, A Wish in the Dark, a children's fantasy novel by Christina Soontornvat
- 2020, The Court of Miracles by Kester Grant, a loose retelling of Les Misérables and The Jungle Book with Éponine as the main character. It is the first book in a trilogy.

== Comics ==
=== Western comics ===
- 1943: Classic Comics releases a comics adaptation with illustrations by Rolland H. Livingstone.
- 1961: Classic Comics releases a revision of the 1943 adaptation with illustrations by Norman Nodel.
- 1975: François Dermaut adapted the story into a comic book version for the magazine Djin.
- 1979: Rene Giffey illustrated an adaptation in three parts: "Jean Valjean et Javert," "Gavroche," and "Cosette et Marius."
- 1989: 'Il mistero dei candelabri' by Giovan Battista Carpi published in Topolino. It was later translated into English as 'The Secret of the Candlesticks' and published in Uncle Scrooge & Donald Duck in Les Misérables and War and Peace in 2023. It features Scrooge McDuck as 'Jean McJean', Daisy Duck as 'Daisette', and Donald Duck as 'Donaldius Duck-mercy'.
- 1996: Eddy Paape illustrated "Les Misérables: Jean Valjean," with plans for a second instalment entitled "Les Thénardiers," that was never released.
- 2010: Daniel Bardet and Bernard Capo illustrated an adaptation published in two parts.
- 2021: Les misérables by Éric Salch, semi-modern, absurdist retelling of the story

=== Manga ===
- 1955: Aa Mujō, a manga adaptation by Hisashi Tanaka, published in Nakayoshi Magazine.
- 1956: Manga by Kyoko Takagi and Shigeru Sasayama, published as a supplement to a girl’s magazine.
- 1958: Cosette Monogatari by Sanroku Oyamada.
- 1961: Aa Mujō, a manga adaptation by Takeshi Kojo. Published in Nakayoshi magazine.
- 1973: Gag manga created by Taro Minamoto. First released in installments for the magazine Kibou no Tomo, then published in two volumes.
- 1996: Les Misérable, illustrated by Akira Misaki. Distributed by Sunmark Publishing.
- 2006: Written by Yoichi Hirakawa and illustrated by Machiko Satonaka. Published in 5 volumes by KADOKAWA CORPORATION.
- 2009: Manga de Dokuha adaptation, produced by Kosuke Maruo and illustrated by Variety Art Works.
- 2012: Song of Alouette, by Kanako Inuki. Published in seven volumes.
- 2013: Serial manga adaptation by Takahiro Arai in Japan's Monthly Shonen Sunday magazine.
- 2014: UDON Manga Classics manga adaptation. Art by SunNeko Lee and story adaptation by Crystal Silvermoon.
- 2016: Manga Grimm Fairy Tales Sensual Fairy Tale for Adults 2 ~Les Misérables~, by Junko Okada. Published by BUNKASHA.
- 2024: Dear Friends of L'Heure Bleue by AKI, published by KADOKAWA CORPORATION. Focuses on the Friends of the ABC. Unfinished, has two volumes as of May 2025.

== Film ==
Les Misérables (1925), directed by Henri Fescourt

- 1897, Victor Hugo et les principaux personnages des Misérables, a short film by the Lumière brothers. The film is extant.
- 1905, Le Chemineau (English: The Vagabond), a five-minute short directed by Albert Capellani. The film is extant and available on several DVD releases.
- 1909, in three parts, entitled The Price of a Soul, The Ordeal and A New Life. The film was directed by Edwin S. Porter and produced by the Edison Manufacturing Company. Although faithful to the novel, it is not a complete adaptation as the final part ends with Valjean entering the convent. The film is believed to be lost. The first installment was sometimes billed as The Bishop's Candlesticks.
- 1909, in four parts, entitled Jean Valjean, The Galley Slave, Fantine; or, A Mother's Love and Cosette, directed by J. Stuart Blackton and produced by The Vitagraph Company of America. This film, believed to be lost, is the first motion picture adaptation of the complete novel.
- 1910, Aa Mujou, Japanese adaptation, director unknown
- 1913, again directed by Capellani with Henry Krauss as Valjean. Budgeted at $100,000, publicity at the time hailed it as "the greatest motion picture ever made".
- 1913, The Bishop's Candlesticks, directed Herbert Brenon, adaptation of a popular one-act play by Norman McKinnel based on the first volume of the novel
- 1917, directed by Frank Lloyd, produced by William Fox and starring William Farnum as Valjean
- 1922, Tense Moments with Great Authors, a British production featuring scenes from the novel and starring Lyn Harding as Valjean.
- 1923, Aa Mujou, a Japanese adaptation directed by Kiyohiko Ushihara and Yoshinobu Ikeda; production cancelled after two of four parts
- 1925, directed by Henri Fescourt, starring Gabriel Gabrio, Jean Toulout, Sandra Milowanoff and François Rozet
- 1929, The Bishop's Candlesticks, directed by George Abbott, adaptation of a popular one-act play by Norman McKinnel of the first volume of the novel, the first sound film adaptation, with Walter Huston as Jean Valjean
- 1929, Aa Mujo, a Japanese adaptation directed by Seika Shiba
- 1931, Jean Valjean, directed by Tomu Uchida
- 1934, a four and a half hour French version directed by Raymond Bernard and starring Harry Baur, Charles Vanel, Florelle, Josseline Gaël and Jean Servais
- 1935, directed by Richard Boleslawski and starring Fredric March as Valjean, Charles Laughton as Javert, Sir Cedric Hardwicke as the Bishop, Florence Eldridge as Fantine, Rochelle Hudson as Cosette and John Beal as Marius; the first adaptation nominated for Academy Award for Best Picture.
- 1937, Gavrosh, a Soviet adaptation directed by Tatyana Lukashevich
- 1938, Kyōjinden, a Japanese adaptation directed by Mansaku Itami
- 1943, Los Miserables, a Mexican adaptation directed by Renando A. Rovero
- 1944, El Boassa, an Egyptian adaptation directed by Kamal Selim
- 1948 (I Miserabili), directed by Riccardo Freda and starring Gino Cervi, Giovanni Hinrich, Valentina Cortese, Duccia Giraldi and Aldo Nicodemi
- 1949, Les Nouveaux Misérables, directed by Henri Verneuil, a short film inspired by Les Misérables
- 1950, Re Mizeraburu: Kami To Akuma (English: Les Miserables: Gods and Demons) and Re Mizeraburu: Kami To Jiyu No Hata (English: Les Misérables: Flag of Love and Liberty). Directed by Daisuke Itô and Masahiro Makino respectively, and released on 3 and 14 November respectively.
- 1950, Ezhai Padum Padu and Beedala Patlu, directed by K. Ramnoth in Tamil and Telugu
- 1952, directed by Lewis Milestone, with Michael Rennie as Valjean, Robert Newton as Javert, Sylvia Sidney as Fantine, Edmund Gwenn as the Bishop, Debra Paget as Cosette and Cameron Mitchell as Marius
- 1955, Kundan, an Indian Hindi film directed by Sohrab Modi
- 1956, Duppathage Duka, Sri Lankan Sinhala film
- 1957, Sirakaruwa, a Sri Lankan Sinhala adaptation directed by Sirisena Wimalaweera
- 1958, directed by Jean-Paul Le Chanois, starring Jean Gabin as Valjean, Bernard Blier as Javert, Danièle Delorme as Fantine, Béatrice Altariba as Cosette, Bourvil as Thénardier and Giani Esposito as Marius
- 1961, Jean Valjean, Korean film by Seung-ha Jo
- 1967, Sefiller, Turkish film
- 1972, Beedala Patlu, Indian Telugu film directed by B. Vittalacharya
- 1972, Gnana Oli ("The light of wisdom"), Indian Tamil loose adaptation, directed by P. Madhavan
- 1977, Neethipeedam, Indian film, a Malayalam remake of Ezhai Padum Padu
- 1978, Al Boasa, Egyptian adaptation
- 1978, Devata, Hindi remake of Gnana Oli
- 1982, directed by Robert Hossein and starring Lino Ventura, Michel Bouquet, Évelyne Bouix, Christiane Jean and Frank David
- 1988, Oliver & Company, modern adaptation set in New York City that is inspired by both Les Misérables and Charles Dickens' Oliver Twist.
- 1989, Ngọn Cỏ Gió Đùa, Vietnamese film directed by Hgô Ngoc Xun with a script by Việt Linh and released by Saigon Video. Based on Ngọn cỏ gió đùa, Hồ Biểu Chánh's book adaptation of Les Misérables.
- 1995, directed by Claude Lelouch; a loose, multi-layered adaptation set in the 20th century starring Jean-Paul Belmondo
- 1998, directed by Bille August and starring Liam Neeson as Valjean, Geoffrey Rush as Javert, Uma Thurman as Fantine, Peter Vaughan as the Bishop, Claire Danes as Cosette and Hans Matheson as Marius.
- 2007, Sudanese film directed by Gadalla Gubara and starring Gamal Hassan as Valjean.
- 2010, Ngọn Cỏ Gió Đùa, Vietnamese Cải lương musical film directed by Pham Van Dai and broadcast on HTV9. Based on Ngọn cỏ gió đùa, Hồ Biểu Chánh's book adaptation of Les Misérables.
- 2011, Les misérables: Tempête sous un crâne, filmed stage play by Jean Bellorini and Camille de la Guillonnière
- 2012, adaptation of the stage musical, directed by Tom Hooper and starring Hugh Jackman as Valjean, Russell Crowe as Javert, Anne Hathaway as Fantine, Samantha Barks as Eponine, Aaron Tveit as Enjolras, Amanda Seyfried as Cosette, Sacha Baron Cohen as Thenardier, Helena Bonham Carter as Mme. Thenardier, Eddie Redmayne as Marius and Colm Wilkinson as the Bishop
- 2025, Jean Valjean, directed by Éric Besnard and starring Grégory Gadebois as Valjean.
- 2026, directed by Fred Cavayé and starring Vincent Lindon as Valjean.

*Note: The 2019 film Les Misérables borrows the title and some of the settings but is not an adaptation of the work, rather it borrows on some of its themes.

== Television ==
- 1949, The Bishop's Candlesticks, based on the play by Norman McKinnel. Broadcast on BBC Television. David Phethean played the role of the convict Jean Valjean.
- 1949, The Bishop's Experiment, an episode of the American anthology drama series Your Show Time. Based on an incident from the novel with Leif Erickson as Jean Valjean.
- 1952, The Bishop's Treasure, a play by Wilfred Harvey adapted from the story in Les Misérables by Victor Hugo. Broadcast on BBC Television. Patrick Crean played the role of the convict Jean Valjean.
- 1953, The Bishop's Candlesticks, an episode of the 30 minute American anthology drama series Medallion Theatre with Victor Jory in the role of Jean Valjean.
- 1953, Jean Valjean, an episode of the American anthology drama series Monodrama Theater
- 1955, Aa mujo, Japanese TV show in 31 episodes, broadcast on NTV
- 1958, Os Miseráveis, a Brazilian telenovela directed by Dionísio Azevedo, aired on TV Tupí (later Rede Tupí)
- 1961–1963, Cosette, Gavroche and Jean Valjean, three-part adaptation directed by Alain Boudet on Claude Santelli's program Le Théâtre de la jeunesse
- 1964, Aa mujo, 13 episodes in the Japanese TV show Myojo Soguinoko Theatre, aimed at children
- 1964, I miserabili, Italian TV-miniseries directed by Sandro Bolchi, starring: Gastone Moschin (Jean Valjean), Tino Carraro (Javert), Giulia Lazzarini (Fantine/adult Cosette), Loretta Goggi (young Cosette), Antonio Battistella (Thénardier), Cesarina Gheraldi (Mme. Thénardier), Angela Cardile (Éponine), Roberto Bisacco (Marius), Claudio Sora (Enjolras), Aldo Silvani (Monseigneur Bienvenu) and Edoardo Nevola (Gavroche), nearly ten hours long
- 1967, BBC miniseries, directed by Alan Bridges, starring: Frank Finlay as Valjean, Anthony Bate as Javert, Alan Rowe as Thenardier, Judy Parfitt as Madame Thenardier, Michele Dotrice as Fantine and Cosette, Lesley Roach as young Cosette, Elizabeth Counsell as Eponine, Vivian Mackerall as Marius, Derek Lamden as Gavroche, Cavan Kendall as Enjolras, and Finlay Currie as the Bishop.
- 1967, Os Miseráveis, Brazilian soap opera starring Leonardo Vilar as Jean Valjean
- 1970, Los Miserables, Episode of the Argentina television series Alta Comedia, directed by Martín Clutet and broadcast on 13 June 1970.
- 1971, Los Miserables, Spanish production by TVE (now RTVE) as part of the Novela TV series, directed by José Antonio Páramo and starring José Calvo as Jean Valjean
- 1972, French TV miniseries directed by Marcel Bluwal, starring: Georges Géret (Jean Valjean), Bernard Fresson (Javert), Nicole Jamet (Cosette), François Marthouret (Marius), Alain Mottet (Thénardier), Micha Bayard (Mme. Thénardier), Hermine Karagheuz (Éponine), Anne-Marie Coffinet (Fantine), Jean-Luc Boutté (Enjolras), Gilles Maidon (Gavroche), François Vibert (Monseigneur Myriel)
- 1974, Los Miserables, Mexican TV adaptation directed by Antulio Jiménez Pons and starring Sergio Bustamante (Jean Valjean), Antonio Passy (Javert), Carlos Ancira (Thernardier), Magda Guzmán (Madame Thernardier), Blanca Sánchez (Fantine), Diana Bracho (Cosette), Edith González (Cosette as a child) and Luis Torner (Marius). Some episodes exist, others might be lost. Came out on February 22, 1974
- 1978, a British telefilm directed by Glenn Jordan and starring Richard Jordan as Valjean, Anthony Perkins as Javert, Angela Pleasence as Fantine, Caroline Langrishe as Cosette, and Christopher Guard as Marius. Original version is 150 minutes long; a cut for theatrical release is 95 minutes. U.S. debut on CBS 27 December.
- 1980/81, Inochimoyu, Japanese TV series for NHK with 23 episodes
- 1981, Los miserables, Argentinian TV movies
- 1985, TV version of the 1982 film, which is 30 minutes longer and divided into four parts
- 1987, Gavroche, East German TV movie based on the 1967 play by Peter Ensikat, directed by Dieter Bellmann.
- 1988, Nihon Jean Valjean monogatari: Ai mujo ("Japanese Jean Valjean's story"), Japanese TV series
- 2000, 6-hour French TV miniseries starring: Gérard Depardieu (Jean Valjean), John Malkovich (Javert), Virginie Ledoyen (Cosette), Enrico Lo Verso (Marius Pontmercy), Charlotte Gainsbourg (Fantine), Asia Argento (Éponine), Christian Clavier and Veronica Ferres (the Thénardiers), Steffen Wink (Enjolras) and Jérôme Hardelay (Gavroche).
- 2000, 3-hour English TV movie version of the 2000 French miniseries.
- 2013, Ngọn Cỏ Gió Đùa, 45-episode 30-hour-long Vietnamese adaptation. Directed by Hồ Ngọc Xum and broadcast on HTV9 channel. Based on Ngọn cỏ gió đùa, Hồ Biểu Chánh's book adaptation of Les Misérables.
- 2014–2015, Los Miserables, a Spanish language telenovela broadcast on Telemundo channel. It is a modern-day semi-adaptation.
- 2018, a BBC miniseries by Andrew Davies, starring Dominic West as Valjean, David Oyelowo as Javert, Lily Collins as Fantine, Ellie Bamber as Cosette, Erin Kellyman as Eponine and Josh O'Connor as Marius.
- 2019, 2-hour Fuji TV Les Misérables Owarinaki Tabiji by Hideya Hamada, starring Dean Fujioka, and Arata Iura.

While there is no actual claim that the television series The Fugitive is a modern adaptation of Les Miserables, there are parallels to and elements of the novel in the series; producer Quinn Martin has gone on record as saying that The Fugitive was "a sort of modern rendition of the outline of Les Miserables."

== Animation ==
- 1966, Gavrosh, Soviet animation short, seemingly a misreporting for the 1986 short below
- 1977, Kozete, Soviet Latvian claymation short, directed by Arnolds Burovs
- 1977, Shōjo Cosette, broadcast on the Japanese television program Manga Sekai Mukashi Banashi, 1 episode, Japanese animation
- 1978, Aa Mujō, cover the first two volumes of the novel, broadcast on Manga Sekai Mukashi Banashi, 13 episodes, Japanese animation
- 1979, Jean Valjean Monogatari, directed by Takashi Kuoka for Toei Animation and written by Masaki Tsuji, Japanese animation. Dubbed in English in 1983 by ZIV International.
- 1986, Gavrosh, Soviet Ukrainian animated short, directed by Iryna Hurvych
- 1988, by Emerald City Productions, directed by Al Guest and Jean Mathieson
- 1992, a 26-episode French animated TV series by Studios Animage, AB Productions, Pixibox and Studio SEK
- 1993, 90-minute movie version of the 1992 series
- 2007, Les Misérables: Shōjo Cosette, a 52-episode Japanese animated TV series by Nippon Animation. This is the longest adaptation at over twenty two and a half hours.

Austrian experimental filmmaker Mara Mattuschka's 1987 two-minute short named Les misérables is not actually an adaptation of the book.

== Radio ==
- 1925, radio play of The Bishop's Candlesticks broadcast on BBC 6BM Bournemouth. Also broadcast on 2EH Edinburgh in 1926, 5WA Cardiff in 1927 and 5PA Plymouth in 1928.
- 1937, Les Misérables, a seven-part series written, produced, directed by and starring Orson Welles, pre-dating his series The Mercury Theatre on the Air.
- 1939, 12 episodes broadcast on the BBC National Programme, directed by Patrick Riddell, produced by John Cheatle, starring Henry Ainley as Jean Valean, Baliol Holloway as Javert, Margaretta Scott as Cosette and Patrick Waddington as Marius. Featuring music specially composed by Robert Chignell.
- 1944, adapted by Rhoda Power for the For Schools program on the BBC Home Service. This adaptation was repeated throughout the 40s and 50s.
- 1947, a radio adaptation of "Jean Valjean and the Bishop", broadcast on Favorite Story on 13 September and starring Ronald Colman.
- 1952, an adaptation of the 1952 movie starring Ronald Colman with Debra Paget and Robert Newton reprising their film roles, directed by Earl Ebi for Lux Radio Theater on 22 January.
- 1976, adapted for radio in 16 parts by Barry Campbell, Constance Cox and Val Gielgud. Starring Robert Hardy as Victor Hugo and Trevor Martin as Jean Valjean. The series aired on BBC Radio 4 between 2 May and 15 August 1976.
- 1982, directed by Hyman Brown for CBS Radio.
- 2001, dramatised in 25 episodes by Sebastian Baczkiewicz and Lin Coghlan, directed by Sally Avens and Jeremy Mortimer for BBC Radio 4.
- 2002, directed by Philip Glassborow and produced by Paul McCusker for Focus on the Family Radio Theatre.
- 2003, CD drama starring Yasuhiko Nemoto, Yoshito Yasuhara, and Kazuo Kumakura. Published by Shinsuisha.
- 2012, 14 episodes, directed by François Christophe for France Culture Radio.
- 2012, Les Miserables: Jean Valjean and Javert CD drama starring Rikiya Koyama, Takehito Koyasu, and Ken Takeuchi. Published by Momogre. Distributed by Aldur and BaraCom.

== Musical ==
In 1980, a musical of the same name opened in Paris at the Palais des Sports. It has gone on to become one of the most successful musicals in history. It was directed by Robert Hossein, the music was composed by Claude-Michel Schönberg, and the libretto was written by Alain Boublil. An English-language version of Schönberg's work opened in London at the Barbican Arts Centre in 1985. It was produced by Cameron Mackintosh and adapted and directed by Trevor Nunn and John Caird. The lyrics were written by Herbert Kretzmer and additional material by James Fenton.

== Concerts ==
- Les Misérables: The Dream Cast in Concert (1995)
- Les Misérables in Concert: The 25th Anniversary (2010)
- Les Misérables: The Staged Concert (2019)

== Plays ==
- 1862, Charity, a two-act drama by C. H. Hazlewood founded on Victor Hugo's story of Les Misérables. The action of the drama depicts the conversion of Jean Valjean (Mr Forrester) by the bishop Myriel (Mr James Johnstone) and the results as developed at Marseilles including an incident with the Savoyard Jarvais (Miss Catherine Lucette). The drama was first performed Sadler's Wells Theatre, London on 7 November. In this version Fantine is revealed to be Valjean's sister, a change to the plot of the novel that would later be used in Henry Neville's adaptation The Yellow Passport.
- 1863, Charles Hugo, the author's son, adapted the novel into a two-act play for the stage in Brussels (the French government had refused to allow the drama to be performed in Paris). The play was subsequently performed in Bordeaux in 1870 and partially at the Théâtre de la Porte Saint-Martin in 1878 (the play ended with Valjean and Cosette finding refuge in the Petit-Picpus convent). The 1899 revival in Paris saw the full play performed with scenes removed, added or modified by Paul Meurice, who was now listed as the co author. This version starred Benoît-Constant Coquelin as Valjean and featured music by André Wormser.
- 1863, Fantine or The Fate of a Grisette in three parts by Albert Cassedy dramatised from the original French edition by Victor Hugo. Music performed by the great composer and director C Koppitz. Performed for three nights only at the Washington Theatre in January.
- 1863, Jean Valjean by Harry Seymour, with George Boniface Sr as Jean Valjean, performed at The Bowery Theatre
- 1867, Out of Evil Cometh Good, a drama in a prologue and four acts, by Clarance Holt; first performed at The Prince of Wales Theatre, Birmingham in October with the author as Valjean, Miss May Holt as Fantine (and Cosette), and Miss Johnstone as Eponine. In late 1869, the play was renamed The Barricade (although initially the original title was kept as a subtitle). The updated cast featured the author as Valjean, Mrs. Digby Willoughby as Fantine (and Cosette), and Miss May Holt as Eponine. The Barricade was first performed at Croydon in October 1867 and made its debut in London on 7 September 1878, at the Duke's Theatre. The play was a critical and commercial success and was performed as late as 1887.
- 1868, The Yellow Passport, a melodrama in prologue and four acts by Henry Neville. The original title of the play, as licensed by The Lord Chamberlain, was The Convict Jean Valjean 9430 and the drama was performed under this title in August at the Amphitheatre, Liverpool. The Yellow Passport made its debut at the Olympic Theatre on 7 November with Neville as Valjean and, despite mixed reviews, enjoyed a respectable run lasting until April 1869. The play enjoyed several revivals, the last of which was at the Britannia in November 1889 with Algernon Syms in the role of Valjean.
- 1868, Alfred Dampier, under the pseudonym of Pierre Adam, wrote an adaptation that was produced in Guernsey and which resulted in a complimentary letter from Victor Hugo. Dampier relocated to Australia in 1873 and performed the play at the Theatre Royal Sydney in June 1874 under the title of The Yellow Passport or Branded For Life. The play was rewritten and re-titled Valjean, Saint or Sinner, for its production at Sydney's Victoria Theatre on 24 February 1877. The play was again rewritten, and re-titled Saint or Sinner for its performance in England at the Surrey Theatre on 26 March 1881. The play was rewritten and retitled A Convict Martyr in 1893 for another performance at the Theatre Royal Sydney. In 1895, the play was performed in various theatres in California in under the title of Les Miserables. The drama bears some plot similarities with William Muskerry's adaptation Atonement or Branded for Life, particularly the conclusion in which Valjean is killed by Thenardier just as he is given a pardon by Javert.
- 1869, The Man of Two Lives, an adaptation of the novel by William Bayle Bernard, first performed at Drury Lane on 29 March with Charles Dillon as Valjean. Dillon had previously performed the role of Valjean two years prior in an adaptation entitled Valjean written by Sheffield playwright Joseph Fox but it was only played in the provinces and was unlicensed. Bernard made some radical changes to the story such as Jean Valjean being sent to the galleys for trying to flee from conscription to military service and not for stealing a loaf of bread. The play was rarely performed after its initial run at Drury Lane.
- 1870, Fantine, written by Bronson Howard and performed in Detroit.
- 1872, Atonement, a romantic drama in a prologue and four acts, founded on Victor Hugo's 'Les Misérables' by William Muskerry, first performed at the Victoria Theatre, London, on 31 August; revived at Sadler's Wells on 14 September; played at Manchester in 1877 in ten tableaux.
- 1875, an adaptation entitled Cosette, with Louis James as Jean Valjean. Performed at the Boston Theatre.
- 1878, Valjean by Algernon Willoughby (founded on Victor Hugo's work, Les Miserables), in which Mr. John Coleman assumed four characters: Jean Valjean, M. Madeline, The Fugitive, and Urban Le Blanc. First performed at The Prince of Wales Theatre, Glasgow, in August. The play was last performed in 1883.
- 1884, Les Miserables, a drama adapted by Wilson E. McDermut and Bertrand H. Atwood, registered for copyright 27 June 1884, under entry no. 12924, by and in the names of the authors.
- 1886, Jean Valjean, Or, The Shadow of the Law, in Five Acts by Harry Clifford Fulton.
- 1892, After Ten Years, by Percy H. Vernon, a one-act play based on the first part of the novel featuring Valjean and the Bishop, first performed at Metropole, Birkenhead on 21 October.
- 1901,The Bishop's Candlesticks, a one-act play by Norman McKinnel based on volume one of the novel.
- 1906, Jean Valjean a play in 4 acts, by Charles Lawson, registered for copyright 18 July 1906, under entry no. D 8342.
- 1906, Jean Valjean, registered for copyright 20 November 1905, under entry no. 5 7643, by and in the name of Gabriel L. Pollock.
- 1906, Broadway actor Wilton Lackaye wrote an adaptation in five acts, The Law and the Man, so he could play Valjean.
- 1914, Jean Valjean, dramatised by Augusta Stevenson.
- 1925, The Hero In Chains, a Yiddish 6-act play covering the episode with the Bishop, written by Zvi Hirsh Dashevsky.
- 1929, The Silver Candlesticks: a one-act play by Gilbert Hudson, adapted from an episode in Victor Hugo's Les Miserables.
- 1938, Jean Valjean and The Christmas Doll, by Agnes Irene. Smith, Dramatic Publishing. A Christmas play in which Jean Valjean finds little Cosette on Christmas Eve.
- 1955, God's Ambassador. A play in three acts by Harold Homes Stuart Jackson. Published by Epworth plays. Freely adapted from an incident recorded in Les Misérables.
- 1987, a stage adaptation by Tim Kelly.
- 1997, a stage adaptation by Jonathan Holloway.
- 2011, A stage adaptation by Spiritual Twist Productions, Les Miserables: A Story of Grace, highlighting the religious aspect of the novel.
- 2013, Les Misérables: The Memoirs of Jean Valjean – A limited run play performed by the South Devon Players during Sept-Nov. Based mainly on the book, with some scenes included that weren't well known.
- A stage adaptation is performed outdoors every summer at the Citadelle in Montreuil-sur-Mer, the setting of the first part of the novel.
- 2018, Grantaire, a Spanish musical by Luciano Muriel focusing on the character of Grantaire.
- In 2018, Iranian director Hossein Parsaei staged a big-budget musical adaptation of Victor Hugo's masterpiece in the Royal Hall of Espinas Palace Hotel in the Iranian capital Tehran. Over 300 cinema superstars, actors, singers and musicians appeared in the play. The adaptation was the most expensive show in the history of Iran's theatre until that day, and was the first one staged in the Espinas Palace Hotel, whose auditorium has a capacity of 2,500 people.
- The musical Gavroche is a retelling of the story from the point of view of the young characters, mainly Gavroche and his siblings. The book, music, and lyrics for Gavroche are by Bonnie Gleicher, based on John Hoover's original concept and book.

== Games ==
- An adventure game has been released by Chris Tolworthy, intended as a direct adaptation of the book.
- There is a free downloadable amateur 2D fighting game based on the musical. The game is called ArmJoe, which is created by Takase. The name is a pun on the novel's Japanese title Aa Mujō (ああ無情). The game incorporates the major characters as they appear in the musical, namely Jean Valjean, Enjolras, Marius, Cosette, Éponine, Thénardier, and Javert – as well as a policeman, a robotic clone of Valjean called RoboJean, an embodiment of Judgement, and a rabbit named Ponpon.
- In 2013, Anuman Interactive launched Les Miserables: Cosette's Fate, a hidden object game based on the novel. Players embody Cosette and try to escape from the innkeepers.
- Les Miserables: Jean Valjean, a hidden object game based on the novel.
- Les Misérables: Eve of Rebellion, a card game based on the novel.
- In Persona 5 Strikers, Valjean appears as the Persona of the playable character Zenkichi Hasegawa, given the new Arcana of the Apostle Arcana.

== Dance ==
In 2003, the Tani Momoko Ballet created the ballet Les Misérables. The libretto spans the novel, beginning with Jean Valjean's theft of bread, and ending with his death. Choreographer Norihiko Mochizuki used classical and modern music from the nineteenth and twentieth centuries, including "Vltava" from Smetana's Má Vlast and the Catalan lullaby "El Cant dels Ocells". The ballet was restaged in 2010, when it was awarded the top prize in the dance division of the 65th ACA National Arts Festival held by the Government of Japan's Agency for Cultural Affairs, and again in August 2022 at Mielparque Tokyo.
