= Journey from Peppermint Street =

1968 children's book

- Author: Meindert De Jong
- Illustrator: Emily Arnold McCully
- Language: English
- Genre: Children's literature
- Publisher: Harper
- Publication date: 1968
- Publication place: United States
- Media type: Hardback
- Pages: 242

Journey from Peppermint Street is a 1968 children's novel by Dutch American author Meindert De Jong and illustrated by Emily Arnold McCully. Set in Wierum, the Netherlands, during the early 1900s, it tracks the nighttime journey of the young boy Siebren as he travels with his grandfather from his coastal village to visit his ill aunt. The book was well-received, winning the inaugural National Book Award for Young People's Literature in 1969. It was the last of De Jong's books to be set in the Netherlands.
