= Shadrach (novel) =

1953 novel by Meindert DeJong

- Author: Meindert De Jong
- Illustrator: Maurice Sendak
- Cover artist: Maurice Sendak
- Language: English
- Genre: Children's literature /
- Publisher: Harper
- Publication date: 1953
- Publication place: United States
- Pages: 182
- ISBN: 0-06-440115-4

Shadrach is a 1954 children's novel by Dutch American author Meindert De Jong and illustrated by Maurice Sendak, the first of seven books that Sendak illustrated for De Jong. The book was one of two Meindert books that earned a Newbery Honor in 1954; the other was Hurry Home, Candy.

== Summary ==
6-year-old Dutch boy Davie impatiently waits to receive a gift rabbit from his grandfather. Foolishly, Davie decides to collect clover to feed the rabbit from the steep banks of the canals in his town, almost hurting himself. Maartins, a traveling merchant, finally delivers the black rabbit, and Davie is smitten. The rabbit, however, slowly begins to lose weight, enough that it can escape its hutch, alarming Davie. The rabbit eventually slips out and escapes. Searching the family barn, he finds the rabbit inside eating oats. Reunited, David reaffirms his commitment to caring for the rabbit.
