= Jean Val Jean =

1935 novel by Solomon Cleaver

- Author: Solomon Cleaver
- Language: English
- Publication date: 1935

Jean Val Jean is a 1935 novel by Solomon Cleaver. It is a much abbreviated retelling in English of Victor Hugo's 1862 novel Les Misérables.

According to the publisher's preface, around the turn of the 20th century, Cleaver, a young minister from Winnipeg, read through Les Misérables and often retold it in his own words. His oral adaptation proved so popular that he was persuaded to write it down and publish it. The resulting novel, titled Jean Val Jean, is less than one-tenth the length of and uses much simpler language than the original. It remains popular, especially among young readers who do not have the patience or reading skills for Hugo's five-volume original.

Rudy Wiebe, a Canadian author and professor of English, described it as "a sanitized text approved for Canadian children by both the Catholic and public school boards", in which Hugo's lengthy history of the Paris sewers is "eviscerated into one subordinate clause", the entire passage through the sewers condensed "from 39 pages to 627 words" and the last two chapters replaced with a single hymn verse. He recalled reading it at the age of 12 and later finding it shelved in the university library's Canadian Literature section.

== Publication history ==
- Toronto: Clarke, Irwin and Company Limited, 1935, 1951, 1957, 1959, 1962.
- Saskatoon: Western Extension College Educational Publishers, 1989. ISBN 0-920284-17-5

== See also ==
- Adaptations of Les Misérables
