= Ellen Oh =

American author

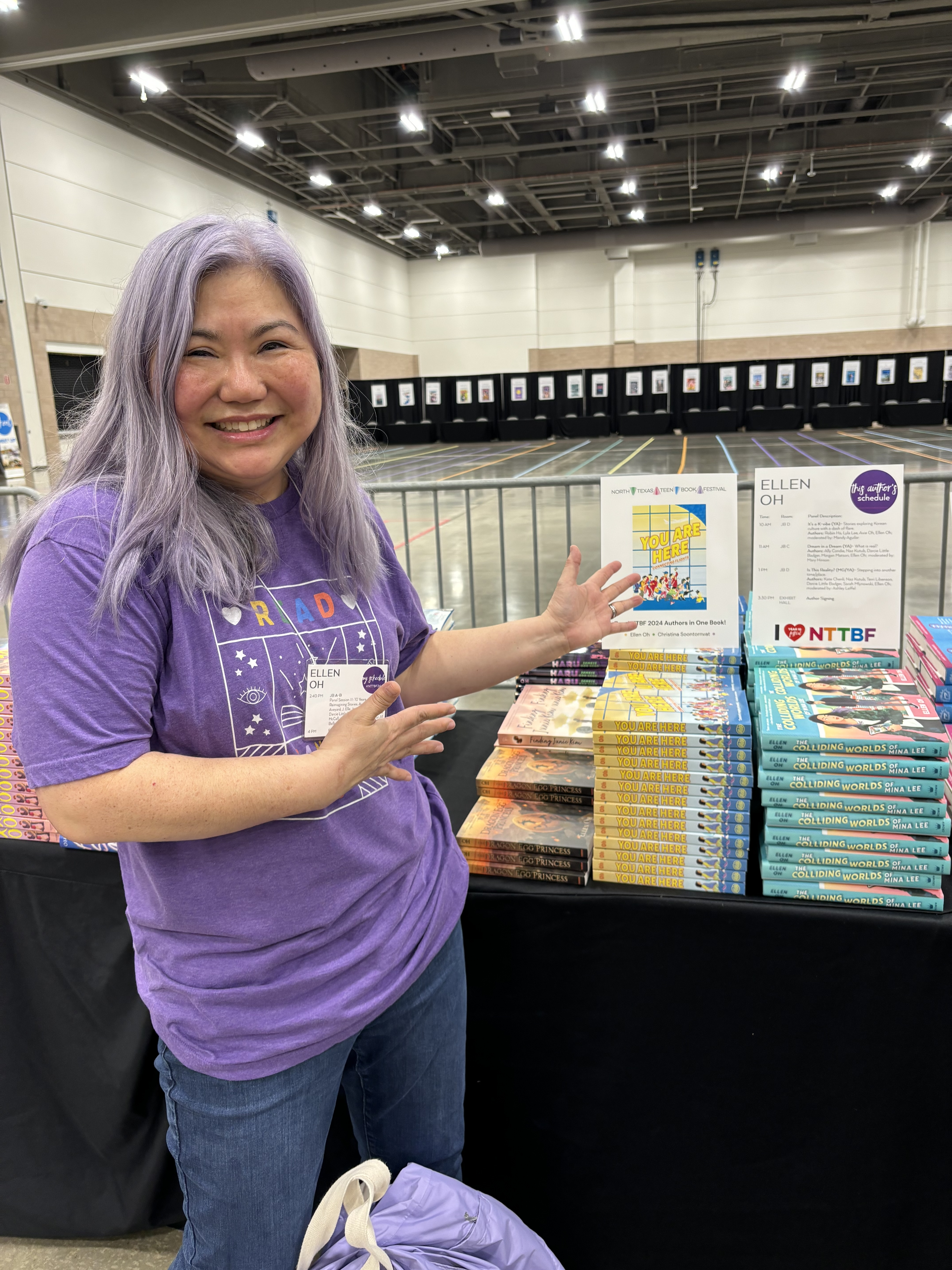
- Occupation: Novelist
- Writing career
- Language: English
- Years active: 2013–present
- Genre: Young adult fiction
- Website: ellenoh.com

Ellen Oh (née Ha) is a Korean-American author, and founding member and CEO of the non-profit We Need Diverse Books. She is the author of young adult and middle grade novels including the Prophecy trilogy, also known as the Dragon King Chronicles, a series of fantasy, young adult novels based on Korean folklore.

== Life and career ==
Oh grew up in Brooklyn, New York. She attended New York University and Georgetown University, graduating with a legal degree. She began to write seriously after she had children, prompted by her struggle to find books that included representation for her kids.

Prophecy, the first book in Oh's young adult fantasy series, was published in January 2013. The series, known both as the Prophecy trilogy and the Dragon King Chronicles, draws from Korean folklore.

In 2014, BookCon announced an all-white line-up for the event and hosted a children's book author panel consisting of all-white, all-male participants. In response, Ellen Oh and others in the industry created a Twitter campaign under the hashtag #WeNeedDiverseBooks. The campaign, launched on May 1, 2014, gained 106 million Twitter impressions in the first 24 hours. The organization We Need Diverse Books (WNDB) was incorporated in the summer of 2014. For her work, Oh was named one of Publishers Weekly's Notable People in 2014. As of 2020, she is currently the president of WNDB.

In 2016, Oh was a judge for the National Book Awards in the young people's literature category.

Oh's book, Spirit Hunters, was started after her daughter was hospitalized due to depression. The first scene she wrote for the book was influenced by the hospital room and, according to Oh, based on "that feeling of depression and horror and sadness and fear that I was feeling and that I know my kid was feeling." The book follows a young child, Harper, and her family as they move into a seemingly haunted house. The story was influenced by Korean Shamanism, and was published in 2017.

In 2020, Oh, Christina Soontornvat and Melanie Conklin created the Everywhere Book Fest, due to COVID-19 cancelling in-person book festivals. It was held online May 1 and 2, 2020, focusing on children's literature with 43,000 viewers attending.

== Bibliography ==
- The Dragon Egg Princess (2020)
- Finding Junie Kim (2021)
- Haru Zombie Dog Hero (2023)
- You Are Here: Connecting Flights (2023)
- Colliding Worlds of Mina Lee (2024)
- The House Next Door (2025)

=== Dragon King Chronicles series ===
- Prophecy (2013)
- Warrior (2013)
- King (2015)

=== Spirit Hunters series ===
- Spirit Hunters (2017)
- Spirit Hunters: The Island of Monsters (2018)
- Spirit Hunters: Something Wicked (2022)

=== Short stories ===
- "The Last Day" in Diverse Energies (2012), edited by Tobias S. Buckell and Joe Monti
- "Second Chances" in Behind the Song (2017), edited by K. M. Walton
- "Everly’s Otherworldly Dilemma" in The Hero Next Door (2019), edited by Olugbemisola Rhuday-Perkovich
- "Kodama's Ramen Shop" in Fresh Ink (2018) paperback version, edited by Lamar Giles
- "Carp, Calculus and the Leap of Faith" in A Thousand Beginnings and Endings (2018) paperback version, edited by Ellen Oh and Elsie Chapman

=== Editor ===
- Flying Lessons & Other Stories (2017)
- A Thousand Beginnings and Endings (2018)
- On the Block:Stories of Home (2024)
