= Jessica Khoury =

American writer (born 1990)

Jessica Khoury (born 7 February 1990) is an American writer of fantasy novels and children's literature. She was born in Toccoa, Georgia on 7 February 1990. She is of Syrian-Scottish descent.

Khoury first attended public school and was then homeschooled from fourth grade through high school. She earned her bachelor's degree in English from Toccoa Falls College in 2010. Her first fantasy novel, Origin, was published in 2012.

Khoury's stories have been translated into over a dozen languages, including Czech, Dutch, French, German, Polish, Portuguese, Spanish, and Turkish. Khoury has been a finalist for awards like the South Carolina Junior Book Award, the Ignyte Award, the Maine Student Book Award, the Oklahoma Sequoyah Masterlist, and the Amelia Bloomer Project. She lives with her family in Greenville, South Carolina.

== Awards ==
Year	Award	Work	Result	Ref.
2017	Rise: A Feminist Book Project	The Forbidden Wish	Won	
2020	Ignyte Award for Outstanding Middle Grade	The Mystwick School of Musicraft	Finalist	
2022	Maine Student Book Award	The Mystwick School of Musicraft	Nominated	

== Published works ==
=== Children's literature ===
==== The Mystwick School of Musicraft series ====
- The Mystwick School of Musicraft (2022)
- The Midnight Orchestra (2023)
- The Dark Refrain (2025)

==== SkyBorn series ====
- Sparrow Rising (2021)
- Call of the Crow (2022)
- Phoenix Flight (2022)

==== Other books ====
- Rise of the Dragons - The Lost Lands (2020)
- The Ruby Code (2023)
- Monster and Apprentice (2026)

=== Young Adult literature ===
==== Corpus series ====
- Origin (2012)
- Vitro (2014)
- Kalahari (2015)

==== Other books ====
- The Forbidden Wish (2016)
- Last of her Name (2019)

=== Adult literature ===
- The Moorwitch (2025)
