= Red, White, and Whole =

2021 children's novel about a young Indian girl living in the US in the 1980s

- Author: Rajani LaRocca
- Audio read by: Priya Ayyar
- Language: English
- Genre: Children's literature
- Publisher: Quill Tree Books
- Publication date: 2021
- Publication place: United States
- Pages: 256
- ISBN: 006304742X

Red, White, and Whole is a 2021 middle grade novel written in free verse by Indian-American author Rajani LaRocca. The audiobook is narrated by Priya Ayyar.

In the novel, Reha, a teenager living in the United States in 1983, finds herself caught between the expectations of her Indian parents and her love for American culture.

Red, White, and Whole was well received by critics, with many naming it one of the best children's books of 2021, including Bank Street College of Education, BookPage, the New York Public Library, School Library Journal, and The Washington Post. The Association for Library Service to Children included it on their 2022 list of Notable Children's Books.

Red, White, and Whole is a Junior Library Guild book.

Awards for Red, White, and Whole
Year	Award	Result	Ref.
2021	Cybils Award for Poetry	Finalist	
2021	Goodreads Choice Awards for Readers' Favorite Middle Grade & Children's	Nominee	
2021	New England Book Award for Middle Grade	Winner	
2021	Newbery Medal	Honor	
2022	Crystal Kite Award	Winner	
2022	Golden Kite Award for Middle Grade Fiction	Winner	
2022	Walter Dean Myers Award for Young Readers	Winner	
