= A Wish in the Dark =

2020 children's book by Christina Soontornvat

- Author: Christina Soontornvat
- Cover artist: Ji-Hyuk Kim
- Language: English
- Publisher: Candlewick Press
- Publication date: March 24, 2020
- Publication place: United States
- Pages: 384
- Awards: Newbery Honor; Jane Addams Children's Book Award
- ISBN: 978-1-5362-0494-0
- OCLC: 1127828873
- Website: soontornvat.com/books/a-wish-in-the-dark

A Wish in the Dark is a 2020 children's fantasy novel by American author Christina Soontornvat. It is a retelling of the 1862 novel Les Misérables by Victor Hugo, and contains elements inspired by Thai culture. The book received positive reviews from critics and won a Newbery Honor and a Jane Addams Children's Book Award.

== Plot ==
After the city of Chattana was ravaged by the Great Fire, plunging it into darkness, it falls under the rule of the Governor, who is able to create magical orbs that are the city's only sources of light and power. Pong, a nine-year-old boy who was born in Namwon Prison and who has spent his entire life there, escapes by hiding in a garbage basket. He longs to live freely in Chattana, though his prison tattoo identifies him as a fugitive. When Pong is caught stealing food from a monastery on the outskirts of Chattana, the senior monk Father Cham vouches for him and takes him in, and helps him conceal his tattoo.

Four years later, the monastery is visited by the family of the former warden of Namwon Prison, who was dismissed after Pong's escape. Pong flees after he is recognized by Nok Sivapan, the warden's daughter, who vows to bring him to justice to restore honor to her family. Pursued by Nok, Pong returns to Chattana, where he reunites with his friend from prison, Somkit, and becomes involved in a movement to protest the social inequality in the city. Somkit knows how to make his own orb lights, which he will show the people at protest to show that they don't need the Governor's light. Nok tries to warn the Governor about the protest, but is rebuffed; she begins to question the Governor's motives and eventually comes to realize the oppression and tyranny in the city. She unites with Pong, Somkit, and the other protestors in the march, which successfully results in an end to the Governor's rule. Though the future seems uncertain, the people of Chattana can live more freely.

== Background and publication ==
A Wish in the Dark is a retelling of the 1862 novel Les Misérables by French writer Victor Hugo. The book was published by Candlewick Press on March 24, 2020, and the audiobook version was narrated by Greta Jung.

== Reception ==
A Wish in the Dark received generally positive reviews from critics, particularly for its themes of inequality and civil disobedience, as well as its depiction of Thai culture. Julie Overpeck of School Library Journal praised the book's exploration of "morality, oppression, and being defined by one’s circumstances", and wrote that "the action is enhanced by the fantastical Thailand-like setting." Fiona Hartley-Kroeger, writing for The Bulletin of the Center for Children's Books, similarly praised the "rich, atmospheric Thai-inspired settings", but noted that "Somkit’s path to identity and community takes a back seat." Kirkus Reviews called the story a "complex, hopeful, fresh retelling" of Les Misérables, while Publishers Weekly praised the plot's "emotional pull" and the characters' relationships. In a positive review of the audiobook, AudioFile wrote: "Distinct voices for each character give even more resonance to the emotional pull of their relationships."

The book was awarded a 2021 Newbery Honor alongside another of Soontornvat's books, All Thirteen: The Incredible Cave Rescue of the Thai Boys' Soccer Team. It also won the 2021 Jane Addams Children's Book Award in the Books for Older Children category. Along with this, many middle-school students read this book, such as Savar Ganjawala (FJU).

== See also ==
- Adaptations of Les Misérables
