= Along Came a Dog =

1958 novel by Meindert DeJong

- First edition
- Author: Meindert DeJong
- Illustrator: Maurice Sendak
- Language: English
- Genre: Children's literature
- Publisher: Harper & Brothers
- Publication date: January 1, 1958
- Publication place: United States
- Media type: Print
- Pages: 192 pages

Along Came a Dog is a children's novel by Meindert DeJong, and Maurice Sendak. It was a Newbery Medal honor book in 1959.

It tells a story about a friendship of a little red hen and a homeless dog who appoints himself as her protector. A big black dog came to the farm in search of a home. The dog was humble and lonesome. The hen was cocky and secure. A strange and wonderful friendship grew between them.

== Plot ==
Along Came a Dog is the story of a friendship between a little red hen and a homeless dog. The little red hen lost her toes during the winter when the floor in the hen house froze up. When spring came, her toes fell off in the mud when she walked out the hen house. The homeless dog comes to the farm looking for a home. However, Joe had a bad experience with dogs and took him away from the farm. Joe's previous red flock of chicken were eaten by a pack of dogs. Joe took the dog away twice, but the dog always found his way back to the farm.

The White hens noticed that the little red hen was toeless and started attacking her. The rooster also fought the little red hen instead of protecting her.

Because the little red hen lost her toes, she can not walk up the ramp to the hen house. She sleeps with the dog in the bushes. The dog protects the little red hen from other animals from the swamp. The dog has protected her from weasels, skunks, dogs, and the white hens.

Joe had forgotten to feed the hens, so the hens followed the dog out to the field and swamp to look for food. The little red hen found a perfect spot under a willow tree to build a nest. She didn't want to go back to the barn because she laid an egg.

Back in the barn, Joe found the dog and took him to town so that he wouldn't find his way back to the barn. For the next two weeks, the dog had been lost, and nowhere to be seen in the barn. The dog caught a faint scent of the swamp where the little red hen laid her eggs. He went over to the swamp and found that the little red hen has five eggs in the nest, and they were hatching. When all the eggs were hatched, the dog led the little red hen and her five chicks back to the barn. On the way back to the barn, they were attacked by a hawk. The hawk grabbed the little red hen and tried to fly up. The dog launched himself at the hawk, which flew away. Then the dog, the little red hen, and the five chicks went back to the barn. Joe saw what happened and welcomed them back home.

The dog has earned Joe's trust that it will help protect his hens from danger, so he decided to keep the dog.

== Characters ==
- Joe "The Man" – Has a crazy habit of talking to animals.
- Little Red Hen – The only survivor of the red flock that a pack of dogs mauled.
- The Dog – Homeless dog that wants to find a home. Becomes friends with the Little Red Hen and protects her.
- The boss – Joe's boss that works in the big farm.
- White Hens – Bullies and takes advantage of the little red hen for not having toes.
- The Rooster – Favors the white hens, and takes advantage of the little red hen.
