= Meindert De Jong =

American writer (1906–1991)

- Born: March 4, 1906; Wierum, Friesland, Netherlands
- Died: July 16, 1991 (aged 85); Allegan, Michigan, US
- Occupation: Writer
- Writing career
- Period: 1938–1986
- Genre: Children's literature

Meindert De Jong (Dutch pronunciation: [/jɔŋ/]), also spelled de Jong, DeJong, or Dejong (March 4, 1906 – July 16, 1991), was a Dutch-born American Newbery Medal–winning writer of children's books. During the height of his popularity, he frequently collaborated with Maurice Sendak, who illustrated seven of De Jong's books.

== Life ==
De Jong was born in Wierum, Friesland, Netherlands, and his family emigrated to the United States in 1914 to prevent De Jong's oldest brother from being drafted into World War I. The family settled in Grand Rapids, Michigan when he was 8 years old. As De Jong's parents were Calvinists, he attended a Calvinist elementary school, graduated from Meintian High School in 1924, and then enrolled at Calvin College; he attended the University of Chicago for a time but returned to graduate from Calvin in 1928.

After graduating, De Jong held numerous jobs, including mason, gravedigger, and professor at Grundy College in Iowa; dissatisfied with teaching, in 1930, he moved back to Michigan and became a farmer. De Jong married Hattie Overeinter on July 6, 1933. With the United States in the depths of the Great Depression, De Jong began writing short stories to submit to magazines to supplement his income, which lasted until the magazines folded. De Jong then resorted to selling eggs from his farm; at one of his stops, the local library, he would tell the librarian stories about his farm animals; the librian suggested De Jong write children's books, and his first book, The Big Goose and the Little White Duck, was accepted by Harper and published in 1938. Following the book's publication, he moved back to Michigan and worked on the Federal Writers' Project in Grand Rapids.

De Jong wrote several more books before joining the US Army Air Corps during World War II, where he worked for two years as a historian for the 68th Composite Wing at Peishiyi Airfield, China, as part of the 14th Air Force, eventually reaching the rank of sergeant. During his time in China, he wrote his 1957 Newbery Honor book The House of Sixty Fathers; it went unpublished at the time due to its harsh subject matter and for operational security. The Cat That Walked a Mile in published 1943. De Jong returned to the U.S. after the war but avoided writing, instead doing manual labor jobs.

De Jong experienced his greatest critical acclaim in the 1950s, with five of his books being recognized by the Newbery Award Selection Committee: four were selected for Newbery Honors, and The Wheel on the School won the Newbery Medal in 1955. Maurice Sendak illustrated all of De Jong's books during this period of critical recognition; De Jong would go on to dedicate The Singing Hill to Sendak, saying he "illuminates my things because we are a pair."

Following his success in the 1950s, in 1962, he was awarded the Hans Christian Andersen Award, becoming the first American to win the award. After divorcing his first wife, he married his second wife, Beatrice DeClaire McElwee, in 1962 and moved to San Miguel de Allende, Mexico. In 1968, the couple moved to Chapel Hill, North Carolina, and then to Allegan, Michigan, in 1973. Beatrice died in 1978, and De Jong fell into a depression and quit writing. He married his third wife, Gwendolyn Jonkman Zandstra, in 1979 and officially retired from writing in 1986. De Jong died of emphysema in Allegan on July 16, 1991.

== Awards ==
De Jong books were recognized 5 times by the Newbery Award Selection Committee, the most of any author won also won the Medal, with The Wheel on the School winning the Newbery Medal in 1955, and Shadrach, Hurry Home, Candy, The House of Sixty Fathers, and Along Came a Dog being Newbery Honor books in 1954, 1957, and 1959. He and Christina Soontornvat are the only authors to have two books receive Newbery Honors in the same year, in De Jong's case in 1954 for Hurry Home, Candy and Shadrach.

The House of Sixty Fathers also won the Josette Frank Award in 1956, The Wheel on the School won the Germany Youth Literature Award in 1957 and the Lewis Carroll Shelf Award in 1963, and Journey from Peppermint Street won the inaugural National Book Award for Young People's Literature in 1969.

In 1962, De Jong won the Hans Christian Andersen Award for his lasting contribution to literature for young people. He was the first American recipient of the honor, the highest international recognition for a creator of children's books.

== Books ==
- The Big Goose and the Little White Duck (1938)
- Dirk's Dog Bello (1939)
- Wheels Over the Bridge (1941)
- The Cat That Walked a Week (1943)
- The Little Stray Dog (1943)
- Bells of the Harbor (1941)
- Billy and the Unhappy Bull (1946)
- Bible Days (1949)
- Good Luck Duck (1950)
- The Tower by the Sea (1950)
- Smoke above the Lane (1951)
- Shadrach (1953), illustrated by Maurice Sendak
- Hurry Home, Candy (1953), illustrated by Maurice Sendak
- The Wheel on the School (1954), illustrated by Maurice Sendak
- The Little Cow and the Turtle (1955), illustrated by Maurice Sendak
- The House of Sixty Fathers (1956), illustrated by Maurice Sendak
- Along Came a Dog (1958), illustrated by Maurice Sendak
- The Mighty Ones; Great Men and Women of Early Bible Days (1959)
- The Last Little Cat (1961)
- The Singing Hill (1962), illustrated by Maurice Sendak
- Nobody Plays with a Cabbage (1963)
- Far Out the Long Canal (1964)
- Puppy Summer (1966)
- Journey from Peppermint Street (1968)
- A Horse Came Running (1970)
- The Easter Cat (1971)
- The Almost All-White Rabbity Cat (1972)
