= Clarance Holt =

English actor-manager

- Born: Joseph Frederick Holt; 9 January 1826; Marylebone, London, England
- Died: 27 September 1903 (aged 77); Bloomsbury, England
- Occupation: actor-manager
- Years active: 1846–1893
- Spouse: Marian Vaughan
- Children: Ellen Elizabeth Vaughan; Elizabeth May Holt; Joseph Thomas Holt

Clarance Holt (9 January 1826 – 27 September 1903), born Joseph Frederick Holt, was an English actor-manager who had a successful career on the stage in England, Australia and New Zealand. His company included his wife and, frequently, his three children, all of whom went on to have successful careers on the stage. His first name is frequently misspelled "Clarence".

== Early life and career ==
He was born on 9 January 1826 in Marylebone, London the youngest son of Thomas Holt and Elizabeth Giddens. His father was a successful military tailor with an establishment (Thomas Holt & Son) in Piccadilly. He was variously described in his younger days as actor, acrobat and comedian and eventually adopted the stage name of Clarance. Holt made his stage debut in 1842 as Timothy in William Thomas Moncrieff's farce All at Coventry at the Victoria Theatre, London. He married Marian Vaughan (stage name sometimes Marian Brown) 6th February 1849 at Ipswich and they were acting together by 1850 when he was appointed manager of the Theatre Royal, Norwich under the name of Joseph Clarance.

== Career in Australia and New Zealand ==
Holt went to Melbourne with his wife in September 1854 at the suggestion of George Coppin. From Geelong he went to Hobart Town and Launceston, Tasmania and in September 1855 opened at the Prince of Wales Theatre in Sydney. Before leaving Australia in April 1857 he had played in most of the goldfields centres of Victoria and performed on 330 nights. In 1858 he returned to Melbourne with his family on board the Josephine. A successful tragedian, Holt played Othello to Gustavus Brooke's Iago. In 1861 he took over management of the Theatre Royal, Ballarat on Sturt Street, the town's only theatre after fire destroyed the Montezuma and the Charlie Napier, both on the Main Road. In 1862 as joint lessee of the Theatre Royal, Melbourne, he engaged Brooke, Anna Bishop, Joseph Jefferson and others. When the lease ran out he went to Dunedin and "became the pioneer of the English drama in New Zealand" by establishing the theatre there.

== Later career in England ==
In September 1864 he returned to England and went into partnership with Charles Wilmot and they managed a number of theatres including the City of London Theatre, The Duke's Theatre, Holborn, The Islington Theatre and the Lyceum Theatre, Sunderland. In addition to managing these theatres he continued to perform and tour the provinces. He also created a successful one man touring show – A Night with Shakespeare and Dickens and in 1870 wrote, produced and starred in an adaptation of Les Misérables – The Barricade. He retired from the stage in about 1893.

== Personal life ==
He was married three times: to Marian Vaughan in 1849, Alice Hayes in 1883 and Hannah Harris in 1893. Three of his four children; Ellen Elizabeth "Nellie" Vaughan (as per details in her marriage certificate in New Zealand to Thomas Edward Harris), (Elizabeth) May Holt and (Joseph Thomas) Bland Holt all became actors. His 4th child Frances Alice died very young in 1859 whilst in Australia
