= The Last Mapmaker =

2021 children's book by Christina Soontornvat

- Author: Christina Soontornvat
- Language: English
- Genre: Children's literature; Children's fantasy
- Publisher: Candlewick Press
- Publication date: April 12, 2022
- Publication place: United States
- Pages: 368
- Award: Newbery Honor (2023)
- ISBN: 978-1-5362-0495-7

The Last Mapmaker is a 2021 children's fantasy novel written by American author and educator Christina Soontornvat.

The novel is set in the Kingdom of Mangkon, where 12-year-old Sai works as an assistant for Paiyoon Wongyai, the Master Mapmaker. After Paiyoon is tasked with mapping an unknown region to the south of the kingdom, Sai accompanies him and begins an adventure that will change her life.

The Last Mapmaker includes themes related to "anti-imperialism and environmental preservation", as well as "classism, animal cruelty, exploitation of natural resources, and colonialism".

The novel was well-received by critics, including starred reviews from Kirkus Reviews, Publishers Weekly, and School Library Journal. The Chicago Public Library, Kirkus Reviews, and The New York Times named it one of the best children's books of 2022. The following year, it won the Newbery Honor, Soontornvat's third. It was also an honor book for the Walter Dean Myers Award for Young Readers. The Young Adult Library Services Association included it on their 2023 list of Best Fiction for Young Adults, and the Association for Library Service to Children named it one of the year's Notable Children's Books.
