= Wierum =

- Village
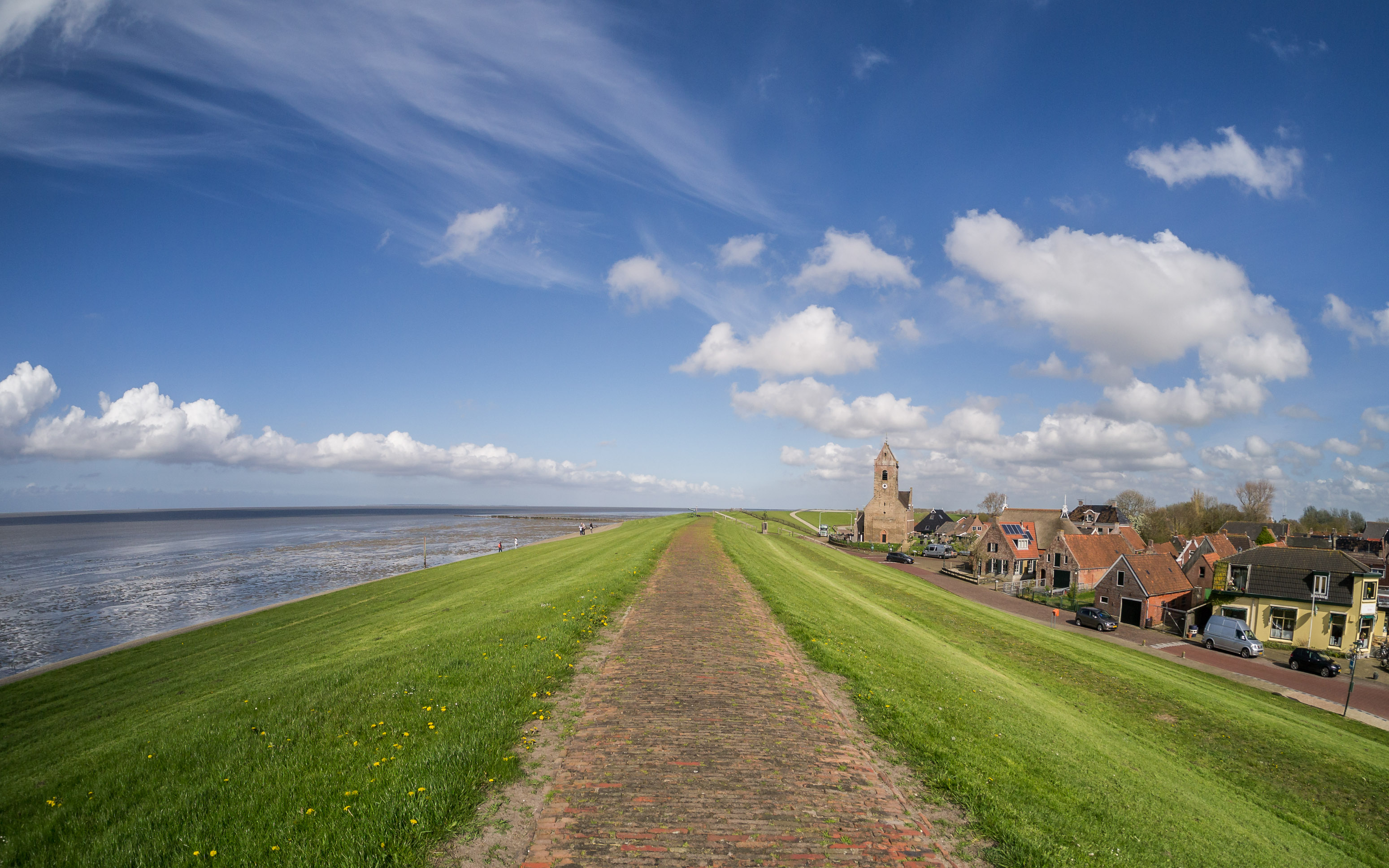
- St Mary's church alongside the sea shore

- Flag Coat of arms

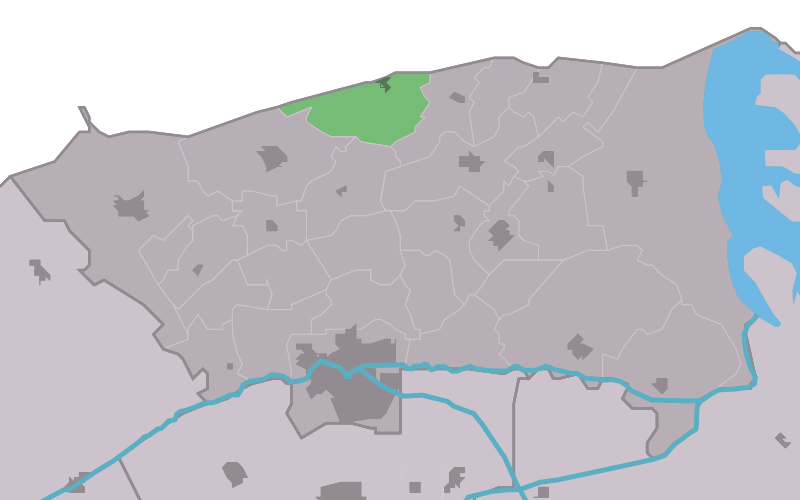
- Location in the former Dongeradeel municipality

- Location in the Netherlands Wierum (Netherlands)
- Country: Netherlands
- Province: Friesland
- Municipality: Noardeast-Fryslân

Area
  - Total: 4.39 km^{2} (1.69 sq mi)
- Elevation: 0.5 m (1.6 ft)

Population (2021)
  - Total: 315
  - Density: 71.8/km^{2} (186/sq mi)
- Time zone: UTC+1 (CET)
  - Summer (DST): UTC+2 (CEST)
- Postal code: 9141
- Dialing code: 0519

Wierum is a village in Noardeast-Fryslân in the province of Friesland, the Netherlands with a population of around 339 in January 2017. Before 2019, the village was part of the Dongeradeel municipality.

== History ==
The village was first mentioned in 1335 as Weyrum, and probably means terp (artificial living mound). Wierum is a terp village which developed in the early middle ages. The northern part of the terp was washed away by the Wadden Sea which gives the church an eccentric appearance. It used to be a fishing village. The Dutch Reformed church was built around 1200. The tower was restored in 1984.

In 1840, Wierum was home to 698 people. On 1 December 1893, 17 of the 22 ships of Wierum were lost at sea during a storm. In 1968, A monument has been placed on the sea dike to commemorate the 32 dead. In the 20th century, fishery disappeared from the village.

There is a shipwreck about 100 metres off the coast. At low tide, one can walk to the wreck.

Wierum features in The Wheel On The School by Meindert de Jong, where it has been renamed Shora. Wierum was de Jong's birthplace. De Jong made his hometown Wierum a notably popular area because of his popular novel "The Wheel on the School."

== Gallery ==
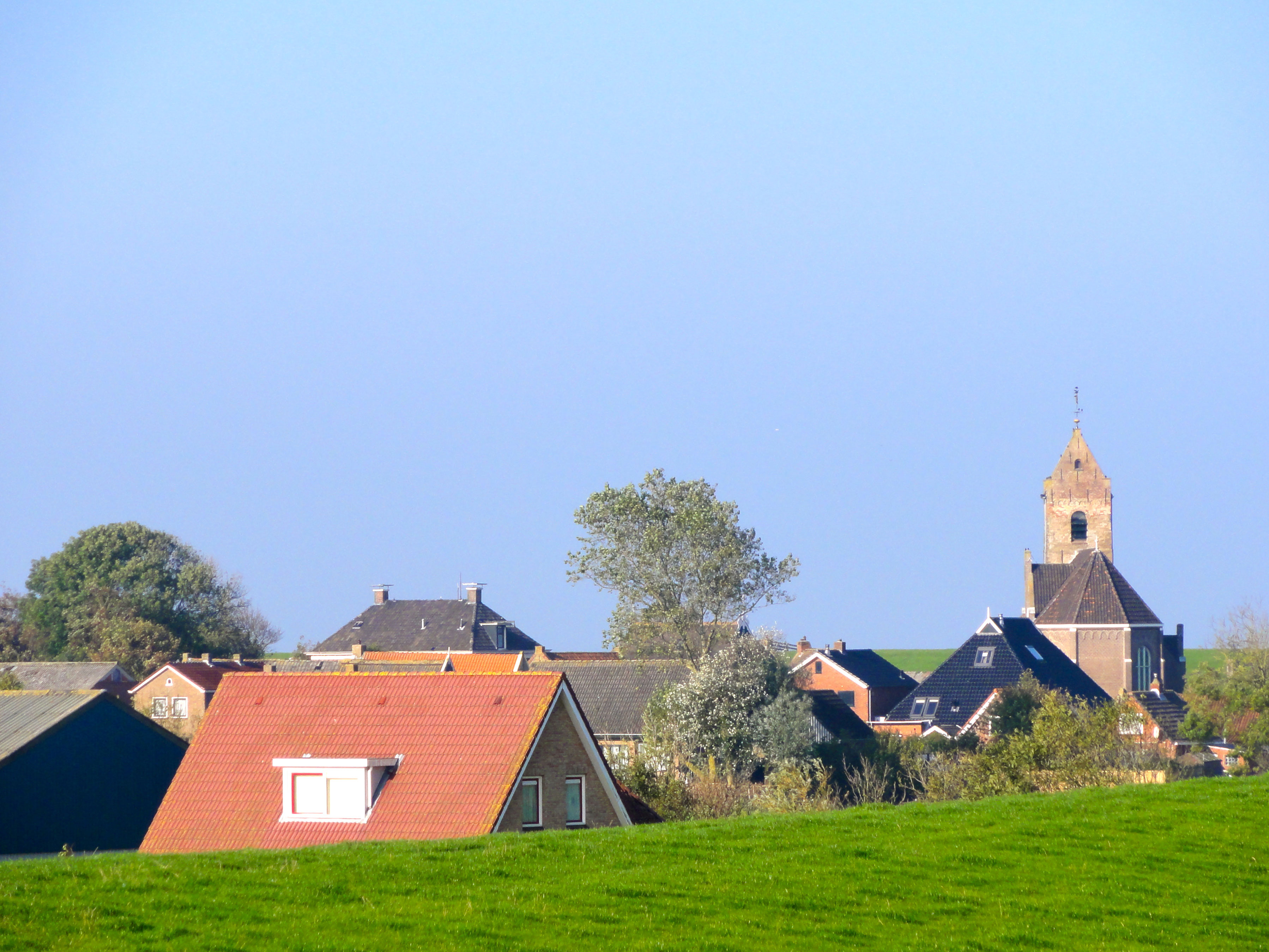
Wierum

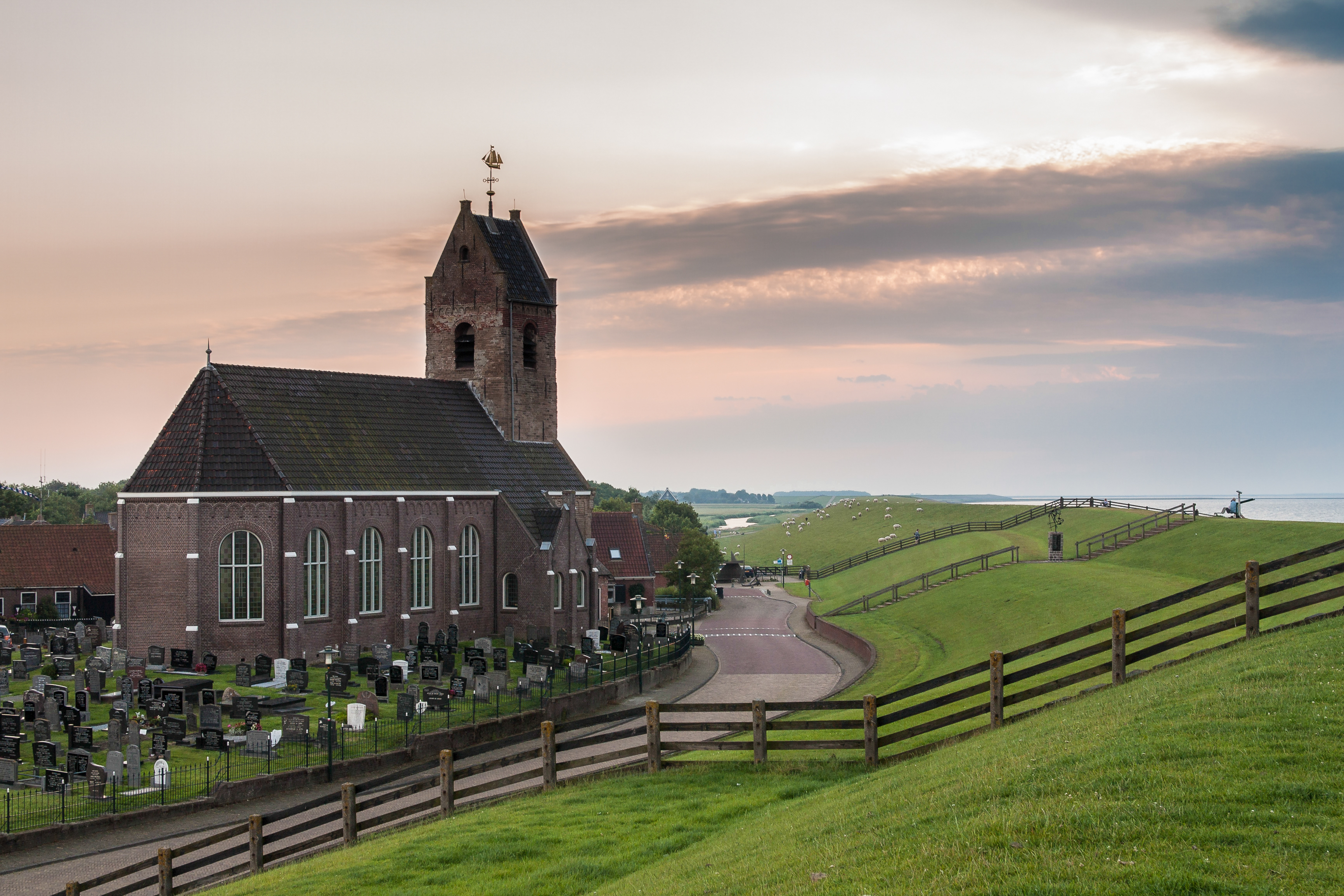
Maria Church in Wierum

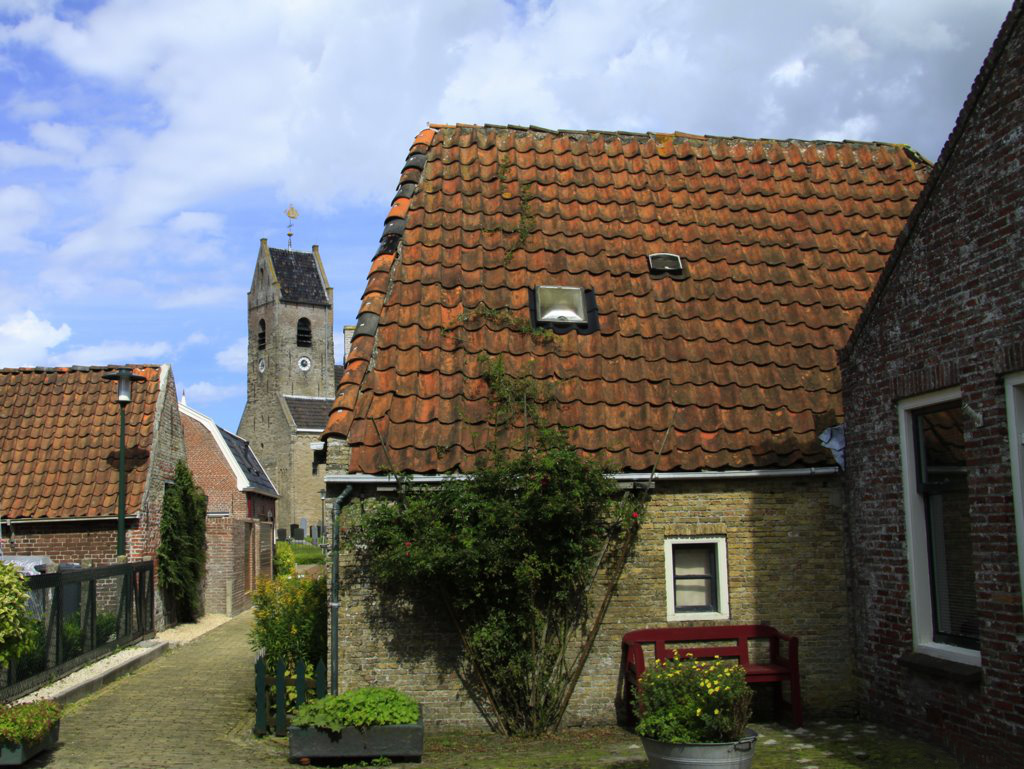
Wierum

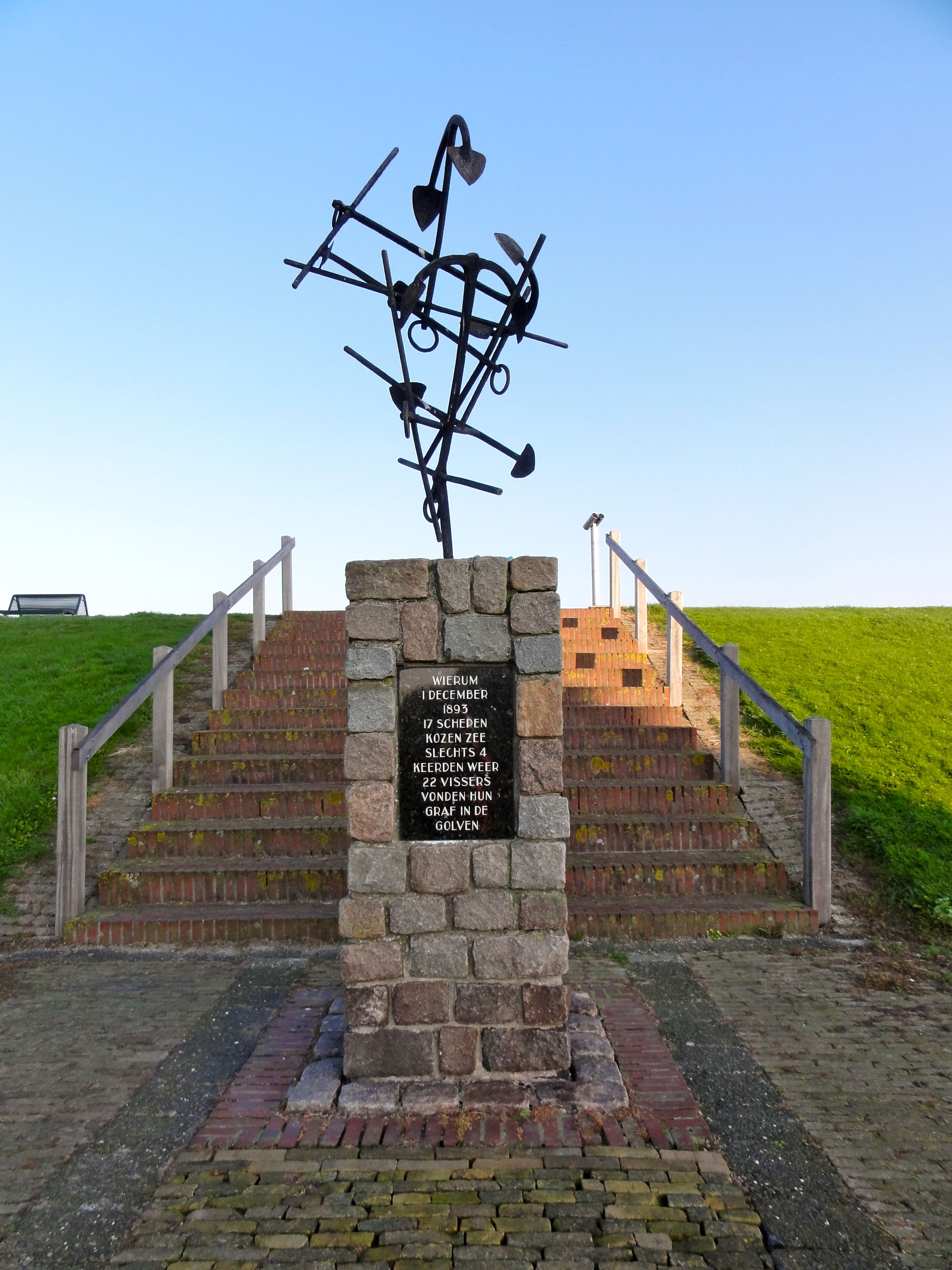
Fisherman's memorial

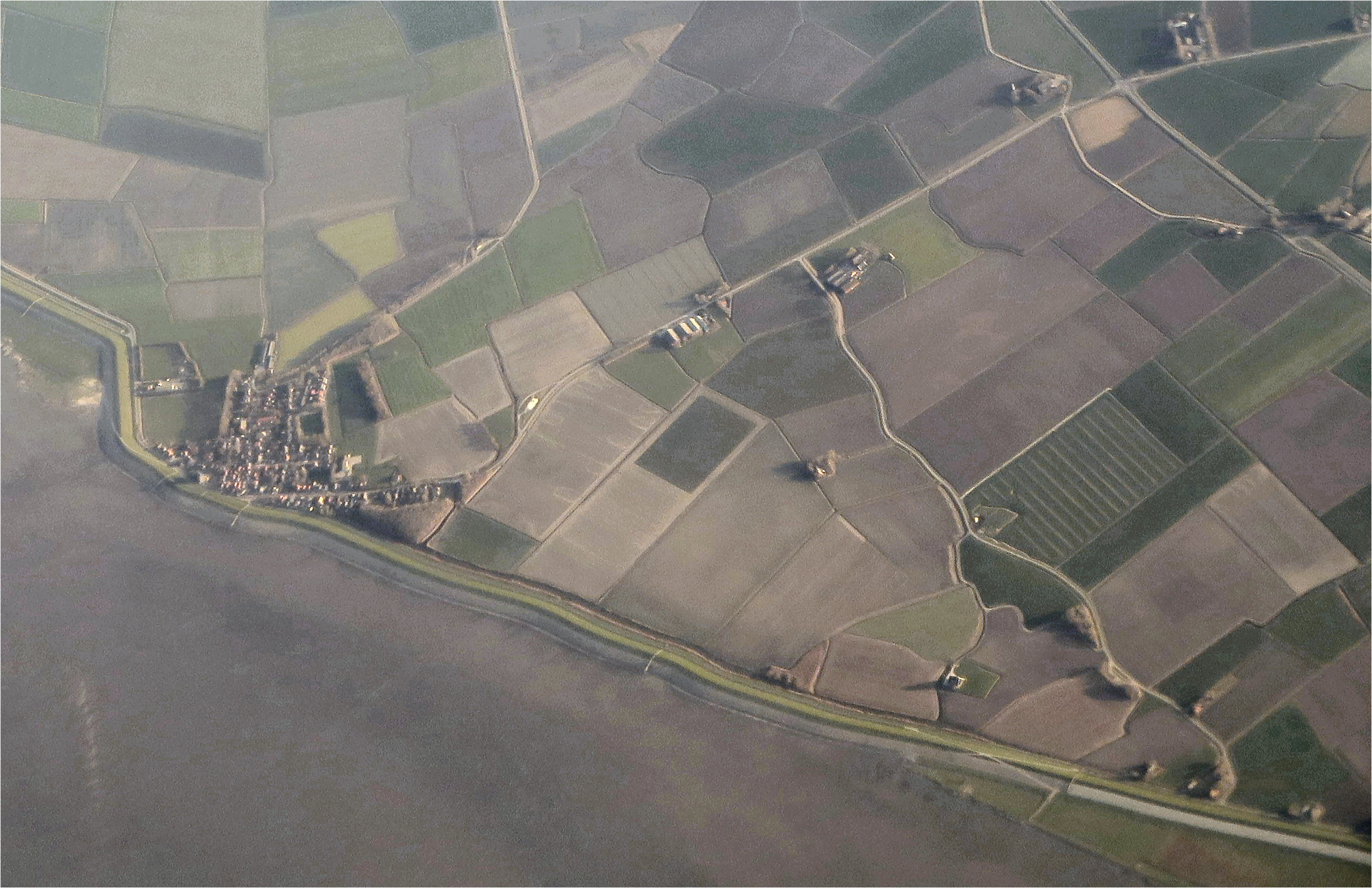
Wierum (view from above)

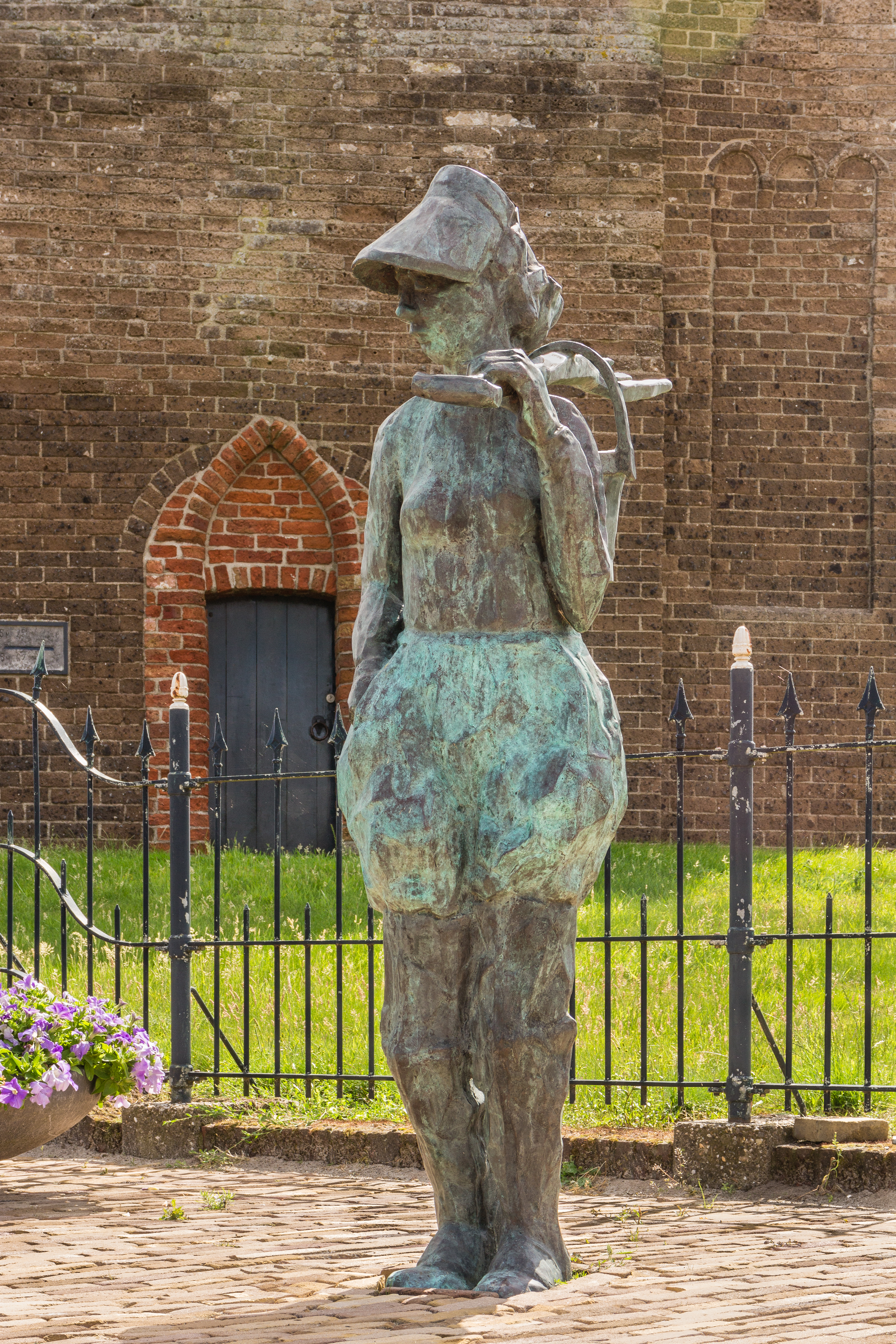
pierensteekster sculptor Hans Jouta.
