= Solomon Cleaver =

Canadian minister (1855–1939)

Solomon Cleaver (1855–1939) was a Winnipeg minister and storyteller best known for his adaptation of Victor Hugo's Les Misérables, published in 1935 as Jean Val Jean. Cleaver was a well-known orator; and actor Raymond Massey is said to have practiced Cleaver's sermons as a child.

== Jean Val Jean ==
According to the publisher's preface, around the turn of the 20th century, Cleaver, a young minister from Winnipeg, read through Les Misérables and often retold it in his own words. His oral adaptation proved so popular that he was persuaded to write it down and publish it. The resulting novel, titled Jean Val Jean, is less than one-tenth the length of the original novel, and uses much simpler language than the original. It remains popular, especially among young readers who do not have the patience or reading skills for Hugo's five-volume original.
