= Hurry Home, Candy =

1953 children's novel by Meindert DeJong

- First edition
- Author: Meindert De Jong
- Illustrator: Maurice Sendak
- Language: English
- Genre: Realistic fiction
- Published: 1953 Harper & Row
- Publication place: United States
- Media type: Print
- Pages: 256
- Awards: Newbery Honor
- ISBN: 978-0060214869

Hurry Home, Candy by Meindert De Jong is a children's novel about a dog. Illustrated by Maurice Sendak, the book was first published in 1953 and was a Newbery Honor recipient in 1954. It regularly appears on public library and school reading lists.

Disney turned it into an episode of The Wonderful World of Color in 1963 renaming it "Little Dog Lost".

== Plot summary ==
Hurry Home, Candy tells the story of a young dog named Candy, chronicling his life through several traumatic and joyful events. Told from the dog's perspective, the reader experiences Candy's separation from his mother and being brought to a cold kitchen floor with the ever-present threat of being hit with a broom. Later in the story, Candy becomes a beloved pet to two small children, only to later become separated from them. His quest to survive and be re-united with his new family constitutes the rest of the narrative.

== Reception ==
Kirkus Reviews said "we are those things with him, quite stricken with his near tragedy and overjoyed when he finds happiness at last."
