= All Thirteen =

2020 children's book by Christina Soontornvat

- Author: Christina Soontornvat
- Language: English
- Publisher: Candlewick Press
- Publication date: October 13, 2020
- Publication place: United States
- Pages: 288
- Awards: Newbery Honor, Sibert Honor
- ISBN: 978-1-5362-0945-7
- OCLC: 1228486011
- Website: soontornvat.com/books/all-thirteen

All Thirteen: The Incredible Cave Rescue of the Thai Boys' Soccer Team is a 2020 nonfiction children's book by American author Christina Soontornvat. It describes the 2018 Tham Luang cave rescue. The book received positive reviews from critics and was awarded a Newbery Honor and a Sibert Honor in 2021.

== Synopsis ==
The book recounts the 2018 Tham Luang cave rescue, in which 12 boys on a soccer team and their coach were rescued after they were trapped in the flooded Tham Luang Nang Non cave. It includes scientific information related to the rescue, including details on caverns and diving, and features photographs and maps of the region.

== Background and publication ==
Soontornvat was visiting family in northern Thailand when the Tham Luang cave story was first reported. According to Soontornvat, upon returning to the United States, she noticed that media coverage was portraying the situation through a predominantly Western lens and decided to tell the story incorporating a Thai perspective. She returned to Thailand two months after the final rescue to interview the volunteers who helped with the rescue efforts, with her father acting as her translator.

The book was published by Candlewick Press on October 13, 2020. The audiobook version was narrated by Quincy Surasmith.

== Reception ==
All Thirteen: The Incredible Rescue of the Thai Boys' Soccer Team garnered positive reviews from critics. It received starred reviews from Booklist, The Horn Book Magazine, Kirkus Reviews, Publishers Weekly, and School Library Journal.

Kirkus Reviews praised the storytelling as "masterful" and "expertly crafted". Publishers Weekly noted that "Soontornvat delivers humanizing coverage of a harrowing event, attempting to decenter Western media’s lens with great success." In a review for Booklist, Ronny Khuri wrote that "Soontornvat selects details and measures her pacing with the practiced hand of a skilled storyteller." V. Lynn Christiansen of School Library Journal compared it to "a heart-pounding adventure story." Jonathan Hunt, writing for The Horn Book Magazine, praised the "lucid prose" and wrote that Soontornvat "keeps a tight focus on the unfolding story".

Accolades for All Thirteen
Year	Accolade	Result	Ref.
2021	Kirkus Prize for Young Readers' Literature	Winner	
2021	Newbery Medal	Honor	
2021	Sibert Medal	Honor	
2021	YALSA Award for Excellence in Nonfiction	Finalist	
