= Hồ Ngọc Xum =

Vietnamese film director (born 1955)

Meritorious Artist Hồ Ngọc Xum 胡玉心
- Born: Hồ Ngọc Xum; 15 February 1955; Phú Tân, An Giang, South Vietnam
- Citizenship: Vietnamese
- Education: Saigon Literary University; Hanoi Academy of Theatre and Cinema
- Occupations: Film director, film producer
- Years active: 1980 - present

Meritorious Artist Hồ Ngọc Xum (Chinese: 胡玉心, born 15 February 1955) is a Vietnamese film director.

== Biography ==
Hồ Ngọc Xum was born on 15 February 1955 at Phú Tân District, An Giang Province, Republic of Vietnam. He has graduated at Saigon Literary University and Hanoi Academy of Theatre and Cinema as a film director.

== Career ==
- Ngọn lửa Krông Jung (1980)
- Ngọn cỏ gió đùa (phim điện ảnh 1989)
- Mảnh tinh nghiệt ngã (1990)
- Lệnh truy nã (1991)
- Tình yêu vực tham (1992)
- Võ sĩ bất đắc dĩ (1992)
- Mênh mông tình buồn (1992)
- Cô gái mộng mơ (1993)
- Yêu nàng hoa hậu (1994)
- Tha lỗi cho anh (Vị đắng tình yêu 3)
- Trăng không mùa (1997)
- Cô gái Trà peng (1998)
- Con nhà nghèo (1998)
- Lửa vòng cung (2000)
- Sương gió biên thùy (2001)
- Nợ đời (2002)
- Không thể siết cò (2003)
- Nợ đời (2004)
- Đời thương hồ
- Hai mảnh đời (2005)
- Cay đắng mùi đời (2006)
- Giá mua một thượng đế (2007)
- Khí phách anh hùng (2008)
- Tại tôi (2009)
- Cuộc phiêu lưu của Hai Lúa (2009)
- Bức họa tình yêu (2009)
- Tân Phong nữ sĩ (2009)
- Love Case (Tình án 2009)
- Khóc thầm (2010)
- Tình Kacao
- Lòng dạ đàn bà (2011)
- Chuyện làng Bè (2012)
- Giông bão
- Ngọn cỏ gió đùa (2013)
- Cuộc phiêu lưu của Hai Lúa|Cuộc phiêu lưu của Hai Lúa (phần 2) (2015)
- Hai khối tình (2016)
- Oan trái nghĩa tình (2016)
- Trọn nghĩa thủy chung (2016)
- Duyên định kim tiền (2017)
- Tơ hồng vương vấn (2017)
- Oan trái nghĩa tình (2019)
- Con ông Hai Lúa (2019-2020)
- Sui gia đại chiến (2021)
- Một đám cưới ba nàng dâu (2021)
- Lỗi đạo cang thường (2022)
- Gieo nhân (2023)
- Vầng trăng thơ ấu (2024)
- Hậu Giang thương nhớ (2025)

== Honors ==
- Golden Kite for the best drama.
- Golden Kite for the best movie.
