= Rajani LaRocca =

Indian-American writer of children's literature

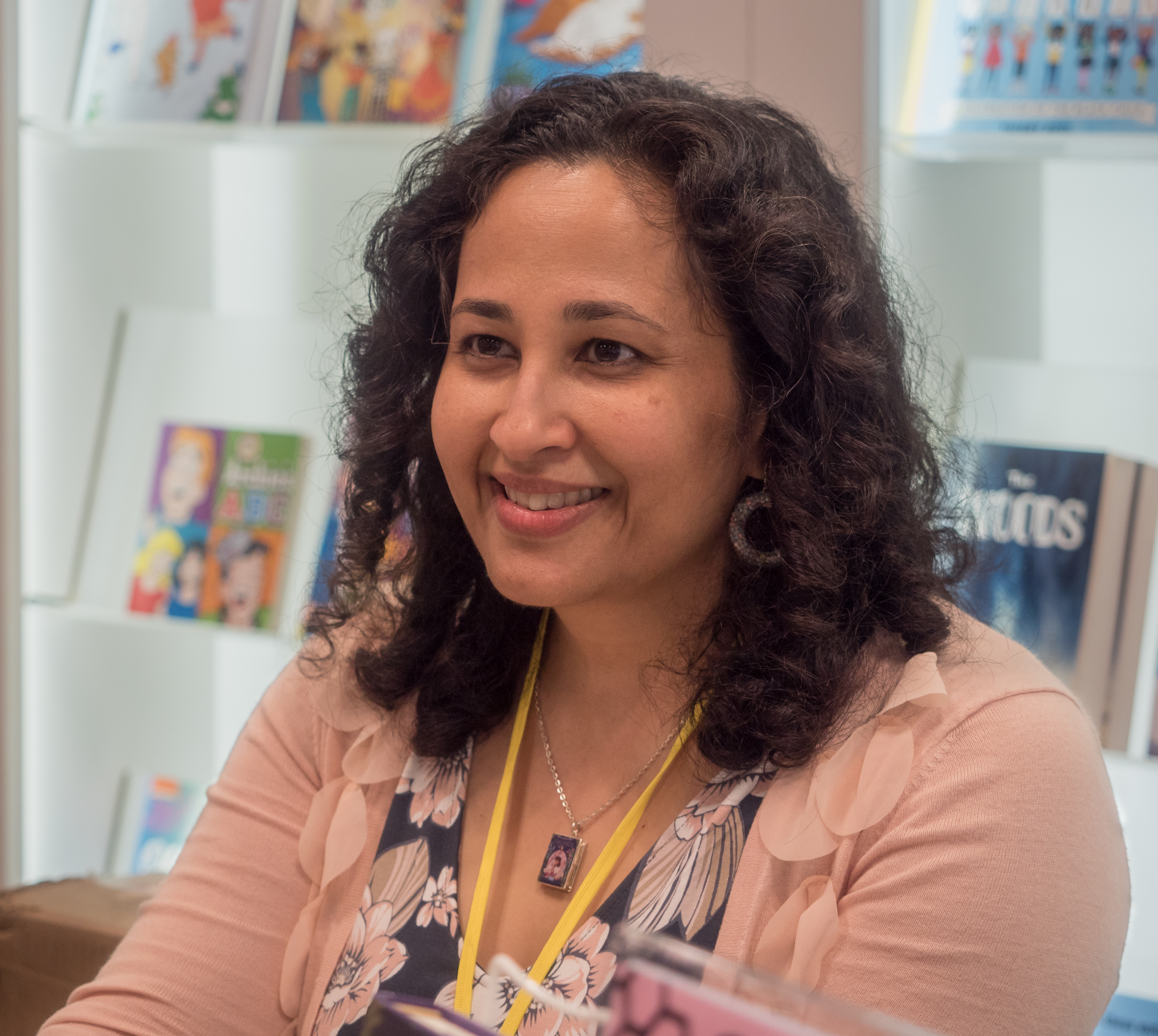
- LaRocca at BookExpo in New York City, May 2019
- Born: Bangalore, Karnataka, India
- Citizenship: USA
- Education: Harvard College; Harvard Medical School
- Occupations: Writer, physician
- Writing career
- Language: English
- Notable works: Red, White, and Whole (2021); Sona and the Golden Beasts (2024)
- Website: rajanilarocca.com

Rajani LaRocca is an Indian-American author of children's literature and a primary-care physician. She writes middle grade fiction relating to Indian-American identity and medicine. She won a 2022 Newbery Honor for her novel Red, White and Whole.

LaRocca enjoyed creative writing in high school and college but stopped when she began attending medical school. She began writing again in 2011. She signed with TriadaUS Literary Agency in 2017.

LaRocca is of Tamil descent. She was born in Bangalore but grew up in Louisville, Kentucky, where she attended Louisville Collegiate School. She moved to Boston for college. She is a graduate of Harvard College and Harvard Medical School.

As of 2022, she lived in Concord, Massachusetts, with her family.

Four of LaRocca's books are Junior Library Guild selections: Much Ado about Baseball (2021), Red, White, and Whole (2021), Summer Is for Cousins (2023), and Sona and the Golden Beasts (2024).

== Publications ==
=== Picture books ===
- Seven Golden Rings: A Tale of Music and Math. Illustrated by Archana Sreenivasan. Lee & Low Books Incorporated. 2020. ISBN 978-1-885008-97-8.
- Bracelets for Bina's Brothers. Illustrated by Chaaya Prabhat. Charlesbridge Publishing. 2021. ISBN 978-1-62354-129-3.
- My Little Golden Book About Kamala Harris. Illustrated by Ashley Evans. Random House Children's Books. 2021. ISBN 978-0-593-43022-4.
- The Secret Code Inside You: All About Your DNA. Illustrated by Steven Salerno. little bee books. 2021. ISBN 978-1-4998-1075-2.
- Summer is for Cousins. Illustrated by Abhi Alwar. Abrams. 2021. ISBN 978-1-4197-5733-4.
- Where Three Oceans Meet. Illustrated by Archana Sreenivasan. Abrams. 2021. ISBN 978-1-64700-500-9.
- I'll Go and Come Back. Illustrated by Sara Palacios. Candlewick Press. 2022. ISBN 978-1-5362-0717-0.
- Chicken Soup for the Soul BABIES: Now! (Barks Dog). Illustrated by Greg Paprocki. Charlesbridge Publishing. 2022. ISBN 978-1-63289-339-0.
- Chicken Soup For the Soul KIDS: Lucas's Tricky Day: Looking on the Bright Side. Illustrated by India Valle. Charlesbridge. 2022. ISBN 978-1-62354-283-2.
- A Vaccine is Like a Memory. Illustrated by Kathleen Marcotte. Little Bee Books. 2023. ISBN 978-1-4998-1326-5.
- Your One and Only Heart. Illustrated by Lauren Paige Conrad. Dial Books. 2023. ISBN 978-0-593-32633-6.
- Masala Chai, Fast and Slow. Illustrated by Neha Rawat. Candlewick Press. 2023. ISBN 978-1-5362-1940-1.
- Mauntie and Me. Illustrated by Nadia Alam. Candlewick Press. 2024. ISBN 978-1-536-22941-7.
- Some of Us: A Story of Citizenship and the United States. Illustrated by Huy Voun Lee. Christy Ottaviano. 2025. ISBN 978-0-316-57175-3.

=== Middle grade novels ===
- Midsummer's Mayhem. Illustrated by Rachel Suggs. Simon and Schuster. 2019. ISBN 978-1-4998-0889-6.
- Red, White, and Whole. HarperCollins. 2021. ISBN 978-0-06-304744-0.
- Much Ado About Baseball. Simon and Schuster. 2021. ISBN 978-1-4998-1223-7.
- The Secret of the Dragon Gems. With Chris Baron. Little Bee. 2023. ISBN 978-1-4998-1463-7.
- Mirror to Mirror. Quill Tree Books. 2023. ISBN 978-0-063-04747-1.
- Sona and the Golden Beasts. Quill Tree Books. 2024. ISBN 978-0-06329-540-7.

=== Young adult novels ===
- Such Great Heights. Quill Tree Books. 2026. ISBN 9780063296879.
