= Sona and the Golden Beasts =

2024 middle-grade novel by Rajani LaRocca

- Author: Rajani LaRocca
- Language: English
- Genre: Middle grade literature; Fantasy literature
- Publisher: Quill Tree Books
- Publication date: March 5, 2024
- Pages: 400
- ISBN: 978-0-06329-540-7

Sona and the Golden Beasts is a 2024 middle grade fantasy novel by Indian-American author Rajani LaRocca. The novel follows 13-year-old Sona Kalpani as she learns the truth about herself and her world.

== Plot ==
Inspired by South Asian culture, Sona and the Golden Beasts centers 13-year-old Sona Kalpani, a member of the ruling Malech class who conquered the country of Devia centuries ago. Her family owns a farm where Devans farm rare gems to be sold around the world. Despite music being outlawed to subdue the magical Devan people, Sona enjoys singing and listening to the world around her. This leads to her finding a pup who has recently been orphaned by a hunter, who wants to finish the job. After learning family secrets, she runs off with the pup, seeking the support of the elderly Ayah. When Ayah becomes ill, Sona seeks a cure with Ayah's grandson, Raag.

== Themes ==
Sona and the Golden Beasts discusses racism and colonialism, as well as the more positive themes of friendship and forgiveness.

== Reception ==
Sona and the Golden Beasts was well received by critics, including starred reviews from Booklist, Kirkus Reviews, and School Library Journal.

Booklist included the novel on their lists of the "Top 10 SF/Fantasy Books for Youth" for 2024, as well as their "Top 10 Fantastical Middle-Grade Novels" for 2025. Also in 2025, the Association for Library Service to Children named Sona and the Golden Beasts one of the years Notable Children's Books.

Sona and the Golden Beasts is also a Junior Library Guild book.

According to Booklist's Emily Graham, the "story is rich in historical detail and mythical lore, offering a rip-roaring adventure story while also gently introducing readers to matters of entrenched racism and the costs of colonialism".
