= May Holt =

English actress, manager and playwright

- Born: Elizabeth May Holt; 14 November 1849; Bury St Edmunds, Suffolk, England
- Occupations: actress and playwright
- Years active: 1857–1910
- Spouse: Reginald Fairbairn
- Children: Ada Fairbairn

May Holt born Elizabeth May Holt was an English actress, manager and playwright who had a successful career on the stage in England and Australia.”She was claimed with great affection by both the Australian and British press and identified as a peer by her contemporaries and colleagues in both Britain and Australia.”

== Early life and acting career ==
She was born on 14 November 1849 in Bury St Edmunds, Suffolk the second daughter of the actor-manager, Clarance Holt and she acted in his company from a very early age. In 1857, at the age of 8, she appeared, with the rest of the family, in the melodrama, The Children of the Castle by Edward Fitzball. May toured with the family throughout Great Britain, Australia and New Zealand and was already receiving top billing in her late teens – playing Ophelia at the age of 18 and starring as Eponine in her father’s adaptation of Victor Hugo's Les Misérables entitled The Barricade a year later. She was noted for her singing and dancing in many newspaper reviews and appeared in the Music Halls as well as the theatre. As an example of this versatility: in 1867 she appeared at the Theatre Royal, Manchester and, after the performance of Hamlet, starred in the farce Easy Shaving and sang two popular ballads.

== Career as a playwright ==
In 1880 she married Reginald Fairbairn; she was 30 and he 24. He was the youngest son of Sir Thomas Fairbairn, 2nd Baronet of Ardwick and the grandson of the famous engineer, Sir William Fairbairn. After her marriage she continued to appear on the stage but also became an accomplished playwright. Her plays were produced, with considerable success, in both England and Australia.

== Playlist ==
Her plays include:-

- Jabez North (1881)
- Sweetheart Goodbye (1881)
- Waiting Consent (1881)
- Men and Women, an entirely new and original drama in seven tableaux (1882)
- False Pride (1883)
- High Art, a new farce (1883)
