= Christina Soontornvat =

American author and educator

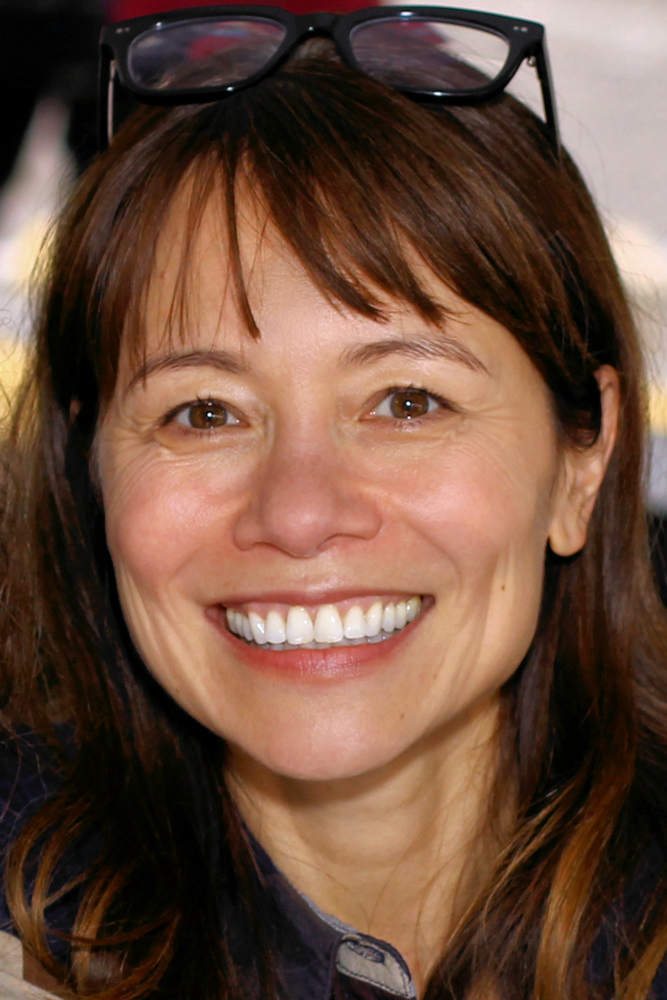
- Soontornvat at the 2023 Texas Book Festival
- Born: 1980 (age 45–46)
- Education: Trinity University (BS); University of Texas at Austin (MS)
- Occupation: Author
- Writing career
- Period: 2016–present
- Genres: Children's and young adult fiction
- Website: soontornvat.com

Christina Soontornvat (Thai: คริสติน่า สุนทรวัฒน์; born 1980) is an American author, educator, and mechanical engineer. She won two Newbery Honors in 2021 for the children's books A Wish in the Dark and All Thirteen: The Incredible Cave Rescue of the Thai Boys' Soccer Team (fiction and nonfiction, respectively), and another Newbery Honor in 2023 for the middle grade novel "The Last Mapmaker".

== Early life and education ==
Soontornvat was born in 1980, a daughter of Amnaj Soontornvat, a businessowner from Thailand and granddaughter of Thai broadcasting executive Saengchai Sunthornwat. She attended Weatherford High School in Weatherford, Texas, graduating in 1998. She earned a Bachelor of Science degree in mechanical engineering from Trinity University in 2002, and a Master of Science degree in science education from the University of Texas at Austin in 2007.

== Career ==
Prior to her literary career, Soontornvat worked at a science museum.

In 2020, Soontornvat wrote the children's books A Wish in the Dark and All Thirteen: The Incredible Cave Rescue of the Thai Boys' Soccer Team. In an interview, she stated that All Thirteen, which describes the 2018 Tham Luang cave rescue, was told "from the Thai perspective as much as possible, and to let people know about Thailand". Both books were awarded a Newbery Honor in 2021, making Soontornvat the third author to receive two Newbery awards in the same year (after Meindert DeJong in 1954 and E. L. Konigsburg in 1968). She is the first author to win two Newbery awards in the same year for both fiction (A Wish in the Dark) and nonfiction (All Thirteen).

Soontornvat, along with fellow writers Ellen Oh and Melanie Conklin, organized the Everywhere Book Fest, which took place May 1–2, 2020. It was created in response to book festival cancellations due to the COVID-19 pandemic, including the Tucson Festival of Books, where Soontornvat and Oh had been scheduled to speak on a panel. The event included live and pre-recorded segments featuring authors of children's and young adult books, and was attended by over 43,000 online viewers.

== Personal life ==
Soontornvat lives in Austin, Texas with her husband. They have five children.

== Publications ==
=== Changelings series ===
1. The Changelings (September 6, 2016)
2. In a Dark Land: A Changelings Story (October 1, 2017)

=== Diary of an Ice Princess series ===
1. Snow Place Like Home (June 25, 2019)
2. Frost Friends Forever (June 25, 2019)
3. On Thin Ice (October 1, 2019)
4. The Big Freeze (March 3, 2020)
5. Slush Puppy Love (June 2, 2020)
6. Icing on the Snowflake (September 15, 2020)

=== Other books ===
- The Blunders: A Counting Catastrophe! (February 11, 2020)
- A Wish in the Dark (March 24, 2020)
- Simon at the Art Museum (June 9, 2020)
- All Thirteen: The Incredible Cave Rescue of the Thai Boys' Soccer Team (October 13, 2020)
- The Ramble Shamble Children (March 9, 2021)
- The Last Mapmaker (April 12, 2022)
- The Tryout
